= Flixton =

Flixton may refer to the following places in England:

- Flixton, Greater Manchester, part of the Metropolitan Borough of Trafford
  - Flixton F.C.
  - Flixton railway station
  - Flixton (ward)
  - Flixton Girls' School
  - Flixton Junior School
- Flixton, North Yorkshire, a village near Scarborough
- Flixton, Lothingland, a village near Lowestoft, in Suffolk
- Flixton, The Saints, a village south of Bungay, in Suffolk
  - RAF Flixton
