= List of schools in Trafford =

This is a list of schools in the Metropolitan Borough of Trafford in the English county of Greater Manchester.

== State-funded schools ==
In the state-funded sector Trafford maintains a selective education system, with grammar schools assessed by the 11-plus exam. Absences from Trafford secondary schools in 2006–07, authorised and unauthorised, were 5.6% and 0.8% respectively, both lower than the national average (6.4% and 1.4%). From the 2011 GCSE results, the Trafford Local Education Authority was ranked 5th in the country – and first in Greater Manchester – based on the percentage of pupils attaining at least 5 A*–C grades at GCSE including maths and English (69.8% compared with the national average of 58.2%).

From the 2007 GCSE results and A-level results, Altrincham Grammar School for Girls was the most successful secondary school in Trafford, with 100% of pupils gaining five or more GCSEs at A*–C grade including maths and English. At A-level, Altrincham Grammar School for Girls was the 39th most successful school in the country.

=== Primary schools ===
- Acre Hall Primary School, Flixton
- All Saints' RC Primary School, Sale
- Altrincham CE Primary School, Altrincham
- Barton Clough Primary School, Stretford
- Bollin Primary School, Bowdon
- Bowdon CE Primary School, Bowdon
- Broadheath Primary School, Broadheath
- Brooklands Primary School, Sale
- Broomwood Primary School, Timperley
- Cloverlea Primary School, Timperley
- Davyhulme Primary School, Davyhulme
- Elmridge Primary School, Hale Barns
- English Martyrs RC Primary School, Urmston
- Firs Primary School, Sale
- Flixton Primary School, Flixton
- Forest Gate Academy, Partington
- Gorse Hill Primary School, Stretford
- Heyes Lane Primary School, Timperley
- Highfield Primary School, Urmston
- Holy Family RC Primary School, Sale
- Kings Road Primary School, Firswood
- Kingsway Primary School, Davyhulme
- Lime Tree Primary Academy, Sale
- Moorlands Junior School, Sale
- Moss Park Primary School, Stretford
- Navigation Primary School, Altrincham
- Old Trafford Community Academy, Old Trafford
- Oldfield Brow Primary School, Altrincham
- Our Lady of Lourdes RC Primary School, Partington
- Our Lady of the Rosary RC Primary School, Davyhulme
- Park Road Academy Primary School, Timperley
- Park Road Sale Primary School, Sale
- Partington Central Academy, Partington
- St Alphonsus' RC Primary School, Old Trafford
- St Anne's CE Primary, Sale
- St Ann's RC Primary, Stretford
- St Hilda's CE Primary School, Firswood
- St Hugh of Lincoln RC Primary School, Stretford
- St Hugh's RC Primary School, Timperley
- St Joseph's RC Primary School, Sale
- St Margaret Ward RC Primary School, Sale
- St Mary's CE Primary School, Davyhulme
- St Mary's CE Primary School, Sale
- St Matthew's CE Primary School, Stretford
- St Michael's CE Primary School, Flixton
- St Monica's RC Primary School, Flixton
- St Teresa's RC Primary School, Firswood
- St Vincent's RC Primary School, Altrincham
- Seymour Park Community Primary School, Old Trafford
- Springfield Primary School, Sale
- Stamford Park Primary School, Hale
- Templemoor Infant and Nursery School, Sale
- Tyntesfield Primary School, Sale
- Urmston Primary School, Urmston
- Victoria Park Infant School, Stretford
- Victoria Park Junior School, Stretford
- Well Green Primary School, Hale
- Wellfield Infant and Nursery School, Sale
- Wellfield Junior School, Sale
- Willows Primary School, Timperley
- Woodheys Primary School, Sale
- Woodhouse Primary School, Davyhulme
- Worthington Primary School, Sale

=== Non-selective secondary schools ===
- Altrincham College, Timperley
- Ashton-on-Mersey School, Sale
- Blessed Thomas Holford Catholic College, Altrincham
- Broadoak School, Partington
- Flixton Girls' School, Flixton
- Lostock High School, Stretford
- North Cestrian School, Altrincham
- St Antony's Roman Catholic School, Urmston
- Sale High School, Sale
- Stretford High School, Stretford
- Wellacre Academy, Flixton
- Wellington School, Timperley

=== Grammar schools ===
- Altrincham Grammar School for Boys, Bowdon
- Altrincham Grammar School for Girls, Bowdon
- Loreto Grammar School, Altrincham
- St Ambrose College, Hale Barns
- Sale Grammar School, Sale
- Stretford Grammar School, Stretford
- Urmston Grammar Academy, Urmston

=== Special and alternative schools ===
- Brentwood School, Sale
- Delamere School, Flixton
- Egerton High School, Davyhulme
- Longford Park School, Stretford
- Manor Academy, Sale
- The Orchards, Stretford
- Pictor Academy, Timperley
- Trafford Alternative Education Provision, Timperley

=== Further education ===
- Trafford College, Timperley

== Independent schools ==
=== Primary and preparatory schools ===
- Abbotsford Preparatory School, Urmston
- Altrincham Preparatory School, Bowdon
- Bowdon Preparatory School for Girls, Altrincham
- Forest Park Preparatory School, Ashton upon Mersey
- Forest School, Timperley
- Hale Preparatory School, Hale
- St Ambrose Prep School, Hale Barns

=== Senior and all-through schools ===
- Afifah School, Old Trafford

=== Special and alternative schools ===
- Changing Lives, Carrington
- Fairfield House School, Partington
- St John Vianney School, Firswood
