= Billy Boardman =

English footballer

Personal information
- Full name: William Boardman
- Date of birth: 14 October 1895
- Place of birth: Urmston, England
- Date of death: 8 January 1951 (aged 55)
- Place of death: Manchester, England
- Height: 5 ft 10 in (1.78 m)
- Position: Forward

Senior career*
Years	Team	Apps	(Gls)
−1920	Eccles Borough		
1920–1922	Leeds United	4	(0)
1922–1927	Doncaster Rovers	182	(57)
1927–1928	Crewe Alexandra	13	(2)
1928	Chester		
- * Club domestic league appearances and goals

William Boardman (14 October 1895−1968) was an English footballer who played as a forward in the Football League for Leeds United, Doncaster Rovers and Crewe Alexandra.

== Playing career ==
He is first known to have played for Eccles Borough from where he moved to Leeds United after he represented the Manchester League against the Irish League. His debut for Leeds was on 6 November 1920 against Stoke City and that season he went onto make 3 more appearances.

In January 1922 he moved to Doncaster Rovers in the Midland League, and then played with them in the Third Division North when they were elected in 1923. He enjoyed success at Doncaster, scoring 37 times in 60 Midland League appearances in his first two seasons, and overall 61 times in 196 games.

He moved to Crewe for one season in 1927−28, and then to non-league Chester.
