= Frances Lennon =

British artist (1912–2015)

Frances Lennon MBE
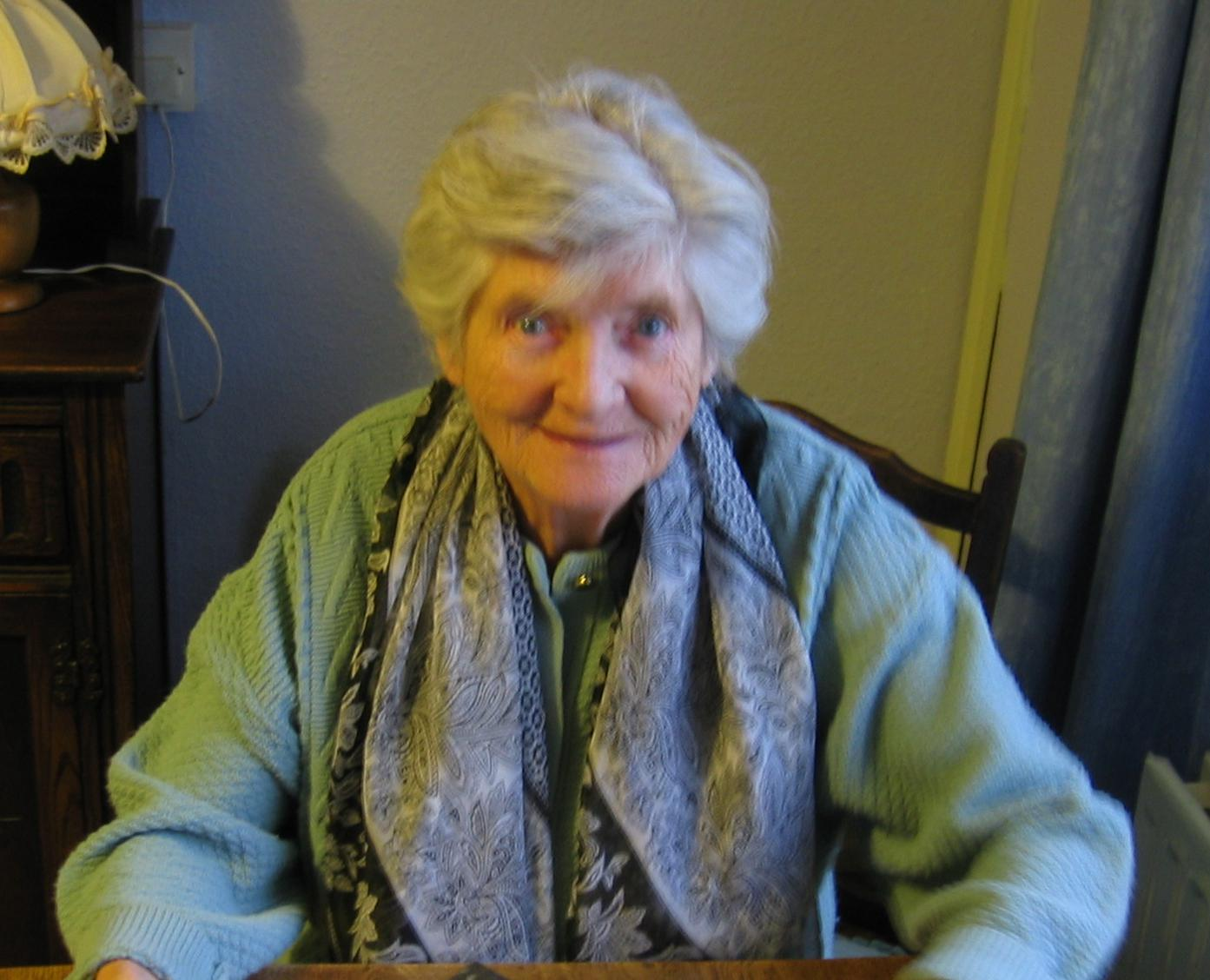
- Lennon in 2006
- Born: Frances Mooney; 12 September 1912; Stretford, Lancashire, England
- Died: 24 January 2015 (aged 102); Manchester, England
- Known for: Painting
- Awards: Member of the Most Excellent Order of the British Empire; Honorary degrees from University of Salford and Manchester Metropolitan University

Frances Lennon, MBE (12 September 1912 – 24 January 2015) was a British artist from Greater Manchester, probably best known for being the Official Artist of the 2002 Commonwealth Games. Many comparisons have been made between Lennon's work and that of fellow Stretfordian L. S. Lowry; her paintings have been described as "Lowry-esque, but with more humour". Well-known collectors of her work include former Member of Parliament Winston Churchill.

== Early life ==
Lennon was born on Haddon Street, in the Gorse Hill district of Stretford. She was the second child of Edward and Margaret Mooney, and grew up with her elder sister Margaret and her younger brother Wilfrid. Frances was baptised into the Roman Catholic Church at St Ann's, Stretford and educated at the parish school between 1915 and 1923. She then went on to study at the Adelphi House Convent School in Salford, where the sisters of the Faithful Companions of Jesus discovered her talent for art. She also began drawing cartoons for Punch Magazine.

In 1928 Mooney began work as a draughtsman's assistant at the Metropolitan-Vickers factory in Trafford Park. She married fireman William Lennon on 19 February 1938 at St Ann’s, Stretford and the couple moved to the Bradford Fire Station, in east Manchester. They moved back to Stretford in 1943, after her husband's injuries during the Manchester Blitz forced her to return to work to support the family. She took a job with the Ministry of Defence as a draughtsman, drawing plans for new war planes. They remained in Stretford until the late 1970s, when they retired to Flixton, Greater Manchester.

== Years as an artist ==
Lennon began painting full-time after the death of her husband in 1982. She released several books, including best-selling collections entitled A Trafford Childhood (1986) and A Manchester Childhood (2001). In 2002 she was commissioned as the official artist for the Commonwealth Games and produced a special book of paintings relating to games and sports.

== Honours ==
In 2003 Lennon was awarded an MBE by Prince Charles for her contribution to arts and charity, which included extensive work for the St Francis House Hospice in Didsbury. She was presented with two honorary degrees in 2004, the first from Salford University on 14 July and the second from Manchester Metropolitan University on 16 July. She died in Longsight, Manchester at the Little Sisters of the Poor nursing home on 24 January 2015, aged 102.
