= St Michael's Church, Flixton =

- Parish Church of St Michael, Flixton
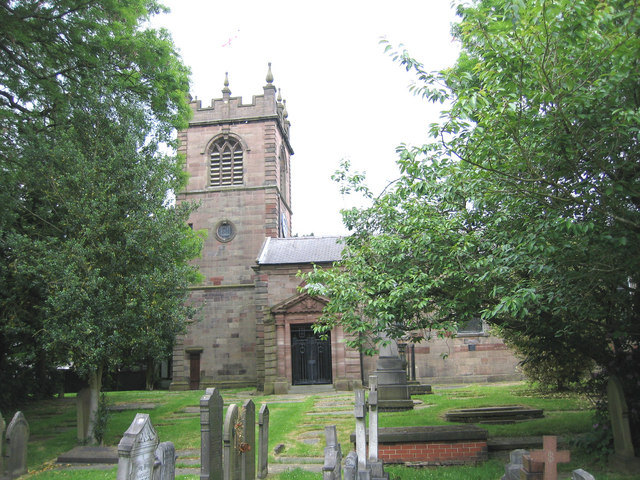
- The church viewed from the south in June 2009
- St Michael's Church, Flixton
- 53°26′31″N 2°22′55″W
- OS grid reference: SJ7473093960
- Location: 348 Church Road, Flixton, Trafford, Greater Manchester
- Country: England
- Denomination: Church of England
- Previous denomination: Catholic Church
- Website: stmichaelsflixton.org

History
- Status: Parish Church
- Founded: Pre-1066
- Dedication: Michael (archangel)

Architecture
- Functional status: Active
- Architectural type: Church
- Style: Georgian architecture and Gothic Revival

Administration
- Province: York
- Diocese: Manchester
- Parish: St Michael, Flixton

Clergy
- Vicar: Revd Huw Thomas

Listed Building – Grade II*
- Official name: Church of St Michael
- Designated: 28 June 1966
- Reference no.: 1067876

St Michael's Church, Flixton, is a Grade II* listed Church of England parish church situated in Flixton, Greater Manchester, within the Diocese of Manchester. Historically, the parish also encompassed Urmston. The church is dedicated to Michael the Archangel. Potentially a site of worship since before the Norman Conquest of 1066, the church is documented to have been established by at least 1198. From the 13th to the 19th centuries, it was under the jurisdiction of the Diocese of Lichfield.

The current structure, incorporating fragments of 12th-century stonework, predominantly dates from the 15th century, with subsequent rebuilds and restorations. The churchyard houses gravestones dating back to 1669. Located on high ground near the River Mersey, the church offers extensive views over Carrington Moss. The church is located in the Flixton Conservation Area.

== History ==
Little is known of the origins of when this site was first used for worship, it is presumed that people have been worshipping here since before the Norman invasion of 1066, however there is scant structural evidence of this. Some believe the church to be actually founded in 1198.

The church is situated in the parish of Flixton. Medieval Flixton was one of several parishes which existed in the Hundred of Salford. The parish encompassed the manors of Urmston and Flixton; the latter is first mentioned between 1189 and 1181 and was granted by the Mascy family of Dunham. The name "Flixton" is believed by some to be linked to a Viking named Flikke or Flikkr, who is thought to have introduced Christianity by building a church at the site. However, there are differing exact theories to this.

The manor of Flixton's boundaries are unclear, although they were perhaps formed by a mixture of natural and man-made features including Carr Ditch, which divided Flixton and Urmston. St Michael's Church is also first recorded at about the same time. In keeping with a pattern found in northern and eastern Cheshire and south-eastern Lancashire, the parish comprised isolated farmsteads and a medieval manor house, rather than a village centre. As the population of Flixton grew throughout the 19th and 20th century, a new church St. John's was constructed in the mid 20th century to serve as a "mission-church".

Flixton is in the Church of England Diocese of Manchester and the Roman Catholic Diocese of Salford. Historically church life has centred around the Grade II* listed 12th-century church, built on raised land close to the centre of Flixton village. For about 500 years the church was attached to Lichfield Cathedral by a prebend.

== Church building ==
The church is in a predominantly Georgian in its architectural-contextual style. In 1888 the tower which now stands was completely rebuilt on the foundations of a previous 18th century one.

=== Interior ===
According to a 1911 local history book by Farrer and Brownbill, the current structure has retained so few original elements that its historical development is largely obscure. They note that only two 12th-century stone fragments with lozenge patterns are visible in the east wall, while the chancel, largely from the 15th century, has been extensively rebuilt. The surviving old work, they found, was limited to parts of the reconstructed walling, which may incorporate some original masonry.

St Michael's church tower is home to a ring of eight bells. The bells at St Michael's are still rung every week for church services and the bell ringers practise every Tuesday night. In 1808 the four bells were recast and four more added. They were recast again in 1938. The tenor bells weighs 13 long cwt 3 qr 1 lb (1,541 lb or 699 kg) and is tuned to F (706.0 Hz). The bells are still rung today. And there has been a robed choir in existence at St Michael's since the 1870s.

== Churchyard ==
The earliest stone dates from 1669, though there are records of burials before that. There are simple verses on many of the flat-stones, e.g. the Fiddler's grave near the vestry door. The verse on the Blacksmith's grave, William Oldfield, east of the vestry, is attributed to the Lancashire poet Tim Bobbin, who was baptised in this church.

== People ==
=== Vicar ===
The vicar incumbent of the parish is The Reverend Huw Thomas, who replaced the previous vicar, the Reverend Dr. Victoria Johnson (the current Residentiary Canon of Ely Cathedral) in 2016. There has been ministers and rectors recorded at the church since the 12th century.

=== Parish groups ===
The parish runs numerous groups for the community to participate in such as bell ringing, a choir, a gardening team and a mother's union.

=== Restoration and Development Trust ===
A restoration and development trust at the church describes itself as aiming to maintain and develop the church's structure and adjacent Church Croft, while also supporting the spiritual growth of the parish.

== Gallery ==
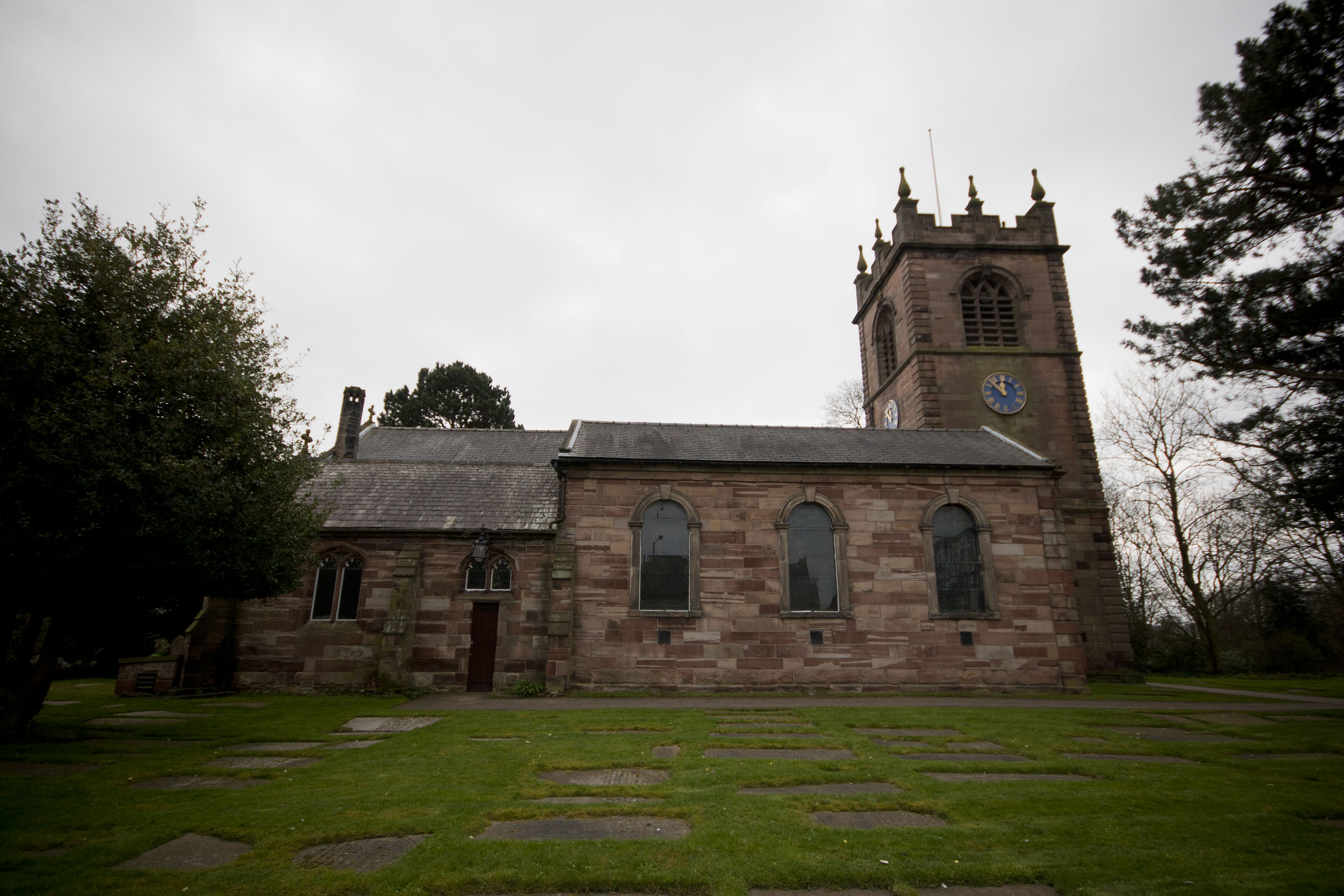
The view of the church from the side.

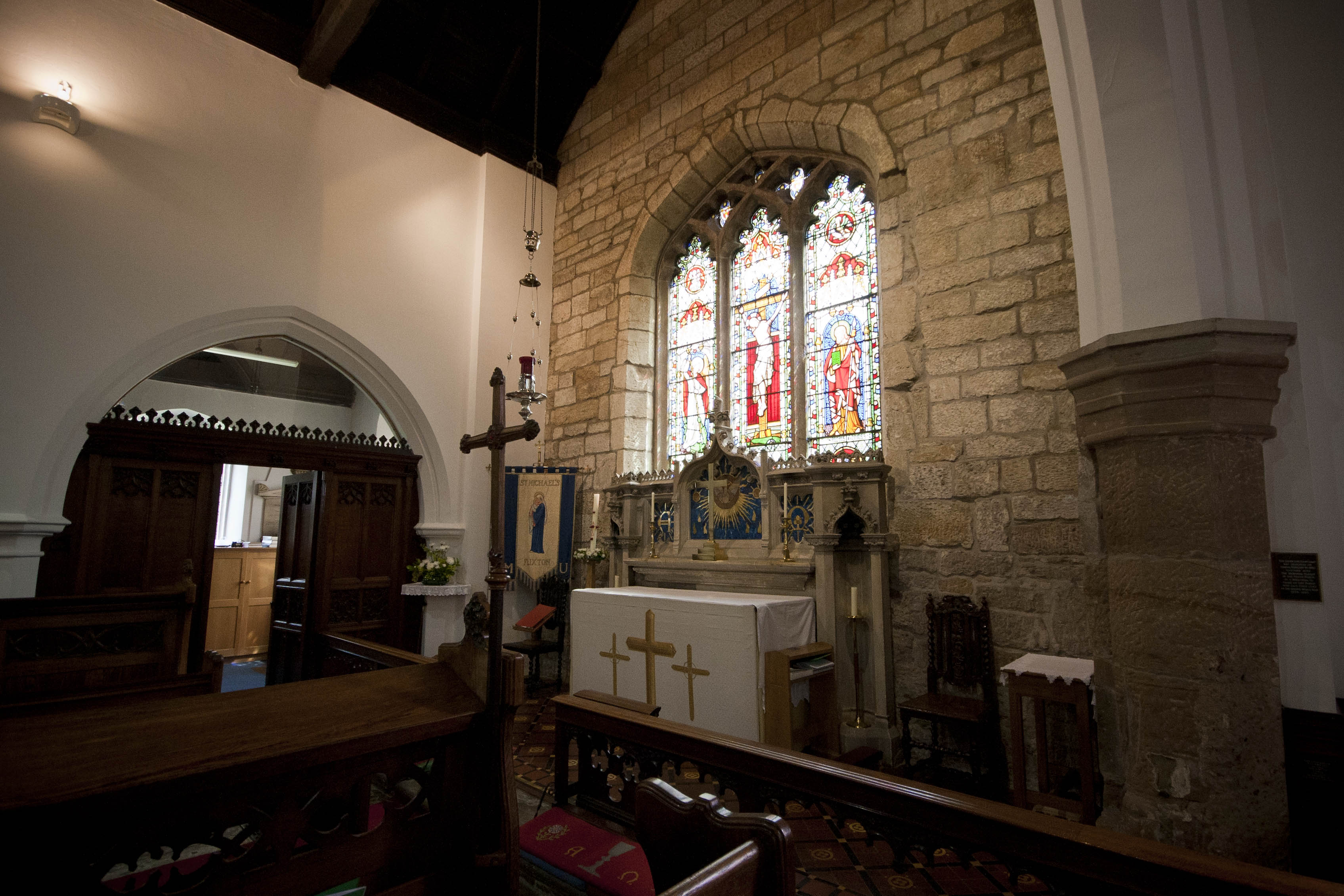
The sanctuary end with altar and antependium.

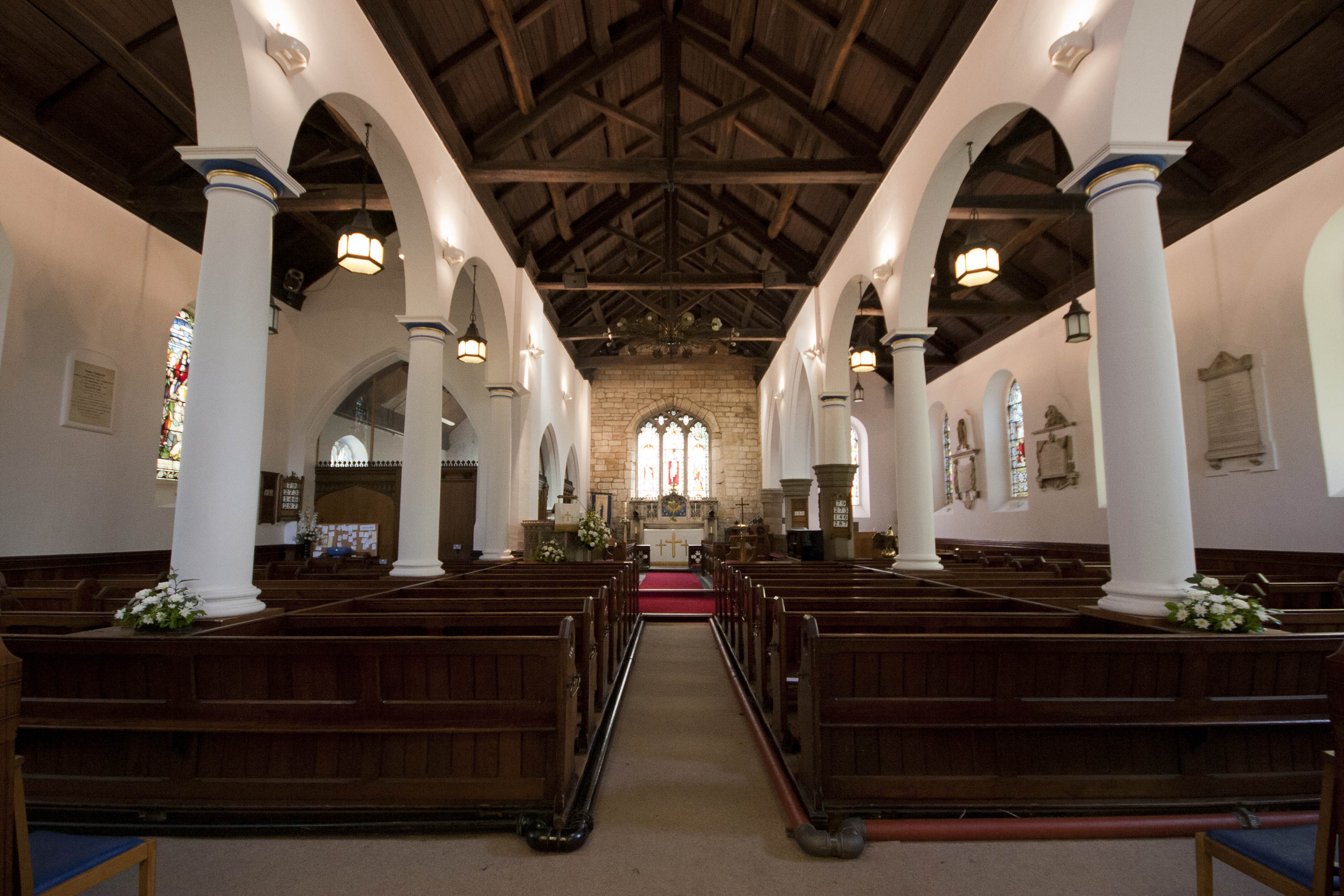
The central nave of the church looking down to the sanctuary end.

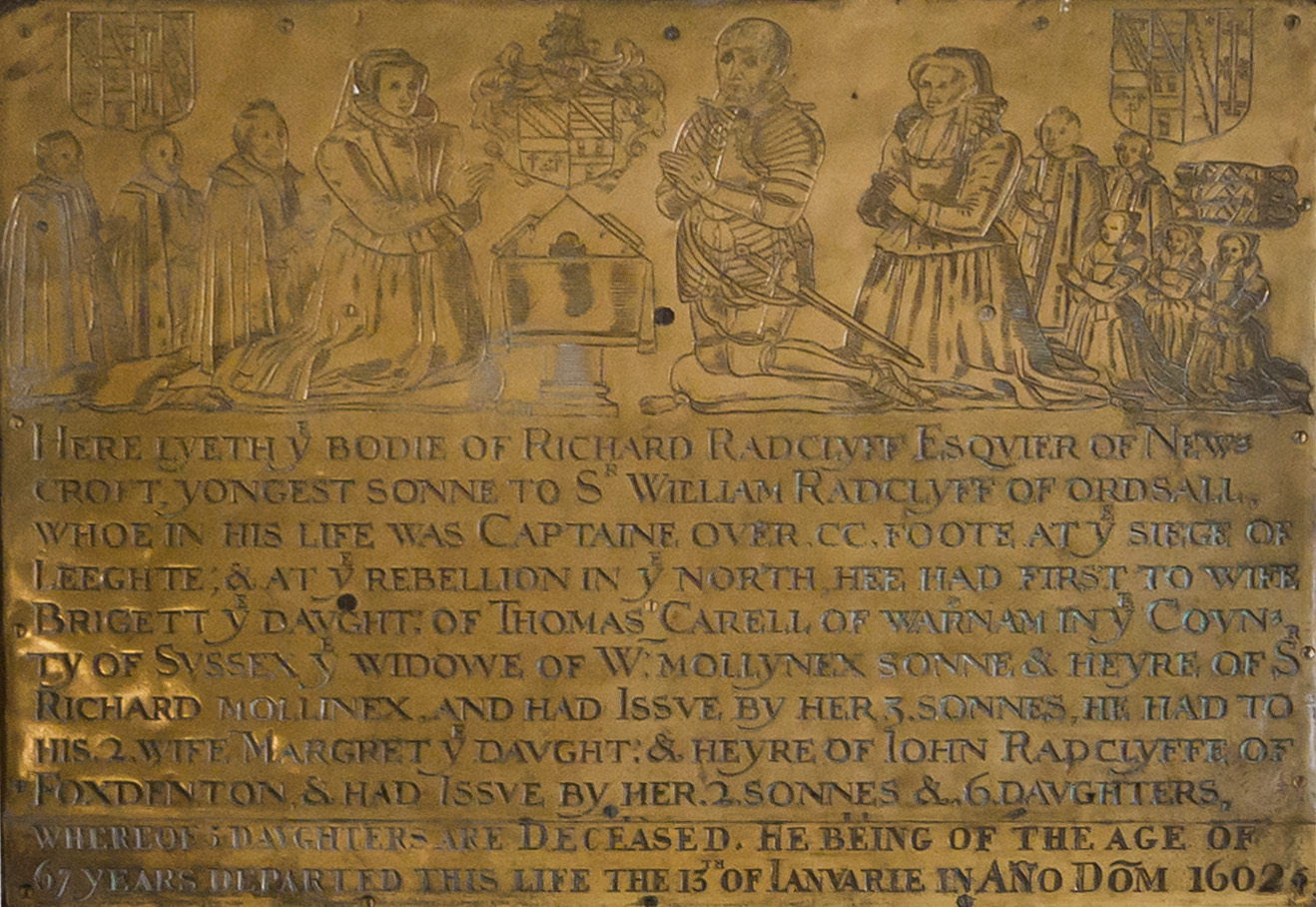
The Radclyff brass.

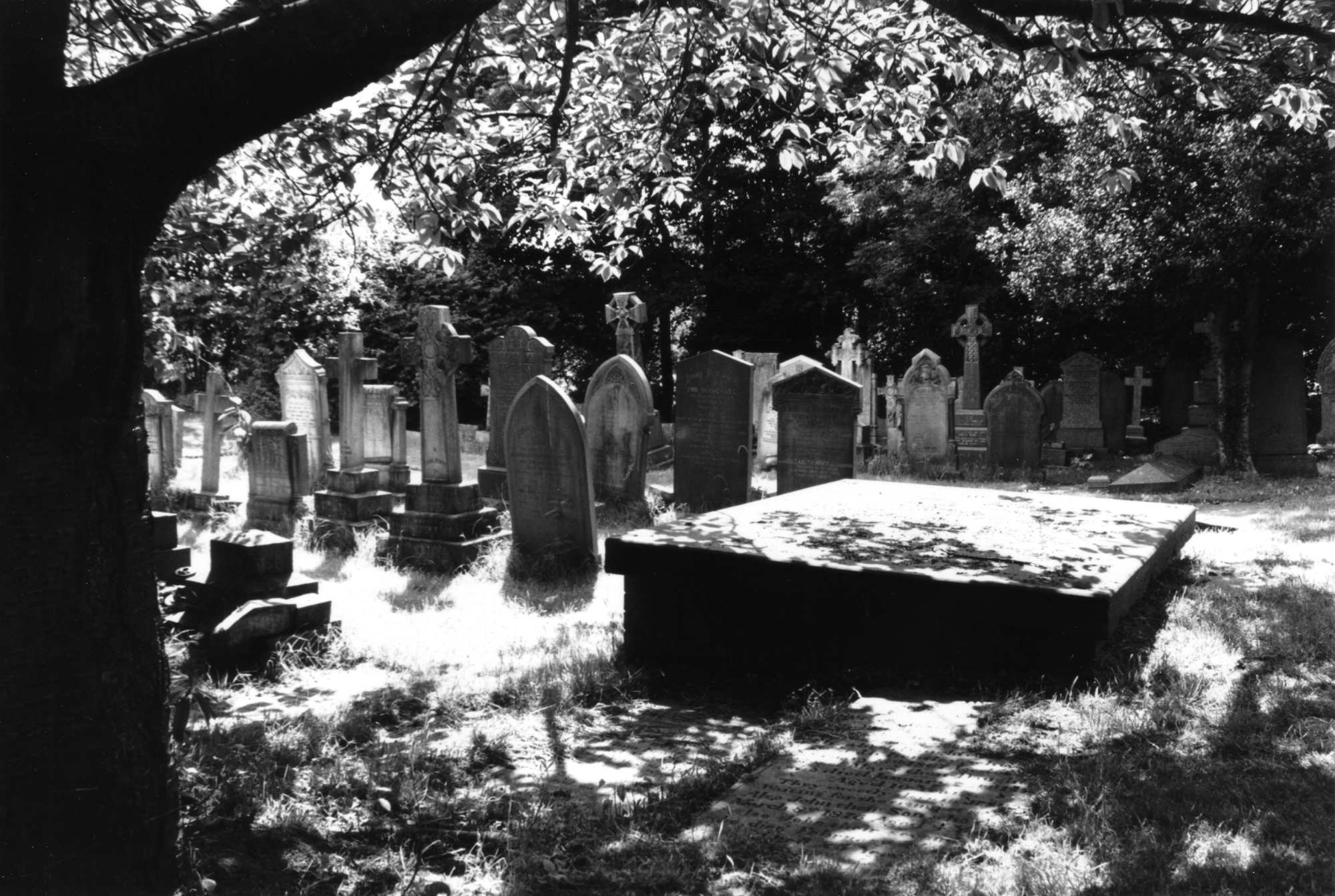
The churchyard.

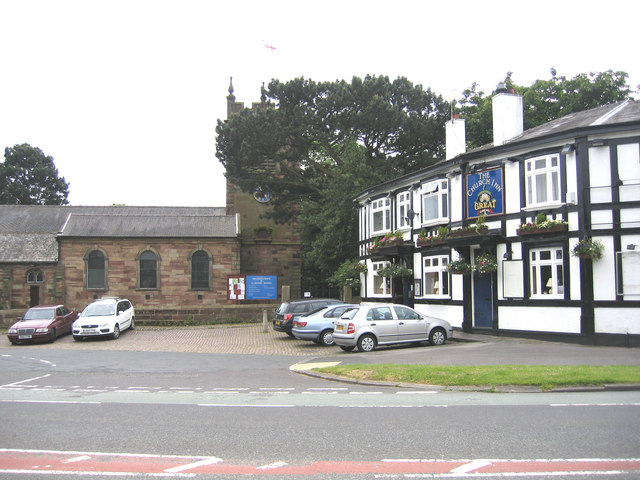
The church next to the Church Inn pub.

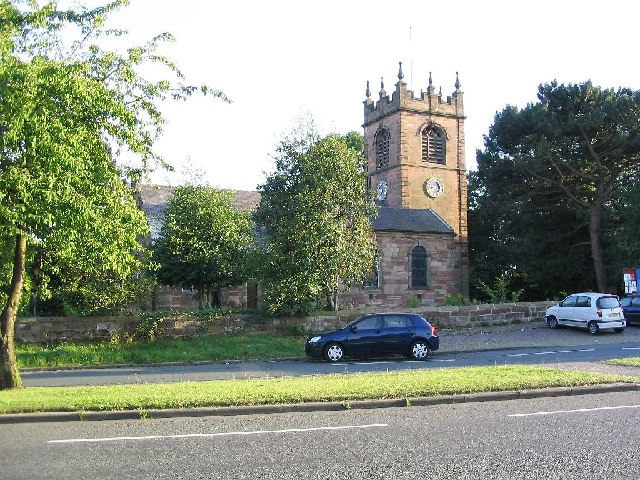
The church and carpark.

== See also ==
- Parish (Church of England)
- List of churches in Greater Manchester
- Listed buildings in Urmston (including Flixton)
