= Flixton House =

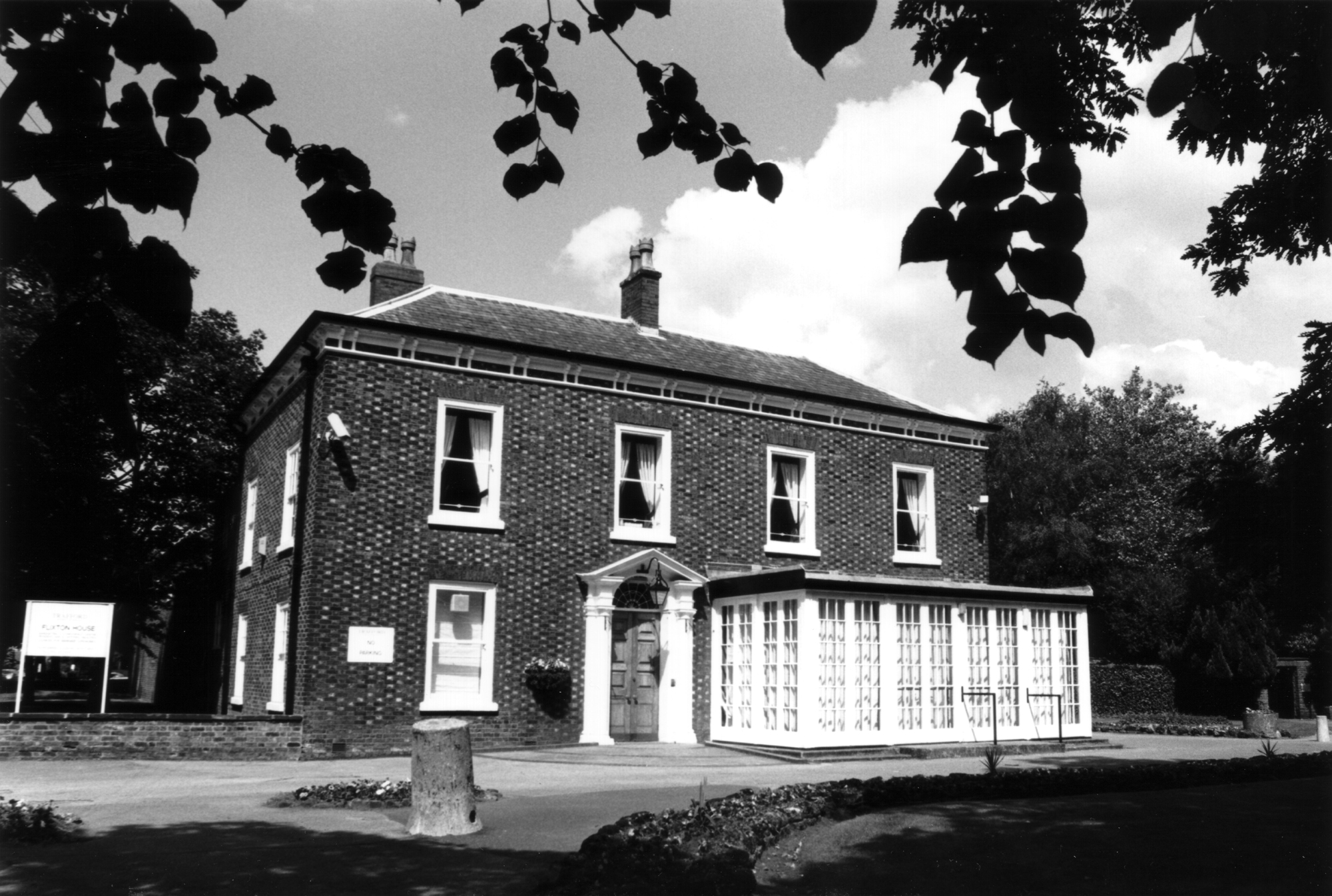
- Flixton House in Summer 2003
- Interactive map of the Flixton House area

General information
- Status: Grade II Listed Building
- Location: Flixton, Trafford, Flixton Rd, Urmston, Manchester M41 5GJ
- Coordinates: 53°26′44″N 2°23′0″W
- Landlord: Trafford Council

Website
- http://www.flixtonhouse.co.uk/Home.aspx

Flixton House was built in 1806 by the Wright family, who had become wealthy land owners in Flixton. It is a Queen Anne revival style country house, in Flemish bond brick, with neo-classical portico and fanlight. It is Grade II listed.

== Access dispute ==
Flixton House would probably have been quite unremarkable in a national context had Ralph Wright in 1826 not closed several footpaths across his estate, footpaths that the public had until then been allowed access to.

In response to the closure of those footpaths the people of Flixton initiated and funded a court case against Ralph Wright, one of the first footpath battles in England.

The people of Flixton won their case, and their success led to the creation of the Manchester Association for the Preservation of Ancient Footpaths in 1826.

== Subsequent history ==
Ralph Wright died in 1831. The Wright family continued to hold the house and land until the death of Samuel Worthington-Wright in 1934, following which Urmston Urban District Council acquired Flixton House and its 218 acres (0.88 km^{2}) of land for £69,793.

The park was officially opened to the public in 1935. The house and park are now owned by Trafford Council.

Flixton House along with its surrounding buildings was designated a Grade II listed building in 1981.

== Event Space ==
This Grade II listed building has been a wedding and events venue in Trafford for many years and is now owned and managed by Trafford Council.

In 2018 Flixton House recently underwent a drastic refurbishment. The venue has been updated with modern décor and furnishings whilst retaining many features from the early 19th century.
