= Urmston =

Town in Greater Manchester, England

- Town
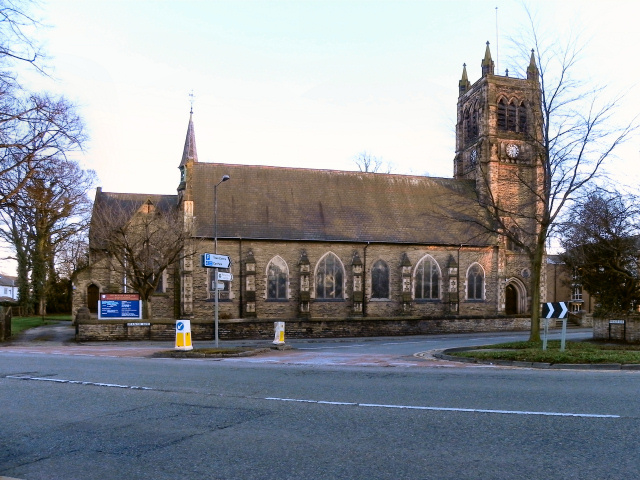
- St Clement's Church, Urmston

- Location within Greater Manchester
- Population: 41,731 (2021 Census)
  - Density: 10,881/sq mi (4,201/km^{2})
- OS grid reference: SJ766947
  - London: 165 mi (266 km) SE
- Metropolitan borough: Trafford
- Metropolitan county: Greater Manchester
- Region: North West
- Country: England
- Sovereign state: United Kingdom
- Post town: MANCHESTER
- Postcode district: M17, M41
- Dialling code: 0161
- Police: Greater Manchester
- Fire: Greater Manchester
- Ambulance: North West
- UK Parliament: Stretford and Urmston

Urmston /ˈɜːrmstən/ is a town in Trafford, Greater Manchester, England, which had a population of 41,731 at the 2021 Census. Historically in Lancashire, it is 5 miles (8.04672 km) southwest of Manchester city centre. The southern boundary is the River Mersey, with Stretford lying to the east and Flixton to the west. Davyhulme lies to the north of the town centre. Urmston covers an area of 4,799 acres (1,942.08639710976 ha).

The town has early medieval origins, and until the arrival of the railway in 1873 was a small farming community. The railway acted as a catalyst, transforming the town into a residence for the middle classes.

== History ==
In 1986 during an excavation by South Trafford Archaeological Group, fragments of Roman pottery were found in the area now occupied by the cemetery – previously the site of Urmston Old Hall – suggesting that there may have been a Roman settlement on the site. In the early 13th century, Lord Greenhalgh and his family lived at Highfield House (under what is now the M60 motorway).

Shortly after the Norman Conquest of England, between 1069 and 1070, William the Conqueror led a military campaign against the Saxon Earl Edwin, who ruled England north of the River Mersey. On the campaign's successful conclusion, William gave his kinsman Roger de Poictou all of the land between the River Mersey and the River Ribble. Part of this land was in turn given to Albert de Greslet, who towards the end of the 12th century, bestowed as much land as a team of oxen could plough in one-year on Orme Fitz Seward, the son of Edward Aylward. It is probable that the name Urmston is derived from Orme's Easton, or Ormestun, the "tun" or dwelling of Orme Fitz Seward.

The Manor of Urmston was rented by a family using the local surname. The earliest known member of the Urmston family is Richard de Urmston, who was recorded in 1193–94 as giving 40 shillings "for having the king's good will". Orme Fitz Seward's land passed to Richard de Trafford in the 13th century. The de Trafford family later lost the land, but won it back as the result of a duel.

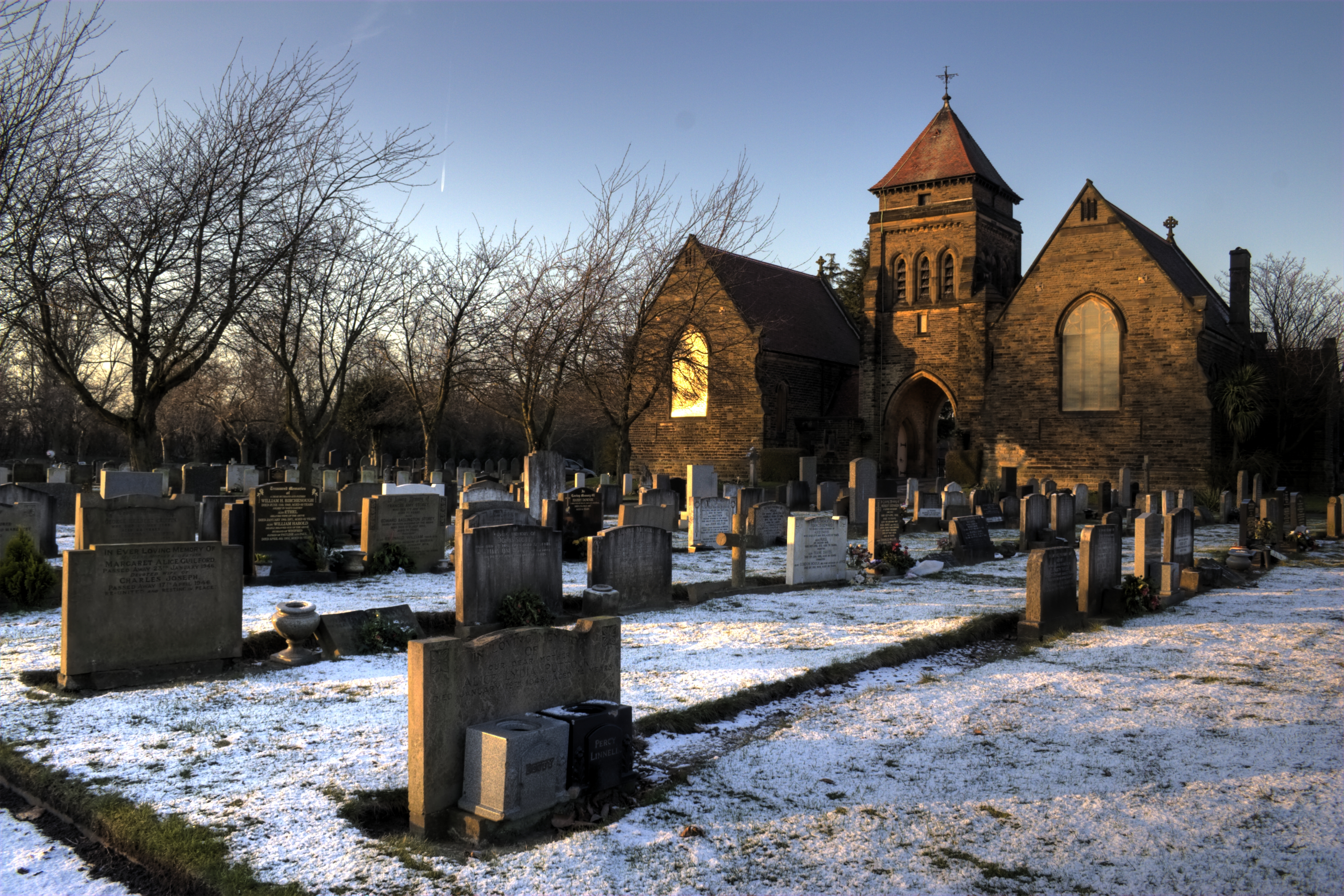
Urmston Cemetery

Urmston Old Hall was the home of the manorial lord, and a centre of power in the area during the Middle Ages. The Old Hall was completely rebuilt in brick and timber in the late 16th century. New Croft Hall, also in Urmston, was the residence of a wealthy freeman and may have been moated. Urmston was only one of three manors in Trafford to have had two medieval halls, the others being Hale and Timperley. Neither of the halls has survived to the present day. The modern-day descendants of the original inhabitants are still living locally, Both Lord M Gatward Snr and Jnr still reside in the area and can often be seen on horseback riding through their land close to the centre.

Farming was the main occupation in Urmston until the early 19th century, when weaving became a significant source of employment, although this later declined due to competition from large industry. In 1848, the population was recorded as being 771, with around 80% of the land being farmed. The opening of the Cheshire Lines Railway in 1873 allowed the town to grow as a commuter town: between 1871 and 1901 the population grew by over 650%, from 996 to 6,594. By 1901, farming had virtually died out, and the town became a residence for the middle classes.

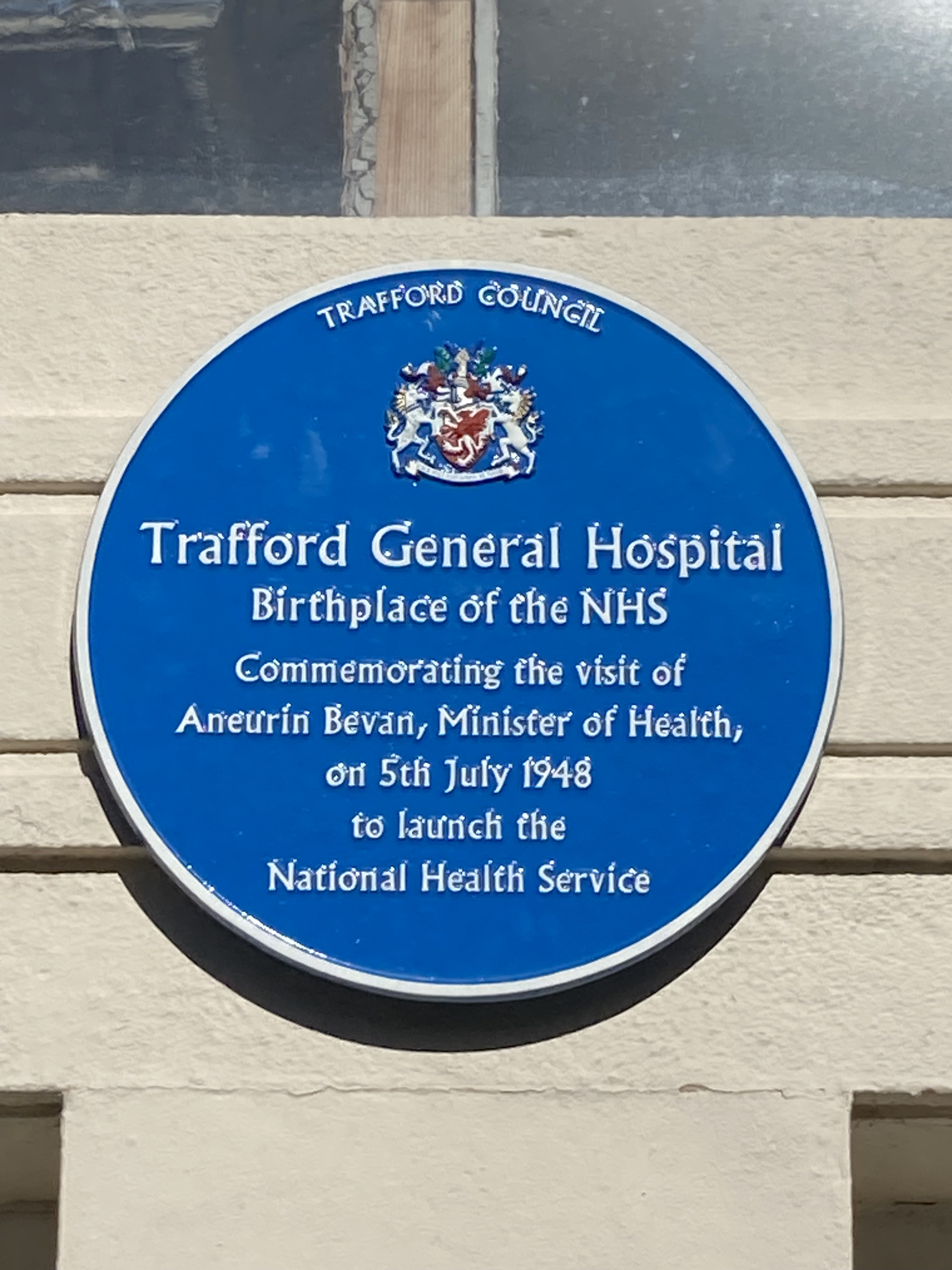
Blue Plaque at Trafford General Hospital

In 1948 the Minister for Health, Aneurin Bevan, conducted the symbolic inauguration of the National Health Service at Davyhulme's Park Hospital, now renamed Trafford General Hospital.

The area was home to the first District heating system in England. In operation by 1948, a boiler house supplied hot water to 200 homes on a newly built housing estate.

The water was heated with low-grade fuels such as peat and coke, with houses built in groups of four for better efficiency.

A blue plaque commemorating the birth of the NHS on 5 July 1948 can be found on display at the hospital entrance. It was unveiled in 2018 by the Mayor of Greater Manchester and Andy Burnham to mark 70 years of the NHS.

== Governance ==
Coat of Arms of the former Urmston Urban District Council.

Once a township in the parish of Flixton, Urmston became an urban district of the administrative county of Lancashire, under the Local Government Act 1894. The Local Government Act 1972 abolished the Urban District of Urmston and in 1974 Urmston became a district of the Metropolitan Borough of Trafford, in the metropolitan county of Greater Manchester.

The parliamentary constituency of Stretford and Urmston was formed in 1997. Andrew Western, a member of the Labour Party, has served as the MP for the constituency since he was elected in a 2022 by-election.

Urmston is one of the four major urban areas in Trafford, the other three being Altrincham, Sale and Stretford. In local elections for Trafford Council, Urmston is split into four wards: Davyhulme East, Davyhulme West, Flixton and Urmston. Like every other ward in Trafford they are each represented by three local councillors, giving Urmston 12 of the 63 seats on Trafford Council.

== Geography ==
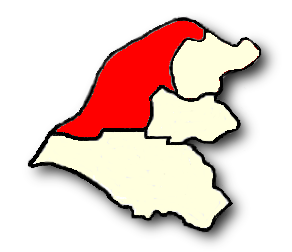
Metropolitan Borough of Trafford, highlighting Urmston in red.

Urmston occupies an area of 7.5 square miles (19.4 km^{2}), at 53°26′55″N 2°22′29″W (53.4487, −2.3747); it is approximately 137 feet (42 m) above sea level at its highest point. The land is relatively flat, sloping gently from north to south. Urmston's climate is generally temperate, with few extremes of temperature or weather. The mean temperature is slightly above average for the United Kingdom. Annual rainfall and average amount of sunshine are both slightly below the average for the UK.

Urmston borders Davyhulme, Dumplington and Flixton, with the River Mersey forming the southern boundary. The most southerly part of Urmston lies within the flood plain of the River Mersey, an area known as Urmston Meadows, part of the Mersey Valley. Much work was carried out in the 1970s to canalise the Mersey, in an effort to speed up the flow of floodwater and thus reduce the risk of flooding. Upstream emergency floodbasins such as Sale Water Park, lying just to the east of Urmston, have also been constructed. The M60 Manchester orbital motorway passes through the northern half of Urmston, from southeast to northwest, and the M62 motorway lies just to the west. The Thirlmere Aqueduct also passes through the Urmston area.

== Demography ==
Urmston ethnicity compared
2001 UK Census	Urmston	Trafford	England
Total population	40,964	210,145	49,138,831
White	96.8%	91.6%	90.9%
Asian	1.0%	4.1%	4.6%
Black	0.7%	2.0%	2.3%

As of the 2001 UK census, Urmston had a population of 40,964. The population density was 10,881 inhabitants per square mile (4,201/km^{2}), and for every 100 females, there were 93.0 males. Of the 19,172 households in Urmston, 39.9% were married couples living together, 29.6% were one-person households, 7.7% were co-habiting couples and 8.9% were lone parents. Of those aged 16–74 in Urmston, 25.5% had no academic qualifications, slightly high compared to 21.3% for all of Trafford but slightly lower than the 28.9% in England.

Population growth in Urmston since 1801
Year	1801	1811	1821	1831	1841	1851	1861	1871	1881	1891	1901	1911	1921	1931	1939	1951	1961	1971	1981	1991	2001
Population	532	595	645	706	771	730	748	996	2,242	4,042	6,594	7,912	8,297	9,284	33,163	39,237	43,068	44,563	44,030	41,804	40,964
Civil Parish 1861–1891 • Urban District 1901–1971 • Urban Subdivision 1981–2001 • Other Data

== Economy ==
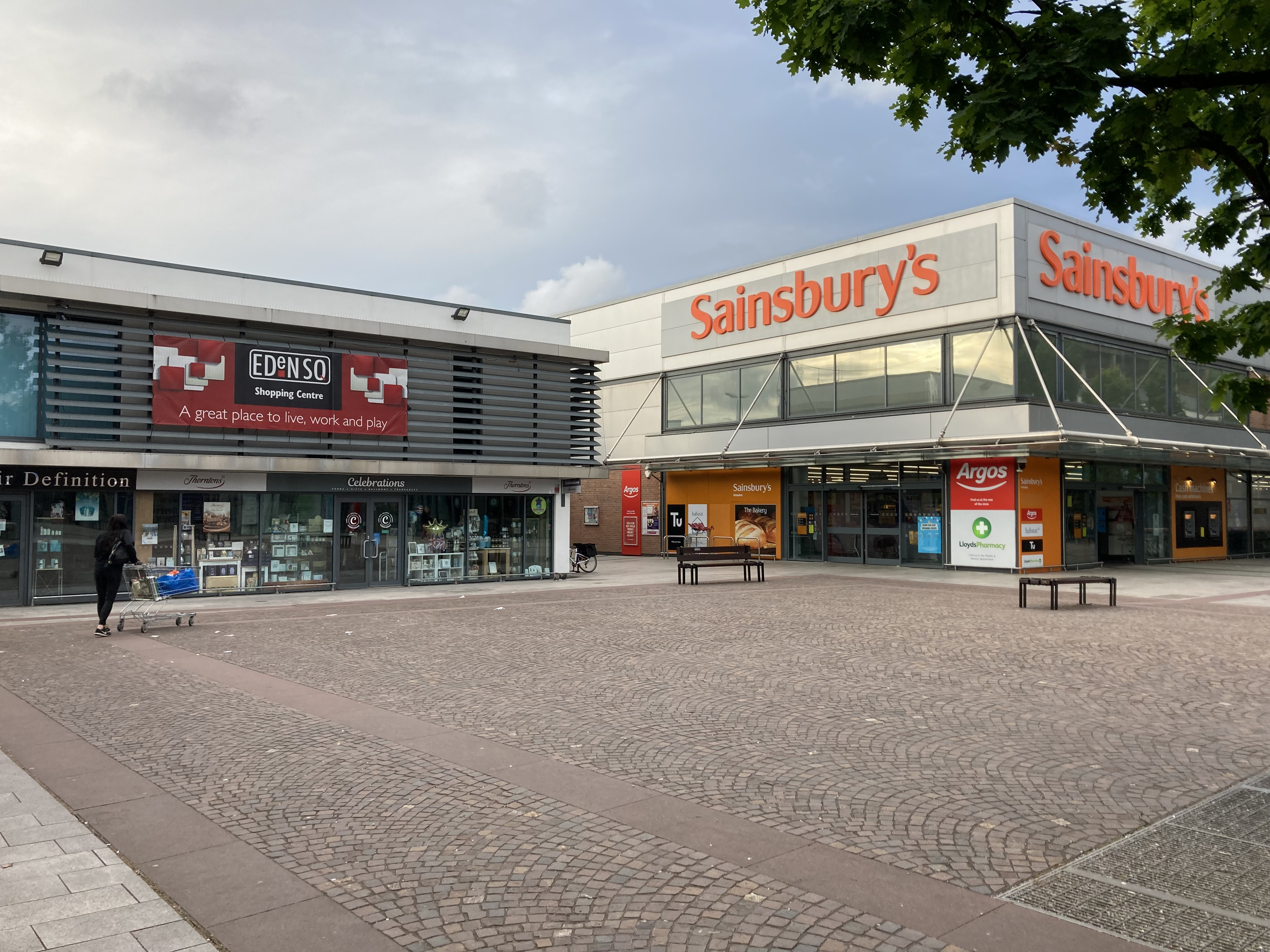
Eden Square, Urmston - May 2022

The Trafford Centre, a large shopping and leisure complex, is at Dumplington. Some locals felt that it brought about the decline of Urmston Precinct, the town's central shopping area – dating back to the 1960s – where many units closed or became "pound shops". Beginning in 2007, Urmston Precinct was demolished and a £45 million redevelopment of the site got underway, to include 140,000 square feet (13,000 m^{2}) of retail and leisure space and 144 apartments. This redevelopment project is now known as Eden Square, open between 2009 and 2012 and includes several chain stores long with independent retailers.

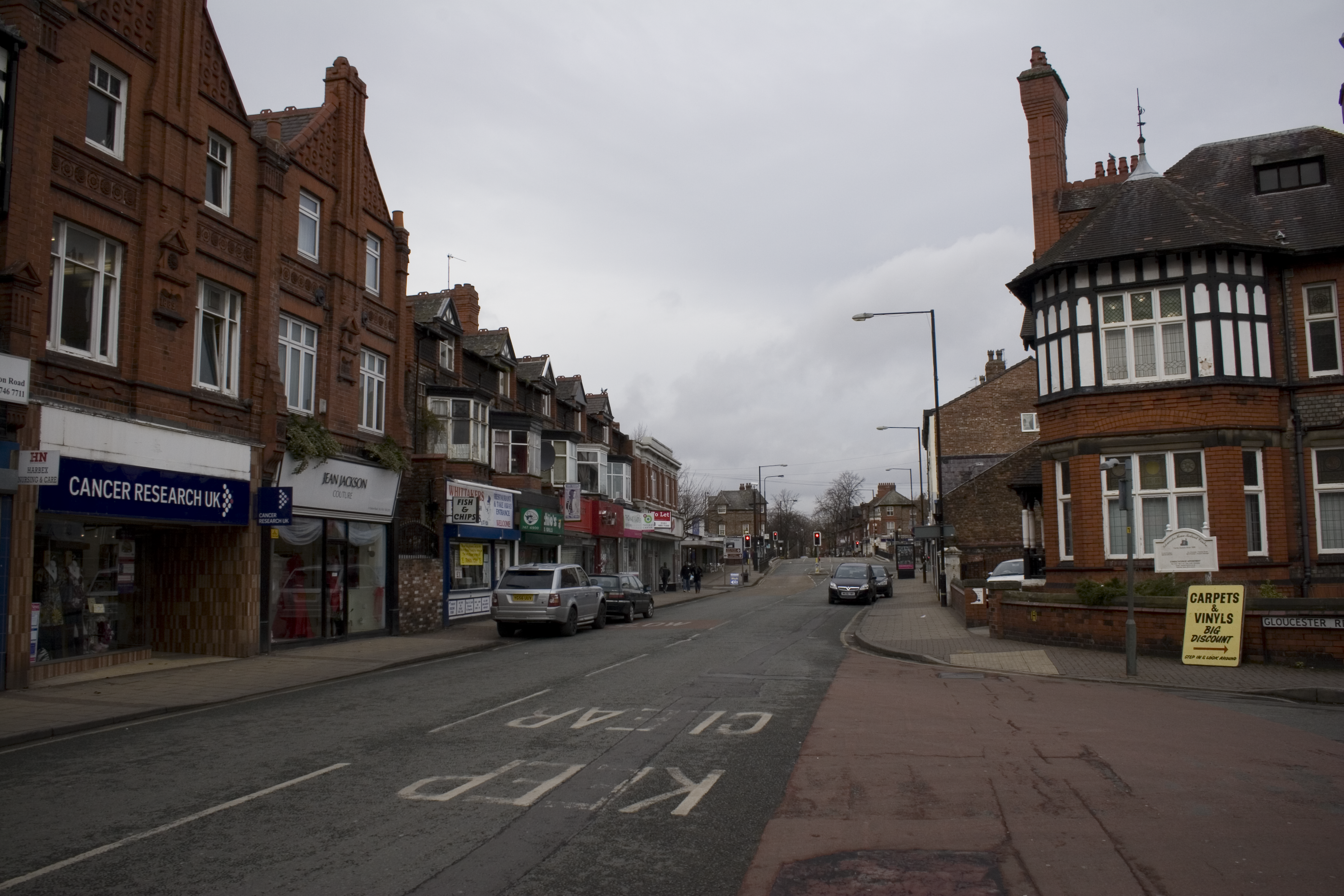
Station Road in Urmston

As of the 2001 UK census, Urmston had a possible workforce of approximately 32,996 people. The economic activity of residents in Urmston was 46.1% in full-time employment, 12.6% in part-time employment, 6.9% self-employed, 2.1% unemployed, 2.5% students with jobs, 3.0% students without jobs, 14.7% retired, 4.5% looking after home or family, 5.4% permanently sick or disabled and 2.2% economically inactive for other reasons. Urmston has a low rate of unemployment (2.1%) compared with Trafford (2.7%) and England (3.3%). The Office for National Statistics estimated that during the period of April 2001 to March 2002 the average gross weekly income of households in Urmston was £504 (£26,209 per year).

According to the 2001 UK census, the industry of employment of residents in Urmston was 17.1% retail and wholesale, 14.0% health and social work, 13.9% manufacturing, 13.4% property and business services, 8.1% transport and communications, 7.2% education, 6.8% construction, 5.3% finance, 4.9% public administration and defence, 3.4% hotels and restaurants, 0.9% energy and water supply, 0.4% agriculture, 0.1% in mining, and 4.3% other. This was roughly in line with national figures.

== Culture ==
=== Cultural events and venues ===
Urmston Musical Theatre was formed as the Urmston and District Operatic Society in 1911. Its current president is actor Matthew Kelly, who was born in Urmston. It performs an adult main show in October with rehearsals running from June to October and a pantomime in January/February with rehearsals running from November to the date of the show. Both shows are performed at the Poolside Theatre within the Urmston Leisure Centre. Its youth section performs a show in May at St Antony's Catholic College in Urmston.

Canterbury Players is a local amateur dramatic society. Performances are given on stage at the Davyhulme (Wesley) Methodist Church located in Brook Road, Flixton. In the mid-20th century there were 20 cinemas in Trafford, of which the only survivor is the New Curzon, in Princess Road. It opened in 1931 as the Curzon. It was converted to a twin cinema and bingo club in the 1970s, and re-opened under its present name of the New Curzon in 1980, after a £100,000 conversion. Since 2003, the building has been shared with Flixton Dance Studio. Recently, due to financial reasons, the New Curzon has been forced to close down.

St Clements Church on Manor Avenue, as well as being a place of worship, is also a venue for concerts and other events and is often used by local musical bands, amateur and semi-professional; local societies, and local schools for their concerts and special events.

=== The Beatles ===
Urmston's council once booked the Beatles to play at the Urmston Show, which was scheduled to take place at Abbotsfield Park on 5 August 1963. The Beatles were not well known when the booking was made, but had quickly become massively popular by the time of the show. The show's host David Hamilton later recalled, "The boys were smuggled in in a van ... screaming girls rushed the stage, trying to get hold of their idols ... it was certainly a hard day's night."

=== Sport ===
Urmston Cricket Club was founded in 1846 as Urmston & Flixton Cricket Club. As well as serving as a social club, it expanded to include other sports including hockey, tennis, and bowls. The club has been located on Moorside Road since 1870. Urmston Riding Club was established in 1956 on Southgate on the Urmston–Flixton border, and has approximately 150 members.

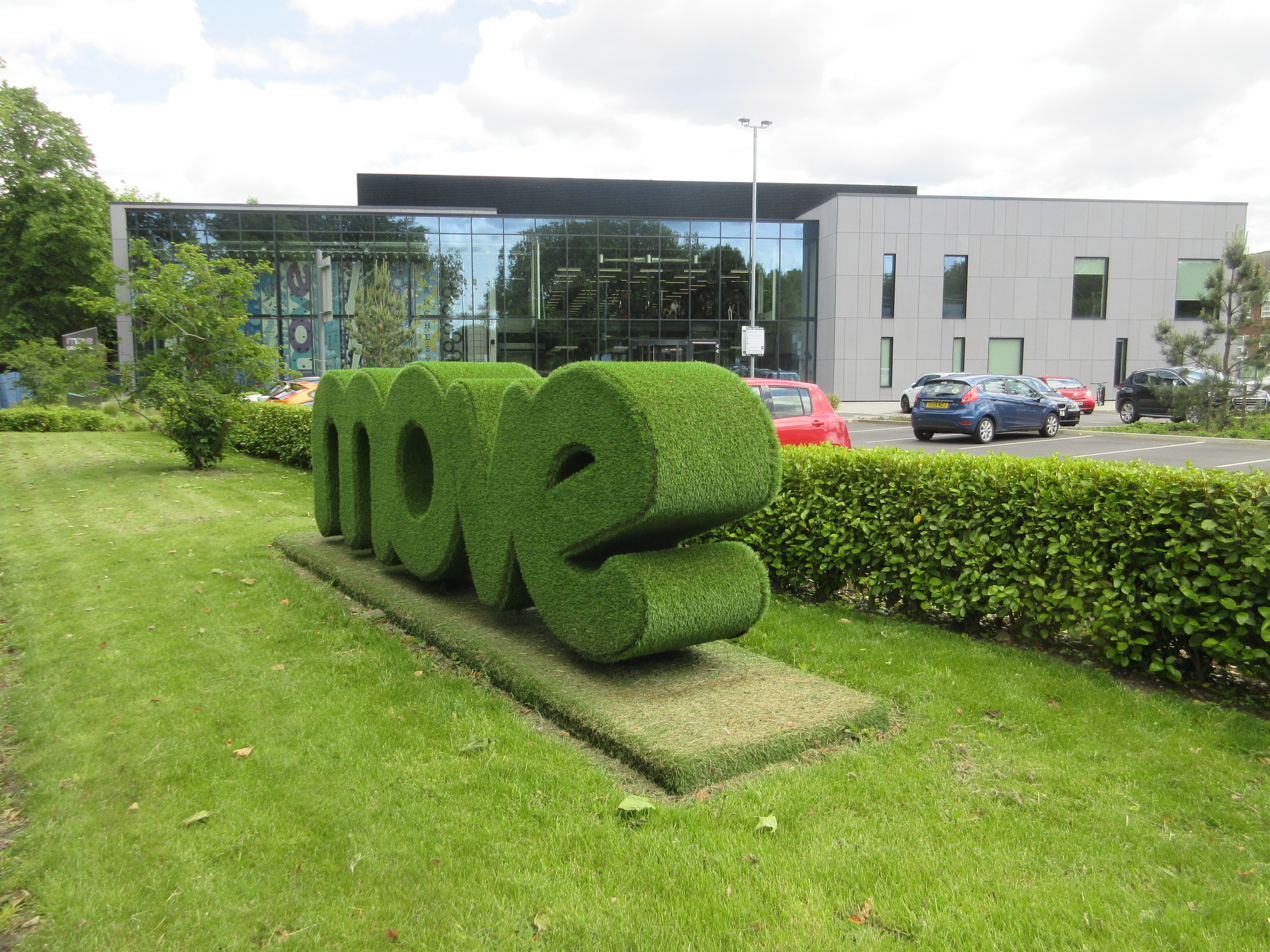
Move Urmston - May 2022

AFC Urmston Meadowside provides kids football coaching facilities, and has teams ranging from under 5s to under 17s as well as adult teams. The club was founded in 1977, as Meadowside Athletic FC, and has won the Manchester County FA Youth Cup.

Urmston has two leisure centres: owned by Trafford Council: Move Urmston and George H Carnall.

'Move Urmston' originally opened in 1989 and has undergone a £7m expansion opening in 2020. Move Urmston's facilities include a glass façade with seven metre clip n' climb wall, a large fitness suite with the latest cardio and strength equipment, a functional training zone, modern changing village, three fitness and wellbeing studios, a 25-metre L-shaped swimming pool, a five-court sports hall, brand new café.

George H Carnall Centre will be transferred from Council operation to the community

== Transport ==
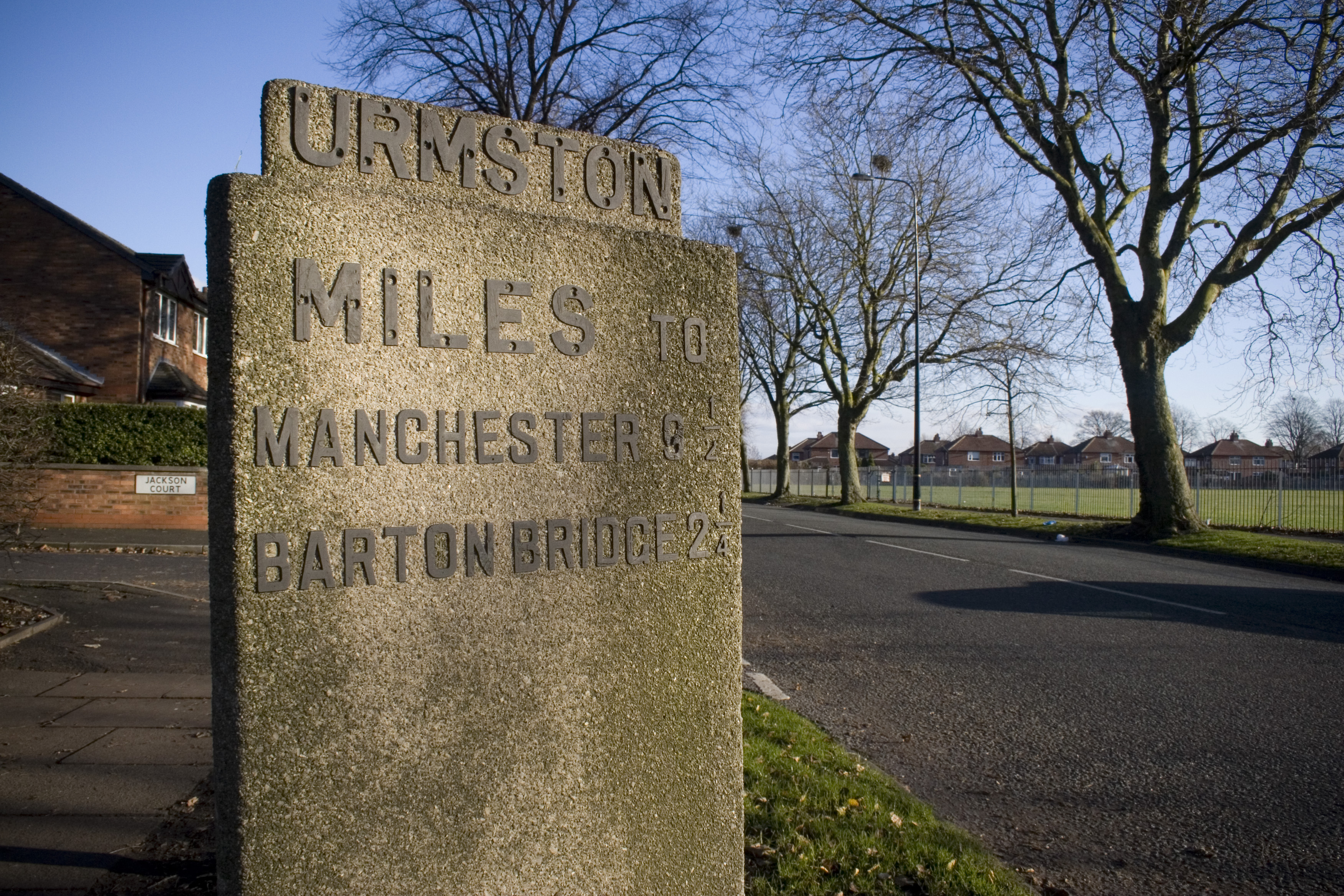
A milestone erected to commemorate the opening of Bowfell Road, in 1937

Urmston sits to the west of Junctions 9 and 10 on the outside of the M60 orbital motorway. A junction previously existed on Stretford Road further east along the motorway under its old M63 designation, but was closed on the opening of the A6144(M) in 1987. A well known local landmark, opened in 1960, is the Barton High level motorway bridge, which spans the Manchester Ship Canal.

Lostock Road, which connects Davyhulme Circle to Barton Road, was from 1936 to 1937 widened to include two protected cycle tracks. The scheme, designed by borough surveyor Ernest Leeming and intended to improve transport connections between the neighbouring towns, was completed by October 1937. In July 2024, a blue plaque in honour of Ernest Leeming went on display in Davyhulme Park. It was sponsored by the Urmston and District History Society.

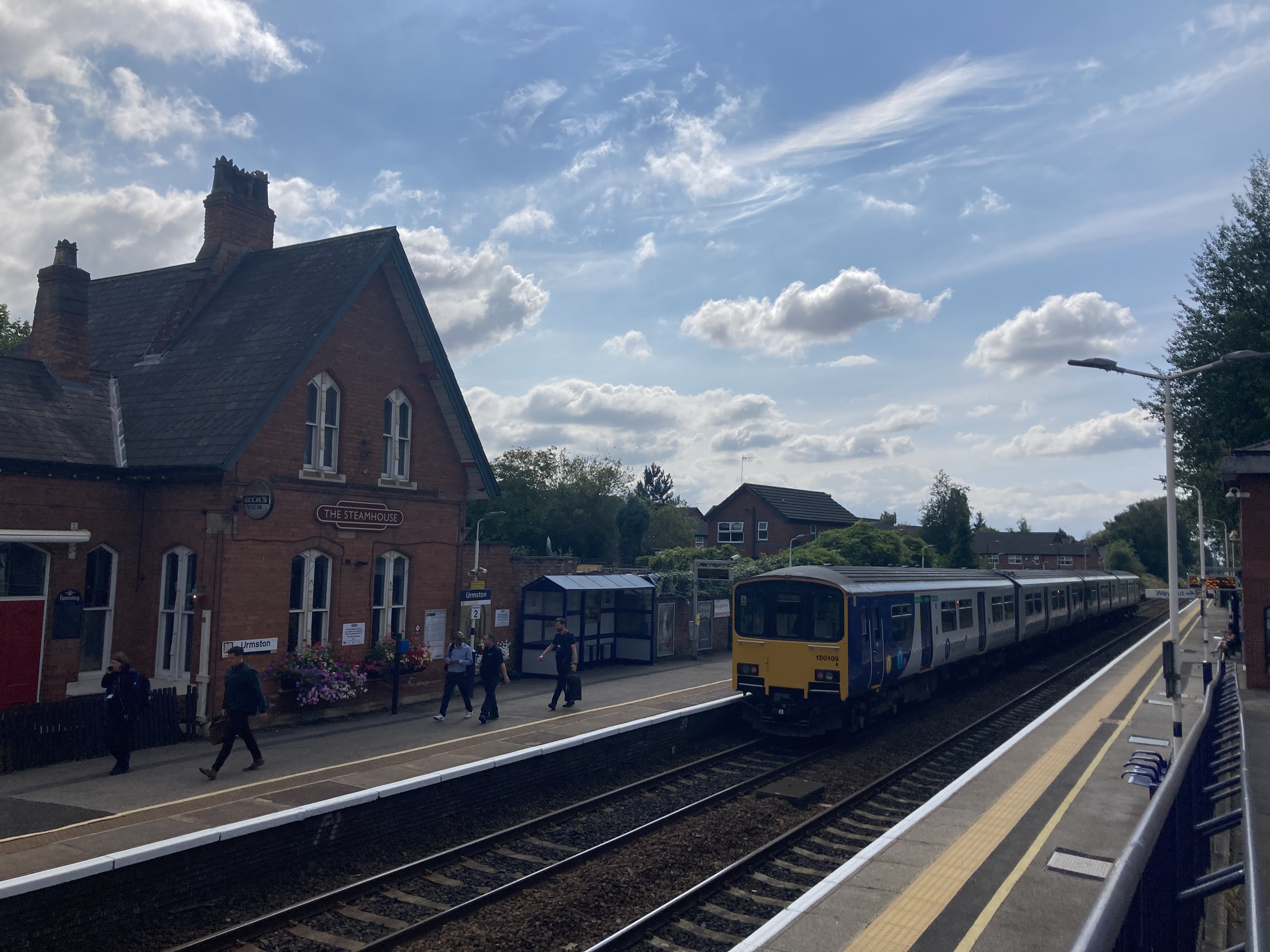
Urmston Railway Station - Aug 2022

Urmston is connected to Liverpool and Manchester by the Cheshire Lines Committee railway line which passes through Warrington and Liverpool South Parkway (for Liverpool John Lennon Airport). There are three railway stations in the Urmston area (Urmston station in Urmston town centre, Chassen Road and Flixton stations in neighbouring Flixton). Trains stopping at these stations are operated by Northern Trains. Urmston is not served by Metrolink but there are stop at the nearby Trafford Centre and in neighbouring Stretford and Eccles.

Pre-1969, most bus services were provided by Manchester Corporation Transport and the North Western Road Car Company. North Western had a depot on Higher Road in Urmston town centre which was owned by Trafford Council before being sold in 2021. The services of both undertakings transferred into SELNEC (South East Lancashire, North East Cheshire, later to become the Greater Manchester Passenger Transport Executive, and then on 1 April 2011 renamed to Transport for Greater Manchester. Today, the area is generally well served by both commercially operated and tendered bus services. Some areas have a frequent service of every 10–15 minutes on some routes, with half-hourly and hourly frequencies on other routes. Services are run by the Bee Network, providing transport to many parts of Greater Manchester including Manchester city centre, Eccles, Stockport, the Airport the Trafford Centre and Altrincham

== Education ==
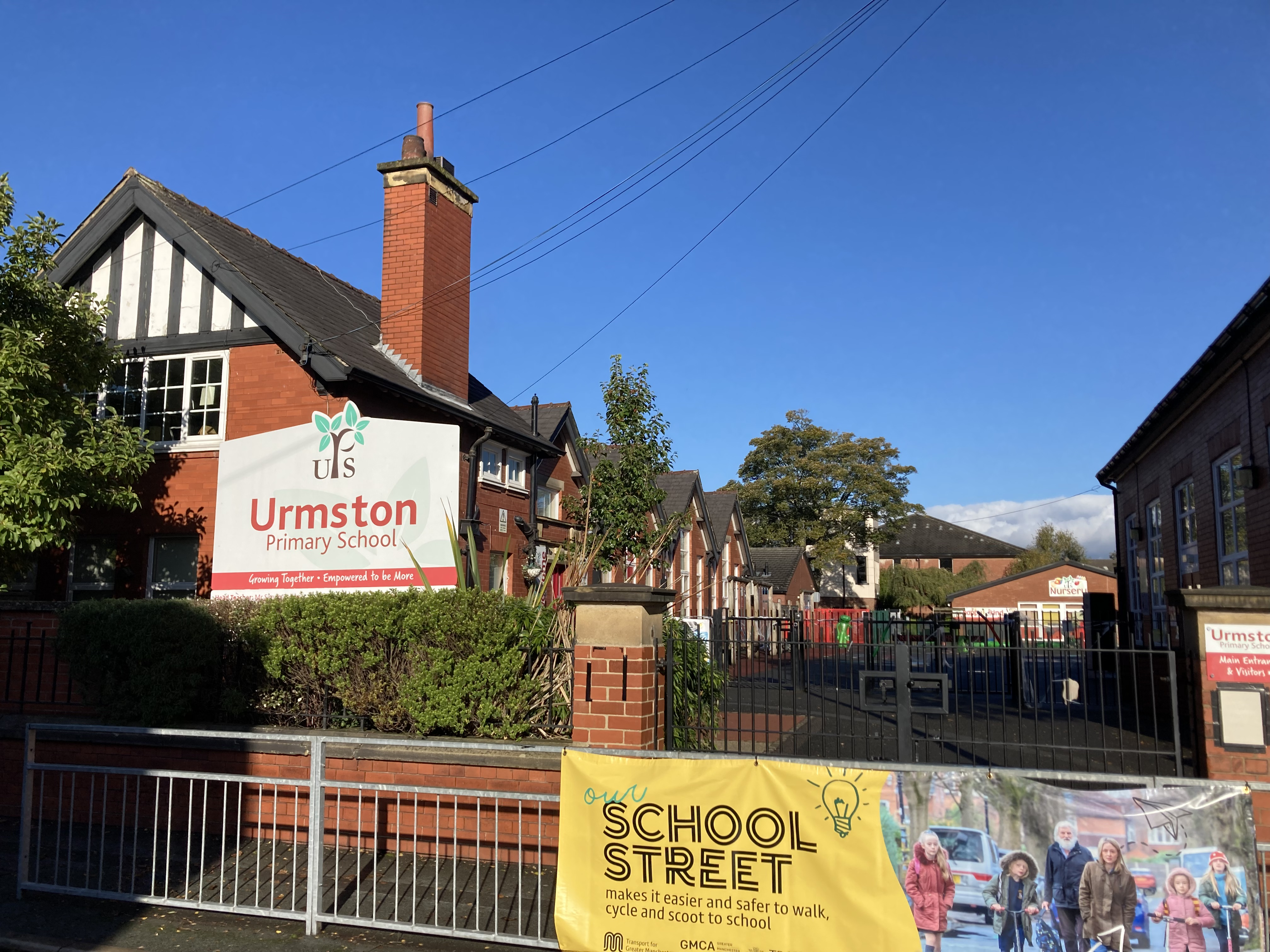
Urmston Primary School, Wycliffe Road - Oct 2023

Along with the rest of Trafford, Urmston maintains a selective education system assessed by the 11-plus examination.

There are four primary, infant or junior schools in Urmston, including Urmston Primary School, together with an independent prep school, Abbotsford Preparatory School, in addition to four secondary schools, Urmston Grammar School, St Antony's Roman Catholic School, Wellacre Academy and Flixton Girls' School.

Urmston Grammar School is a specialist science and language college; the school was assessed as "outstanding" in its February 2006 Ofsted report. St Antony's Catholic College is a specialist Business and Enterprise College. In its October 2005 Ofsted report the school was assessed as "a good and improving school with some outstanding features".

== Religion ==
Urmston religions compared
2001 UK Census	Urmston	Trafford	England
Total population	40,964	210,145	49,138,831
Christian	81.5%	75.8%	71.7%
Muslim	0.8%	3.3%	3.1%
Sikh	0.1%	0.5%	0.7%
Hindu	0.2%	0.6%	1.1%
Buddhist	0.1%	0.2%	0.3%
Jewish	0.1%	1.1%	0.5%
No religion	11.2%	12.0%	14.6%

As of the 2001 UK census, 82.3% of Urmston's residents reported themselves as being Christian, 0.8% Muslim, 0.2% Hindu, 0.1% Jewish, 0.1% Buddhist and 0.1% Sikh. The census recorded 10.5% as having no religion, 0.1% had an alternative religion and 6.6% did not state their religion. Urmston is in the Catholic Diocese of Salford, and the Church of England Diocese of Manchester.

There are three listed churches in Urmston: the Church of St Clement (Grade II), the Church of St Michael's (Grade II*), and the Church of All Saints (Grade I).

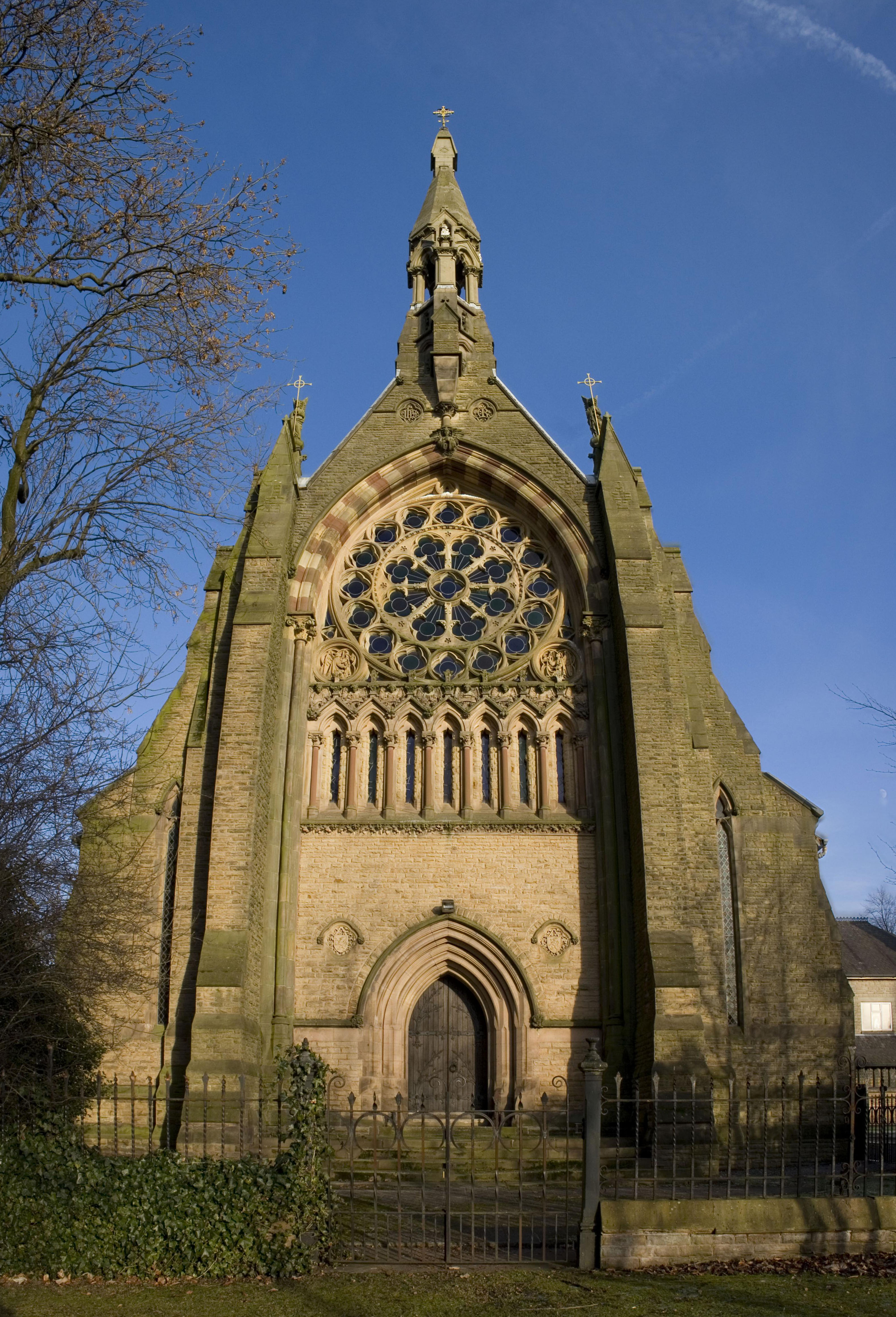
Church of All Saints.

The Church of All Saints was built in 1867–68 by E. W. Pugin, in the Gothic Revival style; the church is said to be a "notably complete and unspoiled" example of Pugin's best work. St Clement's Church was built in 1868 by J Medland Taylor, also in the Gothic Revival style. The Church of St Michael was first mentioned in 1189–91 although may be even older. It was rebuilt in 1815, 1824, and 1888. There are two listed structures in the grounds of the church, the sundial and the Jones Chest tomb. The Church of St Michael is one of 11 Grade II* listed buildings in Trafford, and All Saints is one of six Grade I listed buildings in Trafford.

== Notable people ==
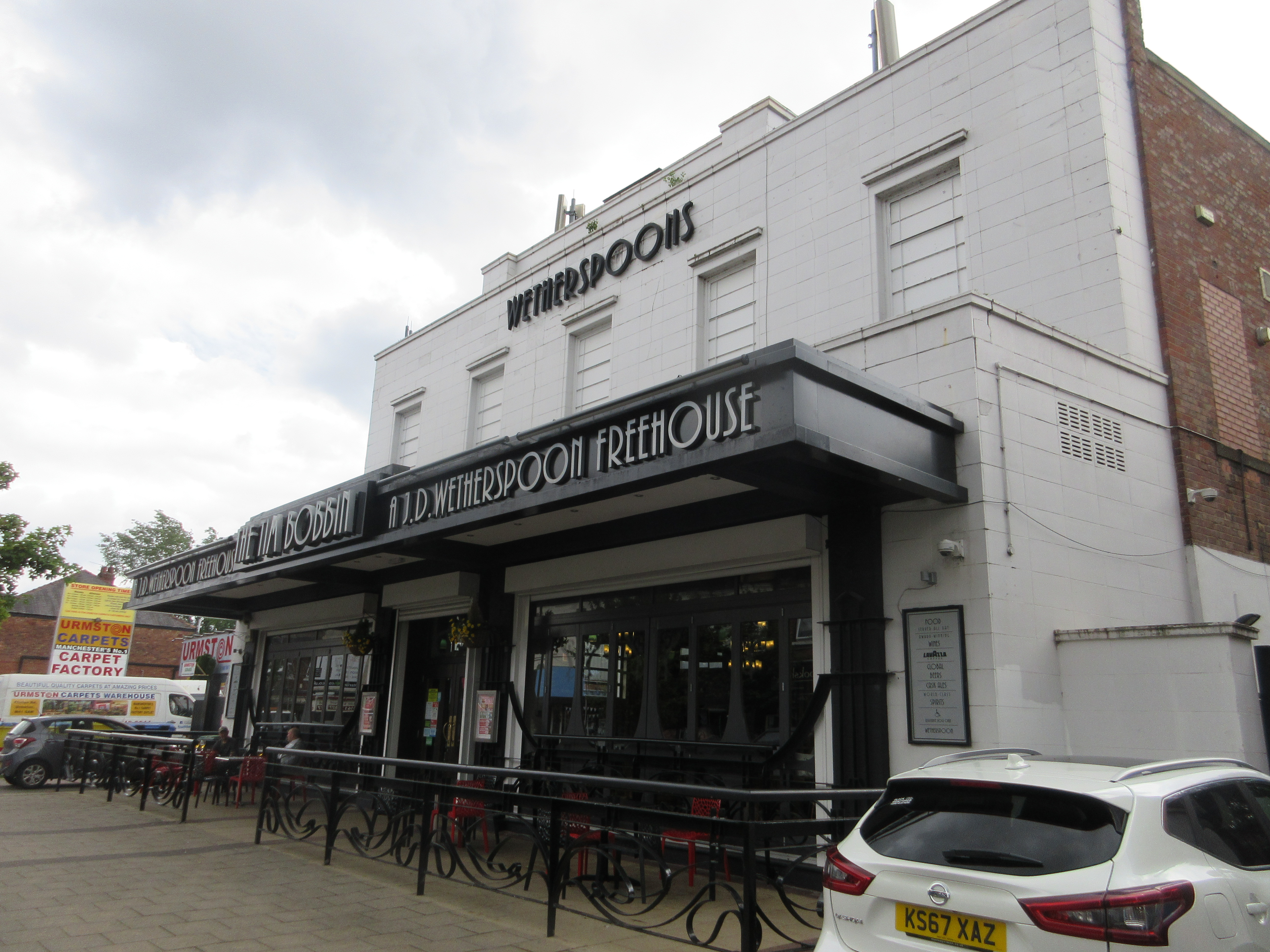
The Tim Bobbin - May 2022

The 18th-century caricaturist and satirical poet John Collier (1708–1786), who used the pseudonym Tim Bobbins, was born in Urmston. A self-styled Lancashire Hogarth, his first and most famous work, A View of the Lancashire Dialect, or, Tummus and Mary, appeared in 1746, the earliest significant piece of published Lancashire dialect. A local public house in an old art-deco style building on Flixton Road, The Tim Bobbin, is named after him.

and

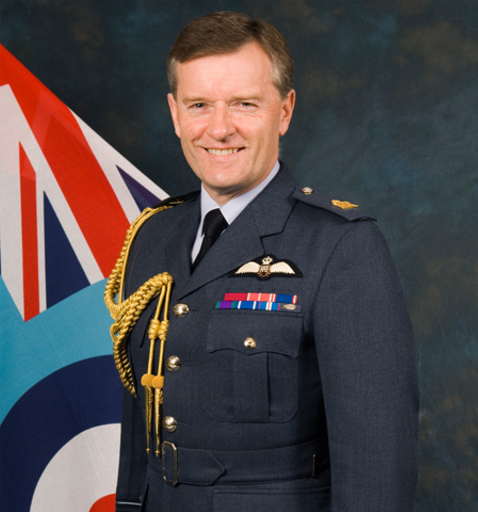
Sir Christopher Moran, 2010

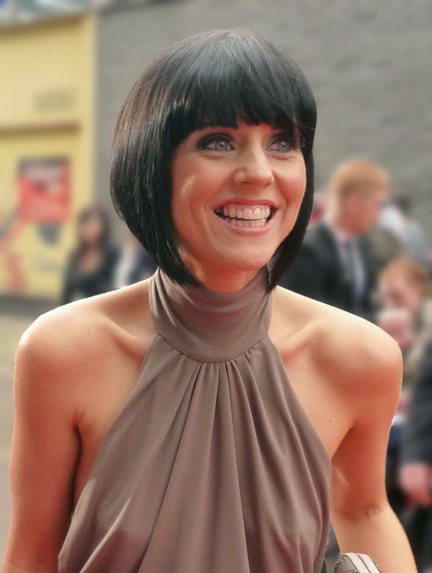
Stephanie Waring, 2011

- George Coulouris (1903–1989), an English film and stage actor, brought up in Urmston.
- Lionel du Toit (1903–1979), priest, Dean of Carlisle, from 1960 to 1973.
- Fred Yates (1922–2008), artist, inspired by the Manchester painter L. S. Lowry
- Eileen Derbyshire (born 1931), actress, played Emily Bishop in the soap opera Coronation Street
- Brian Green (1933–2021), an English mass spectrometrist.
- Lynda Baron (1939–2022), actress, played Nurse Gladys Emmanuel in Open All Hours,
- Debbie Moore (born 1946), a retired model, businesswoman and founder of Pineapple Dance Studios
- Keith Hopwood (born 1946), the rhythm guitarist of Herman's Hermits, attended Urmston Grammar School.
- Judy Loe (1947–2025), actress; mother of Kate Beckinsale (born 1973), and widow of Richard Beckinsale (1947–1979).
- Matthew Kelly (born 1950), an English actor and TV presenter.
- Sir Christopher Moran (1956–2010), a fast jet pilot and later Commander-in-Chief of RAF Air Command
- Suzanne Charlton (born 1962), BBC weather presenter and daughter of Bobby Charlton, was born in Urmston,
- Paul Stenning (born 1976), ghostwriter and author, attended Urmston Grammar School, lived locally.
- Stephanie Waring (born 1978), actress, played Cindy Cunningham in and Channel 4's Hollyoaks
- Youngr (born 1989) a singer, songwriter, producer and musician; solo artist since 2016.
- Danielle Hope (born 1992), actress and singer; the winner of BBC TV's Over the Rainbow, lived locally.

=== Sport ===
- Billy Boardman (1895−1968) footballer who played 182 games for Doncaster Rovers
- Christine Benning (born 1955), former middle-distance runner, silver medallist at the 1978 Commonwealth Games
- Tom Brady (born 1991), rugby union player who played 132 games for Sale Sharks
- Jim Branagan (born 1955), footballer who played 294 games for Blackburn Rovers
- Andy Halls (born 1992), footballer who has played over 380 games including 152 for Macclesfield Town
- David Herd (1934–2016), a Scottish footballer, played 430 games including 202 for Manchester United and 5 for Scotland, had a local home and owned a local garage that still bears his name.
- Michael Johnson (born 1988) footballer who played in the Premier League for Manchester City
- Peter Phoenix (1936–2020), footballer who played 241 games including 161 for Oldham Athletic
- Peter Thorne (born 1973), footballer, who played 485 games including 158 for Stoke City
- Dave Waller (born 1963), footballer who played 340 games including 168 for Crewe Alexandra
- David White (born 1967), footballer who played 394 games including 286 for Manchester City

== See also ==
- Listed buildings in Urmston
