= St Antony's Roman Catholic School =

Location
- Bradfield Road; Urmston, Greater Manchester, M41 9PD; England
- Coordinates: 53.449°N 2.338°W

Information
- Type: Academy
- Religious affiliation: Roman Catholic
- Local authority: Trafford
- Trust: Emmaus Catholic Academy Trust
- Department for Education URN: 148026 Tables
- Ofsted: Reports
- Head teacher: Fiona Wright
- Gender: Coeducational
- Age: 11 to 16
- Website: https://st-antonys.com/

St Antony's Roman Catholic School is a coeducational Roman Catholic secondary school in Urmston, Greater Manchester, England.

The school was formed in 1992 from the merger of three Catholic secondary schools; St Mary's, Stretford, which opened in 1952, Cardinal Vaughan, Stretford, which opened in 1964, and St Paul's, Urmston, in whose modernised buildings St Antony's was established.

== Notable former pupils ==
=== St. Mary's Secondary Modern School ===
- Morrissey, former singer of The Smiths in the 1980s
- Tony Whelan, former player for Manchester United 1968 - 1973. Also Academy Coach & advisor at Manchester United 1990–Present
- Tyler Blackett, former player for Manchester United
