= Flixton, Greater Manchester =

Suburb in Greater Manchester, England

Flixton
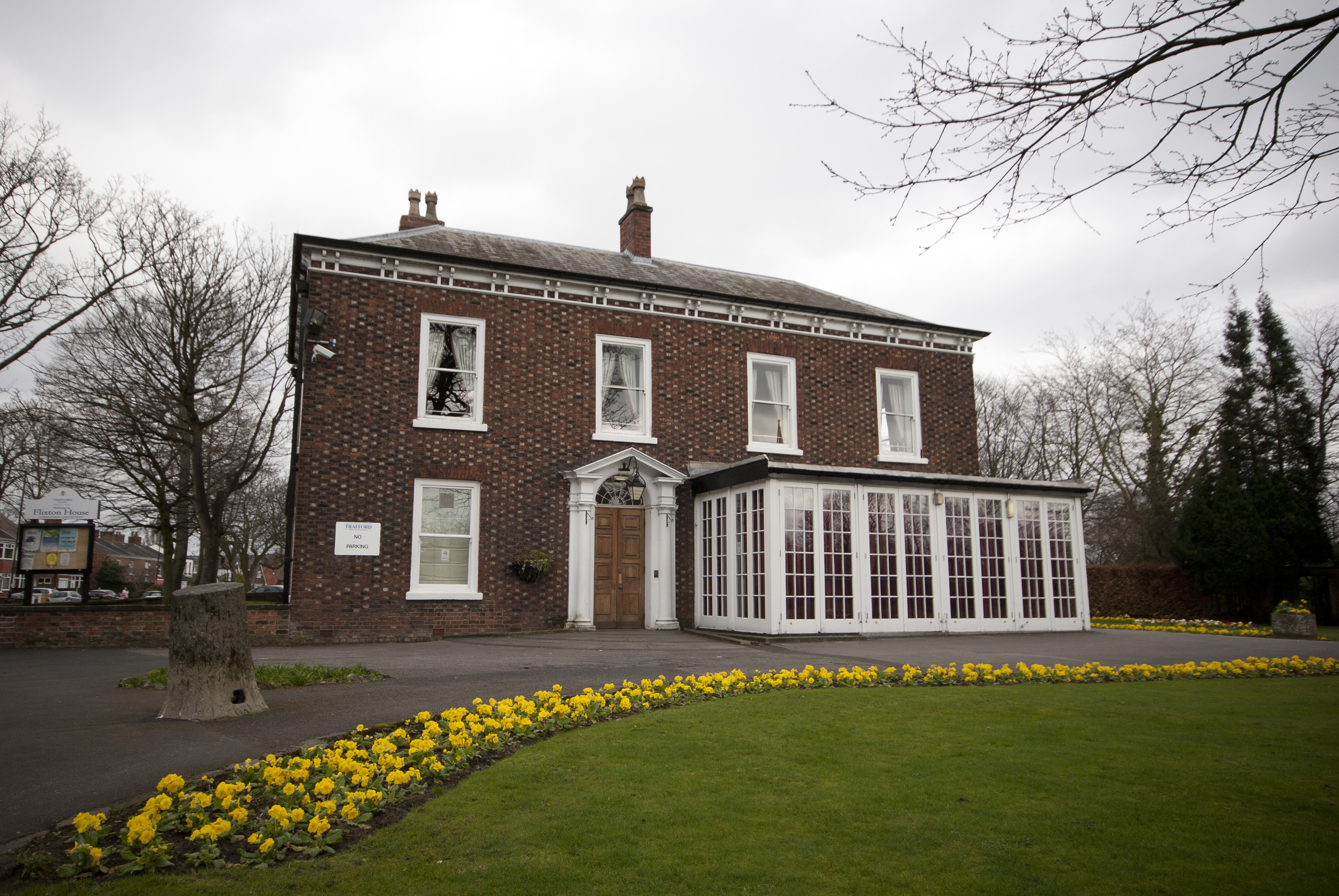
- Flixton House

- Location within Greater Manchester
- Population: 10,786 (2011)
- OS grid reference: SJ755945
- Metropolitan borough: Trafford
- Metropolitan county: Greater Manchester
- Region: North West
- Country: England
- Sovereign state: United Kingdom
- Post town: MANCHESTER
- Postcode district: M41
- Dialling code: 0161
- Police: Greater Manchester
- Fire: Greater Manchester
- Ambulance: North West
- UK Parliament: Stretford and Urmston

Flixton is a suburb and electoral ward in the Metropolitan Borough of Trafford, Greater Manchester, England. The population of the ward at the 2011 census was 10,786. It lies six miles (9.7 km) southwest of Manchester city centre, in the historic county of Lancashire.

Neolithic and Bronze Age artefacts have been found locally and the area may have been inhabited then. Medieval Flixton was a parish within the Hundred of Salford and manor of Flixton, first mentioned in the 12th century. The parish comprised isolated farmsteads and a manor house. Toward the end of the 17th century, its population began to rise, continuing through the 19th century, although at a much slower pace than its neighbours. Flixton was a remote rural area with few transport links and did not witness the level of industrialisation other parts of Manchester saw, but its connection to the railway network in 1873 helped transform the area into a middle-class suburb.

Flixton is represented in Parliament by Labour MP Andrew Western.

== Toponymy ==
Flixton has been recorded as fflixton, Fluxton, Flyxton, Flyxeton, Fleece-town, Flixston and Flixtone. It is not mentioned in the Domesday Survey, and first appears in historical records in 1176 or 1177. The name may be Scandinavian in origin, the Anglo-Saxon ton meaning a farmstead, although along with nearby Urmston, it may be an anglicised personal name from the 10th or 11th centuries and not a primary settlement name from earlier times.

== History ==
=== Early history ===
The area may have been inhabited during the Neolithic and Bronze Ages. Stone axes have been found on the banks of the River Mersey in Flixton, as well as on the banks of the River Irwell in Old Trafford. Further afield, two Neolithic arrowheads have been found in Altrincham and Dunham Massey, and a Bronze Age arrowhead in Warburton.

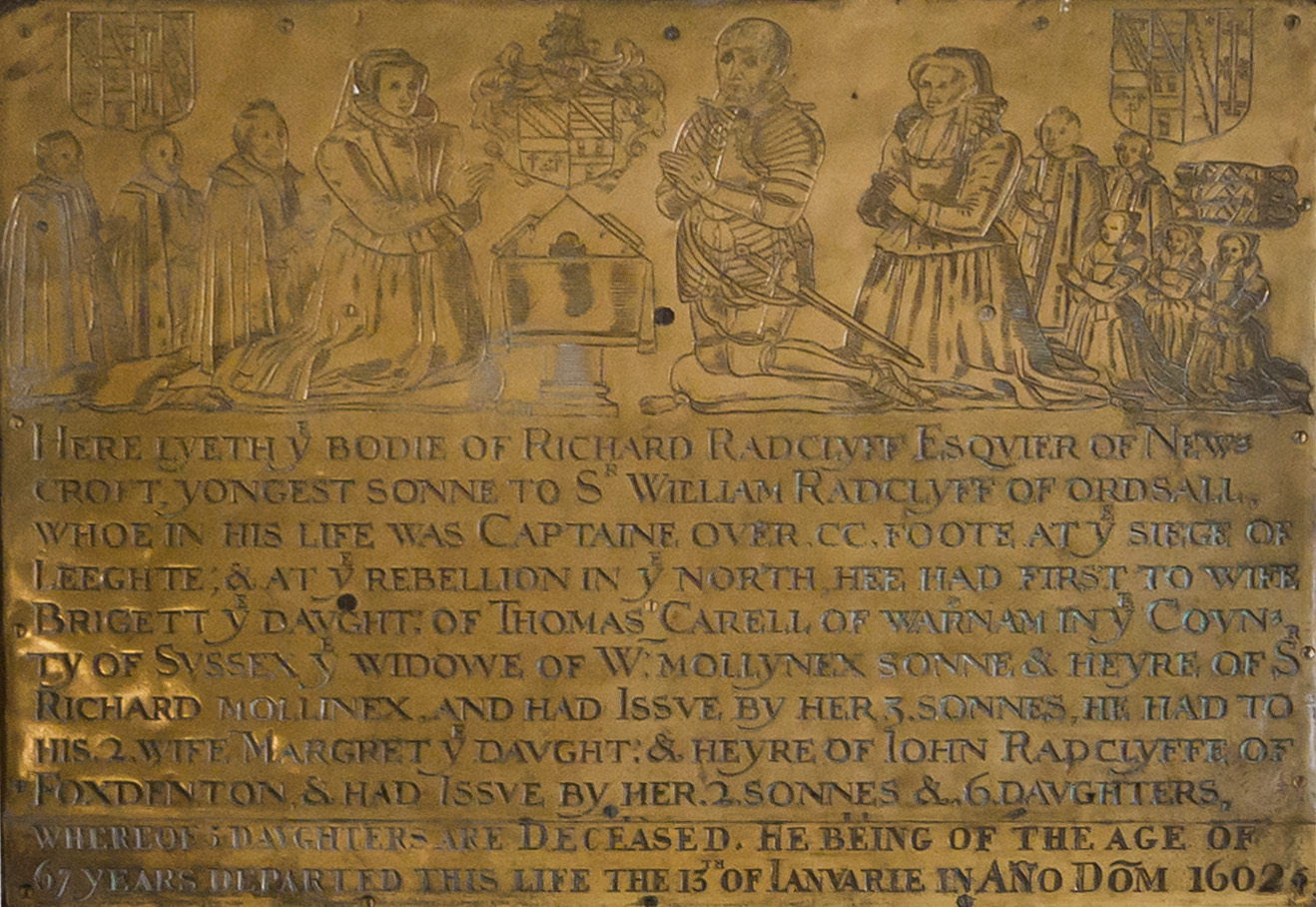
The Radclyff Brass, now in St Michael's Church. Richard Radclyff lived at Newcroft Hall in nearby Urmston.

Medieval Flixton was one of several parishes which existed in the Hundred of Salford. The parish encompassed the manors of Urmston and Flixton; the latter is first mentioned between 1189 and 1181 and was granted by the Mascy family of Dunham. The manor of Flixton's boundaries are unclear, although they were perhaps formed by a mixture of natural and man-made features including Carr Ditch, which divided Flixton and Urmston. St Michael's Church is also first recorded at about the same time, although the building may date from an earlier period. In keeping with a pattern found in northern and eastern Cheshire and south-eastern Lancashire, the parish comprised isolated farmsteads and a medieval manor house, rather than a village centre. Notable place names in medieval Flixton include Shaw Hall, located near the present-day Roebuck Hotel, east of the modern Flixton village. The location of Berne is unknown, while Booths was possibly somewhere near Hulme Bridge Farm, close to the Irwell. An area named Wood may have existed in the north-western part of Flixton, near a Woods-end Farm noted in an 1818 survey. A Shaw Hall, whose name first appears in 1508 and was derived from a small wood, was described by historian Michael Nevell as "the most significant medieval estate within the township". Reputed to be a Jacobean era mansion, it was referred to as a manor in 1594, although whether this was also the case during the medieval period is unknown. It was the home of the Valentines, the Asshawes and the Egertons, and during the English Civil War was defended against a potential attack by Royalist forces. The Egertons remained at Shaw Hall until 1757; thereafter it was occupied by various families, until it was demolished in the 20th century.

An early mention of Flixton appears in the Testa de Nevil, which includes the entry: "Albert Gredle, sen., gave to Henry, son of Siward, one carucate of land in Flixton by 10s. yearly. The heirs hold that land." The manor of Flixton was, for a time, controlled by the Grelleys, Barons of Manchester. Robert of Lathom, who inherited the manor, granted the parish of Flixton to the newly created Burscough Priory, located near Ormskirk, in 1190. The Grelleys may not have been Flixton manor's only masters, as in 1250–1251 part of the area came into the possession of David de Hulton. The Hultons united what in the 12th century was a fragmented manor. In 1330 they sub-let one half of it to the Valentine family and the other to two branches of the Radcliffe family. The Valentines are included in the Exchequer Lay Subsidy Rolls of 1332, which show five tax payers in Flixton: Richard le Valentine, Henry de l'Wode, William de l'Berne, Richard son of Robert and John de Booth. The name Valentine also appears in Flixton's parish registers, which begin in 1570. Written on vellum and mostly in Latin, the first records 11 baptisms, 2 marriages and 7 burials. Christian names include Hamlet, Randle and Ralph. The registers show that surnames such as Gilbody, Valentine, Millatt and Low remained prevalent in the area well into the 19th century.

=== Industrial Revolution ===
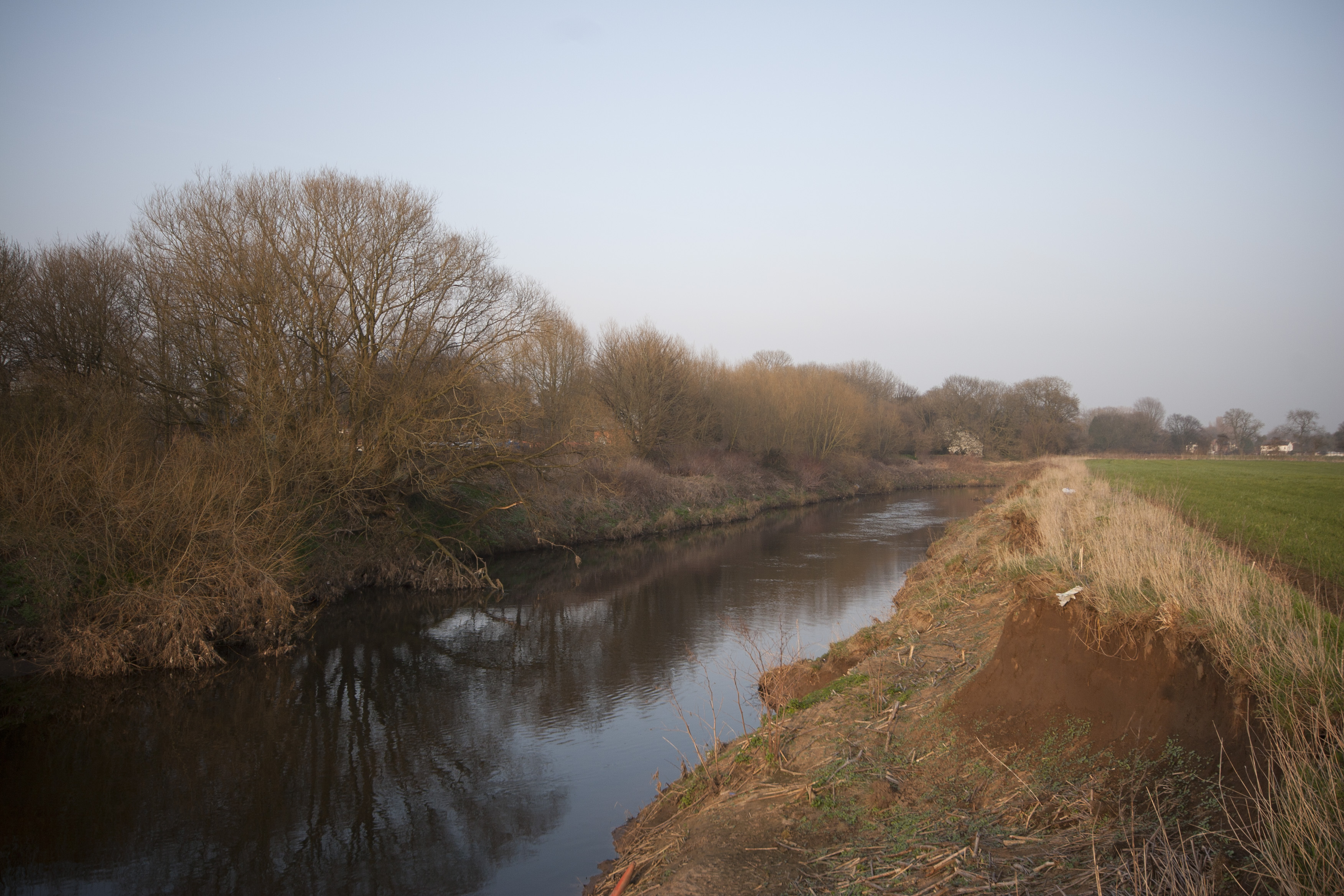
The River Mersey forms Flixton's southern border

Flixton's population remained fairly stable until the end of the 17th century, when, along with other nearby parishes, it began to rise steadily. It was by that time a small hamlet, with several buildings around the parish church and its parsonage. The 1664 hearth tax returns show that Flixton had 70 heads of household, who were likely engaged mainly in agricultural activities. Evidence exists to suggest that some areas in the parish were used for textile production, with "yarn croft" in Flixton, Stretford and Warburton indicating the production of flax. Almost 20 per cent of wills and other documents gathered from nearby areas contain references to textiles, hemp and flax.

Flixton played an important part in the early campaigns for public rights of way. The local squire, Ralph Wright, who lived at Flixton House, tried to close a footpath which crossed his land. This closure was opposed by local people with the support of Archibald Prentice of the Manchester Gazette, which lead to the creation of the "Manchester Association for the Preservation of Ancient Public Footpaths" in 1826. This evolved into the "Peak and Northern Footpath Society" which still exists today.

During the Industrial Revolution many of the townships in the region experienced fairly rapid population growth, although Flixton remained an exception, its population growing by only 22 per cent between 1801 and 1851. This was in stark contrast to Altrincham (165%), Bowdon (242%) and Stretford (238%), and is attributed to the emigration of villagers to more industrialised areas like Manchester, and the agricultural depression of the 1830s and 1840s. The domestic production of textiles, popular during the 17th and early 18th centuries in Flixton and other nearby townships, and the newer factory-based system which replaced it, had disappeared in Altrincham by the middle of the 19th century. Weaving continued in Flixton, although within ten years of the construction of Flixton Cotton Mills in 1851, domestic textile production had ended. In nearby Urmston, 28 per cent of the township's population was in 1851 engaged in textile work, but the area did not experience the level of industrialisation seen in towns like Ashton-under-Lyne, east of Manchester, where 16 mills were built between 1815 and 1829, doubling the population. The reasons for this reliance on land rather than industry are unclear.

Population growth in Flixton (Ancient Parish/Civil Parish) from 1801 to 1951
Year	1801	1811	1821	1831	1841	1851	1861	1871	1881	1891	1901	1911	1921	1931	1951
Population	1,625	1,982	2,249	2,099	2,230	2,064	2,050	1,512	1,776	2,786	3,656	4,845	5,411	8,523	14,678
Source: A Vision of Britain through Time

Flixton was a remote rural area with few transport links to nearby towns, the rivers Irwell and Mersey for the most part cutting off access to other areas. To the southwest, Carrington Old Bridge, removed in about 1840, was an old wooden structure too narrow to accommodate carts, which were forced to use a nearby ford. Another ford existed near Flixton Church and yet another near Shaw Hall. An omnibus service carried passengers to and from Stretford, where the nearest railway station was located, but it was the town's connection on 2 September 1873 to the UK's railway network, through the Manchester, Sheffield and Lincolnshire Railway (later the Cheshire Lines Committee) line from Manchester to Liverpool, which helped transform the area. A new bridge across the Mersey was built around 1906–1907, replacing the earlier structure nearer to Carrington. Flixton gradually became a middle-class railway suburb of Manchester.

== Governance ==
=== Civic history ===
In 1841 Davyhulme, Flixton and Urmston became part of the Chorlton Poor Law Union, until 1849 when, with Stretford, it was transferred to Barton upon Irwell Poor Law Union. An 1894 Act of Parliament created urban and rural district councils, and along with Carrington, Davyhulme, Dunham Massey, Hale, Partington, Timperley and Warburton, Flixton became part of Barton upon Irwell Rural District (Urmston gained an urban district council). Land was exchanged between Flixton and Irlam Urban District and Barton Moss civil parish. A further exchange of land occurred in 1920, with Carrington civil parish. In 1933 the civil parish became a part of Urmston Urban District. In 1951 the parish had a population of 14,678. On 1 April 1974 the parish was abolished.

=== Political representation ===
From 1918 to 1950 Flixton was a part of the Stretford Division of Lancashire and from 1950 to 1983 a part of the borough constituency of Stretford. From 1983 to 1997 it was included in the new constituency of Davyhulme and represented by the Conservative Party MP Winston Spencer-Churchill, grandson of Winston Churchill. The Davyhulme constituency was replaced in 1997 by Stretford and Urmston, whose first MP was Labour's Beverley Hughes. She won the 1997 General Election with 58.5 per cent of the vote, against the Conservatives' John Gregory with 30.5 per cent. She was replaced in 2010 by Kate Green, who won 48.6 per cent of the vote, compared to the Conservatives' Alex Williams with 28.7 per cent. The Liberal Democrats gained 16.9 per cent of the vote. In 2022, Green resigned after being nominated deputy mayor of Greater Manchester; her successor was Andrew Western, who won the by-election with a majority of 9,906, representing a swing of 11% from the Conservatives.

Flixton elects three councillors to Trafford Council; as of the 2019 local election, two seats are held by the Labour Party and one by the Conservative Party.

== Geography ==
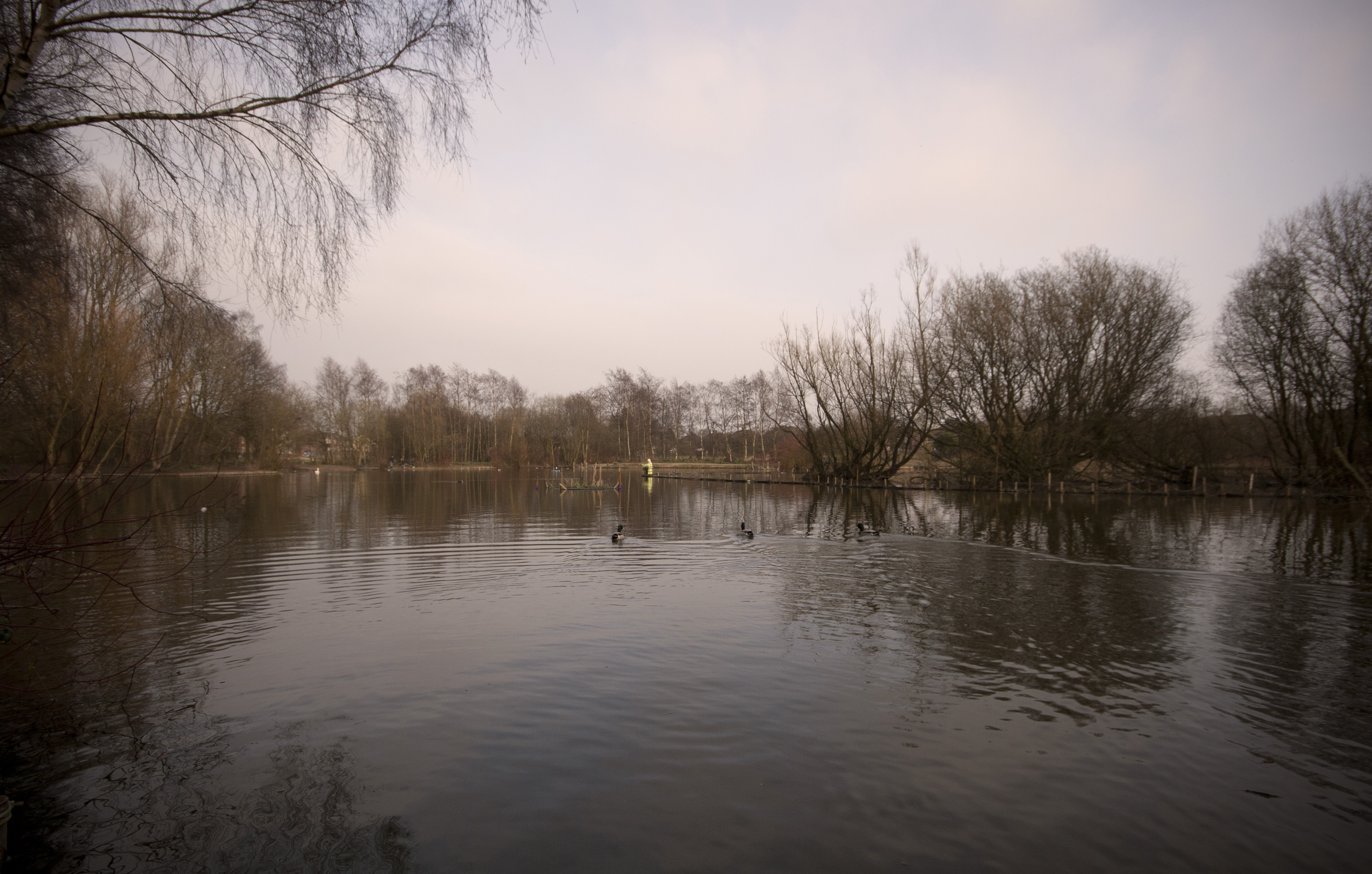
Dutton's Pond

At 53°44′27″N 2°38′44″W (53.4427°, −2.3844°) and 170 miles (274 km) northwest of central London, Flixton is located between Urmston and Irlam, which lie to the east and west. For the purposes of the Office for National Statistics, Flixton forms a south westerly part of the Greater Manchester Urban Area, with Manchester city centre 6.4 miles (10.3 km) to the north-northeast.

Flixton ward's southern boundary is formed by the River Mersey, opposite the neighbouring ward of Bucklow St Martins. With the creation of the Manchester Ship Canal, which roughly followed the former path of the River Irwell, the township's western boundary with Irlam was adopted in 1896. Today, the ward's western boundary lies further east, running south from farmland near Woodsend Circle to the Mersey Wier by Irlam Railway Viaduct. Flixton's north and eastern boundaries are formed by Moorside Road and the area slightly east of Chassen Road railway station. Most of the town's population lives to the north, the south being mainly open land.

== Demography ==
As of the United Kingdom Census 2001, Flixton ward's population was 9,473, 9,164 of whom were white, the remainder being either of mixed race, Asian, Black or Chinese. 3,789 people are listed as single and 3,543 as married for the first time; the remainder were either remarried, separated, divorced or widowed. 7,771 people considered themselves Christian, 952 stated they had no religion and 606 did not state their religion. 86 people are listed as Muslims, 22 as Hindus, 10 as Buddhist and 8 as Jewish.

Of Flixton's 4,530 households 83.1 per cent are listed as owner occupied. Most houses in the area are semi-detached; the rest are detached, terraced or flats. Average household income for 2010 was £39,231. According to the 2001 census, of the 6,812 people aged 16–74, 46.1 per cent were employed on a full-time basis, 11.2 per cent part-time, and 7.3 per cent self-employed. 1.8 per cent were unemployed and seeking work, while 16.5 per cent were retired.

== Culture ==
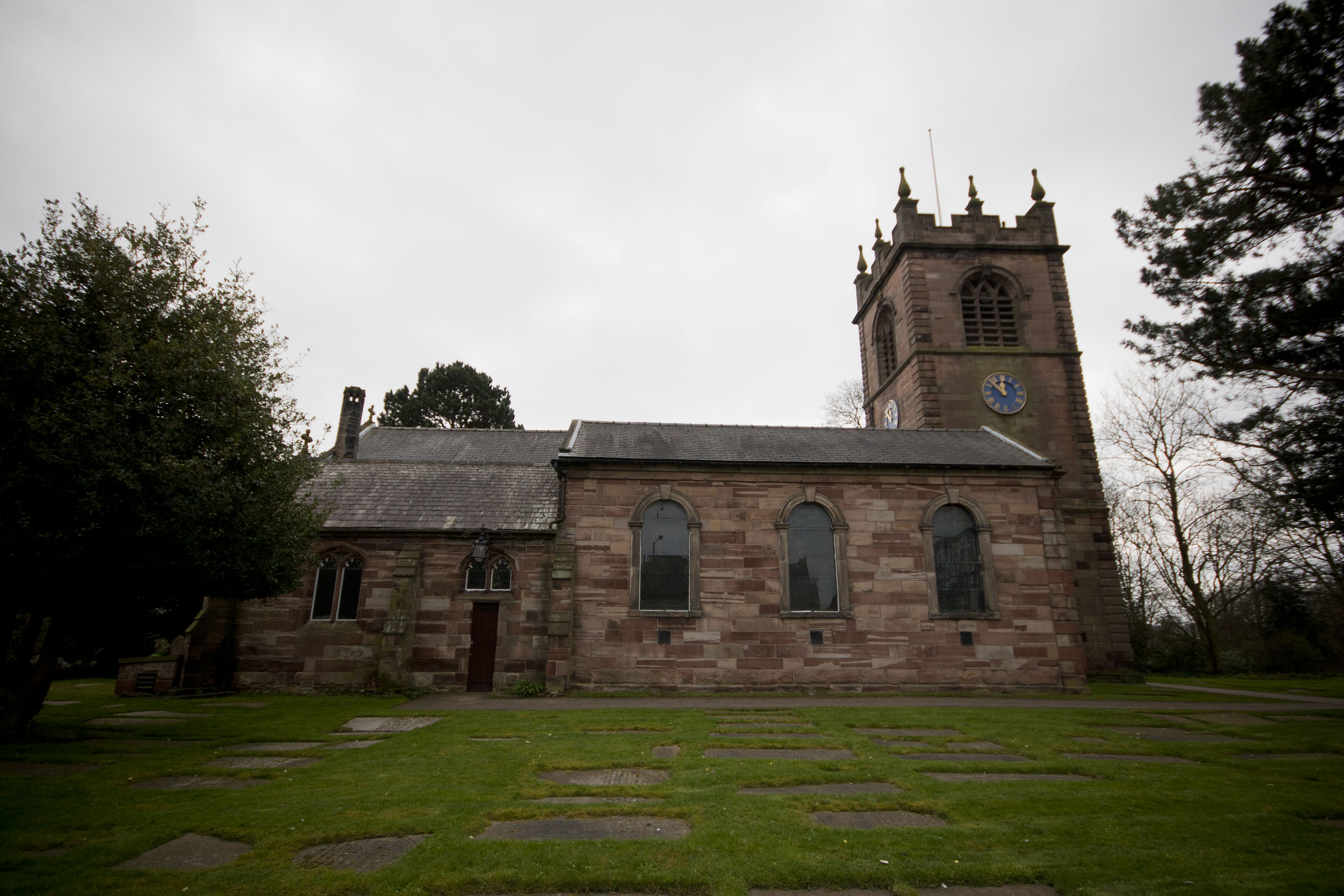
St Michaels Church in Flixton Village

Flixton Band, formed in 1877, played at the official opening of the Manchester Ship Canal in 1894, attended by Queen Victoria. It was disbanded in 1933 but reformed in 1967, since when it has performed on television and radio.

Local artist Frances Lennon, born in nearby Stretford, moved with her husband to Flixton in the late 1970s. Following his death she became a full-time painter, releasing several books including A Trafford Childhood (1986) and A Manchester Childhood (2001). Dubbed "the people's artist", she was the official artist for the 2002 Commonwealth Games and produced a special book of paintings relating to games and sports. In 2003, Lennon was awarded an MBE by Prince Charles for her contribution to arts and charity.

=== Religion ===
Flixton is in the Church of England Diocese of Manchester and the Roman Catholic Diocese of Salford. Historically church life has centred around the Grade II* listed 12th-century St Michaels Church, built on raised land close to the centre of Flixton village. For about 500 years the church was attached to Lichfield Cathedral. Another Church of England place of worship, St John's Church, can be found on Irlam Road. Flixton's Catholic Community worships at St Monica's Church on Woodsend Road South. The parish was founded in 1950 and the church built from 1968 to 1969.

== Landmarks ==
Flixton House, a late 18th-century Grade II listed building set in Flixton Park and Gardens, was the focus of one of the first footpath battles in England after its owner, Ralph Wright, in 1824 closed several footpaths crossing his estate. Local residents accepted the closures, but Wright also attempted to change the route of footpaths not on his land, ploughing the entrance to one and sowing it with oats. A local farmer, Samuel Wood, objected to Wright's tactics and removed each obstruction, restoring the footpath. Wright successfully gained an order supporting his changes at his third attempt, but by then the case had attracted considerable interest and in 1826 the Manchester Society for the Preservation of Ancient Footpaths was formed. After several years of expensive legal wrangling, Wright's order was quashed and in June 1827 the footpaths affected were reopened. Wright obtained further orders and again closed the footpaths, before the matter was finally resolved at the Quarter Session on 29 October that year, to Wright's cost. His loss proved to be an important event in the movement for footpath preservation in England.

Abbotsfield Park was the venue for a 1963 Beatles concert, booked before they became famous. The Urmston and District Model Engineering Society operates a miniature railway around the park and ran a yearly May Day Steam rally in conjunction with the Lancashire Traction Engine Club until 2010. Stocks, once located in Flixton village and seldom used, were removed in 1823. A tree planted in 1887 to celebrate Queen Victoria's Golden Jubilee, and known locally as 'The Jubilee Tree', now stands in the same area.

To the southwest lies Green Hill, from which the disused Flixton Sewage Works may be viewed. Formed from pulverised fuel ash, the soil provides ideal conditions for flora like gorse and is a habitat for moles. The former sewage works is an important undisturbed wintering site for wildfowl, such as marsh harriers and linnets. Nearby, Duttons Pond is a privately run but publicly accessible location for anglers. West of Dutton's Pond is Jack Lane Nature Reserve, a small marshland habitat for wetland birds, surrounded by farmland.

The Manchester Ship Canal forms a major landmark along Flixton's western border, with features including Irlam Locks, Hulmes Ferry, and the Mersey Wier, where the river Mersey empties into the canal.

== Transport ==
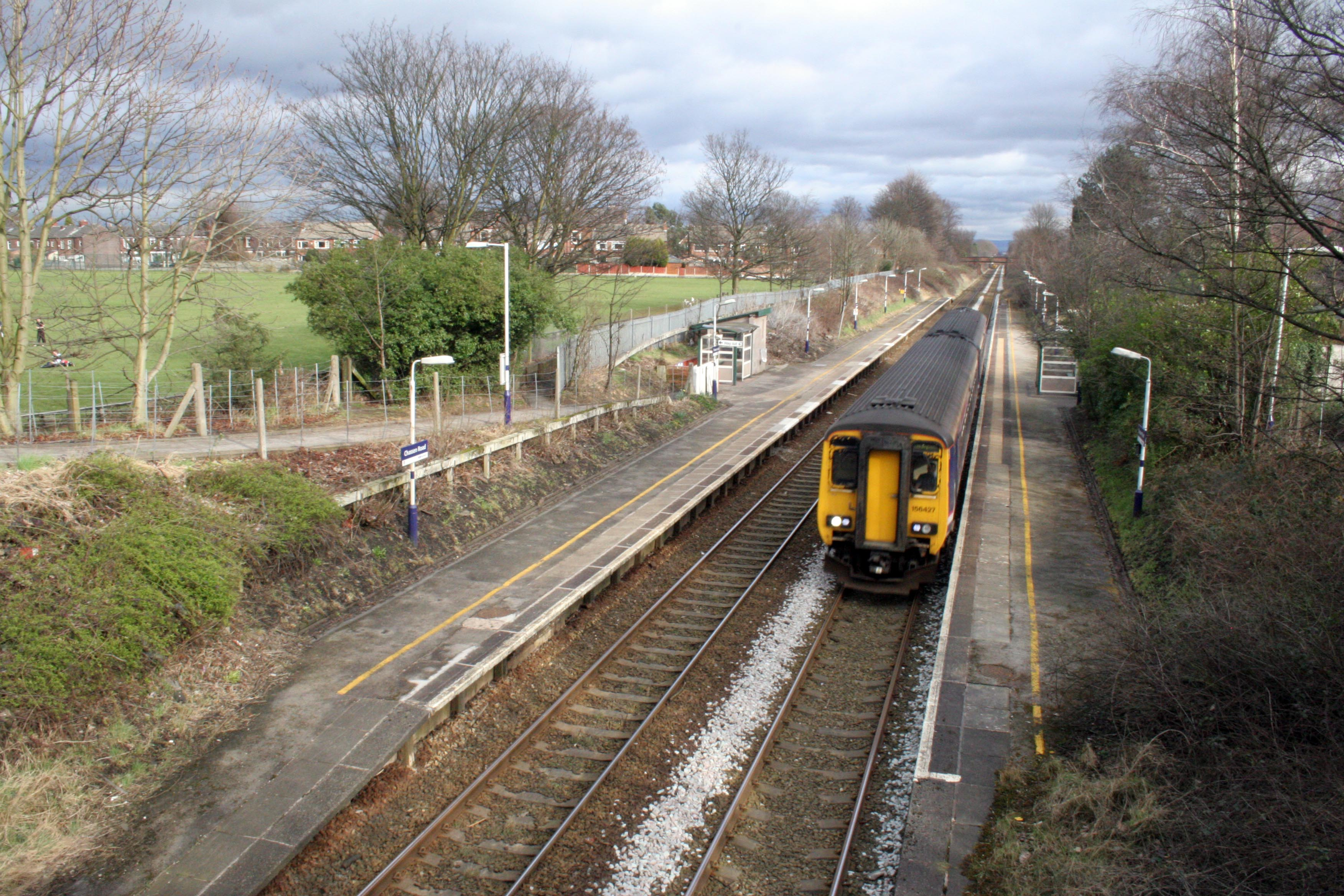
Chassen Road railway station

Public transport in Flixton is coordinated by Transport for Greater Manchester.

=== Rail ===
The village is served by two local railway stations, Flixton and Chassen Road, both managed by Northern.

=== Bus ===
Bus services in Flixton run to destinations such as Davyhulme, Urmston, Stretford, Partington, Hulme and Manchester.

== Education ==
Flixton has several primary and secondary schools. Its first was founded by Peter Egerton, in 1643, and built close to the parish church. The building was later replaced by the Dog and Partridge Inn, but another school was opened near the present-day Roebuck pub in 1662, of thatched wood and plaster. Shawtown school, which was slightly closer to Urmston than the building it replaced, was still extant in 1826, but was later used as cottages. A school built in 1861 opposite the parish church and expanded in 1893 has since been demolished.

Flixton Girls' School is a non-selective sports specialist academy school, for girls aged 11–16. Its 2011 Ofsted report describes it as a good school, with "a number of outstanding features including the way in which the school promotes community cohesion". Another local school, Wellacre Academy, was described by Ofsted as "an outstanding and happy school which knows itself very well".

School	Description	Ofsted	Website
Acre Hall Primary	Primary school	133642	
Flixton Primary School	Primary school	106318	website
St Michael's C.E. Primary School	Primary school	106350	website
St Monica's R.C. Primary School	Primary school	106356	website
Flixton Girls' School	Secondary school	106364	website
Wellacre Academy	Secondary school	106366	website
Delamere Special School	Special school	106394	

== Sport ==
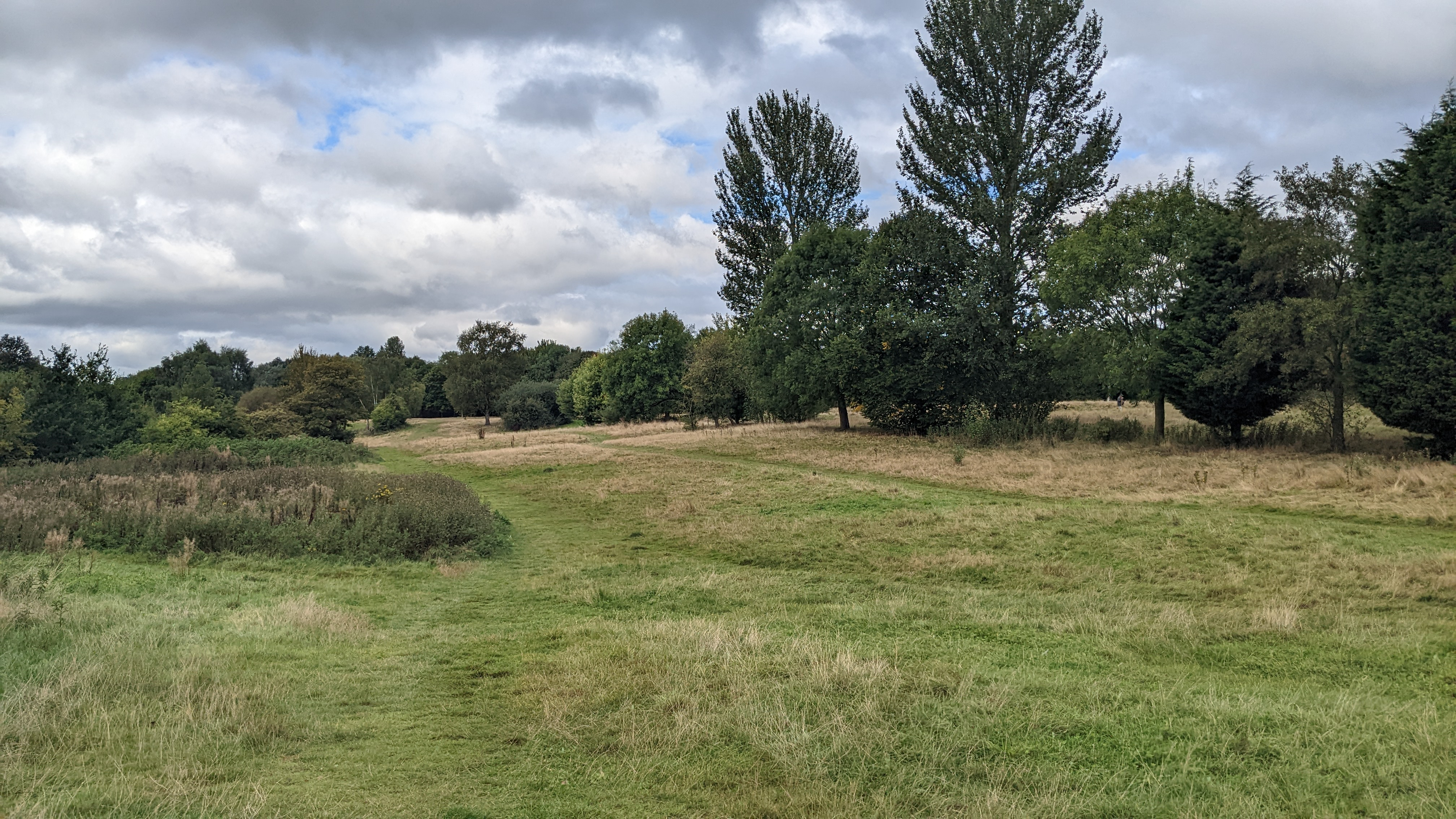
The former William Wroe Golf Course in 2022

Flixton was witness to bull and bear baiting, performed in several places throughout the village. One of these was in Shawtown, on "Schoo' Green", and another was at "Th' Grane", at the top of Woodsend Road, opposite where the Red Lion pub once stood. The practice was ended in 1816. Badger baiting was also practised, at certain inns. Anecdotal evidence exists to suggest that hunting, cockfighting and horse racing took place in Flixton, the latter in the fields around the parish church.

Formed in 1990, Trafford Football Club plays in the Northern Premier League. Local golf courses include the privately owned Flixton Golf Club. The William Wroe course, named after Councillor William Wroe, was opened in 1973 as a fourteen-hole course, six holes occupying land on the Flixton road side of the railway, and eight on the Church road side. The land it occupies was originally purchased by Urmston District Council in 1935, but from 1947 to 1970, aware that it was gradually becoming occupied, Wroe campaigned for the establishment of a municipal golf course. It was expanded to fifteen holes, then eventually to eighteen holes in 1984, after the nearby Acre Gate Farm became vacant. The course was closed at the end of March 2017 due to council cutbacks. The former golf course was given Fields in Trust status in 2023.

== See also ==
- Listed buildings in Urmston
