= Flixton Girls' School =

Location
- Flixton Road; Flixton, Greater Manchester, M41 5DR; England; 53.4493°N 2.3710°W

Information
- Type: Academy
- Established: 1933
- Department for Education URN: 136965 Tables
- Headmistress: Dorothy Trussell
- Gender: Girls
- Age: 11 to 18
- Colours: Red, white, grey & black
- Website: http://www.flixtongirls.com/

Flixton Girls' School (formerly Flixton Girls' High School) is a secondary school with academy status, located in the Flixton area of the borough of Trafford, Greater Manchester, England.

The school first opened in 1933 and converted to academy status in 2011. The school now admits girls of all abilities.

Flixton Girls' School opened a new, female only, sixth form in September 2013, in partnership with Trafford College. Girls in the sixth form have the option to study from a range of A-levels and BTECs.

== Notable alumni ==
- Yasmin Lauryn, member of Four of Diamonds
- Stephanie Waring, actress (Hollyoaks)
