= List of parishes in the Diocese of Salford =

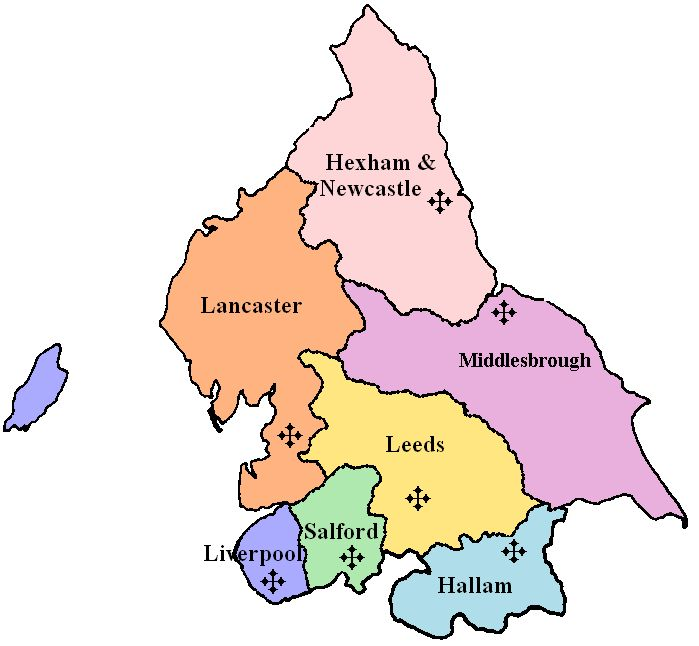
The Diocese of Salford shown within the Ecclesiastical Province of Liverpool

This list compiles the entirety of the parishes within the Roman Catholic Diocese of Salford, located in the north of England.

The list of parishes are each divided by their local authority.

== Borough of Blackburn with Darwen ==
Parish	Locality	Parish Priest	Founded	Closed	Ref.
Holy Souls	Brownhill	Served from St Alban's	1924	----	
Sacred Heart	Blackburn	James McCartney	1900	----	
St Mary	Islington	----	1859	1987	
Our Lady of the Assumption	Little Harwood	----	1957	1985	
St Alban	Larkhill, Blackburn	Jude Harrison	1773	----	
The Good Shepherd	Blackburn	Served from St Alban	1968	----	
St Anne	Blackburn	Served from the Sacred Heart	1849	----	
Holy Family	Audley, Intack and Shadsworth	Ged Barry		----	
St Joseph	Audley	Served from Holy Family	1869	----	
St Mary	Osbaldeston		1832	----	
St Jerome	Mellor	----	1970	1992	
St Teresa of the Child Jesus	Intack	Served from Holy Family	1937	----	
St John Vianney	Livesey	Served from St Peter's	1959	----	
Our Lady of Perpetual Succour	Longshaw	Served from Holy Family	1955	----	
St Peter in Chains	Mill Hill	Anthony Dutton	1889	----	
SS Mary & John (Pleasington Priory)	Pleasington	J Kevin Kenny	1819	----	
St Paul (Chapel of Ease)	Feniscowles	Served from Priory		----	
Christ the King & St Antony of Padua	Shadsworth	----	1959	2008	
Sacred Heart & St Edward	Darwen	Served from St Joseph's	1878	----	
St Joseph (Previously St William)	Darwen	Peter Wilkinson	1856	----	

== Borough of Bolton ==
Parish	Locality	Parish Priest	Founded	Closed	Ref.
St Edmund	Bolton	Gerry Haugh	1860	----	
St Patrick	Bolton	Served from St Edmund	1861	----	
Ss Peter & Paul	Bolton	----	1794	2009	
The Good Shepherd (Polish)	Bolton	Andrzej Marcak		----	
St Mary of the Assumption	Bolton	----	1845	1987	
The Holy Infant & St Anthony	Astley Bridge	William Molloy	1877	----	
St Osmund	Breightmet	Geoffrey Hilton	1921	----	
St Andrew	Breightmet	----	1959	1998	
St John the Evangelist	Bromley Cross	Michael Cooke	1960	----	
St Ethelbert	Deane	Duncan McVicar	1905	----	
St William of York	Great Lever	Morrough O'Brien	1936	----	
St Joseph	Halliwell	Served from St James the Great	1879	----	
St Brendan	Harwood	Served from St John, Bromley Cross	1971	----	
St Thomas of Canterbury	Heaton	William Byrne	1958	----	
St James the Great	Montserrat	Patrick Tansey	1954	----	
St Vincent de Paul	Over Hulton	Served from St Ethelbert	1972	----	
St Columba	Tonge Moor		1931	2017	
Our Lady of Lourdes	Farnworth	John Dale	1931	----	
St Gregory the Great	Farnworth	Served from Our Lady of Lourdes	1853	----	
St Mary (previously Our Lady of the Rosary)	Horwich	Barry O'Sullivan	1886	----	
St Antony	Horwich	----	1906	2012	
St John Fisher	Kearsley	David Musgrave	1960	----	
St Teresa	Little Lever	Served from St Mary, Radcliffe	1963	----	
St Aldhelm (also Edgeworth)	Turton	Founded at Thomasons Fold, independent from 1902, served from St John, Bromley Cross from 1968 - 1992	1890	1992	
Sacred Heart of Jesus	Westhoughton	Richard Aspden	1873	----	

== Borough of Burnley ==
Parish	Locality	Parish Priest	Founded	Closed	Ref.
Christ the King	Burnley	Brian Kealey	1928	----	
St Teresa of the Infant Jesus	Burnley	Served from Christ the King		----	
St John the Baptist	Burnley	Michael Waters	1891	----	
St Mary of the Assumption	Burnley	Peter Hopkinson (Dean)	1817	----	
St Mary Magdalene	Burnley	Michael Haworth	1887	----	
St Augustine	Lowerhouse	Served from St Mary Magdalene	1896	----	
St Philip the Apostle	Padiham		1953	2017	
St John the Baptist	Padiham	Peter Hopkinson	1864	----	
Towneley Chapel	Burnley	----	1706	1872	

== Borough of Bury ==
Parish	Locality	Parish Priest	Founded	Closed	Ref.
Our Lady Queen of Poland (Polish)	Bury	Dariusz Kuwaczka		----	
St Joseph	Bury	Francis Wadsworth	1861	----	
St Marie	Bury	Francis Wadsworth	1825	----	
Our Lady of Good Counsel & Guardian Angels	Elton	Paul Cannon	1886	----	
St Bede	Fairfield	----	1950	2003	
St Joseph	Ramsbottom	John Sullivan	1862	----	
Our Lady of Grace	Prestwich	John Francis Allen	1889	----	
St Mary & St Philip Neri	Radcliffe	James Manock (Liturgical Formation)	1863	----	
St Bernadette	Whitefield	Christopher Lough	1952	----	
St Michael	Whitefield	Served from St Bernadette's	1967	----	
St Hilda	Tottington	Christopher McGrane	1916	----	

== Borough of Calderdale ==
Parish	Locality	Parish Priest	Founded	Closed	Ref.
St Joseph	Todmorden	Seamus Quigley	1868	----	

== Borough of Hyndburn ==
Parish	Locality	Parish Priest	Founded	Closed	Ref.
St Oswald / Sacred Heart	Accrington	----	1852	2003	
St Anne	Accrington	Simon Stamp	1897	----	
St Joseph	Accrington	Paul Blackburn	1949	----	
Our Lady's Chapel	Huncoat	Served from St Joseph	1949	----	
St Mary	Clayton-le-Moors	Peter Tierney	1819	----	
Our Lady & St Hubert	Great Harwood	Served from St Wulstan	1859	----	
St Wulstan	Great Harwood	J Anthony Clarke	1912	----	
St Charles Borromeo	Rishton	Martin C Dowd	1886	----	

== City of Manchester ==
Parish	Locality	Parish Priest	Founded	Closed	Ref.
St Mary (The Hidden Gem)	Manchester City Centre	Anthony Kay	1794	----	
Catholic Chaplaincy Centre	Manchester University			----	
St Augustine (Parish and University Chaplaincy)	All Saints		1820	----	
St Alban	Ancoats	----	1863	1968	
St Joseph	Goulden Street	----	1852	1904	
St William	Angel Meadow	----	1864	1946	
St Anne	Ancoats		1848	----	
St Michael	Ancoats	----	1859	2003	
Our Lady of Mount Carmel	Blackley	Philip Brady	1885	----	
St John Bosco	Blackley	Served from Mount Carmel	1940	----	
St Brigid	Bradford	Served from St Anne, Ancoats	1879	----	
St Bernard	Burnage	Michael Kujacz	1941	----	
St Chad's	Cheetham		1773	----	
Dormition of our Lady (Ukrainian Catholic Church)	Cheetham	Jaroslaw Rij		----	
Our Lady & St John (St John's)	Chorlton-cum-Hardy	Patrick McMahon	1892	----	
St Ambrose of Milan	Chorlton-cum-Hardy	William Foley	1932	----	
Church of the Holy Name of Jesus	Chorlton-on-Medlock		1868	----	
St Willibrord	Clayton	Michael Job	1906	----	
St Patrick	Collyhurst	Gerald Murphy	1832	----	
St Casimir	Collyhurst	----	1904	1931	
St Malachy	Collyhurst	Served from St Patrick's, Collyhurst	1922	----	
St Anne	Crumpsall	David Glover	1917	----	
St Catherine of Sienna	Didsbury	Bernard Wilson	1928	----	
Sacred Heart	Gorton		1901	----	
St Francis of Assisi (Gorton Monastery)	Gorton	Served from Sacred Heart, Gorton	1861	----	
St Clare	Higher Blackley	David Young	1929	----	
St Wilfrid	Hulme	----	1842	2003	
St Kentigern	Fallowfield	Thomas A. Connolly	1926	----	
St Joseph	Longsight	Ian Farrell	1888	----	
St Richard	Longsight	Michael Dever	1936	----	
St Robert	Longsight	----	1915	2003	
Corpus Christi	Miles Platting	----	1889	2007	
St Edmund of Canterbury	Miles Platting	----	1871	2007	
Church of Divine Mercy (Polish)	Moss Side	Andrzej Zuziak (Provincial and Parish Priest); Artur Stelmach; Pawel Urbanek	1961	----	
Our Lady	Moss Side	Patrick Deegan	1949	----	
St Dunstan	Moston	David Featherstone (Vocations Director)	1912-13	----	
St John Vianney	Moston	Served from St Dunstan	1968	----	
St Margaret Mary	New Moston	Served from St Dunstan	1935	----	
Christ the King	Newton Heath	Alan Denneny	1937	----	
St Anne	Higher Openshaw	James Clarke	1849	----	
St Vincent de Paul	Openshaw		1896	2006	
St Mary of the Angels & St Clare	Levenshulme	Served from St Richard	1853	----	
St Edward the Confessor	Rusholme	Served from St Kentigern's, Fallowfield	1860	----	
The English Martyrs	Whalley Range	Geoffrey Marlor	1876	----	
St Bernadette	Withington	Served from St Cuthbert's, Withington	1958	----	
St Cuthbert	Withington	Brendan Curley	1874	----	

== Borough of Oldham ==
Parish	Locality	Parish Priest	Founded	Closed	Ref.
St Mary	Oldham	Now closed	1828	----	
Our Lady of Mount Carmel and St Patrick Church	Oldham	Philip T Sumner	1858	----	
All Saints & SS Peter & Paul (Ukrainian Catholic Church)	Oldham	Bohdan-Benjamin Lysykanych		----	
St Michael	Abbeyhills	Served from St Anne, Greenacres	1948	----	
Sacred Heart of Jesus	Derker Now Closed	Served from Our Lady's, Moorside	1952	----	
Holy Rosary	Fitton Hill	William Molloy	1952	----	
St Anne	Greenacres	Derek Woodhead	1878	----	
Our Lady	Moorside	Derek Woodhead	1958	----	
St Joseph	Shaw	John B Scanlon	1874	----	
SS Aidan & Oswald	Royton	Stephen J Doyle	1874	----	
St Herbert	Chadderton	Peter McKie	1916	----	
Holy Family	Hollinwood	William Molloy	1957	----	
Corpus Christi	Hollinwood	Dermot Heakin	1878	----	
St Marys (The Immaculate Conception)	Failsworth	Patrick John McKeown	1845	----	
St Edward	Lees		1872	----	

== Borough of Pendle ==
Parish	Locality	Parish Priest	Founded	Closed	Ref.
Holy Trinity	Brierfield	----	1895	2003	
Sacred Heart	Colne	Christopher Gorton	1871	----	
St Ursula	Cotton Tree	----	1912	2003	
Holy Saviour	Nelson	Served from Sacred Heart	1896	----	
St John Southworth	Nelson	Brian Murphy	1992	----	
Christ Church	Nelson	Served from St John Southworth	2004	----	
St Joseph	Nelson	----	1884	2004	
St George	Nelson	----	1900	1992	
SS Peter & Paul	Barrowford	Served from Sacred Heart	1897	----	

== Borough of Ribble Valley ==
Church	Locality	Rector	Founded	Closed	Ref.
St Mary	Chipping	Served from Longridge	1828	----	
St Michael & St John, Lowergate	Clitheroe	John Corcoran	1797	----	
St Hubert	Dunsop Bridge	Served from Clitheroe	1864	----	
St Mary (Our Lady Assumed into Heaven)	Langho	Leo Heakin	1836	----	
St Wilfrid	Longridge	David Chinnery	1869	----	
SS Peter & Paul	Ribchester	Served from Longridge	1789	----	
St Mary (Queen of Peace)	Sabden	Served from Clitheroe	1873	----	
English Martyrs	Whalley	Philip Price	1921	----	
St Peter (Stonyhurst College)	Stonyhurst	Tim Curtis	1832	----	
St Joseph (Chapel of Ease)	Hurst Green	Served from St Peter, Stonyhurst		----	

== Borough of Rochdale ==
Parish	Locality	Parish Priest	Founded	Closed	Ref.
Holy Family	Kirkholt		1954	----	
Sacred Heart	Newbold	David F O'Kane	1948	----	
St John the Baptist	Rochdale	Served from St Gabriel's	1830	----	
St Patrick	Rochdale	Joseph F Sweeney	1856	----	
St Vincent De Paul	Norden	Paul Brindle	1940	----	
Our Lady of Czestochowa & Maximilian Kolbe	Rochdale	Joseph Wozniak Schram		----	
St Gabriel & the Angels	Castleton	Michael Johonnett	1879	----	
St Peter	Middleton	Kieren Mullarkey	1867	----	
St Thomas More	Alkrington	Peter McGiveron	1960	----	
St Agnes & St John Fisher	Middleton	Served from Our Lady's, Langley	1966	----	
St Agnes	Middleton	----	1966	2003	
Our Lady of The Assumption	Langley	Tadgh Mullins	1953	----	
St Columba	Langley	----	1959	1992	
Our Lady & St Paul	Heywood		1963	2018	
Our Lady & St Joseph	Heywood	Paul Daly	1853	----	
St Mary of the Annunciation	Littleborough	Arthur C Nearey	1879	----	
Our Lady of Lourdes	Holts	----	1964	1991	

== Borough of Rossendale ==
Parish	Locality	Parish Priest	Founded	Closed	Ref.
St Mary	Bacup	Served from St Anselm	1852	----	
Our Immaculate Mother & St Anselm	Whitworth	Frank Thorpe	1860	----	
St Joseph	Stacksteads	----	1947	2005	
St Joseph & St Peter	Newchurch-In-Rossendale	Philip Boast	1915	----	
The Immaculate Conception	Haslingden	John Mackie	1854	----	
St Veronica (Chapel of Ease)	Helmshore	Served from The Immaculate Conception	1959	----	
St James the Less	Rawtenstall	Anthony McBride	1828	----	

== City of Salford ==
Parish	Locality	Parish Priest	Founded	Closed	Ref.
Cathedral Church of St John the Evangelist	Salford	Michael Jones	1848	----	
Our Lady of Delours	Kersal	Peter Conniffe	1923	----	
St Peter	Greengate	----	1863	1984	
Our Lady of Mount Carmel	Ordsall	----	1875	1978	
St Joseph	Ordsall	Served from the Cathedral	1871	2020	
St Thomas of Canterbury	Higher Broughton	David MacFarlane	1878	----	
St Philip Benizi	Lower Kersal	----	1927	2004	
St Boniface	Lower Broughton	Served from St Thomas of Canterbury	1895	2018	
Mother of God & St James	Pendleton	Shaun K Braiden	1875	----	
SS Peter & Paul	Pendleton	Anthony McBride	1956	----	
St Sebastian	Pendleton	Served from St Thomas of Canterbury	1892	----	
All Souls & St John Vianney	Weaste	----	1892	2010	
St Mark	Pendlebury	Barry Lomax	1923	----	
St Gilbert	Brookhouse, Peel Green	----	1959	2006	
St Mary	Eccles	Robert Livesey	1879	----	
Holy Cross	Patricroft	Martin Collins	1961	----	
St Joseph the Worker	Irlam	Lionel Devany	1963	----	
St Teresa of Avila	Irlam	Desmond O'Driscoll	1874	----	
Sacred Heart	Cadishead	Served from St Teresa	1962	----	
St Luke	Irlams o' th' Height	John Williams	1922	----	
St Edmund, King and Martyr	Little Hulton	Michael Buckley	1876	----	
Lancashire Martyrs	Little Hulton	Served from St Edmund	1959	----	
St Joseph	Little Hulton	----	1961	2010	
Christ The King	Walkden	Martin J Broadley	1952	----	
St Matthew	Winton	Served from The Holy Cross, Patricroft	1957	----	
St Charles	Swinton	Paul Smith	1923	----	
St Mary of the Immaculate Conception	Swinton	Served from St Mark, Pendlebury	1847	----	

== Borough of South Ribble ==
Parish	Locality	Parish Priest	Founded	Closed	Ref.
St Mary	Bamber Bridge	Terence Richardson	1780	----	
Our Lady of Lourdes & St Gerard Majella	Lostock Hall	Dom Xavier Ho	1891	----	
St Mary & St John Southworth	Samlesbury	served from Walton le Dale	1690	----	
Our Lady and St Patrick	Walton-le-Dale	Philip Nathaniel	1855	----	

== Borough of Stockport ==
Parish	Locality	Parish Priest	Founded	Closed	Ref.
Holy Family	Reddish	Christopher Dawson	1954	----	
St Joseph	Reddish	Maurice O'Connell	1882	----	
St Mary	Heaton Norris	Served from St Winifred	1867	----	
St Winifred	Heaton Mersey	Provost Michael R Quinlan	1911	----	

== Borough of Tameside ==
Parish	Locality	Parish Priest	Founded	Closed	Ref.
St Ann	Ashton-under-Lyne	Simon Firth	1852	----	
St Mary	Ashton-under-Lyne	----	1856	2002	
St Christopher	Hurst Cross	Served from St Anne, Ashton	1951	----	
St Paul	Guide Bridge	----	1962	2010	
St Mary (Our Lady of Sorrows)	Denton	Peter Kinsella	1869	----	
St Stephen	Droylsden	William Fallon	1935	----	
St John Fisher	Haughton Green	Served from St Mary, Denton	1965	----	
St Joseph	Mossley	Michael Lavin	1856	----	

== Borough of Trafford ==
Parish	Locality	Parish Priest	Founded	Closed	Ref.
St Monica	Flixton	Bernard Charnock	1950	----	
Our Lady of the Rosary	Davyhulme	----	1960	2010	
St Alphonsus	Old Trafford	Served from Our Lady's, Moss Side	1903	----	
English Martyrs	Urmston	David Featherstone	1891	----	
St Antony of Padua	Trafford Park		1904	2010	
St Ann's	Stretford	John P Hitchen	1859	----	
St Hugh of Lincoln	Stretford	Michael Cleary	1938	----	
St Teresa	Stretford		1928	2009	
All Saints Franciscan Friary	Urmston	Brendan Blundell	1798	----	

== Borough of Wigan ==
Parish	Locality	Parish Priest	Erected	Closed	Ref.
The Holy Family	New Springs, Wigan	Served from Our Lady, Haigh	1898	----	
Our Lady of the Immaculate Conception	Haigh	Kevin C Foulkes	1854	----	
St Andrew	Blackrod	----	1961	2012	

== Dedications ==
Italics indicates a closed church or a parish dedication.

- St Agnes (C4th): Boarshaw
- St Aidan (C7th): Royton
- St Alban (C3rd): Blackburn
- All Souls: Salford
- St Alphonsus (C18th): Old Trafford
- St Ambrose (C4th): Chorlton
- St Ambrose Barlow (C17th): Swinton
- St Andrew: Blackrod
- St Anne: Accrington, Ancoats, Ashton-under-Lyne, Blackburn, Crumpsall, Higher Openshaw, Stretford
- St Anselm (C12th): Whitworth
- St Anthony (C4th): Astley Bridge
- St Anthony of Padua (C13th): Stretford
- Holy Apostles: Rawtenstall
- St Augustine (C5th): All Saints, Burnley
- St Bernadette (C19th): Whitefield, Withington
- St Bernard (C12th): Burnage
- St Boniface (C8th): Salford
- St Brendan (C6th): Harwood
- St Brigid (C6th): Bradford
- St Catherine of Siena (C14th): Didsbury
- St Chad (C7th): Cheetham Hill
- St Charles (C17th): Moorside
- St Charles Borromeo (C16th): Rishton
- Christ Church: Nelson
- Christ the King: Burnley, Newton Heath, Walkden
- Christ the Redeemer: Bolton
- St Christopher (C3rd): Ashton-under-Lyne
- St Clare (C13th): Higher Blackley
- Corpus Christi: Bolton, Hollinwood
- Holy Cross: Ashton-under-Lyne, Patricroft
- St Cuthbert (C7th): Bolton, Withington
- Divine Mercy: Chadderton
- Blessed Dominic Barberi (C19th): Bolton
- St Dunstan (C10th): Moston
- St Edmund King & Martyr (C9th): Bolton, Little Hulton
- St Edward (C11th): Darwen, Lees, Rusholme
- The English Martyrs (C16th): Urmston, Whalley, Whalley Range
- St Ethelbert of Kent (C7th): Deane
- Holy Family: Blackburn, Denton, Kirkholt, Limeside, New Springs
- St Francis of Assisi (C13th): Gorton, Oldham
- St Gabriel: Castleton
- St Gerard Majella (C18th): Lostock Hall
- St Gilbert (C12th): Peel Green
- The Good Samaritan: Burnley
- St Gregory the Great (C6th): Farnworth
- St Helen (C4th): Ashton-under-Lyne
- St Herbert (C7th): Chadderton
- St Hubert of Liege (C8th): Dunsop Bridge, Great Harwood
- St Hugh of Lincoln (C12th): Stretford
- The Immaculate Conception: Failsworth, Haslingden
- The Holy Infant: Astley Bridge
- St James: Pendleton
- St James the Less: Rawtenstall
- St John the Baptist: Burnley, Padiham, Rochdale
- St John Bosco (C19th): Blackley
- St John the Evangelist: Bromley Cross, Chorlton-cum-Hardy, Clitheroe, Pleasington, Salford
- St John Fisher (C16th): Boarshaw, Denton, Kearsley
- St John Henry Newman (C19th): Urmston
- St John Paul II (C20th): Eccles, Padiham
- St John Southworth (C17th): Nelson, Samlesbury
- St John Vianney (C19th): Livesey, Moston
- St Joseph: Accrington, Audley, Bury, Darwen, Halliwell, Heywood, Hurst Green, Irlam, Longsight, Mossley, Ramsbottom, Reddish, Salford, Shaw, Todmorden
- St Kentigern (C6th): Fallowfield
- The Lancashire Martyrs: Little Hulton
- St Luke: Irlams-o'-th'-Height
- St Malachy (C12th): Collyhurst
- St Margaret Clitherow (C16th): Rochdale
- St Margaret Mary (C17th): New Moston
- St Mark: Pendlebury
- St Mary/Our Lady: Bacup, Bamber Bridge, Bury, Chipping, Chorlton-cum-Hardy, Clayton-le-Moors, Denton, Eccles, Great Harwood, Haslingden, Heaton Norris, Heywood, Horwich, Levenshulme, Little Hulton, Manchester x2, Moorside, Osbaldeston, Oswaldtwistle, Pleasington, Radcliffe, Samlesbury, Walton-le-Dale
  - St Mary of the Assumption: Burnley, Langho, Middleton
  - Our Lady of Dolours/Sorrows: Denton, Kersal
  - Our Lady of Grace: Prestwich
  - Our Lady of Hope: Salford
  - Our Lady of the Immaculate Conception: Haigh
  - Our Lady of Lourdes: Farnworth, Lostock Hall
  - Mother of God: Pendleton
  - Our Lady of Mount Carmel: Blackley, Oldham, Salford
  - Our Lady of Perpetual Succour: Longshaw
  - Our Lady Queen of Martyrs: Whalley
  - St Mary Queen of Peace: Sabden
  - Our Lady of the Rosary: Davyhulme
  - Our Lady of the Valley: Clitheroe
- St Mary Magdalene: Burnley
- St Michael: Clitheroe, Oldham, Whitefield
- St Monica (C4th): Flixton
- Holy Name: Chorlton-on-Medlock
- The Nativity: Failsworth
- St Oscar Romero (C20th): Blackburn
- St Osmund (C11th): Breightmet
- St Oswald (C7th): Royton
- St Patrick (C5th): Bolton, Collyhurst, Oldham, Walton-le-Dale
- St Paul: Pendleton, Ribchester
- St Peter: Middleton, Newchurch-in-Rossendale, Pendleton, Ribchester, Stonyhurst
  - St Peter in Chains: Mill Hill
- St Philip Neri (C16th): Radcliffe
- St Richard (C13th): Longsight
- St Robert of Newminster (C12th): Manchester
- Sacred Heart (of Jesus): Blackburn, Darwen, Gorton, Kingsway, Uppermill, Westhoughton
- Holy Saviour: Nelson
- St Sebastian (C3rd): Pendleton
- Holy Souls: Blackburn
- Holy Spirit: Manchester
- St Stephen: Droylsden
- St Teresa of Avila (C16th): Irlam, Stretford
- St Teresa (of the Child Jesus) (C19th): Intack, Little Lever
- St Thomas of Canterbury (C12th): Heaton, Higher Broughton
- St Thomas More (C16th): Middleton
- Holy Trinity: Worsley
- St Vincent de Paul (C17th): Norden, Over Hulton
- St Wilfrid (C7th): Longridge
- St William of York (C12th): Great Lever, Uppermill
- St Willibrord (C8th): Clayton
- St Winifred (C7th): Heaton Mersey
- St Wulstan (C11th): Great Harwood

== See also ==
- List of churches in Greater Manchester
