= Sacred Heart Church, Hillsborough =

Sacred Heart Church
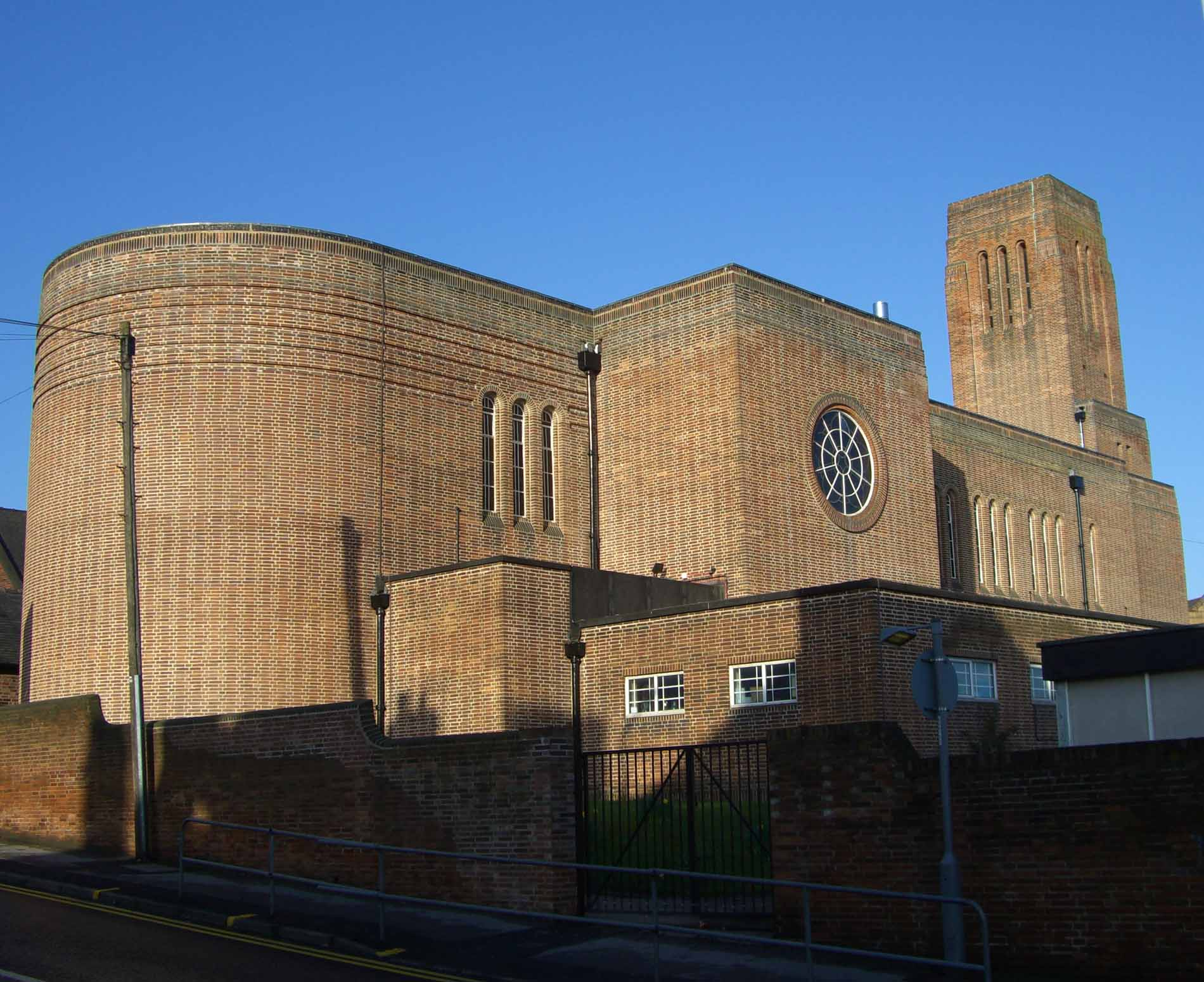
- Sacred Heart Church seen from Ripley Street.

- Location of Sacred Heart Church in Sheffield
- 53.4012°N 1.4993°W
- Location: Hillsborough, Sheffield
- Country: England
- Denomination: Roman Catholic
- Website: www.sacredheartsheffield.co.uk

History
- Founded: 5 August 1920
- Dedicated: 7 March 1947

Architecture
- Heritage designation: Grade II
- Architect: C. M. Hadfield
- Style: Romanesque Revival
- Construction cost: £13,000

Administration
- Diocese: Diocese of Hallam
- Deanery: Sheffield North
- Parish: Sacred Heart Hillsborough

Sacred Heart Church is located in Forbes Road in the Hillsborough district of the city of Sheffield, South Yorkshire, England at grid reference SK333894. It is a Roman Catholic church in the Diocese of Hallam and is a Grade II listed building. The church is situated in an elevated position and its tower is a prominent landmark in the area.

== History ==
Since the 1850s the Catholics of Hillsborough and Lower Walkley had worshipped at the Hillsborough Barracks chapel. However the increase in population necessitated that larger premises were needed and on 19 July 1903 the Sacred Heart school-chapel was opened on land between Forbes Road and Ripley Street which had been purchased for £1,080. The chapel-school which was designed by C. M. Hadfield acted as a Chapel of ease for the St Vincent's parish and cost £3,000. The building still exists today and it houses the Sacred Heart Primary School.

The parish of Sacred Heart Hillsborough was created in 1920, becoming independent of St Vincent's on 5 August that year. R. J. Dunford was the first priest and at that time the parish had no church, Father Dunford initially conducted Mass in the chapel-school. A temporary church was eventually established and opened in February 1921 at a cost of £3,000. It was not until May 1935 that work started on the parish's permanent church and on 7 July that year the foundation stone was laid by Joseph Cowgill, Roman Catholic Bishop of Leeds. The cost of construction of the church was £13,000 and £10,000 of that was donated by the widow of Philip Wake KSG, JP, magistrate for the West Riding. The church was opened on 25 March 1936 with a celebration of High Mass and sermon read by Richard Downey, Archbishop of Liverpool.

== The Church ==
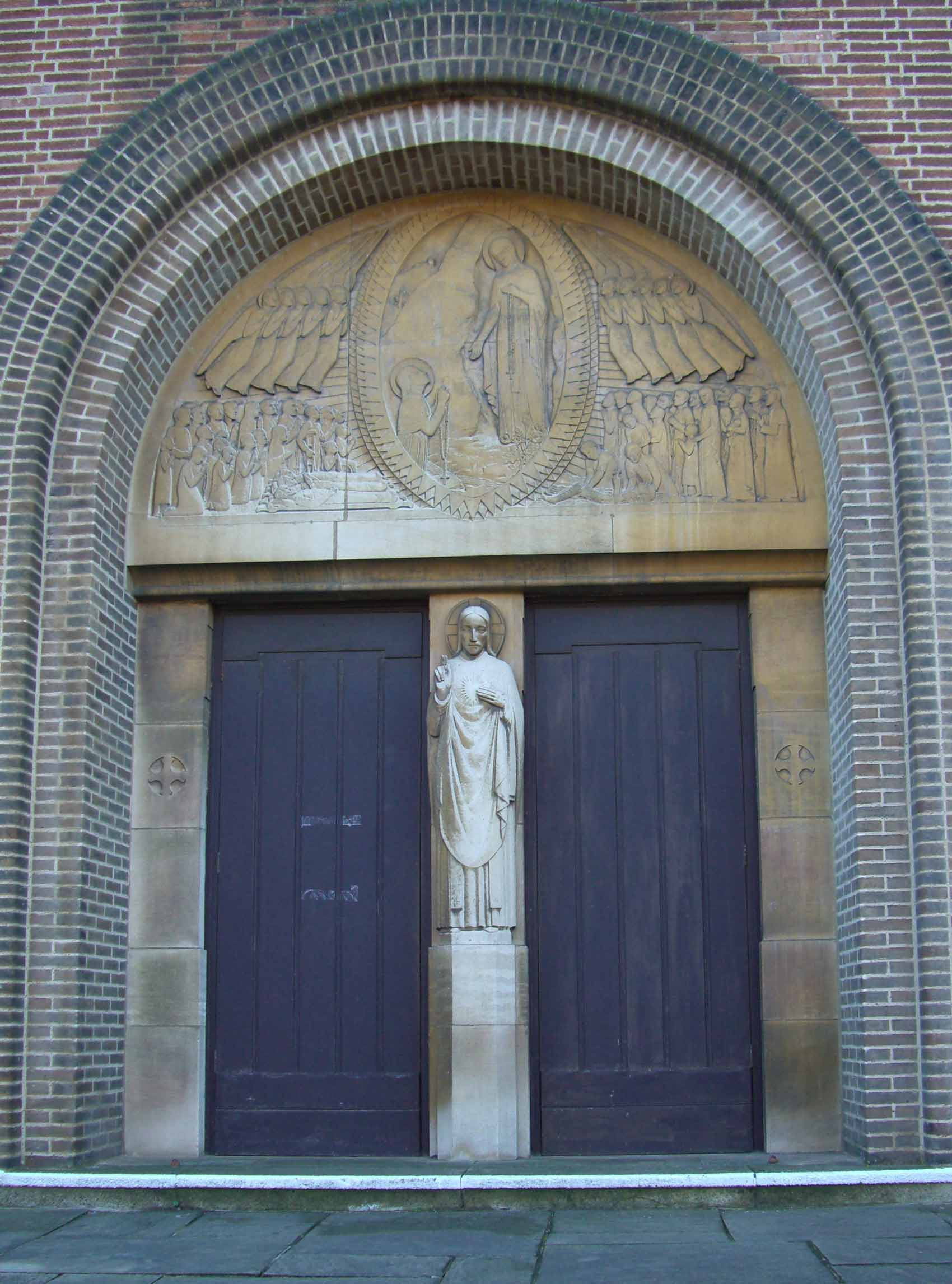
The main doors showing the statue of the Sacred Heart between them. The tympanum above features scenes from a pilgrimage to Lourdes. All sculptured by Philip Lindsey Clark

The church was designed by the architect C. M. Hadfield (of Hadfield & Son) and was constructed from specially made thin red bricks with an unusual surface texture. The external brickwork facing is unusual in that it employs Monk bond coursing which is rarely used. It has been called "one of the best interwar churches in Sheffield". Originally, the church had just one large bell supplied by John Taylor Bellfounders of Loughborough. It weighs over one ton and is in the tone of "D". In 1948 the bell tower was strengthened and a peal of smaller bells was added by the same company to complement the tenor bell. The bells are played in the manner of a carillon. The sculptor Philip Lindsey Clark (1889–1977) carved the 14 Stations of the Cross which are arranged around the internal walls, his other contributions are the statue of the Sacred Heart at the main door and the carvings in the tympanum above the door which is made of Portland stone. The tympanum depicts scenes from a pilgrimage to Lourdes and the figure in the water may be that of Alfred Wood, a parishioner who was cured of his paralysis during a pilgrimage in 1930. Canon Dunsford and the architect are depicted in the tympanum among the pilgrims.

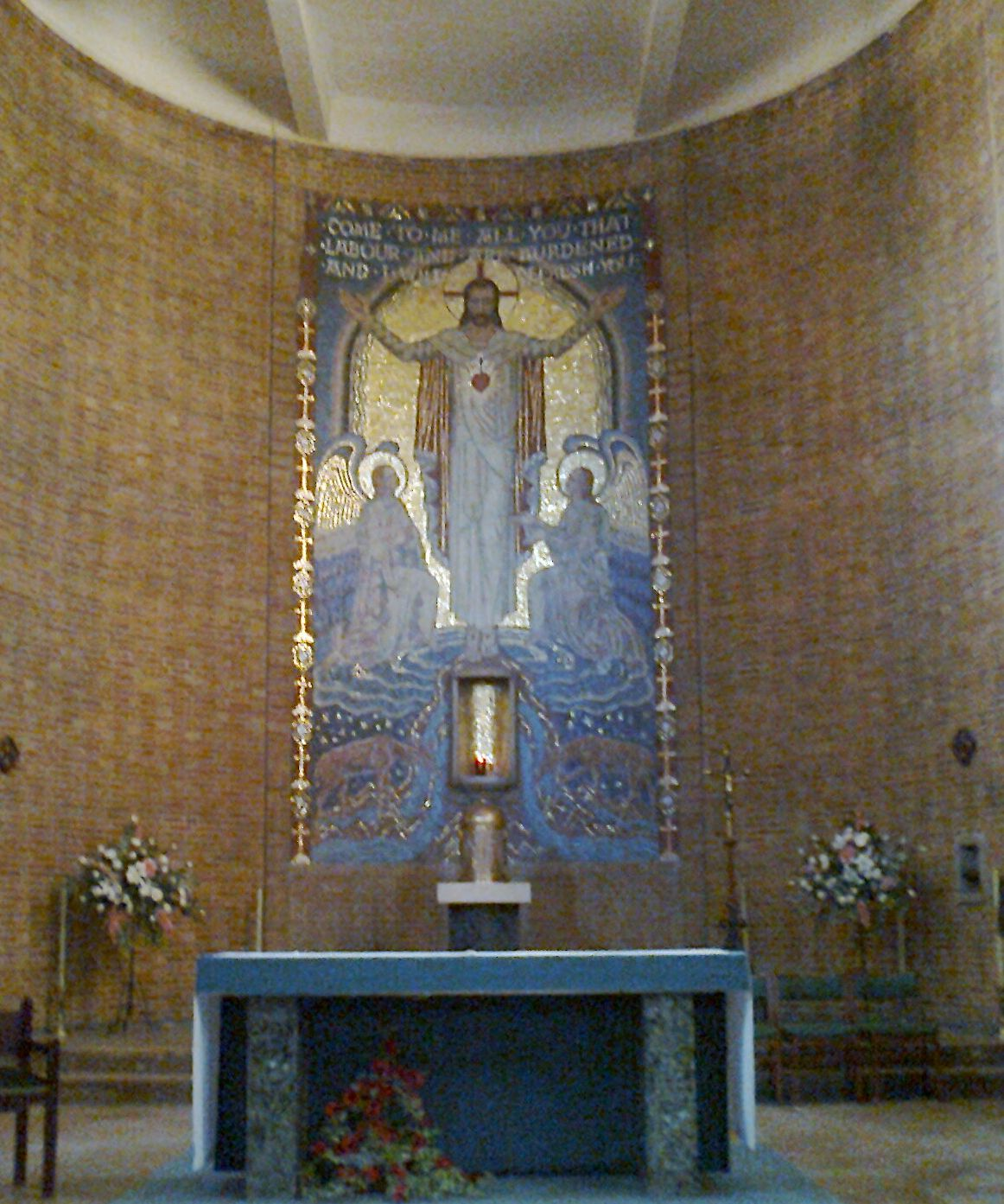
Eric Newton's mosaic of the Sacred Heart in the apse.

Eric Newton created the mosaics for the reredos behind the altar and above each of the two side chapels, the most striking of which is a figure of the Sacred Heart with supporting angels in the apse. He added more mosaics in the side chapels in 1961 to commemorate the church's silver jubilee. More changes were made to the sanctuary in the late 1960s as a result of the Second Vatican Council. The altar was moved forward to enable Mass to be celebrated versus populum and at the same time it was shortened, the left-over stone being used to form a table for the tabernacle which remains in its original position at the rear of the sanctuary.

In 1983 a slightly pitched roof replaced the flat one after the church had trouble with leaks for a number of years. The roof was once again replaced in the late 2000s.
