= All Saints' Church, Urmston =

All Saints' Church
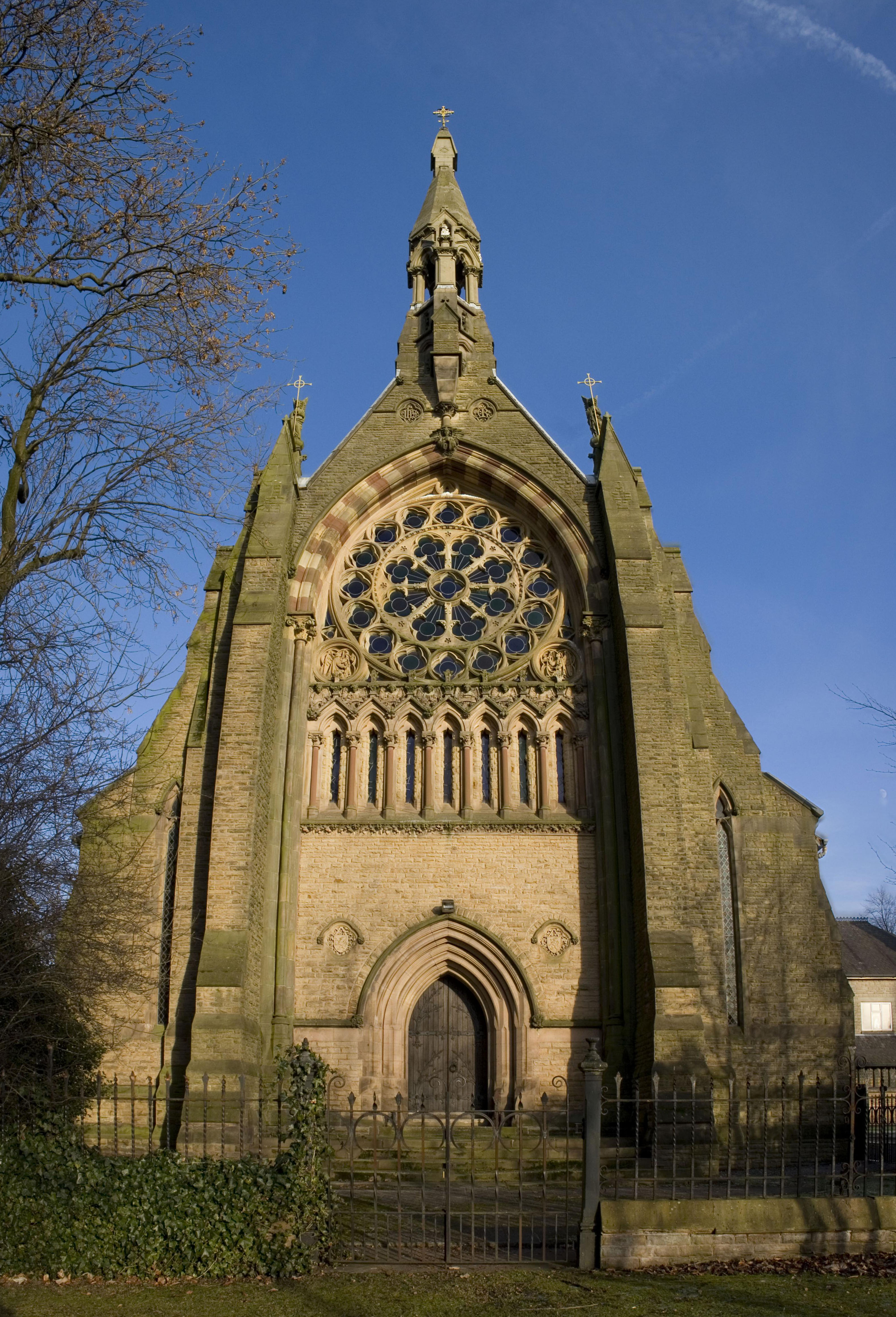
- All Saints' Church
- 53.472696°N 2.351898°W
- OS grid reference: SJ 76668 97467
- Location: Urmston
- Country: England
- Denomination: Roman Catholic
- Religious institute: Order of Friars Minor Conventual
- Website: thegreyfriars.org/barton

History
- Status: Active

Architecture
- Architect: E. W. Pugin
- Style: Gothic Revival
- Completed: June 1868
- Construction cost: £25,000

Administration
- Diocese: Salford

All Saints' Church is a Roman Catholic parish church situated between Dumplington and Barton upon Irwell, near Urmston, in Trafford, Greater Manchester, England. The church was constructed between 1867 and 1868 and was designed by E. W. Pugin in the Gothic Revival style for Sir Humphrey de Trafford. It is situated on Redclyffe Road, close to the Manchester Ship Canal. The church is a Grade I listed building and considered to be an example of Pugin's best work, according to Nikolaus Pevsner, "the masterpiece of [Pugin's] life, without any doubt." It has been served by priests from the Conventual Franciscans since 1928.

== History ==
=== Construction ===
Construction work on the church started in 1867. It was designed by E. W. Pugin. It was paid for by Sir Humphrey de Trafford, who also paid Pugin to design to St Ann's Church, Stretford. In June 1868, the church was opened by Cardinal Henry Manning. From All Saints Church, priests started missions in the area to serve the local Catholic communities. These missions eventually became churches, such as St Teresa of Avila Church in Irlam, English Martyrs Church in Urmston, and Holy Cross Church in Eccles,

The church has timber pews, stained glass and gargoyles. There is a carved stone altar and reredos. The church also contains a painting depicting E. W. Pugin with a plan of the church.

=== Conventual Franciscans ===
In 1928, the Franciscan Order of Friars Minor Conventual came to Manchester. They began a mission in the Blackley area of Manchester, in the ward of Higher Blackley. In 1929, they built a temporary church there, St Clare's Church. In 1951, they built a friary there. On 11 August 1957, the foundation stone for the permanent St Clare's Church was laid by the Archbishop of Liverpool George Beck. In 1958, the church was opened.

In 1962, the Conventual Franciscans came to Barton and started working in All Saints Church. They continue to serve both All Saints Church and St Clare's Church today.

== Photos ==
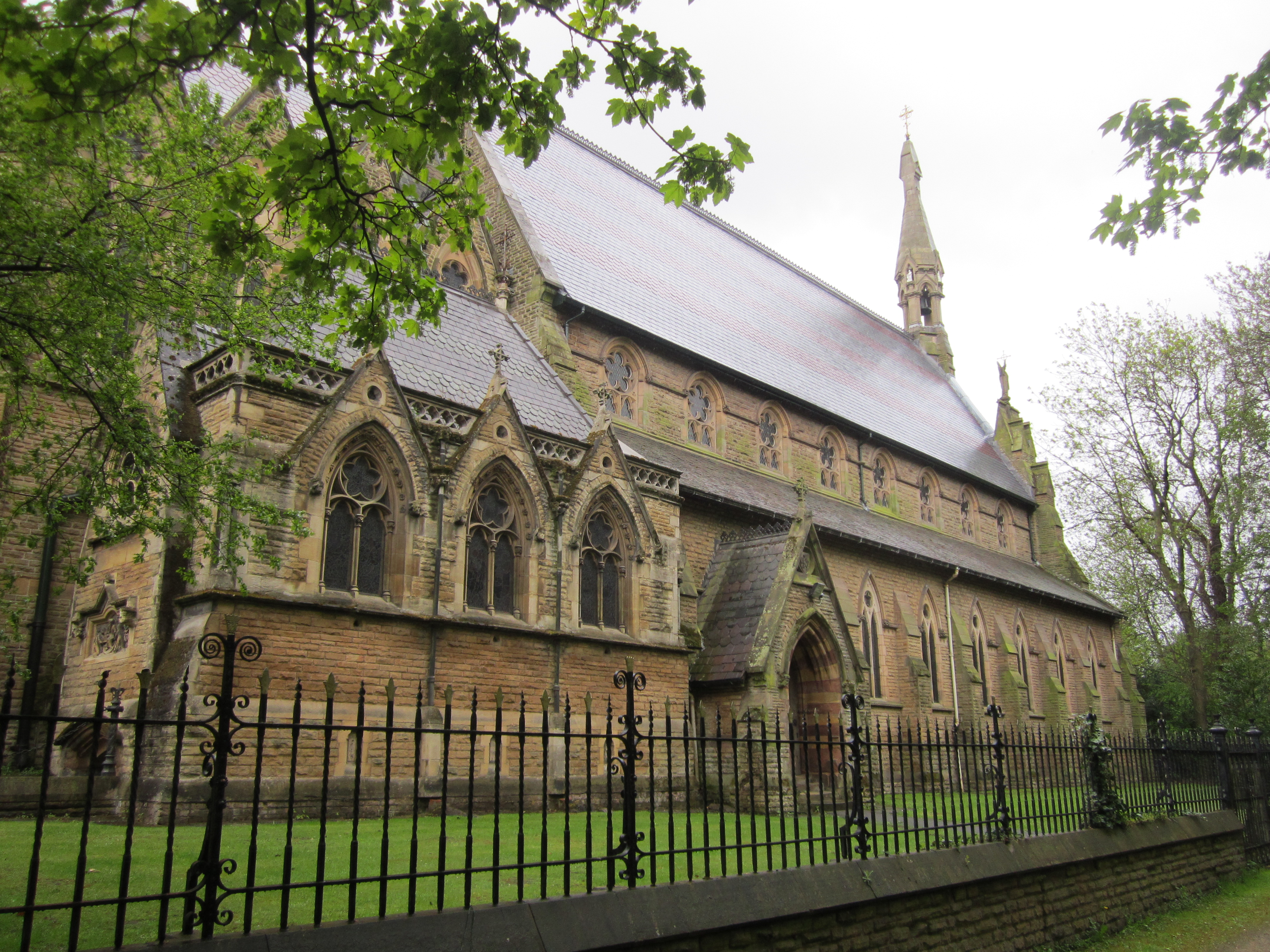
Side

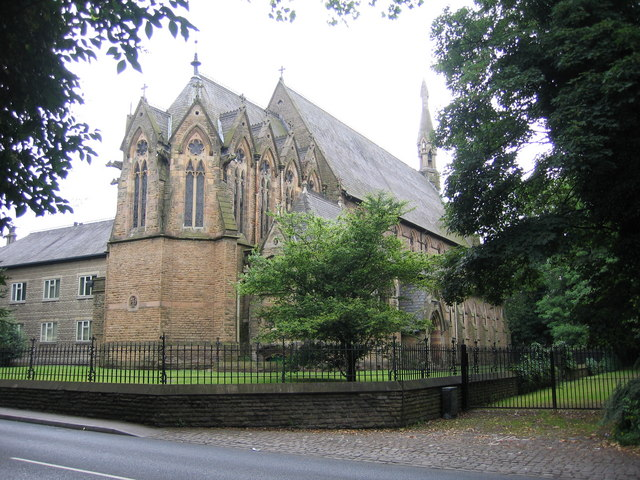
Rear

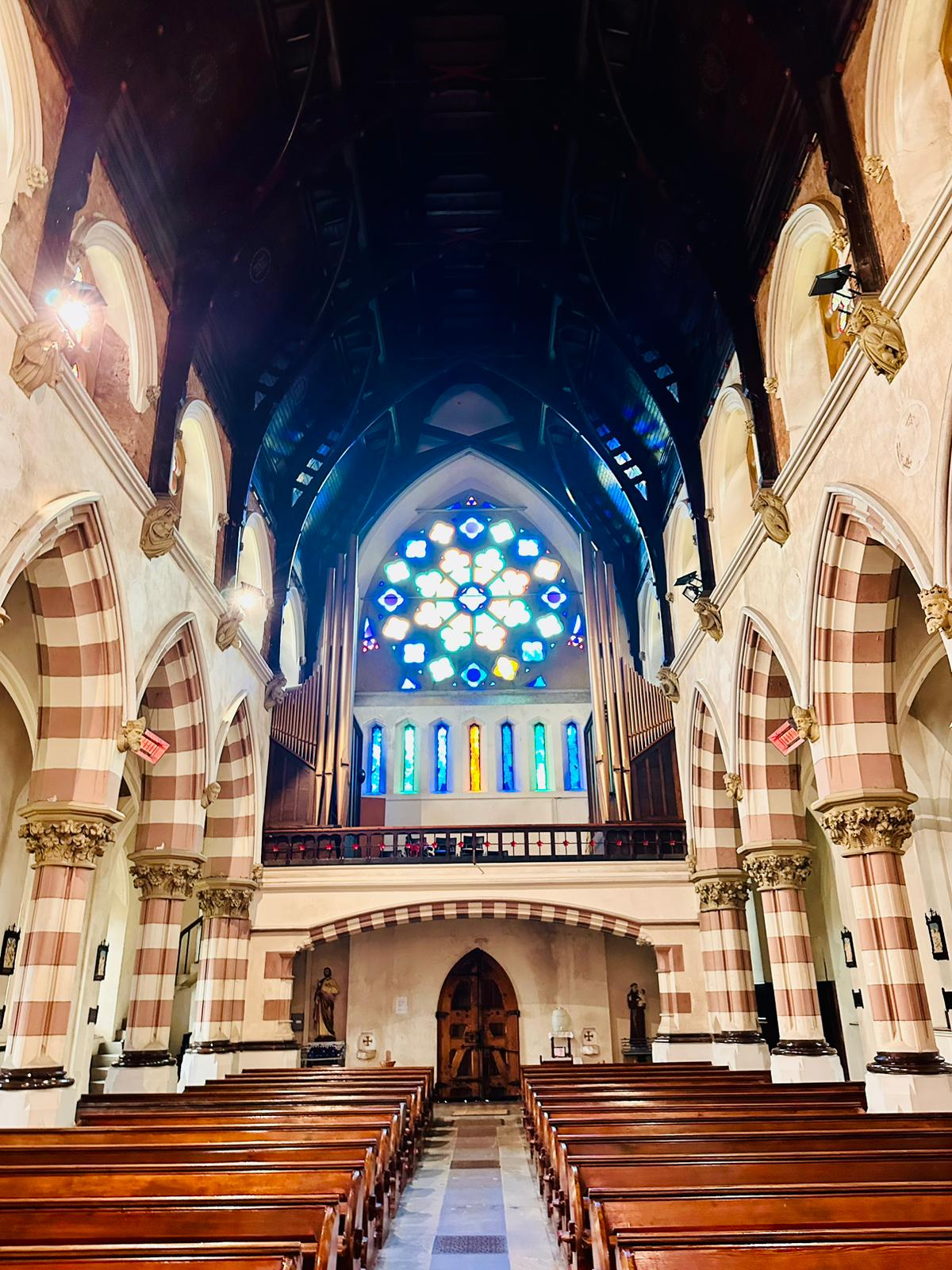
Interior of the Church toward entrance

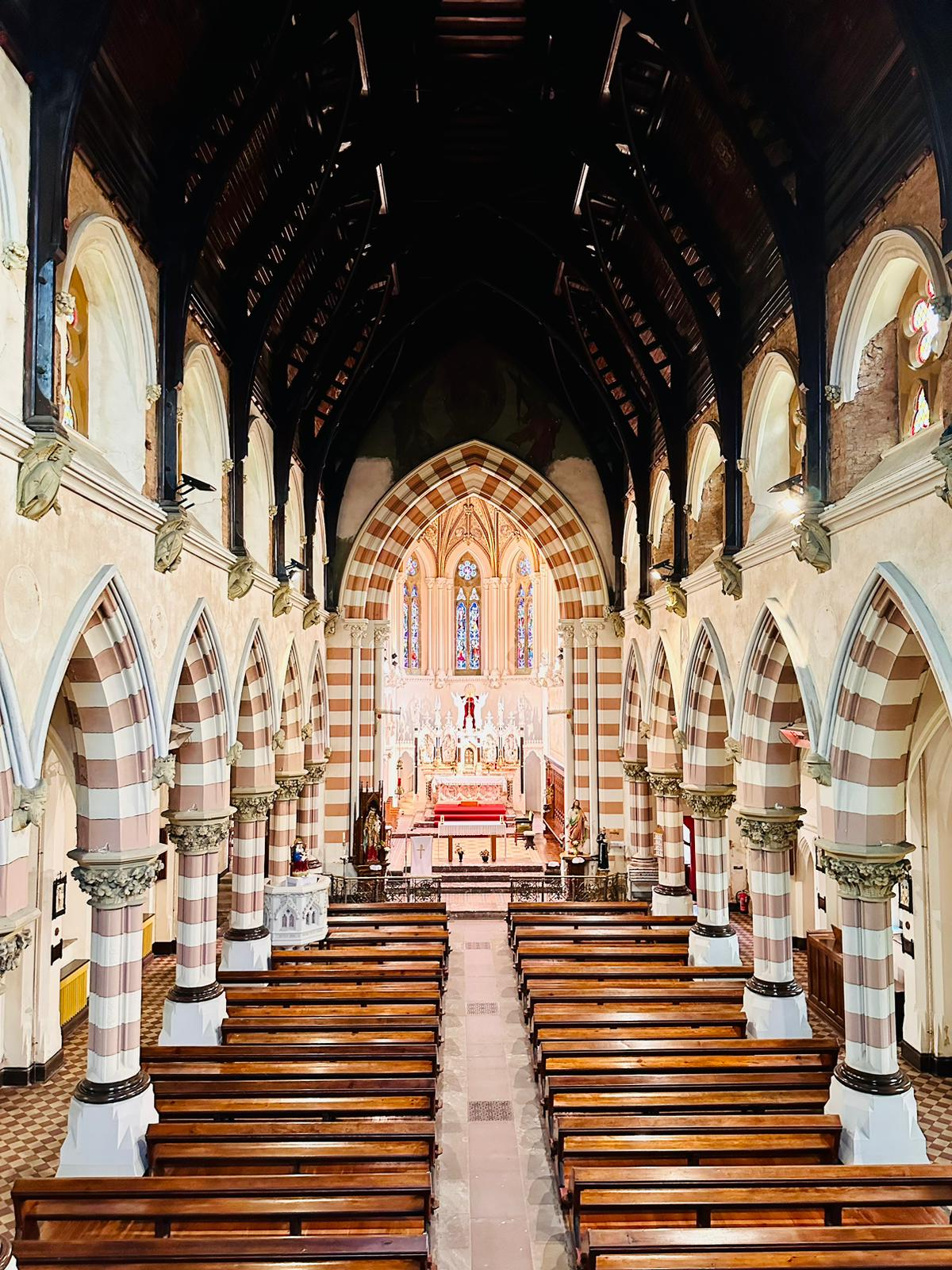
Interior of the Church toward altar

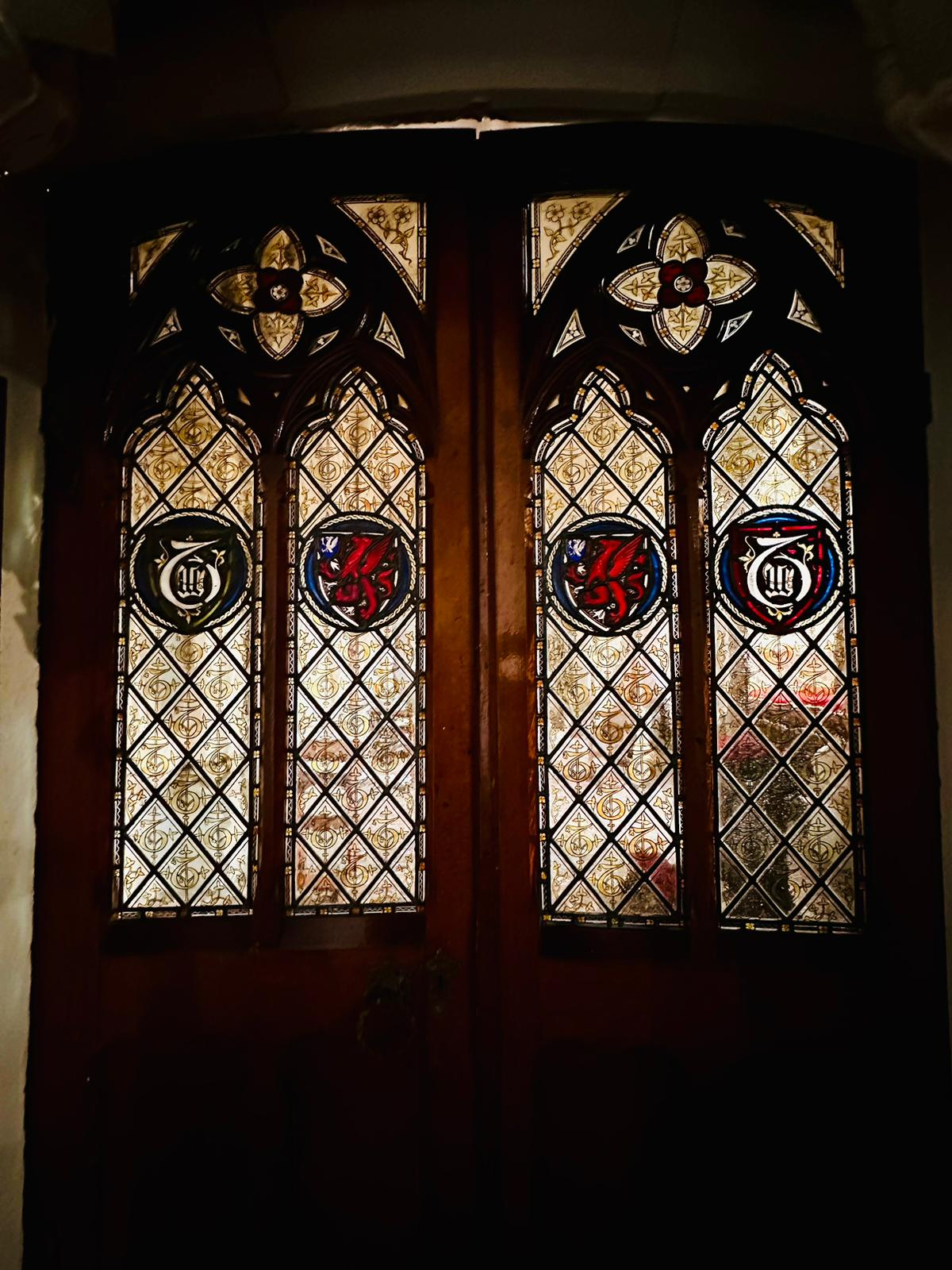
Stained glass in the doors of the DeTrafford Chapel

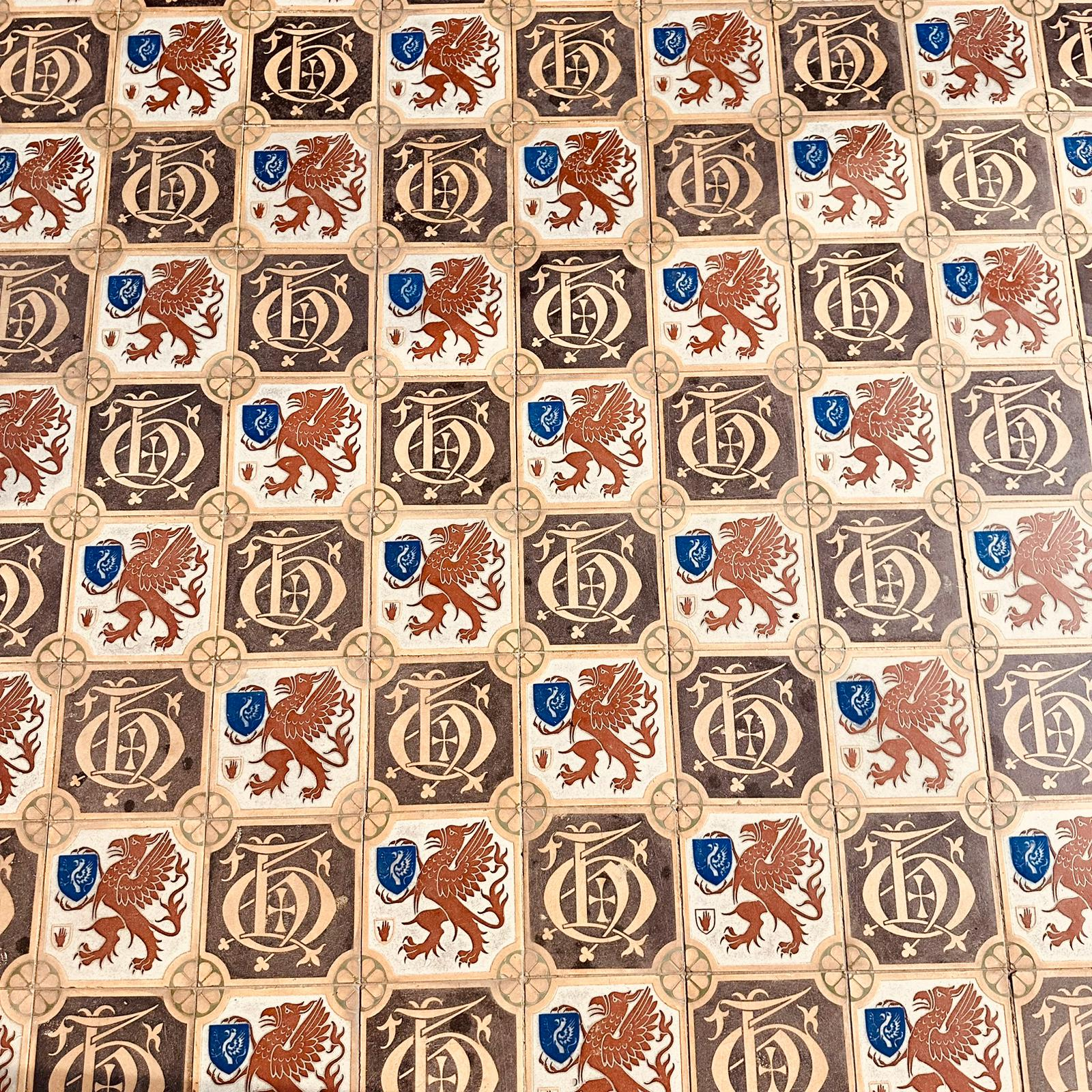
Tiles in the interior of the DeTrafford Chapel

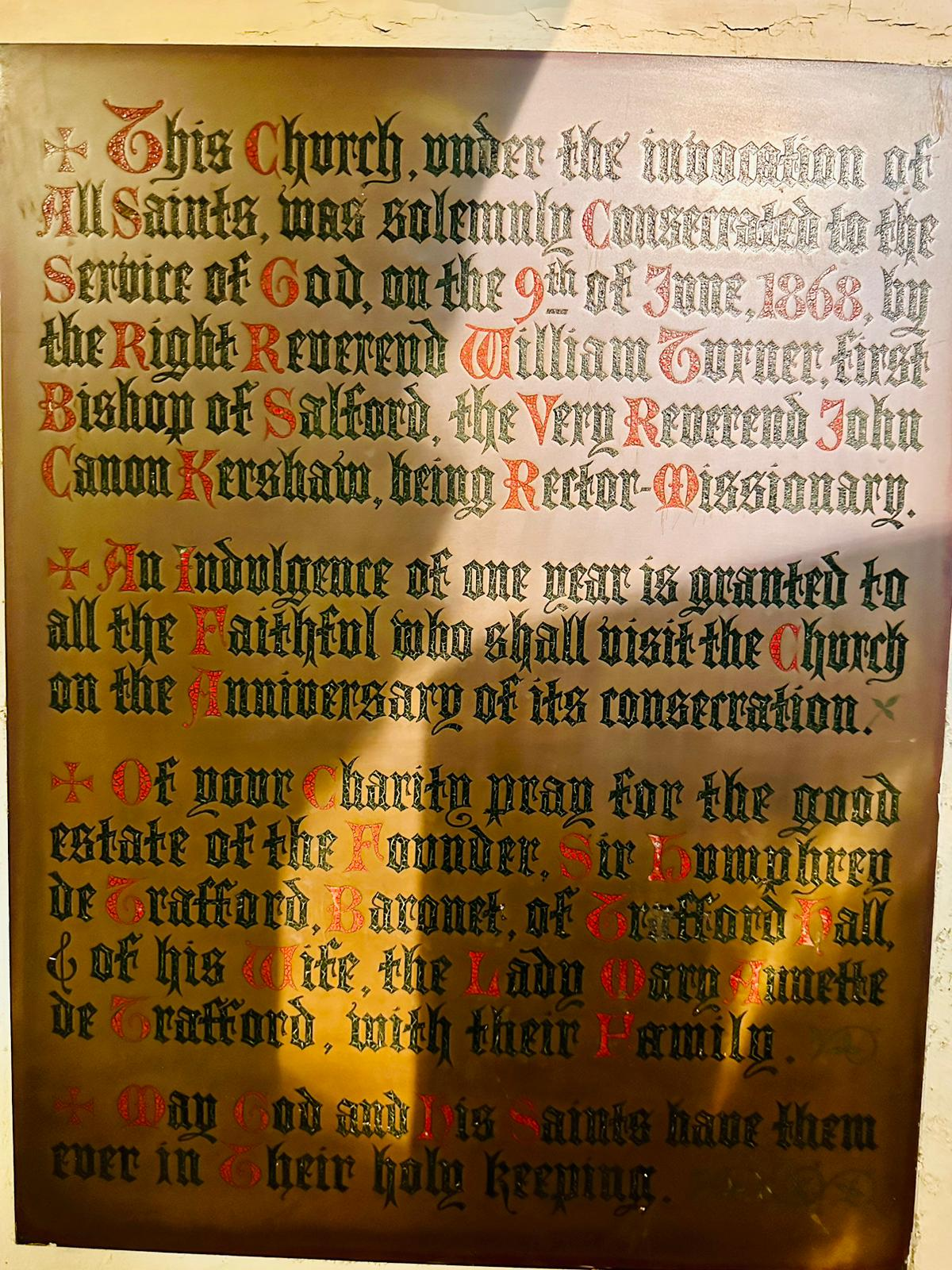
Plaque documenting the opening of the Church

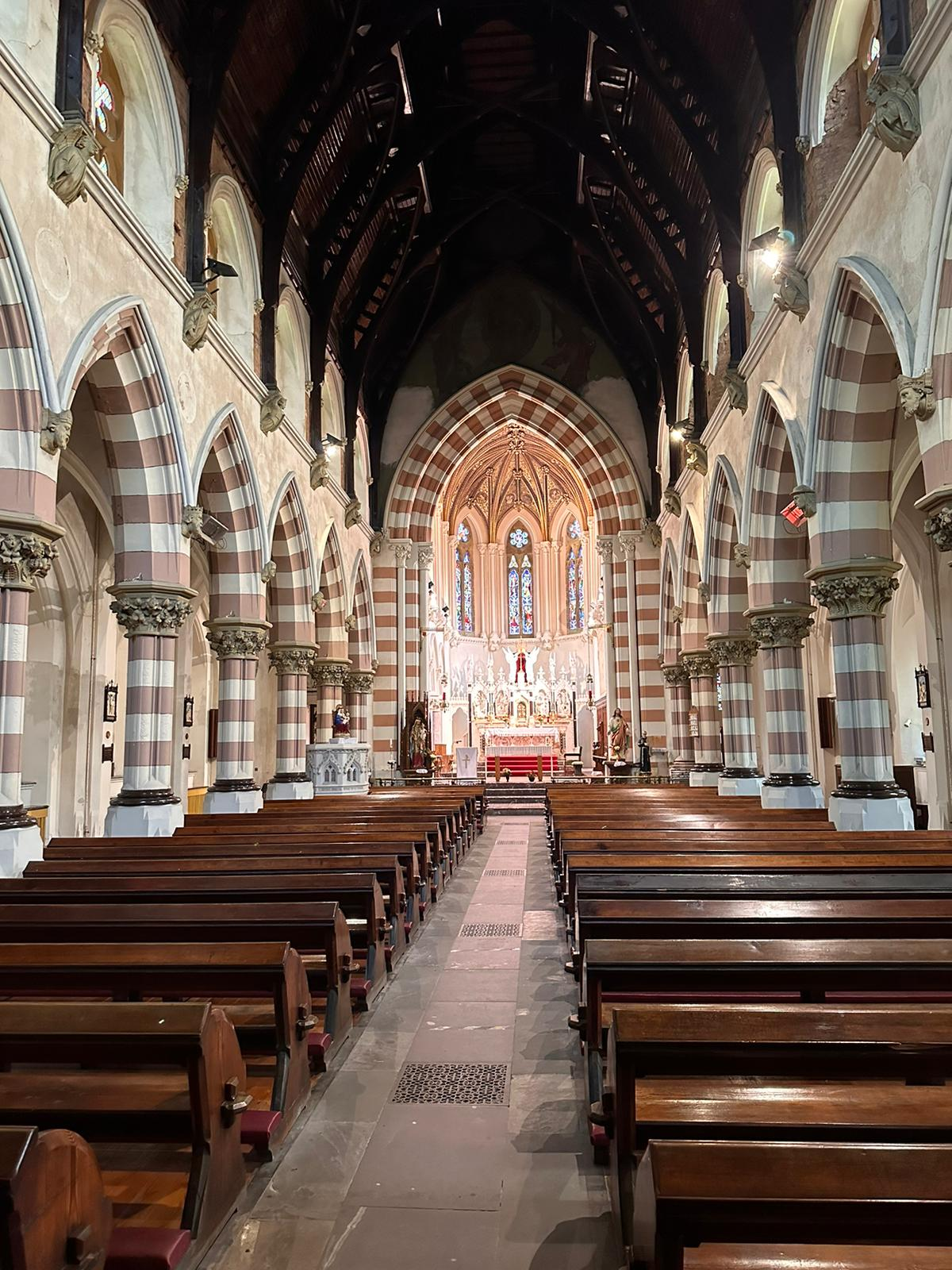
Interior of the Church

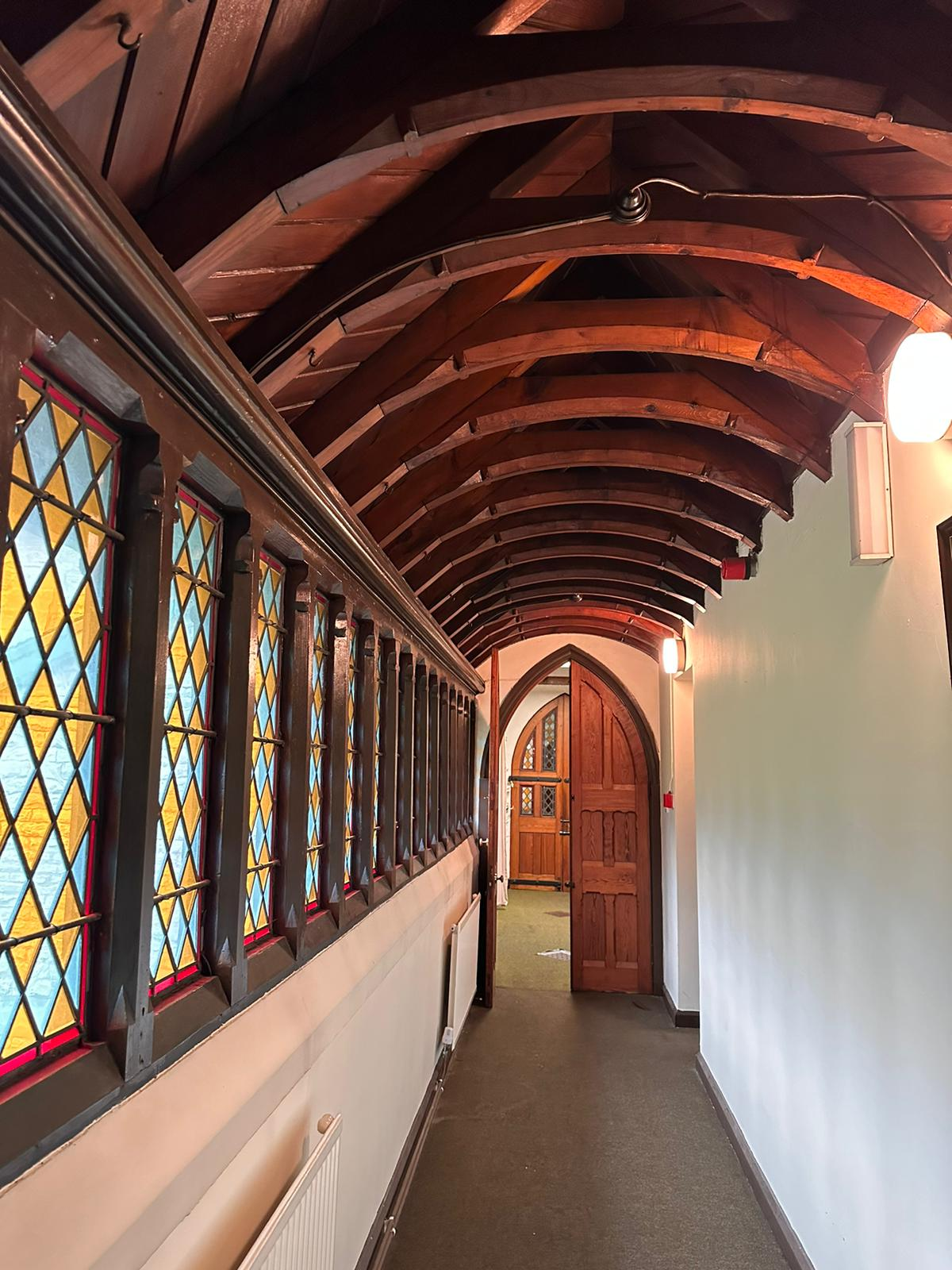
Walkway between the presbytery and the Church

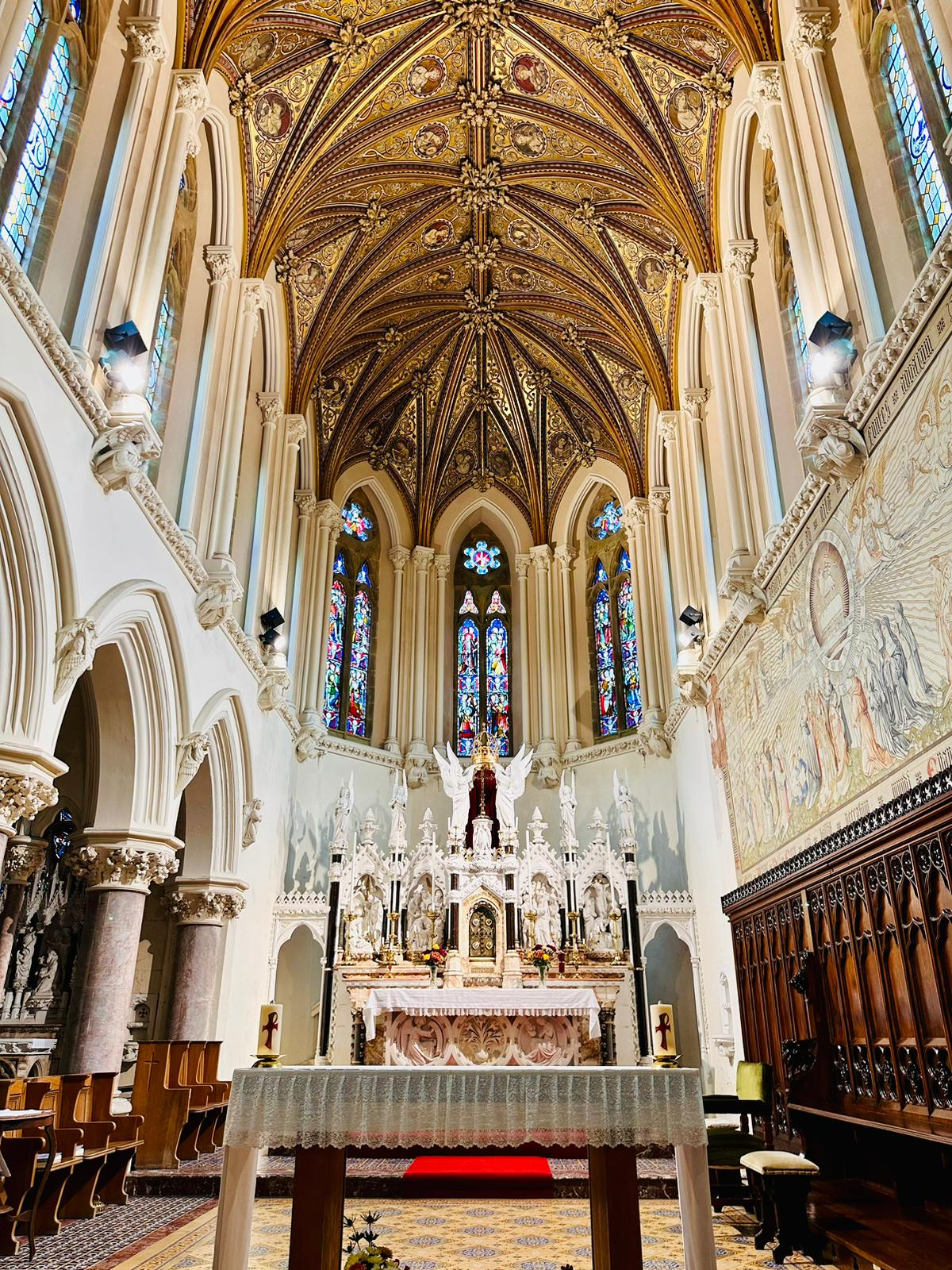
Altar of the Church

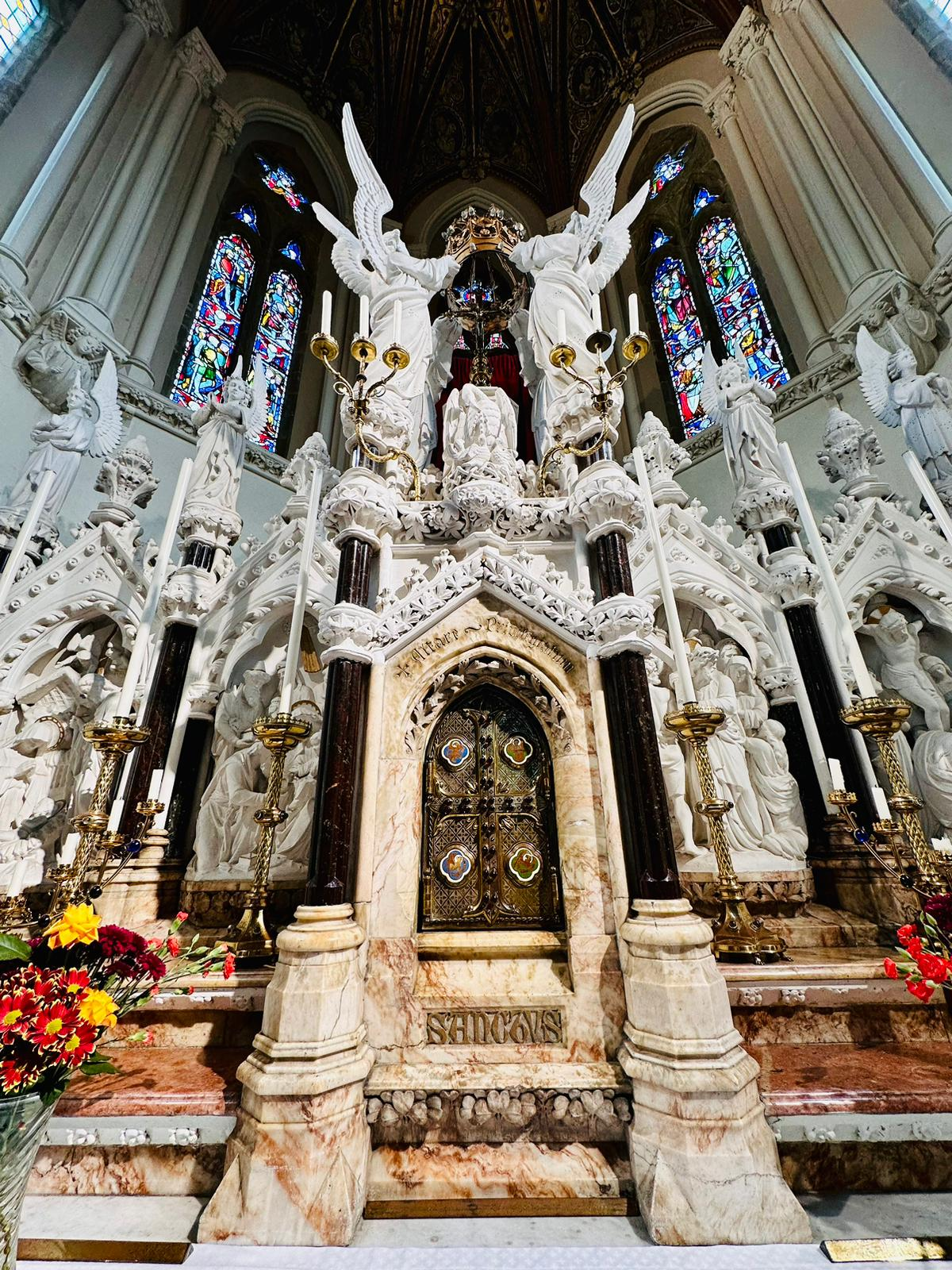
Altar of the Church

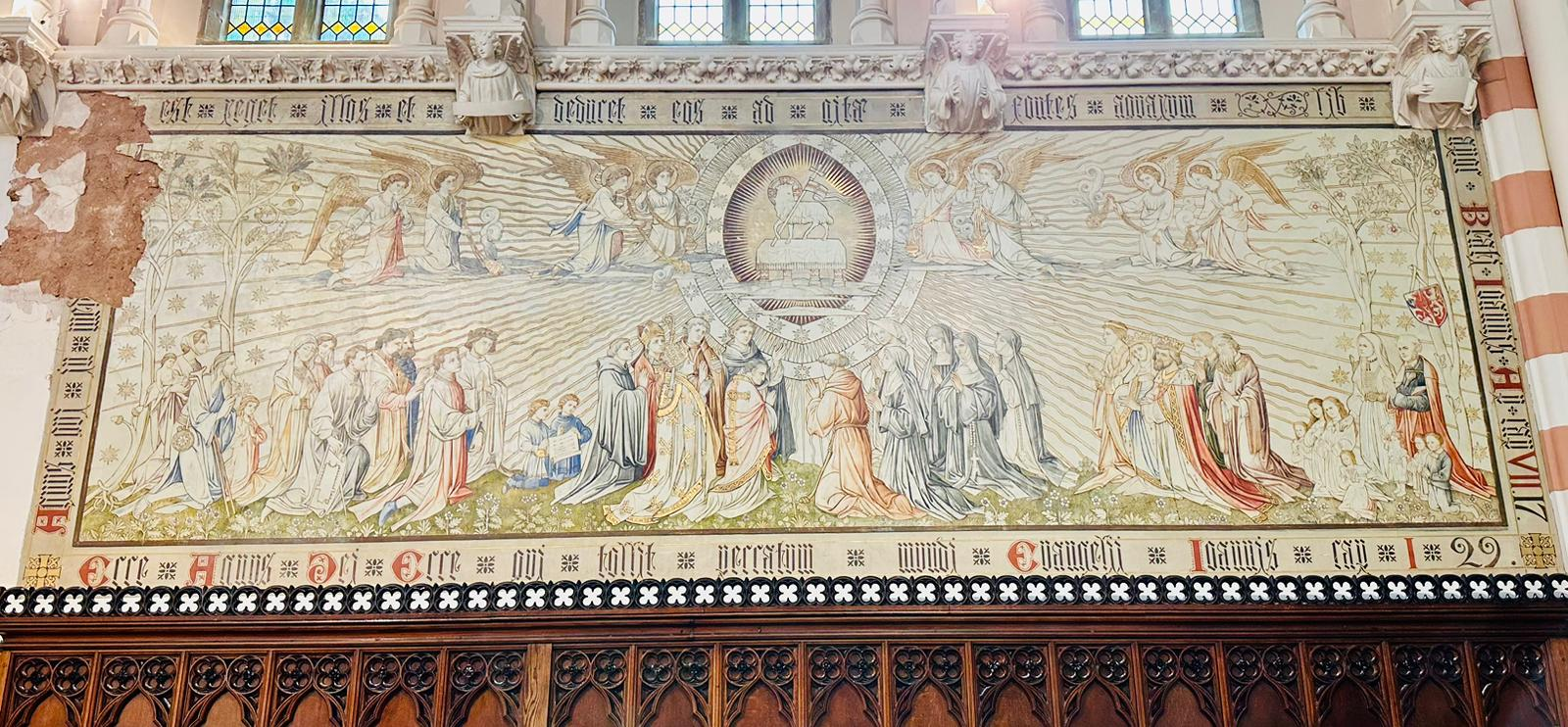
Artwork in which the DeTraffords are depicted in the bottom-right

== See also ==
- Grade I listed churches in Greater Manchester
- List of churches in Greater Manchester
- List of churches in the Diocese of Salford
- Listed buildings in Urmston
