= Listed buildings in Urmston =

Urmston is a town in the Metropolitan Borough of Trafford, Greater Manchester, England. The town, together with areas of Flixton and Davyhulme, contains 19 listed buildings that are recorded in the National Heritage List for England. Of these, one is listed at Grade I, the highest of the three grades, one is at Grade II*, the middle grade, and the others are at Grade II, the lowest grade. Until the arrival of the railway in 1872–73, Urmston was a village surrounded by a rural area, and it has since become largely residential and a commuter town. The listed buildings include churches with items in the churchyard, houses and associated structures, and four war memorials.

== Key ==
Grade	Criteria
I	Buildings of exceptional interest, sometimes considered to be internationally important
II*	Particularly important buildings of more than special interest
II	Buildings of national importance and special interest

== Buildings ==
Name and location	Photograph	Date	Notes	Grade
St Michael's Church; 53.44186°N 2.38197°W		15th century	There have been successive alterations and expansions up to the 20th century. The church is in stone with a slate roof, and consists of a nave and a chancel under a continuous roof, north and south aisles, a south porch, and a west tower. The tower has three stages, a round-arched west door, a three-light west window, an open pediment, round-arched bell openings with hood moulds and keystones, and an embattled parapet with finials. Along the sides are round-arched windows.	II*
Larkrise; 53.44216°N 2.38386°W		1672	The original part of the house has two bays in timber framing on a stone plinth, and it has been extended on both sides and above in brick. The roof is in slate, and the windows are casements. Inside there is an inglenook and a bressumer.	II
Yew Tree Farmhouse; 53.45846°N 2.38327°W		1713	The farmhouse is in rendered brick with a band and a stone-slate roof. There are two storeys, a double-depth plan, and a symmetrical front of five bays. In the centre is a two-storey gabled porch with a segmental-headed doorway and a datestone in the gable. The windows are casements, and at the rear is a stair window.	II
Jones chest tomb 53.44216°N 2.38386°W	—	c. 1751	The tomb is in the churchyard of St Michael's Church and commemorates two female members of the Jones family. It is in stone, with raised panels on the sides, and square corner balusters supporting a slab with a moulded edge. On the slab is an inscription in Latin.	II
Sundial; 53.44178°N 2.38195°W	—	1772	The sundial is in the churchyard of St Michael's Church, immediately south of the church. It is in stone and has a baluster-type shaft and a bronze dial and a broken gnomon. The sundial stands on two stone steps with cast iron railings.	II
Flixton House and outbuilding 53.44560°N 2.38352°W		Late 18th century	The house and outbuilding are in brick, the house has a hipped slate roof, and the outbuilding an asbestos slate roof. The house has two storeys, sides of four and two bays, and a later conservatory at the front. The doorway has ¾ Doric columns, a radial fanlight, and an open pediment. The windows are sashes with flat brick arches and stone sills. On the right return is a two-storey canted bay window. The outbuilding is at right angles to the rear, and has double barn doors, pitching holes, and on the roof is an open octagonal cupola with a lead canopy and a ball finial.	II
Garden wall, Flixton House; 53.44579°N 2.38262°W	—	Late 18th century	The wall runs along the north side of the garden. It is in brick with stone copings and has buttresses on the south side. The wall is about 3 metres (9.8 ft) tall, it contains two elliptical-headed openings, and has been repaired with 20th-century brick in places.	II
16 The Village; 53.44231°N 2.38410°W	—	Late 18th to early 19th century	A brick house, partly rendered, with a slate roof. There are two storeys, two bays, an additional bay to the left, a 20th-century porch at the rear, and a lean-to conservatory on the left. The windows are casements with cambered brick heads.	II
The Old Rectory; 53.44178°N 2.38809°W	—	1825	A brick house on a stone plinth with a slate roof, it has two storeys and a symmetrical front of three bays. The central semicircular-headed doorway has engaged Roman Doric columns and a fanlight. The windows are sashes with stone sills and flat brick arches, and at the northwest corner is an inserted square bay window.	II
Newcroft House; 53.44686°N 2.33600°W	—	Early 19th century	A brick house on a stone plinth with a band and a slate roof. There are two storeys, a double-depth plan, a symmetrical front of three bays, and a lean-to greenhouse on the left. The outer bays project slightly, and above the door is a fanlight. The windows on the front are sashes with stone sills and flat brick arches, and at the rear are horizontally-sliding sashes.	II
Commemorative urn 53.45712°N 2.37930°W		Mid to late 19th century	A large plain stone urn about 3 metres (9.8 ft) tall on a stepped plinth. It is surrounded by trees and is said to mark the burial place of two racehorses.	II
All Saints' Church, Urmston; 53.47342°N 2.35296°W		1867–68	A Roman Catholic Church designed by E. W. Pugin in Gothic Revival style. It is in stone and has slate roofs with coped gables, pierced ridge tiles, and iron cross finials. The church consists of a nave with a clerestory, north and south aisles, a chancel with a polygonal apse and a north chapel. At the west end is a large rose window above an arcade of lancet windows and a doorway. These are flanked by gableted buttresses, and on the apex of the gable is a bellcote. Above each window in the chancel is a coped gable.	I
All Saints' Presbytery; 53.47324°N 2.35254°W		1867–68	The presbytery was designed by E. W. Pugin in Gothic Revival style. It is in stone on a projecting plinth, and has bands and a slate roof with a coped gable. There are two storeys and three bays, with a gabled wing on the left containing a canted bay window. In the centre is a recessed porch above which is an inscribed plaque. To the right is a mullioned and transomed window, on the upper floor are mullioned windows, and there is a gabled oriel window in the right bay.	II
St Clement's Church, Urmston; 53.44513°N 2.35050°W		1868	The church was designed by J. Medland Taylor in Gothic Revival style, the north aisle was added in 1873–75, the west end was lengthened in 1887–88, and the tower was built in 1899–1903. The church is in stone with a slate roof, and consists of a nave, north and south aisles, a chancel with vestries, and a northwest tower. The tower has four stages, gableted angled buttresses, a north door, clock faces, and a coped parapet with corner pinnacles, and there are also pinnacles on the corners of the body of the church. At the junction between the nave and the chancel is an octagonal bellcote with a conical roof.	II
St Mary's Church, Davyhulme; 53.45666°N 2.36718°W		1889–90	The church, designed by George Truefitt, is in yellow sandstone with dressings in red sandstone, it has a tiled roof with cross finials, and gables with timber framing in the apexes. The church has an irregular cruciform plan, consisting of a nave, shallow transepts, a chancel with a vestry, organ chamber and boiler room, and a large octagonal tower at the crossing. The tower has paired lancet windows, an eaves cornice, angle pinnacles, and a pyramidal roof. On the north transept is a bellcote with crocketed capitals and a pyramidal roof. On the north side of the churchyard is a sandstone wall with gate and end piers and wrought iron gates, and on the east side are railings.	II
War memorial, Jewish cemetery 53.44950°N 2.34252°W	—	1919	The war memorial consists of an obelisk with a square plan, on a tapering pedestal, on a two-stage base and a small step. At the foot of the obelisk, carved in low relief is a crowned Star of David encircled by laurels and swags. On the pedestal and base are marble plaques with inscriptions and the names of those lost in the two World Wars.	II
War memorial, St Mary's Church, Davyhulme; 53.45679°N 2.36718°W		1922	The war memorial is in the churchyard to the north of the church. It is in stone and consists of a Celtic cross on a stepped plinth. On the south face of the cross is a relief carving of a sword, and on its base are the names of those lost in the First World War. On three sides of the plinth are inscriptions, and the memorial is surrounded by a low sandstone wall.	II
Davyhulme Circle war memorial 53.45763°N 2.35729°W		1924	The war memorial is in the centre of a roundabout, and is in sandstone. It consists of a tall, slender, square cenotaph on a tall base with low buttresses, and is surmounted by a clock. Each face of the cenotaph is incised with a cross, and on the west face are inscriptions and the names of those lost in the two World Wars.	II
Urmston memorial cross 53.45083°N 2.35410°W		c. 1930	The war memorial is in Golden Hill Park, and consists of a granite Celtic cross. This is decorated with interlace carving in low relief, and on the front is a reversed sword. The cross stands on a tapering pedestal on a four-stepped base. On the pedestal and the base are inscriptions relating to both World Wars.	II
