= St Patrick's Church, Bolton =

St Patrick's Church
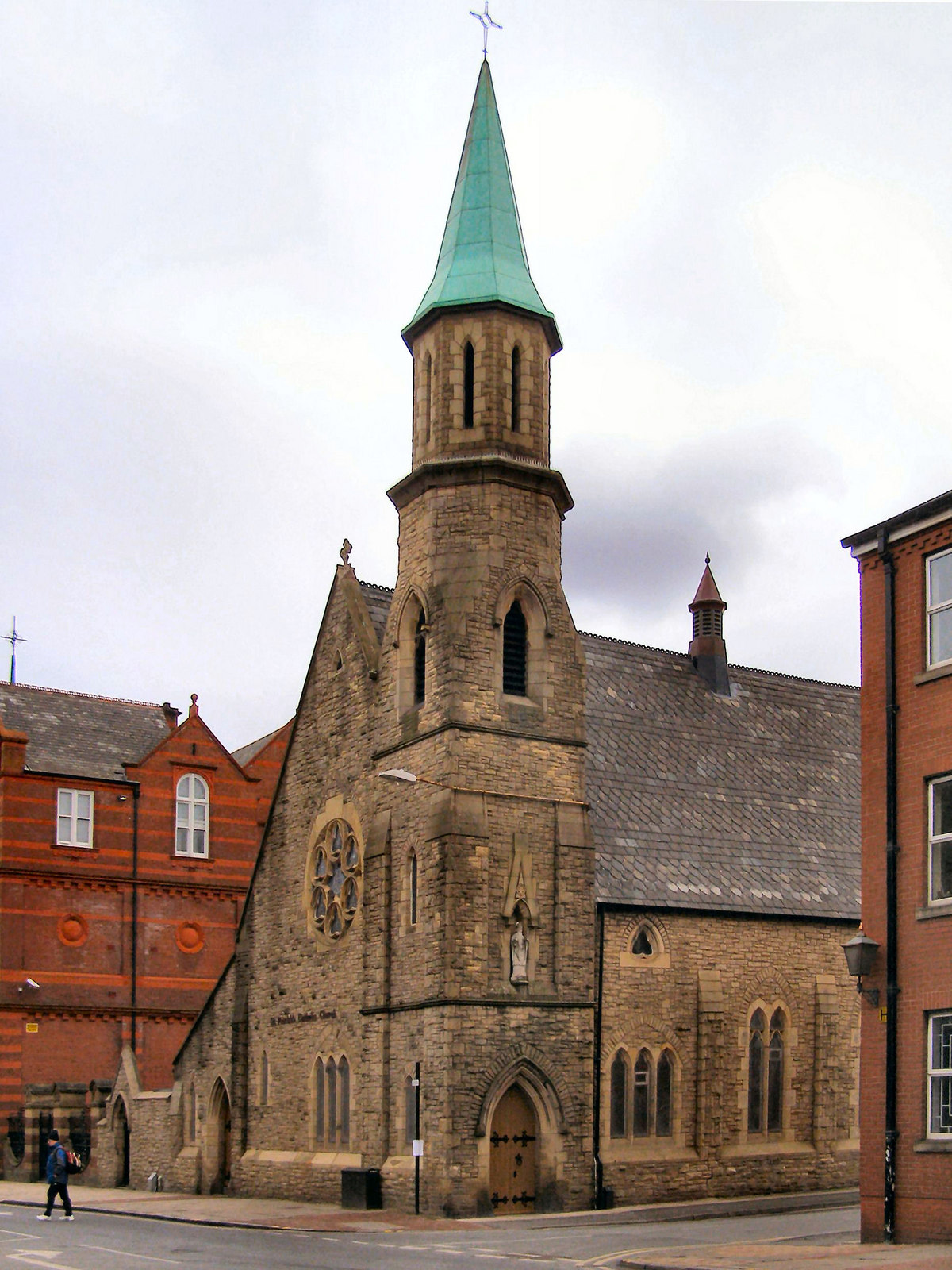
- St Patrick's Church
- 53.5765°N 2.4273°W
- OS grid reference: SD 71801 08961
- Location: Bolton, Greater Manchester
- Country: England
- Denomination: Roman Catholic
- Website: St Patrick's Church

History
- Status: Active
- Dedication: Saint Patrick

Architecture
- Functional status: Parish church
- Heritage designation: Grade II listed
- Designated: 30 April 1999
- Architect: Charles Holt
- Style: Gothic Revival
- Completed: 17 March 1861

Administration
- Province: Liverpool
- Diocese: Salford
- Deanery: Bolton
- Parish: St Edmund and St Patrick

St Patrick's Church is a Roman Catholic Church in Bolton, Greater Manchester, England. It was built in 1861 and is a Gothic Revival style building. It is situated on the corner of Great Moor Street and Johnson Street, to the west of Bradshawgate in the centre of the town. It is a Grade II listed building.

== History ==
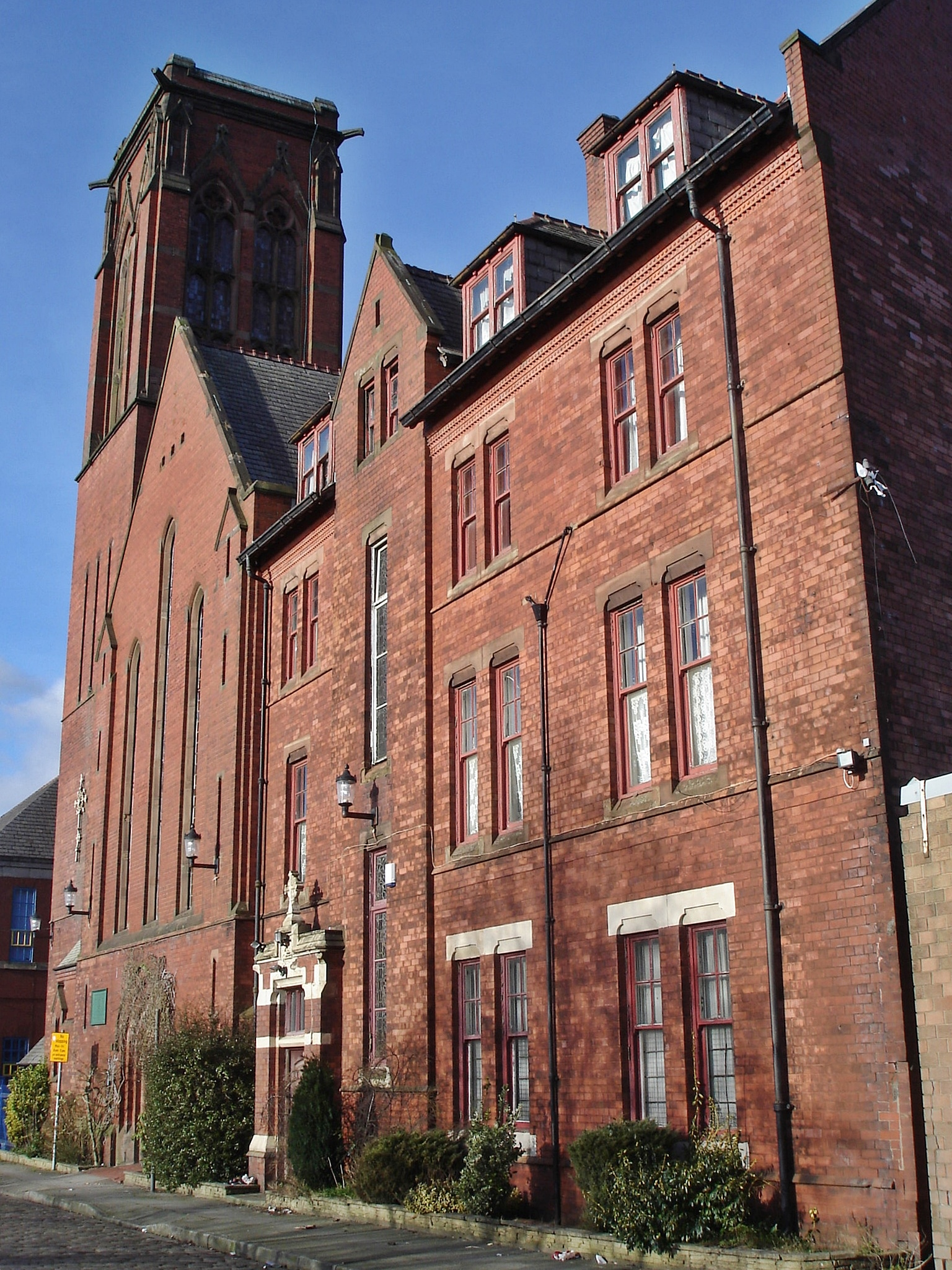
Ss Peter and Paul Church, from which St Patrick's Church was founded.

=== Foundation ===
In 1794, the first Roman Catholic church in the Bolton area since the English Reformation was established. It was St Peter and Paul Church on Pilkington Street. It was built from 1798 to 1800 outside the town in a churchyard among fields. In 1853, in the school of St Peter and Paul Church, it was decided to build a church in the centre of the town, which would become St Patrick's Church. St Peter and Paul Church was later replaced by a church built from 1896 to 1897 on the same site, which cost £20,200. In 1990, St Peter and Paul Church was reordered and in 2010 it was closed.

=== Construction ===
From the meeting in 1853 to establish St Patrick's Church in Bolton, a site was later found on Great Moor Street and an architect, Charles Holt, was commissioned to build the church. On 17 March 1861, the church was opened. Originally, the school was founded around the same time and housed in a three-storey warehouse. In 1884, a purpose-built school was constructed on Dawes Street, close to Great Moor Street.

=== Developments ===
From 1907 to 1911, when a Fr John Burke was parish priest, a new high altar and the stained glass east window were installed. In 1946, the top of the spire was replaced. Afterwards, in the post-war period, the school was closed.

== Parish ==
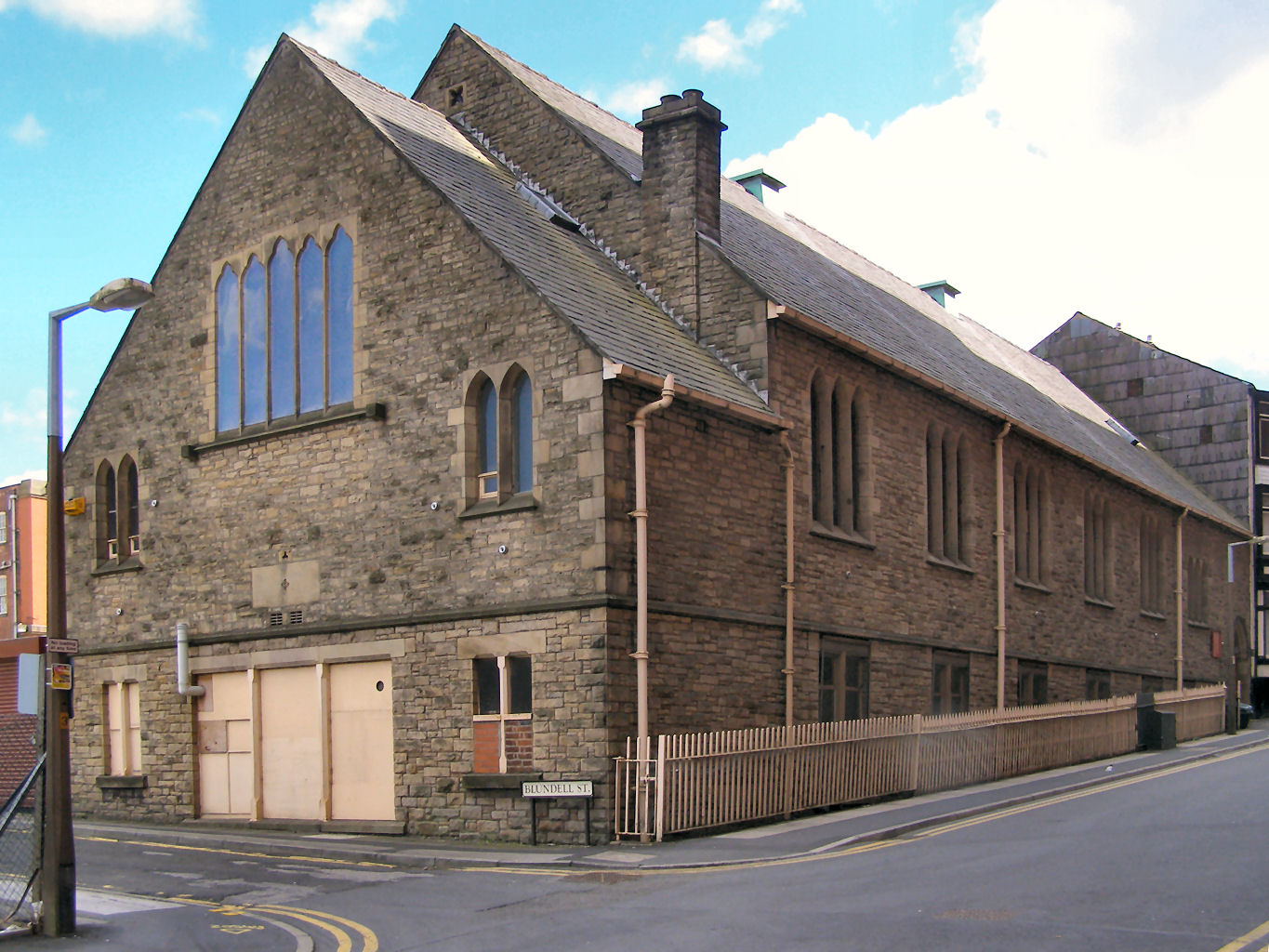
St Edmund's Church, from which St Patrick's Church is served

=== St Edmund's Church ===
St Patrick's Church is served from St Edmund's Church on St Edmund Street in Bolton. St Edmund's Church was also founded from St Peter and Paul Church. In August 1860, the foundation stone of St Edmund's Church was laid by the Bishop of Salford, William Turner on Grime Street (which was later renamed St Edmund Street). It was finished in 1861. Originally, it had the school situated on the lower storey of the church. In the early twentieth century, the school was relocated and the lower storey became the parish hall. In the 1960s, the hall was extended and the church was reordered.

=== Merger ===
In 2003, the parishes of St Peter and Paul, St Patrick and St Edmund were merged. In 2010, with the closure of St Peter and Paul Church, the parish became known as St Edmund and St Patrick.

St Patrick's Church has one Sunday Mass, it is at 11:30am. St Edmund's Church has one Sunday Mass at 10:00am

== See also ==
- Listed buildings in Bolton
- Roman Catholic Diocese of Salford
