= St John the Baptist Church, Rochdale =

Church in Greater Manchester, England

St John's Church
- St John the Baptist Church
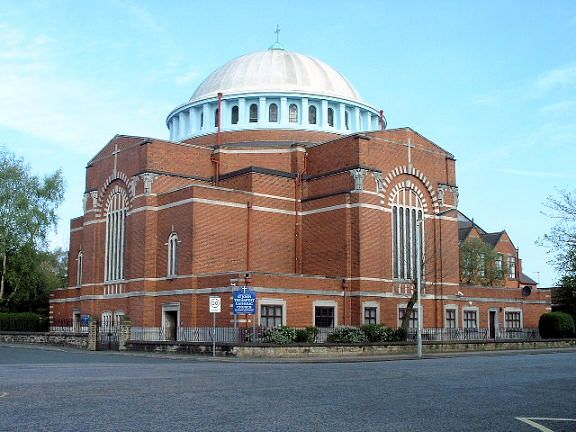

- Location within Greater Manchester
- 53.6113°N 2.1549°W
- OS grid reference: SD 89845 12758
- Location: Dowling Street, Rochdale, Greater Manchester
- Country: England
- Denomination: Roman Catholic
- Website: stjohnthebaptistrc.org

History
- Status: Active
- Dedication: John the Baptist

Architecture
- Functional status: Parish church
- Heritage designation: Grade II* listed
- Designated: 15 September 1998
- Architect(s): Henry Oswald Hill and Ernest Bower Norris
- Style: Byzantine Revival
- Groundbreaking: 1925
- Completed: 1927

Administration
- Province: Liverpool
- Diocese: Salford
- Deanery: St Thérèse of Lisieux
- Parish: St Gabriel and the Angels and St John the Baptist

St John the Baptist Church is a Roman Catholic Parish church in Rochdale, Greater Manchester, England. The parish was founded in 1830, and construction of the present church began in 1925; it was completed in 1927. The building stands on the corner of Maclure Road and Dowling Street, opposite the Greater Manchester Fire Service Museum, in the centre of the town. Designed in the Byzantine Revival style, it is a Grade II* listed building.

== History ==
=== Foundation ===
From 1824, a Catholic priest resided in Rochdale. He was Fr William Turner, who later became Bishop of Salford. Mass was originally celebrated in a room of a warehouse on Clegg Street. In 1829 St John's Church church was built and opened on Ann Street in Rochdale. Fr Turner remained in post until 1835, when he became the priest at St Chad's Church in Cheetham Hill, and was succeeded by Fr Dowling. In 1860 the original church was replaced by a brick building. Fr Dowling died in 1871 and was succeeded by the dean, Fr O'Neill. In the late 19th century, as the surrounding towns grew in population, further Catholic missions were established in the area. From 1898 to 1937, the priest at St John the Baptist Church was Canon Henry Chipp.

=== Construction ===
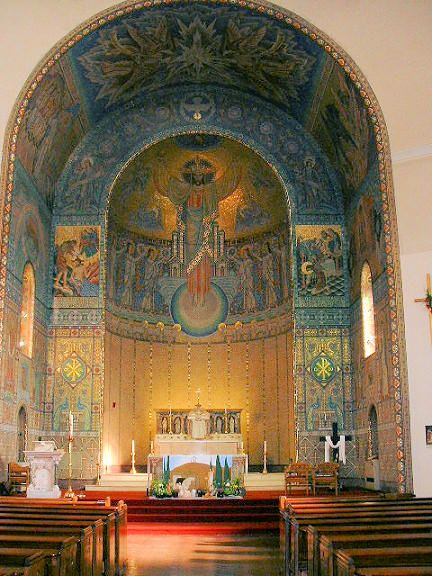
Interior

Canon Chipp sought the construction of a new, larger church to replace the one made of brick. He wanted a church to resemble the Hagia Sophia in Istanbul. The architect of St John the Baptist Church was Henry Oswald Hill. He was the cousin of Charles Joseph Gadd the Vicar General of the diocese. The design of the church was influenced by Westminster Cathedral and John Francis Bentley. On 21 October 1917, after making the designs for the church, Hill was killed in action during World War I flying as a captain in the Royal Flying Corp, serving in what later became No. 52 Squadron RAF. He also designed St Teresa's Church in Irlam in 1900, St Brigid's Church in Bradford in 1901, St Alphonsus in Old Trafford in 1903, Our Lady and the English Martyrs Church in Urmston in 1911, and St Joseph's Church in Heywood in 1913.

In 1918 Henry Thomas Sandy bought Hill's architectural firm. In 1920 Ernest Bower Norris joined the practice. In 1922 Sandy died and Norris ran the firm, which became known as Hill, Sandy & Norris, which ceased operations in 1969. St John's Church was the first time Norris had built a Byzantine-style church. From 1962 to 1964, he designed a similar church, St John Fisher Church, in West Heath, West Midlands.

The church was built from 1925 to 1927. The original design for the church had a bell tower, which was never built. From 1930 to 1933, the mosaic in the sanctuary was made. The theme of the mosaic is eternal life. It was designed by Eric Newton of Ludwig Oppenheimer Ltd, cost £4,000 and was made by craftspeople in Manchester.

In 1966 a presbytery was built, attached to the north side of the church. The architects for it were Desmond Williams & Associates. In 1998 a residence was added to the side of the church. This was done by demolishing the presbytery and a section of the east transept.

== Parish ==
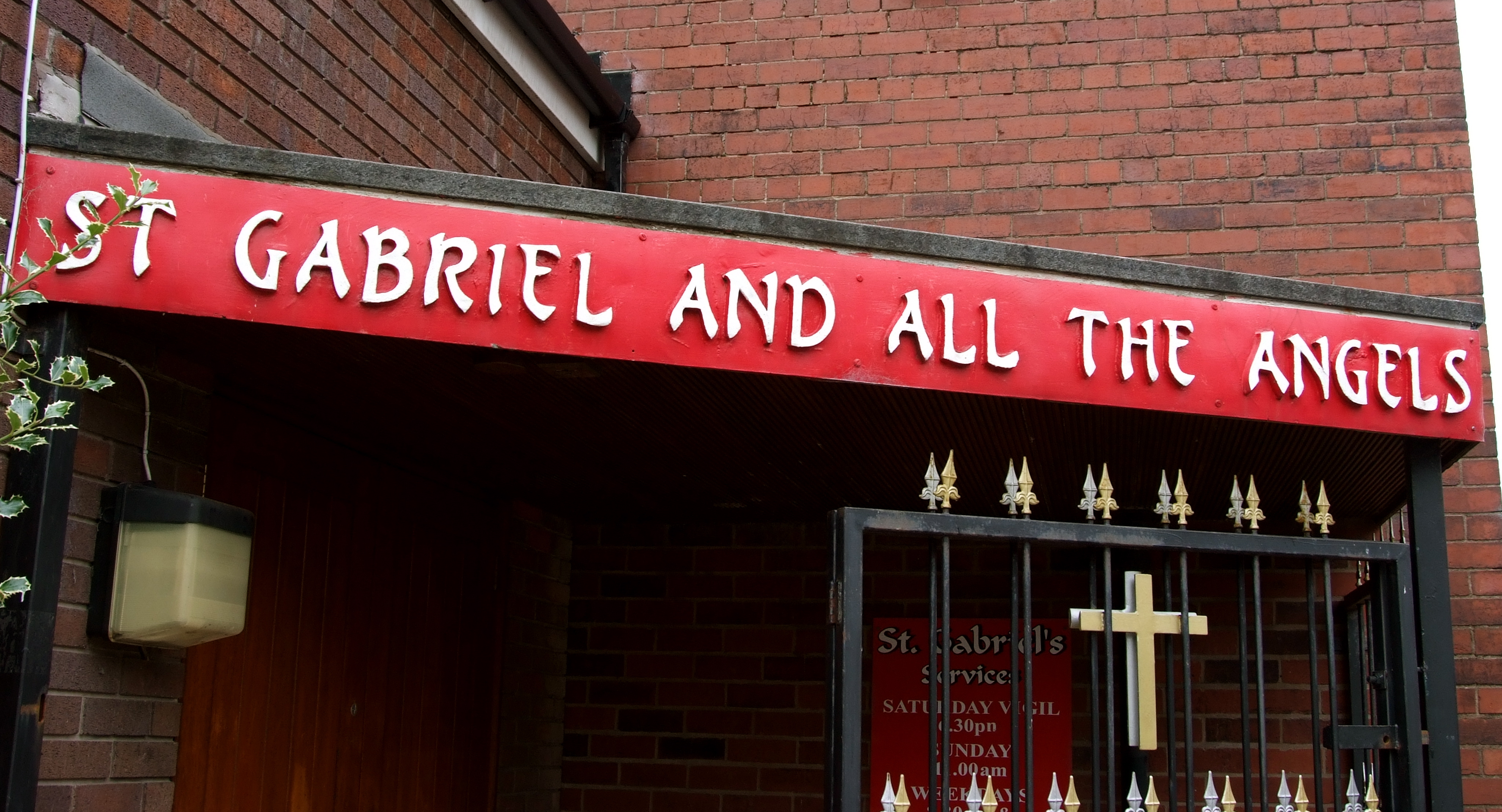
Front entrance, St Gabriel and the Angels Church, Castleton

St John the Baptist Church together with St Gabriel and the Angels Church in Castleton, Greater Manchester, are part of the same parish called the Parish of St Gabriel and the Angels and St John the Baptist. In 1879 St Gabriel and the Angels Church started as a mission from St John the Baptist Church. In 1884 a building housing a chapel and school was built. In 1894 a presbytery was added. In 1951 with the increasing Catholic congregation in the area, the former Princess Cinema in Smalley Street (built in 1900) was bought and adapted to replace the old chapel and became the present St Gabriel and the Angels Church.

St John the Baptist Church has a Sunday Mass at 9:30am. St Gabriel and the Angels Church has one Sunday Mass at 11:00am.

== See also ==
- Grade II* listed buildings in Greater Manchester
- Listed buildings in Rochdale
- Roman Catholic Diocese of Salford
