= Eric Newton (art critic) =

English artist, writer, broadcaster and art critic

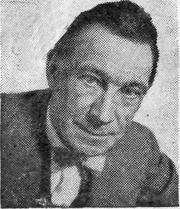
- Born: Eric Oppenheimer; 28 April 1893; Marple Bridge, Manchester, UK
- Died: 10 March 1965 (aged 71); London, UK
- Education: University of Manchester
- Spouse: Stella Mary Pearce

Eric Newton (28 April 1893 – 10 March 1965) was an English artist, writer, broadcaster and art critic. He produced several books in addition to his newspaper and radio work and created mosaics for Ludwig Oppenheimer Ltd, mostly on a religious theme. His radio broadcasts made him well known to the British public in the 1930s.

== Career ==
After gaining a BA from Manchester University in 1913, he worked as a designer at Ludwig Oppenheimer Ltd, the mosaic firm founded by his grandfather and based in Old Trafford, Manchester. His work, and that of the Oppenheimer firm is still to be seen in several churches in Britain and Ireland. He took part in the Paris exhibition in 1925.

He is best known as an art critic and writer. He was appointed art critic of the Manchester Guardian in 1930, although he had provided copy for that paper for some years prior to this. He was art critic for The Times for three years from 1947, and wrote frequently for The New York Times, Time and Tide magazine and ArtReview

Newton delivered radio lectures on art, notably the 1935 BBC 12 part series "The Artist and his Public" subsequently turned into the first of several books. and took part in the radio arts series The Critics. In this programme, his Times Obituary states "his lucidity and critical sense were trenchantly displayed". The Oxford Dictionary of Art describes him as "a clear and polished writer and also an articulate lecturer and radio broadcaster".

These broadcasts made his name well known and local newspaper archives reveal that Newton was clearly in demand, delivering public lectures across the country in the late 1930s and 1940s.

Newton undertook lecture tours to North America in 1937, 1953 and 1956, the 1937 tour of Canada was sponsored by the National Gallery of Canada. His diary of this tour was subsequently published (see below). The 1956 tour included the Memorial University of Newfoundland where he lectured on modern art. A photograph exists in the university archives. Newton was lecturer in art history at the Central School of Art and crafts from 1963.

His MA, completed in 1951 at Manchester was on the subject of the renaissance artist Tintoretto, and was subsequently published in 1952 as a book.

Newton was Slade Professor of Fine Art at Oxford in 1959 and art adviser to the Commonwealth Institute from 1960 to 1963. He was president of the British Section of the International Association of Art Critics between 1949 and 1961.

While he left the family firm, he continued to create mosaics for much of his life, those in the side chapels of Sacred Heart Church Sheffield being installed in 1961. The Courtauld Institute of Art holds many designs of Newton Mosaics and theatre set designs in its Stella Newton Archive.

== Personal life ==
Newton was born in 1893 to Lehmann James Oppenheimer and Edith née Newton. His mother was from Heaton Mersey. In 1908 he was awarded a Foundation Scholarship to Hulme Grammar School from Hulme's Charity. After graduation from Manchester University, he served in the army during the First World War, joining the Manchester Regiment as a 2nd Lieutenant from the Manchester University Contingent of the Officer Training Corps on 14 November 1914. He was promoted to temporary captain in September 1915. His medal card suggests he served in France and was awarded the Victory Medal and British War Medal.

His father (also a mosaic manufacturer in the family firm) served as a lieutenant in the London Regiment (Artists' Rifles) and died in 1916 having been gassed. Lehmann is buried in the Boulogne Eastern Cemetery (Grave ref VII. B. 11.).

Though the London Gazette records the recruitment of "Eric Newton Oppenheimer", and promotion of "Eric N. Oppenheimer", it was after the war that he formally changed his name from Oppenheimer to his mother's maiden name of Newton, the latter sounding less German. He married his first wife, Isabel Aileen Vinicombe on 29 November 1915 at the Church of St James, Birch in Rusholme. The couple divorced in 1934, after which Newton married the fashion designer Stella Mary Pearce. The couple moved to London, living at 3 Cumberland Gardens. Newton died in his London office in 1965.

== Publications ==
- The artist and His Public. Allen & Unwin. 1935. ASIN B00086F78Q.
- European Painting and Sculpture. Pelican Books. 1941. ASIN B0017903UA.
- War Through Artists Eyes'. John Murray. 1945. ASIN B0007ILK7M.
- An introduction to European painting. Longmans, Green. 1949. ASIN B0000CHR6W.
- The meaning of beauty. Whittlesey House. 1950.
- In My View. Longmans, Green. 1950. ASIN B00086F78Q.
- Tintoretto. Longmans, Green. 1952. ISBN 978-0-8371-4501-3.
- The Romantic Rebellion. Longman & Co. 1962. ASIN B0000CLJYB.
- The Arts of Man. 'The World of Art Library' series. Thames and Hudson. 1963.
- The Christian faith in art. Hodder & Stoughton. 1966. ISBN 978-0-340-02732-5. (with William Neil)
- The Diary of English Art Critic Eric Newton on a North American Lecture Tour in 1937. Edwin Mellen Press. 1997. ISBN 978-0-7734-8550-1. (with John Batts, Editor)

== Mosaic works ==
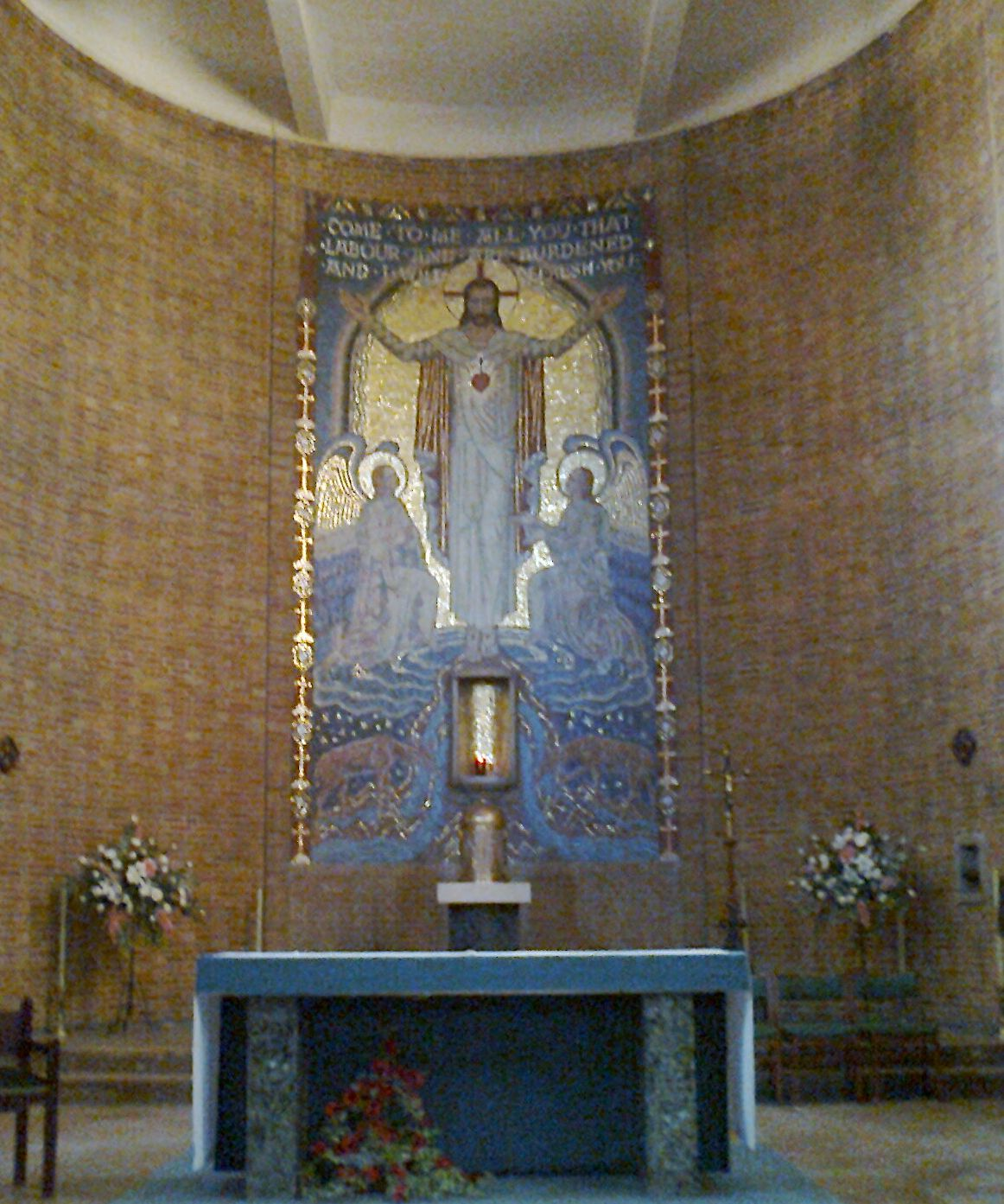
Eric Newton Mosaic in the apse of Sacred Heart, Hillsborough in Sheffield

- St John the Baptist, Rochdale. Sanctuary and Apse.
- Sacred Heart Church, Hillsborough. Apse and side-chapels
- Our Lady and St Edward, RC Church, Chiswick
- Our Lady and St Joseph Church, Heywood
- Honan Chapel, Cork
- Royal Hospital School Chapel, Holbrook
- Saint Colmcille's Church, East Belfast
