= Our Lady and St Joseph Church, Heywood =

Catholic church in Heywood, Rochdale, Greater Manchester

Church of Our Lady and St Joseph, Heywood
- Location within Greater Manchester
- 53.3530440°N 2.1313433°W
- OS grid reference: SD 85506 10607
- Location: Heywood, Rochdale, Greater Manchester
- Country: England
- Denomination: Catholic
- Website: www.catholicheywood.org.uk

History
- Former name: St Joseph’s Church
- Status: Parish Church
- Consecrated: 1913; 113 years ago

Architecture
- Functional status: Active
- Heritage designation: Grade II listed
- Architect: Henry Oswald Hill
- Style: Byzantine
- Years built: 1913–1916
- Completed: April 1916

Administration
- Province: Liverpool
- Diocese: Salford
- Deanery: St Therese of Lisieux

The Church of Our Lady and St Joseph, Heywood, is a Catholic church on Mary Street in Heywood, Greater Manchester, England and is a Grade II listed building.

== History of the Parish ==
Catholics in Heywood had to travel to Rochdale for Mass and the sacraments until 1854. In 1855, Fr. Arthur Stanislaus McCann (d.1892) began by establishing a parish using a disused workshop near Rochdale Road as a chapel, before renting the Ragged School in George Street for use as a chapel and school. A year later, building began in Dawson Street of a church, school and presbytery. St Joseph's Church was opened by Bishop Turner on Sunday 5 October 1856.

With a growing population, discussions began about building a bigger church after the appointment of one of McCann's successors, Fr. Cornelius William Poole (d.1916), in 1898. Fr. Poole struggled to raise funds for building a new church for many years but a site on the north side of Mary Street was found. On 13 October 1913, the foundation stone was laid by Bishop Casartelli and the new St Joseph's Church was finished and opened in April 1916. In 1962, the parish of St Joseph, Heywood was subdivided to create a new parish of Our Lady and St Paul. In 2011, these two parishes were merged to form the current parish of Our Lady and St Joseph.

== Building ==
The Romanesque and Byzantine style church and presbytery are Grade II listed buildings. They were designed by architect Henry Oswald Hill (1888–1917) who also designed other churches around Manchester such as St Teresa's Church in Irlam in 1900, St Brigid's Church in Bradford in 1901, St Alphonsus in Old Trafford in 1903, Our Lady and the English Martyrs Church in Urmston in 1911, and St John the Baptist Church, Rochdale in 1917. Hill was a captain in the Royal Flying Corp, serving in what later became No. 52 Squadron RAF, when he was killed in action during World War I.

Some further extensions were made to the original construction such as the baptistry, entrance porch and north transept that was added between 1929 and 1937, and an organ loft was added after 1969. The church's mosaics were made by artist Eric Newton (1893–1965) along with other artists in the workshops of the firm Ludwig Oppenheimer Ltd.

== See also ==
- Listed buildings in Heywood, Greater Manchester
