= Brownhill =

Suburb of Blackburn, Lancashire, England

Coordinates: 53.775°N 2.477°W

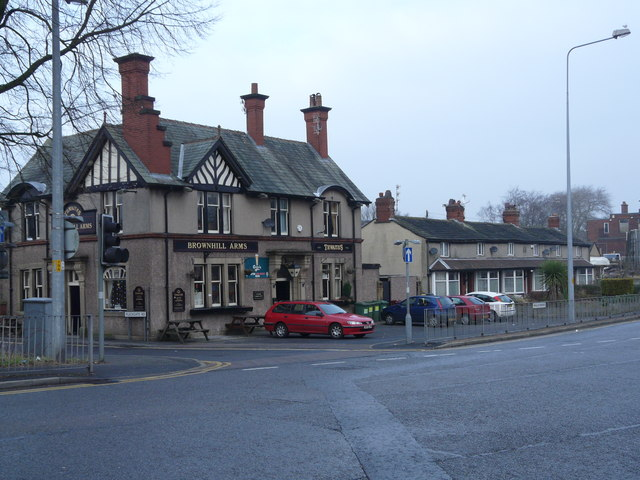
- Brownhill Arms

- Shown within Blackburn Shown within Blackburn with Darwen Location within Lancashire
- Population: 5,948
- OS grid reference: SD685310
- Unitary authority: Blackburn with Darwen
- Ceremonial county: Lancashire
- Region: North West
- Country: England
- Sovereign state: United Kingdom
- Post town: BLACKBURN
- Postcode district: BB1
- Dialling code: 01254
- Police: Lancashire
- Fire: Lancashire
- Ambulance: North West
- UK Parliament: Blackburn

Brownhill is a suburb of Blackburn, in the unitary borough of Blackburn with Darwen, in Lancashire, England. It is situated to the north-east of the town centre, in the Roe Lee ward which has an estimated population of 5,948. Other nearby places include Ramsgreave, Wilpshire and Sunnybower.

Brownhill sports a number of local businesses including Brownhill Pharmacy, Brownhill Post Office, Brownhill Arms (situated approximately 0.3 mi (0.48 km) from Ramsgreave and Wilpshire railway station) and Videorama.

In the centre of Brownhill is the junction of the A666 Whalley New Road and A6119 Blackburn Ring Road; when the ring road was built in the 1920s it was a roundabout with the Blackburn to Wilpshire tram route through the middle.

Brownhill has three churches: Holy Souls (Roman Catholic), St Gabriel's (Church of England) and Trinity (Congregational). St Gabriel's is located on Brownhill Drive, and was built in 1933 to replace the original St Gabriel's Church, which was situated on Pearl Street. St Gabriel's is now somewhat of a famous Blackburnian landmark due to its 'light-up' red cross, which was installed in 1964, can be seen as far away as Clayton-le-Moors (approximately 8 mi (13 km)).

The BP garage in Brownhill offers 24-hour fuel, off licence and grocery services.
