= 98th Heavy Anti-Aircraft Regiment, Royal Artillery =

98th HAA Regiment, RA 498 (Gloucestershire) HAA Regiment, RA
- Cap Badge of the Royal Artillery
- Active: 1 April 1939 – 30 August 1950
- Country: United Kingdom
- Branch: Territorial Army
- Role: Air defence
- Size: Regiment
- Part of: Anti-Aircraft Command; 21st Army Group
- Garrison/HQ: Cheltenham
- Engagements: Battle of Britain; Manchester Blitz; North West Europe

98th Heavy Anti-Aircraft Regiment, Royal Artillery, was an air defence unit of Britain's Territorial Army (TA) formed in Gloucestershire during the period of international tension leading up to the outbreak of World War II. It defended aircraft factories during the Battle of Britain, then the city of Manchester during the Blitz. It later served in the campaign in North West Europe. The regiment continued in the postwar TA until amalgamated in 1955.

== Origin ==
The Territorial Army was rapidly expanded following the Munich Crisis, particularly the Anti-Aircraft (AA) branch of the Royal Artillery (RA). 98th Heavy Anti-Aircraft Regiment, RA, (Note: Although it was not until 1 June 1940 that RA units manning 3-inch, 3.7-inch or 4.5-inch guns were officially designated as Heavy AA (HAA) regiments to distinguish them from the new Light (LAA) regiments appearing in the order of battle, 98th HAA Rgt referred to itself as such from the beginning.) was among the new units raised in the spring of 1939. It was formed with Regimental Headquarters (RHQ) and 300 HAA Battery at Cheltenham, and 301 HAA Battery at Moreton-in-Marsh. The Commanding Officer (CO), appointed on 1 April 1939, was Lieutenant-Colonel F. Longueville, DSO, MC, a retired former battalion commander in the Coldstream Guards. A number of TA officers came to the regiment from the established 76th (Gloucestershire) HAA Regiment at Bristol. The new regiment formed part of 46 AA Brigade in Anti-Aircraft Command's 5th AA Division.

== World War II ==
=== Mobilisation and Phoney War ===
In June, during the period of tension leading up to the outbreak of World War II, a partial mobilisation of AA Command's TA units was begun in a process known as 'couverture', whereby each unit did a month's tour of duty in rotation to man selected AA gun and searchlight positions. AA Command began to mobilise on 21 August, at which point 98th HAA Rgt had two old 3-inch guns for each battery and two modern 3.7-inch guns borrowed from 76th HAA Rgt for training (which had to be returned immediately). The guns were moved to their war stations at Bristol using hired lorries (which continually broke down). A detachment from 301 HAA Bty took up defence of the Bristol Aeroplane Company factory at RAF Filton on 31 August, equipped with 12 Lewis guns in case of low-level air attack. War was declared on 3 September.

Much redeployment took place during the Phoney War period. As early as 7 September, half of 301 HAA Bty was ordered away to Plymouth to reinforce 55 Light AA Bde, and on 10 September 5th AA Division concentrated guns to defend the port and chemical works at Avonmouth Docks. This included 300 HAA Bty, which redeployed with two guns from Charlton to Hallen Marsh. In October the heavy AA guns were redeployed again to protect the Bristol works at Filton, which meant 300 HAA Bty and its two guns returning to Charlton. The regiment was also asked to supply experienced officers to bring the Regular Army's 4th HAA Rgt up to full strength to go to France, (Note: Lieutenant Patrick Seely, formerly of 57th (Wessex) HAA Rgt, was one of 98th HAA Rgt's officers who volunteered for this.) and to form one of the new Light AA (LAA) regiments.

At the beginning of October RHQ moved from Cheltenham to Rudgeway and a month later it took over operational control of 439 Bty, 63rd (4th Bn Queen's) Searchlight Rgt, which had 24 Lewis gun teams deployed at Avonmouth Docks. In December and January the regiment received several hundred 'immatures' (recruits under the age of 19) from the Staffordshire Yeomanry, 150th Rgt Royal Horse Artillery, 66th and 67th Anti-Tank Rgts and 76th HAA Rgt. In mid-January 1940 98th and 76th HAA Rgts were ordered to form a cadre for a new operational battery. This was the first of several cadres supplied by the regiment over the next two years to form the basis of new batteries at the training regiments (see below). The cadre left for 211th HAA Training Rgt at Oswestry on 15 February 1940, where it formed 320 HAA Bty; this officially joined 98th HAA Rgt on 1 June, though it was initially posted to Littlehampton in West Sussex under 47 AA Bde.

By the new year the regiment still had just four 3-inch guns, at two gunsites, at Rockingham Farm and Cribbs Causeway, but had completed training at practice camps. In January the men of 300 HAA Bty were sent to relieve a battery of 56th (Cornwall) HAA Rgt at four 2-gun sites protecting the Royal Navy Cordite Factory, Holton Heath, in Dorset. In February part of 301 HAA Bty went to Southampton to relieve gun crews of 80th (Berkshire) HAA Rgt for a few days. During March drafts of men were received from the training regiments, together with a group of junior officers transferred from 54th (City of London) HAA Rgt.

=== Battle of Britain ===
The Phoney War ended on 10 May 1940 with the German invasion of the Low Countries. All leave was stopped and 301 HAA Bty was ordered to hand over its gunsites to 76th HAA Rgt and move immediately to take over sites protecting Southampton under 35 AA Bde. Ten days later the battery was moved to Weybridge to protect the Vickers and Hawker aircraft works at Brooklands under 47 AA Bde, manning eight mobile 3.7-inch guns. Meanwhile 231 HAA Bty from 74th (City of Glasgow) AA Rgt (a mobile 3.7-inch battery) arrived by rail at Gloucester to come under the command of 98th HAA Rgt. It deployed at two four-gun sites at Barnwood and Dean Farm to defend the Gloster Aircraft Company factory at Hucclecote. With its batteries scattered, RHQ 98th HAA Rgt was placed under 47 AA Bde to command several detached batteries. RHQ moved from Rudgeway to the Militia Camp at Fernhurst in West Sussex, which was closer to these units:

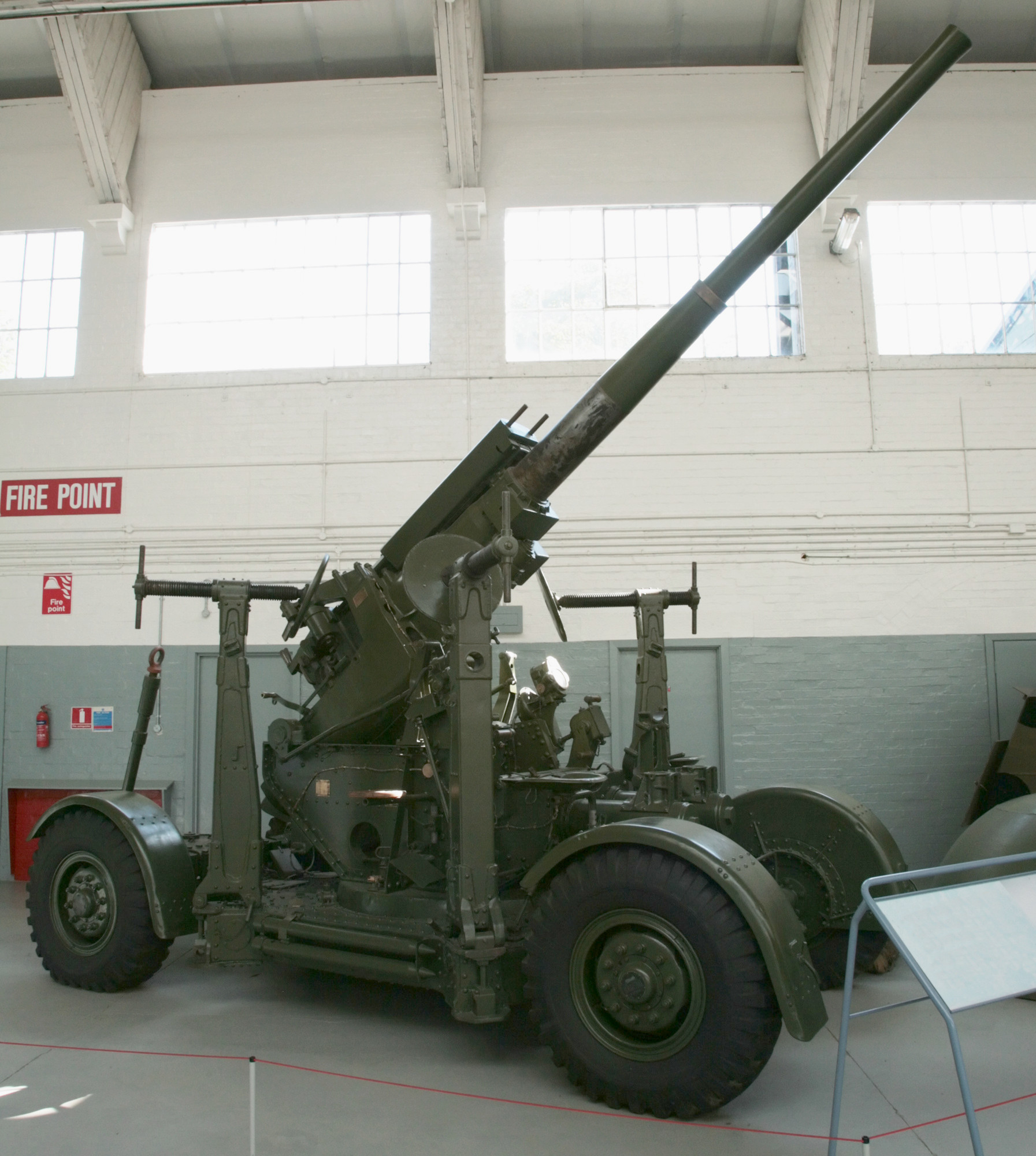
Mobile 3.7-inch HAA gun preserved at Imperial War Museum Duxford.

- 301/98 HAA Bty at Weybridge
- 237/76 HAA Bty at RAF Tangmere
- 284/90 HAA Bty at Littlehampton
- 249/80 HAA Bty at Bramley Ordnance Depot

While the Battle of Britain raged over South East England in August and September, the regiment was progressively concentrated round Weybridge:

- 300 HAA Bty HQ – RAF Tangmere from 4 June
  - 4 guns – RAF Tangmere
  - 4 x 3.7-inch guns – RAF Farnborough from 25 August
- 301 HAA Bty HQ – Addlestone from 27 June
  - 4 x 3.7-inch guns – Durnford Bridge
  - 4 x 3.7-inch guns – Woburn Park
- 320 HAA Bty HQ – Cobham from 27 June
  - 4 x 3.7-inch guns – Fairmile Common
  - 4 x 3.7-inch guns – Wisley Common
- 98th HAA Rgt Training Centre – Andover, Hampshire

At the beginning of September the Luftwaffe shifted its attention away from RAF Fighter Command's airfields and radar stations and began attacking targets nearer London. The Vickers works at Brooklands was badly bombed on 4 September (and a lone raider attacked the Hawker works on 21 September). As a result, the defences were reorganised on 9 September, with Lt-Col Longueville being appointed AA Defence Commander (AADC), Weybridge, moving RHQ to nearby Cobham. On 26 September Lt-Col Longueville returned to Gloucestershire to take command of the newly raised 45th LAA Rgt, and Lt-Col F. Dearden from 47th LAA Rgt assumed command of 98th HAA Rgt on 28 September.

=== Manchester Blitz ===
After its defeat in the Battle of Britain in September the Luftwaffe concentrated on night bombing of London and other cities (The Blitz). On 15 November RHQ 98th HA Rgt moved to the Bristol area, then on 24 November it moved with 300 and 320 HAA Btys to Manchester, where it came under the command of 44 AA Bde in 4th AA Division. 301 HAA Battery HQ (BHQ) moved to Manchester with the regiment, although its two Troops were at Plymouth and Bristol, and did not rejoin the regiment at Manchester until 28 January 1941. The regiment was deployed as follows:

4 AA Divisional sign.

- RHQ – Cavendish House, Ellesmere Park, Eccles
- 300 HAA Bty
  - BHQ + Gun station D (4 x 3.7-inch) – Littlemoss, Droylsden
  - Gun station A (4 x 3.7-inch) – Heaton Park, Prestwich
- 310 HAA Bty HQ – Wilbraham Road, Manchester
- 320 HAA Bty
  - BHQ + Gun station K (4 x 3.7-inch) – Ellesmere Park, Eccles
  - Gun station G (4 x 3.7-inch) – Longford Park, Stretford

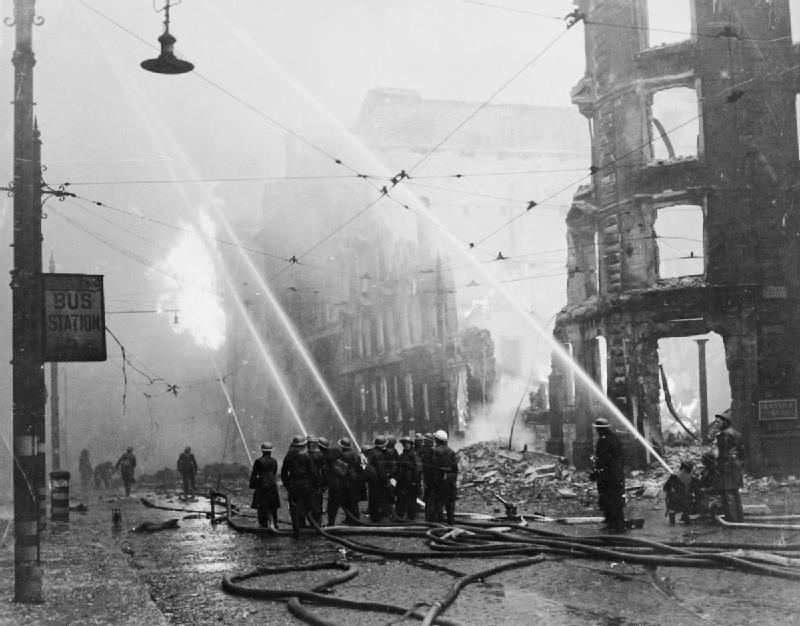
Firefighters putting out a blaze at a bomb site in Manchester city centre

On the night of 21/22 November the Manchester guns engaged raiders on their way to and from Liverpool, and on the following two nights it was Manchester's turn to be hit (the Manchester Blitz). Raids on Manchester peaked at Christmas. The Royal Artillery's historian considered that during these attacks on British cities 'the actions fought [by the AA batteries] were as violent, dangerous and prolonged as any in the field'. At this point the HAA guns were firing virtually blind at night, unless a sound detector or searchlight managed to pick up a target. However, some examples of Gun-laying Mk I radar began to arrive for the HAA batteries.

Lt-Col Dearden moved to command 8th (Belfast) HAA Rgt on 26 December and was succeeded on 29 January 1941 by Maj M.A. Pyke, MC, from 54th (City of London) HAA Rgt, who was promoted to Lt-Col. In January, 301 HAA Bty moved to Royal Oak, Wythenshawe, where its newly arrived troops took over Gun stations Y and Z. On 10 March 1941 399 HAA Bty joined 98th HAA Rgt from 210th HAA Training Rgt at Blandford Camp (the cadre for this battery had been provided by 70th (3rd West Lancashire) HAA Rgt). 399 HAA Battery HQ was established at Waterloo Road, Blackpool, taking over two gunsites (D at Accrington and E at Blackpool) from 115th HAA Rgt. There was a final flare-up of Luftwaffe attacks in the Manchester area in May 1941, particularly on 8 May when oil facilities at Barton Bridge were bombed, and one bomb caused a large crater only 50 yds from K Site's Command Post.

=== Mid-War ===
The Blitz is generally held to have ended on 16 May 1941, though there were still sharp raids on Manchester and Merseyside on the nights of 1/2 and 25/26 June respectively. With the end of the Blitz, the regiment was able to carry out training with the improved equipment arriving. By now the HAA sites had the advantage of GL Mk I* radar with an elevation finding (E/F or 'Effie') attachment to supplement searchlights, and some of the gunsites replaced 3.7-inch with 4.5-inch guns. 399 HAA Battery was reinforced by 25 other ranks transferred from the Royal Welch Fusiliers on 25 June and three days later established a new C Site at Audenshaw with four mobile 3.7-inch guns. The regiment maintained the same deployment in and around Manchester until August 1941, when 399 HAA Bty was moved into Manchester itself. In November the regiment redeployed in North Manchester.

By this stage of the war, experienced units were being posted away to train for service overseas. In January 1942 the regiment received a number of AEC Matador gun tractors and drivers, which led to rumours that it was to mobilise for service, which were soon confirmed. Regimental HQ for 151st (Mixed) HAA Rgt began to assemble alongside the regiment, and huts for the Auxiliary Territorial Service women assigned to this 'Mixed' regiment were erected. (Note: 'Mixed' units were those in which women from the Auxiliary Territorial Service (ATS) were integrated; in the case of HAA batteries they provided approximately two-thirds of the personnel.) In March, RHQ moved to Devisdale Camp, near Altrincham where Troops of 98th HAA Rgt began mobile training in March as they were relieved by 151st HAA Rgt.

In late April 1942 the Luftwaffe began a new series of raids targeting open towns and cities, the so-called Baedeker Blitz. On 29 April the regiment moved south, towing its mobile 3.7-inch guns, which were deployed to defend Andover, Salisbury and Winchester, with RHQ at Nether Wallop in Hampshire. It now came under 64 AA Bde in 8th AA Division. During May the regiment was officially mobilised, receiving a large draft of drivers, and transferring men of lower medical categories into 399 HAA Bty, which moved from Salisbury to Sherborne and was attached to 140th HAA Rgt before eventually joining 118th HAA Rgt on 10 July. The remainder of the regiment, now on the three-battery establishment for overseas service, underwent physical and mobile training. On 1 August Lt-Col Pyke (a veteran of World War I) transferred to command 140th HAA Rgt and was succeeded by the younger Lt-Col J. Cave-Bigley. In August and September he whole regiment underwent a month's battle training at Berechurch Hall Camp, Colchester, followed by a month's mobile training at Leigh-on-Sea. In November some of its guns went to Scotland for combined training, whole other parties went for field gunnery training.

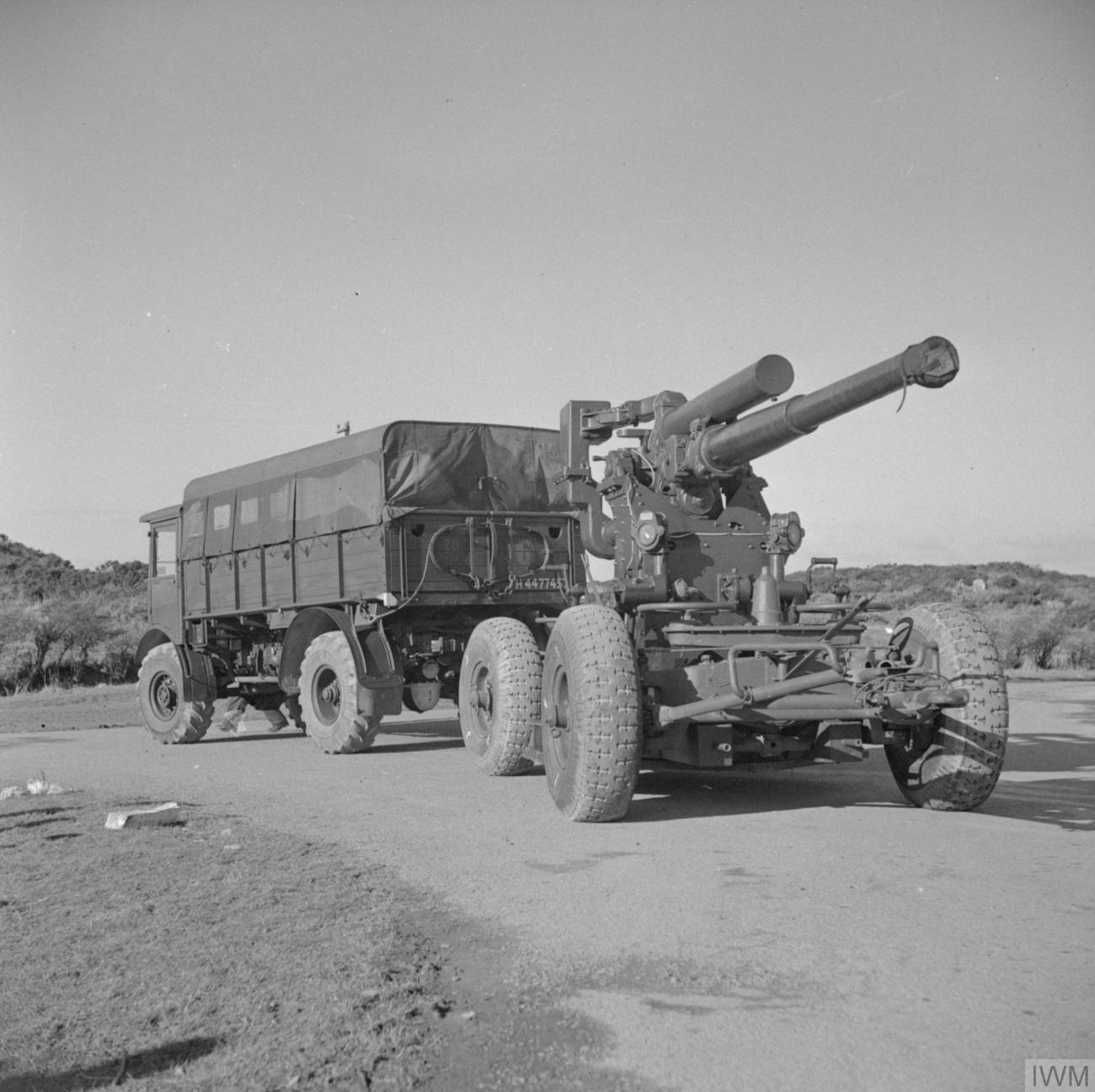
AEC Matador artillery tractor towing a 3.7-inch anti-aircraft gun at Burrow Head in Scotland, 18 February 1944.

The regiment left AA Command and was now based at Cleethorpes under Northern Command as part of the GHQ Reserve. In December it was joined by its signal section of the Royal Corps of Signals (RCS) and workshop section of the Royal Electrical and Mechanical Engineers (REME), giving it the following organisation:

- RHQ
- 300, 301, 320 HAA Btys
- 98 HAA Rgt Signal Section, RCS
- 1506 HAA Rgt Section, Royal Army Service Corps (RASC)
- 98 HAA Rgt Workshop Section, REME

In January 1943, the whole regiment moved to Coupar Angus in Scotland, from where it spent two weeks in February at 2nd HAA Training and Practice Camp at Burrow Head. It moved to Broughty Ferry in late April, then after another training period at Redesdale Practice Camp to Wollaton Park in Nottinghamshire (later at Carburton Camp). Here it joined 101 AA Bde in 21st Army Group training for the planned invasion of Normandy (Operation Overlord). From now on moves to training areas were treated as movement exercises, though as a semi-mobile unit it was only able to move half its guns at a time and was dependent on railway or army transport to move most of the personnel.

It was normal for the AA units in 21st Army Group to be loaned back to AA Command when they were not undergoing training, and on 1 August 98th HAA Rgt took over operational gunsites from 118th HAA Rgt in Kent, with RHQ at Margate. 300 HAA Battery was assigned to Canterbury to cover troop concentrations for 21st Army Group's Exercise Harlequin. The other two batteries engaged a few lone raiders, including one that attacked at zero feet and was fired on with AA Light machine guns. The regiment was relieved on 24 August and moved to Norwich and Lincoln to take over sites from 197th HAA Rgt, then returned to its old location at Carburton Camp by 10 September. However, the whole of 101 AA Bde was now moved to Kent, so the regiment went back, now stationed at Cliftonville. Here it engaged in some practice coastal shooting at targets of Ramsgate. (Note: During this period two officers and 18 other ranks applied to transfer to the Glider Pilot Regiment.) After another exercise in the Whitby area, the regiment moved at the end of the year to Southend-on-Sea under 75 AA Bde, another 21st Army Group formation. Training and exercises continued during the early months of 1944.

=== North West Europe ===
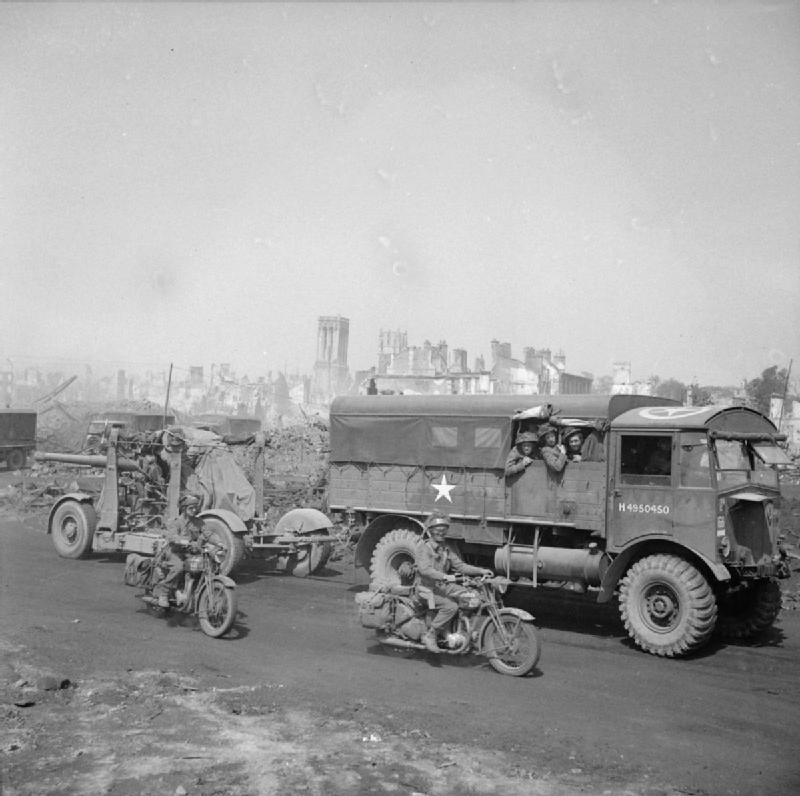
A Matador tows a 3.7-inch HAA gun through the ruins of Caen, August 194.

75 AA Brigade and its units were follow-up forces for Operation Overlord, and remained in the UK after D Day, not crossing to Normandy until 21st Army Group broke out of its constricted beachhead in late August. After landing on 29 August the brigade took over AA defence of Caen, releasing the units there to join Second Army's pursuit of the defeated Germans after the Battle of Falaise. On 17 September 75 AA Bde including 98th HAA Rgt was moved up from Normandy to take on AA and coast defence at Ostend supporting First Canadian Army. There was no enemy air activity, but there were attacks by E-boats against shipping in the anchorage, which were countered by fire from AA guns. Given the lack of Luftwaffe activity the AA allocation to Ostend was too generous, and on 31 October the regiment moved to Tirlemont, south-east of Brussels.

Once 21st Army Group captured Brussels and Antwerp, these cities had become targets for V-1 flying bombs (codenamed 'Divers') launched from within Germany, and anti-Diver or 'X' defences had to be established. The initial Brussels X Defences were under 101 AA Bde, which 98th HAA Rgt rejoined. AA Command's experience against V-1s launched at England during the summer had shown that the power-operated, remotely controlled Mk IIC 3.7-inch gun, with automatic fuze-setting, SCR-584 radar and Predictor No 10 (the all-electric Bell Labs AAA Computer) were required to deal effectively with V-1s, but 21st Army Group's mobile HAA units did not have experience with this equipment and were at a disadvantage. As more static guns arrived, part of 98th HAA Rgt moved on 19 November to the area of Goes in South Beveland where the Battle of Walcheren had just ended. On 28 November the regiment was transferred to 76 AA Bde controlling the 'Scheldt North' defences. The area was badly flooded and conditions at the gun positions were terrible.

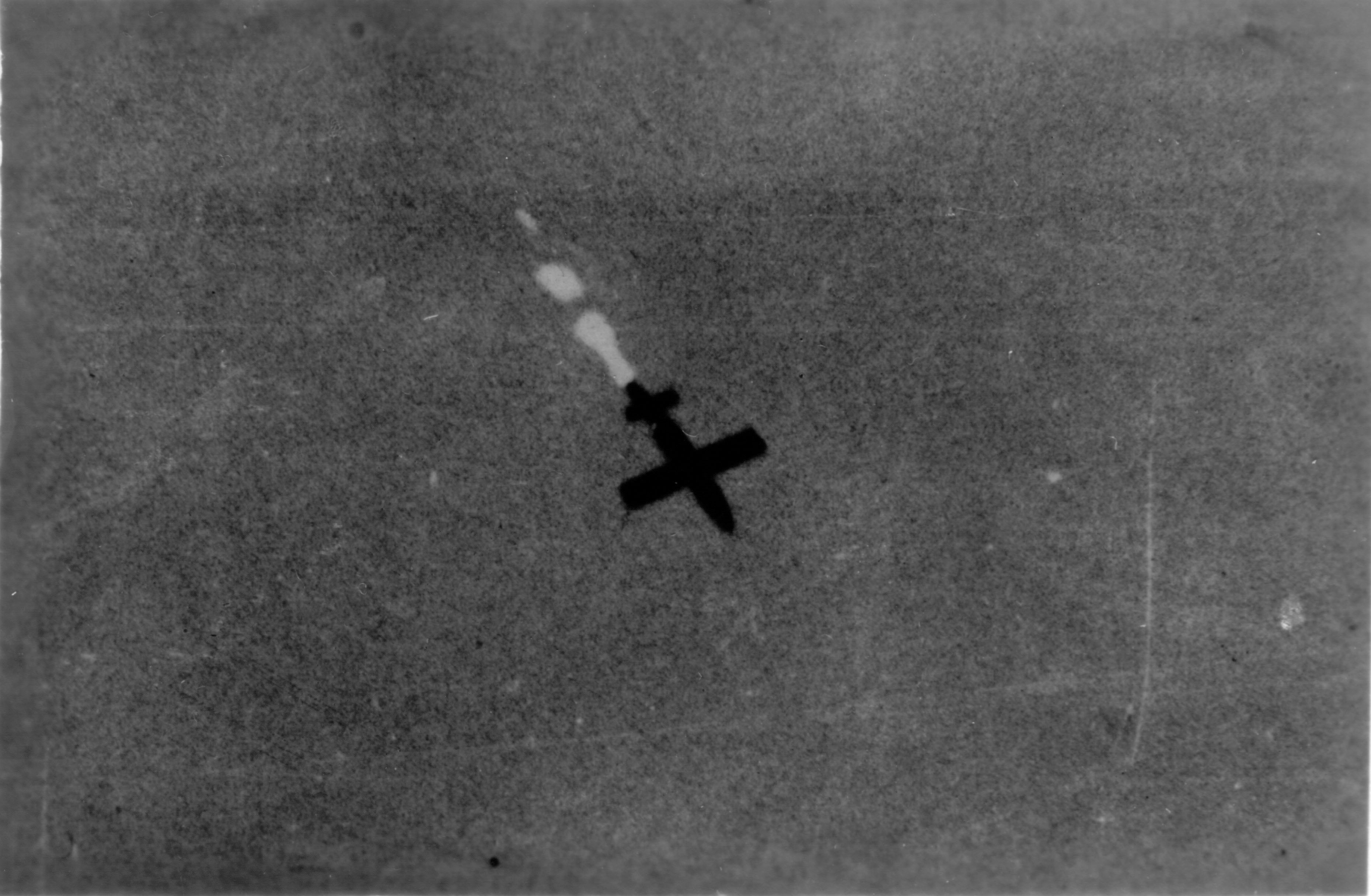
V-1 in flight over Antwerp

On 19 December, 98th HAA Rgt was transferred to the US 50th AA Artillery Brigade to assist in the Antwerp X Diver defence belt. Then, when the Germans began their offensive in the Ardennes in December 1944 (the Battle of the Bulge) and briefly threatened to break through to Antwerp, 80th AA Bde (which was operating the early warning radar system for the Antwerp X Defences) was warned on 20 December to prepare to convert into an Army Group Royal Artillery (AGRA) at short notice. (Note: AGRAs were groups of (usually) medium and heavy artillery held at Corps level.) If necessary, the brigade would take over 98th and 99th HAA Rgts to operate in the medium artillery role supporting 11th Armoured Division and 3rd AGRA. The brigade would also be responsible for the ground defence of the approaches to Tirlemont, taking anti-paratroop measures. Despite concerted attacks on nearby airfields by Luftwaffe fighters on 1 January (Operation Bodenplatte), the ground situation was well under control and the AGRA and local defence plans were cancelled on that day.

The regiment was now back under 76 AA Bde. 300 HAA Bty was at Goes, with B Troop deployed in the AA role, but had to send A Troop to North Beveland to operate in the ground role. The move was difficult and eventually required rafting the guns on a section of Bailey bridge supported on two Dutch barges. On 17/18 January the troop fired predicted concentrations against ground targets in support of an attack by No. 4 Commando on Zierikzee. On 21 January the whole regiment was ordered to concentrate on South Beveland, where the batteries already in position provided bridges, huts and bivouacs for the main body moving in from Tirlemont.

Much of the early part of 1945 was taken up with unit training to use the new SCR-584 radar and No 10 Predictors. By March 1945 Luftwaffe activity was negligible and AA units were being employed for other duties. 98th HAA Regiment formed a gun tractor platoon on 15 March to assist the Royal Engineers in moving equipment of the Rhine crossing (Operation Plunder). By late April 1945 98th HAA Rgt was awaiting re-employment. It was converted into garrison troops, and deployed along the coast opposite German-occupied Friesland under 31 AA Bde. After VE Day it remained in British Army of the Rhine (BAOR) in Germany. The regiment and its three batteries were placed in suspended animation in BAOR on 11 April 1946.

=== Cadres ===
Between 1940 and 1942, 98th HAA Rgt provided the following cadres to form new batteries. A cadre typically comprised a battery commander-designate, up to 6 other officers and up to 36 other ranks.

- 320 HAA Bty: cadre from 76th and 98th HAA Rgts transferred to 211th HAA Training Rgt at Oswestry on 15 February 1940, where it formed 320 HAA Bty on 1 May; this was regimented with 98th HAA Rgt on 1 June.
- 405 HAA Bty (Cadre No 97) formed at 205th HAA Training Rgt at Arborfield 16 January 1941, later joined 95th HAA Rgt.
- 467 (Mixed) HAA Bty (Cadre No 151), formed at 211th HAA Training Rgt at Oswestry on 7 August 1941, later joined 135th (Mixed) HAA Rgt.
- 517 (Mixed) HAA Bty, formed at 205th HAA Training Rgt at Arborfield on 13 January 1942, later joined 136th (Mixed) HAA Rgt
- 553 (Mixed) HAA Bty (Cadre No 235A), ordered to 7th HAA Training Rgt at Oswestry on 26 March 1942 but cancelled next day and battery never formed.
- 560 (Mixed) HAA Bty (Cadre No 235A), formed at 206th HAA Training Rgt at Arborfield on 30 April 1942, later joined 154th (Mixed) HAA Rgt.

== Postwar ==
When the TA was reconstituted on 1 January 1947 the regiment was reformed at Cheltenham as 498 (Gloucestershire) HAA Rgt. (Note: On 1 April 1947 a new 98th HAA Rgt was formed in the Regular Army by the redesignation of the war-formed 161st (M) HAA Rgt, but it only had a short existence.) It formed part of 72 AA Bde (the prewar 46 AA Bde). However, the new regiment was short-lived: on 30 August 1950 it was amalgamated into 312 (Wessex) Medium Rgt to form 312 HAA (Gloucestershire) HAA Rgt at Bristol, with 498 HAA providing P and R Btys. In 1955 this regiment in turn amalgamated with two other HAA units to form 311 (City of Bristol) HAA Rgt.
