= Lostock High School =

Location
- Selby Road; Stretford, Greater Manchester, M32 9PL; England; 53°27′17″N 2°19′49″W

Information
- Type: Community school
- Religious affiliation: Church of England
- Local authority: Trafford
- Department for Education URN: 106365 Tables
- Ofsted: Reports
- Interim Headteacher: Claire Reynolds
- Gender: Coeducational
- Age: 11 to 16
- Enrolment: 522
- Capacity: 740
- Website: http://www.lostock.trafford.sch.uk

Lostock High School (previously known as Lostock College) is a mixed, 11-16 secondary modern school in Stretford, Greater Manchester, England. The school has a capacity of 740 and currently enrols 522 students.

== History ==
From 2010 to 2013, there were plans to merge Lostock College (as it was then known) with Stretford High School to create a new academy. These plans faced significant opposition from parents at both schools as well as students at Lostock.

As of January 2021, Lostock was "supported by Stretford High School" with executive headteacher Mrs Nicola Doward overseeing both schools. In 2012, Lostock High School was criticised by Nick Pickles of Big Brother Watch for having four CCTV cameras located in children's toilets.

In 2018 and again in 2019, Lostock High School was included on a list of schools released by the government detailing schools which had failed to meet government minimum standards. It was subsequently branded one of "England's worst schools" by the Daily Mirror.

In 2020, 13-year-old Lostock High School pupil Tamia Riley, who is mixed-race, launched a petition calling for retailers to have 'more variety and skin tones in nude undergarments'. Riley received support from her school for her campaign and was the subject of local and national media attention, appearing on the BBC's children's news programme Newsround.

== Facilities ==
The school previously had specialist status as an Arts College, and funds were used for a new Music Suite with ICT support and a digital recording suite. A successful lottery bid was used to renovate and relaunch the community arts theatre, and build a new dance studio used by both the school and the community.

== Notable former pupils ==
- Tony Vaughan, former professional football player
- Darren John Langford, Spencer in Hollyoaks
- Leon Anwar, Dominic in Coronation Street
- John Browne, guitarist from progressive metal band Monuments (metal band)
- Lyndsey Marshal, actress
