= Listed buildings in Stretford =

Stretford is a town in the Metropolitan Borough of Trafford, Greater Manchester, England. The town contains 20 listed buildings that are recorded in the National Heritage List for England. All the listed buildings are designated at Grade II, the lowest of the three grades, which is applied to "buildings of national importance and special interest". The town is adjacent to the centre of Manchester, and is partly residential and partly industrial. The Bridgewater Canal and the Manchester Ship Canal run through the town, and there are listed buildings associated with both canals. The other listed buildings include two medieval structures, churches, the entrances to a former botanical garden and to a park, a factory, civic buildings, a former cinema, a hotel, and three war memorials.

== Buildings ==
| Name and location | Photograph | Date | Notes |
|---|---|---|---|
| Cross base 53.44408°N 2.31103°W | | Medieval (possible) | The cross base was later used as the base for a sundial. It is in stone, with a cubic shape, and contains the remains of a sundial shaft. On one side is an inscription. |
| Great Stone; 53.45662°N 2.29609°W | — | Medieval (possible) | A boulder-shaped stone in gritstone moved from nearby to the entrance of Gorse Hill Park. There are two sockets on the top, and it is thought to have been a cross base. |
| Brindley's Weir; 53.46920°N 2.26904°W | — | Mid-18th century | A culvert basin and drain sump designed by James Brindley to carry Corn Brook under the Bridgewater Canal. It consists of a pear-shaped basin about 25 metres (82 ft) long surrounded by sandstone walls, with a circular sump, about 5 metres (16 ft) in diameter, in the centre. |
| Aqueduct over Hawthorn Road; 53.44059°N 2.30754°W | | c. 1776 | The aqueduct carries the Bridgewater Canal over Hawthorn Road, for which the engineers were James Brindley and John Gilbert. It is in brick, and consists of three segmental arches, one over the road, and the others over an overflow channel from the River Mersey. The arches have a keystone and a band, and between the overflow channels is a triangular cutwater. |
| Aqueduct over the River Mersey; 53.43665°N 2.30894°W | | c. 1776 | The aqueduct carries the Bridgewater Canal over the River Mersey, for which the engineers were James Brindley and John Gilbert. It is in brick and stone, and consists of a single segmental arch. The aqueduct has bands, the east parapet is in brick with stone coping, and the west parapet has been rebuilt in brick, concrete and steel. |
| Former entrance and lodges, White City; 53.46245°N 2.28378°W | | 1828 | White City was originally a botanical garden and later a greyhound racing track. The former entrance portal and the façades of the flanking lodges are in ashlar stone, and are in Greek Ionic style. There is a central vehicle entrance with a semicircular arch and a keystone, flanked by lower flat-headed pedestrian entrances. Outside these are the fronts of two-storey lodges with a sash window in each floor. Across the front are eight unfluted Ionic columns, and across the top is an entablature. The gates are in cast iron. |
| St Matthew's Church; 53.44396°N 2.31042°W | | 1841–42 | A Commissioners' church in Gothic Revival style that was later extended. It is in brick with stone dressings, and has a slate roof with coped gables. The church consists of a nave, a chancel with north and south vestries, and a west tower. The tower has four stages, angled buttresses, a west door, stepped lancet windows, a clock face with a gablet on the east side, and an embattled parapet with octagonal corner pinnacles. |
| Gorse Hill Park entrance 53.45647°N 2.29607°W | | Mid-19th century | The portal and flanking lodges are in ashlar stone, and are in Classical style. There is a central round-arched vehicle entrance, and two smaller round-arched pedestrian entrances. The main arch has a scrolled keystone, coffered soffits, flanking Corinthian columns, and a dentilled and modillioned entablature. Outside the arches are single-storey lodges that are canted at the front and have sash windows. The gates are in cast iron and are decorated with vine and grape motifs. The structure was formerly the entrance to Trafford Hall. |
| St Ann's Church; 53.44832°N 2.30393°W | | 1862–67 | A Roman Catholic church designed by E. W. Pugin, it is in stone with a slate roof. The church consists of a nave with a clerestory, north and south aisle passages, a polygonal apse at the east end, and a northwest steeple. The steeple has a tower with three stages, a north door, thin lancet windows, quatrefoil windows, corner pinnacles, and a spire with lucarnes. At the west end is a rose window containing a carved crucifix, and there is a carved medallion depicting the donor of the church, Sir Humphrey de Trafford and his wife, kneeling and holding a model of the church. |
| St Ann's Presbytery; 53.44841°N 2.30354°W | | 1862–67 | The presbytery was designed by E. W. Pugin in Gothic Revival style. It is in stone on a projecting plinth, with bands, and has a slate roof with coped gables. There are two storeys and three bays, the left bay being a cross-wing. In the middle bay is a porch and a door with a fanlight. To the left is a canted bay window, there is a gabled dormer in the right bay, and the windows are sashes. |
| Union Baptist Church; 53.44507°N 2.29727°W | | 1867 | A Baptist church, later used for other purposes, it is in brick with a stone front, and is in Classical style with Baroque features. It has a front of three bays and sides of five bays. The front has a rusticated plinth, and a central doorway flanked by pairs of ¾ Corinthian columns carrying an open pediment containing a round-headed window. In the outer bays are windows with impost bands and apron panels. Along the sides are arched windows. |
| Stretford Public Hall; 53.44649°N 2.30692°W | | 1879 | Built by John and Enriquetta Rylands, originally a public hall with lecture rooms and the town’s first free lending library, later used for other purposes, it is in brick with stone dressings and a slate roof, and is in Gothic Revival style. The building has two storeys and a front of nine bays. The central bay projects forward, it contains a doorway with a moulded arch, and rises to form a tower that has a balcony with a cast iron parapet, clock faces, a machicolated frieze, and a steep pyramidal roof. The windows are sashes, those on the upper floor with balconies, and to the right is a three-bay dormer. At the top is a parapet and corner pinnacles. From 1910 the building was owned by the local authority and since a community asset transfer in 2015 the building is now owned and operated by the Friends of Stretford Public Hall. |
| Trafford Road Bridge; 53.46567°N 2.28416°W | | c. 1894 | A swing bridge carrying the northbound lanes of Trafford Road (A5063) over the Manchester Ship Canal. It is in wrought iron with abutments in brick and stone. The bridge is constructed with lattice girders by the roadway joined at the top by smaller lattice girders. The bridge pivots on a turntable at the north end. |
| Essence Factory; 53.46567°N 2.26815°W | | 1896 | The former factory is in brick with dressings and detailing in terracotta and roofs in Welsh slate and tile. It has an L-shaped plan and an almost symmetrical front of twelve bays. It has four storeys, five-storey towers flanking the central bay and at the ends, and a two-storey bay at the extreme right. The central doorway has a round head and is flanked by polygonal attached columns with urns. In the towers are two-storey oriel windows, and elsewhere are mullioned windows, most also with transoms, some with round heads and others with flat heads. Along the top is a parapet and pinnacles. |
| Trafford Park Hotel; 53.46708°N 2.30978°W | | 1902 | The hotel is in red brick on a plinth, with terracotta dressings, quoins, bands, a panelled parapet, and a roof of 20th-century concrete tiles, and it is in Renaissance style. There are three storeys, a front of three bays, and eight bays on the sides. The central round-headed doorway has paired Ionic pilasters, and at the top of the bay is a clock tower flanked by scrolls, with a modillion cornice and a swept lead roof. The outer bays contain three-storey canted bay windows surmounted by cartouches, and at the top are shaped gables with moulded finials. There are similar features on the right side, together with a cartouche and a shaped gable each containing the name of the hotel. |
| Trafford Park war memorial 53.46673°N 2.31100°W | | c. 1920 | The war memorial was moved to its present site outside St Anthony's Church in about 1982. It consists of a granite Celtic cross decorated with interlace and with a hemispherical boss in the centre. It stands on a tapering plinth, on a square base on two steps. There is an inscription on the front of the plinth, the names of those lost in the First World War are on the sides and on the base, and the names of those lost in the Second World War are on a rectangular stone on the lower step. |
| War memorial outside All Saints' Church; 53.45297°N 2.32102°W | | c. 1920 | The war memorial to the northwest of All Saints' Church is in stone. It has an octagonal step, and an octagonal plinth, on which stands a cross with an octagonal shaft with a moulded foot. On the face of the cross is a figure of Christ carved in relief. On the plinth is an inscription and the names of those lost in the First World War. |
| Stretford war memorial 53.45665°N 2.29657°W | | 1923 | The war memorial is in stone and consists of a carved lion on a tall square tapering shaft on a base and a stylobate. On the front is a carved wreath, and on the sides are inscriptions with coats of arms. |
| Trafford Town Hall; 53.45847°N 2.28732°W | | 1933 | The town hall, which was extended in 1983, was designed by Bradshaw Gass & Hope. It is in Ruabon brick on a steel frame and has a gritstone plinth, gritstone dressings, and a mansard roof with slate below and plastic above. The town hall has two storeys, attics and basements, and has an irregular courtyard plan. The front range is symmetrical, the central three bays projecting forward and containing a portico with columns and pillars carrying a balcony with a parapet. Above this is a stair window with a round head and a triangular pediment. Recessed at the top is a clock tower with latticed windows, parapets with corner urns, clock faces, and a cap with chamfered corners. Flanking the centre are seven bays on each side, containing sash windows. The end bays are angled and have concave fronts. |
| The Top Rank Club (former Essoldo Cinema); 53.44633°N 2.30607°W | | 1936 | Originally a cinema, later used for other purposes, it is in brick with a front in faience tiles, and is in Art Deco style. The front facing Chester Road has stepped convex surfaces, the central rib projecting and formerly carrying the name of the cinema. The side entrance on Edge Lane has an inwardly curving wall with a curved canopy and a tall concrete pier. |
