= Stretford process =

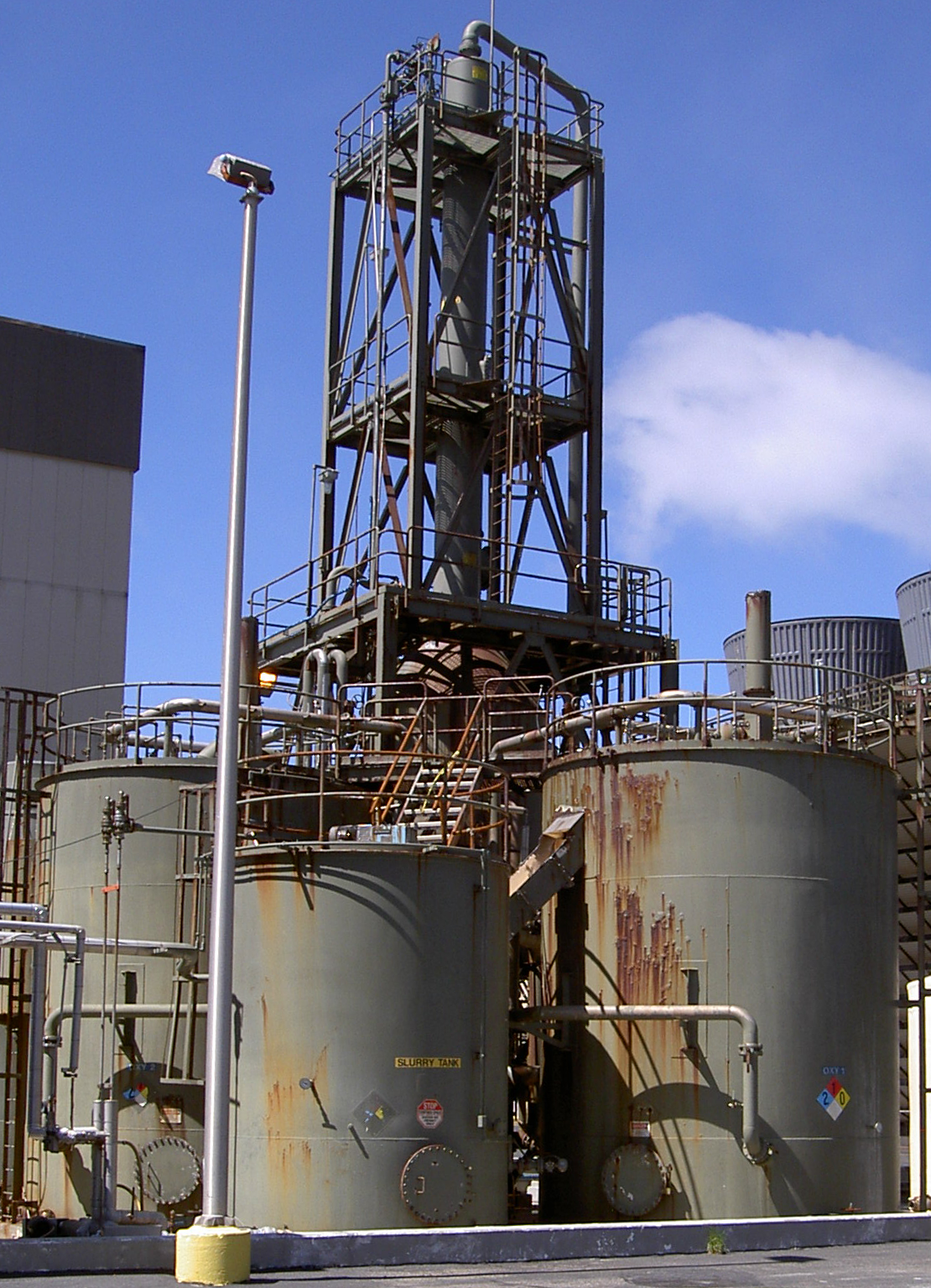
A small Stretford reactor for scrubbing H_{2}S from geothermal steam

The Stretford process was developed during the late 1950s to remove hydrogen sulfide (H_{2}S) from town gas. It was the first liquid phase, oxidation process for converting H_{2}S into sulfur to gain widespread commercial acceptance. Developed by Tom Nicklin (Note: Nicklin had previously developed a process for improving the conversion of coal to coal gas, known as the Rochdale process.) of the North Western Gas Board (NWGB) and the Clayton Aniline Company, in Manchester, England, the name of the process was derived from the location of the NWGB's laboratories, in Stretford.

The process uses reduction-oxidation (redox) chemistry to oxidise the H_{2}S into elemental sulfur, in an alkaline solution containing vanadium as an oxygen carrier.

The process earned the NWGB a Queen's Award to Industry in 1968. Although it was used in the gas industry for only a relatively short time, the process was licensed by the NWGB and used successfully in a variety of industries worldwide. (Note: The North Western Gas Board became part of British Gas in 1973, as a result of the Gas Act 1972.) At the height of its popularity during the 1970s, there were more than a dozen companies offering the Stretford technology. By 1987, about 170 Stretford plants had been built worldwide, and more than 100 were still operating in 1992, capable of removing 400,000 tons of sulfur per year. The first US plant was commissioned in 1971 at Long Beach, California, to process the gas from offshore oil wells.

== See also ==
- Sour gas
- Hydrodesulfurization
