= St Ann's, Stretford =

Church in Trafford, Greater Manchester, England

Coordinates: 53.4484°N 2.3038°W

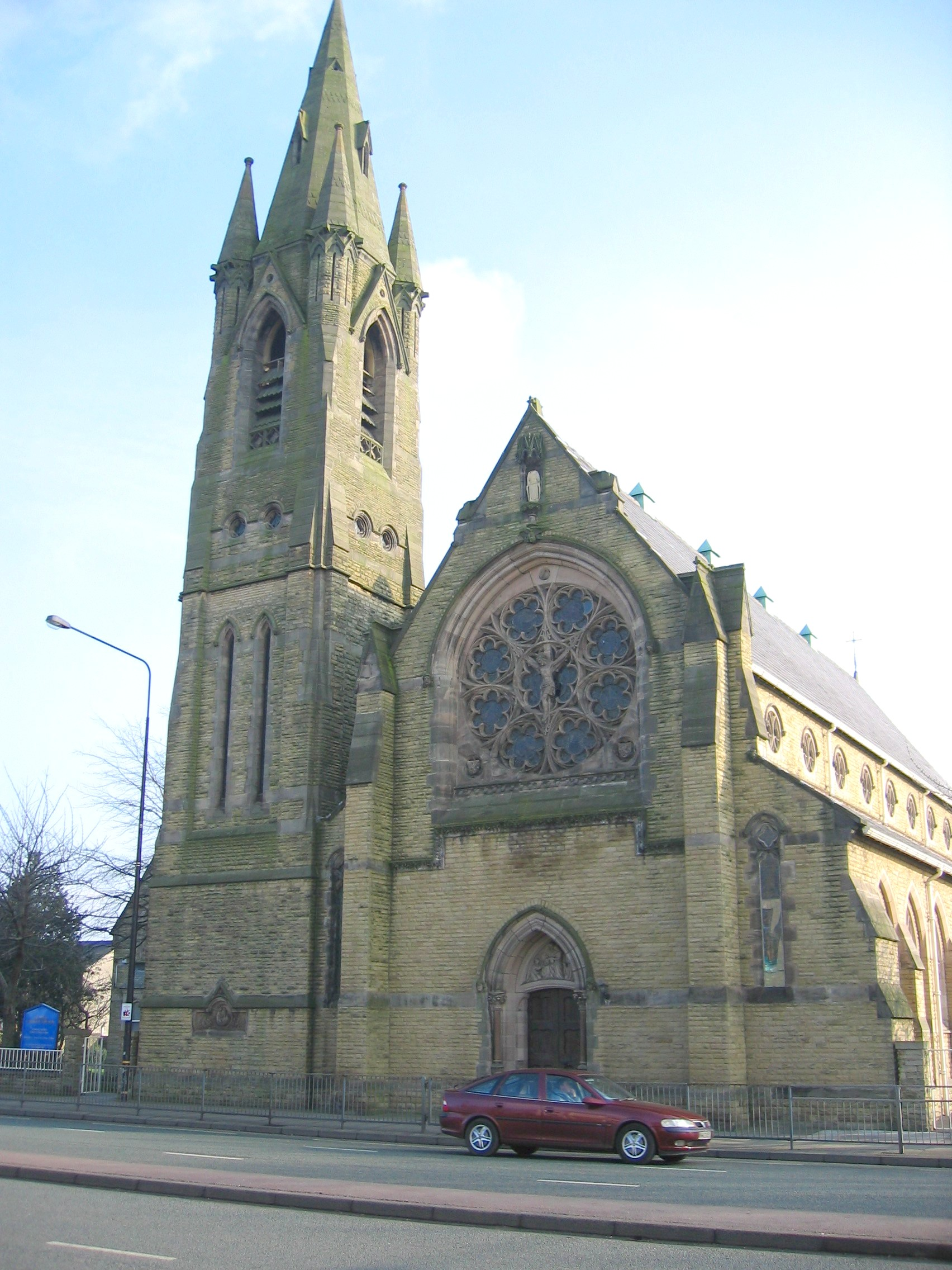
St Ann's Church

St Ann's Church, Stretford is a Grade II listed Roman Catholic church in Stretford, Greater Manchester, England. It was constructed between 1862 and 1863, on the east side of the A56 Chester Road. The parish functions under the jurisdiction of the Roman Catholic Diocese of Salford.

== Origins ==
The St Ann's Mission was founded in 1859 in a small chapel on Herbert Street, Stretford. It initially served as a chapel-of-ease to All Saints, Barton until 1862 after which it became chapel-of-ease to St Francis, Gorton and was served by the Franciscan Fathers.

== Construction ==
The church was designed by E. W. Pugin in the Gothic Revival style for Sir Humphrey de Trafford who commissioned the church as wedding anniversary present for his wife Lady Annette. The contractor was Mr Glaistor of Liverpool, Hardman & Co. of Birmingham made the windows and brasswork and Richard Lockwood Boulton of Worcester was stonemason. The church was opened on 22 November 1863 by Bishop William Turner.

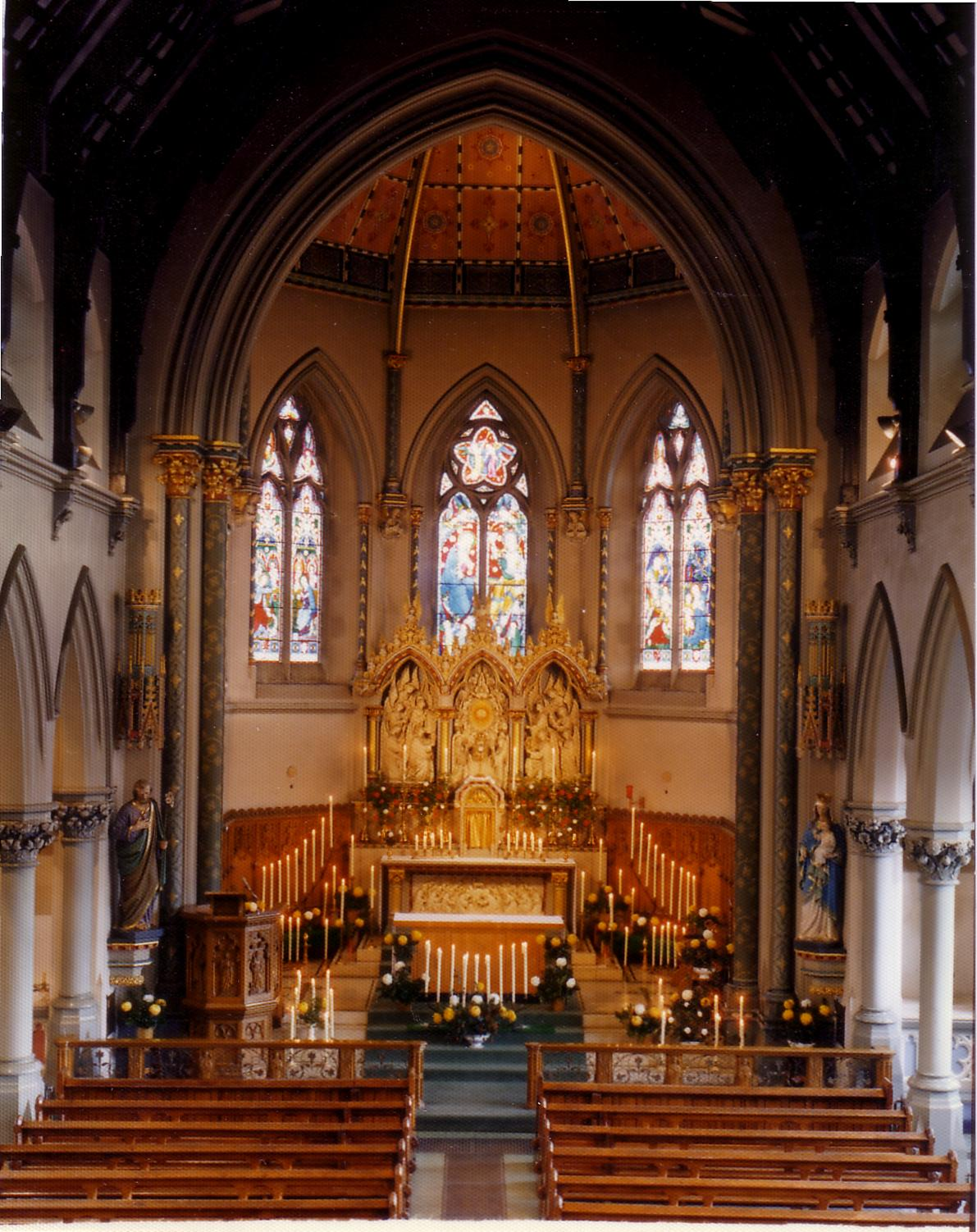
View of interior

The presbytery and sacristy were completed in 1865 and the church was consecrated by Bishop William Turner on 18 June 1867. The following year the church organ was installed by FW Jardine of Manchester.

== Later alterations ==
During 1893 and 1894 the church was refurbished and redecorated. JA Pippet of Hardman & Co. of Birmingham painted a series of murals throughout the church depicting the various stages of the life of St Ann.

In the 1930s, the church was modernised with new oak fittings including a pulpit, altar rails, font, and panelling on the sanctuary. Work was interrupted by the outbreak of the Second World War, during which St Ann's was damaged by incendiary bombs in the blitz.

In the 1960s, the church was extensively modernised in preparation for the centenary. Then, following the Second Vatican Council, work began in the 1970s to modernise the sanctuary for the new liturgy; the high altar, pulpit and later the altar rails were all removed.

== See also ==
- Listed buildings in Stretford
