= David Shawcross =

English footballer

Personal information
- Full name: Francis David Shawcross
- Date of birth: 3 July 1941
- Place of birth: Stretford, Manchester, England
- Date of death: 7 November 2015 (aged 74)
- Place of death: Hazel Grove, Greater Manchester, England
- Position: Wing half

Senior career*
Years	Team	Apps	(Gls)
1958–1965	Manchester City	47	(2)
1965–1967	Stockport County	60	(14)
1967–1970	Halifax Town	132	(21)
1971–1972	Drogheda United	18	(2)
1972	Altrincham		
1972–1973	Macclesfield Town	11	(0)
Total		239	(37)
- * Club domestic league appearances and goals

Francis David Shawcross (3 July 1941 – 7 November 2015) was an English footballer who played as a wing half in the Football League for Halifax Town, Stockport County and Manchester City.
