= Longford Cinema =

Building in Stretford, Manchester, England

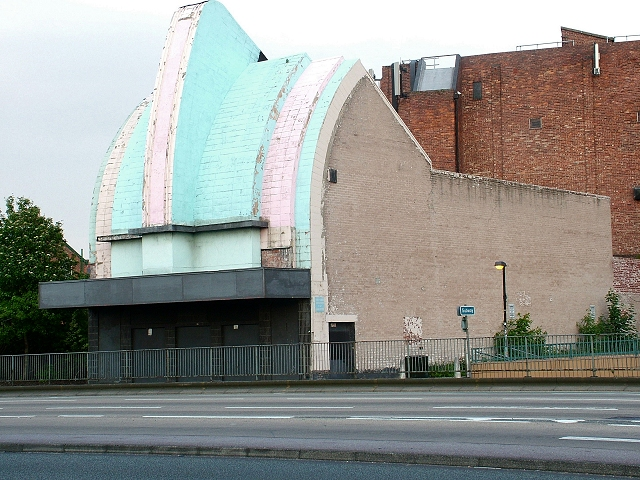
- Longford Cinema, May 2007

- Location within Greater Manchester
- Former names: Lucky 7, The Top Rank Club, The Essoldo Cinema
- Alternative names: Rank Bingo

General information
- Status: Closed
- Architectural style: Art Deco
- Location: 1122A Chester Road, Stretford, Manchester, M32 0HA, Stretford, Great Britain
- Coordinates: 53°26′46.7″N 2°18′21.9″W
- Elevation: 29.1 m (95 ft)
- Opened: 12 October 1936; 89 years ago
- Closed: c. December 1995

Design and construction
- Architect: Henry Elder
- Architecture firm: Roberts, Wood and Elder
- Developer: Jackson and Newport
- Main contractor: Normantons Ltd

Website
- longfordcinema.co.uk

Longford Cinema is a former cinema in Stretford, Manchester. It is also known as The Longford Essoldo, The Top Rank Club, and "The Cash Register".

Designed by the architect Henry Elder, it was the height of Art Deco fashion when it was opened by the Mayor of Stretford on 12 October 1936. The unusual "cash register" shaped frontage was intended to symbolise the business aspect of show business. The Longford's debut feature was Tudor Rose starring Nova Pilbeam.

The building incorporated many modern features, such as sound-proofing and under-seat heating, and it was also the first cinema in Britain to make use of concealed neon lighting. It had a seating capacity of 1,400 in the stalls and 600 in the circle, with a further 146 seats in the café area. The foyer featured large murals by Frederick Harry Baines depicting contemporary cinema scenes. When built, the cinema had a short pedestrian approach to the facade, but this was removed when the A56 was widened.

During the Second World War the building was used for concerts, including one given by a young Julie Andrews. It also played host to the Hallé Orchestra after the orchestra's own home, the Free Trade Hall, was bombed and severely damaged during the Manchester Blitz of 1940. The orchestra performed twelve concerts at the cinema in the 1942–3 season and more under Barbirolli the following season.

After a change of ownership in 1950, the cinema was renamed the Stretford Essoldo. It continued to operate as a cinema until 1965, when it was converted into a bingo hall, which it remained until its closure in 1995. The building was purchased by a new owner in January 1997 but has remained unused since then. It was designated a Grade II listed building in 1994.
