= Trafford Town Hall =

Municipal building in Trafford, Greater Manchester, England

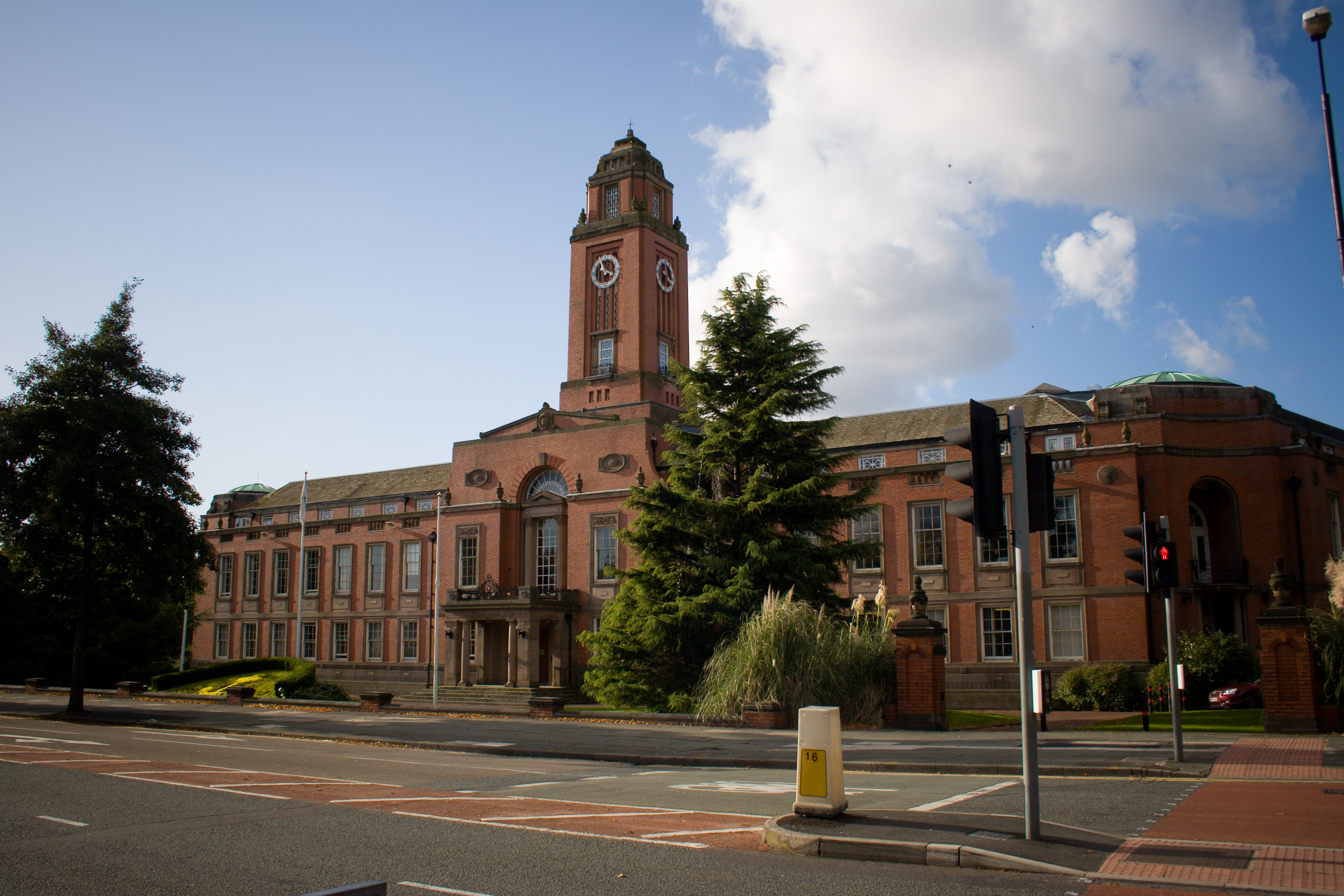
- Interactive map of the Trafford Town Hall area
- Former names: Stretford Town Hall

General information
- Status: Grade II Listed Building
- Type: Town Hall
- Architectural style: Neo-Classical
- Classification

Listed Building – Grade II
- Designated: 27 March 2007
- Reference no.: 1391923
- Location: Talbot Rd, Stretford, Manchester M32 0TH, England
- Coordinates: 53.4587°N 2.2876°W
- Current tenants: Trafford Borough Council
- Construction started: 21 August 1931
- Inaugurated: 16 September 1933; 92 years ago
- Cost: £88,000 (equivalent of £5,888,578 as of 2018)
- Owner: Trafford Council

Design and construction
- Architect: Bradshaw Gass & Hope

Website
- https://www.trafford.gov.uk

Trafford Town Hall is a neo-classical building in Stretford, Trafford, Greater Manchester, England. It is the meeting place of Trafford Council and was originally known as "Stretford Town Hall". The building faces Emirates Old Trafford to the south and is within 500 metres of Manchester United's Football Ground to the north.

== History ==
Before the construction of the town hall, the forerunner authority, Stretford Urban District Council, held its meetings in the District Council Offices on Talbot Road in Old Trafford (subsequently known as Trafford Public Hall and now known as the Trafford Hall Hotel).

The building now known as Trafford Town Hall stands on a large previously undeveloped site at the junction of Talbot Road and Warwick Road in Stretford, England. It was designed by architects Bradshaw Gass & Hope of Bolton on behalf of Stretford Municipal Borough, and built by the main contractor Edwin Marshall & Sons. Work began on 21 August 1931, funded by a government grant of £88,000 (equivalent to £6.4 million (Note: United Kingdom Gross Domestic Product deflator figures follow the MeasuringWorth "consistent series" supplied in Thomas, Ryland; Williamson, Samuel H. (2024), "What Was the U.K. GDP Then?", MeasuringWorth) in 2023); the building was officially opened as Stretford Town Hall on the granting of Stretford's charter on 16 September 1933.

The steel-framed building has two stories plus basement and attic floors, with a mansard roof. Set in landscaped grounds with a sunken garden, it is constructed of brick in Flemish bond with pink Darley Dale gritstone dressings. It originally consisted of a main front with a wing on each side, until a rear extension was added between the wings in 1983, enclosing an inner courtyard. (It was originally envisaged that the space behind might be used for a public hall, with seating for 1,500 people.) The building was constructed with a portico with a doric order column and a pillar on either side and a wrought-iron parapet with a circle motif above. The design also included a 108-foot (33 m) clock tower which rises in stages; the clocks throughout the building (including the four dials on the tower) were controlled by a Synchronome master clock. Inside the building, on either side of the central staircase are bronze statues, one of Electra, who was one of the 3,000 Oceanids, and the other of Njörðr, who was the God of wind and sea. The main room on the first floor was the council chamber, overlooking the inner courtyard, which had panelled walls and a domed ceiling. An adjacent suite of committee rooms, similarly panelled, had sliding partitions which could be thrown open to create a small hall "capable of seating upwards of 250 people".

In 1974, on the formation of the Metropolitan Borough of Trafford, the new council adopted the town hall as its base, renaming it Trafford Town Hall. It was renovated in the early 1980s, in a schedule of work that included the addition of a 10,000-square-metre (110,000 sq ft) underground nuclear fall-out shelter; the shelter was subsequently used for storage until its closure in 2011. Trafford Town Hall was designated a Grade II listed building in 2007.

In 2011, the 1983 extension was demolished, and the 1933 original building refurbished, with new offices added. The refurbishment works, which were intended to create an open-plan environment, were designed by 5plus Architects and undertaken by Shepherd Developments. The new buildings were opened in 2013.

== See also ==
- Listed buildings in Stretford
