= Stretford High School =

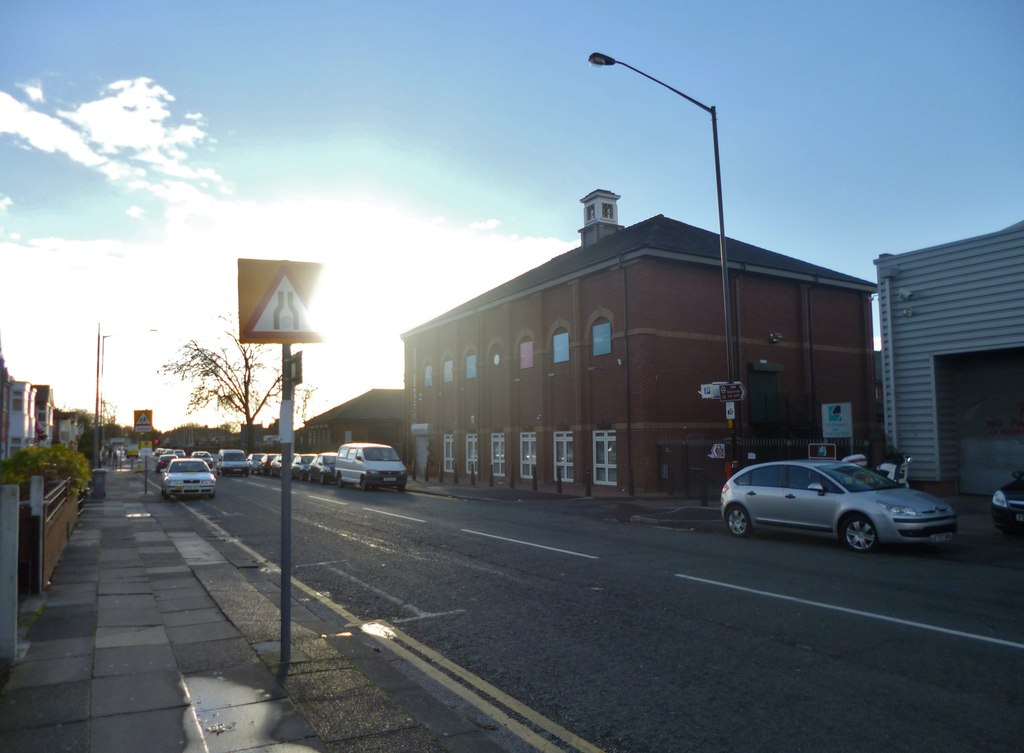

Location
- Great Stone Road; Stretford, Greater Manchester, M32 0XA; England; 53°27′26″N 2°17′36″W

Information
- Type: Foundation secondary school
- Established: 1990
- Local authority: Trafford
- Department for Education URN: 106370 Tables
- Ofsted: Reports
- Headteacher: Hamza Khaliq
- Gender: Mixed
- Age: 11 to 16
- Enrolment: 979
- Houses: Royce, Pankhurst, Turing and Bronte
- Website: stretfordhigh.com

Stretford High School is a mixed, non-selective secondary school in Stretford, in the borough of Trafford, Greater Manchester, England. It teaches pupils aged 11 to 16 and opened in 1990. After being placed in special measures in 2004, the school's performance improved, and Ofsted rated it "Good" at its 2019 inspection. The school has partnerships with the Manchester United Foundation and Lancashire Cricket.

== History ==
Stretford High School opened in 1990 on the Great Stone Road site previously occupied by Stretford Grammar School for Boys. That school had merged with Stretford Grammar School for Girls in 1986 to form Stretford Grammar School, which moved to the former girls' school.

The school was placed in special measures in 2004 after poor examination results and behavioural problems. Writing in The Guardian in 2009, Ally Fogg described a subsequent recovery under headteacher Derek Davies, by which the school gained an Ofsted "outstanding" rating and a high placing in the contextual value-added league tables.

On 8 July 2011, pupils unveiled blue plaques to Tommy Taylor and Duncan Edwards alongside Bobby Charlton and Dickie Bird. The two footballers were among the Busby Babes who lived locally and died in the Munich air disaster of 1958.

In March 2020, the school closed temporarily after several staff began to self-isolate during the early stage of the COVID-19 pandemic in the United Kingdom.

== Admissions ==
The school is non-selective and admits pupils from across the north of Trafford. It has 979 pupils on roll.

== Academic performance ==
In the 2010 examinations, 45% of pupils gained five or more A*–C grades including English and mathematics, 80% gained five or more A*–C grades, and all gained a Level 2 qualification.

Ofsted rated the school "Good" at its 2019 inspection.
