= Longford Park =

Park in Greater Manchester, England

Coordinates: 53°26′50.9″N 2°17′28.9″W

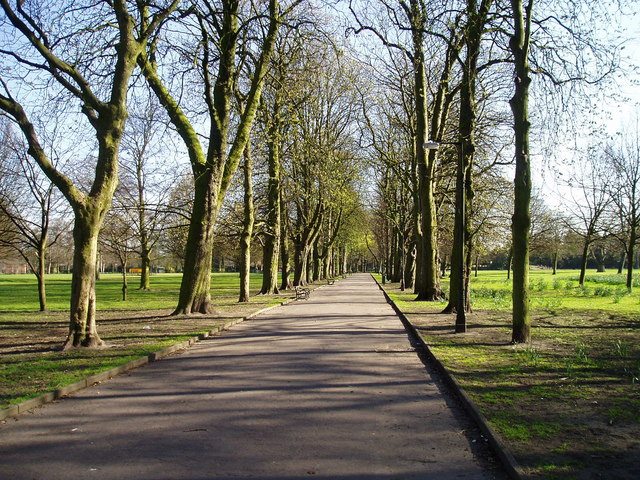
- Tree-lined avenue in Longford Park
- Interactive map of Longford Park
- Type: Public
- Location: Stretford, Greater Manchester
- Nearest city: Manchester
- Area: 22 hectares (54 acres)
- Created: 1912
- Operator: Trafford Metropolitan Borough
- Awards: Green Flag

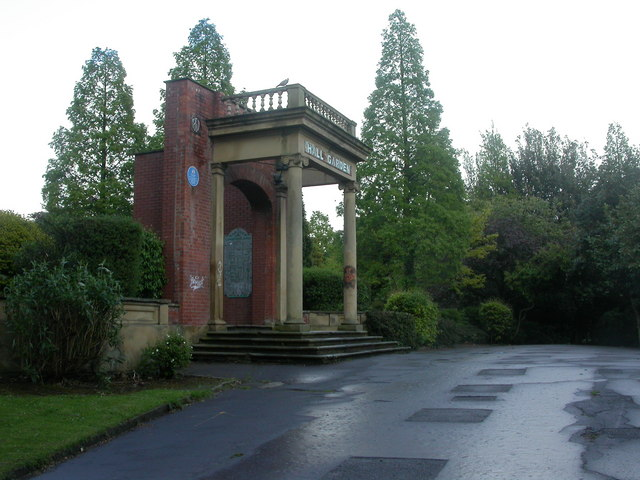
The front porch of Longford Hall

Longford Park is a public park in Stretford, Greater Manchester. It is in the east of the town and spans an area of 22 ha, making it the largest park in Trafford.

Attractions include a pets' corner, a wildlife garden, bowling greens, tennis and basketball courts, a play area for children, a Scout group, disc golf course, and an athletics stadium. It was the site of a royal garden party in 1977, the Silver Jubilee of Elizabeth II. As the Manchester–Stretford border ran across the park until the Boundary Commission moved it in 1987, part of it (including Stretford Stadium) was in Chorlton-cum-Hardy, although it was always administered by Trafford Council.

== History ==
Longford Park was the home of industrialist John Rylands, industrialist and philanthropist from 1855 until his death in 1888 and of his widow Enriqueta Augustina Rylands until her death in 1908. The house Rylands constructed in the park in 1857, Longford Hall, was demolished in 1995. It replaced an earlier house of the same name that had been the residence of cotton merchant Thomas Walker (died 1817) and subsequently of his sons Thomas (died 1836) and Charles. Today only the front porch, coach house, and the stable buildings remain. The estate and hall were sold to Stretford Council in 1911 after a poll of ratepayers, and the park was opened to the public the following year.

1st Stretford (Longford) Scout Group, who are one of the oldest Scout Groups in the UK, are based within the Shippon Complex which they call the Ranche.

Longford Park is the home of Stretford parkrun; a free, weekly 5k running event.

== Sources ==
- Masterson, Vicki; Cliff, Karen (2002), Stretford: An Illustrated History, Breedon Books Publishing, ISBN 978-1-85983-321-6
- Parkinson-Bailey, John J. (2000). Manchester: An Architectural History. Manchester: Manchester University Press. ISBN 0-7190-5606-3.
