= Stretford =

Town in Greater Manchester, England

- Town
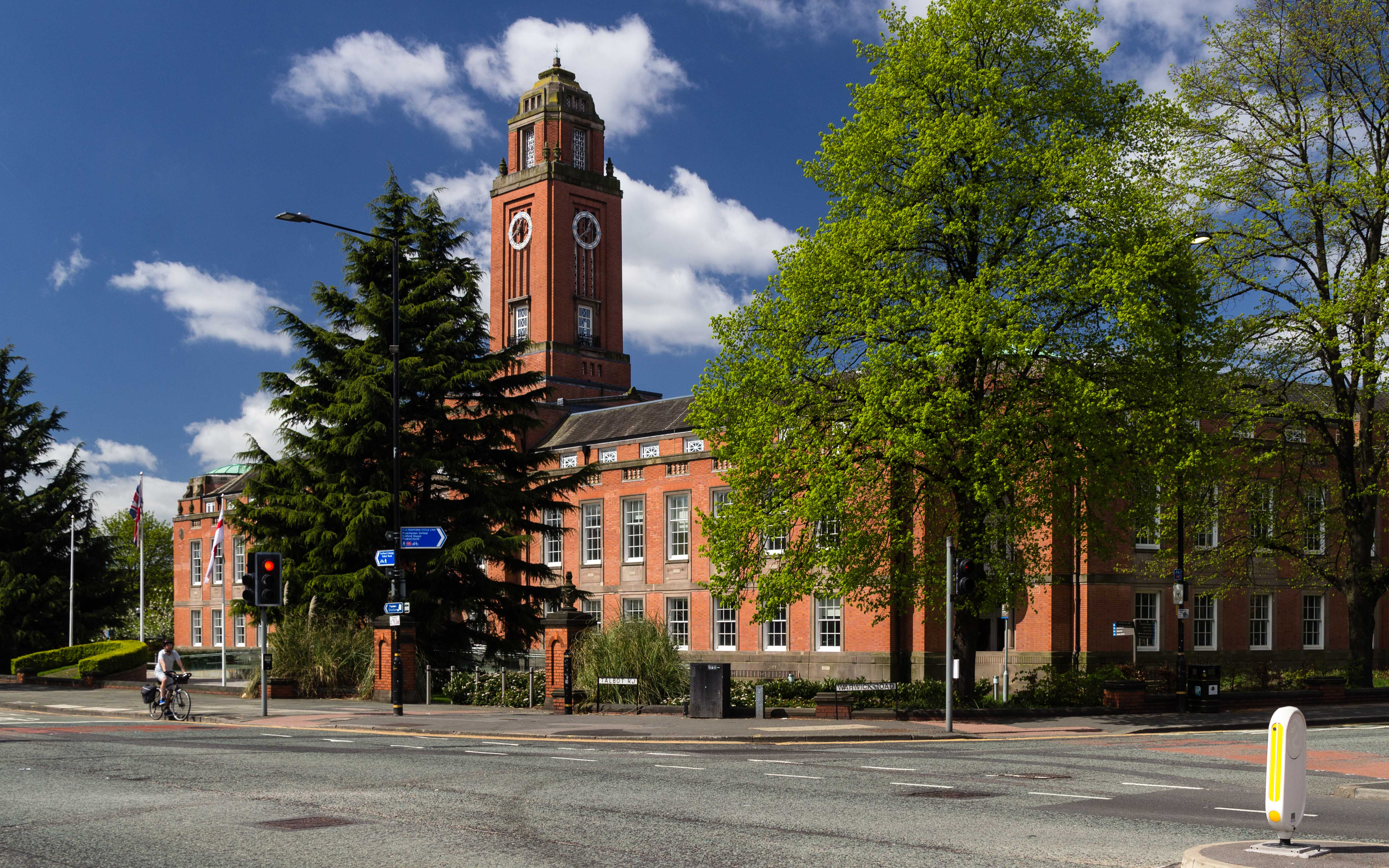
- Trafford Town Hall in Stretford

- Location within Greater Manchester
- Population: 46,910 (2011 Census)
  - Density: 9,158/sq mi (3,536/km^{2})
- OS grid reference: SJ795945
  - London: 163 mi (262 km) SSE
- Metropolitan borough: Trafford
- Metropolitan county: Greater Manchester
- Region: North West
- Country: England
- Sovereign state: United Kingdom
- Post town: MANCHESTER
- Postcode district: M15, M16, M17, M32
- Dialling code: 0161
- Police: Greater Manchester
- Fire: Greater Manchester
- Ambulance: North West
- UK Parliament: Stretford and Urmston

Stretford is a market town in Trafford, in Greater Manchester, England, sited on flat ground between the River Mersey and the Manchester Ship Canal; the Bridgewater Canal bisects the town. The town is located 4 miles (6.4 km) south of central Manchester, 3 miles (4.8 km) south of Salford and 4 miles (6.4 km) north-east of Altrincham. Stretford borders Chorlton-cum-Hardy to the east, Moss Side and Whalley Range to the south-east, Hulme to the north-east, Urmston to the west, Salford to the north and Sale to the south. In 2011 it had a population of 46,910.

Within the boundaries of the historic county of Lancashire, Stretford was an agricultural village in the 19th century; it was known locally as Porkhampton, due to the large number of pigs produced for the Manchester market. It was also an extensive market-gardening area, producing more than 500 long tons (508 t) of vegetables each week for sale in Manchester by 1845. The arrival of the Manchester Ship Canal in 1894, and the subsequent development of the Trafford Park industrial estate, accelerated the industrialisation that had begun in the late 19th century. By 2001, less than one per cent of Stretford's population was employed in agriculture.

Stretford has been the home of Manchester United Football Club since 1910 and of Lancashire County Cricket Club since 1864. Notable residents have included the industrialist, philanthropist and Manchester's first multi-millionaire John Rylands, the suffragette Emmeline Pankhurst, the painter L. S. Lowry, Smiths singer Morrissey, Joy Division singer Ian Curtis, Bee Gees member Andy Gibb and Jay Kay of Jamiroquai.

== History ==
The origin of the name Stretford is "street" (Old English strǣt) on a ford across the River Mersey. The principal road through Stretford, the A56 Chester Road, follows the line of the old Roman road from Deva Victrix (Chester) to Mamucium (Manchester), crossing the Mersey into Stretford at Crossford Bridge, built at the location of the ancient ford.

The earliest evidence of human occupation around Stretford comes from Neolithic stone axes found in the area, dating from about 2000 BC. Stretford was part of the land occupied by the Celtic Brigantes tribe before and during the Roman occupation, and lay on their border with the Cornovii on the southern side of the Mersey. By 1212, there were two manors in the area now called Stretford. The land in the south, close to the River Mersey, was held by Hamon de Mascy, while the land in the north, closer to the River Irwell, was held by Henry de Trafford. In about 1250, a later Hamon de Mascy gave the Stretford manor to his daughter, Margery. She in turn, in about 1260, granted Stretford to Richard de Trafford at a rent of one penny. The de Mascy family shortly afterwards released all rights to their lands in Stretford to Henry de Trafford, the Trafford family thus acquiring the whole of Stretford, since when the two manors descended together.

The de Trafford family leased out large parts of the land, much of it to tenants who farmed at subsistence levels. Although there is known to have been a papermill operating in 1765, the area remained largely rural until the early 20th-century development of Trafford Park in the Old Trafford district north of the town. Until then Stretford "remained in the background of daily life in England", except for a brief cameo role during the Jacobite rising of 1745, when Crossford Bridge was destroyed to prevent a crossing by Bonnie Prince Charlie's army during its abortive advance on London; the bridge was quickly rebuilt.

Until the 1820s one of Stretford's main cottage industries was the hand-weaving of cotton. There were reported at one time to have been 302 handlooms operating in Stretford, providing employment for 780 workers, but by 1826 only four were still in use, as the mechanised cotton mills of nearby Manchester replaced handlooms. As Manchester continued to grow, it offered a good and easily accessible market for Stretford's agricultural products, in particular rhubarb, once known locally as Stretford beef. By 1836 market gardening had become so extensive around Stretford that one writer described it as the "garden of Lancashire"; in 1845 more than 500 tons of vegetables were being produced for the Manchester market each week. Stretford also became well known for its pig market and the production of black puddings, leading to the village being given the nickname of Porkhampton. A local dish, known as Stretford goose, was made from pork stuffed with sage and onions. During the 1830s, between 800 and 1,000 pigs a week were being slaughtered for the Manchester market.

Situated on the border with Manchester, Stretford became a fashionable place to live in the mid-19th century. Large recreation areas were established, such as the Royal Botanical Gardens, opened in 1831. The gardens were sited in Old Trafford on the advice of scientist John Dalton, because the prevailing southwesterly wind kept the area clear of the city's airborne pollution. In 1857, the gardens hosted the Art Treasures Exhibition, the largest art exhibition ever held in the United Kingdom. A purpose-built iron and glass building was constructed at a cost of £38,000 to house the 16,000 exhibits. The gardens were also chosen as a site for the Royal Jubilee Exhibition of 1887, celebrating Queen Victoria's 50-year reign. The exhibition ran for more than six months and was attended by more than 4.75 million visitors. The gardens were converted into an entertainment resort in 1907, and hosted the first speedway meeting in Greater Manchester on 16 June 1928. There was also greyhound racing from 1930, and an athletics track. The complex was demolished in the late 1980s, and all that remains is the entrance gates, close to what is now the White City Retail Park. The gates were designated a Grade II listed structure in 1987. The gates are not in their original position but were dismantled and turned through ninety degrees when the White City Retail Park was built.

=== Industrialisation ===
The arrival of the Manchester Ship Canal in 1894, and the subsequent development of the Trafford Park industrial estate in the north of the town – the first planned industrial estate in the world – had a substantial effect on Stretford's growth. The population in 1891 was 21,751, but by 1901 it had increased by 40% to 30,436 as people were drawn to the town by the promise of work in the new industries at Trafford Park.

During the Second World War Trafford Park was largely turned over to the production of matériel, including the Avro Manchester heavy bomber, and the Rolls-Royce Merlin engines used to power both the Spitfire and the Lancaster. (Note: The Rolls-Royce Merlin engine was made by Ford, under licence. The factory produced 34,000 engines, and employed 17,316 people.) That resulted in Stretford being the target for heavy bombing, particularly during the Manchester Blitz of 1940. On the nights of 22/23 and 23/24 December 1940 alone, 124 incendiaries and 120 high-explosive bombs fell on the town, killing 73 people and injuring many more. Among the buildings damaged or destroyed during the war were Manchester United's Old Trafford football ground, All Saints' Church, St Hilda's Church, and the children's library in King Street. Smoke generators were set up in the north of the town close to Trafford Park in an effort to hide it from enemy aircraft, and 11,900 children were evacuated to safer areas in Lancashire, Cheshire, Derbyshire, and Staffordshire, along with their teachers and supervisors. A memorial to those residents who lost their lives in the bombing was erected in Stretford Cemetery in 1948, over the communal grave of the 17 unidentified people who were killed in the blitz of December 1940.

Between 1972 and 1975, what is now a closed B&Q store (originally constructed as a multi-lane Bowling Alley) in Great Stone Road was the 3,000-capacity Hardrock Theatre and Village Discothèque, hosting some of that period's major artists in their prime. Led Zeppelin, David Bowie, Bob Marley, Elton John, Hawkwind, Yes, Chaka Khan, Curved Air and Lou Reed were amongst those who appeared. Tangerine Dream was the last band to perform at the Hardrock, on 19 October 1975. In more recent years, Lancashire Cricket Club's Old Trafford ground, next door, has provided a concert venue for bands such as Oasis, Foo Fighters, The Cure, Radiohead, Coldplay, Arctic Monkeys and Pixies.

=== Transport history ===
Stretford's growth was fuelled by the transport revolutions of the 18th and especially the 19th century: the Bridgewater Canal reached Stretford in 1761, and the railway in 1849. The completion of the Manchester South Junction and Altrincham Railway (MSJAR) in 1849, passing through Stretford, led to the population of the town nearly doubling in a decade, from 4,998 in 1851 to 8,757 by 1861.

Because Stretford is situated on the main A56 road between Chester and Manchester many travellers passed through the village, and as this traffic increased, more inns were built to provide travellers with stopping places. One of the earliest forms of public transport through Stretford was the stagecoach; the Angel Hotel, on the present day site of what used to be the Bass Drum public house, was one of the main stopping places for stagecoaches in Stretford, and the Trafford Arms was another. Horse-drawn omnibuses replaced the stagecoach service through Stretford in 1845. The Manchester Carriage Company's tramway from Manchester to Stretford was built in 1879, terminating at the Old Cock Hotel on the A56 road, next to which a small depot was built to house the cars and horses. A 1900 timetable shows that trams left for Manchester every 10 minutes between 8:00 am and 10:15 pm. The horse-drawn trams were replaced with electric trams in 1902, and after the Second World War the trams were replaced by buses.

The MSJAR railway line through Stretford was electrified in 1931 and converted to light rail operation in 1992, when it became part of the Manchester Metrolink tram network. The first Metrolink tram through Stretford ran on 15 June 1992.

== Governance ==
=== Civic history ===
Stretford was part of the ancient parish of Manchester, within the historic county boundaries of Lancashire. Following the Poor Law Amendment Act 1834, a national scheme for dealing with the relief of the poor, Stretford joined the Chorlton Poor Law Union in 1837, one of three such unions in Manchester, before transferring to the Barton-upon-Irwell Poor Law Union in 1849. In 1867, Stretford Local Board of Health was established, assuming responsibility for the local government of the area in 1868. The board's responsibilities included sanitation and the maintenance of the highways, and it had the authority to levy rates to pay for those services. The local board continued in that role until it was superseded by the creation of Stretford Urban District Council in 1894, as a result of the Local Government Act 1894.

Stretford Urban District became the Municipal Borough of Stretford in 1933, giving it borough status in the United Kingdom. Stretford Borough Council was granted its arms on 20 February 1933. The roses are the red roses of Lancashire, and the lion in the centre represents John of Gaunt, 1st Duke of Lancaster. Above the lion are a crossed flail and scythe; the flail comes from the arms of the de Trafford family; the scythe is a reminder of the agricultural history of the area; the thunderbolts above represent the importance of electricity in Stretford's industrial development. The boat at the bottom represents Stretford's links to the sea via the Manchester Ship Canal.

In 1974, as a result of the Local Government Act 1972, the Municipal Borough of Stretford was abolished and Stretford has, since 1 April 1974, formed part of the Metropolitan Borough of Trafford, in Greater Manchester. Trafford Town Hall – previously Stretford Town Hall – is the administrative centre of Trafford.

=== Political representation ===
The constituency of Stretford was created in 1885, and existed until 1997, when it was replaced by the present constituency of Stretford and Urmston. Beverley Hughes was Labour MP during the New Labour government. Kate Green, a member of the Labour Party, became the MP at the 2010 General Election, with a majority of 8,935, representing 48.6% of the vote. She retained the seat at the 2017 General Election with an increased majority of 19,705, which represents 66.8% of the vote. The Conservatives took 27.0% of the vote, UKIP 2.2%, the Liberal Democrats 2.0%, the Green Party 1.3%, and the Christian Party 0.2%. Green resigned as MP in 2022 to replace Hughes as her role as Deputy Mayor of Greater Manchester, and the following by-election was won by Leader of Trafford Council Andrew Western, retaining the seat for Labour with an increased share of the vote.

Stretford is one of the four major urban areas in Trafford; the other three are Altrincham, Sale and Urmston. The area historically known as Stretford, between the River Irwell in the north and the River Mersey in the south, was divided between the Trafford local government wards of Clifford, Longford, Gorse Hill, and Stretford from 2004 to 2023. In 2023, all four wards underwent boundary changes, Clifford being reshaped into a new Old Trafford ward, Longford changing slightly but retaining its name, Gorse Hill becoming Gorse Hill and Cornbrook and Stretford being expanded to form Stretford and Humphrey Park. Each ward is represented by three local councillors, giving Stretford 12 of the 63 seats on Trafford Council. The wards elect in thirds on a four yearly cycle. As of the 2024 local elections, all 12 councillors representing the Stretford area are members of the Labour Party.

== Geography ==
Stretford

Climate chart (precipitation, max. and min. temperature)
J	F	M	A	M	J	J	A	S	O	N	D
70 8 2	70 8 2	50 10 3	63 13 5	51 16 8	58 19 10	54 21 12	69 21 12	63 18 10	88 14 7	82 10 4	78 7 2
- █ Average max. and min. temperatures in °C
- █ Precipitation totals in mm
- Source: World Weather Online
Imperial conversion
J	F	M	A	M	J	J	A	S	O	N	D
2.8 46 36	2.8 46 36	2 50 37	2.5 55 41	2 61 46	2.3 66 50	2.1 70 54	2.7 70 54	2.5 64 50	3.5 57 45	3.2 50 39	3.1 45 36
- █ Average max. and min. temperatures in °F
- █ Precipitation totals in inches

Stretford occupies an area of 4.1 square miles (10.6 km^{2}), just north of the River Mersey, at 53°26′48″N 2°18′31″W (53.4466, −2.3086). The area is generally flat, sloping slightly southwards towards the river valley, and is approximately 150 feet (46 m) above sea level at its highest point. The most southerly part of Stretford lies within the flood plain of the River Mersey, and so has historically been prone to flooding. A great deal of flood mitigation work has been carried out in the Mersey Valley since the 1970s, with the stretch of the Mersey through Stretford canalised to speed up the passage of floodwater. Emergency floodbasins have also been constructed, Sale Water Park being a prominent local example, lying immediately to the south of Stretford.

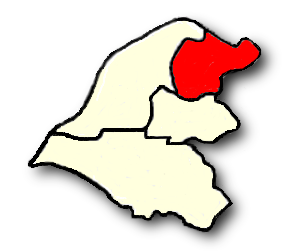
The Metropolitan Borough of Trafford, highlighting Stretford in red

Stretford comprises the local areas of Old Trafford, Firswood, Gorse Hill, and Trafford Park and represents the northeastern tip of Trafford. Its climate is generally temperate, with few extremes of temperature or weather. The mean temperature is slightly above average for the United Kingdom. Annual rainfall and average amount of sunshine are both slightly below the average for the UK.

Stretford's built environment developed along the A56 road in two separate sections, corresponding to the original two manors. The area in the south, near to the border with Sale, grew around the church of St Matthew – an old alternative name for the town was Stretford St. Matthew. The northern part of Stretford was centred on Old Trafford, with undeveloped countryside separating them. During the 19th century, the sections merged.

The western terminus of the early medieval linear earthwork Nico Ditch is in Hough Moss, just to the east of Stretford; it was probably used as an administrative boundary and dates from the 8th or 9th century.

== Demography ==
Stretford ethnicity compared
2011 UK Census	Stretford	Trafford	England
Total population	46,910	226,578	53,012,456
Foreign born	22%	11%	14%
White	63%	86%	85%
Asian	21%	8%	8%
Black	8%	3%	4%
Average age	36.0 y	39.3 y	39.3 y
Over 65 years old	12%	16%	16%

As at the 2011 UK census, the Stretford area wards of Clifford, Gorse Hill, Longford and Stretford had a total population of 46,910 and a population density of 8,907 persons per square mile (3,439 per km^{2}).

Stretford residents had an average age of 36 years, younger than the 39.3 Trafford average. For every 100 females, there were 97.8 males. Of all residents, 42% were single (never married): in Trafford, 33% were single. Of the 19,209 households, 33% were one-person households, 56% were married couples with dependent children, and 15% were lone parents with dependent children. Of those aged 16–74 in Stretford, 23% had no academic qualifications, higher than the 18% in all of Trafford.

With 78% of residents born in the United Kingdom, there is a relatively high proportion of foreign-born residents reported. There is also a high proportion of non-white people, as 63% of residents were recorded as white. The largest minority group was Asian, at 21% of the population.

In 1931, 19% of Stretford's population was middle class and 20% working class compared to 14% middle class and 36% working class nationally. The rest of the population was made up of clerical workers and skilled manual workers. By 1971, the middle class in Stretford had declined steadily to 15% whilst the working class had grown to 31% compared to 24% middle class and 26% working class nationally.

Population change in Stretford since 1801
Year	1801	1811	1821	1831	1841	1851	1861	1871	1881	1891	1901	1911	1921	1931	1939	1951	1961	1971	2001
Population	1,477	1,720	2,173	2,463	3,524	4,998	8,757	11,945	19,018	21,751	30,436	42,496	46,535	56,791	51,929	61,874	60,364	54,316	37,455
Source: A Vision of Britain through Time

== Economy ==
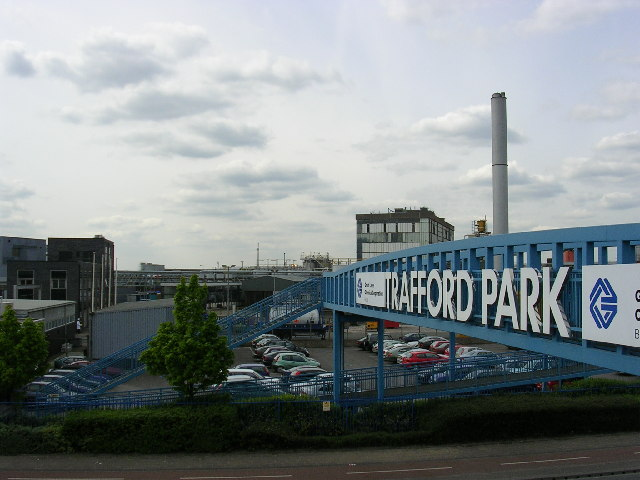
Entrance to Trafford Park industrial estate

Until the end of the 19th century Stretford was a largely agricultural village. The development of the Trafford Park industrial estate in the north of the town, beginning in the late 19th century, had a significant effect on Stretford's subsequent development. At its peak in 1945 the park employed an estimated 75,000 workers; housing and other amenities had to be constructed on what had previously been agricultural land. Trafford Park is still a very significant source of employment, containing an estimated 1,400 companies and employing about 44,000 people.

The main shopping centre was Stretford Mall in the commercial centre of Stretford, previously known as Stretford Arndale. It was opened in 1969 and changed its name in 2003. It is still (as of 2022) referred to as the "Stretford Arndale" on local bus timetables and recorded announcements. It closed on 28 Feb 2026, and is scheduled for demolition, to be replaced by a new King Street. Stretford Mall was built on the site of the original shopping centre in the former King Street. The Trafford Centre, a large shopping and leisure complex opened in September 1998, lies to the northwest of Stretford about 2.5 miles (4.0 km) away.

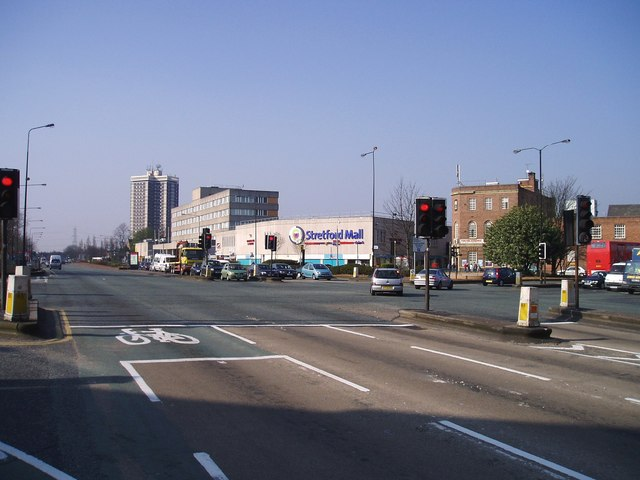
Stretford's town centre, showing Stretford Mall in the midground

According to the 2011 UK census, the industry of employment of residents in Stretford was 17% retail and wholesale, 11% health and social work, 11% education, 7% manufacturing, 6% transport and storage, 6% public administration and defence, 6% professional, scientific and technical activities, 5% hotels and restaurants, 5% construction, 5% finance, 1% energy and water supply, 0.06% agriculture and 5% other. This is roughly in line with national figures, except for the town's relatively low percentage of agricultural workers.

The 2011 census recorded the economic activity of residents aged 16–74 as 39.3% in full-time employment, 13.6% in part-time employment, 7.5% self-employed, 5.7% unemployed, 5.9% students, 9.5% retired, 5.6% looking after home or family, and 6.1% permanently sick or disabled. The 5.7% unemployment rate in Stretford was high compared with the national rate of 3.2%. According to the Office for National Statistics estimates, between April 2001 and March 2002 the average gross income of households in Stretford was £415 per week (£21,664 per year).

== Landmarks ==
=== Longford Cinema ===
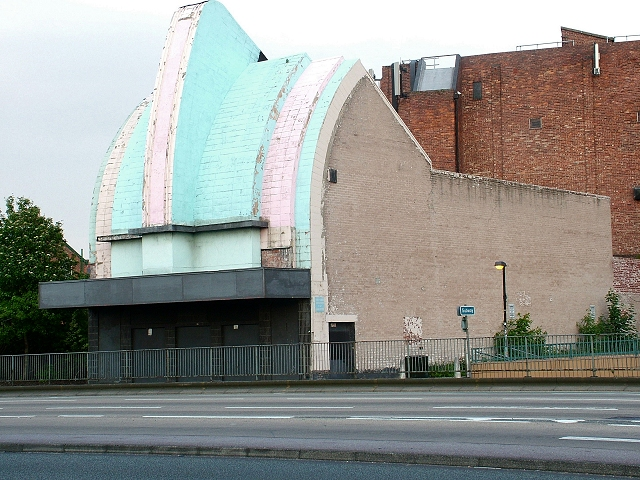
Longford Cinema, May 2007

Longford Cinema, opposite Stretford Mall, on the eastern side of the A56 Chester Road, is perhaps the most visually striking building in the town. Designed by the architect Henry Elder, it was the height of Art Deco fashion when it was opened by the Mayor of Stretford in 1936. Its unusual "cash register" frontage was intended to symbolise the business aspect of show business.

The building incorporated many modern features, such as sound-proofing and under-seat heating, and it was also the first cinema in Britain to make use of concealed neon lighting. It had a seating capacity of 1,400 in the stalls and 600 in the circle, with a further 146 seats in the café area. When built, the cinema had a short pedestrian approach to the facade, which was removed when the A56 was widened. During the Second World War the building was used for concerts, including one given by a young Julie Andrews. It also played host to the Hallé Orchestra after the orchestra's own home, the Free Trade Hall, was bombed and severely damaged during the Manchester Blitz of 1940.

After a change of ownership in 1950, the cinema was renamed the Stretford Essoldo. It continued to operate as a cinema until 1965, when it was converted into a bingo hall, which it remained until its closure in 1995. The building has been unused since then. It was designated a Grade II listed building in 1994.

In 2017 a proposal was put forward by Trafford Council to bring the Essoldo back into use as part of the new University Academy 92, to provide student amenities and other community facilities such as an enhanced library.

=== Great Stone ===
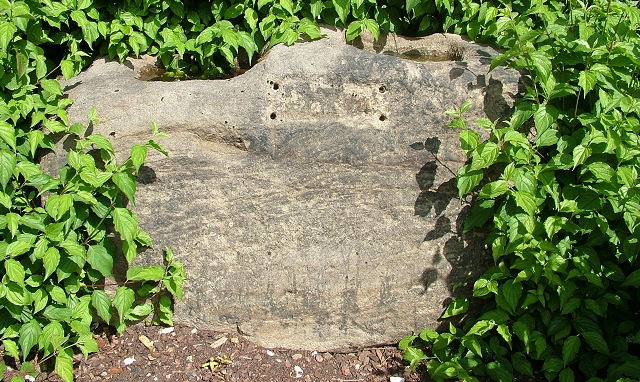
The Great Stone

The Great Stone, which gave its name to the Great Stone Road, where it was located until being moved in 1925, is one of Stretford's most easily overlooked landmarks. The stone is composed of millstone grit and was probably deposited as a glacial erratic. It is rectangular in shape, about 5 feet (2 m) wide, 2 feet (1 m) deep, and 3 feet (1 m) tall, with two 7-inch (18 cm) deep rectangular slots cut into its upper surface.

Several suggestions have been made for the history of the Great Stone. There was a succession of plagues in Manchester from the 14th century onwards, and during the Great Plague of 1655–56 the holes in the top of the stone were filled with vinegar or holy water, through which coins were passed in the belief that would halt the spread of the disease. But the holes are probably too deep for that to have been the stone's original purpose. It may have been a marker on the Roman road between Northwich and Manchester, or some kind of boundary marker. The Great Stone is also thought to have been the base of an Anglo-Saxon cross shaft. A local legend had it that the stone was slowly sinking into the earth, and that its ultimate disappearance would mark the end of the world.

When the Great Stone Road was widened in the late 19th century, the stone was moved back from the road slightly. In 1925, the stone was moved again, to its current location outside the North Lodge of Gorse Hill Park, about 328 feet (100 m) from its historical location. The stone is a Grade II listed structure.

=== Cenotaph ===
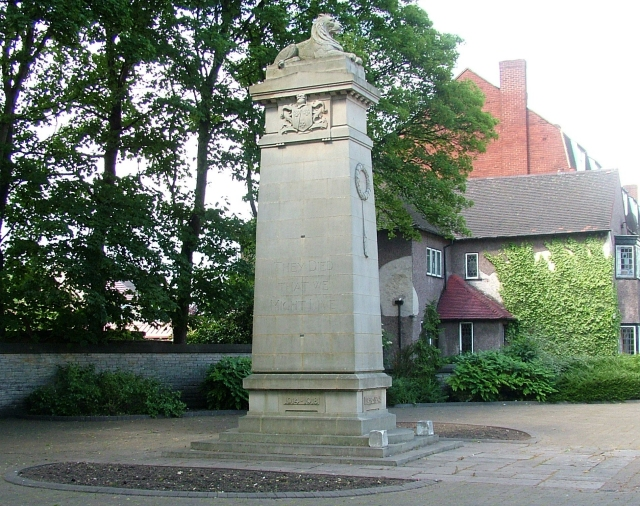
Stretford Cenotaph

Stretford Cenotaph, opposite the Chester Road entrance to Gorse Hill Park, was built as a memorial to the 580 Stretford men who lost their lives in the First World War. Their names and regiments are listed on a large bronze plaque on the wall behind the cenotaph. It was formally unveiled in 1923, by the Earl of Derby, Secretary of State for War.

The cenotaph is 24 feet (7 m) high and 11 feet (3 m) wide at its base. It cost £2,000 to build, raised by public subscription and a donation from the Stretford Red Cross. The memorial bears the legend "They died that we might live" on one side, and "In memory of the heroic dead" on the other. It is a Grade II listed structure.

Stretford's remembrance parade, which is made up of the Scouting, Girl Guiding and Boys Brigade divisions from the area as well as the cadets finishes here, in a semi-circle around the Cenotaph whilst the public and independent representatives stand on the main road which is closed for the occasion. The march goes from the Metro Club to the Cenotaph and back, with the Boys Brigade Band striking up the music for this event.

=== Longford Park ===
For more information, see Longford Park

=== Stretford Public Hall ===
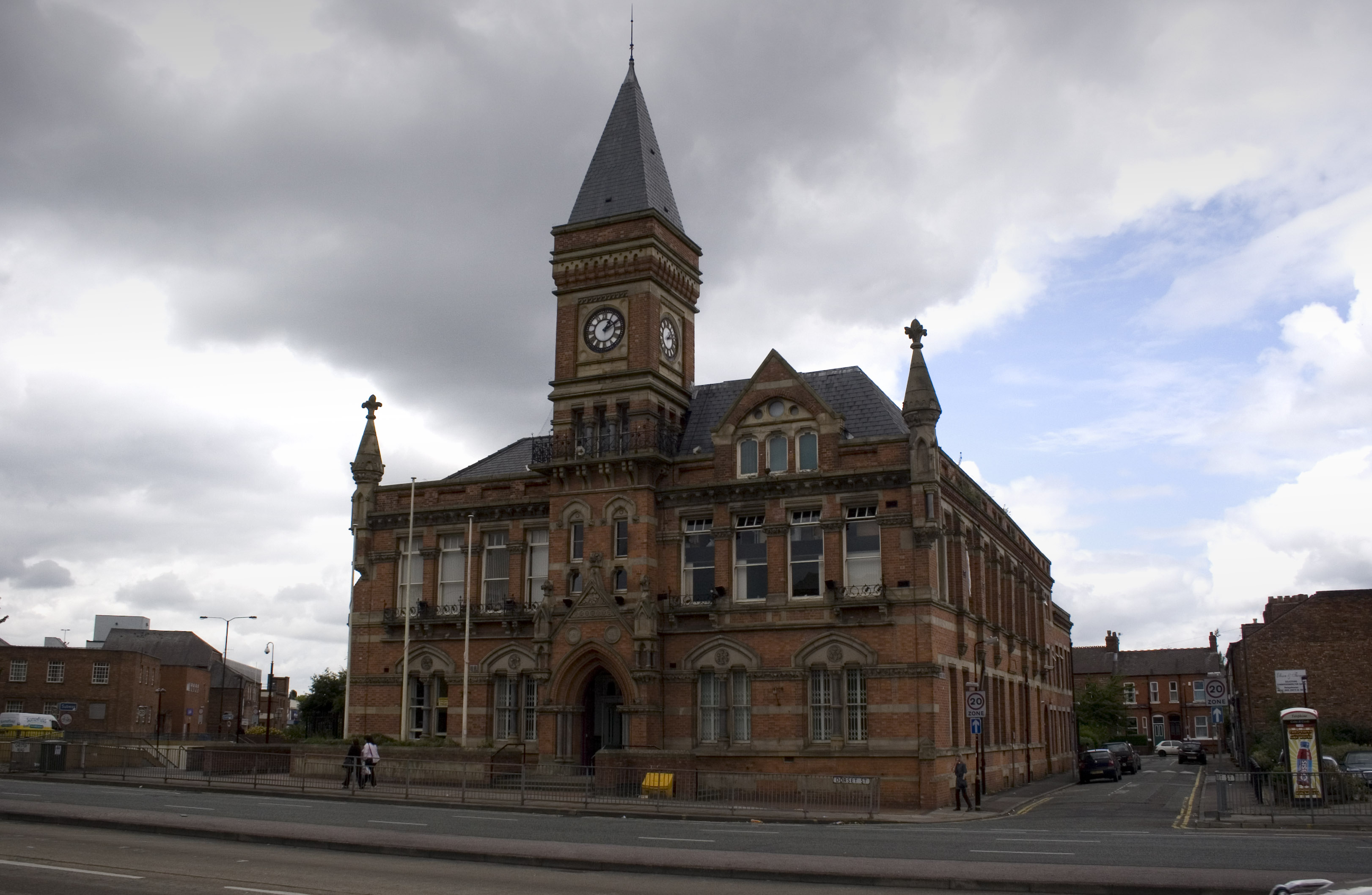
Stretford Public Hall

Stretford Public Hall was built in 1878 by John Rylands. It was designed by N. Lofthouse and is on the western side of the A56 Chester Road, opposite the Longford Cinema. Stretford's first public lending library was established in the building in 1883. On the death of Rylands in 1888, his widow placed the building at the disposal of the local authority for a nominal rent, and on her own death in 1908, the building was bought by Stretford Council for £5,000.

Public baths were built to the rear of the building, accessed via Cyprus Street. In 1940 the new Stretford Library was opened on King Street, and the public hall was rendered surplus. The building re-opened in March 1949 as the Stretford Civic Theatre, with a well-equipped stage for the use of local groups. After the Stretford Leisure Centre opened in 1983 now Stretford Sports Village, the Cyprus Street Baths wing fell into disuse, and was demolished. The remainder of the building began to fall into disrepair, despite being designated a Grade II listed structure in 1987, until Trafford Council refurbished and converted the hall to serve as council offices in the mid-1990s. It was re-opened in 1997, once again named Stretford Public Hall.

=== Stretford Cemetery ===
Stretford Cemetery was designed by John Shaw and opened in 1885. Its chapel is in the Decorated style, designed by architects Bellamy & Hardy, and quite elaborate. On the western side is a memorial to the casualties of the Second World War and to the east a newer section of the cemetery.

=== Trafford Town Hall ===
Trafford Town Hall stands in a large site at the junction of Talbot Road and Warwick Road, directly opposite the Old Trafford Cricket Ground. Work on the building, designed by architects Bradshaw Gass & Hope of Bolton, began on 21 August 1931.

The town hall officially came into use as Stretford Town Hall on the granting of Stretford's charter, on 16 September 1933. In 1974, on the formation of the new Trafford Metropolitan Borough, Stretford Town Hall was adopted as the base for the new council and renamed Trafford Town Hall; it was designated a Grade II listed building in 2007.

=== Union Church ===
The Union Church was formed in 1862, with John Rylands as its patron; he laid the foundation stone of its building in Edge Lane, close to Longford Park's southern entrance, in 1867. In the latter part of the 20th century the church was converted into office accommodation but by the early 21st century was standing empty. In 2012 it was restored to its original use a church having been bought by the Church of Christ – Iglesia ni Cristo.

== Transport ==
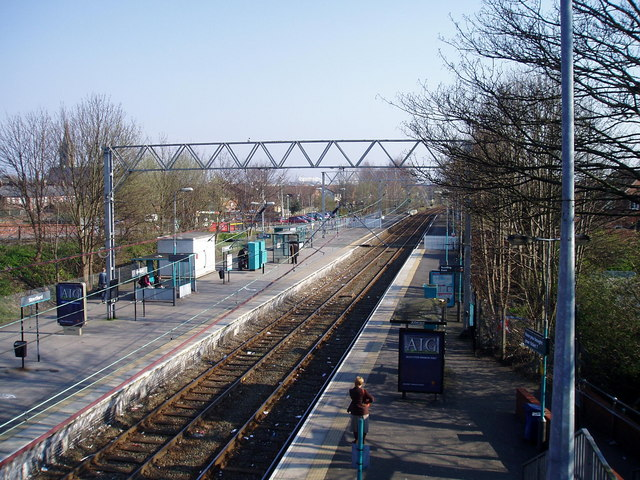
Stretford tram stop

Stretford tram stop is part of the Manchester Metrolink tram system and lies on the Altrincham to Bury line. Trams leave about every six minutes between 7:15 and 18:30, but every 12 minutes at other times of the day.

The nearest railway station is Trafford Park, on the Liverpool to Manchester line. Services are roughly every two hours in each direction, with extra services calling during the peak hours.

The 20-acre (8 ha) Trafford Park Euroterminal rail freight terminal, opened in 1993, is in the Gorse Hill area of Stretford. It cost £11 million and has the capacity to deal with 100,000 containers a year. The containers are handled by two huge gantry cranes, the noise from which has led to complaints from some local residents.

The town has good access to the motorway network. Junction 7 of the M60 is just to the north of Stretford's boundary with Sale and the A56 road gives easy access to the south, as well as to Manchester city centre in the other direction.

Cycle paths exist as part of the Trafford cycle initiative.

Manchester Airport, the busiest in the UK outside London, is about nine miles (14 km) to the south of Stretford. Frequent bus and tram services can be taken to get there from Stretford, though taking the tram will require a change of services at Cornbrook.

== Media ==
Local news and television programmes are provided by BBC North West and ITV Granada. Television signals are received from the Winter Hill TV transmitter.

Local radio stations are BBC Radio Manchester on 95.1 FM, Heart North West on 105.4 FM, Smooth North West on 100.4 FM, Capital Manchester and Lancashire on 102.0 FM, Greatest Hits Radio Manchester & The North West on 96.2 FM, and Wythenshawe FM, a community based station which broadcast on 97.2 FM and online.

The town is served by the local newspaper, The Stretford & Urmston Messenger.

== Education ==
Along with the rest of Trafford, Stretford maintains a selective education system assessed by the 11-plus examination.

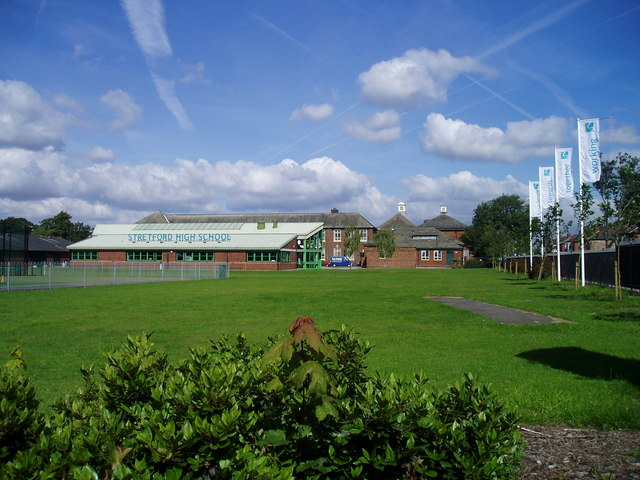
Stretford High School in 2007

The proportion of pupils leaving Stretford Grammar School with five or more GCSEs at grades A*–C in 2006, was 98.3%, compared to an average of 66.7% for all secondary schools in Trafford and a national UK average of 61.3%. The proportion of students from minority ethnic backgrounds, and for whom English is an additional language, is much higher than the average. Stretford Grammar was awarded specialist Science College status in September 2005. The school was assessed as "good" in its April 2015 Ofsted report.

Stretford High School Community Languages College, like Stretford Grammar, has a much higher proportion than the national average of pupils with a first language other than English, many of them being either asylum seekers or refugees. In 2004 Stretford High School was made subject to special measures, as it was considered not to be providing an adequate education for its pupils. Substantial improvement has taken place since then; the school was assessed as "satisfactory" in its November 2005 Ofsted report and was removed from special measures. Further improvements saw Stretford High School gain an "outstanding" assessment from Ofsted, following its February 2008 inspection. GCSE results also placed the school in the top 1% of schools in the country for adding value to its students.

Stretford also has the specialist Arts College, Lostock High School.

Plans to build a new university in the town, to be known as University Academy 92, were announced in September 2017. A branch of Lancaster University, it hopes to welcome the first of its anticipated 6500 students in September 2019. The campus is to be built on the Kelloggs headquarters site on Talbot Road, which has already been acquired by Trafford Council for £12 million. (Note: Kelloggs will be moving their offices to MediaCityUK in 2018.)

== Religion ==
Stretford compared
2001 UK Census	Stretford	Trafford	England
Total population	46,910	226,578	53,012,456
Christian	51.2%	63.4%	59.4%
Muslim	18.4%	5.7%	5.0%
Sikh	2.7%	0.7%	0.8%
Hindu	0.8%	1.0%	1.5%
Buddhist	0.3%	0.3%	0.5%
Jewish	0.2%	1.1%	0.5%
No religion	19.7%	21.2%	24.7%

The date of the first church to be built in Stretford is unrecorded, but in a lease dated 1413, land is described as lying next to a chapel. Many of the present day churches in the area were constructed during the late 19th and early 20th century, as the population of Stretford began to grow.

Methodism was a significant influence in 19th-century Stretford, but of the seventeen churches in the town today, only one is Methodist whereas five are Roman Catholic. The Catholic mission in Stretford was begun in 1859, in a small chapel on Herbert Street.

As at the 2011 UK census, 51% of Stretford residents reported themselves as being Christian, 18% as Muslim, and 3% as Sikh. No other religion was represented at higher than 1% of the population, with 20% reporting themselves as having no religion.

Stretford is in the Roman Catholic Diocese of Salford, and the Anglican Diocese of Manchester.

There are two Grade II listed churches in Stretford: the Church of St Ann and the Church of St Matthew. St Ann's is a Roman Catholic church, built in 1862–67 by E. W. Pugin for Sir Humphrey and Lady Annette de Trafford. It was officially opened by Bishop William Turner on 22 November 1863, and was consecrated in June 1867. Features include a historic organ built by Jardine & Co (1867) and a good number of fine stained glass windows by Hardman & Co of Birmingham. St Matthew's church was built in 1842 by William Hayley (a Manchester architect) in the Gothic Revival style, with additional phases in 1869, 1906 and 1922.

== Sport ==
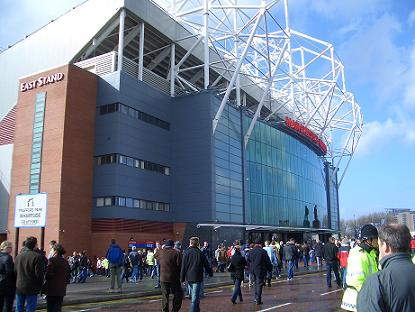
Manchester United's Old Trafford football ground

Stretford has been the home of Manchester United Football Club since 1910, when the club moved to its present Old Trafford ground; the western end of the ground is still unofficially called the Stretford End.

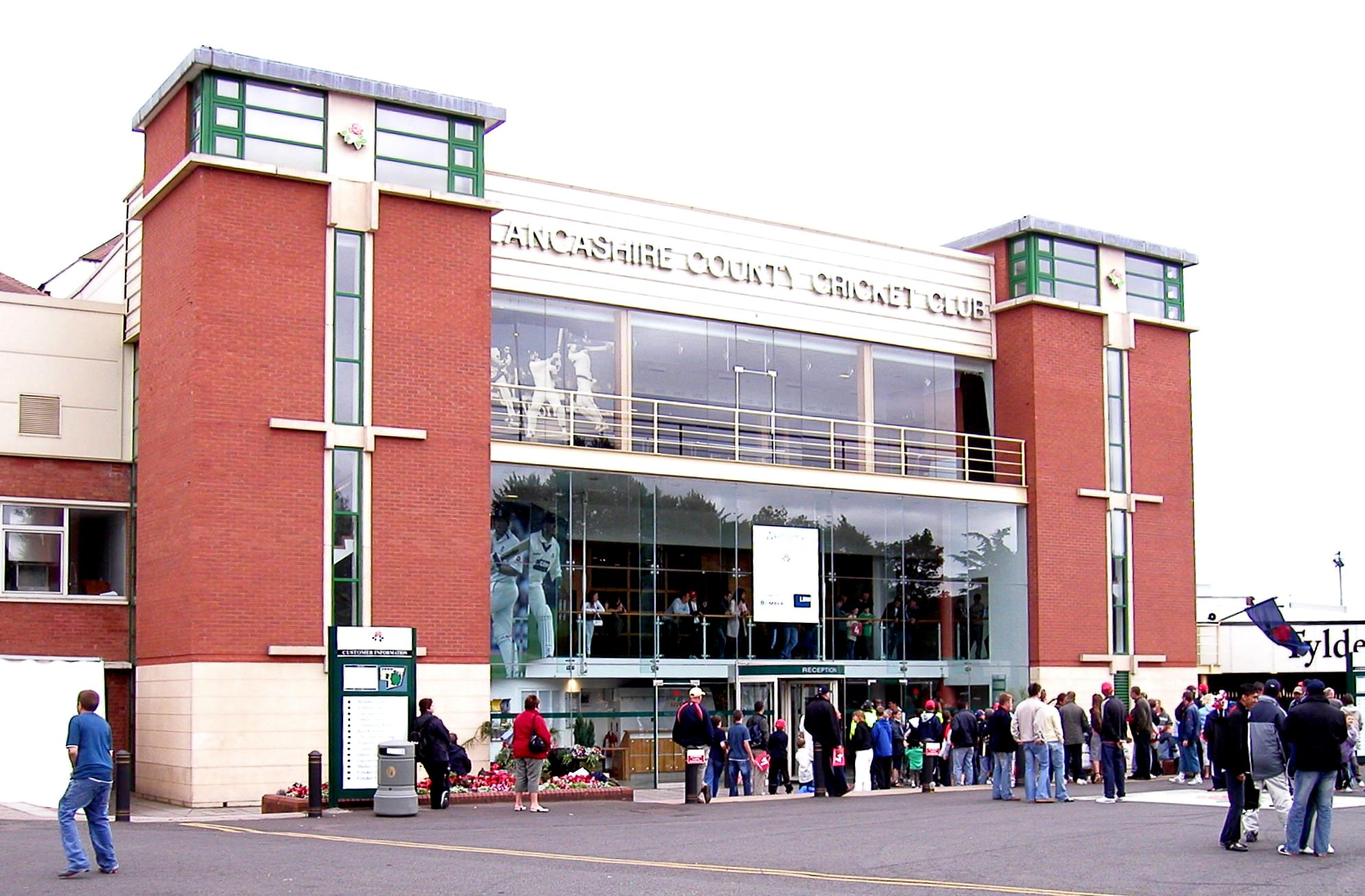
Lancashire CCC – main entrance

Old Trafford was originally the home of Manchester Cricket Club, but became the home of Lancashire County Cricket Club in 1864 upon that club's formation. The ground is on Talbot Road, Stretford, where it has been since 1856. Similar to its counterpart, one end of the Old Trafford cricket ground is called the Stretford End. It has been a Test venue since 1884 and has hosted three World Cup semi-finals. After the 2005 Ashes Test, when more than 20,000 fans had to be turned away, the decision was made to increase the ground's capacity from 20,000 to 25,000. Initial plans included building a new stadium on the site of Trafford Town Hall, opposite the present ground. Trafford Council voted against the demolition of the town hall and instead, in 2007, signed an agreement jointly with Lancashire County Cricket Club, Ask Developments and Tesco, to redevelop the ground on its present site. The new cricket ground will be at the heart of a 750,000 square feet (69,677 m^{2}) development that will also include business space, residential, retail, hotel and leisure facilities. More than £25 million is expected to be invested in the redevelopments at Old Trafford.

Stretford Stadium, adjoining Longford Park, is the home of Trafford Athletic Club. Trafford is one of the UK's top athletic clubs, with more than 100 members having competed at international level.

The Stretford Sports Village, run by Trafford Community Leisure Trust, comprises two main centres: the original Stretford Leisure Centre, now called the Chester Centre, and the facility at Stretford High School called the Talbot Centre. The Stretford Sports Village is between Manchester United Football Club's Old Trafford stadium and Lancashire County Cricket Club's Old Trafford ground. The centres have a 25-metre main pool, a 20-metre children's pool, four gyms, a table tennis room, twelve badminton courts, two five-a-side courts, a spinning studio, practice hall, training rooms, community room, a cafe, an outdoor full-size floodlight artificial turf pitch and a full-size grass pitch. Trafford Water Sports Centre lies just across Stretford's southern border with Sale, about one mile (1.6 km) from Stretford town centre.

== Culture and cultural references ==
Although Stretford town centre is busy during the day, there is very little in the way of a night-time economy. There are few restaurants and other entertainments except for a number of public houses and members-only social clubs. There are two public libraries: Greatstone Library, part of Stretford Sports Village, and Stretford Library, both run by Trafford Council.

The Stretford Pageant is an annual Rose Queen festival held on the last Saturday of June; the inaugural pageant was staged in 1919. There is a procession of decorated floats through the streets, collecting money for local charities and ending at Longford Park, where the Rose Queen is crowned. The tradition of the Rose Queen derives from an earlier event organised by St Peter's Church from 1909 until the pageant began in 1919. Various other entertainments are provided in the park on the day of the pageant, such as a fun fair and a car boot sale. Stretford Pageant, along with similar events in other parts of Trafford, is under threat because of the council's proposals to reduce funding and support for such events in the future.

The Stretford Wives is a television drama that was broadcast by the BBC in August 2002, watched by 5.7 million viewers. Written by Danny Brocklehurst, it is the story of three sisters living in Stretford, although most of the filming took place in nearby Salford. The programme received a mixed critical reception.

=== Invention and discovery ===
The Stretford process was developed at the North Western Gas Board's laboratories in Stretford during the 1940s. It was the first liquid phase oxidation process for removing hydrogen sulphide (H_{2}S) from town gas to be commercially successful. Many Stretford plants were built worldwide.

== Public services ==
Policing in Stretford is the responsibility of the Greater Manchester Police whose HQ is in Old Trafford. The force's "M" Division, responsible for policing in Trafford, is also based in Stretford, close to Trafford Town Hall.

Waste management is co-ordinated by the local authority via the Greater Manchester Waste Disposal Authority.

Healthcare is overseen by the NHS with hospitals nearby in Davyhulme (Trafford General Hospital) and Wythenshawe (Wythenshawe Hospital). The nearest ambulance stations are located in Urmston and Sale. Greater Manchester Fire and Rescue Service (GMFRS) oversee the fire and rescue services in Stretford. One of their 3 fire stations can be found in Stretford on Park Road, near the Trafford Centre and Kellogg's Factory.

== Notable people ==
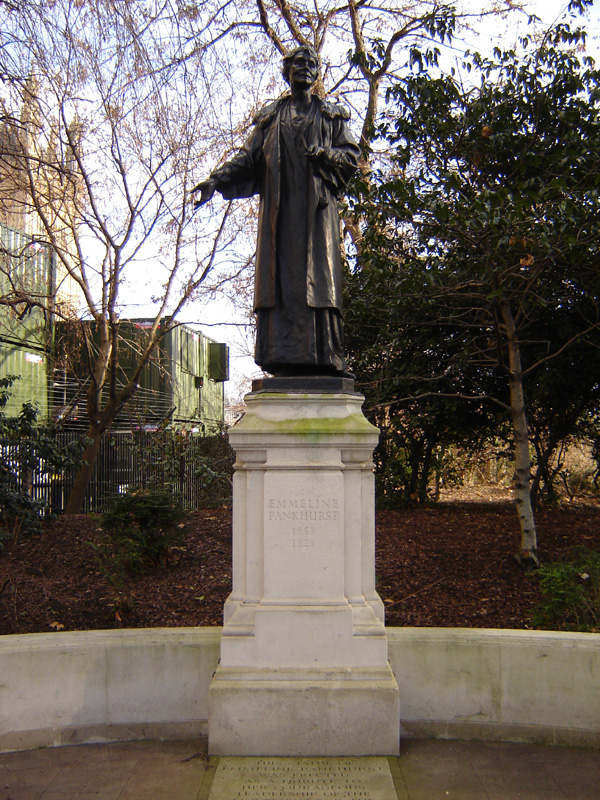
Statue of Emmeline Pankhurst in Victoria Tower Gardens, Westminster

Located close to Trafford Park, the world's first planned industrial estate, one of the world's first industrial espionage agents, John Holker, (1719–1786). was born in the local area.

Two of Stretford's most famous residents were the suffragette Emmeline Pankhurst (1858–1928) and the painter L. S. Lowry (1887–1976). Manchester's first multi-millionaire, John Rylands (1801–1888) (a textile entrepreneur and philanthropist) and his wife Enriqueta Augustina Rylands lived at Longford Hall in Stretford during the later parts of their lives. She founded the John Rylands Research Institute and Library. John Alcock (1892–1919), from Stretford, a Royal Navy and later Royal Air Force officer and Arthur Whitten Brown (1886–1948), respectively piloted and navigated the first non-stop transatlantic flight from St. John's, Newfoundland to Clifden, County Galway in 1919.

The radical firebrand socialist, and later post-war politician Herschel Lewis Austin (1911–1974) served Stretford as a Labour MP from 1945 to 1950. Baldwin Spencer (1860–1929) a British-Australian biologist and anthropologist was born in Stretford, as were ABC's lead singer Martin Fry (born 1958), rock climber Derek Hersey (1956–1993), and television actor John Comer (1924–1984), best known for his role as café owner Sid in the BBC sitcom Last of the Summer Wine.

A number of Manchester United players, including some of those who died in the Munich air disaster of February 1958, lived in lodgings at 19 Gorse Avenue. A blue plaque was unveiled at the house by former lodger and Munich survivor Bobby Charlton in recognition of the house's association with Manchester United. The owner of the house during the 1950s was Margaret Watson, but by the time of the plaque's unveiling more than 50 years later it was occupied by a different family.

=== Additional notable people ===
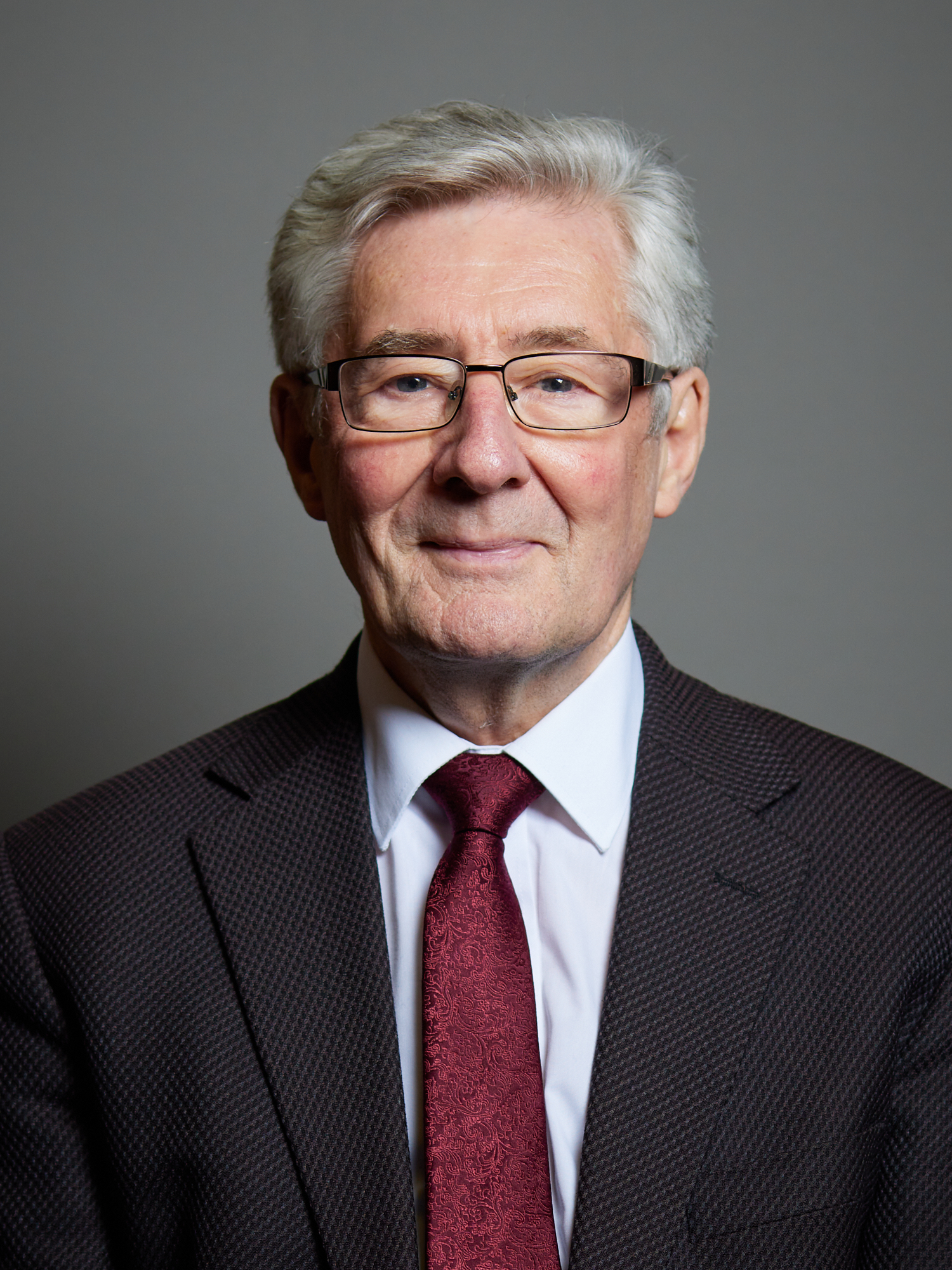
Tony Lloyd, 2021

- Thomas Robinson (1864–1953), industrialist, politician and MP for Stretford, 1918-1931
- Adrian Bell (1901–1980), ruralist journalist and farmer, the first compiler of The Times crossword.
- Hugh Scanlon (1913–2004), a British trade union leader, brought up locally
- Frank Pemberton (1914–1971), stage and TV actor, played patriarch Frank Barlow in Coronation Street
- John Marriott (1922–2001), philatelist, the keeper of the Royal Philatelic Collection from 1969 to 1995.
- Tony Lloyd (1950–2024), politician, MP for 36 years, including 14 for Stretford, from 1983 to 1997.
- Ian Curtis (1956–1980), singer, songwriter and musician and occasional guitarist of the band Joy Division
- Andy Gibb (1958–1988), singer and musician with his brothers in the Bee Gees
- Jay Kay (born 1969), singer and songwriter, co-founder of the acid jazz and funk band Jamiroquai
- Faye Brookes (born 1987), actress, played Kate Connor on the ITV soap opera Coronation Street
- Riley Carter Millington (born 1993/1994), actor, played Kyle Slater in EastEnders

=== Sport ===
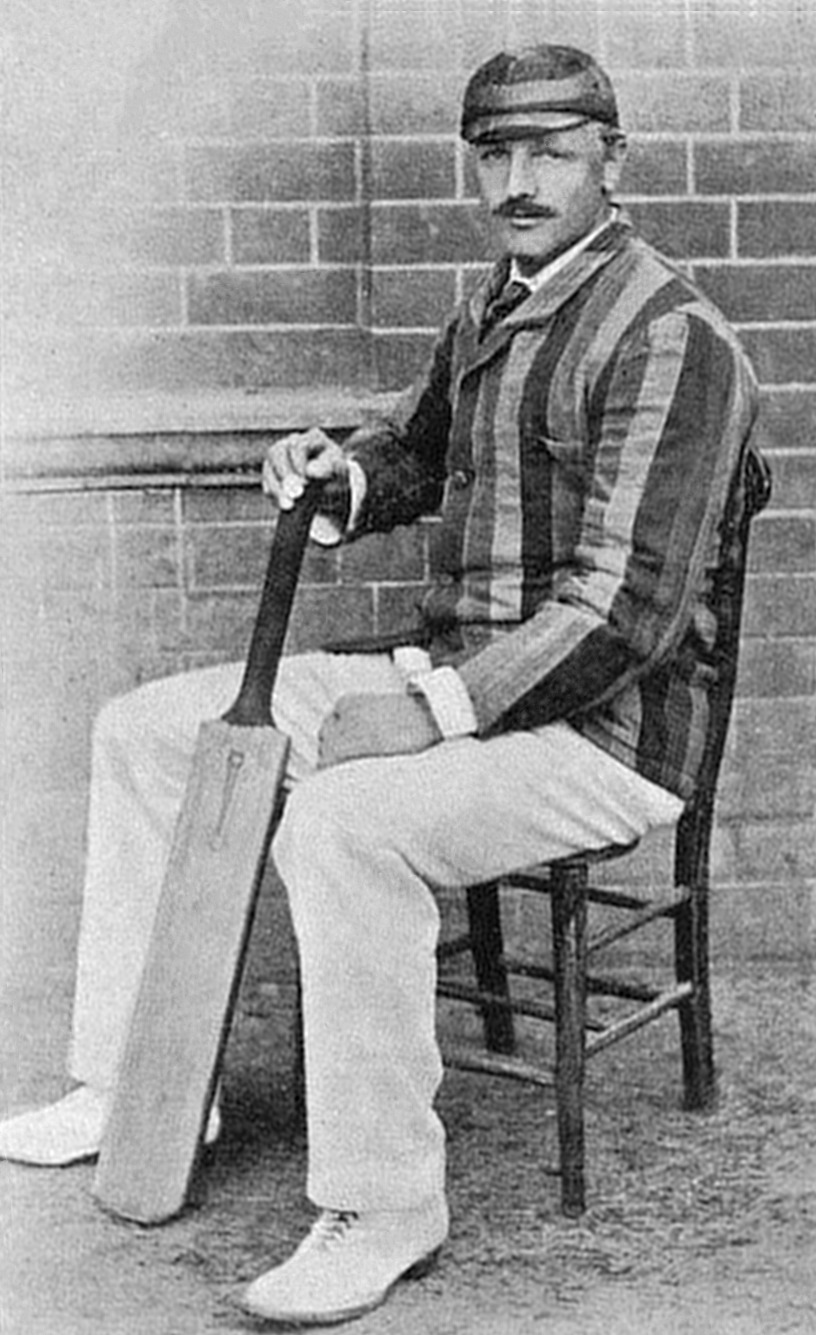
Charles de Trafford, ca.1896

- Ned Painter (1784–1852), an English bare-knuckle prize fighter.
- Charles de Trafford (1864–1951), an aristocrat and first-class cricketer, played 292 First-class cricket matches
- Alan Mills (1935–2024), English tennis player and tournament referee for the Wimbledon Championships
- David Shawcross (1941–2015), footballer who played 239 games including 132 for Halifax Town
- Derek Hersey (1956–1993), a British rock climber who specialized in free soloing in Boulder, Colorado
- John Sheridan (born 1964), footballer, played 621 games including 230 for Leeds United and 34 for Republic of Ireland
- Mike Davies (born 1966), footballer who played 310 games for Blackpool
- Darren Sheridan (born 1967), footballer and manager, played 449 games including 149 for Barnsley
- Danny Whitehead (born 1993), footballer who has played over 300 games, starting with 59 for Stockport County

== See also ==
- Listed buildings in Stretford
