= West London Institute of Higher Education =

Educational institution in London, England

The West London Institute of Higher Education (WLIHE), a two-campus academic establishment, was located in Isleworth and East Twickenham, West London, UK from 1976 until 1995 when it became Brunel University College. In 1997 it was fully integrated into Brunel University London.

Lancaster House, Osterley campus

== Establishment ==
The Borough Road Teacher Training College developed from a school in Borough Road, Southwark, opened by Joseph Lancaster in 1798. It started training male apprentices in 1809. Women were trained from 1813, initially on a separate site, until 1861, when they were transferred to Stockwell College. In 1890 the college moved to the buildings of the former London International College in Isleworth, West London.

West London Institute was created in 1976 from the merger of Borough Road and Maria Grey teacher training colleges and Chiswick Polytechnic. As a College of Higher Education from 1976, West London received funding from the local government, and it had to perform adequately in the higher education sector. It was placed under the direction, as Principal, of a sport psychologist and former physical education lecturer, Professor John Kane OBE, and a geographer Murie Robertson, who served as Vice-Principal. It awarded undergraduate degrees (CNAA) and HNDs, and continued to train teachers, being, for example, a specialist 'Wing College' for Physical Education. Operating over two campuses, one on St. Margarets Road in East Twickenham, alongside the River Thames, and the other immediately south of the Great West Road in Osterley. The Borough Road name persisted on the rugby field and the institute's sports strip.

== The 1980s ==
By the 1980s, the degree and diploma programmes at WLIHE were being delivered through various disciplines. The Borough Road College campus in Osterley was home to American Studies, English Literature, History, Religious Studies, Geography, Geology, Business Studies, Physiotherapy, Occupational Therapy, Social Work, and Sports Studies, while the Arts, Music, and Education were clustered two miles away at the old Maria Grey College site in East Twickenham. For several years, the Colleges were affiliated with The University of London's Institute of Education and offered University of London degree courses.

By the 1990s, the courses offered mainly were joint honours awards in various combinations including: American Studies, Drama, Art, French, Business Studies, English Literature, Geography, Geology, History, Religious Studies, Music and Sports Studies, plus single-honours degrees in physiotherapy, Occupational Therapy, and Social Work. By the 1990s, a few Masters programmes were also offered; for example, in Sport Sciences (the first in Greater London), Social Work, and Environmental Change. A small number of PhDs were also awarded across the disciplines.

The British and Foreign School Society kept an archive and ran a National Religious Education Centre on the Osterley site. The Twickenham site also hosted a ballet school, the Rambert.

In 1986 plans were unveiled to merge Ealing Technical College with the Institute from September 1987. The enlarged institution would seek Polytechnic status. However, the 1988 Education Reform Act granted independence from local councils to more than 70 polytechnics and higher education colleges throughout the country, making the move unnecessary for ETC, which went on to become Thames Valley University.

For its size and status (Higher Education colleges in the UK were not expected to be high research performers), the Institute performed relatively well in research, with several departments achieving national recognition in the Research Assessment Exercises of the 1980s and 1990s (1992 result here) – WLIHE also did well in the 1996 assessment – and a few staff held national research awards from the ESRC and other bodies.

== The merger with Brunel University London (BUL) ==
A new merger approach by the Vice-Chancellor of Brunel University London, Professor Michael Sterling, in the early 1990s went amicably – WLIHE had expertise and subject areas that BUL did not. In 1995 WLIHE ceased to exist. For the next two years, its campuses and departments were known as Brunel University College, under the stewardship of a Provost, Prof. Eric Billett. This status prevailed for about six years before BUL decided to centralise all its operations on its Uxbridge campus, 8 miles away. By this time, many departments had already moved from Osterley to Uxbridge.

The East Twickenham campus of the Institute, which contained several older buildings and had a riverfront location, was sold off in 2005 and was largely demolished and converted into luxury housing. Its central building, Gordon House, was on the market for two years at £15,000,000 after being sold once. It has been renamed Richmond House, even though it is not in Richmond.

== Alumni ==
- Denys Baptiste, Jazz musician (tenor saxophone) and composer
- Steve Bates, England Rugby international scrum-half (1989)
- Nigel Bevan, GB Olympic Games (1982) Javelin
- Kevin Bowring, Wales National Rugby Union coach (1995–98); RFU Director of Professional Coach Development (2002–16)
- Judith Burne, GB Rowing, Coxless Four, World Championships (1985 & 1986) & Commonwealth Games Gold medal (1986)
- Dave Collins, Professor in Human Performance Science, Edinburgh University; GB Athletics Performance Director, Olympics 2008; Sport Psychologist for British Weightlifting, Short Track Speed Skating, Skeleton, Judo, Curling and Athletics, plus New Zealand Ski and Snowboard, in attendance at 14 Olympic Games and numerous World/Commonwealth/European Championships/Games; played American Football for GB.
- Garry Cook, GB Olympic Games Silver medalist, 4 × 400 m (1984), and World Championships 800m (1983)
- Greg Davies, stand-up comedian and actor
- Abi Ekoku, CEO and Rugby League player, Bradford Bulls; Discus thrower, UK Champion, GB/England – European Championships/Commonwealth Games
- Justin Fitzpatrick, Ireland Rugby international prop forward (1998-03)
- Brett Garrard, GB & England Hockey international, Olympian (2000 & 2004); GB and England's most capped player
- Julian Golley, GB Olympic Games (1992) & England Commonwealth Games Gold medalist (1994) Triple Jump
- Audley Harrison, GB Olympic Games (2000), Gold medal, Boxing (Super-heavyweight division)
- Mark Hatton, GB Winter Olympian (2002 & 2006) Luge
- Dave Heaven, Jazz guitarist
- Toby Hessian, GB Rowing Lightweight Coxless Fours, World Championships Gold Medal (1991)
- Richard Hill, British & Irish Lions (1997)/England Rugby international (1997-09); World Cup winner with England 2003; currently the England National Rugby Union Team Manager
- Patricia Hodge, actor; Olivier Award 2000
- Julie Hollman, GB Olympic Heptathlete (2008), World Championships (2003) and England Commonwealth Games (2002 & 2006)
- Paul Honeyford, author and linguist
- Eddie van Hoof, GB Gymnastics, Olympic Games (1984) & UK Coach of the Year 2016
- Ben Johnston, England Rugby international centre three-quarter (2002)
- Alex King, England Rugby international fly-half (1997-03)
- John Mallet, England Rugby international prop forward (1995)
- Mark Naylor, GB High Jump, Olympics (1980 & 1984)
- John Olver, England Rugby international hooker (1990–92)
- Kevin O'Sullivan, Psychologist, Therapist and author (1979-1981)
- David Ottley, GB Javelin, Olympics Silver medal (1984), Commonwealth Games Gold medal (1986) & World Championships (1987)
- Mark Pearn, GB & England Hockey international; Olympian (2000 & 2004)
- Bernard Pitt, British teacher, poet and army officer
- Courtney Rumbolt, GB Four-man Bobsleigh, Bronze medalist, Winter Olympics (1994)
- Kathy Smallwood-Cook, 13 medals at the Olympics, World Championships, European Championships, and Commonwealth Games in Athletics (sprints; 1978–84)
- Kelly Sotherton, Bronze medalist in Heptathlon at Olympic Games and Gold at the Commonwealth Games
- Paul Stimpson, GB & England Basketball, played over 120 times for GB and England and captained England
- Linda Strachan, GB Fencing (Foil), Olympic Games 1988 & 1992
- Ian Taylor, GB Hockey goalkeeper and Olympic Gold medalist (1988)
- Iwan Thomas, Silver medalist for 400 m at the Commonwealth Games (2002); European 400 m champion (1998), Gold medalist in the 4 × 400 m relay at the European Championships (1998); Silver medallist in the 4 × 400 m relay at the Olympics (1996) and a member of the winning 4 × 400 m relay team at the World Championships (1997); current TV presenter
- Darren Treasure, Sport Psychologist & High Performance Director for the Nike Oregon Project
- Ian Tullett, GB & England Pole Vault; Silver medalist, Commonwealth Games (1990)
- Jeremy West, GB Canoeing, Olympic Games & two gold medals at the World Championships (1986)
- Anthony Whiteman, GB Olympian (1996 & 2000); winner of the 1500 m, World University Games 1997; Master's world record holder for 800 m
- Alan Whitwell, GB Rowing, three Olympic Games, Silver medal Men's Eight (1980), & World Championships, Lightweight Double Sculls Gold medallist (1986)
- Jason Wing, GB Four-man Bobsleigh, Winter Olympics (1994), & European Championships Silver medalist (1994)
- Greg Whyte (sportsman), GB Modern Pentathlon Olympian (1992 & 1996), won World Championship silver & European bronze (1991); Professor of Applied Sport & Exercise Science, Liverpool John Moores University

Former notable staff include:

- Simon Batterbury, geographer, University of Melbourne
- Gavin D'Costa theologian, University of Bristol
- Andrew Cundy, Chair in Environmental Radiochemistry, University of Southampton
- Danny Kerry, GB Women's Hockey Head Coach, led the team to Olympic Gold medal (2016)
- Théodore Macdonald, polymath health promotion professor, medical doctor, mathematician and human rights activist; (1933-2011)
- Bill McGuire, University College London, geologist, TV presenter and author
- Alan Pascoe, European & Commonwealth Gold Medallist, and Olympic Games finalist, 400m Hurdles; Olympic Silver medalist, 4 × 400 m relay; Vice-chair of the London 2012 Olympic bid
- Iain Stewart, Royal Scientific Society in Jordan, earth sciences television presenter and geologist
