= Amy Yoder Begley =

American runner (born 1978)

Personal information
- Born: January 11, 1978 (age 48) Topeka, Indiana, U.S.
- Height: 5 ft 4 in (163 cm)
- Weight: 116 lb (53 kg)
- Website: amybegley.com

Sport
- Country: United States
- Events: 3000 m, 5000 m, 10,000 m
- College team: Arkansas Razorbacks (1997–01)
- Club: Atlanta Track Club
- Coached by: Andrew Begley

Achievements and titles
- Olympic finals: 2008 10000 m, 26th
- World finals: 2009 10000 m, 6th
- Personal bests: 3000 m: 8:53.27 5000 m: 14:56.72 10000 m: 31:13.78

Amy Yoder Begley (née Yoder; born January 11, 1978) is an American running coach and former middle and long-distance runner. Yoder Begley was a national champion at three different distances (3k indoor, 10k road, 15k road) and competed in the 10,000 meter event at the 2008 Summer Olympics in Beijing.

== High school career ==
Yoder Begley attended East Noble High School in Kendallville, Indiana. She was a four-time state champion (one cross country and three 3200 meter titles) and held the 3200 meter state record from 1996 until 2011 when it was broken by Culver Academy's Waverly Neer.

== Collegiate career ==
Yoder Begley graduated from the University of Arkansas in 2001. She was a two-time NCAA champion and a 15-time All-American. She was 2000 SEC Female Athlete of the Year, and in 2016 she was selected to the Southeastern Conference 2016 Class of Women's Legends representing Arkansas. She won the Honda Sports Award as the nation's top female cross country runner in 2000.

== Professional career ==
Yoder Begley was a Nike Oregon Project athlete from 2007 to 2011. She trained with Galen Rupp, Kara Goucher, Adam Goucher, and Josh Rohatinsky under coach Alberto Salazar, who was later banned for life.

Yoder Begley placed third in the 10,000 meters at the 2008 USA Track & Field Olympic Trials in Eugene, Oregon, setting a new personal record of 31:43.60 and qualifying for the 2008 Summer Olympics in Beijing. She placed 26th in the final of the 10,000 meters at the Olympics.

Yoder Begley finished first in the 10,000 meter event at the 2009 USA Track & Field Championship on June 25, 2009, in Eugene, Oregon. This qualified her to compete in the 12th IAAF World Championships in Athletics held in Berlin. She finished in sixth place and set a new personal record with a time of 31:13.78.

In 2013, she became the women's cross country coach and women's track and field assistant coach at the University of Connecticut.

In December 2014 she was hired as the first full-time coach in the 50-year history of the Atlanta Track Club. Among her responsibilities are creating training programs for the club's 21,000 members and training two athletes for the 2020 Summer Olympics. The club announced they were separating from Yoder Begley and her husband in 2023.

In 2019, Yoder Begley made substantiated allegations against Alberto Salazar for abuse pertaining to her body and ultimately kicking her off the team for her weight. She also alleged that Salazar made her sign a contract saying she wouldn't become friends with any of her teammates at the Nike Oregon Project.

Yoder Begley was hired by USATF in 2023 as the director of long-distance running programs. She founded and mentors the Heartland Athletics Club, coached by Andrew Begley and Bianca Martin with athletes Allie Wilson, Emma Grace Hurley, and Gemma Finch.

=== Highlights ===
- 15-Time NCAA All-American in Cross Country and Track
- 2-Time NCAA National Champion in Track
- 2000 USA Olympic Trials Qualifier
- 2000 Honda Sports Award winner for cross country
- 2001 Avon National 10k Champion
- 2002 United States Team Member - Beijing Ekiden
- 2002 RRCA Road Scholar Grant Recipient
- 2002 Avon Global Championships Runner-up
- 2004 USA Olympic Trials Qualifier
- 2004 USATF 10k Road National Champion
- 2008 US Olympic Team, 10k
- 2009 USATF Indoor 3k champion
- 2009 USA 15k Championship - 1st Place
- 2009 USA Outdoor Track and Field Championships 10k, 1st place. Set personal and track record with a time of 31:22.69
- 2009 World Championships in Athletics 10k, 6th place.

== Personal life ==
In 2006, Yoder Begley was diagnosed with celiac disease.

She married her husband Andrew Begley in 2000; Begley is also a running coach and partner of Yoder Begley with the Heartland Athletics Club. In 2020, Yoder Begley announced she and her husband had a commitment ceremony with their mutual partner of three years, Stephanie Reynolds Begley.

== See also ==
- List of people diagnosed with coeliac disease
