= Darren Treasure =

Sport consultant

Darren Treasure is an Australian sport performance consultant and former academic. He served as the High Performance Director for the Nike Oregon Project, where he worked with coach Alberto Salazar and elite distance runners including Kara Goucher, Alan Webb, and Galen Rupp.

Following the closure of the Oregon Project in 2019, Treasure became the subject of public scrutiny after former athletes, including Mary Cain and Goucher, alleged that he shared confidential conversations with Salazar and that athletes believed he was the team's sports psychologist despite not being a licensed psychologist. Treasure has denied improperly breaching confidentiality and has stated that he never claimed to be a licensed psychologist.

Treasure was a tenured associate professor at Arizona State University, with appointments in the Department of Kinesiology and the Department of Psychology. He also held faculty positions at the University of Illinois at Urbana-Champaign and Southern Illinois University Edwardsville. From 2005 to 2009, he led a high-performance initiative in the athletic department at the University of California, Berkeley and authored the National Federation of State High School Associations coaching education program Fundamentals of Coaching.

== Nike Oregon Project ==
In 2019 Sports Illustrated published an article about the toxic culture at the Nike Oregon Project that Treasure was a part of:

In May 2015, Cain spiraled into depression and self-harm. This is when, she recounted to the Times, she struggled in a 1,500-meter race at Occidental College and Salazar weight-shamed her in front of other track-meet participants after the race. That same night, the 19-year-old informed Salazar and Darren Treasure that she was cutting herself. She says they ignored this cry for help.

The article also mentions that athletes in the project were told Treasure was a Sports Psychologist but learned later he was not a licensed. Runners in the group confided in him and later would learn he shared details from their sessions with Salazar and the other runners.

“Everything I told Darren in confidence, Alberto would talk to me about later,” Olympic distance runner Kara Goucher, who left the Oregon Project in 2011 before blowing the whistle on possible anti-doping offenses there, says. “Darren would tell me things that my teammates were saying to me in confidence. I was privy to other people’s personal thoughts and secrets that they would tell Darren, and I would be told about them. Openly, he and Alberto would laugh about stuff going on with other people. It makes me really ashamed, actually. Nothing was secret.”
