= Mary Pilon =

American journalist

- Born: May 16, 1986 (age 40); Eugene, Oregon, U.S.
- Occupations: Journalist; Writer; Director; Producer
- Notable work: The Monopolists; The Kevin Show; Losers; The Longest Race

Mary Pilon (born 16 May 1986 in Eugene, Oregon) is an American journalist and filmmaker who primarily covers sports and business. A regular contributor to the New Yorker and Bloomberg Businessweek, her books are The Monopolists (2015), The Kevin Show (2018), Losers: Dispatches From the Other Side of the Scoreboard (2020, with Louisa Thomas), and The Longest Race, co-authored with Olympian Kara Goucher. She has also worked as a staff reporter covering sports for The New York Times and business at The Wall Street Journal and has also written and produced for Vice, Esquire, NBC News, among other outlets.

At the Times, Pilon authored a story that was the first-ever graphic novel for the paper and its first audiobook, "Tomato Can Blues," a true-crime story of Charles Rowan; it was narrated by actor Bobby Cannavale.

She is an adjunct professor at NYU's Carter Institute of Journalism, where she teaches a graduate-level investigative reporting class.

== Early life and education ==
Born and raised in Eugene, Oregon, Pilon attended Winston Churchill High School. She first reported for her hometown newspaper, The Register-Guard, as a teenager. She then attended New York University, as a member of the graduating class of 2008 with a degree in politics and journalism. Pilon's senior thesis on the people and politics of methamphetamine trafficking won the school's Edwin Diamond Award.

== Career ==
Pilon has worked for Dow Jones, USA Today and New York Magazine and, from 2006 to 2008, Gawker. From 2008 to 2011, she reported for the Wall Street Journal Money and Investing Section on finance and Wall Street during the 2008 financial crisis, one of the youngest reporters on staff. She won the 2011 Gerald Loeb Award for Breaking News for her coverage of the 2010 Flash Crash.

At the Times, Pilon wrote "Tomato Can Blues," a true-crime story of Charles Rowan, an amateur cage fighter who faked his own death. The story was the first-ever graphic novel for the paper and the first audiobook, narrated by actor Bobby Cannavale.

Pilon's 2016 investigative reporting on sexual harassment in the trucking industry helped fuel a class action lawsuit by women truckers. In reporting on the NFL's domestic violence policies for Bleacher Report/CNN the next year, the writer found that the league seldom enforced its own policies. She has also reported on the circumstances surrounding runner Steve Prefontaine`s death for ESPN's Grantland. She also was among the first to report on Donald Trump's immigrant mother in June 2016. At Vice, Pilon reported on legal issues faced by transgender high school athletes and at NBC News, how coaches accused of sexual abuse continued to work in sports.

Her New Yorker contributions focus on the legal and financial aspects of sports. Pilon has also written for Vice, Esquire, Fast Company, Smithsonian magazine, and NBC Sports.

On 17 February 2015, Bloomsbury released her first book, The Monopolists: Obsession, Fury, and the Scandal Behind the World's Favorite Board Game, which tells the true story of the board game Monopoly. Pilon spent more than five years investigating the game's origins, which date back to feminist Lizzie Magie and the Progressive Era. The book discusses economics professor Ralph Anspach's decade-long legal battle over the rights to his own game, Anti-Monopoly, as well as his efforts to uncover Magie as the game's true inventor, even as Parker Brothers had incorrectly claimed that a man, Charles Darrow, had invented the game during the Great Depression. (Magie died in 1948 in obscurity, working as a secretary in Washington, D.C., and made $500 off her invention.) The book was a New York Times bestseller and was named by the Times to its annual list of notable books that year. It received positive reviews in Slate, the Los Angeles Times, the New Republic, and the Boston Globe, among others. Journalist Gay Talese said that Pilon "writes with the assurance and energy of a historian who knows she has struck gold."

As a result of Pilon's reporting, Magie and Ralph Anspach's lawsuit and efforts to unearth her story have resulted in Magie being acknowledged by a variety of news outlets, academics, the National Women's History Museum, and as a Jeopardy! clue. The book has been translated into several languages and is currently in development as a feature film by the production company behind Little Miss Sunshine and Adaptation. Pilon and The Monopolists were also the subject of a February 2023 episode of PBS’s American Experience on the game.

The Kevin Show: An Olympic Athlete's Battle with Mental Illness tells the true story of Olympic and America's Cup sailor Kevin Hall, who has battled a rare form of bipolar disorder known as The Truman Show delusion. The book, released by Bloomsbury in March 2018, was a four-year culmination of reporting on Hall's delusions, the reality of being an Olympian, and an examination of mental illness. The book was also a national bestseller and received positive reviews. Kirkus Reviews called it "grippingly provocative reading" and psychiatrist Dr. Edward Hallowell called it "spellbinding" and "brilliant."

In 2019, Pilon co-wrote and co-hosted a podcast on the USA Gymnastics sex abuse scandal with her Times colleague, Carla Correa, on Audible. The series traced the systemic errors that led to Larry Nassar’s serial abuse, including failures by the Federal Bureau of Investigation and other law enforcement agencies in ignoring complaints about Nassar.

In March 2023, Pilon and Olympian Kara Goucher published The Longest Race, a memoir of Goucher’s running career. It revealed for the first time her experiences with the Nike Oregon Project, including allegations of doping and sexual abuse involving longtime Nike coach Alberto Salazar. As a result of Goucher’s testimony, Salazar received a lifetime ban from the sport. The book debuted at No. 7 on the Times bestseller list.

== Books ==
- The Monopolists: Obsession, Fury, and the Scandal Behind the World's Favorite Board Game, 2015
- The Kevin Show: An Olympic Athlete's Battle with Mental Illness, 2018
- Losers: Dispatches From the Other Side of the Scoreboard, edited with Louisa Thomas, 2020
- The Longest Race, with Kara Goucher, 2023

== Film and streaming ==
Pilon has also appeared in and produced several documentaries, including HBO's Class Action Park. She served as story editor for HBO's BS High in 2023, which was a Tribeca Film Festival Selection. Pilon is co-directing a documentary about pickleball for Peter Berg's Film 45.

=== Director ===
Year	Title	Notes
	Documentary about pickleball	co-directing with Seth Porges

=== Story editor ===
- ‘’BS High’’ (HBO, 2023)

=== Producer ===
Year	Title	Notes
2023	Time of Essence	
2016	Rio 2016 Olympic Games Closing Ceremony	
2016	Rio 2016: Games of the XXXI Olympiad	

=== Appearances ===
Year	Title	Role	Notes
2023	Ruthless: Monopoly’s Secret History	Self	
2020	Class Action Park	Self	

== Personal life ==
Pilon has cited her upbringing in Eugene and early love of comic books among her inspirations. She took a Greyhound to New York City and now lives in Brooklyn.
