= Lilian Kasait Rengeruk =

Kenyan long-distance runner

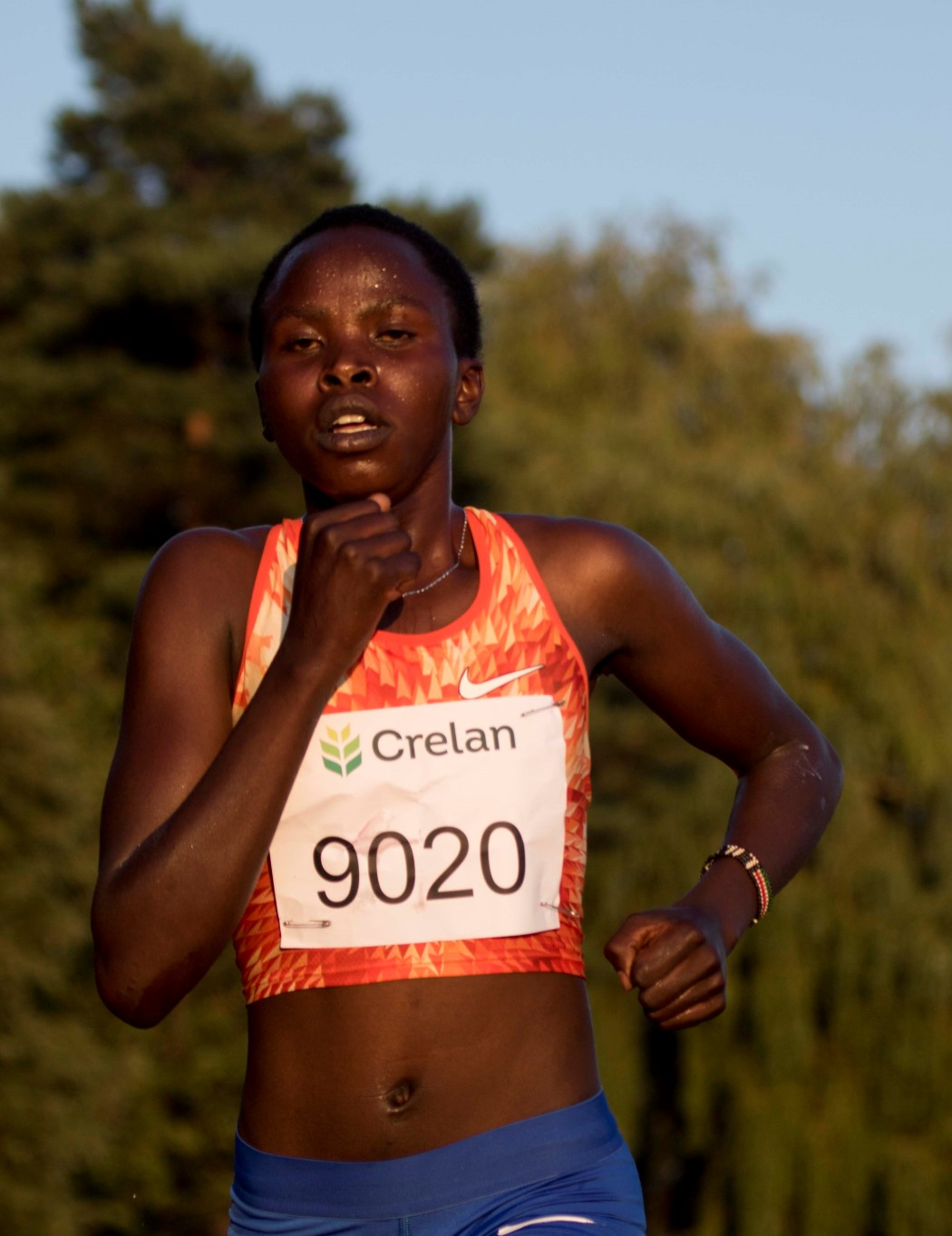
- Rengeruk in 2017

Personal information
- Nationality: Kenyan
- Born: 3 May 1997 (age 29) West Pokot County, Kenya

Sport
- Country: Kenya
- Sport: Track and field
- Event: Long-distance running
Medal record
Women's athletics
Representing Kenya
African Games
| Gold medal – first place | 2019 Rabat | 5000 m |
World U20 Championships
| Silver medal – second place | 2014 Eugene | 3000 m |
World Youth Championships
| Gold medal – first place | 2013 Donetsk | 3000 m |
World Cross Country Championships
| Bronze medal – third place | 2017 Kampala | Senior race |
| Gold medal – first place | 2017 Kampala | Senior team |
| Silver medal – second place | 2019 Aarhus | Senior team |
World Road Running Championships
| Silver medal – second place | 2023 Riga | 5K |

Lilian Kasait Rengeruk (born 3 May 1997, Keiyo District) is a Kenyan female long-distance runner. She won the bronze medal in the women's senior race at the 2017 World Cross Country Championships. Rengeruk is the former 3000 metres World Under-18 champion and World U20 Championship silver medallist.

In September 2022, Rengeruk was banned for 10 months commencing April of that year due to the use of hormone therapy drug.

== Career ==
Rengeruk had her first successes in 2013, winning the Kenyan youth trials race before beating Ethiopia's Berhan Demiesa to take the 3000 metres title at the 2013 World Youth Championships in Athletics. The following year she placed fifth in the junior race at the African Cross Country Championships, sharing in the team gold. She pre-fixed a win at the Kenyan junior trials with a 3000 m best of 8:53.41 minutes on her IAAF Diamond League debut in Doha. At the 2014 World Junior Championships in Athletics, however, she was outdone by American home athlete Mary Cain, leaving Rengeruk with the silver medal.

Rengeruk's 2015 season was prematurely curtailed and she did not fare well at the 2016 African Cross Country Championships, managing only tenth in the junior race that year. She failed to make the top three at the Kenyan junior track trials that June. She emerged a much improved athlete in 2017 running in the senior ranks, starting with runner-up finishes at the Discovery Cross Country and the Kenyan Cross Country Championships; she was the only athlete to keep pace with Irene Chepet Cheptai in the national race. The Kenyan women's team was very strong for the 2017 IAAF World Cross Country Championships and Rengeruk took the bronze medal in the senior race as part of a Kenyan sweep of the top six places, where Cheptai was the victor. Although Rengeruk won the 5000 metres at the Kenyan Police Championships and the Kenyan Athletics Championships, she missed out on World Championships selection at the trials meet. She did perform well on the Diamond League circuit, having her first top three finish at the Prefontaine Classic in a personal best of 14:36.80 min, as well as setting a best of 8:32.73 min in the 3000 m at the Herculis meet.

She opened her 2017–18 cross country season with wins at the Tuskys Wareng Cross Country and Campaccio.

In 2019, she competed in the senior women's race at the 2019 IAAF World Cross Country Championships held in Aarhus, Denmark. She finished in 12th place.

=== Doping ban ===
In September 2022, it was announced that Rengeruk had been banned from athletics for a period of 10 months commencing April 2022 for the use of hormone therapy drug Letrozole.

== Personal bests ==
- 3000 metres – 8:28.96 (2021)
- 5000 metres – 14:23.05 (2023)

== International competitions ==
Representing Kenya
| Year | Competition | Venue | Position | Event | Notes |
|---|---|---|---|---|---|
| 2013 | World Youth Championships | Donetsk, Ukraine | 1st | 3000 m | 8:58.74 |
| 2014 | African Cross Country Championships | Kampala, Uganda | 5th | Junior race | 19:51 |
| 2014 | African Cross Country Championships | Kampala, Uganda | 1st | Junior team | 13 pts |
| 2014 | World Junior Championships | Eugene, United States | 2nd | 3000 m | 9:00.53 |
| 2016 | African Cross Country Championships | Yaoundé, Cameroon | 10th | Junior race | 19,48 |
| 2017 | World Cross Country Championships | Kampala, Uganda | 3rd | Senior race | 32:11 |
| 2017 | World Cross Country Championships | Kampala, Uganda | 1st | Senior team | 10 pts |
| 2018 | African Championships | Asaba, Nigeria | 5th | 5000 m | 16:04.51 |
| 2019 | World Cross Country Championships | Aarhus, Denmark | 12th | Senior race | 37:35 |
| 2019 | World Cross Country Championships | Aarhus, Denmark | 2nd | Senior team | 25 pts |
| 2019 | African Games | Rabat, Morocco | 1st | 5000 m | 15:33.63 |
| 2019 | World Athletics Championships | Doha, Qatar | 5th | 5000 m | 14:36.05 |
| 2021 | Olympic Games | Tokyo, Japan | 12th | 5000 m | 14:55.85 |
| 2023 | World Championships | Budapest, Hungary | 10th | 5000 m | 14:59.32 |
| 2024 | Olympic Games | Paris, France | 5th | 10,000 m | 30:45.04 |

== Circuit wins, and National titles ==
- Diamond League
  - 2018: London Anniversary Games (3000 m)
- Kenyan Athletics Championships
  - 5000 metres: 2017
