= Bernard Pitt =

British army officer and poet (1881–1916)

- Pitt in army uniform
- Born: 19 June 1881
- Died: 30 April 1916 (aged 34) near Arras, France
- Education: Borough Road College
- Spouse: Florence Mary
- Children: 4
- Military career
- Branch: British Army
- Service years: 1915–1916
- Rank: Second lieutenant
- Units: Border Regiment and 47th Trench Mortar Battery
- Known for: Writing
- Conflicts: First World War
- Awards: Mention in despatches
- Memorials: Arras Memorial

Second Lieutenant Bernard Pitt (19 June 1881 – 30 April 1916) was a British teacher, army officer and poet. He attended Borough Road College from 1901 to 1903 to train as a teacher and remained at the institution to study for degrees in languages and literature. Pitt taught at the King's School in Kew, Sir Joseph Williamson's Mathematical School in Rochester, Kent, and Coopers' Company School in Bow, London. From 1912 he taught a degree-level course in English literature at the Working Men's College in St Pancras. Pitt began a study of Anglo-Saxon literature in 1914 but left this to join the British Army and fight in the First World War.

Pitt served briefly with the Volunteer Training Corps before being commissioned into the Border Regiment. He served with them in France before being detached to the 47th Trench Mortar Battery. He was killed in action while directing the fire of his battery near Arras. After his death, a collection of his letters and poetry written on the Western Front was published and a colleague completed and published the work on Anglo-Saxon literature.

== Early life and career ==
Pitt was born on 19 June 1881 to Abraham Robert Pitt and his wife, Annie, in Chiswick; in 1901 the family were living at 91 Murray Road, Brentford. He went to the Isleworth Blue School. He studied at Borough Road College, a teaching college in Isleworth, between 1901 and 1903. The college's records state that Pitt's attitude to study was "not very satisfactory", though he graduated with a class 1 teachers certificate and excelled in chemistry, physiology and agriculture. Pitt afterwards remained at the college and received a Bachelor of Arts degree in languages and, in 1911, a Master of Arts degree in literature, both accredited by the University of London. Pitt married Florence Mary Miller (b 1878, Islington) at St John's Church, Waterloo, on 17 April 1906; they were both living at 94 Cornwall Road. They went on to have four children. In 1911 they were living in Strood, Kent.

Pitt became a master (teacher) at the King's School in Kew, Sir Joseph Williamson's Mathematical School in Rochester, Kent and Coopers' Company School in Bow, London. From 1912 he additionally taught English literature at the Working Men's College in St Pancras, London. His classes at the college were honours degree-level courses of three years' duration. Pitt's students' essays were compared favourably by Arthur Smith of Balliol College to the work done at the University of Oxford.

In the winter of 1914/15, Pitt worked with Alfred J. Wyatt on a review of Anglo-Saxon literature. Before the conclusion of the work, Pitt decided to join the British Army, noting at the time that "all is naught compared with the war". The Anglo-Saxon study was completed by Wyatt and published as An Anglo-Saxon Reader in 1919.

== First World War ==
Pitt initially joined the Volunteer Training Corps but later joined the main British Army. He was commissioned as a second lieutenant into the Border Regiment on 1 April 1915. He served with the regiment's 10th (Reserve) Battalion, part of Kitchener's Army. Pitt was deployed to France in December 1915, serving initially near Béthune. He described seeing heavy fighting and being recommended for the Military Cross but was granted the lower honour of a mention in despatches instead.

Pitt was attached to the 47th Trench Mortar Battery from February 1916. Pitt was killed in action on 30 April 1916 near Arras. He had been observing the fall of shells from his battery and correcting their fire when a German mine exploded under his position. Unusually for a time when next of kin were given sanitised versions of their loved ones' deaths, Pitt's widow, who was living in Hounslow, was told that his body was destroyed by the explosion and no trace of him could be found. Pitt's brigadier-general described him as the "embodiment of dash and pluck ... whenever the Germans appeared to be getting particularly annoyed, the men would say 'oh, it's that little trench mortar officer at them with his guns'". At the time of Pitt's death, he was about to be appointed as a staff officer. His formal transfer to the General List for service with the trench mortar battery came on 30 May 1916.

Pitt was a prolific letter writer and poet during his time on the front; these were collected and published after his death. His letters have been described as varying between being as idealistic as Rupert Brooke and as resentful of the war as Siegfried Sassoon. Two days before his death, Pitt had enjoyed a 24-hour rest period and wrote home while sitting under a walnut tree near a ruined village, noting the beauty of the blossoming fruit trees, flowers and wildlife.

== Works ==
- Pitt, Bernard (1917). Essays, Poems, Letters. London: Francis Edwards.

== Poetry ==
Ballade of the Joy of Spring.
Love, at this time, when March and April meet,
March, wielder of the east-wind, loth to go,
And oft returning with his frost and sleet
To blight rathe buds or beat them to and fro;
April, capricious maiden, all too slow
To please her plumed harbingers, who sing —
Lark, linnet, nightingale—in fervent flow,
"O lovely life, O living love of spring."

When the brown earth is bright with emerald wheat,
And by your lawn the almond-branches show
Encrimsoned cusps, that, opening to the heat
Unfold in curves of pearl and shining snow,
When crocus-chalices upraised a-row
Catch golden bounty from the sun, their king,
And west-winds breathe, and whisper as they blow
"O lovely life, O living love of spring."

Does not the swift free season tempt thy feet
To banks where daffodil and kingcup grow,
To odorous dells where violets are sweet,
To meadows where the hands of April strove
Full many a burnished buttercup, and sow
Blue speedwell for a vernal jewelling ?
Elfin charactery that spells, I trow,
"O lovely life, O living love of spring."

The Spring thy lover is: right well I know
For thee with bird and bloom the thickets ring
The meadows brighten; thou art praised so,
"O lovely life, O living love of spring."

The Wood of Souchez
The coppices by Aylesford are beautiful in Spring:
Anemone and primrose delay the careless breeze,
The throstles try their grace-notes while woodland freshets sing,
The dewy catkins glisten on the virgin-slender trees,
And England, my dear country, has many walks like these.

No flower blooms in the ruins of this accursed wood:
Through writhen splintered branches the shrapnel bullets hiss,
There is no leafy nook where a bird may rear her brood,
The reek of rotten flesh taints the pools where water is.
But England, my dear country, shall know no wood like this.

Kew Gardens in the Winter
Fair-weather friends forget their vows,
And they who praised your summer state
Leave your wet ways and misty boughs
All desolate.
I watched your virginal harebells rive
The woodlands into lanes of blue;
Now that are none of them alive
To comfort you.
O princely beeches, august limes
In your high senatorial row,
Cedars that lift in these grey times
Your shelves of snow,
You are not left alone to meet
Adversity till Winter end;
I pace your walks with faithful feet,
Your guest, your friend

Kew Gardens in April
While the trees roll in the wind,
While balm-laden poplars breathe
All their incense intertwined
With the sunshot webs of rain,
Come and watch young April wreathe
His sweet sorceries again.
Still he works the same dear wiles
As he plumes the fledgling boughs,
Still he turns his frowns to smiles
Teaching birds their shakes and trills,
Still, to spite the rose, endows
All the woods with daffodils.

Kew Gardens in July
There is no sound from this odorous hollow,
Mute in an ecstacy, dumb with a prayer,
Silent with all adorations that follow—
Follow and lose, up the passionate air,
The sun's bright step, the ethereal stair.
Colours exultant and odours that languish,
Sighs that are songs of a joy at the height,
Poised on the breath between rapture and anguish—
Poised In the melting of touch into sight,
Where all is one and the one is one Light.
Life that aspires and desires, and desiring
Leaps and resurges through spirit and flesh,
Life that desires and aspires, and aspiring
Slips the bond, moves the bourne, loosens the mesh,
Transmutes the made in the Maker afresh.
All things that live in this odorous hollow :
Trees that lift hands to the dominant sun,
Grasses and flowers and my heart—feel and follow—
Follow the pulse of the web that is spun
From thought and atom, and know themselves One.

== Legacy ==
He is commemorated on the war memorial at St Anne's Church, Kew, the Borough Road College, Isleworth, roll of honour and on the Arras Memorial. The Working Men's College named a room after him.
