= Honeyford =

Honeyford is a surname. Notable people with the surname include:

- David Honeyford, Northern Irish politician
- Jim Honeyford (born 1939), American politician
- Paul Honeyford (born 1958), English biographer
- Ray Honeyford (1934–2012), British headmaster

== See also ==
- Gloria Hunniford (born 1940) Northern Irish television presenter
