= Paul Stenning =

English author (born 1976)

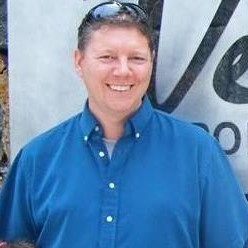
- Stenning in Mauritius, 2019
- Born: Paul David Stenning; 12 June 1976 (age 50); Brighton, East Sussex, England
- Education: Urmston Grammar
- Occupation: Writer
- Children: 1
- Writing career
- Period: 1990s–present
- Genres: Biography; poetry; criticism

Paul David Stenning (born 12 June 1976) is an English author and ghostwriter. He has written twenty-nine books, of fiction, non-fiction, poetry and biography. The best-known of his books is The Robert Pattinson Album, a biography of Robert Pattinson, first published in 2009 and appearing in seven languages since then.

== Early life ==
Stenning was born in Brighton in East Sussex. His family moved to Manchester when he was eight years old. Stenning attended Urmston Grammar School amongst others, including Bury Church of England High School.

== Take That and early career ==
Stenning wrote poetry through his late teens and submitted his first poem in late 1999, which was published as part of an anthology titled Magical Memories, a year later.

During this time he worked for Take That as assistant to their financial advisor Simon Orange, the brother of Jason Orange. During his time working at the office in Cheadle he had an accident where he fell through a roof inside the building and was almost electrocuted.

He also worked as a DJ, often playing sets before live concerts, particularly before shows at the Manchester Apollo.

== Periodical Journalism ==
Stenning has said music was his first love and he wrote music reviews for fun during his teens. In the mid-1990s he submitted reviews to Metal Hammer where he soon became a regular contributor. Other music magazines he wrote for included Rolling Stone, Record Collector, Metal Maniacs, Decibel, BraveWords, Terrorizer and Alternative Press. He has also written for FHM, Front and, after moving to Cyprus in 2008, the Cyprus Weekly. He continues to contribute to Record Collector most recently interviewing Fish and writing on Gamble Rogers. Stenning contributed a piece to The Independent newspaper on the anniversary of Michael Hutchence's passing.

== Ghostwriter and author ==
Stenning's first book was on Guns N' Roses, an unofficial biography that was later cited as the most accurate book on the band by guitarist Slash.

He also wrote unofficial biographies of Iron Maiden, Metallica, My Chemical Romance, Rage Against the Machine and AC/DC. Stenning describes Tommy Vance and especially the Friday Rock Show as big influences on his early career. He dedicated his biographies of Iron Maiden and Slash to Vance.

He has conducted hundreds of interviews including Meat Loaf, Pete Best, Alice Cooper, Steve Guttenberg, Kathy Sledge, Peter Steele, John Myatt and Linda Hamilton. Stenning's interviews often run over the allotted time allowed. He spoke to Peter Steele and Leslie Easterbrook for almost 3 hours despite an interview restriction of an hour. Easterbrook told Stenning he asks "great questions". In 2006, Stenning interviewed Steven Adler live onstage at The Cavern Club in Liverpool.

After working on a biography of Robert Pattinson, Stenning focused on areas beyond music. Since 2009 he has worked primarily as a ghostwriter, working with Patty Schnyder, Jason Newsted, Frank Abagnale, Tomáš Berdych, Steven Adler, Adam Dubin, U.S. Marshals 15 Most Wanted Fugitives Jody K Thompson and British champion wrestler Ray Robinson.

In 2013 Stenning released Success – By Those Who've Made It, which featured Mario Andretti, Jörgen Elofsson, Ching He Huang, Cherie Lunghi, Roy 'Chubby' Brown, Greg Merson, Susan Polgar, Phil Gallagher aka Mister Maker and Penelope Spheeris. Anne Wafula Strike was the last personal biography featured in the book, which Stenning explained was because her story was the most powerful and the greatest example of success. After the book was released, Stenning gave talks on success at corporate events, festivals and schools.

Stenning's books have been released in multiple languages with several titles in Bulgarian, Polish and Portuguese.

Since 2018 he has been the official poet for the tourist board of Guinea-Bissau.

Stenning is the host of The Minder Podcast, launched in 2021. He also chaired a roundtable discussion for the Dragonfly podcast regarding the murder of Brett Cantor.

He was one of the authors involved with the Don't Steal This Book project; an empty book from almost 10,000 authors, protesting the theft of books by AI companies to train AI models.

== Personal life ==
Stenning has a wife and daughter. He travels around the world to ghostwrite and is based in the United States and Cyprus.

Stenning has been a campaigner for animal rights since his teens and is a vegetarian. He is a fan of the Baltimore Orioles, New York Giants and Pittsburgh Steelers.

== Bibliography ==
=== As official biographer or co-writer ===
- The White Mile (with Patty Schnyder, 2011)
- Nine Lives (with David S Gill, 2011)
- Ray Robinson – The Sheriff – My life fighting wrestlers, boxers, villains and cancer (Foreword by John H. Stracey, 2013)
- Success – By Those Who've Made It (with Frank Abagnale, Jason Newsted, DJ Jazzy Jeff, Leslie Easterbrook, Gregory Olsen, Tom Kerridge, 2013)
- Mark Gardiner – The Good, The Bad and The Lottery (2017)
- Antarctica – The Impossible Crossing? (with Geoff Somers MBE; forewords by Sir Ranulph Fiennes and Sir Chris Bonington, 2018)
- Flair Bartending: The Origins, The Golden Era, The Untold (with Tom Dyer and Marco Canova), 2026

=== As writer ===
- The Band That Time Forgot (history of Guns N' Roses, with foreword by Steven Adler, 2004)
- Maximum Rasmus (history of the band on audio CD, 2004)
- AC/DC: Two Sides To Every Glory (history of AC/DC, 2005)
- Maximum Velvet Revolver (history of the band on audio CD, 2005)
- My Chemical Romance: Something Incredible This Way Comes, (history of My Chemical Romance, 2006)
- Iron Maiden: 30 Years of the Beast (history of Iron Maiden, 2006)
- Slash: Surviving Guns N' Roses, Velvet Revolver And Rock's Snakepit, (biography of Slash, 2007)
- Thrash Metal – A Seemingly Endless Time, (History of the genre, featuring contributions from Scott Ian, Mille Petrozza, Martin Walkyier, Eric Peterson, 2007)
- Robert Plant: Led Zeppelin, Jimmy Page and the Solo Years, 2008
- Rage Against the Machine: Stage Fighters (history of Rage Against the Machine, 2008)
- The Robert Pattinson Album, (biography of Robert Pattinson, 2009)
- Waste Of Money! Overspending in Football – A Tragic Loss to the Beautiful Game, (Focus on Premier League and other football finances, 2010)
- Metallica: All That Matters, (history of Metallica 2010)
- Success – By Those Who've Made It (2013) (Featuring Mario Andretti, Tom Kerridge, Cherie Lunghi, Penelope Spheeris and more)
