= Bury Church of England High School =

Location
- Haslam Brow; Bury, Greater Manchester, BL9 0TS; England; 53.585381°N 2.304036°W

Information
- Type: Academy
- Motto: "Let your light shine" "Luceat Lux vestra"
- Religious affiliation: Church of England
- Established: 1748
- Founder: Hon Rev'd John Stanley
- Local authority: Bury
- Trust: The Bishop Fraser Trust
- Department for Education URN: 148866 Tables
- Ofsted: Reports
- Chair of local governing body: Liz Nicholls
- Head of school: Jon-Paul Craig
- Staff: 48
- Gender: Coeducational
- Age: 11 to 16
- Enrolment: 842
- Capacity: 842
- Colour: Navy blue Gold
- Website: www.burychurch.bury.sch.uk

Bury Church of England High School is a coeducational Church of England secondary school located just south of Bury town centre. The current head teacher is Jon-Paul Craig.

== School history ==
The school was founded as a charity school in 1748. In 1772 a building was built for the school in Clough Street. In 1814 it moved to Stanley Street. In 1887 it combined with the Irwell National School, and moved to Lower Bank Street. It became co-educational in 1892. In 1906 it was renamed Bury St. Mary's Parochial Church of England School, and in 1921 Church Central School. The school moved to its current location in 1964.

In 2009 the school was awarded Specialist Status in Humanities with the focus on geography, history and RE. Other awards include the Geographical Association Secondary Geography Quality Mark and the Schools Council International School Award (Full).

In March 2021 the School announced plans to become an academy and join the Bishop Fraser Trust. The school formally converted to academy status in January 2022.

== Curriculum ==
The school offers courses for both GCSEs and level 1 and 2 BTEC qualifications. All pupils study English, mathematics, science, French and religious studies to GCSE level. PE and PHSCE are compulsory (but unexamined) subjects at both KS3 and KS4. Optional subjects at GCSE in 2019 were: Art & Design, Computer Science, Drama, D&T, Food and Nutrition, Geography, German, History, Media studies, Music, PE, Spanish and Textiles (which was later removed). There is the option of studying separate sciences in place of the combined science GCSE. BTEC qualifications (taught in partnership with Bury College) are ICT.

== Sport ==
Sports played at the school, either in PE lessons or as extra curricular activities, include; athletics, association football, badminton, basketball, boxing, cricket, cross-country, hockey, netball, rounders, Rugby football, tennis, trampolining and volleyball.

== Notable former pupils ==
- Paul Stenning, biographer and ghostwriter
- Courtney Meppen-Walters, professional footballer
