= William Bateman Hall =

William Bateman Hall FREng (28 May 1923 – 6 August 2003) was a British nuclear engineer, and emeritus professor at the University of Manchester.

== Early life ==
He was educated at Urmston Grammar School. He studied at the Manchester Municipal College of Technology, which became University of Manchester Institute of Science and Technology (UMIST), graduating in 1950.

== Career ==
He had an engineering apprenticeship from 1939 to 1944 with the Manchester Ship Canal Company. He worked at the Royal Aircraft Establishment from 1944 to 1946.

=== Nuclear energy ===
He worked from 1946 to 1959 for the United Kingdom Atomic Energy Authority at Risley, Warrington (former ROF Risley), the northern headquarters of UKAEA near Birchwood (M6 side of Warrington). In 1964 he launched the Manchester-Liverpool joint research reactor, known as the Universities Research Reactor.

=== University of Manchester ===
He was the first Professor of Nuclear Engineering, from 1959 to 1986, at the University of Manchester, the heyday of Britain's nuclear energy industry. In 1976 he launched the undergraduate degree in Nuclear Engineering. Initially, whilst at UKAEA, he worked for the University of Manchester two days a week.

He was awarded the 1978 James Clayton prize, by the Institution of Mechanical Engineers.

== Personal life ==
He married Helen Dennis in 1950, and had four daughters.

Academic offices
Preceded by New position	Professor of Nuclear Engineering at the University of Manchester; 1959 - 1986	Succeeded by
