= Urmston Grammar =

Location
- Newton Road; Urmston, Manchester, M41 5UG; England; 53.4505°N 2.3608°W

Information
- Type: Grammar school; Academy
- Motto: Manners Makyth Man
- Department for Education URN: 136297 Tables
- Ofsted: Reports
- Principal: T. Kennedy-Fowler
- Staff: 65
- Gender: Mixed
- Age: 11 to 18
- Enrolment: 1,060
- Colours: Navy Blue and Gold
- Website: http://www.urmstongrammar.org.uk/

Urmston Grammar (known as Urmston Grammar School until September 2010), is a co-educational grammar school in Urmston, Greater Manchester, England. It is an academy located within the Trafford Local Authority area, though not controlled by it.

== History ==
Founded in 1929, Urmston Grammar was initially co-ed but in the early 60s a new Urmston Grammar School for Boys was built due to overcrowding at Newton Road. Later the two schools rejoined with Urmston Grammar School for Girls to become one again. Since then the school has developed various new buildings and facilities. These include the Reading Room, the Theatre and the Fitness Suite as well as a state of the art Music Room which was opened by George Fenton. Urmston Grammar was awarded specialist Science College status in 2004 and later, in 2007 it was awarded High Performing Specialist College status, and as from April 2008 Language College status as a second specialism. Urmston Grammar School converted to academy status as of September 2010, where it was 1 of the first 32 schools to convert, since then it has been known as Urmston Grammar. In the English Baccalaureate the school appeared 55th in the list of state schools in England.

== Academic performance ==
The majority of the school's pupils go on to higher education; in the 2020 academic year, 83% went on to university. Urmston Grammar's most recent Ofsted report (2022) graded the school as "good".

In GCSE, 61% of all examinations sat were awarded grade 9-7 in 2019 which increased to 68% in 2023. 2023 Urmston Grammar achieved 85% in the Baccalaureate.

In A-level the school generally achieves over 60% A*-B, which increases roughly by 1% year-on-year with 2023 Urmston Grammar students recording their highest number of A*-B grades at 68%. In 2011 the school was placed 89th in The Guardian 'Top 100 Selective Schools' and in 2012 was placed 86th in The Independent 'The Top 100 Selective Schools at A-level'.

== Notable former pupils ==
- Air Vice-Marshal Steven Chisnall CB, Station Commander of RAF Halton 1998–99
- William Bateman Hall, Professor of Nuclear Engineering at the University of Manchester 1959–1986 and pioneer of the British nuclear power industry
- Stephen Hesford, MP
- Paul Honeyford, biographer and linguist
- Keith Hopwood, guitarist with Herman's Hermits
- Judy Loe, actress, mother of Kate Beckinsale
- Ray Lowry, cartoonist, illustrator and satirist
- Sir Patrick Russell, high court judge and Lord Justice
- Matthew Kelly, TV personality and host of Stars in Their Eyes
- Paul Stenning, biographer and ghostwriter
- Tom Brady, professional rugby union player, formerly of Sale Sharks and Leicester Tigers
- Patrick Larley, composer
- George
