= Théodore Macdonald =

- Born: 25 November 1933
- Died: 2011 (aged 77–78)
- Occupation: Professor of mathematics

Théodore Harney MacDonald (25 November 1933 – 2011) was a Canadian polymath, professor of mathematics and health, and human rights defender.

== Background ==
MacDonald was raised in Montreal, Quebec, as one of six children. His father was Cuthbert Goodridge MacDonald (1897-1967), editor of The Montreal Herald and a poet. Cuthbert's mother was the writer, Elizabeth Roberts MacDonald.

Reports differ as to his early childhood. One account says that his mother left the family when he was ten and that the children were largely raised by the oldest daughter, then aged thirteen. Another says that he ran away from home, repelled by his father, but this seems unlikely because he gave praise for his father in a book preface. All agree that he was largely educated by Jesuits and that his precocious talents led to him finishing school curriculum several years early. All obituaries also report he obtained a Licentiate in Music (L.Mus) by the age of twelve. After this, he taught music before completing a second degree in mathematics and epidemiology from McGill University at the age of seventeen.

He then worked in the Canadian Wildlife Service and (possibly) served for Canada in the Korean War. One obituary says that he was captured by North Korea but defected to them at the end of the war in 1953, aged twenty, travelling by ship with East German allies and settling there to complete a medical degree. He remained a socialist for the rest of his life. He also had a C. Psychol., possibly an MA or MSc from Columbia University, and PhD, possibly two (institution and discipline unknown, possibly medicine or biology and one source suggests from Glasgow and Delaware).

In 1960, MacDonald participated in organized, nonviolent protest against racial segregation in the US southern states led by Martin Luther King Jr. and was eventually exiled from the US (he may later have studied at Columbia and Santa Clara), probably because he also began visiting Cuba and was known to authorities as a communist. MacDonald was in Perth, at the University of Western Australia, 1961-1963, and again in the 1970s, working at Monash University and the University of Newcastle, and had a Chair at the relatively young University of the South Pacific in 1972 and 1973 before being banned from entering Fiji on the grounds of 'political activity' in 1973. In all he spent over a decade in Australia, then relocated to London in the early 1980s, eventually settling in Littlehampton, on England's south coast, where he completed several books after retirement.

He was married to Elizabeth Scammell (1936-2016) between 1962 and 1980 and adopted her two daughters, Lynda and Anne, from her previous marriage and was legal parent to her son Ross, but was estranged from him from the mid-1980s. Elizabeth and Theo had two children, a daughter Sara and son Gareth (1968-1988). MacDonald was subsequently married to Chris and had one child, Matthew, with another adopted, nine grandchildren, and one great-grandson by 2011. One son, Matthew, was sentenced during the May Day riots in London in 2000, later establishing the Cambridge Anti-Capitalist Action Society while at the university and being expelled for various pro-poor actions.

== Career ==
MacDonald worked a doctor, consultant, and as an academic in several disciplines. Positions known:

- Six years in Cuba
- WHO and UNESCO officer and consultant with work in Jamaica (1969), the Solomon Islands. With WHO in Eastern Mediterranean.
- Chair in Mathematics, Monash University, Australia, 1970s and probably 1980s
- Professor of Mathematics and Education, University of the South Pacific, Fiji (197?-1973)
- University of Newcastle, Australia (c1986)
- Professor of Global Health Rights, Research Institute of Human Rights and Social Justice, London Metropolitan University, UK (?-1991)
- Professor and Director of Postgraduate Studies in Health at the West London Institute of Higher Education and at Brunel University, c. 1991-2002.
- UNESCO Chair

Positions not confirmed:

- Whether he practiced medicine. Possible MD degree either from East Germany or Mexico
- Whether he served in the Canadian army.
- Whether he practiced research in biology for a short time

== Contributions ==
Aside from developing strategies for mathematics education in the 1970s and 1980s, MacDonald argued that the major causes of ill-health in developing countries are not bacteria and viruses, or even war and natural disasters, but poverty. He asserted that addressing inequality would reduce health inequities.

Several of his later books analysed the Cuban approach to education and its remarkable system of training of medical personnel. This expanded into praise for Cuba's economic model, contrasted with Western market-led economies.

His broader normative agenda was to reform global finance and international trade, linked to the looming environmental crisis. The liberalization of trade, he argued, led to the privatizing of global health care, with negative outcomes for those living in poverty. In one of his books he argues for Health Impact Assessment to precede any multinational corporate operations.

MacDonald was a supporter of the United Nations but a critic of the World Health Organization's failure to promote health as a basic human right, particularly after 1990.

Brunel University still (2025) offers the Public Health and Health Promotion MSc that he is strongly identified with.

== Publications ==
MacDonald gave all book royalties to Cuba or other international projects. He mainly wrote by hand. In addition to dozens of books, are over 100 articles not all traceable.

- MacDonald, T.H. 2009/2016. Removing the barriers to global health equity w. Rashmin Tamnhe. Oxford: Radcliffe, then Boca Raton: CRC Press.
- MacDonald, T.H. 2009. The Education Revolution: Cuba's alternative to neoliberalism. Croydon: Manifesto Press. ISBN 1907464026
- MacDonald, T.H. 2007 or 2008. Health, human rights, and the United Nations: inconsistent aims and inherent contradictions? Oxford: Radcliffe. ISBN 1846192412
- MacDonald, T.H. 2008. Sacrificing the WHO to the Highest Bidder. Oxford: Radcliffe. ISBN 1846192528
- MacDonald, T.H. 2007/2018. The Global Human Right to Health: Dream Or Possibility?. Oxford: Radcliffe and Florida: CRC Press.
- MacDonald, T.H. 2006. Basic Concepts in Statistics and Epidemiology. London: Routledge. ISBN 1846191246
- MacDonald, T.H. 2006. Health, trade and human rights forewords by Mogobe Ramose and Desmond M. Tutu. Oxford: Radcliffe. ISBN 9781846190506
- MacDonald, T.H. 2005. Third world health: hostage to first world health. Oxford: Radcliffe.
- MacDonald, T.H. (ed.). 2003. The Social Significance of Health Promotion. London: Routledge. ISBN 0415164753
- MacDonald, T.H. 2000. Third world health promotion and its dependence on first world wealth. Lampeter: Edwin Mellen Press. ISBN 0773473874
- MacDonald, T.H. 1999.A developmental analysis of Cuba's health care system since 1959. Lampeter: Edwin Mellen Press. ISBN 0773480498
- MacDonald, T.H. 1998. Rethinking Health Promotion: A Global Approach. London: Routledge.
- MacDonald, T.H. 1998. The road to reading: A practical guide to teaching your child to read. London: Aurum. ISBN 1854105833
- MacDonald, T.H. 1996. Schooling the Revolution: an analysis of development in Cuban education since 1959. London: Praxis Press.
- MacDonald, T.H. 1995 Hippocrates in Havana: Analytical and Expository Account of the Development of the Cuban System of Healthcare from the Revolution to the Present Day. Knebworth: Bolivar Books. ISBN 0952722208
- MacDonald, T.H. 1986. Making a New People: Education in Revolutionary Cuba. Toronto: New Star Books. ISBN 0919573479
- MacDonald, T.H. 1986. Thinking mathematically. Drummoyne, N.S.W.: Shakespeare Head Press. ISBN 073020362X
- MacDonald, T.H. 1983 or 1989. First Aid in Basic Mathematics. Sydney: Hale & Iremonger. ISBN 0868060755
- MacDonald, T.H. 1984. First aid in reading, writing and spelling: a handbook for parents showing them how they can teach a child to read, write and spell. Sydney: Hale & Iremonger. ISBN 0868061166
- MacDonald, T.H. 1977. Teaching mathematics in the junior secondary school: challenge and strategy. Melbourne: Australia International Press & Publications.
- MacDonald, T.H. 1975. Mathematics teaching in schools: a critique. Richmond, Vic.: Primary Education. ISBN 0909081034
- MacDonald, T.H. 1972. Basic mathematics and remedial instruction. Sydney: Angus & Robertson. ISBN 0207125732
