= 2014 World Junior Championships in Athletics – Women's 3000 metres =

The women's 3000 metres event at the 2014 World Junior Championships in Athletics was held in Eugene, Oregon, USA, at Hayward Field on 24 July.

== Medalists ==
Gold	Mary Cain; United States
Silver	Lilian Kasait Rengeruk; Kenya
Bronze	Valentina Chepkwemoi Mateiko; Kenya

== Records ==
Standing records prior to the 2014 World Junior Championships in Athletics
World Junior Record	Zola Pieterse (GBR)	8:28.83	Rome, Italy	7 September 1985
Championship Record	Zhang Linli (CHN)	8:48.86	Seoul, South Korea	20 September 1992
World Junior Leading	Senbere Teferi (ETH)	8:41.54	Doha, Qatar	9 May 2014
Broken records during the 2014 World Junior Championships in Athletics

== Results ==
=== Final ===
24 July
Start time: 20:15 Temperature: 21 °C Humidity: 53 %

Rank	Name	Nationality	Time	Notes
1st place, gold medalist(s)	Mary Cain	United States	8:58.48	PB
2nd place, silver medalist(s)	Lilian Kasait Rengeruk	Kenya	9:00.53	
3rd place, bronze medalist(s)	Valentina Chepkwemoi Mateiko	Kenya	9:00.79	PB
4	Nozomi Musembi Takamatsu	Japan	9:02.85	PB
5	Etagegn Woldu	Ethiopia	9:06.42	
6	Emine Hatun Tuna	Turkey	9:06.85	PB
7	Jessica Hull	Australia	9:08.85	PB
8	Weini Kelati	Eritrea	9:12.32	PB
9	Gabriela Stafford	Canada	9:14.97	
10	Anna Stefani	Italy	9:23.12	PB
11	Nao Yamamoto	Japan	9:24.41	
12	Maria Magdalena Ifteni	Romania	9:26.04	PB
13	Nataliia Soltan	Ukraine	9:26.58	PB
14	Darya Maslova	Kyrgyzstan	9:30.28	
15	Stephanie Jenks	United States	9:31.47	
	Sofia Ennaoui	Poland	DNF	
	Sarah Lahti	Sweden	DNS	
	Heather Petrick	Canada	DNS	

Intermediate times:
1000m: 3:03.84 Lilian Kasait Rengeruk
2000m: 6:07.39 Valentina Chepkwemoi Mateiko

== Participation ==
According to an unofficial count, 16 athletes from 13 countries participated in the event.

- Australia (1)
- Canada (1)
- Eritrea (1)
- Ethiopia (1)
- Italy (1)
- Japan (2)
- Kenya (2)
- Kyrgyzstan (1)
- Poland (1)
- Romania (1)
- Turkey (1)
- Ukraine (1)
- United States (2)
