= Elizabeth Roberts MacDonald =

Canadian writer and poet

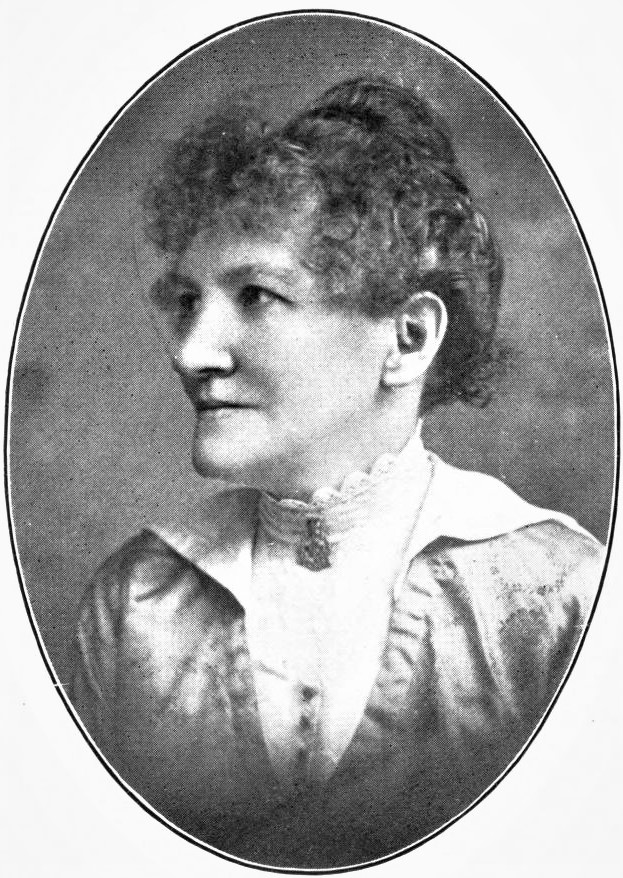
- Born: Jane Elizabeth Gostwycke Roberts; 17 February 1864; Westcock, New Brunswick, British North America
- Died: 8 November 1922 (aged 58); Ottawa, Ontario, Canada
- Education: Collegiate School, Fredericton; New Brunswick University
- Occupations: writer; suffragist
- Spouse: Samuel Archibald Roberts MacDonald (m. 1896)
- Children: 3
- Relatives: Charles G. D. Roberts, William Carman Roberts, Theodore Goodridge Roberts (brothers); Bliss Carman (cousin)
- Writing career
- Language: English
- Genres: poetry; children's literature; essays; short stories

Signature
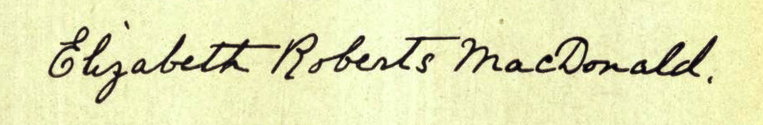

Elizabeth Roberts MacDonald (née , Roberts; 17 February 1864 – 8 November 1922) was a Canadian writer of poetry, children's literature, essays, and short stories. She regularly contributed articles to a number of Canadian and U.S. dailies. MacDonald was also one of the leaders of women's suffrage in Canada. She died in 1922.

== Early life and education ==
Jane Elizabeth Gostwycke (or, "Gostwick") Roberts was born 17 February 1864, in the "Old Rectory" at Westcock, New Brunswick. Her father was the Rev. Canon George Goodridge Roberts, Rector of Fredericton, New Brunswick, and Canon of the Cathedral there. He was a cultivated, scholarly gentleman of old English descent. Her mother was Emma Wetmore (Bliss) Roberts. Her siblings were Charles G. D. Roberts, William Carman Roberts, and Theodore Goodridge Roberts ("Thede") – a family remarkable for the variety and richness of their contribution to the literature of Canada.

On winter evenings, the favourite gathering place was about the great centre table in the sitting room, where the young people read aloud for each other's amusement or edification the rhymes or stories which the day had called forth. Spirited discussions frequently arose, but the utmost good humour prevailed and final decisions on most questions were sought and accepted from the parents. The informal gathering gave a training which no school or carefully planned course of study could have achieved. In summer weather the garden was the favourite meeting place, along with their cousin, Bliss Carman. It is of this scented garden that MacDonald wrote about in her book, Dream Verses and Others.

She was educated at the Collegiate School, Fredericton, and completed a partial course in English, French and German at the New Brunswick University.

== Career ==
MacDonald taught for a time in the Halifax School for the Blind, Halifax, Nova Scotia. Suffering from chronic ill health, she returned home.

For many years, she was a frequent contributor to magazines. Poems of hers appeared in The Century Magazine, The Independent, Outing, and other prominent magazines. "Voices", "The Spell of the Forest", "The House Among the Firs", "The Fire of the Frost", "White Magic", "The Signal Smokes", "Dreamhurst", "The Whispering Poplars", "Flood Tide", "Mountain-Ash", "March Wind", "Harvest", "Reassurance", "The Shepherd", and "A Madrigal" are some of her mentioned poems. A writer of short stories, chiefly of a romantic or idealistic nature, and an essayist of uncommon power, she perhaps did her best prose work in her book for children, Our Little Canadian Cousin, where in story-form she pictures the many-sided lives of Canadian children.

In collaboration with her two brothers, William and Theodore, she was the author of Northland Lyrics, 1899, where her contributions to its pages brought her great praise from verse lovers in England and in the U.S. Another poetry book of hers, Dream Verses and Others, was published in 1906.

In 1896, she married her cousin, Samuel Archibald Roberts MacDonald, and they removed to British Columbia. There, MacDonald took an active part in the Equal Suffrage movement and was the first president of the Women's Suffrage Society of Nelson, British Columbia. The family moved next to Winnipeg, Manitoba, where MacDonald was engaged as a special writer on the staff of the Winnipeg Telegram. In 1915, after marital separation, she moved to Ottawa, Ontario, with her sons, Archibald G. MacDonald and Cuthbert Goodridge MacDonald (a daughter, Hilary MacDonald, survived last than a year).

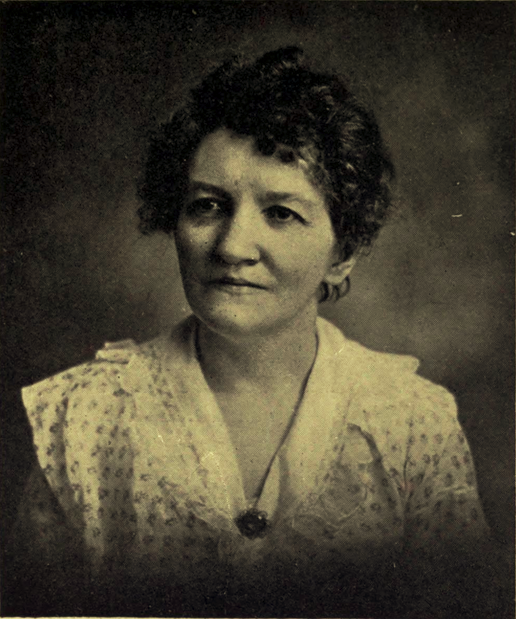

A prominent member of the Canadian Authors' Association, MacDonald also held office in many other associations with which she was connected. Among them were the Women's Press Club of Winnipeg, and later of Ottawa, the Ottawa Women's Citizen Association, the Women's Suffrage Association of Nelson, British Columbia, of which she was president, while residing there, and the Women's Suffrage Association at Winnipeg. She also held a life membership in the Women's Auxiliary of the Anglican Church. She was also at one time treasurer of the Women's Citizens' Association. In religion, she was Anglican.

== Personal life ==
Elizabeth MacDonald died at a hospital in Ottawa, 8 November 1922, from complications following an accident when she fell in her home, breaking her hip.

Like his mother, Cuthbert, went on to become a writer. Cuthbert's son, Théodore Macdonald, was a Canadian polymath, professor of mathematics and human rights defender.

== Selected works ==
- An unnamed collection of poems in booklet format was published by MacDonald's father, 1888
- Northland Lyrics, 1899 (with William Carman Roberts and Theodore Goodridge Roberts)
- Our Little Canadian Cousin, 1904
- Dream Verses and Others, 1906
