= Dave Heaven =

British musician

David Andrew Rhys Heaven (born Uplawmoor, 1959) is a Welsh-descended musician of some renown with a focus on smooth jazz and fusion. Songs such as Midnight Dean Street, Do It Again and Moonflower brought him to the attention of guitarist Pete Downes who invited him to play with PD3, a jazz group with significant and growing support. He has produced a number of albums and singles and in addition is a regular contributor to Red, a South London rock group. Heaven performs the unusual trick of playing guitar left-handed by simply inverting a right-handed guitar. This has led to a distinct tonal style which, coupled with a rare understanding of jazz harmonics, casts him as a guitarist of some significance. He has worked in collaboration with writer Paul Honeyford on a number of occasions to produce songs and jingles under the design umbrella of AR Productions. After studying at the West London Institute of Higher Education a developed interest in Giotto led him to set up his own design company which counts a number of group album covers in its portfolio.
