= Debbie Heald =

American runner

Debbie Heald (born 20 August 1955) is a former American track and field athlete, known for her success in middle-distance races.

== Early life ==
Heald is the daughter of Richard and Ernestine Heald. She grew up in La Mirada, California.

== Career ==
At the age of eleven, Heald was a member of the Hutchinson Track Club. At a meet in Lancaster, she finished a mile race with a time of 5:33.9, which at the time was the fastest time recorded for a girl of her age. By the time she was fourteen, Heald had won three state running championships and five district Amateur Athletic Union titles. She also held two national crowns.

Heald defeated the then-current 1500m world record holder Tamara Pangelova of the USSR on March 17, 1972, at the Richmond Coliseum. Her win was a significant victory as it was during the height of the Cold War and prior to this the Soviets had predominantly dominated the sport.

As well as winning, with that race Heald also set an American high school record for the indoor mile for girls track (with a time of 4:38.5), which stood for over 40 years, until finally broken on January 26, 2013, by Mary Cain. Until that time, Heald's record was the longest-standing of any girls' high school record.

Heald attended California State University, Fullerton, graduating with a degree in education. Heald continued to train throughout her college years, but her career was progressively hampered by repeated injuries and tendonitis from overtraining, as well as a diagnosis of schizophrenia.

In 2002, Heald carried the Olympic torch in Los Angeles on its nationwide tour in advance of the Winter Olympic Games at Salt Lake City.
