= Westcock, New Brunswick =

Community in New Brunswick, Canada

Coordinates: 45°52′2″N 64°22′17.2″W

Westcock in New Brunswick

Westcock is a Canadian rural community in Westmorland County, about eight kilometres southwest of Sackville. In 1866, Westcock was a farming and lumbering settlement with about 62 families, while in 1898, Westcock had 1 post office, 1 sawmill, 1 grist mill, 1 church and a population of 150.

Canadian poet and story writer Sir Charles G.D. Roberts grew up in Westcock, moving there with his family in 1861 at 1 year old and living there for the next 12 years. Roberts' sister, author Jane Elizabeth Gostwycke Roberts, was born there.

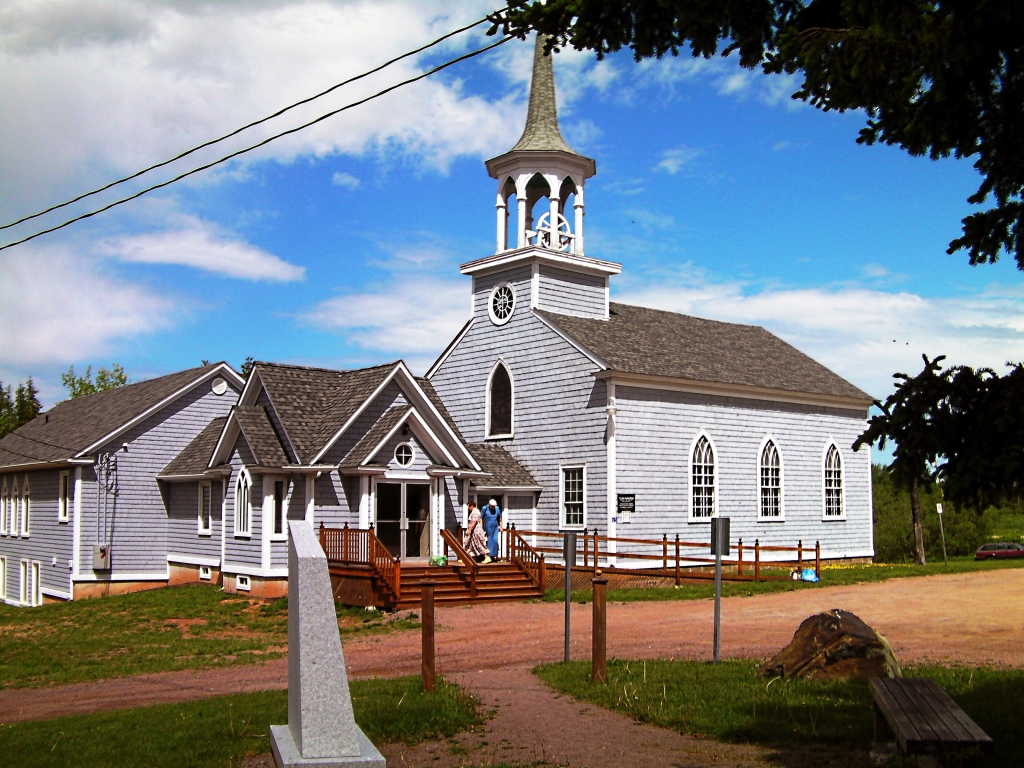
St. Ann's Anglican Church at Westcock

The Historic Sites and Monuments Board of Canada has erected a monument to Sir Charles G.D. Roberts in Westcock.

== Notable people ==
- Elizabeth Roberts MacDonald (1864–1922), writer, suffragist
- Sir Charles G.D. Roberts (1860–1943), poet, writer

== See also ==
- List of communities in New Brunswick
