= 2013 World Youth Championships in Athletics – Girls' 3000 metres =

Girls' 3000 metres at the 2013 World Youth Championships in Athletics
- Venue: RSC Olimpiyskiy
- Dates: 10 July
- Competitors: 18
- Winning time: 8:58.74 WYL

Medalists
gold medal	Lilian Kasait Rengeruk	Kenya
silver medal	Berhan Demisse	Ethiopia
bronze medal	Silenat Ysmaw	Ethiopia

The girls' 3000 metres at the 2013 World Youth Championships in Athletics was held on 10 July.

== Medalists ==
Gold	Silver	Bronze
Lilian Kasait Rengeruk; Kenya	Berhan Demisse; Ethiopia	Silenat Ysmaw; Ethiopia

== Records ==
Prior to the competition, the following records were as follows.

World Youth Best	Ma Ningning (CHN)	8:36.45	Jinan, China	6 June 1993
Championship Record	Mercy Cherono (KEN)	8:53.94	Ostrava, Czech Republic	11 July 2007
World Youth Leading	Fasika Mateferika (ETH)	9:08.45	Marseille, France	31 May 2013

== Final ==
Rank	Name	Nationality	Time	Notes
1st place, gold medalist(s)	Lilian Kasait Rengeruk	Kenya	8:58.74	WYL
2nd place, silver medalist(s)	Berhan Demiesa	Ethiopia	9:00.06	PB
3rd place, bronze medalist(s)	Silenat Yismaw	Ethiopia	9:01.63	PB
4	Stella Chesang	Uganda	9:11.03	PB
5	Alina Reh	Germany	9:20.99	PB
6	Misaki Hayashida	Japan	9:24.24	
7	Yuri Nozoe	Japan	9:24.60	
8	Mercy Chebwogen	Kenya	9:27.98	
9	Anna Gehring	Germany	9:38.34	
10	Xu Shuangshuang	China	9:44.83	PB
11	Zheng Zhiling	China	9:48.56	PB
12	Maryna Nemchenko	Ukraine	9:49.15	PB
13	Charlotte Prouse	Canada	9:49.69	PB
14	Kara MacDermid	New Zealand	9:56.36	
15	Audrey Gregan	New Zealand	9:56.60	
	Weini Frezghi	Eritrea	DNS	
	Bronwen Owen	Great Britain	DNS	
	Nicole Reina	Italy	DNS	
