= List of battalions of the Border Regiment =

This is a list of battalions of the Border Regiment, which existed as an infantry regiment of the British Army from 1881 to 1959.

== Original composition ==
When the 34th (Cumberland) Regiment of Foot was amalgamated with the 55th (Westmorland) Regiment of Foot, to become The Border Regiment in 1881 under the Cardwell-Childers reforms of the British Armed Forces, four pre-existent militia and volunteer battalions of Cumberland and Westmorland were integrated into the structure of the regiment. Volunteer battalions had been created in reaction to a perceived threat of invasion by France in the late 1850s. Organised as "rifle volunteer corps", they were independent of the British Army and composed primarily of the middle class. The only change to the regiment's structure during the period of 1881–1908 occurred in 1900, when a new volunteer battalion was raised, namely the 3rd (Cumberland) Volunteer Battalion.

Battalion	Formed	Formerly
Regular
1st	1702	1st Battalion, 34th Regiment of Foot
2nd	1755	1st Battalion, 55th Regiment of Foot
Militia
3rd (Militia)	1760	Royal Cumberland Regiment of Militia
4th (Militia)	1759	Royal Westmoreland Regiment of Militia
Volunteers
1st (Cumberland) Volunteer	1859	1st Cumberland Rifle Volunteer Corps
2nd (Westmorland) Volunteer	1859	1st Westmorland Rifle Volunteer Corps

== Reorganisation ==
The Territorial Force (later Territorial Army) was formed in 1908, which the volunteer battalions joined, while the militia battalions were transferred to the "Special Reserve". All volunteer battalions were renumbered to create a single sequential order. Alongside this, the 4th (Militia) Battalion was also disbanded in 1908.

Battalion	Formerly
4th (Cumberland and Westmorland)	Amalgamation of the 1st (Cumberland) and 2nd (Westmorland) Volunteer Battalions
5th (Cumberland)	3rd (Cumberland) Volunteer Battalion

== First World War ==
The Border Regiment fielded 18 battalions and lost almost 7,000 officers and other ranks during the course of the war. The regiment's territorial components formed second and third line battalions. As an example, the three-line battalions of the 4th Borderers were numbered as the 1/4th, 2/4th, and 3/4th respectively. Many battalions of the regiment were formed as part of Secretary of State for War Lord Kitchener's appeal for an initial 100,000 men volunteers in 1914. They were referred to as the New Army or Kitchener's Army. The 11th and 12th Borderers, New Army "Service" battalions, were referred to as "Pals" Battalions because they were predominantly composed of colleagues. The Volunteer Training Corps were raised with overage or reserved occupation men early in the war, and were initially self-organised into many small corps, with a wide variety of names. Recognition of the corps by the authorities brought regulation and as the war continued the small corps were formed into battalion sized units of the county Volunteer Regiment. In 1918, these were linked to county regiments.

Battalion	Formed	Served	Fate
Regular
1st	1702	Gallipoli, Western Front	
2nd	1755	Western Front, Italy	
Special Reserve
3rd (Reserve)	1798	Britain	
Territorial Force
1/4th (Cumberland and Westmorland)	1908	India	
1/5th (Cumberland)	1900	Western Front	
2/4th (Cumberland and Westmorland)	Kendal, October 1914	India	Disbanded in 1920
2/5th (Cumberland)	Kendal, October 1914	Britain	Absorbed into the 2/4th Battalion, Royal Scots Fusiliers
3/4th (Cumberland and Westmorland), 4th (Reserve) (Cumberland and Westmorland) from 8 April 1916	March 1915	Britain	Disbanded in 1919
3/5th (Cumberland), 5th (Reserve) (Cumberland) from 8 April 1916	March 1915	Britain	Absorbed into the 4th (Reserve) (Cumberland and Westmorland) on 1 September 1916
New Army
6th (Service)	Carlisle, August 1914	Gallipoli, Suez Canal, Western Front	Disbanded on 9 February 1918
7th (Service), 7th (Westmorland and Cumberland Yeomanry) from 22 September 1917	Carlisle, 7 September 1914	Western Front	Disbanded in 1919
8th (Service)	Carlisle, September 1914	Western Front	Disbanded on 7 July 1918
9th (Service)	Carlisle, September 1914	Salonika	Disbanded in 1919
10th (Reserve)	Southend, October 1914	Britain	Absorbed into the Training Reserve Battalion of the 4th Reserve Brigade
11th (Lonsdale) (Service)	Carlisle, 17 September 1914	Western Front	Absorbed into the 1/5th (Cumberland) Battalion on 31 July 1918
12th (Reserve)	Prees Heath, 1915	Britain	Absorbed into the 75th Training Reserve Battalion
Others
13th	Lowestoft, 1 June 1918	Britain	Absorbed into 11th Battalion, Hampshire Regiment on 18 June 1918
Volunteer Training Corps
1/1st Battalion Cumberland Volunteer Regiment later 1/1st Battalion Cumberland and Westmoreland Volunteer Regiment later the 1st Volunteer Battalion, Border Regiment		Carlisle	Disbanded post war
2/1st Battalion Cumberland Volunteer Regiment		Workington	Amalgamated with the 1st Battalion Westmoreland Volunteer Regiment February - August 1918
1st Battalion Westmoreland Volunteer Regiment later the 2nd (Cumberland and Westmoreland) Volunteer Battalion, Border Regiment		Kendal, Workington	Amalgamated with the 2/1st Battalion Cumberland Volunteer Regiment February - August 1918, Disbanded post war

== Inter-War ==
By 1920, all of the regiment's war-raised battalions had been disbanded. The Special Reserve reverted to its militia designation in 1921, then to the Supplementary Reserve in 1924; however, its battalions were effectively placed in 'suspended animation'. As World War II approached, the Territorial Army was reorganised in the mid-1930s, many of its infantry battalions were converted to other roles, especially anti-aircraft.

== Second World War ==
The Border Regiment's expansion during the Second World War was modest compared to 1914–1918. National Defence Companies were combined to create a new "Home Defence" battalion. In addition, 12 battalions of the Home Guard were affiliated to the regiment, wearing its cap badge. A number of Light Anti-Aircraft (LAA) troops were formed from the local battalions to defend specific points, such as factories. Due to the daytime (or shift working) occupations of the men in the LAA troops, the troops required eight times the manpower of an equivalent regular unit.

Battalion	Formed	Served	Fate
Regular
1st	1702	France, Sicily, Italy, Western Front	See Post-World War II
2nd	1755	Burma	See Post-World War II
Supplementary Reserve
3rd	1798		See Post-World War II
Territorial Army
4th (Cumberland and Westmorland)	1908	France, North Africa, Burma (Chindits)	See Post-World War II
5th (Cumberland)	1900	France, Britain	Disbanded in 1947
6th (East Cumberland)	April 1939	France	Soldiers drafted to one of the nine battalions making up the 15th (Scottish) Infantry Division, formally disbanded in 1947
7th (Cumberland)	April 1939		Disbanded in 1947
8th (Home Defence)	1939	Britain	Disbanded 1942
9th	October 1940, redesignation of the 50th (Holding) Battalion	Britain, Burma, India	Amalgamated with the 4th (Cumberland and Westmorland) Battalion, taking on the name of the latter on 1 December 1945
30th	1941		Disbanded? 1942
Others
50th (Holding)	June 1940	Britain	Redesignated as the 9th Battalion in October 1940
70th (Young Soldier)	1940	Britain	Disbanded 1943

Home Guard
Battalion	Headquarters	Formation Sign (dark blue on khaki)	Battalion	Headquarters	Formation Sign (dark blue on khaki)
Cumberland
1st	Longtown	CUM 1	2nd	Carlisle City	CUM 2
3rd	Carlisle	CUM 3	4th	Cockermouth	CUM 4
5th	Workington	CUM 5	6th	Whitehaven	CUM 6
7th	Millom	CUM 7	8th	Penrith	CUM 8
12th	Warwick Bridge	CUM 12			
Westmoreland
9th "Lakes"	Keswick	WES 9	10th	Appleby	WES 10
11th	Kendal	WES 11			
Home Guard Light Anti-Aircraft units
Formation Sign (dark blue on khaki)	Headquarters or Location	AA Formation and Designation	Formation Sign (dark blue on khaki)	Headquarters or Location	AA Formation and Designation
CUM 5	Workington; Workington Iron and Steel Co. Ltd	A and B Troops LAA	CUM 5	Distington; High Duty Alloys Ltd	C Troop LAA
CUM 7	Drigg; Royal Ordnance Factory	A and B Troops LAA			

== Post-World War II ==
In the immediate post-war period, the army was significantly reduced: nearly all infantry regiments had their first and second battalions amalgamated and the Supplementary Reserve disbanded.

Battalion	Fate
1st	Amalgamated with 2nd Battalion on the 28 October 1950, without a change in title
2nd	Amalgamated with 1st Battalion on the 28 October 1950

== Amalgamation ==
The 1957 Defence White Paper stated that the Border Regiment was due to amalgamated with The King's Own Royal Regiment (Lancaster), to form The King's Own Royal Border Regiment on the 1 October 1959.

Battalion	Fate
1st	Amalgamated with 1st Battalion, The King's Own Royal Regiment (Lancaster), to form 1st Battalion, The King's Own Royal Border Regiment
4th (Cumberland and Westmorland)	Transferred to the King's Own Royal Border Regiment, without a change in title
