= Greg Whyte =

British pentathlete

Greg Whyte, OBE (born 21 June 1967), also known as Super-Greg, is a former Olympian and a Sports Scientist. He won European bronze and World Championship silver medals, also competing in two Olympic Games, representing Great Britain in the Modern Pentathlon.

Whyte has been involved in Comic Relief. His role has been to train and coach celebrities who do challenges for charity, such as comedian David Walliams, John Bishop, James Cracknell, Cheryl Cole, Gary Barlow, and Eddie Izzard.

Whyte is a Professor in Applied Sport and Exercise Science at Liverpool John Moores University and a UK authority on Exercise Physiology, Sports Performance & Rehabilitation. He is Director of Performance at his clinic, The Centre for Health and Human Performance (CHHP), on Harley Street, London.

== Honours ==
Whyte was appointed Officer of the Order of the British Empire in the 2014 New Year Honours for his services to sport, sport science and charity.
