= Paul Honeyford =

English biographer and writer

Paul Honeyford (born Manchester, 1958) is an English biographer and writer who has worked on a number of music and sport related works. He has often worked with Dave Heaven, a musician, on a variety of musical and design projects.

Honeyford's biography of Paul Weller's band The Jam (The Modern World By Numbers) was the first such biography, written in consultation with the band at a time when they were at the peak of their success. Other works include Michael Jackson: The Golden Touch and Harrison Ford: A Biography.

Honeyford also contributed to a number of English magazines, including Vox and Revolver, and acted as consulting editor for a number of cult comics and magazines produced by Quality Communications.

For a time he worked with Martin Buchan, a former Manchester United footballer, on a history of Manchester United, but this was never completed.

An alumnus of Urmston Grammar School, he is the son of Ray Honeyford, who became well known in the 1980s over what became known as the Honeyford Affair.
