= Alberto Salazar =

Cuban-born American long-distance runner, and later, track coach

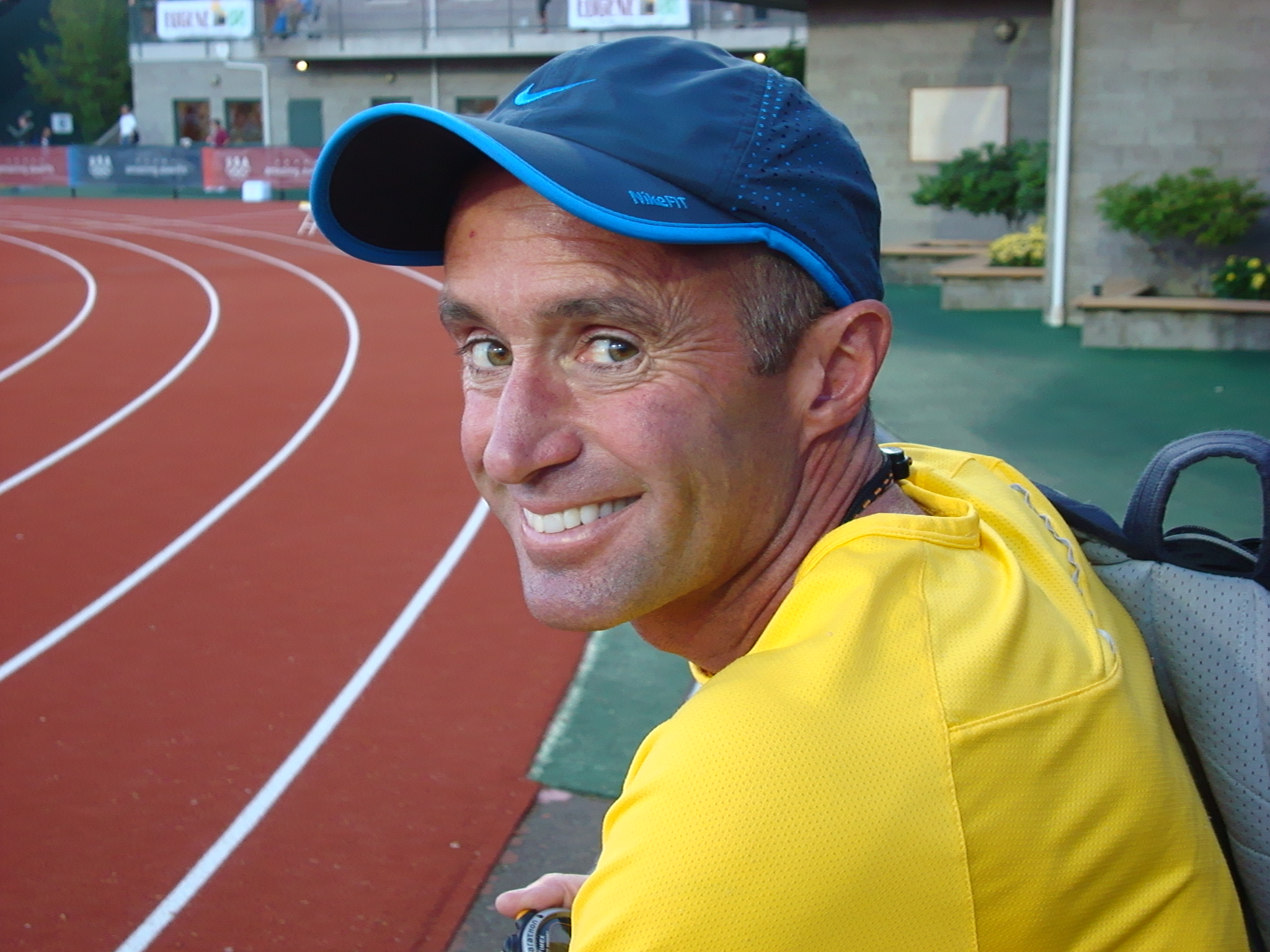
- Salazar in 2008

Personal information
- Full name: Alberto Sequisha Salazar
- Born: August 7, 1958 (age 68) Havana, Cuba
- Height: 5 ft 10 in (178 cm)
- Weight: 141 lb (64 kg)

Sport
- Country: United States
- Sport: Track, Long-distance running
- Events: 5000 meters, 10,000 meters, Marathon
- College team: Oregon

Achievements and titles
- Personal bests: 5000 meters: 13:11.26; 10,000 meters: 27:25.61; Marathon: 2:08:52
Medal record
Men's athletics
Representing United States
World Cross Country Championships
Silver medal – second place	1982 Rome	Senior race
New York City Marathon
Gold medal – first place	1982 New York	Marathon
Gold medal – first place	1981 New York	Marathon
Gold medal – first place	1980 New York	Marathon
Boston Marathon
Gold medal – first place	1982 Boston	Marathon

Alberto Salazar (born August 7, 1958) is an American former track coach and long-distance runner. Born in Cuba, Salazar immigrated to the United States as a child with his family, living in Connecticut and then in Wayland, Massachusetts, where Salazar competed in track and field in high school. Salazar won the New York City Marathon three times in the early 1980s, and won the 1982 Boston Marathon in a race known as the "Duel in the Sun". He set American track records for 5,000 m and 10,000 m in 1982. Salazar was later the head coach of the Nike Oregon Project until it was shut down in 2019 for doping violations. He won the IAAF Coaching Achievement Award in 2013.

In 2015, Salazar was named in a joint BBC Panorama and ProPublica investigation into doping allegations. In 2019, Salazar was banned for four years from athletics for doping offenses involving athletes he coached. The Nike Oregon Project was shut down in the wake of the controversy.

In January 2020, the United States Center for SafeSport placed Salazar on its temporarily banned list while it investigated allegations against him involving sexual and emotional misconduct. SafeSport permanently banned him a year and a half later, in July 2021, after it found that he had committed four violations involving emotional and sexual misconduct. In December 2021, Salazar appealed the ban in arbitration but lost, making him permanently ineligible for any activity held by the USOPC or any sport's USOPC-recognized National Governing Body.

== Early life and running career ==
=== High school ===
Born in Cuba, Salazar grew up in Wayland, Massachusetts. His father Jose was a close friend of Fidel Castro and a revolutionary, who then became an opponent of the totalitarian communist regime and member of the anti-Castro movement. The younger Salazar was an outstanding high school runner who was state cross country champion in 1975. He trained with the well-known Greater Boston Track Club (whose members included the likes of Bill Rodgers, Randy Thomas, and Greg Meyer), where he was given the nickname of "the rookie".

=== Collegiate ===
From Massachusetts, he went to the University of Oregon where he won numerous All-American honors, was a member of the 1977 NCAA cross country championship team, and won the individual NCAA cross country championship in 1978. Salazar won the 1978 NCAA national cross country championship in cold, snowy conditions, handing Track & Field News Athlete of the Year Henry Rono one of his few losses of the year. He finished 2nd to Rono in a memorable contest at the 1979 NCAA national cross country championships at Lehigh University, in which Rono (28:19) and Salazar (28:28) ran the 3rd and 5th fastest 10,000-meter cross country times in NCAA championship history. Neither time has been matched in over three decades of NCAA cross country competition since then. After that, he finished third in the Olympic Trials 10,000-meter race in 28:10.42 to make the 1980 Olympic team (which didn't compete in the Olympics in Moscow due to the U.S. boycott) and received one of 461 Congressional Gold Medals created especially for the spurned athletes.

At the 1978 Falmouth Road Race after fading to 10th place, he collapsed at the finish with a temperature of 107 degrees Fahrenheit (41.7 °C) and was read his last rites prematurely.

At the 1981 Millrose Games in New York, he set an American indoor 5,000 meter record with a time of 13:21.2, finishing second behind Suleiman Nyambui, who broke the indoor world record with a 13:20.3.

=== Post-collegiate ===
From 1980 through 1982, Salazar won three consecutive New York City Marathons. His first-ever marathon was the 1980 race, which he won in 2:09:41, at the time the fastest American debut and the second-fastest time recorded by a U.S. runner (behind Bill Rodgers' 2:09:27 at Boston in 1979). He was on that week's cover of Sports Illustrated after the victory. In 1981, Salazar set an apparent world record at the New York City Marathon of 2:08:13, surpassing the 12-year-old mark of 2:08:33 set by Australian Derek Clayton in 1969 in Antwerp, Belgium. However, the course was found on re-measurement to be about 148 meters short of the 42.195 kilometers (26 miles, 385 yards) distance. This is equivalent to about 27 seconds.

In 1982 he won his first and only Boston Marathon after the memorable head-to-head with Dick Beardsley. Salazar won the race in an exciting sprint finish and collapsed at the end before being taken to an emergency room and given six liters of saline solution intravenously because he did not drink fluids during the race. Salazar ended the year ranked #1 in the world in the marathon by Track & Field News magazine for his wins in Boston and New York, #1 in their North American Road Rankings for his American 10K road record win of 28:04 at the Orange Bowl 10K and his course record of 31:53 at the highly competitive Falmouth 7.1-mile (11.4 km) road race (his second win and course record there), #8 in the world (and #1 American with an AR of 13:11.93) in the 5,000 meters, and #2 in the world in the 10,000 meters, with three second-place finishes at Eugene (27:30.0), at Oslo in an American Record of 27:25.61, and at Paris (27:29.06).

Salazar enjoyed success in cross country competition, earning several All-American honors in collegiate and post-collegiate national championships. Salazar was also the U.S. national cross country champion in 1979. He fared well at the IAAF World Cross Country Championships, finishing second in 1982 and fourth in 1983. His silver medal in 1982 marks the last time an American male runner reached the podium in World Cross Country.

In addition to a fourth-place finish (only one second behind the top three placers) at the 1983 world cross country championships, Salazar twice broke the American 10 km road record in 1983 with efforts of 28:02 and 28:01 at the Americas 10 km and Continental Homes 10 km respectively. He finished as the top ranker in Track & Field News magazine's North American Road Rankings for 1983. He was also the 10,000-meter national track champion in 1983, pulling away from Craig Virgin in the last straightaway at the U.S. championships in Indiana in June to win his second such title (the first coming in 1981). However, he finished last in the 10,000 meters at the World Track & Field Championships while suffering from bronchitis and was beaten for the first time in the marathon, finishing fifth at the Rotterdam marathon in April (2:10:08) and then fifth again at Fukuoka in December (2:09:21). (The latter time would have been the American Record for the next 17 years except that there was a problem in filing the paperwork with the authorities.)

In 1984, after a 2nd-place finish by Salazar in the 10,000 meters at the Mt. SAC Relays in 27:45.5, he finished 2nd at the men's Olympic marathon trials (2:11:44) to become a member of the United States Olympic Marathon Team, along with Pete Pfitzinger and John Tuttle. He was considered a favorite to win or medal in the 1984 Summer Olympics but finished a disappointing 15th in 2:14:19 under the hot Los Angeles sun.

Salazar's competitive decline is often attributed to the stress on his body from that memorable Duel in the Sun detailed in the eponymous book by John Brant. Salazar recounts falling into a "more-is-better" mindset which led him to reason that if 120 miles per week yielded a certain level of success, then 180 miles (290 km) or even 200 miles (320 km) would bring even better results. This intense and grueling regimen of such extremely long distances led to a breakdown of his immune system, and he found himself frequently sick, injured, and otherwise unable to continue training.

After failing to make the 1988 Olympic Marathon Team Salazar opened a successful restaurant in Eugene, Oregon. Although only able to stagger through four or five miles per run, he remained obsessed with training. Brant wrote that "He couldn't run, yet he couldn't stop running." Salazar unsuccessfully visited the Stanford Sleep Clinic and a cardiologist, had surgery, and trained in Kenya. In 1994 he said that "For most of the last 10 years, I hated running. I hated it with a passion. I used to wish for a cataclysmic injury in which I would lose one of my legs. I know that sounds terrible, but if I had lost a leg, then I wouldn't have to torture myself anymore."

A doctor diagnosed Salazar's running problems and exercise-induced asthma as largely due to the 1982 marathon, and successfully prescribed Prozac to improve his depression and physical symptoms. After Salazar closed the restaurant he owned, he began training again at the age of 34 and in 1994 won the prestigious 90 km (56 mi) Comrades Marathon. He soon retired from competing, believing that he had nothing left to prove as a runner, and became a running coach. Salazar stated that the medication played a role in motivating him to succeed again in professional running though the actual effect of the drug on his performance remains controversial.

== Post-competitive career ==
After his competition career, Salazar moved into coaching. By 1996, this included middle-distance runner Mary Decker, who at the age of 37 qualified for the 5000 meters at the Atlanta Olympics. However, a urine test taken in June at the Olympic Trials showed a testosterone to epitestosterone (T/E) ratio greater than the allowable maximum of six to one. While Decker and her lawyers contended that the T/E ratio test is unreliable for women in their late 30s who are taking birth control pills, she was eliminated in the heats at the Olympics. In June 1997, the IAAF banned Decker from competition. Later reinstated by a USATF panel, the IAAF cleared her to compete but took the case to arbitration. In April 1999, the arbitration panel ruled against her, after which the IAAF through a retroactive ban stripped her of a silver medal she had won in the 1500 meters at the 1997 World Indoor Championships.

Salazar was employed by Nike as coach of the Nike Oregon Project. Aimed at producing Olympic-caliber athletes, project members who have trained under Salazar's tutelage include Alan Webb, Mo Farah, Galen Rupp, Adam Goucher, Kara Goucher, Dan Browne, Amy Yoder Begley, Sifan Hassan and Dathan Ritzenhein. His connection to Oregon and Oregon Sports gave him the distinction of being inducted into the Oregon Sports Hall of Fame in 1997. In August 2012 at the London Summer Olympics, two of Salazar's Olympic-caliber athletes, Mo Farah and Galen Rupp, finished 1st and 2nd respectively in the 10,000 m; Farah also went on to win gold in the 5,000 m, becoming the first British double Olympian in long distance.

Salazar ran in the ING New York Marathon in 2006, at age 48, serving as a pacesetter for cyclist Lance Armstrong, who was attempting his first marathon. Salazar was primarily responsible for guiding Armstrong for the first 10 miles (16 km) of the race, while Joan Benoit Samuelson oversaw the next 10 miles (16 km), and Hicham El Guerrouj the final 6.2 miles (10.0 km). With their help, Armstrong met his goal of completing the race under three hours, finishing in 2:59:36.

On Saturday, June 30, 2007, Salazar suffered a heart attack and was rushed to the hospital. On Sunday, July 1 he was reported to be "groggy" by his family and remained listed in serious condition. On July 2, doctors upgraded his condition from "serious" to "fair". He was released from the hospital on July 8.

On June 26, 2008, on the eve of the US Olympic trials, Salazar was taken to the hospital again, for dehydration and high blood pressure. He attributes this partially to the stress of coaching five Olympic-hopeful athletes. Afterwards, doctors adjusted his medications, but do not believe that there was any further injury to the heart. He returned to the track to coach his athletes through the trials.

In 2012, Salazar published the autobiography 14 Minutes: A Running Legend's Life and Death and Life, along with John Brant. The book tracks Salazar's story from his family's roots in Cuba, his adolescence in Massachusetts, through his running career to present-day coaching efforts, culminating in his 14-minute-long heart stop in 2007.

=== Doping investigations ===
In June 2015, Salazar was named in a joint BBC Panorama and ProPublica investigation into doping allegations. This involved testimonies from various athletes and people associated with Salazar about alleged microdosing of testosterone and prednisone at the Nike Oregon Project. Salazar declined to be interviewed for the programme, but denied any wrongdoing, saying in a statement that the "allegations your sources are making are based upon false assumptions and half-truths in an attempt to further their personal agendas". One of the more high-profile allegations was made by former Nike Oregon Project athlete Kara Goucher, who claimed she was pressured by Salazar to take thyroid medication not prescribed by her doctor to lose weight gained during her pregnancy in 2010. The accusations were addressed by Salazar in public releases.

On October 1, 2019, United States Anti-Doping Agency USADA banned Salazar and Dr. Jeffrey Stuart Brown, a colleague at the Nike Oregon Project, for doping offences. These included using a WADA prohibited method, tampering with doping control methods and trafficking testosterone through a prohibited testing program. In response, Salazar stated that "Throughout this six-year investigation my athletes and I have endured unjust, unethical and highly damaging treatment from USADA. [...] I have always ensured the World Anti-Doping Agency code is strictly followed." Records of the investigations were unsealed two days later, exposing a pattern of withholding their own medical records from the athletes, ignoring subpoenas, and other forms of delay.

Salazar appealed his doping ban to the international Court of Arbitration for Sport (CAS), which upheld his 4-year ban on September 16, 2021. The CAS stated that he was found guilty of "possessing testosterone, complicity in Brown's administration of a prohibited method, and tampering with the doping control process." The CAS did reject USADA's request to increase the ban beyond 4 years, stating that "None of the ADRVs (anti-doping rule violations) directly affected athletic competition, and... there was no evidence put before the CAS as to any effect on athletes competing at the elite level."

Salazar's doping ban ended on October 1, 2023.

== SafeSport bans ==
In January 2020, the United States Center for SafeSport sanctioned Salazar with an additional (temporary) ban from coaching, after SafeSport investigated allegations against him of sexual and emotional misconduct. Although SafeSport did not make public the offense or offenses for which it banned him, Mary Cain, Kara Goucher, Adam Goucher, and Amy Yoder Begley were among those who had previously made public complaints about Salazar's conduct, especially pertaining to unsafe weight restrictions.

On July 26, 2021, Salazar was deemed "permanently ineligible" by SafeSport, after it found that he had committed four violations of emotional and sexual misconduct, including two instances of his penetrating a runner with his finger while giving an athletic massage. Salazar appealed via an arbitration that was held in early December 2021. At the arbitration hearing Salazar denied the accusations against him, and said he did not speak with or see the runner on the days in question. The appeal was unsuccessful as an arbitrator did not find Salazar’s explanation credible, and accepted his accuser’s version of events, determining that he more likely than not had sexually assaulted the athlete on two different occasions and had also made sexually inappropriate comments toward the runner. As a result Salazar was effectively banned for life from participating in any activity put on by or under the auspices of the United States Olympic & Paralympic Committee or any sport's USOPC-recognized National Governing Body. His name was removed from the building on Nike’s Beaverton campus after the ban was imposed. Salazar continued to deny involvement in any misconduct and said that he felt the SafeSport process was unfair and "lacked due process protections". In 2023, Kara Goucher came forward as the athlete who accused Salazar of sexual abuse.

Because Salazar's ban only applies to national governing bodies recognized by USOPC, he has been permitted to coach athletes affiliated with other national governing bodies (those outside the US) since his doping ban ended on October 1, 2023.

In November 2023, Salazar and Nike reportedly settled a $20 million lawsuit from Mary Cain, in which she had alleged emotional and physical abuse by Salazar and that Nike did not take the proper measures to protect her.

== Competition record ==
=== Ultra Marathon ===
Year	Competition	Venue	Position	Time
1994	Comrades Marathon	South Africa	1st	5:38:39

=== Marathon ===
Year	Competition	Venue	Position	Time
Representing the United States
1980	New York City Marathon	New York City, United States	1st	2:09:41
1981	New York City Marathon	New York, United States	1st	2:08:13
1982	New York City Marathon	New York, United States	1st	2:09:29
1982	Boston Marathon	Boston, United States	1st	2:08:52
1983	Rotterdam Marathon	Rotterdam, Netherlands	5th	2:10:08
1983	Fukuoka Marathon	Fukuoka, Japan	5th	2:09:21
1984	US Olympic Trials	Buffalo, United States	2nd	2:11:44
1984	Olympic Games	Los Angeles, California	15th	2:14:19

=== Track and Field ===
Year	Competition	Venue	Position	Event	Time
Representing the United States
1980	US Olympic Trials	Eugene, Oregon	3rd	10,000 m	28:10.42
1981	USA Outdoor Track and Field Championships	Sacramento, California	1st	10,000 m	28:39.33
1983	USA Outdoor Track and Field Championships	Indianapolis, Indiana	1st	10,000 m	28:11.64

=== Cross country ===
Year	Competition	Venue	Position	Time
Representing the United States
1979	USA Cross Country Championships	—	1st	—
1982	USA Cross Country Trials	Pocatello, Idaho	1st	36:52.4
1982	World Cross Country Championships	Rome, Italy	2nd	33:44.8
1983	USA Cross Country Trials	Edwardsville, Illinois	1st	36:34
1983	World Cross Country Championships	Gateshead, England	4th	36:53

=== NCAA cross country ===
Year	Competition	Venue	Position	Time
Representing Oregon
1977	NCAA Cross Country Championships	Pullman, Washington	9th	29:20.8
1978	NCAA Cross Country Championships	Madison, Wisconsin	1st	29:29.7
1979	NCAA Cross Country Championships	Bethlehem, Pennsylvania	2nd	28:37.4

== Awards ==
- World Athletics Awards - Coaching Achievement Award：2013

== See also ==
- List of Cuban Americans
- List of winners of the Boston Marathon
- List of winners of the New York City Marathon
- List of winners of the NCAA Men's Cross Country Championship
- Angelo Taylor
