= Kara Goucher =

American long-distance runner

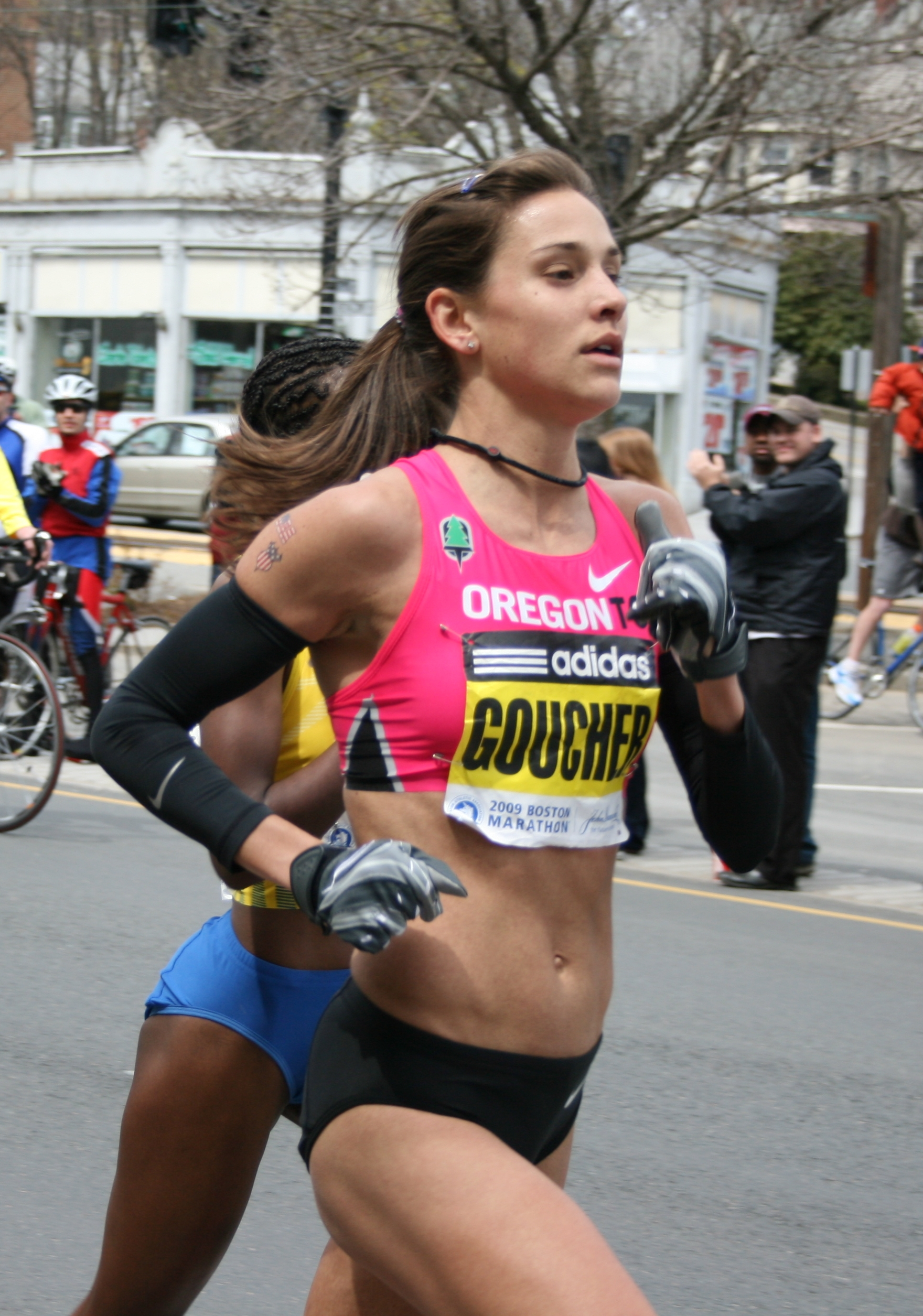
- Goucher at the 2009 Boston Marathon

Personal information
- Born: Kara Grgas; July 9, 1978 (age 48) Queens, New York, U.S.
- Height: 5 ft 8 in (1.73 m)
- Spouse: Adam Goucher
- Children: 1
- Website: www.karagoucher.com

Sport
- Country: United States
- Events: 5000 meters, 10,000 meters, marathon
- College team: Colorado Buffaloes
- Coached by: Alberto Salazar (2004–2011); Jerry Schumacher (2011–2013); Mark Wetmore and Heather Burroughs (2014 - present)

Achievements and titles
- Olympic finals: 2008; 10,000 m, 8th 5000 m, 8th 2012; Marathon, 10th
- World finals: 2007; 10,000 m, Silver; 2009; Marathon, 10th 2011; 10,000 m, 13th
- Personal bests: Outdoor; 800 m: 2:06.79 (Beaverton 2009); 1500 m: 4:05.14 (Rieti 2006); 3000 m: 8:34.99 (Rieti 2007); 5000 m: 14:55.02 (Berlin 2007); 10,000 m: 30:55.16 (Beijing 2008); Road; Half marathon: 1:06:57a AR (South Shields 2007); Marathon: 2:24:52a (Boston 2011)
Medal record
Women's athletics
Representing the United States
World Championships
Silver medal – second place	2007 Osaka	10,000 m
World Cup
Bronze medal – third place	2006 Athens	3000 m
World Marathon Majors
Bronze medal – third place	2009 Boston	Marathon
Bronze medal – third place	2008 New York	Marathon

Kara Goucher (née Grgas, later Grgas-Wheeler; born July 9, 1978) is an American long-distance runner, author, television commentator, and podcaster. She was the 10,000 meters silver medalist at the 2007 World Championships in Athletics and represented the US at the 2008 Beijing Olympics and 2012 London Olympics. She made her marathon debut in 2008, finishing third at the New York City Marathon, and finished third the following year at the Boston Marathon.

She competed collegiately for the University of Colorado and was a three-time NCAA champion (twice in track and once in cross country).

== Personal life ==
Goucher was born Kara Grgas in Queens, New York. When she was four years old, her family moved to Duluth, Minnesota, after her father was killed by a drunk driver on the Harlem River Drive. When her mother remarried, Kara took her stepfather's name and was known as Kara Grgas-Wheeler. She ran in high school for Duluth East.

She married fellow runner and US Olympian Adam Goucher from Colorado in 2001, competing as Kara Goucher from that point forward. Kara gave birth to their son, Colton (Colt) Mirko Goucher, on September 25, 2010. In 2014, she moved with her family from Portland, Oregon to Boulder, Colorado. Both Kara and Adam hold individual NCAA cross country titles, from 2000 and 1998 respectively.

In 2021, Goucher was diagnosed with repetitive exercise dystonia after noticing lack of sensation in her legs and difficulty running.

== Running career ==
=== College ===
As a runner for the University of Colorado, Goucher broke out in 2000, becoming the National Collegiate Athletic Association (NCAA) Outdoor Champion in 3000 m and 5000 m, the NCAA Cross Country Champion, and also a 5000 m Olympic Trials Finalist (eighth). She won the Honda Sports Award as the best female collegiate cross country runner in the nation in 2001. She graduated from the University of Colorado in 2001.

=== Professional ===
After college, Goucher battled injuries for several years, but returned in 2006. After finishing second in the 5000 m at the USATF Outdoor Championships in 2006, she set personal bests at all distances on the international circuit, running the World "A" Standard in the 1500 m, 5000 m, and 10,000 m. She finished third in 3000 metres at the 2006 IAAF World Cup in a new personal best time of 8:41.42. Her 3000 m time led the nation, and her 10,000m time ranked her as the second fastest American woman of all time. At the 2007 IAAF World Championships in Osaka, Japan, she won the silver medal in the women's 10,000 m event.

In September 2007, she won the Great North Run in 1:06:57, the fastest woman's half marathon time of the year, setting a new American best time at the distance, and beating marathon world record-holder Paula Radcliffe, on the latter's comeback from pregnancy and injury. The half marathon was Goucher's first competitive race longer than 10k.

Goucher kicked off 2008 with a win in the prestigious Millrose Games mile with a personal record of 4:36:03. At the 2008 Prefontaine Classic track meet in Eugene, Oregon, USA, Goucher ran the 5000 m, the same race as the World Record attempt by Meseret Defar. Goucher finished third behind Defar and Kenyan Vivian Cheruiyot in her second fastest ever time of 14:58.10 minutes.

Goucher raced in the USATF Championships and Olympic Trials on June 27, 2008, in the 5000 m and the 10,000 m. The championships were held at Hayward Field, Eugene, Oregon. Goucher already had the Olympic A Standard, but achieved it again, recording 31:37.72 at 10,000 m, finishing second behind American record-holder Shalane Flanagan's 31:34.81. In the 5000 m, Goucher won her semifinal heat with a time of 15:32.32, and won the final race with a time of 15:01.02. Goucher competed in the Beijing 2008 Summer Olympics 10,000 m final where she placed tenth with a personal best time of 30:55.16, and the 5000 m where she placed ninth with a time of 15:49.39.

Goucher made her marathon debut at the New York City Marathon on November 2, 2008. She finished in third place in a time of 2:25:53, becoming the first American on the podium since Anne Marie Lauck was third in 1994. Goucher was chosen as the 2008 Road Runner of the Year in the Open Female division by the Road Runners Club of America. Don Ness, then mayor of Duluth, Minnesota, held a reception in Goucher's honor and declared 30 December 2008 to be Kara Goucher Day.

The next year, she won the 2009 Lisbon Half Marathon, and placed third in the 2009 Boston Marathon in a time of 2:32:25. She finished tenth in the marathon at the 2009 World Championships in Athletics, with a time of 2:27:48.

Goucher became pregnant in early 2010 and took a season away from competition as a result. Following the birth of her child, she returned to competition at the Arizona Half Marathon in January 2011, and finished as the runner-up behind Madaí Pérez. At the 2011 New York City Half Marathon, she placed third with a time of 1:09:03 hours.

In April 2011, Goucher returned to marathon running at the 2011 Boston Marathon, where she placed fifth with a time of 2:24:52 hours, setting a new personal best by a minute. She was runner-up to Shalane Flanagan over 10,000 m at the 2011 USA Outdoor Track and Field Championships and later ran in the event at the 2011 World Championships in Athletics, where she finished 13th overall. In December, she competed at the inaugural Miami Beach Half Marathon and was again second behind Flanagan. Goucher left Nike‘s Oregon Project in October 2011 after seven years.

Goucher qualified for the 2012 Summer Olympics by placing third at the U.S. Olympic marathon trials on January 14, 2012 in Houston, finishing with a time of 2:26:06. She came third at the New York Half Marathon that March, running a time of 1:09:12 hours. She placed 11th in the 2012 Summer Olympics with a time of 2:26.07.

Goucher returned to the 2013 Boston Marathon on April 15, placing 6th with a time of 2:28:11. The event was subject to a terrorist attack, with a pair of consecutive explosions near the finish line killing three spectators and injuring over 180 others. At the time of the explosions, Goucher was resting in her hotel room with her family, the blasts close enough to shake the windows to their room.

Goucher competed in the Philadelphia Half Marathon on September 21, 2014, finishing sixth with a time of 1:11:39. Kara placed 14th (4th among American women) in the TCS New York City Marathon on November 2, 2014 in 2:37:03.

Goucher finished 18th in the 2015 USATF Championships with a time of 16:05.35. On 13 February 2016, Goucher placed fourth at the US Olympic Marathon Trials, finishing in 2:30:24.

== Achievements ==
Year	Competition	Venue	Position	Event	Time
Representing the United States
2006	World Cup	Athens, Greece	3rd	3000 m	8:41.42
2007	World Championships	Osaka, Japan	2nd	10,000 m	32:02.05
2008	Olympic Games	Beijing, China	9th	10,000 m	30:55.16
2008	New York City Marathon	New York, New York, USA	3rd	Marathon	2:25:53
2009	Boston Marathon	Boston, Massachusetts, USA	3rd	Marathon	2:32:25
2009	World Championships	Berlin, Germany	9th	Marathon	2:27:48
2011	Boston Marathon	Boston, Massachusetts, USA	5th	Marathon	2:24:52
2011	World Championships	Daegu, South Korea	13th	10,000m	32:29.58
2012	U.S Olympic Marathon Trials	Houston, Texas	3rd	Marathon	2:26:06
2012	USA Half Marathon Championships	Duluth, Minnesota, USA	1st	Half marathon	1:09:46
2012	Olympic Games	London, United Kingdom	11th	Marathon	2:26:07
2013	Boston Marathon	Boston, Massachusetts, USA	6th	Marathon	2:28:11
2014	New York City Marathon	New York, New York, USA	14th	Marathon	2:37:03
2015	Rock ‘n’ Roll San Antonio Half Marathon	San Antonio, Texas, USA	1st	Half marathon	1:11:10
2016	U.S. Olympic Marathon Trials	Los Angeles, California, USA	4th	Marathon	2:30:24

== Personal records ==
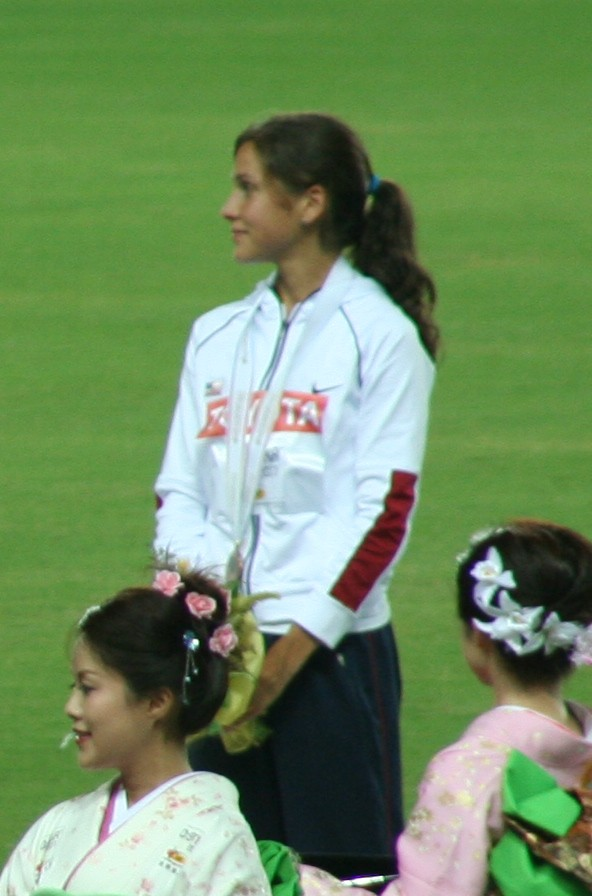
Goucher at the 2007 World Championships

Distance	Performance	Location	Date
1500 m	4:05.14	Rieti	August 27, 2006
One mile (indoor)	4:33.19	New York City	January 30, 2009
2000 m	5:41.28	Eugene, Oregon	June 7, 2009
3000 m	8:34.99	Rieti	September 9, 2007
Two Miles	9:41.32	Carson, CA	May 20, 2007
5000 m	14:55.02	Berlin	September 16, 2007
10,000 m	30:55.16	Beijing	August 15, 2008
10 miles	53:16	Minneapolis, MN	October 5, 2008
Half marathon (point to point)	1:06:57	Newcastle	September 30, 2007
Half marathon	1:08:05	Chicago, Illinois	August 2, 2009
Marathon	2:24:52	Boston, MA	April 18, 2011

== Post-running career ==
In 2014, Goucher joined the women-run running clothing company Oiselle.

Since retiring from professional competitive running, Goucher has worked as a commentator for NBC Sports, including at both the 2021 Tokyo Summer Olympics and 2024 Paris Summer Olympics.

In January 2023, Goucher began a podcast called Nobody Asked Us with fellow runner Des Linden. The two discuss a wide range of topics related to running and elite running performances. The first three episodes were released on January 11, 2023. Season 2 debuted on January 2, 2024, and Season 3 debuted on January 14, 2025.

On March 14, 2023, Goucher released her book, The Longest Race: Inside the Secret World of Abuse, Doping and Deception on Nike's Elite Running Team, co-written with Mary Pilon. It reached number 4 on the New York Times bestsellers list.
