= Nike Oregon Project =

American athlete training group

- Abbreviation: NOP
- Formation: 2001
- Dissolved: October 10, 2019; 7 years ago
- Type: Elite athlete training group
- Location: Beaverton, Oregon, United States
- Region served: United States

The Nike Oregon Project was a runners' training group created by the American corporation Nike, established in Beaverton, Oregon in 2001. The team folded on October 10, 2019 after an investigation resulted in a four-year ban of longtime coach Alberto Salazar.

== Facilities ==
The runners lived in the Portland, Oregon area and trained at Nike's headquarters campus located just outside the Portland suburb of Beaverton, Oregon. Some runners lived in a specially designed house where filters were used to remove oxygen from the air, to simulate living at high elevation. Numerous studies have shown that living at altitude causes an athlete to develop more red blood cells, increasing athletic performance.

In addition to the simulated altitude training, a program was used to monitor electrodes attached to the athletes, determining what condition they were in and how far or fast they could train. They used underwater and low-gravity treadmills, which allow athletes to run on a reduced percentage of their own body weight, resulting in less intense impact on the body than outdoor running. They also had a collaboration with Colorado Altitude Training, a company specializing in hypoxic athletic training, for their training equipment.

== Creation ==
Nike's Oregon Project was created by Nike Vice President Thomas E. Clarke after he reportedly became dissatisfied with the performance of American athletes in long-distance events since the early 1980s. During that time, Alberto Salazar (later the Oregon Project head coach) had won three consecutive New York City Marathons in 1980, 1981, and 1982.

When the project first began, Salazar chose some of the top runners of the time who he believed had great potential. Eventually, however, he concluded that since these athletes were older, their training habits had become ingrained and difficult to overcome; this led him to take on younger athletes instead. His new focus led Salazar to coach Matthew Centrowitz, Galen Rupp, and Adam and Kara Goucher. Salazar believed these athletes went on to more success because he worked with them from a younger age.

== Athletes ==
- (United States) Donavan Brazier
- (United States) Mary Cain
- (United States) Matthew Centrowitz, Jr.
- (United States) Craig Engels
- (United States) Tara Erdmann
- (United Kingdom) Mo Farah
- (United States) Adam Goucher
- (United States) Kara Goucher
- (United States) Jordan Hasay
- (Netherlands) Sifan Hassan
- (Australia) Jessica Hull
- (United States) Eric Jenkins
- (Ethiopia) Yomif Kejelcha
- (Germany) Konstanze Klosterhalfen
- (Canada) Cam Levins
- (United States) Treniere Moser
- (United States) Clayton Murphy
- (Japan) Suguru Osako
- (United States) Luke Puskedra
- (United States) Dathan Ritzenhein
- (United States) Shannon Rowbury
- (United States) Galen Rupp
- (United States) Dorian Ulrey

== Leadership ==
The health of coach and project director Alberto Salazar had been in question since he suffered a heart attack at Nike's Beaverton campus on June 30, 2007. He was implanted with a defibrillator, and he planned to take a more limited role with Nike Oregon Project. In June 2008, he chose his tentative successor as head of the Oregon Project, hiring cross country coach Jerry Schumacher away from the University of Wisconsin–Madison. In turn, Schumacher brought his top distance protégé, Matt Tegenkamp, with him to join the program along with Chris Solinsky and UW–Madison freshman turned pro Evan Jager.

=== Staff ===
- Alberto Salazar, head coach
- Pete Julian, assistant coach
- Dr. Darren Treasure, Ph.D.
- David McHenry, physical therapist

== Criticisms ==
In 2002, the Oregon Project came under scrutiny from the United States Anti-Doping Agency (USADA) after head coach Salazar's assistant coach Steve Magness advised the agency to investigate the project. The USADA formed a think tank to discuss the ethics of the high-altitude house. The agency's senior managing director, Larry Bowers, said,

"The argument for altitude rooms is that they make up for those athletes that can't live high. What they don't take into account is that people living high don't get the benefits of training low."

Alberto Salazar was confident that the Anti-Doping Agency would ultimately approve the altitude house, saying that it was no different from other legal scientific advances like heart rate monitors and sports drinks.

In 2006, the subject was revisited more thoroughly by the World Anti-Doping Agency (WADA), which claimed that the high-altitude house could be equivalent to blood doping and therefore should be banned; however, on September 16, 2006, Dick Pound of the WADA announced that "the overwhelming consensus of our health, medicine and research committees – was that, at this time, it is not appropriate to do so." No explanation was given as to how WADA could possibly have enforced such a ban.

The Oregon Project has also been criticized by college track coaches for recruiting Galen Rupp directly out of high school to go live at the high-altitude house and forgo attending University of Oregon for his first year.

On May 19, 2017, The New York Times wrote an article about a leaked and unverified USADA report that claimed Salazar worked with athletes to increase their L-carnitine levels. The main accusation involved was that the intravenous method used could potentially have violated USADA anti-doping rules if the amount infused was too high.

On October 1, 2019, the USADA banned Salazar for four years due to allegations that he had "trafficked testosterone, infused a prohibited amount of L-carnitine and tried to tamper with doping controls." Salazar planned to appeal the ban immediately, but was not able to, due to COVID pandemic restrictions. In 2021, he attempted an appeal. However, the Court of Arbitration for Sport chose to uphold the ban.

On November 7, 2019, the New York Times released a video op-ed in which former Oregon Project athlete Mary Cain alleged that she had suffered emotional and physical abuse by Salazar during her time at the project. She claimed that she was pressured to take illegal diuretics and was shamed about her weight to the point of self-harm and suicidal thoughts. In a statement, Salazar denied most of the allegations. Nike also made an official statement challenging the allegations, citing Cain's desire to rejoin the team in April 2019.

In December of 2021, Salazar was given a lifetime ban after an arbitrator deemed that he had most likely committed sexual assault twice against his athletes. This led to an investigation by the U.S. Center for SafeSport, which found that he actually had four violations, solidifying his permanent ban.

== Closure ==
On October 10, 2019, Nike announced that they would be closing down the Nike Oregon project. Nike CEO Mark Parker reported that the situation surrounding Salazar's actions were distracting for the athletes, and were compromising their ability to focus on their training and competition needs. Nike would help the current runners involved in the project find alternative training arrangements.
