= Mary Cain (athlete) =

American middle-distance runner

Personal information
- Nationality: American / Irish
- Born: Mary Cecilia Cain; May 3, 1996 (age 30) New York City, New York, U.S.
- Height: 5 ft 7 in (1.70 m)

Sport
- Country: Ireland (2024-); United States (2014-2023)
- Sport: Running
- Events: 800 meters, 1500 meters, 3000 meters
- Club: Atalanta NYC
- Coached by: John Henwood
Medal record
Women's athletics
Representing the United States
World Junior Championships
Gold medal – first place	2014 Oregon	3000 m
NACAC U-23
Silver medal – second place	2016 El Salvador	1500 m

Mary Cecilia Cain (born May 3, 1996) is an American-born Irish professional middle distance runner from Bronxville, New York. Cain was the 2014 World Junior Champion in the 3000 meter event. She is the youngest female athlete ever to represent the United States at a track and field World Championships meet after competing in the 2013 World Championships in Athletics in Moscow aged 17 years and 3 months.

== Early life and education ==
Cain was born in New York City in 1996, the daughter of Charles and Mary E. Cain, and has three sisters, Aine, Catherine, and Mairead. She grew up in Bronxville, New York, in Westchester County, north of New York City, and was noticed in the seventh grade for her running ability. Her main events are in middle distance running. She graduated from Bronxville High School in 2014. She attended the honors program at the University of Portland in Portland, Oregon while competing as a professional athlete for Nike, Inc.

== Career ==
=== Early high school career ===
Cain ran for 10 seasons for Bronxville High School, winning numerous state titles, as well as two national titles while still a Bronxville athlete. In 2010, she was the NYS Class C Cross Country Champion; in 2011, she was both NYS Class C and NYS Federation Champion. She ran the 800 meters at the 2012 United States Olympic Trials and placed 18th, and also ran at the 2012 World Junior Championships in Athletics, where she broke the American high school girl's outdoor record in the 1500 m with a 4:11.01, surpassing the record of Jordan Hasay in the 2008 United States Olympic Trials by over 3 seconds. The effort qualified her to run in the World Championships. She had taken second in the same event the year before.

=== 2013 ===
On January 16, 2013, Cain won the 3000 meter race at the University of Washington Indoor Preview meet, with what should be a record-setting time of 9:02.10 (high school), superior to the 9:08.6 Outdoor record of Lynn Bjorklund set in 1975. Historically no records set indoors at the University of Washington track have been accepted because at 307 meters, the track is oversized, although it is significantly smaller than a normal 400-meter outdoor track. At the world level since 2000, indoor marks superior to the outdoor record are now accepted. But the record for 3000 meters at the High School level is administered to by Track and Field News which sets its own standards. For the accomplishment, USATF named Cain the Athlete of the Week. On January 26, in New York City, she ran the indoor one mile in 4:32.78. The mark beat Debbie Heald's indoor national high school record from 1972 by almost 6 seconds. Even though she had not started her finishing kick yet, her 1500-meter split time of 4:16.11 surpassed Lynn Jennings' record for that distance from 1978. Her time was also more than two and a half seconds superior to Polly Plumer's outdoor national high school outdoor record from 1982. On February 2, 2013, at the Boston Indoor Games, Cain set the high school record in the indoor 2 mile with a time of 9:38.68. Her time was almost 10 seconds superior to Kim Mortensen's outdoor record for the slightly shorter 3200 meters. Shortly after, at the Millrose Games, Cain ran the mile in 4:28.25. Her time improved upon her own records in the mile and her split time at 1500 also improved upon her records. Her mile time was also more than two seconds faster than Gelete Burka's world youth best. Since 2000, the IAAF recognizes indoor records that are superior to outdoor records, however the IAAF does not track the mile distance at the youth level. On May 17, 2013, at the Oxy Distance Classic, Cain ran the 1500 meters in 4:04.62, shattering her own high school record from the previous year and breaking Suzy Favor's American junior record (who was almost two years older when she set the record in 1987). In her first IAAF Diamond League event in June 2013, Cain set an American junior and high school record in the 800 metres with a time of 1:59.51, surpassing Kim Gallagher's records set in 1982. With her time, she became the first American youth, junior or high school female to break the 2 minute barrier. Cain ran 5,000 meters 15:45.46 in Portland, Oregon at Portland Track Festival on June 8, 2013, to set a United States high school national records in track and field. At the 2013 USA Outdoor Track and Field Championships, Cain entered the 1500 and 5000 meters in order to qualify for the 2013 World Championships in Athletics in Moscow, but later dropped the 5000 from her schedule. In a slow and tactical 1500, Cain led most of the final lap until the last 10 meters when she was passed by training partner Treniere Moser and finished in second place with a time of 4:28.76, thus qualifying for her first senior team as a 17-year-old and becoming the youngest American to ever make a World Championships team. At the 2013 World Championships, Cain qualified for the 1500 meters final by placing 13th in the heats with a time of 4:08.21, and 5th in the semifinals with a time of 4:05.21. In qualifying for the final, she became the youngest athlete ever to run in a 1500 meters final in World Championships history. On November 20, 2013, it was announced that Cain was forgoing a college career in order to run professionally with the Nike Oregon Project. On December 3, 2013, she was named "Youth Athlete of the Year" by USATF. She was also Track and Field News "High School Athlete of the Year".

=== 2014 ===
On January 16, 2014, Cain set a new World Junior Indoor Record in the 1000 meters, running 2:39.25 at the Boston University Multi-Team Meet. Her time knocked about a second off of Diana Richburg's hand timed record from 1982. Cain won the race a breath ahead of Moser, who had passed Cain in the closing steps of the National Championships the previous year. East German Katrin Wühn set a faster, automatic time of 2:38.57 almost exactly 30 years earlier in 1984, but that was on an oversized track (a situation very similar to the University of Washington track described above) and therefore that time is not accepted as the record. A week later, in the Boston Terrier Invitational, Cain ran the mile in 4:24.11, improving her American Junior record and missing the world Junior record by .01. Her near even splits were estimated to be 65.5, 66.6, 65.9 and 66.1. On February 8, Cain returned to Boston, across town at the Reggie Lewis Track and Athletic Center at the New Balance Grand Prix to put the doubt about the 1000 metres to rest. Running with an elite field that included training partner Treniere Moser, she destroyed the earlier mark by running 2:35.80 while beating the field. Her mark was just over 1.6 seconds off of the open division American record. Two weeks later she won the USA Indoor Track and Field Championships in the 1500 metres. Moser was her closest competitor, almost 3 seconds back, the next closest competitor was almost 6 seconds back. Cain earned a silver medal at the 2014 USA Outdoor Track and Field Championships in the 1500 meters in Sacramento, California on June 27 and 29 running 4:06.34 in the final. Cain won a US Junior Outdoor title in Eugene, Oregon at the USATF Junior Outdoor Championships in the 3000 meters on July 5 running 9:15.81 and qualified for the 2014 World Junior Championships in Athletics, in which she won the Gold Medal. Her picture was published on the front cover of the USATF Rule Book for the upcoming 2015 season.

=== 2015 ===
Cain ran a season best 2:02.75 800 meters on Jan 31 at Armory Inv. At the 2015 New York Millrose Games, Cain finished eighth in the women's Wanamaker Mile, a loss she attributed to "growing pains". Cain then raced the 1500 meters at Occidental College for the Hoka One One USATF Mid Distance Classic in May - Cain finished 11th in 4:16.48 (almost 12 seconds slower than 2013 in the same meet) representing the Nike Oregon Project. Cain finished 8th in the 1500 meters final at USA Outdoor Track and Field Championships in Eugene, Oregon in 4:16.77. Cain's European summer season included season bests 3000 meters of 9:05.68 in Cork, Ireland and 1500 meters of 4:09.08 in Liège, Naimette-Xhovémont.

=== 2016 ===
Now representing the Nike Oregon Project, Cain opened her outdoor season with a time of 4:12.62 in the 1500 meters at the 2016 Drake Relays. A week later at 2016 Oregon Twilight on Pac-12 Network, she placed third in 2:08.50 at the 800 meters invitational at Hayward Field in Eugene, Oregon. On June 17, she finished third in a 1500 meters race in Boston Games in 4:10.84, behind Rachel Schneider and Cory McGee. On June 23, Cain placed third in the 1500 meters in 4:13.16 and eleventh in the 5000 meters in 15:49.32 at Mt. Hood Community College. She earned a 1500 roster spot on Team USA at the 2016 NACAC Under-23 Championships in Athletics, and at the 2016 US Olympic Trials in Eugene, Oregon. She earned a silver medal at the NACAC championship in San Salvador, El Salvador in the 1500 meters with a time of 4:16.86.

=== 2024 ===
Cain officially switched her allegiance to Ireland and became eligible to represent her adopted country beginning February 16, 2024.

=== Later ===
In October 2012, she had come under the coaching direction of Alberto Salazar, who would be banned for four years from athletics in 2019 for doping offenses, and who again in 2021 was banned, this time for life, by the United States Center for SafeSport for sexual misconduct. In late 2019, The New York Times published a video op-ed featuring Cain, where she attributed her decline in running performance to adverse coaching in the Nike Oregon Project. In it, Cain claimed that the head coach, Salazar, and his assistants arbitrarily set for her an unreasonably low goal weight, 114 pounds (52 kg). Cain alleged that Salazar routinely shamed her into meeting this weight, and that this, combined with the training regimens, pushed her body into the syndrome RED-S, involving lost menses, for some three years, whereby she accrued five bone fractures. Subsequently, Sports Illustrated published nine other accounts by former Nike Oregon Project runners, going back to 2008, who confirmed Cain's claims of "an abusive, toxic culture under Salazar."

On October 11, 2021, Cain filed a $20 million lawsuit against Salazar and his employer, Nike, accusing them of inflicting emotional and physical abuse. On November 27, 2023, a settlement was reached between Nike/Salazar and Cain. The terms of the settlement were not released to the public.

In April 2026, Cain released a memoir titled This Is Not About Running.

== Major competition record ==
Year	Competition	Venue	Position	Event	Notes
Representing the United States
2012	World Junior Championships	Barcelona, Spain	6th	1500m	4:09.48
2013	World Championships	Moscow, Russia	10th	1500m	4:07.19
2014	World Junior Championships	Eugene, Oregon, United States of America	1st	3000m	8:58.48
2016	NACAC U23 Championships	San Salvador, El Salvador	2nd	1500m	4:16.86

=== USA National Championships ===
Year	Competition	Venue	Position	Event	Notes
Representing the United States
2012	US Olympic Trials	Eugene, Oregon	18th	800m	2:04.11
2013	USA Outdoor Track and Field Championships	Des Moines, Iowa	2nd	1500m	4:28.76
2014	USA Indoor Track and Field Championships	Albuquerque, New Mexico	1st	1500m	4:07.05
2014	USA Outdoor Track and Field Championships	Sacramento, California	2nd	1500m	4:06.34
2015	USA Outdoor Track and Field Championships	Eugene, Oregon	8th	1500m	4:16.77
2016	US Olympic Trials	Eugene, Oregon	11th	1500m	4:13.45

== Personal bests ==
Surface	Distance	Time	Date	Venue	Note(s)
Outdoor	800m	1:59.51	2013, June 1	2013 Prefontaine Classic	US Natl HS record
Outdoor	1500m	4:04.62	2013, May 17	Oxy High Performance	US Natl HS record & NJR
Outdoor	3000m	8:58.48	2014, July 24	World Junior Championships	US Natl HS record
Outdoor	5000m	15:45.46	2013, June 8	Portland Track Classic	US Natl HS record
Indoor	1000m	2:35.80	2014, Feb 8	New Balance Grand Prix	World Indoor Junior Record
Indoor	1500m	4:06.63	2014, Jan 24	Boston University	US Natl Jr (en route to mile)
Indoor	Mile	4:24.11	2014, Jan 24	Boston University	US Natl Jr and WYB
Indoor	3000m	9:04.51	2013, Feb 2	NB Boston Indoor Games	
Indoor	2 Mile	9:38.68	2013, Feb 2	NB Boston Indoor Games	US Natl Jr & HS record

== Awards ==
- World Athletics Awards

Rising Star (Women)：2013

Awards
Preceded by Sydney Holden	USA Track & Field Youth Athlete of the Year; 2013	Succeeded by Myles Marshall
