= Mike Smith (running coach) =

American track and field coach (born 1980)

Biographical details
- Born: April 3, 1980 (age 46)

Playing career
- 1998–2000: James Madison
- 2000–2002: Georgetown

Coaching career (HC unless noted)
- 2006–2012: Team Run Flagstaff
- 2012–2016: Georgetown
- 2016–2025: Northern Arizona
- 2025-present: Nike Swoosh TC
- Born: Michael Smith
- Spouse: Rachel Schneider

Mike Smith (born April 3, 1980) is an American coach who was the director of cross country and track and field at Northern Arizona University from 2017 to 2025. As the head coach of the men's and women's programs, he led the men's teams to five NCAA Division I men's cross country championships titles. In 2025, he left NAU to coach professional athletes sponsored by Nike, while still based in Flagstaff, Arizona.

Smith has been credited with establishing a running dynasty at Northern Arizona. His coaching philosophy involves emphasizing "executing a great team race" at championships rather than focusing on the outcome.

== Prior to Northern Arizona University ==
As a runner, Smith competed for the Wachusett Regional High School Mountaineers where his team placed 2nd at the 1997 Massachusetts Interscholastic Athletic Association cross country championships. Smith also placed 8th at the 1998 New Balance Outdoor Nationals two-mile run.

After initially competing for James Madison University, Smith completed his collegiate running career at Georgetown University. After college, he worked as an elementary school teacher for two years and earned a master's degree. He did not compete during this time period. In 2006, he moved to Flagstaff, where he worked under Dr. Jack Daniels at the NAU Center for High Altitude Training and founded Team Run Flagstaff. During this time period, Smith competed in trail and road running and qualified for and competed in the 2008 U.S. Olympic Trials in the marathon. Following the closure of the Center for High Altitude Training in early 2009, Smith worked for Hypo2 helping organize altitude training camps for elite athletes in multiple sports.

Smith returned to Georgetown as a coach in 2012. He rose through the ranks to eventually become the Director of Cross Country and Track and Field during the 2015–2016 academic year.

== As director of Northern Arizona cross country and track ==
Smith joined the NAU cross country coaching staff in fall 2016 in anticipation of the retirement of the current head coach, Eric Heins. That season, the men's team built off of fourth, second, and fourth-place team finishes in the three preceding years to win the 2016 NCAA men's NCAA Division I title. Mike Smith officially became the Northern Arizona University's Director of Cross Country and Track in 2017.

In 2025, Smith departed NAU to lead a Nike-sponsored professional running team based in Flagstaff.

=== Men's NCAA DI cross country championship team results ===
Year	NCAA Champions	Runner-up	Score	Top-10 Individual Finishes
2017	NAU	Portland	74–127	2nd Matthew Baxter, 3rd Tyler Day, 8th Peter Lomong
2018	NAU	BYU	83–116	6th Tyler Day
2019	BYU	NAU	109–163	
2020	NAU	Notre Dame	60–87	4th Nico Young, 6th Blaise Ferro, 7th Abdihamid Nur, 9th Luis Grijalva
2021	NAU	Iowa State	92–137	7th Abdihamid Nur
2022	NAU	Oklahoma State	83–83* 3–2 tiebreak	2nd Nico Young, 3rd Drew Bosley
2023	Oklahoma State	NAU	49–71	5th Drew Bosley, 6th Nico Young

=== Women's NCAA DI cross country championship team results ===
Year	NAU Place	Top-10 Individual Finishes
2017	Did not qualify	
2018	Did not qualify	
2019	14th	
2020	11th	6th Taryn O'Neill
2021	23rd	
2022	6th	4th Elise Stearns
2023	2nd	

=== Individual NCAA titles and records ===
Under Smith, four male athletes have won indoor and NCAA Division I titles: Andy Trouard in the 3000 m in 2018, George Beamish in the mile in 2019, Abdihamid Nur in the 3000m and 5000m in 2022, and Nico Young in the 3000 m and 5000 m in 2024. As of the conclusion of the outdoor NCAA season in 2023, Smith has yet to win an NCAA outdoor title.

As of 2024, Smith's athletes hold collegiate records in the indoor 3,000 m (by Drew Bosley in 2023) and the absolute 5,000 m and 10,000 m records (by Nico Young in 2024). Smith-trained Abdihamid Nur previously held the 5,000 m record.

== Athletes trained by Mike Smith ==
=== Current ===
- Donavan Brazier (United States) (2025–present)
- Luis Grijalva (Guatemala) (2017–present)
- Elly Henes (United States) (2021–present)
- Woody Kincaid (United States) (2023–present)
- Abdihamid Nur (United States) (2017–present)
- Galen Rupp (United States) (2020–present)
- Colin Sahlman (United States) (2022–present)
- Rachel Smith (United States) (2013–present)
- Nico Young (United States) (2020–present)

=== Former ===
- Matt Baxter (New Zealand) (2016–2018)
- George Beamish (New Zealand) (2016–2020)
- Nikki Hiltz (United States) (2022–2025)
- Andy Trouard (United States) (2016–2018)
- Elly Henes (United States) (2022–2024)

== Championship results by professional athletes ==
Year	Meet	Athlete	Event	Place	Time
2015	USA Indoor Championships	Rachel Smith	Mile	3rd	4:35.85
2015	USA Championships	Rachel Smith	1,500 m	5th	4:16.09
2018	USA Championships	Rachel Smith	1,500 m	4th	4:08.33
2018	USA Championships	Rachel Smith	5,000 m	2nd	15:32.71
2019	USA Championships	Rachel Smith	5,000 m	4th	15:17.91
2019	World Championships	Rachel Smith	5,000 m	19th	15:30.00
2021	Olympic Games	Luis Grijalva	5,000 m	12th	13:10.09
2021	Olympic Games	Galen Rupp	Marathon	8th	2:11.41
2021	Olympic Games	Rachel Smith	5,000 m	17th	15:00.07
2022	USA Championships	Abdihamid Nur	5,000 m	3rd	13:08.63
2022	World Championships	Luis Grijalva	5,000 m	4th	13:10.44
2022	World Championships	Abdihamid Nur	5,000 m	11th	13:18.05
2023	USA Championships	Nikki Hiltz	1,500 m	1st	4:03.10
2023	USA Championships	Abdihamid Nur	5,000 m	1st	13:24.37
2023	USA Championships	Woody Kincaid	10,000 m	1st	28:23.01
2023	World Championships	Luis Grijalva	5,000 m	4th	13:12.50
2023	World Championships	Nikki Hiltz	1,500 m	11th (sf)	4:00.84
2023	World Championships	Abdihamid Nur	5,000 m	12th	13:23.90
2023	World Championships	Woody Kincaid	10,000 m	11th	28:08.71
2024	USA Indoor Championships	Nikki Hiltz	1,500 m	1st	4:08.35
2024	USA Indoor Championships	Abdihamid Nur	3,000 m	5th	7:58.65
2024	World Indoor Championships	Nikki Hiltz	1,500 m	2nd	4:02.32
2024	USA Olympic Trials	Nikki Hiltz	1,500 m	1st	3:55.33
2024	USA Olympic Trials	Woody Kincaid	10,000 m	2nd	27:50.74
2024	USA Olympic Trials	Abdihamid Nur	5,000 m	2nd	13:09.01
2024	USA Olympic Trials	Nico Young	10,000 m	3rd	27:52.40
2024	Olympic Games	Luis Grijalva	5,000 m	16th	13:58.81
2024	Olympic Games	Nikki Hiltz	1,500 m	7th	3:56.38
2024	Olympic Games	Abdihamid Nur	5,000 m	19th (h)	14:15.00
2024	Olympic Games	Woody Kincaid	10,000 m	16th	27:29.40
2024	Olympic Games	Nico Young	10,000 m	12th	26:58.11

== Personal ==
Smith was born in 1980 and was raised in Princeton, Massachusetts. Smith is married to professional runner Rachel Schneider (now Rachel Smith). They initially met at Georgetown University, where Smith coached Schneider. Both relocated to Flagstaff, AZ, and, while Smith continued to coach Schneider, the pair began dating. The couple has one child, Nova, born in 2023.
