= 2007 NCAA Division I cross country championships =

2007 cross-country running meet of the NCAA (Division I)

2007 NCAA Division I Cross Country Championships
- Organisers: NCAA
- Edition: 69th–Men; 27th–Women
- Date: November 19, 2007
- Host city: (Indiana) Terre Haute, IN
- Venue: Indiana State University; LaVern Gibson Championship Cross Country Course
- Distances: 10 km–Men; 6 km–Women
- Participation: 250–Men; 253–Women; 503–Total athletes

The 2007 NCAA Division I Cross Country Championships were the 69th annual NCAA Men's Division I Cross Country Championship and the 27th annual NCAA Women's Division I Cross Country Championship to determine the team and individual national champions of NCAA Division I men's and women's collegiate cross country running in the United States. In all, four different titles were contested: men's and women's individual and team championships.

Held on November 19, 2007, the combined meet was the fourth of eight consecutive meets hosted by Indiana State University at the LaVern Gibson Championship Cross Country Course in Terre Haute, Indiana. The distance for the men's race was 10 kilometers (6.21 miles) while the distance for the women's race was 6 kilometers (3.73 miles).

The men's team championship was won by Oregon (85 points), the Ducks' fifth (and first since 1977). The women's team championship was again won by Stanford (195 points), the Cardinal's fourth overall, second consecutive, and third in four years.

The two individual champions were, for the men, Josh McDougal (Liberty, 29:22.4) and, for the women, Sally Kipyego (Texas Tech, 19:30.9).

== Men's title ==
- Distance: 10,000 meters

=== Men's Team Result (Top 10) ===
Rank	Team	Points
1st place, gold medalist(s)	Oregon	85
2nd place, silver medalist(s)	Iona	113
3rd place, bronze medalist(s)	Oklahoma State	180
4	Northern Arizona	190
5	Wisconsin	239
6	Alabama	280
7	Colorado	287
8	Minnesota	322
9	Louisville	324
10	UTEP	331

=== Men's Individual Result (Top 10) ===
Rank	Name	Team	Time
1st place, gold medalist(s)	(United States) Josh McDougal	Liberty	29:22.4
2nd place, silver medalist(s)	(United States) Galen Rupp	Oregon	29:23.4
3rd place, bronze medalist(s)	(United States) Lopez Lomong	Northern Arizona	29:45.5
4	(United States) Robert Curtis	Villanova	29:46.3
5	(United States) Brent Vaughn	Colorado	29:47.4
6	(Kenya) Jacob Korir	Eastern Kentucky	29:48.7
7	(Kenya) Shadrack Songok	A&M-Corpus Christi	29:50.1
8	(United States) David Kinsella	Portland	29:52.2
9	(United States) Shadrack Kiptoo Biwott	Oregon	29:55.9
10	(Australia) David McNeill	Northern Arizona	29:56.8

== Women's title ==
- Distance: 6,000 meters

=== Women's Team Result (Top 10) ===
Rank	Team	Points
1st place, gold medalist(s)	Stanford	145
2nd place, silver medalist(s)	Oregon	177
3rd place, bronze medalist(s)	Florida State	236
4	Arizona State	251
5	Michigan State	321
6	Illinois	331
7	Northern Arizona	357
8	Washington	358
9	West Virginia	375
10	Iowa	387

=== Women's Individual Result (Top 10) ===
Rank	Name	Team	Time
1st place, gold medalist(s)	(Kenya) (United States) Sally Kipyego	Texas Tech	19:30.9
2nd place, silver medalist(s)	(United States) Jenny Barringer	Colorado	19:47.8
3rd place, bronze medalist(s)	(Netherlands) Susan Kuijken	Florida State	19:57.3
4	(Burundi) (United States) Diane Nukuri	Iowa	20:07.0
5	(United States) Nicole Bush	Michigan State	20:13.4
6	(United States) Emily Harrison	Virginia	20:15.0
7	(United Kingdom) Barbara Parker	Florida State	20:17.0
8	(United States) Nicole Blood	Oregon	20:17.6
9	(United States) Arianna Lambie	Stanford	20:18.2
10	(United States) Melissa Grelli	Georgetown	20:19.6
