= 2008 NCAA Division I cross country championships =

2008 cross-country running meet of the NCAA (Division I)

2008 NCAA Division I Cross Country Championships
- Organisers: NCAA
- Edition: 70th–Men; 28th–Women
- Date: November 24, 2008
- Host city: (Indiana) Terre Haute, IN
- Venue: Indiana State University; LaVern Gibson Championship Cross Country Course
- Distances: 10 km–Men; 6 km–Women
- Participation: 252–Men; 252–Women; 504–Total athletes

The 2008 NCAA Division I Cross Country Championships were the 70th annual NCAA Men's Division I Cross Country Championship and the 28th annual NCAA Women's Division I Cross Country Championship to determine the team and individual national champions of NCAA Division I men's and women's collegiate cross country running in the United States. In all, four different titles were contested: men's and women's individual and team championships.

Held on November 24, 2008, the combined meet was the fifth of eight consecutive meets hosted by Indiana State University at the LaVern Gibson Championship Cross Country Course in Terre Haute, Indiana. The distance for the men's race was 10 kilometers (6.21 miles) while the distance for the women's race was 6 kilometers (3.73 miles).

The men's team championship was again won by Oregon (93 points), the Ducks' second consecutive and sixth overall. The women's team championship was won by Washington (79 points), the Huskies' first.

The two individual champions were, for the men, Galen Rupp (Oregon, 29:03.2) and, for the women, Sally Kipyego (Texas Tech, 19:28.1). It was Kipyego's record third consecutive title.

== Men's title ==
- Distance: 10,000 meters

=== Men's Team Result (Top 10) ===
Rank	Team	Points
1st place, gold medalist(s)	Oregon	93
2nd place, silver medalist(s)	Iona	147
3rd place, bronze medalist(s)	Stanford	227
4	Wisconsin	229
5	Auburn	264
6	Northern Arizona	281
7	Portland	293
8	Oklahoma State	305
9	BYU	310
10	Georgetown	319

=== Men's Individual Result (Top 10) ===
Rank	Name	Team	Time
1st place, gold medalist(s)	(United States) Galen Rupp	Oregon	29:03.2
2nd place, silver medalist(s)	(United States) Samuel Chelanga	Liberty	29:08.0
3rd place, bronze medalist(s)	(Republic of Ireland) Andrew Ledwith	Iona	29:25.4
4	(United States) David Kinsella	Portland	29:26.5
5	(United States) Luke Puskedra	Oregon	29:27.8
6	(Morocco) Mohamed Khadraoui	Iona	29:29.3
7	(United States) Chris Derrick	Stanford	29:29.4
8	(Kenya) John Kosgei	Oklahoma State	29:32.4
9	(United States) Shadrack Kiptoo Biwott	Oregon	29:43.4
10	(United States) Kyle Perry	BYU	29:46.1

== Women's title ==
- Distance: 6,000 meters

=== Women's Team Result (Top 10) ===
Rank	Team	Points
1st place, gold medalist(s)	Washington	79
2nd place, silver medalist(s)	Oregon	131
3rd place, bronze medalist(s)	Florida State	163
4	West Virginia	198
5	Princeton	220
6	Villanova	248
7	Texas Tech	272
8	Stanford	299
9	Georgetown	305
10	Illinois	310

=== Women's Individual Result (Top 10) ===
Rank	Name	Team	Time
1st place, gold medalist(s)	(Kenya) Sally Kipyego	Texas Tech	19:28.1
2nd place, silver medalist(s)	(Netherlands) Susan Kuijken	Florida State	19:34.9
3rd place, bronze medalist(s)	(United States) Tasmin Fanning	Virginia Tech	19:37.1
4	(United States) Brianna Felnagle	North Carolina	19:53.3
5	(Puerto Rico) Racheal Marchand	Iowa	19:54.9
6	(United States) Angela Bizzarri	Illinois	19:59.1
7	(United States) Christine Babcock	Washington	20:01.7
8	(United States) Alex Kosinski	Oregon	20:04.2
9	(United States) Nicole Bush	Michigan State	20:07.6
10	(United States) Nicole Blood	Oregon	20:08.6
