= 2009 NCAA Division I cross country championships =

2009 cross-country running meet of the NCAA (Division I)

2009 NCAA Division I Cross Country Championships
- Organisers: NCAA
- Edition: 71st–Men; 29th–Women
- Date: November 23, 2009
- Host city: (Indiana) Terre Haute, IN
- Venue: Indiana State University; LaVern Gibson Championship Cross Country Course
- Distances: 10 km–Men; 6 km–Women
- Participation: 250–Men; 254–Women; 504–Total athletes

The 2009 NCAA Division I Cross Country Championships were the 71st annual NCAA Men's Division I Cross Country Championship and the 29th annual NCAA Women's Division I Cross Country Championship to determine the team and individual national champions of NCAA Division I men's and women's collegiate cross country running in the United States. In all, four different titles were contested: men's and women's individual and team championships.

Held on November 23, 2009, the combined meet was the sixth of eight consecutive meets hosted by Indiana State University at the LaVern Gibson Championship Cross Country Course in Terre Haute, Indiana. The distance for the men's race was 10 kilometers (6.21 miles) while the distance for the women's race was 6 kilometers (3.73 miles).

The men's team championship was won by Oklahoma State (127 points), the Cowboys' second overall and first since 1954. The women's team championship was won by Villanova (79 points), the Wildcats' eighth overall and first since 1998.

The two individual champions were, for the men, Samuel Chelanga (Liberty, 28:41.3) and, for the women, Angela Bizzarri (Illinois, 19:46.8).

== Men's title ==
- Distance: 10,000 meters

=== Men's Team Result (Top 10) ===
Rank	Team	Points
1st place, gold medalist(s)	Oklahoma State	127
2nd place, silver medalist(s)	Oregon	143
3rd place, bronze medalist(s)	Alabama	173
4	Northern Arizona	190
5	William & Mary	226
6	Colorado	315
7	Wisconsin	321
8T	New Mexico; Iona	350
10	Stanford	354

=== Men's Individual Result (Top 10) ===
Rank	Name	Team	Time
1st place, gold medalist(s)	(United States) Samuel Chelanga	Liberty	28:41.3
2nd place, silver medalist(s)	(Australia) David McNeill	Northern Arizona	29:06.5
3rd place, bronze medalist(s)	(United States) Chris Derrick	Stanford	29:14.8
4	(Kenya) Barnabas Kirui	Mississippi	29:24.1
5	(Zambia) Jordan Chipangama	Northern Arizona	29:33.1
6	(United States) Dorian Ulrey	Arkansas	29:37.9
7	(United States) Brandon Bethke	Arizona State	29:38.3
8	(United States) Andrew Bumbalough	Georgetown	29:39.1
9	(United States) Ryan Vail	Oklahoma State	29:40.7
10	(United States) Colby Lowe	Oklahoma State	29:42.4

== Women's title ==
- Distance: 6,000 meters

=== Women's Team Result (Top 10) ===
Rank	Team	Points
1st place, gold medalist(s)	Villanova	86
2nd place, silver medalist(s)	Florida State	133
3rd place, bronze medalist(s)	Washington	188
4	Texas Tech	191
5	Princeton	251
6	West Virginia	259
7	Florida	260
8	Duke	272
9	Oregon	276
10	Minnesota	310

=== Women's Individual Result (Top 10) ===
Rank	Name	Team	Time
1st place, gold medalist(s)	(United States) Angela Bizzarri	Illinois	19:46.8
2nd place, silver medalist(s)	(Canada) Kendra Schaaf	Washington	19:51.6
3rd place, bronze medalist(s)	(Netherlands) Susan Kuijken	Florida State	19:57.7
4	(United States) Catherine White	Virginia	19:59.5
5	(United States) Allie McLaughlin	Colorado	20:01.1
6	(United States) Amanda Marino	Villanova	20:02.4
7	(United States) Megan Duwell	Minnesota	20:06.9
8	(United States) Emily Infeld	Georgetown	20:07.9
9	(Kenya) Risper Kimaiyo	UTEP	20:10.9
10	(United States) Cecily Lemmon	BYU	20:11.9
