= 2013 NCAA Division I cross country championships =

2013 cross-country running meet of the NCAA (Division I)

2013 NCAA Division I Cross Country Championships
- Dates: November 23, 2013
- Host city: Terre Haute, Indiana; Indiana State University
- Venue: LaVern Gibson Cross Country Course
- Events: 4

The 2013 NCAA Division I Cross Country Championships included the 75th NCAA Men's Division I Cross Country Championship and the 33rd NCAA Women's Division I Cross Country Championship held at the LaVern Gibson Cross Country Course in Terre Haute, Indiana, near the campus of Indiana State University on November 23, 2013. Four cross country running championships were contested: men's and women's individual and team championships.

The men's team national championship was won by the Colorado Buffaloes, their fourth title, while the individual championship was won by Edward Cheserek from Oregon. The women's team championship was won by the Providence Friars, their second title, and the individual championship by Abbey D'Agostino of Dartmouth.

== Men's title ==
- Distance: 10,000 meters

=== Team (top 10) ===
Rank	Team	Points
1st place, gold medalist(s)	Colorado	149
2nd place, silver medalist(s)	Northern Arizona	169
3rd place, bronze medalist(s)	Oklahoma State	230
4	BYU	267
5	Oregon	274
6	Iona	284
7	Portland	293
8	Indiana	306
9	Wisconsin	326
10	Syracuse	329

=== Individual (top 10) ===
Rank	Name	Team	Time
1st place, gold medalist(s)	(Kenya) Edward Cheserek	Oregon	29:41.1
2nd place, silver medalist(s)	(Kenya) Kennedy Kithuka	Texas Tech	29:59.1
3rd place, bronze medalist(s)	(Kazakhstan) Maksim Korolev	Harvard	29:59.5
4	(Eritrea) (United States) Futsum Zienasellassie	Northern Arizona	30:05.7
5	(Puerto Rico) Jim Rosa	Stanford	30:08.9
6	(Kenya) (United States) Stanley Kebenei	Arkansas	30:10.1
7	(United States) Andrew Colley	NC State	30:12.5
8	(United States) Ben Saarel	Colorado	30:14.1
9	(Australia) Patrick Tiernan	Villanova	30:15.7
10	(United Kingdom) Luke Caldwell	New Mexico	30:17.2

== Women's title ==
- Distance: 6,000 meters

=== Team (top 10) ===
Rank	Team	Points
1st place, gold medalist(s)	Providence	141
2nd place, silver medalist(s)	Arizona	197
3rd place, bronze medalist(s)	Butler	200
4	Michigan	215
5	Georgetown	226
6	Michigan State	236
7	Colorado	265
8	Florida State	278
9	Virginia	283
10	New Mexico	301

=== Individual (top 10) ===
Rank	Name	Team	Time
1st place, gold medalist(s)	(United States) Abbey D'Agostino	Dartmouth	20:00.3
2nd place, silver medalist(s)	(United States) Emma Bates	Boise State	20:03.9
3rd place, bronze medalist(s)	(United Kingdom) Kate Avery	Iona	20:05.4
4	(United States) Aisling Cuffe	Stanford	20:05.4
5	(United States) Emily Lipari	Villanova	20:10.8
6	(United States) Colleen Quigley	Florida State	20:11.3
7	(United States) Emily Sisson	Providence	20:17.5
8	(United States) Shelby Houlihan	Arizona State	20:17.5
9	(United States) Shalaya Kipp	Colorado	20:21.7
10	(United States) Kelsey Santisteban	California	20:21.7

== See also ==
- NCAA Men's Division I Cross Country Championship
- NCAA Women's Division I Cross Country Championship
