= 2010 NCAA Division I cross country championships =

2010 cross-country running meet of the NCAA (Division I)

2010 NCAA Division I Cross Country Championships
- Organisers: NCAA
- Edition: 72nd–Men; 30th–Women
- Date: November 22, 2010
- Host city: (Indiana) Terre Haute, IN
- Venue: Indiana State University; LaVern Gibson Championship Cross Country Course
- Distances: 10 km–Men; 6 km–Women
- Participation: 246–Men; 253–Women; 499–Total athletes

The 2010 NCAA Division I Cross Country Championships were the 72nd annual NCAA Men's Division I Cross Country Championship and the 30th annual NCAA Women's Division I Cross Country Championship to determine the team and individual national champions of NCAA Division I men's and women's collegiate cross country running in the United States. In all, four different titles were contested: men's and women's individual and team championships.

Held on November 22, 2010, the combined meet was the seventh of eight consecutive meets hosted by Indiana State University at the LaVern Gibson Championship Cross Country Course in Terre Haute, Indiana. The distance for the men's race was 10 kilometers (6.21 miles) while the distance for the women's race was 6 kilometers (3.73 miles).

The men's team championship was again won by Oklahoma State (73 points), the Cowboys' second consecutive and third overall. The women's team championship was again won by Villanova (120 points), the Wildcats' second consecutive and ninth overall.

The two individual champions were, for the men, Samuel Chelanga (Liberty, 29:22.2) and, for the women, Sheila Reid (Villanova, 20:06.9).

== Men's title ==
- Distance: 10,000 meters

=== Men's Team Result (Top 10) ===
| Rank | Team | Points |
|---|---|---|
| 1st place, gold medalist(s) | Oklahoma State | 73 |
| 2nd place, silver medalist(s) | Florida State | 193 |
| 3rd place, bronze medalist(s) | Wisconsin | 223 |
| 4 | Stanford | 237 |
| 5 | Oklahoma | 281 |
| 6 | Oregon | 289 |
| 7 | Indiana | 298 |
| 8 | Iona | 303 |
| 9 | Northern Arizona | 317 |
| 10 | Arkansas | 329 |

=== Men's Individual Result (Top 10) ===
| Rank | Name | Team | Time |
|---|---|---|---|
| 1st place, gold medalist(s) | (Kenya) (United States) Samuel Chelanga | Liberty | 29:22.2 |
| 2nd place, silver medalist(s) | (Kenya) Stephen Sambu | Arizona | 29:26.5 |
| 3rd place, bronze medalist(s) | (United States) Luke Puskedra | Oregon | 29:38.0 |
| 4 | (Kenya) (United States) Leonard Korir | Iona | 29:42.0 |
| 5 | (United States) Chris Derrick | Stanford | 29:44.7 |
| 6 | (United States) Jake Riley | Stanford | 29:45.0 |
| 7 | (United States) Girma Mecheso | Oklahoma State | 29:47.5 |
| 8 | (United States) German Fernandez | Oklahoma State | 29:49.3 |
| 9 | (United States) Colby Lowe | Oklahoma State | 29:57.6 |
| 10 | (United States) Matthew Centrowitz | Oregon | 30:01.1 |

== Women's title ==
- Distance: 6,000 meters

=== Women's Team Result (Top 10) ===
| Rank | Team | Points |
|---|---|---|
| 1st place, gold medalist(s) | Villanova | 120 |
| 2nd place, silver medalist(s) | Florida State | 154 |
| 3rd place, bronze medalist(s) | Texas Tech | 165 |
| 4 | Georgetown | 167 |
| 5 | New Mexico | 227 |
| 6 | Colorado | 314 |
| 7 | Stony Brook | 334 |
| 8 | Iowa State | 341 |
| 9 | Providence | 343 |
| 10 | Syracuse | 347 |

=== Women's Individual Result (Top 10) ===
| Rank | Name | Team | Time |
|---|---|---|---|
| 1st place, gold medalist(s) | (Canada) Sheila Reid | Villanova | 20:06.9 |
| 2nd place, silver medalist(s) | (United States) Emily Infeld | Georgetown | 20:09.2 |
| 3rd place, bronze medalist(s) | (United States) Jordan Hasay | Oregon | 20:13.0 |
| 4 | (Kenya) Risper Kimaiyo | UTEP | 20:16.1 |
| 5 | (Kenya) Rose Tanui | Texas Tech | 20:17.6 |
| 6 | (New Zealand) Lucy Van Dalen | Stony Brook | 20:19.2 |
| 7 | (New Zealand) Holly Van Dalen | Stony Brook | 20:19.3 |
| 8 | (United States) Megan Hogan | George Washington | 20:19.6 |
| 9 | (Trinidad and Tobago) Pilar McShine | Florida State | 20:24.4 |
| 10 | (United States) Amanda Marino | Villanova | 20:26.1 |
