= Northern Arizona Lumberjacks cross country =

American college athletics team

Northern Arizona Lumberjacks Cross Country
- University: Northern Arizona University
- Head coach: Mike Smith (6th season)
- Conference: Big Sky
- Location: Flagstaff, AZ
- Nickname: Lumberjacks
- Colors: Blue and gold

Men's national championships
- 2016, 2017, 2018, 2020, 2021, 2022

Men's NCAA appearances
- 31

Women's NCAA appearances
- 18

Men's conference champions
- 1971, 1978, 1984, 1986, 1987, 1988, 1992, 1994, 1995, 1996, 1998, 1999, 2000, 2001, 2003, 2004, 2005, 2007, 2008, 2009, 2010, 2011, 2012, 2013, 2014, 2016, 2017, 2018, 2019, 2021, 2022, 2023, 2024

Women's conference champions
- 1987, 1988, 1989, 1990, 1991, 1992, 1996, 1998, 1999, 2001, 2002, 2003, 2004, 2005, 2007, 2008, 2009, 2014, 2016, 2017, 2019, 2020, 2021, 2022, 2023, 2024

Northern Arizona Lumberjacks cross country are the cross country teams of Northern Arizona University in Flagstaff, Arizona. The Lumberjacks compete in the Big Sky Conference at the Division I level in the NCAA, and are coached by Mike Smith.

The men's team have won six national championships and were runner up five times, and the women's team were the national runner up one time. Many of the team's runners compete in the Olympic Games, with alumni representing a total of 11 nations since the program's foundation.

== History ==
=== Men's team ===
The team was runner up at the NCAA Men's Division I Cross Country Championship in 1988, 1995, 2013, 2019, and 2023.

Since 2016, the Northern Arizona men's team has been considered the nation's leading program in NCAA Division I, winning a three-peat national championship run from 2016 to 2018 and being undefeated in the regular season. The team had won 20 of the last 25 Big Sky team championships and won 17 of the last 25 Big Sky individual titles, as of 2017. The team has been consistently ranked in the top three of the USTFCCCA national coach's poll since the start of the 2016 season. The team was the runner up in the 2019 national championship. In the first tie-breaker ever to win the national championship, the Lumberjacks narrowly won in 2022 over Oklahoma State University to complete another three-peat.

The 2017 repeat title closed out a perfect season with a 53-point victory, placing five athletes in the top 40. The victory was the lowest score (74) at the NCAA Championships since 2014, and the Lumberjacks became the first repeat champions since 2013–14. Director of cross country and track and field Mike Smith earned the Bill Dellinger Award as National Men's Coach of the Year, and also picked up both the Big Sky's Men's and Women's Coach of the Year awards. In track and field, Smith was named the US Track & Field and Cross Country Coaches Association (USTFCCCA) Mountain Region Women's Indoor Coach of the Year in 2017 and 2018.

=== Women's team ===
The women's team was national runner up at the NCAA Division I Cross Country Championship in 2023 by one point, behind North Carolina State.

== Notable athletes ==
=== Women's individual national championships (2) ===
Year	Athlete	Time
1986	Angela Chalmers	16:55.49
2005	Johanna Nilsson	19:33.9

Olympians

Athlete	Olympics	Event	Place
Angela Chalmers (Canada)	1988	1500m	17th (h)
Angela Chalmers (Canada)	1988	3000m	14th
Angela Chalmers (Canada)	1992	1500m	14th (h)
Angela Chalmers (Canada)	1992	3000m	3rd
Lopez Lomong (United States)	2008	1500m	SF1 12th
Lopez Lomong (United States)	2012	5000m	10th
David McNeill (Australia)	2016	10,000m	16th
David McNeill (Australia)	2020	5000m	H1 8th
Luis Grijalva (Guatemala)	2020	5000m	12th
Luis Grijalva (Guatemala)	2024	5000m	H2 16th
George Beamish (New Zealand)	2024	Steeplechase	H3 7th
Abdihamid Nur (United States)	2024	5000m	H2 19th
Nico Young (United States)	2024	10,000m	12th

== National championships ==
=== Men's team national championships (6) ===
Association	Division	Sport	Year	Runner up	Score
NCAA	Division I	Cross Country	2016	Stanford	125–158
NCAA	Division I	Cross Country	2017	Portland	74–127
NCAA	Division I	Cross Country	2018	BYU	83–116
NCAA	Division I	Cross Country	2020	Notre Dame	60–87
NCAA	Division I	Cross Country	2021	Iowa State	92–137
NCAA	Division I	Cross Country	2022	Oklahoma State	83–83* 3-2 tiebreak

Men's championship results

Year	Coach	Place	Points
2023	Mike Smith	2nd	71
2022	Mike Smith	1st	83
2021	Mike Smith	1st	92
2020	Mike Smith	1st	60
2019	Mike Smith	2nd	163
2018	Mike Smith	1st	82
2017	Mike Smith	1st	74
2016	Eric Heins	1st	125
2014	Eric Heins	4th	188
2013	Eric Heins	2nd	169
2012	Eric Heins	4th	191
2011	Eric Heins	14th	374
2010	Eric Heins	9th	217
2009	Eric Heins	4th	190
2008	Eric Heins	6th	281
2007	Eric Heins	4th	190
2004	John Hayes	24th	521
2003	Ron Mann	3rd	190
2002	Ron Mann	7th	247
2001	Ron Mann	4th	193
2000	Ron Mann	7th-Tie	269
1999	Ron Mann	12th	370
1998	Ron Mann	7th	295
1996	Ron Mann	12th	328
1995	Ron Mann	2nd	142
1994	Ron Mann	4th	181
1991	Ron Mann	19th	368
1990	Ron Mann	19th	421
1988	Ron Mann	2nd	160
1987	Ron Mann	8th	264
1986	Ron Mann	10th	269
1984	Ron Mann	17th	357
1971	Dr. Leo Haberlack	9th	294

Women's championship results

Year	Coach	Place	Points
2023	Mike Smith	2nd	124
2022	Mike Smith	6th	257
2021	Mike Smith	23rd	532
2020	Mike Smith	11th	318
2019	Mike Smith	14th	406
2008	Eric Heins	23rd	536
2007	Eric Heins	7th	357
2005	John Hayes	12th	388
2003	Ron Mann	15th	407
2002	Ron Mann	10th	333
2001	Ron Mann	12th	367
1999	Ron Mann	11th	381
1998	Ron Mann	17th	423
1996	Ron Mann	10th	261
1992	Ron Mann	9th	267
1991	Ron Mann	3rd	184
1990	Ron Mann	14th	317
1989	Ron Mann	13th	293
1988	Ron Mann	14th	291
1987	Ron Mann	11th	226

== Rivals ==
When Mike Smith became head coach in 2016, NAU became a national cross country powerhouse, developing a rivalry with the other nationally ranked leader, the BYU Cougars. NAU defeated BYU in the 2018 Championship, and the following year BYU defeated NAU in the 2019 Championship. The rivalry has been considered as "the best in a long time" and "the greatest in NCAA cross country history."

== Media ==
The team was exclusively featured in the FloTrack documentary The Program: Northern Arizona, which followed them in their championship 2016 season. The team was featured in the five-part docuseries NAU: Running With The Boys, which followed them throughout their 2019 season.

In 2023, former NAU runner Matt Baxter published Running Up the Mountain. The book chronicles the start of the Lumberjacks men's cross country dynasty as well as the team's connection to the Flagstaff community.
