= List of Iona Gaels men's basketball head coaches =

The following is a list of Iona Gaels men's basketball head coaches. There have been 15 head coaches of the Gaels in their 80-season history.

Iona's current head coach is Tobin Anderson. He was hired as the Gaels' head coach in March 2023, replacing Rick Pitino, who left to become the head coach at St. John's.

No.	Tenure	Coach	Years	Record	Pct.
1	1940–1946 (Note: Iona did not field a team from 1942 to 1945.)	Arthur Loftus	3	50–18	.735
2	1946–1947	Pete Caruso	1	15–8	.652
3	1947–1973	Jim McDermott	26	319–253	.558
4	1973–1975	Gene Roberti	2	15–32	.319
5	1975–1980	Jim Valvano	5	95–46	.674
6	1980–1986	Pat Kennedy	6	124–60	.674
7	1986–1991	Gary Brokaw	5	72–74	.493
8	1991–1995 (Note: Jerry Welsh resigned in February 1995 due to health concerns. Tim Welsh served as interim head coach for the remainder of the 1994–95 season.)	Jerry Welsh	4	47–63	.427
9	1995–1998 (Note: After serving as interim head coach for the end of the 1994–95 season, Tim Welsh was named permanent head coach in March 1995.)	Tim Welsh	4	70–22	.761
10	1998–2007	Jeff Ruland	9	139–135	.507
11	2007–2010	Kevin Willard	3	45–49	.479
12	2010–2019 (Note: Cluess took a leave of absence while tending to a medical issue for the 2019–20 season. Tra Arnold served as interim head coach for the season. In March 2020, Cluess resigned as head coach, having not coached in more than a year.)	Tim Cluess	9	199–108	.648
13	2019–2020*	Tra Arnold	1	12–17	.414
14	2020–2023	Rick Pitino	3	64–22	.744
15	2023–2025	Tobin Anderson	2	33–34	.493
16	2025–present	Dan Geriot	1	18–14	.563
Totals		16 coaches	80 seasons	1,317–955	.580
Records updated through end of 2025–26 season * - Denotes interim head coach. Source
