= 2016 NCAA Division I cross country championships =

2016 cross-country running meet of the NCAA (Division I)

2016 NCAA Division I Cross Country Championships
- Dates: November 19, 2016
- Host city: Terre Haute, Indiana; Indiana State University
- Venue: LaVern Gibson Cross Country Course
- Events: 4

The 2016 NCAA Division I Cross Country Championships were the 78th NCAA Men's Division I Cross Country Championship and the 36th NCAA Women's Division I Cross Country Championship to determine the national champions of men's and women's NCAA Division I collegiate cross country running. They were hosted by Indiana State University at the LaVern Gibson Cross Country Course in Terre Haute, Indiana on November 19, 2016. Four different championships will be contested: men's and women's individual and team championships.

== Women's title ==
- Distance: 6,000 meters
- (DC) = Defending champions

=== Women's Team Result (Top 10) ===
Rank	Team	Scorers					Points	Average Time
Rank	Team	1st	2nd	3rd	4th	5th	Points	Average Time
1st place, gold medalist(s)	Oregon Ducks	4	9	16	47	49	125	20:17
2nd place, silver medalist(s)	Michigan Wolverines	2	13	24	37	50	126	20:16
3rd place, bronze medalist(s)	Colorado Buffaloes	17	20	31	32	34	134	20:20
4	North Carolina State Wolfpack	12	19	38	67	78	223	20:31
5	Stanford Cardinal	29	30	52	66	78	255	20:36
6	San Francisco Dons	6	48	69	77	107	307	20:39
7	New Mexico Lobos ^{(DC)}	14	22	58	80	136	310	20:38
8	Michigan State Spartans	7	40	59	102	106	314	20:39
9	Eastern Michigan Eagles	18	54	64	79	101	316	20:41
10	BYU Cougars	26	56	65	86	95	328	20:43

=== Women's Individual Result (Top 10) ===
Women's race

Rank	Name	Team	Time	Points
1st place, gold medalist(s)	(United States) Karissa Schweizer	Missouri Tigers	19:41.7	1
2nd place, silver medalist(s)	(United States) Erin Finn	Michigan Wolverines	19:44.3	2
3rd place, bronze medalist(s)	(United States) Anna Rohrer	Notre Dame Fighting Irish	19:44.6	3
4	(United States) Katie Rainsberger	Oregon Ducks	19:51.1	4
5	(Kenya) Sharon Lokedi	Kansas Jayhawks	19:52.2	-
6	(United States) Brenna Peloquin	Boise State Broncos	19:54.6	-
7	(United States) Elinor Purrier	New Hampshire Wildcats	19:56.9	-
8	(United Kingdom) Amy-Eloise Neale	Washington Huskies	19:58.3	5
9	(United States) Grace Barnett	Clemson Tigers	20:02.4	-
10	(United Kingdom) Charlotte Taylor	San Francisco Dons	20:02.7	6

== Men's title ==
- Distance: 10,000 meters
- (DC) = Defending champions

=== Men's Team Result (Top 10) ===
Rank	Team	Scorers					Points	Average Time
Rank	Team	1st	2nd	3rd	4th	5th	Points	Average Time
1st place, gold medalist(s)	Northern Arizona	3	9	18	29	66	125	30:15
2nd place, silver medalist(s)	Stanford	4	19	32	45	58	158	30:23
3rd place, bronze medalist(s)	Syracuse ^{(DC)}	1	14	27	37	85	164	30:17
4	Ole Miss	5	30	42	48	71	196	30:29
5	Arkansas	12	16	36	53	89	206	30:30
6	Colorado	17	22	26	59	99	223	30:31
7	BYU	7	25	62	73	80	247	30:33
8	Wisconsin	6	20	51	52	127	256	30:33
9	Oregon	2	23	54	82	121	282	30:34
10	Iona	34	50	68	74	93	319	30:45

=== Men's Individual Result (Top 10) ===
Men's race

Rank	Name	Team	Time	Points
1st place, gold medalist(s)	(Australia) Patrick Tiernan	Villanova	29:20.0	–
2nd place, silver medalist(s)	(Canada) Justyn Knight	Syracuse	29:27.3	1
3rd place, bronze medalist(s)	(Kenya) Edward Cheserek ^{(DC)}	Oregon	29:48.0	2
4	(United States) Futsum Zienasellassie	Northern Arizona	29:49.8	3
5	(United States) Grant Fisher	Stanford	29:57.9	4
6	(United States) MJ Erb	Ole Miss	29:58.6	5
7	(Australia) Morgan McDonald	Wisconsin	29:59.2	6
8	(Kenya) Edwin Kibichiy	Louisville	29:59.6	–
9	(United States) Nicolas Montanez	BYU	30:02.3	7
10	(United States) Scott Carpenter	Georgetown	30:03.0	8

== See also ==
- NCAA Men's Division II Cross Country Championship
- NCAA Women's Division II Cross Country Championship
- NCAA Men's Division III Cross Country Championship
- NCAA Women's Division III Cross Country Championship
