= 2020 NCAA Division I cross country championships =

2020 cross-country running meet of the NCAA (Division I)

2020 NCAA Division I Cross Country Championships
- Edition: 82nd–Men; 40th–Women
- Date: March 15, 2021
- Host city: Stillwater, Oklahoma
- Distances: 10 km–Men; 6 km–Women

The 2020 NCAA Division I Cross Country Championships was the 82nd annual NCAA Men's Division I Cross Country Championship and the 40th annual NCAA Women's Division I Cross Country Championship to determine the team and individual national champions of NCAA Division I men's and women's collegiate cross country running in the United States. In all, four different titles were contested: men's and women's individual and team championships. Results were track and field results reporting system. In the men's 10k, Conner Mantz of Brigham Young University took home the individual title in 29:26.1, while Northern Arizona University won the team title, scoring 60 points and defeating second-placed University of Notre Dame (87) and third-placed Oklahoma State University (142). In the women's 6k, Mercy Chelangat of the University of Alabama won the individual title in 20:01.1, while Brigham Young University won the team title with 96 points, beating second-placed NC State University (161) and third-placed Stanford University (207).

Due to the COVID-19 pandemic the championship was delayed until March 2021.

== Women's title ==
- Distance: 6,000 meters
- (DC) = Defending champions

=== Women's Team Result (Top 10) ===
PL	Team	Total Time	Average Time	Score	1	2	3	4	5	(6)	(7)
1st place, gold medalist(s)	BYU	1:43:29	20:41	96	9	12	14	27	34	(92)	(151)
2nd place, silver medalist(s)	NC State	1:44:04	20:48	161	4	7	20	51	79	(101)	(189)
3rd place, bronze medalist(s)	Stanford	1:45:01	21:00	207	8	11	45	70	73	(125)	(148)
4	Michigan State	1:45:11	21:02	212	13	28	29	61	81	(96)	(168)
5	Minnesota	1:45:30	21:06	239	6	37	48	57	91	(167)	(200)
6	New Mexico	1:45:48	21:09	274	18	21	47	93	95	(113)	(144)
7	Colorado	1:46:08	21:13	279	15	58	60	69	77	(80)	(133)
8	Alabama	1:45:00	21:00	280	1	3	30	105	141	(204)	(214)
9	Boise State	1:46:33	21:18	304	32	41	62	75	94	(116)	(124)
10	Arkansas	1:46:28	21:17	316	17	52	59	84	104	(153)	(159)

=== Women's Individual result ===
Rank	Name	Team	Time
1st place, gold medalist(s)	(Kenya) Mercy Chelangat	Alabama	20:01.1
2nd place, silver medalist(s)	(United States) Taylor Roe	Oklahoma State	20:06.7
3rd place, bronze medalist(s)	(United States) Amaris Tyynismaa	Alabama	20:10.2
4	(United States) Mahala Norris	Air Force	20:11.8
5	(United States) Hannah Steelman	NC State	20:14.9
6	(Canada) Taryn O'Neill	Northern Arizona	20:23.0
7	(United States) Summer Allen	Weber State	20:23.3
8	(United States) Bethany Hasz	Minnesota	20:25.2
9	(United States) Kelsey Chmiel	NC State	20:26.4
10	(United States) Ella Donaghu	Stanford	20:26.7
11	(United States) Anna Camp	BYU	20:28.3
12	Nicole Fegans	Georgia Tech	20:29.5
13	Julia Heymach	Stanford	05:30.7
14	Emily Mackay	Binghamton	05:31.1
15	Aubrey Frentheway	BYU	05:31.2
16	Jenna Magness	Michigan State	05:31.2
17	Whittni Orton	BYU	05:31.4
18	Abby Nichols	Colorado	05:31.4
19	Grace Forbes	Rice	05:31.8
20	Kaylee Mitchell	Oregon State	05:32.2
21	Krissy Gear	Arkansas	05:32.4
22	Adva Cohen	New Mexico	05:32.4
23	Maudie Skyring	Florida State	05:32.7
24	Katelyn Tuohy	NC State	05:32.9
25	Gracelyn Larkin	New Mexico	05:33.0
26	Allie Schadler	Washington	05:33.6
27	Poppy Tank	Utah	05:34.2
28	Bailey Hertenstein	Indiana	05:34.3
29	Paige Hofstad	North Carolina	05:34.3
30	Kaley Richards	UMass Lowell	05:34.4
31	Anna Pataki	Portland	05:34.6
32	Maggie Donahue	Georgetown	05:35.5
33	Sara Musselman	BYU	05:35.6
34	Lynsie Gram	Michigan State	05:35.9
35	India Johnson	Michigan State	05:36.3
36	Esther Gitahi	Alabama	05:37.2
37	Batya Beard	Oregon State	05:37.3
38	Lindsey Stallworth	East Tennessee State	05:37.5
39	Tyler Beling	Boise State	05:37.7
40	Rebecca Clark	Florida State	05:37.8
41	McKenna Lee	BYU	05:37.9
42	Ceili McCabe	West Virginia	05:38.2
43	Katie Struthers	Utah State	05:38.4
44	Delaney Rasmussen	Northern Arizona	05:38.4
45	Abby Kohut-Jackson	Minnesota	05:38.4
46	Sasha Neglia	North Carolina	05:38.7
47	Sarah Chapman	Missouri	05:38.9
48	Lotte Black	Rhode Island	05:38.9
49	Anna Elkin	Ole Miss	05:38.9
50	Alison Pray	Southern Utah	05:39.1
51	Sintayehu Vissa	Ole Miss	05:39.2
52	Olivia Johnson	Boise State	05:39.2
53	Naomi Smith	Washington	05:39.3
54	Molly Born	Oklahoma State	05:39.4
55	Haley Herberg	Washington	05:39.5
56	Jessica Lawson	Stanford	05:39.8
57	Stella Gillman	Portland	05:40.0
58	Amelia Mazza-Downie	New Mexico	05:40.2
59	Anastasia Korzenowski	Minnesota	05:40.3
60	Loral Winn	Ole Miss	05:40.9
61	Kelsey Harrington	North Carolina	05:41.0
62	Lauren White	Boston College	05:41.3
63	Dominique Clairmonte	NC State	05:41.4
64	Logan Morris	Arkansas	05:41.6
65	Ericka VanderLende	Michigan	05:41.9
66	Adelyn Ackley	Liberty	05:42.1
67	Anneka Murrin	Loyola (IL)	05:42.2
68	Rebecca Craddock	Illinois	05:42.2
69	Caitlin Klopfer	Tulsa	05:42.3
70	Jaycie Thomsen	Minnesota	05:42.5
71	Amanda Vestri	Syracuse	05:42.7
72	Elizabeth Constien	Colorado	05:42.9
73	Abby Gray	Arkansas	05:43.0
74	Madison Boreman	Colorado	05:43.1
75	Makayla Perez	Michigan State	05:43.2
76	Ines Borba	Boise State	05:43.4
77	Liz Galarza	Georgia Tech	05:43.5
78	MacKenzie Yanek	San Francisco	05:43.9
79	Jessa Hanson	Northern Arizona	05:44.0
80	Ashley Tutt	Northern Illinois	05:44.0
81	Lauren Offerman	Colorado State	05:44.2
82	Maria Ahm	Elon	05:44.2
83	Annabelle Eastman	George Mason	05:44.3
84	Kathryn House	Michigan	05:44.5
85	Calli Doan	Liberty	05:44.7
86	Erika Freyhof	Nebraska	05:44.9
87	Micaela Degenero	Colorado	05:45.1
88	Christina Aragon	Stanford	05:45.2
89	Sami Corman	Georgetown	05:45.2
90	Samantha Tran	Michigan	05:45.3
91	Lydia Olivere	Villanova	05:45.3
92	Lucy Jenks	Stanford	05:45.4
93	Bryn Morley	Northern Arizona	05:45.6
94	Yukino Parle	Boise State	05:45.7
95	Bethany Graham	Furman	05:45.7
96	Emily Covert	Colorado	05:45.7
97	Ashlyn Hillyard	Colorado State	05:45.7
98	Savannah Shaw	NC State	05:45.8
99	Maria Coffin	Providence	05:45.8
100	Camille Jackson	Colorado	05:45.9
101	Katie Osika	Michigan State	05:46.1
102	Sarah Schmitt	Indiana	05:46.1
103	Skylar Boogerd	Ole Miss	05:46.2
104	Gracie Hyde	Arkansas	05:46.3
105	Sydney Seymour	Tennessee	05:46.4
106	Kayla Easterly	Florida State	05:46.4
107	Hannah Stoffel	Indiana	05:46.5
108	Jena Metwalli	Michigan	05:46.7
109	Winrose Chesang	Iowa State	05:46.7
110	Irene Rono	Abilene Christian	05:46.8
111	Audrey Lookner	Oregon State	05:47.0
112	Michaela Reinhart	Duke	05:47.0
113	Kailee Perry	Bowling Green	05:47.6
114	Megan Hasz	Minnesota	05:48.0
115	Haley Johnston	BYU	05:48.1
116	Semira Mebrahtu Firezghi	New Mexico	05:48.2
117	Carolien Millenaar	South Alabama	05:48.3
118	Courtney Brenner	Lipscomb	05:48.4
119	Sailor Hutton	Boise State	05:48.8
120	Leah Hansen	South Dakota State	05:48.8
121	Elise Thorner	New Mexico	05:48.9
122	Casey Mossholder	Michigan State	05:49.0
123	Erin Mullins	Washington State	05:49.1
124	Eve Jensen	San Francisco	05:49.2
125	Winny Koskei	Wichita State	05:49.4
126	Cailie Logue	Iowa State	05:49.4
127	Alyson Churchill	Florida State	05:49.5
128	Dana Feyen	Iowa State	05:49.7
129	Kristen Garcia	Gonzaga	05:49.8
130	Mariah Howlett	NC State	05:49.9
131	Camila David-Smith	Washington	05:50.0
132	Allison McGrath	Illinois	05:50.0
133	Corie Smith	Arkansas	05:50.1
134	Megan Patton	Alabama	05:50.1
135	Emily Chaston	Colorado State	05:50.1
136	Maddie Empey	Utah Valley	05:50.1
137	Ava Dobson	North Carolina	05:50.2
138	Baylee Jones	Georgetown	05:50.2
139	Olivia Howell	Illinois	05:50.3
140	Ivy Gonzales	Colorado State	05:50.4
141	Ashlyn Ramos	Bucknell	05:50.6
142	Victoria Patterson	Duke	05:50.7
143	Ayah Aldadah	Illinois	05:50.8
144	Annamaria Kostarellis	New Mexico	05:50.8
145	Victoria Simmons	Ole Miss	05:50.8
146	Samantha Schadler	Duke	05:51.2
147	Grace Brock	Boise State	05:51.2
148	Meagen Lowe	Oregon State	05:51.3
149	Ryann Helmers	Ole Miss	05:51.7
150	Katherine Dowie	West Virginia	05:51.8
151	Madison Heisterman	Washington	05:52.0
152	Kayla Windemuller	Michigan	05:52.2
153	Greta Van Calcar	Oregon State	05:52.3
154	Madelynne Cadeau	Furman	05:52.4
155	Christina Geisler	Boise State	05:52.5
156	Zofia Dudek	Stanford	05:52.5
157	Jaybe Shufelberger	Kansas State	05:52.5
158	Caroline Miller	Tulsa	05:52.6
159	Jodie Judd	Florida State	05:52.6
160	Madeleine King	Ole Miss	05:52.8
161	Andrea Claeson	Boston University	05:53.1
162	Sivan Auerbach	Oklahoma State	05:53.7
163	Sara Platek	Duke	05:53.7
164	Sofia Castiglioni	Portland	05:53.8
165	Alyssa Aldridge	Georgetown	05:54.1
166	Rachel McArthur	Colorado	05:54.5
167	Mary Claire Solomon	Georgia Tech	05:54.6
168	Emmeline Fisher	North Carolina	05:54.9
169	Mary Kathryn Knott	Georgia Tech	05:55.0
170	Maddie Dalton	Indiana	05:55.0
171	Jesselyn Bries	Northern Arizona	05:55.1
172	Zoe Wassell	San Francisco	05:55.5
173	Madelynn Hill	Iowa State	05:55.6
174	Sophie Spada	Alabama	05:55.7
175	Emma Milburn	Illinois	05:56.1
176	Emma Jenkins	Portland	05:56.3
177	Andrea Modin EngesÃ¦th	New Mexico	05:56.3
178	Alyssa Foote	Oregon State	05:56.4
179	Jonna Strange	Furman	05:56.6
180	Katharina Pesendorfer	Tulsa	05:57.1
181	Grace Connolly	Stanford	05:57.1
182	Noel Palmer	Liberty	05:57.3
183	Hayley Jackson	West Virginia	05:57.3
184	Lexy Halladay	BYU	05:57.9
185	Mikaela Lucki	Illinois	05:58.0
186	Gianna Sbarbaro	San Diego	05:58.1
187	Meghan Underwood	Arkansas	05:58.2
188	Brenna Cohoon	Iowa State	05:58.6
189	Alice Hill	Michigan	05:59.0
190	Janette Schraft	Iowa State	05:59.2
191	Katie Dammer	Georgetown	05:59.3
192	Alice Newcombe	Tulsa	05:59.4
193	Kennedy Thomson	Arkansas	06:00.0
194	Kelly Makin	Washington	06:00.2
195	Pipi Eitel	Northern Arizona	06:00.3
196	Annika Reiss	Northern Arizona	06:00.3
197	Jenny O'Bryan	Tulsa	06:00.3
198	Gemma Nuttall	Iona	06:01.0
199	Grace Dwyer	Liberty	06:01.1
200	Claire Moritz	Georgia Tech	06:01.2
201	Abi Little	Indiana	06:01.4
202	Tate Sweeney	Minnesota	06:01.7
203	Aimee Piercy	Michigan State	06:02.0
204	Jennifer Lima	Florida State	06:02.1
205	Andrea Markezich	Washington	06:02.3
206	Rilee Rigdon	Oklahoma State	06:02.8
207	Lily Tomasula-Martin	Colorado State	06:03.0
208	Antigone Archer	West Virginia	06:03.3
209	Famke Heinst	High Point	06:03.4
210	Taryn Parks	North Carolina	06:03.6
211	Katy Earwood	Georgia Tech	06:03.7
212	Laura Taborda	Eastern Kentucky	06:03.7
213	Priscillah Kiplagat	Liberty	06:03.8
214	Victoria Weir	Portland	06:03.8
215	Marie Hostetler	Liberty	06:03.8
216	Amanda Beach	Duke	06:04.0
217	Grace Dickel	Iowa State	06:04.1
218	Caroline Howley	Duke	06:04.3
219	Jenna Barker	Indiana	06:04.8
220	Grace Fetherstonhaugh	Oregon State	06:04.9
221	Sarah Carter	Colorado State	06:05.5
222	Samantha Prusse	Portland	06:06.2
223	Charlotte Tomkinson	Duke	06:06.6
224	Baneet Bains	San Francisco	06:06.6
225	Mary Hennelly	Georgetown	06:07.0
226	Julia Zachgo	NC State	06:07.1
227	Heidi Demeo	Oklahoma State	06:07.2
228	Mikenna Vanderheyden	West Virginia	06:07.9
229	Maegan Doody	Georgetown	06:08.1
230	Devon Peterson	Colorado State	06:08.8
231	Veerle Bakker	Portland	06:09.2
232	Emma Bower	Liberty	06:09.3
233	Layla Roebke	Tulsa	06:09.7
234	Kenzie Walls	Georgia Tech	06:10.0
235	Katie Hohe	Illinois	06:10.8
236	Abbey Yuhasz	Tulsa	06:10.9
237	Bit Klecker	Minnesota	06:11.0
238	Kalii Caldwell	San Francisco	06:11.2
239	Ana Barrott	Indiana	06:11.4
240	Ashley Dana	Central Connecticut	06:12.4
241	Mady Clahane	North Carolina	06:12.8
242	Jami Reed	Alabama	06:13.2
243	Emily Little	Furman	06:13.4
244	Lilly Lavier	Oklahoma State	06:14.4
245	Petal Palmer	West Virginia	06:15.5
246	Abigail Pradere	San Francisco	06:16.9
247	Marianne Abdalah	West Virginia	06:20.3
248	Yasmine Abbes	Florida State	06:22.6
249	Nicole Matysik	Furman	06:24.6
250	Gabby Hentemann	Oklahoma State	06:24.9
251	Anna Tait	San Francisco	06:43.9
252	Riley Schelp	Alabama	06:50.6
253	Megan Marvin	Furman	06:55.8
	Meg Swietlik	Milwaukee	
	Katelynne Hart	Michigan	
	Beth Donnelly	Furman	

== Men's title ==
- Distance: 10,000 meters

=== Men's Team Result (Top 10) ===
PL	Team	Total Time	Average Time	Score	1	2	3	4	5	6	7
1st place, gold medalist(s)	Northern Arizona	2:31:06	30:13	60	3	5	6	8	38	54	129
2nd place, silver medalist(s)	Notre Dame	2:31:56	30:23	87	9	18	19	20	21	31	193
3rd place, bronze medalist(s)	Oklahoma State	2:32:59	30:35	142	7	15	23	30	67	158	194
4	Arkansas	2:33:57	30:47	181	10	33	34	49	55	140	175
5	Stanford	2:34:10	30:50	194	13	14	39	60	68	85	121
6	Tulsa	2:34:22	30:52	237	4	11	17	75	130	135	
7	BYU	2:34:11	30:50	254	1	12	69	70	102	108	
8	Iowa State	2:35:00	31:00	265	2	35	45	77	106	113	126
9	Southern Utah	2:35:36	31:07	270	28	41	44	74	83	99	120
10	Iona	2:35:48	31:09	311	22	26	48	97	118	162	171

=== Men's Individual Result (Top 10) ===
Rank	Name	Team	Time
1st place, gold medalist(s)	(United States) Conner Mantz	BYU	29:26.1
2nd place, silver medalist(s)	(South Africa) Adriaan Wildschutt	Florida State	29:48.2
3rd place, bronze medalist(s)	(Kenya) Wesley Kiptoo	Iowa State	29:54.9
4	(United States) Nico Young	Northern Arizona	29:58.3
5	(United Kingdom) Patrick Dever	Tulsa	30:00.0
6	(United States) Blaise Ferro	Northern Arizona	30:02.0
7	(United States) Abdihamid Nur	Northern Arizona	30:05.3
8	(United States) Isai Rodriguez	Oklahoma State	30:08.3
9	(Guatemala) Luis Grijalva	Northern Arizona	30:10.2
10	(United States) Danny Kilrea	Notre Dame	30:11.5

== See also ==
- NCAA Men's Division II Cross Country Championship
- NCAA Women's Division II Cross Country Championship
- NCAA Men's Division III Cross Country Championship
- NCAA Women's Division III Cross Country Championship

== Results ==
- 2020 NCAA Division I Cross Country Championships live results
