= Rachel Smith (runner) =

American long-distance runner (born 1991)

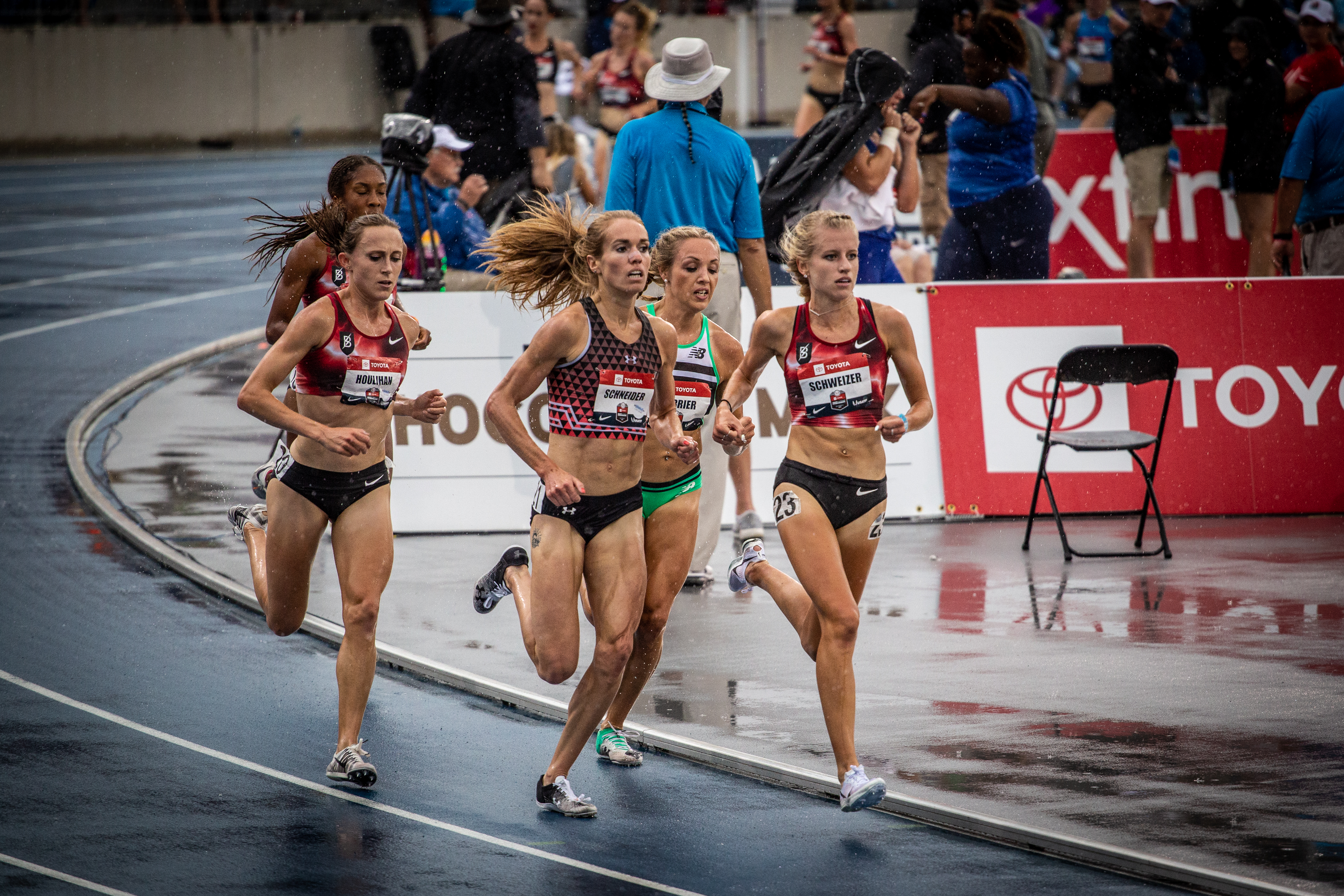
- Smith in 2019 (middle)

Personal information
- Born: July 18, 1991 (age 34) Sanford, Maine, United States

Sport
- Country: United States
- Sport: Long-distance running
- Turned pro: 2014

Rachel Smith (née Schneider, born July 18, 1991) is an American middle- and long-distance runner. She competed collegiately for Georgetown University. Smith represented the United States at the 2019 World Athletics Championships in Doha and at the 2020 Summer Games in Tokyo.

== Career ==
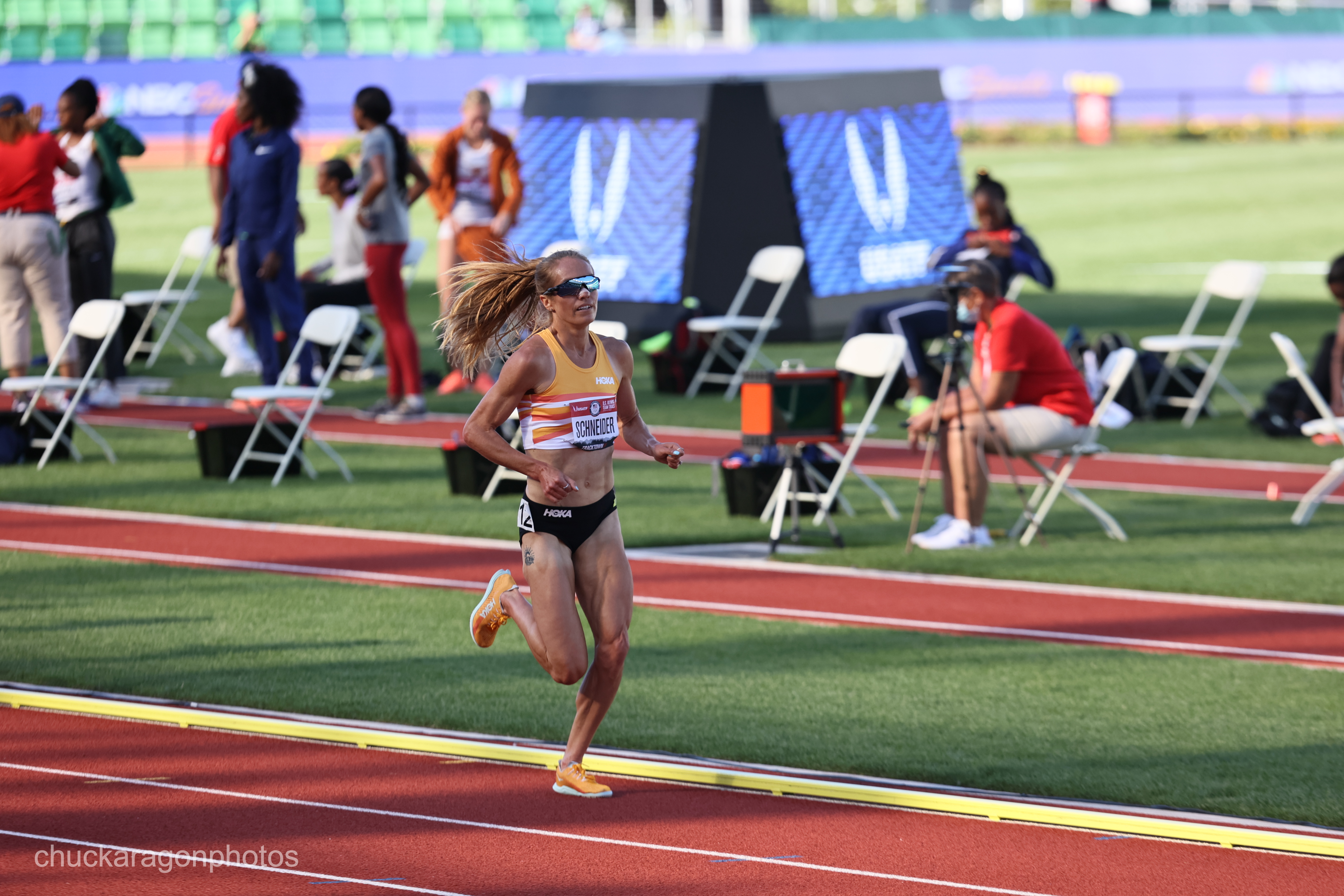
Smith competes at the 2020 US Olympic Trials.

Born and raised in Sanford, Maine, Smith began running track in junior high, while attending St. Thomas High School in Dover, New Hampshire. She went on to attend Georgetown University in Washington, D.C., where she became a Big East Conference champion, school-record holder, and earned multiple All-American honors. After completing a graduate degree at Georgetown, she moved to Flagstaff, Arizona, to compete professionally for Under Armour. In 2021, she switched sponsorship to Hoka One One, with coaching by Mike Smith.

In 2019, Smith competed in the women's 5000 metres at the World Athletics Championships held in Doha, Qatar, where she did not advance to the final. In April 2021, she won the USATF road mile championship, ahead of Shannon Osika and Heather Kampf. On June 21, 2021, she finished third in the 2020 US Olympic Trials in the 5000 m, qualifying for the 2020 Summer Games. At the Olympics, she competed in a preliminary round but did not advance to the final.

As of May 24, 2021, Smith has run several of the fastest times ever by an American woman: sixth-fastest mile (4:20.91 in Monaco), the 13th-fastest 5000 m (14:52.04 at Irvine, California), and the tenth-fastest 10000 m (31:09.79 at San Juan Capistrano, California).

== Personal ==
Smith is married to athletics coach Mike Smith, the director of cross country and track and field at Northern Arizona University. They have two daughters, Nova, born in 2023 and Harper born in 2025.

== Achievements ==
Results sourced from athlete's profile on World Athletics.

=== Team USA ===
Year	Competition	Venue	Position	Event	Notes
Representing United States
2010	2010 World Junior U20 Championships	Moncton, Canada	19th	1500 m	4:20.99
2015	2015 NACAC Championships in Athletics	San José, Costa Rica	1st	1500 m	4:14.78
2018	2018 Athletics World Cup	London, United Kingdom	2nd	1500 m	4:08.04
2018	2018 NACAC Championships in Athletics	Toronto, Canada	1st	5000 m	15:26.19
2018	2018 NACAC Championships in Athletics	Toronto, Canada	4th	1500 m	4:09.50
2019	The Match Europe v USA	London, United Kingdom	2nd	3000 m	9:00.77
2019	2019 World Athletics Championships	Doha, Qatar	19th	5000 m	15:30.00
2021	Olympic Games	Tokyo, Japan	17th	5000 m	15:00.07

=== USA Track and Field National Championships ===
Year	Competition	Venue	Position	Event	Notes
2007	Nike Indoor Nationals	Landover, Maryland	8th	Mile	5:08
2008	Nike Indoor Nationals	Landover, Maryland	5th	Mile	5:01.24
2010	USATF Junior Championships	Des Moines, Iowa	2nd	1500 m	4:27.26
2011	2011 NCAA Division I Women's Indoor Track and Field Championships	College Station, Texas	7th	DMR	11:07.84
2011	2011 NCAA Division I Women's Outdoor Track and Field Championships	Des Moines, Iowa	12th	1500 m	4:18.52
2012	2012 NCAA Division I Women's Indoor Track and Field Championships	Nampa, Idaho	4th	DMR	11:06.53
2012	2012 NCAA Division I Outdoor Track and Field Championships	Des Moines, Iowa	17th	1500 m	4:16.15
2013	NCAA Division I Women's Indoor Track and Field Championships	University of Arkansas	6th	DMR	11:01.31
2013	NCAA Division I Women's Indoor Track and Field Championships	University of Arkansas	9th	Mile	4:43.84
2013	USA Outdoor Track and Field Championships	Des Moines, Iowa	22nd	1500 m	4:20.47
2014	2014 NCAA Division I Outdoor Track and Field Championships	Eugene, Oregon	9th	1500 m	4:21.15
2015	2015 USA Indoor Track and Field Championships	Boston, Massachusetts	3rd	Mile	4:35.85
2015	2015 USA Outdoor Track and Field Championships	Eugene, Oregon	5th	1500 m	4:16.09
2016	2016 USA Indoor Track and Field Championships	Portland, Oregon	8th	1500 m	4:19.48
2016	2016 USA Olympic Trials	Eugene, Oregon	17th	1500 m	4:13.43
2018	2018 USA Indoor Track and Field Championships	Albuquerque, New Mexico	7th	1500 m	4:16.71
2018	2018 USA Outdoor Track and Field Championships	Des Moines, Iowa	4th	1500 m	4:08.33
2018	2018 USA Outdoor Track and Field Championships	Des Moines, Iowa	2nd	5000 m	15:32.71
2019	2019 USA Cross Country Championships	Tallahassee, Florida	12th	10 km	34:04
2019	USA Track & Field Road Championships	Jacksonville, Florida	6th	15 km	51:40
2019	2019 USA Outdoor Track and Field Championships	Des Moines, Iowa	4th	5000 m	15:17.91
2020	2020 USA Indoor Track and Field Championships	Albuquerque, New Mexico	6th	1500 m	4:14.87
2020	2020 USA Indoor Track and Field Championships	Albuquerque, New Mexico	9th	3000 m	9:16.06
2021	2020 USA Olympic Trials	Eugene, Oregon	3rd	5000 m	15:28.11
2021	2020 USA Olympic Trials	Eugene, Oregon	5th	10,000 m	31:42.92

=== NCAA ===
Results sourced from athlete's profile on Track & Field Results Reporting Service (TFRRS).

Year	Competition	Venue	Position	Event	Notes
Representing Georgetown Hoyas
2014	NCAA Division I Outdoor Track and Field Championships	University of Oregon	9th	1500 m	4:21.15
2014	Eastern College Athletic Conference/IC4A Championships	Princeton, New Jersey	2nd	800 m	2:06.46
2014	Big East Conference Outdoor Track and Field Championships	Villanova University	6th	1500 m	4:20.03
2014	Big East Conference Outdoor Track and Field Championships	Villanova University	2nd	4x800 Metres Relay	8:34.02
2014	Penn Relays	University of Pennsylvania	3rd	4x800 Metres Relay	8:31.03
2014	Millrose Games	Fort Washington Avenue Armory	11th	One Mile	4:36.42
2013	USA Outdoor Track and Field Championships	Drake University	22nd	1500 m	4:20.47
2013	NCAA Division I Indoor Track and Field Championships	Randal Tyson Track Center	6th	Distance Medley Relay	11:01.31
2013	NCAA Division I Indoor Track and Field Championships	Randal Tyson Track Center	9th	One Mile	4:43.84
2013	Big East Conference Indoor Track and Field Championships	Geneva, Ohio	3rd	1000 m	2:46.86
2013	Big East Conference Indoor Track and Field Championships	Geneva, Ohio	3rd	4x800 Metres Relay	8:41.36
2013	Big East Conference Indoor Track and Field Championships	Geneva, Ohio	4th	Distance Medley Relay	11:08.31
2012	NCAA Division I Outdoor Track and Field Championships	Drake University	9th	1500 M	4:16.15
2012	Big East Conference Outdoor Track and Field Championships	University of South Florida	5th	800 m	2:06.15
2012	Big East Conference Outdoor Track and Field Championships	University of South Florida	4th	4 × 800 m	8:39.35
2012	Penn Relays	University of Pennsylvania	2nd	4 × 1500 m relay	17:40.99
2012	Penn Relays	University of Pennsylvania	3rd	4 × 800 m relay	8:32.67
2012	Mt. SAC Relays	Mount San Antonio College	6th	1500 m	4:16.21
2012	NCAA Division I Indoor Track and Field Championships	Boise State University	4th	Distance Medley Relay	11:06.53
2012	Big East Conference Indoor Track and Field Championships	Fort Washington Avenue Armory	3rd	1000 m	2:48.63
2012	Big East Conference Indoor Track and Field Championships	Fort Washington Avenue Armory	3rd	4x800 Metres Relay	8:42.95
2011	NCAA Division I Outdoor Track and Field Championships	Drake University	7th	1500 M	4:18.52
2011	Big East Conference Outdoor Track and Field Championships	Villanova University	7th	1500 M	4:27.58
2011	Penn Relays	University of Pennsylvania	2nd	4 × 1500 m relay	17:25.65
2011	Penn Relays	University of Pennsylvania	2nd	4 × 800 m relay	8:26.47
2011	Mt. SAC Relays	Mount San Antonio College	5th	1500 m	4:19.50
2011	NCAA Division I Indoor Track and Field Championships	Texas A&M University	7th	Distance Medley Relay	11:07.84
2011	Big East Conference Indoor Track and Field Championships	Akron, Ohio	3rd	One Mile	5:00.82
2010	NCAA Division I Outdoor Track and Field Championships	University of Oregon	18th	1500 M	4:24.25
2010	Big East Conference Outdoor Track and Field Championships	University of Cincinnati	6th	1500 m	4:30.88
2010	Big East Conference Outdoor Track and Field Championships	University of Cincinnati	1st	4 × 800 m	8:41.11
2010	Eastern College Athletic Conference/IC4A Championships	Princeton, New Jersey	6th	800 M	2:07.98
2010	Penn Relays	University of Pennsylvania	9th	Distance Medley Relay	11:19.27
2010	Penn Relays	University of Pennsylvania	6th	4 × 800 m relay	8:35.84
2010	NCAA Division I Indoor Track and Field Championships	University of Arkansas	3rd	Distance medley relay	11:01.40
2010	Big East Conference Indoor Track and Field Championships	Fort Washington Avenue Armory	4th	1000 m	2:48.44
