= 2022 NCAA Division I cross country championships =

2022 NCAA Division I Cross Country Championships
- Edition: 84th–Men; 42nd–Women
- Date: November 19, 2022 8:00 AM CST
- Host city: Stillwater, Oklahoma
- Venue: Oklahoma State University Cross Country Course
- Distances: 10 km–Men; 6 km–Women

The 2022 NCAA Division I Cross Country Championships was the 84th annual NCAA Men's Division I Cross Country Championship and the 42nd annual NCAA Women's Division I Cross Country Championship to determine the team and individual national champions of NCAA Division men's and women's collegiate cross country running in the United States.

These championships were hosted by Oklahoma State University at the OSU Cross Country Course in Stillwater, Oklahoma.

In all, four different titles were contested: men's and women's individual and team championships.

== Television ==
ESPN will broadcast on television and there will be streaming on ESPN2, ESPN3, and ESPNU.

== Women's Team Result (Top 10) ==
| PL | Team | Total Time | Average Time | Score | 1 | 2 | 3 | 4 | 5 | (6) | (7) |
|---|---|---|---|---|---|---|---|---|---|---|---|
| 1st place, gold medalist(s) | NC State | 1:39:43 | 19:56.7 | 114 | 1 | 2 | 13 | 24 | 74 | (80) | (98) |
| 2nd place, silver medalist(s) | New Mexico | 1:40:47 | 20:09.5 | 140 | 20 | 23 | 31 | 32 | 34 | (89) | (118) |
| 3rd place, bronze medalist(s) | Alabama | 1:40:26 | 20:05.3 | 166 | 5 | 8 | 12 | 14 | 127 | (185) | (211) |
| 4 | Oklahoma State | 1:41:02 | 20:12.6 | 201 | 6 | 11 | 47 | 62 | 75 | (123) | (183) |
| 5 | North Carolina | 1:41:40 | 20:20.1 | 242 | 15 | 35 | 50 | 54 | 88 | (106) | (125) |
| 6 | Northern Arizona | 1:41:37 | 20:19.6 | 257 | 3 | 40 | 55 | 78 | 81 | (87) | (91) |
| 7 | Notre Dame | 1:41:36 | 20:19.4 | 261 | 7 | 45 | 56 | 69 | 84 | (104) | (170) |
| 8 | BYU | 1:41:54 | 20:22.9 | 263 | 27 | 29 | 58 | 59 | 90 | (135) | (168) |
| 9 | Virginia | 1:41:56 | 20:23.3 | 268 | 37 | 39 | 46 | 53 | 93 | (131) | (163) |
| 10 | Georgetown | 1:41:54 | 20:23.0 | 271 | 19 | 33 | 48 | 72 | 99 | (157) | (179) |

== Women's Individual Result (Top 10) ==
| Position | Name | Team | Time |
|---|---|---|---|
| 1st place, gold medalist(s) | Katelyn Tuohy | NC State | 19:27.7 |
| 2nd place, silver medalist(s) | Parker Valby | Florida | 19:30.9 |
| 3rd place, bronze medalist(s) | Kelsey Chmiel | NC State | 19:37.1 |
| 4 | Elise Stearns | Northern Arizona | 19:43.9 |
| 5 | Bailey Hertenstein | Colorado | 19:45.1 |
| 6 | Hilda Olemomoi | Alabama | 19:45.6 |
| 7 | Natalie Cook | Oklahoma State | 19:46.3 |
| 8 | Olivia Markezich | Notre Dame | 19:46.4 |
| 9 | Amaris Tyynismaa | Alabama | 19:48.2 |
| 10 | Addie Engel | Ohio State | 19:50.4 |

== Men's Team Result (Top 10) ==
| PL | Team | Total Time | Average Time | Score | 1 | 2 | 3 | 4 | 5 | (6) | (7) |
|---|---|---|---|---|---|---|---|---|---|---|---|
| 1st place, gold medalist(s) | Northern Arizona | 2:26:01 | 29:12.4 | 83 | 2 | 3 | 18 | 24 | 36 | (79) | (127) |
| 2nd place, silver medalist(s) | Oklahoma State | 2:26:06 | 29:13.4 | 83 | 5 | 8 | 11 | 29 | 30 | (50) | (117) |
| 3rd place, bronze medalist(s) | BYU | 2:27:01 | 29:24.3 | 132 | 7 | 20 | 28 | 33 | 44 | (45) | (49) |
| 4 | Stanford | 2:27:34 | 29:31.0 | 195 | 1 | 10 | 48 | 67 | 69 | (101) | (162) |
| 5 | Wake Forest | 2:28:12 | 29:38.5 | 204 | 19 | 21 | 25 | 53 | 86 | (99) | (144) |
| 6 | Wisconsin | 2:28:19 | 29:39.8 | 212 | 15 | 32 | 42 | 51 | 72 | (76) | (159) |
| 7 | Air Force | 2:28:59 | 29:48.0 | 264 | 27 | 46 | 54 | 66 | 71 | (80) | (92) |
| 8 | Colorado | 2:29:05 | 29:49.1 | 281 | 34 | 40 | 64 | 65 | 78 | (94) | (98) |
| 9 | Tulsa | 2:29:18 | 29:51.7 | 304 | 14 | 22 | 41 | 58 | 169 | (188) | (201) |
| 10 | North Carolina | 2:29:27 | 29:53.6 | 323 | 9 | 59 | 68 | 91 | 96 | (113) | (163) |

== Men's Individual Result (Top 10) ==
| Position | Name | Team | Time |
|---|---|---|---|
| 1st place, gold medalist(s) | Charles Hicks | Stanford | 28:43.6 |
| 2nd place, silver medalist(s) | Nico Young | Northern Arizona | 28:44.5 |
| 3rd place, bronze medalist(s) | Drew Bosley | Northern Arizona | 28:55.9 |
| 4 | Dylan Jacobs | Tennessee | 28:58.0 |
| 5 | Alex Maier | Oklahoma State | 28:58.2 |
| 6 | Graham Blanks | Harvard | 28:58.4 |
| 7 | Casey Clinger | BYU | 28:58.7 |
| 8 | Isai Rodriguez | Oklahoma State | 28:59.9 |
| 9 | Parker Wolfe | North Carolina | 29:00.4 |
| 10 | Ky Robinson | Stanford | 29:07.4 |

== See also ==
- NCAA Men's Division II Cross Country Championship
- NCAA Women's Division II Cross Country Championship
- NCAA Men's Division III Cross Country Championship
- NCAA Women's Division III Cross Country Championship

== Results ==
- 2022 NCAA Division I Cross Country Championships results
