= Sam Chelanga =

Kenyan-born American long-distance runner

Samuel Chelanga
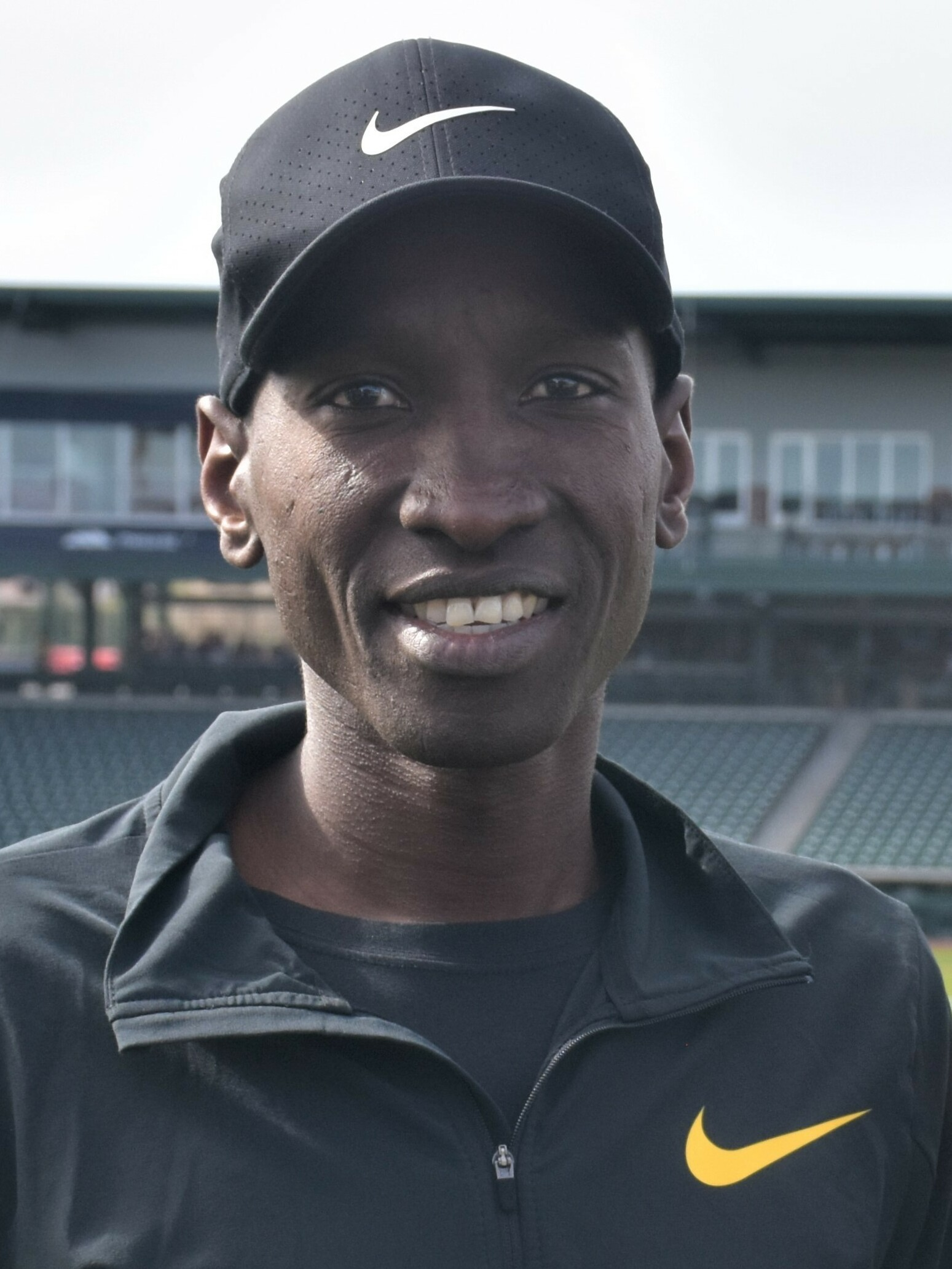
- Chelanga in 2023

Personal information
- Nationality: American
- Born: February 23, 1985 (age 41) Baringo, Kenya
- Height: 5 ft 7 in (1.70 m)

Sport
- Sport: Track, Track and field, long-distance running
- Events: 5000 metres, 10,000 meters
- College team: Liberty University
- Club: Nike
- Turned pro: 2011
- Now coaching: Scott Simmons

Achievements and titles
Personal bests
Half Marathon	1:00:37 (2018)
10,000 meters	27:08.39 (2012)
5000 metres	13:04.35 (2014)
Medal record
Men's athletics
Representing United States
Pan American Games
Silver medal – second place	2023 Santiago	10,000 m

Samuel Chelanga (born February 23, 1985) is a Kenyan-born American track and field athlete who competed for Liberty University in Lynchburg, Virginia, from 2008 to 2011. He set the NCAA record for the 10,000 meters run with a time of 27:08.49 set at the Payton Jordan Cardinal Invitational at Palo Alto, California, on May 1, 2010. (That record was broken by Nico Young on March 16, 2024.) His brother, Joshua Chelanga, is a professional marathon runner.

== Early life ==
Sam Chelanga was born in Kabarsel village, Baringo County, Kenya, and was the 10th of 11 children.

== Running career ==
=== Collegiate ===
Originally hailing from Baringo County, Kenya, Chelanga moved to the United States on a sports scholarship. After first competing for the Fairleigh Dickinson Knights track and field team, he attended Liberty University, with whom he won the 2009 NCAA Men's Cross Country Championship in Terre Haute, Indiana, and set a course record in 28:41.3. He won a third consecutive title at the Big South Conference cross country championships in October, leading the race by a margin of over half a minute. In 2010, he defended his title by winning the NCAA cross country championship, becoming only the 11th man in NCAA history to win at least two such titles. He ended his time at Liberty University with fourteen All-American distance honours.

Year	Meet	Venue	Time	Place
2011	NCAA Division I Outdoor Track and Field Championships	Drake Stadium – Des Moines, Iowa	13:29.30	1st
2011	NCAA Division I Outdoor Track and Field Championships	Drake Stadium – Des Moines, Iowa	28:12.18	2nd
2011	NCAA Division I Indoor Track and Field Championships	Texas A&M-Gilliam Indoor Track Stadium – College Station	13:27.34	2nd
2011	NCAA Division I Indoor Track and Field Championships	Texas A&M-Gilliam Indoor Track Stadium – College Station	8:11.15	15th
2011	Big South Conference Indoor Championships	Clemson-Indoor Track Facility – Clemson, South Carolina	4:16.88	1st
2010	NCAA Division I Cross Country Championships	LaVern Gibson Championship Cross Country Course – Terre Haute, Indiana	29:22.1	1st
2010	NCAA Division I Outdoor Track and Field Championships	Drake Stadium – Des Moines, Iowa	13:45.35	2nd
2010	NCAA Division I Outdoor Track and Field Championships	Drake Stadium – Des Moines, Iowa	28:37.40	1st
2010	NCAA Division I Indoor Track and Field Championships	Arkansas-Randall Tyson Track – Fayetteville, Arkansas	13:37.01	2nd
2010	Big South Conference Indoor Championships	Clemson-Indoor Track Facility – Clemson, South Carolina	4:13.75	1st
2010	Big South Conference Indoor Championships	Clemson-Indoor Track Facility – Clemson, South Carolina	8:14.07	1st
2009	NCAA Division I Cross Country Championships	LaVern Gibson Championship Cross Country Course – Terre Haute, IN	28:41.3	1st CR
2009	Big South Conference Outdoor Championships	Radford Patrick D. Cupp Track – Radford, Virginia	14:01.89	1st
2009	Big South Conference Outdoor Championships	Radford Patrick D. Cupp Track – Radford, Virginia	3:49.69	1st

=== Professional ===
Chelanga signed a contract with Nike and made his professional race debut at the B.A.A. 10K in Boston in June 2011 under Jerry Schumacher and managed to take fourth place.

In November 2013, he won the 77th Manchester Road Race (4.748 miles), an annual race held on Thanksgiving Day in Manchester, Connecticut, in a time of 21 minutes, 31 seconds. Chelanga ran a 13:04.35 at Boston University's BU Multi-Team Meet, coming in second. He came in second behind his old college rival Galen Rupp, who won in 13:01.26 – a new American indoor 5k record.

From 2013 to January 2015, Chelanga trained with Dartmouth College alumnus Ben True in Hanover, New Hampshire.

In January 2015, Chelanga joined coach James Li in Tucson, Arizona.

At the 2016 US Olympic Trials, Chelanga finished the 10,000 meters in sixth place, a minute behind winner Galen Rupp. But he was the third fastest in the race to hold a sub-28:00.00 qualifying time.

=== 2014 annual bests ===
Event	Result	Venue	Date
Mile	4:02.90	Falmouth, US	August 16, 2014
3000m ind.	7:45.21	Boston, US	February 8, 2014
5000m	13:16.24	Berlin, Germany	August 31, 2014
5000m ind.	13:04.35	Boston, US	January 16, 2014
10,000m	27:59.74	Eugene, US	May 30, 2014
8 km Road	22:45	Kingsport, US	July 12, 2014
10 km Road	28:11	Boston, US	June 22, 2014
Half Marathon	1:02:59	Philadelphia, US	September 20, 2014

=== Seasonal best ===
10k
Date	Time	Place
May 1, 2016	27:54.57	Palo Alto, California
May 30, 2014	27:59.74	Eugene, Oregon
December 12, 2013	27:46.06	Melbourne (Albert Park)
29 APR2012	27:29.82	Palo Alto, California
June 10, 2011	28:12.18	Des Moines, Iowa
May 1, 2010	27:08.39	Palo Alto, California
April 24, 2009	27:28.48	Berkeley, California
May 4, 2008	28:15.99	Palo Alto, California

=== 2015 ===
Carlsbad 5000 Results:
1. @LawiLalang1 13:32
2. Wilson Too 13:35
3. @Lagat1500 13:40
4. @SamChelanga 13:50

Wharf to Wharf Santa Cruz to Capitola 6 mile results:
1. Sam Chelanga 27:24.48
2. Shadrack Kosgei 27:27
3. John Muritu Watiku 27:28

43rd New Balance Falmouth Road Race
August 16
Chelanga finished 4th place 32:21 only 4 seconds behind the winner Stephen Sambu.

USA 5 km Championships CVS/pharmacy Downtown 5k Providence, Rhode Island
September 20,
1. David Torrence 13:56.0
2. Dan Huling 13:59.0
3. Dathan Ritzenhein 14:03.0
4. Sam Chelanga 14:07.0

USA 10 mile championship on October 4
1. Sam Chelanga 46:47
2. Tyler Pennel
3. Dathan Ritzenhein

=== 2016 ===
Chelanga placed third in the 2016 New York Half Marathon in 1:01:43 on March 20, 2016.

Chelanga placed first in Credit Union Cherry Blossom Ten Mile Run in Washington, D.C. He ran 10 Miles Road in 48:26 on April 3, 2016. The first American male win at @CUCB since Greg Meyer in 1983.

He placed fifth in the 2016 Payton Jordan Invitational 10,000m in 27:54.57 at Stanford University on May 1, 2016.

Chelanga qualified for the 2016 US Olympic Trials (track and field) at 2016 Hoka One One Mid Distance Classic May 20 hosted by Occidental College by running 5000 metres in 13:27.53.

Chelanga placed sixth in the 10,000 m in 28:56.12 and 22nd in 5000 meters in 13:59.52 at 2016 United States Olympic Trials (track and field).

Chelanga placed second in 59:16 at USATF 20 km Championships at Faxon Law New Haven Road Race.

In October 2016, Chelanga won the USATF 10 miles (16 km) Championships at the Medtronic TC 10 Mile. At the time, Chelanga was running for Team USA Minnesota.

=== 2017 ===
Chelanga took home fourth place in 30:22.2 at 10 km at 2017 USATF cross country championships on February 4, 2017.

Chelanga placed first at NACAC 10 km road race on February 26, 2017.

Chelange placed first at World best 10 km Road in February in San Juan, Puerto Rico, in a time of 28:19.

Chelanga placed third in 15 km Road in March in Jacksonville, Florida, in a time of 43:28.

In May Chelanga served as a pacer for Nike's Breaking2 attempt at achieving a sub-2-hour marathon time.

Chelanga placed ninth in 10,000m at 2017 USA Outdoor Track and Field Championships in June in Sacramento in a time of 29:08.29.

Chelanga placed third in 10 km road in July at Atlanta Journal-Constitution Peachtree Road Race in a time of 28:25 and first at Quad-City Times Bix 7 in a time of 32:53.

Chelanga placed third in September at Faxon Law New Haven Road Race 20 km in a time of 59:16.

Chelanga placed 15th in October at 2017 Chicago Marathon in a time of 2:15:02.

=== 2018 ===
Chelanga placed seventh at 2018 Aramco Half Marathon in 1:00:37. Chelanga ran the sixth fastest American time all-time for the half marathon behind Ryan Hall (59:43 14 January 2007 in Houston Texas), Leonard Korir (59:52 19 November 2017 in New Delhi India), Dathan Ritzenhein (60:00 1 October 2009 in Birmingham England), Abdihakem Abdirahman (60:29 5 August 2007 in New York NY), and Galen Rupp (60:29 20 March 2011 in New York NY).

== Personal bests ==
- Updated May 17, 2014.

Surface	Event	Time	Date	Place
Outdoor track	5000 m	13:09.67	June 2, 2012	Eugene, Oregon
Outdoor track	10,000 m	27:08.49	May 1, 2010	Palo Alto, California
Indoor track	3000 m	7:45.21	February 8, 2014	Boston (Roxbury), Massachusetts
Indoor track	5000 m	13:04.35	January 16, 2014	Boston (Boston Univ.), Massachusetts
Road	10 km	28:11	June 23, 2014	Boston, Massachusetts
Road	Half marathon	1:00:37	January 14, 2018	Houston, Texas
