= Jim McDermott (basketball) =

Biographical details
- Born: April 6, 1910
- Died: June 2, 2009 (aged 99)

Coaching career (HC unless noted)

Basketball
- 1947–1973: Iona

Baseball
- 1947–1963: Iona

Administrative career (AD unless noted)
- 1956–1976: Iona
- 1980–1984: MAAC (commissioner)

Head coaching record
- Overall: 320–252 (basketball)

Peter James McDermott (April 6, 1910 – June 2, 2009) was an American basketball and baseball coach and college athletics administrator. He served as the head basketball coach at Iona College in New Rochelle, New York from 1947 to 1973, compiling a record of 320–252. McDermott was also the head baseball coach at Iona from 1947 to 1963 and the school's athletic director from 1956 to 1976. He was the first commissioner of the Metro Atlantic Athletic Conference (MAAC).
