= Nico Young =

American distance runner (born 2002)

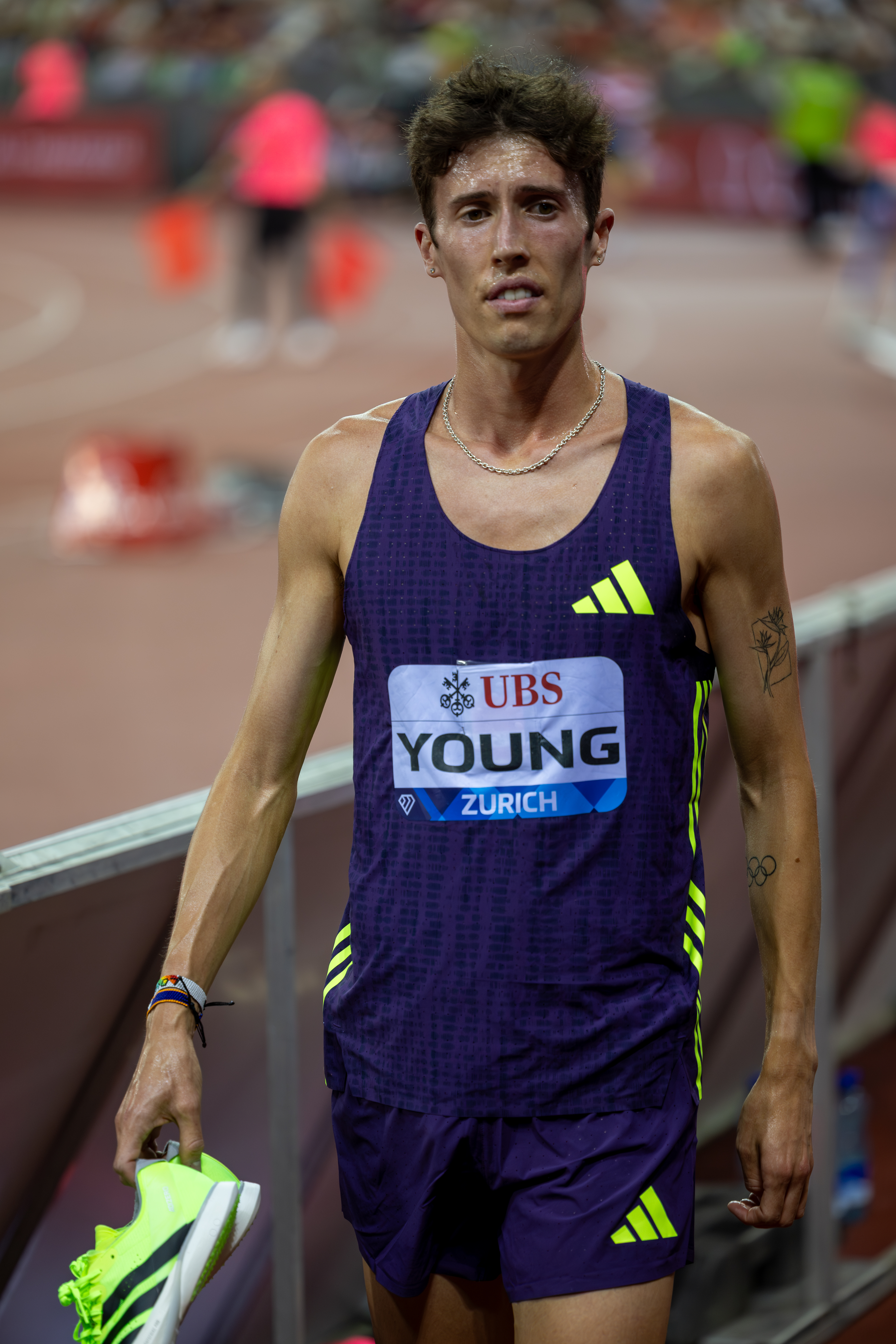
- Young at the 2026 Weltklasse Zürich

Personal information
- Nationality: American
- Born: July 27, 2002 (age 24)
- Home town: Camarillo, California

Sport
- Country: United States
- Sport: Track and field
- Events: 5000 metres; 10000 metres
- University team: Northern Arizona Lumberjacks
- Club: Adidas
- Coached by: Sean Brosnan (2016–2020); Michael Smith (2020–present)

Achievements and titles
- National finals: 2025 Eugene; 5000 m, Bronze; 10,000 m, Gold; 2024 Eugene; 10,000 m, Bronze
- Personal bests: All information from athlete's World Athletics profile.: Outdoors; 800 m: 1:47.65 (Tucson 2024); 1500 m: 3:34.56 (Los Angeles 2024); 5000 m: 12:45.27 AR NR (Oslo 2025); 10,000 m: 26:52.72 (San Juan Capistrano 2024); Indoors; 800 m: 1:49.61 (Spokane 2024); Mile: 3:48.72 (Seattle 2025); 3000 m: 7:33.32 (Winston-Salem 2026); 5000 m: 12:51.56 (Boston 2025)
Medal record
Men's athletics
Representing the United States
Representing Northern Arizona Lumberjacks/ Big Sky Conference
NCAA Cross Country Championships
Gold medal – first place	2020 Stillwater	Team Gold
Gold medal – first place	2021 Tallahassee	Team Gold
Gold medal – first place	2022 Stillwater	Team Gold
Silver medal – second place	2022 Stillwater	10 km
Silver medal – second place	2023 Charlottesville	Team Silver
NCAA Indoor Track and Field Championships
Gold medal – first place	2024 Boston	5000 meters
Gold medal – first place	2024 Boston	3000 meters
Bronze medal – third place	2022 Birmingham	Team 4th place
Bronze medal – third place	2022 Birmingham	5000 meters
NCAA Outdoor Track and Field Championships
Silver medal – second place	2024 Eugene	5000 meters
Bronze medal – third place	2022 Eugene	5000 meters

Nicolas Young (born July 27, 2002) is an American long-distance runner who holds the American record in the outdoor 5000 meters, with a time of 12:45.27. He is a two-time NCAA champion having won both the 3000 m and 5000 m at the 2024 NCAA Indoor Championships while competing for Northern Arizona University. He also holds the collegiate records in the 5000 m (12:57.14) and 10,000 m (26:52.72), both set in 2024. He is the current American champion in the 10,000 meters, winning at the 2025 USA Championships.

== Athletic career ==
=== High school career ===
Young ran for Newbury Park High School in Newbury Park, California. He broke the 3 mile cross country American high school record at the 2019 Woodbridge Classic, running a time of 13:39.7, and lowered the American high school indoor 3000m record (previously held by Drew Hunter), running a time of 7:56.91. At the 2019 Nike Cross Nationals, Young won the race and set the course record with a time of 14:52 and led Newbury Park to the team victory. Young was named the 2019-20 XC National Gatorade Player of the Year and the 2019-20 Track and Field National Gatorade Player of the Year. His senior season in 2020 was cancelled due to the COVID-19 pandemic.

==== High school personal bests ====
	Event	Time	Date	Location	Notes
Outdoor	800 m	2:06.8h	April 23, 2018	Newbury Park, California	
Outdoor	1600 m	4:07.33+	March 23, 2019	Azusa, California	
Outdoor	Mile	4:08.82	March 23, 2019	Azusa, California	
Outdoor	3000 m	8:11.02+	April 6, 2019	Arcadia, California	
Outdoor	3200 m	8:40.00	April 6, 2019	Arcadia, California	
Outdoor	5000 m	13:50.55	June 23, 2020	Portland, Oregon	
Indoor	1500 m	3:58.64+	January 29, 2019	Boston, Massachusetts	
Indoor	Mile	4:14.92	January 26, 2019	Boston, Massachusetts	
Indoor	3000 m	7:56.97	February 8, 2020	New York City, New York	Former High school record
XC	3 miles	13:39.7	September 20–21, 2019	Norco, California	Former high school record
XC	5 km	14:28.5	November 30, 2019	Fresno, California	

=== Collegiate career ===
==== 2020–2021 ====
During the 2020 cross country season, Young placed 4th at the 2020 NCAA Division I Cross Country Championships with a time of 29:58.3 at the 10 km distance, the highest a true freshman has placed since 2013. He set an American junior record in the 5000m at the 2021 Drake Relays with a time of 13:24.26. With this time he qualified for the 2021 U.S. Olympic Trials, where he ran 13:35.94 and finished 9th.

==== 2021–2022 ====
Later that year, Young placed 11th at the 2021 NCAA Division I Cross Country Championships with a time of 28:57.5, but he also lowered the American junior record in the indoor 5000m with a time of 13:22.59 at the BU Season Opener on December 4, 2021.

In 2022, Young placed 3rd in the 5000m and 7th in the 3000m at the 2022 NCAA Division I Indoor Track and Field Championships.

On May 6, Young ran 13:11.30 at the Sound Running Track Meet in San Juan Capistrano, which is the fastest 5000m ever run by an American teenager and the 3rd fastest outdoor 5000m in collegiate history. He ended up placing 3rd in the 5000m at the 2022 NCAA Division I Outdoor Track and Field Championships. At the 2022 USA Outdoor Track and Field Championships, Young placed 8th in the 5000m, running a time of 13:19.15.

==== 2022–2023 ====
During the 2022 cross country season, Young set a 10 km personal best of 28:01 at the NCAA Division I Mountain Region Cross Country Championships on November 11, 2022, before placing 2nd at the 2022 NCAA Division I Cross Country Championships with a time of 28:44.5. Two weeks later, Young lowered his indoor 5000m personal best to 13:15.25 at the BU Season Opener on December 3, 2022, finishing 5th in a field of collegiate and professional runners.

==== 2023–2024 ====
Young placed 6th at the 2023 NCAA Division I Cross Country Championships with a time of 29:04.2.

On January 26, 2024, at Boston University's John Thomas Terrier Classic, Young placed 2nd to Adrian Wildschutt's 12:56.76 in the men's 5000m White Heat, with a new personal best time of 12:57.14, defeating the 13:00.00 barrier, setting a new NCAA record, and hitting the Paris 2024 Olympics' qualifying standard of 13:05.00.

On March 8, 2024, Young won his first NCAA individual title at the 2024 NCAA Division I Indoor Track and Field Championships over 5000m. His last three 200m laps were recorded at 28.47, 27.10, and 27.29 seconds, respectively. He followed up the victory the next day with an NCAA title at 3000m in 7:41.01. North Carolina's Parker Wolfe finished second in both events, but was not within a second of Young in either.

Just one week after his double-gold performance at The Track at New Balance in Boston, Young made his debut in the 10,000 m on the track, competing at The TEN in San Juan Capistrano with the goal of achieving the Olympic qualifying standard of 27:00.00. Finishing in second place behind American-record holder Grant Fisher, Young broke the collegiate record of 27:08.49 set by Sam Chelanga, and hit the Olympic standard, running a time of 26:52.72. Later that month, on March 25, Young announced he had signed an NIL deal with Adidas, and would go pro.

Two weeks after the NCAA Outdoor Track and Field Championships, where he placed second in the 5000m to Parker Wolfe, Young competed in the 10,000m at the Olympic Trials. He out-kicked Drew Hunter to place third and qualify for the Olympic Games. At the Olympics, he placed 12th in the 10,000 m in 26:58.11.

==== Collegiate personal bests ====
	Event	Time	Date	Location	Notes
Outdoor	800 m	1:47.65	April 27, 2024	Tucson, Arizona	
Outdoor	1500 m	3:37.75	April 15, 2022	Azusa, California	
Outdoor	5000 m	13:11.30	May 6, 2022	San Juan Capistrano, California	
Outdoor	10,000 metres	26:52.72	March 16, 2024	San Juan Capistrano, California	Collegiate record
Indoor	800 m	1:54.21A	January 21, 2022	Flagstaff, Arizona	
Indoor	Mile	3:56.00	January 29, 2022	Seattle, Washington	
Indoor	5000 m	12:57.14	January 26, 2024	Boston, Massachusetts	Collegiate record
XC	8 km	22:30.8	February 9, 2021	North Las Vegas, Nevada	
XC	10 km	28:01.8	November 20, 2021	Albuquerque, New Mexico	

=== Professional career ===
==== 2025 ====
On March 2, at the Last Chance National Qualifier at Boston University, Young ran 12:51.56 in the short track 5000 meters, which stands as the second fastest time run by an American, behind Grant Fisher, who holds the world record at 12:44.09.

On June 1, Young won the 3000 meters at the Philadelphia Slam, in a time of 8:01.03. On June 12, he won the 5000 meters at the Bislett Games, in an American record time of 12:45.27.

On July 31, Young won a national title over the 10,000 meters at the 2025 United States Outdoor Track and Field Championships, outkicking Grant Fisher in a time of 29:02.12 to 29:02.37. On August 3, Young finished third to Fisher and Cole Hocker in the 5000 meters.

== Personal life ==
Young has younger twin brothers, Lex and Leo Young. All three brothers competed on the same team together at Newbury Park in 2019, when the twins were freshman and Nico was a senior. Both twins run collegiately at Stanford and have NIL deals with On.

Young is openly gay.

== Achievements ==
=== International competitions ===
Year	Competition	Venue	Position	Event	Time	Ref
2024	Olympic Games	Stade de France, Saint-Denis, France	12th	10,000 m	26:58.11	
2025	2025 World Athletics Championships	Tokyo, Japan National Stadium	6th	5000 m	13:00.07	
2025	2025 World Athletics Championships	Tokyo, Japan National Stadium	5th	10,000 m	28:56.62	

=== Circuit results ===
Grand Slam Track results
Slam	Race group	Event	Pl.	Time	Prize money
2025 Philadelphia Slam	Long distance	3000 m	1st	8:01.03	US$50,000

=== Diamond League ===
Year	Competition	Venue	Position	Event	Time	Ref
2025	Bislett Games	Oslo, Norway	1st	5000 m	12:45.27 AR NR	

=== National championships ===
Year	Competition	Venue	Position	Event	Time	Ref
2021	Olympic Trials	Hayward Field, Eugene, Oregon	9th	5000 m	13:35.94	
2022	USA Outdoor Track and Field Championships	Hayward Field, Eugene, Oregon	8th	5000 m	13:19.15	
2024	Olympic Trials	Hayward Field, Eugene, Oregon	3rd	10,000 m	27:52.40	
2025	USA Outdoor Track and Field Championships	Hayward Field, Eugene, Oregon	1st	10,000 m	29:02.12	
2025	USA Outdoor Track and Field Championships	Hayward Field, Eugene, Oregon	3rd	5000 m	13:27.05	

=== NCAA championships ===
Year	Competition	Venue	Position	Event	Time	Ref
2022	Division I Indoor Championships	Birmingham CrossPlex, Birmingham, Alabama	3rd	5000 m	13:21.23	
2022	Division I Indoor Championships	Birmingham CrossPlex, Birmingham, Alabama	7th	3000 m	8:00.83	
2022	Division I Outdoor Championships	Hayward Field, Eugene, Oregon	3rd	5000 m	13:28.62	
2022	Division I Cross Country Championships	OSU Cross Country Course, Stillwater, Oklahoma	2nd	10 km	28:44.5	
2023	Division I Indoor Championships	Albuquerque Convention Center, Albuquerque, New Mexico	4th	5000 m	13:40.55	
2023	Division I Outdoor Championships	Mike A. Myers Stadium, Austin, Texas	8th	5000 m	14:10.17	
2023	Division I Cross Country Championships	Panorama Farms, Charlottesville, Virginia	6th	10 km	29:04.2	
2024	Division I Indoor Championships	The TRACK at New Balance, Boston, Massachusetts	1st	5000 m	13:25.29	
2024	Division I Indoor Championships	The TRACK at New Balance, Boston, Massachusetts	1st	3000 m	7:41.01	
2024	Division I Outdoor Championships	Hayward Field, Eugene, Oregon	2nd	5000 m	13:54.65	
