= David McNeill (runner) =

Australian long-distance runner

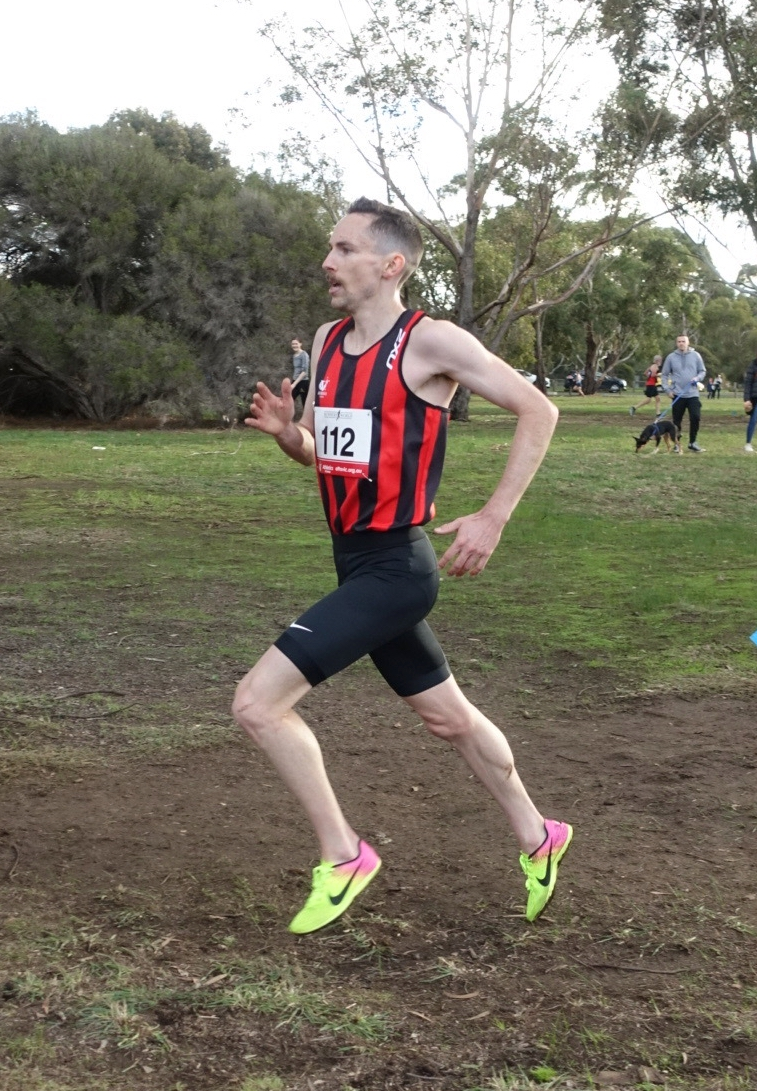
- David McNeill racing in Jells Park, Melbourne, 2019

Personal information
- Born: 6 October 1986 (age 39) East Melbourne, Australia

Sport
- Sport: Athletics
- Events: 3000 metres; 5000 metres; 10000 metres
- College team: Northern Arizona University
- Club: Old Xaverians Athletics Club

Achievements and titles
- Personal bests: Outdoor; 1500 m: 3:37.40 (Lignano Sabbiadoro 2021); 3000 m: 7:39.43 (Oslo 2021); 5000 m: 13:12.82 (Perth 2021); 10000 m: 27:45.01 (Palo Alto 2015); Indoor; 5000 m: 13:36.41 (Fayetteville 2010) NR
Medal record
Men's athletics
Representing AUS
Oceania Championships
Gold medal – first place	2024 Suva	5000 m

David McNeill (born 6 October 1986 in East Melbourne) is an Australian long-distance runner. He was selected for the Tokyo 2020 Summer Olympics, McNeill finished 8th in his heat of the Men's 5000m in a time of 13:39.97. He was therefore eliminated.

== Early years ==
McNeill was just 10-years-old when he started cross-country running. He had a natural ability and decided to focus on long-distance running full-time. He made his international debut in 2004 at the Commonwealth Youth (U18) Games running in the 3000m. After graduating from Xavier College in Kew Melbourne McNeill went to Northern Arizona University where he excelled. He was twice named to ESPN magazine's NCAA All-Academic First Team. In 2009 he was named the Division I Scholar-Athlete of the Year.

He is presently a member of the Old Xaverians Athletics Club.

== Achievements ==
At the 2012 Summer Olympics, he competed in the Men's 5000 metres, finishing 28th overall in Round 1, failing to qualify for the final.

On 2 May 2015, David ran a qualifying time of 27:45.01 to the 2015 World Championships in Athletics and Athletics at the 2016 Summer Olympics by finishing 4th at Payton Jordan Invitational 10 km.

At the 2016 Summer Olympics in Rio, David finished 16th in the 10,000m final in a time of 27:51.71.
