= LaVern Gibson Championship Cross Country Course =

Golf course in Terre Haute, Indiana

Coordinates: 39°27′30″N 87°15′53″W

- Interactive map of LaVern Gibson Championship Cross Country Course
- Address: 599 South Tabortown Street; Terre Haute, Indiana; United States

Tenants
- Indiana State Sycamores; Rose–Hulman Fightin' Engineers

Website
- www.laverngibson.com

The LaVern Gibson Championship Cross Country Course is a cross country course in Terre Haute, Indiana. The course is one of the few purpose-built cross country courses in the world. The facility is part of 250 acres (1.0 km^{2}) that comprise the Wabash Valley Family Sports Center just east of the Terre Haute International Airport. The course is built on a reclaimed coal mine and consists of an external loop of 3 km and four internal loops that allow for circuits of varying lengths. Indiana State University's cross country team uses the course for its home meets.

== History ==
The course was dedicated on October 17, 1997 for the Indiana Intercollegiate Championship. Since that time the facility has hosted multiple championship meets at the collegiate and high school level. The most prominent meet the facility has hosted has been the NCAA Division I Men's and Women's Cross Country Championships (2002, 2004–2011, 2013–2014, 2016, 2019, 2026). It has additionally hosted the NCAA Division III Men's and Women's Cross Country Championships in 2012 and 2024. In 2004, the course became the host site of the state high school championship meet for Indiana, as well as the Nike Cross Nationals (NXN) Midwest Regional Meet in 2009. It has also hosted numerous other invitational and conference championship meets since it opened.

== Course records ==
Race	Runner	School	Time	Race	Date
Collegiate Course Records
Women's 6k	Hannah Gapes	NC State University	18:57.6	2026 Under Armour Pre-National Invitational	10/16/2026
Women's 6k (old course)	Joanna Nilsson	Northern Arizona	19:33.9	2005 NCAA Championship	11/21/2005
Men's 8k	Sam Chelanga	Liberty	22:51.3	2008 Brooks Pre-Nationals White Race	10/18/2008
Men's 10k	Sam Chelanga	Liberty	28:41.2	2009 NCAA Championship	11/23/2009
High School Course Records
Girls 5k	Natasza Dudek	Pioneer High School (MI)	16:18.47	2025 Nike XC Nationals Midwest Regional	11/16/2025
Girls 4k (old course)	Alexandra Banfich	Culver Girls Academy (IN)	14:05.1	2005 Indiana HS State Championship	10/29/2005
Boys 5k	Hunter Jones	Benzie Central High School (Benzonia, MI)	14:21.8	2022 Nike Cross Nationals Midwest Regionals	11/13/2022
