= Portland Pilots =

Intercollegiate sports teams of University of Portland

- University: University of Portland
- Nickname: Pilots
- NCAA: Division I
- Conference: WCC (primary); MPSF (indoor track & field)
- Athletic director: Scott Leykam
- Location: Portland, Oregon
- Varsity teams: 14
- Basketball arena: Chiles Center
- Baseball stadium: Joe Etzel Field
- Soccer stadium: Merlo Field
- Other venues: Louisiana-Pacific Tennis Center
- Colors: Purple and white
- Mascot: Wally the Pilot
- Fight song: "University of Portland Victory March 1984"
- Website: portlandpilots.com
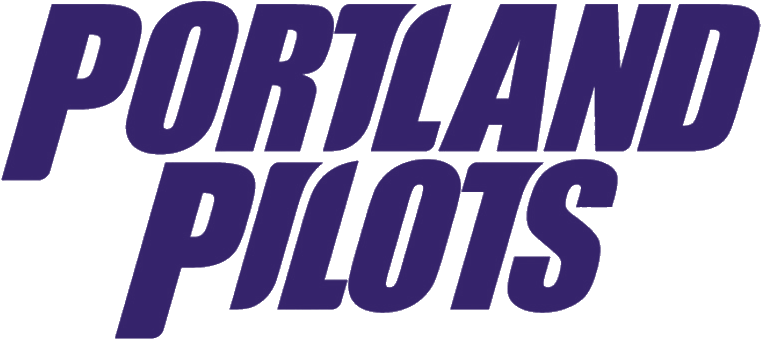

The Portland Pilots is the nickname for athletics at the University of Portland. The Pilots compete in the West Coast Conference (WCC) at the NCAA Division I level.

== History ==
Although the University of Portland (then known as Columbia University) started playing intercollegiate sports soon after its founding in 1901, it did not join the National Collegiate Athletic Association (NCAA) until September 1, 1952, and remained independent until it joined the West Coast Athletic Conference (now the West Coast Conference, or WCC) in Fall 1976.

The Pilots started to gain national attention when Clive Charles began coaching the women's soccer team in 1989. He already had been the men's soccer coach since 1986, and he continued to coach both teams until his death in 2003. He was replaced by Bill Irwin. The women's soccer team won national championships in 2002 and 2005 and was led by numerous national-level players (see "notable alumni athletes" section). Additionally, the men's soccer team has been to the College Cup twice in its history: 1988 and 1995.

In addition to soccer, UP consistently has one of the top cross country programs in the nation. Their men's team, coached by Rob Conner, won their 34th overall WCC championship in October 2014. The men's team has qualified for the NCAA Men's Division I Cross Country Championship a total of eighteen times, making their first appearance in 1993. The team has finished among the top 10 eight times in its history. The Pilots placed 7th in 2001, 2008, and 2013. The Pilots finished 3rd in 2014 and 2018 as well as 2nd in 2017, which was their highest ever finish. In 2008, David Kinsella finished 4th overall, the highest any Pilot has ever placed individually at the national championships. The men's team has won the NCAA West Regional four times in their history: in 1993, 2017, 2018, and 2019. Through 2017, a total of eighteen Pilots have earned All-American honors in cross country, including Scott Fauble, Alfred Kipchumba, Trevor Dunbar, Pete Julian, Uli Steidl, Joe Driscoll, Reid Buchanan, and John Moore. Rob Conner also heads the Pilots' Indoor and Outdoor Track & Field teams, and has coached 25 All-Americans in distance events ranging from the mile to the 10,000m run. Several Pilots have competed at the U.S. Olympic Trials under coach Conner, including William "Woody" Kincaid in the 5,000m in 2016, and John Moore and Michael Kilburg in the 10,000m in 2008.

The Pilots have had success in other sports. The men's basketball team has participated in the NCAA tournament twice (1959 and 1996). Their women's basketball team has participated in the NCAA Tournament six times (1994-1997, 2023, and 2024), qualified for the cancelled 2020 NCAA Tournament, and participated in the WNIT three times (1998, 2009, and 2022). Their baseball team has also participated in the NCAA tournament five times (1957, 1958, 1979, 1989, and 1991). Their volleyball team also participated in the postseason for the first time in 2018 after qualifying for the National Invitational Volleyball Championship.

UP has not fielded a football team since 1950.

== Sports sponsored ==
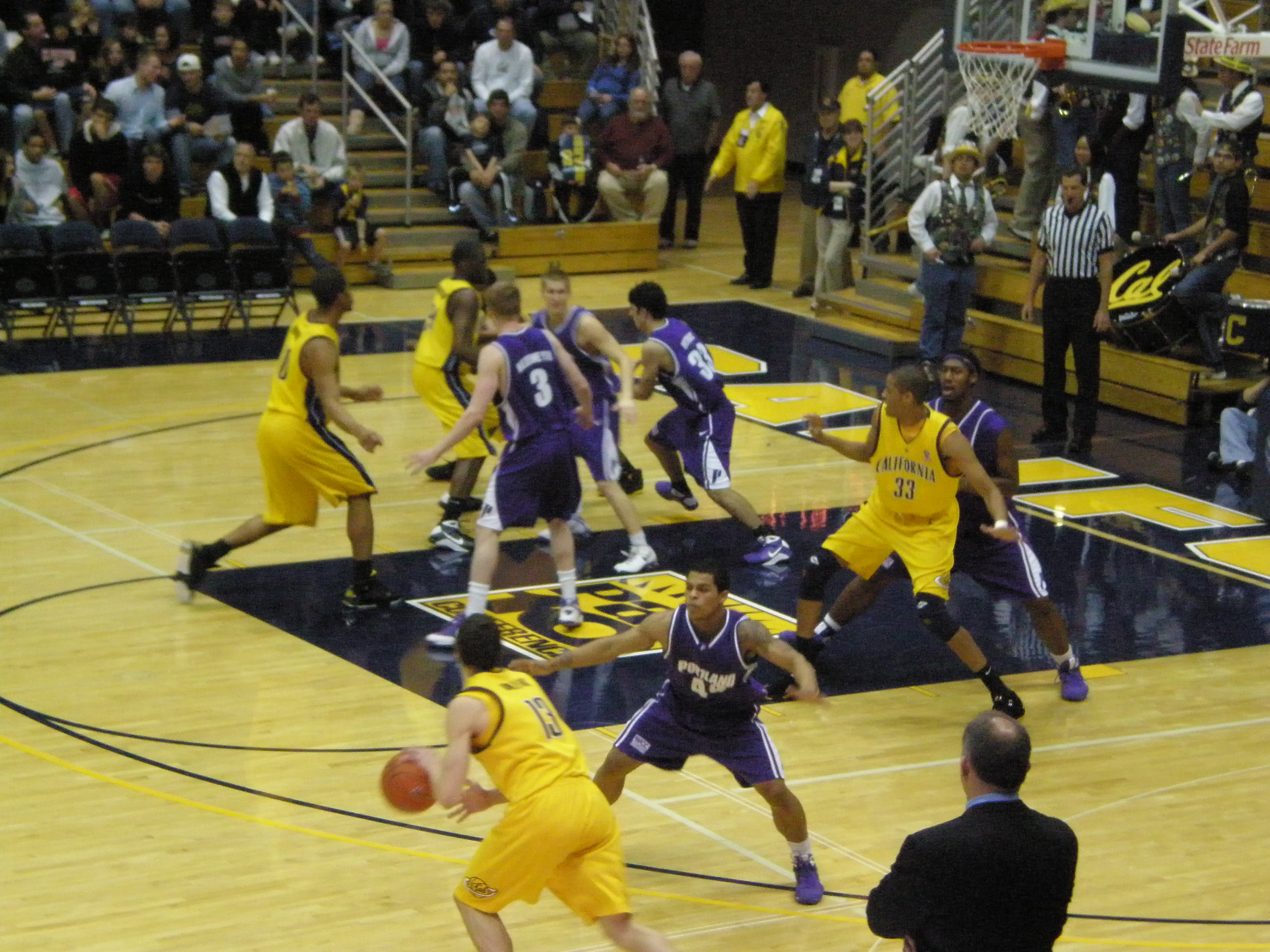
Portland men's basketball v Cal Golden Bears, 2008

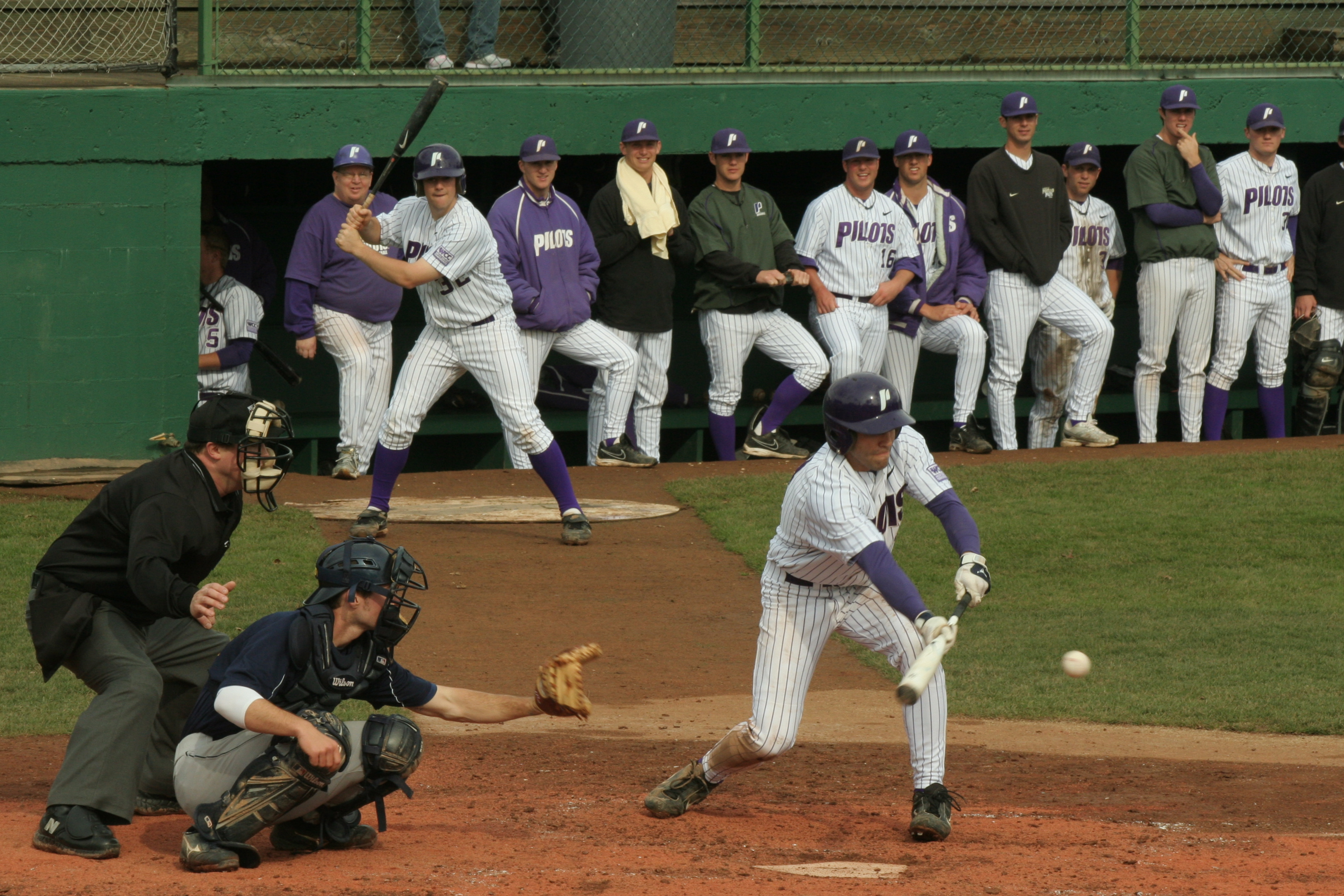
A Portland baseball game in 2009

Men's sports	Women's sports
Baseball	Basketball
Basketball	Beach volleyball
Cross country	Cross country
Soccer	Rowing
Tennis	Soccer
Track and field^{†}	Tennis
	Track and field^{†}
	Volleyball
† – Track and field includes both indoor and outdoor

=== Former teams ===
- Football (discontinued after 1950)
- Men's and women's golf (discontinued after 2011)

== National championships ==
NCAA team championships

- Women's soccer (2): 2002, 2005

Other team championships

- NAIA Women's Cross Country (1): 1985

== Conference championships ==
The Pilots compete in the West Coast Conference, which they joined in 1976. Below are a few of their conference titles:

- Men's Basketball WCC Tournament Champions (1): 1996
- Men's Baseball Pacific-10 Conference Northern Division Tournament (2): 1989, 1991
- Men's Cross Country (35): 2024, 2014, 2012, 2010, 2009, 2008, 2007, 2006, 2005, 2004, 2003, 2002, 2001, 2000, 1999, 1998, 1997, 1996, 1995, 1994, 1993, 1992, 1991, 1990, 1989, 1988, 1987, 1986, 1985, 1984, 1983, 1982, 1981, 1980, 1979
- Men's Golf (2): 1993, 1985
- Men's Soccer (6): 2016, 2002, 1992, 1990, 1989, 1988
- Men's Tennis Regular Season (1): 2017
- Women's Basketball WCC Tournament Champions (4): 2024, 2023, 2020, 1994; Regular Season Champions (4): 2025, 1997, 1996, 1992
- Women's Cross County (21): 2023, 2016, 2008, 2007, 2006, 2005, 2004, 2003, 2002, 2000, 1999, 1998, 1997, 1996, 1994, 1993, 1992, 1991, 1989, 1988, 1987
- Women's Soccer (13): 2013, 2010, 2009, 2008, 2007, 2005, 2004, 2000, 1997, 1996, 1995, 1994, 1992

== Venues ==
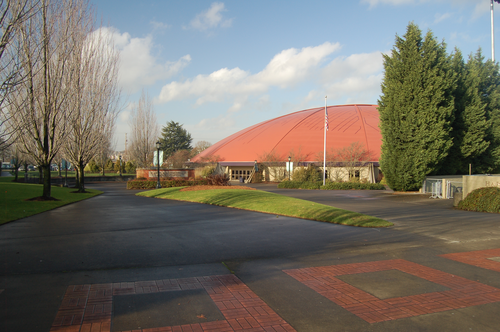
The Chiles Center, which is now painted white

The Portland Pilots play home soccer matches at Merlo Field, part of the Clive Charles Soccer Complex. All volleyball and basketball games are held in the Chiles Center. The baseball team plays in Joe Etzel Field. The Louisiana-Pacific Tennis Center is home to the tennis teams.

== Olympians ==
- Yari Allnutt, men's soccer, United States: 1996 Summer Olympics
- Conor Casey, men's soccer, United States: 2000 Summer Olympics
- Kasey Keller, men's soccer, United States: 1996 Summer Olympics
- Stephanie Lopez, women's soccer, United States: gold medalist in 2008 Summer Olympics
- Michelle French, women's soccer, United States: silver medalist in 2000 Summer Olympics
- Woody Kincaid, men's track and field, United States: 2020 Summer Olympics
- Shannon MacMillan, women's soccer, United States: gold medalist in 1996 Summer Olympics, silver medalist in 2000 Summer Olympics
- Derek Mandell, men's track and field, Guam: 2008 Summer Olympics, 2012 Summer Olympics
- Tiffeny Milbrett, women's soccer, United States: gold medalist in 1996 Summer Olympics, silver medalist in 2000 Summer Olympics
- Megan Rapinoe, women's soccer, United States: gold medalist in 2012 Summer Olympics, 2016 Summer Olympics, bronze medalist in 2020 Summer Olympics
- Sophie Schmidt, women's soccer, Canada: 2008 Summer Olympics, bronze medalist in 2012 Summer Olympics, bronze medalist in 2016 Summer Olympics, gold medalist in 2020 Summer Olympics
- Christine Sinclair, women's soccer, Canada: 2008 Summer Olympics, bronze medalist in 2012 Summer Olympics, bronze medalist in 2016 Summer Olympics, gold medalist in 2020 Summer Olympics
- Joshua Illustre, men’s track and field Guam: 2016 Summer Olympics

== Notable alumni athletes ==
- Yari Allnutt, US men's international soccer player
- Emmett Barrett, American football player
- Larry Beil, American football player
- Conor Casey, US men's international soccer player
- Pat Casey, head coach of the Oregon State baseball team
- Steve Cherundolo, soccer player and assistant manager for Hannover 96
- Alex Fowler, WNBA player for the New York Liberty
- Christina Francisco, runner who represents Guam internationally (current student)
- Rocky Gale, catcher in the San Diego Padres organization
- Nate Jaqua, soccer player who last played for Seattle Sounders FC
- Pooh Jeter, basketball player for the Sacramento Kings in 2010–11
- Kasey Keller, US men's international soccer player and TV analyst
- Woody Kincaid, US men's Olympic long distance runner
- Bill Krueger, former MLB player and TV analyst
- Stephanie Lopez, US women's international soccer player
- Shannon MacMillan, US women's international soccer player
- Karl McDade, NFL Center/Linebacker for the Pittsburgh Pirates (NFL) (1938)
- Benji Michel, soccer player for F.C. Arouca of the Portuguese Primera Liga and formerly of Orlando City SC
- Tiffeny Milbrett, US women's international soccer player
- Heath Pearce, US men's international soccer player
- Megan Rapinoe, US women's international soccer player
- Elli Reed, soccer player for Seattle Reign FC
- Luis Robles, US men's international soccer player and goalkeeper for New York Red Bulls
- Sophie Schmidt, Canadian international soccer player
- Ray Scott, former 1st round draft pick of the Detroit Pistons
- Christine Sinclair, Canadian international soccer player and all-time leader in international goals for either sex
- Garrett Smith, head coach of the women's soccer team
- Erik Spoelstra, head coach of the Miami Heat
- Keelin Winters, soccer player for Seattle Reign FC of the NWSL
