= Iona Gaels =

Intercollegiate sports teams of Iona College

Coordinates: 40.92583°N 73.7875°W

- University: Iona University
- NCAA: Division I
- Conference: Metro Atlantic Athletic Conference (primary); Collegiate Water Polo Association (men's water polo)
- Athletic director: Matthew Glovaski
- Location: New Rochelle, New York
- Varsity teams: 21
- Basketball arena: Hynes Center
- Baseball stadium: City Park
- Soccer stadium: Mazzella Field
- Nickname: Gaels
- Colors: Maroon and gold
- Mascot: Killian
- Fight song: Hail To Iona
- Website: ionagaels.com
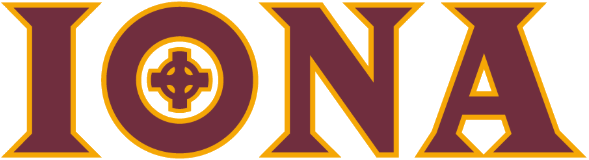

The Iona Gaels are the athletics teams of Iona University, in New Rochelle, New York. They compete in the Metro Atlantic Athletic Conference (MAAC) and participate in 21 NCAA Division I programs.

== Varsity athletic programs ==
Men's sports	Women's sports
Baseball	Basketball
Basketball	Cross country
Cross country	Lacrosse
Golf	Rowing
Lacrosse	Soccer
Rowing	Softball
Soccer	Swimming and diving
Swimming and diving	Track and field^{1}
Track and field^{1}	Volleyball
Water polo	Water polo
^{1} – indoor only

=== Men's basketball ===
Iona University has been competing in men's basketball since the inception of the school in 1940. Iona is an original member of the Metro Atlantic Athletic Conference, which began play in men's basketball with the 1981–82 season. The Gaels have compiled the most victories of any MAAC team since the founding of the conference and have won a league record seven MAAC titles. During their history, the Gaels have participated in 15 NCAA Men's Division I Basketball Championships compiling a record of 1–15. The lone win for the Gaels came in 1980 against Holy Cross, 84–78, which was later vacated due to NCAA violations. The Gaels were the 2011 CollegeInsider.com Tournament runners up.

Victories against ranked opponents:

- February 21, 1980: Iona 77, Louisville 60 (Madison Square Garden)
- December 27, 2002: Iona 65, North Carolina 56 (Madison Square Garden)
- November 26, 2005: Iona 89, Iowa State 72 (Ames, Iowa)
- November 25, 2021: Iona 72, Alabama 68 (Lake Buena Vista, Florida)

Notable Men's Basketball Coaches at Iona:

- Jim McDermott
- Jim Valvano
- Pat Kennedy
- Tim Welsh
- Jeff Ruland
- Kevin Willard
- Tim Cluess
- Rick Pitino

On April 9, 2010, Tim Cluess was named the 12th head coach in the history of Iona men's basketball. Cluess is a graduate of Hofstra University and formerly the head coach of the C.W. Post men's basketball team. He has won 20 games and a postseason berth in each of his first eight seasons as the head coach of Iona, the only coach in the history of the program to accomplish the feat. As of January 30, 2019, Cluess is No. 2 on Iona's all-time wins list.

Gaels who have played in the NBA:

- Richie Guerin
- Jeff Ruland
- Steve Burtt, Sr.
- Sean Green
- Scott Machado

Steve Burtt Sr. is Iona's all-time leading scorer with 2,534 career points.

=== Women's basketball ===
The Gaels have been competing in NCAA women's basketball since the 1974–75 season. They are a founding member of the MAAC and are coached by Billi Godsey, a graduate of Hofstra University. Godsey was named head coach for the 2013–14 season. In her first season, the Gaels earned their first ever MAAC Regular Season Championship. The program has five postseason appearances, the 2007, 2008, 2010 and 2014 Women's National Invitation Tournaments, and an appearance in the NCAA Division I women's basketball tournament in 2016. They hold a 2–5 record in postseason play.

=== Cross country, track and field ===
Iona men's cross country is one of the top programs in NCAA Division I having earned 15 top 10 finishes at the NCAA Championship in the past 19 years from 2002–present. The Gaels finished as the runner up at consecutive championships in 2007 and 2008. The program finished third overall in 2006, and fourth overall in 2003 and 2005. The Gaels have finished in the top three at the NCAA Northeast Regional Championship in 24 of the last 26 years dating back to 1997, including titles in 1999, 2002, 2003, 2005, 2006, 2007, 2008, 2012, and 2023. The program has also captured 33 straight Metro Atlantic Athletic Conference titles, the longest active streak in NCAA. Leonard Korir became the Gaels' first NCAA Championship winner when he won the 2011 NCAA Indoor 5000m title. Later that year he won the NCAA Outdoor 10000m championship.

The women's cross country program also claimed their first NCAA Northeast Regional Title in the 2014 season, qualifying for their second NCAA National Appearance, the first being in 2006. Iona earned its first individual Cross Country title in 2014 when Kate Avery won the NCAA National title, becoming only the second National Champion in Iona history and the first Female student-athlete from Iona to claim an NCAA title.

At the 2016 Summer Olympics in Rio de Janeiro, the program gained its first Olympians. The Gaels had three representatives in Track and Field. Leonard Korir competed in the 10,000m for the United States where he finished 14th in a time of 27:35.65. The Women's program had two alumni compete at the games. Maya Rehberg represented Germany in the 3000m Steeplechase where she finished 15th in the third heat. Her time of 9:51.73 ranked Rehberg 44th overall. Anna Baumeister competed for Denmark in the Women's Marathon. Baumeister finished in a time of 2:29.49 which earned her 55th place.

Joseph Pienta is the current head coach of both the men's and women's cross country and track and field programs. Pienta took over the head coaching position in 2018 after being an assistant coach for just under a decade. Ricardo Santos is the previous head coach of both the men's and women's programs. Santos is a graduate of Iona and received All-American Honors for cross-country in 1998 whilst representing the Gaels. Santos had been head coach of the cross country and track and field programs since 2008 before leaving the Gaels to coach the performance team at BAA (Boston Athletic Association). Santos is now on the coaching staff for men's cross country and track and field for the Stanford Cardinals.

Iona hosts their Meet of Champions cross country invitational annually at the start of each cross country season. Their home course is the cross country trails at Van Cortlandt Park, in the Bronx, New York.

=== Discontinued sports ===
==== Football ====
Iona's football program ran from 1965 to 2008. The program was ended in part due to the dissolution of the MAAC Football League in 2007.

==== Ice Hockey ====
The Iona Gaels Ice Hockey program began as an NCAA Division III program in 1967 under coach Harry Nixon, under whom they enjoyed their first season unbeaten. Playing as an Independent program since the program's conception, the Gaels joined the Division III tier of the ECAC Ice Hockey Conference in 1977, before the MAAC introduced Ice Hockey as a sport within the conference in 1998. Their best finish in the MAAC tournament came in the 2000 season, where they placed second.

The program ran until the end of the 2002–03 NCAA Ice Hockey season, after the board of trustees decided to remove the program from the Gaels' varsity sports teams.

== Facilities ==
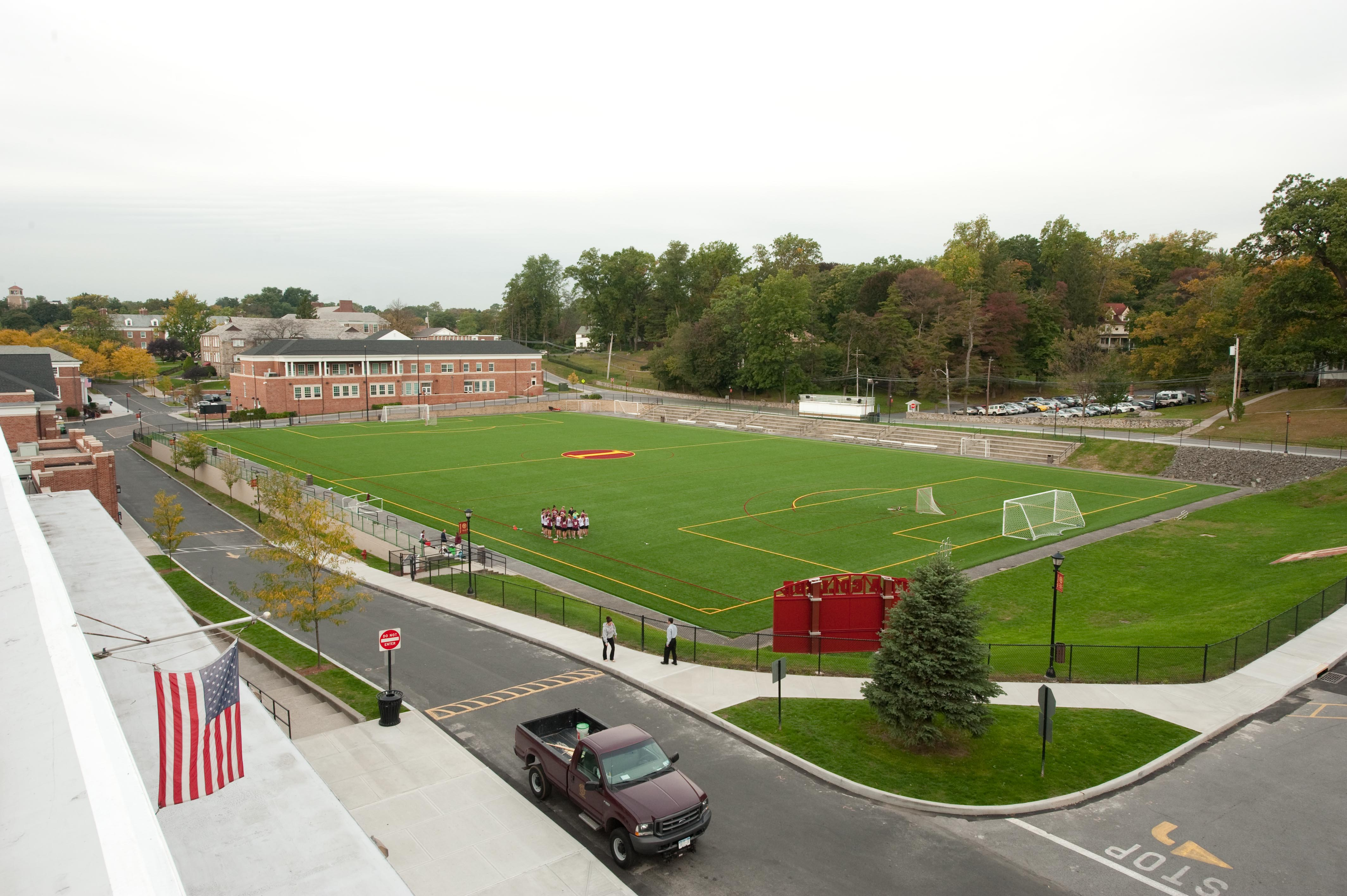
Mazzella Field

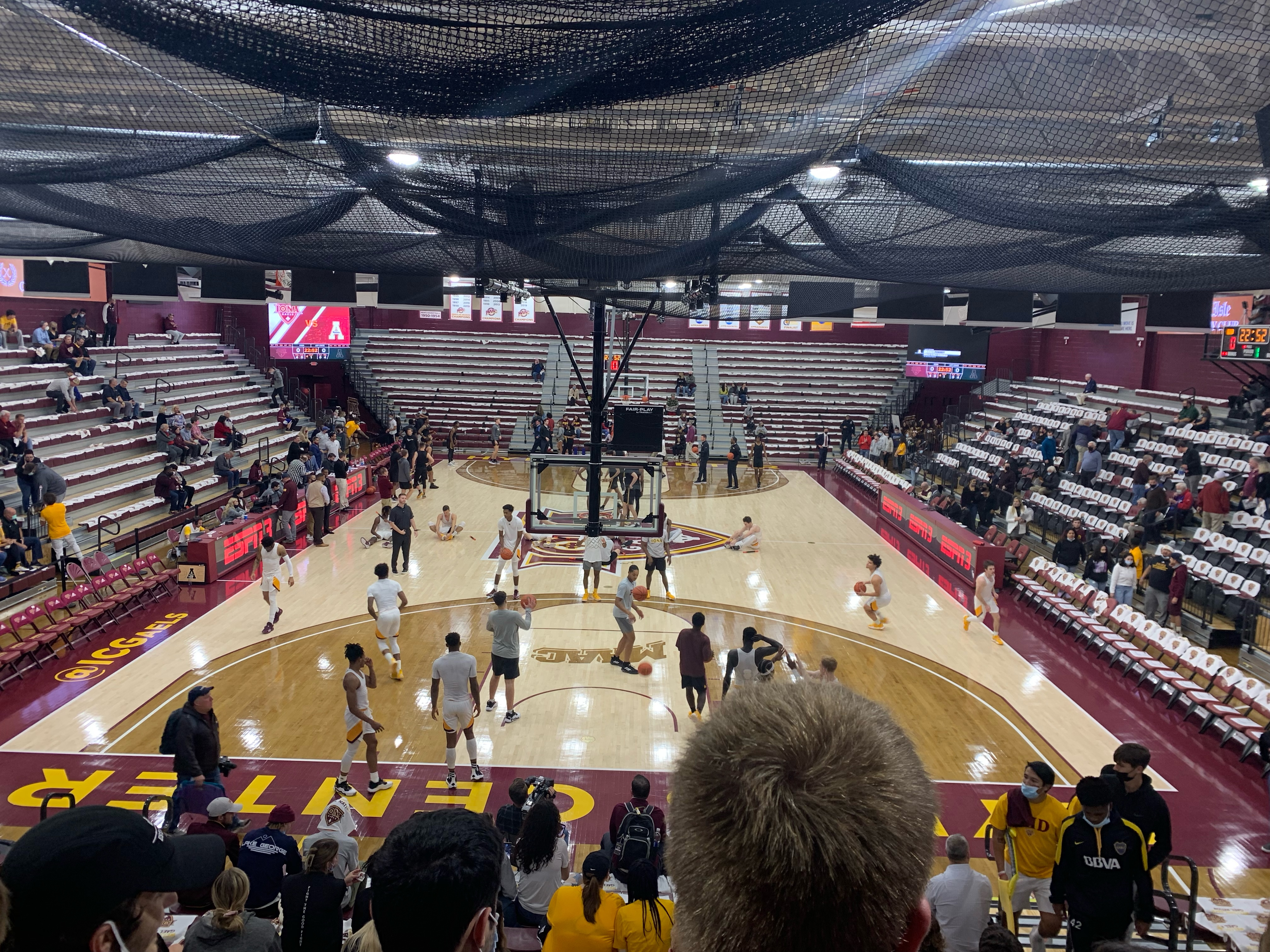
Hynes Athletic Center

Venue	Sport	Opened
Hynes Athletic Center	Basketball	1974
Hynes Athletic Center	Swimming	1974
Hynes Athletic Center	Water polo	1974
Hynes Athletic Center	Volleyball	1974
Mazzella Field	Soccer	1989
Mazzella Field	Lacrosse	1989
Mazzella Field	Rugby	1989
Rice Oval	Softball	n/a

Notes

- Baseball teams play at City Park.
- Cross country teams train at Van Cortlandt Park, a public park in The Bronx.
- Rowing teams train at Glen Island Park.

== Rivalries ==
Iona's rivals include the following:

- Syracuse University
- Manhattan College
- Fordham University
- Siena College
- Marist College
- Saint Peter's University
