= William & Mary Tribe =

College sports teams in Virginia, US

- University: College of William & Mary
- Nickname: Tribe
- NCAA: Division I (FCS)
- Conference: CAA (primary); Patriot League (football); ECAC (men's gymnastics); GEC (women's gymnastics)
- Athletic director: Brian Mann
- Location: Williamsburg, Virginia
- Varsity teams: 21 (10 men's, 11 women's)
- Football stadium: Zable Stadium
- Basketball arena: Kaplan Arena
- Baseball stadium: Plumeri Park
- Soccer stadium: Albert–Daly Field
- Lacrosse stadium: Albert–Daly Field
- Tennis venue: McCormack-Nagelsen Tennis Center
- Volleyball arena: Kaplan Arena
- Colors
- Mascot: Griffin "Reveley"
- Fight song: Tribe Fight Song
- Website: tribeathletics.com

The William & Mary Tribe is a moniker for the College of William & Mary's athletic teams and the university's community more broadly.

William & Mary has won two team national championships (both in men's tennis), the AIAW championships in women's golf, the NAIA championships in women's gymnastics, thirteen USA Gymnastics Collegiate Championships, and various individual national championships. The College has more conference championships than any other school in the Coastal Athletic Association. As of the end of the 2010–11 academic year, the Tribe had won 101 conference championships. Dating back to the athletic program's beginning, there have been about 160 conference titles in all.

William & Mary is the second-oldest university in the United States. Since the founding of its athletic program in 1893 the school's athletes have worn different colors and nicknames. From 1893 to 1909 William & Mary football players were known simply as the Orange and White; this reflected the official school colors at that time. From 1910 to 1916 the team colors changed, and the new nickname, "The Orange and Black", reflected this. From 1916 to the mid-1980s William & Mary athletic teams were known as the Indians. Since 1978 the school's teams have been known simply as the Tribe. During the 2006–07 school year then–College President Gene Nichol removed two tribal feathers from the William & Mary athletic logo to bring the program into compliance with newly passed NCAA regulations. On April 6, 2010, after student discussion and subsequent polling, the griffin was announced as the school's new mascot.

In 1995 William & Mary discontinued the sport of wrestling. In September 2020, William & Mary announced it would discontinue seven sports – men's indoor and outdoor track and field, men's and women's swimming, men's and women's gymnastics, and women's volleyball – at the conclusion of the 2020–21 academic year. After a considerable amount of backlash and controversy, Samantha Huge resigned as athletic director on October 6, 2020. Jeremy Martin was named interim athletic director. Brian Mann is the current athletic director.

The three women's sports that had been cut were completely reinstated on October 19, 2020. Then on November 5, 2020, the four men's sports that had been cut were reinstated through the 2021–22 school year.

== Sports sponsored ==
Men's sports	Women's sports
Baseball	Basketball
Basketball	Cross country
Cross country	Field hockey
Football	Golf
Golf	Gymnastics
Gymnastics	Lacrosse
Soccer	Soccer
Swimming	Swimming
Tennis	Tennis
Track and field^{†}	Track and field^{†}
	Volleyball
† – Track and field includes both indoor and outdoor.

=== Baseball ===
In the 1960s Joe Plumeri, future Chairman & CEO of Willis Group Holdings and owner of the Trenton Thunder, who later donated $2 million to build the team's Plumeri Park, played on the baseball team as a second baseman and outfielder. Plumeri also funded the Joseph J. Plumeri Endowment Fund for baseball scholarships for the school. The baseball team has qualified for the NCAA Division I Baseball Championship in 1983, 2001, 2013 and 2016, with the most recent appearance including an upset of the Tribe's rival (and defending College World Series champion) Virginia Cavaliers.

=== Football ===
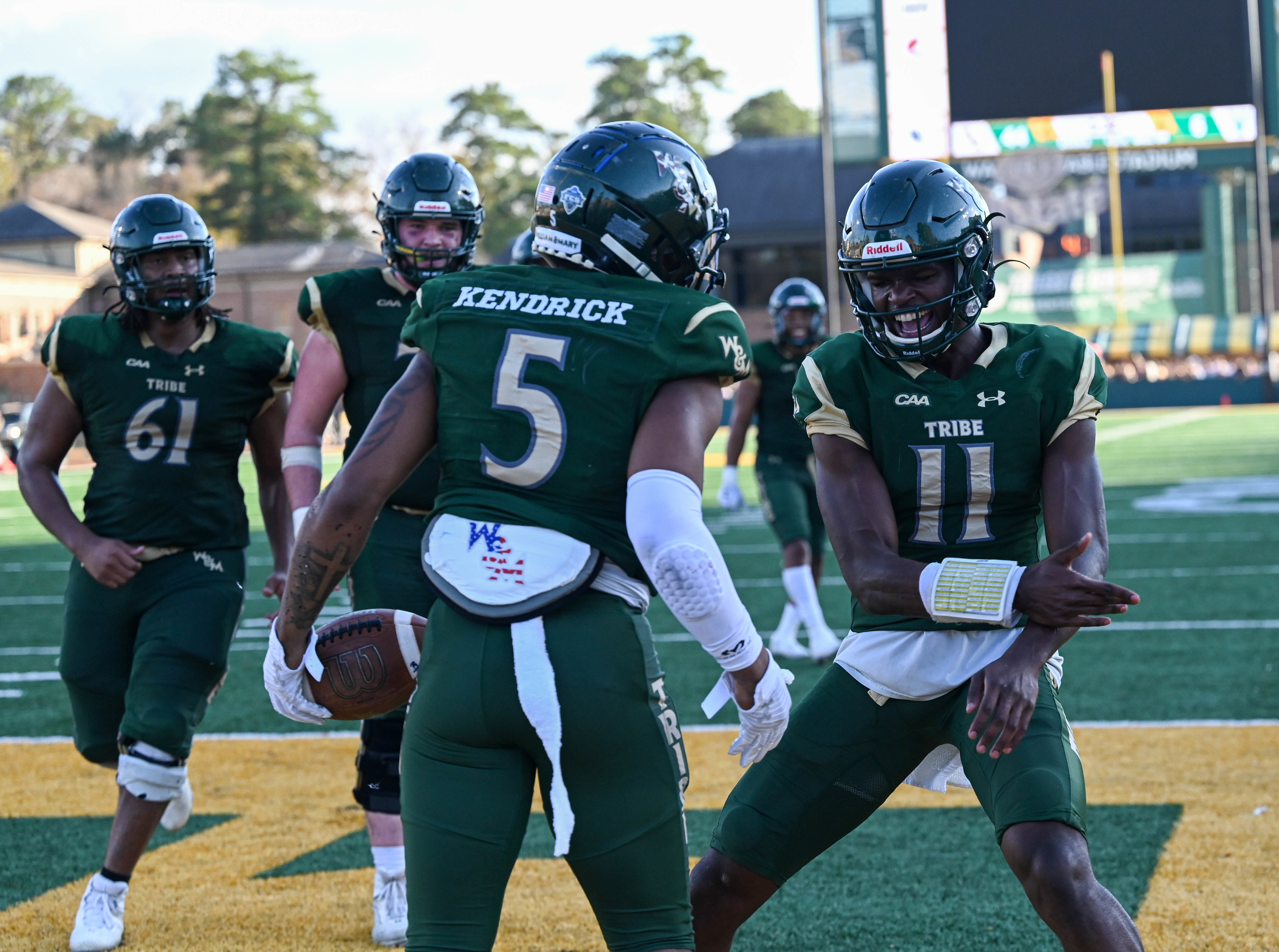
Tribe football players celebrate a touchdown during a game at Zable Stadium in 2022

The football team has won eight conference championships. While a member of the Southern Conference, W&M were champions or co-champions in 1942, 1947, 1966, and 1970. The William & Mary scandal of 1951, which involved improper alteration of athletic recruit transcripts, brought disfavorable national attention and effectively resulted in the College downgrading football going forward as the faculty revolted and it was not invited to join the Atlantic Coast Conference when that league was established in 1953.

In the 1960s, future Willis Group Holdings Chairman & CEO Joe Plumeri played on the football team on scholarship as a halfback for Lou Holtz. After joining the Yankee Conference, the Tribe won the Mid-Atlantic Division in 1993 and won the conference championship in 1996. After the Yankee Conference's 1997 merger with the A-10 Conference, the Tribe were co-champions in 2001 and 2004. After the Colonial Athletic Association began sponsoring football with the 2007 season, the Tribe were co-champions in 2010 and in 2015.

The 2004 season saw William & Mary reach the Division I-AA national semi-finals before finally falling to rival James Madison University.

In 2008, the Tribe played Richmond, at home, on the very last game of the season. While Richmond was assured of a berth in the playoffs, having played and won an extra game due to a 12-game schedule that year (Tribe only played 11 games), the Tribe entered the game needing a win to secure a playoff spot. William & Mary trailed by 14 points going into the 4th quarter but made a huge comeback (largely due to Derek Cox) to send the game into overtime. The Tribe lost in overtime after Richmond blocked a field goal attempt during the Tribe's possession, then kicked a successful field goal during its possession. By failing to beat the Spiders William & Mary missed the playoffs. Richmond, however, would go on to win the NCAA Division I Football Championship by defeating Eastern Kentucky, Appalachian State, Northern Iowa, and the University of Montana 24–7 in the national championship game in Chattanooga, Tennessee.

In 2009, the Tribe played the Virginia Cavaliers (UVa), in a season opening match-up for both schools in Charlottesville for the first time since 1986. The Tribe upset Virginia 26–14. It was the second Tribe win over Virginia in as many tries and mirrored several other recent wins by CAA (FCS) programs over those in the ACC (FBS), including three by Richmond over Duke (2006, 2009, 2011). The Tribe finished the year 11–3, after a run to the national semifinals that ended with a 14–13 loss to CAA rival and eventual champion Villanova.

=== Basketball ===
==== Men ====
Traditionally, the Tribe has not been a storied basketball program, though they have achieved sporadic success. They have reached the postseason three times, all in the National Invitation Tournament. They first made the NIT in 1983 after winning the regular season conference title. They then returned to the NIT in 2010 after beating both Wake Forest University and the University of Maryland on the road during the regular season. The Tribe qualified for the 2015 National Invitation Tournament after winning their first ever CAA regular season title and losing in the CAA Tournament.

The Tribe have appeared in the championship game of a conference tournament nine times but have lost them all. While in the Southern Conference, they lost the tournament final in 1958, 1961, 1965, and 1975, and while in the ECAC South (precursor to the Coastal Athletic Association) they lost the 1983 final to James Madison, 38–41. They next competed in the CAA tournament final in 2008, losing 59–68 to George Mason. They then reached the CAA Final three more times in the next couple of years and lost each time, losing in 2010 (53–60) to Old Dominion, 2014 (74–75) to Delaware, and 2015 (61–72) to Northeastern.

==== Women ====
The Tribe women's basketball team has generally not been a successful program. They first reached a conference tournament final appearance in the 1993 CAA final, which they lost to perennial power Old Dominion by a score of 51–65. The 2014–15 season was their most successful in many years and resulted in a bid to the 2015 Women's Basketball Invitational.

After going 11-18 overall and 8-10 in conference play, the 2024–25 team was seeded ninth in the 2025 CAA women's basketball tournament, but ultimately upset top-seed North Carolina A&T and fourth-seeded Drexel to reach their first CAA final in 32 years. The Tribe then defeated third-seeded Campbell 66–63 on March 16 for the first ever CAA basketball tournament championship in school history, thereby qualifying for their first NCAA tournament, and marking the first NCAA tournament appearance in school history for either of the men's or women's basketball teams. On March 20, they subsequently defeated High Point, 69–63, in the First Four round of the NCAA tournament, advancing to the main field of 64, before losing their first round matchup to #1 seed Texas, 105–61.

=== Cross country, track & field ===
The College of William & Mary's most dominant sports are its men's and women's cross country and track & field teams. The cross country teams previously hosted their home meets on the grounds of the Eastern State Hospital. Home track meets are held at Zable Stadium. The totals below are current as of the end of the 2014–15 season.

==== Men ====
The men's cross country team qualified for fourteen straight NCAA Division I championships (1997–2010), and 26 total NCAA championship appearances. Alumnus Brian Hyde represented the United States in the 1996 Olympics. In November 2009, the Tribe placed fifth at the 2009 NCAA Division I cross country championships in Terre Haute, Indiana.

William & Mary hosted the NCAA cross country championships at Eastern State Hospital in 1970.

Conference titles:

- Cross country – 38 (23 CAA, 15 Southern)
- Track & field – 32 championships in 21 separate years (Note: The Southern Conference named separate champions for indoor and outdoor track and field during William and Mary's membership in that conference. In eleven years (1957 and 1966–1975) the Tribe won both the indoor and outdoor championships; in one additional year (1958) they won the outdoor championship only.)

NCAA appearances:

- 1963 – 17th
- 1964 – 20th
- 1966 – 20th
- 1984 – 15th
- 1970 – 10th
- 1971 – 17th
- 1972 – 11th
- 1973 – 4th
- 1975 – 23rd
- 1990 – 15th
- 1994 – 18th
- 1995 – 17th
- 1997 – 9th
- 1998 – 13th
- 1999 – 13th
- 2000 – 10th
- 2001 – 16th
- 2002 – 14th
- 2003 – 31st
- 2004 – DNF
- 2005 – 22nd
- 2006 – 8th
- 2007 – 15th
- 2008 – 16th
- 2009 – 5th
- 2010 – 19th

NCAA individual championships:

- 1969-70: Hal Michael, indoor mile
- 1973-74: Reggie Clark, indoor 880 yards

==== Women ====
The women's cross country squad has made nine NCAA championship appearances. The Tribe's most recent appearance came in 2014, after winning their first-ever NCAA Regional title.

Conference titles:

- Cross Country – 21
- Track & Field – 11

NCAA appearances:

- 1990 – 20th (tie)
- 1992 – 16th
- 1996 – 17th
- 1998 – 10th
- 2002 – 23rd (tie)
- 2005 – 22nd
- 2012 – 21st
- 2013 – 12th
- 2014 – 17th

AIAW individual championships:

- 1982: Jeri Daniels, (outdoor) shot put

=== Soccer ===
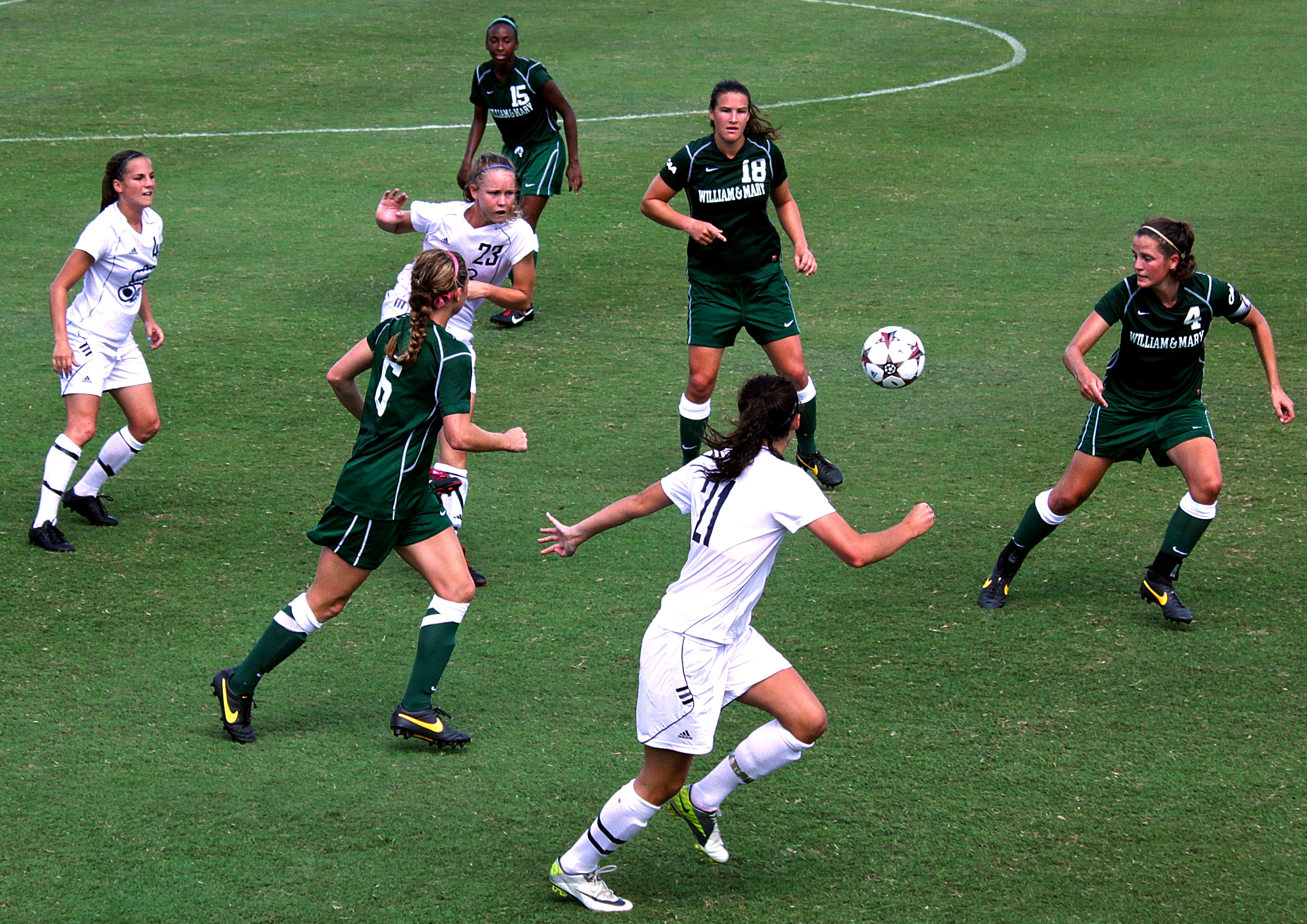
A women's soccer game between William & Mary and Old Dominion in 2013

==== Men ====
The Tribe men's soccer team has produced two First Team All-Americans and fourteen NCAA Tournament appearances, most recently in 2010. They have won eight conference tournaments since the program's inception in 1965. The most famous alumnus from this program is TV pundit Jon Stewart. He played from 1981 to 1983 and scored the lone goal in a 1–0 victory over UConn in the 1983 ECAC tournament championship to give William & Mary their second ever conference tournament championship crown. Stewart ended his career with 10 goals and 12 assists while playing as a midfielder and winger.

The majority of the Tribe's success in men's soccer was overseen by Al Albert during a 33-year career as head coach. In 2004, Albert passed the job to Chris Norris. Norris was a player and assistant coach at W&M for 13 years before becoming Albert's successor.

==== Women ====
When counting all-time women's soccer NCAA Tournament appearances, just behind national powerhouses North Carolina (with 30) and UConn (with 28) are the William & Mary Tribe (24). As of the end of 2011, they were on an NCAA-record 30-year consecutive winning seasons streak (tied with North Carolina), dating back to 1982, capturing ten conference tournament crowns in that span. Twice players were selected as the NSCAA National Player of the Year (1987, 1995), and three times the team has made it all the way to the Tournament's Elite 8 (1987, 1994, 1997).

=== Field hockey ===
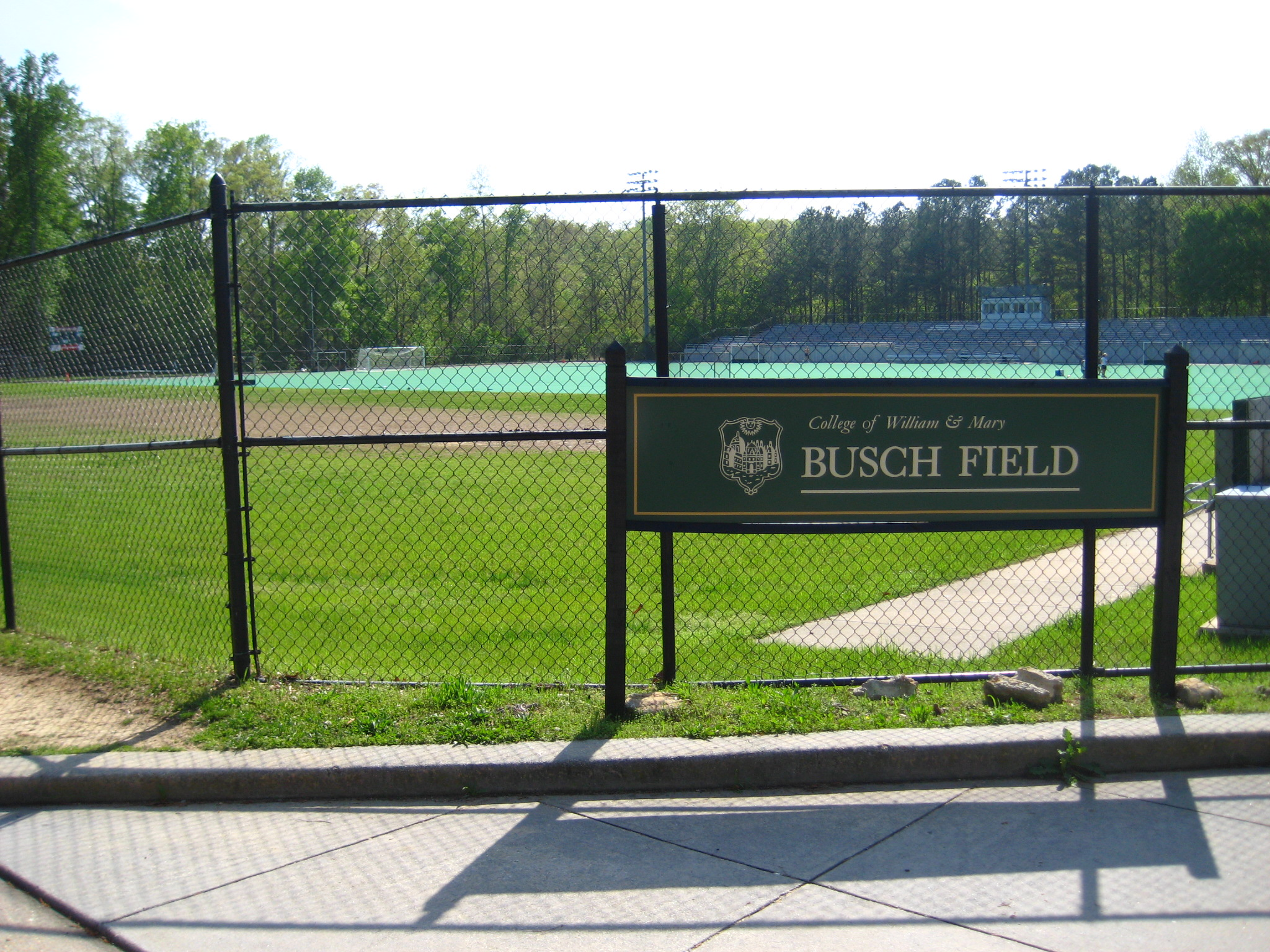
The women's lacrosse and field hockey teams play at Busch Field.

The field hockey team plays at Busch Field on campus. The team has two CAA championships (2018 and 2023). The Tribe has qualified for four AIAW and four NCAA tournaments, with a combined record of 8–7 and 2–4, respectively.

==== AIAW appearances ====
Year	Round	Opponent	Score
1975	First round Quarterfinals; Semifinals; Third place	Stanford; Lock Haven State; Ursinus; Springfield	W, 5–1; W, 2–1; L, 0–4; L, 0–3
1976	First round Quarterfinals; Consolation quarterfinals	Stanford; Lock Haven State; Bemidji State	W, 5–1; L, 0–2; L, 2–3
1979	First round Quarterfinals; Consolation quarterfinals Consolation semifinals Fifth place	Oregon; Penn State; Springfield; Saint Louis; Princeton	W, 2–0; L, 0–1; W, 4–0; W, 1–0; W, 1–0
1980	First round Consolation first round Consolation quarterfinals	New Hampshire; Ursinus; Long Beach State	L, 0–1; W, 3–0; L, 1–2

==== NCAA appearances ====
Year	Round	Opponent	Score
2000	First round	Michigan	L, 2–3 (OT)
2002	First round	Maryland	L, 1–2 (OT)
2018	Opening round First round	Monmouth #1 North Carolina	W, 3–2 (OT); L, 0-4
2023	Opening round First round	Sacred Heart; North Carolina	W, 4–0; L, 1–6

=== Gymnastics ===
The men's and women's gymnastics teams host their meets at Kaplan Arena.

==== Men ====
The men's team has been very successful across the years. While never winning a team national title, the team has achieved three individual championships: Scott McCall on the rings in 1996, Ramon Jackson on the parallel bars in 2004, and Luke Tully in the all-around in 2026. The team has appeared at eight NCAA championship events: 2002, 2003, 2005, 2006, 2008, 2014, 2021, and 2025. Tribe men's gymnastics has also won thirteen USA Gymnastics Collegiate Championships (1994, 1995, 1996, 1997, 1999, 2001, 2002, 2003, 2004, 2005, 2006, 2007, and 2009) and produced five CGCA National Academic Team Champions. The Tribe has a total of four ECAC gymnastics titles, 1992, 1994, 2006, and 2014.

Year	Results
2002	12th (of 12)
2003	12th (of 12)
2005	12th (of 12)
2006	11th (of 12)
2008	11th (of 12)
2014	12th (of 12)
2021	12th (of 12)
2025	12th (of 12)

==== Women ====
The women's team has never qualified for the national championship meet or won an individual event. Nonetheless, the women's team has still won six ECAC gymnastics championships: 1999, 2001, 2002, 2003, 2014 & 2015. They also won the NAIA gymnastics title in 1983.

=== Golf ===
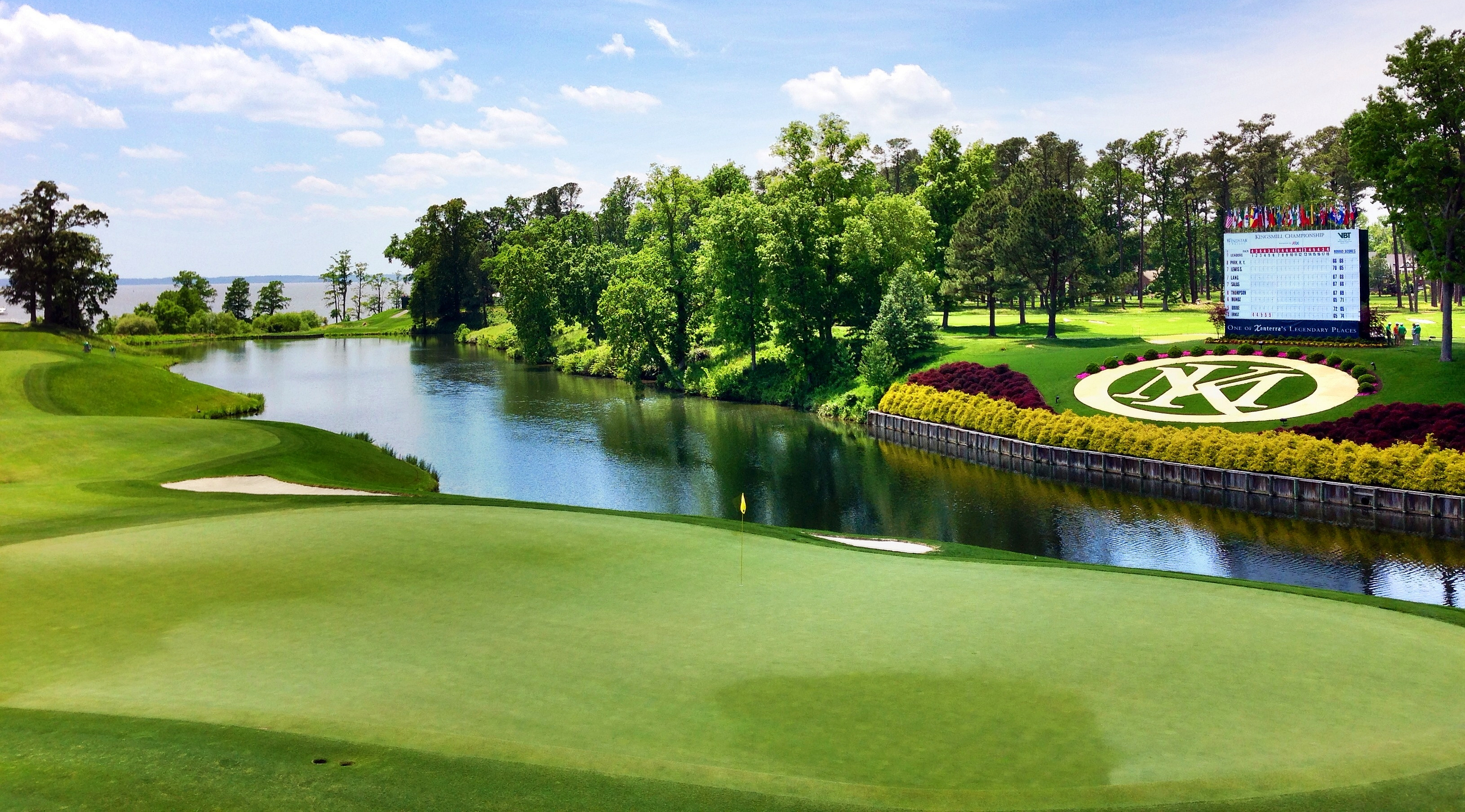
The golf teams host their tournaments at Kingsmill Resort.

The men's and golf team host their home tournaments at the Golden Horseshoe Golf Club and the women's golf team host their home tournaments at Kingsmill Resort. Neither the men nor women have ever qualified as a team for the NCAA golf championships. However, the women's team won an AIAW championship in 1981. In conference play, the men's team won their sole CAA championship in 1985. In 2026, Talon Dingledine finished as the CAA runner-up with a three-round total of 9-under par 207. The team played in the national postseason for the first time since 2002 at the Golfweek National Golf Invitational.

=== Lacrosse ===
The women's lacrosse team plays at Martin Family Stadium at Albert-Daly Field. They have qualified for seven NCAA tournaments and have a combined record of 0–7. They also have one CAA title, from 1992.

==== NCAA performances ====
Year	Round	Opponents	Results/scores
1983	First round	Delaware	L, 7–11
1988	First round	Harvard	L, 6–7
1994	First round	Virginia	L, 4–8
1996	First round	Virginia	L, 6–8
1997	First round	Loyola (MD)	L, 2–11
1998	First round	James Madison	L, 9–15
2001	First round	Loyola (MD)	L, 7–15

=== Swimming and diving ===
The men's and women's teams compete at the Bee McLeod Student Recreation Center. Previously, they swam at the Adair Gymnasium.

==== Men ====
The men's teams has competed at several NCAA championships, 1938, 1963, 1985 and 1986, but has not yet won a team or individual national championship. The team has won six consecutive CAA championships: 2015, 2016, 2017, 2018, 2019, and 2020.

NCAA qualifiers

Year	Athlete	Event	Results
1938	Leonard Goldburg '39	200 breast	
1938	Johnny Adams '39	Diving	
1963	Ron Good '65	50 & 100 freestyle	
1985	Shawn McLane '86	Diving	32nd (of 36)
1986	Shawn McLane '86	Diving	41st (of 43)
2020	Colin Wright '20	50 & 100 freestyle	N/A-meet cancelled

Diver Shawn McLane was named an All-American in 1985 (1- and 3-meter) and 1986 (3-meter). Swimmer Colin Wright was named an All-American in 2020, having been seeded fourth in the 50 yard freestyle and eighth in the 100 yard freestyle at the 2020 NCAA championships that were cancelled due to the COVID-19 pandemic. Wright also earned a 12th place finish at the 2019 Phillips 66 National Championships in the 50 LCM freestyle.

The men won every CAA Championship meet relay for the three straight years from 2018 to 2020, and won all five of them with conference records in 2020. As of 2020, they also held nine of the 13 individual CAA Records.

The team had six qualifying times for the 2021 Olympic Trial qualifier meet: Jack Doherty-50 freestyle & 100 butterfly, Ben Skopic-200 individual medley, Ian Thompson-50 freestyle, and Colin Wright-50 & 100 freestyle. Aiden Bond qualified for the 2024 Olympic Trials in the 50 freestyle.

==== Women ====
The women's team has been represented at the NCAA Championship meet on five occasions. Erin Sheehey competed at the meet in 1984 and Katie Radloff qualified and competed all four years of her college career from 2007 to 2010, finishing as high as 20th in the nation in the 100 yard freestyle. The women have also won five CAA championships: 2007, 2016, 2017, 2022, and 2026.

NCAA Championship Appearances
Year	Athlete	Event	Results
1984	Erin Sheehey Downs '84	50 breast	
2007	Katie Radloff '10	50, 100 & 200 free	
2008	Katie Radloff '10	50, 100 & 200 free	20th in 100 free
2009	Katie Radloff '10	50, 100 & 200 free	
2010	Katie Radloff '10	50, 100 & 200 free	

Missy Cundiff '22 had a qualifying time in the 50 freestyle and attended the 2021 Olympic qualifier meet.

=== Tennis ===
The men's and women's tennis teams play at the Millie West Tennis Facility and the McCormack–Nagelsen Tennis Center. Both teams have won numerous CAA tennis championships.

==== Men ====
The men's team won two NCAA championships in 1947 (10–4 vs. Rice) and 1948 (6–5 vs. San Francisco); they were led by coach Sharvey G. Umbeck to both titles. They were runners up in 1946 against USC. Individually, players have won two individual events: Gardner Larned won the singles title in 1947 and the pair of Fred Kovaleski and Bernard Bartzen won the doubles title in 1948. Since then, Tribe men's tennis has made four national championship appearances (with a record of 0–3): 1999, 2005, 2007, and 2015. Additionally, the men have won four CAA tennis championships: 1988, 1990, 2005, and 2015.

===== NCAA performances =====
Year	Round	Opponent	Results/scores
1999	First round	Clemson	L, 3–4
2005	First round	TAMU–Corpus Christi	L, 2–4
2007	First round	NC State	L, 0–4
2015	First round	North Carolina	L, 0–4

==== Women ====
The women's team, while never winning an NCAA title, has also been prolific. The team has made 26 appearances in the NCAA championships with a combined record of 21–26: 1989, 1990, 1991, 1992, 1995, 1996, 1997, 1998, 1999, 2000, 2002, 2003, 2004, 2005, 2006, 2007, 2008, 2011, 2013, 2016, and 2017, 2018, 2022, 2023, and 2024. Furthermore, the women's team has won 29 conference titles: 1986, 1987, 1988, 1989, 1990, 1991, 1992, 1993, 1994, 1995, 1996, 1997, 1998, 1999, 2000, 2002, 2004, 2005, 2007, 2008, 2011, 2013, 2015, 2016, 2017, 2018, 2022, 2023, and 2024.

===== NCAA performances =====
Year	Round	Opponent	Results/scores
1989	First round	San Diego State	L, 3–6
1990	First round	South Carolina	L, 0–6
1991	First round	Miami (FL)	L, 3–6
1992	First round Second round	Miami (FL); Texas	W, 5–4; L, 3–5
1995	Second round	California	L, 2–5
1996	East Regional; East Regional; East Regional; First round	Seton Hall; Virginia; California; Texas	W, 5–4; W, 5–4; W, 5–4; L, 3–5
1997	East Regional; East Regional; East Regional; First round Quarterfinals	Richmond; Brown; Harvard; Georgia; Stanford	W, 5–0; W, 5–0; W, 5–3; W, 5–0; L, 0–6
1998	East Regional; East Regional; East Regional; First round Quarterfinals	Richmond; Virginia Tech; VCU; California; Georgia	W, 5–1; W, 5–1; W, 5–3; W, 5–3; L, 2–5
1999	Regional semifinals Regional final	UMBC; Fresno State	W, 6–0; L, 3–5
2000	Round of 64; Round of 32	Loyola (MD); Tennessee	W, 5–0; L, 3–5
2002	Round of 64	Clemson	L, 3–4
2003	Round of 64; Round of 32; Round of 16	Temple; South Alabama; Duke	W, 4–0; W, 4–1; L, 0–5
2004	Round of 64; Round of 32	Illinois; Duke	W, 4–2; L, 0–4
2005	Round of 64; Round of 32	Wisconsin; Clemson	W, 4–1; L, 0–4
2006	Round of 64	NC State	L, 3–4
2007	Round of 64; Round of 32; Round of 16	Richmond; Wake Forest; Georgia	W, 4–0; W, 4–1; L, 1–4
2008	Round of 64; Round of 32	NC State; Duke	W, 4–0; L, 1–4
2011	Round of 64	Yale	L, 2–4
2013	Round of 64	Texas	L, 4-0
2015	Round of 64	Dartmouth	L, 1-4
2016	Round of 64	Texas	L, 2-4
2017	Round of 64	Ole Miss	L, 1-4
2018	Round of 64	Mississippi St.	L, 2-4
2022	Round of 64	NC State	L, 0-4
2023	Round of 64	Duke	L, 0-4
2024	Round of 64	Wisconsin	L, 0-4

=== Volleyball ===
The women's volleyball team competes at Kaplan Arena. They have won eight CAA championships (1985, 1986, 1987, 1988, 1989, 1990, 1991, and 2001) and made one appearance in the NCAA tournament in 2001 losing in the first round to Duke University.

==== NCAA Tournament performances ====
Year	Round	Opponent	Results/scores
2001	First round	Duke	L, 0–3

== National championships ==
=== Team ===
William & Mary has won two NCAA national team championships, both for men's tennis; the Tribe won back-to-back national championships in 1947 and 1948. During the era when the AIAW conducted women's collegiate championships, the Tribe women claimed one AIAW national team title, for golf (Division II) in 1981.

Association	Division	Sport	Year	Opponent/ runner-up	Score
NCAA	University Division	Men's Tennis (2)	1947	Rice	10–4 (+6)
NCAA	University Division	Men's Tennis (2)	1948	San Francisco	6–5 (+1)

== Notable alumni ==
Main article: List of College of William & Mary alumni

Notable graduates from the athletic programs include Jon Stewart, Adin Brown, Sean McDermott, Mike Leach, Buster Ramsey, Darren Sharper, Mike Tomlin, Bill Chambers, J. D. Gibbs, Steve Christie, Wade Barrett, Jill Ellis, and Derek Cox.

== Fight songs ==
The "Tribe Fight Song" is the official fight song of The College of William & Mary, located in Williamsburg, Virginia. Throughout the College's history there have been three official fight songs. The original fight song, titled "Victory", was written in 1929 by Oscar E. Wilkinson. Two years later, a new fight song titled "Fight, Fight, Fight for the Indians" (Note: William & Mary used to be known as the Indians prior to their moniker change to the Tribe.) was published in the William & Mary student handbook. Many years later, a third edition was written which is still used today. Simply "Tribe Fight Song", it is supposed to be played after every touchdown the Tribe football team scores at home games. In addition, the tune played at the end of home winning soccer, volleyball, basketball, and lacrosse games.

== Radio affiliates ==
Two radio stations in eastern Virginia broadcast Tribe football and men's basketball, under the branding "William & Mary Tribe Radio Network".

City	Call sign	Frequency
Deltaville, Virginia	WTYD-FM	92.3 FM
West Point, Virginia	WBQK-FM	107.9 FM

== See also ==
- List of NCAA college football rivalry games
