= Tennessee Lady Volunteers cross country =

- Founded: 1974
- University: University of Tennessee
- Athletic director: Danny White
- Head coach: Sean Carlson (3rd season)
- Conference: SEC
- Location: Knoxville, TN
- Course: Cherokee Farm Cross Country Course
- Nickname: Lady Volunteers
- Colors: Orange and white

NCAA Championship appearances
- 1977*, 1979*, 1980*, 1982, 1983, 1989, 1990, 1998, 2002, 2003, 2004, 2005, 2006, 2023

NCAA regional appearances
- 1977*, 1978*, 1979*, 1980*, 1981, 1982, 1983, 1984, 1985, 1987, 1988, 1989, 1990, 1991, 1992, 1993, 1994, 1996, 1997, 1998, 1999, 2001, 2002, 2003, 2004, 2005, 2006, 2007, 2008, 2009, 2010, 2011, 2012, 2013, 2014, 2015, 2017, 2018, 2019, 2021, 2022, 2023; Asterisk = AIAW

Conference champions
- 1983, 1990, 2003, 2004, 2005

The Tennessee Lady Volunteers cross country program represents the University of Tennessee (UT) located in Knoxville, Tennessee. The women's program competes in the National Collegiate Athletic Association (NCAA) Division I and the Southeastern Conference (SEC). The women's cross country team officially started in 1974.

Along with all other UT women's sports teams, it used the nickname "Lady Volunteers" (or the short form "Lady Vols") until the 2015–16 school year, when the school dropped the "Lady" prefix from the nicknames of all women's teams except in basketball. The “Lady Vol” name returned in 2017.

== Team history ==
The Tennessee Lady Volunteers women's cross country program began competing in 1974 and within three years reached their first AIAW Championship Tournament appearance. The Lady Vols won their first SEC title in 1983 and finished fourth in the NCAA Tournament. Their first head coach was Terry Crawford (1974–1983), who proved to be one of the best in program history. Crawford led the Lady Vols to 3 AIAW Championship appearances, two NCAA Championship appearances, two regional titles, an SEC Championship, and most notably a program high 4th-place finish at the 1983 NCAA Championships. Since 2010, the program has struggled to maintain its prior success. Overall, they have failed to record a top 3 SEC finish since 2009, and have failed to qualify for the NCAA Championships in every season since 2006.

=== J.J. Clark Era ===
The most successful coach historically for the Lady Volunteers was J. J. Clark who won three straight conference titles from 2003 to 2005. He came to UT after 10 seasons as the head coach of the Florida Gators women's cross country team from 1992 to 2002. Under his guidance the Tennessee's Lady Vols won four straight NCAA regionals, and made a program-record five consecutive NCAA Championship appearances. Additionally, Clark is the winningest coach in program history, and won 3 SEC Women's Coach of the Year awards at UT (2003, 2004, 2005). Under Clark 14 female cross country athletes won 31 All-South Region awards and 23 All-SEC honors. Besides his 5 team appearances in the NCAA Championships, Clark saw individuals Jackie Areson (2008, 2009, 2010), Sarah Bowman (2008), Brittany Sheffery (2011), and Katie Van Horn (2009, 2010). His earlier successes wained as he failed to guide the Lady Vols back to the NCAA Championships in each of his final 7 seasons, and failed to record a Top 5 SEC finish in his final 4 XC seasons.

=== Beth Alford-Sullivan Era ===
Under Beth Alford-Sullivan (2014–2021), the Lady Vols rarely found team success. However, Alford-Sullivan guided two time All-American Chelsea Blaase to an individual 2015 SEC runner-up finish, an NCAA South Regional win, and individual NCAA Championship appearances in 2014 (10th) and 2015 (14th). Alford-Sullivan was fired in May 2021 due to poor results across men's and women's XC and track. In 8 seasons under Alford-Sullivan, the Lady Vols finished in the top half of the SEC only three times. Additionally, they never once finished in the top 3 of the SEC or qualified for the NCAA Championships.

=== Sean Carlson Era ===
The Lady Vols are led by first year head coach Sean Carlson who spent 10 years prior to Tennessee as the head coach of the Notre Dame men's cross country and distance teams, in addition to serving as an assistant coach on the women's team. While at Notre Dame, the women's program finished in the top 30 of the NCAA Championships 8 times, and in the top 15 six times. On the men's side, Carlson developed Notre Dame into a national power, winning 3 ACC championships, and finishing in the top 10 of the NCAA Championships during each of his final three seasons. In his final season at Notre Dame, Carlson served as the head coach of the men's track team as well. Former Notre Dame assistant and nationally recognized recruiter, Nic Jacobsen followed Carlson to Knoxville, and serves as an assistant coach for both distance programs. In just his second year at the healm, he led the Lady Vols to a 6th-place finish at the NCAA Championships, their best result since another 6th place score in 1989.

== Home courses ==
The Lambert Acres Golf Club was previously the site of home cross country meets for the Volunteers from 1998 to 2013. The course still serves as a 27-hole golf course, and is nestled in the foothills of the Great Smoky Mountains and boasts 9,525 yards. Throughout its run, the course hosted the Tennessee Invitational 10 times, the NCAA South Regional in 2002, 2006 and 2008, and Southeastern Conference Championship in 1998. In 2014, the Vols moved much closer to home with the opening of the new Cherokee Farm Cross Country Course on Alcoa highway across the Tennessee River from the main UT campus. The course served as the practice venue for the team in 2014 and 2015, before finally serving in competition for the 2016 season. The course has two loops, one that is 2k and the other is 1k. The course was designed specifically for viewers to use the small loop, where it is ensured that runners have to pass the same point at least three times in a race.

== Yearly record ==
*Through February 2023
Information Source: 2023 Tennessee Cross Country Record Book – Women's Year-by-Year records

Year-by-year results
Year	Head Coach	Season Record	Win %	Conference Meet	NCAA Regional	NCAA Meet
Independent
1974	Terry Crawford	3–1	.750	–	–	–
1975	Terry Crawford	12–5	.706	–	–	–
1976	Terry Crawford	27–3	.900	–	–	–
1977	Terry Crawford	47–11–1	.805	–	1st (AIAW)	8th (AIAW)
1978	Terry Crawford	15–3	.833	–	3rd (AIAW)	–
1979	Terry Crawford	24–18	.571	–	3rd (AIAW)	14th (AIAW)
1980	Terry Crawford	42–10	.808	–	3rd (AIAW)	6th (AIAW)
1981	Terry Crawford	39–7	.848	–	4th (97)	–
1982	Terry Crawford	52–14	.788	–	3rd (80)	11th (262)
Southeastern Conference
1983	Terry Crawford	42–4	.913	1st (24)	1st (47)	4th (103)
1984	Gary Schwartz	30–22	.577	3rd (67)	8th (189)	–
1985	Gary Schwartz	58–31–1	.650	3rd (104)	8th (224)	–
1986	Gary Schwartz	20–18	.526	6th (170)	–	–
1987	Gary Schwartz	51–31	.622	4th (96)	9th (302)	–
1988	Missy Kane	49–19	.721	4th (115)	11th (230)	–
1989	Missy Kane	85–9	.904	2nd (66)	4th (152)	6th (227)
1990	Missy Kane	74–17	.813	1st (41)	4th (103)	12th (303)
1991	Missy Kane	61–15	.803	7th (167)	8th (278)	–
1992	Ann Bertucci	88–16	.846	5th (126)	9th (270)	–
1993	Ann Bertucci	77–29	.726	5th (137)	10th (318)	–
1994	Ann Bertucci	28–33–1	.456	8th (199)	27th (600)	–
1995	Dorothy Doolittle	25–37	.403	9th (267)	–	–
1996	Brenda Webb	38–64	.373	9th (216)	24th (627)	–
1997	Brenda Webb	68–23	.747	6th (180)	9th (279)	–
1998	Brenda Webb	74–34–1	.683	3rd (73)	3rd (86)	31st (640)
1999	Brenda Webb	43–37–1	.537	9th (191)	9th (199)	–
2000	Rodney Rothoff	65–30	.684	8th (196)	–	–
2001	Rodney Rothoff	95–35	.731	2nd (71)	6th (162)	–
2002	J.J. Clark	59–34–1	.633	3rd (86)	1st (72)	T-28th (657)
2003	J.J. Clark	99–31	.762	1st (57)	1st (71)	24th (513)
2004	J.J. Clark	121–25	.829	1st (55)	1st (78)	21st (488)
2005	J.J. Clark	125–32	.796	1st (48)	1st (76)	28th (641)
2006	J.J. Clark	114–40	.740	3rd (66)	3rd (80)	28th (565)
2007	J.J. Clark	104–19	.846	2nd (84)	4th (152)	–
2008	J.J. Clark	101–14	.878	3rd (107)	3rd (116)	–
2009	J.J. Clark	70–19	.787	2nd (80)	3rd (102)	–
2010	J.J. Clark	38–79	.325	12th (326)	18th (489)	–
2011	J.J. Clark	56–56	.500	7th (184)	13th (384)	–
2012	J.J. Clark	68–55–1	.548	12th (285)	10th (333)	–
2013	J.J. Clark	70–24–1	.737	8th (179)	9th (231)	–
2014	Beth Alford-Sullivan	37–46	.446	11th (274)	19th (510)	–
2015	Beth Alford-Sullivan	35–57	.380	11th (296)	19th (512)	–
2016	Beth Alford-Sullivan	16–50	.242	14th (393)	–	–
2017	Beth Alford-Sullivan	55–78	.414	10th (231)	10th (303)	–
2018	Beth Alford-Sullivan	60–14	.811	7th (197)	7th (221)	–
2019	Beth Alford-Sullivan	87–10	.897	4th (170)	3rd (144)	–
2020	Beth Alford-Sullivan	16–16	.500	–	N/A	–
2021	Beth Alford-Sullivan	96–18	.843	5th (136)	4th (121)	–
2022	Sean Carlson	72-15	.828	6th (159)	5th (144)	–
2023	Sean Carlson	109-20	.845	3rd (59)	1st (68)	6th (294)
Total		2807–1328–8	.679	5	7	0

Note: The Lady Vols did not compete in the 2020 SEC Championships due to high COVID-19 cases on the team. In 2020, the season was shortened, and NCAA regionals were not held, as teams advanced straight to the championships.

== All-Americans ==
The Lady Volunteers have a total of 11 women's cross country AIAW/NCAA All-Americans

- Valerie Bertrand – 1989
- Chelsea Blaase - 2014, 2015
- Sarah Bowman – 2008
- Kathy Bryant-Hadler – 1980, 1981, 1982
- Sharon Dickie – 2000
- Jasmin Jones – 1989
- Liz Natale – 1983
- Linda Portasik – 1980
- Alison Quelch – 1983
- Brenda Webb – 1977, 1978
- Patty Wiegand – 1989

== See also ==
- Tennessee women's track and field
- Tennessee men's track and field
- Tennessee men's cross country
