= 2015 NCAA Division I cross country championships =

2015 cross-country running meet of the NCAA (Division I)

2015 NCAA Division I Cross Country Championships
- Dates: November 21, 2015
- Host city: Louisville, Kentucky; University of Louisville
- Venue: E. P. "Tom" Sawyer State Park
- Events: 4

The 2015 NCAA Division I Cross Country Championships were the 77th NCAA Men's Division I Cross Country Championship and the 35th NCAA Women's Division I Cross Country Championship to determine the national champions of men's and women's NCAA Division I collegiate cross country running. It was held at E. P. "Tom" Sawyer State Park in Louisville, Kentucky and was hosted by the University of Louisville on November 21, 2015. Four different championships were contested: men's and women's individual and team championships.

Syracuse won the men's team championship, their first since 1951. Oregon's Edward Cheserek won the men's individual event, his third consecutive championship. Cheserek joined Gerry Lindgren, Steve Prefontaine, and Henry Rono as the event's only three-time champions.

New Mexico won the women's team championship, their first. It was UNM's first women's team national championship in any sport. Notre Dame's Molly Seidel won the individual event.

== Men's title ==
- Distance: 10,000 meters

=== Men's Team Result (Top 10) ===
Rank	Team	Scorers	Points
1st place, gold medalist(s)	Syracuse	3 + 7 + 8 + 29 + 35	82
2nd place, silver medalist(s)	Colorado	2 + 20 + 21 + 23 + 25	91
3rd place, bronze medalist(s)	Stanford	5 + 6 + 14 + 50 + 76	151
4	Oregon	1 + 34 + 38 + 44 + 66	183
5	Iona	16 + 33 + 46 + 48 + 88	231
6	Arkansas	19 + 30 + 36 + 69 + 90	244
7	Louisville (H)	15 + 31 + 41 + 68 + 176	331
8	Washington	22 + 24 + 75 + 79 + 145	345
9	Michigan	52 + 56 + 64 + 72 + 104	348
10	Georgetown	4 + 37 + 82 + 103 + 126	352

- (H) – Host team

=== Men's Individual Result (Top 10) ===
Rank	Name	Team	Time	Points
1st place, gold medalist(s)	(Kenya) Edward Cheserek	Oregon	28:45.7	1
2nd place, silver medalist(s)	(Australia) Patrick Tiernan	Villanova	29:11.1	–
3rd place, bronze medalist(s)	(United States) Pierce Murphy	Colorado	29:37.0	2
4	(Canada) Justyn Knight	Syracuse	29:46.1	3
5	(United States) Jonathan Green	Georgetown	29:49.5	4
6	(Puerto Rico) Jim Rosa	Stanford	29:52.7	5
7	(United States) Sean McGorty	Stanford	29:53.4	6
8	(United States) Colin Bennie	Syracuse	29:55.9	7
9	(United States) Martin Hehir	Syracuse	29:59.5	8
10	(United Kingdom) Marc Scott	Tulsa	30:02.6	9

== Women's title ==
- Distance: 6,000 meters

=== Women's Team Result (Top 10) ===
Rank	Team	Scorers	Points
1st place, gold medalist(s)	New Mexico	4 + 5 + 11 + 12 + 17	49
2nd place, silver medalist(s)	Colorado	10 + 13 + 30 + 32 + 44	129
3rd place, bronze medalist(s)	Oregon	18 + 19 + 21 + 77 + 79	214
4	Providence	15 + 25 + 42 + 68 + 81	231
5	NC State; Michigan	38 + 40 + 49 + 62 + 75; 14 + 36 + 60 + 67 + 87	264
6	Oklahoma State	22 + 27 + 48 + 88 + 89	274
7	Notre Dame; Arkansas	1 + 6 + 64 + 101 + 104; 3 + 31 + 70 + 78 + 94	276
8	Washington	7 + 53 + 63 + 74 + 100	297
9	Boise State	2 + 8 + 34 + 127 + 159	330
10	Syracuse	35 + 37 + 46 + 107 + 134	359

=== Women's Individual Result (Top 10) ===
Rank	Name	Team	Time	Points
1st place, gold medalist(s)	(United States) Molly Seidel	Notre Dame	19:28.6	1
2nd place, silver medalist(s)	(United States) Allie Ostrander	Boise State	19:33.6	2
3rd place, bronze medalist(s)	(South Africa) Dominique Scott	Arkansas	19:40.9	3
4	(United States) Courtney Frerichs	New Mexico	19:48.0	4
5	(United Kingdom) Alice Wright	New Mexico	19:53.1	5
6	(United States) Anna Rohrer	Notre Dame	19:59.7	6
7	(United States) Allie Buchalski	Furman	20:02.6	–
8	(United States) Maddie Meyers	Washington	20:03.1	7
9	(United States) Brenna Peloquin	Boise State	20:04.3	8
10	(Kenya) Sharon Lokedi	Kansas	20:04.9	9

== See also ==
- NCAA Men's Division II Cross Country Championship
- NCAA Women's Division II Cross Country Championship
- NCAA Men's Division III Cross Country Championship
- NCAA Women's Division III Cross Country Championship
