= Betsy Nagelsen =

American tennis player

- Country (sports): United States
- Residence: Maui, Hawaii & Orlando, Florida, U.S.
- Born: October 23, 1956 (age 70) St. Petersburg, Florida, U.S.
- Height: 1.75 m (5 ft 9 in)
- Turned pro: 1973
- Retired: 1996
- Plays: Right-handed
- Prize money: $1,016,519

Singles
- Career record: 194–256
- Career titles: 3
- Highest ranking: No. 23 (end 1981)

Grand Slam singles results
- Australian Open: F (1978)
- French Open: 2R (1975, 1978)
- Wimbledon: 4R (1981, 1986)
- US Open: 3R (1974, 1976, 1980, 1988)

Doubles
- Career record: 385–253
- Career titles: 25
- Highest ranking: No. 11 (March 14, 1988)

Grand Slam doubles results
- Australian Open: W (1978, 1980)
- French Open: SF (1981, 1985)
- Wimbledon: F (1987)
- US Open: SF (1978, 1984, 1987)

Grand Slam mixed doubles results
- US Open: F (1987)

Helen Elizabeth "Betsy" Nagelsen McCormack (born October 23, 1956) is an American former professional tennis player.

== Career ==
Nagelsen was the world's top junior in 1973. She won the 1973 U.S. Champion Girls' 16 and under singles. She also won the USTA Girls' Sportsmanship Award in 1974. As a professional, she won the doubles championship at the 1978 and 1980 Australian Opens (with Renáta Tomanová and Martina Navratilova, respectively), and reached the singles final of the 1978 Australian Open, losing to Christine O'Neil. Over her 21-year career on the WTA Tour, Nagelsen won 25 doubles titles and three singles titles.

Nagelsen reached her career-high singles ranking by the end of 1981, when she became the world No. 23. She also reached a career-high ranking in doubles of No. 11 on March 4, 1988. She had career wins over Navratilova, Arantxa Sánchez Vicario, Sue Barker, Pam Shriver, Claudia Kohde-Kilsch, Rosie Casals, Betty Stöve, and Sylvia Hanika. She was a four-time member of the U.S. Wightman Cup Team in 1974, 1985, 1988 and 1989.

After her retirement in 1996, Nagelsen became a commentator for ABC and ESPN in the United States and Australia's Nine Network. She married Mark McCormack, founder of the sports management group IMG, on March 1, 1986. The couple donated money for the McCormack-Nagelsen Tennis Center at the College of William and Mary in Williamsburg, Virginia. The Intercollegiate Tennis Association's Women's Tennis Hall of Fame is located on the site.

== Grand Slam finals ==
=== Singles: 1 (runner-up) ===
Result	Year	Championship	Surface	Opponent	Score
Loss	1978	Australian Open	Grass	(Australia) Chris O'Neil	3–6, 6–7^{(3–7)}

=== Doubles: 4 (2 titles, 2 runner-ups) ===
Result	Year	Championship	Surface	Partner	Opponents	Score
Loss	1977^{(J)}	Australian Open	Grass	(Australia) Kerry Reid	(Australia) Dianne Fromholtz (Australia) Helen Gourlay	7–5, 1–6, 5–7
Win	1978	Australian Open	Grass	(Czechoslovakia) Renáta Tomanová	(Japan) Naoko Sato (United States) Pam Whytcross	7–5, 6–2
Win	1980	Australian Open	Grass	(United States) Martina Navratilova	(United States) Ann Kiyomura (United States) Candy Reynolds	6–4, 6–4
Loss	1987	Wimbledon	Grass	(Australia) Elizabeth Smylie	(West Germany) Claudia Kohde-Kilsch (Czechoslovakia) Helena Suková	5–7, 5–7

=== Mixed doubles: 1 (runner-up) ===
Result	Year	Championship	Surface	Partner	Opponents	Score
Loss	1987	US Open	Hard	(United States) Paul Annacone	(United States) Martina Navratilova (Spain) Emilio Sánchez	4–6, 7–6^{(8–6)}, 6–7^{(12–14)}

== Grand Slam tournament performance timeline ==
Key
W	F	SF	QF	#R	RR	Q#	DNQ	A	NH

(W) winner; (F) finalist; (SF) semifinalist; (QF) quarterfinalist; (#R) rounds 4, 3, 2, 1; (RR) round-robin stage; (Q#) qualification round; (DNQ) did not qualify; (A) absent; (NH) not held; (SR) strike rate (events won / competed); (W–L) win–loss record.

=== Singles ===
Tournament	1974	1975	1976	1977		1978	1979	1980	1981	1982	1983	1984	1985	1986	1987	1988	1989	1990	1991	1992	1993	SR
Australian Open	A	A	A	1R	A	F	A	3R	2R	A	2R	1R	2R	NH	2R	1R	A	A	A	A	A	0 / 9
French Open	1R	2R	1R	A		2R	A	1R	1R	1R	1R	1R	1R	1R	A	A	A	1R	A	A	A	0 / 12
Wimbledon	3R	2R	1R	2R		2R	2R	3R	4R	2R	3R	2R	1R	4R	1R	1R	1R	3R	1R	Q1	Q2	0 / 18
US Open	3R	A	3R	1R		1R	1R	3R	2R	1R	1R	1R	1R	2R	2R	3R	2R	A	A	A	A	0 / 15
Strike rate	0 / 3	0 / 2	0 / 3	0 / 3		0 / 4	0 / 2	0 / 4	0 / 4	0 / 3	0 / 4	0 / 4	0 / 4	0 / 3	0 / 3	0 / 3	0 / 2	0 / 2	0 / 1	0 / 0	0 / 0	0 / 54

Note: The Australian Open was held twice in 1977, in January and December.

== WTA Tour finals ==
=== Doubles: 36 (24–12) ===
Result	W/L	Date	Tournament	Surface	Partner	Opponents	Score
Win	1–0	Jul 1976	Gstaad, Switzerland	Clay	(Australia) Wendy Turnbull	(South Africa) Brigitte Cuypers (South Africa) Annette Du Plooy	6–4, 6–4
Win	2–0	Dec 1976	Sydney, Australia	Grass	(Australia) Helen Gourlay	(Australia) Dianne Fromholtz (Czechoslovakia) Renáta Tomanová	6–4, 6–1
Loss	2–1	Jan 1977	Australian Open	Grass	(Australia) Kerry Reid	(Australia) Dianne Fromholtz (Australia) Helen Gourlay	7–5, 1–6, 5–7
Loss	2–2	May 1978	Rome, Italy	Clay	(Romania) Florența Mihai	(Socialist Federal Republic of Yugoslavia) Mima Jaušovec (Romania) Virginia Ruzici	2–6, 6–2, 6–7
Win	3–2	Dec 1978	Australian Open	Grass	(Czechoslovakia) Renáta Tomanová	(Japan) Naoko Sato (United States) Pam Whytcross	7–5, 6–2
Win	4–2	Oct 1979	Tokyo, Japan	Carpet	(United States) Penny Johnson	(China) Chen Chuan (China) Yu Li-Qiao	3–6, 6–4, 7–6
Loss	4–3	Aug 1980	Toronto, Canada	Hard	(United States) Ann Kiyomura	(United States) Andrea Jaeger (Czechoslovakia) Regina Maršíková	1–6, 3–6
Win	5–3	Dec 1980	Australian Open	Grass	(United States) Martina Navratilova	(United States) Ann Kiyomura (United States) Candy Reynolds	6–4, 6–4
Win	6–3	Sep 1981	Atlanta, US	Hard	(United States) Laura duPont	(United States) Rosie Casals (United States) Candy Reynolds	6–4, 7–5
Loss	6–4	Nov 1981	Perth, Australia	Grass	(United States) Candy Reynolds	(United States) Barbara Potter (United States) Sharon Walsh	4–6, 2–6
Win	7–4	Aug 1982	Atlanta, US	Hard	(United States) Kathy Jordan	(United States) Chris Evert (United States) Billie Jean King	4–6, 7–6^{(13–11)}, 7–6^{(7–3)}
Loss	7–5	Aug 1983	Los Angeles, U.S.	Hard	(Romania) Virginia Ruzici	(United States) Martina Navratilova (United States) Pam Shriver	1–6, 0–6
Win	8–5	Mar 1984	Palm Beach Gardens, US	Clay	(United States) Anne White	(South Africa) Rosalyn Fairbank (United States) Candy Reynolds	2–6, 6–2, 6–2
Win	9–5	Sep 1984	San Diego, US	Hard	(United States) Paula Smith	(United States) Terry Holladay (Poland) Iwona Kuczyńska	6–2, 6–4
Win	10–5	Oct 1984	Tokyo, Japan	Hard	(United States) Candy Reynolds	(Argentina) Emilse Longo (Argentina) Adriana Villagrán	6–3, 6–2
Win	11–5	Jan 1985	Port St. Lucie, US	Hard	(United States) Paula Smith	(Switzerland) Christiane Jolissaint (Netherlands) Marcella Mesker	6–3, 6–4
Loss	11–6	Apr 1985	Tokyo, Japan	Carpet (i)	(United States) Anne White	(United States) Kathy Jordan (Australia) Elizabeth Smylie	6–4, 5–7, 2–6
Loss	11–7	Jan 1986	Key Biscayne, US	Hard	(United States) Barbara Potter	(United States) Kathy Jordan (Australia) Elizabeth Smylie	6–7^{(6–8)}, 6–2, 2–6
Win	12–7	Mar 1986	Phoenix, US	Hard	(United States) Susan Mascarin	(United States) Linda Gates (United States) Alycia Moulton	6–3, 5–7, 6–4
Win	13–7	May 1986	Lugano, Switzerland	Clay	(United States) Elise Burgin	(Australia) Jenny Byrne (Australia) Janine Tremelling	6–2, 6–3
Win	14–7	Aug 1986	Mahwah, US	Hard	(Australia) Elizabeth Smylie	(West Germany) Steffi Graf (Czechoslovakia) Helena Suková	7–6^{(7–4)}, 6–3
Loss	14–8	Dec 1986	Brisbane, Australia	Grass	(Australia) Elizabeth Smylie	(Czechoslovakia) Hana Mandlíková (Australia) Wendy Turnbull	4–6, 3–6
Win	15–8	Jan 1987	Sydney, Australia	Grass	(Australia) Elizabeth Smylie	(Australia) Jenny Byrne (Australia) Janine Thompson	6–7^{(5–7)}, 7–5, 6–1
Loss	15–9	Mar 1987	Piscataway, US	Carpet (i)	(Australia) Elizabeth Smylie	(United States) Gigi Fernández (United States) Lori McNeil	1–6, 4–6
Win	16–9	Apr 1987	Tokyo, Japan	Hard	(United States) Kathy Jordan	(United States) Sandy Collins (United States) Sharon Walsh	6–3, 7–5
Win	17–9	May 1987	Geneva, Switzerland	Clay	(Australia) Elizabeth Smylie	(Peru) Laura Gildemeister (France) Catherine Tanvier	4–6, 6–4, 6–3
Loss	17–10	Jun 1987	Wimbledon, UK	Grass	(Australia) Elizabeth Smylie	(West Germany) Claudia Kohde-Kilsch (Czechoslovakia) Helena Suková	5–7, 5–7
Win	18–10	Jan 1988	Brisbane, Australia	Grass	(United States) Pam Shriver	(West Germany) Claudia Kohde-Kilsch (Czechoslovakia) Helena Suková	2–6, 7–5, 6–2
Loss	18–11	Oct 1988	New Orleans, US	Hard	(United States) Lori McNeil	(United States) Beth Herr (United States) Candy Reynolds	4–6, 4–6
Win	19–11	Oct 1988	Brighton, UK	Carpet (i)	(United States) Lori McNeil	(France) Isabelle Demongeot (France) Nathalie Tauziat	7–6^{(7–5)}, 2–6, 7–6^{(7–4)}
Win	20–11	Nov 1988	Chicago, US	Carpet (i)	(United States) Lori McNeil	(Soviet Union) Larisa Savchenko (Soviet Union) Natasha Zvereva	6–4, 3–6, 6–4
Win	21–11	Feb 1989	Fairfax, US	Carpet	(United States) Pam Shriver	(Soviet Union) Larisa Savchenko (Soviet Union) Natasha Zvereva	6–2, 6–3
Win	22–11	Feb 1989	Memphis, US	Hard (i)	(United States) Lori McNeil	(United States) Elise Burgin (Australia) Elizabeth Smylie	w/o
Win	23–11	Sep 1989	Dallas, US	Carpet (i)	(United States) Mary Joe Fernández	(United States) Elise Burgin (South Africa) Rosalyn Fairbank	7–6^{(7–5)}, 6–3
Loss	23–12	May 1990	Geneva, Switzerland	Clay	(United States) Elise Burgin	(Australia) Louise Field (South Africa) Dianne Van Rensburg	7–5, 6–7, 5–7
Win	24–12	Jul 1990	Montreal, Canada	Hard	(Argentina) Gabriela Sabatini	(Canada) Helen Kelesi (Italy) Raffaella Reggi	3–6, 6–2, 6–2

== See also ==
- Performance timelines for all female tennis players since 1978 who reached at least one Grand Slam final
