= 1979 AIAW Division I field hockey tournament =

1979 AIAW-USFHA Division I field hockey tournament
Tournament details
- Host country: United States
- City: Princeton, New Jersey
- Teams: 16
- Venue: Princeton University

Final positions
- Champions: Long Beach State (1st title)
- Runner-up: Penn State
- Third place: Maryland

Tournament statistics
- Matches played: 27
- Goals scored: 83 (3.07 per match)

The 1979 Division I AIAW-USFHA field hockey tournament was the fifth annual single-elimination tournament joint hosted by the Association for Intercollegiate Athletics for Women and the United States Field Hockey Association to determine the national champion of women's collegiate field hockey among their Division I members in the United States, the culmination of the 1979 AIAW Division I field hockey season.

Long Beach State won its first AIAW national title, defeating Penn State in the final, 2–0.

The tournament was played at Princeton University in Princeton, New Jersey.

== Bracket ==
=== Championship ===
First round
Penn State	3
Princeton	0
Oregon	0
William & Mary	2
San Jose State	0
Saint Louis	3
Massachusetts	3
Michigan State	2
Long Beach State	3
Springfield	1
Davis & Elkins	3
Iowa	0
Stanford	0
Ursinus	2
Maryland	4
Washington State	0

Second round
Penn State	1
William & Mary	0
Saint Louis	1
Massachusetts	3
Long Beach State	2
Davis & Elkins	1
Ursinus	0
Maryland	1**

Semifinals
Penn State	3*
Massachusetts	2
Long Beach State	2*
Maryland	1

Championship
Penn State	0
Long Beach State	2
Third place
Massachusetts	0
Maryland	2

=== Consolation ===
Consolation first round
Springfield	4*
Iowa	3
Stanford	3
Washington State	1
Princeton	1
Oregon	0
San Jose State	3
Michigan State	0

Consolation quarterfinals
William & Mary	4
Springfield	0
Saint Louis	2
Stanford	1
Davis & Elkins	2
Princeton	3*
Ursinus	1
San Jose State	2

Consolation semifinals
William & Mary	1
Saint Louis	0
Princeton	3
San Jose State	1

Fifth place
William & Mary	1
Princeton	0

- * indicates an overtime period

== See also ==
- 1979 AIAW Division II field hockey tournament
- 1979 AIAW Division III field hockey tournament
