= 1966 NCAA University Division cross country championships =

1966 cross-country running meet of the NCAA (University Division)

1966 NCAA University Division Cross Country Championships
- Organisers: NCAA
- Edition: 28th
- Date: November 21, 1966
- Host city: Lawrence, KS; University of Kansas
- Venue: Rim Rock Farm
- Distances: 6 miles (9.7 km)
- Participation: 189 athletes

The 1966 NCAA University Division Cross Country Championships were the 28th annual cross country meet to determine the team and individual national champions of men's collegiate cross country running in the United States. Held on November 21, 1966, the meet was hosted for the second straight year by the University of Kansas at Rim Rock Farm in Lawrence, Kansas. The distance for this race was 6 miles (9.7 kilometers).

All NCAA University Division members were eligible to qualify for the meet. In total, 25 teams and 189 individual runners contested this championship.

The team national championship was won by the Villanova Wildcats, their first team title. The individual championship was won by Gerry Lindgren, from Washington State, with a time of 29:01.04. Lindgren's time set the new event distance record, breaking the record set the previous year by John Lawson. Lindgren's time would hold until 1969, when he himself would break it during his senior year.

== Men's title ==
- Distance: 6 miles (9.7 kilometers)

=== Team Result (Top 10) ===
Rank	Team	Points
1st place, gold medalist(s)	Villanova	79
2nd place, silver medalist(s)	Kansas State	155
3rd place, bronze medalist(s)	San José State	183
4	Iowa	193
5	Washington State	208
6	Colorado	248
7	Southern Illinois; Oregon State	253
8	Western Michigan	256
9	Houston	292
10	New Mexico	311

== See also ==
- NCAA Men's Division II Cross Country Championship
