= AIAW field hockey tournament =

Annual field hockey tournament

- Sport: Field hockey
- Founded: 1975
- Folded: 1982
- Replaced by: NCAA tournament
- Country: United States
- Most titles: West Chester State (4)

The AIAW field hockey tournament was an annual tournament hosted by the Association for Intercollegiate Athletics for Women between 1975 and 1981 to determine the national champion of women's collegiate field hockey among its members programs in the United States. Between 1979 and 1981, separate tournaments were held for the teams falling into the AIAW's three divisions.

== Champions ==
=== Single division ===
- Co-sponsored 1975–78 by the United States Field Hockey Association (USFHA)

AIAW field hockey tournament
Year	Stadium	Championship		
Year	Stadium	Champion	Score	Runner-up
1975; Details	Harrisonburg, VA	West Chester State	4–3 (2OT)	Ursinus
1976; Details	West Chester, PA	West Chester State (2)	2–0	Ursinus
1977; Details	Denver, CO	West Chester State (3)	1–0	Ursinus
1978; Details	Ellensburg, WA	West Chester State (4)	3–0	Delaware

=== Division I ===
AIAW Division I field hockey tournament
Year	Stadium	Championship		
Year	Stadium	Champion	Score	Runner-up
1979; Details	Princeton, NJ	Long Beach State	2–0	Penn State
1980; Details	Carbondale, IL	Penn State	2–1	California
1981; Details	Berkeley, CA	Penn State (2)	5–1	Temple

=== Division II ===
- 1979 Southwest Missouri State def. Colgate (New York) 2-0
- 1980 La Salle (Pennsylvania) def. Southwest Missouri State 3-2
- 1981 Lock Haven (Pennsylvania) def. Syracuse 2-0

=== Division III ===
- 1979 Shippensburg (Pennsylvania) def. Franklin & Marshall (Pennsylvania) 1-0
- 1980 Gettysburg (Pennsylvania) def. Hartwick (New York) 1-0 (ps)
- 1981 Bloomsburg (Pennsylvania) def. Lynchburg (Virginia) 3-2

== See also ==
- AIAW Intercollegiate Women's Field Hockey Champions
- NCAA Division I field hockey tournament (began 1981)
- NCAA Division II field hockey tournament (began 1981)
- NCAA Division III field hockey tournament (began 1981)
- USA Field Hockey Hall of Fame
