= 2014 NCAA men's gymnastics championships =

American college gymnastics competition

The 2014 NCAA Men's Gymnastics Championships was a three-day event which determined the 2014 National Champion in Men's Gymnastics. The event took place from April 10 to April 12, 2014, at the Crisler Center in Ann Arbor, Michigan, United States, as it was hosted by the University of Michigan.

== National qualifier sessions ==
=== Session 1 ===
The first national qualifier session of the 2014 NCAA Men's Gymnastics Championships took place on Thursday April 10 at 1 P.M. The following teams competed in Session 1 of the 2014 NCAA Men's Gymnastics Championships:

- No. 1 Oklahoma
- No. 4 Stanford
- No. 5 Illinois
- No. 8 Iowa
- No. 9 California
- No. 12 William & Mary

This was the rotation order for session 1 of the 2014 NCAA Men's Gymnastics championships:

Rotation	Floor exercises	Pommel horse	Rings	Vault	Parallel bars	High bars
1	Illinois	California	Iowa	Stanford	Oklahoma	William & Mary
2	William & Mary	Illinois	California	Iowa	Stanford	Oklahoma
3	Oklahoma	William & Mary	Illinois	California	Iowa	Stanford
4	Stanford	Oklahoma	William & Mary	Illinois	California	Iowa
5	Iowa	Stanford	Oklahoma	William & Mary	Illinois	California
6	California	Iowa	Stanford	Oklahoma	William & Mary	Illinois

Here are the results for session 1 of the 2014 NCAA Men's Gymnastics Championships:

Rank	Team	Score	Floor exercises	Pommel horse	Rings	Vault	Parallel bars	High bars
1	Oklahoma	440	75.5 (1)	73.2 (1)	73.6 (2)	73.7 (2)	72.9 (2)	71.1 (1)
2	Stanford	433.55	75 (2)	69.65 (4)	71.1 (4)	73.95 (1)	73.05 (1)	70.2 (3)
3	Illinois	432.85	71.9 (4)	72.05 (2)	74.35 (1)	72.2 (4)	71.8 (3)	70.55 (2)
4	Iowa	425.95	71.5 (5)	68.85 (5)	72.8 (3)	72.05 (6)	71.35 (4)	69.4 (4)
5	California	425.7	72.85 (3)	69.95 (3)	70.75 (5)	72.8 (3)	70.85 (5)	68.5 (5)
6	William & Mary	415.35	70.15 (6)	68.2 (6)	68.85 (6)	72.1 (5)	67.9 (6)	68.15 (6)

=== Session 2 ===
The second national qualifier session of the 2014 NCAA Men's Gymnastics Championships took place on Thursday April 10 at 7 P.M. The following teams competed in Session 2 of the 2014 NCAA Men's Gymnastics Championships:

- No. 2 Michigan
- No. 3 Ohio State
- No. 6 Penn State
- No. 7 Minnesota
- No. 10 Air Force
- No. 11 Nebraska

This was the rotation order for Session 2 of the 2014 NCAA Men's Gymnastics championships:

Rotation	Floor exercises	Pommel horse	Rings	Vault	Parallel bars	High bars
1	Penn State	Air Force	Nebraska	Michigan	Minnesota	Ohio State
2	Ohio State	Penn State	Air Force	Nebraska	Michigan	Minnesota
3	Minnesota	Ohio State	Penn State	Air Force	Nebraska	Michigan
4	Michigan	Minnesota	Ohio State	Penn State	Air Force	Nebraska
5	Nebraska	Michigan	Minnesota	Ohio State	Penn State	Air Force
6	Air Force	Nebraska	Michigan	Minnesota	Ohio State	Penn State

Here are the results for session 1 of the 2014 NCAA Men's Gymnastics Championships:

Rank	Team	Score	Floor exercises	Pommel horse	Rings	Vault	Parallel bars	High bars
1	Michigan	444.1	74.25 (2)	73.4 (1)	73.5 (1)	75.1 (1)	75.5 (1)	72.35 (1)
2	Ohio State	437.95	75.3 (1)	73.2 (2)	72.3 (3)	73.35 (2)	72.55 (3)	71.25 (4)
3	Penn State	433.1	73.7 (3)	69.85 (4)	71.5 (5)	73.15 (3)	72.85 (2)	72.05 (2)
4	Minnesota	429.55	71.55 (5)	71.7 (3)	72.5 (2)	72.8 (4)	71.75 (4)	69.25 (6)
5	Nebraska	426.35	71.65 (4)	69.7 (5)	71.7 (4)	72.55 (5)	70.6 (5)	70.15 (5)
6	Air Force	418.2	70.15 (6)	67 (6)	69.6 (6)	70.6 (6)	69.35 (6)	71.5 (3)

== Team and all-around finals ==
The team and all-around finals took place on Friday April 11 at 7 P.M. and were televised on BTN. The top three teams from each National Qualifier session on Thursday competed in this event. Additionally, from each session, the top three all-around competitors not on one of the qualifying teams plus the top three individuals on each event not already qualified on a team or as an all-around competitor participated in this event.

== Individual event finals ==
The individual event finals took place on Saturday April 12 at 7 P.M. The top 10 individuals on each apparatus Friday qualified for this event.
