= Brian Mann =

American football player and administrator

William & Mary Tribe
- Title: Athletic director

Personal information
- Born: May 7, 1980 (age 46); Westwood, Massachusetts, U.S.
- Listed height: 6 ft 2 in (1.88 m)
- Listed weight: 205 lb (93 kg)

Career information
- Position: Quarterback
- High school: Xaverian Brothers (Westwood)
- College: Dartmouth
- NFL draft: 2002: undrafted

Career history

Playing
- Los Angeles Avengers (2004–2006)

Operations
- Dartmouth (2011–2014) Assistant athletic director; Rice (2014–2019) Associate athletic director; California (2019–2021) Senior associate athletic director; William & Mary (2021–present) Athletic director

Career AFL statistics
- Comp. / Att.: 96 / 170
- Passing yards: 1,224
- TD–INT: 19–4
- QB rating: 97.28
- Rushing TD: 1
- Stats at ArenaFan.com

Brian Mann is the athletic director at the College of William & Mary in Williamsburg, Virginia. Mann was formerly the senior associate athletic director and chief development officer at the University of California.

He is an American former football quarterback for the Los Angeles Avengers in the Arena Football League. Mann holds the Dartmouth College football single-season record for passing yards with 2,913. He was previously the associate athletic director for development at Rice University in Houston, Texas.

== Playing career ==
=== High school ===
Brian Mann attended Xaverian Brothers High School in Westwood, Massachusetts, and was a student and a three-sport captain in football, basketball, and baseball. In football, his team won two consecutive state titles.

=== College ===
Mann attended Dartmouth College and was a four-year letterman in football. As a senior, he passed for a school single-season record 2,913 yards, was the team MVP, and was an All-Ivy League selection.

While at Dartmouth he was a member of the football fraternity Gamma Delta Chi.

== Movie career ==
Through his career, Brian has landed roles as a body double for quarterback roles such as Adam Sandler's double in the remake of The Longest Yard and the role as the quarterback in Invincible.

== Personal life ==
Mann is currently married to Hilary Wellinghoff, of Houston, TX.
