= Crisler Center =

Basketball arena at the University of Michigan

- "The House That Cazzie Built"
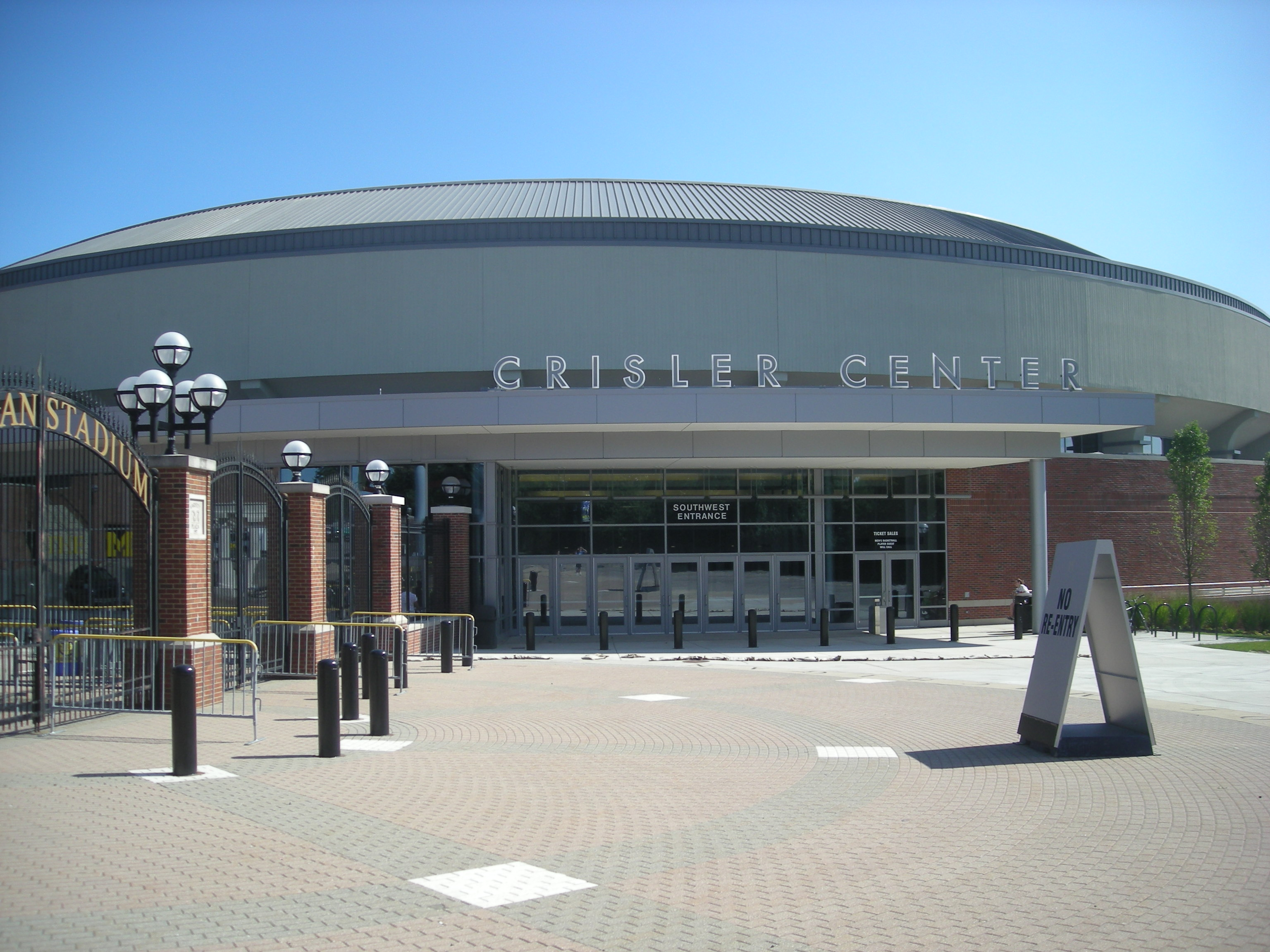
- Crisler Center in 2013
- Interactive map of Crisler Center
- Former names: University Events Building (1967–1970); Crisler Arena (1970–2011)
- Location: 333 E Stadium Blvd; Ann Arbor, MI 48104
- Coordinates: 42.265037°N 83.746768°W
- Owner: University of Michigan
- Operator: University of Michigan
- Capacity: 13,684 (1967); 13,609 (1968–1991); 13,562 (1991–2001); 13,751 (2001–2011); 12,721 (2011–2012); 12,693 (2012–2013); 12,707 (2013–present)
- Surface: Hardwood

Construction
- Groundbreaking: September 18, 1965
- Opened: December 6, 1967
- Renovated: 1998, 2001, 2012
- Cost: $7.2 million ($69.5 million in 2025 dollars)
- Architects: Daniel L. Dworsky Associates; Kenneth C. Black Associates, Inc.
- General contractor: Spence Brothers Company

Tenants
- Michigan Men's Basketball (NCAA) (1967–present); Michigan Women's Basketball (NCAA) (1974–present); Michigan Women's Gymnastics (NCAA) (1978–1989, 2004–present); Former tenants Michigan Men's Gymnastics (1978–1989); Michigan Wrestling (1967–1989); Michigan Volleyball (1984–1986)

Crisler Center (formerly known as the University Events Building and Crisler Arena) is an indoor basketball arena located on the campus of the University of Michigan in Ann Arbor. It serves as the home arena for the men's and women's basketball teams, as well as the women's gymnastics team at the university.

== History ==
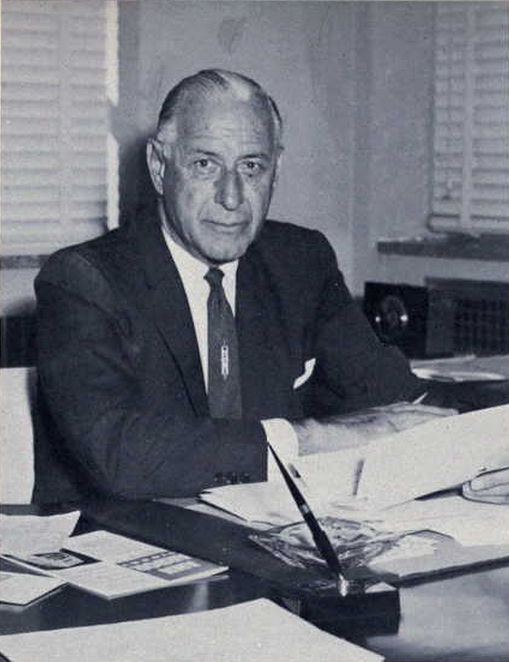
Fritz Crisler from 1962 Michiganensian

Constructed in 1967, Crisler Center is named for Fritz Crisler, the university's athletic director from 1941 to 1968. It was designed by alumnus Dan Dworsky.

The arena, often dubbed "The House that Cazzie Built", is a reference to alumnus Cazzie Russell, whose popularity led to the basketball team's fan base exceeding the capacity of Yost Fieldhouse, prompting the construction of the facility.

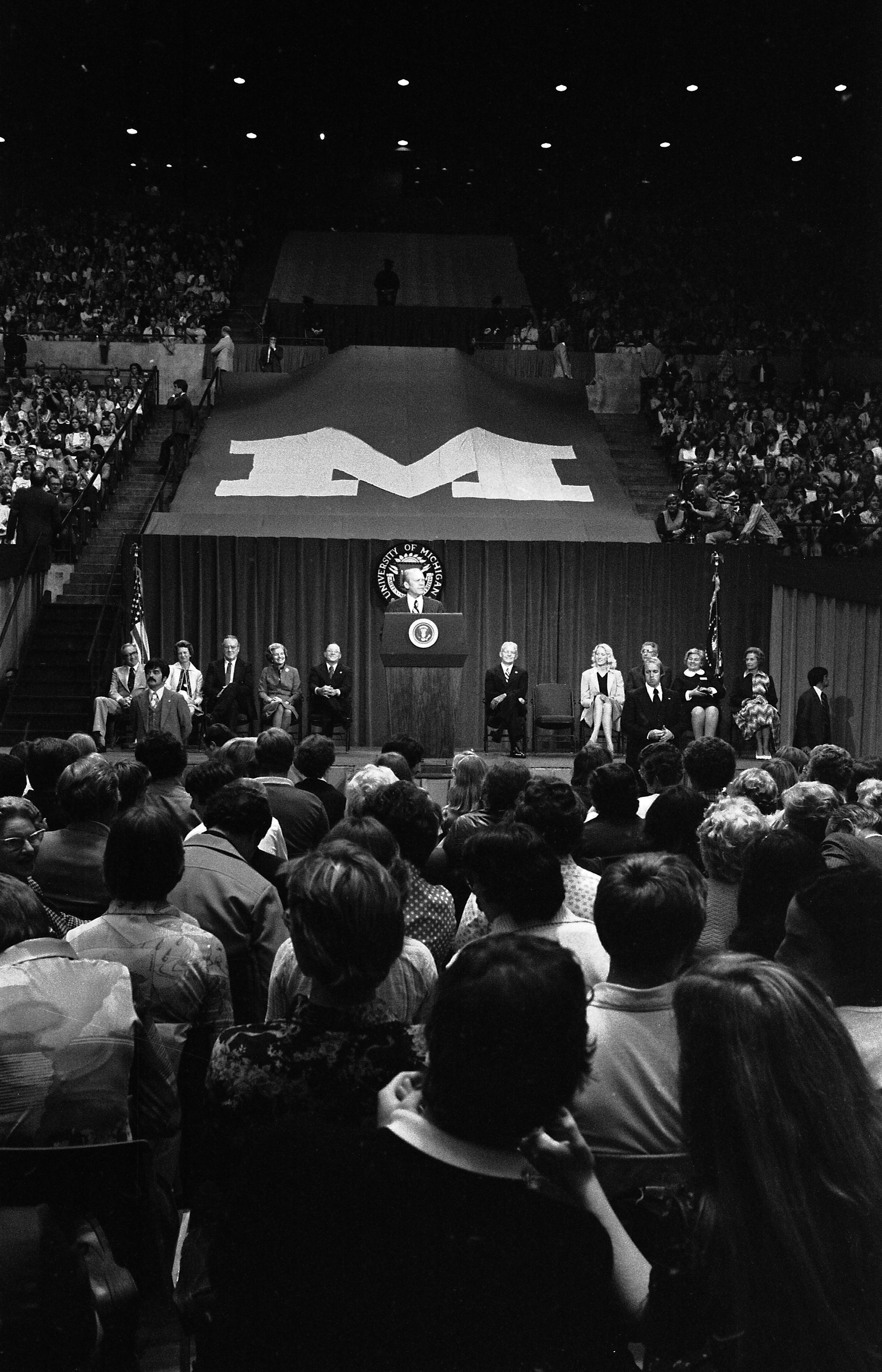
U.S. President Gerald R. Ford delivering remarks at his 1976 presidential campaign kickoff rally at Crisler Arena

The facility hosted the 1980–1982 Mid-American Conference men's basketball tournament. It has also hosted Big Ten and NCAA gymnastics championships, the 1999 Big Ten wrestling championship, and other events. Prior to the opening of Cliff Keen Arena, the arena was the full-time home to the men's and women's gymnastics teams and the wrestling team. The women's gymnastics team continues to hold significant meets in the arena.

The arena has also hosted concerts, including the opening show of Bruce Springsteen & The E Street Band's The River Tour. John Lennon and Yoko Ono performed 4 songs at the arena on December 10, 1971. Elvis Presley performed at the arena on April 24, 1977.

The 2014 NCAA Men's Gymnastics championship was held at Crisler Center. Michigan's Men's Gymnastics team won their second consecutive national championship in that meet.

== Renovation ==
The university completed a $52 million renovation to the Crisler Center in 2012. A new scoreboard was added along with the construction of an athletic facility in between the arena and Michigan Stadium called the Junge Family Champions Center. Along with the Junge Center, the university added the Mortenson Family Plaza on the roof of the Junge Center. The outside walls were torn down and the concourse was expanded. A new grand entrance along with new boxes were expected to be ready by January 2013, but were completed just before the start of the 2012–13 Basketball season, much earlier than originally planned. The renovations also included renovations to the control room, updating the controllers for game stats and content for Michigan Stadium and the Crisler Center.

Part of the Crisler renovation also included the construction of the William Davidson Player Development Center. The $23.2 million facility boasts two full courts with ten baskets, a weight room, a sports medicine training room, and two identical wings for the men's and women's basketball offices.

== Tenants ==
Crisler Center has been the home of Michigan Wolverines men's basketball since its opening in 1967. The women's basketball team has been at Crisler Center since 1974. It has also been the home of Michigan's wrestling, women's volleyball and men's gymnastics teams. The gymnastics team hosted events at Crisler Center from 1978 to 1989. The wrestling team called Crisler Center its home from 1967 to 1989. The women's gymnastics team competed at Crisler Center from 1978 to 1989 before moving to Cliff Keen Arena in 1990 before ultimately returning to Crisler Center as their primary home in 2004.

== Gallery ==
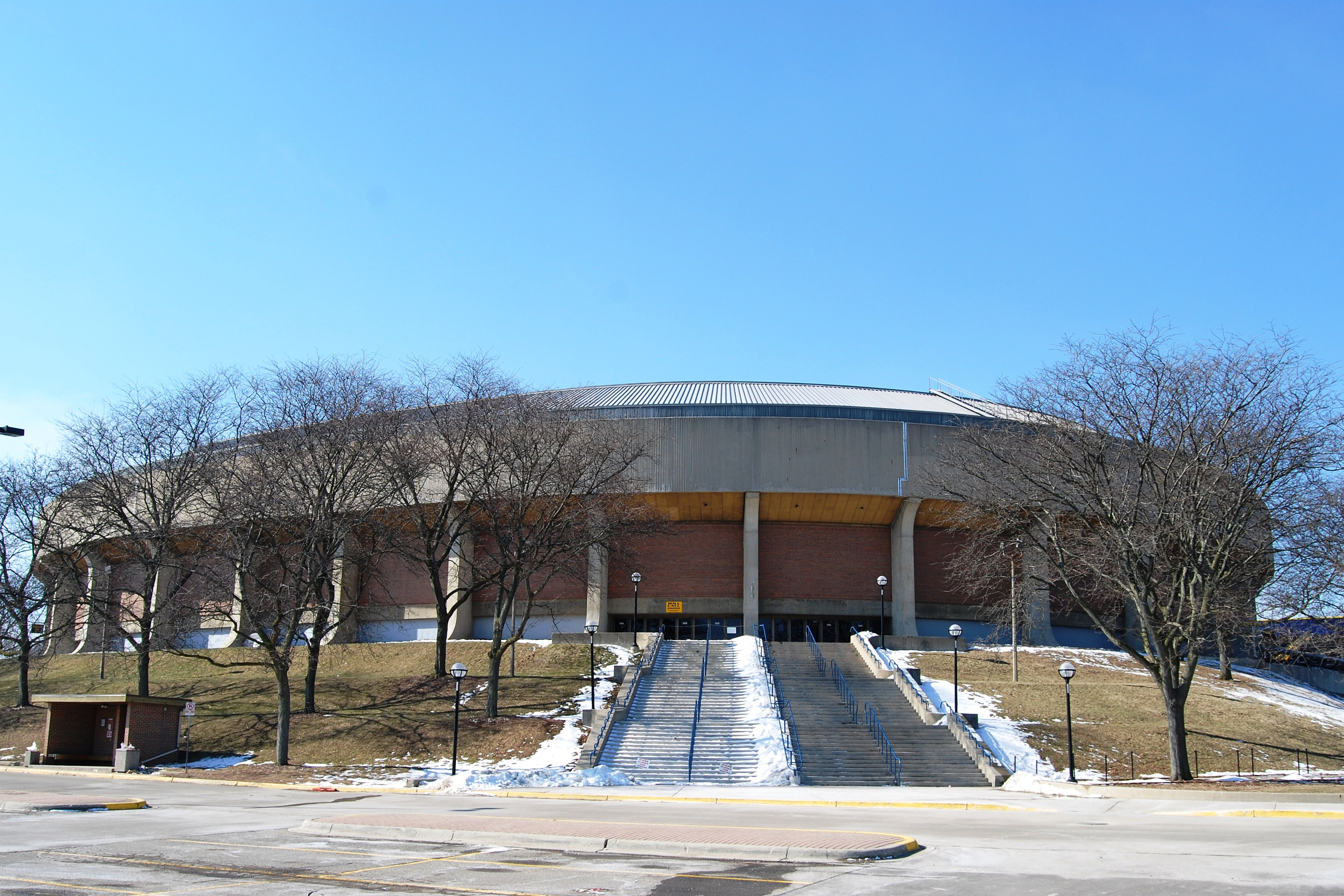
The exterior of Crisler Center

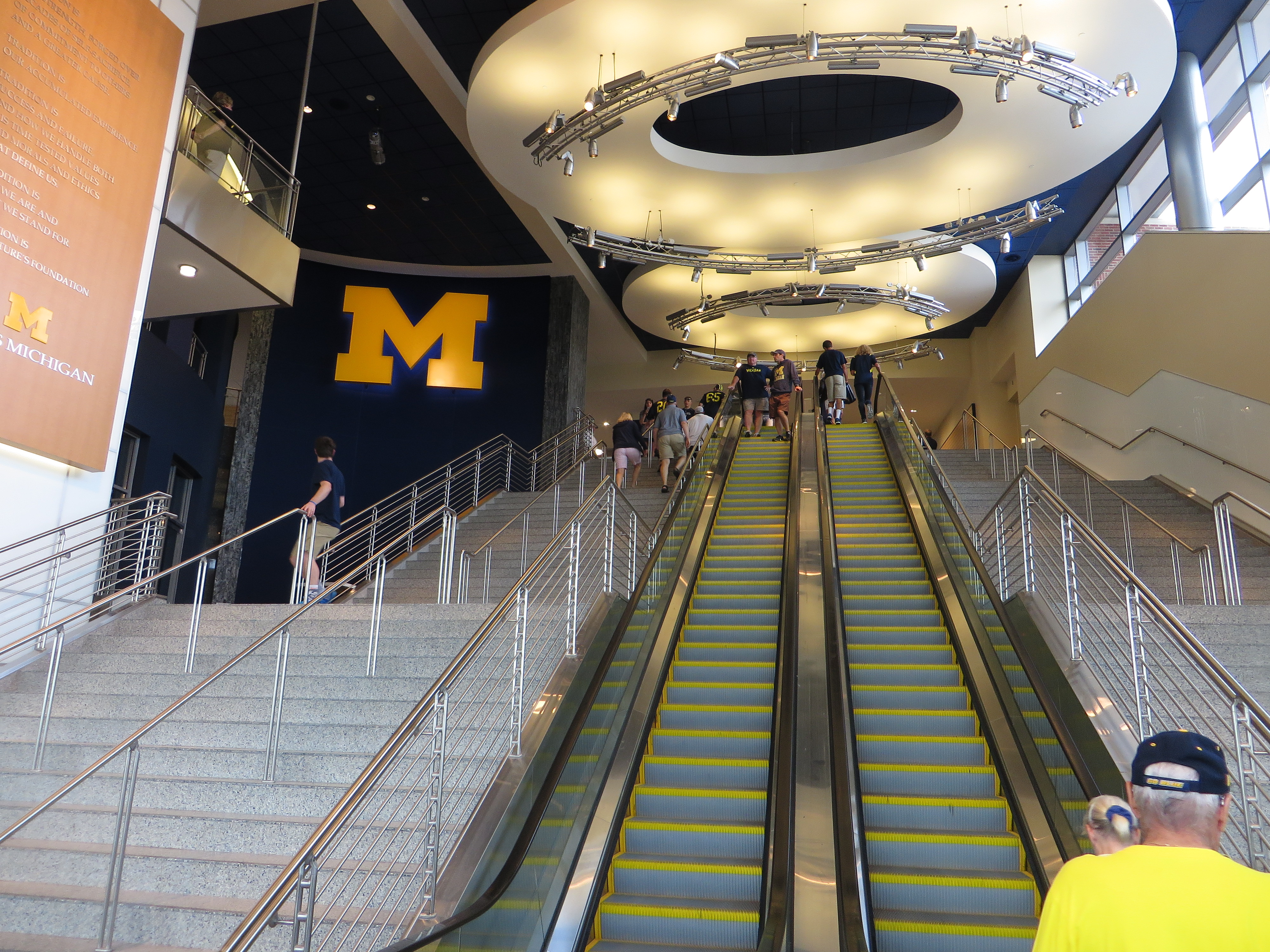
The interior of Crisler Center

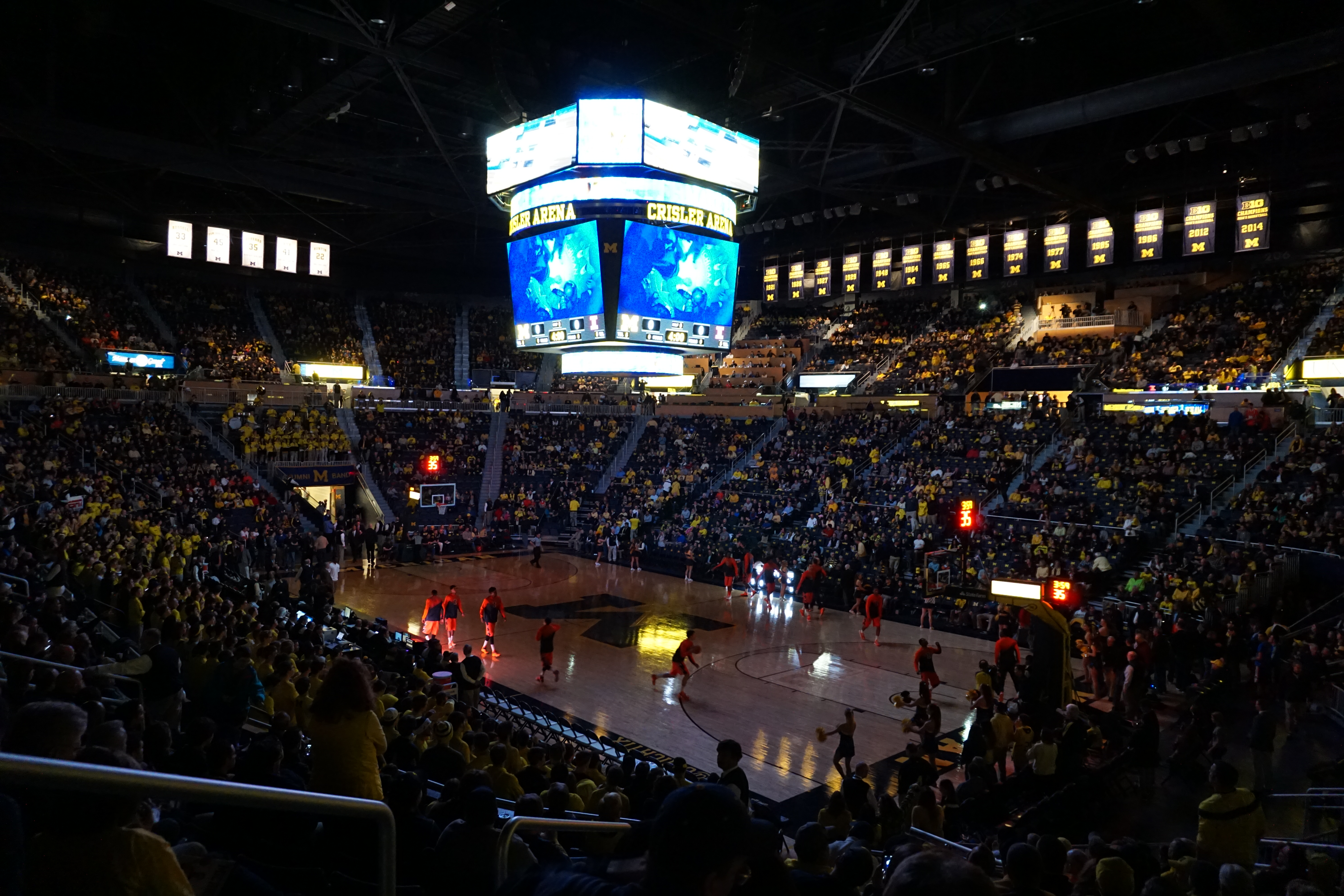
A basketball game at Crisler Center

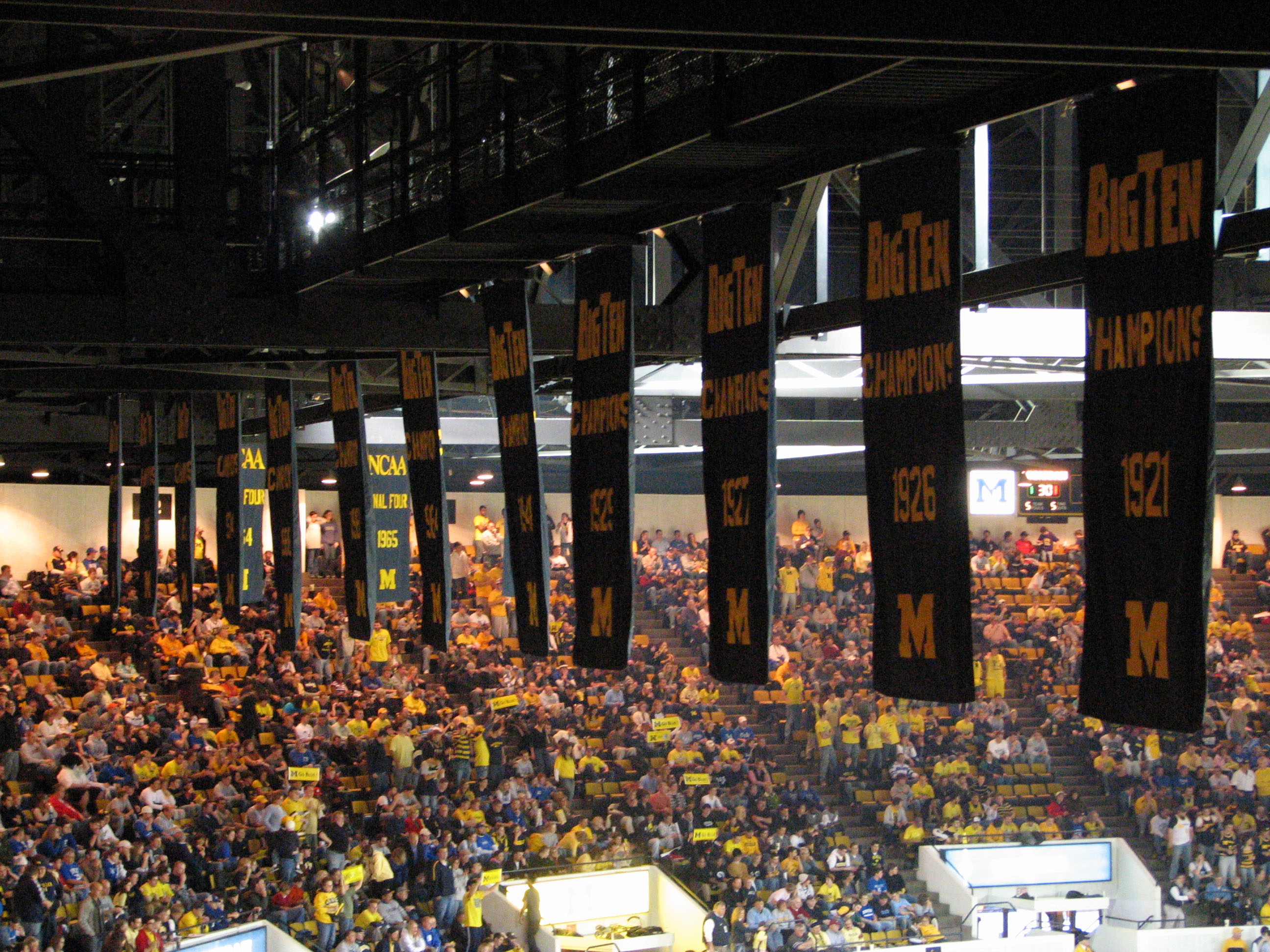
Championship banners

== See also ==
- List of NCAA Division I basketball arenas
