= Samantha Huge =

Current position
- Title: Athletic director

Biographical details
- Education: Gordon College, Campbell University

Playing career
- 1988–1992: Gordon

Administrative career (AD unless noted)
- 2000–2002: Illinois (Asst. Compliance Coordinator)
- 2002: Michigan State (Compliance Coordinator)
- 2002–2006: Wake Forest (Assistant AD)
- 2006–2009: Georgetown (Associate AD)
- 2009–2014: Delaware (Deputy AD)
- 2014–2017: Texas A&M (Associate AD)
- 2017–2020: William & Mary

Samantha K. Huge is the former director of athletics for the College of William & Mary where she served from 2017 to 2020. She previously served as an associate athletic director at Texas A&M University from 2014 to 2017, as a deputy athletic director at the University of Delaware from 2009 to 2014, as an associate athletic director at Georgetown University from 2006 to 2009, and as an assistant athletic director at Wake Forest University from 2002 to 2006. Huge attended college at Gordon College, where she played on the school's women's basketball team.
