= Mark McCormack =

American lawyer, sports agent, and writer (1930–2003)

- Born: Mark Hume McCormack; November 6, 1930; Chicago, Illinois, U.S.
- Died: May 16, 2003 (aged 72); New York City, U.S.
- Occupations: Lawyer; sports agent; writer; businessman
- Known for: Founder and president of IMG

Mark Hume McCormack (November 6, 1930 – May 16, 2003) was an American lawyer, sports agent and writer. He was the founder and chairman of International Management Group, now IMG, an international management organization serving sports figures and celebrities.

== Career ==
After his Army discharge, McCormack worked as an attorney at the Cleveland law firm, Arter & Hadden. In the 1950s he helped organize one-day golf exhibitions for professionals around the United States. In 1960, McCormack founded IMG.

McCormack is the author of several books, including The Terrible Truth About Lawyers and What They Don't Teach You at Harvard Business School, which spent 21 consecutive weeks at #1 on The New York Times Best Seller list. His annual publication The World of Professional Golf, first published in 1967, included an (unofficial) world ranking system. In his book What They Don't Teach You at Harvard Business School, McCormack tells a fictional story of a Harvard study in which the three percent of graduates who had clear, written goals earned ten times as much as the 97 percent who did not have clear, written goals. The myth is sometimes attributed to a fictional Yale study. McCormack and numerous motivational speakers, including Tony Robbins and Brian Tracy, have used various versions of this non-existent study in their presentations.

=== McCormack's world rankings ===
The system used to calculate Mark McCormack's world golf rankings was adapted in 1986 to become the Official World Golf Ranking system, with McCormack chairing the rankings committee made up of representatives from all the major golf tours. McCormack pioneered a similar system for tennis rankings.

== Personal life ==
McCormack met his second wife Betsy Nagelsen-McCormack, a two-time Australian Open doubles champion and a Wimbledon doubles finalist, while she was a business client. They married in 1986. The couple founded the McCormack–Nagelsen Tennis Center at the College of William & Mary, which houses the ITA Women's Collegiate Tennis Hall of Fame.

== Death and legacy ==
McCormack died at a New York hospital on May 16, 2003, age 72, from complications after suffering a cardiac event four months earlier that left him in a coma. The following year, the British film Wimbledon was dedicated to Mark McCormack by director Richard Loncraine.

McCormack was posthumously inducted into both the golf and tennis halls of fame. In July 2006, McCormack was selected for induction into the World Golf Hall of Fame in the lifetime achievement category. He was inducted in October. On January 23, 2008, he was also inducted into the International Tennis Hall of Fame.

== Awards and honors ==
- In 1990, he was named the "Most Powerful Man in Sports" by Sporting News.
- He was featured as one of the Forbes 400 Richest Americans three times: in 1995, 1998, 2001.
- In 1998, the Mark H. McCormack Award was established. It is awarded to the player who has spent the most weeks at first place in the Official World Golf Ranking during a calendar year.
- In 2006, McCormack was inducted into the World Golf Hall of Fame.
- In 2007, the Mark H. McCormack Medal was established. It is awarded to the leading player in the World Amateur Golf Ranking after the U.S. Amateur and the European Amateur.
- In 2008, McCormack was inducted into the International Tennis Hall of Fame.
- In 2010, the University of Massachusetts at Amherst named their Sport Management department after McCormack.

== Bibliography ==
- Arnie: The Evolution of a Legend, New York: Simon & Schuster (1967)
- What They Don't Teach You at Harvard Business School: Notes From A Street-Smart Executive, New York: Bantam (1984)
- The Terrible Truth About Lawyers: How Lawyers Really Work and How to Deal With Them Successfully, HarperCollins, 1987 (also published in another edition as What They Didn't Teach Me at Yale Law School, Fontana Press 1988)
- What They Still Don't Teach You at Harvard Business School, New York: Bantam Books, 1989 (also published in another edition as Success Secrets, HarperCollins, 1989)
- The 110% Solution, Villard Books, (1990)
- Hit the Ground Running: Executive Guide to Insider's Travel, Orion, 1993 (published in soft-cover edition as What They Don't Teach You at Harvard Business School About Executive Travel: Hit the Ground Running, Dove Books, 1996)
- McCormack on Negotiating, Random House (June 1995)
- McCormack on Selling, Random House Business Books (June 15, 1995)
- McCormack on Managing, Random House Business Books (October 1995)
- McCormack on Communicating, Dove Entertainment (February 1996)
- Getting Results for Dummies: Get Organized, Stay Focused, and Get Things Done!, IDG Books, (1999)
- Staying Street Smart in the Internet Age, Penguin Putnam, 2000 (also published in another edition as What You'll Never Learn on the Internet, HarperCollins Business, 2001, as well as Never Wrestle with a Pig and Ninety Other Ideas to Build Your Business and Career, Penguin, 2002)
- The World of Professional Golf (Published annually from 1967, it continues to be published posthumously, the title page indicating that it was founded by Mark McCormack). The first of the annuals was titled Golf '67.
