= Millie West Tennis Facility =

Sports facility at the College of William & Mary

Coordinates: 37.273558°N 76.721263°W

Millie West Tennis Center
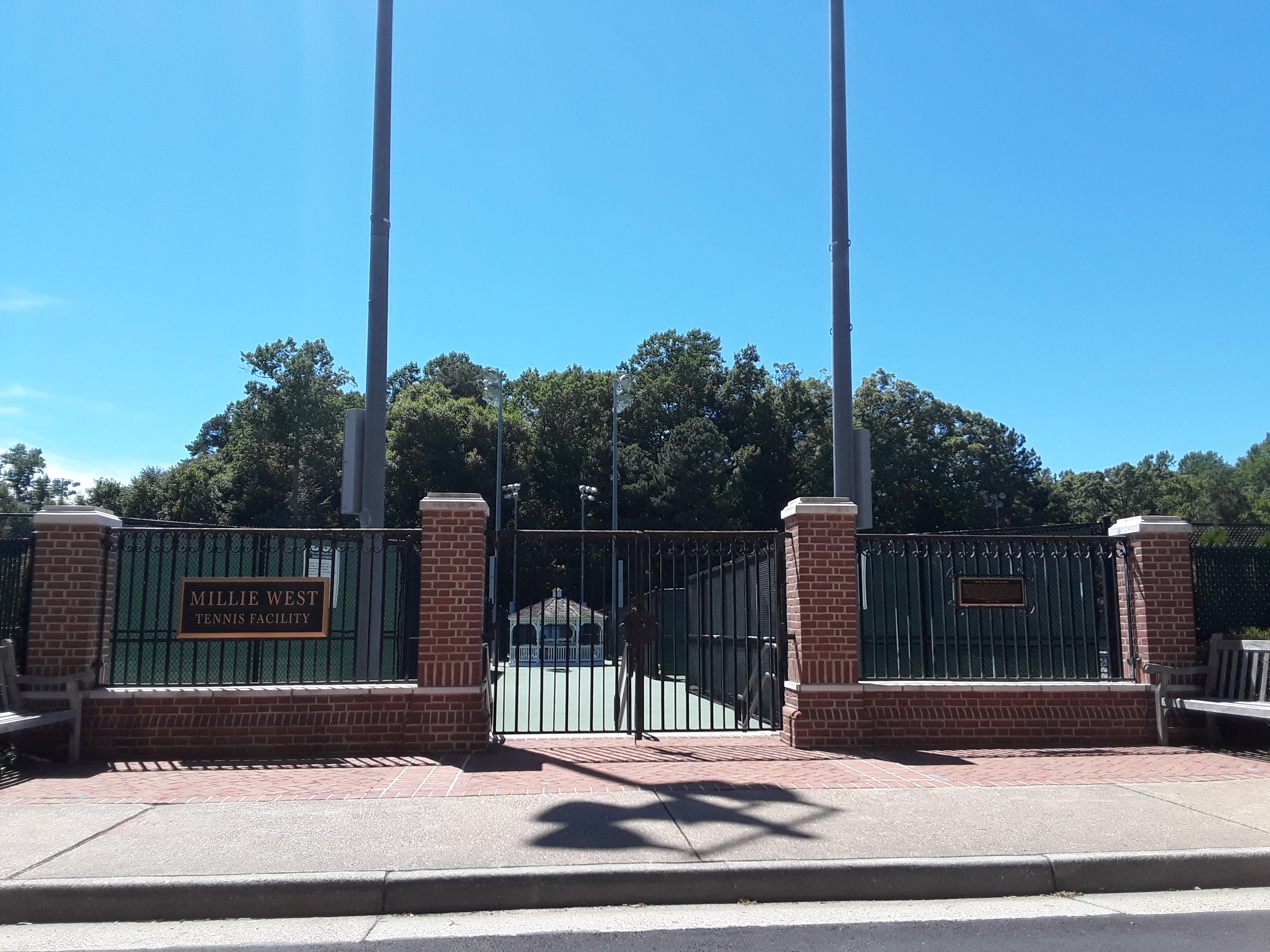
- Interactive map of Millie West Tennis Center
- Location: Williamsburg, VA
- Owner: College of William & Mary
- Operator: College of William & Mary
- Capacity: 500
- Surface: Hard court

Construction
- Architect: Local contractors

Tenant
- William & Mary Tribe Tennis

The Millie West Tennis Facility, formerly called the Busch Tennis Courts, are the tennis courts used by the College of William and Mary’s tennis teams during the outdoor season. The facility is named after Millie West, a contributor of over 50 years to William & Mary Athletics. The original name for the small stadium came from Anheuser-Busch, formerly the largest American brewer. Anheuser-Busch has a large presence in the Williamsburg area, including a brewery and the theme park Busch Gardens Williamsburg.

There are eight tennis courts all together, each one of them being a hard court. A unique feature to its design are the “California Corners”, which includes quarter fences that run along the sidelines to allow uninterrupted play.

== See also ==
- McCormack-Nagelsen Tennis Center
