= 1978 AIAW field hockey tournament =

1978 AIAW-USFHA field hockey tournament
Tournament details
- Host country: United States
- City: (Washington (state)) Ellensburg, Washington
- Dates: November 21–24, 1978
- Teams: 16
- Venue: Central Washington University

Final positions
- Champions: West Chester State (4th title)
- Runner-up: Delaware
- Third place: San Jose State

Tournament statistics
- Matches played: 27
- Goals scored: 93 (3.44 per match)

The 1978 AIAW-USFHA field hockey tournament was the fourth annual single-elimination tournament joint hosted by the Association for Intercollegiate Athletics for Women and the United States Field Hockey Association to determine the national champion of women's collegiate field hockey among their members in the United States, the culmination of the 1978 AIAW field hockey season.

== Bracket ==
=== Championship ===
First round
Central Washington	0
West Chester State	13
Oregon	1
Virginia	3
Dartmouth	1
Saint Louis	0
Arizona	0
San Jose State	3
Delaware	2
Long Beach State	0
Connecticut	4
Davis & Elkins	1
Massachusetts	4
Southern Illinois	3
Oklahoma State	0
Temple	2

Second round
West Chester State	2
Virginia	1
Dartmouth	0
San Jose State	2
Delaware	1
Connecticut	0
Massachusetts	1
Temple	0

Semifinals
West Chester State	1
San Jose State	0
Delaware	2
Massachusetts	0

Championship
West Chester State	3
Delaware	0
Third place
San Jose State	2
Massachusetts	0

=== Consolation ===
Consolation first round
Long Beach State	5
Davis & Elkins	2
Southern Illinois	5
Oklahoma State	0
Central Washington	0
Oregon	4
Saint Louis	4
Arizona	0

Consolation quarterfinals
Virginia	0
Long Beach State	1
Southern Illinois	2
Dartmouth	1
Connecticut	0
Oregon	1
Saint Louis	4
Temple	3

Consolation semifinals
Long Beach State	0
Southern Illinois	4
Oregon	0
Saint Louis	2

Fifth place
Southern Illinois	1
Saint Louis	2

- † indicates team won on penetration time
