= 1970 NCAA University Division cross country championships =

1970 cross-country running meet of the NCAA (University Division)

1970 NCAA University Division Men's Cross Country Championships
- Organisers: NCAA
- Edition: 32nd
- Date: November 23, 1970
- Host city: (Virginia) Williamsburg, VA; College of William & Mary
- Venue: Eastern State Hospital
- Distances: 6 miles (9.7 km)
- Participation: 307 athletes

The 1970 NCAA University Division Men's Cross Country Championships were the 32nd annual cross country meet to determine the team and individual national champions of men's collegiate cross country running in the United States. Held on November 23, 1970, the meet was hosted by the College of William & Mary on the grounds of the Eastern State Hospital in Williamsburg, Virginia. The distance for this race was 6 miles (9.7 kilometers).

All NCAA University Division members were eligible to qualify for the meet. In total, 39 teams and 307 individual runners contested this championship.

The team national championship was again won by the Villanova Wildcats, their fourth title. The individual championship was won by Steve Prefontaine, from Oregon, with a time of 28:00.2. Prefontaine's time broke the event distance record, set the previous year by Gerry Lindgren. With the distance for the NCAA championships changing to 10,000 meters in 1976, his distance record would remain unbroken.

Oregon was initially declared the team champion, but the title was later given to Villanova after video evidence placed their runner Les Nagy in 62nd rather than 67th place as originally recorded.

== Men's title ==
- Distance: 6 miles (9.7 kilometers)

=== Individual Result (Top 10) ===
Rank	Individual	School	Time
1st place, gold medalist(s)	Steve Prefontaine	Oregon	28:00.2
2nd place, silver medalist(s)	Donald Walsh	Villanova	28:08
3rd place, bronze medalist(s)	Donald Kardong	Stanford	28:10
4	Gregory Fredericks	Penn St	28:12
5	John Bednarski	UTEP	28:14
6	Keith Munson	Oregon St	28:22
7	Bob Bertelson	Ohio	28:28
8	Sidney Sink	Bowling Green	28:30
9	Marty Liquori	Villanova	28:37
10	Scott Bringhurst	Utah	28:40

=== Team Result (Top 10) ===
Rank	Team	Points
1st place, gold medalist(s)	Villanova	85
2nd place, silver medalist(s)	Oregon	86
3rd place, bronze medalist(s)	UTEP	124
4	Indiana	195
5	Western Michigan	214
6	Missouri	237
7	Michigan State	248
8	Bowling Green	324
9	San Diego State	356
10	William & Mary	366

== See also ==
- NCAA Men's Division II Cross Country Championship
