= McCormack–Nagelsen Tennis Center =

Sports facility in Virginia, US

Coordinates: 37.2619585°N 76.7045689°W

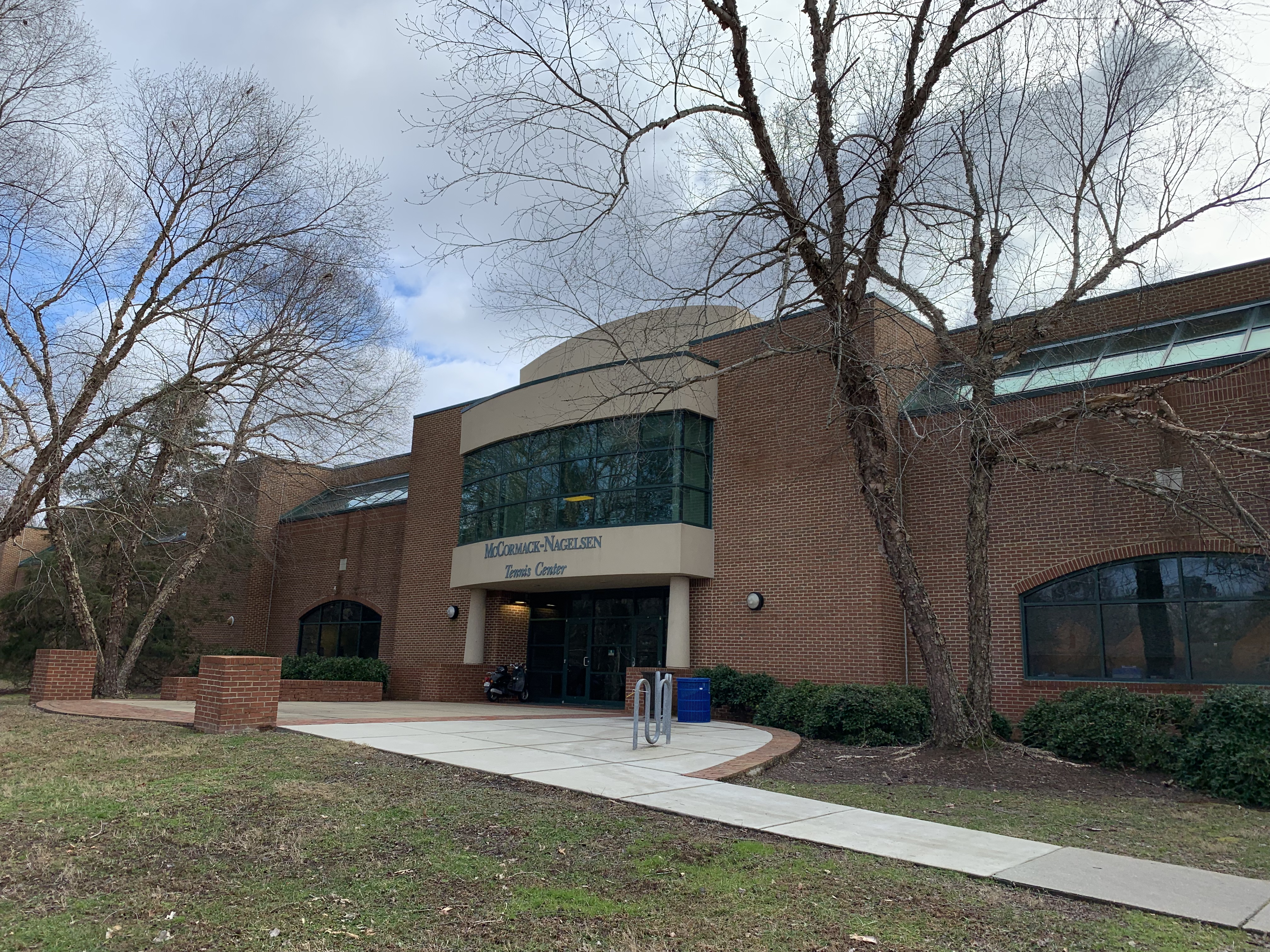
- Front entrance to the McCormack-Nagelsen Tennis Center, 2019
- Interactive map of McCormack–Nagelsen Tennis Center
- Location: Williamsburg, VA
- Owner: College of William and Mary
- Operator: William and Mary Sports

Construction
- Opened: April 3, 1995
- Cost: $3,000,000

Tenants
- College of William and Mary Tribe tennis (1995-present)

The McCormack–Nagelsen Tennis Center (MNTC) is a $3,000,000, 6,400-square-foot (590 m^{2}) facility that is home to the College of William & Mary’s women's tennis team as well as the Intercollegiate Tennis Association’s Women's Tennis Hall of Fame. It is located in Williamsburg, Virginia. The facility includes six indoor courts and stadium seating. The center was named after College alumnus Mark McCormack (Class of 1951) and his wife, retired professional tennis player Betsy Nagelsen. In 1995, the year the MNTC opened, it won an USTA Outstanding Facility Award for a collegiate facility.

== See also ==
- Busch Tennis Courts
