= 1998 NCAA Division I cross country championships =

1998 cross-country running meet of the NCAA (Division I)

1998 NCAA Division I Cross Country Championships
- Organisers: NCAA
- Edition: 60th–Men; 18th–Women
- Date: November 23, 1998
- Host city: (Kansas) Lawrence, KS
- Venue: University of Kansas; Rim Rock Farm
- Distances: 10 km–Men; 5 km–Women
- Participation: 247–Men; 254–Women; 501–Total athletes

The 1998 NCAA Division I Cross Country Championships were the 60th annual NCAA Men's Division I Cross Country Championship and the 18th annual NCAA Women's Division I Cross Country Championship to determine the team and individual national champions of NCAA Division I men's and women's collegiate cross country running in the United States. In all, four different titles were contested: men's and women's individual and team championships.

Held on November 23, 1998, the combined meet was hosted by the University of Kansas at Rim Rock Farm in Lawrence, Kansas. The distance for the men's race was 10 kilometers (6.21 miles) while the distance for the women's race was 5 kilometers (3.11 miles).

The men's team championship was won by Arkansas (97 points), the Razorbacks' ninth overall. The women's team championship was won by Villanova (106 points), the Wildcats' seventh (and first since winning six consecutive between 1989 and 1994).

The two individual champions were, for the men, Adam Goucher (Colorado, 29:26) and, for the women, Katie McGregor (Michigan, 16:47).

== Men's title ==
- Distance: 10,000 meters

=== Men's Team Result (Top 10) ===
Rank	Team	Points
1st place, gold medalist(s)	Arkansas	97
2nd place, silver medalist(s)	Stanford	114
3rd place, bronze medalist(s)	Colorado	158
4	Michigan	183
5	Oregon	233
6	Wisconsin	246
7	Northern Arizona	295
8	NC State	311
9	James Madison	320
10	Providence	339

=== Men's Individual Result (Top 10) ===
Rank	Name	Team	Time
1st place, gold medalist(s)	(United States) Adam Goucher	Colorado	29:26
2nd place, silver medalist(s)	(United States) Abdi Abdirahman	Arizona	29:49
3rd place, bronze medalist(s)	(Kenya) Julius Mwangi	Butler University	30:00
4	(United States) Matthew Downin	Wisconsin	30:00
5	(Canada) Sean Kaley	Arkansas	30:12
6	(United States) Brad Hauser	Stanford	30:18
7	(Kenya) Bernard Lagat	Washington State	30:20
8	(United States) Jeff Simonich	Utah	30:22
9	(United States) Jonathon Riley	Stanford	30:31
10	(United States) Todd Snyder	Michigan	30:34

== Women's title ==
- Distance: 5,000 meters

=== Women's Team Result (Top 10) ===
Rank	Team	Points
1st place, gold medalist(s)	Villanova	106
2nd place, silver medalist(s)	Brigham Young	110
3rd place, bronze medalist(s)	Stanford	111
4	Georgetown	199
5	Wisconsin	233
6	Arkansas	311
7	Colorado	332
8	Baylor	351
9	Washington	363
10	William and Mary	374

=== Women's Individual Result (Top 10) ===
Rank	Name	Team	Time
1st place, gold medalist(s)	(United States) Katie McGregor	Michigan	16:47
2nd place, silver medalist(s)	(United States) Amy Skieresz	Arizona	16:53
3rd place, bronze medalist(s)	(United States) Amy Yoder	Arkansas	17:03
4	(United States) Kristen Gordon	Georgetown	17:09
5	(United States) Sally Glynn	Stanford	17:09
6	(United States) Julia Stamps	Stanford	17:11
7	(Hong Kong) Maggie Chan Man Yee	BYU	17:14
8	(Ecuador) Marie-Elena Calle	Virginia Commonwealth	17:14
9	(United States) Marie Davis	Oregon	17:16
10	(United States) Jessica Koch	Arkansas	17:16
