= 1976 AIAW field hockey tournament =

1976 AIAW-USFHA field hockey tournament
Tournament details
- Host country: United States
- City: West Chester, Pennsylvania
- Dates: November 24–28, 1976
- Teams: 16

Final positions
- Champions: West Chester State (2nd title)
- Runner-up: Ursinus
- Third place: Lock Haven State

Tournament statistics
- Matches played: 27
- Goals scored: 101 (3.74 per match)

The 1976 AIAW-USFHA field hockey tournament was the second annual single-elimination tournament joint hosted by the Association for Intercollegiate Athletics for Women and the United States Field Hockey Association to determine the national champion of women's collegiate field hockey among their members in the United States, the culmination of the 1976 AIAW field hockey season.

== Bracket ==
=== Championship ===
First round
BYU	0
West Chester State	4
Colorado	2
Southern Connecticut	1
Lock Haven State	1
Central Missouri State	0
William & Mary	5
Stanford	1
Delaware	1†
Springfield	1
Virginia	3
Central Michigan	1
Bemidji State	0
Ohio State	2
Oregon	0
Ursinus	10

Second round
West Chester State	7
Colorado	0
Lock Haven State	2
William & Mary	0
Delaware	2†
Virginia	2
Ohio State	0
Ursinus	5

Semifinals
West Chester State	1†
Lock Haven State	1
Delaware	0
Ursinus	5

Championship
West Chester State	2
Ursinus	0
Third place
Lock Haven State	2
Delaware	0

=== Consolation ===
Consolation first round
BYU	1
Southern Connecticut	3
Central Missouri State	2
Stanford	0
Springfield	3
Central Michigan	3†
Bemidji State	2†
Oregon	2

Consolation quarterfinals
Virginia	1
Southern Connecticut	2
Central Missouri State	2
Ohio State	0
Colorado	1
Central Michigan	4
Bemidji State	3
William & Mary	2

Consolation semifinals
Southern Connecticut	2
Central Missouri State	0
Central Michigan	3†
Bemidji State	3

Fifth place
Southern Connecticut	1
Central Michigan	3

- † indicates team won on penetration time
