= 1975 AIAW field hockey tournament =

Tournament details
- Host country: United States
- City: Harrisonburg, Virginia
- Dates: November 27–30, 1975
- Teams: 16

Final positions
- Champions: West Chester State (1st title)
- Runner-up: Ursinus
- Third place: Springfield

Tournament statistics
- Matches played: 25
- Goals scored: 111 (4.44 per match)

The 1975 AIAW-USFHA field hockey tournament was the first annual single-elimination tournament joint hosted by the Association for Intercollegiate Athletics for Women and the United States Field Hockey Association to determine the national champion of women's collegiate field hockey among their members in the United States, the culmination of the 1975 AIAW field hockey season.

== Bracket ==
=== Championship ===
First round
West Chester State	5
Madison College	0
Longwood	3
San Jose State	0
Central Michigan	3
Northern Colorado	1
Central Missouri State
Springfield	w/o
Stanford	1
William & Mary	5
Lock Haven State	5
Wooster	0
Bemidji State	1
Maine	3
Oregon	1
Ursinus	2

Second round
West Chester State	4
Longwood	1
Central Michigan	0
Springfield	4
William & Mary	2
Lock Haven State	1
Maine	1
Ursinus	6

Semifinals
West Chester State	5
Springfield	1
William & Mary	0
Ursinus	4

Championship
West Chester State	4**
Ursinus	3
Third place
Springfield	3
William & Mary	0

=== Consolation ===
Consolation first round
Madison College	3
San Jose State	1
Central Missouri State
Northern Colorado	w/o
Woooster	3
Stanford	1
Bemidji State	1
Oregon	0

Consolation quarterfinals
Lock Haven State	2
Madison College	1
Northern Colorado	2
Maine	1
Longwood	3
Wooster	2
Bemidji State	4
Central Michigan	2

Consolation semifinals
Lock Haven State	6
Northern Colorado	0
Longwood	1†
Bemidji State	1

Fifth place
Lock Haven State	7
Longwood	1
