= Notre Dame Fighting Irish women's cross country =

- University: University of Notre Dame
- Athletic director: Pete Bevacqua
- Head coach: Matt Sparks (7th season)
- Conference: ACC
- Location: Notre Dame, IN
- Nickname: Fighting Irish
- Colors: Blue and gold

NCAA Championship appearances
- 1993, 1999, 2001, 2002, 2003, 2004, 2005, 2008, 2009, 2011, 2012, 2013, 2014, 2015, 2016, 2018, 2019, 2021, 2022, 2023

Conference champions
- 1990, 1993, 1994, 2002, 2003, 2005

Notre Dame Fighting Irish women's cross country is one of the cross country team of the University of Notre Dame in Notre Dame, Indiana The Fighting Irish compete in the Atlantic Coast Conference at the Division I level in the NCAA and are head coached by Matt Sparks.

== Championship results ==
Year	Coach	Place	Points
2023	Matt Sparks	4th	237
2022	Matt Sparks	7th	261
2021	Matt Sparks	5th	215
2019	Matt Sparks	15th	415
2018	Matt Sparks	8th	313
2016	Alan Turner	11th	338
2015	Alan Turner	8th	276
2014	Alan Turner	29th	609
2013	Joe Piane	29th	688
2012	Joe Piane	15th	394
2011	Joe Piane	22nd	512
2009	Joe Piane	23rd	519
2008	Joe Piane	29th	689
2005	Joe Piane	7th	252
2004	Joe Piane	4th	170
2003	Joe Piane	10th	352
2002	Joe Piane	3rd	170
2001	Joe Piane	19th	504
1999	Joe Piane	29th	626
1993	Joe Piane	15th	331

== Coaches ==
Coach	Tenure
Matt Sparks	2018–Present
Alan Turner	2014-2018
Joe Piane	1974-2014
Don Faley	1972-1974
Alex Wilson	1950-1972
ER "Doc" Handy	1942-1950
William Mahoney	1940-1942
John Nicholson	1927-1940
Knute Rockne	1916-1927
No Coach	1890-1916
