= 1977 AIAW field hockey tournament =

1977 AIAW-USFHA field hockey tournament
Tournament details
- Host country: United States
- City: Denver, Colorado
- Dates: November 23–26, 1977
- Teams: 16

Final positions
- Champions: West Chester State (3rd title)
- Runner-up: Ursinus
- Third place: Delaware

Tournament statistics
- Matches played: 27
- Goals scored: 87 (3.22 per match)

The 1977 AIAW-USFHA field hockey tournament was the third annual single-elimination tournament joint hosted by the Association for Intercollegiate Athletics for Women and the United States Field Hockey Association to determine the national champion of women's collegiate field hockey among their members in the United States, the culmination of the 1977 AIAW field hockey season.

== Bracket ==
=== Championship ===
First round
Oregon	0
West Chester State	6
James Madison	2
SW Missouri State	3
Arizona	1
Central Michigan	2
Delaware	2
Massachusetts	0
Lock Haven State	0
San Jose State	1
Colorado	0
Connecticut	3
Bemidji State	2
Southern Illinois	0
Oklahoma	0
Ursinus	5

Second round
West Chester State	1
SW Missouri State	0
Central Michigan	1
Delaware	3
San Jose State	1
Connecticut	0
Bemidji State	0
Ursinus	2

Semifinals
West Chester State	2
Delaware	0
San Jose State	0
Ursinus	2

Championship
West Chester State	1
Ursinus	0
Third place
Delaware	3
San Jose State	0

=== Consolation ===
Consolation first round
Lock Haven State	7
Colorado	0
Southern Illinois	2
Oklahoma	3
Oregon	0
James Madison	5
Arizona	1
Massachusetts	4

Consolation quarterfinals
SW Missouri State	2
Lock Haven State	5
Oklahoma	0
Central Michigan	1
Connecticut	2
James Madison	1
Massachusetts	4
Bemidji State	1

Consolation semifinals
Lock Haven State	2
Central Michigan	0
Connecticut	1
Massachusetts	0

Fifth place
Lock Haven State	2
Connecticut	1

- † indicates team won on penetration time
