= Rim Rock Farm =

Cross country running course in Lawrence, Kansas

Coordinates: 39.0788°N 95.2627°W

Rim Rock Farm is an American historic cross country running course. The cross country course is renowned for its two covered bridges as part of the course. The course is located at 2276 Burnett Lane, Lawrence, Kansas.

== Endowed ==
Former head track and field and cross country coach Bob Timmons donated the property to the University of Kansas in 2004. Coach Timmons owned the farm and hosted meets on the site since 1974. Rim Rock Farm also features specific hills, turns and other landmarks that are named after former Jayhawk greats.

== Historic ==
The 1965 NCAA Division I Men's Cross Country Championships were the 27th annual cross country meet to determine the team and individual national champions of men's collegiate cross country running in the United States. Held on November 22, 1965, the meet was hosted by the University of Kansas at Rim Rock Farm in Lawrence, Kansas. This was the first meet not held at Michigan State. The distance for this race was extended to 6 miles (9.7 kilometers).

The 1966 NCAA Division I Men's Cross Country Championships were the 28th annual cross country meet to determine the team and individual national champions of men's collegiate cross country running in the United States. Held on November 21, 1966, the meet was hosted for the second straight year by the University of Kansas at Rim Rock Farm in Lawrence, Kansas. The distance for this race was 6 miles (9.7 kilometers).

The 1998 NCAA Division I cross country championships were held at Rim Rock Farm on November 23, 1998. The distance for the men's championship was 10 kilometers (6.21 miles) and the distance for the women's championship was 5 kilometers (3.11 miles).

== Championship ==
In the fall of 2006, 2014, 2020, and 2025 Rim Rock Farm played host to its first Big 12 Conference Cross Country Conference Championships. Rim Rock Farm hosted the Big Eight Cross Country Championships in 1983, 1991 and 1995 and was also the site of the 1998 NCAA Division I and II Cross Country Championships as well as numerous Kansas high school state meets.
