= 2003 NCAA Division I cross country championships =

2003 cross-country running meet of the NCAA (Division I)

2003 NCAA Division I Cross Country Championships
- Organisers: NCAA
- Edition: 65th–Men; 23rd–Women
- Date: November 24, 2003
- Host city: (Iowa) Waterloo, IA
- Venue: Irv Warren Golf Course
- Distances: 10 km–Men; 6 km–Women
- Participation: 254–Men; 252–Women; 506–Total athletes

The 2003 NCAA Division I Cross Country Championships were the 65th annual NCAA Men's Division I Cross Country Championship and the 23rd annual NCAA Women's Division I Cross Country Championship to determine the team and individual national champions of NCAA Division I men's and women's collegiate cross country running in the United States. In all, four different titles were contested: men's and women's individual and team championships.

Held on November 24, 2003, the combined meet was hosted by the University of Northern Iowa at Irv Warren Golf Course in Waterloo, Iowa, near UNI's campus in Cedar Falls. The distance for the men's race was 10 kilometers (6.21 miles) while the distance for the women's race was 6 kilometers (3.73 miles).

The men's team championship was again won by Stanford (24 points), the Cardinal's second consecutive and fourth overall. This was the second best score in NCAA history and the lowest by a team of entirely American runners. UTEP's 17 point win in 1981 was accomplished with a team of African runners. Stanford placed 6 runners in the top 13 places. The women's team championship was also won by Stanford (120 points), the Cardinal's second and first since 1996. This was the third time that the same university won both team titles; Stanford accomplished this feat in 1996 and Wisconsin captured both in 1985.

The two individual champions were, for the men, Dathan Ritzenhein (Colorado, 29:14.1) and, for the women, Shalane Flanagan (North Carolina, 19:30.4). It was Flanagan's second consecutive title.

== Men's title ==
- Distance: 10,000 meters

=== Men's Team Result (Top 10) ===
Rank	Team	Points
1st place, gold medalist(s)	Stanford	24
2nd place, silver medalist(s)	Wisconsin	174
3rd place, bronze medalist(s)	Northern Arizona	190
4	Iona	191
5	Arkansas	215
6	Colorado	261
7	Georgetown	283
8	Air Force	330
9	Michigan	335
10	NC State	346

=== Men's Individual Result (Top 10) ===
Rank	Name	Team	Time
1st place, gold medalist(s)	(United States) Dathan Ritzenhein	Colorado	29:14.1
2nd place, silver medalist(s)	(United States) Ryan Hall	Stanford	29:15.4
3rd place, bronze medalist(s)	(United Kingdom) Gavin Thompson	Eastern Michigan	29:17.4
4	(United States) Grant Robison	Stanford	29:19.2
5	(United States) Ian Dobson	Stanford	29:24.7
6	(United States) Louis Luchini	Stanford	29:28.2
7	(United States) Westly Keating	Texas–Pan American	29:30.4
8	(Republic of Ireland) Alistair Cragg	Arkansas	29:33.1
9	(Canada) Simon Bairu	Wisconsin	29:33.8
10	(Sweden) Henrik Ahnstrom	Northern Arizona	29:41.6

== Women's title ==
- Distance: 6,000 meters

=== Women's Team Result (Top 10) ===
Rank	Team	Points
1st place, gold medalist(s)	Stanford	120
2nd place, silver medalist(s)	BYU	128
3rd place, bronze medalist(s)	Providence	222
4	Michigan	232
5	Colorado	269
6	NC State	290
7	UCLA	293
8	North Carolina	294
9	Princeton	348
10	Notre Dame	352

=== Women's Individual Result (Top 10) ===
Rank	Name	Team	Time
1st place, gold medalist(s)	(United States) Shalane Flanagan	North Carolina	19:30.4
2nd place, silver medalist(s)	(New Zealand) Kim Smith	Providence	19:42.7
3rd place, bronze medalist(s)	(United States) Sara Bei	Stanford	19:49.1
4	(Czech Republic) Michaela Mannova	BYU	19:52.2
5	(Republic of Ireland) Mary Cullen	Providence	19:53.0
6	(United States) Alicia Craig	Stanford	19:55.0
7	(Canada) Carol Henry	North Carolina	19:59.3
8	(Canada) Emily Kroshus	Princeton	20:03.9
9	(Sweden) Ida Nilsson	Northern Arizona	20:05.5
10	(Sweden) Johanna Nilsson	Northern Arizona	20:07.0
