= 2004 NCAA Division I cross country championships =

2004 cross-country running meet of the NCAA (Division I)

2004 NCAA Division I Cross Country Championships
- Organisers: NCAA
- Edition: 66th–Men; 24th–Women
- Date: November 22, 2004
- Host city: (Indiana) Terre Haute, IN
- Venue: Indiana State University; LaVern Gibson Championship Cross Country Course
- Distances: 10 km–Men; 6 km–Women
- Participation: 242–Men; 250–Women; 492–Total athletes

The 2004 NCAA Division I Cross Country Championships were the 66th annual NCAA Men's Division I Cross Country Championship and the 24th annual NCAA Women's Division I Cross Country Championship to determine the team and individual national champions of NCAA Division I men's and women's collegiate cross country running in the United States. In all, four different titles were contested: men's and women's individual and team championships.

Held on November 22, 2004, the combined meet was the first of eight consecutive championship meets hosted by Indiana State University at the LaVern Gibson Championship Cross Country Course in Terre Haute, Indiana. The distance for the men's race was 10 kilometers (6.21 miles) while the distance for the women's race was 6 kilometers (3.73 miles).

The men's team championship was won by Colorado (90 points), the Buffaloes' second. The women's team championship was also won by Colorado (63 points), the Buffaloes' second. This was the fourth time that the same program won both the men's and women's national team titles (Stanford, 2003; Stanford, 1996; Wisconsin, 1985).

The two individual champions were, for the men, Simon Bairu (Wisconsin, 30:37.7) and, for the women, Kim Smith (Providence, 20:28.5).

== Men's title ==
- Distance: 10,000 meters

=== Men's Team Result (Top 10) ===
Rank	Team	Points
1st place, gold medalist(s)	Colorado	90
2nd place, silver medalist(s)	Wisconsin	94
3rd place, bronze medalist(s)	Arkansas	202
4	Butler Bulldogs	243
5	BYU	267
6	Stanford	269
7	Iona	279
8	Arizona State	315
9	New Mexico	330
10	Cal Poly–San Luis Obispo	333

=== Men's Individual Result (Top 10) ===
Rank	Name	Team	Time
1st place, gold medalist(s)	(Canada) Simon Bairu	Wisconsin	30:37.7
2nd place, silver medalist(s)	(United States) Matt Gonzales	New Mexico	30:40.9
3rd place, bronze medalist(s)	(United States) Josphat Boit	Arkansas	30:41.8
4	(United States) Brent Vaughn	Colorado	30:48.7
5	(United States) Bret Schoolmeester	Colorado	30:56.3
6	(Kenya) Simon Ngata	Georgia	30:56.5
7	(Kenya) Benson Chesang	Kansas	30:59.4
8	(United States) Nef Araia	Stanford	31:04.5
9	(United States) Robert Cheseret	Arizona	31:05.8
10	(United States) Rod Koborsi	Georgetown	31:06.4

== Women's title ==
- Distance: 6,000 meters

=== Women's Team Result (Top 10) ===
Rank	Team	Points
1st place, gold medalist(s)	Colorado	63
2nd place, silver medalist(s)	Duke	144
3rd place, bronze medalist(s)	Providence	164
4	Notre Dame	170
5	Stanford	175
6	Michigan	246
7	Villanova	277
8	Brigham Young	293
9	Arizona State	333
10	North Carolina	336

=== Women's Individual Result (Top 10) ===
Rank	Name	Team	Time
1st place, gold medalist(s)	(New Zealand) Kim Smith	Providence	20:08.5
2nd place, silver medalist(s)	(United States) Renee Metivier	Colorado	20:26.4
3rd place, bronze medalist(s)	(United States) Caroline Bierbaum	Columbia-Barnard	20:30.7
4	(United States) Laura Turner	BYU	20:37.5
5	(United States) Maureen Mccandless	Pittsburgh	20:38.2
6	(United States) Lindsay Donaldson	Yale	20:40.0
7	(Canada) Carol Henry	North Carolina	20:41.9
8	(Serbia) Marina Muncan	Villanova	20:42.8
9	(United States) Angela Homan	Auburn	20:43.8
10	(New Zealand) Fiona Crombie	Providence	20:45.9
