= Michigan Wolverines men's cross country =

- University: University of Michigan
- Head coach: Kevin Sullivan (10th season)
- Conference: Big Ten
- Location: Ann Arbor, Michigan, US
- Nickname: Wolverines
- Colors: Maize and blue

NCAA Championship appearances
- 1974, 1975, 1976, 1978, 1979, 1980, 1982, 1983, 1984, 1988, 1990, 1991, 1992, 1993, 1994, 1995, 1996, 1997, 1998, 1999, 2001, 2002, 2003, 2004, 2007, 2008, 2011, 2012, 2013, 2014, 2015, 2017, 2018, 2019, 2021, 2022, 2023

Conference champions
- 1922, 1954, 1974, 1975, 1976, 1980, 1993, 1997, 1998, 2015, 2017

Michigan Wolverines men's cross country is one of the cross country team of the University of Michigan in Ann Arbor, Michigan. The Wolverines compete in the Big Ten Conference at the Division I level in the NCAA and are head coached by Kevin Sullivan.
