= Madie Boreman =

American steeplechaser (born 1998)

Personal information
- Born: Madison Boreman; 10 July 1998 (28 years, 23 days old) Fort Hood, Texas
- Home town: Round Rock, Austin, Texas
- Education: Rouse High School; University of Colorado Boulder
- Agent: Isaya Okwiya
- Height: 173 cm (5 ft 8 in)
- Weight: 57 kg (126 lb)

Sport
- Sport: Sport of athletics
- Events: 2000 metres steeplechase 3000 metres steeplechase
- College team: Colorado Buffaloes
- Coached by: Juli Benson

Achievements and titles
- National finals: 2015 USA U18s; • 2000m s'chase, 2nd (silver); 2017 NCAAs; • 3000m s'chase, 2nd (silver); 2017 NCAA XC; • 6km XC, 62nd; 2021 NCAA XC; • 6km XC, 74th; 2021 NCAA XC; • 6km XC, 96th; 2022 NCAA Indoors; • Mile run, 8th; 2022 NCAAs; • 3000m s'chase, 4th; 2022 USA Champs; • 3000m s'chase, 9th; 2023 USA Champs; • 3000m s'chase, 11th
- Personal bests: 2000mSC: 6:09.81 AR (2023) 3000mSC: 9:22.99 (2023)
- Updated on 4 April 2024

Madie Boreman (born 10 July 1998) is an American steeplechase runner. She is the North American record-holder at the 2000 metres steeplechase and was the winner of the 3000 metres steeplechase at the inaugural USATF LA Grand Prix.

== Career ==
Boreman started running at a young age, and had a 5:09 mile run best in the 6th grade. At Rouse High School, she won the Texas HS University Interscholastic League championships in cross country as a freshman, and also played soccer.

From 2016 to 2022, Boreman was a member of the Colorado Buffaloes track and field program. She qualified for eight NCAA Division I national championship finals, with a best finish of 2nd at the 2017 NCAA Division I Outdoor Track and Field Championships in the 3000 metres steeplechase.

At her first U.S. senior championship final in 2022, Boreman finished 9th. In 2023, Boreman improved her 3000 m steeplechase personal best from 9:33 to 9:22.99 to win the inaugural USATF LA Grand Prix. Following that win, she signed with Oiselle. In July 2023, Boreman also won the rarely-contested 2000 metres steeplechase event at the British Milers' Club Grand Prix in Birmingham, her time of 6:09.81 setting a North American record. Boreman finished 11th at the 2023 USA Championships.

== Personal life ==
Born in Fort Hood, Texas, Boreman lived in Round Rock, Texas where she attended Rouse High School. She grew up in government assisted housing with only her mother supporting her. At the University of Colorado Boulder, she studied psychology and gender studies. She considered law school, but ultimately stayed at Colorado until 2022. After college, she moved from Boulder, Colorado to Denver and was coached by Juli Benson.

After winning the 2023 LA Grand Prix, Boreman signed as a professional with Oiselle.

== Statistics ==
=== Personal best progression ===
3000m Steeplechase progression
#	Mark	Pl.	Competition	Venue	Date	Ref.
1	10:49.08A	2nd place, silver medalist(s)	Colorado Invitational, Colorado	Boulder, CO	7 Apr 2017	
2	10:12.80	2nd place, silver medalist(s)	Stanford Cardinal Classic, Cobb Track And Angell Field	Stanford, CA	21 Apr 2017	
3	10:06.83	1st place, gold medalist(s)	Pac-12 Championships, Hayward Field	Eugene, OR	12 May 2017	
4	9:51.00	(gold) (Semi-final 1)	NCAA Division I Women's Outdoor Track and Field Championships	Eugene, OR	7 Jun 2017	
5	9:46.48	2nd place, silver medalist(s)	NCAA Division I Women's Outdoor Track and Field Championships	Eugene, OR	9 Jun 2017	
6	9:42.22	1st place, gold medalist(s)	Pac-12 Track & Field Championships	Eugene, OR	13 May 2022	
7	9:41.95	(silver) (Semi-final 2)	NCAA Division I Women's Outdoor Track and Field Championships	Eugene, OR	8 Jun 2022	
8	9:33.02	4th	NCAA Division I Women's Outdoor Track and Field Championships	Eugene, OR	10 Jun 2022	
9	9:22.99	1st place, gold medalist(s)	USATF LA Grand Prix	Westwood, CA	25 May 2023	
