= Dylan Jacobs =

American distance runner

Personal information
- Nationality: American
- Born: June 15, 2000 (age 26)
- Employer: On

Sport
- Country: United States
- Sport: Track and Field
- Event: 5,000 meters
- University team: Notre Dame Fighting Irish; Tennessee Volunteers
- Turned pro: July 2023

Achievements and titles
- Personal bests: Outdoor; 1500 m: 3:46.54 (Azusa, CA 2019); One mile: 3:57.67 (South Bend, IN 2022); 5000 m: 13:10.6 (Los Angeles, CA 2024); 10,000 m: 28:01.53 (Azusa, CA 2023); Indoor; 1000 m: 2:24.22 (South Bend, IN 2019); One mile: 4:17.29 (Blacksburg, VA 2019); 3000 m: 7:30.45 (New York City, NY 2025); 5000 m: 13:07.89 (Boston, MA 2025)
Medal record
Men's athletics
Representing Notre Dame Fighting Irish
NCAA Indoor Track and Field Championships
Gold medal – first place	2019 Birmingham	1st place
NCAA Outdoor Track and Field Championships
Gold medal – first place	2022 Eugene	1st place
Representing Tennessee Volunteers
NCAA Indoor Track and Field Championships
Gold medal – first place	2023 Albuquerque	1st place

Dylan Jacobs (born June 15, 2000) is an American distance runner who competed for Notre Dame and the Tennessee Volunteers in college before turning pro and signing with On. He is a three-time NCAA Champion.

== High school career ==
Jacobs attended Carl Sandburg High School in Orland Park, Illinois. His sophomore year, Jacobs, was part of the team that won the state cross country meet and helped the team to a fourth-place finish at Nike Cross Nationals. His junior year, he finished 13th at the Nike Cross Nationals Championship. After which, he finished 11th at the Footlocker Nationals and followed it up with a second place finish in the 4×800 relay and was all state in the 1600m at the Illinois state meet. As a Senior he was the 2017 Footlocker Nationals individual champion, and won the 1600m and 4×800 relay at the Illinois state meet.

== Collegiate career ==
Notre Dame

In Jacobs freshman year at Notre Dame he ran the 1200m leg of their NCAA Championship winning DMR team alongside Edward Cheatham, Samuel Voelz and Yared Nuguse. The following indoor season that same team ran the NCAA's second fastest DMR ever at the Alex Wilson Invitational.

Jacobs finished his junior year of cross country by placing 20th at the NCAA Championships helping the Irish run to a second place finish behind Northern Arizona. That spring in track he finished 11th at the NCAA Championships running a 13:25.65 5,000m to break the school record.

In his final year at Notre Dame Dylan finished 10th at the NCAA Cross Country Championships. He finished his time at Notre Dame by winning the 10,000m at the NCAA Championships. During the race Jacobs fell down but got back up and passed Abdihamid Nur during a 55.45 second last lap finishing in a time of 28:12.32.

Transfer to Tennessee

In June 2022 Jacobs's coach at Notre Dame, Sean Carlson, announced he was leaving Notre Dame to coach at the University of Tennessee. In July, Jacobs announced via his Instagram that he was transferring to the Tennessee. That fall, he finished 4th place at the NCAA Cross Country Championships.

Tennessee

Jacobs started his 2023 Indoor season by running 13:11.01 at the Terrier Classic on January 27, which at the time was the third fastest collegiate mark ever. Two weeks later he ran the second fastest collegiate 3000m by finishing in 7:36.89 at the Millrose Games. His time was less than half a second off the record which was set two weeks earlier by Northern Arizona runner Drew Bosley.

Jacobs won the SEC championship in the DMR and 3000m.

At the NCAA Indoor Championships Jacobs took the lead in the 5000m with 450 meters to go and ultimately won the race in 13:37.59, a facility and NCAA altitude record. Later in the meet he finished 6th in the 3000m by running 7:52.25. Following the meet, the USTFCCA named him the South Region Men's Track Athlete of the Year for the 2022-23 indoor season.

== Professional career ==
On July 5, 2023 Jacobs announced that he had signed a professional contract with On but was going to stay in Knoxville to continue being coached by Sean Carlson. On November 4, 2024 Jacobs announced that he was joining the On Athletics Club in Boulder, Colorado and will be coached by Dathan Ritzenhein.

== Results and personal records ==
Results taken from IAAF Profile.

=== Circuit performances ===
Grand Slam Track results
Slam	Race group	Event	Pl.	Time	Prize money
2025 Kingston Slam	Long distance	5000 m	3rd	14:39.56	US$20,000
2025 Kingston Slam	Long distance	3000 m	6th	8:04.86	US$20,000

=== Notable results ===
Year	Meet	Venue	Event	Place	Time	Notes
2019	NCAA Indoor Championships	Birmingham CrossPlex	DMR	1st	9:31.55	
2021	NCCA Cross Country Championships	Stillwater, Oklahoma	10,000m	20th	30:25.6	
2021	NCAA Outdoor Championships	Hayward Field	5000m	11th	13:25.65	
2021	NCCA Cross Country Championships	Tallahassee, Florida	10,000m	10th	28:47.5	
2022	NCAA Indoor Championships	Birmingham CrossPlex	5000m	9th	13:31.43	
2022	NCAA Outdoor Championships	Hayward Field	5000m	17th	13:39.21	
2022	NCAA Outdoor Championships	Hayward Field	10,000m	1st	28:12.32	
2022	NCCA Cross Country Championships	Stillwater, Oklahoma	10,000m	4th	28:58.0	
2023	Boston University John Thomas Terrier Classic	Boston University	5000m	4th	13:11.01	NCAA #6 at the time
2023	Millrose Games	Washington Avenue Armory	3000m	7th	7:36.89	2nd fastest in collegiate history
2023	NCAA Indoor Championships	Albuquerque Convention Center	5000m	1st	13:37.59	Facility Record and NCAA Altitude Record.
2023	NCAA Indoor Championships	Albuquerque Convention Center	3000m	6th	7:52.25	

=== Personal records ===
Surface	Event	Time	Date	Venue
Indoor track	3000m	7:30.45	February 8, 2025	The Armory
Indoor track	5000m	13:07.89	March 2, 2025	Boston University
Outdoor track	1500m	3:46.54	April 19, 2019	Azusa, California
Outdoor track	One mile	3:57.67	January 22, 2022	South Bend, Indiana
Outdoor track	5000m	13:10.66	May 17, 2024	Los Angeles, California
Outdoor track	10,000m	28:01.94	April 14, 2022	Hilmer Lodge Stadium

== See also ==
- Profile at World Athletics
- List of United States collegiate records in track and field
