= 2022 NCAA Division I Outdoor Track and Field Championships =

College track and field competition

- Edition: 100th (Men); 40th (Women)
- Dates: June 8–11, 2022
- Host city: Eugene, Oregon; University of Oregon
- Venue: Hayward Field
- Events: 42 (21 men's and 21 women's)

The 2022 NCAA Division I Outdoor Track and Field Championships was the 100th NCAA Division I Men's Outdoor Track and Field Championships and the 40th NCAA Division I Women's Outdoor Track and Field Championships held at Hayward Field in Eugene, Oregon on the campus of the University of Oregon. 42 events (21 men's and 21 women's) were contested from Wednesday, June 8 until Saturday, June 11, starting with the men's decathlon and ending with the women's 4 × 400-meter relay. Men's events were held on Wednesday and Friday, and women's events were held on Thursday and Saturday, with the exception of the men's decathlon which extended from Wednesday into Thursday and the women's heptathlon which began on Friday and ended on Saturday.

== Streaming and television coverage ==
In the US, the event was broadcast on ESPN2, ESPN3, and ESPNU.

== Results ==
=== Men ===
==== 100 meters ====
Wind: +0.6 m/s

Rank	Athlete	Team	Time	Notes
1st place, gold medalist(s)	(Liberia) Joseph Fahnbulleh	Florida Gators	10.00	NR
2nd place, silver medalist(s)	(Nigeria) Favour Ashe	Tennessee Volunteers	10.08	
3rd place, bronze medalist(s)	(United States) Javonte Harding	North Carolina A&T Aggies	10.08	
4	(United States) JoVaughn Martin	Florida State Seminoles	10.09	
5	(United States) Dedrick Vanover	Florida Gators	10.16	
6	(United States) Matthew Boling	Georgia Bulldogs	10.18	
7	(United States) Micah Williams	Oregon Ducks	10.19	
8	(United States) Da'Marcus Fleming	LSU Tigers	10.20	
9	(South Africa) Shaun Maswanganyi	Houston Cougars	10.26	

- Results from Flash Results.

==== 200 meters ====
Wind: +0.6 m/s

Rank	Athlete	Team	Time	Notes
1st place, gold medalist(s)	(Liberia) Joseph Fahnbulleh	Florida Gators	19.83	NR
2nd place, silver medalist(s)	(United States) Matthew Boling	Georgia Bulldogs	20.13	
3rd place, bronze medalist(s)	(Nigeria) Udodi Onwuzurike	Stanford Cardinal	20.15	
4	(United States) Micaiah Harris	Texas Longhorns	20.45	
5	(Uganda) Tarsis Orogot	Alabama Crimson Tide	20.48	
6	(South Africa) Shaun Maswanganyi	Houston Cougars	20.51	
7	(United States) Robert Gregory	TCU Horned Frogs	20.54	
8	(United States) Courtney Lindsey	Texas Tech Red Raiders	20.67	
9	(Trinidad and Tobago) Eric Harrison	Ohio State Buckeyes	20.71	

- Results from Flash Results.

==== 400 meters ====
Rank	Athlete	Team	Time	Notes
1st place, gold medalist(s)	(United States) Randolph Ross	North Carolina A&T Aggies	44.13	
2nd place, silver medalist(s)	(United States) Champion Allison	Florida Gators	44.41	
3rd place, bronze medalist(s)	(United States) Elija Godwin	Georgia Bulldogs	44.50	
4	(Barbados) Jonathan Jones	Texas Longhorns	44.93	
5	(United States) Ryan Willie	Florida Gators	45.00	
6	(United States) Richard Kuykendoll	Oklahoma Sooners	45.73	
7	(Jamaica) Jevaughn Powell	UTEP Miners	45.81	
8	(United States) Tyler Johnson	Ohio State Buckeyes	45.83	

- Results from Flash Results.

==== 800 meters ====
Rank	Athlete	Team	Time	Notes
1st place, gold medalist(s)	(Morocco) Moad Zahafi	Texas Tech Red Raiders	1:44.49	
2nd place, silver medalist(s)	(Jamaica) Navasky Anderson	Mississippi State Bulldogs	1:45.02	
3rd place, bronze medalist(s)	(United States) Brandon Miller	Texas A&M Aggies	1:45.09	
4	(United States) Jason Gomez	Iowa State Cyclones	1:46.34	
5	(United States) Sean Dolan	Villanova Wildcats	1:46.38	
6	(United States) Dayton Carlson	Arizona State Sun Devils	1:46.72	
7	(United States) Samuel Rodman	Princeton Tigers	1:46.96	
8	(United States) Jonathan Schwind	Lipscomb Bisons	1:47.12	
9	(United Kingdom) Yusuf Bizimana	Texas Longhorns	1:47.17	

- Results from Flash Results.

==== 1500 meters ====
Rank	Athlete	Team	Time	Notes
1st place, gold medalist(s)	(United States) Joe Waskom	Washington Huskies	3:45.58	
2nd place, silver medalist(s)	(Spain) Mario Garcia Romo	Ole Miss Rebels	3:45.69	
3rd place, bronze medalist(s)	(United States) Sam Ellis	Princeton Tigers	3:45.82	
4	(Belgium) Thomas Vanoppen	Wake Forrest Demon Deacons	3:46.03	
5	(United States) Luke Houser	Washington Huskies	3:46.13	
6	(United States) Jonathan Davis	Illinois Fighting Illini	3:46.15	
7	(United States) Nathan Green	Washington Huskies	3:46.26	
8	(Australia) Adam Spencer	Wisconsin Badgers	3:46.28	
9	(United States) John Petruno	Michigan State Spartans	3:46.56	
10	(United States) Isaac Basten	Drake Bulldogs	3:46.67	
11	(South Africa) George Kusche	Northern Arizona Lumberjacks	3:47.20	
12	(United States) Ryan Schoppe	Oklahoma State Cowboys	3:47.68	

- Results from Flash Results.

==== 5000 meters ====
Rank	Athlete	Team	Time	Notes
1st place, gold medalist(s)	(United States) Olin Hacker	Wisconsin Badgers	13:27.73	
2nd place, silver medalist(s)	(United States) Morgan Beadlescomb	Michigan State Spartans	13:28.38	
3rd place, bronze medalist(s)	(United States) Nico Young	Northern Arizona Lumberjacks	13:28.62	
4	(Australia) Ky Robinson	Stanford Cardinals	13:30.23	
5	(United States) Sam Gilman	Air Force Falcons	13:30.82	
6	(Republic of Ireland) Michael Power	Tulsa Golden Hurricanes	13:31.23	
7	(Republic of Ireland) Brian Fay	Washington Huskies	13:31.39	
8	(United States) Alex Ostberg	North Carolina Tar Heels	13:31.60	
9	(United States) Cole Sprout	Stanford Cardinals	13:32.53	
10	(United States) Casey Clinger	BYU Cougars	13:33.20	
11	(Australia) Zach Facioni	Wake Forest Demon Deacons	13:33.46	
12	(United States) Acer Iverson	Harvard Crimsons	13:34.01	
13	(Germany) Aaron Bienenfeld	Oregon Ducks	13:34.36	
14	(Ethiopia) Ahmed Muhumed	Florida State Seminoles	13:36.40	
15	(Kenya) Amon Kemboi	Arkansas Razorbacks	13:37.13	
16	(South Africa) Adriaan Wildschutt	Florida State Seminoles	13:37.60	
17	(United States) Dylan Jacobs	Notre Dame Fighting Irish	13:39.21	
18	(United States) Vincent Mauri	Arizona State Sun Devils	13:45.54	
19	(Kenya) Athanas Kioko	Campbell Fighting Camels	13:47.61	
20	(United States) Eric Van der Els	Connecticut Huskies	13:48.37	
21	(United States) Ryan Ford	Iowa State Cyclones	13:50.03	
22	(United States) Matthew Pereira	Harvard Crimsons	13:53.09	
23	(United States) Cole Bullock	Ole Miss Rebels	13:55.07	
24	(United States) Dan Schaffer	Binghamton Bearcats	14:00.95	

- Results from Flash Results.

==== 10000 meters ====
Rank	Athlete	Team	Time	Notes
1st place, gold medalist(s)	(United States) Dylan Jacobs	Notre Dame Fighting Irish	28:12.31	
2nd place, silver medalist(s)	(United States) Alex Maier	Oklahoma State Cowboys	28:12.68	
3rd place, bronze medalist(s)	(United States) Abdihamid Nur	Northern Arizona Lumberjacks	28:14.51	
4	(United States) Cole Sprout	Stanford Cardinal	28:14.89	
5	(Kenya) Athanas Kioko	Campbell Fighting Camels	28:17.17	
6	(United Kingdom) Charles Hicks	Stanford Cardinal	28:17.88	
7	(South Africa) Adriaan Wildschutt	Florida State Seminoles	28:18.28	
8	(Germany) Aaron Bienenfeld	Oregon Ducks	28:19.05	
9	(Republic of Ireland) Barry Keane	Butler Bulldogs	28:19.94	
10	(Kenya) Amon Kemboi	Arkansas Razorbacks	28:21.64	
11	(United States) Brandon Garnica	BYU Cougars	28:21.81	
12	(United States) Casey Clinger	BYU Cougars	28:22.99	
13	(United States) Acer Iverson	Harvard Crimson	28:23.29	
14	(Kenya) Patrick Kiprop	Arkansas Razorbacks	28:26.25	
15	(United States) James Mwaura	Gonzaga Bulldogs	28:29.58	
16	(United States) Matthew Carmody	Notre Dame Fighting Irish	28:34.28	
17	(Canada) Kieran Lumb	Washington Huskies	28:36.31	
18	(United States) Matthew Pereira	Harvard Crimson	28:43.95	
19	(Australia) Haftu Strintzos	Villanova Wildcats	28:47.35	
20	(Republic of Ireland) Fearghal Curtin	Charleston Southern Buccaneers	28:52.40	
21	(United States) Josh Methner	Notre Dame Fighting Irish	28:57.31	
22	(United States) Bob Liking	Wisconsin Badgers	29:02.46	
23	(Kenya) Victor Kiprop	Alabama Crimson Tide	29:05.83	
24	(Canada) Andrew Alexander	Notre Dame Fighting Irish	29:09.02	

- Results from Flash Results.

==== 110-meter hurdles ====
Wind: -0.0 m/s

Rank	Athlete	Team	Time	Notes
1st place, gold medalist(s)	(United States) Trey Cunningham	Florida State Seminoles	13.00	
2nd place, silver medalist(s)	(United States) Eric Edwards Jr.	LSU Tigers	13.15	
3rd place, bronze medalist(s)	(United Kingdom) Joshua Zeller	Michigan Wolverines	13.26	
4	(Jamaica) Giano Roberts	Clemson Tigers	13.442	
5	(Jamaica) Lafranz Campell	Clemson Tigers	13.444	
6	(United States) Kentre Patterson	Ohio State Buckeyes	13.46	
7	(United States) Justin Leaston	Charlotte 49ers	13.50	
8	(United Kingdom) Tade Ojora	USC Trojans	13.58	
9	(Jamaica) Jaheem Hayles	Syracuse Orange	13.73	

- Results from Flash Results.

==== 400-meter hurdles ====
Rank	Athlete	Team	Time	Notes
1st place, gold medalist(s)	(United States) Sean Burrell	LSU Tigers	48.70	
2nd place, silver medalist(s)	(Canada) Malik Metivier	Texas Tech Red Raiders	49.13	
3rd place, bronze medalist(s)	(United States) Isaiah Levingston	Oklahoma Sooners	49.20	
4	(Nigeria) Nathaniel Ezekiel	Baylor Bears	49.24	
5	(United States) Quivell Jordan-Bacot	Houston Cougars	49.52	
6	(United States) Drake Schneider	Montana State Bobcats	49.75	
7	(United States) Colten Yardley	BYU Cougars	50.10	
8	(United States) James Smith II	Texas A&M Aggies	50.19	
9	(Barbados) Rivaldo Leacock	New Mexico Lobos	50.84	

- Results from Flash Results.

==== 3000-meter steeplechase ====
Rank	Athlete	Team	Time	Notes
1st place, gold medalist(s)	(Tunisia) Ahmed Jaziri	Eastern Kentucky Colonels	8:18.70	
2nd place, silver medalist(s)	(United States) Duncan Hamilton	Montana State Bobcats	8:18.88	
3rd place, bronze medalist(s)	(United States) Parker Stokes	Georgetown Hoyas	8:18.88	
4	(Canada) Ryan Smeeton	Oklahoma State Cowboys	8:20.06	
5	(Australia) Ed Trippas	Princeton Tigers	8:20.29	
6	(United States) Kenneth Rooks	BYU Cougars	8:22.56	
7	(United States) Alec Basten	Minnesota Golden Gophers	8:23.86	
8	(United States) Matthew Wilkinson	Minnesota Golden Gophers	8:25.03	
9	(United States) Levi Taylor	Montana State Bobcats	8:33.37	
10	(Spain) Estanis Ruiz	Loyola Marymount Lions	8:36.02	
11	(United States) Colton Johnsen	Washington State Cougars	8:37.38	
12	(United States) Bennett Pascoe	Arkansas State Red Wolves	9:02.51	

- Results from Flash Results.

==== 4 × 100-meter relay ====
Rank	Team	Time	Notes
1st place, gold medalist(s)	USC	38.49	SB
2nd place, silver medalist(s)	Florida	38.52	
3rd place, bronze medalist(s)	Houston	38.64	SB
4	Tennessee	38.83	
5	Baylor	38.99	
6	Texas	39.06	
7	TCU	39.08	
8	North Carolina A&T	39.35	
9	Clemson	39.44	

- Results from Flash Results.

==== 4 × 400-meter relay ====
Rank	Team	Time	Notes
1st place, gold medalist(s)	Florida	2:58.88	FR MR
2nd place, silver medalist(s)	USC	2:59.98	PB
3rd place, bronze medalist(s)	Alabama	3:00.17	PB
4	Texas	3:01.69	
5	Texas A&M	3:01.72	
6	Kentucky	3:02.98	
7	Iowa	3:03.04	
8	North Carolina A&T	3:03.15	
9	LSU	3:03.40	

- Results from Flash Results.

==== Long jump ====
Rank	Athlete	Team	Mark	Wind (m/s)	Notes
1st place, gold medalist(s)	(Jamaica) Wayne Pinnock	Arkansas Razorbacks	8.00 m (26 ft 2 3/4 in)	+0.0	
2nd place, silver medalist(s)			0.00 m (0 in)	+0.0	
3rd place, bronze medalist(s)			0.00 m (0 in)	+0.0	
4			0.00 m (0 in)	+0.0	
5			0.00 m (0 in)	+0.0	
6			0.00 m (0 in)	+0.0	
7			0.00 m (0 in)	+0.0	
8			0.00 m (0 in)	+0.0	
9			0.00 m (0 in)	+0.0	
10			0.00 m (0 in)	+0.0	
11			0.00 m (0 in)	+0.0	
12			0.00 m (0 in)	+0.0	
13			0.00 m (0 in)	+0.0	
14			0.00 m (0 in)	+0.0	
15			0.00 m (0 in)	+0.0	
16			0.00 m (0 in)	+0.0	
17			0.00 m (0 in)	+0.0	
18			0.00 m (0 in)	+0.0	
19			0.00 m (0 in)	+0.0	
20			0.00 m (0 in)	+0.0	
21			0.00 m (0 in)	+0.0	
22			0.00 m (0 in)	+0.0	
23			0.00 m (0 in)	+0.0	
24			0.00 m (0 in)	+0.0	

- Results from Flash Results.

==== Triple jump ====
Rank	Athlete	Team	Mark	Wind (m/s)	Notes
1st place, gold medalist(s)			0.00 m (0 in)	+0.0	
2nd place, silver medalist(s)			0.00 m (0 in)	+0.0	
3rd place, bronze medalist(s)			0.00 m (0 in)	+0.0	
4			0.00 m (0 in)	+0.0	
5			0.00 m (0 in)	+0.0	
6			0.00 m (0 in)	+0.0	
7			0.00 m (0 in)	+0.0	
8			0.00 m (0 in)	+0.0	
9			0.00 m (0 in)	+0.0	
10			0.00 m (0 in)	+0.0	
11			0.00 m (0 in)	+0.0	
12			0.00 m (0 in)	+0.0	
13			0.00 m (0 in)	+0.0	
14			0.00 m (0 in)	+0.0	
15			0.00 m (0 in)	+0.0	
16			0.00 m (0 in)	+0.0	
17			0.00 m (0 in)	+0.0	
18			0.00 m (0 in)	+0.0	
19			0.00 m (0 in)	+0.0	
20			0.00 m (0 in)	+0.0	
21			0.00 m (0 in)	+0.0	
22			0.00 m (0 in)	+0.0	
23			0.00 m (0 in)	+0.0	
24			0.00 m (0 in)	+0.0	

- Results from Flash Results.

==== High jump ====
Rank	Athlete	Team	Mark	Notes
1st place, gold medalist(s)			0.00 m (0 in)	
2nd place, silver medalist(s)			0.00 m (0 in)	
3rd place, bronze medalist(s)			0.00 m (0 in)	
4			0.00 m (0 in)	
5			0.00 m (0 in)	
6			0.00 m (0 in)	
7			0.00 m (0 in)	
8			0.00 m (0 in)	
9			0.00 m (0 in)	
10			0.00 m (0 in)	
11			0.00 m (0 in)	
12			0.00 m (0 in)	
13			0.00 m (0 in)	
14			0.00 m (0 in)	
15			0.00 m (0 in)	
16			0.00 m (0 in)	
17			0.00 m (0 in)	
18			0.00 m (0 in)	
19			0.00 m (0 in)	
20			0.00 m (0 in)	
21			0.00 m (0 in)	
22			0.00 m (0 in)	
23			0.00 m (0 in)	
24			0.00 m (0 in)	

- Results from Flash Results.

==== Pole vault ====
Rank	Athlete	Team	Mark	Notes
1st place, gold medalist(s)			0.00 m (0 in)	
2nd place, silver medalist(s)			0.00 m (0 in)	
3rd place, bronze medalist(s)			0.00 m (0 in)	
4			0.00 m (0 in)	
5			0.00 m (0 in)	
6			0.00 m (0 in)	
7			0.00 m (0 in)	
8			0.00 m (0 in)	
9			0.00 m (0 in)	
10			0.00 m (0 in)	
11			0.00 m (0 in)	
12			0.00 m (0 in)	
13			0.00 m (0 in)	
14			0.00 m (0 in)	
15			0.00 m (0 in)	
16			0.00 m (0 in)	
17			0.00 m (0 in)	
18			0.00 m (0 in)	
19			0.00 m (0 in)	
20			0.00 m (0 in)	
21			0.00 m (0 in)	
22			0.00 m (0 in)	
23			0.00 m (0 in)	
24			0.00 m (0 in)	

- Results from Flash Results.

==== Shot put ====
Rank	Athlete	Team	Mark	Notes
1st place, gold medalist(s)			0.00 m (0 in)	
2nd place, silver medalist(s)			0.00 m (0 in)	
3rd place, bronze medalist(s)			0.00 m (0 in)	
4			0.00 m (0 in)	
5			0.00 m (0 in)	
6			0.00 m (0 in)	
7			0.00 m (0 in)	
8			0.00 m (0 in)	
9			0.00 m (0 in)	
10			0.00 m (0 in)	
11			0.00 m (0 in)	
12			0.00 m (0 in)	
13			0.00 m (0 in)	
14			0.00 m (0 in)	
15			0.00 m (0 in)	
16			0.00 m (0 in)	
17			0.00 m (0 in)	
18			0.00 m (0 in)	
19			0.00 m (0 in)	
20			0.00 m (0 in)	
21			0.00 m (0 in)	
22			0.00 m (0 in)	
23			0.00 m (0 in)	
24			0.00 m (0 in)	

- Results from Flash Results.

==== Discus throw ====
Rank	Athlete	Team	Mark	Notes
1st place, gold medalist(s)			0.00 m (0 in)	
2nd place, silver medalist(s)			0.00 m (0 in)	
3rd place, bronze medalist(s)			0.00 m (0 in)	
4			0.00 m (0 in)	
5			0.00 m (0 in)	
6			0.00 m (0 in)	
7			0.00 m (0 in)	
8			0.00 m (0 in)	
9			0.00 m (0 in)	
10			0.00 m (0 in)	
11			0.00 m (0 in)	
12			0.00 m (0 in)	
13			0.00 m (0 in)	
14			0.00 m (0 in)	
15			0.00 m (0 in)	
16			0.00 m (0 in)	
17			0.00 m (0 in)	
18			0.00 m (0 in)	
19			0.00 m (0 in)	
20			0.00 m (0 in)	
21			0.00 m (0 in)	
22			0.00 m (0 in)	
23			0.00 m (0 in)	
24			0.00 m (0 in)	

- Results from Flash Results.

==== Javelin throw ====
Rank	Athlete	Team	Mark	Notes
1st place, gold medalist(s)			0.00 m (0 in)	
2nd place, silver medalist(s)			0.00 m (0 in)	
3rd place, bronze medalist(s)			0.00 m (0 in)	
4			0.00 m (0 in)	
5			0.00 m (0 in)	
6			0.00 m (0 in)	
7			0.00 m (0 in)	
8			0.00 m (0 in)	
9			0.00 m (0 in)	
10			0.00 m (0 in)	
11			0.00 m (0 in)	
12			0.00 m (0 in)	
13			0.00 m (0 in)	
14			0.00 m (0 in)	
15			0.00 m (0 in)	
16			0.00 m (0 in)	
17			0.00 m (0 in)	
18			0.00 m (0 in)	
19			0.00 m (0 in)	
20			0.00 m (0 in)	
21			0.00 m (0 in)	
22			0.00 m (0 in)	
23			0.00 m (0 in)	
24			0.00 m (0 in)	

- Results from Flash Results.

==== Hammer throw ====
Rank	Athlete	Team	Mark	Notes
1st place, gold medalist(s)	Logan Blomquist	SE Missouri	73.37 m (240 ft 8 1/2 in)	
2nd place, silver medalist(s)	Tyler Merkley	Penn State	72.70 m (238 ft 6 in)	
3rd place, bronze medalist(s)	Kostas Zaltos	Minnesota	72.51 m (237 ft 10 1/2 in)	
4	Bobby Colantonio	Alabama	71.97 m (236 ft 1 1/4 in)	
5	Michael Bryan	Wichita State	71.56 m (234 ft 9 1/4 in)	
6	Alexander Talley	Nebraska	71.52 m (234 ft 7 1/2 in)	
7	Decio Andrade	Miami (Fla.)	70.86 m (232 ft 5 3/4 in)	
8	Trey Knight	USC	0.00 m (0 in)	
9	Jayden White	Washington	0.00 m (0 in)	
10	Jake Norris	LSU	0.00 m (0 in)	
11	Bayley Campbell	Oklahoma	0.00 m (0 in)	
12	Edward Jeans	Oklahoma	0.00 m (0 in)	
13	Kade McCall	Kansas State	0.00 m (0 in)	
14	Alencar Pereira	Georgia	0.00 m (0 in)	
15	James Joycey	North Carolina	0.00 m (0 in)	
16	Sean Mockler	Indiana	0.00 m (0 in)	
17	Khalil Bedoui	Virginia Tech	0.00 m (0 in)	
18	Kelly Cook Jr.	Purdue	0.00 m (0 in)	
19	Kyle Brown	Auburn	0.00 m (0 in)	
20	Ivar Moisander	California	0.00 m (0 in)	
21	Anthony Barmes	Drake	0.00 m (0 in)	
22	Evan Stork	Sacramento St.	0.00 m (0 in)	
23	Robert Watson	Memphis	0.00 m (0 in)	
24	Noah Walker	Pittsburgh	0.00 m (0 in)	

- Results from Flash Results.

==== Decathlon ====
Rank	Athlete	Team	Overall points	100 m	LJ	SP	HJ	400 m	110 m H	DT	PV	JT	1500 m
1st place, gold medalist(s)	Ayden Owens-Delerme (PUR)	Arkansas	8457 =MR	000; 00.00	000; 0.00 m (0 in)	000; 00.00 m (0 in)	000; 0.00 m (0 in)	000; 00.00	000; 00.00	000; 00.00 m (0 in)	000; 0.00 m (0 in)	000; 00.00 m (0 in)	000; 0:00.00
2nd place, silver medalist(s)	Leo Neugebauer (GER)	Texas	8362 PB	000; 00.00	000; 0.00 m (0 in)	000; 00.00 m (0 in)	000; 0.00 m (0 in)	000; 00.00	000; 00.00	000; 00.00 m (0 in)	000; 0.00 m (0 in)	000; 00.00 m (0 in)	000; 0:00.00
3rd place, bronze medalist(s)	Kyle Garland (USA)	Georgia	8333	000; 00.00	000; 0.00 m (0 in)	000; 00.00 m (0 in)	000; 0.00 m (0 in)	000; 00.00	000; 00.00	000; 00.00 m (0 in)	000; 0.00 m (0 in)	000; 00.00 m (0 in)	000; 0:00.00
4			0000	000; 00.00	000; 0.00 m (0 in)	000; 00.00 m (0 in)	000; 0.00 m (0 in)	000; 00.00	000; 00.00	000; 00.00 m (0 in)	000; 0.00 m (0 in)	000; 00.00 m (0 in)	000; 0:00.00
5			0000	000; 00.00	000; 0.00 m (0 in)	000; 00.00 m (0 in)	000; 0.00 m (0 in)	000; 00.00	000; 00.00	000; 00.00 m (0 in)	000; 0.00 m (0 in)	000; 00.00 m (0 in)	000; 0:00.00
6			0000	000; 00.00	000; 0.00 m (0 in)	000; 00.00 m (0 in)	000; 0.00 m (0 in)	000; 00.00	000; 00.00	000; 00.00 m (0 in)	000; 0.00 m (0 in)	000; 00.00 m (0 in)	000; 0:00.00
7			0000	000; 00.00	000; 0.00 m (0 in)	000; 00.00 m (0 in)	000; 0.00 m (0 in)	000; 00.00	000; 00.00	000; 00.00 m (0 in)	000; 0.00 m (0 in)	000; 00.00 m (0 in)	000; 0:00.00
8			0000	000; 00.00	000; 0.00 m (0 in)	000; 00.00 m (0 in)	000; 0.00 m (0 in)	000; 00.00	000; 00.00	000; 00.00 m (0 in)	000; 0.00 m (0 in)	000; 00.00 m (0 in)	000; 0:00.00
9			0000	000; 00.00	000; 0.00 m (0 in)	000; 00.00 m (0 in)	000; 0.00 m (0 in)	000; 00.00	000; 00.00	000; 00.00 m (0 in)	000; 0.00 m (0 in)	000; 00.00 m (0 in)	000; 0:00.00
10			0000	000; 00.00	000; 0.00 m (0 in)	000; 00.00 m (0 in)	000; 0.00 m (0 in)	000; 00.00	000; 00.00	000; 00.00 m (0 in)	000; 0.00 m (0 in)	000; 00.00 m (0 in)	000; 0:00.00
11			0000	000; 00.00	000; 0.00 m (0 in)	000; 00.00 m (0 in)	000; 0.00 m (0 in)	000; 00.00	000; 00.00	000; 00.00 m (0 in)	000; 0.00 m (0 in)	000; 00.00 m (0 in)	000; 0:00.00
12			0000	000; 00.00	000; 0.00 m (0 in)	000; 00.00 m (0 in)	000; 0.00 m (0 in)	000; 00.00	000; 00.00	000; 00.00 m (0 in)	000; 0.00 m (0 in)	000; 00.00 m (0 in)	000; 0:00.00
13			0000	000; 00.00	000; 0.00 m (0 in)	000; 00.00 m (0 in)	000; 0.00 m (0 in)	000; 00.00	000; 00.00	000; 00.00 m (0 in)	000; 0.00 m (0 in)	000; 00.00 m (0 in)	000; 0:00.00
14			0000	000; 00.00	000; 0.00 m (0 in)	000; 00.00 m (0 in)	000; 0.00 m (0 in)	000; 00.00	000; 00.00	000; 00.00 m (0 in)	000; 0.00 m (0 in)	000; 00.00 m (0 in)	000; 0:00.00
15			0000	000; 00.00	000; 0.00 m (0 in)	000; 00.00 m (0 in)	000; 0.00 m (0 in)	000; 00.00	000; 00.00	000; 00.00 m (0 in)	000; 0.00 m (0 in)	000; 00.00 m (0 in)	000; 0:00.00
16			0000	000; 00.00	000; 0.00 m (0 in)	000; 00.00 m (0 in)	000; 0.00 m (0 in)	000; 00.00	000; 00.00	000; 00.00 m (0 in)	000; 0.00 m (0 in)	000; 00.00 m (0 in)	000; 0:00.00
17			0000	000; 00.00	000; 0.00 m (0 in)	000; 00.00 m (0 in)	000; 0.00 m (0 in)	000; 00.00	000; 00.00	000; 00.00 m (0 in)	000; 0.00 m (0 in)	000; 00.00 m (0 in)	000; 0:00.00
18			0000	000; 00.00	000; 0.00 m (0 in)	000; 00.00 m (0 in)	000; 0.00 m (0 in)	000; 00.00	000; 00.00	000; 00.00 m (0 in)	000; 0.00 m (0 in)	000; 00.00 m (0 in)	000; 0:00.00
19			0000	000; 00.00	000; 0.00 m (0 in)	000; 00.00 m (0 in)	000; 0.00 m (0 in)	000; 00.00	000; 00.00	000; 00.00 m (0 in)	000; 0.00 m (0 in)	000; 00.00 m (0 in)	000; 0:00.00
20			0000	000; 00.00	000; 0.00 m (0 in)	000; 00.00 m (0 in)	000; 0.00 m (0 in)	000; 00.00	000; 00.00	000; 00.00 m (0 in)	000; 0.00 m (0 in)	000; 00.00 m (0 in)	000; 0:00.00
21			0000	000; 00.00	000; 0.00 m (0 in)	000; 00.00 m (0 in)	000; 0.00 m (0 in)	000; 00.00	000; 00.00	000; 00.00 m (0 in)	000; 0.00 m (0 in)	000; 00.00 m (0 in)	000; 0:00.00
22			0000	000; 00.00	000; 0.00 m (0 in)	000; 00.00 m (0 in)	000; 0.00 m (0 in)	000; 00.00	000; 00.00	000; 00.00 m (0 in)	000; 0.00 m (0 in)	000; 00.00 m (0 in)	000; 0:00.00
23			0000	000; 00.00	000; 0.00 m (0 in)	000; 00.00 m (0 in)	000; 0.00 m (0 in)	000; 00.00	000; 00.00	000; 00.00 m (0 in)	000; 0.00 m (0 in)	000; 00.00 m (0 in)	000; 0:00.00
24			0000	000; 00.00	000; 0.00 m (0 in)	000; 00.00 m (0 in)	000; 0.00 m (0 in)	000; 00.00	000; 00.00	000; 00.00 m (0 in)	000; 0.00 m (0 in)	000; 00.00 m (0 in)	000; 0:00.00

- Results from Flash Results.

=== Women ===
==== 100 meters ====
Wind: +0.0 m/s

Rank	Athlete	Team	Time	Notes
1st place, gold medalist(s)	(Saint Lucia) Julien Alfred	Texas Longhorns	11.015	
2nd place, silver medalist(s)	(Jamaica) Kemba Nelson	Oregon Ducks	11.020	
3rd place, bronze medalist(s)	(United States) Abbey Steiner	Kentucky Wildcats	11.08	
4	(Nigeria) Rosemary Chukwuma	Texas Tech Red Raiders	11.14	
5	(Nigeria) Favour Ofili	LSU Tigers	11.17	
6	(Nigeria) Grace Nwokocha	North Carolina A&T Aggies	11.21	
7	(Jamaica) Kevona Davis	Texas Longhorns	11.22	
8	(United States) Melissa Jefferson	Coastal Carolina Chanticleers	11.24	
9	(Antigua and Barbuda) Joella Lloyd	Tennessee Volunteers	11.29	

- Results from Flash Results.

==== 200 meters ====
Wind: -0.0 m/s

Rank	Athlete	Team	Time	Notes
1st place, gold medalist(s)	(United States) Abby Steiner	Kentucky Wildcats	21.80	
2nd place, silver medalist(s)	(Nigeria) Favour Ofili	LSU Tigers	22.05	
3rd place, bronze medalist(s)	(United States) Anavia Battle	Ohio State Buckeyes	22.33	
4	(United States) Kynnedy Flannel	Texas Longhorns	22.35	
5	(Jamaica) Kevona Davis	Texas Longhorns	22.50	
6	(Nigeria) Grace Nwokocha	North Carolina A&T Aggies	22.52	
7	(Bahrain) Edidiong Odiong	Florida State Seminols	22.70	
8	(Antigua and Barbuda) Joella Lloyd	Tennessee Volunteers	22.80	
9	(United States) Melissa Jefferson	Coastal Carolina Chanticleers	22.90	

- Results from Flash Results.

==== 400 meters ====
Rank	Athlete	Team	Time	Notes
1st place, gold medalist(s)	(United States) Talitha Diggs	Florida Gators	49.99	
2nd place, silver medalist(s)	(Jamaica) Charokee Young	Texas A&M Aggies	50.65	
3rd place, bronze medalist(s)	(United States) Kennedy Simon	Texas Longhorns	50.69	
4	(United States) Alexis Holmes	Kentucky Wildcats	50.71	
5	(Jamaica) Stacey Ann Williams	Texas Longhorns	51.13	
6	(United States) Shae Anderson	UCLA Bruins	51.50	
7	(United States) Rosey Effiong	Arkansas Razorbacks	51.55	
8	(Jamaica) Kavia Francis	Baylor Bears	52.16	
9	(United States) Makenzie Dunmore	South Carolina Gamecocks	54.73	

- Results from Flash Results.

==== 800 meters ====
Rank	Athlete	Team	Time	Notes
1st place, gold medalist(s)	(United States) Kristie Schoffield	Boise State Broncos	2:01.09	
2nd place, silver medalist(s)	(United States) McKenna Keegan	Villanova Wildcats	2:01.71	
3rd place, bronze medalist(s)	(Lithuania) Gabija Galvydyte	Oklahoma State Cowboys	2:01.76	
4	(Australia) Imogen Barrett	Florida Gators	2:02.05	
5	(United States) Sarah Hendrick	Kennesaw State Owls	2:02.19	
6	(United States) Valery Tobias	Texas Longhorns	2:02.74	
7	(United States) Aaliyah Miller	Baylor Bears	2:03.05	
8	(Northern Ireland) Katy-Ann McDonald	LSU Tigers	2:03.57	
9	(United States) Gabrielle Wilkinson	Florida Gators	2:06.40	

- Results from Flash Results.

==== 1500 meters ====
Rank	Athlete	Team	Time	Notes
1st place, gold medalist(s)	(Italy) Sintayehu Vissa	Ole Miss Rebels	4:09.42	
2nd place, silver medalist(s)	(United States) Micaela Degenero	Colorado Buffaloes	4:09.62	
3rd place, bronze medalist(s)	(United States) Christina Aragon	Stanford Cardinal	4:10.00	
4	(United States) Krissy Gear	Arkansas Razorbacks	4:10.06	
5	(United States) Julia Heymach	Stanford Cardinal	4:10.58	
6	(United States) Emily Mackay	Binghampton Bearcats	4:11.10	
7	(Northern Ireland) Shannon Flockhart	Providence Friars	4:11.11	
8	(Kenya) Eusila Chepkemei	Middle Tennessee State Blue Raiders	4:11.44	
9	(United States) Olivia Howell	Illinois Fighting Illini	4:12.22	
10	(New Zealand) Maia Ramsden	Harvard Crimson	4:12.46	
11	(Northern Ireland) Ellie Leather	Cincinnati Bearcats	4:13.37	
12	(United States) Melissa Tenaka	Stanford Cardinal	4:21.28	

- Results from Flash Results.

==== 5000 meters ====
Rank	Athlete	Team	Time	Notes
1st place, gold medalist(s)	(United States) Katelyn Tuohy	NC State Wolfpack	15:18.39	
2nd place, silver medalist(s)	(United States) Parker Valby	Florida Gators	15:20.10	
3rd place, bronze medalist(s)	(United States) Taylor Roe	Oklahoma State Cowboys	15:24.41	
4	(Kenya) Mercy Chelangat	Alabama Crimson Tide	15:24.54	
5	(United States) Lauren Gregory	Arkansas Razorbacks	15:28.33	
6	(United States) Abby Nichols	Colorado Buffaloes	15:33.09	
7	(Canada) Gracelyn Larkin	New Mexico Lobos	15:33.10	
8	(United States) Isabel Van Camp	Arkansas Razorbacks	15:35.64	
9	(United States) Marlee Starliper	NC State Wolfpack	15:36.51	
10	(United States) Samantha Bush	NC State Wolfpack	15:42.61	
11	(United States) Hannah Steelman	NC State Wolfpack	15:43.45	
12	(Australia) Cara Woolnough	Utah Utes	15:45.26	
13	(United States) Sydney Seymour	Tennessee Volunteers	15:51.50	
14	(United States) Emily Covert	Colorado Buffaloes	15:52.99	
15	(United States) Lucy Jenks	Stanford Cardinal	15:55.19	
16	(Australia) Amelia Mazza-Downie	New Mexico Lobos	15:58.39	
17	(United States) Amaris Tyynismaa	Alabama Crimson Tide	15:59.19	
18	(Germany) Emma Heckel	New Mexico Lobos	16:01.51	
19	(Kenya) Eusila Chepkemei	Middle Tennessee State Blue Raiders	16:01.65	
20	(United States) Savannah Shaw	NC State Wolfpack	16:02.32	
21	(United States) Nicole Fegans	Georgia Tech Yellow Jackets	16:05.64	
22	(United States) Bethany Hasz	Minnesota Golden Gophers	16:12.58	
23	(United States) India Johnson	Colorado Buffaloes	16:16.09	
	(United States) Elizabeth Mancini	La Salle Explorers	DNF	

- Results from Flash Results.

==== 10000 meters ====
Rank	Athlete	Team	Time	Notes
1st place, gold medalist(s)	(Kenya) Mercy Chelangat	Alabama Crimson Tide	32:37.08	
2nd place, silver medalist(s)			00:00.00	
3rd place, bronze medalist(s)			00:00.00	
4			00:00.00	
5			00:00.00	
6			00:00.00	
7			00:00.00	
8			00:00.00	
9			00:00.00	
10			00:00.00	
11			00:00.00	
12			00:00.00	
13			00:00.00	
14			00:00.00	
15			00:00.00	
16			00:00.00	
17			00:00.00	
18			00:00.00	
19			00:00.00	
20			00:00.00	
21			00:00.00	
22			00:00.00	
23			00:00.00	
24			00:00.00	

- Results from Flash Results.

==== 100-meter hurdles ====
Wind: -0.2 m/s

Rank	Athlete	Team	Time	Notes
1st place, gold medalist(s)	Alia Amrstrong	Louisiana State	12.57	
2nd place, silver medalist(s)	Jamine Jones	Southern California	12.66	PB
3rd place, bronze medalist(s)	Masai Russell (USA)	Kentucky	12.81	
4	Paula Salmon	North Carolina A&T	12.85	
5	Kaylah Robinson	Texas A&M	12.86	
6	Destiny Huven	Wisconsin	12.92	
7	Demisha Roswell	Texas Tech	12.94	
8	Destinee Rocker	South Carolina	13.07	

- Results from Flash Results.

==== 400-meter hurdles ====
Rank	Athlete	Team	Time	Notes
1st place, gold medalist(s)			00.00	
2nd place, silver medalist(s)			00.00	
3rd place, bronze medalist(s)			00.00	
4			00.00	
5			00.00	
6			00.00	
7			00.00	
8			00.00	

- Results from Flash Results.

==== 3000-meter steeplechase ====
Rank	Athlete	Team	Time	Notes
1st place, gold medalist(s)			00:00.00	
2nd place, silver medalist(s)			00:00.00	
3rd place, bronze medalist(s)			00:00.00	
4			00:00.00	
5			00:00.00	
6			00:00.00	
7			00:00.00	
8			00:00.00	
9			00:00.00	
10			00:00.00	
11			00:00.00	
12			00:00.00	

- Results from Flash Results.

==== 4 × 100-meter relay ====
Rank	Team	Time	Notes
1st place, gold medalist(s)	Texas	42.42	
2nd place, silver medalist(s)	Kentucky	42.55	
3rd place, bronze medalist(s)	Oregon	42.59	SB
4	LSU	42.62	
5	Florida State	43.18	
6	Ohio State	43.52	
7	UCF	43.69	
8	Coastal Carolina	43.78	

- Results from Flash Results.

==== 4 × 400-meter relay ====
Rank	Team	Time	Notes
1st place, gold medalist(s)	Kentucky	3:22.55	
2nd place, silver medalist(s)	Texas	3:23.35	
3rd place, bronze medalist(s)	Arkansas	3:23.69	
4	Texas A&M	3:24.55	
5	South Carolina	3:25.78	
6	Howard	3:28.39	
7	UCLA	3:28.71	
8	Baylor	3:28.89	
9	Florida	3:31.16	

- Results from Flash Results.

==== Long jump ====
Rank	Athlete	Team	Mark	Wind (m/s)	Notes
1st place, gold medalist(s)			0.00 m (0 in)	+0.0	
2nd place, silver medalist(s)			0.00 m (0 in)	+0.0	
3rd place, bronze medalist(s)			0.00 m (0 in)	+0.0	
4			0.00 m (0 in)	+0.0	
5			0.00 m (0 in)	+0.0	
6			0.00 m (0 in)	+0.0	
7			0.00 m (0 in)	+0.0	
8			0.00 m (0 in)	+0.0	
9			0.00 m (0 in)	+0.0	
10			0.00 m (0 in)	+0.0	
11			0.00 m (0 in)	+0.0	
12			0.00 m (0 in)	+0.0	
13			0.00 m (0 in)	+0.0	
14			0.00 m (0 in)	+0.0	
15			0.00 m (0 in)	+0.0	
16			0.00 m (0 in)	+0.0	
17			0.00 m (0 in)	+0.0	
18			0.00 m (0 in)	+0.0	
19			0.00 m (0 in)	+0.0	
20			0.00 m (0 in)	+0.0	
21			0.00 m (0 in)	+0.0	
22			0.00 m (0 in)	+0.0	
23			0.00 m (0 in)	+0.0	
24			0.00 m (0 in)	+0.0	

- Results from Flash Results.

==== Triple jump ====
Rank	Athlete	Team	Mark	Wind (m/s)	Notes
1st place, gold medalist(s)			0.00 m (0 in)	+0.0	
2nd place, silver medalist(s)			0.00 m (0 in)	+0.0	
3rd place, bronze medalist(s)			0.00 m (0 in)	+0.0	
4			0.00 m (0 in)	+0.0	
5			0.00 m (0 in)	+0.0	
6			0.00 m (0 in)	+0.0	
7			0.00 m (0 in)	+0.0	
8			0.00 m (0 in)	+0.0	
9			0.00 m (0 in)	+0.0	
10			0.00 m (0 in)	+0.0	
11			0.00 m (0 in)	+0.0	
12			0.00 m (0 in)	+0.0	
13			0.00 m (0 in)	+0.0	
14			0.00 m (0 in)	+0.0	
15			0.00 m (0 in)	+0.0	
16			0.00 m (0 in)	+0.0	
17			0.00 m (0 in)	+0.0	
18			0.00 m (0 in)	+0.0	
19			0.00 m (0 in)	+0.0	
20			0.00 m (0 in)	+0.0	
21			0.00 m (0 in)	+0.0	
22			0.00 m (0 in)	+0.0	
23			0.00 m (0 in)	+0.0	
24			0.00 m (0 in)	+0.0	

- Results from Flash Results.

==== High jump ====
Rank	Athlete	Team	Mark	Notes
1st place, gold medalist(s)			0.00 m (0 in)	
2nd place, silver medalist(s)			0.00 m (0 in)	
3rd place, bronze medalist(s)			0.00 m (0 in)	
4			0.00 m (0 in)	
5			0.00 m (0 in)	
6			0.00 m (0 in)	
7			0.00 m (0 in)	
8			0.00 m (0 in)	
9			0.00 m (0 in)	
10			0.00 m (0 in)	
11			0.00 m (0 in)	
12			0.00 m (0 in)	
13			0.00 m (0 in)	
14			0.00 m (0 in)	
15			0.00 m (0 in)	
16			0.00 m (0 in)	
17			0.00 m (0 in)	
18			0.00 m (0 in)	
19			0.00 m (0 in)	
20			0.00 m (0 in)	
21			0.00 m (0 in)	
22			0.00 m (0 in)	
23			0.00 m (0 in)	
24			0.00 m (0 in)	

- Results from Flash Results.

==== Pole vault ====
Rank	Athlete	Team	Mark	Notes
1st place, gold medalist(s)			0.00 m (0 in)	
2nd place, silver medalist(s)			0.00 m (0 in)	
3rd place, bronze medalist(s)			0.00 m (0 in)	
4			0.00 m (0 in)	
5			0.00 m (0 in)	
6			0.00 m (0 in)	
7			0.00 m (0 in)	
8			0.00 m (0 in)	
9			0.00 m (0 in)	
10			0.00 m (0 in)	
11			0.00 m (0 in)	
12			0.00 m (0 in)	
13			0.00 m (0 in)	
14			0.00 m (0 in)	
15			0.00 m (0 in)	
16			0.00 m (0 in)	
17			0.00 m (0 in)	
18			0.00 m (0 in)	
19			0.00 m (0 in)	
20			0.00 m (0 in)	
21			0.00 m (0 in)	
22			0.00 m (0 in)	
23			0.00 m (0 in)	
24			0.00 m (0 in)	

- Results from Flash Results.

==== Shot put ====
Rank	Athlete	Team	Mark	Notes
1st place, gold medalist(s)			0.00 m (0 in)	
2nd place, silver medalist(s)			0.00 m (0 in)	
3rd place, bronze medalist(s)			0.00 m (0 in)	
4			0.00 m (0 in)	
5			0.00 m (0 in)	
6			0.00 m (0 in)	
7			0.00 m (0 in)	
8			0.00 m (0 in)	
9			0.00 m (0 in)	
10			0.00 m (0 in)	
11			0.00 m (0 in)	
12			0.00 m (0 in)	
13			0.00 m (0 in)	
14			0.00 m (0 in)	
15			0.00 m (0 in)	
16			0.00 m (0 in)	
17			0.00 m (0 in)	
18			0.00 m (0 in)	
19			0.00 m (0 in)	
20			0.00 m (0 in)	
21			0.00 m (0 in)	
22			0.00 m (0 in)	
23			0.00 m (0 in)	
24			0.00 m (0 in)	

- Results from Flash Results.

==== Discus throw ====
Rank	Athlete	Team	Mark	Notes
1st place, gold medalist(s)			00.00 m (0 in)	
2nd place, silver medalist(s)			00.00 m (0 in)	
3rd place, bronze medalist(s)			00.00 m (0 in)	
4			00.00 m (0 in)	
5			00.00 m (0 in)	
6			00.00 m (0 in)	
7			00.00 m (0 in)	
8			00.00 m (0 in)	
9			00.00 m (0 in)	
10			00.00 m (0 in)	
11			00.00 m (0 in)	
12			00.00 m (0 in)	
13			00.00 m (0 in)	
14			00.00 m (0 in)	
15			00.00 m (0 in)	
16			00.00 m (0 in)	
17			00.00 m (0 in)	
18			00.00 m (0 in)	
19			00.00 m (0 in)	
20			00.00 m (0 in)	
21			00.00 m (0 in)	
22			00.00 m (0 in)	
23			00.00 m (0 in)	
24			00.00 m (0 in)	

- Results from Flash Results.

==== Javelin throw ====
Rank	Athlete	Team	Mark	Notes
1st place, gold medalist(s)			0.00 m (0 in)	
2nd place, silver medalist(s)			0.00 m (0 in)	
3rd place, bronze medalist(s)			0.00 m (0 in)	
4			0.00 m (0 in)	
5			0.00 m (0 in)	
6			0.00 m (0 in)	
7			0.00 m (0 in)	
8			0.00 m (0 in)	
9			0.00 m (0 in)	
10			0.00 m (0 in)	
11			0.00 m (0 in)	
12			0.00 m (0 in)	
13			0.00 m (0 in)	
14			0.00 m (0 in)	
15			0.00 m (0 in)	
16			0.00 m (0 in)	
17			0.00 m (0 in)	
18			0.00 m (0 in)	
19			0.00 m (0 in)	
20			0.00 m (0 in)	
21			0.00 m (0 in)	
22			0.00 m (0 in)	
23			0.00 m (0 in)	
24			0.00 m (0 in)	

- Results from Flash Results.

==== Hammer throw ====
Rank	Athlete	Team	Mark	Notes
1st place, gold medalist(s)			0.00 m (0 in)	
2nd place, silver medalist(s)			0.00 m (0 in)	
3rd place, bronze medalist(s)			0.00 m (0 in)	
4			0.00 m (0 in)	
5			0.00 m (0 in)	
6			0.00 m (0 in)	
7			0.00 m (0 in)	
8			0.00 m (0 in)	
9			0.00 m (0 in)	
10			0.00 m (0 in)	
11			0.00 m (0 in)	
12			0.00 m (0 in)	
13			0.00 m (0 in)	
14			0.00 m (0 in)	
15			0.00 m (0 in)	
16			0.00 m (0 in)	
17			0.00 m (0 in)	
18			0.00 m (0 in)	
19			0.00 m (0 in)	
20			0.00 m (0 in)	
21			0.00 m (0 in)	
22			0.00 m (0 in)	
23			0.00 m (0 in)	
24			0.00 m (0 in)	

- Results from Flash Results.

==== Heptathlon ====
Rank	Athlete	Team	Overall points	100 m	HJ	SP	200 m	LJ	JT	800 m
1st place, gold medalist(s)			0000	0000; 00.00	000; 0.00 m (0 in)	000; 00.00 m (0 in)	000; 00.00	000; 0.00 m (0 in)	000; 00.00 m (0 in)	000; 0:00.00
2nd place, silver medalist(s)			0000	0000; 00.00	000; 0.00 m (0 in)	000; 00.00 m (0 in)	000; 00.00	000; 0.00 m (0 in)	000; 00.00 m (0 in)	000; 0:00.00
3rd place, bronze medalist(s)			0000	0000; 00.00	000; 0.00 m (0 in)	000; 00.00 m (0 in)	000; 00.00	000; 0.00 m (0 in)	000; 00.00 m (0 in)	000; 0:00.00
4			0000	0000; 00.00	000; 0.00 m (0 in)	000; 00.00 m (0 in)	000; 00.00	000; 0.00 m (0 in)	000; 00.00 m (0 in)	000; 0:00.00
5			0000	0000; 00.00	000; 0.00 m (0 in)	000; 00.00 m (0 in)	000; 00.00	000; 0.00 m (0 in)	000; 00.00 m (0 in)	000; 0:00.00
6			0000	0000; 00.00	000; 0.00 m (0 in)	000; 00.00 m (0 in)	000; 00.00	000; 0.00 m (0 in)	000; 00.00 m (0 in)	000; 0:00.00
7			0000	0000; 00.00	000; 0.00 m (0 in)	000; 00.00 m (0 in)	000; 00.00	000; 0.00 m (0 in)	000; 00.00 m (0 in)	000; 0:00.00
8			0000	0000; 00.00	000; 0.00 m (0 in)	000; 00.00 m (0 in)	000; 00.00	000; 0.00 m (0 in)	000; 00.00 m (0 in)	000; 0:00.00
9			0000	0000; 00.00	000; 0.00 m (0 in)	000; 00.00 m (0 in)	000; 00.00	000; 0.00 m (0 in)	000; 00.00 m (0 in)	000; 0:00.00
10			0000	0000; 00.00	000; 0.00 m (0 in)	000; 00.00 m (0 in)	000; 00.00	000; 0.00 m (0 in)	000; 00.00 m (0 in)	000; 0:00.00
11			0000	0000; 00.00	000; 0.00 m (0 in)	000; 00.00 m (0 in)	000; 00.00	000; 0.00 m (0 in)	000; 00.00 m (0 in)	000; 0:00.00
12			0000	0000; 00.00	000; 0.00 m (0 in)	000; 00.00 m (0 in)	000; 00.00	000; 0.00 m (0 in)	000; 00.00 m (0 in)	000; 0:00.00
13			0000	0000; 00.00	000; 0.00 m (0 in)	000; 00.00 m (0 in)	000; 00.00	000; 0.00 m (0 in)	000; 00.00 m (0 in)	000; 0:00.00
14			0000	0000; 00.00	000; 0.00 m (0 in)	000; 00.00 m (0 in)	000; 00.00	000; 0.00 m (0 in)	000; 00.00 m (0 in)	000; 0:00.00
15			0000	0000; 00.00	000; 0.00 m (0 in)	000; 00.00 m (0 in)	000; 00.00	000; 0.00 m (0 in)	000; 00.00 m (0 in)	000; 0:00.00
16			0000	0000; 00.00	000; 0.00 m (0 in)	000; 00.00 m (0 in)	000; 00.00	000; 0.00 m (0 in)	000; 00.00 m (0 in)	000; 0:00.00
17			0000	0000; 00.00	000; 0.00 m (0 in)	000; 00.00 m (0 in)	000; 00.00	000; 0.00 m (0 in)	000; 00.00 m (0 in)	000; 0:00.00
18			0000	0000; 00.00	000; 0.00 m (0 in)	000; 00.00 m (0 in)	000; 00.00	000; 0.00 m (0 in)	000; 00.00 m (0 in)	000; 0:00.00

- Results from Flash Results.

== Standings ==
=== Men ===
- Only top ten teams shown

Rank	Team	Score	Notes
1st place, gold medalist(s)	Florida	54	
2nd place, silver medalist(s)	Texas	38	
3rd place, bronze medalist(s)	Tennessee Volunteers	34	
4	Florida State Seminoles	33	
5	Georgia	32	
6	LSU Tigers	31	
7	Princeton	27	
8	Stanford	24	
9	North Carolina A&T Aggies	22	
9	Texas Tech	22	

=== Women ===
- Only top ten teams shown

Rank	Team	Score	Notes
1st place, gold medalist(s)	Florida	74	
2nd place, silver medalist(s)	Texas	64	
3rd place, bronze medalist(s)	Kentucky	50	
4	LSU Tigers	39	
4	Texas A&M	39	
6	Arkansas	38	
7	Texas Tech	36	
8	Arizona State	28	
9	BYU	21	
9	Colorado	21	

== See also ==
- NCAA Men's Division I Outdoor Track and Field Championships
- NCAA Women's Division I Outdoor Track and Field Championships
- 2022 NCAA Division I Indoor Track and Field Championships

== Schedule ==
WEDNESDAY, JUNE 8
TRACK EVENTS
TIME PT	EVENT	ROUND DIVISION
4:32 p.m.	4x100 Relay	Semifinal Men
4:46 p.m.	1500 Meters	Semifinal Men
5:02 p.m.	3000 Steeplechase	Semifinal Men
5:32 p.m.	110 Meter Hurdles	Semifinal Men
5:46 p.m.	100 Meters	Semifinal Men
6:00 p.m.	400 Meters	Semifinal Men
6:14 p.m.	800 Meters	Semifinal Men
6:30 p.m.	400 Meter Hurdles	Semifinal Men
6:44 p.m.	200 Meters	Semifinal Men
6:56 p.m.	400 Meters	Decathlon
7:08 p.m.	10,000 Meters	Final Men
7:48 p.m.	4x400 Relay	Semifinal Men
FIELD EVENTS
TIME PT	EVENT	ROUND DIVISION
2:00 p.m.	Hammer Throw	Final Men
5:00 p.m.	Pole Vault	Final Men
5:45 p.m.	Javelin Throw	Final Men
6:00 p.m.	Long Jump	Final Men
6:40 p.m.	Shot Put	Final Men
Men Decathlon
TIME PT	EVENT	ROUND DIVISION
12:30 p.m.	100 Meters	Decathlon Men
1:10 p.m.	Long Jump	Decathlon Men
2:25 p.m.	Shot Put	Decathlon Men
3:40 p.m.	High Jump	Decathlon Men
6:56 p.m.	400 Meters	Decathlon Men
THURSDAY, JUNE 9
TRACK EVENTS
TIME PT	EVENT	ROUND DIVISION
5:32 p.m.	4x100 Relay	Semifinal Women
5:46 p.m.	1500 Meters	Semifinal Women
6:02 p.m.	3000 Steeplechase	Semifinal Women
6:32 p.m.	100 Meter Hurdles	Semifinal Women
6:46 p.m.	100 Meters	Semifinal Women
7:00 p.m.	400 Meters	Semifinal Women
7:14 p.m.	800 Meters	Semifinal Women
7:30 p.m.	400 Meter Hurdles	Semifinal Women
7:44 p.m.	200 Meters	Semifinal Women
7:56 p.m.	1500 Meters	Decathlon
8:08 p.m.	10,000 Meters	Final Women
8:48 p.m.	4x400 Relay	Semifinal Women
FIELD EVENTS
TIME PT	EVENT	ROUND DIVISION
3:00 p.m.	Hammer Throw	Final Women
6:00 p.m.	Pole Vault	Final Women
6:45 p.m.	Javelin Throw	Final Women
7:00 p.m.	Long Jump	Final Women
7:40 p.m.	Shot Put	Final Women
Men Decathlon
TIME PT	EVENT	ROUND DIVISION
11:30 a.m.	110 Hurdles	Decathlon Men
12:20 p.m.	Discus	Decathlon Men
1:30 p.m.	Pole Vault	Decathlon Men
4:00 p.m.	Javelin	Decathlon Men
7:56 p.m.	1500 Meters	Decathlon Men
FRIDAY, JUNE 10
TRACK EVENTS
TIME PT	EVENT	ROUND DIVISION
6:02 p.m.	4x100 Relay	Final Men
6:12 p.m.	1500 Meters	Final Men
6:24 p.m.	3000 Steeplechase	Final Men
6:42 p.m.	110 Meter Hurdles	Final Men
6:52 p.m.	100 Meters	Final Men
7:02 p.m.	400 Meters	Final Men
7:14 p.m.	800 Meters	Final Men
7:27 p.m.	400 Meter Hurdles	Final Men
7:37 p.m.	200 Meters	Final Men
7:43 p.m.	200 Meters	Heptathlon
7:55 p.m.	5000 Meters	Final Men
8:21 p.m.	4x400 Relay	Final Men
FIELD EVENTS
TIME PT	EVENT	ROUND DIVISION
5:30 p.m.	High Jump	Final Men
5:35 p.m.	Discus	Final Men
6:20 p.m.	Triple Jump	Final Men
Women Heptathlon
TIME PT	EVENT	ROUND DIVISION
1:00 p.m.	100 Meters	Heptathlon Women
2:00 p.m.	High Jump	Heptathlon Women
4:00 p.m.	Shot Put	Heptathlon Women
7:43 p.m.	200 Meters	Heptathlon Women
SATURDAY, JUNE 11
TRACK EVENTS
TIME PT	EVENT	ROUND DIVISION
2:32 p.m.	4x100 Relay	Final Women
2:41 p.m.	1500 Meters	Final Women
2:54 p.m.	3000 Steeplechase	Final Women
3:12 p.m.	100 Meter Hurdles	Final Women
3:22 p.m.	100 Meters	Final Women
3:32 p.m.	400 Meters	Final Women
3:44 p.m.	800 Meters	Final Women
3:57 p.m.	400 Meter Hurdles	Final Women
4:07 p.m.	200 Meters	Final Women
4:13 p.m.	800 Meters	Heptathlon
4:25 p.m.	5000 Meters	Final Women
4:51 p.m.	4x400 Relay	Final Women
FIELD EVENTS
TIME PT	EVENT	ROUND DIVISION
2:00 p.m.	High Jump	Final Women
2:05 p.m.	Discus	Final Women
2:50 p.m.	Triple Jump	Final Women
Women Heptathlon
TIME PT	EVENT	ROUND DIVISION
10:30 p.m.	Long Jump	Heptathlon Women
11:45 p.m.	Javelin	Heptathlon Women
4:13 p.m.	800 Meters	Heptathlon Women
