= 2022 NCAA Division I Indoor Track and Field Championships =

College track and field competition

- Dates: March 11–12, 2022
- Host city: Birmingham, Alabama
- Venue: Birmingham CrossPlex
- Events: 34
- Participation: 650 selected athletes

The 2022 NCAA Division I Indoor Track and Field Championships were the 57th NCAA Division I Men's Indoor Track and Field Championships and the 40th NCAA Division I Women's Indoor Track and Field Championships, held at the Birmingham CrossPlex in Birmingham, Alabama. In total, thirty-four different men's and women's indoor track and field events were contested from March 11 to March 12, 2022.

On the women's side, Florida took home the team title with 67 points, with Texas (56) and Kentucky (44) following in 2nd and 3rd. Texas won the men's title with 47 points, followed by North Carolina A&T with 36 points and Tennessee with 31.

== Streaming and TV coverage ==
ESPN streamed the event on ESPN2, ESPN3, and ESPNU. On March 13, a replay of the championships was broadcast at 9:00 PM Eastern Time on ESPNU.

== Results ==
=== Men's results ===
==== 60 meters ====
- Final results shown, not prelims

Rank	Name	University	Time	Team score
1st place, gold medalist(s)	(Jamaica) Davonte Burnett	USC	6.50 PB	10
2nd place, silver medalist(s)	(British Virgin Islands) Rikkoi Brathwaite	Indiana	6.52 PB	8
3rd place, bronze medalist(s)	(Nigeria) Favour Ashe	Tennessee	6.55	6
4	(United States) Lawrence Johnson	Wisconsin	6.56 PB	5
5	(United States) Matthew Boling	Georgia	6.63	4
6	(United States) Brendon Stewart	USC	6.64	3
7	(United States) Don'dre Swint	Florida State	6.68	2
	(United States) Kasaun James	USC	DNS	

==== 200 meters ====
- Final results shown, not prelims

Rank	Name	University	Time	Team score
1st place, gold medalist(s)	(United States) Javonte Harding	North Carolina A&T	20.46	10
2nd place, silver medalist(s)	(United States) Robert Gregory	TCU	20.77	8
3rd place, bronze medalist(s)	(Zimbabwe) Tinotenda Matiyenga	TCU	20.84	6
4	(Mexico) Daniel Stokes	North Carolina A&T	20.87 (20.861)	5
5	(United States) Lance Lang	Kentucky	20.87 (20.868)	4
6	(United States) Evan Miller	South Carolina	21.05	3
7	(United States) Jacolby Shelton	Texas Tech	21.22	2
	(United States) Matthew Boling	Georgia	DQ 7.5-2b	

==== 400 meters ====
- Final results shown, not prelims

Rank	Name	University	Time	Team score
1st place, gold medalist(s)	(United States) Randolph Ross	North Carolina A&T	44.62	10
2nd place, silver medalist(s)	(United States) Jenoah McKiver	Iowa	45.65	8
3rd place, bronze medalist(s)	(Nigeria) Emmanuel Bamidele	Texas A&M	45.78	6
4	(United States) Ryan Willie	Florida	45.96	5
5	(United States) Jacory Patterson	Florida	45.97	4
6	(United States) Chadrick Richards	Iowa	46.26	3
7	(United States) Wayne Lawrence Jr.	Iowa	46.50	2
	(United States) Champion Allison	Florida	DNF	

==== 800 meters ====
- Final results shown, not prelims

Rank	Name	University	Time	Team score
1st place, gold medalist(s)	(United States) Brandon Miller	Texas A&M	1:47.19	10
2nd place, silver medalist(s)	(Barbados) Jonathan Jones	Texas	1:47.93	8
3rd place, bronze medalist(s)	(United States) John Rivera	Ole Miss	1:48.03	6
4	(United Kingdom) Yusuf Bizimana	Texas	1:48.09	5
5	(United Kingdom) Tiarnan Crorken	Ole Miss	1:48.60	4
6	(United States) Cole Johnson	Michigan	1:48.88	3
7	(United States) Luis Peralta	Oregon	1:53.32	2
	(Morocco) Moad Zahafi	Texas Tech	DNF	

==== Mile ====
- Final results shown, not prelims

Rank	Name	University	Time	Team score
1st place, gold medalist(s)	(Spain) Mario Garcia Romo	Ole Miss	4:07.54	10
2nd place, silver medalist(s)	(United States) Morgan Beadlescomb	Michigan State	4:07.59	8
3rd place, bronze medalist(s)	(United States) Reed Brown	Oregon	4:07.64	6
4	(United States) Jonathan Davis	Illinois	4:07.69	5
5	(United States) Isaac Basten	Drake	4:07.72	4
6	(United States) Nick Dahl	Duke	4:07.78	3
7	(United States) Crayton Carrozza	Texas	4:08.03	2
8	(Kenya) Eliud Kipsang	Alabama	4:09.34	1
9	(United Kingdom) James Young	Ole Miss	4:09.57	
10	(United States) Jack Yearian	Oregon	4:09.59	

==== 3000 meters ====
- Final results shown, not prelims

Rank	Name	University	Time	Team score
1st place, gold medalist(s)	(United States) Abdihamid Nur	Northern Arizona	7:59.88	10
2nd place, silver medalist(s)	(Kenya) Amon Kemboi	Arkansas	8:00.21	8
3rd place, bronze medalist(s)	(United Kingdom) Charles Hicks	Stanford	8:00.23	6
4	(United States) Olin Hacker	Wisconsin	8:00.39	5
5	(United States) Eduardo Herrera	Colorado	8:00.58	4
6	(Spain) Antonio Lopez Segura	Virginia Tech	8:00.70	3
7	(United States) Nico Young	Northern Arizona	8:00.83	2
8	(United States) Cole Sprout	Stanford	8:00.85	1
9	(United States) Yared Nuguse	Notre Dame	8:01.53	
10	(United States) Duncan Hamilton	Montana State	8:03.98	
11	(United States) Cameron Ponder	Furman	8:03.99	
12	(United States) Morgan Beadlescomb	Michigan State	8:04.87	
13	(Kenya) Wesley Kiptoo	Iowa State	8:05.53	
14	(United States) Colton Johnsen	Washington State	8:05.62	
15	(Kenya) Athanas Kioko	Campbell	8:14.16	
16	(United States) Ben Veatch	Indiana	8:16.23	

==== 5000 meters ====
- Final results shown, not prelims

Rank	Name	University	Time	Team score
1st place, gold medalist(s)	(United States) Abdihamid Nur	Northern Arizona	13:19.01 PB MR	10
2nd place, silver medalist(s)	(Australia) Ky Robinson	Stanford	13:20.17 PB	8
3rd place, bronze medalist(s)	(United States) Nico Young	Northern Arizona	13:21.23 PB	6
4	(South Africa) Adriaan Wildschutt	Florida State	13:21.23	5
5	(United States) Cole Sprout	Stanford	13:25.67	4
6	(Republic of Ireland) Brian Fay	Washington	13:28.48	3
7	(Kenya) Amon Kemboi	Arkansas	13:29.04	2
8	(United States) Drew Bosley	Northern Arizona	13:29.69	1
9	(United States) Dylan Jacobs	Notre Dame	13:31.43	
10	(Germany) Aaron Bienenfeld	Oregon	13:32.56	
11	(Republic of Ireland) Barry Keane	Butler	13:35.01	
12	(Kenya) Wesley Kiptoo	Iowa State	13:41.71	
13	(Canada) Ehab El-Sandali	Iona	13:45.40	
14	(United States) Sam Gilman	Air Force	13:52.34	
15	(Somalia) Ahmed Muhumed	Florida State	13:58.91	
16	(United States) Alex Maier	Oklahoma State	14:02.71	

==== 60 meter hurdles ====
- Final results shown, not prelims

Rank	Name	University	Time	Team score
1st place, gold medalist(s)	(United States) Trey Cunningham	Florida State	7.38 PB	10
2nd place, silver medalist(s)	(United States) Leonard Mustari	North Carolina A&T	7.63	8
3rd place, bronze medalist(s)	(United States) Jamar Marshall Jr.	Arizona State	7.64	6
4	(Jamaica) Vashaun Vascianna	Texas Tech	7.67	5
5	(United States) Sam Brixey	Washington State	7.69 PB	4
6	(Cayman Islands) Rasheem Brown	North Carolina A&T	7.77	3
7	(United States) Darius Luff	Nebraska	7.82	2
8	(United States) Eric Edwards Jr.	LSU	8.24	1

==== 4 x 400 meters relay ====
- Final results shown, not prelims

Rank	University	Time	Team score
1st place, gold medalist(s)	Texas A&M	3:04.16 SB	10
2nd place, silver medalist(s)	Texas	3:04.55	8
3rd place, bronze medalist(s)	Kentucky	3:04.64	6
4	Georgia	3:05.46	5
5	Tennessee	3:05.89	4
6	Arkansas	3:05.96	3
7	Florida	3:06.19	2
8	USC	3:06.21	1
9	North Carolina A&T	3:06.91	
10	Miss State	3:07.74	
11	Baylor	3:08.59	
12	Iowa	3:09.79	

==== Distance medley relay ====
- Final results shown, not prelims

Rank	University	Time	Team score
1st place, gold medalist(s)	Texas	9:25.20	10
2nd place, silver medalist(s)	Notre Dame	9:25.77	8
3rd place, bronze medalist(s)	Wisconsin	9:25.78	6
4	Princeton	9:26.01	5
5	Oklahoma State	9:28.11	4
6	Iowa State	9:28.62	3
7	Washington	9:29.27	2
8	Michigan	9:30.46	1
9	Arkansas	9:30.86	
10	Indiana	9:33.27	
11	Ole Miss	9:35.94	
12	Alabama	9:40.85	

==== High jump ====
- Final results shown, not prelims

Rank	Name	University	Best jump	Team score
1st place, gold medalist(s)	(United States) Vernon Turner	Oklahoma	2.32 m (7 ft 7 1/4 in) SB	10
2nd place, silver medalist(s)	(United States) Corvell Todd	Southern Miss	2.29 m (7 ft 6 in) PB	8
3rd place, bronze medalist(s)	(United States) Dontavious Hill	Auburn	2.20 m (7 ft 2 1/2 in)	5.5
3rd place, bronze medalist(s)	(United States) Justin Stuckey	Samford	2.20 m (7 ft 2 1/2 in) PB	5.5
5	(Mexico) Roberto Vilches	Missouri	2.20 m (7 ft 2 1/2 in)	4
6	(India) Tejaswin Shankar	Kansas State	2.20 m (7 ft 2 1/2 in)	3
7	(Nigeria) Omamuyowi Erhire	Middle Tennessee State	2.20 m (7 ft 2 1/2 in)	2
8	(United States) Trey Allen	Louisville	2.20 m (7 ft 2 1/2 in) PB	1
9	(United States) Caleb Wilborn	Texas Tech	0.00 m (0 in)	
9	(United States) Bryson DeBerry		0.00 m (0 in)	
9	(United States) Ethan Harris	Grand Canyon	0.00 m (0 in)	
9	(United States) Earnie Sears III	USC	2.20 m (7 ft 2 1/2 in)	
13	(United States) Kennedy Sauder	Liberty	0.00 m (0 in)	
13	(United States) Mayson Conner	Nebraska	2.14 m (7 ft 1/4 in)	
15	(Jamaica) Romaine Beckford	South Florida	2.10 m (6 ft 10 1/2 in)	
16	(United States) Brandon Burke	Buffalo	NH	

==== Pole vault ====
- Final results shown, not prelims

Rank	Name	University	Best jump	Team score
1st place, gold medalist(s)	Sondre Guttormsen	Princeton	5.75 m (18 ft 10 1/4 in)	10
2nd place, silver medalist(s)	Zach McWhorter	BYU	5.70 m (18 ft 8 1/4 in)	8
3rd place, bronze medalist(s)	Clayton Fritsch	Sam Houston	5.70 m (18 ft 8 1/4 in)	6
4	Simen Guttormsen	Princeton	5.60 m (18 ft 4 1/4 in)	5
5	Branson Ellis	Stephen F. Austin	5.60 m (18 ft 4 1/4 in)	4
6	Kyle Rademeyer	South Alabama	5.60 m (18 ft 4 1/4 in)	3
7	Zach Bradford	Kansas	5.55 m (18 ft 2 1/2 in)	2
8	Clayton Simms	Kansas	5.50 m (18 ft 1/2 in)	1
9	Luke Bendick	Ohio State	5.45 m (17 ft 10 1/2 in)	
10	Caleb Witsken	BYU	5.45 m (17 ft 10 1/2 in)	
11	Eerik Haamer	South Dakota	5.45 m (17 ft 10 1/2 in)	
12	Keaton Daniel	Kentucky	5.35 m (17 ft 6 1/2 in)	
13	Christyan Sampy	Houston	5.35 m (17 ft 6 1/2 in)	
14	Trevor Stephenson	Michigan State	5.35 m (17 ft 6 1/2 in)	
-	Nathan Stone	Indiana	NH	
-	Trent Francom	South Dakota State	NH	

==== Long jump ====
- Final results shown, not prelims

Rank	Name	University	Best jump	Team score
1st place, gold medalist(s)	(Jamaica) Wayne Pinnock	Tennessee	7.92 m (25 ft 11 3/4 in) PB	10
2nd place, silver medalist(s)	(Jamaica) Carey McLeod	Tennessee	7.91 m (25 ft 11 1/4 in)	8
3rd place, bronze medalist(s)	(United States) Matthew Boling	Georgia	7.86 m (25 ft 9 1/4 in)	6
4	(United States) A'Nan Bridgett	Rutgers	7.80 m (25 ft 7 in)	5
5	(Nigeria) Emmanuel Ineh	Alabama	7.71 m (25 ft 3 1/2 in)	4
6	(United States) Cameron Crump	Miss State	7.65 m (25 ft 1 in)	3
7	(United States) Johnny Brackins	Baylor	7.60 m (24 ft 11 in)	2
8	(Jamaica) Ryan Brown	Arkansas	7.45 m (24 ft 5 1/4 in)	1
9	(United States) Brandon Hicklin	North Carolina A&T	7.39 m (24 ft 2 3/4 in)	
10	(United States) Sincere Robinson	Rutgers	7.22 m (23 ft 8 1/4 in)	
11	(United States) Isaiah Holmes	Miami (FL)	7.15 m (23 ft 5 1/4 in)	
12	(United States) Ja'Von Douglas	NC State	7.10 m (23 ft 3 1/2 in)	
13	(United States) Stacy Brown Jr.	Texas	7.08 m (23 ft 2 1/2 in)	
14	(United States) John Baker	Arkansas	6.78 m (22 ft 2 3/4 in)	
15	(United States) Isaac Grimes	Florida State	DNS	
16	(United States) Rayvon Allen	Oklahoma	DNS	

==== Triple jump ====
- Final results shown, not prelims

Rank	Name	University	Best jump	Team score
1st place, gold medalist(s)			00.00 m (0 in)	10
2nd place, silver medalist(s)			00.00 m (0 in)	8
3rd place, bronze medalist(s)			00.00 m (0 in)	6
4			00.00 m (0 in)	5
5			00.00 m (0 in)	4
6			00.00 m (0 in)	3
7			00.00 m (0 in)	2
8			00.00 m (0 in)	1
9			00.00 m (0 in)	
10			00.00 m (0 in)	
11			00.00 m (0 in)	
12			00.00 m (0 in)	
13			00.00 m (0 in)	
14			00.00 m (0 in)	
15			00.00 m (0 in)	
16			00.00 m (0 in)	

==== Shot put ====
- Final results shown, not prelims

Rank	Name	University	Best throw	Team score
1st place, gold medalist(s)			00.00 m (0 in)	10
2nd place, silver medalist(s)			00.00 m (0 in)	8
3rd place, bronze medalist(s)			00.00 m (0 in)	6
4			00.00 m (0 in)	5
5			00.00 m (0 in)	4
6			00.00 m (0 in)	3
7			00.00 m (0 in)	2
8			00.00 m (0 in)	1
9			00.00 m (0 in)	
10			00.00 m (0 in)	
11			00.00 m (0 in)	
12			00.00 m (0 in)	
13			00.00 m (0 in)	
14			00.00 m (0 in)	
15			00.00 m (0 in)	
16			00.00 m (0 in)	

==== Weight throw ====
- Final results shown, not prelims

Rank	Name	University	Best throw	Team score
1st place, gold medalist(s)			00.00 m (0 in)	10
2nd place, silver medalist(s)			00.00 m (0 in)	8
3rd place, bronze medalist(s)			00.00 m (0 in)	6
4			00.00 m (0 in)	5
5			00.00 m (0 in)	4
6			00.00 m (0 in)	3
7			00.00 m (0 in)	2
8			00.00 m (0 in)	1
9			00.00 m (0 in)	
10			00.00 m (0 in)	
11			00.00 m (0 in)	
12			00.00 m (0 in)	
13			00.00 m (0 in)	
14			00.00 m (0 in)	
15			00.00 m (0 in)	
16			00.00 m (0 in)	

==== Heptathlon ====
- Final results shown, not prelims

Rank	Name	University	Overall points	60 m	LJ	SP	HJ	60 m H	PV	1000 m
1st place, gold medalist(s)			0000	000; 0.00	000; 0.00 m (0 in)	000; 0.00 m (0 in)	000; 0.00 m (0 in)	000; 0.00	000; 0.00 m (0 in)	000; 0:00.00
2nd place, silver medalist(s)			0000	000; 0.00	000; 0.00 m (0 in)	000; 0.00 m (0 in)	000; 0.00 m (0 in)	000; 0.00	000; 0.00 m (0 in)	000; 0:00.00
3rd place, bronze medalist(s)			0000	000; 0.00	000; 0.00 m (0 in)	000; 0.00 m (0 in)	000; 0.00 m (0 in)	000; 0.00	000; 0.00 m (0 in)	000; 0:00.00
4			0000	000; 0.00	000; 0.00 m (0 in)	000; 0.00 m (0 in)	000; 0.00 m (0 in)	000; 0.00	000; 0.00 m (0 in)	000; 0:00.00
5			0000	000; 0.00	000; 0.00 m (0 in)	000; 0.00 m (0 in)	000; 0.00 m (0 in)	000; 0.00	000; 0.00 m (0 in)	000; 0:00.00
6			0000	000; 0.00	000; 0.00 m (0 in)	000; 0.00 m (0 in)	000; 0.00 m (0 in)	000; 0.00	000; 0.00 m (0 in)	000; 0:00.00
7			0000	000; 0.00	000; 0.00 m (0 in)	000; 0.00 m (0 in)	000; 0.00 m (0 in)	000; 0.00	000; 0.00 m (0 in)	000; 0:00.00
8			0000	000; 0.00	000; 0.00 m (0 in)	000; 0.00 m (0 in)	000; 0.00 m (0 in)	000; 0.00	000; 0.00 m (0 in)	000; 0:00.00
9			0000	000; 0.00	000; 0.00 m (0 in)	000; 0.00 m (0 in)	000; 0.00 m (0 in)	000; 0.00	000; 0.00 m (0 in)	000; 0:00.00
10			0000	000; 0.00	000; 0.00 m (0 in)	000; 0.00 m (0 in)	000; 0.00 m (0 in)	000; 0.00	000; 0.00 m (0 in)	000; 0:00.00
11			0000	000; 0.00	000; 0.00 m (0 in)	000; 0.00 m (0 in)	000; 0.00 m (0 in)	000; 0.00	000; 0.00 m (0 in)	000; 0:00.00
12			0000	000; 0.00	000; 0.00 m (0 in)	000; 0.00 m (0 in)	000; 0.00 m (0 in)	000; 0.00	000; 0.00 m (0 in)	000; 0:00.00
13			0000	000; 0.00	000; 0.00 m (0 in)	000; 0.00 m (0 in)	000; 0.00 m (0 in)	000; 0.00	000; 0.00 m (0 in)	000; 0:00.00
14			0000	000; 0.00	000; 0.00 m (0 in)	000; 0.00 m (0 in)	000; 0.00 m (0 in)	000; 0.00	000; 0.00 m (0 in)	000; 0:00.00
15			0000	000; 0.00	000; 0.00 m (0 in)	000; 0.00 m (0 in)	000; 0.00 m (0 in)	000; 0.00	000; 0.00 m (0 in)	000; 0:00.00
16			0000	000; 0.00	000; 0.00 m (0 in)	000; 0.00 m (0 in)	000; 0.00 m (0 in)	000; 0.00	000; 0.00 m (0 in)	000; 0:00.00

=== Men's team scores ===
- Top 10 and ties shown

Rank	University	Team score
1st place, gold medalist(s)	Texas	47 points
2nd place, silver medalist(s)	North Carolina A&T	36 points
3rd place, bronze medalist(s)	Tennessee	31 points
4	Northern Arizona	29 points
5	Texas A&M	26 points
5	Princeton	26 points
7	Arkansas	24 points
8	Georgia	23 points
9	Oregon	22 points
10	TCU	20 points
10	Ole Miss	20 points

=== Women's results ===
==== 60 meters ====
- Final results shown, not prelims

Rank	Name	University	Time	Team score
1st place, gold medalist(s)	Melissa Jefferson	Coastal Carolina	7.09	10
2nd place, silver medalist(s)	Abby Steiner	Kentucky	7.10	8
3rd place, bronze medalist(s)	Jadyn Mays	Oregon	7.11	6
4	Grace Stark	Florida	7.13	5
5	Julien Alfred	Texas	7.15	4
6	Semira Killebrew	Florida	7.18	3
7	Favour Ofili	LSU	7.25	2
8	Rhasidat Adeleke	Texas	7.26	1

==== 200 meters ====
- Final results shown, not prelims

Rank	Name	University	Time	Team score
1st place, gold medalist(s)	Abby Steiner	Kentucky	22.16	10
2nd place, silver medalist(s)	Favour Ofili	LSU	22.50	8
3rd place, bronze medalist(s)	Anavia Battle	Ohio State	22.63	6
4	Rhasidat Adeleke	Texas	22.88	5
5	Kynnedy Flannel	Texas	23.22	4
6	Karimah Davis	Texas	23.23	3
7	Laila Owens	Texas A&M	23.49	2
8	Julien Alfred	Texas	23.54	1

==== 400 meters ====
- Final results shown, not prelims

Rank	Name	University	Time	Team score
1st place, gold medalist(s)	Talitha Diggs	Florida	50.98	10
2nd place, silver medalist(s)	Kennedy Simon	Texas	51.46	8
3rd place, bronze medalist(s)	Stacey-Ann Williams	Texas	51.49	6
4	Alexis Holmes	Kentucky	51.50	5
5	Jan'Taijah Ford	USC	51.51	4
6	Britton Wilson	Arkansas	51.52	3
7	Charokee Young	Texas A&M	51.61	2
8	Lauren Gale	Colorado State	51.64	1

==== 800 meters ====
- Final results shown, not prelims

Rank	Name	University	Time	Team score
1st place, gold medalist(s)	(United States) Lindsey Butler	Virginia Tech	2:01.37	10
2nd place, silver medalist(s)	(United States) Claire Seymour	BYU	2:01.96	8
3rd place, bronze medalist(s)	(United States) McKenna Keegan	Villanova	2:02.70	6
4	(United States) Valery Tobias	Texas	2:03.39	5
5	(United States) Kassidy Johnson	Kansas State	2:03.93	4
6	(Saint Vincent and the Grenadines) Shafiqua Maloney	Arkansas	2:05.09	3
7	(Canada) Aurora Rynda	Michigan	2:06.33	2
8	(United States) Sarah Hendrick	Kennesaw State	2:06.61	1

==== Mile ====
- Final results shown, not prelims

Rank	Name	University	Time	Team score
1st place, gold medalist(s)	(United States) Micaela Degenero	Colorado	4:33.92 PB	10
2nd place, silver medalist(s)	(Italy) Sintayehu Vissa	Ole Miss	4:35.40	8
3rd place, bronze medalist(s)	(England) Ellie Leather	Cincinnati	4:35.62	6
4	(United States) Rachel McArthur	Colorado	4:35.66	5
5	(United States) Olivia Howell	Illinois	4:36.86	4
6	(Kenya) Eusila Chepkemei	Middle Tennessee	4:37.21	3
7	(United States) Julia Heymach	Stanford	4:37.28	2
8	(United States) Madison Boreman	Colorado	4:38.32	1
9	(United States) Katie Camarena	Portland State	4:41.93	
10	(United States) Mia Barnett	Virginia	4:42.91	

==== 3000 meters ====
- Final results shown, not prelims

Rank	Name	University	Time	Team score
1st place, gold medalist(s)	(United States) Taylor Roe	Oklahoma State	8:58.95	10
2nd place, silver medalist(s)	(United States) Katelyn Tuohy	NC State	8:59.20	8
3rd place, bronze medalist(s)	(United States) Lauren Gregory	Arkansas	8:59.50	6
4	(Australia) Lauren Ryan	Florida State	9:01.37	5
5	(United States) Courtney Wayment	BYU	9:01.77	4
6	(United States) Samantha Bush	NC State	9:02.26	3
7	(United States) Kelsey Chmiel	NC State	9:04.77	2
8	(Canada) Ceili McCabe	West Virginia	9:05.09	1
9	(Canada) Grace Fetherstonhaugh	Oregon State	9:05.13	
10	(Kenya) Mercy Chelangat	Alabama	9:08.13	
11	(United States) Nicole Fegans	Georgia Tech	9:08.41	
12	(Germany) (United States) Kaylee Mitchell	Oregon State	9:08.58	
13	(United States) Katie Camarena	Portland State	9:09.43	
14	(United States) Alexandra Hays	NC State	9:09.82	
15	(United States) Emily Mackay	Binghamton	9:11.29	
16	(United States) Tori Herman	Kentucky	9:13.70	

==== 5000 meters ====
- Final results shown, not prelims

Rank	Name	University	Time	Team score
1st place, gold medalist(s)	(United States) Courtney Wayment	BYU	15:30.17	10
2nd place, silver medalist(s)	(United States) Katelyn Tuohy	NC State	15:30.63	8
3rd place, bronze medalist(s)	(Kenya) Mercy Chelangat	Alabama	15:31.06	6
4	(United States) Lauren Gregory	Arkansas	15:32.95	5
5	(United States) Kelsey Chmiel	NC State	15:36.98	4
6	(United States) Jenna Magness	Michigan State	15:37.43	3
7	(Australia) Amelia Mazza-Downie	New Mexico	15:37.87	2
8	(Canada) Gracelyn Larkin	New Mexico	15:44.21	1
9	(United States) Alexandra Hays	NC State	15:46.25	
10	(United States) Emily Covert	Colorado	15:56.66	
11	(United States) Haley Herberg	Washington	15:58.80	
12	(Australia) Ruby Smee	San Francisco	16:02.77	
13	(Israel) Adva Cohen	New Mexico	16:08.97	
14	(Germany) Emma Heckel	New Mexico	16:09.63	
15	(United States) Kayley Delay	Yale	16:19.14	
16	(United States) Maddy Denner	Notre Dame	16:47.28	

==== 60 meter hurdles ====
- Final results shown, not prelims

Rank	Name	University	Time	Team score
1st place, gold medalist(s)	(United States) Grace Stark	Florida	7.78	10
2nd place, silver medalist(s)	(United States) Masai Russell	Kentucky	7.943	8
3rd place, bronze medalist(s)	(United States) Rayniah Jones	UCF	7.947	6
4	(United States) Leah Phillips	LSU	8.01	5
5	(United States) Mecca McGlaston	USC	8.03	4
6	(United States) Jasmine Jones	USC	DNF	
7	(United States) Paula Salmon	North Carolina A&T	DNF	
8	(United States) Alia Armstrong	LSU	FS	

==== 4 x 400 meters relay ====
- Final results shown, not prelims

Rank	University	Time	Team score
1st place, gold medalist(s)	Arkansas	3:27.23	10
2nd place, silver medalist(s)	Texas	3:28.60	8
3rd place, bronze medalist(s)	Kentucky	3:28.77	6
4	USC	3:33.03	5
5	South Carolina	3:33.08	4
6	UCLA	3:33.32	3
7	LSU	3:33.81	2
8	Iowa	03:35.03	1
9	Baylor	3:35.79	
10	Texas A&M	3:36.92	
11	Oregon	3:37.71	

==== Distance medley relay ====
- Final results shown, not prelims

Rank	University	Time	Team score
1st place, gold medalist(s)	Arkansas	10:51.37 SB CL FR	10
2nd place, silver medalist(s)	Stanford	10:53.37 SB	8
3rd place, bronze medalist(s)	Oregon	10:55.52 SB	6
4	Oregon State	10:58.76	5
5	Kentucky	11:02.41 SB	4
6	Ole Miss	11:04.86	3
7	Virginia	11:04.88	2
8	Notre Dame	11:05.60	1
9	BYU	11:06.64	
10	Virginia Tech	11:08.43	
11	Washington	11:11.58	
	NC State	DQ(7.5-3a)	

==== High jump ====
- Final results shown, not prelims

Rank	Name	University	Best jump	Team score
1st place, gold medalist(s)		[[|]]	0.00 m (0 in)	10
2nd place, silver medalist(s)		[[|]]	0.00 m (0 in)	8
3rd place, bronze medalist(s)		[[|]]	0.00 m (0 in)	6
4		[[|]]	0.00 m (0 in)	5
5		[[|]]	0.00 m (0 in)	4
6		[[|]]	0.00 m (0 in)	3
7		[[|]]	0.00 m (0 in)	2
8		[[|]]	0.00 m (0 in)	1
9		[[|]]	0.00 m (0 in)	
10		[[|]]	0.00 m (0 in)	
11		[[|]]	0.00 m (0 in)	
12		[[|]]	0.00 m (0 in)	
13		[[|]]	0.00 m (0 in)	
14		[[|]]	0.00 m (0 in)	
15		[[|]]	0.00 m (0 in)	
16		[[|]]	0.00 m (0 in)	

==== Pole vault ====
- Final results shown, not prelims

Rank	Name	University	Best jump	Team score
1st place, gold medalist(s)		[[|]]	0.00 m (0 in)	10
2nd place, silver medalist(s)		[[|]]	0.00 m (0 in)	8
3rd place, bronze medalist(s)		[[|]]	0.00 m (0 in)	6
4		[[|]]	0.00 m (0 in)	5
5		[[|]]	0.00 m (0 in)	4
6		[[|]]	0.00 m (0 in)	3
7		[[|]]	0.00 m (0 in)	2
8		[[|]]	0.00 m (0 in)	1
9		[[|]]	0.00 m (0 in)	
10		[[|]]	0.00 m (0 in)	
11		[[|]]	0.00 m (0 in)	
12		[[|]]	0.00 m (0 in)	
13		[[|]]	0.00 m (0 in)	
14		[[|]]	0.00 m (0 in)	
15		[[|]]	0.00 m (0 in)	
16		[[|]]	0.00 m (0 in)	

==== Long jump ====
- Final results shown, not prelims

Rank	Name	University	Best jump	Team score
1st place, gold medalist(s)		[[|]]	0.00 m (0 in)	10
2nd place, silver medalist(s)		[[|]]	0.00 m (0 in)	8
3rd place, bronze medalist(s)		[[|]]	0.00 m (0 in)	6
4		[[|]]	0.00 m (0 in)	5
5		[[|]]	0.00 m (0 in)	4
6		[[|]]	0.00 m (0 in)	3
7		[[|]]	0.00 m (0 in)	2
8		[[|]]	0.00 m (0 in)	1
9		[[|]]	0.00 m (0 in)	
10		[[|]]	0.00 m (0 in)	
11		[[|]]	0.00 m (0 in)	
12		[[|]]	0.00 m (0 in)	
13		[[|]]	0.00 m (0 in)	
14		[[|]]	0.00 m (0 in)	
15		[[|]]	0.00 m (0 in)	
16		[[|]]	0.00 m (0 in)	

==== Triple jump ====
- Final results shown, not prelims

Rank	Name	University	Best jump	Team score
1st place, gold medalist(s)		[[|]]	0.00 m (0 in)	10
2nd place, silver medalist(s)		[[|]]	0.00 m (0 in)	8
3rd place, bronze medalist(s)		[[|]]	0.00 m (0 in)	6
4		[[|]]	0.00 m (0 in)	5
5		[[|]]	0.00 m (0 in)	4
6		[[|]]	0.00 m (0 in)	3
7		[[|]]	0.00 m (0 in)	2
8		[[|]]	0.00 m (0 in)	1
9		[[|]]	0.00 m (0 in)	
10		[[|]]	0.00 m (0 in)	
11		[[|]]	0.00 m (0 in)	
12		[[|]]	0.00 m (0 in)	
13		[[|]]	0.00 m (0 in)	
14		[[|]]	0.00 m (0 in)	
15		[[|]]	0.00 m (0 in)	
16		[[|]]	0.00 m (0 in)	

==== Shot put ====
- Final results shown, not prelims

Rank	Name	University	Best throw	Team score
1st place, gold medalist(s)		[[|]]	0.00 m (0 in)	10
2nd place, silver medalist(s)		[[|]]	0.00 m (0 in)	8
3rd place, bronze medalist(s)		[[|]]	0.00 m (0 in)	6
4		[[|]]	0.00 m (0 in)	5
5		[[|]]	0.00 m (0 in)	4
6		[[|]]	0.00 m (0 in)	3
7		[[|]]	0.00 m (0 in)	2
8		[[|]]	0.00 m (0 in)	1
9		[[|]]	0.00 m (0 in)	
10		[[|]]	0.00 m (0 in)	
11		[[|]]	0.00 m (0 in)	
12		[[|]]	0.00 m (0 in)	
13		[[|]]	0.00 m (0 in)	
14		[[|]]	0.00 m (0 in)	
15		[[|]]	0.00 m (0 in)	
16		[[|]]	0.00 m (0 in)	

==== Weight throw ====
- Final results shown, not prelims

Rank	Name	University	Best throw	Team score
1st place, gold medalist(s)		[[|]]	0.00 m (0 in)	10
2nd place, silver medalist(s)		[[|]]	0.00 m (0 in)	8
3rd place, bronze medalist(s)		[[|]]	0.00 m (0 in)	6
4		[[|]]	0.00 m (0 in)	5
5		[[|]]	0.00 m (0 in)	4
6		[[|]]	0.00 m (0 in)	3
7		[[|]]	0.00 m (0 in)	2
8		[[|]]	0.00 m (0 in)	1
9		[[|]]	0.00 m (0 in)	
10		[[|]]	0.00 m (0 in)	
11		[[|]]	0.00 m (0 in)	
12		[[|]]	0.00 m (0 in)	
13		[[|]]	0.00 m (0 in)	
14		[[|]]	0.00 m (0 in)	
15		[[|]]	0.00 m (0 in)	
16		[[|]]	0.00 m (0 in)	

==== Pentathlon ====
- Final results shown, not prelims

Rank	Name	University	Overall points	60 m H	HJ	SP	LJ	800 m	Team Points
1st place, gold medalist(s)	Anna Hall	Florida	4586	8.25	1.81 m (5 ft 11 1/4 in)	13.16 m (43 ft 2 in)	5.84 m (19 ft 1 3/4 in)	2:08.75	10
2nd place, silver medalist(s)	Erin Marsh	Duke	4383	8.25	1.75 m (5 ft 8 3/4 in)	12.86 m (42 ft 2 1/4 in)	5.95 m (19 ft 6 1/4 in)	2:18.63	8
3rd place, bronze medalist(s)	Lexie Keller	Colorado State	4321	8.40	1.69 m (5 ft 6 1/2 in)	13.36 m (43 ft 9 3/4 in)	5.99 m (19 ft 7 3/4 in)	2:18.58	6
4	Jadin O'Brien	Notre Dame	4212	8.50	0.00 m (0 in)	0.00 m (0 in)	0.00 m (0 in)	0:00.00	5
5	Halley Folsom	BYU	4201	8.69	0.00 m (0 in)	0.00 m (0 in)	0.00 m (0 in)	0:00.00	4
6	Kristine Blazevica	Texas	4197	8.54	0.00 m (0 in)	0.00 m (0 in)	0.00 m (0 in)	0:00.00	3
7	Isabel Wakefield	Duke	4176	8.17	0.00 m (0 in)	0.00 m (0 in)	0.00 m (0 in)	0:00.00	2
8	Avery McMullen	Colorado	4176	8.28	0.00 m (0 in)	0.00 m (0 in)	0.00 m (0 in)	0:00.00	1
9	Shayla Broughton	Miss State	4151	8.28	0.00 m (0 in)	0.00 m (0 in)	0.00 m (0 in)	0:00.00	
9	Sterling Lester	Florida	4151	8.41	0.00 m (0 in)	0.00 m (0 in)	0.00 m (0 in)	0:00.00	
11	Beatrice Juskeviciute	Cornell	4116	8.51	0.00 m (0 in)	0.00 m (0 in)	0.00 m (0 in)	0:00.00	
12	Kaitlin Smith	Houston Christian	4115	8.50	0.00 m (0 in)	0.00 m (0 in)	0.00 m (0 in)	0:00.00	
13	Jade Bontke	UT Arlington	4031	8.91	0.00 m (0 in)	0.00 m (0 in)	0.00 m (0 in)	0:00.00	
14	Izzy Goudros	Harvard	3902	8.67	0.00 m (0 in)	0.00 m (0 in)	0.00 m (0 in)	0:00.00	
15	Maddie Meiner	Oklahoma State	3863	8.72	0.00 m (0 in)	0.00 m (0 in)	0.00 m (0 in)	0:00.00	
16	Charity Griffith	Ball State	2716	11.43	1.72 m (5 ft 7 1/2 in)	11.37 m (37 ft 3 1/2 in)	5.67 m (18 ft 7 in)	NT	

=== Women's team scores ===
- Top 10 and ties shown

Rank	University	Team score
1st place, gold medalist(s)	Florida	68 points
2nd place, silver medalist(s)	Texas	56 points
3rd place, bronze medalist(s)	Kentucky	44 points
4	Arkansas	40 points
5	LSU	29.5 points
6	Virginia Tech	29 points
6	Ole Miss	00 points
8	BYU	26.2 points
9	NC State	25 points
10	Texas A&M	24 points

== Schedule ==
Men
Friday, March 11
Track events
Time CT	Event	Round Division
4:00 p.m.	Mile	Semifinal Men
4:15 p.m.	60 meters	Semifinal Men
4:25 p.m.	400 meters	Semifinal Men
4:45 p.m.	800 meters	Semifinal Men
4:55 p.m.	60 meter hurdles	Semifinal Men
5:05 p.m.	5000 meters	Final Men
5:25 p.m.	200 meters	Semifinal Men
5:45 p.m.	Distance medley relay	Final Men
Field events
Time CT	Event	Round Division
3:00 p.m.	Pole vault	Final Men
4:00 p.m.	Long jump	Final Men
4:00 p.m.	Weight throw	Final Men
Men Heptathlon
Time CT	Event	Round Division
10:00 a.m.	60 meters	Heptathlon Men
11:00 a.m.	Long jump	Heptathlon Men
12:15 p.m.	Shot put	Heptathlon Men
1:30 p.m.	High jump	Heptathlon Men
Saturday, March 12
Track events
Time CT	Event	Round Division
4:00 p.m.	Mile	Final Men
4:10 p.m.	60 meters	Final Men
4:20 p.m.	400 meters	Final Men
4:30 p.m.	800 meters	Final Men
4:40 p.m.	60 meter hurdles	Final Men
4:50 p.m.	200 meters	Final Men
5:00 p.m.	3000 meters	Final Men
5:20 p.m.	4x400 meters relay	Final Men
Field events
Time CT	Event	Round Division
12:30 p.m.	High jump	Final Men
3:45 p.m.	Triple jump	Final Men
4:00 p.m.	Shot put	Final Men
Men Heptathlon
Time CT	Event	Round Division
10:30 a.m.	60 hurdles	Heptathlon Men
11:30 a.m.	Pole vault	Heptathlon Men
3:30 p.m.	1000 meters	Heptathlon Men

Women
Friday, March 11
Track events
Time CT	Event	Round Division
7:00 p.m.	Mile	Semifinal Women
7:15 p.m.	60 meters	Semifinal Women
7:25 p.m.	400 meters	Semifinal Women
7:45 p.m.	800 meters	Semifinal Women
7:55 p.m.	60 meter hurdles	Semifinal Women
8:05 p.m.	5000 meters	Final Women
8:25 p.m.	200 meters	Semifinal Women
8:45 p.m.	Distance medley relay	Final Women
Field events
Time CT	Event	Round Division
6:45 p.m.	Pole vault	Final Women
7:00 p.m.	Long jump	Final Women
7:00 p.m.	Weight throw	Final Women
Women Pentathlon
Time CT	Event	Round Division
10:20 a.m.	60 meters	Pentathlon Women
11:30 a.m.	High jump	Pentathlon Women
1:30 p.m.	Shot put	Pentathlon Women
2:30 p.m.	Long jump	Pentathlon Women
3:40 p.m.	800 meters	Pentathlon Women
Saturday, March 12
Track events
Time CT	Event	Round Division
7:00 p.m.	Mile	Final Women
7:10 p.m.	60 meters	Final Women
7:20 p.m.	400 meters	Final Women
7:30 p.m.	800 meters	Final Women
7:40 p.m.	60 meter hurdles	Final Women
7:50 p.m.	200 meters	Final Women
8:00 p.m.	3000 meters	Final Women
8:20 p.m.	4x400 meters relay	Final Women
Field events
Time CT	Event	Round Division
12:30 p.m.	High jump	Final Women
6:45 p.m.	Triple jump	Final Women
7:00 p.m.	Shot put	Final Women

== See also ==
- National Collegiate Athletic Association (NCAA)
- NCAA Men's Division I Indoor Track and Field Championships
- NCAA Women's Division I Indoor Track and Field Championships
