= Drew Bosley =

American long-distance runner

Personal information
- Born: October 8, 2000 (age 25)

Sport
- Sport: Athletics
- Events: Long distance running, Cross country running

Achievements and titles
- Personal bests: 1500m: 3:39.32 (Azusa, 2022); Mile: 3:59.34 (Seattle, 2022); 3000m: 7:36.42 (Boston, 2023); 5000m: 13:13.26 (Boston, 2022); 10,000m: 27:53.48 (Palo Alto, 2025)

Drew Bosley (born October 8, 2000) is an American long-distance and cross country runner. He won three consecutive NCAA cross country titles with Northern Arizona University. In 2023, he was the American collegiate indoors record holder over 3000 metres.

== Career ==
Bosley attended Homestead High School in Wisconsin where he won two straight Division I state titles in cross country, before studying at Northern Arizona University from 2019.

Bosley was the first finisher for NAU at the 2019 NCAA Cross Country Championship, ahead of fellow true freshman Cole Hocker and redshirt freshmen Dylan Jacobs and Abdihamid Nur. Bosley won his third consecutive NCAA Cross Country team title with Northern Arizona in November 2022, finishing third individually. The following year, in his final NCAA cross country appearance in 2023, he placed fifth individually as NAU placed second overall. In 2023, he ran 7:36.42 at the John Thomas Terrier Classic, in Boston, Massachusetts, to set a new indoor collegiate record over 3000 metres, although that record was broken the following year by Ethan Strand.

Bosley missed most of 2024 with injury and later turned professional, training under Mike Smith with the Nike Swoosh Track Club Flagstaff, based in Flagstaff, Arizona, and placed seventh over 10,000 metres at the 2025 USA Outdoor Track and Field Championships in June 2025 in Eugene, Oregon. On 1 November 2025, Bisley placed fifth on the road at the Abbot Dash 5k in New York City.

On 23 July 2026, Bosley placed third in the 10,000 metres title at the 2026 USA Outdoor Track and Field Championships in New York.

== Personal life ==
His parents, Andy and Laura Bosley, both competed in athletics at the collegiate level at the University of Wisconsin and Wisconsin-Parkside, respectively. His father coached at Homestead High School in Wisconsin and coached Bosley at the junior level.
