= Olin Hacker =

American athlete

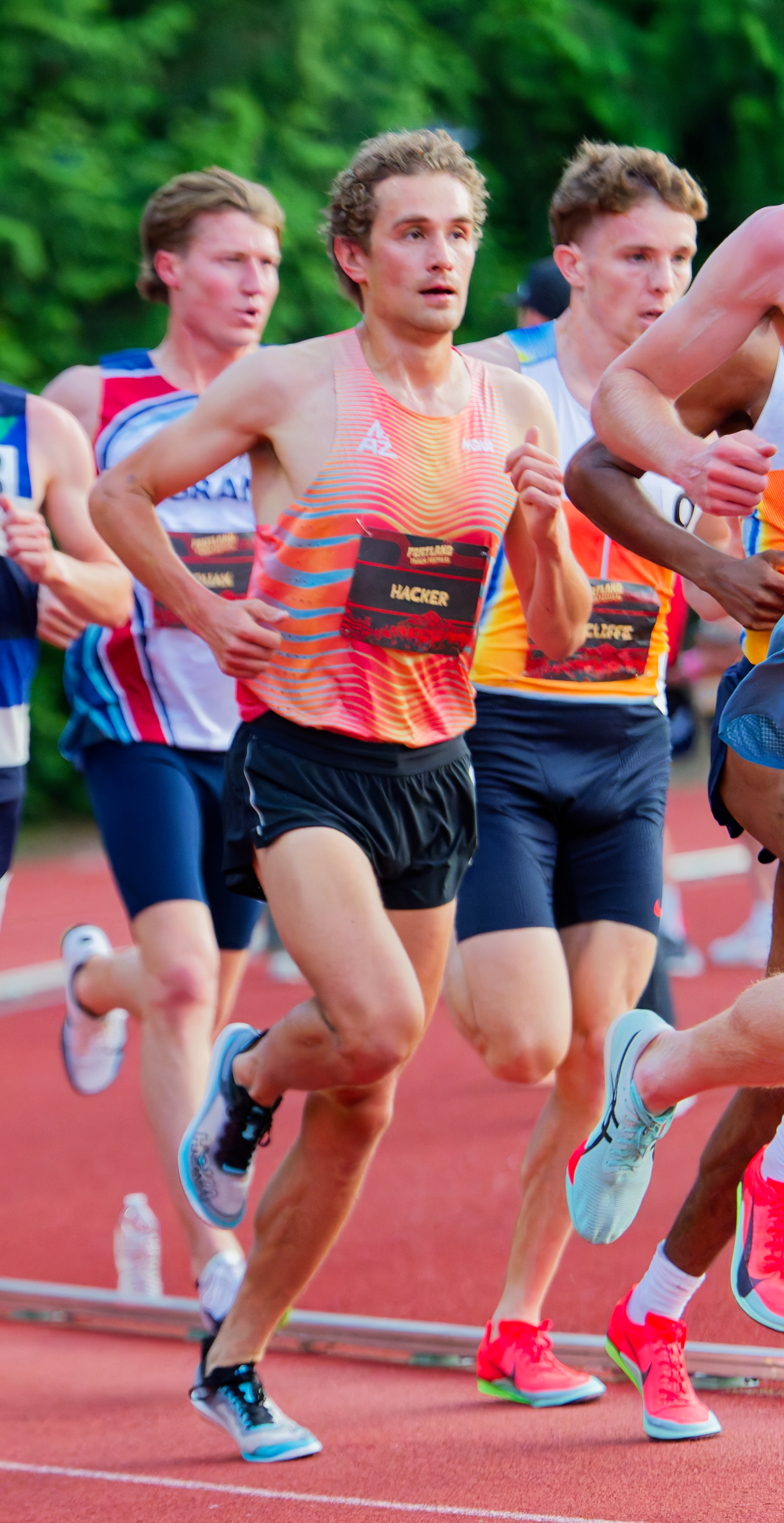
- Hacker in 2025

Personal information
- Nationality: American
- Born: 21 May 1997 (age 29)

Sport
- Sport: Athletics
- Event: Long distance running

Achievements and titles
- Personal best(s): Mile: 3:56.59 (Saint Louis, 2023); 3000m: 7:38.10 (Luzern, 2023); 5000m: 13:02.58 (Oordegem, 2025); 5km (road): 13:27 (Boston, 2023)

Olin Hacker (born 21 May 1996) is an American track and field athlete who competes as a long distance runner. He was runner-up at the US national indoors championships in 2024 over 3000 metres.

== Early life and family ==
Hacker's father, Tim Hacker, was from a family of long distance runners. He was a collegiate champion cross country runner, as well as the United States cross country champion in 1997 and the nation’s 5,000-meter champion in 1989.

Hacker has two older brothers, Sam and Wilson and a sister, Vivian, all of whom have competed in athletics.

Hacker attended Madison West High School in Madison, Wisconsin and won state cross country titles in 2013 and 2014, as well becoming state champion in the mile and two-mile distances.

== Career ==
Hacker won the NCAA title outdoors over 5000 metres in Eugene, Oregon in 2022 in a time of 13:27.73, competing for the University of Wisconsin.

In 2023, he finished third at the US national indoors championships in Albuquerque, in 8:14.33. He finished seventh at the US national outdoor championships over 5000 metres in 2023, and was later selected for the World Athletics Road Running Championships in Riga. He finished in fourteenth place over 5 km in a time of 13:36.

He finished as runner-up in the 3000 metres at the US National Indoors Championships in New Mexico in February 2024, in a time of 7:56.22. He was subsequently selected for the 2024 World Athletics Indoor Championships in Glasgow. In the 3000 metres race he finished in fifth place in a season’s best time of 7:45.40.

== Championship results ==
All results taken from World Athletics profile

| Year | Meet | Venue | Event | Place | Time |
|---|---|---|---|---|---|
| 2016 | US U20 Championships | Clovis, CA | 5000m | 3rd | 15:29.05 |
| 2016 | World U20 Championships | Zdzisław Krzyszkowiak Stadium | 5000m | 19th | 14:23.33 |
| 2021 | NCAA Championships | Hayward Field | 5000m | 19th | 13:44.53 |
| 2022 | NCAA Indoor Championships | Birmingham CrossPlex | 3000m | 4th | 8:00.39 |
| 2022 | NCAA Championships | Hayward Field | 5000m | 1st | 13:27.73 |
| 2023 | US Indoor Championships | Albuquerque Convention Center | 3000m | 3rd | 8:14.33 |
| 2023 | US Championships | Hayward Field | 5000m | 7th | 13:28.16 |
| 2023 | World Athletics Road Running Championships | Riga, Latvia | 5 km | 14th | 13:36 |
| 2024 | US Indoor Championships | Albuquerque Convention Center | 3000m | 2nd | 7:56.22 |
| 2024 | World Indoor Championships | Commonwealth Arena | 3000m | 5th | 7:45.40 |
| 2024 | US Olympic trials | Hayward Field | 5000m | 10th | 13:32.10 |
