= Eric Edwards Jr. =

American hurdler (born 2000)

Personal information
- Nationality: USA
- Born: January 3, 2000 (age 26)
- Home town: Houston, Texas
- Education: Langham Creek High School; University of Oregon; Louisiana State University
- Height: 5 ft 9 in (175 cm)
- Weight: 68 kg (150 lb)

Sport
- Sport: Athletics
- Events: 110 metres hurdles 60 metres hurdles
- College team: Oregon Ducks; LSU Tigers

Achievements and titles
- National finals: 2017 USA U20s; • 110m hurdles, 1st (gold); 2019 NCAAs; • 110m hurdles, DQ; 2019 USA U20s; • 110m hurdles, 2nd (silver); 2021 NCAA Indoors; • 60m hurdles, 5th; 2022 NCAA Indoors; • 60m hurdles, 8th; 2022 NCAAs; • 110m hurdles, 2nd (silver); 2022 USA Champs; • 110m hurdles, 7th; 2023 USA Champs; • 110m hurdles, 4th
- Personal bests: 110mH: 13.15 (+0.0) (2022) 60mH: 7.53 (2026)
Medal record
Men's athletics
Representing United States
Pan American U20 Championships
| Gold medal – first place | 2017 Trujillo | 110 m hurdles |
| Gold medal – first place | 2019 San José | 110 m hurdles |
- Updated on January 15, 2024

Eric Edwards Jr. (born January 3, 2000) is an American hurdler specializing in the 110 metres hurdles. He was the only athlete in Pan American U20 Championships history to win twice in the 110 m hurdles, at the 2017 and 2019 editions. At the 2022 NCAA Division I Outdoor Track and Field Championships, Edwards finished 2nd in a time of 13.15 seconds, the fifth-fastest time in American collegiate history.

== Biography ==
Edwards is from Houston, Texas, where he attended Langham Creek High School. As a prep, he won the 2017 Texas UIL 6A state championships in the 110 m hurdles. Later that season at the 2017 Pan American U20 Athletics Championships, Edwards won his first international gold medal in the same event.

In October 2017, Edwards committed to the Oregon Ducks track and field program, which he represented for one year. At Oregon, he qualified for the 2019 NCAA Division I Outdoor Track and Field Championships finals but was disqualified for running around one of the hurdles.

In July 2019, he transferred to the LSU Tigers track and field program for the remainder of his collegiate career. As he was still under 20 years old, he went on to compete at his second Pan American U20 Championships in San José, Costa Rica later that year, where he won the gold medal again despite healing from a sprained ankle. In doing so, he became the first athlete in meeting history to win twice in the 110 m hurdles.

Edwards qualified for the 2021 United States Olympic trials, but he stopped prior to reaching the second hurdle and did not advance to the finals. At LSU, Edwards competed at a further three NCAA championships, with a best finish of 2nd at the 2022 NCAA Division I Outdoor Track and Field Championships in a personal best of 13.15 seconds. The performance was described as "the race of his life" as it made him the fifth fastest performer in American collegiate history, and the fourth fastest in the world that year. Edwards went on to make the finals of the 2022 and 2023 USA Outdoor Track and Field Championships. He came closest to making the U.S. team with his fourth-place finish in 2023, just outside the top three needed to qualify for the 2023 World Athletics Championships.

Edwards set a new personal best for the 60 metres hurdles of 7.53 seconds at the Czech Golden Gala in Ostrava on 3 February 2026.

== Statistics ==
=== Circuit performances ===
Grand Slam Track results
| Slam | Race group | Event | Pl. | Time | Prize money |
|---|---|---|---|---|---|
| 2025 Kingston Slam | Short hurdles | 110 m hurdles | 7th | 13.42 | US$15,000 |
| 2025 Kingston Slam | Short hurdles | 100 m | 4th | 10.68 | US$15,000 |
| 2025 Philadelphia Slam | Short hurdles | 110 m hurdles | 7th | 13.66 | US$20,000 |
| 2025 Philadelphia Slam | Short hurdles | 100 m | 5th | 10.90 | US$20,000 |

=== Best performances ===
| Event | Mark | Place | Competition | Venue | Date | Ref |
|---|---|---|---|---|---|---|
| 110 metres hurdles | 13.15 (±0.0 m/s) | 2nd place, silver medalist(s) | NCAA Division I Men's Outdoor Track and Field Championships | Eugene, Oregon | June 10, 2022 | |
| 60 metres hurdles | 7.58 | 5th | NCAA Division I Men's Indoor Track and Field Championships | Fayetteville, Arkansas | March 13, 2021 | |
