= Coconino Community College =

College in Arizona, US

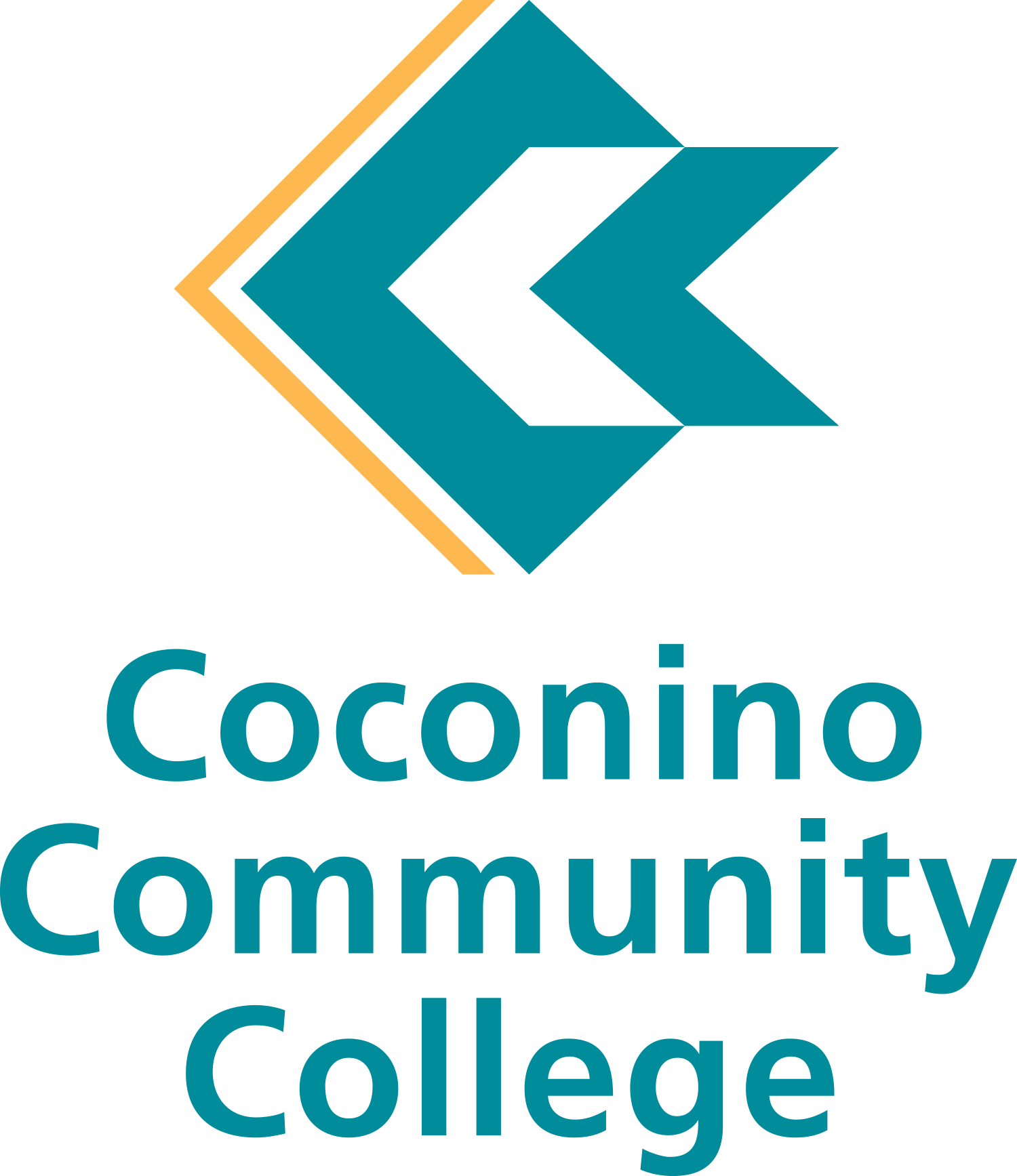
- Former names: Coconino County Community College
- Type: Public community college
- Established: 1991; 35 years ago
- Academic affiliations: Space-grant
- President: Colleen A. Smith
- Students: 3,515
- Location: Flagstaff, Arizona, United States; 35.171118°N 111.644251°W
- Campus: Flagstaff – Lone Tree (Main), Flagstaff – Fourth Street, Fredonia, Grand Canyon, Tuba City, Page and Williams
- Colors: Teal & gold
- Nickname: Comets
- Sporting affiliations: NJCAA – ACCAC
- Website: www.coconino.edu

Coconino Community College (CCC) is a public community college in Coconino County, Arizona. It enrolls more than 7,500 learners annually.

The college offers more than 50 associate degrees and certificates. Scholarships are available through the CCC Foundation. The main campus is in Flagstaff, Arizona, with other college locations in Fredonia, Page, Tuba City, and Williams. CCC works with Northern Arizona University and the major employers in the area in meeting training, workforce and university transfer needs.

== History ==
According to a Jan. 17, 1990 editorial in the Arizona Daily Sun newspaper, "We are the largest county in the state and have large numbers of people who either cannot afford to or are not allowed to enroll at Northern Arizona University. We have large numbers of adults who would avail themselves of an adult education program in the evenings. We have many people who are denied the opportunity for vocational training because they cannot afford to relocated to Phoenix, Prescott or Tucson to enroll in programs."

Previous attempts to create a community college in Coconino County—1978 and 1985—failed. By 1990, another effort was underway, and during a November 1990 election, a ballot measure to form a community college district passed, according to the Arizona Daily Sun. Subsequently, in May 1991, voters approved funding the community college. Nearly 1,000 county residents registered for classes.

Coconino Community College opened as Coconino County Community College on July 1, 1991, in a shopping center at the top of Fourth Street. The first day of classes were in late August 1991. On January 4, 2002, the Lone Tree campus in Flagstaff, AZ opened.

In 1995, CCCC dropped "County" from its name, and is now known as Coconino Community College (CCC).

== CCC2NAU ==
Northern Arizona University partners with CCC to allow students to transfer up to 90 credits to a degree. The CCC2NAU program began at CCC in 2008 with a cohort of 15 students, and to date, more than 4,000 students have transitioned to NAU as of the fall semester of 2019.

== Enrollment 2020 ==
As of fall 2020, the total undergraduate enrollment was 3,289.

Gender
Male	45%
Female	55%

Student age
Under 18	21%
18–21	45%
22–29	21%
30 or older	13%

Student race/ethnicity
Native American	20%
Hispanic	21%
White	47%
Other	12%

== Instructional staff ==
As of fall 2015, Coconino Community College has 169 faculty members; 30 full-time and 146 part-time.

As of July 2017, Coconino Community College has 139 faculty members; 33 full-time and 109 part-time.

As of fall 2020, Coconino Community College has 141 faculty members; 41 full-time and 100 part-time.
