= Abdihamid Nur =

Somali–American long-distance runner

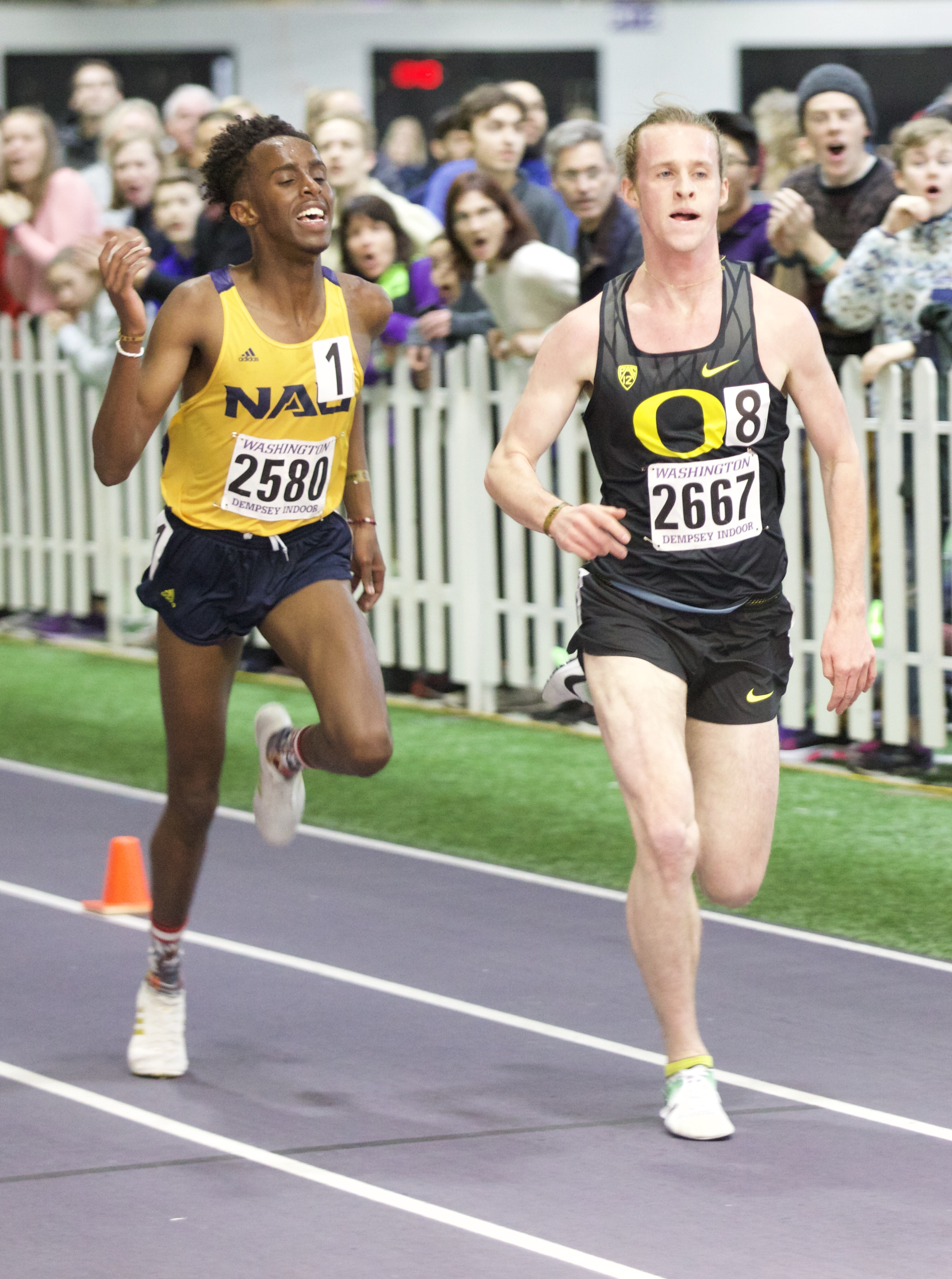
- Nur (left) competes for the Northern Arizona Lumberjacks in 2020.

Personal information
- Born: October 14, 1997 (age 29) Mogadishu, Somalia
- Home town: Phoenix, Arizona
- Education: Northern Arizona University '22; North High School '17
- Employer: Nike

Sport
- Sport: Athletics
- Events: 5000 m, 10,000 m
- University team: Northern Arizona Lumberjacks
- Turned pro: 2022
- Coached by: Michael Smith

Achievements and titles
- Personal bests: Outdoor; 1500 metres: 3:36.33 (Azusa 2022); Mile: 3:55.94 (Seattle 2022); 3000 metres: 7:40.66 (Seattle 2022); 5000 metres: 13:05.17 (Los Angeles 2023); 10,000 metres: 27:17.28 (San Juan Capistrano); Indoor; Mile: 4:03.98 (Bozeman 2022); 3000 metres: 7:58.65 (Albuquerque 2022); 5000 metres: 13:03.17 (Boston 2024)
Medal record
Men's athletics
Representing the United States
Representing Northern Arizona Lumberjacks/ Big Sky Conference
NCAA Cross Country Championships
Gold medal – first place	2020 Stillwater	Team Gold
Gold medal – first place	2021 Tallahassee	Team Gold
Silver medal – second place	2019 Terre Haute	Team Silver
NCAA Indoor Track and Field Championships
Gold medal – first place	2022 Birmingham	5000 meters
Gold medal – first place	2022 Birmingham	3000 meters
NCAA Outdoor Track and Field Championships
Bronze medal – third place	2022 Eugene	10,000 meters
Bronze medal – third place	2021 Eugene	10,000 meters

Abdihamid "Abdi" Nur (born October 14, 1997) is a Somali-born American long-distance runner. He competed collegiately for Northern Arizona University from 2019 to 2022, where he won multiple national titles in the NCAA and set a collegiate record in the outdoor 5000 m. After graduating, Nur signed with Nike and has since won 2 national titles and represented the US at the 2022 and 2023 World Championships, and the 2024 Olympic Games.

== Early life ==
Nur was born on October 14, 1998, in Mogadishu, Somalia. He is the second youngest of eight children. He has three older brothers, three older sisters, and a younger sister. His family moved away from Somalia when he was very young due to the country's political instability. He remembers little of his time there since he was still an infant. His mother wanted a safer life for them, so she made the decision for them to leave Somalia.

They stayed in Kenya, where their mother owned a shop, for three short years prior to settling in Cairo, Egypt for five years. Nur was only 4 when they arrived in Egypt. Then, they immigrated to the United States in 2006 where they first lived in New Mexico for a brief period of time. However, they relocated to Apple Valley, Minnesota, where they had extended family members near the area. Their mother was the primary provider for the family. She worked odd jobs as a janitor and babysitter to financially support them. They would relocate once again to Phoenix, Arizona, while Nur was about to enter high school in 2013. Their mother grew tired of the cold climate in Minnesota.

=== 2013–2017: Relocation to Arizona ===
Initially, Nur played soccer as an underclassman at North High School before he ever started running. He shared that "sports brought [him] closer to people and helped [him] make friends". He even credited sports with helping him transition smoothly to life in the United States, as they allowed him to acclimate to a new culture. However, it was a nearly fatal car accident during his second year that ultimately led Nur to pursue running. A driver in another vehicle struck the car in which Nur was riding as a backseat passenger. As a result, he tore ligaments in his knee and required surgery to repair a fractured collarbone. He was temporarily bedridden, missed the entire soccer season, and was unable to attend school for three months. He later recalled that the experience deeply affected him, describing it as a “really bad time” in his life.

Eager to return to soccer in his junior year, he went through rehab just so that he could quickly get back to the field in good shape. During his rehabilitation, he needed to improve his endurance and conditioning. His coach advised him to give cross country a try. Immediately, Nur showed great potential by coming in third place at his first meet in Flagstaff, Arizona. His coach saw this and recommended that Nur forget soccer and seriously consider switching to running. Nur thought the idea sounded crazy because "soccer was something [he] grew up loving" and an integral part of his identity. His whole family played soccer, including all of his brothers, which is why he struggled to envision quitting the sport.

Soon though, Nur actually took a liking to running and it became something that he did out of genuine interest. Later, he won the Arizona Interscholastic Association (AIA) Cross Country Division I State Championships in his senior year of high school which opened up many opportunities with colleges for him.

Nur is a 2016 Arizona Interscholastic Association Cross Country Division I State Champion, and 3-time Arizona Interscholastic Association Division I State finalist. Nur set personal best times of 5 km 15:30.0, 3200 m 9:27.02, & 1600 m 4:28.34.

He began to receive calls following his win at the AIA Cross Country Championships, putting him on Northern Arizona University's (NAU) radar. Despite failing to qualify academically for the university's cross country team right away, he had to implement changes to his studies to compete for the university at the collegiate level.

=== 2017–2022: Collegiate career ===
==== Coconino County Community College ====
Nur enrolled at Coconino County Community College in Flagstaff in 2017. He fully devoted himself to his grades and training exclusively so that he could increase his chances of being accepted into NAU. Additionally, he had to adjust to the challenges of training without a coach or team, living on his own in a new city, and college courses. Since he remained in his home state, not far from Phoenix, he knew friends in town who he would train with off-campus. The cross country coach at NAU, Michael Smith, kept in contact with Nur and would check in along the way to see how Nur was progressing in his efforts to run for NAU.

Given Flagstaff’s small population and size, Nur inevitably encountered athletes from the Northern Arizona University (NAU) team during his long runs on trails and road loops. He watched them with astonishment as they passed him with apparent ease. Naturally, this led him to question himself and his abilities. He wondered whether he could become part of NAU to train with the squad or even make the team. It would be challenging enough just to earn a spot on the roster, let alone finish in the top seven. Despite his efforts to meet National Collegiate Athletic Association (NCAA) standards, Nur was deemed a non-qualifier once again in the spring of 2018. Though disappointed by the delay in achieving his goals, he came to appreciate that the two years away from competition had taught him resilience, focus, and the determination to pursue his dreams more relentlessly than ever before.

==== Northern Arizona University ====
It was not until the summer of 2019 that he finally raised up his grades and qualified for NAU. He reached out to Coach Mike Smith who started Nur out slowly because Smith was uncertain of what Nur could handle after a two-year break. By this point, Nur was more than ready and gravitated toward the top runners like his teammate Luis Grijalva who acted as his training partner and mentor. They pushed and motivated each other to do their best, becoming close friends as well in the process. Nur would run 80 to 90 miles a week and Grijalva would run 90 to 100 miles a week. Nur surprised himself during one particular workout where he found himself next to Grijalva's shoulder at the end of the session. He boosted confidence in himself and believed that he may be able to place in the top seven at competitions after all if he can keep up with Grijalva.

== Competition record ==
=== International Competitions ===
Year	Competition	Venue	Position	Event	Notes
Representing United States
2022	World Championships	Eugene, United States	11th	5000 m	13:18.05
2023	World Championships	Budapest, Hungary	12th	5000 m	13:23.90
2024	Olympic Games	Paris, France	19th (heat)	5000 m	14:15.00

=== National Championships ===
Year	Competition	Venue	Position	Event	Notes
Representing Nike
2021	USA Olympic Trials	Eugene, Oregon	DNF	10000 m	N/A
2022	USA Outdoor Track and Field Championships	Eugene, Oregon	3rd	5000 m	13:08.63
2022	USA Road 5 km Championships	New York City, New York	1st	5 km	13:24
2023	USA Outdoor Track and Field Championships	Eugene, Oregon	1st	5000 m	13:24.37
2024	USA Olympic Trials	Eugene, Oregon	2nd	5000 m	13:09.01

=== NCAA and Big Sky Championships ===
Representing the Northern Arizona Lumberjacks
Year	Competition	Position	Event	Time
2019	NCAA Division I Cross Country Championships	33rd	10,000 m	31:14.0
2020	Big Sky Indoor Track and Field Championships	1st	3000 m	8:17.30
2020	Big Sky Indoor Track and Field Championships	1st	5000 m	14:29.83
2020	NCAA Division I Indoor Track and Field Championships	All-American	5000 m	Cancelled by COVID-19
2020	Big Sky Cross Country Championships	1st	8000 m	23:55.6
2020	NCAA Division I Cross Country Championships	7th	10,000 m	30:05.3
2021	Big Sky Outdoor Track and Field Championships	5th	1500 m	3:48.20
2021	Big Sky Outdoor Track and Field Championships	1st	5000 m	14:09.20
2021	NCAA Division I Outdoor Track and Field Championships	3rd	10,000 m	27:42.73
2021	Big Sky Cross Country Championships	4th	8000 m	23:21.6
2021	NCAA Division I Cross Country Championships	7th	10,000 m	28:52.9
2022	Big Sky Indoor Track and Field Championships	1st	Mile	4:03.98
2022	Big Sky Indoor Track and Field Championships	1st	DMR	9:50.86
2022	NCAA Division I Indoor Track and Field Championships	1st	3000 m	7:59.88
2022	NCAA Division I Indoor Track and Field Championships	1st	5000 m	13:19.01
2022	Big Sky Outdoor Track and Field Championships	1st	1500 m	3:43.55
2022	Big Sky Outdoor Track and Field Championships	4th	5000 m	14:10.90
2022	NCAA Division I Outdoor Track and Field Championships	3rd	10,000 m	28:14.51

== Prep ==
Year	AIA Cross Country Division I State Championship	AIA Outdoor Track and Field Division I State Championship
2016–17	15:49.0; 1st	3200 m 9:27.02; 4th
2016–17	15:49.0; 1st	1600 m 4:32.86; 8th
2015–16	DNQ	DNQ
