= Yusuf Bizimana =

British athlete

Personal information
- Nationality: British
- Born: 6 September 2000 (age 25)

Sport
- Sport: Athletics
- Event(s): 800m, 1500m
- College team: Texas Longhorns
- Club: Victoria Park

Yusuf Bizimana (born 6 September 2000) is a British middle-distance runner who specializes in the 800 metres.

== Biography ==
From South London, Bizimana moved to the University of Texas to study marketing and compete on the American collegiate scene, citing Josh Kerr as an inspiration for the decision. Before moving to Texas, he finished third in the 800 metres at the 2020 British Athletics Championships.

He won the NCAA Division I Indoor Track and Field Championships in the 800 meters in 2023. He then finished second in the NCAA outdoor championships in June 2023.

In January 2024, he broke the US collegiate 1000m indoor record, running 2:18.10 in Louisville, Kentucky. The time also placed him fourth in the all-time British list.

== Personal bests ==
Outdoor

- 800 metres – 1:45.74 (Austin 2023)
- 1500 metres – 3:42.90 (Waco 2021)
- Mile – 3:59.85 (Ames, IA 2022)
- 5000 metres – 14:12.70 (Austin 2021)

Indoor

- 400 metres – 48.11 (Albuquerque 2023)
- 600 metres – 1:15.79 (Albuquerque 2023)
- 800 metres – 1:46.02 (Albuquerque 2023)
- 1000 metres - 2:18.10 (Louisville, 2024)
- 1500 metres – 3:49.36 (Belgrade 2019)
- Mile – 3:57.81 (Fayetteville 2021)
- 3000 metres – 7:44.76 (Boston 2023)
- 5000 metres – 13:03.78 (Boston 2023)
