= Larry Thompson (gridiron football) =

American football player (born 1971)

Profile
- Position: Wide receiver

Personal information
- Born: May 25, 1971 (age 55); Fairfield, California, U.S.
- Listed height: 5 ft 11 in (1.80 m)
- Listed weight: 171 lb (78 kg)

Career information
- College: Solano Community College

Career history
- 1991–1992: Winnipeg Blue Bombers
- 1994–1995: Saskatchewan Roughriders
- 1995: Hamilton Tiger-Cats
- 1996: Seattle Seahawks*
- 1996–1997: BC Lions
- 1998: Winnipeg Blue Bombers
- 1998: Saskatchewan Roughriders
- 1999: New Jersey Red Dogs
- 2000: Los Angeles Avengers
- 2002: BC Lions
- * Offseason or practice squad member only

Awards and highlights
- CFL East All-Star (1992)

Career CFL statistics
- Receptions: 373
- Receiving yards: 5,801
- Receiving touchdowns: 30

Larry Thompson (born May 25, 1971) is an American former professional football player who was a wide receiver for 10 seasons in the Canadian Football League (CFL) and Arena Football League (AFL).

== Early life ==
Thompson was born and grew up in Fairfield, California and attended Fairfield High School. He scored 22 touchdowns as a senior and was inducted into the Fairfield High School's Hall of Fame in 2016.

== College career ==
Thompson played football at Solano Community College. Thompson was named All-Bay Valley Conference in both seasons with the team, recording over 1,000 yards receiving and scoring 15 total touchdowns.

== Professional career ==
Instead of continuing his collegiate career at a four-year college, Thompson was signed by the Winnipeg Blue Bombers of the Canadian Football League (CFL). He his professional football debut at 19 years old and finished his rookie season with 17 catches for 317 yards and four touchdown receptions. He had 61 receptions for 1,192 yards and 10 touchdowns in 1992 and was named a CFL East All-Star. During the offseason, Thompson was shot in the arm and the femur at his house, which had unknowingly rented to drug dealer while he was in Canada. He missed the entire 1993 season recuperating.

Thompson was signed by the Saskatchewan Roughriders in 1994 and caught 58 passes for 907 yards and three touchdowns in his first season with the team. The Roughriders traded him to the Hamilton Tiger-Cats during the 1995 season. Thompson set the Tiger-Cats' record with 275 yards in a game against Winnipeg and finished the season with career highs of 76 receptions and 1,195 receiving yards and scored six touchdowns. Thompson was signed by the Seattle Seahawks in 1996, but was cut during training camp. After his release he was then signed by the BC Lions and spent the next two seasons with the team. Thompson was signed by the Blue Bombers in 1998 but was cut after seven games despite being the team's leading receiver. He was picked up by Saskatchewan for the rest of the season.

In 1999, Thompson was signed by the New Jersey Red Dogs of the Arena Football League. He was signed by the Los Angeles Avengers in 2000. Thompson returned to the CFL in 2002 with the BC Lions.
