= Marcel Jensen =

American football player (born 1990)

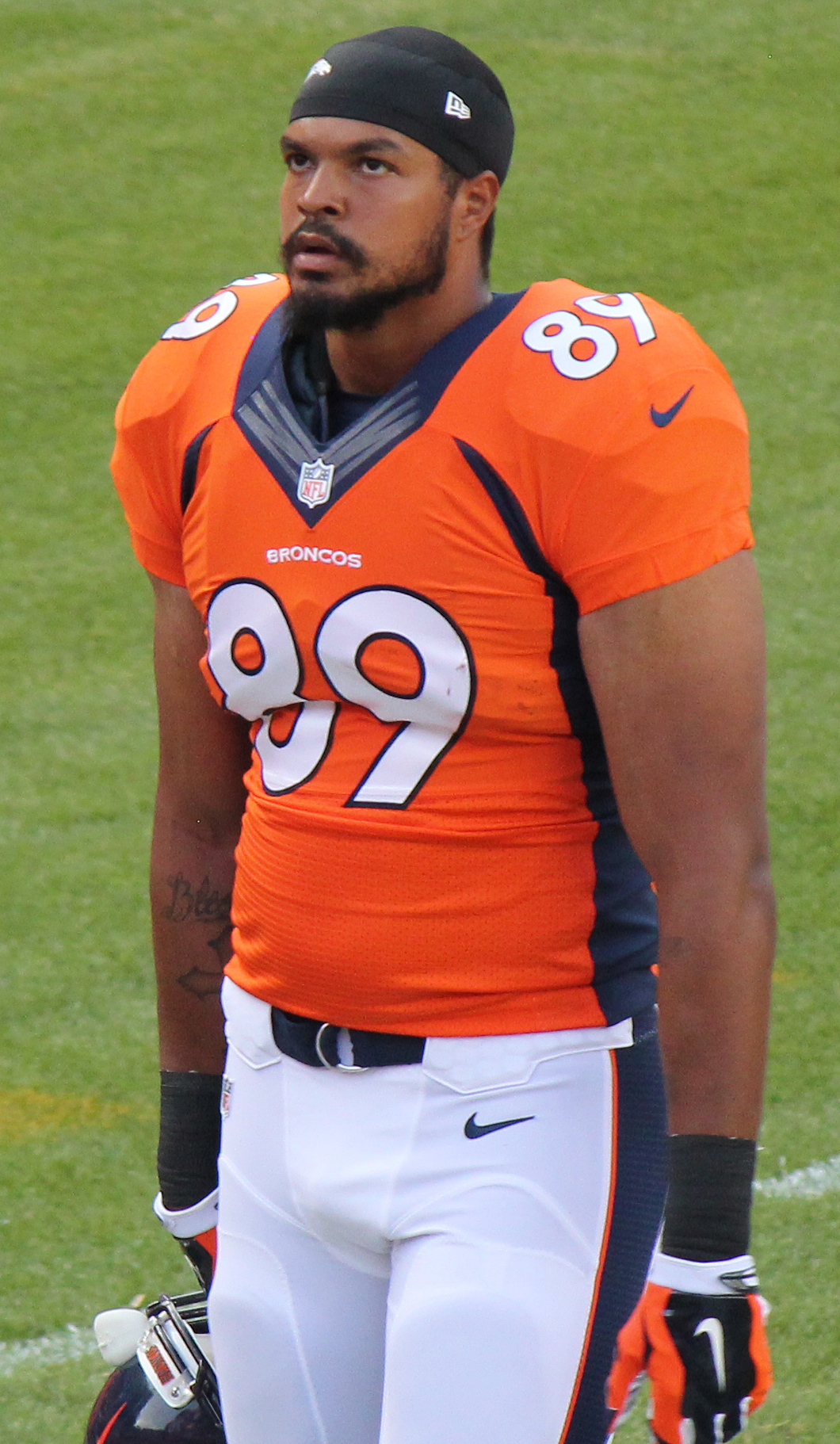
- Jensen with the Denver Broncos in 2015

No. 85, 87, 89
- Position: Tight end

Personal information
- Born: February 12, 1990 (age 36); Fairfield, California, U.S.
- Listed height: 6 ft 6 in (1.98 m)
- Listed weight: 260 lb (118 kg)

Career information
- High school: Angelo Rodriguez (Fairfield)
- College: Fresno State
- NFL draft: 2014: undrafted

Career history
- Jacksonville Jaguars (2014); Denver Broncos (2015)*; Atlanta Falcons (2015)*; Buffalo Bills (2015)*; Washington Redskins (2015); Chicago Bears (2016)*; Philadelphia Eagles (2016)*
- * Offseason or practice squad member only

Awards and highlights
- Second-team All-Mountain West (2013)

Career NFL statistics
- Receptions: 1
- Receiving yards: 8
- Stats at Pro Football Reference

Marcel Esteban Jensen (born February 12, 1990) is an American former professional football player who was a tight end in the National Football League (NFL). He was signed as an undrafted free agent by the Jacksonville Jaguars after the 2014 NFL draft. He played college football for the Fresno State Bulldogs.

== Professional career ==
=== Jacksonville Jaguars ===
Following the 2014 NFL draft, Jensen was signed by the Jacksonville Jaguars as an undrafted free agent. He was waived on August 31, 2014, and added to practice squad the same day. On September 16, the Jaguars promoted Jensen to their 53-man roster. He was released on September 23 and re-signed to the practice squad the next day. He was placed on injured reserve on October 14.

He was released on May 11, 2015.

=== Denver Broncos ===
On May 12, 2015, Jensen was claimed off waivers by the Denver Broncos. On September 5, 2015, he was waived by the Broncos.

=== Atlanta Falcons ===
On September 7, 2015, Jensen was signed to the Falcons' practice squad. On November 24, 2015, he was released from practice squad.

=== Buffalo Bills ===
Jensen signed to the practice squad of the Buffalo Bills on December 9, 2015.

=== Washington Redskins ===
The Washington Redskins signed Jensen off the Bills' practice squad on December 22, 2015. On September 3, 2016, he was waived by the Redskins.

=== Chicago Bears ===
On October 10, 2016, Jensen was signed to the Bears' practice squad. He was released by the Bears on October 25, 2016.

=== Philadelphia Eagles ===
On November 14, 2016, Jensen was signed to the Eagles' practice squad. He was released on December 20, 2016.

== Personal life ==
He is married to his wife, Che'mique. They have a son, Josiah and daughter Ariah.
