= Armijo High School =

Public high school in California, United States

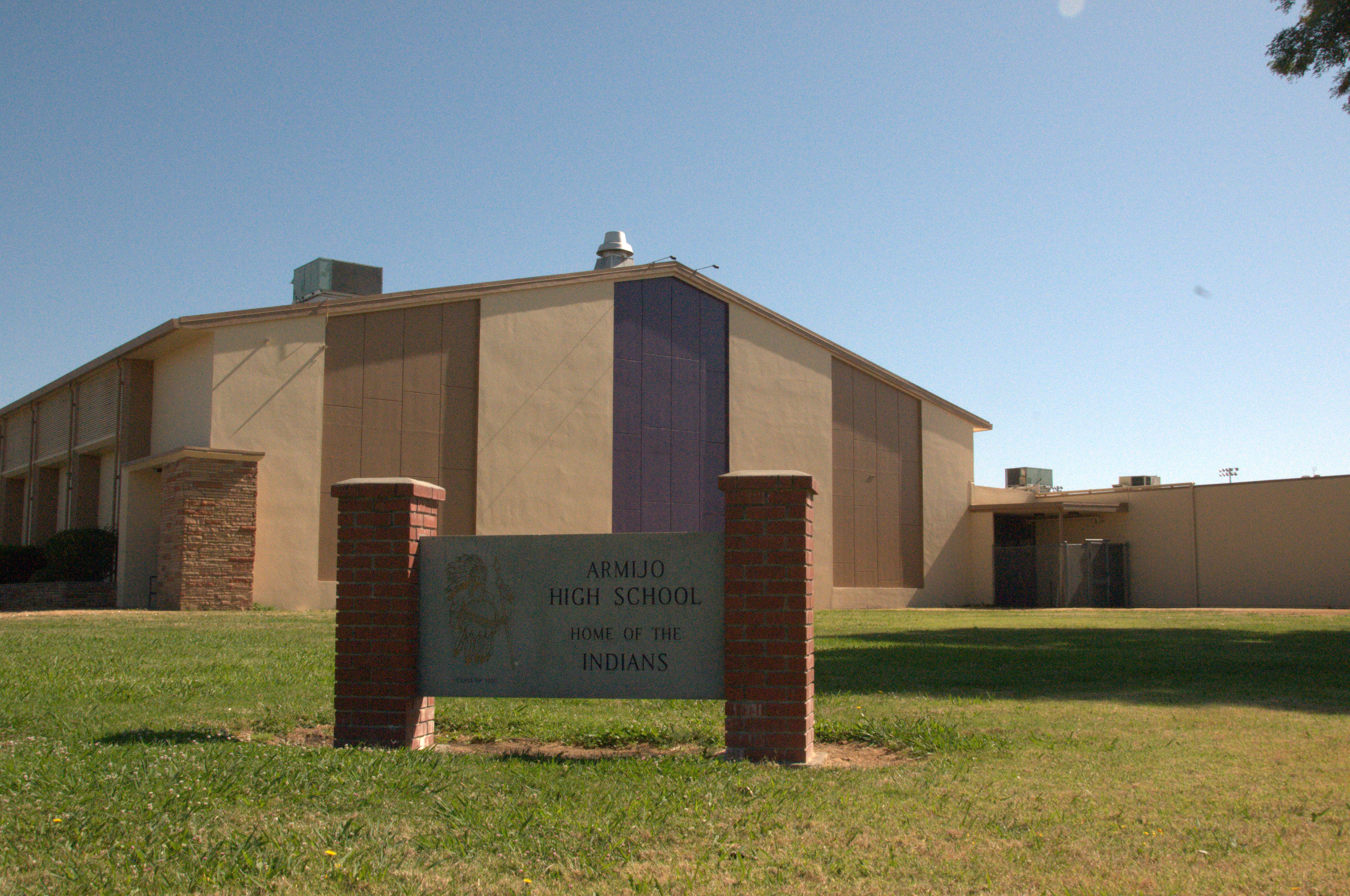

Location
- 824 Washington Street; Fairfield, California 94533; United States; 38.251°N 122.038°W

Information
- Type: Public
- Motto: All students can grow and achieve. It is everyone's responsibility to see that the opportunity is present.
- Established: 1891
- School district: Fairfield-Suisun Unified School District
- Principal: John McMorris
- Teaching staff: 82.50 (FTE)
- Grades: 9 to 12
- Enrollment: 1,899 (2023–2024)
- Student to teacher ratio: 23.02
- Colors: Purple and Gold
- Athletics conference: CIF Sac-Joaquin Section Division I
- Mascot: The Royals, Lion
- Nickname: Royals
- Team name: Armijo Royals
- Accreditation: Western Association of Schools and Colleges; International Baccalaureate
- Publication: The Armijo Signal
- Yearbook: La Mezcla
- Former name: Armijo Union High School
- Website: www.fsusd.org/armijo

Armijo High School is a public secondary school located in Fairfield, California. It is the oldest of the three high schools in the Fairfield-Suisun Unified School District, the other two being Fairfield High School and Angelo Rodriguez High School. It is named after the Armijo family, who purchased one of the original six land grants in Solano County awarded to General Mariano Vallejo. The school serves about 2600 students in grades 9 to 12 from the central part of Fairfield and Suisun City.

The school started in 1891 with 30 students in a single classroom located in the Crystal Elementary School building. In 1893, a separate wooden building was built for use as the high school. In 1915, the school moved to a large stone building on Union Avenue in downtown Fairfield that is now used as the Solano County courthouse. It stayed there for nearly 50 years until construction was completed in 1964 on a newer facility located on Washington Street, roughly two blocks from the Union Avenue location. In 2019, the Fairfield-Suisun School District board voted unanimously to replace the "Armijo Indian" mascot. As of 2020, the school's mascot is "The Royals".

== Notable alumni ==
- Jim Bowie, former Major League Baseball player (Oakland Athletics)
- Robert E. "Rufus" Bowen (1964), Mathematician
- Johnny Colla (1967), Huey Lewis and the News Saxophonist/Guitarist
- Huck Flener (1985), former Major League Baseball player (Toronto Blue Jays)
- Luis Grijalva (2017), professional runner representing Guatemala; Olympian
- Robert F. Hale (1964), Undersecretary of Defense (Comptroller)
- George Martin (1971), National Football League player
- David Moraga, former Major League Baseball player (Montreal Expos, Colorado Rockies)
- Pat Morita (1947), Film actor who portrayed Mr. Miyagi.
- Phaedra Ellis-Lamkins (1983), American sustainability advocate and CEO of the anti-poverty organization Green For All.
- Doug Martin (1976), National Football League Minnesota Vikings
- Howard Van Vranken (1981), American Diplomat and Ambassador
