= Luis Grijalva =

Guatemalan long-distance runner (born 1999)

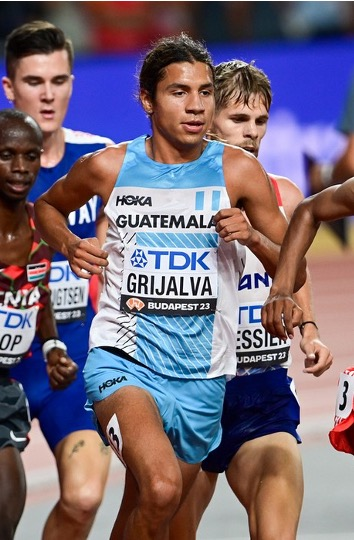
- Grijalva competing at the 2023 World Athletics Championships – Men's 5000 metres.

Personal information
- Full name: Luis Miguel Grijalva
- Born: 10 April 1999 (age 27) Guatemala City, Guatemala
- Home town: Fairfield, California, U.S.

Sport
- Sport: Athletics
- Events: 1500 metres; 3000 metres; 5000 metres
- University team: Northern Arizona Lumberjacks
- Coached by: Mike Smith

Achievements and titles
- Personal bests: Outdoor; 1500 m: 3:35.32 (Mission Viejo 2021); One mile: 4:02.64 NR (San Francisco 2017); 3000 m: 7:29.43 NR (Eugene 2023); 5000 m: 12:50.58 NR (Oslo 2024); 10,000 m: 27:26.02 NR (San Juan Capistrano 2024); Indoor; 1500 m: 3:41.11i NR (Spokane 2022); One mile: 3:53.53i NR (Boston 2023); 3000 m: 7:33.86i NR (New York 2023); 5000 m: 13:29.74i NR (Boston 2020)

Luis Miguel Grijalva (born 10 April 1999) is a Guatemalan long-distance runner. Born in Guatemala, he attended Armijo High School in Fairfield, California, where he was a state champion in cross country and track. He competed for Northern Arizona University from 2017 to 2021, securing multiple All-American finishes in the NCAA. In 2021, Grijalva began competing professionally, sponsored by Hoka One One. At the 2020 Summer Olympics, he finished 12th in the 5000m. He also finished fourth in the 5000m at both the 2022 and 2023 World Athletics Championships.

== Running career ==
=== High school and college ===
Grijalva was a state champion in cross country while attending Armijo High School, winning Division 1 of the 2016 CIF State Cross Country Championships. He was also an All-American at the Foot Locker Cross Country Championships. On the track, Grijalva won the 1600m state championship in 2017, and he recorded high school personal bests of 4:02 in the mile and 8:46 for 2 miles. His senior year, Grijalva signed a letter of intent to compete for Northern Arizona University (NAU), beginning in fall 2017.

While at NAU, Grijalva raced four times in the NCAA Division I Cross Country Championships, improving from a 60th-place finish his freshman year to a 9th-place finish his senior year. His efforts helped lead the school to three national titles. On the track, Grijalva primarily specialized in the 5000m. In his final collegiate race, he finished second in the 2021 NCAA Division I Outdoor Championships, behind Cooper Teare. His time of 13:13.14 was among the top 5 fastest times ever run by a collegian in the event, and it surpassed the Olympic standard of 13:13.50.

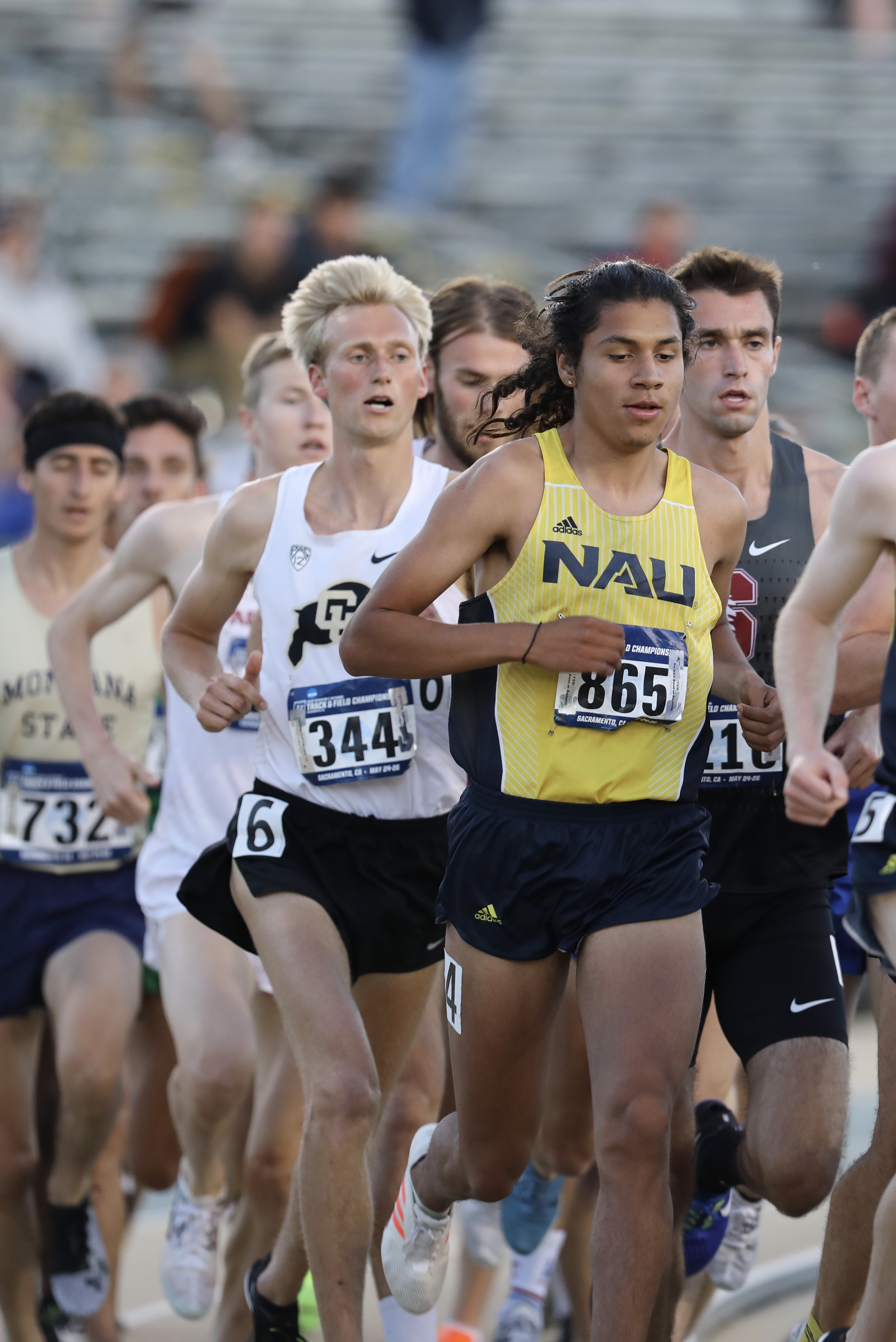
Grijalva competes in the NCAA in 2018

=== Professional ===
==== 2021 ====
In June 2021, Grijalva turned professional after securing a sponsorship deal with shoe company HOKA ONE ONE, and he remained in Flagstaff, Arizona to continue training under his college coach, Mike Smith. He was slated to represent Guatemala in the 5000 m of the 2020 Tokyo Olympics in August. However, his status as a DACA (Deferred Action for Childhood Arrivals) recipient posed challenges for his travel outside the United States, as DACA beneficiaries risk denial of reentry if they leave the country. This situation garnered national attention. Ultimately, Grivalija received special permission from the U.S. Citizenship and Immigration Services to leave and compete. He went on to finish in 12th place in the 5000 m final.

==== 2022 ====
Grijalva competed internationally in June over 3000 m on the Diamond League, running to a time of 7:38.67 and a sixth-place finish in Stockholm, Sweden. He also contested the 5000 m at the Bislett Games in Oslo, Norway, finishing eleventh. In July, Grijalva represented Guatemala at the 2022 World Athletics Championships in Eugene, Oregon. His time of 13:10.44 led him to a fourth-place finish.

==== 2023 ====
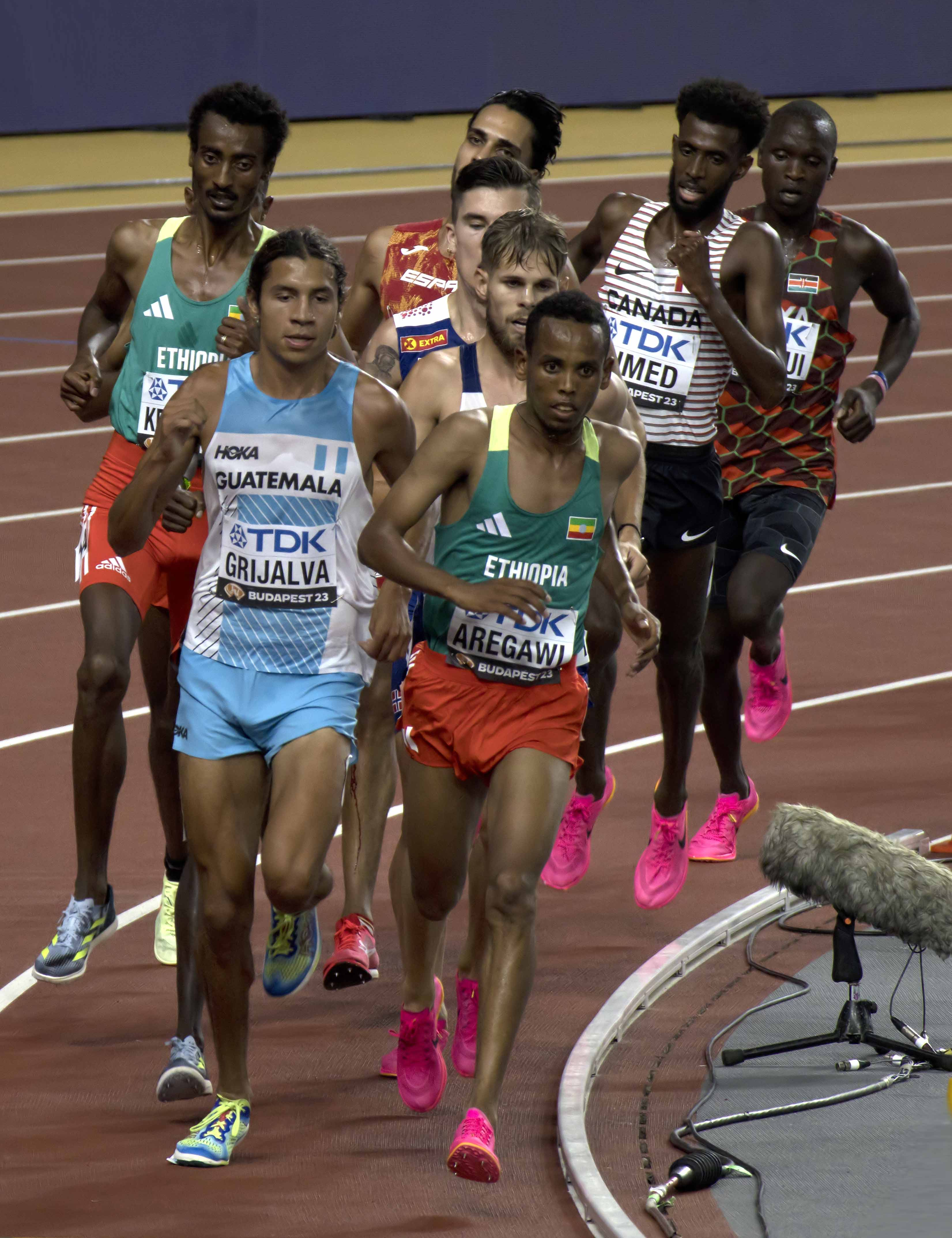
Grijalva competes in the 5000m at the 2023 World Athletics Championship in Budapest, Hungary.

Grijalva competed in several European races during June and July, including at the Golden Gala Pietro Mennea meet in Italy. At that Diamond League event, he ran a new personal best of 12:52.97 for 5000 m, earning him third place. Later that summer, Grijalva represented Guatemala at the 2023 World Championships in Budapest, Hungary. He placed 4th for the second time in the 5000 m of a global championship, just 0.22 second shy of bronze medalist Jacob Krop of Kenya.

On 17 September, he competed in the 3000 m of the Diamond League Final in Eugene, Oregon. His time of 7:29.43, en route to a seventh-place finish, was another national record for the Guatemalan.

=== 2024 ===
In March, Grijalva competed at The TEN in San Juan Capistrano, setting a new Guatemalan national record of 27:26.02. He improved his own Guatemalan national record in the 5000 m at the Oslo Diamond League, running 12:50.58 to finish sixth. On 2 June, Grijalva continued his good form by finishing third over 3000 m at the Stockholm Diamond League in 7:33.96.

At the 2024 Paris Olympics, Grijalva finished sixteenth in his heat, not qualifying him for the final.

In October, it was announced that he had signed up for the inaugural season of the Michael Johnson founded Grand Slam Track.

== Personal life ==
Grijalva's family emigrated to the United States from Guatemala in 2000, when he was a year old. They initially moved to New York, before setting in Fairfield, California. When Grijalva was 13 years old, his two older brothers became involved in gang-related activity and were deported. He credits running with helping him to stay focused on his education.

== Achievements ==
All statistics from athlete's profile on World Athletics.

=== Personal bests ===
Surface	Event	Time	Date	Venue	Notes
Outdoor track	1500m	3:35.32	July 18, 2021	Ogden, Utah	
Outdoor track	One mile	4:02.64	July 29, 2017	Mission Viejo, California	NR
Outdoor track	3000m	7:29.43	September 17, 2023	Hayward Field	NR
Outdoor track	Two Miles	8:21.98	August 21, 2021	Hayward Field	NB
Outdoor track	5000m	12:50.58	May 30, 2024	Bislett Stadium, Oslo	NR
Indoor track	1500m	3:41.11	February 11, 2022	The Podium	NR
Indoor track	One mile	3:53.53	January 27, 2023	Boston University	NR
Indoor track	3000m	7:33.86	February 11, 2023	The Armory	NR
Indoor track	5000m	13:29.74	January 24, 2020	Boston University	NR

=== International competitions ===
Year	Competition	Venue	Position	Event	Time
Representing Guatemala
2021	Olympic Games	National Stadium, Tokyo, Japan	12th	5000 m	13:10.09
2022	World Championships	Hayward Field, Eugene, Oregon, USA	4th	5000 m	13:10.44
2023	World Championships	Nemzeti Atlétikai Központ, Budapest, Hungary	4th	5000 m	13:12.50
2024	Olympic Games	Stade de Paris, Paris, France	16th (heat)	5000 m	13:58.81
2025	World Championships	Tokyo, Japan	40th	5000 m	DNS
