= Quinton Ganther =

American football player and coach (born 1984)

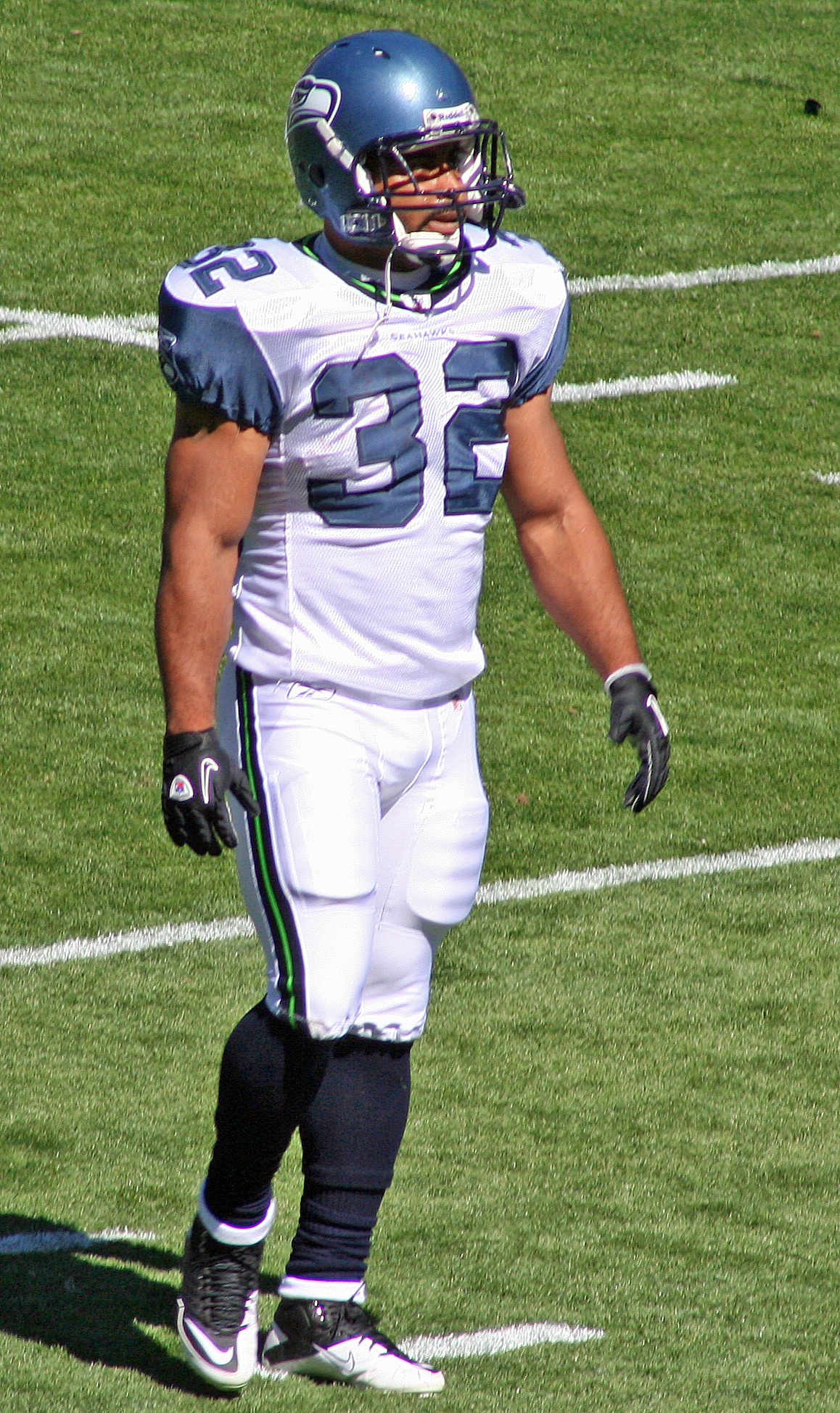
- Ganther in 2010

UNLV Rebels football
- Title: Running backs coach

Personal information
- Born: July 15, 1984 (age 42); Oakland, California, U.S.
- Listed height: 5 ft 9 in (1.75 m)
- Listed weight: 220 lb (100 kg)

Career information
- High school: Fairfield (Fairfield, California)
- College: Utah
- NFL draft: 2006: 7th round, 246th overall pick

Career history

Playing
- Tennessee Titans (2006–2009); Washington Redskins (2009); Seattle Seahawks (2010); Buffalo Bills (2010)

Coaching
- Utah (2012) Student assistant; Seattle Seahawks (2013) Bill Walsh NFL diversity coaching fellowship; Weber State (2014–2020) Running backs coach; Jacksonville Jaguars (2021) Offensive quality control coach; Utah (2022–2024) Running backs coach; UNLV (2025–present) Running backs coach

Awards and highlights
- NJCAA All-American (2003); Second-team All-Mountain West (2005)

Career NFL statistics
- Rushing attempts: 80
- Rushing yards: 280
- Rushing touchdowns: 3
- Receptions: 17
- Receiving yards: 151
- Stats at Pro Football Reference

Quinton Roy Ganther (born July 15, 1984) is an American football coach and former running back. Ganther played college football at The University of Utah Utes and Citrus College and was selected by the Tennessee Titans in the seventh round of the 2006 NFL draft. He played for five seasons in the NFL with the Titans, Washington Redskins, Seattle Seahawks, and Buffalo Bills.

== Early life ==
Ganther played high school football at Fairfield High School.

== Playing career ==
=== College ===
At The University of Utah, Ganther ran 1,120 yards in his senior year with a 5.5-yard-per-carry average. He added 314 yards in the air and had eight total touchdowns.

=== National Football League ===
Pre-draft measurables
Height	Weight	Arm length	Hand span	40-yard dash	10-yard split	20-yard split	Three-cone drill	Vertical jump	Broad jump	Bench press
5 ft 9 1/2 in (1.77 m)	218 lb (99 kg)	28 3/8 in (0.72 m)	8 5/8 in (0.22 m)	4.50 s	1.59 s	2.64 s	7.19 s	35.0 in (0.89 m)	9 ft 11 in (3.02 m)	29 reps
All values from NFL Combine

==== Tennessee Titans ====
Ganther was selected in the seventh round of the 2006 NFL Draft by the Tennessee Titans at pick number 246 overall. He appeared in two games of the Titans in the 2006 NFL season, recording a tackle assist, and spent time on the practice squad.

==== Washington Redskins ====
On October 20, 2009, Ganther signed with the Washington Redskins. Ganther was released on November 6. On November 11, only five days after being released, Ganther re-signed with the Redskins. Ganther had his first NFL career start with the Washington Redskins against the Oakland Raiders on December 13, 2009, scoring two touchdowns, and helping the Redskins to win.

==== Seattle Seahawks ====
Ganther signed with the Seattle Seahawks on March 17, 2010. He was waived on September 28. Ganther was re-signed by the Seahawks on October 26, 2010, but was released again on November 1.

==== Buffalo Bills ====
Ganther signed with the Buffalo Bills on November 8, 2010.

== Coaching career ==
=== Utah (first stint) ===
Following the end of his playing career, Ganther began his coaching career at the University of Utah, his alma mater, as a student assistant coach under head coach Kyle Whittingham in 2012.

=== Seattle Seahawks ===
In 2013, Ganther participated in the Bill Walsh NFL diversity coaching fellowship with the Seattle Seahawks, where he assisted in coaching the running backs.

=== Weber State ===
In December 2013, Ganther joined Weber State University as their running backs coach under head coach Jay Hill.

=== Jacksonville Jaguars ===
On February 4, 2021, Ganther was hired by the Jacksonville Jaguars as the offensive quality control coach under head coach Urban Meyer.

=== Utah (second stint) ===
On January 12, 2022, Ganther returned to his alma mater Utah to be the Running backs coach under head coach Kyle Whittingham.

== Personal life ==
While coaching at Utah, Ganther earned his bachelor's degree in sociology from the University of Utah in 2012.
