= Stevie Johnson =

American football player (born 1986)

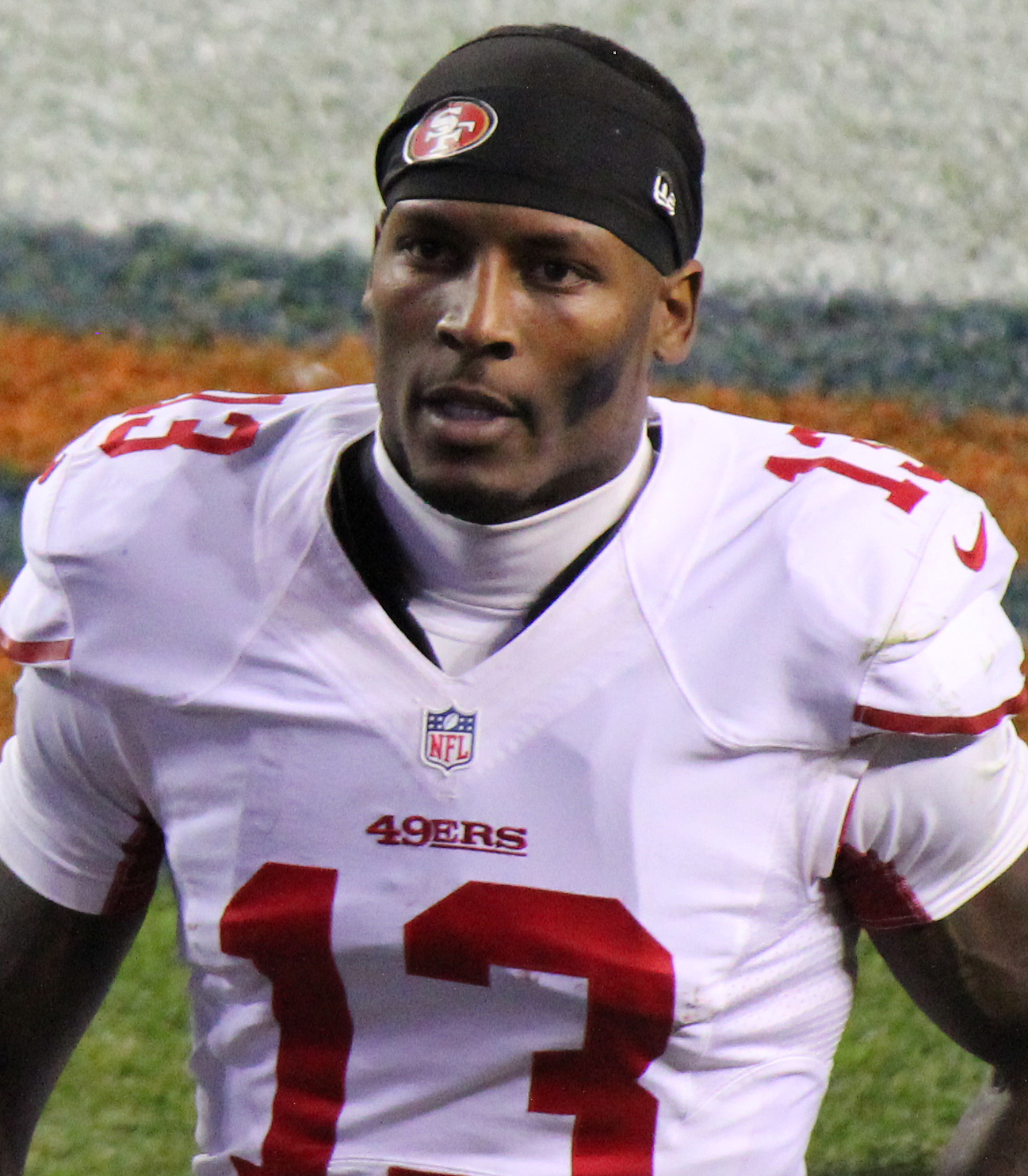
- Johnson with the San Francisco 49ers in 2014

No. 13, 11
- Position: Wide receiver

Personal information
- Born: July 22, 1986 (age 40); San Francisco, California, U.S.
- Listed height: 6 ft 2 in (1.88 m)
- Listed weight: 207 lb (94 kg)

Career information
- High school: Angelo Rodriguez (Fairfield, California)
- College: Chabot (2004–2005); Kentucky (2006–2007)
- NFL draft: 2008: 7th round, 224th overall pick

Career history
- Buffalo Bills (2008–2013); San Francisco 49ers (2014); San Diego Chargers (2015–2016)

Awards and highlights
- First-team All-SEC (2007)

Career NFL statistics
- Receptions: 381
- Receiving yards: 4,764
- Receiving touchdowns: 34
- Stats at Pro Football Reference

Steven John Johnson Jr. (born July 22, 1986) is an American former professional football player who was a wide receiver in the National Football League (NFL). Johnson was selected by the Buffalo Bills in the seventh round of the 2008 NFL draft and also played for the San Francisco 49ers and San Diego Chargers. He played college football at Kentucky. Despite never making the Pro Bowl, Johnson was the first Bills receiver to post back-to-back seasons with over 1,000 yards receiving, and has been considered one of the best draft steals in franchise history.

== Early life ==
Johnson was homeschooled. He was only able to play football two years there as the public school in his area, Angelo Rodriguez High School, did not add a football program until his junior year. After his senior season, he earned All-State and first-team All-Conference honors. He also played two years of basketball and was a second-team All-Conference selection.

== College career ==
Johnson attended Chabot College in California from 2004 to 2005 before transferring to Kentucky. In his first season with the program, he recorded 12 catches for 159 yards (13.3 avg) and 1 touchdown. Against Clemson in the Music City Bowl, Johnson had three receptions for 67 yards.

The 2007 season was a historic one for Johnson as he compiled 61 receptions for 1,052 yards (17.2 avg) and 13 touchdowns. He became the fourth player in school history to gain over 1,000 yards receiving and his thirteen touchdowns in a season rank second on the school's season-record list.

During the season, he caught three game-winning touchdowns, including one against Florida State in the Music City Bowl.

After the season, Johnson was selected to the College Football News' All-Southeastern Conference first-team.

== Professional career ==
Pre-draft measurables
Height	Weight	Arm length	Hand span	40-yard dash	10-yard split	20-yard split	20-yard shuttle	Three-cone drill	Vertical jump	Broad jump
6 ft 1 7/8 in (1.88 m)	210 lb (95 kg)	32 3/4 in (0.83 m)	9 5/8 in (0.24 m)	4.46 s	1.49 s	2.56 s	4.26 s	7.07 s	32.5 in (0.83 m)	10 ft 1 in (3.07 m)
All values from NFL Combine/Pro Day

=== Buffalo Bills ===
==== 2008 season ====
Johnson was selected by the Buffalo Bills in the seventh round (224th overall) of the 2008 NFL draft.

His first reception came in Week 5 against the Arizona Cardinals, and went for 8 yards. In Week 15, against the New York Jets, Johnson caught his first touchdown reception, a two-yard pass from J. P. Losman. He caught his second touchdown a week later against the Denver Broncos on a three-yard pass from Trent Edwards. Johnson finished his rookie season with 10 receptions for 102 yards and 2 touchdowns.

==== 2009 season ====
Battling a severe rib injury, Johnson only managed 2 catches for 10 yards in the 2009 season.

==== 2010 season ====
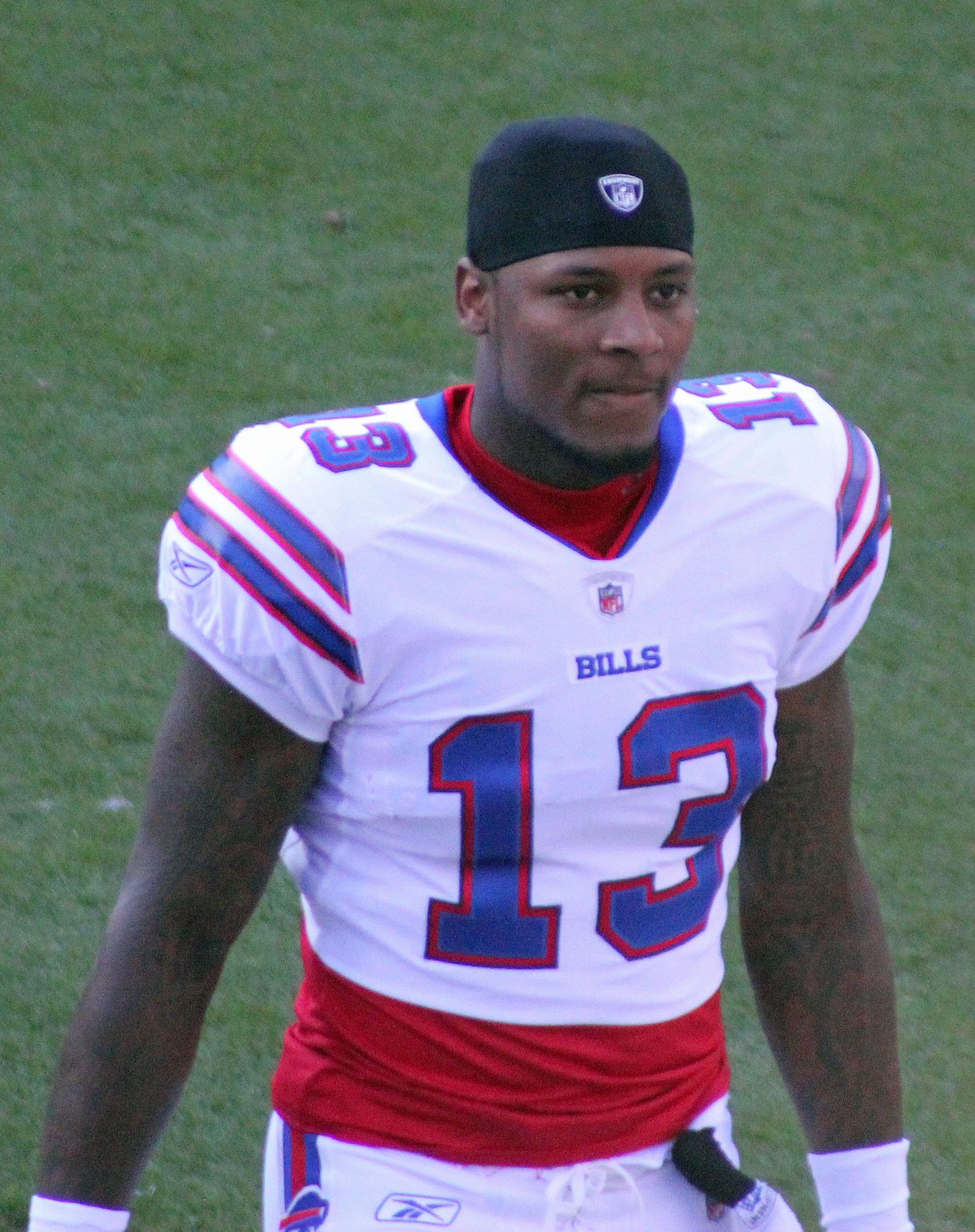
Johnson in the 2011 preseason, while with the Bills.

After good off-season practices Johnson was able to win the starting receiver position before 2010 season. After losing his starting position early in the season, he regained it with a string of good performances, becoming quarterback Ryan Fitzpatrick's favorite target. In a Week 7 loss to the Baltimore Ravens, Johnson had a career-game, catching 8 passes for 158 yards and a touchdown. Two weeks later, he set a career-high in catches with 11 for 145 yards against the Chicago Bears.

During Week 3 of the 2010 season in a game against the New England Patriots at Gillette Stadium, Johnson scored a fourth-quarter touchdown. After the score, he imitated a minuteman firing a rifle and fell to the ground backward pretending to be shot. Johnson was fined $10,000 for the celebration. In a Week 11 win over the Cincinnati Bengals, he caught 8 passes for 137 yards and a career-milestone 3 touchdowns. After his first touchdown, Johnson lifted his jersey to reveal the question "Why so serious?" written on his T-shirt. The quote, made famous by The Joker in the Batman movie sequel The Dark Knight, was directed at Bengals wide receivers Terrell Owens and Chad Ochocinco, who referred to themselves as Batman and Robin. Johnson was fined $5,000 by the league office for the celebration. After dropping what could have been a game winning pass that led to an overtime loss to the Pittsburgh Steelers in November, Johnson lamented on Twitter to God, "I PRAISE YOU 24/7!!!!!! AND IS THIS HOW YOU DO ME!!!!! YOU EXPECT ME TO LEARN FROM THIS??? HOW???!!! ILL NEVER FORGET THIS!! EVER!!! THX THO . . ."

He had a breakout campaign in 2010 with 82 receptions, 1073 yards and 10 touchdowns. Following the season, Johnson was named the 2010 Vizio Top Value Performer for being the NFL player who outplayed his salary by the widest margin.

==== 2011 season ====
In 2011, Johnson posted 76 receptions for 1,004 yards and 7 touchdown receptions. According to Steve, he played the year with a torn groin and a broken hand.

During the 2011 season, Johnson was fined twice for excessive celebrations. The first was Week 12 against the New York Jets. Johnson pretended to shoot his leg and then fly like a Jet and pretended to crash, mocking Jets receiver Plaxico Burress. The second was during Week 17 against the New England Patriots, after scoring a touchdown, he lifted his jersey to reveal "Happy New Year!" written on his under-shirt. He was given a 15-yard unsportsmanlike penalty, and head coach Chan Gailey subsequently benched Johnson for the rest of the game, ending his season.

==== 2012 season ====
On March 5, 2012, Johnson signed a new 5-year contract with the Buffalo Bills worth $36.25 million with a signing bonus of $8.5 million.

In the 2012 season, staying consistent with his statistics, he recorded 79 receptions for 1,046 yards and 6 touchdowns. He became the only receiver in Buffalo Bills history at the time to record three consecutive 1,000 yard receiving seasons.

==== 2013 season ====
After the release of Ryan Fitzpatrick prior to the season, Johnson worked with new Bills quarterback EJ Manuel. He caught the game-winning touchdown from Manuel in the closing seconds of a week 2 matchup against the Carolina Panthers. Johnson failed to record a fourth consecutive 1,000-yard season, finishing with 52 receptions for 597 receiving yards and 3 touchdowns.

=== San Francisco 49ers ===
On May 9, 2014, after the Buffalo Bills acquired Sammy Watkins in the 2014 NFL draft, the Bills traded Johnson to his hometown team San Francisco 49ers for a conditional fourth-round pick in 2015 Draft that could become a third round selection.

In the 2014 season Johnson posted the lowest numbers since his sophomore season, totaling 35 receptions for 435 yards and 3 touchdowns. On March 15, 2015, Johnson was released by the 49ers.

=== San Diego Chargers ===
On March 17, 2015, Johnson signed a three-year, $12 million contract with the San Diego Chargers. Johnson had a fast start to 2015, but was hampered by recurring injuries later through the season. He finished the season with 45 receptions for 497 yards and 3 touchdowns.

On August 10, 2016, it was reported that Johnson would be out for the entirety of the 2016 season after having surgery to repair his meniscus.

On March 7, 2017, Johnson was released by the Chargers.

=== NFL statistics ===
Season	Team	Games	Receiving					Rushing					Fumbles	
Season	Team	GP	Rec	Yds	Avg	Lng	TD	Att	Yds	Avg	Lng	TD	FUM	Lost
Regular Season
2008	BUF	11	10	102	10.2	21	2	1	6	6	6	-	-	-
2009	BUF	5	2	10	5	5	0	-	-	-	-	-	-	-
2010	BUF	16	82	1,074	13.1	45	10	-	-	-	-	-	1	1
2011	BUF	16	76	1,004	13.2	55	7	-	-	-	-	-	-	-
2012	BUF	16	79	1,046	13.2	63	6	-	-	-	-	-	1	0
2013	BUF	12	52	597	11.5	45	3	1	10	10	10	-	1	0
2014	SF	13	35	435	12.4	32	3	-	-	-	-	-	-	-
2015	SD	10	45	497	11.0	34	3	-	-	-	-	-	1	0
Total		99	381	4,764	12.5	63	34	2	16	8	10	0	4	1
Postseason
No playoff appearances

=== Playing style ===
During his prime, Johnson was known for his unorthodox route-running skills and footwork, which he attributes to playing basketball. Johnson used his shiftiness to confuse defensive backs and get open, making up for his average size and speed.

== Personal life ==
Johnson is the cousin of bay-area rapper Ya Boy and Kawhi Leonard, forward for the Los Angeles Clippers of the National Basketball Association (NBA).

In 2014, he showed off his multiple tattoos for PETA's "Ink not Mink" anti-fur campaign.

Since retiring from the NFL, Johnson has taken a head coaching job for his former high school football team. After leaving the NFL, Johnson remains focused on the Buffalo community. He later co-authored a children's book about his NFL career, going on to write two others about his Bills teammates Fred Jackson and Ryan Fitzpatrick, respectively.

In 2023, Johnson helped launch a flag football product called Redzone Football. In 2025, he revealed that he owned the trademark rights to the Buffalo Destroyers arena football team and was partnering with Jackson to revive the Destroyers in the Indoor Football League after a 22-year absence.
