= Desmond Bishop =

American football player and coach (born 1984)

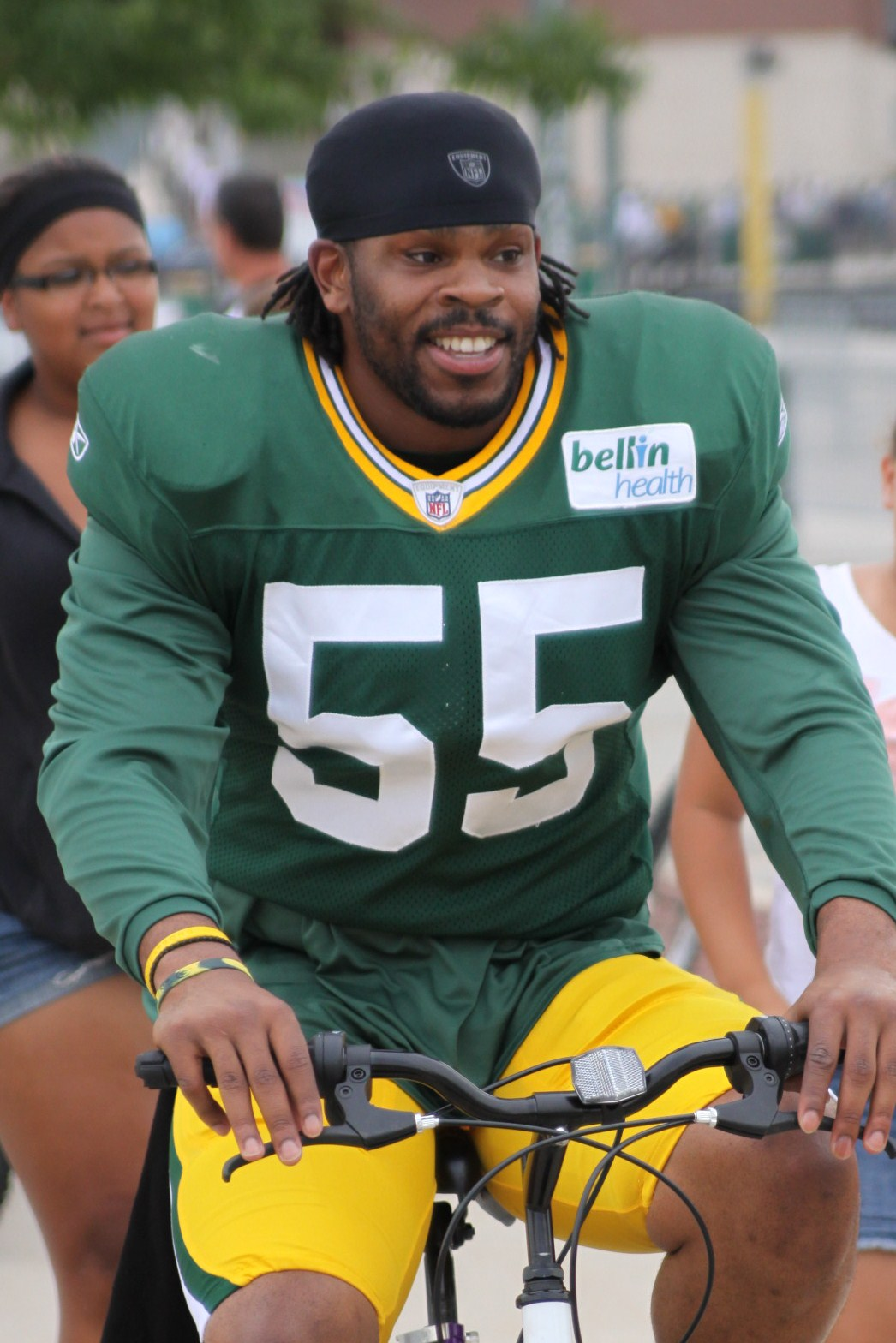
- Bishop with the Green Bay Packers in 2011

No. 55, 59, 44
- Position: Linebacker

Personal information
- Born: July 24, 1984 (age 42); San Francisco, California, U.S.
- Listed height: 6 ft 2 in (1.88 m)
- Listed weight: 241 lb (109 kg)

Career information
- High school: Fairfield (Fairfield, California)
- College: City College of San Francisco (2003–2004); California (2005–2006)
- NFL draft: 2007: 6th round, 192nd overall pick

Career history

Playing
- Green Bay Packers (2007–2012); Minnesota Vikings (2013); Arizona Cardinals (2014); San Francisco 49ers (2014); Washington Redskins (2016)*
- * Offseason or practice squad member only

Coaching
- California (2017) Defensive assistant; Edison HS (CA) (?–2020) Defensive coordinator; Lincoln (CA) (2021) Co-defensive coordinator

Awards and highlights
- Super Bowl champion (XLV); Second-team I-A All-American (2005); Third-team I-A All-American (2006); First-team All-Pac-10 (2006); Second-team All-Pac-10 (2005); First-team JUCO All-American (2004)

Career NFL statistics
- Total tackles: 301
- Sacks: 9.0
- Forced fumbles: 7
- Fumble recoveries: 1
- Interceptions: 1
- Defensive touchdowns: 1
- Stats at Pro Football Reference

Desmond Lamont Bishop (born July 24, 1984) is an American former professional football player who was a linebacker in the National Football League (NFL). He played college football for the California Golden Bears, and was selected by the Green Bay Packers in the sixth round of the 2007 NFL draft and later won Super Bowl XLV with the team over the Pittsburgh Steelers. Bishop also played for the Minnesota Vikings and San Francisco 49ers.

== Early life ==
Bishop attended Fairfield High School in Fairfield, California. While at Fairfield he earned Second-team All-State from Calhisports.com. He played in the California North-South Shrine All-Star Game as a senior in 2002. He also lettered in basketball.

== College career ==
=== City College of San Francisco ===
Bishop attended City College of San Francisco from 2003 to 2004. While there he was a two time letterman. In 2003 Bishop was on the team that won the national championship game that went 13–0. He was ranked by SuperPrep as the fourth-best community college player in the nation and was voted California's 2004 Junior College Defensive Player of the Year by the JC Athletic Bureau/California Community College Football Coaches Association. He was named the Northern California Conference Defensive Most Valuable Player and was a First-team JC Gridwire All-American. He finished the season with 118 tackles 10 regular games. In California's state championship game he had 14 tackles, one sack and two tackles for loss against the College of the Canyons.

=== University of California ===
==== 2005 ====
Bishop immediately won a starting job upon his arrival at the University of California, Berkeley and picked up second-team All-Pac-10 honors. He started all 12 games at middle linebacker and led the Golden Bears with 89 tackles, one forced fumble, and two pass deflections. He made his Cal debut with seven solo tackles against Sacramento State. He ended the season with eight tackles, a pass break-up and a tackle for loss against BYU in the 2005 Las Vegas Bowl.

==== 2006 ====
In 2006, Bishop started all 13 games and was a Third-team All-American choice by Rivals.com, earning honorable mention from The NFL Draft Report, and being placed on the Butkus Award watchlist. He won All-Pac-10 First-team accolades, leading the conference in tackles and leading his team for the second straight year with 126. Bishop became the first Cal player to lead the Pac-10 in tackles since Jerrott Willard posted 147 in 1993. He also had three sacks, a team-high 15 tackles for loss (fourth in Pac-10), two pass break-ups, three interceptions, two forced fumbles and two fumble recoveries. He had at least seven tackles in 11 of 13 games, and was in double digits five times. Bishop ended his career with 12 tackles, with one for loss, in 45–10 win over Texas A&M in 2006 Holiday Bowl.

== Professional career ==
Pre-draft measurables
Height	Weight	40-yard dash	10-yard split	20-yard split	20-yard shuttle	Three-cone drill	Vertical jump	Broad jump	Bench press
6 ft 2 in (1.88 m)	239 lb (108 kg)	4.81 s	1.60 s	2.78 s	4.65 s	7.14 s	32 1/2 in (0.83 m)	9 ft 4 in (2.84 m)	20 reps
All values from California's Pro Day

=== Green Bay Packers ===
The Green Bay Packers selected Bishop in the sixth round (192nd overall) of the 2007 NFL draft.

Bishop played in ten games for the Packers during his rookie season, making 10 tackles. During his second season Bishop made his first career start in a week 14 game against the Houston Texans, recording 12 tackles and a sack. He finished the season with 35 tackles.

After starting middle linebacker Nick Barnett went down with a season-ending wrist injury in Week 4 of the 2010 season, Bishop was quickly named Barnett's replacement and exceeded expectations. He started the remaining 12 games and finished the season with 103 tackles, 3 sacks, 2 forced fumble and 1 interception, which was returned for a touchdown. He was a starter and also recovered a crucial fumble in Super Bowl XLV, after Clay Matthews knocked the ball loose from Rashard Mendenhall, which was a key play in the Packers' 31–25 win over the Pittsburgh Steelers.

On January 4, 2011, the Packers re-signed Bishop to a 4-year, $19 million deal.

On August 9, 2012, in a preseason game against the San Diego Chargers, Bishop sustained a significant injury to his hamstring which required surgical repair.

On August 27, 2012, the Green Bay Packers placed Bishop on injured reserve after the hamstring injury he sustained in the preseason game against the San Diego Chargers. On June 17, 2013, he was released.

=== Minnesota Vikings ===
On June 24, 2013, Bishop agreed to terms on a one-year contract with the Minnesota Vikings. On October 13, Bishop tore his ACL in his right knee and was subsequently placed on season ending injured reserve.

=== Arizona Cardinals ===
On August 14, 2014, Bishop was signed by the Arizona Cardinals. He was released by the Cardinals on September 6, 2014, re-signed with them on October 1, 2014, and was released again on December 1, 2014.

=== San Francisco 49ers ===
Bishop signed with the San Francisco 49ers on December 16, 2014.

The 49ers re-signed him to a one-year contract on March 31, 2015. He was placed on the team's injured reserve on August 31. On September 6, the 49ers released Bishop with an injury settlement.

=== Washington Redskins ===
The Washington Redskins signed Bishop to a futures contract on January 4, 2016. He was released on May 2.

== Career statistics ==
=== NFL ===
Legend
**Bold**	Career high

==== Regular season ====
Year	Team	Games		Tackles					Interceptions					Fumbles			
Year	Team	GP	GS	Cmb	Solo	Ast	Sck	TFL	Int	Yds	TD	Lng	PD	FF	FR	Yds	TD
2007	GNB	10	0	10	8	2	0.0	0	0	0	0	0	0	0	0	0	0
2008	GNB	15	1	35	29	6	1.0	2	0	0	0	0	0	**3**	0	0	0
2009	GNB	**16**	0	31	20	11	0.0	1	0	0	0	0	0	0	**1**	**2**	0
2010	GNB	15	12	103	75	**28**	3.0	3	**1**	**32**	**1**	**32**	**8**	2	0	0	0
2011	GNB	13	**13**	**115**	**90**	25	**5.0**	**10**	0	0	0	0	1	2	0	0	0
2013	MIN	4	1	5	4	1	0.0	1	0	0	0	0	0	0	0	0	0
2014	SFO	2	0	2	2	0	0.0	0	0	0	0	0	0	0	0	0	0
		75	27	301	228	73	9.0	17	1	32	1	32	9	7	1	2	0

==== Playoffs ====
Year	Team	Games		Tackles					Interceptions					Fumbles			
Year	Team	GP	GS	Cmb	Solo	Ast	Sck	TFL	Int	Yds	TD	Lng	PD	FF	FR	Yds	TD
2007	GNB	1	0	1	1	0	0.0	0	0	0	0	0	0	0	0	0	0
2009	GNB	1	0	4	2	2	0.0	0	0	0	0	0	0	0	0	0	0
2010	GNB	**4**	**4**	**27**	**22**	**5**	**1.0**	**5**	0	0	0	0	0	**1**	**2**	**7**	0
2011	GNB	1	1	5	4	1	0.0	2	0	0	0	0	**1**	0	0	0	0
		7	5	37	29	8	1.0	7	0	0	0	0	1	1	2	7	0

=== College ===
Defensive statistics
Year	Team	GP	GS	Tack	Solo	Ast	TFL	Sack	FF	FR	Int	Yds	Lng	TD	Pass Def.
2005	California Golden Bears	12	12	89	62	27	6	0	1	0	0	0	0	0	2
2006	California Golden Bears	13	13	126	63	63	15	3	2	2	3	79	79	0	2
Total		25	25	215	125	90	21	3	3	2	3	79	79	0	4

== Coaching career ==
In 2017, Bishop was hired by first-year coach Justin Wilcox to return to the California Golden Bears as an assistant coach for defensive quality control.

== Personal life ==
Bishop's father Dennis played college football for the Illinois Fighting Illini. and professionally in the USFL. His younger brother Devin followed in his footsteps, also playing at San Francisco City College and transferring to Cal, where he was also linebacker on the football team, wearing his brother's former jersey number, 10.

In high school, Bishop played against future Packers teammate Jarrett Bush, as the two were from rival schools.

During the Packers' visit to the White House, Bishop was denied entrance by White House officials after he left his I.D. on the team plane.
