= The TEN =

Annual athletics meeting in California, US

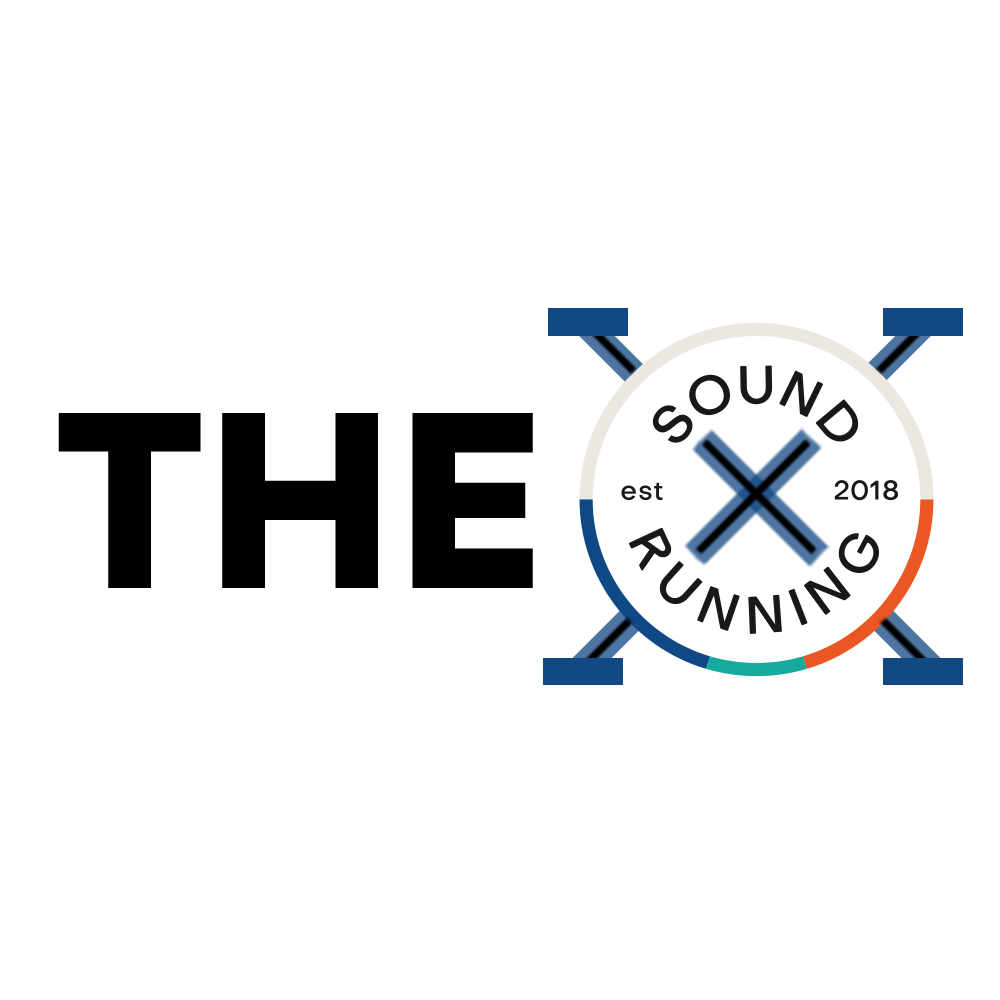
- Dates: March
- Host city: San Juan Capistrano, California, United States
- Venue: JSerra Catholic High School track
- Level: World Athletics Continental Tour Silver
- Official website: www.soundrunning.run/ten

The TEN is a track and field meeting held at the JSerra Catholic High School track in San Juan Capistrano, California, United States. Since 2023 it is a World Athletics Continental Tour Silver level meeting – the third-highest level of international athletics meetings behind the Diamond League and Gold tier.

The TEN was founded in 2021 by Jesse Williams and is sponsored by Sound Running. It was inspired by the Night of the 10,000m PBs. In addition to prize money, athletes are paid by sharing revenue and tips from a pay-per-view broadcast of the event. In its founding year, only a men's and women's 10,000 metres were contested, but in subsequent years other running events were added as required to bring the meeting up to Continental Tour Silver status. The Silver designation awards extra World Athletics Rankings points for placement, helping athletes qualify for athletics at the Summer Olympics and World Athletics Championships competitions.

In 2022, Grant Fisher set the U.S. record for 10,000 m at the event. The following year, both the British and American records were set in the women's 10,000 m by Eilish McColgan and Alicia Monson, respectively.

== Editions ==
Key:

Current meet record

The TEN editions
Ed.	Date	Men's 10,000 m		Women's 10,000 m		Ref.
Ed.	Date	Winner	Time	Winner	Time	Ref.
1st	Feb 20, 2021	Marc Scott (GBR)	27:10.41	Elise Cranny (USA)	30:47.42	
2nd	Mar 6, 2022	Grant Fisher (USA)	26:33.84	Elise Cranny (USA)	30:14.66	
3rd	Mar 4, 2023	Woody Kincaid (USA)	27:06.37	Eilish McColgan (GBR)	30:00.86	
4th	Mar 16, 2024	Grant Fisher (USA)	26:52.04	Tsigie Gebreselama (ETH)	29:48.34	
5th	Mar 29, 2025	Ishmael Kipkurui (KEN)	26:50.21	Elise Cranny (USA)	30:36.56	
6th	Mar 28, 2026	Mohamed Abdilaahi (GER)	26:56.58	Shelby Houlihan (USA)	30:50.10	

== Records set ==
Records set at The TEN
Year	Athlete	Time	Rec.	Place	Ref.
2021	Kieran Tuntivate (THA)	27:17.14	NR	5th	
2022	Grant Fisher (USA)	26:33.84	AR	1st	
2022	Mohammed Ahmed (CAN)	26:34.14	NR	2nd	
2022	Jack Rayner (AUS)	27:15.35	AR	3rd	
2022	Mohamed Hrezi (LBA)	28:30.58	NR	6th (Race B)	
2023	Luis Grijalva (GUA)	27:42.56	NR	9th	
2023	Eilish McColgan (GBR)	30:00.86	NR	1st	
2023	Alicia Monson (USA)	30:03.82	AR	2nd	
2023	Laura Galván (MEX)	31:04.08	NR	6th	
2024	Kieran Tuntivate (THA)	3:37.58 (1500 m)	NR	1st	
2024	Nico Young (USA)	26:52.72	NCAAR	2nd	
2024	Andreas Almgren (SWE)	26:52.87	NR	3rd	
2024	Adriaan Wildschutt (RSA)	26:55.54	NR	6th	
2024	Jack Rayner (AUS)	27:09.57	AR	13th	
2024	Luis Grijalva (GUA)	27:26.02	NR	16th	
2024	Gulveer Singh (IND)	27:41.81	NR	2nd (Race B)	
2024	Lauren Ryan (AUS)	30:35.66	NR	3rd	
2024	Megan Keith (GBR)	30:36.84	NU23R	4th	
2024	Florencia Borelli (ARG)	31:33.07	AR	15th	
2025	Gulveer Singh (IND)	27:00.22	NR	6th	
2025	Efrem Gidey (IRL)	27:26.95	NR	12th	
2025	Valentín Soca (URU)	27:37.65	NR	17th	
2026	Mohamed Abdilaahi (GER)	26:56.58	NR	1st	
2026	Ky Robinson (AUS)	26:57.07	AR	2nd	
2026	Mike Foppen (NED)	27:20.52	NR	3rd	
2026	Mohamed Guled (SOM)	28:04.46	NR	13th	
2026	Viviana Aroche (GUA)	32:35.19	NR	3rd (Race B)	
