= Fairfield High School (California) =

Public secondary school in Fairfield, California, United States

Location
- 205 E Atlantic Ave; Fairfield, California, 94533; United States; 38.2758575°N 122.0313673°W

Information
- Type: Public
- Established: 1964
- School district: Fairfield-Suisun Unified School District
- Principal: Rebecca Dinwiddie
- Teaching staff: 68.53 (FTE)
- Grades: 9 to 12
- Enrollment: 1,560 (2023–2024)
- Student to teacher ratio: 22.76
- Colors: Red, black and white
- Athletics conference: CIF Sac-Joaquin Section Division II; Solano County Athletic Conference (SCAC)
- Mascot: Falco the Falcon
- Nickname: FHS, Fairfield High, The High
- Team name: Fairfield Falcons
- Accreditation: Western Association of Schools and Colleges
- Yearbook: Talon

Fairfield High School is a public secondary school located in Fairfield, California, United States. It is one of the three high schools in the Fairfield-Suisun Unified School District, the other two being Armijo High School and Angelo Rodriguez High School. The school has about 1,610 students in grades 9 to 12 in north-central Fairfield.

== History ==
On May 20, 2026, a 16-year-old student of the school was arrested after a confrontation with other students on campus. The family of the student filed a claim against the city of Fairfield with a local civil rights firm after video showed the arresting Fairfield police officer repeatedly striking the student in the head after being brought to the ground and as he attempted to shield his face with his hands.

The student's attorneys said that the confrontation with the other students was verbal, and did not escalate into a physical confrontation. The attorneys also say that the student suffered a concussion as a result of the incident. The Fairfield Police Department released body cam footage of the incident which showed the student attempting to evade officers' attempts to restrain him, before being restrained by a school resource officer. The Fairfield police officer then appeared to grab the student and throw him to the ground and strike him repeatedly in the head while pulling his hair before handcuffing him. The Fairfield Police Department said that the hits were "distraction strikes". The involved officer was administratively reassigned following the incident.

=== 2026 shooting ===
On June 3, 2026, 18-year-old newly-graduated Jamario Baker was killed in a mass shooting on the campus of the school. Three others, including his 11-year-old sister were injured. The shooting took place in the parking lot of Fairfield High School after the conclusion of a graduation ceremony for Sem Yeto High School. Sam Yeto High School is a continuation school and shares a campus with Fairfield High School. Fairfield mayor Catherine Moy said that her heart was "breaking for the students and families involved" and that "the shooter will face justice".

On July 10, a 17-year-old suspect was taken into custody without incident at a home in the Dallas–Fort Worth area by the US Marshals Service and Fairfield Police Department detectives. The suspect was charged with murder among other offenses and was extradited to Solano County. On July 28, the suspect was charged with one count of murder, three counts of attempted murder, and two counts of other firearms-related charges; he pleaded not guilty on August 12. The Solano County District Attorney's Office intends to try the suspect as an adult.

== Notable alumni ==
- Kevin S. Tenney (1973), producer, director, writer
- John F. Campbell (1975), retired general, commander of US and NATO Forces Afghanistan, vice chief of staff, US Army
- Tracy K. Smith (1990), Pulitzer Prize winning poet
- Desmond Bishop (2002), NFL player, Super Bowl Champion
- Quinton Ganther (2002), NFL player
- Alicia Hollowell (2002), 2008 US olympic softball player
- Keshia Baker (2006), Olympic gold medalist
- Sage the Gemini (2010), rapper best known for hit songs like "Red Nose" and "Gas Pedal"
