= James-Michael Johnson =

American football player (born 1989)

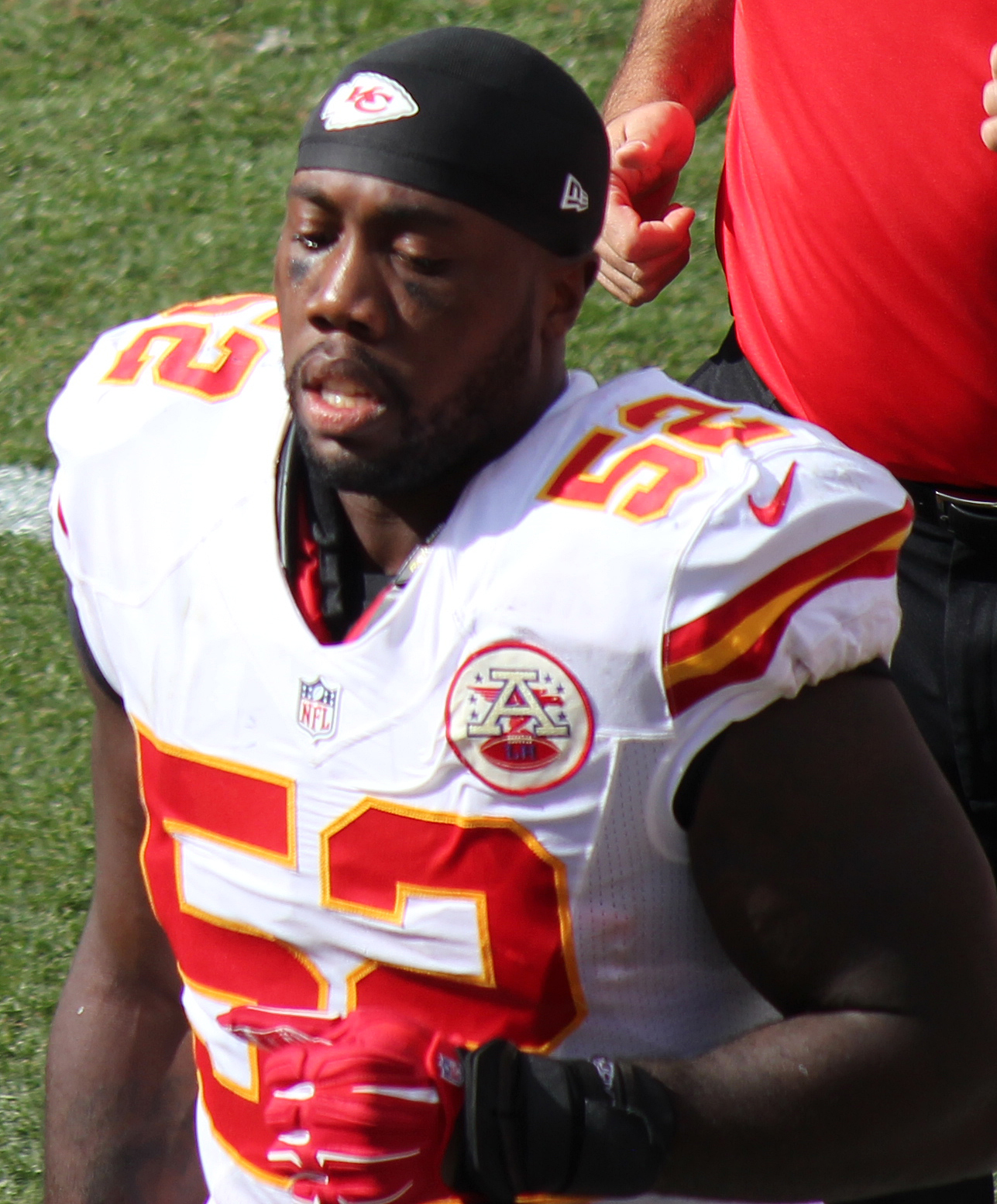
- Johnson with the Kansas City Chiefs in 2014

No. 50, 52, 53, 56
- Position: Linebacker

Personal information
- Born: August 20, 1989 (age 37); Vallejo, California, U.S.
- Listed height: 6 ft 1 in (1.85 m)
- Listed weight: 238 lb (108 kg)

Career information
- High school: Rodriguez (Fairfield, California)
- College: Nevada
- NFL draft: 2012: 4th round, 120th overall pick

Career history
- Cleveland Browns (2012); Kansas City Chiefs (2013–2014); Tampa Bay Buccaneers (2015); Jacksonville Jaguars (2015); Detroit Lions (2015); Miami Dolphins (2015)

Career NFL statistics
- Total tackles: 106
- Sacks: 1
- Forced fumbles: 2
- Stats at Pro Football Reference

James-Michael Johnson (born August 20, 1989) is an American former professional football player who was a linebacker in the National Football League (NFL). He was selected by the Cleveland Browns in the fourth round of the 2012 NFL draft. He played college football for the Nevada Wolf Pack.

== Professional career ==
=== Cleveland Browns ===
Johnson was selected by the Cleveland Browns in the fourth round, 120th overall pick of the 2012 NFL draft. On May 9, 2012, he signed a 4-year contract with the Browns. After being injured in the pre-season, Johnson returned to the Browns lineup in week 5 and made his first career start week 6. Johnson finished with a career high, 10 tackles, week 8 against the Chargers. Johnson's season finished with 36 tackles, and two stuffs in 10 games. On August 31, 2013 Johnson was waived.

=== Kansas City Chiefs ===
On September 1, 2013, Johnson was claimed off waivers by the Kansas City Chiefs. In 2013, he recorded 17 tackles, one sack, and one forced fumble while playing all 16 games.

In Johnson's second season with the Chiefs he had his best season of his career. Johnson had 51 tackles and one forced fumble.

On September 5, 2015, Johnson was released by the Chiefs.

=== Tampa Bay Buccaneers ===
On September 6, 2015, Johnson was claimed off waivers by the Tampa Bay Buccaneers. On September 15, he was waived after suffering an injury.

=== Jacksonville Jaguars ===
On October 5, 2015, the Jacksonville Jaguars signed Johnson to provide depth at linebacker. The Jaguars released Johnson on October 28, 2015.

=== Detroit Lions ===
Johnson was signed by the Detroit Lions on November 4, 2015. On November 14, 2015, the Lions waived Johnson.

=== Miami Dolphins ===
Johnson was signed by the Miami Dolphins on November 17, 2015. On December 1, 2015, he was waived. On December 22, he was re-signed by the Dolphins. On September 3, 2016, he was released as part of final roster cuts.
