= Fairfield-Suisun Unified School District =

School district in California, United States

Address
- 2490 Hilborn Road Fairfield, California, 94534; United States

District information
- Type: Public
- Grades: K–12
- NCES District ID: 0613360

Students and staff
- Students: 20,703 (2020–2021)
- Teachers: 886.66 (FTE)
- Staff: 1,028.35 (FTE)
- Student–teacher ratio: 23.35:1

Other information
- Website: www.fsusd.org

Fairfield-Suisun Unified School District is a public school district in Solano County, California, and a portion of Napa County, California.

== High schools ==
- Angelo Rodriguez High School
- Armijo High School
- Early College High School
- Fairfield High School
- Sem Yeto High School

== Middle Schools ==
- B. Gale Wilson Middle School
- Crystal Middle School
- Grange Middle School
- Green Valley Middle School
- Matt Garcia Career and College Academy

== Elementary Schools ==
- Anna Kyle Elementary School
- Cleo Gordon Elementary School
- Cordelia Hills Elementary School
- Crescent Elementary School
- Dan O'Root II Elementary School
- Dover Elementary School
- Fairview Elementary School
- K.I. Jones Elementary School
- Laurel Creek Elementary School
- Nelda Mundy Elementary School
- Oakbrook Academy of the Arts
- Rolling Hills Elementary School
- Sheldon Academy of Innovative Learning
- Suisun Elementary School
- Tolenas Elementary School

== K-8 Schools ==
- David Weir Preparatory Academy
- Suisun Valley K-8 School
- Sullivan Language Immersion Academy
- Virtual Academy of Fairfield-Suisun

== Other ==
- Fairfield-Suisun Adult School
- H. Glenn Richardson
- Mary Bird Early Childhood Education Center
- Public Safety Academy
