= Fairfield, California =

City in California, United States

- City
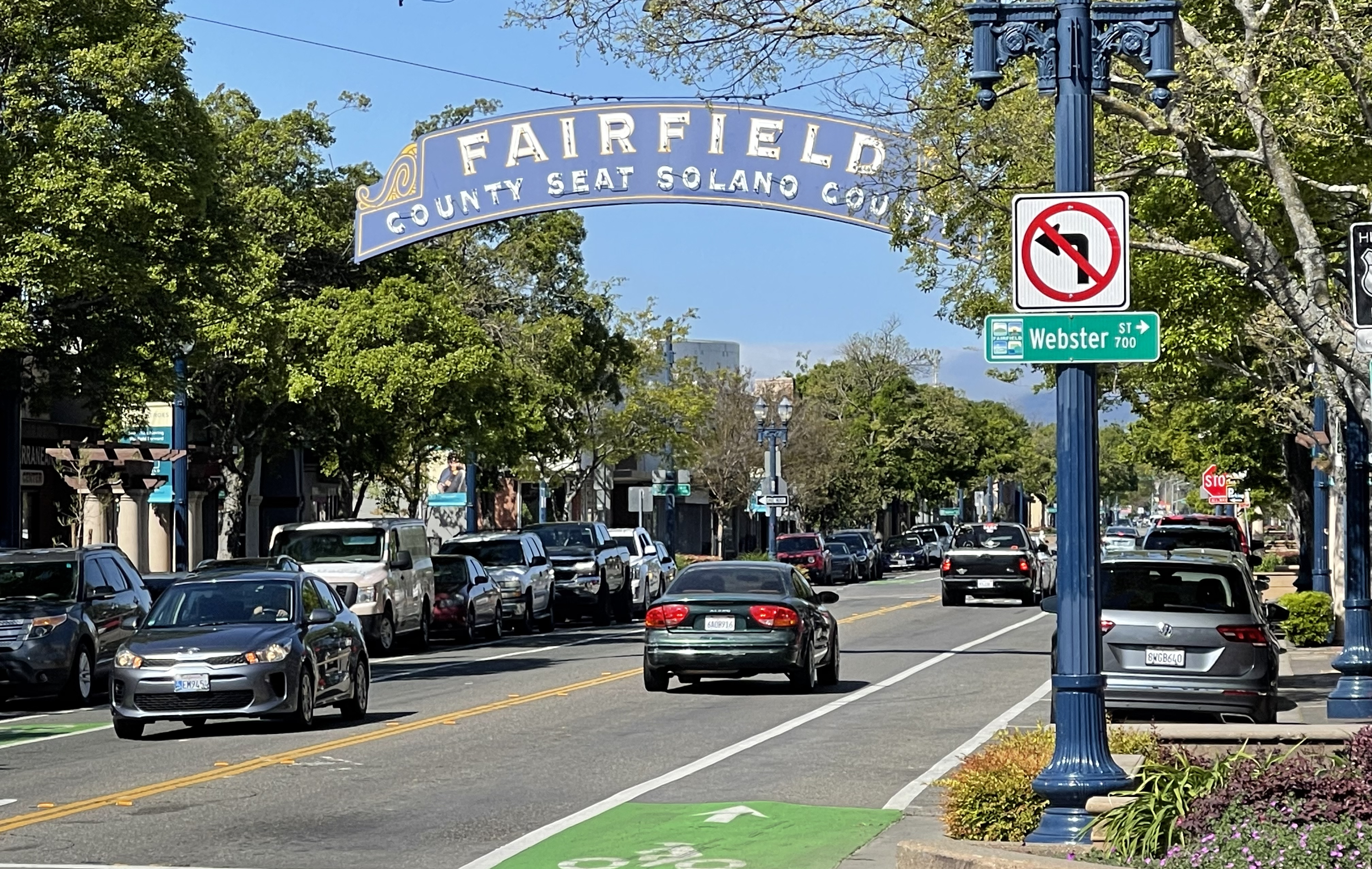
- The Fairfield Arch

- Seal
- Interactive map of Fairfield, California
- Location in California Location in the United States
- Coordinates: 38°15′28″N 122°03′15″W
- Country: United States
- State: California
- County: Solano
- Incorporated: December 12, 1903
- Named after: Fairfield, Connecticut

Government
  - Type: Council-manager
  - City Council: Mayor Rick Vaccaro; Vice-Mayor Pam Bertani (District 4); K. Patrice Williams (District 1); Scott Tonnesen (District 2); Doug Carr (District 3); Manveer Sandhu(District 6); Doriss Panduro (District 5)
  - State senator: Christopher Cabaldon (D)
  - Assemblymember: Lori Wilson (D)
  - U. S. rep.: John Garamendi (D)

Area
  - Total: 41.39 sq mi (107.21 km^{2})
  - Land: 41.14 sq mi (106.55 km^{2})
  - Water: 0.25 sq mi (0.66 km^{2}) 0.62%
- Elevation: 13 ft (4 m)

Population (2020)
  - Total: 119,881
  - Rank: 2nd in Solano County; 49th in California
  - Density: 2,914.0/sq mi (1,125.1/km^{2})
- Time zone: UTC−08:00 (PST)
  - Summer (DST): UTC−07:00 (PDT)
- ZIP codes: 94533–94535
- Area code: 707, 369
- FIPS code: 06-23182
- GNIS feature IDs: 1656005, 2410474
- Website: www.fairfield.ca.gov

Fairfield is a city in and the county seat of Solano County, California, United States, in the North Bay sub-region of the San Francisco Bay Area.

The city has a diversified economy, with government, manufacturing, healthcare, retail, professional and commercial construction sectors.

Fairfield was founded in 1856 by clipper ship captain Robert H. Waterman, and named after his former hometown of Fairfield, Connecticut.

It is the location of Travis Air Force Base and the headquarters of Jelly Belly. The population was 119,881 at the 2020 census.

== History ==
Native Americans such as the Suisun people inhabited the area.

A clipper ship captain from Fairfield, Connecticut, named Robert H. Waterman, parceled out the town in 1856. He entered Fairfield in the race for Solano County seat in 1858, and won it from Benicia. As an inducement, he granted 16 acres (6.5 ha) of land for the construction of county buildings. In 1903, Fairfield was incorporated as a city.

In August 2020, parts of Fairfield were evacuated due to the LNU Lighting Complex Fires, which resulted in the burning of over 315,000 acres (127,476 ha) in five counties, including in nearby Vacaville.

== Geography ==
According to the United States Census Bureau, the city has a total area of 37.6 square miles (97 km^{2}), of which 34.4 square miles (89 km^{2}) is land and 3.2 square miles (8.3 km^{2}), representing 5.65%, is water.

Located within the California Coastal Ranges, the city is centered directly north of the Suisun Bay and northeast of the San Pablo Bay. Much of the Suisun Bay contains the Suisun Marsh, the largest saltwater marsh on the west coast of the United States.

=== Climate ===
Fairfield has a hot-summer Mediterranean climate (Köppen: Csa). Summers have hot afternoons with cool nights with a lengthy dry period, whereas winters see frequent rainfall with mild to cool temperatures.

Climate data for Fairfield, California, 1991–2020 normals, extremes 1950–present
Month	Jan	Feb	Mar	Apr	May	Jun	Jul	Aug	Sep	Oct	Nov	Dec	Year
Record high °F (°C)	76 (24)	80 (27)	89 (32)	98 (37)	111 (44)	111 (44)	114 (46)	111 (44)	117 (47)	104 (40)	87 (31)	78 (26)	117 (47)
Mean maximum °F (°C)	66.8 (19.3)	72.8 (22.7)	78.9 (26.1)	87.2 (30.7)	93.6 (34.2)	102.8 (39.3)	104.1 (40.1)	103.7 (39.8)	100.8 (38.2)	92.5 (33.6)	78.2 (25.7)	67.3 (19.6)	106.7 (41.5)
Mean daily maximum °F (°C)	56.6 (13.7)	61.6 (16.4)	66.4 (19.1)	71.3 (21.8)	77.8 (25.4)	85.4 (29.7)	89.6 (32.0)	89.2 (31.8)	86.9 (30.5)	78.2 (25.7)	65.6 (18.7)	56.7 (13.7)	73.8 (23.2)
Daily mean °F (°C)	48.5 (9.2)	52.2 (11.2)	55.9 (13.3)	59.6 (15.3)	65.0 (18.3)	70.8 (21.6)	73.8 (23.2)	73.6 (23.1)	71.7 (22.1)	65.2 (18.4)	55.4 (13.0)	48.4 (9.1)	61.7 (16.5)
Mean daily minimum °F (°C)	40.4 (4.7)	42.9 (6.1)	45.4 (7.4)	47.9 (8.8)	52.2 (11.2)	56.1 (13.4)	57.9 (14.4)	58.0 (14.4)	56.6 (13.7)	52.3 (11.3)	45.2 (7.3)	40.1 (4.5)	49.6 (9.8)
Mean minimum °F (°C)	30.8 (−0.7)	34.4 (1.3)	36.8 (2.7)	39.0 (3.9)	44.7 (7.1)	48.9 (9.4)	52.3 (11.3)	52.8 (11.6)	49.3 (9.6)	44.4 (6.9)	35.8 (2.1)	29.9 (−1.2)	28.2 (−2.1)
Record low °F (°C)	18 (−8)	24 (−4)	29 (−2)	29 (−2)	35 (2)	39 (4)	40 (4)	40 (4)	39 (4)	32 (0)	21 (−6)	15 (−9)	15 (−9)
Average precipitation inches (mm)	4.68 (119)	4.97 (126)	3.31 (84)	1.47 (37)	0.74 (19)	0.19 (4.8)	0.00 (0.00)	0.03 (0.76)	0.08 (2.0)	1.11 (28)	2.55 (65)	5.40 (137)	24.53 (623)
Average precipitation days (≥ 0.01 in)	10.4	10.0	9.4	5.1	3.2	0.8	0.0	0.2	0.6	2.7	6.5	10.1	59
Source: NOAA (September record high)

== Demographics ==
Historical population
Census	Pop.	Note	%±
1870	329		—
1880	424		28.9%
1910	834		—
1920	1,008		20.9%
1930	1,131		12.2%
1940	1,312		16.0%
1950	3,118		137.7%
1960	14,968		380.1%
1970	44,146		194.9%
1980	58,099		31.6%
1990	77,211		32.9%
2000	96,178		24.6%
2010	105,321		9.5%
2020	119,881		13.8%
2025 (est.)	122,489	▲	2.2%
U.S. Decennial Census

=== Racial and ethnic composition ===
Fairfield city, California – Racial and ethnic composition Note: the US Census treats Hispanic/Latino as an ethnic category. This table excludes Latinos from the racial categories and assigns them to a separate category. Hispanics/Latinos may be of any race.
Race / Ethnicity (NH = Non-Hispanic)	Pop 2000	Pop 2010	Pop 2020	% 2000	% 2010	% 2020
White alone (NH)	47,094	37,091	33,265	48.97%	35.22%	27.75%
Black or African American alone (NH)	14,097	15,979	17,216	14.66%	15.17%	14.36%
Native American or Alaska Native alone (NH)	518	462	384	0.54%	0.44%	0.32%
Asian alone (NH)	10,277	15,265	21,921	10.69%	14.49%	18.29%
Native Hawaiian or Pacific Islander alone (NH)	851	1,049	1,201	0.88%	1.00%	1.00%
Other Race alone (NH)	270	231	660	0.28%	0.22%	0.55%
Mixed race or Multiracial (NH)	5,021	6,455	8,511	5.22%	6.13%	7.10%
Hispanic or Latino (any race)	18,050	28,789	36,723	18.77%	27.33%	30.63%
Total	96,178	105,321	119,881	100.00%	100.00%	100.00%

=== 2020 ===
The 2020 United States census reported that Fairfield had a population of 119,881. The population density was 2,882.4 inhabitants per square mile (1,112.9/km^{2}). The racial makeup was 32.5% White, 14.9% African American, 1.3% Native American, 18.7% Asian, 1.1% Pacific Islander, 16.3% from other races, and 15.2% from two or more races. Hispanic or Latino of any race were 30.6% of the population.

The census reported that 98.6% of the population lived in households, 1.0% lived in non-institutionalized group quarters, and 0.4% were institutionalized.

There were 39,026 households, out of which 39.1% included children under the age of 18, 52.4% were married-couple households, 6.4% were cohabiting couple households, 25.5% had a female householder with no partner present, and 15.7% had a male householder with no partner present. 18.9% of households were one person, and 8.0% were one person aged 65 or older. The average household size was 3.03. There were 29,401 families (75.3% of all households).

The age distribution was 24.2% under the age of 18, 9.6% aged 18 to 24, 27.8% aged 25 to 44, 24.6% aged 45 to 64, and 13.7% who were 65 years of age or older. The median age was 36.1 years. For every 100 females, there were 96.9 males.

There were 40,539 housing units at an average density of 974.7 units per square mile (376.3 units/km^{2}), of which 39,026 (96.3%) were occupied. Of these, 60.2% were owner-occupied, and 39.8% were occupied by renters.

In 2023, the US Census Bureau estimated that the median household income was $102,321, and the per capita income was $41,878. About 7.8% of families and 10.5% of the population were below the poverty line.

=== 2010 ===
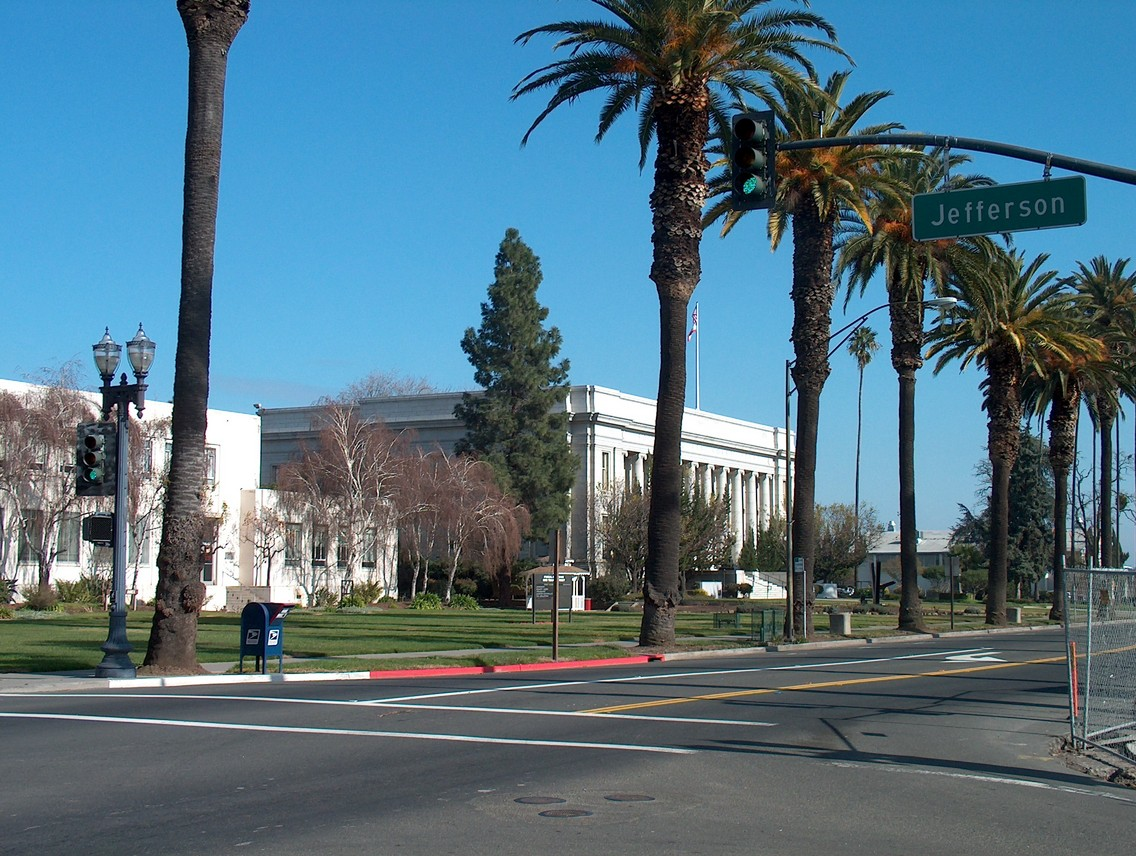
Downtown

The 2010 United States census reported that Fairfield had a population of 105,322. The population density was 2,798.5 inhabitants per square mile (1,080.5/km^{2}). The racial makeup of Fairfield was 48,407 (46.0%) White, 16,586 (15.7%) African American, 869 (0.8%) Native American, 15,700 (14.9%) Asian (9.1% Filipino, 1.8% Indian, 1.0% Chinese, 0.6% Vietnamese, 0.6% Japanese, 0.4% Korean, 0.3% Laotian, 0.2% Thai, 0.1% Pakistani), 1,149 (1.1%) Pacific Islander, 13,301 (12.6%) from other races, and 9,309 (8.8%) from two or more races. Hispanic or Latino of any race were 28,789 persons (27.3%); 21.2% of Fairfield was Mexican, 1.1% Puerto Rican, 1.0% Salvadoran, 0.5% Nicaraguan, 0.3% Guatemalan, 0.2% Cuban, and 0.2% Peruvian.

The Census reported that 102,832 people (97.6% of the population) lived in households, 1,221 (1.2%) lived in non-institutionalized group quarters, and 1,268 (1.2%) were institutionalized.

There were 34,484 households, out of which 14,725 (42.7%) had children under the age of 18 living in them, 18,461 (53.5%) were opposite-sex married couples living together, 5,203 (15.1%) had a female householder with no husband present, 2,179 (6.3%) had a male householder with no wife present. There were 2,052 (6.0%) unmarried opposite-sex partnerships, and 237 (0.7%) same-sex married couples or partnerships. 6,802 households (19.7%) were made up of individuals, and 2,500 (7.2%) had someone living alone who was 65 years of age or older. The average household size was 2.98. There were 25,843 families (74.9% of all households); the average family size was 3.42.

The population was spread out, with 28,499 people (27.1%) under the age of 18, 11,246 people (10.7%) aged 18 to 24, 28,917 people (27.5%) aged 25 to 44, 25,884 people (24.6%) aged 45 to 64, and 10,775 people (10.2%) who were 65 years of age or older. The median age was 33.7 years. For every 100 females, there were 97.0 males. For every 100 females age 18 and over, there were 94.6 males.

There were 37,184 housing units at an average density of 988.0 units per square mile (381.5 units/km^{2}), of which 20,835 (60.4%) were owner-occupied, and 13,649 (39.6%) were occupied by renters. The homeowner vacancy rate was 2.5%; the rental vacancy rate was 7.1%. 61,652 people (58.5% of the population) lived in owner-occupied housing units and 41,180 people (39.1%) lived in rental housing units.

== Economy ==
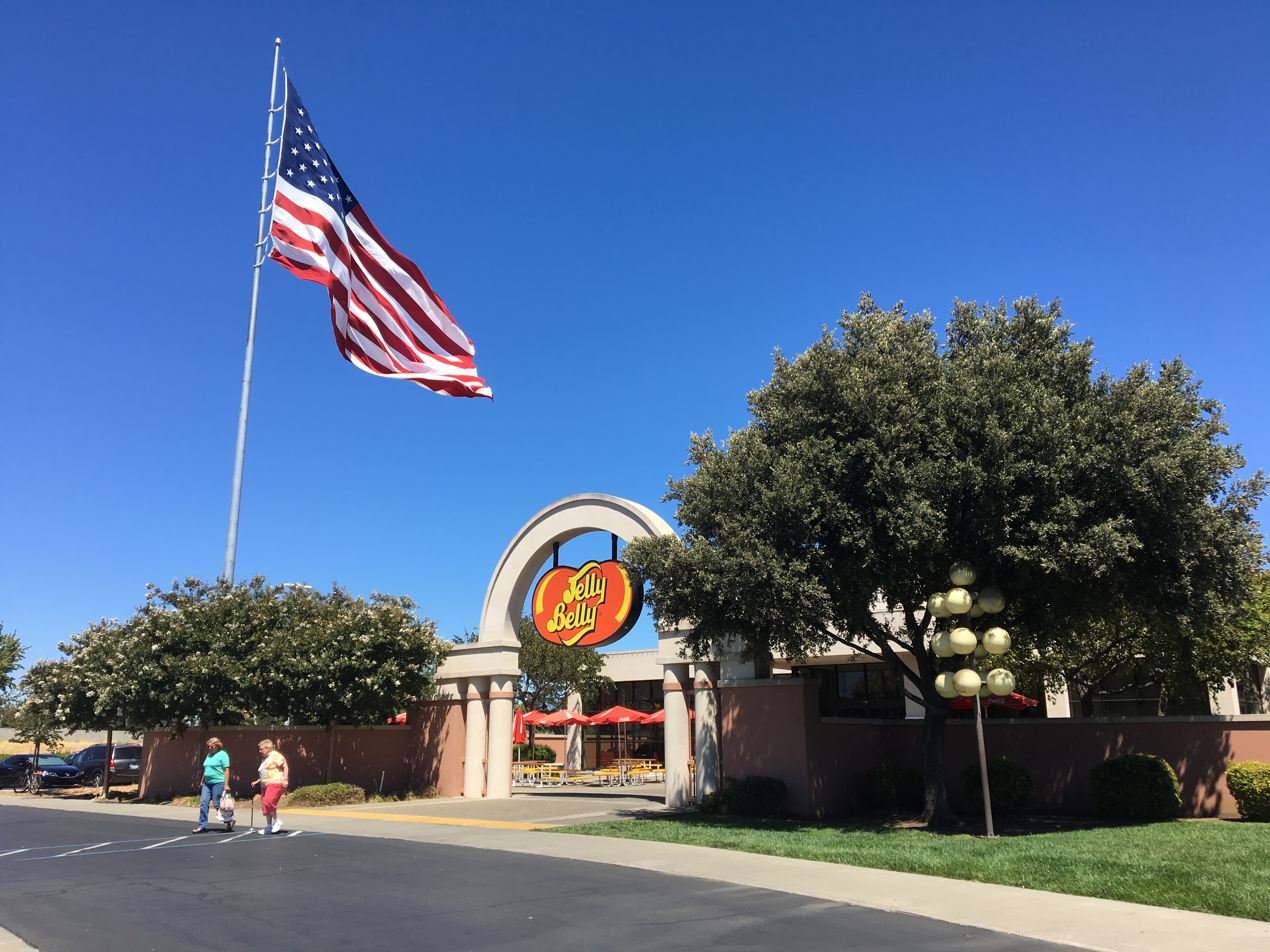
Jelly Belly Candy Company

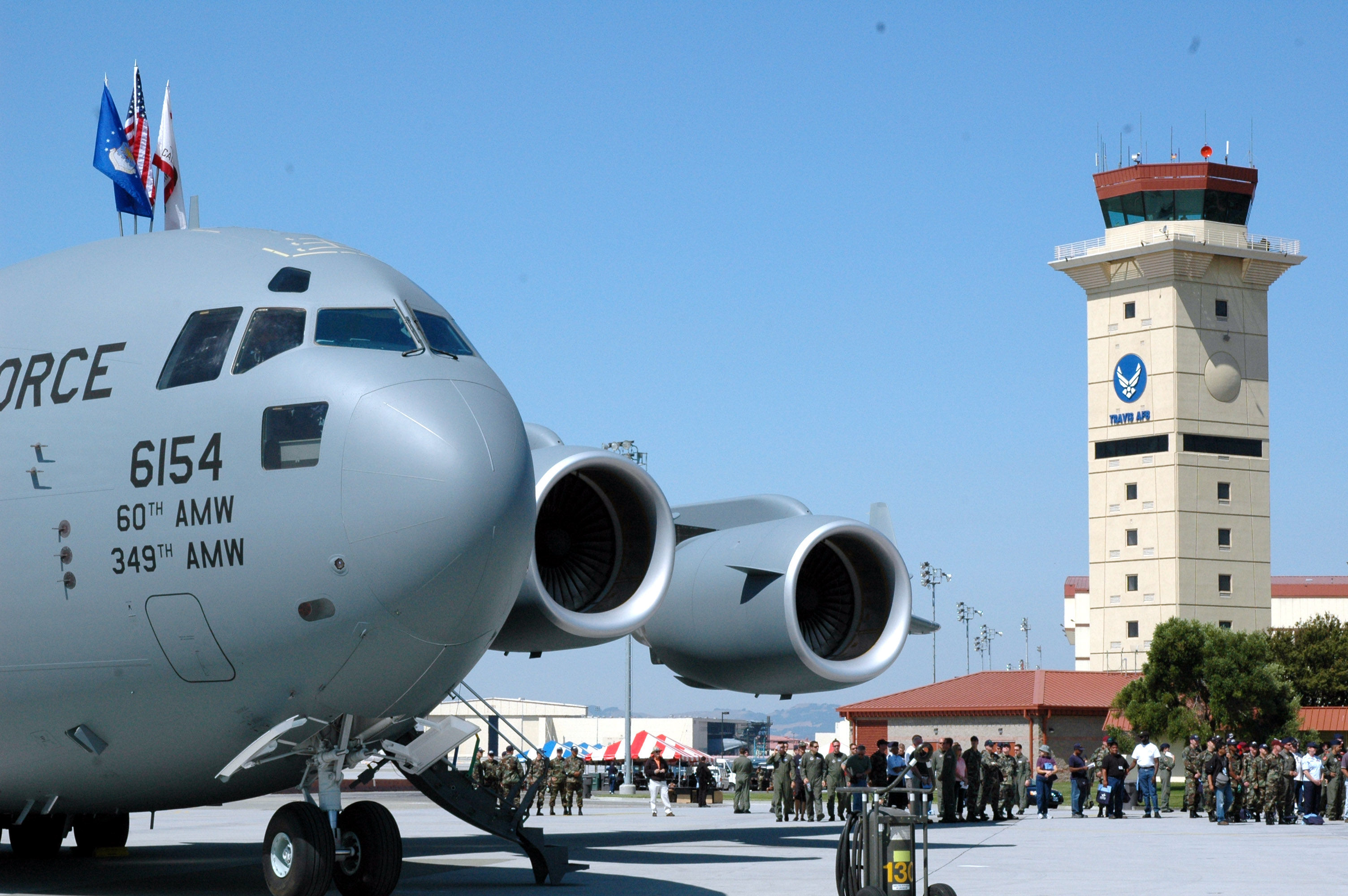
C-17A Globemaster III at Travis Air Force Base

Fairfield has a diversified economy, with government, manufacturing, healthcare, retail, professional and commercial construction sectors. Clorox produces bleach products, and the Jelly Belly Candy Company manufactures its jelly beans in Fairfield. Partnership HealthPlan of California, an insurer, is based in Fairfield. Anheuser-Busch operated a large regional Budweiser brewery from 1976 to 2026.

=== Top employers ===
According to the city's 2021-2022 Popular Annual Financial Report, the top employers in the city are:

#	Employer	# of Employees
1	Travis Air Force Base	13,414
2	County of Solano	2,633
3	Fairfield-Suisun Unified School District	2,213
4	Northbay Healthcare	1,969
5	Solano Community College	750
6	Partnership HealthPlan of California	561
7	City of Fairfield	553
8	Jelly Belly Candy Company	489
9	Sutter Regional Medical Foundation	475
10	Westamerica Bancorporation	418

== Arts and culture ==
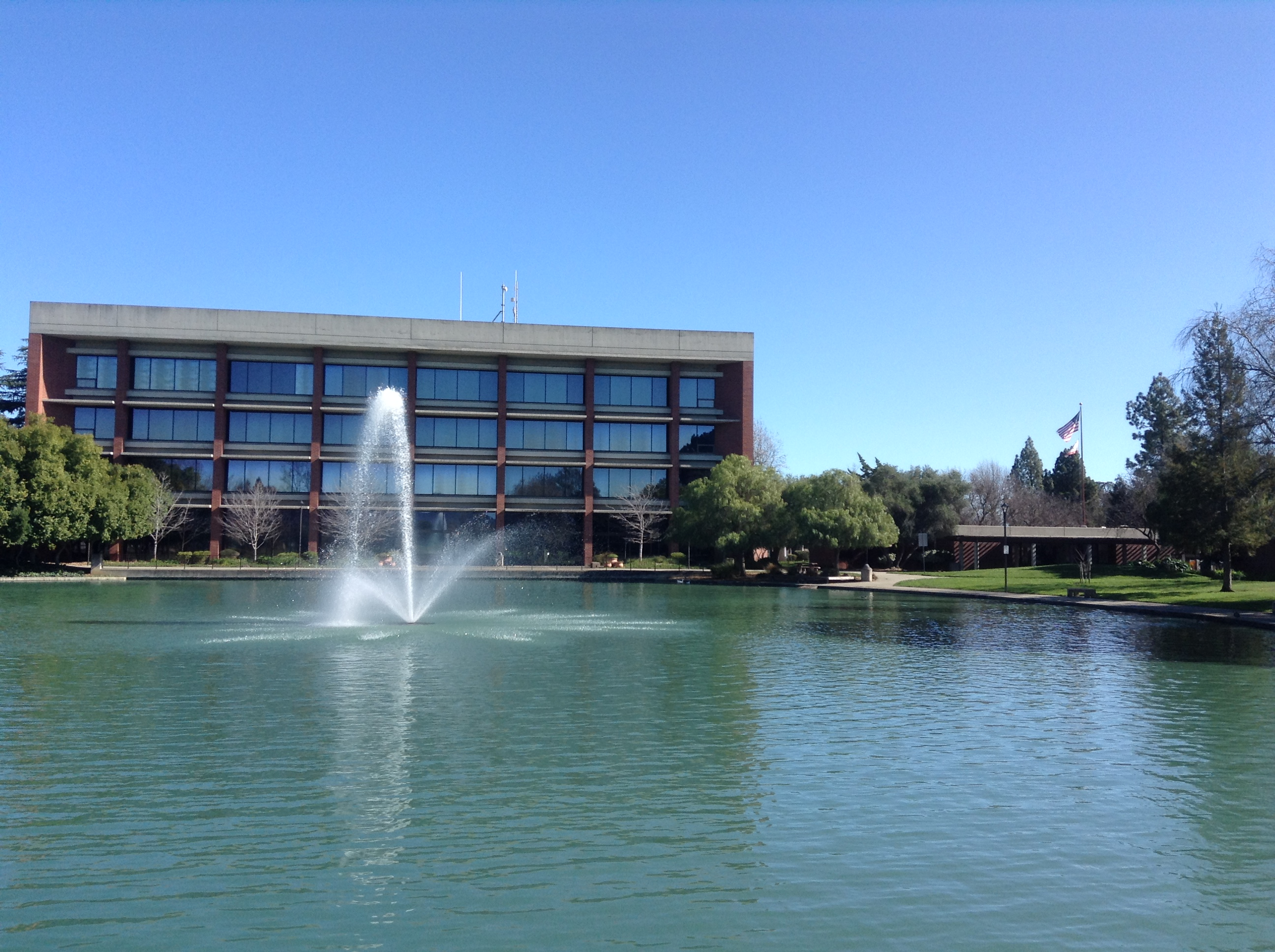
Solano County Library in Fairfield

The city's libraries are operated by Solano County Library, and include Fairfield Civic Center Library, and Fairfield Cordelia Library.

Annual festivals include a Tomato and Vine Festival, 4th of July, and Día de los Muertos.

The City Council appoints a Poet Laureate every two years. The Poet Laureate's role is to advocate for poetry and the advancement of literary arts in the community.

== Parks and recreation ==
Recreation facilities and parks include Community Center, Adult Recreation Center, the Allan Witt Aquatics and Sports Complex, Dunnell Nature Park and Education Center, Laurel Creek Neighborhood Center, and Mankas Neighborhood Center. In 2018, a plan was adopted to renovate the Allan Witt park. A 6 mile section of the old Sacramento Northern Railway right of way has been developed into the Fairfield Linear Park, with a bicycle trail, plazas, and park features.

=== Golf courses ===
Public golf courses include Paradise Valley, and Rancho Solano.

== Government ==
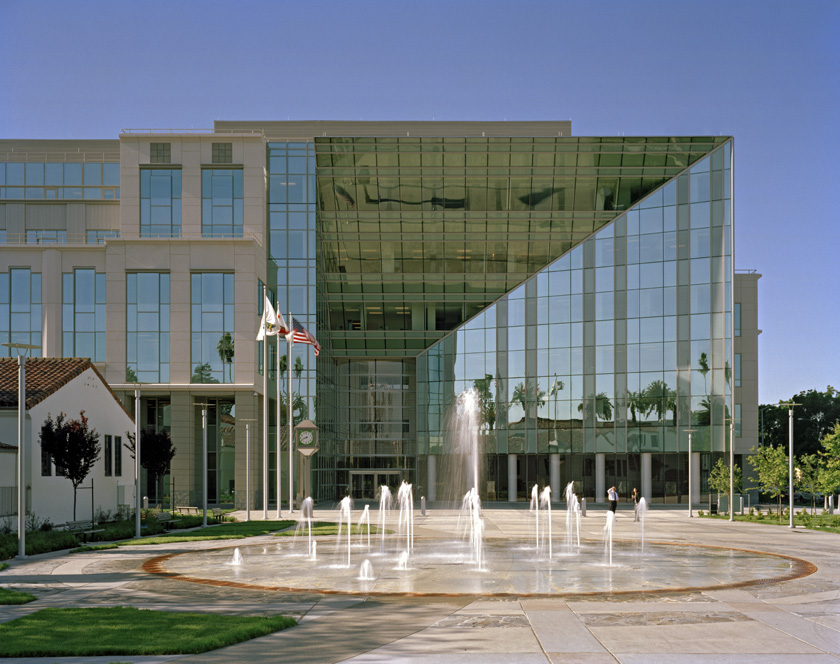
Government center

Prior to 2020, there were five city councilmembers, which include the Vice-Mayor and Mayor. Councilmembers are elected at large for four-year, staggered terms. Elections are held in November of even-numbered years. Beginning in November 2020, city council elections in Fairfield were conducted by district, with six district seats and an at-large mayoral seat for a total of seven council seats.

The government of Fairfield also consists of several committees and commissions. These include the Fairfield Youth Commission, Fairfield CDBG Advisory Committee, Planning Commission, and the Measure P Oversight Commission.

As of September 2022, there were 63,897 registered voters in Fairfield; of these, 32,104 (50.2%) are Democrats, 12,810 (20.0%) are Republicans, and 14,808 (23.2%) stated no party preference.

== Education ==
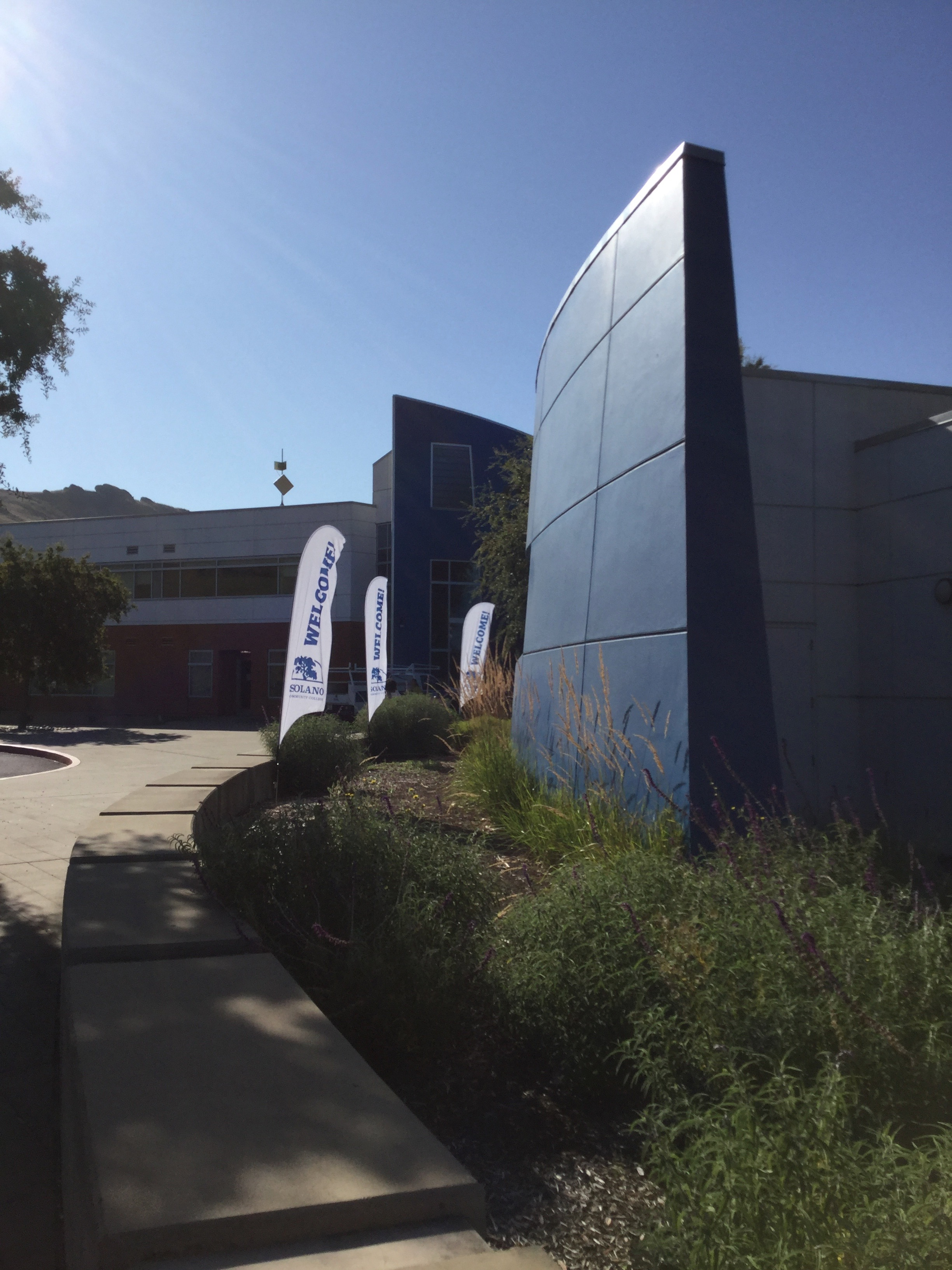
Solano College

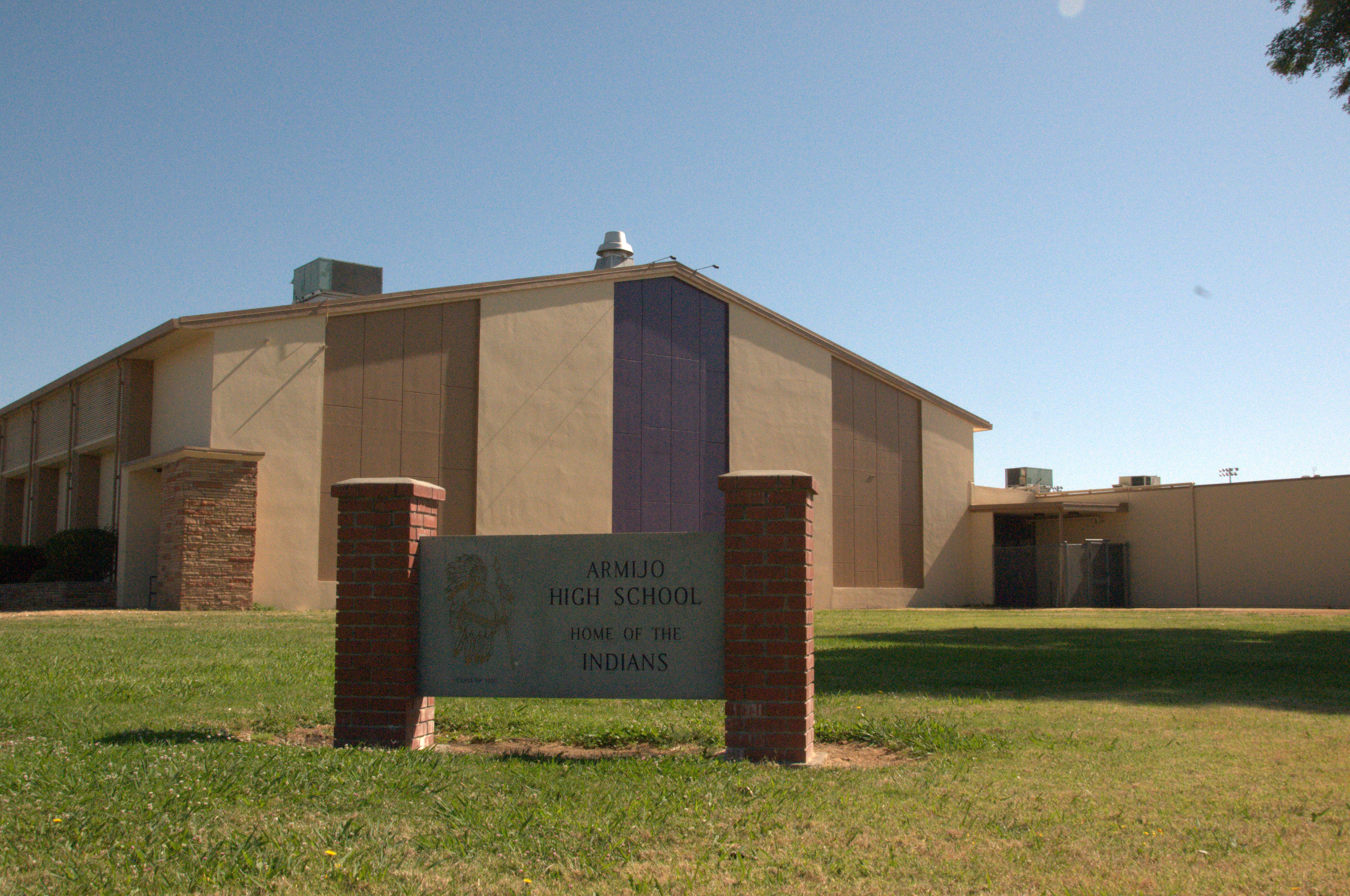
Armijo High School

Public education is administered by Fairfield-Suisun Unified School District in most of the city limits and Travis Unified School District in the eastern portion.

High schools in the Fairfield-Suisun Unified School District include:

- Angelo Rodriguez High School (Early College program)
- Armijo High School (International Baccalaureate program)
- Fairfield High School

High school in the Travis Unified School District include Vanden High School.

Holy Spirit School is a Catholic private school (K-8).

== Infrastructure ==
=== Transportation ===
Highways include Interstate 80, Interstate 680, and State Route 12.

The Fairfield-Vacaville Hannigan railroad station opened in November 2017. The station is served by Capitol Corridor trains operated by Amtrak California.

Fairfield Transportation Center is a transportation hub. Fairfield and Suisun Transit provides local bus service.

=== Healthcare ===
NorthBay Medical Center is a 154-bed hospital with a level II Trauma Center.

== Notable people ==
- Brad Bergesen, starting pitcher for the MLB Baltimore Orioles
- Desmond Bishop, Super Bowl Champion former starting middle linebacker for the NFL Green Bay Packers, Graduated from Fairfield High School class of 2002
- Deone Bucannon, starting safety for the NFL Arizona Cardinals, Graduated from Vanden High School class of 2010
- Chris Daly, former San Francisco supervisor
- Jacob Duran, professional Kickboxing, UFC and boxing cutman/Actor appeared in Rocky Balboa & Creed 1,2
- Huck Flener, MLB Pitcher, graduated from Armijo High School
- Augie Galan, MLB All-Star outfielder, lived and died in Fairfield
- Quinton Ganther, NFL free agent, graduated from Fairfield High School class of 2002
- Luis Grijalva, professional runner representing Guatemala, Olympian, graduated from Armijo High School
- Kathleen Hicks, 35th US Deputy Secretary of Defense, born in Fairfield
- Val Hoyle, U.S. representative for Oregon
- Susan Hutchison, Chair of the Washington State Republican Party, former television news journalist
- James-Michael Johnson, NFL linebacker
- Stevie Johnson, starting NFL wide receiver for the San Diego Chargers
- Lee Kohler, musician and leader of the band This World
- Linda Mabalot, filmmaker and activist who founded the Los Angeles Asian Pacific Film Festival
- Mercedes Moné, professional wrestler for AEW, formerly known as Sasha Banks in WWE
- Pat Morita, Oscar-nominated actor best known as Mr. Miyagi from Karate Kid, longtime Fairfield resident, graduated from Armijo High School
- CC Sabathia, MLB starting pitcher for the New York Yankees and a resident of the Fairfield area
- Alan Sanchez, WBC Continental America's Welterweight Boxing Champion fighting out of Fairfield
- Tony Sanchez (American football), former American College Football coach and player
- Jesse Scholtens, MLB pitcher for the Chicago White Sox
- Chester See, singer, songwriter, producer, prior host of Disney 365 with over one million subscribers on his YouTube channel as of 2013
- Tracy K. Smith, U.S. Poet Laureate, Pulitzer prize winner
- Anthony Swofford, former U.S. Marine and author
- Mychal Threets, American librarian and 2023 ALA Outstanding Public Service Award winner
- Jason Verrett, NFL cornerback for the San Francisco 49ers
- Dominic Wynn Woods, aka Sage the Gemini, rapper, singer, songwriter, and record producer

== Sister cities ==
- Nirasaki, Yamanashi, Japan
