= Angelo Rodriguez High School =

Public high school in California, United States

Location
- 5000 Red Top Road; Fairfield, California 94534; United States; 38.200°N 122.146°W

Information
- Type: Public
- Motto: Failure is not an option
- Established: 2001
- School district: Fairfield-Suisun Unified School District
- Principal: Kristen Cherry
- Grades: 9 to 12
- Enrollment: 2,053 (2023-2024)
- Colors: Green, White, and Black
- Mascot: Mustangs
- Website: www.fsusd.org/rodriguez

Angelo Rodriguez High School is a public high school in Fairfield, California. The school serves about 1,882 students in grades 9 to 12 in the southwest part of Fairfield.

== History ==
Angelo Rodriguez High School is the newest and smallest of the three main high schools in Fairfield, California. The school is named after Angelo Rodriguez, a local English teacher who had drowned off the coast of Spain in 1986 after rescuing two children. This school has been recognized as a California Distinguished School and a National School of Excellence. The school is encompassed into the Fairfield-Suisun Unified School District (FSUSD), which includes several other area high schools, junior high schools, and elementary schools. Their athletic teams are known as the Mustangs and the school colors are green, white, and black.

The school was established in the year 2002, with only freshman and sophomore classes. These students continued instruction at the school for their junior and senior years. By the 2003-04 academic year, the school was offering instruction for students grades 9-12. The class of 2004 was the first graduating class. The class of 2005 was the first graduating class to begin their education at the school as freshmen.

== Campus ==
The campus is smaller than the other Fairfield-Suisun Unified School District high schools. It contains the first school building in Fairfield with two stories, consequently including 4 staircases leading up to the second-story classrooms and an elevator for the handicapped.

The campus also includes a theatre for high school productions that was built in a former auto garage by Nathan Day, the school's former theatre teacher.

In the 2005-06 academic year, the school built their own track, allowing the physical education classes to run and use it. In the year 2006-2007, work began on the Ed Hopkins football stadium, which was not completed until the year 2007-08. The stadium was put to use on September 24, 2007, for a match against Fairfield High School. A pool was completed in the summer of 2008 to allow for aquatic sports.

== Academics ==
Rodriguez High supports an early college high school program, where students complete their high school curriculum while also enrolling in classes at Solano Community College in order to earn college credits, with the goal of students having credits equivalent to two years of instruction transferable to other colleges by their high school graduation. All instruction for these students is carried out at Solano Community College, while they remain enrolled as Rodriguez students. Despite being Rodriguez students, the program is functionally independent, with its own staff, instructors, and student clubs.

== Notable alumni ==
- Stevie Johnson, National Football League wide receiver and one-time head coach of the high school football team.
- Jason Verrett, National Football League cornerback
- James-Michael Johnson, National Football League linebacker
- Marcel Jensen, National Football League tight end
- H.E.R, American singer
- Sage the Gemini, American rapper
- Jesse Scholtens, Major League Baseball pitcher
