= NCAA Division I men's cross country championships =

- Association: NCAA
- Sport: Cross country
- Founded: 1938; 88 years ago
- Division: Division I
- No. of teams: 32 (262 individuals)
- Country: United States
- Most recent champion: New Mexico (1st)
- Most titles: Arkansas (11)

The NCAA Division I men's cross country championships (formerly known as the NCAA University Division cross country championships) are contested at an annual meet hosted by the National Collegiate Athletic Association to determine the individual and team national champions of men's collegiate cross country running among its Division I members in the United States. It has been held every fall (typically in November) since the NCAA split into its current three-division format in 1973.

The teams and individual runners qualify for the championship at regional competitions approximately a week before the national championships.

Arkansas has been the most successful program, with eleven national titles.

New Mexico is the defending team national champion, winning their first title in 2026.

== History ==
Almost each year in the autumn since 1938, with the only exception of 1943 and 2020, the National Collegiate Athletic Association has hosted men's cross country championships. Since 1958, the NCAA has had multiple division championships. Since 1973, Divisions I, II and III have all had their own national championships.

The field for the Division I national championship race has ranged in size from a low of 6 teams in 1938, to a high of 39 teams in 1970. From 1982 to 1997, the field was fixed at 22 teams. From 1998 to 2024, the field was increased to 31 teams, and then starting in 2025, a total of 32 teams now compete annually for the championship. The 32-team field will increase the total male and female competitors from 255 to 262. The reason for this change is an increase in collegiate programs across the country in recent years, and a belief that the increased teams will improve competition while still being comfortably accommodated on the cross-country course.

The race distance from 1938 to 1964 was 4 miles (6.4 km). From 1965 to 1975, the race distance was 6 miles (9.7 km). Since 1976, the race distance has been 10,000 meters (6.2 mi).

Wisconsin and Syracuse are the only two teams East of the Mississippi River that have won in the 21st Century.

== Qualifying ==
Teams compete in one of nine regional championships to qualify, where the top two teams automatically advance. Fourteen additional teams will be selected for a 32 team field. 28 individuals will be selected to participate in each championship through an automatic qualifier. The first four regional finishers not from automatic qualifying teams also secure an auto-bid to the championship round.

== Results ==
- Prior to 1958, only a single national championship was held between all members of the NCAA; Division II started in 1958 and Division III in 1973.

NCAA Men's Division I Cross Country Championship
Year	Host City (Host Team)	Team Championship				Individual Championship	
Year	Host City (Host Team)	Winner	Points	Runner-up	Points	Winner (Team)	Time
1938; Details	East Lansing, MI (Michigan State)	Indiana	51	Notre Dame	61	Greg Rice (Notre Dame)	20:12.9
1939; Details	East Lansing, MI (Michigan State)	Michigan State	54	Wisconsin	57	Walter Mehl (Wisconsin)	20:30.9
1940; Details	East Lansing, MI (Michigan State)	Indiana	65	Eastern Michigan	68	Gil Dodds (Ashland)	20:30.2
1941; Details	East Lansing, MI (Michigan State)	Rhode Island	83	Penn State	110	Fred Wilt (Indiana)	20:32.1
1942; Details	East Lansing, MI (Michigan State)	Indiana; Penn State	57	Rhode Island	79	Oliver Hunter (Notre Dame)	20:18.0
1943	Not Held due to World War II						
1944; Details	East Lansing, MI (Michigan State)	Drake	25	Notre Dame	64	Fred Feiler (Drake)	21:04.2
1945; Details	East Lansing, MI (Michigan State)	Drake	50	Notre Dame	65	Fred Feiler (Drake)	21:14.2
1946; Details	East Lansing, MI (Michigan State)	Drake	42	NYU	98	Quentin Brelsford (Ohio Wesleyan)	20:22.9
1947; Details	East Lansing, MI (Michigan State)	Penn State	60	Syracuse	72	Jack Milne (North Carolina)	20:41.1
1948; Details	East Lansing, MI (Michigan State)	Michigan State	41	Wisconsin	69	Robert Black (Rhode Island)	19:52.3
1949; Details	East Lansing, MI (Michigan State)	Michigan State	59	Syracuse	81	Robert Black (Rhode Island)	20:25.7
1950; Details	East Lansing, MI (Michigan State)	Penn State	53	Michigan State	55	Herb Semper (Kansas)	20:31.7
1951; Details	East Lansing, MI (Michigan State)	Syracuse	80	Kansas	118	Herb Semper (Kansas)	20:09.5
1952; Details	East Lansing, MI (Michigan State)	Michigan State	65	Indiana	68	Charles Capozzoli (Georgetown)	19:36.7
1953; Details	East Lansing, MI (Michigan State)	Kansas	70	Indiana	82	Wes Santee (Kansas)	19:43.5
1954; Details	East Lansing, MI (Michigan State)	Oklahoma State	61	Syracuse	118	Allen Frame (Kansas)	19:54.2
1955; Details	East Lansing, MI (Michigan State)	Michigan State	46	Kansas	68	Charles Jones (Iowa)	19:57.4
1956; Details	East Lansing, MI (Michigan State)	Michigan State	28	Kansas	88	Walter McNew (Texas)	19:55.7
1957; Details	East Lansing, MI (Michigan State)	Notre Dame	121	Michigan State	127	Max Truex (USC)	19:12.3†
1958; Details	East Lansing, MI (Michigan State)	Michigan State	79	Western Michigan	104	Crawford Kennedy (Michigan State)	20:07.1
1959; Details	East Lansing, MI (Michigan State)	Michigan State	44	Houston	120	Al Lawrence (Houston)	20:35.7
1960; Details	East Lansing, MI (Michigan State)	Houston	54	Michigan State	80	Al Lawrence (Houston)	19:28.2
1961; Details	East Lansing, MI (Michigan State)	Oregon State	68	San Jose State	82	Dale Story (Oregon State)	19:46.6
1962; Details	East Lansing, MI (Michigan State)	San Jose State	58	Villanova	69	Tom O'Hara (Loyola–Chicago)	19:20.3
1963; Details	East Lansing, MI (Michigan State)	San Jose State	53	Oregon	68	Victor Zwolak (Villanova)	19:35.0
1964; Details	East Lansing, MI (Michigan State)	Western Michigan	86	Oregon	116	Elmore Banton (Ohio)	20:07.5
The race distance changes from 4 miles to 6 miles
1965; Details	Lawrence, KS (Kansas)	Western Michigan	81	Northwestern	114	John Lawson (Kansas)	29:24.0
1966; Details	Lawrence, KS (Kansas)	Villanova	79	Kansas State	155	Gerry Lindgren (Washington State)	29:01.4
1967; Details	Laramie, WY (Wyoming)	Villanova	91	Air Force	96	Gerry Lindgren (Washington State)	30:45.6
1968; Details	Bronx, NY (Manhattan)	Villanova	78	Stanford	100	Michael Ryan (Air Force)	29:16.8
1969; Details	Bronx, NY (Manhattan)	UTEP	74	Villanova	88	Gerry Lindgren (Washington State)	28:59.2
1970; Details	Williamsburg, VA (William & Mary)	Villanova	85	Oregon	86	Steve Prefontaine (Oregon)	28:00.2†
1971; Details	Knoxville, TN (Tennessee)	Oregon	83	Washington State	122	Steve Prefontaine (Oregon)	29:14.0
1972; Details	Houston, TX (Houston)	Tennessee	134	East Tennessee State	148	Neil Cusack (East Tennessee State)	28:23.0
1973; Details	Pullman, WA (Washington State)	Oregon	89	UTEP	157	Steve Prefontaine (Oregon)	28:14.8
1974; Details	Bloomington, IN (Indiana)	Oregon	77	Western Kentucky	110	Nick Rose (Western Kentucky)	29:22.00
1975; Details	State College, PA (Penn State)	UTEP	88	Oregon	92	Craig Virgin (Illinois)	28:23.3
*The race distance changes from 6 miles to 10 kilometers
1976; Details	Denton, TX (North Texas)	UTEP	62	Oregon	117	Henry Rono (Washington State)	28:06.6†
1977; Details	Pullman, WA (Washington State)	Oregon	100	UTEP	105	Henry Rono (Washington State)	28:33.5
1978; Details	Madison, WI (Wisconsin)	UTEP	56	Oregon	72	Alberto Salazar (Oregon)	29:29.7
1979; Details	Bethlehem, PA (Lehigh)	UTEP	86	Oregon	93	Henry Rono (Washington State)	28:19.6
1980; Details	Wichita, KS (Wichita State)	UTEP	58	Arkansas	152	Suleiman Nyambui (UTEP)	29:04.0
1981; Details	Wichita, KS (Wichita State)	UTEP	17	Providence	109	Matthews Motshwarateu (UTEP)	28:45.6
1982; Details	Bloomington, IN (Indiana)	Wisconsin	59	Providence	138	Mark Scrutton (Colorado)	30:12.6
1983; Details	Bethlehem, PA (Lehigh)	(Vacated)	108	Wisconsin	164	Zakarie Barie (UTEP)	29:20.0
1984; Details	State College, PA (Penn State)	Arkansas	101	Arizona	111	Ed Eyestone (BYU)	29:28.8
1985; Details	Milwaukee, WI (Marquette)	Wisconsin	67	Arkansas	104	Tim Hacker (Wisconsin)	29:17.88
1986; Details	Tucson, AZ (Arizona)	Arkansas	69	Dartmouth	141	Aaron Ramirez (Arizona)	30:27.53
1987; Details	Charlottesville, VA (Virginia)	Arkansas	87	Dartmouth	119	Joe Falcon (Arkansas)	29:14.97
1988; Details	Ames, IA (Iowa State)	Wisconsin	105	Northern Arizona	160	Bob Kennedy (Indiana)	29:20.00
1989; Details	Annapolis, MD (Navy)	Iowa State	54	Oregon	72	John Nuttall (Iowa State)	29:30.55
1990; Details	Knoxville, TN (Tennessee)	Arkansas	68	Iowa State	96	Jonah Koech (Iowa State)	29:05
1991; Details	Tucson, AZ (Arizona)	Arkansas	52	Wisconsin	148	Sean Dollman (Western Kentucky)	30:17.1
1992; Details	Bloomington, IN (Indiana)	Arkansas	46	Wisconsin	87	Bob Kennedy (Indiana)	30:15.3
1993; Details	Bethlehem, PA (Lehigh)	Arkansas	31	BYU	153	Josephat Kapkory (Washington State)	29:32.4
1994; Details	Fayetteville, AR (Arkansas)	Iowa State	65	Colorado	88	Martin Keino (Arizona)	30:08.7
1995; Details	Ames, IA (Iowa State)	Arkansas	100	Northern Arizona	142	Godfrey Siamusiye (Arkansas)	30:09
1996; Details	Tucson, AZ (Arizona)	Stanford	46	Arkansas	74	Godfrey Siamusiye (Arkansas)	29:49
1997; Details	Greenville, SC (Furman)	Stanford	53	Arkansas	56	Mebrahtom Keflezighi (UCLA)	28:54
1998; Details	Lawrence, KS (Kansas)	Arkansas	97	Stanford	114	Adam Goucher (Colorado)	29:26.9
1999; Details	Bloomington, IN (Indiana)	Arkansas	58	Wisconsin	185	David Kimani (South Alabama)	30:06.6
2000; Details	Ames, IA (Iowa State)	Arkansas	83	Colorado	94	Keith Kelly (Providence)	30:14.5
2001; Details	Greenville, SC (Furman)	Colorado	90	Stanford	91	Boaz Cheboiywo (Eastern Michigan)	28:47
2002; Details	Terre Haute, IN (Indiana State)	Stanford	47	Wisconsin	107	Jorge Torres (Colorado)	29:04.7
2003; Details	Cedar Falls, IA (Northern Iowa)	Stanford	24	Wisconsin	147	Dathan Ritzenhein (Colorado)	29:14.1
2004; Details	Terre Haute, IN (Indiana State)	Colorado	90	Wisconsin	94	Simon Bairu (Wisconsin)	30:37.7
2005; Details	Terre Haute, IN (Indiana State)	Wisconsin	37	Arkansas	105	Simon Bairu (Wisconsin)	29:15.9
2006; Details	Terre Haute, IN (Indiana State)	Colorado	94	Wisconsin	142	Josh Rohatinsky (BYU)	30:44.9
2007; Details	Terre Haute, IN (Indiana State)	Oregon	85	Iona	113	Josh McDougal (Liberty)	29:22.4
2008; Details	Terre Haute, IN (Indiana State)	Oregon	93	Iona	147	Galen Rupp (Oregon)	29:03.2
2009; Details	Terre Haute, IN (Indiana State)	Oklahoma State	127	Oregon	143	Sam Chelanga (Liberty)	28:41.3
2010; Details	Terre Haute, IN (Indiana State)	Oklahoma State	73	Florida State	193	Sam Chelanga (Liberty)	29:22.2
2011; Details	Terre Haute, IN (Indiana State)	Wisconsin	97	Oklahoma State	139	Lawi Lalang (Arizona)	28:44.1
2012; Details	Louisville, KY (Louisville)	Oklahoma State	72	Wisconsin	135	Kennedy Kithuka (Texas Tech)	28:31.3
2013; Details	Terre Haute, IN (Indiana State)	Colorado	149	Northern Arizona	169	Edward Cheserek (Oregon)	29:41.1
2014; Details	Terre Haute, IN (Indiana State)	Colorado	65	Stanford	98	Edward Cheserek (Oregon)	30:19.4
2015; Details	Louisville, KY (Louisville)	Syracuse	82	Colorado	91	Edward Cheserek (Oregon)	28:45.8
2016; Details	Terre Haute, IN (Indiana State)	Northern Arizona	125	Stanford	158	Patrick Tiernan (Villanova)	29:22.0
2017; Details	Louisville, KY (Louisville)	Northern Arizona	74	Portland	127	Justyn Knight (Syracuse)	29:00.2
2018; Details	Madison, WI (Wisconsin)	Northern Arizona	83	BYU	116	Morgan McDonald (Wisconsin)	29:08.3
2019; Details	Terre Haute, IN (Indiana State)	BYU	109	Northern Arizona	163	Edwin Kurgat (Iowa State)	30:32.7
2020; Details	Stillwater, OK (Oklahoma State)	Northern Arizona	60	Notre Dame	87	Conner Mantz (BYU)	29:26.1
2021; Details	Tallahassee, FL (Florida State)	Northern Arizona	92	Iowa State	137	Conner Mantz (BYU)	28:33.1
2022; Details	Stillwater, OK (Oklahoma State)	Northern Arizona	83	Oklahoma State	83	Charles Hicks (Stanford)	28:43.6
2023; Details	Charlottesville, VA (Virginia)	Oklahoma State	49	Northern Arizona	71	Graham Blanks (Harvard)	28:37.7
2024; Details	Madison, WI (Wisconsin)	BYU	124	Iowa State	137	Graham Blanks (Harvard)	28:37.2
2025; Details	Columbia, MO (Missouri)	Oklahoma State	57	New Mexico	82	Habtom Samuel (New Mexico)	28:33.9
2026; Details	Terre Haute, IN (Indiana State)	New Mexico	69	Colorado	107	Elsingi Kipruto (Loisville)	28.27.7
2027; Details	Stillwater, OK (Oklahoma State)						

- A time highlighted in ██ indicates an NCAA championship record time for that distance at the time.
- A † indicates the all-time NCAA championship record for that distance.
- UTEP's 1983 championship was vacated by the NCAA Committee on Infractions.

== Champions ==
=== Team titles ===
- List updated through the 2026 Championships

Team	#	Winning years
Arkansas	11	1984, 1986, 1987, 1990, 1991, 1992, 1993, 1995, 1998, 1999, 2000
Michigan State	8	1939, 1948, 1949, 1952, 1955, 1956, 1958, 1959
UTEP	7	1969, 1975, 1976, 1978, 1979, 1980, 1981
Northern Arizona	6	2016, 2017, 2018, 2020, 2021, 2022
Oklahoma State	6	1954, 2009, 2010, 2012, 2023, 2025
Oregon	6	1971, 1973, 1974, 1977, 2007, 2008
Colorado	5	2001, 2004, 2006, 2013, 2014
Wisconsin	5	1982, 1985, 1988, 2005, 2011
Stanford	4	1996, 1997, 2002, 2003
Villanova	4	1966, 1967, 1968, 1970
Drake	3	1944, 1945, 1946
Indiana	3	1938, 1940, 1942
Penn State	3	1942, 1947, 1950
BYU	2	2019, 2024
Iowa State	2	1989, 1994
San Jose State	2	1962, 1963
Syracuse	2	1951, 2015
Western Michigan	2	1964, 1965
New Mexico	1	2026
Tennessee	1	1972
Oregon State	1	1961
Houston	1	1960
Notre Dame	1	1957
Kansas	1	1953
Rhode Island	1	1941

=== Individual titles ===
- List updated through the 2026 Championships.

Team	#
Oregon	8
Washington State	7
Kansas	5
Wisconsin	5
Colorado	4
BYU	4
Arizona	3
Arkansas	3
Indiana	3
Iowa State	3
Liberty	3
UTEP	3
Drake	2
Harvard	2
Houston	2
Notre Dame	2
Rhode Island	2
Villanova	2
Western Kentucky	2
New Mexico	1
Louisville	1

== Appearances ==
- List updated through the 2025 Championships.

=== Most team appearances (top 15) ===
Rank	Team	Appearances
1	Wisconsin	62
2	Notre Dame	56
3	Colorado	55
4	Arkansas	54
5	Oregon	48
6	Michigan State	47
7	Providence	42
7	Georgetown	42
9	BYU	41
9	Penn State	41
1	Texas	40
12	Villanova	38
12	Oklahoma State	38
14	Michigan	37
15	Northern Arizona	35

== Records ==
- Best Team Score: 17
  - UTEP (1981; Matthews Motshwarateu–1, Michael Musyoki–2, Gabriel Kaman–3, Suleiman Nyambui–5, Gidamis Shahanga–6)
- Most Individual Titles: 3 (tie)
  - Gerry Lindgren, Washington State (1966, 1967, and 1969)
  - Steve Prefontaine, Oregon (1970, 1971, and 1973)
  - (Kenya) Henry Rono, Washington State (1976, 1977, and 1979)
  - (Kenya) Edward Cheserek, Oregon (2013, 2014, and 2015)
- Best Individual Time, 4 miles: 19:21.3
  - Max Truex, USC (1957)
- Best Individual Time, 6 miles: 28:00.2
  - Steve Prefontaine, Oregon (1970)
- Best Individual Time, 10,000 meters: 28:06.6
  - Henry Rono, Washington State (1976)

== See also ==
- NCAA Men's Division I Outdoor Track and Field Championships
- NCAA Men's Division II Cross Country Championship (from 1958)
- NCAA Men's Division III Cross Country Championship (from 1973)
- NCAA Women's Division I Cross Country Championship (from 1981)
- NCAA Women's Division II Cross Country Championship (from 1981)
- NCAA Women's Division III Cross Country Championship (from 1981)
- Pre-NCAA Cross Country Champions
- NAIA Cross Country Championships (Men, Women)
