= Notre Dame Fighting Irish men's cross country =

Notre Dame Fighting Irish men's Cross Country
- University: University of Notre Dame
- Athletic director: Pete Bevacqua
- Head coach: Matt Sparks (7th season)
- Conference: ACC
- Location: Notre Dame, IN
- Nickname: Fighting Irish
- Colors: Blue and gold

National championships
- 1957

NCAA Championship appearances
- 1938, 1939, 1940, 1941, 1942, 1944, 1945, 1946, 1947, 1948, 1949, 1950, 1951, 1952, 1954, 1955, 1956, 1957, 1958, 1959, 1960, 1962, 1963, 1964, 1965, 1966, 1984, 1987, 1988, 1990, 1992, 1993, 1994, 1995, 1996, 1997, 1999, 2000, 2001, 2002, 2004, 2005, 2006, 2007, 2010, 2011, 2012, 2013, 2018, 2019, 2020, 2021, 2022, 2023

Conference champions
- 1982, 1984, 1985, 1988, 1989, 1990, 1991, 1992, 1993, 1994, 1997, 1999, 2001, 2004, 2005, 2018, 2020, 2021

Notre Dame Fighting Irish men's cross country is one of the cross country team of the University of Notre Dame in Notre Dame, Indiana The Fighting Irish compete in the Atlantic Coast Conference at the Division I level in the NCAA and are head coached by Matt Sparks.

== National Championships ==
=== Team National Championship ===
Year	Runner-up	Score
1957	Michigan State	121-127

=== Individual National Champions ===
Year	Athlete	Time
1938	Greg Rice	20:12.9
1942	Oliver Hunter	20:18.0

== Championship results ==
Year	Coach	Place	Points
2023	Matt Sparks	14th	398
2022	Matt Sparks	15th	450
2021	Matt Sparks	9th	290
2020*	Matt Sparks	2nd	87
2019	Matt Sparks	8th	269
2018	Matt Sparks	14th	401
2013	Joe Piane	22nd	480
2012	Joe Piane	28th	590
2011	Joe Piane	24th	575
2010	Joe Piane	25th	571
2007	Joe Piane	21st	467
2006	Joe Piane	19th	495
2005	Joe Piane	3rd	178
2004	Joe Piane	11th	350
2002	Joe Piane	22nd	527
2001	Joe Piane	6th	248
2000	Joe Piane	9th	276
1999	Joe Piane	8th	312
1997	Joe Piane	12th	309
1996	Joe Piane	9th	248
1995	Joe Piane	9th	237
1994	Joe Piane	13th	313
1993	Joe Piane	5th	200
1992	Joe Piane	6th	245
1990	Joe Piane	3rd	185
1988	Joe Piane	9th	250
1987	Joe Piane	8th	265
1984	Joe Piane	19th	354
1966	Alex Wilson	21st	456
1965	Alex Wilson	7th	225
1964	Alex Wilson	4th	122
1963	Alex Wilson	3rd	125
1962	Alex Wilson	11th	251
1960	Alex Wilson	10th	252
1959	Alex Wilson	4th	141
1958	Alex Wilson	4th	114
1957	Alex Wilson	1st	121
1956	Alex Wilson	6th	175
1955	Alex Wilson	3rd	95
1954	Alex Wilson	6th	160
1952	Alex Wilson	12th	275
1951	Alex Wilson	11th	231
1950	Alex Wilson	5th	110
1949	ER "Doc" Handy	10th	265
1948	ER "Doc" Handy	5th	164
1947	ER "Doc" Handy	9th	223
1946	ER "Doc" Handy	10th	267
1945	ER "Doc" Handy	2nd	65
1944	ER "Doc" Handy	2nd	64
1942	ER "Doc" Handy	6th	145
1941	William Mahoney	6th	137
1940	William Mahoney	5th	115
1939	John Nicholson	8th	217
1938	John Nicholson	2nd	61

== Coaches ==
Coach	Tenure
Matt Sparks	2018–Present
Alan Turner	2014-2018
Joe Piane	1974-2014
Don Faley	1972-1974
Alex Wilson	1950-1972
ER "Doc" Handy	1942-1950
William Mahoney	1940-1942
John Nicholson	1927-1940
Knute Rockne	1916-1927
No Coach	1890-1916
