= 1950 NCAA cross country championships =

1950 cross-country running meet of the NCAA

1950 NCAA Cross Country Championships
- Organisers: NCAA
- Edition: 12th
- Date: November 27, 1950
- Host city: East Lansing, MI; Michigan State College
- Venue: Forest Akers East Golf Course
- Distances: 4 miles (6.4 km)
- Participation: 66 athletes

The 1950 NCAA Cross Country Championships were the 12th annual cross country meet to determine the team and individual national champions of men's collegiate cross country running in the United States.

Since the current multi-division format for NCAA championship did not begin until 1973, all NCAA members were eligible. In total, 17 teams and 66 individual runners contested this championship.

The meet was hosted by Michigan State College on November 27, 1950, at the Forest Akers East Golf Course in East Lansing, Michigan. The distance for the race was 4 miles (6.4 kilometers).

The team national championship was won by the Penn State Nittany Lions, their third. The individual championship was won by Herb Semper, from Kansas, with a time of 20:31.7.

== Men's title ==
- Distance: 4 miles (6.4 kilometers)

=== Team Result (Top 10) ===
Rank	Team	Points
1st place, gold medalist(s)	Penn State	53
2nd place, silver medalist(s)	Michigan State College	55
3rd place, bronze medalist(s)	Wisconsin	65
4	Kansas	91
5	Notre Dame	110
6	Purdue	148
7	Michigan State Teachers	194
8	Lawrence	208
9	Albion	248
