= 1940 NCAA cross country championships =

1940 cross-country running meet of the NCAA

1940 NCAA Men's Cross Country Championships
- Organisers: NCAA
- Edition: 3rd
- Date: November 25, 1940
- Host city: East Lansing, MI; Michigan State College
- Venue: Forest Akers East Golf Course
- Distances: 4 miles (6.4 km)
- Participation: 90 athletes

The 1940 NCAA Cross Country Championships were the third annual cross country meet to determine the team and individual national champions of men's collegiate cross country running in the United States.

Since the current multi-division format for NCAA championship did not begin until 1973, all NCAA members were eligible. In total, 21 teams and 90 individual runners contested this championship.

The meet was hosted by Michigan State College at the Forest Akers East Golf Course in East Lansing, Michigan for the third consecutive time. Additionally, the distance for the race was 4 miles (6.4 kilometers).

The team national championship was won by the Indiana Hoosiers, their second, while the individual championship was won by Gil Dodds, from Ashland, with a time of 20:30.2.

== Men's title ==
- Distance: 4 miles

=== Team result ===
Rank	Team	Points
1st place, gold medalist(s)	Indiana	65
2nd place, silver medalist(s)	Michigan State Normal	68
3rd place, bronze medalist(s)	Rhode Island State	91
4	Michigan State College	102
5	Notre Dame	115
6	Ohio State	123
7	Drake	168
8	Oberlin	193
9	Alfred	195
10	Earlham	288
