= 1939 NCAA cross country championships =

1939 cross-country running meet of the NCAA

1939 NCAA Cross Country Championships
- Organisers: NCAA
- Edition: 2nd
- Date: November 27, 1939
- Host city: East Lansing, MI; Michigan State College
- Venue: Forest Akers East Golf Course
- Distances: 4 miles (6.4 km)
- Participation: 67 athletes

The 1939 NCAA Cross Country Championships were the second annual cross country meet to determine the team and individual national champions of men's collegiate cross country running in the United States.

Since the current multi-division format for NCAA championship did not begin until 1973, all NCAA members were eligible. In total, 19 teams and 67 individual runners contested this championship.

The meet was hosted by Michigan State College at the Forest Akers East Golf Course in East Lansing, Michigan for the second consecutive time. Additionally, the distance for the race was 4 miles (6.4 kilometers).

The team national championship was won by the Michigan State Spartans, their first, while the individual championship was won by Walter Mehl from Wisconsin, with a time of 20:30.9.

== Men's title ==
- Distance: 4 miles

=== Team result ===
Rank	Team	Points
1st place, gold medalist(s)	Michigan State	51
2nd place, silver medalist(s)	Wisconsin	57
3rd place, bronze medalist(s)	Indiana	84
4	Drake	104
5	Oklahoma A&M	114
6	Michigan State Normal	129
7	Alfred	138
8	Notre Dame	217
9	Ohio State	227
