= 1941 NCAA cross country championships =

1941 cross-country running meet of the NCAA

1941 NCAA Cross Country Championships
- Organisers: NCAA
- Edition: 4th
- Date: November 24, 1941
- Host city: East Lansing, MI; Michigan State College
- Venue: Forest Akers East Golf Course
- Distances: 4 miles (6.4 km)
- Participation: 94 athletes

The 1941 NCAA Cross Country Championships were the fourth annual cross country meet to determine the team and individual national champions of men's collegiate cross country running in the United States.

Since the current multi-division format for NCAA championship did not begin until 1973, all NCAA members were eligible. In total, 19 teams and 94 individual runners contested this championship.

The meet was hosted by Michigan State College at the Forest Akers East Golf Course in East Lansing, Michigan for the fourth consecutive time. Additionally, the distance for the race was 4 miles (6.4 kilometers).

The team national championship was won by the Rhode Island State Rams, their first, while the individual championship was won by Fred Wilt, from Indiana, with a time of 20:32.1.

== Men's title ==
- Distance: 4 miles

=== Team result ===
Rank	Team	Points
1st place, gold medalist(s)	Rhode Island State	83
2nd place, silver medalist(s)	Penn State	110
3rd place, bronze medalist(s)	Connecticut	114
4	Purdue	120
5	Michigan State College	122
6	Notre Dame	137
7	Michigan State Normal	166
7	Miami (OH)	166
9	Indiana	177
10	Illinois	288
