= 1987 NCAA Division I cross country championships =

1987 cross-country running meet of the NCAA (Division I)

1987 NCAA Division I Cross Country Championships
- Organisers: NCAA
- Edition: 49th (Men); 7th (Women)
- Date: November 23, 1987
- Host city: Charlottesville, Virginia; University of Virginia
- Venue: Foxfield Course
- Distances: 10 km–Men; 5 km–Women
- Participation: 180–Men; 134–Women; 314–Total athletes

The 1987 NCAA Division I Cross Country Championships were the 49th annual NCAA Men's Division I Cross Country Championship and the 7th annual NCAA Women's Division I Cross Country Championship to determine the team and individual national champions of NCAA Division I men's and women's collegiate cross country running in the United States. In all, four different titles were contested: men's and women's individual and team championships.

Held on November 23, 1987, the combined meet was hosted by the University of Virginia at the Foxfield Course in Charlottesville, Virginia. The distance for the men's race was 10 kilometers (6.21 miles) while the distance for the women's race was 5 kilometers (3.11 miles).

The men's team national championship was won by Arkansas, their third national title. The individual championship was won by Joe Falcon, also from Arkansas, with a time of 29:14.97.

The women's team national championship was won by Oregon, their second national title. The individual championship was won by Kimberly Betz, from Indiana, with a then-event record time of 16:10.85.

== Qualification ==
- All Division I cross country teams were eligible to qualify for the meet through their placement at various regional qualifying meets. In total, 22 teams and 180 runners contested the men's championship while 16 teams and 134 runners contested the women's title.

== Men's title ==
- Distance: 10,000 meters (6.21 miles)

=== Men's Team Result (Top 10) ===
Rank	Team	Points	Avg. Time
1st place, gold medalist(s)	Arkansas	87	29:51
2nd place, silver medalist(s)	Dartmouth	119	30:05
3rd place, bronze medalist(s)	Wisconsin	120	30:05
4	Virginia Tech	184	30:08
5	NC State	234	30:33
6	Arizona	244	30:37
7	Notre Dame	259	30:36
8	Northern Arizona	264	30:43
9	Brown	266	30:38
10	Indiana	273	30:43

=== Men's Individual Result (Top 10) ===
Rank	Name	Team	Time
1st place, gold medalist(s)	(United States) Joe Falcon	Arkansas	29:14.97
2nd place, silver medalist(s)	(United States) John Scherer	Michigan	29:20.56
3rd place, bronze medalist(s)	(United States) Harry Green	Texas	29:21.16
4	(United States) Eric Carter	Penn State	29:21.38
5	(United States) Scott Fry	Wisconsin	29:23.26
6	(United States) Dan Garrett	Notre Dame	29:24.94
7	(United States) Chris Zinn	Arkansas	29:28.44
8	(Kenya) Barnaba Korir	Iowa State	29:30.89
9	(United States) Steve Taylor	Virginia Tech	29:31.09
10	(United States) Chris Schille	Brown	29:32.19

== Women's title ==
- Distance: 5,000 meters (3.11 miles)

=== Women's Team Result (Top 10) ===
Rank	Team	Points
1st place, gold medalist(s)	Oregon	98
2nd place, silver medalist(s)	NC State	101
3rd place, bronze medalist(s)	Yale	116
4	Texas	143
5	UTEP	150
6	Wisconsin	155
7	Alabama	163
8	UC Irvine	216
9	Arkansas	222
10	Wake Forest	227

=== Women's Individual Result (Top 10) ===
Rank	Name	Team	Time
1st place, gold medalist(s)	(United States) Kimberly Betz	Indiana	16:10.85
2nd place, silver medalist(s)	(United States) Jackie Goodman	Oklahoma State	16:15.55
3rd place, bronze medalist(s)	(United States) Suzie Tuffey	NC State	16:17.36
4	(Sweden) Kristina Ljunberg	UTEP	16:17.73
5	(United States) Anette Hand	Oregon	16:18.50
6	(United States) Janet Smith	NC State	16:19.88
7	(United States) Renee Harbaugh	NC State	16:20.33
8	(United States) Rita Delnoye	UTEP	16:21.38
9	(United States) Vicki Huber	Villanova	16:22.93
10	(United States) Trina Leopold	Texas	16:23.93

== See also ==
- NCAA Men's Cross Country Championships (Division II, Division III)
- NCAA Women's Cross Country Championships (Division II, Division III)
