= 1948 NCAA cross country championships =

1948 cross-country running meet of the NCAA

1948 NCAA Cross Country Championships
- Organisers: NCAA
- Edition: 10th
- Date: November 22, 1948
- Host city: East Lansing, MI; Michigan State College
- Venue: Forest Akers East Golf Course
- Distances: 4 miles (6.4 km)
- Participation: 131 athletes

The 1948 NCAA Cross Country Championships were the tenth annual cross country meet to determine the team and individual national champions of men's collegiate cross country running in the United States.

Since the current multi-division format for NCAA championship did not begin until 1973, all NCAA members were eligible. In total, 18 teams and 131 individual runners contested this championship.

The meet was hosted by Michigan State College on November 22, 1948, at the Forest Akers East Golf Course in East Lansing, Michigan. The distance for the race was 4 miles (6.4 kilometers).

The team national championship was won by the host Michigan State Spartans, their second overall. The individual championship was won by Robert Black, from Rhode Island State, with a time of 19:52.84, a new distance record. Black's four mile time, which replaced Greg Rice's 1938 time of 20:12.9, would remain in place until 1953.

== Men's title ==
- Distance: 4 miles (6.4 kilometers)

=== Team Result (Top 10) ===
| Rank | Team | Points |
|---|---|---|
| 1st place, gold medalist(s) | Michigan State College | 41 |
| 2nd place, silver medalist(s) | Wisconsin | 69 |
| 3rd place, bronze medalist(s) | Syracuse | 93 |
| 4 | Penn State | 118 |
| 5 | Notre Dame | 164 |
| 6 | Purdue | 165 |
| 7 | Kansas | 213 |
| 8 | Indiana | 224 |
| 9 | Miami (OH) | 245 |
| 10 | Cornell College (IA) | 316 |
