= 1954 NCAA cross country championships =

1954 cross-country running meet of the NCAA

1954 NCAA Cross Country Championships
- Organisers: NCAA
- Edition: 16th
- Date: November 22, 1954
- Host city: East Lansing, MI; Michigan State College
- Venue: Forest Akers East Golf Course
- Distances: 4 miles (6.4 km)
- Participation: 113 athletes

The 1954 NCAA Cross Country Championships were the 16th annual cross country meet to determine the team and individual national champions of men's collegiate cross country running in the United States. Held on November 22, 1954, the meet was hosted by Michigan State College at the Forest Akers East Golf Course in East Lansing, Michigan. The distance for the race was 4 miles (6.4 kilometers).

Since the current multi-division format for NCAA championship did not begin until 1973, all NCAA members were eligible. In total, 14 teams and 113 individual runners contested this championship.

The team national championship was won by the Oklahoma A&M Cowboys, their first. The individual championship was won by Allen Frame, from Kansas, with a time of 19:54.20.

== Men's title ==
- Distance: 4 miles (6.4 kilometers)

=== Team Result (Top 10) ===
Rank	Team	Points
1st place, gold medalist(s)	Oklahoma A&M	60
2nd place, silver medalist(s)	Syracuse	111
3rd place, bronze medalist(s)	Miami (OH)	113
4	Kansas	122
5	Penn State	146
6	Notre Dame	160
7	Pittsburgh	168
8	Maryland	173
9	South Dakota State	203
10	Michigan State College	211
