= 1955 NCAA cross country championships =

1955 cross-country running meet of the NCAA

1955 NCAA Cross Country Championships
- Organisers: NCAA
- Edition: 17th
- Date: November 28, 1955
- Host city: East Lansing, MI; Michigan State University
- Venue: Forest Akers East Golf Course
- Distances: 4 miles (6.4 km)
- Participation: 60 athletes

The 1955 NCAA Cross Country Championships were the 17th annual cross country meet to determine the team and individual national champions of men's collegiate cross country running in the United States. Held on November 28, 1955, the meet was hosted by the newly renamed Michigan State University at the Forest Akers East Golf Course in East Lansing, Michigan. The distance for the race was 4 miles (6.4 kilometers).

Since the current multi-division format for NCAA championship did not begin until 1973, all NCAA members were eligible. In total, 5 teams and 60 individual runners contested this championship.

The team national championship was won by the Michigan State Spartans, their fourth. The individual championship was won by Charles Jones, from Iowa, with a time of 19:57.4.

== Men's title ==
- Distance: 4 miles (6.4 kilometers)

=== Team result ===
Rank	Team	Points
1st place, gold medalist(s)	Michigan State	46
2nd place, silver medalist(s)	Kansas	68
3rd place, bronze medalist(s)	NYU; Notre Dame	95
4	St. Joseph's	115
5	Indiana	142
6	Miami (OH)	151
7	Western Michigan	197
8	Oberlin	216
