= 1944 NCAA cross country championships =

1944 cross-country running meet of the NCAA

1944 NCAA Cross Country Championships
- Organisers: NCAA
- Edition: 6th
- Date: November 25, 1944
- Host city: East Lansing, MI; Michigan State University
- Venue: Forest Akers East Golf Course
- Distances: 4 miles (6.4 km)
- Participation: 43 athletes

The 1944 NCAA Cross Country Championships were the sixth annual cross country meet to determine the team and individual national champions of men's collegiate cross country running in the United States.

Since the current multi-division format for NCAA championship did not begin until 1973, all NCAA members were eligible. In total, 9 teams and 43 individual runners contested this championship.

The meet was hosted by Michigan State College at the Forest Akers East Golf Course in East Lansing, Michigan for the sixth consecutive time. Additionally, the distance for the race was 4 miles (6.4 kilometers). This was the first championship since 1942 after the 1943 race was cancelled due to World War II.

The team national championship was won by the Drake Bulldogs, their first. The individual champion was Fred Feiler, also from Drake, with a time of 21:04.2.

== Men's title ==
- Distance: 4 miles (6.4 kilometers)

=== Team result ===
Rank	Team	Points
1st place, gold medalist(s)	Drake	25
2nd place, silver medalist(s)	Notre Dame	64
3rd place, bronze medalist(s)	Ohio State	72
4	Oberlin College	88
5	Michigan State College	109
6	Wayne	167
