= 1942 NCAA cross country championships =

1942 cross-country running meet of the NCAA

1942 NCAA Cross Country Championships
- Organisers: NCAA
- Edition: 5th
- Date: November 21, 1942
- Host city: East Lansing, MI; Michigan State College
- Venue: Forest Akers East Golf Course
- Distances: 4 miles (6.4 km)
- Participation: 63 athletes

The 1942 NCAA Cross Country Championships were the fifth annual cross country meet to determine the team and individual national champions of men's collegiate cross country running in the United States.

Since the current multi-division format for NCAA championship did not begin until 1973, all NCAA members were eligible. In total, 16 teams and 63 individual runners contested this championship.

The meet was hosted by Michigan State College at the Forest Akers East Golf Course in East Lansing, Michigan for the fifth consecutive time. Additionally, the distance for the race was 4 miles (6.4 kilometers). The following year in 1943 the race was cancelled due to World War II.

The team national championship was won by both Indiana and Penn State (the third for the Hoosiers and the first for the Nittany Lions) in a tie. The individual champion was Oliver Hunter, from Notre Dame, with a time of 20:18.0.

== Men's title ==
- Distance: 4 miles

=== Team result ===
Rank	Team	Points
1st place, gold medalist(s)	Indiana; Penn State	57
2nd place, silver medalist(s)	Rhode Island State	79
3rd place, bronze medalist(s)	Michigan State College	108
4	Illinois	134
5	Notre Dame	145
6	Miami (OH)	154
7	Purdue	160
8	Cornell College	216
