= 1945 NCAA cross country championships =

1945 cross-country running meet of the NCAA

1945 NCAA Cross Country Championships
- Organisers: NCAA
- Edition: 7th
- Date: November 24, 1945
- Host city: East Lansing, MI; Michigan State College
- Venue: Forest Akers East Golf Course
- Distances: 4 miles (6.4 km)
- Participation: 72 athletes

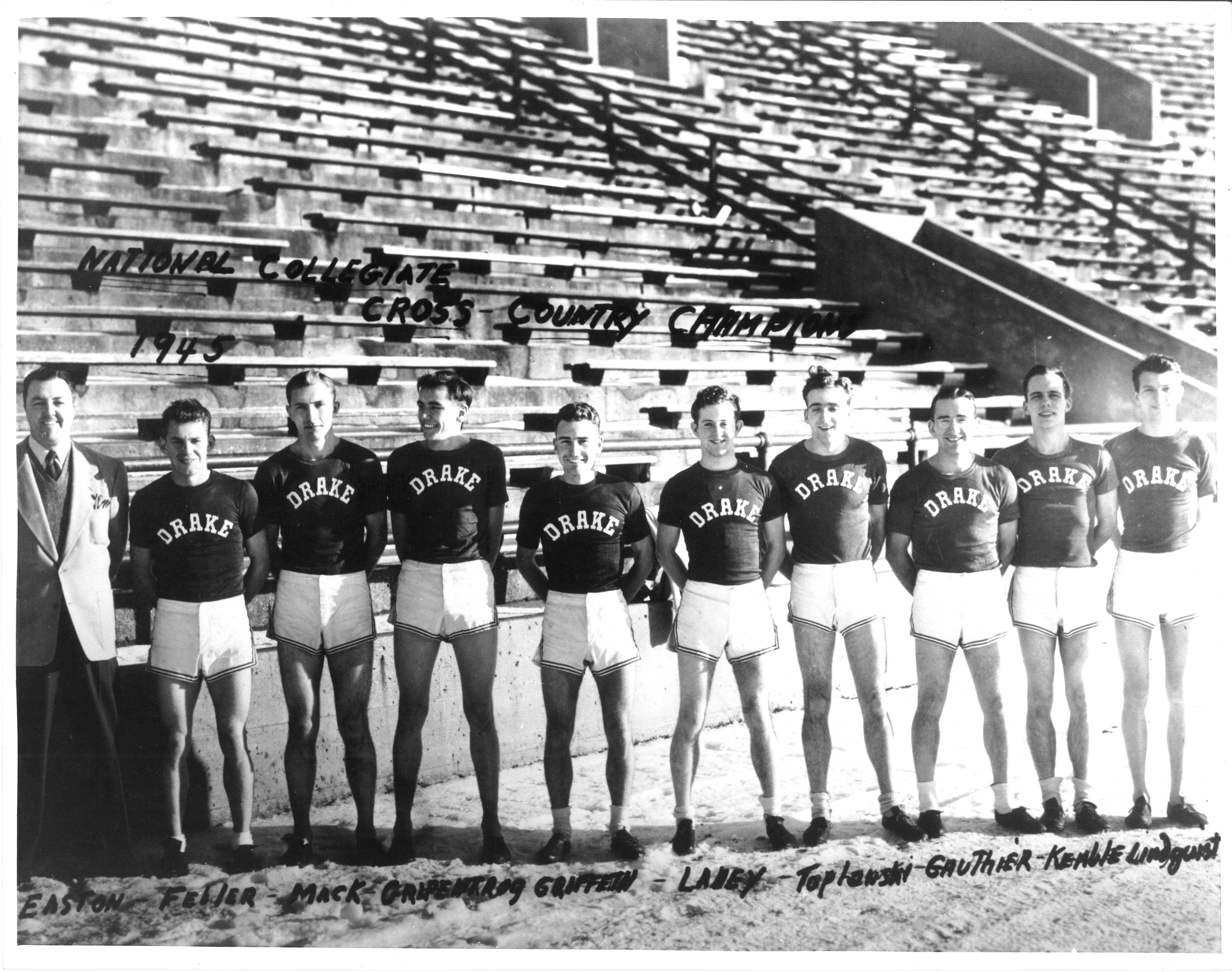
The 1945 Drake University National Championship Cross Country Team

The 1945 NCAA Cross Country Championships were the seventh annual cross country meet to determine the team and individual national champions of men's collegiate cross country running in the United States.

Since the current multi-division format for NCAA championship did not begin until 1973, all NCAA members were eligible. In total, 19 teams and 72 individual runners contested this championship.

The meet was hosted by Michigan State College at the Forest Akers East Golf Course in East Lansing, Michigan for the seventh consecutive time. Additionally, the distance for the race was 4 miles (6.4 kilometers).

The team national championship was retained by the Drake Bulldogs, their second overall. The individual championship was also retained by Fred Feiler from Drake with a time of 21:14.2.

== Men's title ==
- Distance: 4 miles (6.4 kilometers)

=== Team result ===
Rank	Team	Points
1st place, gold medalist(s)	Drake	50
2nd place, silver medalist(s)	Notre Dame	65
3rd place, bronze medalist(s)	Wisconsin	84
4	Miami (OH)	89
5	Ohio State	113
6	Michigan State College	149
7	Kansas	179
8	Wayne	197
