= 1946 NCAA cross country championships =

1946 cross-country running meet of the NCAA

1946 NCAA Cross Country Championships
- Organisers: NCAA
- Edition: 8th
- Date: November 25, 1946
- Host city: East Lansing, MI; Michigan State College
- Venue: Forest Akers East Golf Course
- Distances: 4 miles (6.4 km)
- Participation: 147 athletes

The 1946 NCAA Cross Country Championships were the eighth annual cross country meet to determine the team and individual national champions of men's collegiate cross country running in the United States.

Since the current multi-division format for NCAA championship did not begin until 1973, all NCAA members were eligible. In total, 28 teams contested this championship.

The meet was hosted by Michigan State College at the Forest Akers East Golf Course in East Lansing, Michigan for the eighth consecutive time. Additionally, the distance for the race was 4 miles (6.4 kilometers).

The team national championship was retained again by the Drake Bulldogs, their third overall. The individual championship was won by Quentin Brelsford, from Ohio Wesleyan, with a time of 20:22.9.

== Men's title ==
- Distance: 4 miles (6.4 kilometers)

=== Team Result (top 10) ===
Rank	Team	Points
1st place, gold medalist(s)	Drake	42
2nd place, silver medalist(s)	NYU	98
3rd place, bronze medalist(s)	Penn State	114
4	Miami (OH)	139
5	Wisconsin	161
6	Michigan State College	187
7	Indiana	197
8	Syracuse	212
9	Oklahoma	264
10	Notre Dame	270
