= 1957 NCAA cross country championships =

1957 cross-country running meet of the NCAA

1957 NCAA Cross Country Championships
- Organisers: NCAA
- Edition: 19th
- Date: November 25, 1957
- Host city: East Lansing, MI; Michigan State University
- Venue: Forest Akers East Golf Course
- Distances: 4 miles (6.4 km)
- Participation: 124 athletes

The 1957 NCAA Cross Country Championships were the 19th annual cross country meet to determine the team and individual national champions of men's collegiate cross country running in the United States. Held on November 25, 1957, the meet was hosted by Michigan State University at the Forest Akers East Golf Course in East Lansing, Michigan. The distance for the race was 4 miles (6.4 kilometers).

With the NCAA establishing a College Division championship the following year in 1958, this was the final NCAA cross country championship for which all NCAA members were eligible. In total, 17 teams and 124 individual runners contested this championship.

The team national championship was won by the Notre Dame Fighting Irish, their first. The individual championship was won by Max Truex, from USC, with a record time of 19:12.30. Truex's event distance record would remain in place until the distance for the championship race was changed to 6 miles in 1965.

== Men's title ==
- Distance: 4 miles (6.4 kilometers)

=== Team Result (Top 10) ===
Rank	Team	Points
1st place, gold medalist(s)	Notre Dame	121
2nd place, silver medalist(s)	Michigan State	127
3rd place, bronze medalist(s)	Houston	131
4	Syracuse	140
5	Kansas	158
6	Western Michigan	168
7	Cornell	172
8	Colorado	198
9	Penn State	206
10	Miami (OH)	215
