= 1947 NCAA cross country championships =

1947 cross-country running meet of the NCAA

1947 NCAA Cross Country Championships
- Organisers: NCAA
- Edition: 9th
- Date: November 24, 1947
- Host city: East Lansing, MI; Michigan State College
- Venue: Forest Akers East Golf Course
- Distances: 4 miles (6.4 km)
- Participation: 151 athletes

The 1947 NCAA Cross Country Championships were the ninth annual cross country meet to determine the team and individual national champions of men's collegiate cross country running in the United States.

Since the current multi-division format for NCAA championship did not begin until 1973, all NCAA members were eligible. In total, 19 teams and 151 individual runners contested this championship.

The meet was hosted by Michigan State College at the Forest Akers East Golf Course in East Lansing, Michigan for the ninth consecutive time. Additionally, the distance for the race was 4 miles (6.4 kilometers).

The team national championship was won by the Penn State Nittany Lions, their first overall. The individual championship was won by Jack Milne, from North Carolina, with a time of 20:41.1.

== Men's title ==
- Distance: 4 miles (6.4 kilometers)

=== Team Result (Top 10) ===
Rank	Team	Points
1st place, gold medalist(s)	Penn State	60
2nd place, silver medalist(s)	Syracuse	72
3rd place, bronze medalist(s)	Drake	133
4	Purdue	144
5	Indiana	147
6	Michigan State College	152
7	Miami (OH)	172
8	Wisconsin	197
9	Notre Dame	216
10	Ohio Wesleyan	272
