= 1949 NCAA cross country championships =

1949 cross-country running meet of the NCAA

1949 NCAA Cross Country Championships
- Organisers: NCAA
- Edition: 11th
- Date: November 28, 1949
- Host city: East Lansing, MI; Michigan State College
- Venue: Forest Akers East Golf Course
- Distances: 4 miles (6.4 km)
- Participation: 131 athletes

The 1949 NCAA Cross Country Championships were the 11th annual cross country meet to determine the team and individual national champions of men's collegiate cross country running in the United States.

Since the current multi-division format for NCAA championship did not begin until 1973, all NCAA members were eligible. In total, 18 teams and 131 individual runners contested this championship.

The meet was hosted by Michigan State College on November 28, 1949, at the Forest Akers East Golf Course in East Lansing, Michigan. The distance for the race was 4 miles (6.4 kilometers).

The team national championship was retained by the host Michigan State Spartans, their third. The individual championship was retained by Robert Black, from Rhode Island, with a time of 20:25.94 after setting the distance record the previous year.

== Men's title ==
- Distance: 4 miles (6.4 kilometers)

=== Team Result (Top 10) ===
Rank	Team	Points
1st place, gold medalist(s)	Michigan State College	59
2nd place, silver medalist(s)	Syracuse	81
3rd place, bronze medalist(s)	Manhattan	86
4	Penn State	93
5	Army	133
6	Kansas	147
7	Wisconsin	207
8	Illinois	244
9	Purdue	255
10	Notre Dame	265
