= 1938 NCAA cross country championships =

1938 cross-country running meet of the NCAA

1938 NCAA Cross Country Championships
- Organisers: NCAA
- Edition: 1st
- Date: November 21, 1938
- Host city: East Lansing, MI; Michigan State College
- Venue: Forest Akers East Golf Course
- Distances: 4 miles (6.4 km)
- Participation: 50 athletes

The 1938 NCAA Cross Country Championship was the first annual cross country meet to determine the team and individual national champions of men's collegiate cross country running in the United States. Prior to 1938, the national championship for collegiate cross country was organized, first, by the Inter-Collegiate Cross Country Association (1899 to 1907) and, second, the Inter-Collegiate Association of Amateur Athletes of America (1907 to 1939).

Since the current multi-division format for NCAA championships did not begin until 1973, all NCAA members were eligible. In total, 12 teams and 50 individual runners contested this championship.

The meet was hosted by Michigan State College at the Forest Akers East Golf Course in East Lansing, Michigan. Additionally, the distance for the race was 4 miles (6.4 kilometers).

The inaugural team national championship was won by the Indiana Hoosiers while the individual championship was won by Greg Rice, from Notre Dame, with a time of 20:12.9. This time would remain the NCAA championship record until 1948.

== Men's title ==
- Distance: 4 miles
- (H) = Hosts

=== Team result ===
Rank	Team	Points
1st place, gold medalist(s)	Indiana	51
2nd place, silver medalist(s)	Notre Dame	61
3rd place, bronze medalist(s)	Drake	68
4	Michigan State (H)	70
5	Alfred	103
6	Purdue	133

== See also ==
- List of pre-NCAA collegiate cross country champions
