= 1956 NCAA cross country championships =

1956 cross-country running meet of the NCAA

1956 NCAA Cross Country Championships
- Organisers: NCAA
- Edition: 18th
- Date: November 26, 1956
- Host city: East Lansing, MI; Michigan State College
- Venue: Forest Akers East Golf Course
- Distances: 4 miles (6.4 km)
- Participation: 115 athletes

The 1956 NCAA Cross Country Championships were contested at the 18th annual NCAA-sanctioned cross country meet to determine the team and individual national champions of men's collegiate cross country running in the United States. Held on November 26, 1956, the meet was hosted by Michigan State College at the Forest Akers East Golf Course in East Lansing, Michigan. The distance for the race was 4 miles (6.4 kilometers).

Since the current multi-division format for NCAA championship did not begin until 1973, all NCAA members were eligible. In total, 14 teams and 115 individual runners contested this championship.

The team national championship was won by the Michigan State Spartans, their fifth and second consecutive. The individual championship was won by Walter McNew, from Texas, with a time of 19:55.94.

== Men's title ==
- Distance: 4 miles (6.4 kilometers)

=== Team Result (Top 10) ===
Rank	Team	Points
1st place, gold medalist(s)	Michigan State	28
2nd place, silver medalist(s)	Kansas	88
3rd place, bronze medalist(s)	Texas	89
4	Illinois	128
5	Saint Joseph's	166
6	Notre Dame	175
7	Penn State	192
8	Indiana	200
9	Miami (OH)	219
10	Connecticut	228
