= 1951 NCAA cross country championships =

1951 cross-country running meet of the NCAA

1951 NCAA Cross Country Championships
- Organisers: NCAA
- Edition: 13th
- Date: November 26, 1951
- Host city: East Lansing, MI; Michigan State College
- Venue: Forest Akers East Golf Course
- Distances: 4 miles (6.4 km)
- Participation: 122 athletes

The 1951 NCAA Cross Country Championships were the 13th annual cross country meet to determine the team and individual national champions of men's collegiate cross country running in the United States.

Since the current multi-division format for NCAA championship did not begin until 1973, all NCAA members were eligible. In total, 23 teams and 122 individual runners contested this championship.

The meet was hosted by Michigan State College on November 26, 1951, at the Forest Akers East Golf Course in East Lansing, Michigan. The distance for the race was 4 miles (6.4 kilometers).

The team national championship was won by the Syracuse Orangemen, their first. The individual championship was retained by Herb Semper, from Kansas, with a time of 20:09.74.

== Men's title ==
- Distance: 4 miles (6.4 kilometers)

=== Team Result (Top 10) ===
Rank	Team	Points
1st place, gold medalist(s)	Syracuse	80
2nd place, silver medalist(s)	Kansas	118
3rd place, bronze medalist(s)	Wisconsin	120
4	Penn State	122
5	Michigan State College	150
6	Tennessee	195
7	Indiana	204
8	Drake	207
9	Miami (OH)	219
10	Pittsburgh	222
