= Air Force Falcons men's cross country =

- University: United States Air Force Academy
- Head coach: Laura Bowerman (3rd season)
- Conference: MW
- Location: Air Force Academy, CO
- Nickname: Falcons
- Colors: Blue and silver

NCAA Championship appearances
- 1959, 1960, 1961, 1964, 1967, 1968, 1971, 1981, 1991, 2000, 2001, 2003, 2004, 2013, 2017, 2018, 2020, 2021, 2022, 2023

Conference champions
- 1991, 1994, 1996, 2003, 2015, 2020, 2021, 2022

Air Force Falcons men's cross country is one of the cross country teams of the United States Air Force Academy in Air Force Academy, Colorado.The Falcons compete in the Mountain West Conference at the Division I level in the NCAA and are coached by Laura Bowerman.

== Championship Results ==
Year	Coach	Place	Points
2023	Laura Bowerman	12th	368
2022	Laura Bowerman	7th	264
2021	Ryan Cole	17th	453
2020*	Ryan Cole	19th	464
2018	Ryan Cole	20th	498
2017	Ryan Cole	15th	429
2013	Juli Benson	20th	419
2004	Mark Stanforth	14th	382
2003	Mark Stanforth	8th	327
2001	Mark Stanforth	26th	620
2000	Mark Stanforth	16th	467
1991	Ralph Linderman	14th	318
1981	Maj. Pete Jones	22nd	457
1971	Arne Arnesen	23rd	529
1968	Arne Arnesen	22nd	506
1967	Arne Arnesen	2nd	96
1964	Arne Arnesen	10th	288
1961	Capt. Ed Matthews	10th	244
1960	Capt. Ed Matthews	7th	181
1959	Capt. Ed Matthews	9th	188

== Coaches ==
Coach	Tenure
Laura Bowerman	2022-Present
Ryan Cole	2014-2022
Juli Benson	2009-2014
Ralph Linderman	2008-2009
John Hayes	2007-2008
Mark Stanforth	1992-2007
Ralph Linderman	1989-1992
Maj. Jim Trego	1983-1989
Maj. Pete Jones	1981-1983
Maj. Dick Elliot	1977-1981
Arne Arnesen	1962-1977
Capt. Ed Matthews	1958-1962
Tommy Thomson	1957-1958
1Lt. Russell Thoburn	1956-1957
