= 1960 NCAA University Division cross country championships =

1960 cross-country running meet of the NCAA (University Division)

1960 NCAA University Division Cross Country Championships
- Organisers: NCAA
- Edition: 22nd
- Date: November 21, 1960
- Host city: East Lansing, MI; Michigan State University
- Venue: Forest Akers East Golf Course
- Distances: 4 miles (6.4 km)
- Participation: 99 athletes

The 1960 NCAA University Divisions Cross Country Championships were the 22nd annual cross country meet to determine the team and individual national champions of men's collegiate cross country running in the United States. Held on November 21, 1960, the meet was hosted by Michigan State University at the Forest Akers East Golf Course in East Lansing, Michigan. The distance for the race was 4 miles (6.4 kilometers).

All NCAA University Division members were eligible to qualify for the meet. In total, 12 teams and 99 individual runners contested this championship.

The team national championship was won by the Houston Cougars, their first. The individual championship was retained by Al Lawrence, also from Houston, with a time of 19:28.44.

== Men's title ==
- Distance: 4 miles (6.4 kilometers)

=== Team result ===
Rank	Team	Points
1st place, gold medalist(s)	Houston	54
2nd place, silver medalist(s)	Michigan State	80
3rd place, bronze medalist(s)	Western Michigan	84
4	Penn State	104
5	Colorado State	118
6	Army	173
7	Air Force	181
8	Iowa	182
9	Miami (OH)	233
10	Notre Dame	252
11	Alfred	260
12	Texas	275

== See also ==
- NCAA Men's Division II Cross Country Championship
