= 1958 NCAA University Division cross country championships =

1958 cross-country running meet of the NCAA (University Division)

1958 NCAA University Division Cross Country Championships
- Organisers: NCAA
- Edition: 20th
- Date: November 24, 1958
- Host city: East Lansing, MI; Michigan State University
- Venue: Forest Akers East Golf Course
- Distances: 4 miles (6.4 km)
- Participation: 106 athletes

The 1958 NCAA University Division Cross Country Championships were the 20th annual cross country meet to determine the team and individual national champions of men's collegiate cross country running in the United States. It was the first championship held exclusively for University Division (future Division I) teams; all small college teams were shifted to the established NCAA Men's College Division Cross Country Championship (later re-designated as Division II).

Held on November 24, 1958, the meet was hosted by Michigan State University at the Forest Akers East Golf Course in East Lansing, Michigan. The distance for the race was 4 miles (6.4 kilometers).

Following the creation of the NCAA"s multi-division structure this year, only NCAA University Division teams, and their respective runners, were eligible. In total, 14 teams and 106 individual runners contested this championship.

The team national championship was won by the Michigan State Spartans, their seventh. The individual championship was won by Crawford Kennedy, also from Michigan State, with a time of 20:07.1.

== Men's title ==
- Distance: 4 miles (6.4 kilometers)

=== Team result ===
Rank	Team	Points
1st place, gold medalist(s)	Michigan State	79
2nd place, silver medalist(s)	Western Michigan	104
3rd place, bronze medalist(s)	Army	111
4	Notre Dame	114
5	Iowa State	126
6	Kansas	144
7	Indiana	173
8	Iowa	202
9	Arkansas	239
10	Central Michigan	240
11	Drake	254
12	Syracuse	259
13	Duke	307
14	Miami (OH)	316

== See also ==
- NCAA Men's College Division Cross Country Championship
