= 1961 NCAA University Division cross country championships =

1961 cross-country running meet of the NCAA (University Division)

1961 NCAA University Division Cross Country Championships
- Organisers: NCAA
- Edition: 23rd
- Date: November 27, 1961
- Host city: East Lansing, MI; Michigan State University
- Venue: Forest Akers East Golf Course
- Distances: 4 miles (6.4 km)
- Participation: 134 athletes

The 1961 NCAA University Division Cross Country Championships were the 23rd annual cross country meet to determine the team and individual national champions of men's collegiate cross country running in the United States. Held on November 27, 1961, the meet was hosted by Michigan State University at the Forest Akers East Golf Course in East Lansing, Michigan. The distance for the race was 4 miles (6.4 kilometers).

All NCAA University Division members were eligible to qualify for the meet. In total, 17 teams and 134 individual runners contested this championship.

The team national championship was won by the Oregon State Beavers, their first. The individual championship was won by Dale Story, also from Oregon State, with a time of 19:46.84.

== Men's title ==
- Distance: 4 miles (6.4 kilometers)

=== Team Result (Top 10) ===
Rank	Team	Points
1st place, gold medalist(s)	Oregon State	68
2nd place, silver medalist(s)	San José State	82
3rd place, bronze medalist(s)	Houston	122
4	Kansas	124
5	Iowa	164
6	Western Michigan	165
7	Southern Illinois	172
8	Penn State	203
9	Michigan State	212
10	Air Force	244

== See also ==
- NCAA Men's College Division Cross Country Championship
