= 1959 NCAA University Division cross country championships =

1959 cross-country running meet of the NCAA (University Division)

1959 NCAA University Division Cross Country Championships
- Organisers: NCAA
- Edition: 21st
- Date: November 23, 1959
- Host city: East Lansing, MI; Michigan State University
- Venue: Forest Akers East Golf Course
- Distances: 4 miles (6.4 km)
- Participation: 113 athletes

The 1959 NCAA University Division Cross Country Championships were the 21st annual cross country meet to determine the team and individual national champions of men's collegiate cross country running in the United States. Held on November 23, 1959, the meet was hosted by Michigan State University at the Forest Akers East Golf Course in East Lansing, Michigan. The distance for the race was 4 miles (6.4 kilometers).

All NCAA University Division members were eligible to qualify for the meet. In total, 13 teams and 113 individual runners contested this championship.

The team national championship was won by the Michigan State Spartans, their eighth. The individual championship was won by Al Lawrence, from Houston, with a time of 20:35.94.

== Men's title ==
- Distance: 4 miles (6.4 kilometers)

=== Team result ===
Rank	Team	Points
1st place, gold medalist(s)	Michigan State	44
2nd place, silver medalist(s)	Houston	120
3rd place, bronze medalist(s)	Iowa	134
4	Notre Dame	141
5	Western Michigan	148
6	Iowa State	153
7	Army	160
8	Indiana	185
9	Air Force	188
10	Penn State	213
11	Syracuse	226
12	Alfred	241
13	Miami (OH)	335

== See also ==
- NCAA Men's Division II Cross Country Championship
