= 1952 NCAA cross country championships =

1952 cross-country running meet of the NCAA

1952 NCAA Cross Country Championships
- Organisers: NCAA
- Edition: 14th
- Date: November 24, 1952
- Host city: East Lansing, MI; Michigan State College
- Venue: Forest Akers East Golf Course
- Distances: 4 miles (6.4 km)
- Participation: 97 athletes

The 1952 NCAA Men's Cross Country Championships were the 14th annual cross country meet to determine the team and individual national champions of men's collegiate cross country running in the United States.

Since the current multi-division format for NCAA championship did not begin until 1973, all NCAA members were eligible. In total, 24 teams and 97 individual runners contested this championship.

The meet was hosted by Michigan State College on November 24, 1952, at the Forest Akers East Golf Course in East Lansing, Michigan. The distance for the race was 4 miles (6.4 kilometers).

The team national championship was won by the host Michigan State Spartans, their fourth. The individual championship was won by Charles Capozzoli, from Georgetown, with a time of 19:36.94.

== Men's title ==
- Distance: 4 miles (6.4 kilometers)

=== Team Result (Top 10) ===
| Rank | Team | Points |
|---|---|---|
| 1st place, gold medalist(s) | Michigan State College | 65 |
| 2nd place, silver medalist(s) | Indiana | 68 |
| 3rd place, bronze medalist(s) | Iowa | 103 |
| 4 | Syracuse; Penn State | 110 |
| 5 | Miami (OH) | 145 |
| 6 | San Diego State | 176 |
| 7 | Drake | 186 |
| 8 | Wisconsin | 212 |
| 9 | NC State | 242 |
| 10 | Wheaton (IL) | 259 |
