= 1963 NCAA University Division cross country championships =

1963 cross-country running meet of the NCAA (University Division)

1963 NCAA University Division Cross Country Championships
- Organisers: NCAA
- Edition: 25th
- Date: November 26, 1963
- Host city: East Lansing, MI; Michigan State University
- Venue: Forest Akers East Golf Course
- Distances: 4 miles (6.4 km)
- Participation: 166 athletes

The 1963 NCAA University Division Cross Country Championships were the 25th annual cross country meet to determine the team and individual national champions of men's collegiate cross country running in the United States. Held on November 26, 1963, the meet was hosted by Michigan State University at the Forest Akers East Golf Course in East Lansing, Michigan. The distance for the race was 4 miles (6.4 kilometers).

All NCAA University Division members were eligible to qualify for the meet. In total, 21 teams and 166 individual runners contested this championship.

The team national championship was retained by the San José State Spartans, their second team title. The individual championship was won by Victor Zwolak, from Villanova, with a time of 19:35.00.

== Men's title ==
- Distance: 4 miles (6.4 kilometers)

=== Team Result (Top 10) ===
Rank	Team	Points
1st place, gold medalist(s)	San José State	52
2nd place, silver medalist(s)	Oregon	68
3rd place, bronze medalist(s)	Notre Dame	125
4	Kansas	153
5	Michigan State	171
6	Ohio	187
7	Houston	189
8	Miami (OH)	213
9	Villanova	223
10	Western Michigan	241

== Individual results ==
Place	Name	Team	Time	Points
1	Victor Zwolak	Villanova	19:35.0	1
2	John Camien	Emporia State University	19:38.0	--
3	Jeffrey Fishback	San José State	19:48.5	2
4	Geoff Walker	Houston	19:53.0	3
5	Danny Murphy	San José State	19:56.0	4
6	G. Douglas Brown	Montana State University	19:59.0	--
7	Richard Schramm	Miami	20:04.5	5
8	Ben Tucker	San José State	20:06.4	6
9	Arthur Scott	Idaho State University	20:07.0	--
10	Richard Sharkey	Michigan State	20:08.0	7
11	Clayton Steinke	Oregon	20:09.5	8
12	Walter Hewlett	Harvard University	20:10.0	--
13	Bill Clark	Notre Dame	20:11.0	9
14	Kenny Moore	Oregon	20:14.4	10
15	David Wighton	University of Colorado	20:15.2	--
16	Frank Carver	Notre Dame	20:19.0	11
17	Jack Bacheler	Miami	20:20.4	12
12	Herman Gurule	San José State	20:21.2	13
19	Ralph Lingle	University of Missouri	20:23.0	--
20	William Straub	United States Military Academy	20:25.0	--

== See also ==
- NCAA Men's College Division Cross Country Championship
