= Colorado Buffaloes cross country =

- University: Colorado
- Head coach: Sean Carlson
- Conference: Big 12
- Location: Boulder, Colorado, US
- Nickname: Buffaloes
- Colors: Silver, black, and gold

Men's national championships
- 2001, 2004, 2006, 2013, 2014

Women's national championships
- 2000, 2004, 2018

Men's NCAA appearances
- 1957, 1962, 1965, 1966, 1967, 1968, 1970, 1971, 1973, 1975, 1976, 1977, 1978, 1979, 1980, 1982, 1984, 1985, 1986, 1987, 1989, 1992, 1993, 1994, 1995, 1996, 1997, 1998, 1999, 2000, 2001, 2002, 2003, 2004, 2005, 2006, 2007, 2008, 2009, 2010, 2011, 2012, 2013, 2014, 2015, 2016, 2017, 2018, 2019, 2020, 2021, 2022, 2023, 2024, 2025

Women's NCAA appearances
- 1976, 1977, 1978, 1979, 1980, 1981, 1986, 1987, 1992, 1993, 1994, 1995, 1996, 1997, 1998, 1999, 2000, 2001, 2002, 2003, 2004, 2005, 2006, 2007, 2009, 2010, 2011, 2012, 2013, 2014, 2015, 2016, 2017, 2018, 2019, 2020, 2021, 2022, 2023, 2025

Men's conference champions
- 1962, 1976, 1977, 1978, 1979, 1980, 1982, 1985, 1986, 1992, 1996, 1997, 1998, 1999, 2000, 2001, 2002, 2003, 2004, 2005, 2006, 2007, 2011, 2012, 2013, 2014, 2015, 2016, 2019, 2021, 2026

Women's conference champions
- 1987, 1992, 1994, 1995, 1996, 1997, 1999, 2000, 2001, 2002, 2003, 2004, 2005, 2006, 2007, 2011, 2015, 2016, 2017, 2021, 2022

Colorado Buffaloes cross country represents the University of Colorado and competes in the Big 12 Conference of NCAA Division I. The team was coached by Mark Wetmore for 29 years.

== Coaches ==
Frank Potts 1927–1969

Colorado's outdoor track and field stadium is named after Coach Potts.

Don Meyers 1969–1975

Dean Brittenham 1976–1979

David Troy 1980–1985

Jerry Quiller 1986–1994

Mark Wetmore 1995–2024

Coach Wetmore was the first NCAA division one coach to have won both a men's and women's team national championship along with having a men's and women's individual champion.

Wetmore is known for having the team train on Magnolia Road, otherwise known as "Mags." The road is 13 miles long and the team uses it for their Sunday long runs. Mags has become a tourist attraction for other runners. Wetmore's time as coach was also immortalized in the 2000 book Running With the Buffaloes.

Sean Carlson 2024–

== In the media ==
Chris Lear published Running with the Buffaloes in June 2000. The book gives an inside look into the 1998 Colorado men's cross country team and gained a cult following within the running community.

In 2014 FloSports' running brand FloTrack released a docuseries called The Program: Colorado which followed the men's team on their way to winning the 2014 NCAA Championship.

== Notable athletes ==
Men's individual national championships
Year	Athlete	League
1982	Mark Scrutton	NCAA
1998	Adam Goucher	NCAA
2002	Jorge Torres	NCAA
2003	Dathan Ritzenhein	NCAA

Men's individual conference champions
Year	Athlete	Conference
1964	Dave Wighton	Big 8
1967	Craig Runyan	Big 8
1968	Craig Runyan	Big 8
1976	Kirk Pfeffer	Big 8
1977	Mark Spilsbury	Big 8
1978	Kirk Pfeffer	Big 8
1979	Mark Anderson	Big 8
1980	Mark Scrutton	Big 8
1981	Mark Scrutton	Big 8
1982	Mark Scrutton	Big 8
1986	Chuck Truijillo	Big 8
1997	Adam Goucher	Big 12
1998	Adam Goucher	Big 12
1999	Ryan Roybal	Big 12
2000	Jorge Torres	Big 12
2001	Jorge Torres	Big 12
2002	Jorge Torres	Big 12
2003	Dathan Ritzenhein	Big 12
2007	Brent Vaughn	Big 12
2019	Joe Klecker	Pac-12
2020	Eduardo Herrera	Pac-12

Women's individual national championships
Year	Athlete	League
1978	Mary Decker	AIAW
2000	Kara Grgas-Wheeler	NCAA
2018	Dani Jones	NCAA

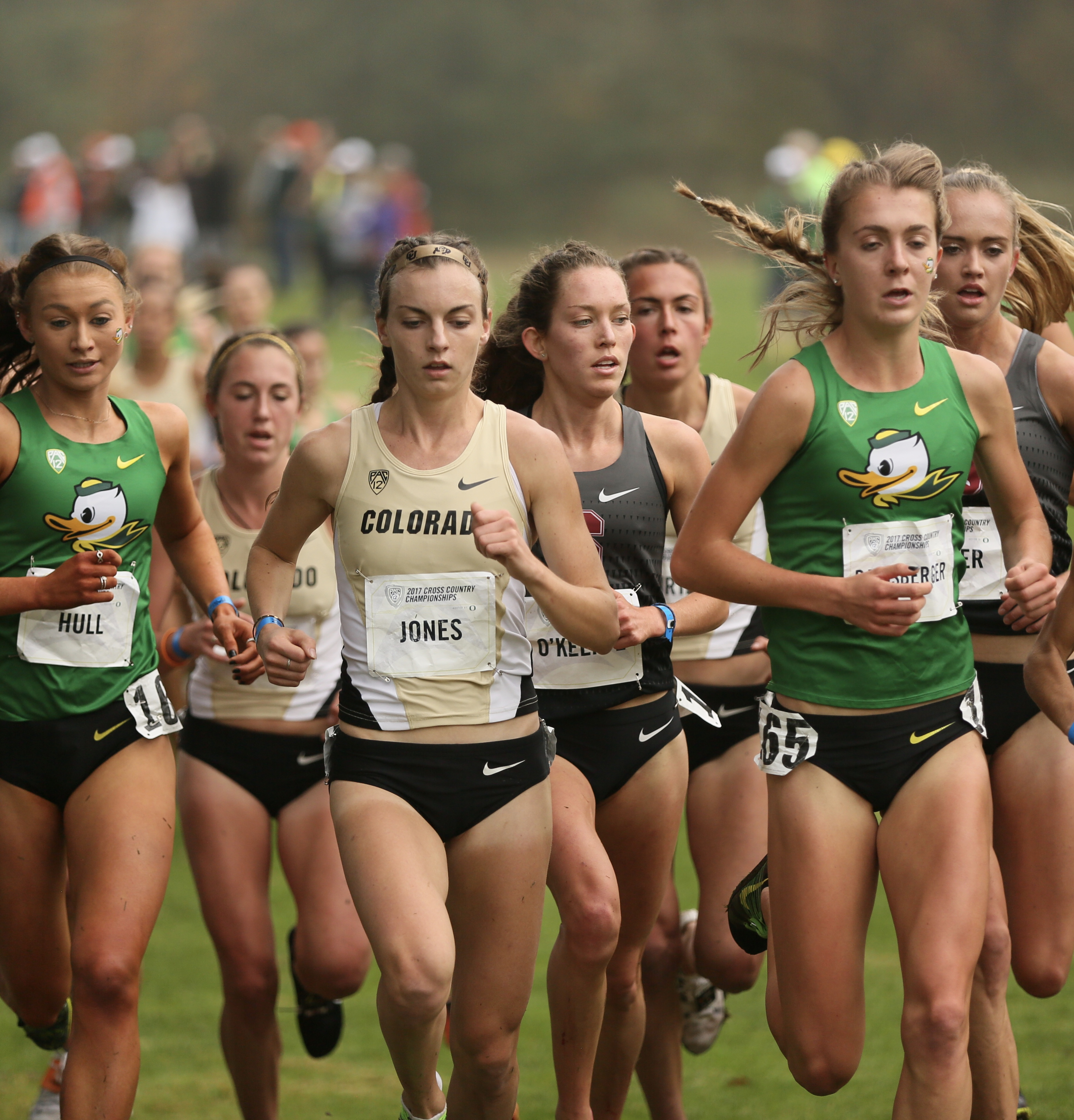
Dani Jones at the 2017 Pac-12 Championship

Women's Individual conference champions
Year	Athlete	Conference
1992	Brooke Baugh	Big 8
1995	Patty Roberts	Big 8
1996	Kelly Smith	Big 12
1999	Kara Wheeler	Big 12
2000	Kara Grgas-Wheeler	Big 12
2001	Molly Austin	Big 12
2002	Molly Austin	Big 12
2003	Natalie Florence	Big 12
2004	Renee Metivier	Big 12
2005	Christine Bolf	Big 12
2009	Jenny Barringer	Big 12
2017	Dani Jones	Pac-12
2018	Dani Jones	Pac-12
2021	Abby Nichols	Pac-12
2022	Bailey Hertenstein	Pac-12

Men's All-Americans

- Dave Wrighton 1963, 1964, 1965
- Craig Runyon 1966, 1967, 1968
- Rick Truijillo 1967
- John Lunn 1968
- John Gregorio 1972, 1973
- Mike Peterson 1974
- Mark Spilsbury 1977, 1979
- John Hunsaker 1978
- Mark Anderson 1979
- Michael Buhmann 1979
- Mark Scrutton 1980, 1981, 1982
- Sam Reese 1982
- Dan Reese 1984, 1985
- Chuck Truijillo 1985, 1986
- Mike Nahom 1989
- Shawn Found 1992
- Alan Culpepper 1993, 1994, 1995
- Scott Larson 1993
- Jay Cleckler 1994
- Jon Cooper 1994, 1995
- Adam Goucher 1994, 1995, 1997, 1998
- Clint Wells 1994, 1995
- Ricky Cron 1996
- Chris Severy 1996
- Zeke Tiernan 1996
- Tom Reese 1997
- Matt Napier 1997
- Adam Batliner 1997
- Mike Friedberg 1998, 1999, 2000
- Ron Roybal 1998
- Jorge Torres 2000, 2001, 2002
- Ed Torres 2000, 2001, 2002
- Sean Smith 2000
- Steve Slattery 2000, 2001
- Dathan Ritzenhein 2001, 2003
- Billy Nelson 2002, 2003
- Bret Schoolmeester 2004, 2005
- Jon Severy 2004
- Brent Vaughn 2004, 2006, 2007
- Stephen Pifer 2004, 2005, 2006, 2007
- James Strang 2005, 2006
- Erik Heinonen 2006
- Jordan Kyle 2008
- Joe Bosshard 2010, 2011
- Andy Wacker 2010, 2011
- Richard Medina 2011
- Jake Hurysz 2012
- Blake Theroux 2012, 2013, 2014
- Aric Van Halen 2012
- Pierce Murphy 2013, 2014, 2015
- Morgan Pearson 2013, 2015
- Ben Saarel 2013, 2014, 2015, 2016
- Ammar Moussa 2014
- Connor Winter 2014, 205
- John Dressel 2015, 2016, 2018, 2019
- Joe Klecker 2016, 2018, 2019
- Eduardo Herrera 2017
- Ryan Forsyth 2018
- Alec Hornecker 2019
- Eduardo Herrera 2021
- Austin Vancil 2022, 2023
- Dean Casey 2024

Women's All-Americans

- Mary Decker (AIAW) 1978
- Carol McMordie 1986
- Chris McNamara 1986, 1987
- Patty Roberts 1994, 1995
- Heather Burroughs 1994, 1995, 1998
- Natalie Raveling 1994
- Colleen Glyde 1995, 1996
- Kelly Smith 1995, 1997
- Carrie Messner 1996
- Kara Grgas-Wheeler 1999, 2000
- Sara (Gorton) Slattery 2000, 2002, 2004
- Jodie Hughes 2000
- Molly Austin 2001, 2002
- Natalie Florence 2002, 2004
- Renee Metivier 2003, 2004
- Kalin Toedebusch 2003
- Christine Bolf 2004, 2005
- Liza Pasciuto 2004, 2005, 2006
- Jenny Barringer 2006, 2007
- Sara Vaughn 2007
- Allie McLaughlin 2009
- Shalaya Kipp 2010, 2011, 2012, 2013
- Laura Tremblay 2010
- Emma Coburn 2011
- Erin Clark 2014, 2015
- Kaitlyn Benner 2015, 2016, 2017
- Mackenzie Caldwell 2016
- Sage Hurta 2016, 2017, 2018, 2019
- Dani Jones 2016, 2017, 2018
- Val Constien 2018
- Makena Morley 2018
- Tabor Scholl 2018
- Tayler Tuttle 2018
- Abby Nichols 2020, 2021
- Emily Covert 2021
- Bailey Hertenstein, 2022
- Ella Baran, 2022

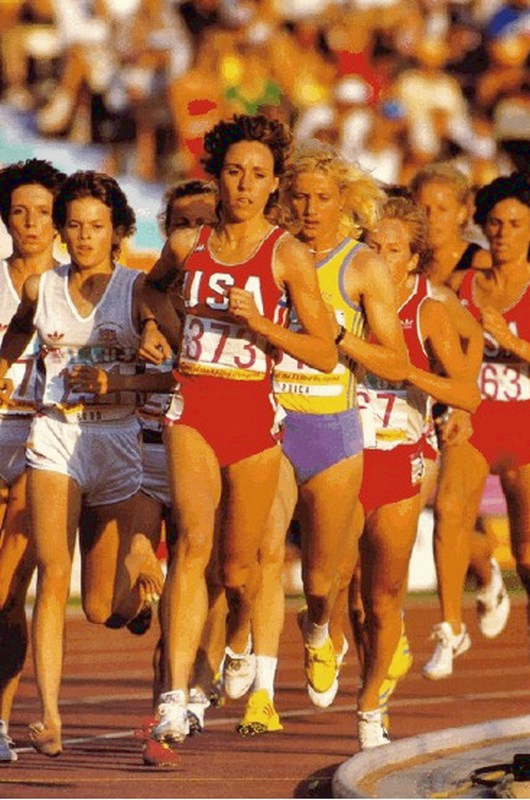
Mary Decker in the 1984 Olympic Games

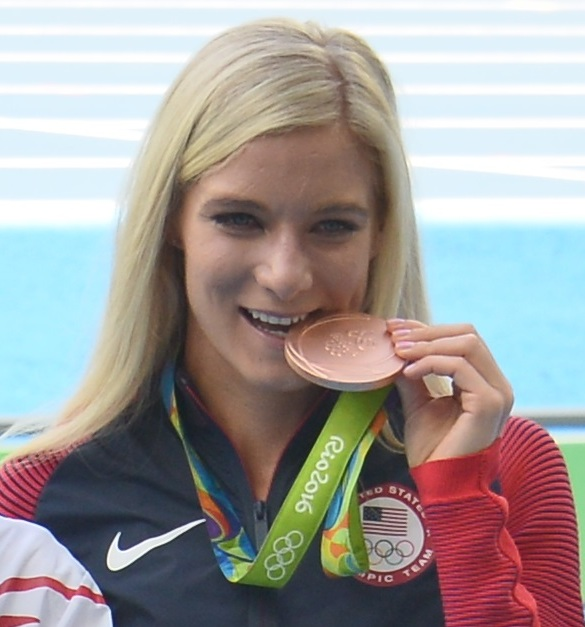
Emma Coburn at the 2016 Olympic games

Olympians

Athlete	Olympics	Event	Place
Mary Decker (United States)	1984	3000m	DNF
Alan Culpepper (United States)	2000	10,000m	H2 17th
Alan Culpepper (United States)	2004	Marathon	12th
Shayne Culpepper (United States)	2000	1500m	H3 9th
Shayne Culpepper (United States)	2004	5000m	H1 13th
Adam Goucher (United States)	2000	5000m	13th
Dathan Ritzenhein (United States)	2004	10,000m	DNF
Dathan Ritzenhein (United States)	2008	Marathon	9th
Dathan Ritzenhein (United States)	2012	10,000m	13th
Jenny Simpson (United States)	2008	Steeplechase	9th
Jenny Simpson (United States)	2012	1500m	SF2 10th
Jenny Simpson (United States)	2016	1500m	3rd
Kara Goucher (United States)	2008	5000m	9th
Kara Goucher (United States)	2008	10,000m	10th
Kara Goucher (United States)	2012	Marathon	11th
Billy Nelson (United States)	2008	Steeplechase	29th
Jorge Torres (United States)	2008	10,000m	27th
Emma Coburn (United States)	2012	Steeplechase	9th
Emma Coburn (United States)	2016	Steeplechase	3rd
Emma Coburn (United States)	2020	Steeplechase	DNF
Shalaya Kipp (United States)	2012	Steeplechase	H1 12th
Joe Klecker (United States)	2020	10,000m	16th
Morgan Pearson	2020	Triathlon mixed relay	2nd
Morgan Pearson	2024	Triathlon mixed relay	2nd
Valerie Constien (United States)	2020	Steeplechase	12th
Valerie Constien (United States)	2024	Steeplechase	15th

== Year by year results ==
	Men's				Women's			
Year	Conference finish	Points	NCAA finish	Points	Conference finish	Points	NCAA finish	Points
Big Eight Conference
1950	4th							
1951	5th	85						
1952	3rd	43						
1953	2nd	19						
1954	4th	54						
1955	3rd	34						
1956	2nd	88						
1957	2nd	52	8th	198				
1958	3rd	98						
1959	5th	98						
1960	8th	180						
1961	2nd	78						
1962	1st	60	7th	202				
1963	4th	85						
1964	3rd	72						
1965	4th	76	14th	281				
1966	2nd	57	6th	248				
1967	2nd	59	3rd	110				
1968	2nd	61	5th	241				
1969	6th	137						
1970	4th	83	15th	450				
1971	4th	110	26th	662				
1972	2nd	76						
1973	2nd	55	T- 6th	217				
1974	6th							
1975	2nd	73	20th	447				
1976	1st	46	20th	471	2nd	59	16th	546
1977	1st	21	10th	303	2nd	62	3rd	164
1978	1st	22	5th	234	2nd	70	4th	147
1979	1st	23	4th	189	5th	108	18th	430
1980	1st	26	13th	369	2nd	75	19th	408
1981	3rd				4th	100	9th	237
1982	1st	35	7th	219	3rd	80		
1983	5th	94			5th	123		
1984	5th	114	22nd	413	3rd	79		
1985	1st	48	3rd	167	5th	106		
1986	1st	37	5th	195	3rd	64	6th	186
1987	3rd	92	15th	385	1st	49	12th	249
1988	2nd	71			6th	120		
1989	3rd	92	18th	365	5th	135		
1990	6th	113			3rd	94		
1991	2nd	86			3rd	93		
1992	1st	42	11th	320	1st	52	20th	454
1993	2nd	49	4th	181	3rd	78	14th	326
1994	2nd	49	2nd	88	1st	29	4th	126
1995	2nd	53	4th	181	1st	25	2nd	123
1996	1st	66	5th	179	1st	30	4th	145
1997	1st	32	3rd	108	1st	23	3rd	178
1998	1st	31	3rd	158	2nd	99	7th	332
1999	1st	22	7th	307	1st	62	8th	351
2000	1st	16	2nd	94	1st	29	1st	117
2001	1st	31	1st	90	1st	33	8th	240
2002	1st	25	4th	190	1st	34	5th	220
2003	1st	38	5th	259	1st	45	5th	269
2004	1st	48	1st	90	1st	25	1st	63
2005	1st	44	5th	222	1st	38	2nd	181
2006	1st	36	1st	94	1st	45	2nd	223
2007	1st	34	7th	287	1st	59	23rd	479
2008	2nd	66	12th	372	5th	145		
2009	2nd	56	6th	315	2nd	52	20th	458
2010	2nd	46	15th	366	2nd	53	6th	314
Pac-12 Conference
2011	1st	46	3rd	144	1st	50	11th	335
2012	1st	49	3rd	158	5th	124	24th	519
2013	1st	28	1st	149	2nd	75	7th	265
2014	1st	30	1st	65	3rd	82	7th	267
2015	1st	46	2nd	91	1st	45	2nd	129
2016	1st	41	6th	223	1st	33	3rd	134
2017	2nd	47	8th	294	1st	53	3rd	139
2018	3rd	82	4th	178	2nd	48	1st	65
2019	1st	41	3rd	164	4th	89	10th	294
2020	2nd	60	14th	398	2nd	50	7th	279
2021	1st	39	8th	249	1st	24	4th	187
2022	2nd	61	8th	281	1st	66	11th	286
2023	4th	81	25th	551	3rd	87	19th	446
Big 12 Conference
2024	5th	122	19th	477	6th	165		
2025	3rd	87	10th	318	5th	128	13th	434
