= 1964 NCAA University Division cross country championships =

1964 cross-country running meet of the NCAA (University Division)

1964 NCAA University Division Cross Country Championships
- Organisers: NCAA
- Edition: 26th
- Date: November 23, 1964
- Host city: East Lansing, MI; Michigan State University
- Venue: Forest Akers East Golf Course
- Distances: 4 miles (6.4 km)
- Participation: 180 athletes

The 1964 NCAA University Division Cross Country Championships were the 26th annual cross country meet to determine the team and individual national champions of men's collegiate cross country running in the United States.

Held on November 23, 1964, the meet was hosted by Michigan State University at the Forest Akers East Golf Course in East Lansing, Michigan. This was the final race hosted by Michigan State after 25 straight years. The distance for this race was 4 miles (6.4 kilometers). This was the final meet held at this distance. Starting in 1965, the race was extended to 6 miles.

All NCAA University Division members were eligible to qualify for the meet. In total, 23 teams and 180 individual runners contested this championship.

The team national championship was won by the Western Michigan Broncos, their first team title. The individual championship was won by Elmore Banton, from Ohio, with a time of 20:07.50.

== Men's title ==
- Distance: 4 miles (6.4 kilometers)

=== Team Result (Top 10) ===
Rank	Team	Points
1st place, gold medalist(s)	Western Michigan	86
2nd place, silver medalist(s)	Oregon	116
3rd place, bronze medalist(s)	Ohio	120
4	Notre Dame	122
5	BYU	136
6	Georgetown	162
7	Miami (OH)	219
8	Houston	235
9	Kansas	254
10	Air Force	288

== See also ==
- NCAA Men's College Division Cross Country Championship
