= 1999 NCAA Division I cross country championships =

1999 cross-country running meet of the NCAA (Division I)

1999 NCAA Division I Cross Country Championships
- Organisers: NCAA
- Edition: 61st–Men; 19th–Women
- Date: November 22, 1999
- Host city: (Indiana) Bloomington, IN
- Venue: Indiana University
- Distances: 10 km–Men; 5 km–Women
- Participation: 254–Men; 254–Women; 508–Total athletes

The 1999 NCAA Division I Cross Country Championships were the 61st annual NCAA Men's Division I Cross Country Championship and the 19th annual NCAA Women's Division I Cross Country Championship to determine the team and individual national champions of NCAA Division I men's and women's collegiate cross country running in the United States. In all, four different titles were contested: men's and women's individual and team championships.

Held on November 22, 1999, the combined meet was hosted by Indiana University in Bloomington, Indiana. The distance for the men's race was 10 kilometers (6.21 miles) while the distance for the women's race was 5 kilometers (3.11 miles).

The men's team championship was won by Arkansas (58 points), the Razorbacks' second consecutive and tenth overall. The women's team championship was won by BYU (72 points), the Cougars' second title (and second in three years).

The two individual champions were, for the men, David Kimani (South Alabama, 30:06.6) and, for the women, Erica Palmer (Wisconsin, 16:39.5).

== Men's title ==
- Distance: 10,000 meters

=== Men's Team Result (Top 10) ===
Rank	Team	Points
1st place, gold medalist(s)	Arkansas	58
2nd place, silver medalist(s)	Wisconsin	185
3rd place, bronze medalist(s)	NC State	201
4	Stanford	223
5	Michigan	282
6	Oregon	306
7	Colorado	307
8	Notre Dame	312
9	Iona	338
10	Arizona	346

=== Men's Individual Result (Top 10) ===
Rank	Name	Team	Time
1st place, gold medalist(s)	(Kenya) David Kimani	South Alabama	30:06.6
2nd place, silver medalist(s)	(Australia) Michael Power	Arkansas	30:09.6
3rd place, bronze medalist(s)	(United States) Steve Fein	Oregon	30:14.3
4	(United States) Matthew Downin	Wisconsin	30:25.9
5	(United States) Matthew Lane	William & Mary	30:27.8
6	(United States) John Schoenfelder	Wisconsin	30:35.7
7	(United States) Andrew Begley	Arkansas	30:40.6
8	(Canada) Paul Morrison	Princeton	30:42.5
9	(Republic of Ireland) Keith Kelly	Providence	30:42.9
10	(Kenya) James Karanu	Arkansas	30:44.7

== Women's title ==
- Distance: 5,000 meters

=== Women's Team Result (Top 10) ===
Rank	Team	Points
1st place, gold medalist(s)	Brigham Young	72
2nd place, silver medalist(s)	Arkansas	125
3rd place, bronze medalist(s)	Stanford	127
4	Wisconsin	185
5	Kansas State	232
6	North Carolina	294
7	Georgetown	321
8	Colorado	351
9	Brown	354
10	Providence	368

=== Women's Individual Result (Top 10) ===
Rank	Name	Team	Time
1st place, gold medalist(s)	(United States) Erica Palmer	Wisconsin	16:39.5
2nd place, silver medalist(s)	(United States) Amy Yoder	Arkansas	16:44.1
3rd place, bronze medalist(s)	(Germany) Larissa Kleinmann	Arkansas	16:48.8
4	(Norway) Hanna Lyngstad	Tulane	16:50.3
5	(United States) Lauren Fleshman	Stanford	16:50.9
6	(United States) Leigh Daniel	Texas Tech	16:51.4
7	(United States) Erin Sullivan	Stanford	16:56.2
8	(Ecuador) Maria-Elena Calle	Virginia Commonwealth	16:57.2
9	(United States) Kara Wheeler	Colorado	16:58.4
10	(Jamaica) Korene Hinds	Kansas State	16:58.6
