= 1992 NCAA Division I cross country championships =

1992 cross-country running meet of the NCAA (Division I)

1992 NCAA Division I Cross Country Championships
- Organisers: NCAA
- Edition: 54th–Men; 12th–Women
- Date: November 23, 1992
- Host city: Bloomington, IN; Indiana University
- Distances: 10 km–Men; 5 km–Women
- Participation: 179–Men; 180–Women; 359–Total athletes

The 1992 NCAA Division I Cross Country Championships were the 54th annual NCAA Men's Division I Cross Country Championship and the 12th annual NCAA Women's Division I Cross Country Championship to determine the team and individual national champions of NCAA Division I men's and women's collegiate cross country running in the United States. In all, four different titles were contested: men's and women's individual and team championships.

Held on November 23, 1992, the combined meet was hosted by Indiana University in Bloomington, Indiana. The distance for the men's race was 10 kilometers (6.21 miles) while the distance for the women's race was 5 kilometers (3.11 miles).

Both team national championships were retained by their respective defending champions: Arkansas for the men (their sixth overall and third consecutive) and Villanova for the women (their fourth overall and second consecutive). The two individual champions were Bob Kennedy (from Indiana) and Carole Zajac (from Villanova).

== Men's title ==
- Distance: 10,000 meters

=== Men's Team Result (Top 10) ===
Rank	Team	Points
1st place, gold medalist(s)	Arkansas	46
2nd place, silver medalist(s)	Wisconsin	87
3rd place, bronze medalist(s)	Providence	108
4	Villanova	153
5	Michigan	214
6	Notre Dame	246
7	U.S. Naval Academy	254
8	Oregon	276
9	Wake Forest	303
10	NC State	305

=== Men's Individual Result (Top 10) ===
Rank	Name	Team	Time
1st place, gold medalist(s)	(United States) Bob Kennedy	Indiana	30:15.3
2nd place, silver medalist(s)	(United States) Gary Stolz	Stanford	30:56.1
3rd place, bronze medalist(s)	(Republic of Ireland) Mark Carroll	Providence	31:00.3
4	(United States) Louie Quintana	Villanova	31:02.6
5	(United States) David Welsh	Arkansas	31:09.8
6	(United States) Jason Casino	Wisconsin	31:11.5
7	(United States) Conor Holt	Oklahoma	31:13.1
8	(United States) Greg Keller	U.S. Naval Academy	31:16.0
9	(United States) Edward O'Carroll	Western Kentucky	31:16.4
10	(United States) Matthew Smith	Michigan	31:17.9

== Women's title ==
- Distance: 5,000 meters

=== Women's Team Result (Top 10) ===
Rank	Team	Points
1st place, gold medalist(s)	Villanova	123
2nd place, silver medalist(s)	Arkansas	130
3rd place, bronze medalist(s)	Georgetown	131
4	Cornell	167
5	Providence	172
6	Wisconsin; Penn State	179
8	Michigan	186
9	Northern Arizona	267
10	BYU	285

=== Women's Individual Result (Top 10) ===
Rank	Name	Team	Time
1st place, gold medalist(s)	(United States) Carole Zajac	Villanova	17:01.9
2nd place, silver medalist(s)	(United States) Deena Drossin	Arkansas	17:12.7
3rd place, bronze medalist(s)	(United States) Nnenna Lynch	Villanova	17:18.5
4	(United States) Janice Brown	William & Mary	17:20.2
5	(United States) Tracy Morris	Iowa	17:26.5
6	(Republic of Ireland) Sinead Delahunty	Providence	17:33.0
7	(United States) Cheri Goddard	Villanova	17:33.4
8	(Poland) Dorota Buczkowska	BYU	17:34.0
9	(United States) Fran ten Bensel	Nebraska	17:34.6
10	(United States) Amy Rudolph	Providence	17:37.5
