= 1984 NCAA Division I cross country championships =

1984 cross-country running meet of the NCAA (Division I)

1984 NCAA Division I Cross Country Championships
- Organisers: NCAA
- Edition: 46th (Men); 4th (Women)
- Date: November 19, 1984
- Host city: State College, PA; Penn State University
- Venue: Penn State Golf Courses
- Distances: 10 km–Men; 5 km–Women
- Participation: 184–Men; 133–Women; 317–Total athletes

The 1984 NCAA Division I Cross Country Championships were the 46th annual NCAA Men's Division I Cross Country Championship and the 4th annual NCAA Women's Division I Cross Country Championship to determine the team and individual national champions of NCAA Division I men's and women's collegiate cross country running in the United States. In all, four different titles were contested: men's and women's individual and team championships.

Held on November 19, 1984, the combined meet was hosted by Penn State University at the Penn State Golf Courses in State College, Pennsylvania. The distance for the men's race was 10 kilometers (6.21 miles) while the distance for the women's race was 5 kilometers (3.11 miles).

The men's team national championship was won by Arkansas, their first national title. The individual championship was won by Ed Eyestone, from BYU, with a time of 29:28.8.

The women's team national championship was won by Wisconsin, their first national title. The individual championship was won by Cathy Branta, from Wisconsin, with a time of 16:15.6.

== Qualification ==
- All Division I cross country teams were eligible to qualify for the meet through their placement at various regional qualifying meets. In total, 21 teams and 184 runners contested the men's championship while 16 teams and 133 runners contested the women's title.

== Men's title ==
- Distance: 10,000 meters (6.21 miles)

=== Men's Team Result (Top 10) ===
Rank	Team	Points
1st place, gold medalist(s)	Arkansas	96
2nd place, silver medalist(s)	Arizona	107
3rd place, bronze medalist(s)	Tennessee	139
4	Wisconsin	153
5	Virginia	184
6	Providence	199
7	Washington State	220
8	Michigan	287
9	NC State	307
10	Iowa State	310

=== Men's Individual Result (Top 10) ===
Rank	Name	Team	Time
1st place, gold medalist(s)	(United States) Ed Eyestone	BYU	29:28.80
2nd place, silver medalist(s)	(Republic of Ireland) Richard O'Flynn	Providence	29:35.50
3rd place, bronze medalist(s)	(Kenya) Yobes Ondieki	Iowa State	29:37.00
4	(United States) John Easker	Wisconsin	29:38.00
5	(United States) Tom Ansberry	Arizona	29:38.10
6	(United States) James Sapienza	Dartmouth	29:45.20
7	(United States) Brent Steiner	Kansas	29:45.30
8	(United States) Tim Hacker	Wisconsin	29:49.20
9	(United States) Larry Chumley	Northern Arizona	29:56.40
10	(United States) Mike Vanalta	Southeast Missouri State	29:56.70

== Women's title ==
- Distance: 5,000 meters (3.11 miles)

=== Women's Team Result (Top 10) ===
Rank	Team	Points
1st place, gold medalist(s)	Wisconsin	63
2nd place, silver medalist(s)	Stanford	89
3rd place, bronze medalist(s)	NC State	99
4	Oregon	119
5	Clemson	173
6	BYU	222
7	Missouri	223
8	Kansas State	242
9	Villanova	256
10	Houston	261

=== Women's Individual Result (Top 10) ===
Rank	Name	Team	Time
1st place, gold medalist(s)	(United States) Cathy Branta	Wisconsin	16:15.60
2nd place, silver medalist(s)	(United States) Shelly Steely	Florida	16:22.20
3rd place, bronze medalist(s)	(United States) Christine McMiken	Oklahoma State	16:30.00
4	(United States) Regina Jacobs	Stanford	16:33.70
5	(United States) Tina Krebs	Clemson	16:37.60
6	(United States) Katie Ishmael	Wisconsin	16:37.70
7	(United States) Allison Wiley	Stanford	16:40.40
8	(United States) Janet Smith	NC State	16:44.60
9	(United States) Sabrina Dornhoefer	Missouri	16:48.60
10	(United States) Holly Murray	North Carolina	16:49.90

== See also ==
- NCAA Men's Division II Cross Country Championship
- NCAA Women's Division II Cross Country Championship
- NCAA Men's Division III Cross Country Championship
- NCAA Women's Division III Cross Country Championship
