= 1988 NCAA Division I cross country championships =

1988 cross-country running meet of the NCAA (Division I)

1988 NCAA Division I Cross Country Championships
- Organisers: NCAA
- Edition: 50th–Men; 8th–Women
- Date: November 21, 1988
- Host city: Granger, IA; Iowa State University
- Venue: Jester Park
- Distances: 10 km–Men; 5 km–Women
- Participation: 184–Men; 135–Women; 319–Total athletes

The 1988 NCAA Division I Cross Country Championships were the 50th annual NCAA Men's Division I Cross Country Championship and the 8th annual NCAA Women's Division I Cross Country Championship to determine the team and individual national champions of NCAA Division I men's and women's collegiate cross country running in the United States. In all, four different titles were contested: men's and women's individual and team championships.

Held on November 21, 1988, the combined meet was hosted by Iowa State University at Jester Park in Granger, Iowa. The distance for the men's race was 10 kilometers (6.21 miles) while the distance for the women's race was 5 kilometers (3.11 miles).

The men's team national championship was won by Wisconsin, their third national title. The individual championship was won by Bob Kennedy, also from Indiana, with a time of 29:20.

The women's team national championship was won by Kentucky, their first national title. The individual championship was won by Michelle Dekkers, from Indiana, with a time of 16:30.

== Qualification ==
- All Division I cross country teams were eligible to qualify for the meet through their placement at various regional qualifying meets. In total, 22 teams and 184 runners contested the men's championship while 15 teams and 135 runners contested the women's title.

== Men's title ==
- Distance: 10,000 meters (6.21 miles)

=== Men's Team Result (Top 10) ===
| Rank | Team | Points | Avg. Time |
|---|---|---|---|
| 1st place, gold medalist(s) | Wisconsin | 100 | 30:04 |
| 2nd place, silver medalist(s) | Northern Arizona | 156 | 30:15 |
| 3rd place, bronze medalist(s) | Tennessee | 172 | 30:22 |
| 4 | Clemson | 193 | 30:23 |
| 5 | Dartmouth | 195 | 30:32 |
| 6 | Iowa State | 201 | 30:29 |
| 7 | Oregon | 228 | 30:39 |
| 8 | Kentucky | 237 | 30:35 |
| 9 | Notre Dame | 250 | 30:38 |
| 10 | Arkansas | 251 | 30:41 |

=== Men's Individual Result (Top 10) ===
| Rank | Name | Team | Time |
|---|---|---|---|
| 1st place, gold medalist(s) | (United States) Bob Kennedy | Indiana | 29:20 |
| 2nd place, silver medalist(s) | (Israel) Yehezkel Halifa | Clemson | 29:21 |
| 3rd place, bronze medalist(s) | (United States) Bo Reed | Northern Arizona | 29:24 |
| 4 | (United States) Thomas O'Gara | East Tennessee State | 29:28 |
| 5 | (United States) Chris Zinn | Arkansas | 29:31 |
| 6 | (United States) Dov Kremer | Clemson | 29:36 |
| 7 | (United States) Harry Green | Texas | 29:38 |
| 8 | (United States) Milfred Tewawina (United States) Dan Garrett | Northern Arizona; Notre Dame | 29:41 |
| 9 | (United States) Sean McGuirk | Iona | 29:44 |
| 10 | (United States) Ron Markezich | Notre Dame | 29:45 |

== Women's title ==
- Distance: 5,000 meters (3.11 miles)

=== Women's Team Result (Top 10) ===
| Rank | Team | Points | Avg. Time |
|---|---|---|---|
| 1st place, gold medalist(s) | Kentucky | 75 | 17:09 |
| 2nd place, silver medalist(s) | Oregon | 126 | 17:19 |
| 3rd place, bronze medalist(s) | Nebraska | 139 | 17:20 |
| 4 | NC State | 141 | 17:24 |
| 5 | Wisconsin | 167 | 17:27 |
| 6 | Indiana | 169 | 17:25 |
| 7 | Michigan | 182 | 17:35 |
| 8 | California; Yale | 226 | 17:43 |
| 9 | Georgetown | 227 | 17:42 |
| 10 | Oklahoma State | 241 | 17:39 |

=== Women's Individual Result (Top 10) ===
| Rank | Name | Team | Time |
|---|---|---|---|
| 1st place, gold medalist(s) | (South Africa) Michelle Dekkers | Indiana | 16:30 |
| 2nd place, silver medalist(s) | (Sweden) Kristina Ljungberg | UTEP | 16:34 |
| 3rd place, bronze medalist(s) | (New Zealand) Sonia Barry (New Zealand) Jacqueline Goodman | Oklahoma State; Oklahoma State | 16:36 |
| 4 | (Canada) Carole Trepanier | Alabama | 16:43 |
| 5 | (United States) Suzy Favor | Wisconsin | 16:46 |
| 6 | Sammie Resh | Nebraska | 16:48 |
| 7 | (Republic of Ireland) Tina Moloney | Providence | 16:49 |
| 8 | Rosalind Taylor; Penny Graves | Maryland; Oregon | 16:50 |
| 9 | Lisa Breiding | Kentucky | 16:52 |
| 10 | (Republic of Ireland) Valerie McGovern | Kentucky | 16:54 |

== See also ==
- NCAA Men's Cross Country Championships (Division II, Division III)
- NCAA Women's Cross Country Championships (Division II, Division III)
