= 2005 NCAA Division I cross country championships =

2005 cross-country running meet of the NCAA (Division I)

2005 NCAA Division I Cross Country Championships
- Organisers: NCAA
- Edition: 67th–Men; 25th–Women
- Date: November 21, 2005
- Host city: (Indiana) Terre Haute, IN
- Venue: Indiana State University; LaVern Gibson Championship Cross Country Course
- Distances: 10 km–Men; 6 km–Women
- Participation: 242–Men; 250–Women; 492–Total athletes

The 2005 NCAA Division I Cross Country Championships were the 67th annual NCAA Men's Division I Cross Country Championship and the 25th annual NCAA Women's Division I Cross Country Championship to determine the team and individual national champions of NCAA Division I men's and women's collegiate cross country running in the United States. In all, four different titles were contested: men's and women's individual and team championships.

Held on November 21, 2005, the combined meet was the second of eight consecutive meets hosted by Indiana State University at the LaVern Gibson Championship Cross Country Course in Terre Haute, Indiana. The distance for the men's race was 10 kilometers (6.2 miles) while the distance for the women's race was 6 kilometers (3.7 miles).

The men's team championship was won by Wisconsin (37 points), the Badgers' fourth. The women's team championship was won by Stanford (146 points), the Cardinal's third (and second in three years).

The two individual champions were, for the men, Simon Bairu (Wisconsin, 29:15.9) and, for the women, Johanna Nilsson (Northern Arizona, 19:33.9). It was the second consecutive title for Bairu.

== Men's title ==
- Distance: 10,000 meters

=== Men's Team Result (Top 10) ===
Rank	Team	Points
1st place, gold medalist(s)	Wisconsin	37
2nd place, silver medalist(s)	Arkansas	105
3rd place, bronze medalist(s)	Notre Dame	178
4	Iona	205
5	Colorado	222
6	Stanford	231
7	Texas	272
8	Oklahoma State	355
9	Portland	372
10	Arizona	384

=== Men's Individual Result (Top 10) ===
Rank	Name	Team	Time
1st place, gold medalist(s)	(Canada) Simon Bairu	Wisconsin	29:15.9
2nd place, silver medalist(s)	(Kenya) Richard Kiplagat	Iona	29:21.9
3rd place, bronze medalist(s)	(United States) Chris Solinsky	Wisconsin	29:27.8
4	(United States) Josh McDougal	Liberty	29:32.6
5	(United States) Westley Keating	Texas–Pan American	29:38.1
6	(United States) Josh Rohatinsky	BYU	29:40.2
7	(United States) Josphat Boit	Arkansas	29:49.1
8	(Canada) Kurt Benninger	Notre Dame	29:50.2
9	(United States) Matt Withrow	Wisconsin	29:50.7
10	(United States) Robert Cheseret	Arizona	29:50.8

== Women's title ==
- Distance: 6,000 meters

=== Women's Team Result (Top 10) ===
Rank	Team	Points
1st place, gold medalist(s)	Stanford	146
2nd place, silver medalist(s)	Colorado	181
3rd place, bronze medalist(s)	Duke	185
4	Arizona State	191
5	Illinois	212
6	Michigan	250
7	Notre Dame	252
8	BYU	288
9	Minnesota	361
10	Oklahoma State	377

=== Women's Individual Result (Top 10) ===
Rank	Name	Team	Time
1st place, gold medalist(s)	(Sweden) Johanna Nilsson	Northern Arizona	19:33.9
2nd place, silver medalist(s)	(United States) Caroline Bierbaum	Columbia-Barnard	19:46.0
3rd place, bronze medalist(s)	(United States) Stephanie Madia	Notre Dame	19:48.4
4	(Australia) Victoria Mitchell	Butler University	19:50.4
5	(United States) Clara Horowitz	Duke	19:50.7
6	(United States) Keira Carlstrom	American	19:58.1
7	(United States) Christine Bolf	Colorado	19:58.8
8	(United States) Arianna Lambie	Stanford	19:59.1
9	(United States) Liza Pasciuto	Colorado	20:01.2
10	(United States) Cack Ferrell	Princeton	20:03.1
