= 1962 NCAA University Division cross country championships =

1962 cross-country running meet of the NCAA (University Division)

1962 NCAA University Division Cross Country Championships
- Organisers: NCAA
- Edition: 24th
- Date: November 26, 1962
- Host city: East Lansing, MI; Michigan State University
- Venue: Forest Akers East Golf Course
- Distances: 4 miles (6.4 km)
- Participation: 136 athletes

The 1962 NCAA University Division Cross Country Championships were the 24th annual cross country meet to determine the team and individual national champions of men's collegiate cross country running in the United States. Held on November 26, 1962, the meet was hosted by Michigan State University at the Forest Akers East Golf Course in East Lansing, Michigan. The distance for the race was 4 miles (6.4 kilometers).

All NCAA University Division members were eligible to qualify for the meet. In total, 14 teams and 136 individual runners contested this championship.

The team national championship was won by the San José State Spartans, their first. They were the first racially integrated team to win the national cross country championship. The individual championship was won by Tom O'Hara, from Loyola–Chicago, with a time of 19:20.30.

== Men's title ==
- Distance: 4 miles (6.4 kilometers)

=== Team Result (Top 10) ===
Rank	Team	Points
1st place, gold medalist(s)	San José State	58
2nd place, silver medalist(s)	Villanova	69
3rd place, bronze medalist(s)	Western Michigan	120
4	Houston	134
5	Iowa	147
6	Ohio	165
7	Colorado	202
8	Oregon State	206
9	Idaho	229
10	Kansas	232

== See also ==
- NCAA Men's College Division Cross Country Championship
