= Deacon Jones (runner) =

American steeplechase runner

Charles "Deacon" Jones
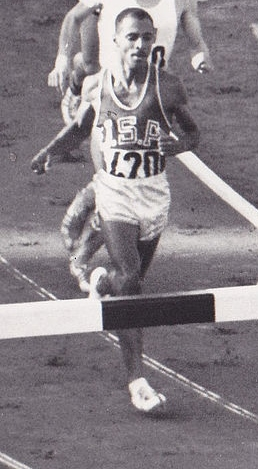
- Jones running the 3000 meter steeplechase at the 1960 Summer Olympics

Personal information
- Born: August 31, 1934 Saint Paul, Minnesota, United States
- Died: September 7, 2007 (aged 73) Hillside, Illinois, United States
- Height: 5 ft 10 in (1.78 m)
- Weight: 146 lb (66 kg)

Sport
- Sport: Track
- Event: Steeplechase
- College team: Iowa
- Club: U.S. Army

Achievements and titles
- Personal best: 3k steeple: 8:42.4
Medal record
Representing the United States
Pan American Games
Silver medal – second place	1959	Steeplechase

Charles Nicholas "Deacon" Jones (August 31, 1934 – September 7, 2007) was an American steeplechase runner. He competed at the 1956 and 1960 Olympics and finished in ninth and seventh place, respectively. He was a three-time AAU champion (1957–58 and 1961) and won a silver medal at the 1959 Pan American Games.

== Running career ==
=== Youth ===
"I was definitely a rarity in those days...I was a black athlete from Nebraska who was a distance runner. People kind of did a double-take when they saw me out there."

— Deacon Jones in 2005.

At the age of 13, Jones won a mile race at an intramural track meet in Boys Town, Nebraska, in a time of 4:35. He ran the race in street shoes, and was especially motivated by ice cream as a reward for the top race finishers. He went on to post a time of 4:17.6 in the mile in 1954 as a high school student, a national high school record at the time. In addition to track, he played as a halfback for the Boys Town High School football team, as a guard on their basketball team, and played right field on the baseball team. The basketball team he played on made it to Nebraska's state high school championships, and was an all-state performer in football. His coach, George Pfeifer, said that Jones was "the best all-around athlete I ever saw."

He turned 19 years old on August 31 his senior year of high school, losing eligibility to run races in his last year of high school. He ran for a year in addition to working as an umpire at baseball games, and played both baseball and basketball with Bob Gibson.

"If not for Boys Town, I probably would have met the fate of a lot of kids I grew up with in St. Paul...A lot of those kids fell on bad times. A lot of them went to prison. I am very thankful for my time at Boys Town. That place saved my life." -Jones in 2005.

=== Collegiate ===
Jones was recruited by University of Iowa. He went on to win the men's 6.4 kilometer race at the 1955 NCAA Cross Country Championships in 19:57.4. It was the first time a sophomore ever won the championship. By the time he graduated from Iowa, he set the school record in the 3000 meter steeplechase at 8:47.4.

=== Post-collegiate ===
Jones was the only American to qualify for the final heat in the men's 3000-meter steeplechase at the 1956 Summer Olympics. He finished in ninth overall.

He was the men's runner-up in the 3000 meter steeplechase at the 1959 Pan American Games. It was during this competition where Jones met Cassius Clay before he changed his name to Muhammad Ali. Having been a barber in his childhood, Jones gave many people haircuts. Clay walked into his dorm and asked for a haircut. After Jones cut his hair, Clay wasn't satisfied and talked trash. And so Jones replied to him, "If you want a better haircut, you have to come in here with better hair."
