= Joe Falcon (athlete) =

American middle-distance runner

Joe Falcon (born June 23, 1966) is a former US middle-distance runner whose greatest success was his victory in the 1990 Oslo Dream Mile with a time of 3:49.31 minutes, which was the fastest mile in the world in 1990. In the course of the race, he ran a personal best over 1500 m of 3:33.6. Also, in 1990 Joe won the 5000 meter at the Prefontaine Classic in Eugene, Oregon in 13:20, with a last lap under 53 seconds.

== Running career ==
Falcon attended Belton High School in Missouri. While there, he won the Missouri High School cross country division 1A-3A race in 1983, running the 5000 meter race in a time of 15:57.5. In 1984, he had a stellar track season, running 1:52.45 (800 m), 4:06.6 (1600 m), and 8:53.35 (3200 m).

Falcon ran at the University of Arkansas under legendary coach John McDonnell. He was the anchor leg of the Arkansas Razorbacks distance medley relay that won at the 1986 Penn Relays and was the NCAA Cross Country Champion in 1987. He was named most outstanding performer among college men at both the 1988 and 1989 Penn Relays.

Falcon won six individual NCAA titles in cross country, indoor and outdoor track: indoor 3,000 m champion 1987 & 1988, indoor mile champ 1988, outdoor 10,000 m champion 1987, outdoor 1,500 m champion 1988 and cross country champion 1987.

On August 10, 1990, he suffered a torn sheath in his left Achilles' tendon during a race in Brussels, Belgium after another runner accidentally spiked him.

It has been said, on a side note, that Joe Falcon could also bench press over 280 lbs, (290 lbs actually reported eyewitnesses) an astonishing amount for his small frame.

Falcon worked as a police lieutenant in Bentonville, Arkansas before retiring and served on the local school board. He is married with three children.

== Rankings and recognition ==
Falcon was ranked among the top ten runners in his event in the US and the world by Track and Field News on numerous occasions:

Year	Event	World rank	US rank
1988	1500 meters	-	7th
1989	1500 meters	-	3rd
	5000 meters	-	1st
1990	1500 meters	3rd	1st
1991	1500 meters	-	8th
1992	1500 meters	-	3rd
1993	1500 meters	-	5th
	10,000 meters	-	7th

In 1990, Falcon received the prestigious Glenn Cunningham Award from the USATF as the top American male distance runner.
