= 1997 NCAA Division I cross country championships =

1997 cross-country running meet of the NCAA (Division I)

1997 NCAA Division I Cross Country Championships
- Organisers: NCAA
- Edition: 59th–Men; 17th–Women
- Date: November 24, 1997
- Host city: (South Carolina) Greenville, SC
- Venue: Furman University
- Distances: 10 km–Men; 5 km–Women
- Participation: 179–Men; 180–Women; 359–Total athletes

The 1997 NCAA Division I Cross Country Championships were the 59th annual NCAA Men's Division I Cross Country Championship and the 17th annual NCAA Women's Division I Cross Country Championship to determine the team and individual national champions of NCAA Division I men's and women's collegiate cross country running in the United States. In all, four different titles were contested: men's and women's individual and team championships.

Held on November 24, 1997, the combined meet was hosted by Furman University in Greenville, South Carolina. The distance for the men's race was 10 kilometers (6.21 miles) while the distance for the women's race was 5 kilometers (3.11 miles).

The men's team championship was again won by Stanford (53 points), the Cardinal's second overall and second consecutive. The women's team championship was won by BYU (100 points), the Cougars' first.

The two individual champions were, for the men, Meb Keflezighi (UCLA, 28:54) and, for the women, Carrie Tollefson (Villanova, 16:29).

== Men's title ==
- Distance: 10,000 meters

=== Men's Team Result (Top 10) ===
Rank	Team	Points
1st place, gold medalist(s)	Stanford	53
2nd place, silver medalist(s)	Arkansas	56
3rd place, bronze medalist(s)	Colorado	108
4	Michigan	116
5	Wisconsin	201
6	NC State	214
7	Michigan State	257
8	Oregon	266
9	William and Mary	274
10	Weber State	278

=== Men's Individual Result (Top 10) ===
Rank	Name	Team	Time
1st place, gold medalist(s)	(Eritrea) Meb Keflezighi	UCLA	28:54
2nd place, silver medalist(s)	(Canada) Kevin Sullivan	Michigan	29:01
3rd place, bronze medalist(s)	(Kenya) Bernard Lagat	Washington State	29:05
4	(United States) Adam Goucher	Colorado	29:10
5	(United States) Ryan Wilson	Arkansas	29:13
6	(Kenya) Cleophas Boor	Nebraska	29:22
7	(United States) Abdi Abdirahman	Arizona	29:26
8	(United States) Nathan Nutter	Stanford	29:34
9	(Canada) Sean Kaley	Arkansas	29:39
10	(United States) Brad Hauser	Stanford	29:42

== Women's title ==
- Distance: 5,000 meters

=== Women's Team Result (Top 10) ===
Rank	Team	Points
1st place, gold medalist(s)	BYU	100
2nd place, silver medalist(s)	Stanford	102
3rd place, bronze medalist(s)	Colorado	178
4	Dartmouth	205
5	Wisconsin	227
6	Providence	230
7	Michigan	232
8	Oregon	234
9	Boston College	240
10	Georgetown	256

=== Women's Individual Result (Top 10) ===
Rank	Name	Team	Time
1st place, gold medalist(s)	(United States) Carrie Tollefson	Villanova	16:29
2nd place, silver medalist(s)	(United States) Amy Skieresz	Arizona	16:39
3rd place, bronze medalist(s)	(United States) Angela Graham	Boston College	16:47
4	(United States) Julia Stamps	Stanford	16:47
5	(United States) Katie McGregor	Michigan	16:48
6	(Canada) Carmen Douma	Villanova	16:50
7	(United States) Amy Yoder	Arkansas	16:56
8	(United States) Courtney Pugmire	BYU	16:58
9	(United States) Marie Davis	Oregon	16:59
10	(United States) Amy Swier	Northern Arizona	16:59
