= Oklahoma State Cowgirls cross country =

- University: Oklahoma State University
- Head coach: Dave Smith (16th season)
- Conference: Big 12
- Location: Stillwater, Oklahoma, US
- Nickname: Cowgirls
- Colors: Orange and black

Women's NCAA appearances
- 1988, 1989, 1998, 2001, 2005, 2010, 2011, 2012, 2015, 2016, 2017, 2018, 2020, 2021, 2022, 2023, 2024, 2025, 2026

Women's conference champions
- 1986, 2015, 2019, 2021, 2022

The Oklahoma State Cowgirls cross country team is the women's cross country team of Oklahoma State University in Stillwater, Oklahoma. The Cowgirls compete in the Big 12 Conference at the Division I level in the NCAA and are currently led by 16th year head coach, Dave Smith.

The Oklahoma State women's cross country program has become one of the most successful programs in the country recently, earning a school-record 3rd–place NCAA Championship finish in 2023. The Cowgirls have also won five conference titles, most recently winning the Big 12 in 2022.

== History ==
The Oklahoma State Cowgirls cross country program began in 1978. A decade later, the Cowgirls made their first of 17 NCAA Cross Country Championship appearances in 1988, where they finished 11th. The program had mixed success, highlighted by a 1986 Big Eight conference title and a 5th place finish at the 1989 NCAA Championship, but it was Dave Smith who brought the most success to the Cowgirl program when he was hired to the position in 2009.

Under Smith, the women's cross country team has won four conference titles, winning the Big 12 in 2015, 2019, 2021 and 2022. The Cowgirls have also scored their best national finishes recently, finishing 7th in 2015 before scoring a 4th–place finish in 2022. In 2023, the program claimed a 3rd–place finish, only 33 points behind the national champions, the best finish ever for the program.

== NCAA Championship results ==
Women's Championship Results

Year	Points	Place
1988	241	11th
1989	202	5th
1998	462	20th
2001	482	18th
2005	377	10th
2010	417	17th
2011	701	30th
2012	565	26th
2015	274	7th
2016	465	17th
2017	748	30th
2018	481	19th
2020	535	24th
2021	404	13th
2022	201	4th
2023	156	3rd
2024	598	27th
2025	432	12th
2026	444	15th

== Honors ==
=== All–Americans ===
16 Cowgirl runners have received a total of 24 All-American honors, including two runners (Jackie Goodman from 1986–89 and Taylor Roe from 2020–23) being four–time All–American recipients.

=== Conference champions ===
6 Cowgirl runners have won a total of 8 individual conference championships. Christine McMiken won three straight Big Eight titles from 1984–86, and Taylor Roe is the most recent winner, winning the Big 12 individual championship in 2023.

== Greiner Family OSU Cross Country Course ==
The Greiner Family OSU Cross Country Course was unveiled in summer of 2019, and features multiple different length configurations depending on the individual runner. The course, located on the Oklahoma State campus, consists of just under one million square feet of Astro Bermuda grass and is carved through wooded areas and prairie with varying elevations.

One of the best cross country courses in the nation, the course was selected to host the 2020 and 2022 NCAA Championships, along with the 2021 and 2026 Big 12 Championships. In October 2024, it was announced that the course will again be hosting the NCAA Championships, this time in 2027.

== See also ==
- Oklahoma State Cowboys and Cowgirls
- Oklahoma State Cowboys cross country
