= Vic Zwolak =

American middle-distance runner

Personal information
- Full name: Victor Andrew Zwolak
- Nationality: American
- Born: November 30, 1938 (age 87) Wilmington, Delaware, U.S.

Sport
- Sport: Middle-distance running
- Event: Steeplechase

Victor Andrew Zwolak (born November 30, 1938) is an American middle-distance runner. He competed in the men's 3000 metres steeplechase at the 1964 Summer Olympics. He was inducted into the Delaware Sports Museum and Hall of Fame in 1976.

Competing for the Villanova Wildcats track and field team, Zwolak won the 1963 and 1964 NCAA University Division Track and Field Championships in the 3000 m steeplechase. He also won the 1963 NCAA University Division Cross Country Championships individually. Before Villanova, he competed briefly for Oregon State University.
