= 2001 NCAA Division I cross country championships =

2001 cross-country running meet of the NCAA (Division I)

2001 NCAA Division I Cross Country Championships
- Organisers: NCAA
- Edition: 63rd–Men; 21st–Women
- Date: November 19, 2001
- Host city: (South Carolina) Greenville, SC
- Venue: Furman University
- Distances: 10 km–Men; 6 km–Women
- Participation: 253–Men; 252–Women; 505–Total athletes

The 2001 NCAA Division I Cross Country Championships were the 63rd annual NCAA Men's Division I Cross Country Championship and the 21st annual NCAA Women's Division I Cross Country Championship to determine the team and individual national champions of NCAA Division I men's and women's collegiate cross country running in the United States. In all, four different titles were contested: men's and women's individual and team championships.

Held on November 19, 2001, the combined meet was hosted by Furman University in Greenville, South Carolina. The distance for the men's race was 10 kilometers (6.21 miles) while the distance for the women's race was 6 kilometers (3.73 miles) for the first time, 1,000 meets longer than in previous years.

The men's team championship was won by Colorado (90 points), the Buffaloes' first. The women's team championship was won by BYU (62 points), the Cougars' third overall (and third in five years).

The two individual champions were, for the men, Boaz Cheboiywo (Eastern Michigan, 28:47) and, for the women, Tara Chaplin (Arizona, 20:24).

== Men's title ==
- Distance: 10,000 meters

=== Men's Team Result (Top 10) ===
Rank	Team	Points
1st place, gold medalist(s)	Colorado	90
2nd place, silver medalist(s)	Stanford	91
3rd place, bronze medalist(s)	Arkansas	118
4	Northern Arizona	193
5	Wisconsin	245
6	Notre Dame	248
7	Portland	273
8	Villanova	282
9	NC State	293
10	Providence	294

=== Men's Individual Result (Top 10) ===
Rank	Name	Team	Time
1st place, gold medalist(s)	(Kenya) Boaz Cheboiywo	Eastern Michigan	28:47
2nd place, silver medalist(s)	(United States) Jorge Torres	Colorado	29:06
3rd place, bronze medalist(s)	(Republic of Ireland) Alistair Cragg	Arkansas	29:10
4	(United States) Dathan Ritzenhein	Colorado	29:11
5	(United States) Luke Watson	Notre Dame	29:19
6	(United States) Ryan Shay	Notre Dame	29:23
7	(United States) Donald Sage	Stanford	29:24
8	(United States) Matt Tegenkamp	Wisconsin	29:26
9	(United States) Josh Spiker	Wisconsin	29:29
10	(United States) Travis Laird	Northern Arizona	29:31

== Women's title ==
- Distance: 6,000 meters

=== Women's Team Result (Top 10) ===
Rank	Team	Points
1st place, gold medalist(s)	BYU	62
2nd place, silver medalist(s)	NC State	148
3rd place, bronze medalist(s)	Georgetown	180
4	Arizona	194
5	Stanford	206
6	Boston College	232
7	North Carolina	239
8	Colorado	240
9	Virginia	303
10	Providence	337

=== Women's Individual Result (Top 10) ===
Rank	Name	Team	Time
1st place, gold medalist(s)	(United States) Tara Chaplin	Arizona	20:24
2nd place, silver medalist(s)	(United States) Renee Metivier	Georgia Tech	20:31
3rd place, bronze medalist(s)	(United States) Lauren Fleshman	Stanford	20:35
4	(United States) Kristin Price	NC State	20:36
5	(Czech Republic) Michaela Manova	BYU	20:42
6	(United States) Jennifer Owens	Virginia	20:43
7	(United States) Jessie Kindschi	BYU	20:49
8	(United States) Molly Austin	Colorado	20:51
9	(United States) Tara Northcutt	BYU	20:55
10	(United States) Maggie Guiney	Boston College	20:56
