= Tom O'Hara (runner) =

American middle-distance runner (1942–2019)

Tom O'Hara (July 5, 1942 – August 27, 2019) was an American middle-distance runner. He was the first native of the state of Illinois to break the four-minute barrier for the mile run when he ran 3:59.4 in 1963. O'Hara was born in Chicago, Illinois. He also held the world record for fastest mile indoors, which was set when he ran 3:56.6 on February 13, 1964. He beat that record on March 6 of the same year with a time of 3:56.4, a world record, later equalled by Jim Ryun but not beaten for ten years until Tony Waldrop ran 3:55.0 in 1974.

At St. Ignatius College Prep High School, in Chicago, Illinois, O'Hara was a star runner on the school's cross country and track and field teams, often running—and winning—the quarter mile, half mile, mile, and mile relay in a single meet. He was a member of the Loyola University Chicago track, cross country, and indoor track teams. He was the individual champion of NCAA Men's Division I Cross Country Championship in 1962, and he participated in the 1500 m at the 1964 Summer Olympics, where he qualified for the semi-finals of the 1500 metres.
