= Max Truex =

American Olympic long-distance runner (1935–1991)

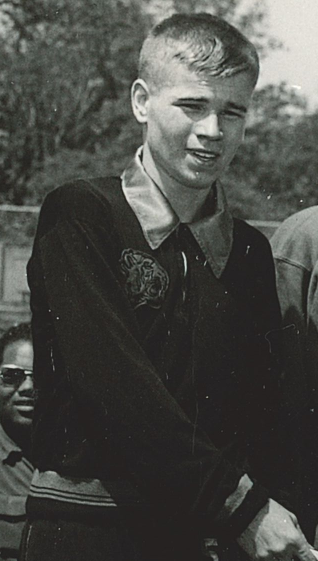

Personal information
- Born: November 4, 1935 Warsaw, Indiana, U.S.
- Died: March 24, 1991 (aged 55) Milton, Massachusetts, U.S.
- Height: 5 ft 5 in (1.65 m)

Sport
- Country: United States
- Events: 5000 meters, 10,000 meters, marathon
- College team: USC Trojans

Max Edwin Truex (/tʃruɛks/; November 4, 1935, in Warsaw, Indiana – March 24, 1991, in Milton, Massachusetts) was an American long-distance runner. He was a two-time Olympian, running the 10,000 metres at the 1956 and 1960 Olympics. He also was a two-time United States champion in the 6 mile run, the imperial equivalent and added a 3-mile championship in 1962 (though he actually finished second to New Zealander Murray Halberg).

== Prep ==
While running for Warsaw High School (class of 1954), Truex came to fame by setting the national high school record in the mile at 4:20.4, the record that had been held by Louis Zamperini for close to 20 years. He went to the University of Southern California where he joined the Air Force Reserve Officer Training Corps.

== NCAA ==
He won the 1957 NCAA Men's Cross Country Championship and on the track set the NCAA 2 mile record. While at USC, he won his first Amateur Athletic Union (AAU) National Championship and the 1956 Olympic Trials. But the college sophomore went to the Olympics injured and was unable to finish his race. At the Fresno Relays, he added the American record in the 5,000 meters at 14:14.5, setting the 3 mile record at 13:47.6 along the way. Three weeks later in Compton, California he knocked ten seconds off the mark. That mark still ranks him #2 time on the USC all-time list. By the time he graduated, he was already in the Air Force as a lieutenant at the Oxnard Air Force Base, where Olympian Bob Schul and world record holder Eddie Southern were also training.

== Olympian ==
He became part of the Southern California Striders, a dominant track team of this period. His second national championship in 1959 qualified him to run in the 1959 Pan American Games.

In 1960, he won the Olympic trials, then finished 6th in the Olympics. In the 1960 Summer Olympics in Rome, Max Truex set the American record in the 10,000 meters, 28:50:2, in finishing sixth in an event long dominated by Europeans.

In 1962, Truex won the national championships in the 3 mile run. This qualified him to run in the USA-USSR dual meet, the biggest meet of the year. During that race, he developed a 2-inch blood blister. He tried to heal it for a year with no success. He finally retired and returned to USC to get his law degree.

== Personal ==
At the age of 40, he was diagnosed with Parkinson's disease. The disease deteriorated his quality of life rapidly. He had to retire early, eventually seeking unconventional fetal brain transplant surgery in China. He died at the age of 55.
