= 1965 NCAA University Division cross country championships =

1965 cross-country running meet of the NCAA (University Division)

1965 NCAA University Division Cross Country Championships
- Organisers: NCAA
- Edition: 27th
- Date: November 22, 1965
- Host city: Lawrence, KS; University of Kansas
- Venue: Rim Rock Farm
- Distances: 6 miles (9.7 km)
- Participation: 148 athletes

The 1965 NCAA University Division Cross Country Championships were the 27th annual cross country meet to determine the team and individual national champions of men's collegiate cross country running in the United States. Held on November 22, 1965, the meet was hosted by the University of Kansas at Rim Rock Farm in Lawrence, Kansas. This was the first meet not held at Michigan State. The distance for this race was extended to 6 miles (9.7 kilometers).

All NCAA University Division members were eligible to qualify for the meet. In total, 17 teams and 148 individual runners contested this championship.

The team national championship was retained by the Western Michigan Broncos, their second team title. The individual championship was won by John Lawson, from the University of Kansas, with a time of 29:24.00. Given this was the first race at 6 miles, Lawson's time became the meet's distance record. However, his time would be superseded the following year, 1966, by Gerry Lindgren from Washington State.

== Men's title ==
- Distance: 6 miles (9.7 kilometers)

=== Team Result (Top 10) ===
Rank	Team	Points
1st place, gold medalist(s)	Western Michigan	81
2nd place, silver medalist(s)	Kansas State	92
3rd place, bronze medalist(s)	Northwestern	114
4	Tennessee	138
5	Georgetown	139
6	Oklahoma State	185
7	Notre Dame	225
8	Oregon	228
9	Wyoming	266
10	BYU	271

== See also ==
- NCAA Men's Division II Cross Country Championship
