= 2000 NCAA Division I cross country championships =

2000 cross-country running meet of the NCAA (Division I)

1999 NCAA Division I Cross Country Championships
- Organisers: NCAA
- Edition: 62nd–Men; 20th–Women
- Date: November 20, 2000
- Host city: (Iowa) Ames, IA
- Venue: Iowa State University
- Distances: 10 km–Men; 5 km–Women
- Participation: 253–Men; 252–Women; 505–Total athletes

The 2000 NCAA Division I Cross Country Championships were the 62nd annual NCAA Men's Division I Cross Country Championship and the 20th annual NCAA Women's Division I Cross Country Championship to determine the team and individual national champions of NCAA Division I men's and women's collegiate cross country running in the United States. In all, four different titles were contested: men's and women's individual and team championships.

Held on November 20, 2000, the combined meet was hosted by Iowa State University in Ames, Iowa. The distance for the men's race was 10 kilometres (6.2 mi) while the distance for the women's race was 6 kilometres (3.7 mi). This championship was one of the coldest on record with 20 miles per hour (32 km/h) winds holding wind chills around 0 °F (−18 °C) at race time.

The men's team championship was won by Arkansas (83 points), the Razorbacks' third consecutive and eleventh overall. The women's team championship was won by Colorado (117 points), the Buffaloes' first.

The two individual champions were, for the men, Keith Kelly (Providence, 30:14.5) and, for the women, Kara Grgas-Wheeler (Colorado, 20:30.5).

== Men's title ==
- Distance: 10,000 meters

=== Men's Team Result (Top 10) ===
Rank	Team	Points
1st place, gold medalist(s)	Arkansas	83
2nd place, silver medalist(s)	Colorado	94
3rd place, bronze medalist(s)	Providence	121
4	Stanford	149
5	Wisconsin	167
6	Villanova	181
7-Tie	Georgetown	269
7-Tie	Northern Arizona	269
9	Notre Dame	276
10	William & Mary	363

=== Men's Individual Result (Top 10) ===
Rank	Name	Team	Time
1st place, gold medalist(s)	(Republic of Ireland) Keith Kelly	Providence	30:14.5
2nd place, silver medalist(s)	(Kenya) Stephen Ondieki	Fairleigh Dickinson	30:16.3
3rd place, bronze medalist(s)	(United States) Jorge Torres	Colorado	30:21.4
4	(Kenya) David Kimani	Alabama	30:21.6
5	(United States) Franklyn Sanchez	Georgetown	30:26.9
6	(United States) Ian Connor	Ohio State	30:29.0
7	(United States) Luke Watson	Notre Dame	30:29.4
8	(United States) Jason Vanderhoof	Wisconsin	30:30.2
9	(New Zealand) Adrian Blincoe	Villanova	30:32.0
10	(United States) Jonathon Riley	Stanford	30:40.6

== Women's title ==
- Distance: 6,000 meters

=== Women's Team Result (Top 10) ===
Rank	Team	Points
1st place, gold medalist(s)	Colorado	117
2nd place, silver medalist(s)	BYU	167
3rd place, bronze medalist(s)	Stanford	198
4	Boston College	214
5	Georgetown	247
6	Arizona State	266
7	Yale	285
8	Wisconsin	298
9	Providence	310
10	Kansas State	325

=== Women's Individual Result (Top 10) ===
Rank	Name	Team	Time
1st place, gold medalist(s)	(United States) Kara Grgas-Wheeler	Colorado	20:30.5
2nd place, silver medalist(s)	(United States) Sabrina Monroe	Montana	20:37.8
3rd place, bronze medalist(s)	(United States) Erica Palmer	Wisconsin	20:39.9
4	(United States) Shalane Flanagan	North Carolina	20:42.7
5	(United States) Lisa Aguilera	Arizona State	20:46.3
6	(United States) Amy Mortimer	Kansas State	20:50.1
7	(United States) Sheela Agrawal	Duke	20:50.4
8	(United States) Sara Gorton	Colorado	20:51.3
9	(United States) Bethany Brewster	Wisconsin	20:53.3
10	(United States) Larissa Kleinmann	Arkansas	20:54.0
