= Eastern Michigan Eagles men's cross country =

Men's cross country team of Eastern Michigan University

- Founded: 1911; 115 years ago
- University: Eastern Michigan University
- Head coach: Austin Whitelaw
- Conference: MAC
- Location: Ypsilanti, Michigan, US
- Nickname: Eagles
- Colors: Green and white

National championships
- 1970 (NCAA Division II), 1970 (NAIA), 1967 (NAIA), 1966 (NAIA)

NCAA Championship appearances
- 2002

Conference champions
- 1973, 1974, 1986, 1990, 1991, 1992, 1993, 1994, 2000, 2001, 2005, 2006, 2007, 2008, 2010, 2011, 2012, 2013, 2014, 2015, 2016, 2017, 2019, 2020, 2021

Eastern Michigan Eagles men's cross country is a varsity level sport at Eastern Michigan University. The Eagles compete at the Division I level in the NCAA, but previously have been in the NAIA as well as Division II and III of the NCAA. The team is a member of the Mid-American Conference (MAC), where it has won twenty-five team championships.

== Coaching staff ==
=== Early years ===
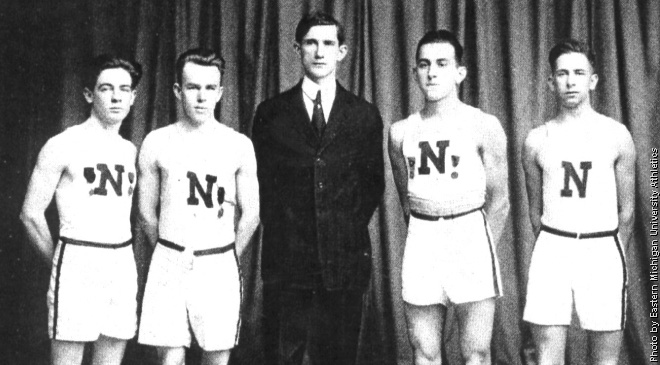
Cross country team of 1911

Michigan Normal College started a four-man cross country team coached by F. G. Beyerman in 1911. In 1923, Michigan State Normal College became a varsity level sport. The team was coached by the former club athlete, Lloyd Olds. 1929 was the year that Michigan State Normal College had a national champion in the form of Roger Arnett. He won the National AAU Junior Six Mile Cross Country race with a time of 31:33. Teammates Ed Morcombe, Jim O'Connor and Harold Bauer finished third, fourth and fifth respectively. Head coach Lloyd Olds coached for the 1932 Olympic team. His assistant coach George Marshall filled in, and won Michigan State Normal College's seventh straight championship. In 1938, Tom Quinn became the school's first NCAA Division I All-American. Notre Dame delivered the team's first dual meet loss in 1941. This ended a 65-dual meet win streak. This record stands as NCAA's longest streak. Former assistant coach George Marshall officially became the schools second head coach in 1942. MSNC were National Junior AAU champions in 1954. In 1955 Michigan State Normal College changed its name to Eastern Michigan College, then changed it to Eastern Michigan University in 1959. EMU joins the National Association of Intercollegiate Athletics, NAIA, in 1966, and won their first NAIA title.

=== Lloyd Olds (1921–1963) ===
Olds worked with the Michigan State Normal College track and cross country teams for 25 years. His reputation as an outstanding coach was known throughout the country. Olds developed the Normal School track and field and cross country program into a national power. His cross country squads attained an astounding 926 winning percentage, the highest ever at EMU and one of the highest ever in the country. By the late 1930s, the Michigan State Normal College was known as a track and cross country school. Coach Olds is the sole EMU coach to coach an Olympic team. In 1932 and 1936 Olds was named as assistant track coach to the U. S. Olympic Track and Field Squads. Olds served as chairman of the A.A. U. Track and Field Sections from 1940 to 1943. He was also chairman of the National Track and Field Association from 1946 to 1950. In 1937 he was appointed chairman of the Pan American Athletic Association and later served as manager of the U. S. Pan American Track Squad that competed in Mexico City in 1957, the only EMU coach to serve on an Olympic and Pan American Games teams. While coaching cross country and track and field full-time, Olds taught over thirty different courses in the professional preparation program during his thirty nine years at Eastern. When he retired in 1963 he was still an active member of nineteen professional committees. In addition to the honors already mentioned, Olds received the Eastern Michigan University Distinguished Alumni Award, and was elected to both the N.C.A.A. Track and Field Hall of Fame and the Eastern Michigan University Sports Hall of Fame. In 2004, he was admitted into the Eastern Michigan University College of Education Hall of Fame.

=== George W. Marshall (1928–1967) ===
Served as the track and cross country coach for 35 years. Marshall directed EMU's only national cross country national championship, the 1966 NAIA national cross country title. Also led the team to a runner-up finish in the 1965 NCAA-College Division championships. His teams won 14 Interstate Intercollegiate Conference (CCC) championships, still the highest number of championships ever by an EMU coach. Marshall was inducted into the NAIA Hall of Fame in 1968. Eastern's outdoor track named in his honor. Marshall was President of the National Cross Country Coaches' Association in 1951. Prior to his passing in 1967, Marshall hired legendary cross country and track and field coach, Bob Parks.

=== Bob Parks (1967–2000) ===
Bob Parks took over as head coach in 1967. In the following five years, each of his teams qualified to either an NAIA Championship meet or NCAA Division II Championship meet. During his first ten seasons at EMU, Parks' teams qualified for the National Championship meet nine times at either NCAA Division I, II or NAIA. In 1972 Eastern Michigan joined the Mid-American Conference and NCAA Division I levels, and transformed the program into a national and conference powerhouse. His star runner early in his career, Gordon Minty, garnered three NCAA Division I All-American honors and Minty gave world-renowned running legend, Steven Prefontaine, a run for his money at the NCAA national championships despite Minty slipping at the start of the race. Parks last recruit, Boaz Cheboiywo, won the NCAA Division I national championship title the year following Parks retirement. Coach Parks is the only EMU cross country coach to coach a long distance Olympian, Dave Ellis, who was in the 1968 Olympics, 10,000m, team Canada. Two of Parks athletes were USA Olympic team members, (800 meter Bronze medalist, 1984, Earl Jones and 1996 1500 meter runner, Paul McMullen) though middle distance runners, both were big contributors on EMU cross country teams. From 1972-2000, Parks coached 11 MAC cross country champions, the most ever by an EMU coach. Parks coached in the Mid-American Conference during its most competitive era from 1967-2000 when all the schools in the MAC conference competed year-around in cross country, indoor track and outdoor track. He watched the league grow to twelve teams but still managed an incredible nine league championships. By mid-2000-2015, the following Mid American Conference schools had either dropped track and field and cross country completely (Western Michigan University, Ohio, Marshall, Bowling Green, Toledo, Miami, Buffalo and Ball State) either leaving the conference or opting to field only cross teams and dropping the sports of indoor or outdoor track and field teams. This attrition of dropped programs, left the MAC cross country league with only four - five, three season running squads, a shadow of the powerful conference. Bob Parks won nine MAC cross country championships, in an era when 100% of Mac school teams participated year around in cross country, indoor and outdoor track. The combination of Parks nine MAC Conference cross country championships, setting the EMU cross country dual meet record and consistently taking his teams to national championships during the Mac Conference most competitive era, is why Parks s referred to as the EMU coaching legend. Parks has been honored with five different hall of fame inductions...Howell high school, Mid-American Conference, Drake Relays, Eastern Michigan University, and the USTFCCCA.

=== John Goodridge (2001–2020) ===
John Goodridge is a track and field and cross country coach from Long Island, New York. He received his undergraduate degree at Long Island University in 1972, and his graduate degree from the University of Michigan in 1975. His coaching career began as the Michigan State women's cross country head coach, where he took them to their first Big Ten Conference championship. In 1984 he became Wake Forest's Head Cross Country Coach. During his stint at Wake Forest, his teams had four Atlantic Coast Conference championships, as well as coaching 19 athletes to 35 All-ACC honors. In 2001, Goodridge took over as head coach at EMU. In 2002, he took the team to NCAA championships where they placed third.

=== Sue Parks (2020) ===
In the fall of 2020, Sue Parks took over as Director of Track & Field/Cross Country at Eastern Michigan. She coached the men's team to the 2020 MAC cross country title.

=== Mark Rinker (2021-2024) ===
Mark Rinker is a track and field and cross country coach from Virginia. Rinker's 2021 cross country team won the MAC XC title. Rinker's teams have finished 3rd in 2022 and 5th in 2023.

=== Austin Whitelaw (2024-present) ===
In August 2024, Austin Whitelaw was tabbed as the Eastern Michigan Head Men's Cross Country Coach, the 8th in program history. During his first season, the program finished 3rd at the MAC Championships. The team fell to 6th at the MAC Championships in 2025.
