= Forest Akers Golf Courses =

Golf course

Coordinates: 42°42′29.9″N 84°29′37.8″W

The Forest Akers Golf Courses are two golf courses located on the campus of Michigan State University in East Lansing, Michigan. Both the East and West courses are open to the public and are made in 18-hole championship style. The men's and women's Michigan State Spartans golf teams are resident there. The West course was redesigned by golf course architect Arthur Hills – an alumnus of Michigan State. The East course was redesigned in 1997. The courses also contain a golf center for practice.

The courses were rated four star by Golf Digest in 1999. The courses are named after Forest Akers, an alumnus of who donated the land to the institution. A condition of the donation was that the course also had to serve as an arboretum and as a result it hosts a variety of plant life native to Michigan. It is the only golf course to feature an arboretum. The original course was designed by W. Bruce Matthews. The West course was opened in 1958. The West Course is the most challenging of the two, and the East course is a par-72 course since its redesign in 1997.

Given the quality of the courses, it has served as the venue for college championships included the NCAA regionals, Big Ten Conference Championships and the Western Junior Championships. In addition to golf, the courses served as the venue for the NCAA Men's Division I Cross Country Championships during its early history. Indeed, it was the only location used for the championship for the first 25 editions that it was held.
