= Michigan State Spartans cross country =

Sports team

Michigan State Spartans have for over a century fielded cross country running teams representing Michigan State University.

== Men's teams ==
Cross Country, first run as an intramural competition in 1907 and as an intercollegiate competition in 1910, has historically been Michigan State's most successful men's sport; especially during a four-decade period spanning roughly 1930-1970 during which the Spartans won eight NCAA championships and numerous IC4A and Big Ten titles. Having outgrown the MIAA, then Michigan Agricultural College initially ran cross country as an independent.

Between WWI and WWII, Michigan State College competed in the Central Collegiate Conference, winning titles in 1926-1929, 1932, 1933, and 1935. Michigan State also experienced success in the IC4A, at New York's Van Cortlandt Park, winning 15 team titles (1933–1937, 1949, 1953, 1956–1960, 1962, 1963, and 1968). Since entering the Big Ten in 1950, Michigan State has won 14 men's team titles (1951–1953, 1955–1960, 1962, 1963, 1968, 1970 and 1971). Michigan State hosted the inaugural NCAA cross country championships in 1938 and every year thereafter through 1964 (there was no championship in 1943). The Spartans won NCAA championships in 1939, 1948, 1949, 1952, 1955, 1956, 1958, and 1959. The following coaches led Michigan State to major titles: CCC (Morton Mason, Lauren Brown), IC4A (Lauren Brown, Karl Schlademan, Fran Dittrich, Jim Gibbard), Big Ten (Karl Schlademan, Fran Dittrich, Jim Gibbard), and NCAA (Lauren Brown, Karl Schlademan, Fran Dittrich).

== Men's individual champions ==
Individual champions include: CCC (Lauren Brown 1927, 1929; Clark Chamberlain 1930, 1931; and Tom Ottey 1932, 1933); IC4A (Clark Chamberlain 1930; Tom Ottey 1933, 1934; Ed Bechtold 1935; Ken Waite 1936; Henry Kennedy 1955, 1956; and Crawford Kennedy 1957-1959); Big Ten (Henry Kennedy 1955, 1956; Crawford Kennedy 1959; and Gerald Young 1960). Athletes who ran cross country at Michigan State and also made Olympic rosters in various events include Tom Ottey (USA), Warren Druetzler (USA), Lyle Garbe (Canada), and David Lean (Australia).

In addition to champions listed previously, the following MSU athletes achieved All-American status at the NCAA championship (those listed are unofficial prior to the award's creation in 1948, but based on the same criteria):

- Dick Frey (1938, 1939)
- Roy Fehr (1939)
- Ralph Monroe (1941)
- Walter Mack (1941, 1945)
- Robert Price (1944)
- Walter Kalmbach (1944)
- Jack Dianetti (1946, official 1948)
- William Mack (1948, 1949)
- Warren Druetzler (1948–1950)
- Don Makielski (1949, 1950)
- Jim Kepford (1950, 1952)
- Wayne Scott (1951, 1952)
- Ron Barr (1951)
- John Walter (1952)
- Lyle Garbe (1953)
- Gaylord Denslow (1955, 1956)
- Terry Block (1955)
- Selwyn Jones (1955, 1956)
- Henry Kennedy (1955, 1956)
- Ron Wheeler (1956)
- Crawford Kennedy (1957–1959)
- Robert Lake (1958)
- William Reynolds (1958–1960)
- Gerald Young (1959, 1960)
- Richard Sharkey (1963)
- Ken Lenowicz (1968)
- Ken Popejoy (1970)
- Herb Lindsay (1974, 1976)
- Anthony Hamm (1988–1991)
- Ian Smith (1991)
- Kyle Baker (1997)

== Women's teams and individual champions ==
Women's cross country competition commenced in 1974 as a club sport and gained varsity status in 1975. Michigan State won Big Ten championships in 1981 (coach John Goodrich), 2001 (coach Jim Stintzi), 2010, 2011, and 2019 (coach Walter Drenth)and finished in the top 15 at the NCAA championship nine times (1981, 1999, 2001, 2002, 2004, 2006, 2007, 2008, and 2019), making this decade tops in the history of the program. Michigan State won the NCAA Championship in 2015 at Terre Haute. The MSU women have also qualified as a team for the NCAA championships for 19 straight seasons dating from 2001 through the 2019 season. Individual Big Ten champions include Misty Allison (1991), Michelle Carson (2002), Danette Doetzel (2004), Nicole Bush (2008), and Emily MacLeod (2010).

In addition to champions listed previously, the following MSU athletes achieved All-American status at the NCAA championship:

- Anne Pewe (1981)
- Jill Washburn (1981)
- Karen Campbell-Lutzke (1981)
- Mary Shea (1988)
- Misty Allison (1991)
- Stephanie Dueringer (1996)
- Ann Sommerville (2000)
- Michelle Carson (2002, 2003)
- Danette Doetzel (2004)
- Alissa McKaig (2006)
- Michelle Rafferty (2006)
- Nicole Bush (2007, 2008)
- Lisa Senakiewich (2008)
