= Oklahoma State Cowboys cross country =

- University: Oklahoma State University
- Head coach: Dave Smith (16th season)
- Conference: Big 12
- Location: Stillwater, Oklahoma, US
- Nickname: Cowboys
- Colors: Orange and black

Men's national championships
- 1954, 2009, 2010, 2012, 2023, 2025

Men's NCAA appearances
- 1939, 1954, 1965, 1966, 1970, 1972, 1973, 1993, 1994, 1995, 1996, 1997, 1998, 1999, 2000, 2001, 2003, 2004, 2005, 2006, 2007, 2008, 2009, 2010, 2011, 2012, 2013, 2014, 2015, 2016, 2017, 2018, 2020, 2021, 2022, 2023, 2024, 2025, 2026

Men's conference champions
- 1960, 1972, 1973, 1995, 2008, 2009, 2010, 2011, 2012, 2013, 2014, 2015, 2016, 2020, 2021, 2022, 2023, 2025

The Oklahoma State Cowboys cross country team is the men's cross country team of Oklahoma State University in Stillwater, Oklahoma. The Cowboys compete in the Big 12 Conference at the Division I level in the NCAA and are currently led by 16th year head coach, Dave Smith.

The Oklahoma State men's cross country program is one of the most decorated in the country, having won six national championships and finishing runner up twice. The Cowboys have also won 18 conference titles, most recently winning the Big 12 in 2025.

== History ==
The Oklahoma State men's cross country program first began in 1917, under the leadership of Ed Gallagher. The team cycled through head coaches with limited success until hiring Ralph Higgins in 1935. Under Higgins, the Cowboys would make their first NCAA Cross Country Championship appearance in 1939, where they would finish 5th. When they made their return 15 years later, they made it count, winning the 1954 national championship in a dominant performance, beating runner–up Syracuse by over 50 points.

Throughout the rest of the century and into the 2000s, the Cowboy cross country team would maintain reasonable success, winning a handful of Big Eight conference titles and making numerous NCAA championship appearances, but they struggled at posing to be a national championship threat against the likes of Arkansas, Oregon and Stanford, until Dave Smith's hiring in 2006.

The hiring of Dave Smith instantly elevated Oklahoma State into being one of the best cross country teams in the country. The Cowboys won their first conference championship in 13 years in 2008, when Smith led the team to their first Big 12 conference title. One year later, Oklahoma State finally won their second national title, winning the 2009 national championship over Oregon. The Cowboys immediately won their third national title in 2010, blowing out runner-up Florida State by 120 points. After a 2nd–place finish in 2011, Oklahoma State won their third national title in four years in 2012, the school's 4th national championship overall. During this time, they dominated the Big 12, winning nine straight conference championships from 2008–16. The Cowboys resumed their dominance in 2020, winning another four straight conference titles from 2020–23 and claiming the school's fifth national championship in 2023, beating the powerhouse Northern Arizona team, 49–71. Oklahoma State would return to the peak just two years later, defeating runner-up New Mexico by 25 points to win the program's sixth national championship in 2025.

== NCAA Championship results ==
Men's Championship Results

Year	Points	Place
1939	114	5th
1954	61	1st
1965	185	5th
1966	378	17th
1970	431	14th
1972	226	7th
1973	194	5th
1993	381	17th
1994	286	11th
1995	150	3rd
1996	158	4th
1997	346	14th
1998	387	14th
1999	419	16th
2000	434	13th
2001	729	31st
2003	433	16th
2004	621	30th
2005	355	8th
2006	356	10th
2007	180	3rd
2008	305	8th
2009	127	1st
2010	73	1st
2011	139	2nd
2012	72	1st
2013	230	3rd
2014	296	9th
2015	450	18th
2016	383	12th
2017	637	29th
2018	378	13th
2020	142	3rd
2021	186	3rd
2022	83	2nd
2023	49	1st
2024	256	8th
2025	57	1st
2026	240	7th

== Honors ==
=== All–Americans ===
40 Cowboy runners have received a total of 70 All-American honors, including three runners (Tom Farrell from 2010–13, Isai Rodriguez in 2018 and from 2020–22 and Victor Shitsama from 2020–23) being four–time All-American recipients.

=== Conference champions ===
11 Cowboy runners have won a total of 15 individual conference championships. John Halberstadt won two Big Eight conference titles in 1972 and 1973, German Fernandez won two Big 12 conference titles in 2008 and 2011, and Brian Musau has won the three most recent Big 12 conference titles in 2023, 2024 and 2025.

== Greiner Family OSU Cross Country Course ==
The Greiner Family OSU Cross Country Course was unveiled in summer of 2019, and features multiple different length configurations depending on the individual runner. The course, located on the Oklahoma State campus, consists of just under one million square feet of Astro Bermuda grass and is carved through wooded areas and prairie with varying elevations.

One of the best cross country courses in the nation, the course was selected to host the 2020 and 2022 NCAA Championships, along with the 2021 and 2026 Big 12 Championships. In October 2024, it was announced that the course will again be hosting the NCAA Championships, this time in 2027.

== See also ==
- Oklahoma State Cowboys and Cowgirls
- Oklahoma State Cowgirls cross country
