= BYU Cougars men's cross country =

American college cross country team

- University: Brigham Young University
- Athletic director: Brian Santiago
- Head coach: Ed Eyestone (since 2000 season)
- Conference: Big 12
- Location: Provo, Utah, US
- Course: Lakeside Sports Complex
- Nickname: Cougars
- Colors: Blue and white

National championships
- 2019, 2024

NCAA Championship appearances
- 1965, 1967, 1970, 1972, 1974, 1975, 1976, 1977, 1984, 1985, 1989, 1993, 1995, 1999-2024

Conference champions
- 1964, 1967, 1971, 1972, 1984, 1985, 1989, 1990, 1993, 1995, 1997, 1998, 1999, 2000, 2001, 2002, 2004, 2005, 2006, 2007, 2008, 2011, 2013, 2015, 2016, 2017, 2018, 2019, 2020, 2021, 2022, 2024

The BYU Cougars men's cross country is the men's college cross country program representing Brigham Young University (BYU) in Provo, Utah. The Cougars began competing in 1961, and have won 32 conference championships and 2 national championships (2019 and 2024). BYU competes in the Big 12 Conference.

== History ==
Cross country originated at BYU as an informal competition, technically classified as a long distance running event for the track and field team. Clarence Robison, an experienced collegiate and Olympic long distance runner, became the track and field coach in 1950. Robison's experience and interest in long distance running led to the growing popularity of cross country both in track and field and as its own sport. Competitions in cross country were often held jointly with the track and field team. In 1962, Sherald James, who had competed as part of the BYU track team, was added to the track and field coaching staff, with his primary responsibility being the cross country team. He helped cultivate the popularity of the program and cross country as an event in track and field. From 1962 to 1998, the Cougars were led by James as they completed in the Western Athletic Conference, where the Cougars won 12 conference championships, and Ed Eyestone won an individual NCAA championship in 1984 with a time of 29:28.8. Starting in 1999, the Cougars competed in the Mountain West Conference.

In 2000, Ed Eyestone became the program's head coach. In 2006, Josh Rohatinsky won the individual NCAA title with a time of 30:44.9. Starting with the 2011 season, the Cougars switched to the West Coast Conference. In 2019, the Cougars were ranked 3rd entering NCAA championships, but defeated #1 NAU, the pre-meet favorites, 109 to 163. BYU's Conner Mantz was third overall, while Danny Carney and Jacob Heslington both earned All-American honors, finishing 17th and 21st respectively. In 2023, BYU's first season as part of the Big 12 Conference, the Cougars placed second at the Big 12 Championship, and third at nationals, behind NAU and the Oklahoma State Cowboys. BYU's top runners were James Corrigan and Kenneth Rooks, who placed 32nd and 35th respectively. In 2024, #2 BYU defeated #1 Oklahoma State 41 to 52 to win their first ever men's Big 12 Conference title in any sport. They went on to defeat Iowa State to claim their second national title.

== Athletes ==
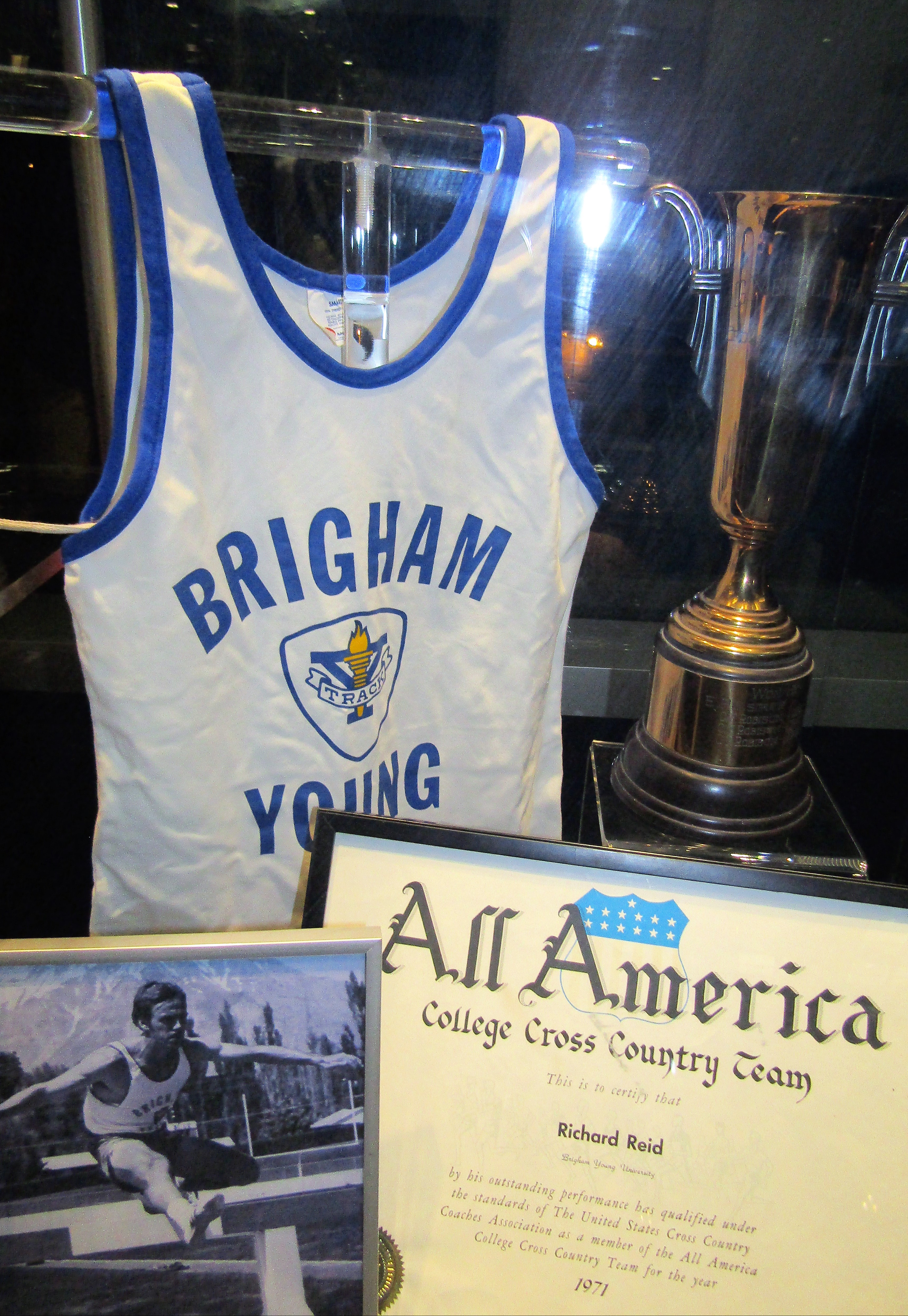
BYU jersey of 1971 All-American Richard Reid

BYU's men's cross country program has produced 39 All-Americans, including one five-time awardee (Casey Clinger) and one four-time awardee (Conner Mantz).

Three of its athletes have won individual national championships: Ed Eyestone (1984), Josh Rohatinsky (2006), and Conner Mantz (2020, 2021).

Several athletes have gone on to complete professionally, and 14 have competed in the Olympic Games, including four-time gold medalist Lasse Virén and one-time gold medalist Pekka Vasala.

== Results by season ==
Statistics overview
Year	Coach	Conference	National
Sherald James (Western Athletic Conference) (1962-1998)
1962	Sherald James	2nd	—
1963	Sherald James	6th	—
1964	Sherald James	1st	5th
1965	Sherald James	2nd	12th
1966	Sherald James	5th	—
1967	Sherald James	1st	19th
1968	Sherald James	5th	—
1969	Sherald James	2nd	—
1970	Sherald James	2nd	16th
1971	Sherald James	1st	—
1972	Sherald James	1st	8th
1973	Sherald James	2nd	—
1974	Sherald James	2nd	13th
1975	Sherald James	2nd	7th
1976	Sherald James	2nd	4th
1977	Sherald James	3rd	5th
1978	Sherald James	4th	—
1979	Sherald James	3rd	—
1980	Sherald James	2nd	—
1981	Sherald James	3rd	—
1982	Sherald James	2nd	—
1983	Sherald James	2nd	—
1984	Sherald James	1st	—
1985	Sherald James	1st	9th
1986	Sherald James	2nd	—
1987	Sherald James	2nd	—
1988	Sherald James	2nd	—
1989	Sherald James	1st	11th
1990	Sherald James	1st	—
1991	Sherald James	2nd	—
1992	Sherald James	2nd	—
1993	Sherald James	1st	2nd
1994	Sherald James	2nd	—
1995	Sherald James	1st	10th
1996	Sherald James	2nd	—
1997	Sherald James	1st	—
1998	Sherald James	1st	—
Sherald James (Mountain West Conference) (1999)
1999	Sherald James	30th	—
Ed Eystone (Mountain West Conference) (2000-2010)
2000	Ed Eystone	1st	23rd
2001	Ed Eystone	1st	12th
2002	Ed Eystone	1st	16th
2003	Ed Eystone	2nd	19th
2004	Ed Eystone	1st	5th
2005	Ed Eystone	1st	13th
2006	Ed Eystone	1st	11th
2007	Ed Eystone	1st	22nd
2008	Ed Eystone	1st	9th
2009	Ed Eystone	2nd	17th
2010	Ed Eystone	2nd	18th
Ed Eystone (West Coast Conference) (2011-2022)
2011	Ed Eystone	1st	4th
2012	Ed Eystone	2nd	6th
2013	Ed Eystone	1st	4th
2014	Ed Eystone	2nd	16th
2015	Ed Eystone	1st	12th
2016	Ed Eystone	1st	7th
2017	Ed Eystone	1st	3rd
2018	Ed Eystone	1st	2nd
2019	Ed Eystone	1st	1st
2020	Ed Eystone	1st	7th
2021	Ed Eystone	1st	7th
2022	Ed Eystone	1st	3rd
Ed Eystone (Big 12 Conference) (2023-present)
2023	Ed Eystone	1st	3rd
2024	Ed Eystone	1st	1st
2025	Ed Eystone	4th	11th
National champion Conference champion
