= Tennessee Volunteers men's cross country =

Tennessee Volunteers cross country
- Founded: 1924
- University: University of Tennessee
- Athletic director: Danny White
- Head coach: Sean Carlson (1st season)
- Conference: SEC
- Location: Knoxville, TN
- Course: Cherokee Farm Cross Country Course
- Nickname: Volunteers
- Colors: Orange and white

National championships
- 1972

NCAA Championship appearances
- 1951, 1963, 1964, 1965, 1966, 1967, 1968, 1969, 1971, 1972, 1973, 1975, 1976, 1977, 1978, 1980, 1981, 1982, 1983, 1984, 1985, 1986, 1988, 1989, 1990, 1991, 1993, 1994, 1995, 1998, 2001, 2002, 2005, 2022, 2023

NCAA regional appearances
- 1965, 1966, 1967, 1968, 1969, 1970, 1971, 1972, 1973, 1974, 1975, 1976, 1977, 1978, 1979, 1980, 1981, 1982, 1983, 1984, 1985, 1986, 1987, 1988, 1989, 1990, 1991, 1992, 1993, 1994, 1995, 1996, 1997, 1998, 1999, 2000, 2001, 2002, 2003, 2004, 2005, 2006, 2007, 2008, 2009, 2010, 2011, 2012, 2013, 2014, 2015, 2016, 2017, 2018, 2019, 2021, 2022, 2023

Conference champions
- 1949, 1950, 1951, 1952, 1956, 1963, 1965, 1966, 1967, 1968, 1969, 1971, 1972, 1974, 1975, 1976, 1977, 1978, 1981, 1982, 1983, 1984, 1985, 1989, 1990

The Tennessee Volunteers cross country program represents the University of Tennessee located in Knoxville, Tennessee. The men's program competes in the National Collegiate Athletic Association (NCAA) Division I and the Southeastern Conference (SEC). The men's cross country team officially started in 1924.

== Coaching staff ==
Entering the 2011-2012 school year, George Watts had been head coach of University of Tennessee cross country team for 26 years. Under his mentor he has developed 25 All-SEC citations, 13 All-SEC or All-South Region, three SEC All-Freshman honorees and three All-America performers. In July 2011 it was announced that Watts had been released and that J.J. Clark would take over the men's cross country team effectively merging all of Tennessee's track & field and cross country programs. J.J. Clark was highly unsuccessful as he never guided the team above a 5th place SEC finish or a trip to the NCAA Championships.

In May 2014, it was announced by Athletic Director Dave Hart that Director of Track and Field/Cross Country JJ Clark would not be retained. Later, in June 2014, it was announced that Beth Alford-Sullivan would be the next Director of Track and Field/Cross Country at the University of Tennessee. This hire made her the first female SEC coach of any men's team. Tennessee's NCAA Championship drought and struggles in SEC play continued under Alford-Sullivan's tenure until she was fired in May 2022.

Former Notre Dame coach Sean Carlson was hired to lead the men's and women's cross country teams and the distance runners. In Carlson's first year as head coach, he led them to their best finish (2nd) at the SEC Championships since 1999, their first NCAA South Regional title since 2002 (where they outperformed SEC Champion Alabama by 34 points), and returned the Vols to the NCAA Championships for the first time since 2005, where they finished 20th. Following a second South Regional title and return to the NCAA Championships in 2023, Carlson was named the USTFCCCA South Region men's coach of the year.

== Team history ==
The Tennessee Volunteers program began competing in 1924. It was not until 1962 that the team gained its first coach, Chuck Rohe. Under his guidance the Vols reached new heights winning multiple SEC regular season and tournament championships. Under his guidance the Vols reached their first NCAA Tournament appearance in 1963 where they finished 5th, he would then lead the team to four more NCAA appearances until he left the team in 1968. The team found more success with the hire of Stan Huntsman who led UT to many trips to the NCAA Tournament and won the Volunteers their first and only national title. From 1962-2009 the team has amassed a 201-38-1 record in team dual meets earning them a .840 winning percentage.

== Home courses ==
The Lambert Acres Golf Club was previously the site of home cross country meets for the Volunteers from 1998-2013. The course still serves as a 27-hole golf course, and is nestled in the foothills of the Great Smoky Mountains and boasts 9,525 yards. Throughout its run, the course hosted the Tennessee Invitational 10 times, the NCAA South Regional in 2002, 2006 and 2008, and Southeastern Conference Championship in 1998. In 2014, the Vols moved much closer to home with the opening of the new Cherokee Farm Cross Country Course on Alcoa highway across the Tennessee River from the main UT campus. The course served as the practice venue for the team in 2014 and 2015, before finally serving in competition for the 2016 season. The course has two loops, one that is 2k and the other is 1k. The course was designed specifically for viewers to use the small loop, where it is ensured that runners have to pass the same point at least three times in a race.

== Year-by-Year results ==
*Through November 11, 2022.
*Note: records from 1924-1961 are inaccurate

Year-by-Year Results
Year	Head Coach	Conference Meet	NCAA Regional	NCAA Meet
Southern Conference
1924-1928 Records Incomplete
1929	–	T–4th	–	–
1930	–	T–5th	–	–
1931	–	3rd (100)	–	–
1932	–	4th (125)	–	–
Southeastern Conference
1933-1945 Records Incomplete
1946	–	2nd (44)	–	–
1947	–	2nd (73)	–	–
1948	–	4th (79)	–	–
1949	–	1st (48)	–	–
1950	–	1st (30)	–	–
1951	–	1st (18)	–	6th (195)
1952	–	1st (30)	–	–
1953	–	5th (125)	–	–
1954	–	2nd (46)	–	–
1955	–	4th (79)	–	–
1956	–	1st (26)	–	–
1957 Records Incomplete
1958	–	3rd (94)	–	–
1959	–	4th (94)	–	–
1960-1961 Records Incomplete
1962	Chuck Rohe	5th (114)	–	–
1963	Chuck Rohe	1st (15)	–	–
1964	Chuck Rohe	–	–	11th (290)
1965	Chuck Rohe	1st (15)	1st (22)	3rd (137)
1966	Chuck Rohe	1st (39)	2nd (50)	24th (519)
1967	Chuck Rohe	1st (28)	2nd (50)	12th (286)
1968	Chuck Rohe	1st (30)	1st (37)	17th (360)
1969	Connie Smith	1st (34)	3rd (102)	18th (445)
1970	Connie Smith	3rd (47)	2nd (68)	–
1971	Stan Huntsman	1st (48)	4th (93)	21st (478)
1972	Stan Huntsman	1st (35)	4th (123)	1st (134)
1973	Stan Huntsman	2nd (47)	3rd (98)	13th (286)
1974	Stan Huntsman	1st (44)	8th (145)	–
1975	Stan Huntsman	1st (38)	1st (53)	16th (381)
1976	Stan Huntsman	1st (32)	1st (62)	6th (280)
1977	Stan Huntsman	1st (23)	2nd (75)	8th (260)
1978	Stan Huntsman	1st (24)	1st (35)	6th (247)
1979	Stan Huntsman	4th (89)	9th (248)	–
1980	Stan Huntsman	2nd (64)	5th (153)	18th (457)
1981	Stan Huntsman	1st (38)	2nd (91)	19th (417)
1982	Stan Huntsman	1st (47)	4th (141)	13th (302)
1983	Stan Huntsman	1st (31)	4th (130)	10th (291)
1984	Stan Huntsman	1st (38)	2nd (98)	3rd (144)
1985	Doug Brown	1st (44)	2nd (109)	13th (345)
1986	Doug Brown	2nd (46)	2nd (123)	14th (329)
1987	Doug Brown	2nd (63)	4th (157)	–
1988	Doug Brown	2nd (39)	1st (85)	3rd (177)
1989	Doug Brown	1st (57)	2nd (130)	17th (353)
1990	Doug Brown	1st (52)	2nd (111)	7th (235)
1991	Doug Brown	2nd (88)	4th (167)	21st (420)
1992	Doug Brown	2nd (96)	10th (299)	–
1993	Doug Brown	2nd (75)	3rd (144)	18th (409)
1994	Doug Brown	2nd (42)	T–1st (133)	12th (294)
1995	George Watts	2nd (58)	1st (61)	12th (272)
1996	George Watts	3rd (92)	5th (178)	–
1997	George Watts	5th (124)	4th (164)	–
1998	George Watts	2nd (63)	2nd (92)	T–21st (501)
1999	George Watts	2nd (59)	3rd (113)	–
2000	George Watts	7th (163)	5th (139)	–
2001	George Watts	3rd (92)	2nd (84)	30th (722)
2002	George Watts	4th (105)	1st (51)	31st (647)
2003	George Watts	6th (141)	4th (125)	–
2004	George Watts	5th (124)	6th (160)	–
2005	George Watts	4th (93)	4th (100)	28th (604)
2006	George Watts	4th (121)	4th (108)	–
2007	George Watts	4th (102)	8th (178)	–
2008	George Watts	5th (130)	5th (156)	–
2009	George Watts	6th (142)	6th (178)	–
2010	George Watts	4th (132)	4th (150)	–
2011	J.J. Clark	T–5th (169)	12th (341)	–
2012	J.J. Clark	7th (217)	8th (250)	–
2013	J.J. Clark	7th (187)	5th (181)	–
2014	Beth Alford-Sullivan	7th (205)	10th (262)	–
2015	Beth Alford-Sullivan	11th (301)	T–9th (296)	–
2016	Beth Alford-Sullivan	9th (278)	10th (300)	–
2017	Beth Alford-Sullivan	5th (125)	5th (165)	–
2018	Beth Alford-Sullivan	4th (132)	3rd (108)	–
2019	Beth Alford-Sullivan	9th (221)	12th (320)	–
2020	Beth Alford-Sullivan	4th (123)	N/A	–
2021	Beth Alford-Sullivan	5th (169)	7th (228)	–
2022	Sean Carlson	T–2nd (64)	1st (39)	20th (517)
2023	Sean Carlson	3rd (59)	1st (68)	26th (556)
Total		25	11	1

Note: In 2020, due to COVID-19, the cross country season was shortened, and NCAA regionals were not held, as teams advanced straight to the championships.

=== All-Americans ===
Tennessee has a total of 17 men's cross country All-Americans

- Ron Addison, 1976
- Jamie Barnes, 1991
- Doug Brown, 1972, 1973
- Tony Cosey, 1994, 1995
- Rick Cummins, 1988
- Pat Davey, 1978
- Doug Ellington, 1998
- Stewart Ellington, 1994
- Alf Holmberg, 1951
- David Krafsur, 1985
- Glenn Morgan, 1989, 1990
- Peter Okwera, 2012
- Rickey Pittman, 1981
- Bob Redington, 1965
- Zach Sabatino, 2005
- Doug Tolson, 1983, 1984
- George Watts, 1977
- Todd Williams, 1988, 1989, 1990

== See also ==
- Tennessee men's track and field
- Tennessee women's track and field
- Tennessee women's cross country
