= Texas Longhorns men's cross country =

- Founded: 1920
- University: University of Texas at Austin
- Athletic director: Chris Del Conte
- Head coach: Edrick Floréal (2nd season)
- Conference: SEC
- Location: Austin, TX
- Nickname: Longhorns
- Colors: Burnt Orange and White

NCAA Championship appearances
- 1956, 1957, 1960, 1970, 1980, 1981, 1983, 1984, 1985, 1986, 1987, 1988, 1989, 1990, 1991, 1992, 1993, 1996, 2000, 2001, 2002, 2004, 2005, 2006, 2007, 2009, 2010, 2011, 2012, 2013, 2014, 2015, 2016, 2017, 2018, 2019, 2021, 2023

Conference champions
- SWC; 1920, 1923, 1924, 1930, 1931, 1932, 1933, 1934, 1935, 1936, 1937, 1938, 1939, 1940, 1941, 1942, 1943, 1944, 1945, 1946, 1947, 1954, 1955, 1960, 1963, 1964, 1965, 1967, 1969, 1972, 1973, 1991, 1993

The Texas Longhorns men's cross country team represents the University of Texas at Austin in NCAA Division I intercollegiate men's cross country competition. The Longhorns competed in the Big 12 Conference through the 2024 season and moved to the Southeastern Conference (SEC) on July 1, 2024.

The team was founded in 1920 and has won 33 Southwest Conference championships and has placed as high as third in the NCAA Men's Division I Cross Country Championship. The 1956 individual championship was won by Walter McNew with a time of 19:55.94.

== Yearly Record ==
Season	Head coach	NCAA	Conference
Southwest Conference
1920	Clyde Littlefield		1st
1921	Clyde Littlefield		2nd
1922	Clyde Littlefield		2nd
1923	Clyde Littlefield		1st
1924	Clyde Littlefield		1st
1925	Clyde Littlefield		2nd
1926	Clyde Littlefield		3rd
1927	Clyde Littlefield		3rd
1928	Clyde Littlefield		2nd
1929	Clyde Littlefield		2nd
1930	Clyde Littlefield		1st
1931	Clyde Littlefield		1st
1932	Clyde Littlefield		1st
1933	Clyde Littlefield		T-1st
1934	Clyde Littlefield		1st
1935	Clyde Littlefield		1st
1936	Clyde Littlefield		1st
1937	Clyde Littlefield		1st
1938	Clyde Littlefield		1st
1939	Clyde Littlefield		1st
1940	Clyde Littlefield		1st
1941	Clyde Littlefield		1st
1942	Clyde Littlefield		1st
1943	Clyde Littlefield		1st
1944	Clyde Littlefield		1st
1945	Clyde Littlefield		1st
1946	Clyde Littlefield		1st
1947	Clyde Littlefield		1st
1948	Clyde Littlefield		2nd
1949	Clyde Littlefield		3rd
1950	Clyde Littlefield		3rd
1951	Clyde Littlefield		3rd
1952	Clyde Littlefield		3rd
1953	Clyde Littlefield		2nd
1954	Clyde Littlefield		1st
1955	Clyde Littlefield		1st
1956	Clyde Littlefield	3rd	2nd
1957	Clyde Littlefield	11th	2nd
1958	Clyde Littlefield		3rd
1959	Clyde Littlefield		2nd
1960	Clyde Littlefield	12th	1st
1961	Froggie Lovern		3rd
1962	Froggie Lovern		3rd
1963	Jack Patterson		1st
1964	Jack Patterson		1st
1965	Jack Patterson		1st
1966	Jack Patterson		3rd
1967	Jack Patterson		1st
1968	Jack Patterson		2nd
1969	Jack Patterson		1st
1970	Cleburn Price	30th	2nd
1971	Cleburn Price		2nd
1972	Cleburn Price		1st
1973	Cleburn Price		1st
1974	Cleburn Price		3rd
1975	Cleburn Price		2nd
1976	Cleburn Price		2nd
1977	Cleburn Price		3rd
1978	Cleburn Price		7th
1979	Cleburn Price		7th
1980	Cleburn Price	26th	2nd
1981	Cleburn Price	16th	2nd
1982	Cleburn Price		2nd
1983	Cleburn Price	21st	2nd
1984	Cleburn Price	20th	2nd
1985	Stan Huntsman	14th	2nd
1986	Stan Huntsman	9th	2nd
1987	Stan Huntsman	18th	3rd
1988	Stan Huntsman	12th	2nd
1989	Stan Huntsman	14th	2nd
1990	Stan Huntsman	4th	2nd
1991	Stan Huntsman	7th	1st
1992	Stan Huntsman	22nd	2nd
1993	Stan Huntsman	22nd	1st
1994	Stan Huntsman		2nd
1995	Bubba Thornton		3rd
Big 12 Conference
1996	Bubba Thornton	20th	7th (169)
1997	Bubba Thornton		6th (140)
1998	Bubba Thornton		4th (110)
1999	Bubba Thornton		4th (157)
2000	Bubba Thornton	22nd	4th (141)
2001	Bubba Thornton	28th	6th (138)
2002	Bubba Thornton	T-23rd	2nd (90)
2003	Bubba Thornton		6th (150)
2004	Bubba Thornton	12th	2nd (63)
2005	Bubba Thornton	7th	2nd (52)
2006	Bubba Thornton	7th	2nd (80)
2007	Bubba Thornton	17th	3rd (58)
2008	Bubba Thornton		6th (179)
2009	Bubba Thornton	T-28th	5th (132)
2010	Bubba Thornton	26th	4th (127)
2011	Bubba Thornton	11th	3rd (87)
2012	Bubba Thornton	9th	2nd (56)
2013	Mario Sategna	14th	3rd (80)
2014	Mario Sategna	26th	4th (84)
2015	Mario Sategna	31st	3rd (83)
2016	Mario Sategna	30th	3rd (100)
2017	Tonja Buford-Bailey	30th	2nd (42)
2018	Edrick Floréal	27th	3rd (70)
2019	Edrick Floréal	25th	3rd (72)
2020	Edrick Floréal		3rd (84)
2021	Edrick Floréal	14th	3rd (77)
2022	Edrick Floréal		3rd (59)
2023	Edrick Floréal	7th	3rd (70)
Southeastern Conference
2024	Edrick Floréal		4th (152)
Total		0	SWC: 33; Big 12: 0 SEC: 0

== See also ==
- Texas Longhorns women's cross country
- Texas Longhorns men's track and field
- Texas Longhorns women's track and field
