= Iowa State Cyclones cross country =

- Founded: 1859; 167 years ago
- University: Iowa State
- Head coach: Jeremy Sudbury (6th season)
- Conference: Big 12
- Location: Ames, Iowa, US
- Course: ISU Cross Country Course
- Nickname: Cyclones
- Colors: Cardinal and gold

Men's national championships
- 1989, 1994

Women's national championships
- 1975, 1976, 1977, 1978, 1981

Men's NCAA appearances
- 1958, 1959, 1966, 1974, 1976, 1977, 1980, 1981, 1983, 1984, 1985, 1988, 1989, 1990, 1991, 1992, 1993, 1994, 1995, 1997, 1998, 2007, 2008, 2009, 2016, 2017, 2018, 2019, 2020, 2021, 2023

Women's NCAA appearances
- 1982, 1983, 1985, 1990, 1995, 1996, 2009, 2010, 2011, 2012, 2013, 2014, 2015, 2016, 2017, 2018, 2020, 2021, 2023.

Men's conference champions
- 1911, 1913, 1914, 1915, 1916, 1917, 1919, 1920, 1921, 1922, 1923, 1926, 1930, 1931, 1974, 1981, 1983, 1984, 1987, 1988, 1989, 1990, 1991, 1993, 1994, 2017, 2018, 2019

Women's conference champions
- 1975, 1976, 1977, 1978, 1979 ,1981, 1983, 1990, 2011, 2012, 2013, 2014, 2016, 2017, 2018, 2020

Iowa State Cyclones Cross Country represents Iowa State University (ISU) and competes in the Big 12 Conference of NCAA Division I. The team is coached by Jeremy Sudbury, he is currently in his 6th year at Iowa State as Head Coach and 14th overall. Originally, the men's and women's teams were considered separate; but beginning in the 2007 season the two teams were combined and are now operated as one single sport at the university. The Cyclones host their home meets at the Cross Country Course located on Iowa State's campus.

== History ==
=== Men's team ===
The Iowa State men's cross country team made their first appearance as a team at the national cross country meet in 1952. Between 1952 and 1987, Iowa State produced ten different individual All-Americans, many of them receiving the honors more than once.

In both 1987 and 1988, the men's team won the Big Eight Conference titles. In 1989, the team led by John Nuttall and Jonah Koech won their third consecutive Big Eight Conference championship and continued to the national meet with high hopes. At the NCAA Division 1 National Meet, Nuttall captured the individual crown, followed in second by his teammate Koech. The 1989 Iowa State Cyclone team won their first national championship with the second best team score in the previous 25 years.

For the next two years, Iowa State was the runner-up at the national meet. In 1994, the team, led by Ian Robinson, was once again Big Eight Conference Champions and was expected to contend for the national title. Although the meet was held on the home course of the defending champions, Arkansas, Iowa State captured the national title for the first time since 1989.

Martin Smith was hired in 2013 to replace Corey Ihmels as the new Director of Track & Field / Cross Country. Martin has 35 years of collegiate coaching experience with 5 national championships, 25 conference championships, and nearly 300 All-Americans under his guidance. Martin was hired from Oklahoma, where he led the men's cross country team to their highest finish ever at the 2012 NCAA XC National Championships. Prior to Oklahoma, Smith coached at Oregon where he coached 65 All-Americans. From 1983 - 1998, Smith coached at Wisconsin, where he led the men's cross country team to national championships in 1985 and 1988. Smith coached at Virginia from 1980 - 1983, where he led the women to three national championships (indoor track in 1981 and cross country in 1981 and 1982).

=== Women's team ===
Iowa State first formed a collegiate women's cross country team in 1975. Becoming successful from the start, the team won the 1975 team AIAW Championship. The team was led by Peg Neppel-Darrah, who won the 1975 individual AIAW Championship as well. Iowa State continued to dominate by winning the 1976, 1977, and 1978 titles. The team also won the 1981 AIAW title on the strength of Dorthe Rasmussen's individual title.

The team experienced tragedy when the team plane crashed on the way back from finishing as runner-up at the 1985 NCAA Championships. The university-owned plane crashed over Des Moines due to suspected ice accumulation on the wings. Those aboard were Burton Watkins of Ames, pilot of the airplane; Ron Renko, Head Coach of the ISU women's track and cross country teams; Stephanie Streit, student trainer for the Athletic Department; and cross country team members Susan Baxter, Julie Rose, and Sheryl Maahs.

After the setback, the team didn't return to dominance until the mid-2000s led by distance runner Lisa Koll. While at Iowa State, Koll was a three-time all-American and went on to compete in the 2012 Olympics. Koll's individual success was followed shortly by Betsy Saina's, culminating in an NCAA championship in 2012. She too went on to compete in the Olympics, placing fifth at the 2016 games.

The current women's cross country coach is Laura Harmon.

== Championships ==
=== Men's team championships ===
Titles	Type	Year
National Championships
2	Men's NCAA Team Champions	1989, 1994
2 Total
Conference Championships
25	Big Eight Conference Men's Team Champion	1911, 1913, 1914, 1915, 1916, 1917, 1919, 1920, 1921, 1922, 1923, 1926, 1930, 1931, 1974, 1981, 1983, 1984, 1987, 1988, 1989, 1990, 1991, 1993, 1994
3	Big Ten Conference Men's Team Champion	1911, 1919, 1920
3	Big 12 Conference Men's Team Champion	2017, 2018, 2019
31 Total

=== Women's team championships ===
Titles	Type	Year
National Championships
5	Women's AIAW Team Champions	1975, 1976, 1977, 1978, 1981
2	Women's USF Team Champions	1973, 1974
7 Total
Conference Championships
8	Big Eight Conference Women's Team Champion	1975, 1976, 1977, 1978, 1979, 1981, 1983, 1990
8	Big 12 Conference Women's Team Champion	2011, 2012, 2013, 2014, 2016, 2017, 2018, 2020
16 Total

=== Men's individual NCAA championships ===
Men's Individual NCAA Champions
Year	Name	League
1989	John Nuttall	NCAA
1990	Jonah Koech	NCAA

=== Men's Individual conference champions ===
Men's Individual Conference Champions
Year	Name	Conference
1930	Ray Putnam	Big Six
1983	Yobes Ondieki	Big Eight
1984	Yobes Ondieki	Big Eight
1985	Yobes Ondieki	Big Eight
1987	Barnaba Korir	Big Eight
1988	Barnaba Korir	Big Eight
1989	John Nuttall	Big Eight
1990	Jonah Koech	Big Eight
1991	Jonah Koech	Big Eight
1993	Ian Robinson	Big Eight
1994	Ian Robinson	Big Eight
2018	Edwin Kurgat	Big 12
2019	Edwin Kurgat	Big 12
2020	Wesley Kiptoo	Big 12
2021	Wesley Kiptoo	Big 12

=== Women's individual national championships ===
Women's Individual national Champions
Year	Name	League
1975	Peg Neppel-Darrah	AIAW
1981	Dorth Rasmussen	AIAW
2012	Betsy Saina	NCAA

=== Women's Individual conference champions ===
Women's Individual Conference Champions
Year	Name	Conference
1975	Peg Neppel-Darrah	Big Eight
1976	Carol Cook	Big Eight
1977	Debbie Vetter	Big Eight
1978	Debbie Vetter	Big Eight
1979	Christine McMeekin	Big Eight
1981	Dorthe Rasmussen	Big Eight
2012	Betsy Saina	Big 12
2014	Crystal Nelson	Big 12
2015	Perez Rotich	Big 12
2018	Cailie Logue	Big 12
2019	Cailie Logue	Big 12
2020	Cailie Logue	Big 12

== Record by year ==
=== Men's record by year ===
Men's Record by Year
Year	Conference Finish	Points	NCAA Finish	Points
1928	2nd	59 Pts.		
1929	4th	76 Pts.		
1930	1st	5-0		
1931	1st	5-0		
1932	2nd	40 Pts.		
1933	No Meet			
1934	No Meet			
1935	3rd	80 Pts.		
1936	5th	94 Pts.		
1937	3rd	80 Pts.		
1938	4th	90 Pts.		
1939	4th	53 Pts.		
1940	4th	56 Pts.		
1941	3rd	50 Pts.		
1942	No Meet Due to WWII			
1943	No Meet Due to WWII			
1944	No Meet Due to WWII			
1945	No Meet Due to WWII			
1946	6th	113 Pts.		
1947	5th	50 Pts.		
1948	3rd	51 Pts.		
1949	3rd	59 Pts.		
1950	6th	84 Pts.		
1951	6th	90 Pts.		
1952	6th	69 Pts.		
1953	5th	78 Pts.		
1954	5th	90 Pts.		
1955	4th	69 Pts.		
1956	3rd	93 Pts.		
1957	3rd	84 Pts.		
1958	2nd	92 Pts.	5th	126 Pts.
1959	2nd	92 Pts.	6th	153 Pts.
1960	7th	161 Pts.		
1961	8th	174 Pts.		
1962	8th	198 Pts.		
1963	8th	214 Pts.		
1964	6th	156 Pts.		
1965	6th	149 Pts.		
1966	6th	135 Pts.	23rd	485 Pts.
1967	5th	115 Pts.		
1968	6th	138 Pts.		
1969	7th	152 Pts.		
1970	6th	135 Pts.		
1971	8th	155 Pts.		
1972	8th	202 Pts.		
1973	7th	154 Pts.		
1974	1st	49 Pts.	14th	374 Pts.
1975	3rd	87 Pts.		
1976	5th	126 Pts.	27th	595 Pts.
1977	2nd	74 Pts.	29th	725 Pts.
1978	6th	135 Pts.		
1979	6th	142 Pts.		
1980	2nd	62 Pts.	10th	303 Pts.
1981	1st	33 Pts.	11th	310 Pts.
1982	2nd	81 Pts.		
1983	1st	83 Pts.	8th	269 Pts.
1984	1st	53 Pts.	10th	310 Pts.
1985	4th	78 Pts.	6th	228 Pts.
1986	3rd	68 Pts.		
1987	1st	47 Pts.		
1988	1st	37 Pts.	6th	201 Pts.
1989	1st	22 Pts.	1st	54 Pts.
1990	1st	26 Pts.	2nd	96 Pts.
1991	1st	16 Pts.	2nd	228Pts.
1992	4th	106 Pts.	14th	342 Pts.
1993	1st	27 Pts.	3rd	156 Pts.
1994	1st	29 Pts.	1st	65 Pts.
1995	3rd	64 Pts.	18th	451 Pts.
1996	3rd	95 Pts.		
1997	2nd	86 Pts.	15th	357 Pts.
1998	7th	169 Pts.		
1999	8th	189 Pts.		
2000	7th	185 Pts.		
2001	11th	265 Pts.		
2002	5th	141 Pts.		
2003	11th	282 Pts.		
2004	6th	173 Pts.		
2005	6th	188 Pts.		
2006	5th	114 Pts.		
2007	4th	139 Pts.	T-30th	363 Pts.
2008	3rd	67 Pts.	17th	435 Pts.
2009	4th	139 Pts.	16th	430 Pts.
2010	5th	133 Pts.		
2011	5th	139 Pts.		
2012	5th	137 Pts.		
2013	2nd	77 Pts.		
2014	3rd	80 Pts.		
2015	4th	93 Pts.		
2016	2nd	49 Pts.	16th	384 Pts.
2017	1st	40 Pts.	7th	279 Pts.
2018	1st	32 Pts.	7th	220 Pts.
2019	1st	34 Pts.	4th	211 Pts.
2020	2nd	31 Pts.	8th	265 Pts.
2021	2nd	31 Pts.	2nd	137 Pts.
2022	2nd	57 Pts.		
2023	4th	114 Pts.	5th	230 Pts.

=== Women's record by year ===
Women's Record by Year
Year	Conference Finish	Points	National Finish	Points
1975	1st	20 Pts.	1st	
1976	1st	18 Pts.	1st	62 Pts.
1977	1st	27 Pts.	1st	92 Pts.
1978	1st	43 Pts.	1st	
1979	1st	31 Pts.	9th	
1980	5th	93 Pts.	22nd	
1981	1st	27 Pts.	1st	
1982	2nd	51 Pts.	8th	182 Pts.
1983	1st	44 Pts.	5th	137 Pts.
1984	4th	81 Pts.		
1985	2nd	66 Pts.	2nd	98 Pts.
1986	5th	99 Pts.		
1987	T-3rd	70 Pts.		
1988	3rd	77 Pts.		
1989	7th	163 Pts.		
1990	1st	48 Pts.	T-14th	318 Pts.
1991	6th	114 Pts.		
1992	T-5th	126 Pts.		
1993	8th	226 Pts.		
1994	7th	173 Pts.		
1995	2nd	84 Pts.	20th	478 Pts.
1996	4th	125 Pts.	18th	422 Pts.
1997	8th	199 Pts.		
1998	8th	150 Pts.		
1999	8th	186 Pts.		
2000	6th	161 Pts.		
2001	11th	313 Pts.		
2002	10th	237 Pts.		
2003	11th	310 Pts.		
2004	11th	291 Pts.		
2005	9th	289 Pts.		
2006	9th	247 Pts.		
2007	7th	175 Pts.		
2008	9th	225 Pts.		
2009	3rd	85 Pts.	17th	446 Pts.
2010	3rd	79 Pts.	8th	341 Pts.
2011	1st	68 Pts.	7th	290 Pts.
2012	1st	34 Pts.	11th	350 Pts.
2013	1st	35 Pts.	13th	333 Pts.
2014	1st	27 Pts.	2nd	147 Pts.
2015	2nd	52 Pts.	24th	591 Pts.
2016	1st	56 Pts.	29th	608 Pts.
2017	1st	49 Pts.	20th	508 Pts.
2018	1st	35 Pts.	15th	403 Pts.
2019	4th	77 Pts.		
2020	1st	39 Pts.	25th	580 Pts.
2021	2nd	36 Pts.	9th	332 Pts.
2022	3rd	64 Pts.		
2023	3rd	70 Pts.	20th	458 Pts.

The Association for Intercollegiate Athletics for Women was established in 1971 to govern collegiate women's athletics and to administer national championships. Cross country was one of twelve women's sports added to the NCAA championship program for the 1981–82 school year, as the NCAA engaged in battle with the AIAW for sole governance of women's collegiate sports. The AIAW continued to conduct its established championship program in the same twelve (including cross country) sports; however, after a year of dual women's championships, the NCAA conquered the AIAW and usurped its authority and membership. Iowa State's 1975, 1976, 1977, 1978, and 1981 women's cross country championships were AIAW championships.

== All-Americans ==
=== Men All-Americans ===
Iowa State Men's cross country has had 40 All-Americans since 1975 as well as two NCAA champions in John Nuttall, Jonah Koech in 1989 and 1990 and Edwin Kurgat in 2019 respectively.

Men All-Americans
Year	Name	Place
1959	John Darby	N/A
1969	Dennis McGuire	N/A
1970	Dennis McGuire	N/A
1974	Tom Schoberg	26th
1980	Richard Kaitany	29th
1981	Richard Kaitany	18th
1981	Johnson Sirma	45th
1982	Joseph Kipsang	6th
1983	Yobes Ondieki	2nd
1983	Joseph Kipsang	4th
1984	Tim Wakeland	36th
1984	Yobes Ondieki	3rd
1985	Yobes Ondieki	2nd
1985	Raf Wyns	6th
1987	Barnaba Korir	8th
1988	Barnaba Korir	12th
1988	Darrell Smith	22nd
1989	John Nuttall	1st
1989	Jonah Koech	2nd
1989	Darrell Smith	11th
1990	Jonah Koech	1st
1990	Jon Brown	4th
1991	Jonah Koech	5th
1991	Jon Brown	14th
1993	Jonh Kihonge	13th
1993	Steve Brooks	19th
1993	Corey Ihmels	23rd
1994	Ian Robinson	9th
1994	Dmitry Drozdov	12th
1994	Corey Ihmels	13th
1994	Steve Brooks	17th
1994	John Kihonge	22nd
1995	Dmitry Drozdov	21st
1996	Simeon Wright	35th
1997	Saul Lempirikany	25th
2008	Guar Marial	38th
2013	Mohamed Hrezi	24th
2017	Andrew Jordan	15th
2018	Edwin Kurgat	3rd
2019	Edwin Kurgat	1st
2021	Wesley Kiptoo	3rd
2021	Wesley Kiptoo	2nd
2021	Thomas Pollard	21st
2023	Sanele Masondo	16th
2023	Rodgers Kiplimo	37th

=== Women All-Americans ===
Iowa State Women's cross country has had 36 All-Americans since 1975 as well as three national champions in Peg Neppel-Darrah, Dorthe Rasmussen, and Betsy Saina in 1975, 1981, and 2012 respectively.

Women All-Americans
Year	Name	Place
1975	Peg Neppel-Darrah	1st
1975	Barb Brown	8th
1976	Carol Cook	2nd
1976	Katy Schilly	8th
1976	Bredget Seip	9th
1977	Debbie Vetter	10th
1978	Debbie Vetter	8th
1981	Dorthe Rasmussen	1st
1981	Margaret Davis	8th
1981	Catherine Hunter	18th
1982	Margaret Davis	8th
1982	Suzanne Youngberg	29th
1983	Margaret Davis	14th
1983	Suzanne Youngberg	29th
1985	Bonnie Sons	25th
1985	Jill Slettedahl	29th
1986	Suzanne Youngberg	32nd
1988	Maria Akraka	32nd
1989	Edith Nakiyingi	15th
1990	Madeleine Alsgren	5th
2006	Lisa Koll	36th
2006	Lisa Koll	18th
2007	Grace Kemmey	22nd
2007	Lisa Koll	11th
2010	Aliphine Tuliamuk	13th
2011	Betsy Saina	9th
2011	Meaghan Nelson	17th
2011	Dani Stack	30th
2012	Betsy Saina	1st
2012	Meaghan Nelson	16th
2013	Crystal Nelson	32nd
2013	Bethanie Brown	37th
2014	Crystal Nelson	7th
2014	Katy Moen	8th
2018	Annie Frisbie	34th
2019	Callie Logue	15th
2021	Callie Logue	4th

== ISU Cross Country Course ==
Iowa State is one of only a handful of institutions in the country to have its own fully dedicated cross country course located on its campus. The convenience of the course's location provides Iowa State University's distance runners a significant training advantage.

The athletic department dedicated the Cross Country Course in October 1995 as the first course in the nation designed exclusively for competitive cross country racing. The University showcased the course to a national audience by hosting the 1995 NCAA Division I Cross Country Championships. Since that time the course also served as the site of the 2000 NCAA Championships, the 2008 Big 12 Championships and the 2013 NCAA Midwest Cross Country Regional.

The athletics program recently invested nearly $1 million in course improvements including irrigating the entire course and creating a permanent finish line structure with two large grass berms that provide spectators with views of the finish area. The irrigation system allows the department's staff to maintain the running surface at a championship level throughout the season.

== See also ==
- Iowa State Cyclones track and field
