= Sean Dollman =

Irish long-distance runner

Sean Dollman (born 8 December 1968) is a retired Irish long-distance runner. Born in Cape Town, South Africa, he represented Ireland in two Olympics, running the 10,000 metres in 1992 and 1996. He was the 1991 NCAA Cross Country Champion while representing Western Kentucky University and was the sixth placer finisher the year before.
