= 2011 NCAA Division I cross country championships =

2011 cross-country running meet of the NCAA (Division I)

2011 NCAA Division I Cross Country Championships
- Organisers: NCAA
- Edition: 73rd–Men; 31st–Women
- Date: November 21, 2011
- Host city: (Indiana) Terre Haute, IN
- Venue: Indiana State University; LaVern Gibson Championship Cross Country Course
- Distances: 10 km–Men; 6 km–Women
- Participation: 252–Men; 254–Women; 506–Total athletes

The 2011 NCAA Division I Cross Country Championships were the 73rd annual NCAA Men's Division I Cross Country Championship and the 31st annual NCAA Women's Division I Cross Country Championship to determine the team and individual national champions of NCAA Division I men's and women's collegiate cross country running in the United States. In all, four different titles were contested: men's and women's individual and team championships.

Held on November 21, 2011, the combined meet was the eighth of eight consecutive meets hosted by Indiana State University at the LaVern Gibson Championship Cross Country Course in Terre Haute, Indiana. The distance for the men's race was 10 kilometers (6.21 miles) while the distance for the women's race was 6 kilometers (3.73 miles).

The men's team championship was won by Wisconsin (97 points), the Badgers' fifth overall and first since 2005. The women's team championship was won by Georgetown (162 points), the Hoyas' first.

The two individual champions were, for the men, Lawi Lalang (Arizona, 28:44.1) and, for the women, Sheila Reid (Villanova, 19:41.2); it was her second consecutive title.

== Men's title ==
- Distance: 10,000 meters

=== Men's Team Result (Top 10) ===
Rank	Team	Points
1st place, gold medalist(s)	Wisconsin	97
2nd place, silver medalist(s)	Oklahoma State	139
3rd place, bronze medalist(s)	Colorado	144
4	BYU	283
5	Stanford	287
6	Oklahoma	216
7	Indiana	257
8	Portland	259
9	Iona	265
10	NC State	282

=== Men's Individual Result (Top 10) ===
Rank	Name	Team	Time
1st place, gold medalist(s)	(Kenya) (United States) Lawi Lalang	Arizona	28:44.1
2nd place, silver medalist(s)	(United States) Chris Derrick	Stanford	28:57.5
3rd place, bronze medalist(s)	(Kenya) (United States) Leonard Korir	Iona	29:02.5
4	(Canada) Cameron Levins	Southern Utah	29:04.8
5	(Canada) Mohammed Ahmed	Wisconsin	29:06.7
6	(United States) Luke Puskedra	Oregon	29:09.3
7	(Mexico) (United States) Diego Estrada	Northern Arizona	29:24.7
8	(United States) Richard Medina	Colorado	29:27.8
9	(Kenya) Henry Lelei	Texas A&M	29:29.1
10	(United States) Colby Lowe	Oklahoma State	29:31.4

== Women's title ==
- Distance: 6,000 meters

=== Women's Team Result (Top 10) ===
Rank	Team	Points
1st place, gold medalist(s)	Georgetown	162
2nd place, silver medalist(s)	Washington	178
3rd place, bronze medalist(s)	Villanova	181
4	Florida State	189
5	Oregon	281
6	Vanderbilt	282
7	Iowa State	290
8	West Virginia	297
9	New Mexico	322
10	Stanford	332

=== Women's Individual Result (Top 10) ===
Rank	Name	Team	Time
1st place, gold medalist(s)	(Canada) Sheila Reid	Villanova	19:41.2
2nd place, silver medalist(s)	(United States) Jordan Hasay	Oregon	19:41.8
3rd place, bronze medalist(s)	(United States) Abbey D'Agostino	Dartmouth	19:42.9
4	(United States) Emily Infeld	Georgetown	19:44.3
5	(United States) Alex Banfich	Princeton	19:45.0
6	(Serbia) Bogdana Mimic	Villanova	19:45.7
7	(United States) Katie Flood	Washington	19:47.9
8	(Canada) Kate Harrison	West Virginia	19:49.5
9	(Kenya) (United States) Betsy Saina	Iowa State	19:50.7
10	(United States) Tara Erdmann	Loyola Marymount	19:51.3
