= 2012 NCAA Division I cross country championships =

2012 cross-country running meet of the NCAA (Division I)

2012 NCAA Division I Cross Country Championships
- Organisers: NCAA
- Edition: 74th–Men; 32nd–Women
- Date: November 17, 2012
- Host city: (Kentucky) Louisville, KY
- Venue: University of Louisville; E. P. "Tom" Sawyer State Park
- Distances: 10 km–Men; 6 km–Women
- Participation: 245–Men; 253–Women; 498–Total athletes

The 2012 NCAA Division I Cross Country Championships were the 74th annual NCAA Men's Division I Cross Country Championship and the 32nd annual NCAA Women's Division I Cross Country Championship to determine the team and individual national champions of NCAA Division I men's and women's collegiate cross country running in the United States. In all, four different titles were contested: men's and women's individual and team championships.

Held on November 17, 2012, the combined meet was hosted by the University of Louisville at E. P. "Tom" Sawyer State Park in Louisville, Kentucky. The distance for the men's race was 10 kilometers (6.21 miles) while the distance for the women's race was 6 kilometers (3.73 miles).

The men's team championship was won by Oklahoma State (72 points), the Cowboys' third overall and third in four years. The women's team championship was won by Oregon (114 points), the Ducks' third and first since 1987.

The two individual champions were, for the men, Kennedy Kithuka (Texas Tech, 28:31.3) and, for the women, Betsy Saina (Iowa State, 19:27.9).

== Men's title ==
- Distance: 10,000 meters

=== Men's Team Result (Top 10) ===
Rank	Team	Points
1st place, gold medalist(s)	Oklahoma State	72
2nd place, silver medalist(s)	Wisconsin	135
3rd place, bronze medalist(s)	Colorado	158
4	Northern Arizona	191
5	Florida State	238
6	BYU	245
7	Tulsa	247
8	Oklahoma	262
9	Texas	291
10	Arkansas	327

=== Men's Individual Result (Top 10) ===
Rank	Name	Team	Time
1st place, gold medalist(s)	(Kenya) Kennedy Kithuka	Texas Tech	28:31.3
2nd place, silver medalist(s)	(Kenya) Stephen Sambu	Arizona	28:38.6
3rd place, bronze medalist(s)	(Kenya) (United States) Lawi Lalang	Arizona	28:51.8
4	(Kenya) (United States) Anthony Rotich	UTEP	29:13.5
5	(United States) Girma Mecheso (Kenya) Henry Lelei	Oklahoma State; Texas A&M	29:14.8
7	(Republic of Ireland) David Rooney	McNeese State	29:21.3
8	(Canada) Mohammed Ahmed	Wisconsin	29:23.9
9	(United Kingdom) Tom Farrell	Oklahoma State	29:26.3
10	(United States) Paul Chelimo	UNC-Greensboro	29:29.8

== Women's title ==
- Distance: 6,000 meters

=== Women's Team Result (Top 10) ===
Rank	Team	Points
1st place, gold medalist(s)	Oregon	114
2nd place, silver medalist(s)	Providence	183
3rd place, bronze medalist(s)	Stanford	198
4	Florida State	202
5	Michigan	247
6	Arizona	263
7	Duke	300
8	Connecticut	304
9	Washington	334
10	New Mexico	341

=== Women's Individual Result (Top 10) ===
Rank	Name	Team	Time
1st place, gold medalist(s)	(Kenya) (United States) Betsy Saina	Iowa State	19:27.9
2nd place, silver medalist(s)	(United States) Abbey D'Agostino	Dartmouth	19:28.6
3rd place, bronze medalist(s)	(United States) Jordan Hasay	Oregon	19:28.6
4	(United States) Aliphine Tuliamuk-Bolton	Wichita State	19:33.7
5	(Kenya) Risper Kimaiyo	UTEP	19:41.0
6	(United States) Cally Macumber	Kentucky	19:42.2
7	(Germany) Mareike Schrulle	Tennessee	19:43.3
8	(United States) Alexi Pappas	Oregon	19:43.9
9	(United States) Laura Hollander	Cal Poly–San Luis Obispo	19:45.2
10	(Republic of Ireland) Sarah Collins	Providence	19:50.7
