= 1982 NCAA Division I cross country championships =

1982 cross-country running meet of the NCAA (Division I)

1982 NCAA Division I Cross Country Championships
- Organisers: NCAA
- Edition: 44th (Men); 2nd (Women)
- Date: November 22, 1982
- Host city: Bloomington, IN; Indiana University
- Venue: IU Championship Cross Country Course
- Distances: 10 km–Men; 5 km–Women
- Participation: 176–Men; 132–Women; 308–Total athletes

The 1982 NCAA Division I Cross Country Championships were the 44th annual NCAA Men's Division I Cross Country Championship and the 2nd annual NCAA Women's Division I Cross Country Championship to determine the team and individual national champions of NCAA Division I men's and women's collegiate cross country running in the United States. In all, four different titles were contested: men's and women's individual and team championships.

Held on November 22, 1982, the combined meet was hosted by Indiana University at the IU Championship Cross Country Course in Bloomington, Indiana. The distance for the men's race was 10 kilometers (6.21 miles) while the distance for the women's race was 5 kilometers (3.11 miles).

The men's team national championship was won by the Wisconsin Badgers, their first overall title. The individual championship was won by English runner Mark Scrutton, from Colorado, with a time of 30:12.60.

The women's team national championship was again won by the Virginia Cavaliers, their second. The individual championship was won by Lesley Welch, also from Virginia, with a time of 16:39.7.

== Qualification ==
- All Division I cross country teams were eligible to qualify for the meet through their placement at various regional qualifying meets. In total, 22 teams and 176 runners contested the men's championship while 16 teams and 132 runners contested the women's title.

== Men's title ==
- Distance: 10,000 meters (6.21 miles)

=== Men's Team Result (Top 10) ===
Rank	Team	Points
1st place, gold medalist(s)	Wisconsin	59
2nd place, silver medalist(s)	Providence	138
3rd place, bronze medalist(s)	Arkansas	142
4	East Tennessee State	158
5	UTEP	173
6	Michigan	177
7	Colorado	219
8	Clemson	238
9	UCLA	250
10	Oregon	266

=== Men's Individual Result (Top 10) ===
Rank	Name	Nationality	Time
1st place, gold medalist(s)	(United Kingdom) Mark Scrutton	Colorado	30:12.60
2nd place, silver medalist(s)	(Tanzania) Zakarie Barie	UTEP	30:14.80
3rd place, bronze medalist(s)	(Netherlands) Hans Koeleman	Clemson	30:23.90
4	(United States) Tim Hacker	Wisconsin	30:26.90
5	(United States) Scott Jenkins	Wisconsin	30:30.80
6	(Kenya) Joseph Kipsang	Iowa State	30:30.90
7	(United States) Gerard Donakowski	Michigan	30:31.00
8	(United States) Ed Eyestone	BYU	30:31.80
9	(United States) Kevin Johnson	East Tennessee State	30:31.90
10	(Tanzania) Gidamis Shahanga	UTEP	30:32.80

== Women's title ==
- Distance: 5,000 meters (3.11 miles)

=== Women's Team Result (Top 10) ===
Rank	Team	Points
1st place, gold medalist(s)	Virginia	48
2nd place, silver medalist(s)	Stanford	91
3rd place, bronze medalist(s)	Oregon	155
4	Harvard	167
5	Clemson	171
6	Penn State	193
7	NC State	195
8	Iowa State	202
8	Michigan	202
10	Wisconsin	211

=== Women's Individual Result (Top 10) ===
Rank	Name	Nationality	Time
1st place, gold medalist(s)	(United States) Lesley Welsh	Virginia	16:39.70
2nd place, silver medalist(s)	(Republic of Ireland) Regina Joyce	Washington	17:07.00
3rd place, bronze medalist(s)	(United States) Ceci Hopp	Stanford	17:10.50
4	(United States) Jill Haworth (United States) Margaret Davis	Virginia; Iowa State	17:12.00
6	(United States) Wendy Van Hierlo	Illinois State	17:13.80
7	(United States) Kathy Hadler	Tennessee	17:14.00
8	(United States) Kate Wiley	Harvard	17:16.20
9	(United States) Allison Wiley	Stanford	17:20.50
10	(United States) Nanette Doak	Iowa	17:21.00

== Notes ==
1. The official NCAA championship statistics website (see references) made a typo where Iowa State scored 207 points. This is not correct, as Iowa State tied with Michigan with 202 points. Reference:

== See also ==
- NCAA Men's Division II Cross Country Championship
- NCAA Women's Division II Cross Country Championship
- NCAA Men's Division III Cross Country Championship
- NCAA Women's Division III Cross Country Championship
