= 1994 NCAA Division I cross country championships =

1994 cross-country running meet of the NCAA (Division I)

1994 NCAA Division I Cross Country Championships
- Organisers: NCAA
- Edition: 56th–Men; 14th–Women
- Date: November 21, 1994
- Host city: (Arkansas) Fayetteville, AR
- Venue: University of Arkansas
- Distances: 10 km–Men; 5 km–Women
- Participation: 178–Men; 181–Women; 359–Total athletes

The 1994 NCAA Division I Cross Country Championships were the 56th annual NCAA Men's Division I Cross Country Championship and the 14th annual NCAA Women's Division I Cross Country Championship to determine the team and individual national champions of NCAA Division I men's and women's collegiate cross country running in the United States. In all, four different titles were contested: men's and women's individual and team championships.

Held on November 21, 1994, the combined meet was hosted by the University of Arkansas in Fayetteville, Arkansas. The distance for the men's race was 10 kilometers (6.21 miles) while the distance for the women's race was 5 kilometers (3.11 miles).

The men's team championship was won by Iowa State, their second overall title and first since 1989. The women's team championship, however, was once again retained by Villanova, their sixth overall and fourth consecutive.

The two individual champions were Martin Keino (Arizona, 30:08.7) and Jennifer Rhines (Villanova, 16:31.2).

== Men's title ==
- Distance: 10,000 meters

=== Men's Team Result (Top 10) ===
Rank	Team	Points
1st place, gold medalist(s)	Iowa State	65
2nd place, silver medalist(s)	Colorado	88
3rd place, bronze medalist(s)	Arizona	172
4	Northern Arizona	181
5	Wisconsin	185
6	Stanford	208
7	Michigan	222
8	Penn State	250
9	Villanova	263
10	Arkansas (H)	266

- (H) – Host team

=== Men's Individual Result (Top 10) ===
Rank	Name	Team	Time
1st place, gold medalist(s)	(Kenya) Martin Keino	Arizona	30:08.7
2nd place, silver medalist(s)	(United States) Adam Goucher	Colorado	30:12.0
3rd place, bronze medalist(s)	(Canada) Kevin Sullivan	Michigan	30:22.4
4	(Netherlands) Kamiel Maase	Texas	30:28.0
5	(United Kingdom) Jon Wild	Oklahoma State	30:29.9
6	(United States) Gregory Jimmerson	Stanford	30:34.5
7	(United States) Jason Casiano	Wisconsin	30:35.1
8	(United States) James Menon	Wisconsin	30:35.7
9	(United Kingdom) Ian Robinson	Iowa State	30:36.5
10	(United States) Jason Bunton	Arkansas	30:39.0

== Women's title ==
- Distance: 5,000 meters

=== Women's Team Result (Top 10) ===
Rank	Team	Points
1st place, gold medalist(s)	Villanova	75
2nd place, silver medalist(s)	Michigan	108
3rd place, bronze medalist(s)	Arkansas (H)	110
4	Colorado	126
5	Providence	154
6	Georgetown	195
7	Stanford	198
8	Wisconsin	233
9	Penn State	250
10	Arizona	273

- (H) – Host team

=== Women's Individual Result (Top 10) ===
Rank	Name	Team	Time
1st place, gold medalist(s)	(United States) Jennifer Rhines	Villanova	16:31.2
2nd place, silver medalist(s)	(United States) Amy Rudolph	Providence	16:44.8
3rd place, bronze medalist(s)	(United States) Rebecca Spies	Villanova	16:55.8
4	(United States) Megan Flowers	Arkansas	17:04.2
5	(Canada) Kathy Butler	Wisconsin	17:07.8
6	(United Kingdom) Alice Braham	Oklahoma	17:09.1
7	(United States) Suzanne Castruita	Arizona	17:09.7
8	(Germany) Christine Stief	Boston University	17:10.3
9	(United States) Karen Hecox	UCLA	17:12.8
10	(United States) Marcie Homan	William & Mary	17:14.4
