= 1972 NCAA University Division cross country championships =

1972 cross-country running meet of the NCAA (University Division)

1972 NCAA University Division Cross Country Championships
- Organisers: NCAA
- Edition: 34th
- Date: November 20, 1972
- Host city: (Texas) Houston, TX; University of Houston
- Venue: Glenbrook Golf Course
- Distances: 6 miles (9.7 km)
- Participation: 241 athletes

The 1972 NCAA University Division Cross Country Championships were the 34th annual cross country meet to determine the team and individual national champions of men's collegiate cross country running in the United States. Held on November 20, 1972, the meet was hosted by the University of Houston at the Glenbrook Golf Course in Houston, Texas. The distance for this race was 6 miles (9.7 kilometers).

All NCAA University Division members were eligible to qualify for the meet. In total, 25 teams and 241 individual runners contested this championship.

The team national championship was won by the Tennessee Volunteers, their first title. The individual championship was won by Neil Cusack, from East Tennessee State, with a time of 28:23.00.

== Men's title ==
- Distance: 6 miles (9.7 kilometers)

=== Team Result (Top 10) ===
| Rank | Team | Points |
|---|---|---|
| 1st place, gold medalist(s) | Tennessee | 127 |
| 2nd place, silver medalist(s) | East Tennessee State | 133 |
| 3rd place, bronze medalist(s) | Oklahoma State | 150 |
| 4 | Bowling Green | 162 |
| 5 | Oregon | 169 |
| 6 | Miami (OH) | 172 |
| 7 | Washington State | 184 |
| 8 | BYU | 212 |
| 9 | Penn State | 291 |
| 10 | Manhattan | 305 |

== See also ==
- NCAA Men's College Division Cross Country Championship
