= 1983 NCAA Division I cross country championships =

1983 cross-country running meet of the NCAA (Division I)

1983 NCAA Division I Cross Country Championships
- Organisers: NCAA
- Edition: 45th (Men); 3rd (Women)
- Date: November 21, 1983
- Host city: Bethlehem, PA; Lehigh University
- Venue: Saucon Valley Fields
- Distances: 10 km–Men; 5 km–Women
- Participation: 182–Men; 133–Women; 315–Total athletes

The 1983 NCAA Division I Cross Country Championships were the 45th annual NCAA Men's Division I Cross Country Championship and the 3rd annual NCAA Women's Division I Cross Country Championship to determine the team and individual national champions of NCAA Division I men's and women's collegiate cross country running in the United States. In all, four different titles were contested: men's and women's individual and team championships.

Held on November 21, 1983, the combined meet was hosted by Lehigh University at the Saucon Valley Fields in Bethlehem, Pennsylvania. The distance for the men's race was 10 kilometers (6.21 miles) while the distance for the women's race was 5 kilometers (3.11 miles).

The men's team national championship was won by UTEP, but the Miners' performance was later vacated by the NCAA. The individual championship was won by Zakarie Barie, also from UTEP, with a time of 29:20.0.

The men's team championship was vacated in July 1986 by the NCAA due to UTEP making cash payments totaling $62,150 to athletes.

The women's team national championship was won by Oregon, their first. The individual championship was won by Betty Jo Springs, from NC State, with a time of 16:30.7. This was Springs' second championship after winning the inaugural race in 1981.

== Qualification ==
- All Division I cross country teams were eligible to qualify for the meet through their placement at various regional qualifying meets. In total, 22 teams and 182 runners contested the men's championship while 16 teams and 133 runners contested the women's title.

== Men's title ==
- Distance: 10,000 meters (6.21 miles)

=== Men's Team Result (Top 10) ===
Rank	Team	Points
1st place, gold medalist(s)	UTEP†	108†
2nd place, silver medalist(s)	Wisconsin	164
3rd place, bronze medalist(s)	Oregon	171
4	Clemson	191
5	Arkansas	206
6	East Tennessee State	243
7	Providence	257
8	Iowa State	269
9	Illinois	273
10	Tennessee	291

=== Men's Individual Result (Top 10) ===
Rank	Name	Nationality	Time
1st place, gold medalist(s)	(Tanzania) Zakarie Barie	UTEP	29:20.00
2nd place, silver medalist(s)	(Kenya) Yobes Ondieki	Iowa State	29:41.30
3rd place, bronze medalist(s)	(United States) John Easker	Wisconsin	29:44.40
4	(Kenya) Joseph Kipsang	Iowa State	29:52.40
5	(United States) James Hill	Oregon	29:54.40
6	(Republic of Ireland) Richard O'Flynn	Providence	29:56.10
7	(Netherlands) Hans Koeleman	Clemson	29:59.80
8	(Tanzania) Gidamis Shahanga	UTEP	30:11.70
9	(United States) Ed Eyestone	BYU	30:13.00
10	(Republic of Ireland) Paul Donovan	Arkansas	30:13.20

- Note: UTEP's team title was later revoked by the NCAA for rules infractions.

== Women's title ==
- Distance: 5,000 meters (3.11 miles)

=== Women's Team Result (Top 10) ===
Rank	Team	Points
1st place, gold medalist(s)	Oregon	95
2nd place, silver medalist(s)	Stanford	98
3rd place, bronze medalist(s)	NC State	99
4	Tennessee	103
5	Wisconsin	107
6	Iowa State	137
7	Clemson	183
8	North Carolina	204
9	BYU	214
10	Minnesota	244

=== Women's Individual Result (Top 10) ===
Rank	Name	Nationality	Time
1st place, gold medalist(s)	(United States) Betty Jo Springs	NC State	16:30.70
2nd place, silver medalist(s)	(United States) Nanette Doak	Iowa	16:35.20
3rd place, bronze medalist(s)	(United States) Kathy Hayes	Oregon	16:35.50
4	(United States) Liz Natale	Tennessee	16:42.60
5	(United States) Andrea Fischer	Missouri	16:49.10
6	(United States) Sabrina Dornhoefer	Missouri	16:54.60
7	(United States) Tina Krebs	Clemson	16:54.70
8	(United States) Cathy Branta	Wisconsin	16:54.80
9	(United States) Regina Jacobs	Stanford	16:59.30
10	(United States) Patti Plumer	Stanford	17:00.70

== See also ==
- NCAA Men's Division II Cross Country Championship
- NCAA Women's Division II Cross Country Championship
- NCAA Men's Division III Cross Country Championship
- NCAA Women's Division III Cross Country Championship
