= NCAA Division I women's cross country championships =

American college sports tournament

- Association: NCAA
- Sport: Cross country
- Founded: 1981; 45 years ago
- Division: Division I
- Country: United States
- Most recent champions: Team: Alabama (1st); Individual: Hannah Gapes, NC State
- Most titles: Team: Villanova (9); Individual: Villanova (9)
- Broadcaster: ESPN
- Website: NCAA.com

The NCAA Division I women's cross country championships are contested at an annual meet hosted by the National Collegiate Athletic Association to determine the individual and team national champions of women's collegiate cross country running among its Division I members in the United States. The championships have been every year since 1981, except for 2020.

Teams and individual runners qualify for the championship at regional competitions approximately a week before the national championships.

Villanova has been the most successful program, with nine team and nine individual titles.

Alabama is the reigning national champion, winning its first title in 2026.

== Qualifying ==
The teams each compete in one of nine regional championships to qualify. Then the top two teams automatically advance, and 13 additional teams are chosen as at-large selections. In addition to the 31 teams, 38 individual runners qualify for the national championship.

== History ==
The Division I national championship race included 13 teams in 1981, 16 teams from 1982 to 1988 and 22 teams from 1989 to 1997. Beginning in 1998, the national championship race has included 31 teams.

The race distance from 1981 to 1999 was 5,000 meters (3.1 miles). Since 2000 the race distance has been 6,000 meters (3.7 miles).

Cross country was one of twelve women's sports added to the NCAA championship program for the 1981–82 school year, as the NCAA engaged in battle with the Association for Intercollegiate Athletics for Women for sole governance of women's collegiate sports. The AIAW continued to conduct its established championship program in the same twelve (and other) sports; however, after a year of dual women's championships, the NCAA conquered the AIAW and usurped its authority and membership.

Villanova has won more NCAA Division I women's titles (9) than any other school, followed by BYU with 6. BYU and North Carolina State have competed in the most NCAA Division I women's championships (25). Villanova has had the most individual NCAA Division I women's cross country champions (9).

== Results ==
The championship race distance was 5,000 meters from 1981 to 1999, and has been 6,000 meters since the 2000 race.

NCAA Women's Division I Cross Country Championship
Year	Host city (Host Team)	Team Championship				Individual Championship	
Year	Host city (Host Team)	Winner	Points	Runner-up	Points	Winner (Team)	Time
1981; Details	Wichita, KS (Wichita State)	Virginia	36	Oregon	81	Betty Jo Springs (NC State)	16:19.0
1982; Details	Bloomington, IN (Indiana)	Virginia	48	Stanford	91	Lesley Welch (Virginia)	16:39.7
1983; Details	Bethlehem, PA (Lehigh)	Oregon	95	Stanford	98	Betty Jo Springs (NC State)	16:30.7
1984; Details	State College, PA (Penn State)	Wisconsin	63	Stanford	89	Cathy Branta (Wisconsin)	16:15.6
1985; Details	Milwaukee, WI (Marquette)	Wisconsin	58	Iowa State	98	Suzie Tuffey (NC State)	16:22.53
1986; Details	Tucson, AZ (Arizona)	Texas	62	Wisconsin	64	Angela Chalmers (Northern Arizona)	16:55.49
1987; Details	Charlottesville, VA (Virginia)	Oregon	97	NC State	99	Kimberly Betz (Indiana)	16:10.85
1988; Details	Ames, IA (Iowa State)	Kentucky	75	Oregon	128	Michelle Dekkers (Indiana)	16:30.00
1989; Details	Annapolis, MD (Navy)	Villanova	99	Kentucky	168	Vicki Huber (Villanova)	15:59.86†
1990; Details	Knoxville, TN (Tennessee)	Villanova	82	Providence	172	Sonia O'Sullivan (Villanova)	16:06.00
1991; Details	Tucson, AZ (Arizona)	Villanova	85	Arkansas	168	Sonia O'Sullivan (Villanova)	16:30.3
1992; Details	Bloomington, IN (Indiana)	Villanova	123	Arkansas	130	Carole Zajac (Villanova)	17:01.9
1993; Details	Bethlehem, PA (Lehigh)	Villanova	66	Arkansas	71	Carole Zajac (Villanova)	16:40.3
1994; Details	Fayetteville, AR (Arkansas)	Villanova	75	Michigan	108	Jennifer Rhines (Villanova)	16:31.2
1995; Details	Ames, IA (Iowa State)	Providence	88	Colorado	123	Kathy Butler (Wisconsin)	16:51
1996; Details	Tucson, AZ (Arizona)	Stanford	101	Villanova	106	Amy Skieresz (Arizona)	17:04
1997; Details	Greenville, SC (Furman)	BYU	100	Stanford	102	Carrie Tollefson (Villanova)	16:29
1998; Details	Lawrence, KS (Kansas)	Villanova	106	BYU	110	Katie McGregor (Michigan)	16:47.21
1999; Details	Bloomington, IN (Indiana)	BYU	72	Arkansas	125	Erica Palmer (Wisconsin)	16:39.5
Race distance changes from 5,000 meters to 6,000 meters
2000; Details	Ames, IA (Iowa State)	Colorado	117	BYU	167	Kara Grgas-Wheeler (Colorado)	20:30.5
2001; Details	Greenville, SC (Furman)	BYU	62	NC State	148	Tara Chaplin (Arizona)	20:24
2002; Details	Terre Haute, IN (Indiana State)	BYU	85	Stanford	113	Shalane Flanagan (North Carolina)	19:36.0
2003; Details	Cedar Falls, IA (Northern Iowa)	Stanford	120	BYU	128	Shalane Flanagan (North Carolina)	19:30.4
2004; Details	Terre Haute, IN (Indiana State)	Colorado	63	Duke	144	Kim Smith (Providence)	20:08.5
2005; Details	Terre Haute, IN (Indiana State)	Stanford	146	Colorado	181	Johanna Nilsson (Northern Arizona)	19:33.9
2006; Details	Terre Haute, IN (Indiana State)	Stanford	195	Colorado	223	Sally Kipyego (Texas Tech)	20:11.1
2007; Details	Terre Haute, IN (Indiana State)	Stanford	145	Oregon	177	Sally Kipyego (Texas Tech)	19:30.9
2008; Details	Terre Haute, IN (Indiana State)	Washington	79	Oregon	131	Sally Kipyego (Texas Tech)	19:28.1
2009; Details	Terre Haute, IN (Indiana State)	Villanova	86	Florida State	133	Angela Bizzarri (Illinois)	19:46.8
2010; Details	Terre Haute, IN (Indiana State)	Villanova	120	Florida State	154	Sheila Reid (Villanova)	20:06.9
2011; Details	Terre Haute, IN (Indiana State)	Georgetown	162	Washington	170	Sheila Reid (Villanova)	19:41.2
2012; Details	Louisville, KY (Louisville)	Oregon	114	Providence	183	Betsy Saina (Iowa State)	19:27.9
2013; Details	Terre Haute, IN (Indiana State)	Providence	141	Arizona	197	Abbey D'Agostino (Dartmouth)	20:00.3
2014; Details	Terre Haute, IN (Indiana State)	Michigan State	85	Iowa State	147	Kate Avery (Iona)	19:31.6
2015; Details	Louisville, KY (Louisville)	New Mexico	49	Colorado	129	Molly Seidel (Notre Dame)	19:28.6
2016; Details	Terre Haute, IN (Indiana State)	Oregon	125	Michigan	126	Karissa Schweizer (Missouri)	19:41.7
2017; Details	Louisville, KY (Louisville)	New Mexico	90	San Francisco	105	Ednah Kurgat (New Mexico)	19:19.42
2018; Details	Madison, WI (Wisconsin)	Colorado	65	New Mexico	103	Dani Jones (Colorado)	19:42.8
2019; Details	Terre Haute, IN (Indiana State)	Arkansas	96	BYU	102	Weini Kelati (New Mexico)	19:47.5
2020; Details	Stillwater, OK (Oklahoma State)	BYU	96	NC State	161	Mercy Chelangat; Alabama	20:01.1
2021; Details	Tallahassee, FL (Florida State)	NC State	84	BYU	122	Whittni Orton (BYU)	19:25.4
2022; Details	Stillwater, OK (Oklahoma State)	NC State	114	New Mexico	140	Katelyn Tuohy (NC State)	19:27.7
2023; Details	Charlottesville, VA (Virginia)	NC State	123	Northern Arizona	124	Parker Valby (Florida)	18:55.2
2024; Details	Madison, WI (Wisconsin)	BYU	147	West Virginia	164	Doris Lemngole (Alabama)	19:21.0
2025; Details	Columbia, MO (Missouri)	NC State	114	BYU	130	Doris Lemngole (Alabama)	18:25.4†
2026; Details	Terre Haute, IN (Indiana State)	Alabama	120	West Virginia	145	Hannah Gapes (NC State)	18:44.3
2027; Details	Stillwater, OK (Oklahoma State)						

- A time highlighted in ██ indicates an NCAA championship event record time for that distance at the time.
- A † indicates the all-time NCAA championship event record for that distance.

== Champions ==
=== Team titles ===
- List updated through the 2025 Championships.
National Championships by school: 9, 6, 5, 4, 3, 2, 1

Team	Titles	Year Won
Villanova	9	1989, 1990, 1991, 1992, 1993, 1994, 1998, 2009, 2010
BYU	6	1997, 1999, 2001, 2002, 2020, 2024
Stanford	5	1996, 2003, 2005, 2006, 2007
NC State	4	2021, 2022, 2023, 2025
Oregon	4	1983, 1987, 2012, 2016
Colorado	3	2000, 2004, 2018
New Mexico	2	2015, 2017
Providence	2	1995, 2013
Virginia	2	1981, 1982
Wisconsin	2	1984, 1985
Alabama	1	2026
Arkansas	1	2019
Georgetown	1	2011
Kentucky	1	1988
Michigan State	1	2014
Texas	1	1986
Washington	1	2008

=== Individual titles ===
- List updated through the 2025 Championships.

Team	Titles	Year won
Villanova	9	1989, 1990, 1991, 1992, 1993, 1994, 1997, 2010, 2011
NC State	5	1981, 1983, 1985, 2022, 2026
Alabama	3	2020, 2024, 2025
Texas Tech	3	2006, 2007, 2008
Wisconsin	3	1984, 1995, 1999
Arizona	2	1996, 2001
Colorado	2	2000, 2018
Indiana	2	1987, 1988
New Mexico	2	2017, 2019
North Carolina	2	2002, 2003
Northern Arizona	2	1986, 2005
BYU	1	2021
Dartmouth	1	2013
Florida	1	2023
Illinois	1	2009
Iona	1	2014
Iowa State	1	2012
Michigan	1	1998
Missouri	1	2016
Notre Dame	1	2015
Providence	1	2004
Virginia	1	1982

== Appearances ==
- List updated through the 2025 Championships.

=== Most team appearances (Top 15) ===
Rank	Team	Appearances
1	NC State	39
2	Stanford	38
2	BYU	38
4	Arkansas	37
5	Oregon	36
6	Michigan	34
6	Wisconsin	34
8	Colorado	33
9	Georgetown	32
9	Villanova	32
9	Providence	32
12	Washington	31
13	Michigan State	26
13	Penn State	26
15	Minnesota	22
15	Notre Dame	22

== Records ==
- Best Team Score: 35
  - Virginia (1981; Eileen O'Connor–3, Lesley Welch–4, Lisa Welch–6, Jill Haworth–8, Marisa Schmitt–15)
- Most Individual Titles: 3 (tie)
  - (Kenya) Sally Kipyego, Texas Tech (2006, 2007, and 2008)
- Best Individual Time, 5,000 meters: 15:59.86
  - Vicki Huber, Villanova (1989)
- Best Individual Time, 6,000 meters: 18:25.4
  - Doris Lemngole, Alabama (2025)

== See also ==
- Pre-NCAA Cross Country Champions
- AIAW Intercollegiate Women's Cross Country Champions
- NCAA Women's Division II Cross Country Championship (from 1981)
- NCAA Women's Division III Cross Country Championship (from 1981)
- NCAA Men's Division I Cross Country Championship (from 1938)
- NCAA Men's Division II Cross Country Championship (from 1958)
- NCAA Men's Division III Cross Country Championship (from 1973)
- NAIA Cross Country Championships (Men, Women)
