= 1990 NCAA Division I cross country championships =

1990 cross-country running meet of the NCAA (Division I)

1990 NCAA Division I Cross Country Championships
- Organisers: NCAA
- Edition: 52nd–Men; 10th–Women
- Date: November 19, 1990
- Host city: Knoxville, TN; University of Tennessee
- Venue: Pine Lakes Golf Course
- Distances: 10 km–Men; 5 km–Women
- Participation: 181–Men; 179–Women; 360–Total athletes

The 1990 NCAA Division I Cross Country Championships were the 52nd annual NCAA Men's Division I Cross Country Championship and the 10th annual NCAA Women's Division I Cross Country Championship to determine the team and individual national champions of NCAA Division I men's and women's collegiate cross country running in the United States. In all, four different titles were contested: men's and women's individual and team championships.

Held on November 19, 1990, the combined meet was hosted by the University of Tennessee at Pine Lakes Golf Course in Knoxville, Tennessee. The distance for the men's race was 10 kilometers (6.21 miles) while the distance for the women's race was 5 kilometers (3.11 miles).

The men's team national championship was won by Arkansas, their fourth team national title. The individual championship was won by Jonah Koech, from Iowa State, with a time of 29:05.00.

The women's team national championship was won by Villanova, their second team (and second consecutive) national title. The individual championship was won by Sonia O'Sullivan, also from Villanova, with a time of 16:06.00.

== Qualification ==
- All Division I cross country teams were eligible to qualify for the meet through their placement at various regional qualifying meets. In total, 22 teams and 181 runners contested the men's championship while 22 teams and 179 runners contested the women's title.

== Men's title ==
- Distance: 10,000 meters (6.21 miles)
- Competitors: 22 teams, 181 runners
- Full Results: MileSplit.com

=== Men's Team Result (Top 10) ===
Rank	Team	Points	Avg. Time
1st place, gold medalist(s)	Arkansas	68	29:57
2nd place, silver medalist(s)	Iowa State	96	29:57
3rd place, bronze medalist(s)	Notre Dame	185	30:30
4	Texas	192	30:33
5	Oregon	201	30:34
6	Florida	218	30:38
7	Tennessee	235	30:32
8	Boston University	246	30:45
9	Wisconsin	247	30:43
10	Connecticut	272	30:46

=== Men's Individual Result (Top 10) ===
- Runners in italics were not competing with their full team

Rank	Name	Team	Time
1st place, gold medalist(s)	(Kenya) Jonah Koech	Iowa State	29:05
2nd place, silver medalist(s)	Shannon Butler	Montana State	29:11
3rd place, bronze medalist(s)	Bob Kennedy	Indiana	29:24
4	(United Kingdom) Jonathan Brown	Iowa State	29:26
5	Eric Henry	Arkansas	29:31
6	(Republic of Ireland) Sean Dollman	Western Kentucky	29:33
7	Andy Ball	Connecticut	29:34
8	Todd Williams	Tennessee	29:35
9	(Kenya) Samuel Kibiri	Washington State	29:40
10	Glenn Morgan	Tennessee	29:44

== Women's title ==
- Distance: 5,000 meters (3.11 miles)
- Competitors: 22 teams, 179 runners
- Full Results: MileSplit.com

=== Women's Team Result (Top 10) ===
Rank	Team	Points	Avg. Time
1st place, gold medalist(s)	Villanova	82	16:46
2nd place, silver medalist(s)	Providence	172	17:07
3rd place, bronze medalist(s)	Clemson	204	17:14
4	UC Irvine	210	17:15
5	Oregon	221	17:19
6	Arkansas	224	17:20
7	Georgetown	234	17:23
8	BYU	250	17:24
9	Georgia	264	17:26
10	Wisconsin	266	17:20

=== Women's Individual Result (Top 10) ===
- Runners in italics were not competing with their full team

Rank	Name	Team	Time
1st place, gold medalist(s)	(Republic of Ireland) Sonia O'Sullivan	Villanova	16:06
2nd place, silver medalist(s)	Suzy Favor-Hamilton	Wisconsin	16:18
3rd place, bronze medalist(s)	Susan Bliss; Buffy Rabbit	Missouri; UC Irvine	16:31
4	Mary Hartzhein	Wisconsin	16:33
5	Madeleine Alsgren; Anne Evans	Iowa State; Clemson	16:35
6	Natalie Nalepa	Baylor	16:39
7	(Netherlands) Wilma van Onna	UTEP	16:40
8	(Republic of Ireland) Sinead Delahunty	Providence	16:41
9	Keli Butler	Georgia	16:42
10	Darcy Arreola; Geraldine Hendricken	Cal State Northridge; Providence	16:44
