= 2021 NCAA Division I cross country championships =

2021 cross-country running meet of the NCAA (Division I)

2021 NCAA Division I Cross Country Championships
- Edition: 83rd–Men; 41st–Women
- Date: November 20, 2021
- Host city: Tallahassee, Florida
- Venue: Apalachee Regional Park
- Distances: 10 km–Men; 6 km–Women

The 2021 NCAA Division I Cross Country Championships was the 83rd edition of the annual NCAA Men's Division I Cross Country Championship and the 41st annual NCAA Women's Division I Cross Country Championship to determine the team and individual national champions of NCAA Division I men's and women's collegiate cross country running in the United States.

These championships were hosted by Florida State University at the Apalachee Regional Park in Tallahassee, Florida.

In all, four different titles where contested: men's and women's individual and team championships. Complete results for November 20, 2021 NCAA D1 Cross Country Championships.

== Women's title ==
- Distance: 6,000 meters
- (DC) = Defending champions

=== Women's Team Result (Top 10) ===
PL	Team	Total Time	Average Time	Score	1	2	3	4	5	(6)	(7)
1st place, gold medalist(s)	NC State	1:38:48	19:45	84	6	14	18	20	26	(75)	(122)
2nd place, silver medalist(s)	BYU	1:39:10	19:50	122	1	11	30	37	43	(131)	(135)
3rd place, bronze medalist(s)	New Mexico	1:39:27	19:53	130	15	17	28	32	38	(46)	(113)
4	Colorado	1:40:10	20:02	187	8	25	44	48	62	(68)	(76)
5	Notre Dame	1:40:23	20:04	215	9	10	51	65	80	(152)	(182)
6	Stanford	1:40:43	20:08	233	12	40	47	52	82	(127)	(176)
7	Minnesota	1:41:06	20:13	313	7	19	31	118	138	(188)	(194)
8	Arkansas	1:41:20	20:16	328	16	29	34	112	137	(146)	(149)
9	Iowa State	1:41:29	20:17	332	4	41	83	85	119	(172)	(181)
10	Ole Miss	1:41:48	20:21	350	27	58	60	63	142	(144)	(174)

=== Women's Individual Result (Top 10) ===
Rank	Name	Team	Time
1st place, gold medalist(s)	(United States) Whittni Orton Morgan	BYU	19:25.4
2nd place, silver medalist(s)	(Kenya) Mercy Chelangat	Alabama	19:29.3
3rd place, bronze medalist(s)	(Canada) Ceili McCabe	West Virginia	19:29.5
4	(United States) Cailie Logue	Iowa State	19:29.8
5	(United States) Taylor Roe	Oklahoma State	19:33.5
6	(United States) Kelsey Chmiel	NC State	19:34.6
7	(United States) Bethany Hasz	Minnesota	19:36.4
8	(United States) Abby Nichols	Colorado	19:37.6
9	(United States) Maddy Denner	Notre Dame	19:37.7
10	(United States) Kayley DeLay	Yale	19:37.7

== Men's title ==
- Distance: 10,000 meters

=== Men's Team Result (Top 10) ===
PL	Team	Total Time	Average Time	Score	1	2	3	4	5	6	7
1st place, gold medalist(s)	Northern Arizona	2:26:03	29:12	92	6	9	11	32	34	(97)	(136)
2nd place, silver medalist(s)	Iowa State	2:26:42	29:20	137	2	18	36	39	42	(57)	(99)
3rd place, bronze medalist(s)	Oklahoma State	2:27:56	29:35	186	19	23	25	51	68	(123)	(190)
4	Arkansas	2:27:52	29:34	195	10	13	14	50	108	(135)	(212)
5	Stanford	2:28:15	29:39	236	3	12	69	70	82	(105)	(162)
6	Tulsa	2:28:30	29:42	237	29	37	45	52	74	(124)	(131)
7	BYU	2:27:41	29:32	246	1	7	48	89	101	(147)	(192)
8	Colorado	2:28:44	29:44	249	21	40	54	61	73	(106)	(170)
9	Notre Dame	2:28:50	29:46	290	8	27	44	100	111	(132)	(134)
10	Wake Forest	2:29:59	29:59	356	16	64	76	88	112	(117)	(160)

=== Men's Individual Result (Top 10) ===
Rank	Name	Team	Time
1st place, gold medalist(s)	(United States) Conner Mantz	BYU	28:33.1
2nd place, silver medalist(s)	(Kenya) Wesley Kiptoo	Iowa State	28:38.7
3rd place, bronze medalist(s)	(Kenya) Athanas Kioko	Campbell	28:40.9
4	(United Kingdom) Charles Hicks	Stanford	28:47.2
5	(United States) Morgan Beadlescomb	Michigan State	28:50.6
6	(South Africa) Adriaan Wildschutt	Florida State	28:52.0
7	(United States) (Somalia) Abdihamid Nur	Northern Arizona	28:52.9
8	(United States) Casey Clinger	BYU	28:55.7
9	(Australia) Haftu Strintzos	Villanova	28:57.3
10	(United States) Dylan Jacobs	Notre Dame	28:57.5

== See also ==
- NCAA Men's Division II Cross Country Championship
- NCAA Women's Division II Cross Country Championship
- NCAA Men's Division III Cross Country Championship
- NCAA Women's Division III Cross Country Championship
