= 2017 NCAA Division I cross country championships =

2017 cross-country running meet of the NCAA (Division I)

2017 NCAA Division I Cross Country Championships
- Organisers: NCAA
- Edition: 79th–Men; 37th–Women
- Date: November 18, 2017
- Host city: (Kentucky) Louisville, KY
- Venue: University of Louisville; E. P. "Tom" Sawyer State Park
- Distances: 10 km–Men; 6 km–Women

Tense

Highlights Men's full race Women's full race

The 2017 NCAA Division I Cross Country Championships was the 79th annual NCAA Men's Division I Cross Country Championship and the 37th annual NCAA Women's Division I Cross Country Championship to determine the team and individual national champions of NCAA Division I men's and women's collegiate cross country running in the United States. In all, four different titles were contested: men's and women's individual and team championships.

Held on November 18, 2017, the combined meet was hosted by the University of Louisville at E. P. "Tom" Sawyer State Park in Louisville, Kentucky. The distance for the men's race was 10 kilometers (6.21 miles) while the distance for the women's race was 6 kilometers (3.73 miles).

== Women's title ==
- Distance: 6,000 meters
- (DC) = Defending champions

=== Women's Team Result (Top 10) ===
Rank	Team	Scorers					Points	Average Time
Rank	Team	1st	2nd	3rd	4th	5th	Points	Average Time
1st place, gold medalist(s)	New Mexico Lobos	1	6	9	11	63	90	19:51
2nd place, silver medalist(s)	San Francisco Dons	3	5	12	33	52	105	19:57
3rd place, bronze medalist(s)	Colorado Buffaloes	8	26	27	34	44	139	20:11
4	Stanford Cardinal	10	20	39	47	49	165	20:15
5	Oregon Ducks ^{(DC)}	13	16	25	68	81	203	20:17
6	Boise State Broncos	4	36	57	75	92	264	20:25
7	Furman Paladins	7	31	42	95	96	271	20:28
8	North Carolina State Wolfpack	24	37	40	61	118	280	20:31
9	Michigan Wolverines	17	21	70	73	114	295	20:31
10	Wisconsin Badgers	29	38	41	101	109	318	20:36

=== Women's Individual Result (Top 10) ===
Rank	Name	Team	Time	Points
1st place, gold medalist(s)	(Kenya) Ednah Kurgat	New Mexico Lobos	19:19.5	1
2nd place, silver medalist(s)	(United Kingdom) Amy-Eloise Neale	Washington Huskies	19:27.0	2
3rd place, bronze medalist(s)	(United Kingdom) Charlotte Taylor	San Francisco Dons	19:28.6	3
4	(United States) Allie Ostrander	Boise State Broncos	19:31.2	4
5	(Poland) Weronika Pyzik	San Francisco Dons	19:34.0	5
6	(Kenya) Caroline Sang	Charlotte 49ers	19:35.6	-
7	(Eritrea) Weini Kelati	New Mexico Lobos	19:35.8	6
8	(United States) Grayson Murphy	Utah Utes	19:36.3	-
9	(United States) Allie Buchalski	Furman Paladins	19:42.5	7
10	(United States) Dani Jones	Colorado Buffalos	19:47.0	8

== Men's title ==
- Distance: 10,000 meters
- (DC) = Defending champions

=== Men's Team Result (Top 10) ===
Rank	Team	Scorers					Points	Average Time
Rank	Team	1st	2nd	3rd	4th	5th	Points	Average Time
1st place, gold medalist(s)	Northern Arizona Lumberjacks ^{(DC)}	2	3	8	28	33	74	29:32
2nd place, silver medalist(s)	Portland Pilots	9	12	21	39	46	127	29:55
3rd place, bronze medalist(s)	BYU Cougars	20	23	32	35	55	165	30:01
4	Stanford Cardinal	5	14	15	69	118	221	30:02
5	Arkansas Razorbacks	11	36	43	72	97	259	30:17
6	Oregon Ducks	34	37	66	67	70	274	30:21
7	Iowa State Cyclones	13	45	58	81	82	279	30:21
8	Colorado Buffaloes	26	48	57	74	89	294	30:24
9	Colorado State Rams	25	49	75	77	92	318	30:27
10	Michigan Wolverines	18	41	61	103	105	328	30:27

=== Men's Individual Result (Top 10) ===
Rank	Name	Team	Time	Points
1st place, gold medalist(s)	(Canada) Justyn Knight	Syracuse	29:00.1	1
2nd place, silver medalist(s)	(New Zealand) Matthew Baxter	Northern Arizona Lumberjacks	29:00.8	2
3rd place, bronze medalist(s)	(United States) Tyler Day	Northern Arizona Lumberjacks	29:04.6	3
4	(Kenya) Gilbert Kigen	Alabama Crimson Tide	29:11.9	4
5	(United States) Grant Fisher	Stanford	29:12.1	5
6	(United States) Dillon Maggard	Utah State Aggies	29:16.2	6
7	(Kenya) Vincent Kiprop	Alabama Crimson Tide	29:27.2	7
8	(United States) Peter Lomong	Northern Arizona Lumberjacks	29:33.1	8
9	(Kenya) Lawrence Kipkoech	Campbell Camels	29:34.5	-
10	(United States) Jonathan Green	Georgetown	29:38.6	-

== See also ==
- NCAA Men's Division II Cross Country Championship
- NCAA Women's Division II Cross Country Championship
- NCAA Men's Division III Cross Country Championship
- NCAA Women's Division III Cross Country Championship
