= 1975 NCAA Division I cross country championships =

Cross-country running meet of the NCAA (Division I)

1975 NCAA Division I Men's Cross Country Championships
- Organisers: NCAA
- Edition: 37th
- Date: November 24, 1975
- Host city: State College, PA; Penn State University
- Venue: Penn State Golf Courses
- Distances: 6 miles (9.7 km)
- Participation: 268 athletes

The 1975 NCAA Division I Men's Cross Country Championships were the 37th annual cross country meet to determine the team and individual national champions of NCAA Division I men's collegiate cross country running in the United States. Held on November 24, 1975, the meet was hosted by Penn State University at the Penn State Golf Courses in State College, Pennsylvania. The distance for this race was 6 miles (9.7 kilometers). This was the final national meet at this distance.

All Division I members were eligible to qualify for the meet. In total, 32 teams and 268 individual runners contested this championship.

The team national championship was won by the UTEP Miners, their second title. The individual championship was won by Craig Virgin, from Illinois, with a time of 28:23.30.

== Men's title ==
- Distance: 6 miles (9.7 kilometers)

=== Team Result (Top 10) ===
Rank	Team	Points
1st place, gold medalist(s)	UTEP	88
2nd place, silver medalist(s)	Washington State	92
3rd place, bronze medalist(s)	Providence	183
4	Penn State	256
5	East Tennessee State	268
6	Western Kentucky	271
7	BYU	292
8	Colorado State	300
9	Wisconsin	301
10	Illinois	312

== See also ==
- NCAA Men's Division II Cross Country Championship
- NCAA Men's Division III Cross Country Championship
