= Stan Huntsman =

American track and field (athletics) coach

Stanley Houser Huntsman (March 20, 1932 – November 23, 2016) was an American track and field (athletics) coach. He was a men's assistant coach during the 1976 Summer Olympics and the men's head coach of the American team of the 1988 Summer Olympics. He would have been assistant coach during the 1980 Summer Olympics, but the American team did not compete due to a boycott. He was also the head coach of the 1993 World Championships in Helsinki. The American team won six gold medals and a total of 18 medals together, both the most by any nation. At the 1988 Summer Olympics the American team won seven gold medals, the most in track and field for any nation. He was elected to the National Track and Field Hall of Fame in 2004.

Huntsman was a coach at the Ohio University (1957–70), University of Tennessee (1971–85) and University of Texas (1985–95). At Tennessee, his athletes won N.C.A.A. team championships in cross-country (1972) and outdoor track (1974) and 31 Southeastern Conference team titles, and he was named N.C.A.A. national coach of the year six times.

He was Inducted into the Texas Track and Field Coaches Association Hall of Fame, Class of 2017.

== Personal ==
He was raised in Indiana and starred in American football and track and field at Wabash College, where his father, Owen, was the track coach. He was offered a contract to play professional football for the Chicago Cardinals, which he turned down. He earned a bachelor's degree from Wabash in 1954 and a master's from Ohio in 1956. He was married with Sylvia Scalzi. They had a son (Stanley Stephen), a daughter (Constance Huntsman Stogner) and three grandchildren. Huntsman died at the age of 84 on 23 November 2016 from complications of a stroke he had two years before. His brother was Jerry Huntsman, who was a very successful football coach and athletic administrator at Indiana State.
