= 2014 NCAA Division I cross country championships =

2014 cross-country running meet of the NCAA (Division I)

2014 NCAA Division I Cross Country Championships
- Dates: November 22, 2014
- Host city: Terre Haute, Indiana; Indiana State University
- Venue: LaVern Gibson Cross Country Course
- Events: 4

The 2014 NCAA Division I Cross Country Championships were the 76th NCAA Men's Division I Cross Country Championship and the 34th NCAA Women's Division I Cross Country Championship held at the LaVern Gibson Cross Country Course in Terre Haute, Indiana near the campus of Indiana State University on November 22, 2014. Four different cross country running championships were contested: men's and women's individual and team championships.

On the men's side, the team national championship was won by the Colorado Buffaloes, their fifth, and second consecutive, title, while the individual championship was won by Edward Cheserek, his second consecutive title, from Oregon. On the women's side, the team championship was won by the Michigan State Spartans, their first title, and the individual championship was won by Kate Avery of Iona, her first title.

== Men's title ==
- Distance: 10,000 meters

=== Men's Team Result (Top 10) ===
Rank	Team	Points
1st place, gold medalist(s)	Colorado	65
2nd place, silver medalist(s)	Stanford	98
3rd place, bronze medalist(s)	Portland	175
4	Northern Arizona	188
5	Syracuse	206
6	Oregon	221
7	Villanova	230
8	Iona	270
9	Oklahoma State	296
10	Wisconsin	335

=== Men's Individual Result (Top 10) ===
Rank	Name	Team	Time
1st place, gold medalist(s)	(Kenya) Edward Cheserek	Oregon	30:19.4
2nd place, silver medalist(s)	(United States) Eric Jenkins	Oregon	30:23.2
3rd place, bronze medalist(s)	(Eritrea) (United States) Futsum Zienasellassie	Northern Arizona	30:25.3
4	(United States) Maksim Korolev	Stanford	30:29.5
5	(United States) Ammar Moussa	Colorado	30:29.6
6	(Kenya) (United States) Stanley Kebenei	Arkansas	30:30.1
7	(United States) Ben Saarel	Colorado	30:30.7
8	(United States) John Mascari	Indiana State	30:30.9
9	(United States) Blake Theroux	Colorado	30:31.7
10	(United States) Malachy Schrobilgen	Wisconsin	30:32.6

== Women's title ==
- Distance: 6,000 meters

=== Women's Team Result (Top 10) ===
Rank	Team	Points
1st place, gold medalist(s)	Michigan State	85
2nd place, silver medalist(s)	Iowa State	147
3rd place, bronze medalist(s)	New Mexico	188
4	Georgetown	189
5	Arkansas	209
6	Oregon	249
7	Colorado	267
8	West Virginia	277
9	Iona	377
10	Wisconsin	382

=== Women's Individual Result (Top 10) ===
Rank	Name	Team	Time
1st place, gold medalist(s)	(United Kingdom) Kate Avery	Iona	19:31.6
2nd place, silver medalist(s)	(United States) Sarah Disanza	Wisconsin	19:39.9
3rd place, bronze medalist(s)	(United States) Emma Bates	Boise State	19:44.5
4	(United States) Rachele Schulist	Michigan State	19:54.3
5	(United States) Rachel Johnson	Baylor	19:56.8
6	(South Africa) (United States) Dominique Scott	Arkansas	20:01.3
7	(United States) Crystal Nelson	Iowa State	20:08.5
8	(United States) Katy Moen	Iowa State	20:10.5
9	(United States) Shelby Houlihan	Arizona State	20:11.4
10	(United States) Chelsea Blaase	Tennessee	20:11.6

== See also ==
- NCAA Men's Division I Cross Country Championship
- NCAA Women's Division I Cross Country Championship
