= Joseph Kipsang =

Kenyan long-distance runner

Personal information
- Nationality: Kenyan
- Born: Joseph Kipsang Metet; 25 September 1962 (age 63) Rongai, Kenya
- Education: Iowa State University, Howard University.

Sport
- Sport: Long-distance running
- Event: Marathon
- College team: The Iowa State Cyclones

Joseph Kipsang (born 25 September 1962) is a Kenyan long-distance runner. He competed in the men's marathon at the 1988 Summer Olympics. He is a four-time All-American representing The Cyclones, Iowa State University's athletic teams. Kipsang was an alternate for Kenya in the 10,000 meters at the Los Angeles Olympic Games of 1984.Even after half a dozen U.S. colleges expressed interest, Kipsang's parents wanted him to attend Nairobi University, where he was accepted. When Kipsang was 18, after twice winning the national championship at 5,000 meters, U.S. coaches were more than interested. Idaho made a strong pitch. Iowa State coach Bill Bergen made daily phone calls. Finally, Kipsang chose to go to Iowa State, thinking it was Idaho because he said the coach told him it was warm there. After studies at Iowa, he worked at the Kenyan embassy in Washington and enrolled for Howard University's economic development program.

In October 12, 1985, Kipsang won the Stroh's Run For Liberty II in downtown Washington. The race was to benefit the restoration of the Statue of Liberty. Kipsang participated in 5000 Metres, 10,000 Metres, 15 Kilometres, 10 Miles Road, 20 Kilometres and Marathon.
