= 1980 NCAA Division I cross country championships =

1980 cross-country running meet of the NCAA (Division I)

1980 NCAA Division I Men's Cross Country Championships
- Organisers: NCAA
- Edition: 42nd
- Date: November 24, 1980
- Host city: Park City, KS; Wichita State University
- Venue: Echo Hills Golf Course
- Distances: 10 km (6.21 mi)
- Participation: 243 athletes

The 1980 NCAA Division I Men's Cross Country Championships were the 42nd annual cross country meet to determine the team and individual national champions of NCAA Division I men's collegiate cross country running in the United States. Held on November 24, 1980, the meet was hosted by Wichita State University at the Echo Hills Golf Course in Park City, Kansas. The distance for this race was 10 kilometers (6.21 miles).

This was the final year of a singular men's championship. Starting in 1981, the NCAA Women's Division I Cross Country Championship was added and held at the same site as the men's championship each subsequent year.

All Division I cross country teams were eligible to qualify for the meet through their placement at various regional qualifying meets. In total, 29 teams and 243 individual runners contested this championship.

The team national championship was retained again by the UTEP Miners, their sixth, and third consecutive, overall title. The individual championship was won by Suleiman Nyambui, also from UTEP, with a time of 20:04.00.

== Men's title ==
- Distance: 10,000 meters (6.21 miles)

=== Team Result (Top 10) ===
Rank	Team	Points
1st place, gold medalist(s)	UTEP	58
2nd place, silver medalist(s)	Arkansas	152
3rd place, bronze medalist(s)	Penn State	153
4	East Tennessee State	189
5	UCLA	207
6	Western Kentucky	233
7	Michigan	243
8	Clemson	287
9	Villanova	298
10	Iowa State	303

=== Individual Result (Top 10) ===
Rank	Name	Nationality	Time
1st place, gold medalist(s)	(Tanzania) Suleiman Nyambui	UTEP	29:04.00
2nd place, silver medalist(s)	(South Africa) Matthews Motshwarateu	UTEP	29:06.40
3rd place, bronze medalist(s)	(Kenya) Solomon Chebor	Fairleigh Dickinson	29:08.40
4	(Kenya) James Rotich	UTEP	29:13.90
5	(Australia) Garry Henry	Pembroke State	29:14.60
6	(United Kingdom) Mark Scrutton	Colorado	29:20.70
7	(United States) Alan Scharsu	Penn State	29:25.20
8	(United States) Mark Andersen	Arkansas	29:27.40
9	(United States) Dan Heikkinen	Michigan	29:28.00
10	(United States) David Taylor	Arkansas	29:32.80

== See also ==
- NCAA Men's Division II Cross Country Championship
- NCAA Men's Division III Cross Country Championship
