= 1991 NCAA Division I cross country championships =

1991 cross-country running meet of the NCAA (Division I)

1991 NCAA Division I Cross Country Championships
- Organisers: NCAA
- Edition: 53rd–Men; 11th–Women
- Date: November 25, 1991
- Host city: Tucson, AZ; University of Arizona
- Venue: El Conquistador Country Club
- Distances: 10 km–Men; 5 km–Women
- Participation: 177–Men; 179–Women; 356–Total athletes

The 1991 NCAA Division I Cross Country Championships were the 53rd annual NCAA Men's Division I Cross Country Championship and the 11th annual NCAA Women's Division I Cross Country Championship to determine the team and individual national champions of NCAA Division I men's and women's collegiate cross country running in the United States. In all, four different titles were contested: men's and women's individual and team championships.

Held on November 25, 1991, the combined meet was hosted by the University of Arizona at El Conquistador Country Club in Tucson, Arizona. The distance for the men's race was 10 kilometers (6.21 miles) while the distance for the women's race was 5 kilometers (3.11 miles).

The men's team national championship was again won by Arkansas, their fifth (and second consecutive) team national title. The individual championship was won by Sean Dollman, from Western Kentucky, with a time of 30:17.1.

The women's team national championship was likewise retained by Villanova, their third national title. Villanova's Sonia O'Sullivan also repeated as individual national champion with a time of 16:30.3.

== Qualification ==
- All Division I cross country teams were eligible to qualify for the meet through their placement at various regional qualifying meets. In total, 22 teams and 177 runners contested the men's championship while 22 teams and 179 runners contested the women's title.

== Men's title ==
- Distance: 10,000 meters (6.21 miles)
- Competitors: 22 teams, 177 runners
- Full Results: MileSplit.com

=== Men's Team Result (Top 10) ===
Rank	Team	Points	Scorers	Avg. Time
1st place, gold medalist(s)	Arkansas	51	1 + 2 + 6 + 10 + 32	30:57
2nd place, silver medalist(s)	Wisconsin	148	19 + 20 + 22 + 41 + 46	31:38
3rd place, bronze medalist(s)	Iowa State	228	4 + 9 + 25 + 55 + 135	31:58
4	Weber State	229	21 + 26 + 31 + 75 + 76	31:57
5	Arizona (H)	231	3 + 30 + 37 + 54 + 107	31:56
6	Michigan	239	13 + 28 + 50 + 61 + 87	31:55
7	Kansas State	245	18 + 51 + 56 + 57 + 63	31:59
8	Texas	258	23 + 33 + 59 + 60 + 83	32:05
9	Penn State	280	17 + 35 + 68 + 72 + 88	32:07
10	NC State	284	14 + 38 + 66 + 73 + 93	32:09

- (H) – Host team

=== Men's Individual Result (Top 10) ===
- Runners in italics were not competing with their full team

Rank	Name	Team	Time
1st place, gold medalist(s)	(Republic of Ireland) Sean Dollman	Western Kentucky	30:17.1
2nd place, silver medalist(s)	(Republic of Ireland) Niall Bruton	Arkansas	30:35.3
3rd place, bronze medalist(s)	Brian Baker	Arkansas	30:36.9
4	(Kenya) Martin Keino	Arizona	30:39.6
5	(Kenya) Jonah Koech	Iowa State	30:39.7
6	Anthony Hamm	Michigan State	30:42.6
7	(Canada) Graham Hood	Arkansas	30:44.9
8	(Kenya) Josephat Kapkory	Washington State	30:49.8
9	Richard Wemple	Yale	30:50.3
10	Steve Holman	Georgetown	30:53.2

== Women's title ==
- Distance: 5,000 meters (3.11 miles)
- Competitors: 22 teams, 179 runners
- Full Results: MileSplit.com

=== Women's Team Result (Top 10) ===
Rank	Team	Points	Scorers	Avg. Time
1st place, gold medalist(s)	Villanova	85	1 + 2 + 10 + 23 + 49	17:05
2nd place, silver medalist(s)	Arkansas	168	20 + 21 + 29 + 30 + 68	17:40
3rd place, bronze medalist(s)	Northern Arizona	184	14 + 19 + 25 + 44 + 82	17:42
4	Cornell	189	6 + 9 + 46 + 55 + 73	17:40
5	Oregon	191	3 + 8 + 33 + 54 + 93	17:39
6	Georgetown; Wisconsin	193	13 + 16 + 36 + 56 + 59; 24 + 26 + 28 + 35 + 80	17:46; 17:48
7	NC State	202	4 + 34 + 42 + 60 + 62	17:46
8	Providence	212	7 + 12 + 57 + 61 + 75	17:47
9	Baylor	258	5 + 43 + 53 + 66 + 91	17:57
10	Arizona (H)	294	47 + 48 + 51 + 52 + 96	18:05

- (H) – Host team

=== Women's Individual Result (Top 10) ===
- Runners in italics were not competing with their full team

Rank	Name	Team	Time
1st place, gold medalist(s)	(Republic of Ireland) Sonia O'Sullivan	Villanova	16:30.3
2nd place, silver medalist(s)	Carole Zajac	Villanova	16:34.9
3rd place, bronze medalist(s)	Lisa Karnopp	Oregon	16:47.3
4	Laurie Gomez-Henes	NC State	16:49.9
5	Natalie Nalepa	Baylor	16:53.2
6	Pamela Hunt	Cornell	16:56.7
7	Geraldine Hendricken	Providence	16:58.0
8	Lucy Nusrala	Oregon	16:59.3
9	Jennifer Cobb	Cornell	17:00.4
10	Sandy Ham	Colorado State	17:02.1
