= 1974 NCAA Division I cross country championships =

1974 cross-country running meet of the NCAA (Division I)

1974 NCAA Division I Men's Cross Country Championships
- Organisers: NCAA
- Edition: 36th
- Date: November 26, 1974
- Host city: Bloomington, IN; Indiana University
- Venue: IU Cross Country Course
- Distances: 6 miles (9.7 km)
- Participation: 250 athletes

The 1974 NCAA Division I Men's Cross Country Championships were the 36th annual cross country meet to determine the team and individual national champions of NCAA Division I men's collegiate cross country running in the United States. Held on November 26, 1974, the meet was hosted by Indiana University at the IU Cross Country Course in Bloomington, Indiana. The distance for this race was 6 miles (9.7 kilometers).

All Division I members were eligible to qualify for the meet. In total, 28 teams and 250 individual runners contested this championship.

The team national championship was retained by the Oregon Ducks, their third overall, and second consecutive, title. The individual championship was won by Nick Rose, from Western Kentucky, with a time of 29:22.00.

== Men's title ==
- Distance: 6 miles (9.7 kilometers)

=== Team Result (Top 10) ===
Rank	Team	Points
1st place, gold medalist(s)	Oregon	75
2nd place, silver medalist(s)	UTEP	132
3rd place, bronze medalist(s)	Washington State	140
4	Western Kentucky	178
5	Providence	221
6	Eastern Michigan	224
7	Georgetown	238
8	Massachusetts	252
9	Wisconsin	253
10	Penn State	274

== See also ==
- NCAA Men's Division II Cross Country Championship
- NCAA Men's Division III Cross Country Championship
