= 2023 NCAA Division I cross country championships =

2023 NCAA Division I Cross Country Championships
- Edition: 85th–Men; 43rd–Women
- Date: Saturday, November 18, 2023
- Host city: Charlottesville, Virginia
- Venue: Panorama Farms
- Distances: 10 km–Men; 6 km–Women

The 2023 NCAA Division I Cross Country Championships were the 85th annual NCAA Men's Division I Cross Country Championship and the 43rd annual NCAA Women's Division I Cross Country Championship, and determined the team and individual national champions of NCAA Division I men's and women's collegiate cross country running in the United States.

These championships were hosted by the University of Virginia at the Panorama Farms in Charlottesville, Virginia.

In all, four different titles were contested: men's and women's individual and team championships.

== Women's Team Result (Top 10) ==
PL	Team	Total Time	Average Time	Score	1	2	3	4	5	(6)	(7)
1st place, gold medalist(s)	NC State	1:39:51	19:58	123	5	18	21	31	48	(55)	(76)
2nd place, silver medalist(s)	Northern Arizona	1:39:36	19:55	124	11	13	15	41	44	(47)	(58)
3rd place, bronze medalist(s)	Oklahoma State	1:40:19	19:55	156	7	16	24	35	74	(80)	(140)
4	Notre Dame	1:40:58	20:11	237	3	25	26	87	96	(111)	(142)
5	Florida	1:40:39	20:07	268	1	6	36	57	168	(207)	
6	Tennessee	1:42:30	20:30	294	30	54	56	68	86	(101)	(156)
7	Alabama	1:41:00	20:12	314	2	4	40	129	139	(165)	(206)
8	Washington	1:42:27	20:29	323	34	43	45	91	110	(158)	(175)
9	Arkansas	1:42:24	20:28	329	10	64	71	75	109	(188)	(191)
10	Oregon	1:42:40	20:32	335	29	39	78	85	104	(171)	(201)

== Women's Individual Result (Top 10) ==
Position	Name	Team	Time
1st place, gold medalist(s)	Parker Valby	Florida	18:55.2
2nd place, silver medalist(s)	Doris Lemngole	Alabama	19:05.7
3rd place, bronze medalist(s)	Olivia Markezich	Notre Dame	19:10.0
4	Hilda Olemomoi	Alabama	19:22.1
5	Katelyn Tuohy	NC State	19:23.0
6	Flomena Asekol	Florida	19:26.9
7	Billah Jepkirui	Oklahoma State	19:27.5
8	Chloe Scrimgeour	Georgetown	19:28.4
9	Amina Maatoug	Duke	19:29.9
10	Maia Ramsden	Harvard	19:30.8

== Men's Team Result (Top 10) ==
PL	Team	Total Time	Average Time	Score	1	2	3	4	5	(6)	(7)
1st place, gold medalist(s)	Oklahoma State	2:25:59	29:11	49	4	8	10	12	15	(43)	(70)
2nd place, silver medalist(s)	Northern Arizona	2:26:45	29:21	71	5	6	18	20	22	(51)	(69)
3rd place, bronze medalist(s)	BYU	2:25:35	29:55	196	27	30	39	48	52	(147)	
4	Arkansas	2:29:19	29:51	211	7	13	36	72	83		
5	Iowa State	2:29:54	29:58	230	16	31	37	47	99	(143)	(190)
6	North Carolina	2:30:00	30:00	249	9	17	38	64	121	(194)	(201)
7	Texas	2:30:14	30:02	262	11	21	65	78	87	(169)	(173)
8	Stanford	2:30:34	30:06	291	3	42	61	80	105	(151)	(191)
9	Syracuse	2:30:54	30:10	299	19	29	73	88	90	(193)	
10	Wisconsin	2:31:41	30:20	330	35	57	62	68	108	(154)	

== Men's Individual Result (Top 10) ==
Position	Name	Team	Time
1st place, gold medalist(s)	Graham Blanks	Harvard	28:37.7
2nd place, silver medalist(s)	Habtom Samuel	New Mexico	28:40.7
3rd place, bronze medalist(s)	Ky Robinson	Stanford	28:55.7
4	Denis Kipngetich	Oklahoma State	28:59.7
5	Drew Bosley	Northern Arizona	29:03.8
6	Nico Young	Northern Arizona	29:04.2
7	Patrick Kiprop	Arkansas	29:07.7
8	Brian Musau	Oklahoma State	29:11.0
9	Parker Wolfe	North Carolina	29:12.6
10	Fouad Messaoudi	Oklahoma State	29:13.3

== See also ==
- NCAA Men's Division II Cross Country Championship
- NCAA Women's Division II Cross Country Championship
- NCAA Men's Division III Cross Country Championship
- NCAA Women's Division III Cross Country Championship

== Results ==
- 2023 NCAA Division I Cross Country Championships live results
- 2023 NCAA Division I Cross Country Championships TFRRS results
