= 1995 NCAA Division I cross country championships =

1995 cross-country running meet of the NCAA (Division I)

1995 NCAA Division I Cross Country Championships
- Organisers: NCAA
- Edition: 57th–Men; 15th–Women
- Date: November 20, 1995
- Host city: (Iowa) Ames, IA
- Venue: Iowa State University
- Distances: 10 km–Men; 5 km–Women
- Participation: 177–Men; 183–Women; 360–Total athletes

The 1995 NCAA Division I Cross Country Championships were the 57th annual NCAA Men's Division I Cross Country Championship and the 15th annual NCAA Women's Division I Cross Country Championship to determine the team and individual national champions of NCAA Division I men's and women's collegiate cross country running in the United States. In all, four different titles were contested: men's and women's individual and team championships.

Held on November 20, 1995, the combined meet was hosted by Iowa State University in Ames, Iowa. The distance for the men's race was 10 kilometers (6.21 miles) while the distance for the women's race was 5 kilometers (3.11 miles).

The men's team championship was won by Arkansas (100 points), their eighth overall title and first since winning four consecutive titles between 1990 and 1993. The women's team championship was won by Providence (88 points), their first.

The two individual champions were Godfrey Siamusiye (Arkansas, 30:09) and Kathy Butler (Wisconsin, 16:51).

== Men's title ==
- Distance: 10,000 meters

=== Men's Team Result (Top 10) ===
Rank	Team	Points
1st place, gold medalist(s)	Arkansas	100
2nd place, silver medalist(s)	Northern Arizona	142
3rd place, bronze medalist(s)	Oklahoma State	150
4	Colorado	151
5	Stanford	209
6	Georgetown	210
7	Oregon	228
8	Notre Dame; Providence	237
10	BYU	254

=== Men's Individual Result (Top 10) ===
Rank	Name	Team	Time
1st place, gold medalist(s)	(Zambia) Godfrey Siamusiye	Arkansas	30:00
2nd place, silver medalist(s)	(Republic of Ireland) Mark Carroll	Providence	30:45
3rd place, bronze medalist(s)	(United States) Eric Mack	Air Force	30:46
4	(Kenya) Patrick Kiptum	Oklahoma State	30:54
5	(United States) Ryan Wilson	Arkansas	30:57
6	(United States) Adam Goucher	Colorado	30:58
7	(United States) Tony Cosey	Tennessee	30:59
8	(Canada) Kevin Sullivan	Michigan	30:59
9	(United States) Meb Keflezighi	UCLA	31:00
10	(United Kingdom) Jon Wild	Oklahoma State	31:01

== Women's title ==
- Distance: 5,000 meters

=== Women's Team Result (Top 10) ===
Rank	Team	Points
1st place, gold medalist(s)	Providence	88
2nd place, silver medalist(s)	Colorado	123
3rd place, bronze medalist(s)	Villanova	151
4	BYU	154
5	Oregon	174
6	Arizona	186
7	Michigan	199
8	Georgetown	228
9	Stanford	235
10	Wisconsin	255

=== Women's Individual Result (Top 10) ===
Rank	Name	Team	Time
1st place, gold medalist(s)	(Canada) Kathy Butler	Wisconsin	16:51
2nd place, silver medalist(s)	(United States) Amy Skieresz	Arizona	16:55
3rd place, bronze medalist(s)	(United States) Jennifer Rhines	Villanova	17:02
4	(Republic of Ireland) Marie McMahon	Providence	17:09
5	(United States) Mary Cobb	Stanford	17:18
6	(Republic of Ireland) Marie McCambridge	Providence	17:22
7	(United States) Carrie Tollefson	Villanova	17:22
8	(United States) Tara Carlson	Washington	17:26
9	(United States) Melody Fairchild	Oregon	17:28
10	(Australia) Katie Swords	Southern Methodist	17:29
