= 1973 NCAA Division I cross country championships =

1973 cross-country running meet of the NCAA (Division I)

Coordinates: 47.541°N 117.379°W

1973 NCAA Division I Cross Country Championships
- Organisers: NCAA
- Edition: 35th
- Date: November 19, 1973
- Host city: Spokane, Washington (Washington State University)
- Venue: Hangman Valley Golf Course
- Distances: 6 miles (9.66 km)
- Participation: 210 athletes

Location in the United States
Location in Washington

The 1973 NCAA Division I Cross Country Championships were the 35th annual cross country meet to determine the team and individual national champions of NCAA Division I men's collegiate cross country running in the United States. Held on November 19, it was hosted by Washington State University at Hangman Valley Golf Course, near Spokane, Washington.

The distance for this race was 6 miles (9.66 km), and the approximate average elevation was 1,900 feet (580 m) above sea level. The temperature during the race was 38 °F (3 °C).

The team national championship was won by the Oregon Ducks, their second title.

The individual championship was won by Oregon's Steve Prefontaine, with a time of 28:14.80. This was Prefontaine's third individual title in four years. Along with Gerry Lindgren (1966, 1967, and 1969) and Henry Rono (1976, 1977, and 1979), both from Washington State, Prefontaine is one of only three Division I collegiate runners with three individual titles.

Washington State hosted the championship again four years later in 1977, also at Hangman Valley, south of the city.

== Qualification ==
All Division I members were eligible to qualify for the meet. In total, 22 teams and 210 individual runners contested this championship. This was the first championship after the NCAA rebranded the former University Division as Division I in 1973. On a related note, the inaugural NCAA Men's Division III Cross Country Championship was held this year at Wheaton College in Wheaton, Illinois.

== Men's title ==
- Distance: 6 miles (9.66 km)

=== Team Result (Top 10) ===
Rank	Team	Points
1st place, gold medalist(s)	Oregon	89
2nd place, silver medalist(s)	UTEP	157
3rd place, bronze medalist(s)	Washington State	166
4	William & Mary	174
5	Colorado	198
6	Oklahoma State	204
7	East Tennessee State	247
8	Wisconsin	251
9	Penn State	253
10	Indiana	254

== See also ==
- NCAA Men's Division II Cross Country Championship
- NCAA Men's Division III Cross Country Championship (began in 1973)
