= 1985 NCAA Division I cross country championships =

1985 cross-country running meet of the NCAA (Division I)

1985 NCAA Division I Cross Country Championships
- Organisers: NCAA
- Edition: 47th (Men); 5th (Women)
- Date: November 25, 1985
- Host city: Milwaukee, Wisconsin; Marquette University
- Distances: 10 km–Men; 5 km–Women
- Participation: 181–Men; 129–Women; 310–Total athletes

The 1985 NCAA Division I Cross Country Championships were the 47th annual NCAA Men's Division I Cross Country Championship and the 5th annual NCAA Women's Division I Cross Country Championship to determine the team and individual national champions of NCAA Division I men's and women's collegiate cross country running in the United States. In all, four different titles were contested: men's and women's individual and team championships.

Held on November 25, 1985, the combined meet was hosted by Marquette University in Milwaukee, Wisconsin. The distance for the men's race was 10 kilometers (6.21 miles) while the distance for the women's race was 5 kilometers (3.11 miles).

The men's team national championship was won by Wisconsin, their second national title. The individual championship was won by Tim Hacker, from Wisconsin, with a time of 29:17.88.

The women's team national championship was also won by Wisconsin, their second national title. The individual championship was won by Suzie Tuffey, from NC State, with a time of 16:22.53.

== Qualification ==
- All Division I cross country teams were eligible to qualify for the meet through their placement at various regional qualifying meets. In total, 22 teams and 181 runners contested the men's championship while 16 teams and 129 runners contested the women's title.

== Men's title ==
- Distance: 10,000 meters (6.21 miles)

=== Men's Team Result (Top 10) ===
Rank	Team	Points
1st place, gold medalist(s)	Wisconsin	67
2nd place, silver medalist(s)	Arkansas	104
3rd place, bronze medalist(s)	Colorado	167
4	Arizona	175
5	North Carolina	200
6	Iowa State	228
7	Navy	233
8	Boston University	235
9	Montana	251
10	Northeastern	270

=== Men's Individual Result (Top 10) ===
Rank	Name	Team	Time
1st place, gold medalist(s)	(United States) Tim Hacker	Wisconsin	29:17.88
2nd place, silver medalist(s)	(Kenya) Yobes Ondieki	Iowa State	29:29.32
3rd place, bronze medalist(s)	(United States) Keith Hanson	Marquette	29:47.01
4	(Canada) Marc Oleson	Stanford	29:52.67
5	(South Africa) Jean Verster	Nebraska	29:53.77
6	(United States) Dean Crowe	Boston University	30:00.00
7	(United States) Joe Falcon	Arkansas	30:01.11
8	(Belgium) Raf Wyns	Iowa State	30:02.35
9	(United States) Eric Carter	Penn State	30:03.84
10	(United States) Senpird Dunne	East Tennessee State	30:05.23

== Women's title ==
- Distance: 5,000 meters (3.11 miles)

=== Women's Team Result (Top 10) ===
Rank	Team	Points
1st place, gold medalist(s)	Wisconsin	58
2nd place, silver medalist(s)	Iowa State	98
3rd place, bronze medalist(s)	NC State	103
4	Kentucky	118
5	Texas	143
6	UCLA	222
7	Washington State; Kansas State	227
8	BYU	244
9	Penn State	253
10	Oregon	264

=== Women's Individual Result (Top 10) ===
Rank	Name	Team	Time
1st place, gold medalist(s)	(United States) Suzie Tuffey	NC State	16:22.53
2nd place, silver medalist(s)	(United States) Regina Jacobs	Stanford	16:29.20
3rd place, bronze medalist(s)	(United States) Christine McMiken	Oklahoma State	16:30.00
4	(United States) Polly Plumer	UCLA	16:31.80
5	(United States) Elizabeth Natalie	Texas	16:32.30
6	(United States) Jenny Stricker	Harvard	16:34.10
7	(United States) Stephanie Herbst	Wisconsin	16:36.80
8	(Canada) Angela Chalmers	Northern Arizona	16:36.90
9	(United States) Nora Collas	Houston	16:41.90
10	(United States) Janet Smith	NC State	16:43.60

== See also ==
- NCAA Men's Cross Country Championships (Division II, Division III)
- NCAA Women's Cross Country Championships (Division II, Division III)
