= Betsy Saina =

American long-distance runner from Kenya

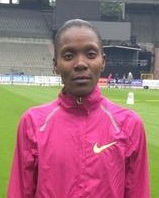
- Betsy Saina in August 2014

Personal information
- Born: 30 June 1988 (age 38) Kenya
- Height: 5 ft 6 in (1.68 m)

Sport
- Country: United States
- Sport: Athletics
- Events: 5000 metres, 10,000 metres, Half marathon, Marathon
- College team: Iowa State Cyclones
- Turned pro: 2013

Achievements and titles
- Olympic finals: 2016
- Personal bests: 3000 m: 8:38.01 (Brussels 2014); 5000 m: 14:39.49 (Monaco 2014); 10000 m: 30:07.78 (Rio de Janeiro 2016); Half marathon: 1:07:49 (Marugame 2019); Marathon: 2:19:17 (Tokyo 2024)
Medal record
Women's athletics
Representing Kenya
African Championships
Bronze medal – third place	2012 Porto-Novo	10,000 m

Betsy Saina (born 30 June 1988) is a Kenyan-American athlete in long distance running. She was born in Kenya and now competes for the United States.

== Early life ==
Saina was born in Kenya on 30 June 1988. She began running as a teenager in Eldoret, Kenya with hopes to pursue education at Itigo Girls High School. Her family had success in distance running, so her sisters mentored her as a youth to prepare her for a national stage of running. Her performance at the African juniors national championship caught the attention of scouts and recruiters. "Saina grew up in Kenya's middle class – "not poor, or rich," she says – with a father who worked as an elementary-school teacher and mother who operated a small business."

== Iowa State ==
In her five years at Iowa State University in Ames, Iowa, Saina earned an agriculture and life sciences degree with a focus on nursing. She won the 2012 National Collegiate Athletic Association (NCAA) Cross Country Championship, 5,000 meters at the 2012 NCAA Indoor Championship and 10,000 meters at the 2013 Outdoor NCAA Championship under the guidance of coach Corey Ihmels.

Saina ran at the 2009 NCAA cross country championships and finished 141st in 21:35. Three years later, she has improved her 6K time by two minutes – and everyone is following behind Saina. In her final year of eligibility, Saina took the top spot at this year's NCAA championships in a time of 19:27.9"

She set at the time world-leading marks of 31:15.97 in the 10 km and school records of 15:12.05 in the 5k. Saina was the 2011–2012 Iowa State Cyclones Female Student-Athlete of the year and received this honour in front of 61,000 fans at the football home opener on 1 September 2012. Saina was also a nine-time Big 12 Champion and an 11-time All-American runner. She was also named Athlete of the Year by the Track and Field Cross Country Coaches Association her senior season in 2013. Betsy Saina was honoured on 31 August 2013 as the 2013 Iowa State Female Athlete of the Year! She won the Honda Sports Award as the nation's best female collegiate cross country runner in 2013.

== Professional ==
=== Nike Colorado Springs ===
Saina competed on the roads and on the track based out of Colorado Springs for the professional training group American Distance Project elite 2013 through October 2015 under the guidance of coach Scott Simmons.

2014
In January 2014, she ran a world leading indoor 5,000 meters time.

In March 2014, Saina finished second in 15:22 at the Carlsbad 5000 five kilometre road race behind Julia Bleasdale. Saina is the only person based in the US who ranks in the top 15 of the world in the 10,000 meters in 2013 except Shalane Flanagan.

Competing in the 10,000 meters at the Payton Jordan Invitational on 4 May 2014, she improved her personal best 10 km time to under 31 minutes running 30:57.30. Saina is one of seven women living in the United States including Deena Kastor, Kim Smith, Shalane Flanagan, Kara Goucher, Sally Kipyego and Molly Huddle to have run a 10 km race under 31 minutes. Only 69 women have ever run under 31 minutes.

On 18 July, Competing in the 5,000 meters at the Diamond League Herculis Monaco, Saina improved her personal best 5 km time to under 14:40 minutes running 14:39.49 [43rd all-time best performer.

In August 2014, Saina won the woman's division of the 42nd New Balance Falmouth Road Race with a time of 35:56 on the 7-mile (11 km) course.

On 8 September 2014, Saina won a road 10k in Tilburg, the Netherlands running 30:45 and her time is the fastest road 10 km in 2014.

On 12 October 2014, Saina finished 4th in her debut at the Boston half marathon in a time of 1:09:27. 69:27 was the 46th fastest in the world as of 17 October.

2015
On 14 February, competing in the 3,000 meters at the NYRR Millrose Games Betsy was runner-up to Sally Kipyego

On 1 March, competing in the 10,000 meters at the World Best 10 km in San Juan, Puerto Rico. Betsy finished 3rd in 32:07 only 10 second behind the win.

Competing in the 5,000 meters at the Payton Jordan Invitational on 2 May 2015, she ran a world and Olympic trials qualifying time of 15:00.48 and was runner-up to Sally Kipyego. 2015 World Championships in Athletics & Athletics at the 2016 Summer Olympics Athletics at the 2016 Summer Olympics – Qualification

On July 4, Betsy finished 10th in 15:07.90 in the 5,000 meters Paris Meeting Areva IAAF Diamond League.

Friday 31 July 2015 Betsy punched her ticket to Beijing, China 10,000 meters 2015 World Championships in Athletics at Kenya national trials. Betsy placed 8th in 31:51.35 in China. Betsy's time qualifies her for Athletics at the 2016 Summer Olympics Athletics at the 2016 Summer Olympics – Qualification (if selected).

On September 6, Betsy placed 3rd in road Rabobank Tilburg Ladies Run 10 km in Netherlands in 32:21 where Shalane Flanagan set American record.

=== Nike Bowerman Track Club ===
In October 2015, Betsy joined Nike Bowerman Track Club; leaving American Distance Project in Colorado Springs.

2016

On 20 February 2016 Saina finished first in the Millrose Games women's indoor 5000 meters in 14:57.18, edging out Molly Huddle in the final stretch.

On 27 May 2016 Saina placed 8th in 14:44.67 in Prefontaine Classic.

On August 12, Saina placed 5th in 30:07.78 in the 10,000m at the 2016 Olympic Games.
