= 1989 NCAA Division I cross country championships =

1989 cross-country running meet of the NCAA (Division I)

1989 NCAA Division I Cross Country Championships
- Organisers: NCAA
- Edition: 51st–Men; 9th–Women
- Date: November 20, 1989
- Host city: (Maryland) Annapolis, MD; United States Naval Academy
- Venue: Navy Cross Country Course
- Distances: 10 km–Men; 5 km–Women
- Participation: 181–Men; 183–Women; 364–Total athletes

The 1989 NCAA Division I Cross Country Championships were the 51st annual NCAA Men's Division I Cross Country Championship and the 9th annual NCAA Women's Division I Cross Country Championship to determine the team and individual national champions of NCAA Division I men's and women's collegiate cross country running in the United States. In all, four different titles were contested: men's and women's individual and team championships.

Held on November 20, 1989, the combined meet was hosted by the United States Naval Academy at the Navy Cross Country Course in Annapolis, Maryland. The distance for the men's race was 10 kilometers (6.21 miles) while the distance for the women's race was 5 kilometers (3.11 miles). A record 364 runners, both men and women, contested this championship.

The men's team national championship was won by Iowa State, their first team national title. The individual championship was won by John Nuttall, also from Iowa State, with a time of 29:30.55.

The women's team national championship was won by Villanova, their first national title (and first of their eventual record nine). The individual championship was won by Vicki Huber, also from Villanova, with a time of 15:59.86, the event record time for the 5 kilometer distance (upheld all the way until 2001, when the race distance was extended to 6 kilometers). Huber beat her nearest competitor by almost thirty seconds. This was the first of Villanova's record six consecutive individual women's cross country titles.

== Qualification ==
- All Division I cross country teams were eligible to qualify for the meet through their placement at various regional qualifying meets. In total, 22 teams and 181 runners contested the men's championship while 22 teams and 183 runners contested the women's title. This was the first time the women's race featured more competitors than the men's.

== Men's title ==
- Distance: 10,000 meters (6.21 miles)
- Competitors: 22 teams, 181 runners
- Full Results: MileSplit.com

=== Men's Team Result (Top 10) ===
Rank	Team	Points	Avg. Time
1st place, gold medalist(s)	Iowa State	54	30:06
2nd place, silver medalist(s)	Oregon	72	30:23
3rd place, bronze medalist(s)	Wake Forest	219	31:08
4	Washington	224	31:08
5	Arkansas	235	31:13
6	Georgetown	255	31:14
7	Alabama	261	31:09
8	Nebraska	305	31:21
9	Dartmouth	309	31:30
10	Kansas	314	31:32

=== Men's Individual Result (Top 10) ===
- Runners in italics were not competing with their full team

Rank	Name	Team	Time
1st place, gold medalist(s)	(United Kingdom) John Nuttall	Iowa State	29:30.55
2nd place, silver medalist(s)	(Kenya) Jonah Koech	Iowa State	29:32.69
3rd place, bronze medalist(s)	(Venezuela) German Beltran	Alabama	29:33.51
4	(United States) Terry Thornton	LSU	29:49.75
5	(United States) Bob Kennedy	Indiana	29:54.30
6	(United States) Todd Williams	Tennessee	29:58.47
7	(United States) Shannon Butler	Montana State	29:59.59
8	(United States) Brad Hudson	Oregon	30:01.10
9	(United States) Mark Croghan	Ohio State	30:03.87
10	(United States) Peter Sherry	Georgetown	30:04.96

== Women's title ==
- Distance: 5,000 meters (3.11 miles)
- Competitors: 22 teams, 183 runners
- Full Results: MileSplit.com

=== Women's Team Result (Top 10) ===
Rank	Team	Points	Avg. Time
1st place, gold medalist(s)	Villanova	97	17:09
2nd place, silver medalist(s)	Kentucky	164	17:28
3rd place, bronze medalist(s)	Nebraska	181	17:44
4	Georgetown	189	17:42
5	Oklahoma State	202	17:41
6	Tennessee	223	17:42
7	Clemson	234	17:51
8	Iowa	245	17:52
9	Indiana	264	17:44
10	Providence; UC Irvine	275	17:57; 17:54

=== Women's Individual Result (Top 10) ===
- Runners in italics were not competing with their full team

Rank	Name	Team	Time
1st place, gold medalist(s)	(United States) Vicki Huber	Villanova	15:59.86
2nd place, silver medalist(s)	(Republic of Ireland) Valerie McGovern	Kentucky	16:26.78
3rd place, bronze medalist(s)	(South Africa) Michelle Dekkers	Indiana	16:36.52
4	Susan Bliss	Missouri	16:43.83
5	Patty Wiegand	Tennessee	16:47.62
6	Seana Arnold	Wake Forest	16:48.68
7	Rita Delnoye	UTEP	16:53.02
8	Melinda Rowand	Michigan	16:53.39
9	Jacqueline Goodman	Oklahoma State	16:55.23
10	Jeanne Kruckeberg	Iowa	16:58.99

== See also ==
- NCAA Men's Cross Country Championships (Division II, Division III)
- NCAA Women's Cross Country Championships (Division II, Division III)
