= 1993 NCAA Division I cross country championships =

1993 cross-country running meet of the NCAA (Division I)

1993 NCAA Division I Cross Country Championships
- Organisers: NCAA
- Edition: 55th–Men; 13th–Women
- Date: November 22, 1993
- Host city: (Pennsylvania) Bethlehem, PA
- Venue: Lehigh University
- Distances: 10 km–Men; 5 km–Women
- Participation: 182–Men; 183–Women; 365–Total athletes

The 1993 NCAA Division I Cross Country Championships were the 55th annual NCAA Men's Division I Cross Country Championship and the 13th annual NCAA Women's Division I Cross Country Championship to determine the team and individual national champions of NCAA Division I men's and women's collegiate cross country running in the United States. In all, four different titles were contested: men's and women's individual and team championships.

Held on November 22, 1993, the combined meet was hosted by Lehigh University in Bethlehem, Pennsylvania. The distance for the men's race was 10 kilometers (6.21 miles) while the distance for the women's race was 5 kilometers (3.11 miles).

Both team national championships were again retained by their respective defending champions: Arkansas for the men (their seventh overall and fourth consecutive) and Villanova for the women (their fifth overall and third consecutive). The two individual champions were Josephat Kapkory (Washington State, 39:32.4) and Carole Zajac (Villanova, 16:40.3); it was Zajac's second consecutive title as well.

== Men's title ==
- Distance: 10,000 meters

=== Men's Team Result (Top 10) ===
Rank	Team	Points
1st place, gold medalist(s)	Arkansas	31
2nd place, silver medalist(s)	BYU	153
3rd place, bronze medalist(s)	Iowa State	156
4	Colorado	172
5	Notre Dame	200
6	US Military Academy	210
7	Georgetown	243
8	Washington	2269
9	Wisconsin	292
10	Michigan	296

=== Men's Individual Result (Top 10) ===
Rank	Name	Team	Time
1st place, gold medalist(s)	(Kenya) Joseph Kapkory	Washington State	29:32.4
2nd place, silver medalist(s)	(Canada) Jason Bunton	Arkansas	29:40.2
3rd place, bronze medalist(s)	(Republic of Ireland) Niall Bruton	Arkansas	29:43.6
4	(Canada) Kevin Sullivan	Michigan	29:46.7
5	(Republic of Ireland) Seamus Power	East Tennessee State	28:48.8
6	(Republic of Ireland) Connor Holt	Oklahoma	29:50.2
7	(United States) Ray Appenheimer	Colgate	29:51.3
8	(United States) Teddy Mitchell	Arkansas	29:51.6
9	(Kenya) Solomon Kioni	Oklahoma State	29:51.9
10	(United Kingdom) Simon Baines	Washington	29:52.2

== Women's title ==
- Distance: 5,000 meters

=== Women's Team Result (Top 10) ===
Rank	Team	Points
1st place, gold medalist(s)	Villanova	66
2nd place, silver medalist(s)	Arkansas	71
3rd place, bronze medalist(s)	Georgetown	199
4	Cornell	205
5	Providence	213
6	Michigan	224
7	Penn State	226
8	Oregon	238
9	NC State	240
10	BYU	265

=== Women's Individual Result (Top 10) ===
Rank	Name	Team	Time
1st place, gold medalist(s)	(United States) Carole Zajac	Villanova	16:40.3
2nd place, silver medalist(s)	(United States) Jennifer Rhines	Villanova	16:44.4
3rd place, bronze medalist(s)	(New Zealand) Kay Gooch	Oklahoma	16:47.7
4	(United States) Molly McClimon	Michigan	16:48.4
5	(United States) Amy Rudolph	Providence	16:51.8
6	(United States) Deena Drossin	Arkansas	16:54.0
7	(United States) Becky Spies	Villanova	16:54.6
8	(United States) Megan Flowers	Arkansas	16:56.4
9	(United States) Shelly Taylor	Arkansas	16:58.0
10	(United States) Karen Hecox	UCLA	16:58.3
