= Jennifer Rhines =

American long-distance runner

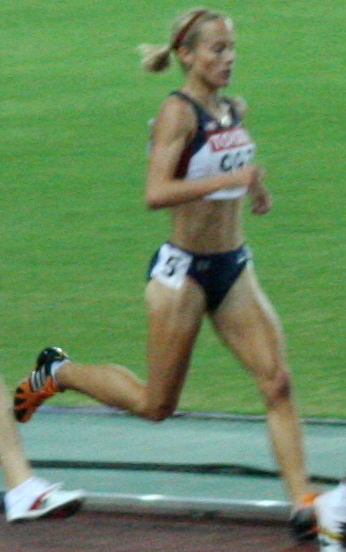
- Rhines at the 2007 World Championships

Personal information
- Born: July 1, 1974 (age 52) Syracuse, New York, U.S.
- Height: 5 ft 3 in (160 cm)
- Website: twitter.com/jlrhines

Sport
- Country: USA
- Events: 5000 m, 10,000 m, cross country, marathon
- College team: Villanova University
- Club: The Mission Athletics Club
- Coached by: Terrence Mahon

Achievements and titles
- Olympic finals: 2008 5000 m, 14th
- World finals: 2007 5000 m, 7th
- Personal bests: 1,500 m: 4:09.52 5000 m: 14:54.29; 10000 m: 31:17.31 half marathon: 1:08:07 marathon: 2:29:32

Jennifer Rhines (born July 1, 1974) is an American long-distance runner who competes in track, cross country and road running events. She has competed in three different Summer Olympics and made 15 US Teams.

Rhines attended Villanova University as an undergraduate. While at Villanova, Rhines was a five-time NCAA individual champion: 5000 meters (1994, 1995, and 1996), 5000i meters (1995), and cross country (1994). She won the Honda Sports Award as the nation's top female cross country runner in 1994–95.

As a post-collegiate professional runner, Rhines has won three USA 15K national titles (1998, 2005, 2011), a USA half-marathon championship (2011), and was the USA 10,000 meter champion on the track in 2002. She competed in the women's 10,000 meters race at the 2000 Sydney Olympics, and finished 16th in her semi-final with a time of 34:08.28. In the 2004 Athens Olympics, she competed in the women's marathon and finished the race in 34th place with a time of 2:43:52.

Rhines qualified for the 2008 Olympic Games by placing second in the 5000 meters at the U.S. Olympic Trials. She finished 14th in the 5000m Beijing final with a time of 16:34.63. Rhines won the 2011 USA Half marathon title, with a time of 1:11:14 in Houston, TX. Jen is coached by her husband Terrence Mahon.

She was the first American to finish at the 2011 Carlsbad 5000, coming third in a time of 15:37 minutes for the 5 km race. On March 28, 2015, Rhines made her 15th USA Team after placing third at the 2015 USA Cross Country Championships. She came in 51st place in the 2015 World Cross Country Championships.

Rhines and Mahon left the Boston Athletic Association in December 2017 to start a coaching group at The Mission Athletics Club in California. As of January 2020, this has been rebranded as the Golden Coast Track Club.

== International competitions ==
Year	Competition	Venue	Position	Notes
Representing the United States
2000	Olympic Games – 10,000m	Sydney, Australia	16th (sf)	34:08.28
2004	Olympic Games – marathon	Athens, Greece	34th	2:43:52
2008	Olympic Games – 5000m	Beijing, China	14th	16:34.63
