= New Mexico Lobos women's cross country =

The women's cross-country team at the University of New Mexico, known as the New Mexico Lobos, won the NCAA championship in 2015 and 2017. Also in 2017, Lobo Ednah Kurgat won the individual title with a record-setting time of 19:19.42. The team placed second nationally in 2018.

In 2021, they won the Mountain West Conference for the 13th year in a row. Also that year, they were earned a top-10 place in the NCAA for the 11th year in a row.

Earlier in their history, the team placed in the top 10 nationally four times.

== 2015 season ==
The team started the preseason at second place in the USTFCCCA poll. It started the regular season at the No. 1 spot in the poll.

Senior Courtney Frerichs was named Mountain West Conference athlete of the week.

The team won the Wisconsin Adidas Invitational. They won their eight-straight conference title. UNM hosted the NCAA Mountain Regional Championships, where the Lobo women placed second.

The team won the national title. According to golobos.com, "The Lobo women, competing in their 10th-ever NCAA Championship, placed all five of their scorers in the top 25 at E.P. 'Tom' Sawyer State Park in Louisville and combined to score 49 points, the lowest team score by any team since 1982." The team had "an 80-point victory over runner-up Colorado." Courtney Frerichs placed fourth overall, with a time of 19 minutes, 48 seconds, over 6 kilometers.

Three Lobo women were chosen to compete at the 2015 SPAR European Cross Country Championships.

=== Roster ===
Name, Year, Hometown / School

- Lindsey Andrews, Sr., Kansas City, Mo. / Columbia College
- Rhona Auckland, Jr., Torphins, Scotland / University of Edinburgh
- Natasha Bernal, Fr., Albuquerque, N.M. / La Cueva HS
- Anna Burton, Sr., Staffordshire, England / University of Bristol
- Sophie Connor, Sr., Hertfordshire, England / University of Warwick
- Mackenzie Everett, Fr., Albuquerque, N.M. / La Cueva HS
- Courtney Frerichs, Sr., Nixa, Mo. / UMKC
- Ruth Haynes, Jr., Surrey, England / Birmingham University
- Emily Hosker-Thornhill, Sr., Canterbury, England / St Mary's University
- Kendall Kelly, R-Fr., Albuquerque, N.M. / Bosque School
- Reiley Kelly, R-Fr., Albuquerque, N.M. / Bosque School
- Jaime Mitsos, Fr., Lockport Township, Ill. / Lockport Township HS
- Molly Renfer, Sr., Esher, England / Harvard University
- Heleene Tambet, Sr., Viljandi, Estonia / Hugo Treffner Gymnasium
- Calli Thackery, Sr., Yorkshire, England / Leeds Metropolitan University
- Whitney Thornburg, Sr., Ashville, N.C. / Harvard University
- Alice Wright, R-So., Worcester, England / The King's School, Worcester

=== Coaching staff ===
- Joe Franklin, Head Coach
- James Butler, Assistant Coach
- Dr. Richard Ceronie, Assistant Coach

Franklin was named NCAA women's coach of the year for the NCAA Mountain Region and the NCAA nationally.

== 2016 season ==
On Oct. 28, 2016, the Lobos won their ninth-straight Mountain West Conference title. Their score was 42 points. The second-place team, Air Force Academy, scored 53. Alice Wright won in 20 minutes, 2.7 seconds over 6 kilometers.

== Sources ==
- The University of New Mexico Lobos
