= BYU Cougars =

Intercollegiate sports teams of Brigham Young University

Coordinates: 40.2470°N 111.6550°W

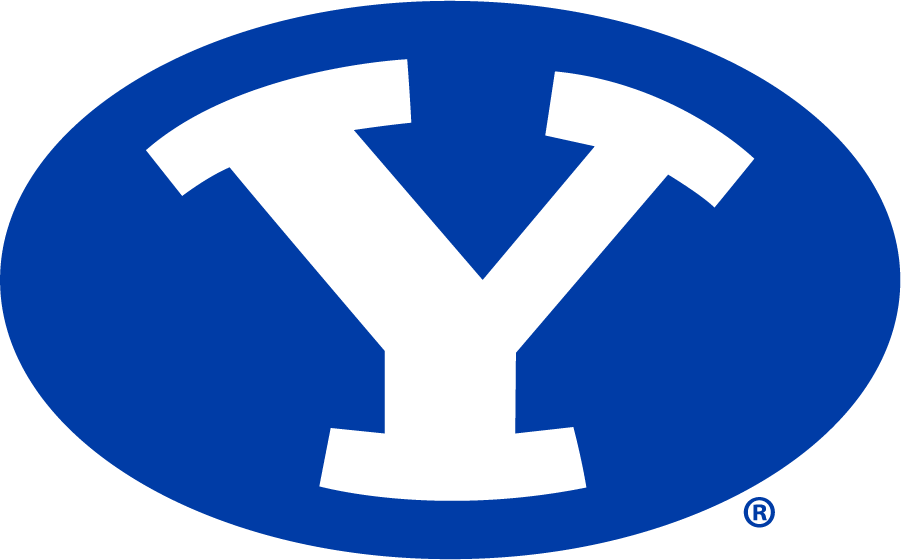
- University: Brigham Young University
- Nickname: Cougars
- NCAA: Division I (FBS)
- Conference: Big 12; MPSF (men's volleyball)
- Athletic director: Brian Santiago
- Location: Provo, Utah
- Varsity teams: 21 (10 men's and 11 women's)
- Football stadium: LaVell Edwards Stadium
- Basketball arena: Marriott Center
- Baseball stadium: Larry H. Miller Field
- Softball stadium: Gail Miller Field
- Soccer stadium: South Field
- Other venues: Smith Fieldhouse; Clarence F. Robison Track; Stephen L. Richards Pool
- Colors: Blue and white
- Mascot: Cosmo the Cougar
- Fight song: "The Cougar Song"
- Website: byucougars.com

Team NCAA championships
- 13

Individual and relay NCAA champions
- 86

The BYU Cougars are the intercollegiate athletic teams that represent Brigham Young University (BYU), located in Provo, Utah. BYU fields 21 National Collegiate Athletic Association (NCAA) varsity athletic teams. They are a member of the Big 12 Conference for all sports except men's volleyball which is a member of the Mountain Pacific Sports Federation.

== History ==
All teams are named the "Cougars"; the name was first introduced by Eugene L. Roberts in the 1920s, and initially only applied to the football team. In 1924, live cougar kittens named Cleo and Tarbo were brought to BYU and used as its mascots. In 1930, Tarbo died and Cleo was sent to the Hogle Zoo in Salt Lake City. By the 1950s all sports teams were known as the Cougars and it was decided that having a person in a costume was a better mascot form than live animals. The athletics mascot, Cosmo the Cougar, was created by Dwayne Stevenson, and made his first appearance before BYU fans on October 15, 1953. The school's fight song is the "Cougar Fight Song".

BYU is owned and operated by the Church of Jesus Christ of Latter-day Saints, and the overwhelming majority of its students are members of that church. Because many of its players serve full-time missions for two years, BYU's athletes are often older on average than other schools' players. The NCAA allows students to serve missions for two years without subtracting that time from their eligibility period. This has caused minor controversy. However, it is largely recognized as not lending the school any significant advantage, as players receive no athletic and little physical training during their missions. BYU has also received attention from sports networks for refusal to play games on Sunday, as well as disciplining players due to honor code violations.

BYU was a member of the West Coast Conference from 2011 to 2022, except for football, which played as an independent. From 1999 to 2011 they were a member of the Mountain West Conference and before the formation of the MW, the Cougars competed in the Rocky Mountain Athletic Conference, the Mountain States Conference, and the Western Athletic Conference. BYU officially joined the Big 12 Conference on July 1, 2023.

== Sports sponsored ==
Big 12 logo in BYU's colors

| Men's sports | Women's sports |
|---|---|
| Baseball | Basketball |
| Basketball | Cross country |
| Cross country | Golf |
| Football | Gymnastics |
| Golf | Soccer |
| Swimming and diving | Softball |
| Tennis | Swimming and diving |
| Track and field^{†} | Tennis |
| Volleyball | Track and field^{†} |
| | Volleyball |
^{†} – Track and field includes both indoor and outdoor

=== Football ===
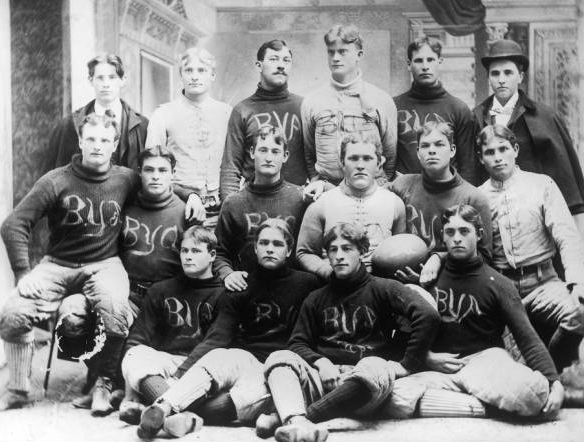
The school's first football team won the regional championship in 1896.

The Brigham Young University Cougars football program competes at the NCAA Division I FBS (formerly I-A) level. Coached by Kalani Sitake, the team plays at LaVell Edwards Stadium. In 1984, the undefeated Cougars were voted the consensus national champion BYU is known as a "quarterback factory" for producing several successful quarterbacks, including 1990 Heisman Trophy winner Ty Detmer. Alumni who have played in the NFL include Jim McMahon, Steve Young, Gifford Nielsen, Bart Oates, Chad Lewis, Vai Sikahema, Todd Christensen, John Beck, and Zach Wilson.

=== Men's basketball ===
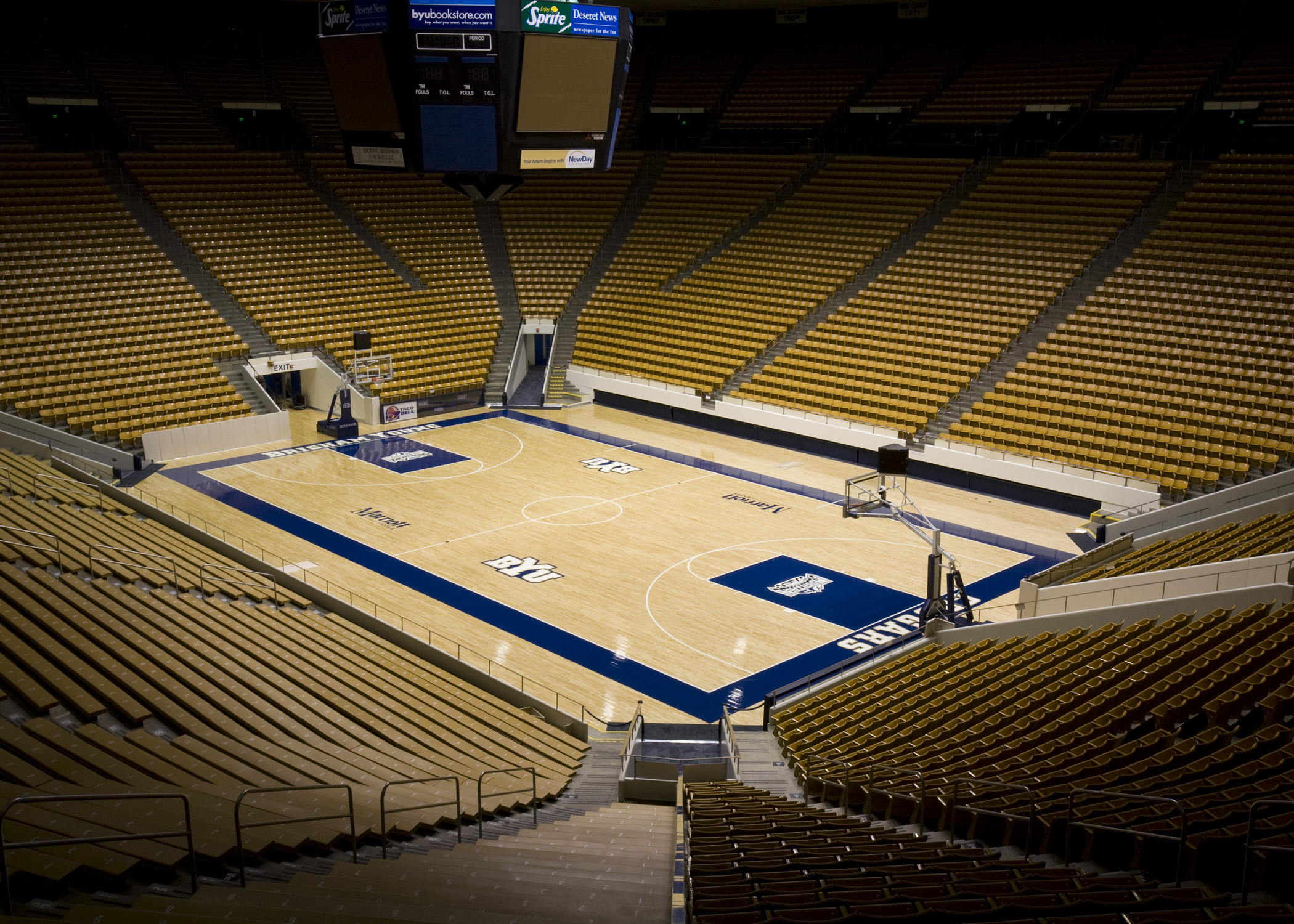
The Marriott Center, home to the Cougars' men's and women's basketball teams

The BYU men's basketball team is ranked among top 25 NCAA programs for all-time total victories. As of 2006, BYU had 82 winning seasons, 26 conference titles, 21 NCAA tournament invites, 10 NIT invites, and two NIT titles (1951 and 1966). In 2005, the program was ranked 36th in Street & Smiths "100 greatest College Basketball Programs of All Time", based on NCAA tournament success, NIT success, national championships, conference regular-season and tournament titles, all-time win–loss percentage, graduation percentage, NCAA infractions, NBA first round draft picks, and mascot ferocity. In the 2006–07 season, the Cougars became nationally ranked for the first time since 1994 and won the Mountain West Conference regular season championship outright. The team's current head coach is Kevin Young, who was hired in 2024.

=== Women's basketball ===
The BYU women's basketball team represents the university in the Big 12 Conference and after the retirement of 21 year coach Jeff Judkins is now coached by Amber Whiting. The Cougars play their home games in the Marriott Center in Provo, Utah. The team has made eight NCAA Tournament appearances in the last 30 years and has frequently been at the top of its conference.

=== Men's cross country ===
Cross country originated at BYU as an informal competition, technically classified as a long distance running event for the track and field team. Clarence Robison, an experienced collegiate and Olympic long distance runner, became the track and field coach in 1950. Robison's experience and interest in long distance running led to the growing popularity of cross country both in track and field and as its own sport. Competitions in cross country were often held jointly with the track and field team. In 1962, Sherald James was added on the track and field coaching staff with his primary responsibility being the cross country team. James helped cultivate the popularity of the program and cross country as an event in track and field.

Three BYU runners have won 4 individual cross country national championships; Ed Eyestone in 1985, Josh Rohatinsky in 2006, and Conner Mantz in 2020 and 2021. Eyestone has been the head men's cross country coach since 2000, replacing James.

In 2018, BYU finished second nationally. In 2019, BYU won its first national championship.

=== Women's cross country ===
In 1973, BYU joined other universities to form the Intermountain Athletic Conference which allowed BYU's female athletes to compete in sports including cross country. In 1982, BYU joined the High Country Athletic Conference. The women's cross country team won championships in 1982 and 1983. The BYU women's cross-country team has won national championships in 1997, 1999, 2001, and 2002, led by coach Patrick Shane. Due to his success leading the team to four victories, Shane was named NCAA coach of the year.

Under the coaching of Diljeet Taylor, the BYU women's cross-country team has won 2 more national championships, coming in 2021 and 2024. In 2019, the BYU women's team finished in second place at the NCAA national championship. The Cougars' top three runners all had top 10 finishes as Courtney Wayment, Erika Birk, and Whittni Orton finished 5th, 6th, and 7th respectively.

=== Men's golf ===
BYU became involved in college golf slowly. Coach Fred Dixon led the golf team to a 1956 conference victory, but for most of the 1950s, golfers finished in third and fourth place. After Dave Crowton (previous assistant football coach and head baseball coach at BYU) became the coach of the golf team, the team placed fifth in 1960 and second in 1961. The golf program began to grow in 1962 under the direction of Karl Tucker. The teams placed fourth in 1963 and second in 1965. The golf team won their first Western Athletic Conference championship in 1966. The golf team won all seven tournaments against several other universities on its 1975 tour to Scotland, France, and England. The BYU men's golf team won the 1981 NCAA Championship. They have won 25 conference championships: 21 Western Athletic Conference (1966, 1968, 1970, 1972–77, 1980–84, 1986–87, 1990–92, 1995, 1999), two Mountain West Conference (2001, 2007) and three West Coast Conference (2014, 2017, 2023).

=== Women's golf ===
The BYU women's golf team has had three Conference Coach of the Year winners, two Conference Freshmen of the year, and eight Individual Conference Champions. In 1983, Kelli Antolock won the USGA Women's Amateur Public Links Golf Championship. The women's golf team has won three West Coast Conference Championships in 2016, 2017, and 2018.

The team is currently coached by Carrie Roberts, who has been the head coach since 2010. Carrie also played golf for BYU as a student between 1998 and 2002.

=== Gymnastics ===
Prior to 1958, gymnastics existed at BYU as an unsponsored sport, winning league victories as early as 1911. The BYU gymnastics program was officially established in 1958 by the BYU Athletics Department with Richard Andrus as the first head coach. During the beginnings of the program, scheduling was a significant problem. The closest university with a program was 600 miles away. Colleges who did have programs either had few open dates, or requested large amounts of money for travel expenses. Consequently, BYU traveled to Colorado and California only, and did not have home meets. During their first year, the team finished with three wins and two losses.

In 1959, Rudy Moe was named the next head coach. He coached the gymnastics team for six years. The Western Athletic Conference (WAC) was established halfway through his tenure as head coach. Moe trained several nationally ranked gymnasts and his teams finished second and third place (twice) in the conference during his last three years. Bruce Morgenegg was named the head coach in 1965 and the team placed second in the conference, only four points behind the University of Arizona. The team's best performing gymnast was Richard Nickolas who was to that point, the only BYU gymnast to win the WAC all-around title. Nickolas was also BYU's first gymnast to finish in the top ten in the NCAA all-around event. Following 1965, the team performed poorly; nevertheless, Dennis Ramsey tied for second place in the 1967-68 NCAA finals. BYU finished third in the conference the next two years. Ramsey finished second place again in the NCAA finals.

Dr. Lavon Johnson took over the head coaching responsibilities while Morgenegg took a leave of absence to pursue doctoral studies. Johnson had experience head coaching the gymnastics team at the University of Utah. He directed the team to a second-place finish in the WAC. The team won the championship at the Portland Open and sixth place in the Rocky Mountain Open, with a third-place finish in the conference. When Morgenegg resuming coaching between 1972 and 1975, the team's record was mediocre; however Wayne Young performed well individually. Despite the fact that many colleges and universities were cancelling their gymnastics programs, BYU's program continued to grow. The Physical Education department increased their budget for the gymnastics team. Consequently, BYU hired Greg Sano to replace Morgenegg. Sano was not a member of the LDS Church, but had tremendous international experience coaching.

BYU phased out their men's gymnastic program in 1999. As of 2019, there is only a female gymnastics team at BYU. The BYU gymnastics team has won five conference championships, two in the West Coast Conference and threw in the Mountain West Conference. In 2015, Guard Young (son of Wayne Young) and former All-American on the BYU gymnastics team, was named the head coach of the BYU gymnastics team. Before joining the Big 12 Conference in 2023, the gymnastics program was a member of the Mountain Rim Gymnastics Conference from 2013-2023.

=== Baseball ===
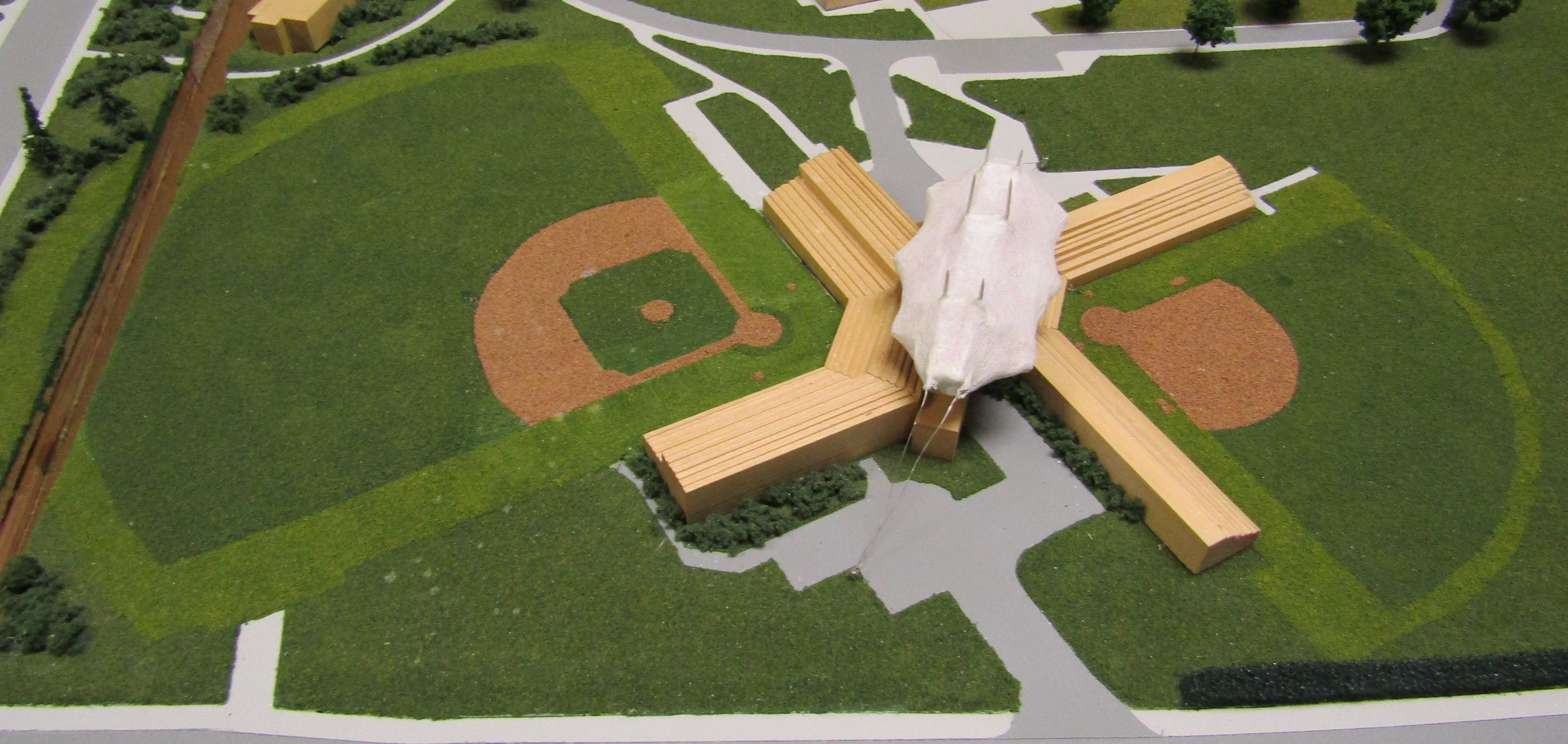
Miller Field scale model

The BYU baseball team played its first game in 1895 and currently plays in the Larry H. Miller Field.

=== Softball ===
The BYU softball team rejoined the bulk of the school's teams in the WCC in July 2013, when the conference began sponsoring softball once Pacific rejoined after an absence of more than 40 years. BYU softball had returned to the Western Athletic Conference as part of the school's 2011 conference change, but played only one season in the WAC, moving to the Pacific Coast Softball Conference after the 2012 season and playing there for what proved to be the PCSC's final season in 2013.

=== Women's soccer ===
Since joining the NCAA in 1995, the women's soccer team has appeared in the NCAA tournament 24 times, reaching as far as the Elite Eight in 2003, 2012, 2019, 2021, and 2023.

=== Swimming ===
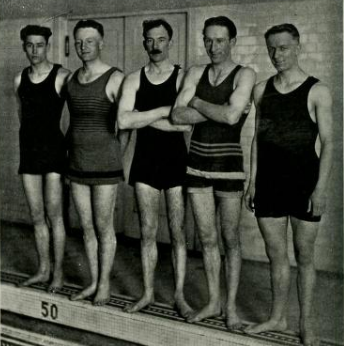
The first BYU swim team, 1922

Even though BYU did not have its own swimming pool in the 1920s, the university swimming team was successful. A member of the team in 1928 and 1928 Bud Shields held the American record for the 220-yard and 440-year freestyle. Shields was recognized as the high point man at two national swimming meets in 1928 and 1929. The swimming program was cancelled in 1930 after the Provo High School swimming pool was boarded up, because it was the only available swimming pool in the area. Walter Cryer became the head coach and revived the swimming team in 1964. Until the Richards Building was completed in 1965, Cryer coached four swimmers at Park Ro She Swimming Pool in Springville. The Richards Building contained two swimming pools and one diving pool. The team was successful during its first six years of reinstatement. Fifteen women tried out for the women's swimming team in 1923, as intercollegiate sports were not yet popular at BYU among women.

As of 2011 BYU has about 550 athletes on 21 teams including football and men's basketball. BYU has Men and Women's Swimming and Diving Teams which have produced 26 Olympians and 31 All-Americans. In the 2009–10 NCAA NCAA final ranking: Women (1) Men (3).

=== Track and field ===
The track and field team at BYU began in 1899. The first annual BYU Invitational Track Meet was in 1911. The team won its first conference championship in 1929. The track teams were successful in the 1930s; they won conference championships in 1935 and 1936. Clarence Robinson began coaching the BYU track team in 1950. Robinson had been a former BYU track athlete and participated in the 1948 U.S. Olympics. After working with his inexperience track team, Robinson built the team to win eight straight conference championships since 1955. The teams finished second in the conference after the creation of the Western Athletic Conference (WAC). The team finished in the top ten in the nation from 1964 to 1967. The team finished second in the nation in 1966. BYU hosted the NCAA championships the following year. The BYU team won its first WAC championship in 1968, and again in 1969. They won second place in 1970, but rose again to first place in 1971. The 1970 Men's track and field team tied with Oregon and Kansas to win the outdoor national championship. In 1970, Ralph Mann set a world record in the 440 high hurdle in Des Moines with a time of 48.8 seconds, winning him a second NCAA title. Paul Cummings was the first BYU athlete to achieve a sub-four-minute mile, earning him an NCAA championship in 1974.

The BYU track team has had several national champions and Olympians. In 1966, Bob Richards won the steeplechase in 8:51.6. Joshua McAdams won the event 40 years later, as did Kyle Perry in 2010. In 1984 Ed Eyestone went undefeated in NCAA cross-country events. He is one of only four runners to ever capture the NCAA "Triple Crown" by becoming the 1985 NCAA outdoor Champion at 5,000 meters and 10,000 meters where he set a then-NCAA record with a time of 27:41:05.

Miles Batty won the indoor national championship in the mile in 2011, then anchored the BYU distance medley relay team for another gold medal. In 2012, at the Millrose Games, he set a new collegiate record for the indoor mile at 3:54.54.

In March 2011, BYU's Leif Arrhenius won the shot put competition in the NCAA track and field national championships and men's distance medley relay team also won the national title in their event.

=== Men's volleyball ===
BYU's men's volleyball has won three NCAA national championships in (1999, 2001, and 2004) and has been the Mountain Pacific Sports Federation champion ten times (1999, 2001, 2003, 2004, 2013, 2014, 2016, 2017, 2018 and 2021).

=== Women's volleyball ===
The women's volleyball team is also consistently nationally ranked, reaching the National Championship game of the 2014 NCAA tournament.

== NCAA Division I: NACDA Learfield Director's Cup ==
See footnote and NACDA Directors' Cup

BYU Directors' Cup Standings

| Seasons | National Rank | Conference Rank |
|---|---|---|
| 1993–94 | 22nd | 1st |
| 1994–95 | 28th | 1st |
| 1995–96 | 33rd | 1st |
| 1996–97 | 16th | 1st |
| 1997–98 | 18th | 1st |
| 1998–99 | 12th | 1st |
| 1999–00 | 18th | 1st |
| 2000–01 | 17th | 1st |
| 2001–02 | 23rd | 1st |
| 2002–03 | 45th | 1st |

| Seasons | National Rank | Conference Rank |
|---|---|---|
| 2003–04 | 29th | 1st |
| 2004–05 | 27th | 1st |
| 2005–06 | 31st | 1st |
| 2006–07 | 26th | 1st |
| 2007–08 | 41st | 1st |
| 2008–09 | 47th | 2nd |
| 2009–10 | 36th | 1st |
| 2010–11 | 37th | 1st |
| 2011–12 | 43rd | 1st |
| 2012–13 | 43rd | 1st |

| Seasons | National Rank | Conference Rank |
|---|---|---|
| 2013–14 | 42nd | 1st |
| 2014–15 | 48th | 1st |
| 2015–16 | 30th | 1st |
| 2016–17 | 31st | 1st |
| 2017–18 | 45th | 1st |
| 2018–19 | 29th | 1st |
| 2019–20 | No standings | No standings |
| 2020–21 | 17th | 1st |
| 2021–22 | 29th | 1st |
| 2022–23 | 37th | 1st |
| 2023–24 | 36th | 5th |
| 2024–25 | 25th | 1st |

== Extramural and recognized sports ==
=== Men's Lacrosse ===
The BYU Cougars Men's Lacrosse team currently competes in the Men's Collegiate Lacrosse Association (MCLA) as a member of the Rocky Mountain Lacrosse Conference (RMLC). The BYU Lacrosse team was founded in 1968; however, significant records of the team only date back to 1995 when Jason Lamb began his tenure as head coach. The BYU Lacrosse team had four wins and five losses (4–5) in their first season under Coach Lamb, accounting for their only losing season on record. The Cougars went 13–3 in his second season and have not had a losing season since. The team's worst record since 1995 came in 2006 when they went 12–8, although during the 2006 national tournament they advanced to the Final Four. The summer of 2009 brought a coaching change to the lacrosse team when long-time assistant, Matt Schneck took over the reins as the head coach. In his second season as head coach, Schneck led the Cougars to their fourth national championship. With the 2011 Championship, Schneck became the first person in MCLA History to win a national championship as both player and head coach. The Cougars won their sixth National Championship in 2024.

The Cougars won the MCLA national championship in 1997, 2000, 2007, 2011, 2021 and 2024. The Cougars have won the RMLC championship fourteen times, capturing the title in 1997, 1998, 1999, 2001, 2005, 2007, 2008, 2009, 2015, 2016, 2017, 2021, 2022 and 2024. Head Coach Matt Schneck and the Cougars completed the 2024 season 19-0, capturing both the RMCL and MCLA Championship and completing the programs first perfect season.

=== Women's lacrosse ===
On October 8, 2015, Brigham Young University added two new women's teams to its extramural sports programs, women's rugby and women's lacrosse.

The women's lacrosse team competes in the Women's Collegiate Lacrosse Associates.

=== Racquetball ===
BYU's men's racquetball team placed third at the 2008 USA Racquetball National Intercollegiate Championships. The BYU women's racquetball team has won nine national championships in: 1995, 1996, 1997, 1998, 1999, 2000, 2002, 2003 and 2008.

=== Men's rugby ===
Founded in 1965, the BYU men's rugby team plays in the Rocky Mountain Conference of Division 1-A Rugby. BYU has been led by head coach Steve St. Pierre since 2018, and normally plays its home games at South Field. Several BYU players have gone on to play for the U.S. national team.

BYU has been a major force in American college rugby. BYU reached the USA Rugby national championship match in 7 consecutive years from 2006 to 2012. BYU rugby won its first national championship in 2009 by defeating the University of California, Berkeley, and again won the national championship in 2012. The following season, several of the top college rugby teams withdrew from the USA Rugby D1A competition and organized their own championship called the Varsity Cup, which many view as equivalent to a national championship. In 2013, BYU had an undefeated season, won the Varsity Cup by beating Cal in the final, and finished the season ranked the #1 team in college rugby. BYU Rugby made it to the quarter-finals in the 2019 season, losing to Saint Mary's.

=== Women's rugby ===
As of October 8, 2015, Brigham Young University is adding two new women's teams to its extramural sports programs, which currently includes five teams. The two new sports are women's rugby and women's lacrosse.

The current program includes men's lacrosse, men's rugby, men's soccer and men's and women's racquetball. The extramural program falls under the direction of Student Life at BYU. Teams in this program compete outside the university.

=== Men's soccer ===
The BYU Cougars men's soccer team is a college soccer club. The team plays its home games at The Stadium at South Field on the campus of Brigham Young University, where they have played since 2003. The men's soccer club has won ten NIRSA National Championships in 1996, 1997, 1998, 1999, 2001, 2017, 2019, 2021, 2022, 2023.

== Former programs ==
=== Men's Gymnastics & Wrestling ===
BYU ended its wrestling and men's gymnastics programs at the end of the 1998–1999 season. This decision was officially made largely due to a lack of other teams in the region to compete with, when in actuality, it was mostly Title IX reasons. For wrestling, this reason was highly debated at the time as there were plenty of teams to compete with in the region, and a state rival was even added with Utah Valley University, albeit 4 years later. The men's gymnastics team had made four NCAA tournament appearances in 1992, 1998, 1999, and 2000 while placing 5th in 1998–99. The wrestling team had made 32 NCAA tournament appearances and finished 4th in 1973.

=== Men’s Ice Hockey ===
BYU students had played organized ice hockey since the 1970s, but in the mid-1990s the club entered collegiate play as the Provo IceCats. In 2007 the team was granted official extramural sport status by the university and competed as BYU in the Mountain West Collegiate Hockey League. In late 2021, the university informed the team it would no longer officially sanction the club, citing Title IX and organizational concerns. With the American Collegiate Hockey Association requiring official recognition of a university to compete, the team ceased operations at the end of the 2021-22 season.

== Budget ==
Similar to other Division I programs, football and men's basketball provide the majority of BYU's athletics revenue and profits. Revenue comes from ticket sales, corporate sponsors, broadcasting contracts, and contributions. In 2009 BYU athletics had revenue of $41 million and expenses of $35 million, resulting in a profit of $5.5 million or about 16%. That year football provided more than 60% of revenue, used 42% of total expenses, and had a profit margin of 53%. Men's basketball provided about 15% of revenue and had an 8% profit margin. Women's basketball provided less than 3% of revenue and was unprofitable, as were all other sports.

== National championships ==
As of November 23, 2024 BYU has won 13 NCAA team national championships.

=== Team NCAA championships ===
- Men's (7)
  - Cross country (2): 2019, 2024
  - Golf (1): 1980
  - Outdoor track and field (1): 1970
  - Volleyball (3): 1999, 2001, 2004
- Women's (6)
  - Cross country (6): 1997, 1999, 2001, 2002, 2020, 2024
- See also
  - List of NCAA schools with the most NCAA Division I championships

As of January 10, 2024, BYU has won 86 NCAA individual national championships.

=== Individual NCAA championships ===
- Men's (57)
  - Cross country (4)
  - Gymnastics (5)
  - Indoor track and field (12)
  - Outdoor track and field (32)
  - Swimming and diving (4)
- Women's (29)
  - Cross country (1)
  - Indoor track and field (9)
  - Outdoor track and field (16)
  - Swimming and diving (3)

=== Team Non-NCAA championships ===
Below are the 28 national team titles that were not bestowed by the NCAA. Men's football, men's rugby and women's racquetball titles were won at the highest level of collegiate competition.

- Men's (21)
  - Football (1): 1984 (The team was named national champion by NCAA-designated major selectors of AP, Billingsley, Football Research, FW, National Football Foundation, Poling, and UPI)
  - Lacrosse (MCLA) (6): 1997, 2000, 2007, 2011, 2021, 2024
  - Rugby (D1-A) (2): 2009, 2012
  - Rugby (Varsity Cup) (2): 2013, 2014
  - Soccer (NIRSA) (11): 1996, 1997, 1998, 1999, 2001, 2017, 2019, 2021, 2022, 2023, 2024
- Women's (10)
  - Racquetball (US Racquetball Association) (9): 1995, 1996, 1997, 1998, 1999, 2000, 2002, 2003, 2008
  - Rugby (D1) (1): 2019 (spring half)

== Athletic facilities ==
=== Current facilities ===
- Clarence F. Robison Track — Men's and women's outdoor track
- Gail Miller Field — Softball
- Larry H. Miller Field — Baseball
- LaVell Edwards Stadium — Football
- Marriott Center — Men's and women's basketball
- Smith Fieldhouse — Men's and women's volleyball, Gymnastics, Men's and women's indoor track
- South Field — Women's soccer
- Stephen L. Richards Pool — Men's and women's swimming and diving

== People ==
=== Athletic directors ===
- G. Ott Romney (1928–1936)
- Eddie Kimball (1937–1963)
- Floyd Millet (1963–1970)
- Stan Watts (1970–1976)
- Lu Wallace (women's, 1972–1995)
- Glen Tuckett (1976–1993)
- Clayne Jensen (1993–1995)
- Rondo Fehlberg (1995–1999)
- Elaine Michaelis (women's, 1995–2004)
- Val Hale (1999–2004)
- Tom Holmoe (2005–2025)
- Brian Santiago (2025- )

== See also ==
- Beehive Boot
- Haka performed by non-New Zealand sports teams § Brigham Young University
- Holy War, the football version of the above rivalry
- Old Oquirrh Bucket
- BYU–Utah rivalry
- Cultural significance of the cougar in North America
