= BYU Cougars football =

College football program representing Brigham Young University

2026 BYU Cougars football team
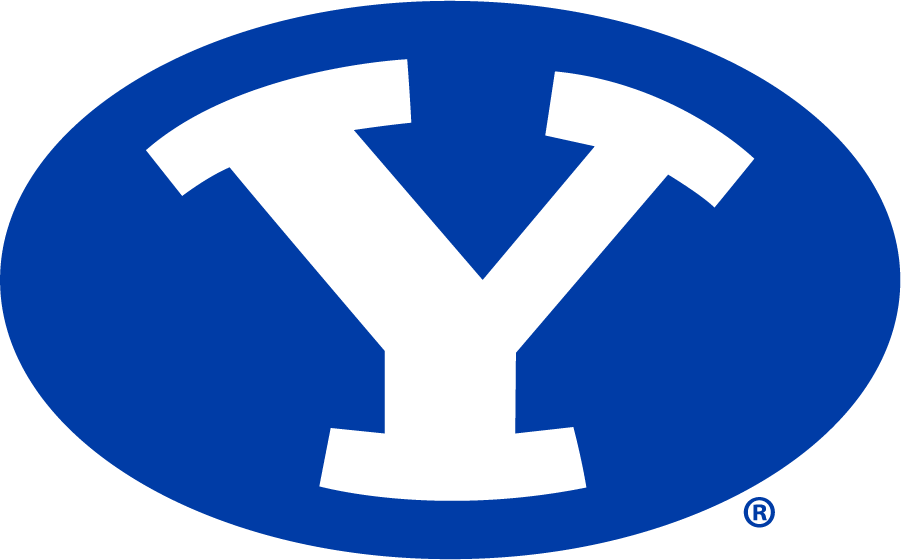
- First season: 1922; 104 years ago
- Athletic director: Brian Santiago
- Head coach: Kalani Sitake; 11th season, 92–47 (.662)
- Location: Provo, Utah
- Stadium: LaVell Edwards Stadium (capacity: 62,073)
- NCAA division: Division I FBS
- Conference: Big 12
- Colors: Blue and white
- All-time record: 633–448–27 (.583)
- Bowl record: 19–22–1 (.464)

National championships
- Claimed: 1984

Conference championships
- WAC: 1965, 1974, 1976, 1977, 1978, 1979, 1980, 1981, 1982, 1983, 1984, 1985, 1989, 1990, 1991, 1992, 1993, 1995, 1996 MWC: 1999, 2001, 2006, 2007

Division championships
- WAC Mountain: 1996 WAC Pacific: 1998
- Heisman winners: Ty Detmer – 1990
- Consensus All-Americans: 14 (6 unanimous)
- Rivalries: Utah (Holy War); Utah State (The Old Wagon Wheel)

Uniforms
- Fight song: The Cougar Song
- Mascot: Cosmo the Cougar
- Marching band: The Power of the Wasatch
- Outfitter: Nike
- Website: BYUCougars.com

The BYU Cougars football team is the college football program representing Brigham Young University (BYU) in Provo, Utah. The Cougars began collegiate football competition in 1922, and have won 23 conference championships and one national championship in 1984.

The team has competed in several different athletic conferences during its history, from July 1, 2011, to June 30, 2022, they competed as an FBS Independent. On September 10, 2021, the Big 12 Conference unanimously accepted BYU's application to the conference. BYU officially joined the Big 12 on July 1, 2023.

The team plays home games at the 62,073 seat LaVell Edwards Stadium, named after head coach LaVell Edwards who won 19 conference championships, seven bowl games, and one national championship (1984) while coaching at BYU.

== History ==
=== Early history ===
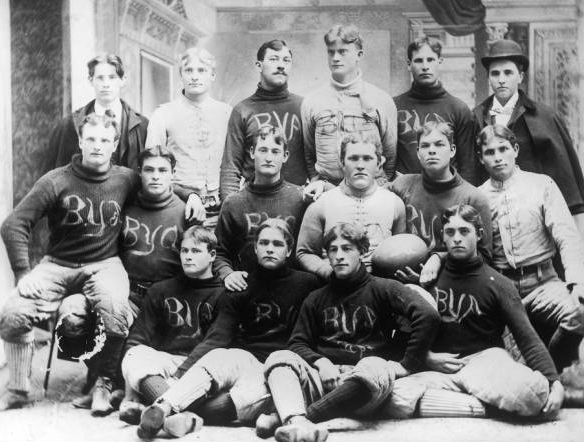
The school's first football team won the regional championship in 1896.

BYU traces its football roots back to the late 19th century. Benjamin Cluff became the third principal of Brigham Young Academy (the precursor to BYU) in 1892 (the school was converted into a university in 1903) and was influenced by his collegiate studies at the University of Michigan to bring athletic competition to Brigham Young. The first BYU football team in 1896 played the University of Utah (winning 12–4), the Elks, the Crescents, the YMCA of Salt Lake City, the Wheel Club of Denver, and Westminster College; and it ultimately won the championship. In its second year of competition, the BYA football team won the championship too, but as a result of an accidental football-related death in Utah in 1900, football was banned from all LDS Church schools until 1919.

After a 20-year ban on football, the sport was brought back to BYU on an intramural basis in 1919, and intercollegiate games were resumed in 1920 under coach Alvin Twitchell. BYU was admitted to the Rocky Mountain Conference in 1921 and had its first winning year in 1929 under the helm of coach G. Ott Romney, who BYU recruited from Montana State University the year before. Romney and his successor Eddie Kimball ushered in a new era in Cougar football in which the team went 65–51–12 between 1928 and 1942. In 1932, the Cougars posted an 8–1 record and outscored their opponents 188–50, which remains one of the school's finest seasons on record. The university did not field a team from 1943 to 1945 due to World War II, and in 1949 suffered its only winless season, going 0–11.

The team began to rebuild in the mid-1950s, recruiting University of Rhode Island head coach Hal Kopp to lead the Cougars, who achieved back-to-back winning seasons in 1957 and 1958, led by southpaw quarterback Jared Stephens and nose tackle Gavin Anae. In 1961, Eldon "The Phantom" Fortie became the school's first All-American, and in 1962, BYU became a founding member of the Western Athletic Conference (now known as the United Athletic Conference). In 1964, Cougar Stadium was built, which included a capacity of 30,000, and in 1965, head coach Tommy Hudspeth led the Cougars to their first conference championship with a record of 6–4.

=== LaVell Edwards era (1972–2000) ===
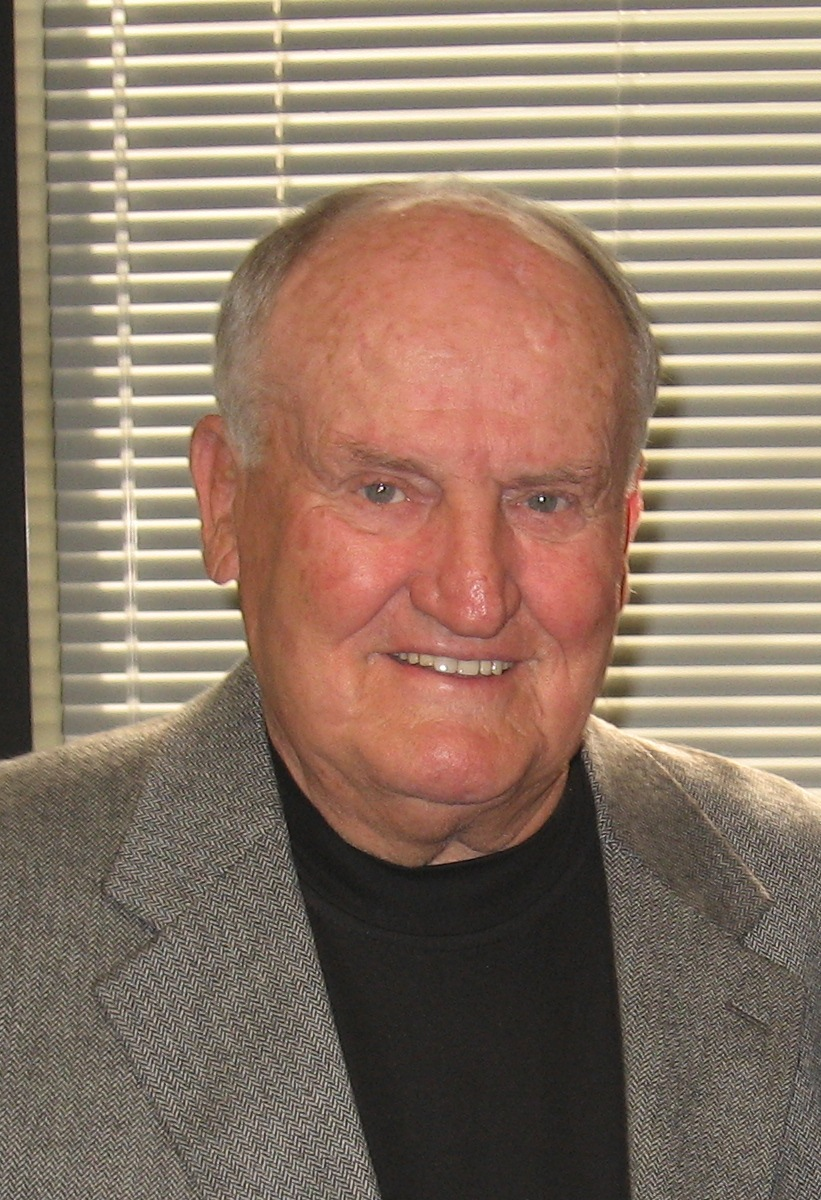
Coach LaVell Edwards

In 1972, assistant coach LaVell Edwards was promoted to head coach, succeeding Hudspeth. Edwards and his staff installed a drop-back passing game considered to be an early implementation of the West Coast offense, resulting in Cougar Pete Van Valkenburg as the nation's leading rusher for that year. The following year, the Cougars struggled to a 5–6 finish, but this would be Edwards' only losing season during his run as BYU coach over the next three decades. In fact, the Cougars won the conference championship every year except one from 1974 to 1985, including the national championship in 1984. However, the Cougars lost their first four bowl games. Their first post-season win came in the 1980 Holiday Bowl, which has become known as the "Miracle Bowl" since BYU was trailing SMU 45–25 with four minutes left in the game and then came back to win. BYU would win its 1981, 1983, and 1984 bowl games as well; and it earned the nickname "Quarterback U" for consistently producing All-American quarterbacks, which included Gifford Nielsen, Marc Wilson, Jim McMahon and Steve Young. During this period, Young finished second for the Heisman Trophy in 1983 and McMahon finished third for the trophy in 1981.

In 1984, BYU reached the pinnacle of college football when it was recognized as college football national champions, being the only unbeaten, untied team in the nation. The undefeated Cougars (12–0–0) opened the season with a 20–14 victory over Pitt (3–7–1), ranked No. 3 in the nation at the time and finished the season with a victory over the Michigan Wolverines (6–5–0). The victory over Michigan, 24–17 in the Holiday Bowl, marked the only time a national champion played in a bowl game before New Year's Day, and the second-to-last time a national championship was determined by a team from a non-power 5 conference. Coupled with the 11 consecutive wins to close out the 1983 season, BYU concluded the 1984 championship on a 24-game winning streak. At the end of the season, BYU was voted National Champion after being number one in all four NCAA sanctioned polls AP, Coaches, NFF, and FWAA.

In 1985, quarterback Robbie Bosco finished third in the Heisman balloting; in 1986, defensive lineman Jason Buck became the first BYU player ever to win the Outland Trophy; and in 1989, offensive lineman Mo Elewonibi also won the Outland Trophy. In 1990, the Cougars achieved their first victory over a top-ranked team when they defeated the No. 1 Miami Hurricanes early in the season, and the season culminated with quarterback Ty Detmer becoming BYU's first and only Heisman Trophy winner. In 1996, BYU won the first ever WAC Championship Game in Las Vegas and earned a bid to play in the Cotton Bowl against Kansas State of the newly formed Big 12 Conference, making it BYU's first ever New Year's Day bowl game, which they won 19–15. BYU finished ranked No. 5 in both the Coaches and AP polls, and became the first team in NCAA history to win 14 games in a season.

=== Mountain West era (1999–2010) ===
In 1999, BYU left the WAC along with seven other teams to form the Mountain West Conference, with the Cougars winning a share of the inaugural MWC championship. With the change of conferences, BYU also debuted a new color scheme, featuring a darker shade of blue, a redesigned cougar logo, and the introduction of tan as an accent color. 1999 also featured the controversial "bib" home uniforms, which only lasted for one season.

Just prior to the 2000 season, Edwards announced that it would be his final year as the program's head coach, and prior to Edwards' final home game, The Church of Jesus Christ of Latter-day Saints President Gordon B. Hinckley announced that Cougar Stadium would be renamed "LaVell Edwards Stadium". After punter Aaron Edwards threw a last second touchdown pass on a fake punt, Coach Edwards was carried off the field following the season closer against the Utes.

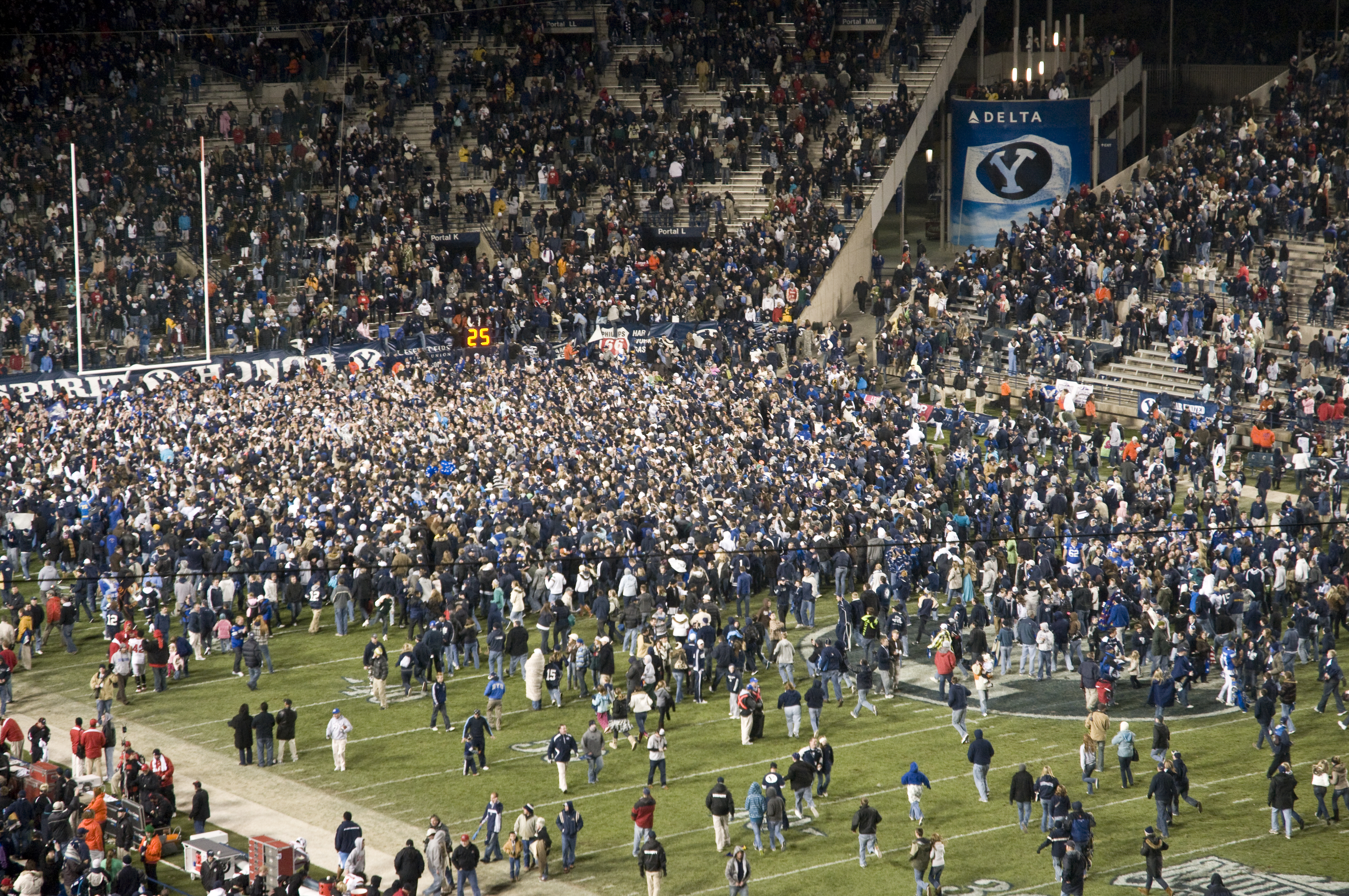
Fans storming the field at LaVell Edwards Stadium in 2009 after No. 19 BYU beat No. 21 Utah 26–23 in overtime

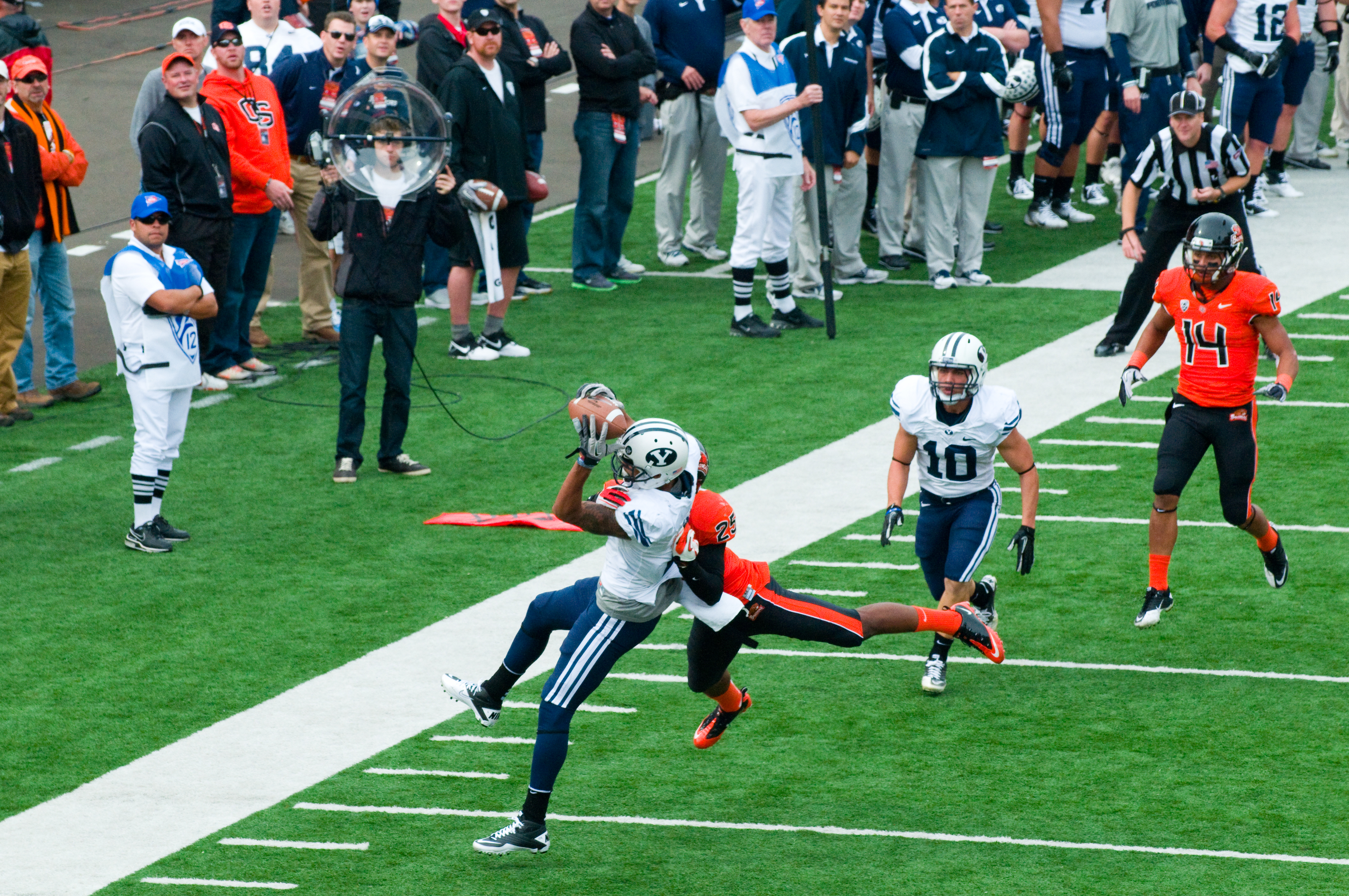
BYU wide receiver Cody Hoffman making a catch at Reser Stadium in Corvallis, Oregon in a 2011 game against Oregon State, which the Cougars won 38–28.

Former Chicago Bears offensive coordinator Gary Crowton was hired to replace Edwards. His first season in 2001 was successful, earning a 12–2 record and running back Luke Staley earning the Doak Walker Award, but the Cougars posted losing records the following three seasons (including only nine conference wins)–BYU's first losing records in three decades. His teams also received negative publicity for infractions of the university's honor code. He was forced to resign on December 1, 2004. BYU originally offered the job to Utah defensive coordinator Kyle Whittingham, who had played for Edwards in the late 1970s. However, when Whittingham opted instead to become head coach at Utah, the Cougars instead offered the job to BYU defensive coordinator Bronco Mendenhall, who accepted.

Bronco Mendenhall brought stability and success to the BYU program after the Crowton years. At the time of his hiring, the 38-year-old Mendenhall was the second youngest Division 1 football head coach in the country. As the legendary LaVell Edwards told him shortly after being hired, "‘You have a tough job.’ Then there was a pause and silence,” says Mendenhall. “It wasn't very comforting to hear that. But then he just said, ‘But it's a great job.’”

Mendenhall led BYU to a bowl game every season he was head coach and saw Top 25 finishes in 2006, 2007, 2008, and 2009.

=== Independent (2011–2022) ===
On September 1, 2010, BYU announced it would begin competition as a football independent starting in the 2011 season, primarily due to years of frustration with the lack of TV coverage in the Mountain West Conference and the University of Utah's departure for the Pac-12 Conference. That same day, BYU announced an 8-year contract with ESPN in which 11 games would be broadcast on one of the ESPN networks and BYU would retain the rights to utilize its on-campus broadcasting facilities and nationally syndicated station. The Cougars were reportedly considered for invitations by the Big XII Conference and former Big East Conference for all sports during this period, but neither opted to add BYU.

In February 2011, CFL's Most Outstanding Canadian Award-winner Ben Cahoon joined the coaching staff as the wide receivers coach.

In 2011, BYU changed quarterbacks mid-season from sophomore Jake Heaps to junior Riley Nelson, and in 2012 three different quarterbacks were utilized at different points in the season. During the 2012 offseason, graduated defensive end Ziggy Ansah was drafted as the No. 5 overall pick of the 2013 NFL draft, tied for the highest draft BYU alumnus with Jim McMahon '82. For the 2013 BYU football season, the Cougars were slated to compete against four pre-season-ranked teams.

In January 2015, the Atlantic Coast Conference (ACC), which had previously announced that from 2017 forward all members had to play at least one non-conference game each season against a "Power 5" team (i.e., a school in the ACC, Big Ten, Big 12, Pac-12, or SEC, plus Notre Dame, an FBS independent but otherwise an ACC member), announced that games against BYU would not count toward the "Power 5" requirement, a stipulation also held by the SEC. Weeks later, both leagues reversed course and opted to count games against BYU and the other remaining FBS independent at that time, Army, toward meeting the P5 provision. In the case of the SEC, this change in policy was driven more by the trend of "Power 5" leagues requiring nine conference games. At the time of the report, the Big Ten, Big 12, and Pac-12 either had nine-game conference schedules or were introducing them in the near future. The ACC had an eight-game schedule, but also has a scheduling alliance with Notre Dame that has five ACC members playing the Fighting Irish each season. Additionally, three SEC teams had a total of five games scheduled with BYU from 2015 to 2020. In July 2015, the Big Ten announced that games against BYU would count toward the conference's "Power 5" scheduling requirement that takes effect in 2016. In late 2015, the Big 12 added a Power Five non-conference scheduling requirement and stated that BYU would not count toward filling that mandate.

On December 4, 2015, Mendenhall accepted the head coach position with Virginia in the Atlantic Coast Conference (ACC). His 99 wins in 11 seasons are second all-time in school history, behind only Edwards.

BYU spent more than a week courting Navy Midshipmen football head coach Ken Niumatalolo to take over the Cougars program. After several days, which included a visit to Provo and public remarks about considering the job, Niumatalolo ultimately declined BYU's offer in order to remain with Navy. Athletics director Tom Holmoe moved on to several other potential candidates and on Dec. 19 introduced Oregon State defensive coordinator and former Cougars fullback Kalani Sitake as BYU's next head coach.

At the time of his hiring, Sitake said, "I'm grateful for everything BYU gave me as a player. It's a dream come true for me to return home."

While many have questioned whether independence long-term is sustainable, from a financial perspective it appeared to be so. BYU's ESPN contract was worth somewhere between $6–10 million annually, which was on par with what ACC teams received from a contract also negotiated around the same time. ESPN was happy enough with its contract with BYU that it exercised an option to extend the deal through the 2019 season. ESPN also helped BYU line up bowl deals, since as an independent, BYU was not part of any league bowl tie-ins.

BYU's estimated $67 million in annual revenue placed it 55th in total revenue in 2018. That was comparable to the lower half of the Pac-12 and more than any Group of Five school, including every Mountain West institution. In fact, the highest earning Mountain West school, San Diego State, generated $30 million in revenue, with more than 46% of that subsidized by the state of California. The Group of Five school with the most revenue without a subsidy was the University of Connecticut with $43 million, still nearly $20 million below BYU.

As an independent, BYU was one of just a handful of schools in all of college athletics to generate a profit, enjoying five times the Group of Five average revenue ($13 million).

=== Big 12 (2023-present) ===
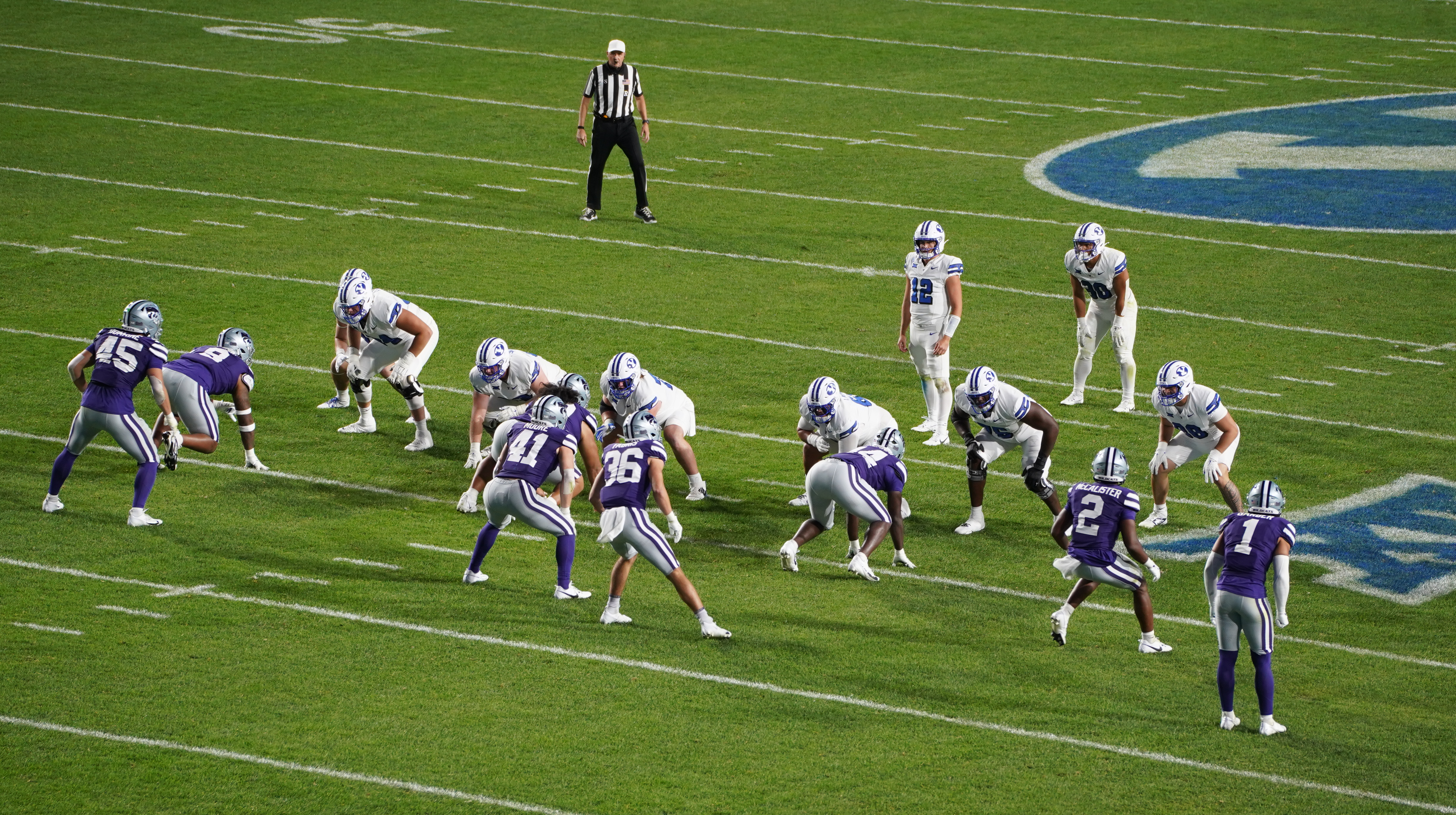
BYU playing against Kansas State in 2024

On September 10, 2021, the Big 12 Conference announced they had invited BYU to join the conference, along with Cincinnati, UCF, and Houston. BYU accepted the invitation and began competing in the conference in the 2023 season.

BYU struggled during its first season of Big 12 play in 2023, finishing 5–7 overall with a 2–7 conference record. The Cougars improved significantly in their second season of Big 12 play in 2024, finishing in a four-way tie for first in the conference with a 11–2 overall record (7–2 in conference). They ended the season with a 36–14 win over a ranked Colorado team in the Alamo Bowl, and finished ranked 14th in the Coaches' poll and 13th in the AP poll.

In 2025, BYU started the season 8-0 for the second year in a row (the first pair of consecutive starts of 8-0 or better in program history) and reached a peak AP rank of No. 8 before losing their first game to No. 9 Texas Tech. This would be BYU's only loss of the regular season, as they finished 11-1 and tied with Texas Tech for first place in the Big 12 standings. BYU qualified for the Big 12 Championship Game against Texas Tech, making their first conference title appearance in the Big 12. The Cougars lost to the Red Raiders and were left out of the final College Football Playoff field as a result, finishing at No. 12 in the playoff rankings. BYU was invited to play in the Pop Tarts Bowl against No. 22 Georgia Tech. The Cougars won that game 25-21 and finished the season 12–2, completing their first 12-win season since 2001.

During the offseason following the 2025 season, Kalani Sitake received an offer from Penn State to become the Nittany Lions' new head coach. While there was initially mutual interest between Sitake and Penn State, he ultimately chose to remain at BYU and agreed to a long-term extension which included a substantial pay raise. On January 1, 2026, BYU defensive coordinator Jay Hill announced that he had accepted the same position at Michigan. Defensive backs coach Jernaro Gilford also accepted the same role at Michigan. On January 7, BYU announced the promotion of defensive ends coach and special teams coordinator Kelly Poppinga to the position of defensive coordinator, and the hiring of Boise State defensive backs coach Demario Warren for the same position at BYU.

== Conference affiliations ==
- Rocky Mountain Faculty Athletic Conference (1922–1937)
- Mountain States Athletic Conference/Skyline Conference (1938–1961)
- Western Athletic Conference (1962–1998)
- Mountain West Conference (1999–2010)
- FBS Independent (2011–2022)
- Big 12 Conference (2023–present)

== Championships ==
=== National championships ===
In 1984, BYU was awarded a consensus National Championship.

Year	Coach	Selectors	Record	Bowl	Result	Final AP	Final Coaches
1984	Lavell Edwards	AP, Billingsley, Football Research, FW, National Championship Foundation, National Football Foundation, Poling, Sagarin (ELO-Chess), UPI, USA/CNN	13–0	Holiday	W 24–17 vs. Michigan	No. 1	No. 1

=== Conference championships ===
BYU has won 23 conference championships, seven shared and sixteen outright.

Season	Conference	Coach	Overall record	Conference record
1965	Western Athletic Conference	Tommy Hudspeth	6–4	4–1
1974	Western Athletic Conference	Lavell Edwards	7–4–1	6–0–1
1976†	Western Athletic Conference	Lavell Edwards	9–3	6–1
1977†	Western Athletic Conference	Lavell Edwards	9–2	6–1
1978	Western Athletic Conference	Lavell Edwards	9–4	5–1
1979	Western Athletic Conference	Lavell Edwards	11–1	7–0
1980	Western Athletic Conference	Lavell Edwards	12–1	6–1
1981	Western Athletic Conference	Lavell Edwards	11–2	7–1
1982	Western Athletic Conference	Lavell Edwards	8–4	7–1
1983	Western Athletic Conference	Lavell Edwards	11–1	7–0
1984	Western Athletic Conference	Lavell Edwards	13–0	8–0
1985†	Western Athletic Conference	Lavell Edwards	11–3	7–1
1989	Western Athletic Conference	Lavell Edwards	10–3	7–1
1990	Western Athletic Conference	Lavell Edwards	10–3	7–1
1991	Western Athletic Conference	Lavell Edwards	8–3–2	7–0–1
1992†	Western Athletic Conference	Lavell Edwards	8–5	6–2
1993†	Western Athletic Conference	Lavell Edwards	6–6	6–2
1995†	Western Athletic Conference	Lavell Edwards	7–4	6–2
1996	Western Athletic Conference	Lavell Edwards	14–1	10–0
1999†	Mountain West Conference	Lavell Edwards	8–4	5–2
2001	Mountain West Conference	Gary Crowton	12–2	7–0
2006	Mountain West Conference	Bronco Mendenhall	11–2	8–0
2007	Mountain West Conference	Bronco Mendenhall	11–2	8–0

† Co-champions

=== Division championships ===
BYU has won two division championships, both in the Western Athletic Conference.

Season	Division	Coach	Opponent	CG result
1996	WAC - Mountain	LaVell Edwards	Wyoming	W 28–25^{OT}
1998†	WAC - Pacific	LaVell Edwards	Air Force	L 13–20

† Co-champions

=== Associated Press Poll appearances ===
As of Week 1 of the 2025 season, BYU has made 304 appearances in the Associated Press poll and been ranked in the final Associated Press poll of the season twenty one times.

Year	Ranking	Record
1977	No. 20	9–2
1979	No. 13	11–1
1980	No. 12	12–1
1981	No. 13	11–2
1983	No. 7	11–1
1984	No. 1	13–0
1985	No. 16	11–3
1989	No. 22	10–3
1990	No. 22	10–3
1991	No. 23	8–3–2
1994	No. 18	10–3
1996	No. 5	14–1
2001	No. 25	12–2
2006	No. 16	11–2
2007	No. 14	11–2
2008	No. 25	10–3
2009	No. 12	11–2
2020	No. 11	11–1
2021	No. 19	10–3
2024	No. 13	11–2
2025	No. 11	12–2

== Bowl games ==
BYU has made 42 bowl appearances with a record of 19–22–1. They have played in the Holiday Bowl (4–6–1), the Cotton Bowl Classic (1–0), the Las Vegas Bowl (3–3), the Copper Bowl (1–0), the Tangerine/Citrus Bowl (0–2), the Freedom Bowl (1–1), the Liberty Bowl (0–2), the Aloha Bowl (0–1), the Fiesta Bowl (0–1), the Motor City Bowl (0–1), the All-American Bowl (0–1), the New Mexico Bowl (2–0), the Armed Forces Bowl (1–0), the Poinsettia Bowl (2–0), Fight Hunger Bowl (0–1), the Miami Beach Bowl (0–1), the Famous Idaho Potato Bowl (1–0), Hawaii Bowl (0–1), Boca Raton Bowl (1–0), Independence Bowl (0–1), Alamo Bowl (1–0), and the Pop-Tarts Bowl (1–0).

No.	Date	Bowl	Opponent	Result
1	December 28, 1974	Fiesta Bowl	Oklahoma State	L 6–16
2	December 18, 1976	Tangerine Bowl	Oklahoma State	L 21–49
3	December 22, 1978	Holiday Bowl	Navy	L 16–23
4	December 21, 1979	Holiday Bowl	Indiana	L 37–38
5	December 19, 1980	Holiday Bowl	SMU	W 46–45
6	December 18, 1981	Holiday Bowl	Washington State	W 38–36
7	December 17, 1982	Holiday Bowl	Ohio State	L 17–47
8	December 23, 1983	Holiday Bowl	Missouri	W 21–17
9	December 21, 1984	Holiday Bowl	Michigan	W 24–17
10	December 28, 1985	Florida Citrus Bowl	Ohio State	L 7–10
11	December 30, 1986	Freedom Bowl	UCLA	L 10–31
12	December 22, 1987	All-American Bowl	Virginia	L 16–22
13	December 29, 1988	Freedom Bowl	Colorado	W 20–17
14	December 29, 1989	Holiday Bowl	Penn State	L 39–50
15	December 29, 1990	Holiday Bowl	Texas A&M	L 14–65
16	December 30, 1991	Holiday Bowl	Iowa	T 13–13
17	December 25, 1992	Aloha Bowl	Kansas	L 20–23
18	December 30, 1993	Holiday Bowl	Ohio State	L 21–28
19	December 29, 1994	Copper Bowl	Oklahoma	W 31–6
20	January 1, 1997	Cotton Bowl Classic	Kansas State	W 19–15
21	December 31, 1998	Liberty Bowl	Tulane	L 27–41
22	December 27, 1999	Motor City Bowl	Marshall	L 3–21
23	December 31, 2001	Liberty Bowl	Louisville	L 10–28
24	December 22, 2005	Las Vegas Bowl	California	L 28–35
25	December 21, 2006	Las Vegas Bowl	Oregon	W 38–8
26	December 22, 2007	Las Vegas Bowl	UCLA	W 17–16
27	December 21, 2008	Las Vegas Bowl	Arizona	L 21–31
28	December 22, 2009	Maaco Bowl Las Vegas	Oregon State	W 44–20
29	December 18, 2010	New Mexico Bowl	UTEP	W 52–24
30	December 30, 2011	Armed Forces Bowl	Tulsa	W 24–21
31	December 20, 2012	Poinsettia Bowl	San Diego State	W 23–6
32	December 27, 2013	Fight Hunger Bowl	Washington	L 16–31
33	December 22, 2014	Miami Beach Bowl	Memphis	L 48–55 ^{2OT}
34	December 19, 2015	Las Vegas Bowl	Utah	L 28–35
35	December 21, 2016	Poinsettia Bowl	Wyoming	W 24–21
36	December 21, 2018	Famous Idaho Potato Bowl	Western Michigan	W 49–18
37	December 24, 2019	Hawaii Bowl	Hawaii	L 34–38
38	December 22, 2020	Boca Raton Bowl	UCF	W 49–23
39	December 18, 2021	Independence Bowl	UAB	L 28–31
40	December 17, 2022	New Mexico Bowl	SMU	W 24–23
41	December 28, 2024	Alamo Bowl	Colorado	W 36–14
42	December 27, 2025	Pop-Tarts Bowl	Georgia Tech	W 25–21

== Rivalries ==
BYU's football program has two historic rivalries: one with the Utah Utes in a game referred to as "The Holy War", and another with the Utah State Aggies in "The Battle for the Old Wagon Wheel". BYU competes with Utah, and Utah State for the Beehive Boot. Both of these series have experienced dormancy in recent years due to various conference changes between the three programs.

=== Utah ===
Utah leads the series 59–34–4 through the 2025 season.

=== Utah State ===
BYU leads the series with Utah State 51–37–3 through the 2022 season.

== All-time record vs. current Big 12 teams ==
Official record (including any NCAA imposed vacates and forfeits) against all current Big 12 opponents as of the completion of the 2025 regular season and bowl games.

Opponent	Won	Lost	Tied	Pct.	Streak	First meeting	Last meeting
Arizona	15	12	1	.554	Won 6	1936	2026
Arizona State	9	21	0	.276	Lost 1	1935	2024
Baylor	3	2	0	.600	Won 2	1983	2024
Cincinnati	4	0	0	1.000	Won 4	2015	2025
Colorado	5	8	1	.393	Won 4	1923	2025
Houston	4	0	0	1.000	Won 4	2013	2024
Iowa State	1	5	0	.167	Won 1	1968	2025
Kansas	0	3	0	.000	Lost 3	1992	2024
Kansas State	5	4	0	.556	Won 3	1957	2024
Oklahoma State	1	3	0	.250	Won 1	1974	2024
TCU	6	7	0	.462	Won 1	1987	2025
Texas Tech	1	3	0	.250	Lost 2	1940	2025
UCF	4	2	0	.800	Won 3	2011	2025
Utah	34	59	4	.366	Won 3	1896	2025
West Virginia	1	2	0	.333	Won 1	2016	2025
Totals	91	130	6	.414			

== Individual accomplishments ==
=== Honors and awards ===
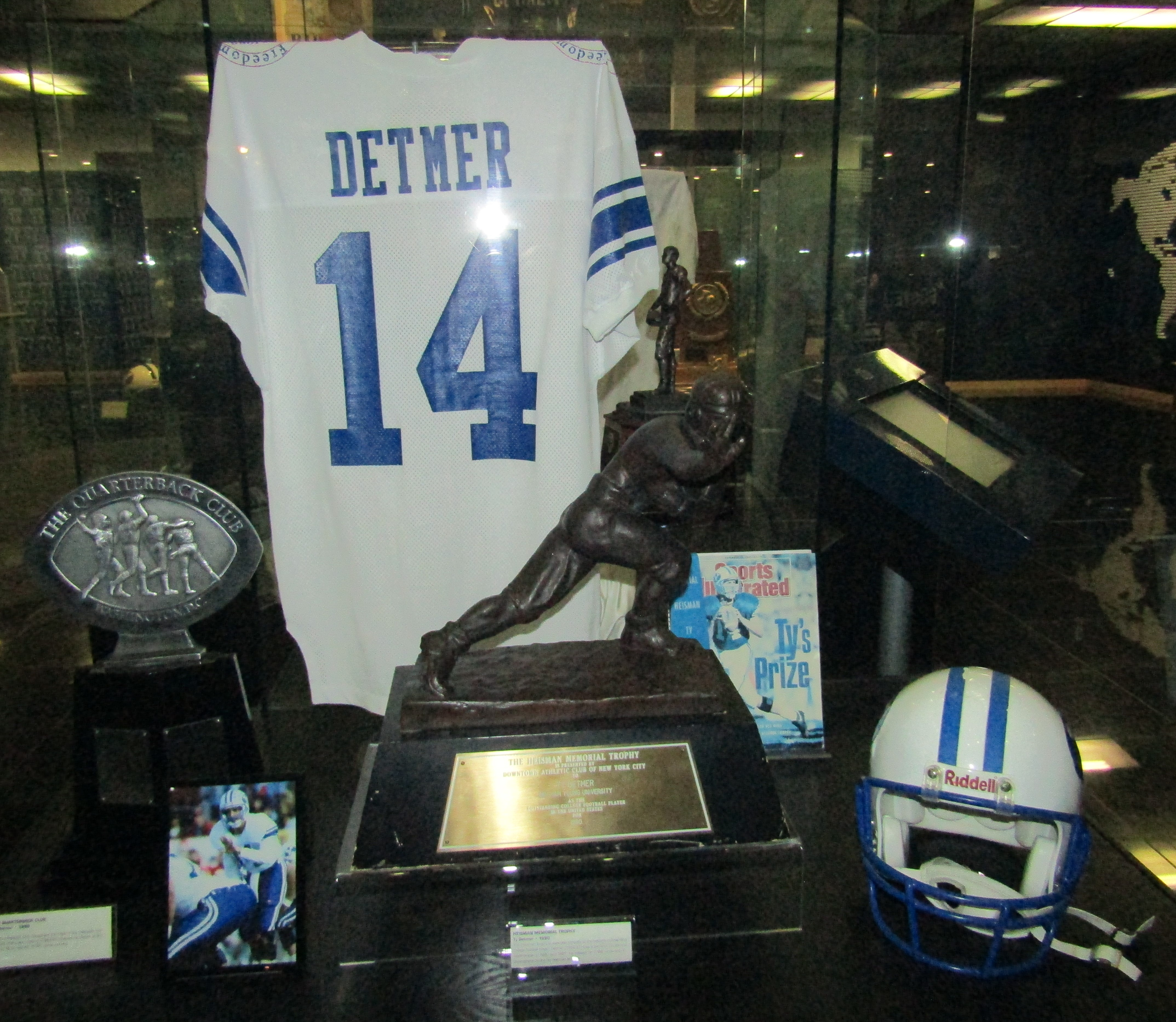
1990 Heisman Trophy winner Ty Detmer's jersey and trophy on display at the BYU Legacy Hall

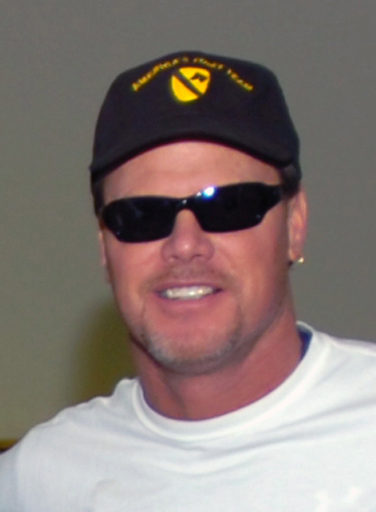
QB Jim McMahon

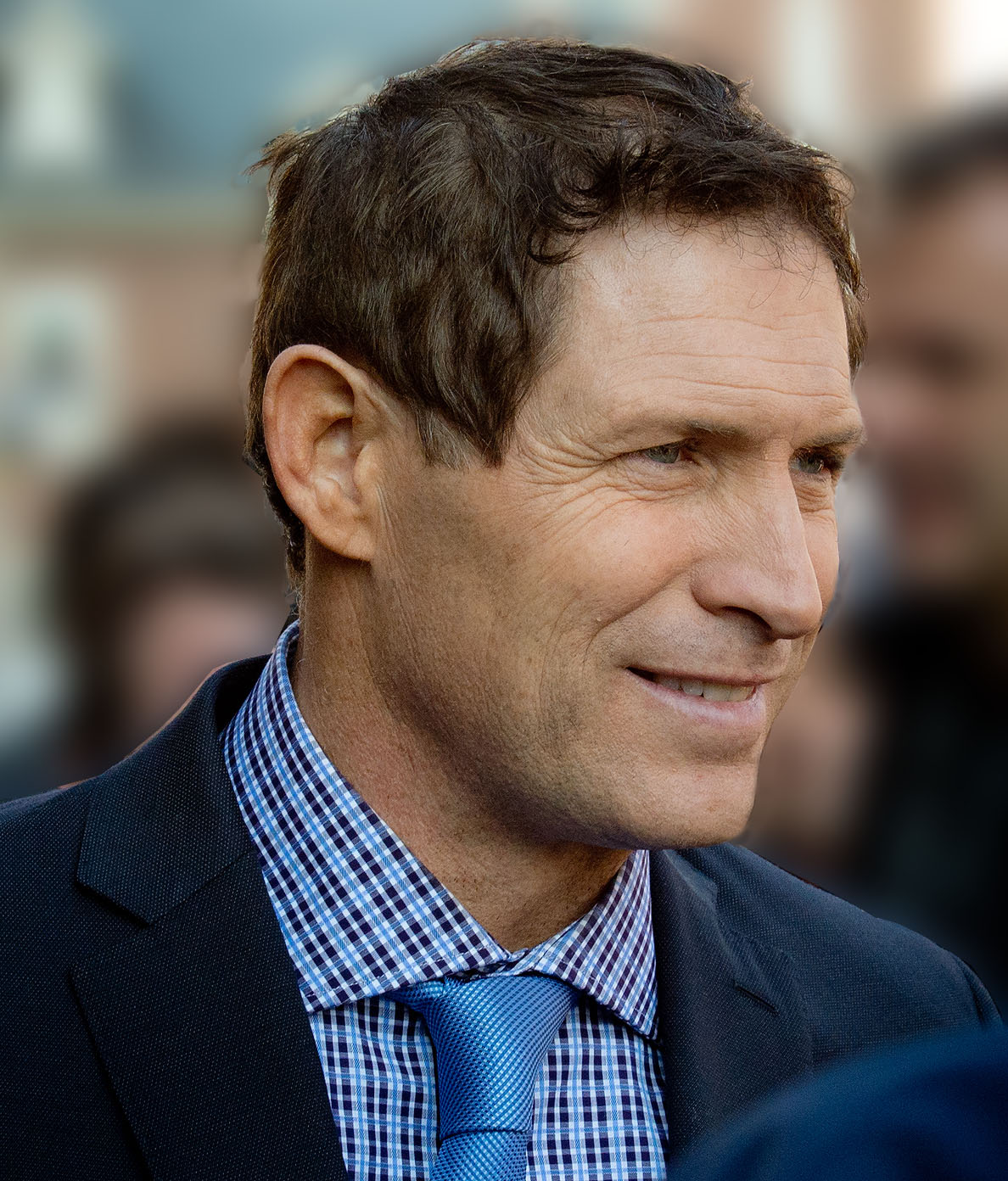
QB Steve Young

Team awards for the BYU Cougars include 23 conference titles and one national championship in 1984. For player awards, BYU has produced 52 All-Americans (13 Consensus All-Americans).

- Heisman Trophy

Ty Detmer – 1990

- Heisman Trophy finalists

Gary Sheide – 1974... 8th
Gifford Nielsen — 1976... 6th
Marc Wilson — 1979... 3rd
Jim McMahon — 1980... 5th
Jim McMahon — 1981... 3rd
Steve Young — 1983... 2nd
Robbie Bosco — 1984... 3rd
Robbie Bosco — 1985... 3rd
Ty Detmer — 1989... 9th
Ty Detmer — 1991... 3rd
Zach Wilson — 2020... 8th

- Maxwell Award

Ty Detmer – 1990

- Davey O'Brien Award

Jim McMahon – 1981
Steve Young — 1983
Ty Detmer — 1990, 1991

- Sammy Baugh Trophy

Gary Sheide – 1974
Marc Wilson — 1979
Jim McMahon — 1981
Steve Young — 1983
Robbie Bosco — 1984
Ty Detmer — 1991
Steve Sarkisian — 1996

- Doak Walker Award

Luke Staley – 2001

- Jim Brown Trophy

Luke Staley – 2001

- Outland Trophy

Jason Buck – 1986
Mohammed Elewonibi — 1989

•Polynesian College Football Player of the Year

Zach Wilson-2020

For coaching, LaVell Edwards received the Bobby Dodd Coach of the Year Award in 1979, the AFCA (Kodak) Coach of the Year Award in 1984, and the Amos Alonzo Stagg Award (career achievement) in 2003.

=== Consensus All-Americans ===
BYU has had 14 Consensus All-Americans.

Year	Player	Position
1979	Marc Wilson	QB
1980	Nick Eyre	OT
1981	Jim McMahon	QB
1982	Gordon Hudson	TE
1983	Gordon Hudson	TE
1983	Steve Young	QB
1986	Jason Buck	DL
1989	Mo Elewonibi	OL
1990	Chris Smith	TE
1990	Ty Detmer	QB
1991	Ty Detmer	QB
2001	Luke Staley	RB
2009	Dennis Pitta	TE
2020	Brady Christensen	OL

=== College Football Hall of Fame ===
Name	Position	Years at BYU	Year inducted
Gifford Nielsen	QB	1973–77	1994
Marc Wilson	QB	1975–79	1996
Jim McMahon	QB	1977–81	1998
Lavell Edwards	Coach	1972–00	2004
Steve Young	QB	1980–83	2005
Gordon Hudson	TE	1980–83	2009
Ty Detmer	QB	1987–91	2012

=== Retired numbers ===
BYU Cougars retired numbers
No.	Player	Pos.	Tenure	Date retired	Ref.
6	Marc Wilson	QB	1975–1979	September 16, 2017	
6	Robbie Bosco	QB	1981–1985	September 16, 2017	
6	Luke Staley	RB	1999–2001	September 16, 2017	
8	Steve Young	QB	1980–1983	August 28, 2003	
9	Jim McMahon	QB	1977–1981	October 3, 2014	
14	Gifford Nielsen	QB	1973–1977	September 1, 2007	
14	Ty Detmer	QB	1987–1991	September 1, 2007	
40	Eldon Fortie	QB/RB	1960–1962	1963	
81	Marion Probert	DE	1952–1954	1977	

== BYU and the NFL ==
=== Pro Football Hall of Fame members ===
Name	Position	Seasons in NFL	Year inducted
Steve Young	QB	15	2005

=== NFL Head Coaches ===
- Andy Reid, offensive tackle 1978–80, starter on 1980 Holiday Bowl champion team, three-time Super Bowl Champion head coach (LIV, LVII, LVIII with the Kansas City Chiefs), 2002 AP Coach of the Year as head coach of the Philadelphia Eagles, 5th all-time in NFL history in wins overall, 2nd most playoff wins in NFL history.
- Brian Billick, Tight End 1974, Graduate Assistant 1978. Went on to coached at San Diego State (1981–85), Utah State (1986–88), and Stanford (1989–91) before heading to the NFL. From 1992 to 1998, he coached at the Minnesota Vikings, and between 1999 and 2007, Brian was the head coach of Baltimore Ravens. In his second year as head coach with the Ravens, Brian lead them on to win Super Bowl XXXV in the 2000–01 season.

== Uniforms ==
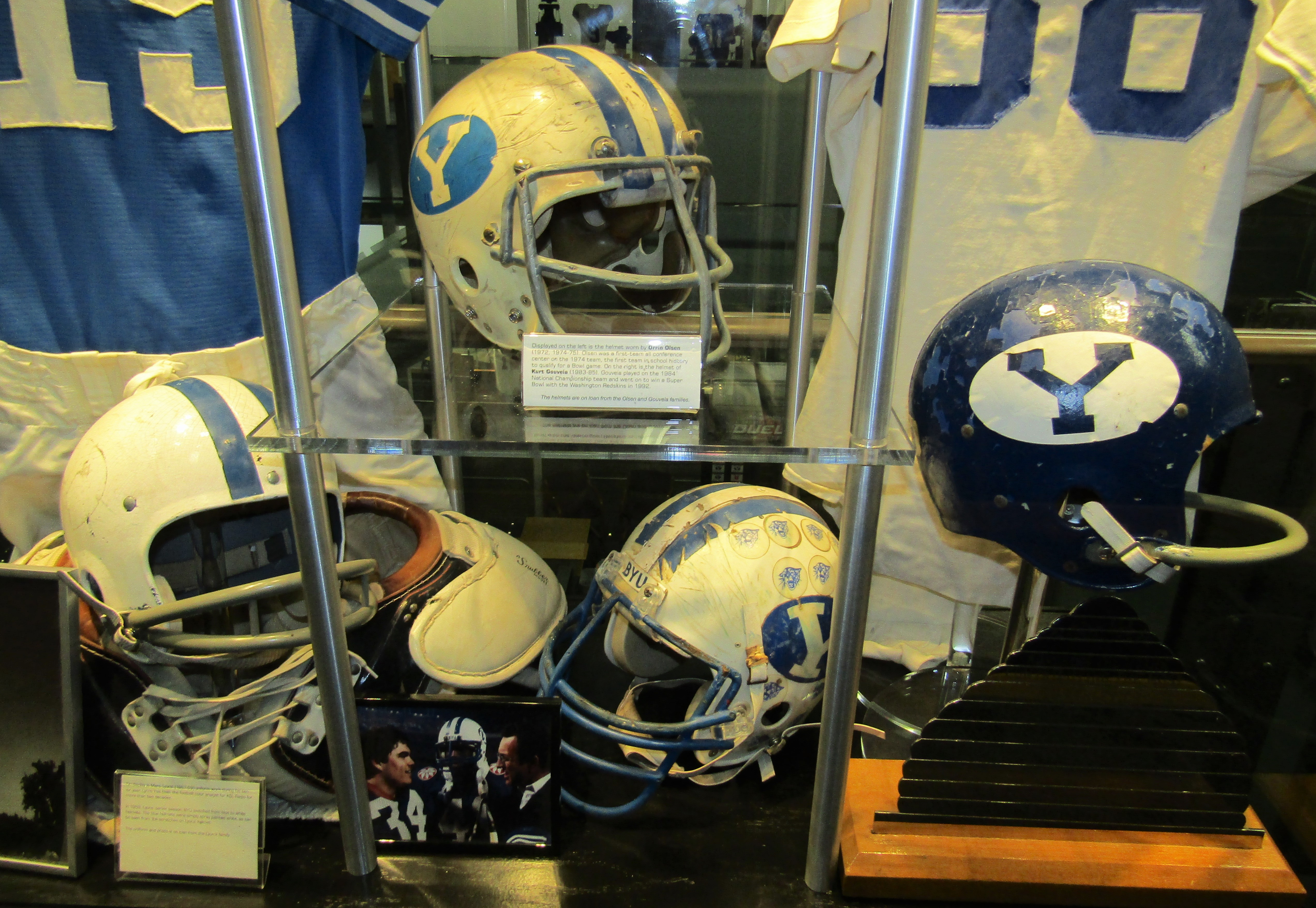
Historical BYU helmets on display at the Legacy Hall

From the 1970s to 1999—a period coinciding with some of the school's best and most prominent football seasons—BYU school colors were royal blue and white. The football team generally wore royal blue jerseys and white pants at home, and white jerseys and royal blue pants on the road.

In 1999, Coach Edwards' penultimate year, the school colors switched to dark blue, white, and tan, and the football helmets switched from white to dark blue. The block 'Y' remained on the sides of the helmet but received a new, more modern treatment. The home uniforms consisted of dark blue jerseys with white "bib" and dark blue pants, and the away uniforms consisted of white jerseys with white pants. These new uniforms were disliked by both the conservative fans in Provo and the NCAA, who required the team to remove the white bib on the front of the blue home jersey in 2000 (NCAA rules require that a team's jersey have a single dominant color). The home jersey thereafter was modified with blue replacing the white on the bib area.

These uniforms lasted until 2004, when a uniform new style incorporating New York Jets-style shoulder stripes was introduced (the helmets remained the same). The new uniforms were worn in a "mix-and-match" strategy—e.g., the home blue jerseys were worn with either blue or white pants and the white away jerseys were worn with either blue or white pants. This uniform incarnation lasted for only one season.

Ultimately, the traditional design with the white helmet and former logo was re-introduced for the 2005 season. While the uniforms were also changed to be similar to the 1980s uniforms, the darker blue remained instead of the former royal blue, but all tan highlights were eliminated. This change was done at the insistence of new head coach Bronco Mendenhall, who wanted to return the team to the successful traditions of the 1980s. Normally, it takes a minimum of 1–2 years to create, design and approve a uniform change. When Nike, the team's uniform supplier, said that they could not possibly make the change in just five months, former head coach and BYU legend LaVell Edwards made a call to Nike and asked them to help the new Cougar coach. Edwards had worked with Nike on several occasions since his retirement, and with the legendary coach's weight behind the request, BYU was able to take the field in 2005 in new, traditional uniforms. One slight change in the uniform came in the 2007 season, when a small traditional 'Y' logo was added to the bottom of the collar.

In 2009, BYU used a throwback jersey paying tribute to the 25-year anniversary of the 1984 national championship. They were the same design as the contemporary jerseys, but used royal blue instead of navy blue. They were introduced against rival University of Utah and again in the Las Vegas Bowl against Oregon State.

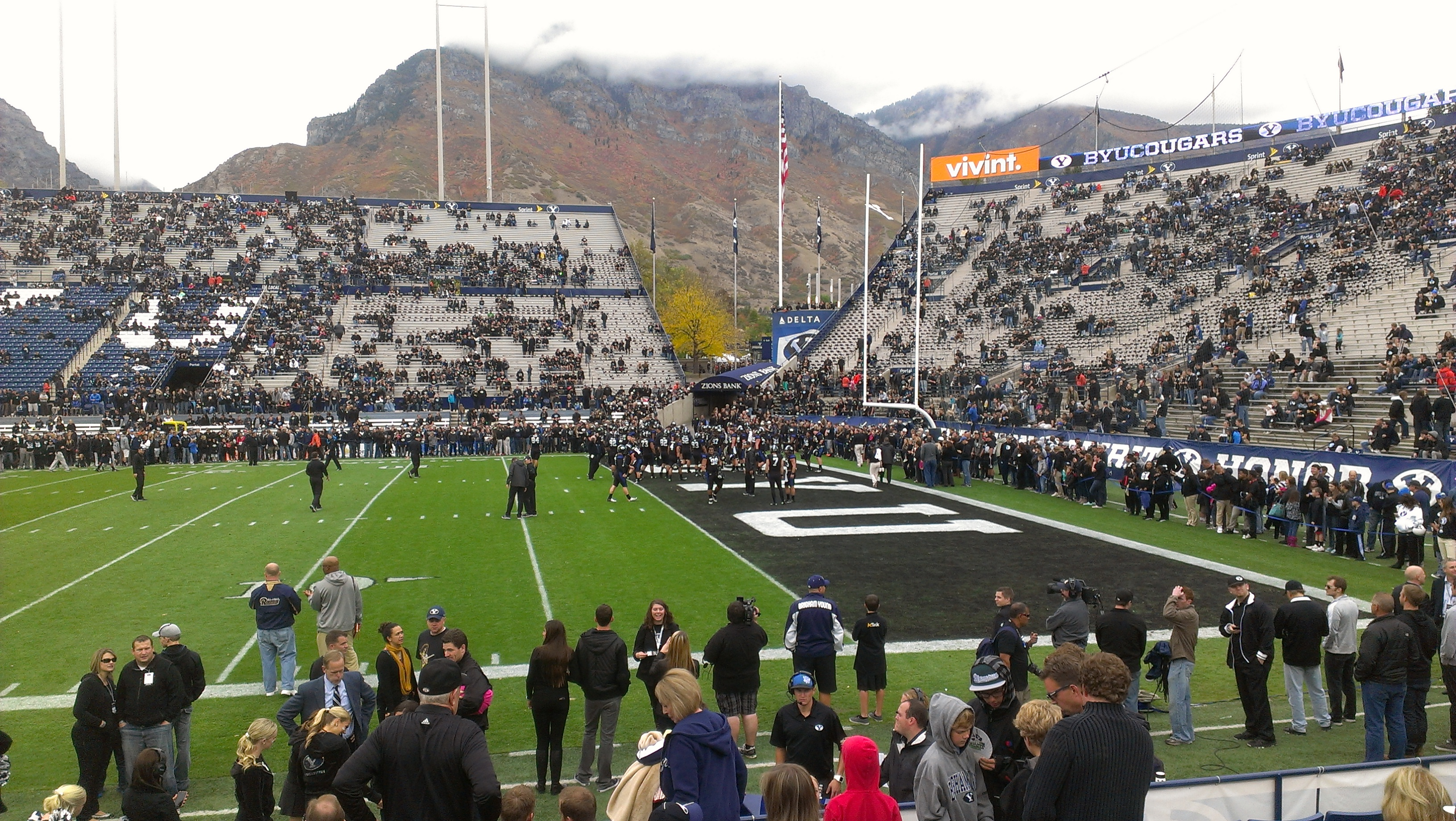
BYU Blackout Uniforms in 2012

On October 13, 2012, BYU debuted a "blackout" jersey for a home game against Oregon State with royal blue accents and black facemasks. The endzones were also painted black for the occasion. In subsequent seasons, BYU has often had one blackout game per year.

In 2013, BYU introduced an all-royal combination (with the exception of the helmets, which remained its traditional white) against Utah. They wore it once more the following year against Utah State. The combination did not reappear until the 2018 Potato Bowl against Western Michigan. In 2015, renditions of the "throwback" royal blue uniforms appeared, once in the team's Homecoming game against East Carolina, and again against Utah in the Las Vegas Bowl.

With the hiring of Kalani Sitake as head coach at the end of 2015, BYU has seen the gradual return of wearing royal blue combinations. They initially only made appearances in rivalry and other campus event games, but from 2017 onward, they have been worn more regularly. In 2019, several new combinations were introduced, including an all-white combination with royal accents, and a variation on the "away" combination with some styling changes to pay tribute to the uniforms of the 1960s. This last alternate uniform was accompanied by a throwback midfield logo and an endzone paint scheme that matched the field design used by BYU in the 1960s. A more modern design of the retro combination appeared in a game at the end of the season at San Diego State.

In 2020, the team reintroduced a gray facemask that paid tribute to former Cougar and Houston Oilers quarterback Gifford Nielsen for their game at the University of Houston. The team wore the gray facemasks several times that season, which was highlighted by the most frequent usage of the royal blue in decades.

In March 2021, the program added two new helmets to their collection, with royal blue helmets paying tribute to the teams of the 1970s and navy blue helmets reminiscent of the combinations used from 1999 to 2004; the navy helmet especially recognized the highly successful 2001 team that featured players such as Luke Staley and Brandon Doman.

== Alumni ==
As of 2008, 146 BYU Cougars football players have gone on to play professional football. Team alumni have competed in 48 NFL Super Bowls, including Super Bowl MVP Steve Young and two-time Super Bowl winner Jim McMahon. One former Cougar has won multiple Super Bowls as a coach, Andy Reid who won Super Bowl LIV, Super Bowl LVII, and Super Bowl LVIII as a head coach with the Kansas City Chiefs and Super Bowl XXXI as an assistant with the Green Bay Packers.

== Future opponents ==
=== Future non-conference opponents ===
Future schedules as of December 22, 2025.

2026	2027	2028	2029	2030	2031	2032	2033	2034	2035
Utah Tech	Oregon State	vs Oregon State^{1}	Idaho State	Weber State	Southern Utah	Michigan State	at Virginia Tech	USF	Missouri
at Colorado State	Weber State	Boston College	Colorado State	Virginia Tech	Navy		Coastal Carolina		at Troy
Notre Dame	at Notre Dame		at Boston College	at Northern Illinois	SMU				

1. Vegas Kickoff Classic, Las Vegas, Nevada

=== Future Big 12 opponents ===
On November 1, 2023, BYU's Big 12 opponents from 2024 through 2027 were revealed, with their rivalry game against Utah being a protected annual game.

Future BYU Cougars Football Schedule
2026	2027
vs Arizona	vs Colorado
vs Arizona State	vs Kansas
vs Baylor	vs Texas Tech
vs Iowa State	vs Utah
vs Cincinnati	at Arizona State
at Kansas	at Houston
at TCU	at Oklahoma State
at UCF	at Kansas State
at Utah	at West Virginia

== See also ==
- Haka performed by non-New Zealand sports teams § Brigham Young University
- American football in the United States
- College football
