= List of Utah Valley University people =

The following is a list of notable people associated with Utah Valley University, located in the American city of Orem, Utah.

== Notable alumni ==
- Tanner Adell
- Beth Brower
- A. J. Cook
- Michelle Despain
- Christopher Fogt
- Akwasi Frimpong
- Parley G. Hellewell
- Chelsie Hightower
- David Hinkins
- Greg Hughes
- C. Jane Kendrick
- John Knotwell
- Matthew S. Petersen
- Noelle Pikus-Pace
- Gary Lee Price
- G. William Richards
- Wesley Silcox
- Matangi Tonga
- Joseph Vogel

== Notable faculty ==
- James Arrington
- Alex Caldiero
- Scott Carrier
- Alan W. Clarke
- Carol Lynn Curchoe
- Eugene England
- Dennis Fairclough
- Val Hale
- Jeffrey Nielsen
- Boyd Petersen
- Bennion Spencer
