= 2006 NCAA Division I cross country championships =

2006 cross-country running meet of the NCAA (Division I)

2006 NCAA Division I Cross Country Championships
- Organisers: NCAA
- Edition: 68th–Men; 26th–Women
- Date: November 20, 2006
- Host city: (Indiana) Terre Haute, IN
- Venue: Indiana State University; LaVern Gibson Championship Cross Country Course
- Distances: 10 km–Men; 6 km–Women
- Participation: 250–Men; 253–Women; 503–Total athletes

The 2006 NCAA Division I Cross Country Championships were the 68th annual NCAA Men's Division I Cross Country Championship and the 26th annual NCAA Women's Division I Cross Country Championship to determine the team and individual national champions of NCAA Division I men's and women's collegiate cross country running in the United States. In all, four different titles were contested: men's and women's individual and team championships.

Held on November 20, 2006, the combined meet was the third of eight consecutive meets hosted by Indiana State University at the LaVern Gibson Championship Cross Country Course in Terre Haute, Indiana. The distance for the men's race was 10 kilometers (6.21 miles) while the distance for the women's race was 6 kilometers (3.73 miles).

The men's team championship was won by Colorado (94 points), the Buffaloes' third. The women's team championship was again won by Stanford (195 points), the Cardinal's fourth overall, second consecutive, and third in four years.

The two individual champions were, for the men, Josh Rohatinsky (BYU, 30:44.9) and, for the women, Sally Kipyego (Texas Tech, 20:11.1).

== Men's title ==
- Distance: 10,000 meters

=== Men's Team Result (Top 10) ===
Rank	Team	Points
1st place, gold medalist(s)	Colorado	94
2nd place, silver medalist(s)	Wisconsin	142
3rd place, bronze medalist(s)	Iona	172
4	Stanford	195
5	Oregon	196
5	Arkansas	196
7	Texas	246
8	William & Mary	292
9	Providence	293
10	Oklahoma State	356

=== Men's Individual Result (Top 10) ===
Rank	Name	Team	Time
1st place, gold medalist(s)	(United States) Josh Rohatinsky	BYU	30:44.9
2nd place, silver medalist(s)	(United States) Neftalem Araia	Stanford	30:52.6
3rd place, bronze medalist(s)	(United States) Jess Baumgartner	Southern Utah	30:53.2
4	(United States) Lopez Lomong	Northern Arizona	30:59.8
5	(Republic of Ireland) Martin Fagan	Providence	31:01.0
6	(United States) Galen Rupp	Oregon	31:03.0
7	(Kenya) Jacob Korir	Eastern Kentucky	31:03.5
8	(Kenya) Peter Kosgei	Arkansas	31:04.4
9	(United States) Aaron Aguayo	Arizona State	31:06.6
10	(United States) Robert Cheseret	Arizona	31:09.3

== Women's title ==
- Distance: 6,000 meters

=== Women's Team Result (Top 10) ===
Rank	Team	Points
1st place, gold medalist(s)	Stanford	195
2nd place, silver medalist(s)	Colorado	223
3rd place, bronze medalist(s)	Michigan	233
4	Wisconsin	262
5	Arkansas	286
6	Texas Tech	300
7	Providence	301
8	Illinois	304
9	UC Santa Barbara	318
1	Duke	320

=== Women's Individual Result (Top 10) ===
Rank	Name	Team	Time
1st place, gold medalist(s)	(Kenya) (United States) Sally Kipyego	Texas Tech	20:11.1
2nd place, silver medalist(s)	(United States) Jenny Barringer	Colorado	20:37.9
3rd place, bronze medalist(s)	(United States) Lindsay Donaldson	Yale	20:42.7
4	(United States) Arianna Lambie	Stanford	20:43.8
5	(United States) Julia Lucas	NC State	20:47.1
6	(United States) Kassi Andersen	BYU	20:53.8
7	(United Kingdom) Aine Hoban	Providence	21:04.3
8	(Burundi) (United States) Diane Nukuri	Iowa	21:05.7
9	(Kenya) Irene Kimaiyo	Texas Tech	21:06.3
10	(United States) Alissa McKaig	Michigan State	21:06.7
