= Haka performed by non-New Zealand sports teams =

Although haka is a traditional dance form of the Māori people of New Zealand, the use of a haka by the All Blacks rugby team before matches has made it familiar worldwide, and various haka have been adopted by sports teams outside New Zealand. Though some teams do contain Māori players, frequently haka have been performed by teams with players from other Polynesian groups, indicating that the performance art has become part of a pan-Polynesian sports culture.

The use of haka outside of New Zealand is controversial, as it can be considered culturally insensitive or offensive. There is also the matter of lyrical content of a haka possibly being at odds with the clothing, national origins, or other attributes of those performing it (such as a haka referencing New Zealand being performed by Americans, or one incorporating a reference to red or black clothing being performed by a sports team with grey or blue uniforms).

The Hawaiian war chant, or dance, is called the haʻa. It dates back centuries, and is one of the many Polynesian pre-war dances or chants. The traditional Hawaiian haʻa has been adopted by the Hawaii Rainbow Warriors football in place of the previously used haka.

== Kahuku "Red Raiders" ==
The Kahuku High School "Red Raiders" football team may have been the first American sports team to regularly perform a haka, doing so since 2001. The town of Kahuku is located just north of Laie, Hawaii, the home of Brigham Young University-Hawaii, which has many international students, including Polynesians from throughout the South Pacific, and both the student body and local community include many Fijians, Hawaiians, Māori, Samoans, Tahitians, and Tongans, among other ethnic groups. Today, the haka they perform is their own, "Kaipahua Kura", meaning 'Red Raider' in the Māori language. Written and choreographed by Seamus Fitzgerald, a special instructor at Brigham Young University-Hawaii and a Manager/Cultural Specialist in the Aotearoa or New Zealand section of the Polynesian Cultural Center in La'ie.

== Brigham Young University ==
The BYU Cougars football team began performing the haka with their season-opener in 2005. Minutes before kickoff, members of the BYU football team lined up on the southeast corner of the field and performed "Ka Mate" for a stadium full of cheering fans. Planned and prepared under a tight veil of secrecy for months, this new tradition was inspired by Bryce Mahuika, the team's only player of Māori descent.

Mahuika had recently lost his father. Over a thousand mourners attended his funeral, including Curtis Brown, the Cougars' star running back, to honor the fallen chief. Kyle and Bryce Mahuika, his sons, led them in a haka at the gravesite prior to lowering the casket into the ground. After returning from his father's funeral, Bryce Mahuika attended a team meeting where Bronco Mendenhall, the head coach, asked the team for personal requests that might help the team reach their goals in 2006. Bryce Mahuika went up to the front to thank everybody for their support, when he had the idea to do the haka to fire up the crowd and prepare for football games. He explained the origins and significance of the haka to the team, and they enthusiastically supported the idea.

There have been occasions where the BYU haka caused a near-altercation with the opposition.

The BYU rugby team performs a haka that was specially created for them.

BYU's use of the haka may have influenced local high school and community football teams. Timpview High School in Provo has performed the haka before games, and even some children's flag football teams have been seen performing it in Provo.

== University of Hawaii ==
During a hugely successful 2006 football season, it became tradition for the University of Hawaii Warriors football team to perform the Haka. It was introduced to the team by Tala Esera, who had performed the haka as a member of the Kahuku "Red Raiders", a high school football team.

Typically, the Warriors performed their version of the "Kapa O Pango" haka 20 minutes before the opening kickoff. After home wins, the team also performed a post-game version. However, before its final regular season game against Oregon State, the team was alerted by a university professor that the team may be infringing upon a copyright by performing the dance. The team ended up doing a 'variation' of the Haka before the Oregon State game, and planned on unveiling a 'new haka' before the team's Hawaii Bowl appearance against Arizona State on December 24. The All-Blacks rugby team does their Haka with permission from the Ngāti Toa iwi.

Through a spokeswoman, Hawaii's athletic director said: "Our legal department is looking into the issue. We don't believe we're violating any copyright laws at this time." Players on the team add that their version of the dance is not 'step for step' with the All-Blacks Haka.

While the team has adopted the "Kapa O Pango" as its game day ritual haka, the words speak of a black jersey, which is the official home color of the UH Warriors. However, the black jersey refers specifically to the All Blacks jersey, for whom the haka was written. The original version of the haka also mentions "Aotearoa", which is Māori for New Zealand, and "Ponga-Ra" meaning silver fern, both not applicable to the University of Hawaii football team. However, these words are dropped when the Warriors perform their version.

2006 Heisman Trophy Candidate Quarterback Colt Brennan was also filmed saying that he was learning the Samoan words to the haka when the haka is clearly Māori. (Brennan may have meant learning Samoan would assist him in learning to pronounce the Māori words, not that this haka was in Samoan. The Warriors do not say "Aotearoa" or New Zealand when they perform their version).

On December 24, 2006, the Warriors performed a haka prior to the Sheraton Hawaii Bowl game. in contrary to what was stated prior to the game, the Warriors, did not perform an entirely new haka but used the same gestures as "Kapa O Pango" as they have done all season. However, the chant itself could not be identified and it could not be confirmed if it remains the same or if certain words were changed to accommodate the team and the university specifically as the haka was not televised. YouTube hosts several clips of the Warriors' haka prior to the 2006 Hawaii Bowl game, but none have audio of sufficient quality to allow their chant at that time to be deciphered.

In 2007, linebacker Timo Paepule has now taken the leadership duties of the haka. The Warriors performed their usual version of "Kapa O Pango" for over 4,000 fans in attendance at their annual "Football Ohana Festival" which included a 90-minute practice session.

Paepule was quoted in saying that they plan to adjust the haka before the start of the 2007 fall season. Paepule also noted that the team actually prefers to perform the haka just for themselves and not as an attraction for the team.

In August 2007 the team announced that they would be dropping the Māori haka, in favour of a traditional Hawaiian war chant, which is called the Haʻa. The University of Hawaii's players composed their own Haʻa. Linebacker Brad Kalilimoku, defensive back Guyton Galdeira and defensive tackle Keala Watson worked together to write the words and create the movements for the ritual. The three players are native Hawaiians and have experience with the language. Galdeira's training in hula also added cultural flavor to the haʻa. Although many fans have asked for the lyrics so that they could join in, the lyrics are kept within the team as a means of keeping the team unified.

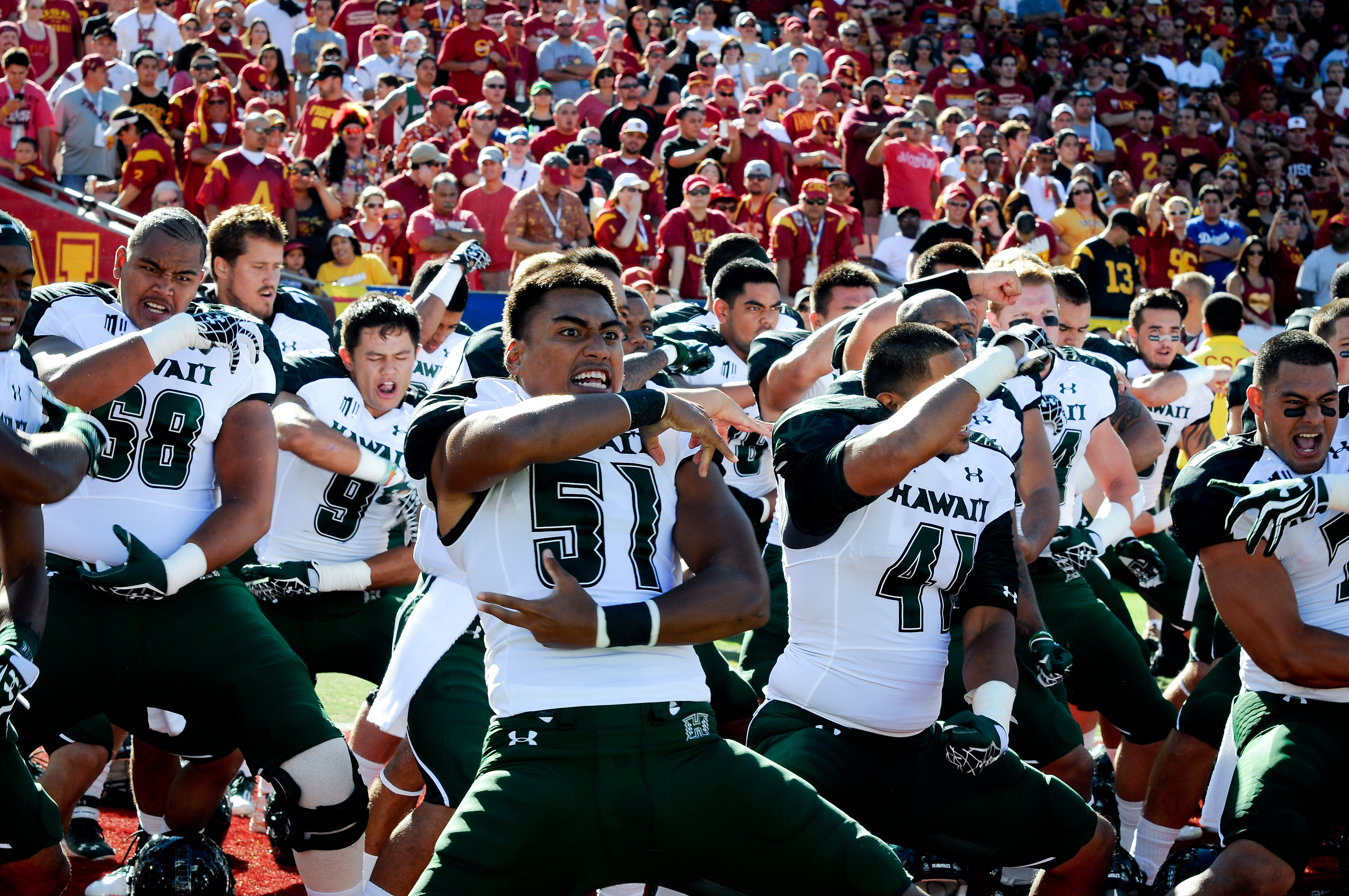
Hawaii players perform a dance before a 2012 game at Los Angeles Memorial Coliseum

Heading into the 2010 season, the team moved away from the haʻa, for unknown reasons, and began to perform the Māori "Tika Tonu" haka prior to games. At the start of the 2013 season, the team did not perform the haka live before home games (although it was still performed ahead of away games). Instead, a video of the team performing the haka was played on big screens at the Warriors' home stadium, before the team would make their entrance onto the field. However, by the end of the season, the Warriors had returned to performing the haka live before all games, both home and away.

== Trinity High School, Euless, Texas ==
Trinity High School of Euless, Texas, first performed the "Ka Mate" haka for fans at the beginning of the 2005 season, copying from the New Zealand's All Blacks rugby team. Several famous All Blacks such as Jonah Lomu, Doug Howlett, and Pita Alatini have been of Tongan birth or descent, and Tongan players have helped transform Trinity High School into a Texas football powerhouse. The Euless area is home to an estimated 4,000 people of Tongan descent.

"We do the haka to ignite the breath of competition. It means that I've got your back and you've got mine," noted 17-year-old Alex Kautai, a player who stands 6-foot (1.8 m) and weighs 280 pounds (127 kg), in 2006.

On 10 June 2008, former First Lady Laura Bush was greeted with a haka by the New Zealand Provincial Reconstruction Team in Bamyan Province, Afghanistan. She explained later in an interview that she was able to keep her cool because she is a fan of Texas football..."I actually know about the haka because there's one football team in Texas that won state last year that happens to have a lot of Tongans ... in Dallas-Fort Worth," she said. "And they do the haka. If I didn't already know about it and hadn't already seen this football team on television do this, I might have been really surprised by it."

== Jefferson High School, Portland, Oregon ==
Jefferson High School (Portland, Oregon) has performed the "Ka Mate" haka beginning in the 2007 season. As with some other schools, the haka was introduced by Tongan students, of which there were fewer than 20 at Jefferson. The school is predominantly African-American. "We are defending our land," said Tongan player Leni Feaomoeata, 15. "Jefferson has the reputation for losing, being dismissed. We wanted to defend our school, to show we have heart."

The team and school have embraced the haka despite opposition from other Oregon schools and sports administrators, who consider the haka intimidating. This has led to an ongoing controversy, and has resulted in imposed penalties on the school's team. Other coaches complained to Jefferson's athletic director, labelling the haka "scary" and the moves "gang signs..[the opposition]... left the team's staff exasperated and disappointed...The Oregon School Activities Association ultimately decided the ritual amounted to taunting and said the players must do the dance with their backs to the opposing team or face a 15-yard penalty at the start of each game." Opposition has not deterred the team, despite the penalties, and Jefferson has persevered with their new tradition. News of the controversy has spread even to New Zealand.

== Arizona Wildcats ==
From 2009 the University of Arizona Arizona Wildcats, which has a large number of Polynesian student-athletes, performed the "Ka Mate" haka, but this ceased in 2018 after being criticised as inappropriate and disrespectful.

== Munster Rugby ==
During a celebration match against the All Blacks on 18 November 2008 to commemorate the opening of their new stadium at Thomond Park, the Ka Mate haka was performed by four members of Irish provincial rugby team Munster. Former New Zealand Māori captain Rua Tipoki, former All Black Doug Howlett, former New Zealand sevens player Lifeimi Mafi and former Marlborough player Jerry Manning fronted the All Blacks, who replied with their own haka.

== Bethesda RFC ==
In Bethesda, Wales, on 20 December 2008, in an unlikely WRU Challenge Cup contest between Welsh Premiership side Cardiff RFC and Bethesda RFC of Division Six North, whose entire squad was drawn from Ysgol Dyffryn Ogwen the local Welsh medium comprehensive school, Bethesda's resident Māori, and club life member, Bill Huaki, performed a Welsh language version of the Haka. A motivated Bethesda went on to score three tries against Cardiff's nine, the game ending in a respectable 17–55 scoreline, with the slate quarrying village's amateurs earning much praise for their performance against the Welsh capital's professional team, which included internationals Craig Morgan and Lee Jarvis.

== 2023 FIFA Women's World Cup ==
During the 2023 FIFA Women's World Cup, the official social media accounts of two football associations – the Royal Spanish Football Federation (RFEF; Spain) and the Royal Dutch Football Association (KNVB; Netherlands) – uploaded videos of their training camps in New Zealand that each featured clips of players appearing to imitate haka, specifically the Ka Mate. The videos of the Spanish and Dutch players showed them "attempting" the haka and then laughing; both associations took down the videos. FIFA responded to questions about the videos by saying they would not comment; they had previously sent communications to teams about cultural respect while in Australia and New Zealand.

== Others ==
- Seaside High School Spartans football team, Seaside, California
- Menlo-Atherton High School, Atherton, California
- Long Beach Poly, Long Beach, California
- Birmingham High School, Los Angeles, California
- In Ville Platte, a small cajun-creole town in the bayou land of South Louisiana, two high school football teams, the predominantly black "Ville Platte High Bulldogs" and the all white "Sacred Heart Trojans" perform their own haka, the "Kajun Ka Mate", to each other before their annual meeting in the Tee Cotton Bowl as a sign of respect.
- Mesa High School, Mesa, Arizona. The varsity football team performs the haka at home football games, and also at sports assemblies.
- Kai Kara France, UFC. Kara-France performs a version of the Haka before many of his UFC fights.

== See also ==
- Cibi
- Cultural appropriation
- Kapa haka
- Kailao
