= Josh Rohatinsky =

American long-distance runner

Personal information
- Nationality: American
- Born: March 7, 1982 (age 44) Provo, Utah

Sport
- Sport: Track, Long-distance running
- Event(s): 1500 meters, 5000 meters, 10,000 meters, Marathon
- College team: BYU

Achievements and titles
- Personal best(s): 1500 meters: 3:46.59; 5000 meters: 13:25.53; 10,000 meters: 27:54.41; Marathon: 2:14:23

Josh Rohatinsky (born March 7, 1982 in Provo, Utah) is an American long-distance running athlete. He was the NCAA Men's Cross Country Champion in 2006 while running for BYU.

== Running career ==
=== High school ===
Josh's illustrious running career began in high school when he began to receive national attention for winning 4 state titles in cross country running as well as track and field. Josh finished at Provo High School in 2000 and then departed to serve a mission for The Church of Jesus Christ of Latter-day Saints. He competed in three consecutive Foot Locker Cross Country Championships with Provo High.

=== Collegiate ===
Rohatinsky enrolled at Brigham Young University after his missionary service. Josh graduated with his Master of Public Administration from BYU in 2012. He placed first at the 2007 NCAA Track and Field Championships in the 10,000 meters. He also won the individual race at the 2006 NCAA Division I Cross Country Championships.

=== Post-collegiate ===
After college, Rohatinsky was coached by Alberto Salazar and then Jerry Schumacher. In November 2007 Rohatinsky ran his debut marathon in a time of 2:15:22, placing 9th in the US Olympic Trials for the Marathon. Having not qualified to be the United States' representative in the marathon at the 2008 Summer Olympics, Rohatinsky ran the Olympic Trials for the 10,000 meters in July 2008, but finished in fifth place behind to the likes of Galen Rupp, Jorge Torres, and Abdi Abdirahman. He stopped running competitively after 2010.
