= Brian Santiago =

American college sports administrator

Current position
- Title: Athletic director
- Team: BYU
- Conference: Big 12

Biographical details
- Education: Utah Valley University (AS); Fresno State University (BS); Brigham Young University (MBA)

Playing career

Basketball
- 1992–1994: Fresno State

Administrative career (AD unless noted)
- 2008–2017: BYU (senior associate AD)
- 2017–2025: BYU (deputy AD)
- 2025–present: BYU

Brian Santiago is an American college athletics administrator and former college basketball player. He is the athletic director at Brigham Young University, a position he has held since 2025. Santiago played college basketball for Fresno State University.

== Early life and education ==
Santiago graduated in 1988 from Provo High School in Provo, Utah, where he was an all-state player on the 1987 state championship basketball team. He played both basketball and baseball at Utah Valley University, earning All-Conference and All-Region honors in both sports. He then transferred to Fresno State, where he led the Western Athletic Conference in assists and three-point shooting percentage, finishing second nationally in three-point percentage at 50%.

After college, he played professionally for three years with the Arecibo Capitanes in Puerto Rico's Superior Basketball League and was named to the Puerto Rico national team’s pre-selection Olympic roster.

Santiago earned an A.S. in accounting from Utah Valley University, a B.S. in business administration with an emphasis in international business from Fresno State University in 1995, and an MBA from BYU's Marriott School of Management in 2001.

== Career ==
Santiago joined BYU's athletic department in 1997 as a member of the men's basketball coaching staff under head coach Steve Cleveland. In 2001, he transitioned into an administrative role. He was promoted to senior associate athletic director in 2008 and later served as deputy athletic director beginning in 2017.

In May 2025, Santiago was appointed as the university's new athletic director, succeeding Tom Holmoe. His appointment followed a national search led by BYU president C. Shane Reese, who reportedly interviewed over 50 candidates.

On August 27, 2026, BYU announced that Santiago was removed from the chain of command for BYU football, with the BYU head football coach, Kalani Sitake, reporting directly to a university vice president instead of Santiago. This followed several weeks of reported friction between Santiago and Sitake.

== Personal life ==
Santiago served a mission for The Church of Jesus Christ of Latter-day Saints in the Dominican Republic. He is married to the former Kimberly Blackburn.
