= The Cougar Song =

Fight song of Brigham Young University

"The Cougar Song," often colloquially referred to as "The Cougar Fight Song," "The BYU Fight Song," or "Rise and Shout, The Cougars Are Out," is the school fight song of Brigham Young University. It is often played at BYU sporting events, especially at BYU football games. On these occasions it is traditional for the fans to remain seated, singing along with the verse, then stand for the chorus and chant—giving literal meaning to the phrase "rise and shout."

== History ==
The song was composed by Clyde D. Sandgren, a 1932 BYU graduate. Clyde later served at BYU as general counsel, a vice president, and for four years as the Alumni Association president. He died in 1989 and left ownership of the song to his son, Clyde D. Sandgren, Jr. (Dee). Only Dee and BYU have the rights to the song.

In 1947, Clyde Sandgren registered The Cougar Song with the U.S. Copyright Office, and renewed the work's copyright registration in 1975. The song was dedicated by its composer especially "To all BYU students who so valiantly served their country in World War II."

The Cougar Song is not the only college song BYU has had in its history. In 1899 Annie Pike Greenwood wrote "The College Song," which for many years stood as the school's main song until The Cougar Song was written. Even afterwards, the song was still sung at alumni and other functions.

The lyrics, as sung at BYU events, were altered from the original version sometime in the 1990s due to pressure from women's groups on BYU campus. The lyric "stalwart men and true" was changed to "Loyal, strong, and true."
