= Val Hale =

American journalist and sports director (born 1957)

Val Hale (born 1957) is an American journalist and sports director. In 2014, he was appointed by Utah Governor Gary R. Herbert as executive director of the Governor's Office of Economic Development (GOED), and is currently serving in this role promoting state growth in business, tourism and film.

Hale was raised in Orem, Utah graduating from Orem High School. He attended BYU where he received his bachelor's degree (Public Relations, 1981) and his master's degree (Communications, 1987). He worked as a reporter (1981–82) and sports columnist (2005–06) and business columnist (2012–14) for the Provo Daily Herald. He later worked at BYU in marketing, fundraising, media relations and later as men's Athletic Director of BYU from 1999 to 2004. From 2002 to 2004, he served on the NCAA Men's Golf Committee and as chair of that committee in 2003–04.

After he left BYU in 2004, he became Assistant Vice President of External Affairs at Utah Valley State College (now Utah Valley University) (UVU) until 2006. He went on to serve at UVU as vice president, Advancement (2006–10) and Vice President, University Relations (2010–12). From 2012 to 2014, he served as president and CEO of the Utah Valley Chamber of Commerce. In August 2014, he was appointed in his current role as executive director, GOED.

== Sources ==
- Deseret News, July 18, 2005
- UVU profile page for Hale
- New York Times article mentioning Hale
