= Cosmo the Cougar =

Mascot for Brigham Young University

Cosmo
- University: Brigham Young University
- Conference: Big 12 Conference
- Description: Anthropomorphic cougar
- Origin of name: BYU’s mascot got its name after BYU was named a “cosmopolitan” school in 1953.
- First seen: October 15, 1953
- Website: cosmocougar.com

Cosmo is the official mascot of Brigham Young University's (BYU) athletic teams. He can be seen at almost all sporting events, wearing the uniform of the team that is playing. In the past, Cosmo's job was a volunteer position, and no scholarship or academic assistance was given. However, scholarships and other benefits are offered today. The mascot is expected to be involved in civic events and university functions. He is also the brother of Cosmo Cougar Junior, Cooper Cougar, Corbin Cougar, Cosmabelle Cougar, and Charlotte Cougar.

Cosmo was named the Mascot "National Champion" in the SXM College's Twitter poll in April 2020.

== History of Cosmo ==
=== Before the costume ===
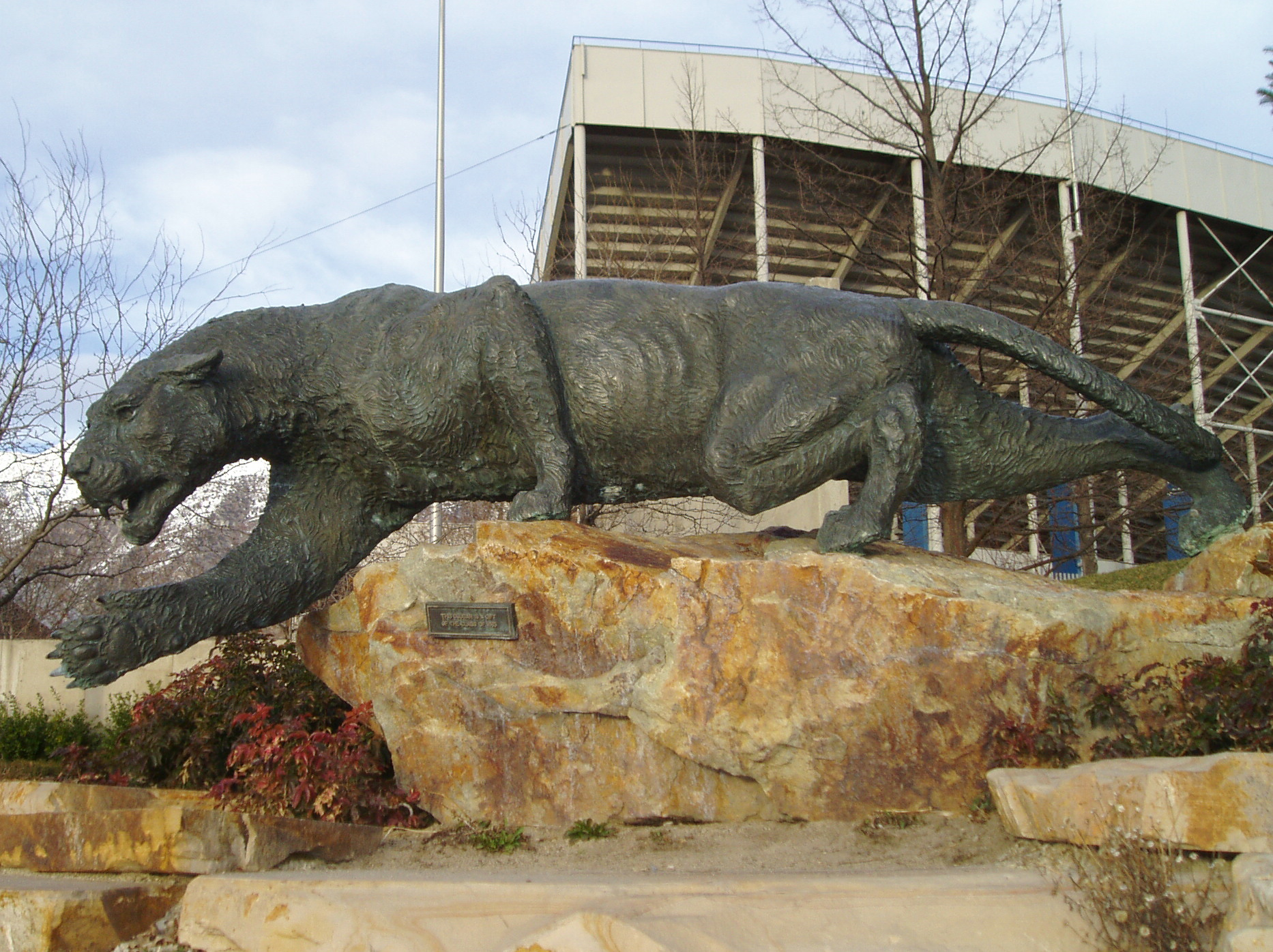
This cougar statue was donated by the class of 1965 and stands outside LaVell Edwards Stadium.

=== Cosmo comes to life ===
On October 15, 1953, Cosmo made his first appearance in front of BYU fans. Dwayne Stevenson, the pep chairman of BYU, bought the costume for $73 and persuaded his roommate Daniel T. Gallego to wear it and thus become the first Cosmo. The name Cosmo derives from the word "cosmopolitan" and was chosen because BYU had recently been selected as a Cosmopolitan school. Cosmo became immediately popular, and since Gallego many people have been Cosmo, including BYU president Ernest L. Wilkinson, who once put on the costume at a pep rally. LaVell Edwards, the legendary football coach for the Cougars, wore the Cosmo costume during the final season basketball game against Utah in 1981.

=== Cosmo undergoes cosmetic surgery ===
On September 2, 1997, BYU's Athletic Media Relations announced that while hunting Swoop the Hawk (rival) Utah's mascot in Rock Canyon, Cosmo fell 100 feet. Several students saw the fall, however, and called Utah Valley Search and Rescue, which performed emergency surgery on Cosmo. This included reduction in head size, which allowed Cosmo more range of motion and the ability to perform more daring stunts. Cosmo frequently does flips, walks on stilts, rides motorcycles, and performs slam dunks in order to please the crowd. It was remarked once on ESPN that Cosmo was "probably the most athletic mascot in college basketball."

=== Cosmo today ===
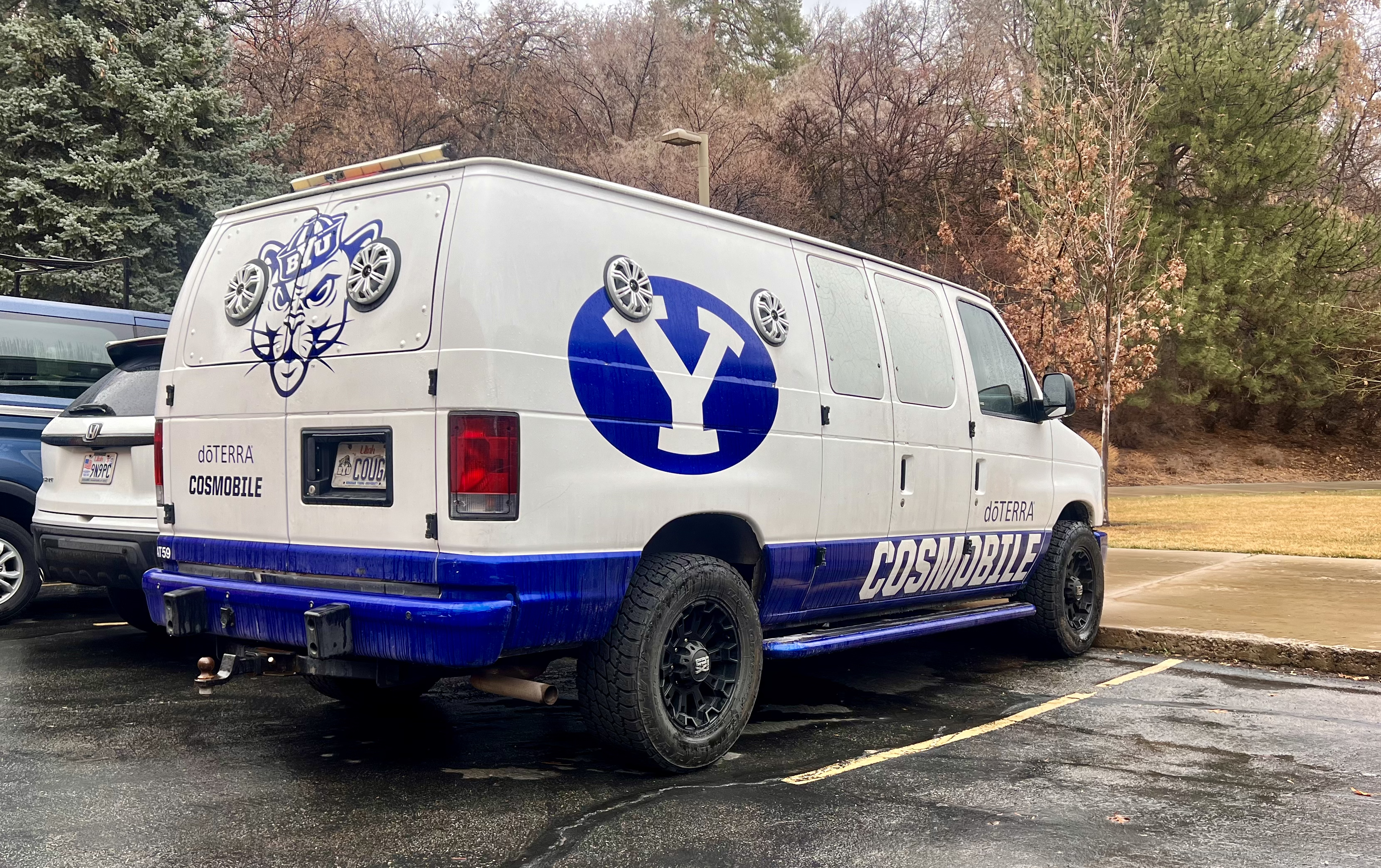
This van includes a 1600-watt, 12-speaker stereo system, a dance stage on top, a basketball hoop, a variety of specialty lights (on the top), a fog machine, several sirens, and a cordless public address system.

Cosmo's workload of performances at more than 450 functions a year necessitates that there be more than one Cosmo at a time. A team of people, Team Cosmo, helps him with his antics. He drives around in the Cosmobile, a van retrofitted for Cosmo's active lifestyle, and also owns a go-cart. In 2020, Cosmo won the Sirius XM Mascot Bracket Championship and was named National Champion of Mascots.

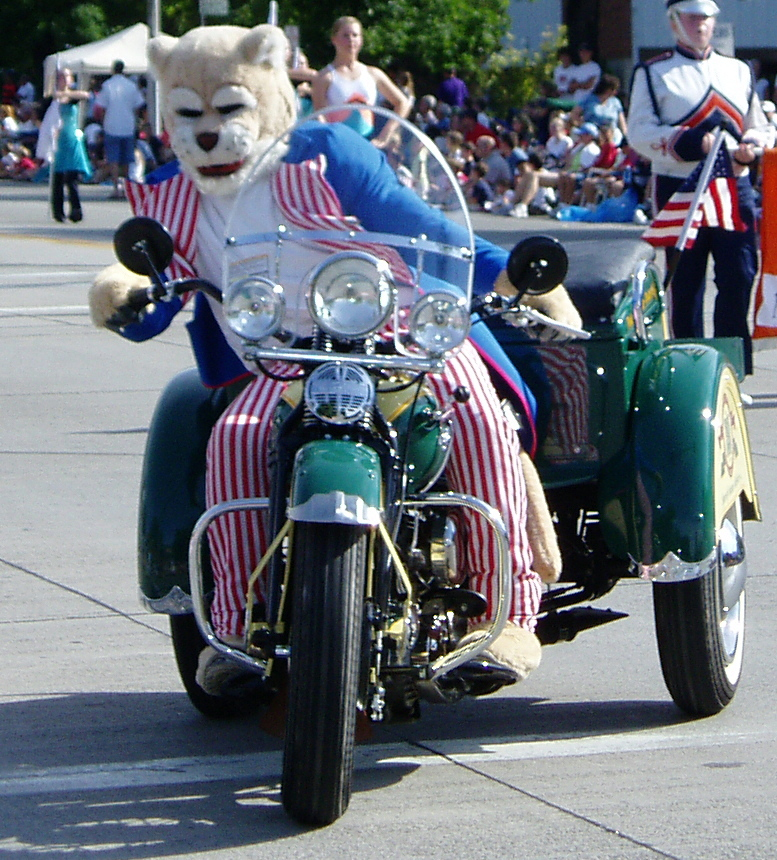
Cosmo at the 2006 Fourth of July parade in Provo

== In popular culture ==
In 2012 Cosmo has been the subject of a series of short films, "Cosmo Begins," and "Cosmo: Reloaded," which have been displayed between the third and fourth quarters at home football games. He also participated in the Capital One Mascot Bowl and was featured on several commercials that showed on national television.

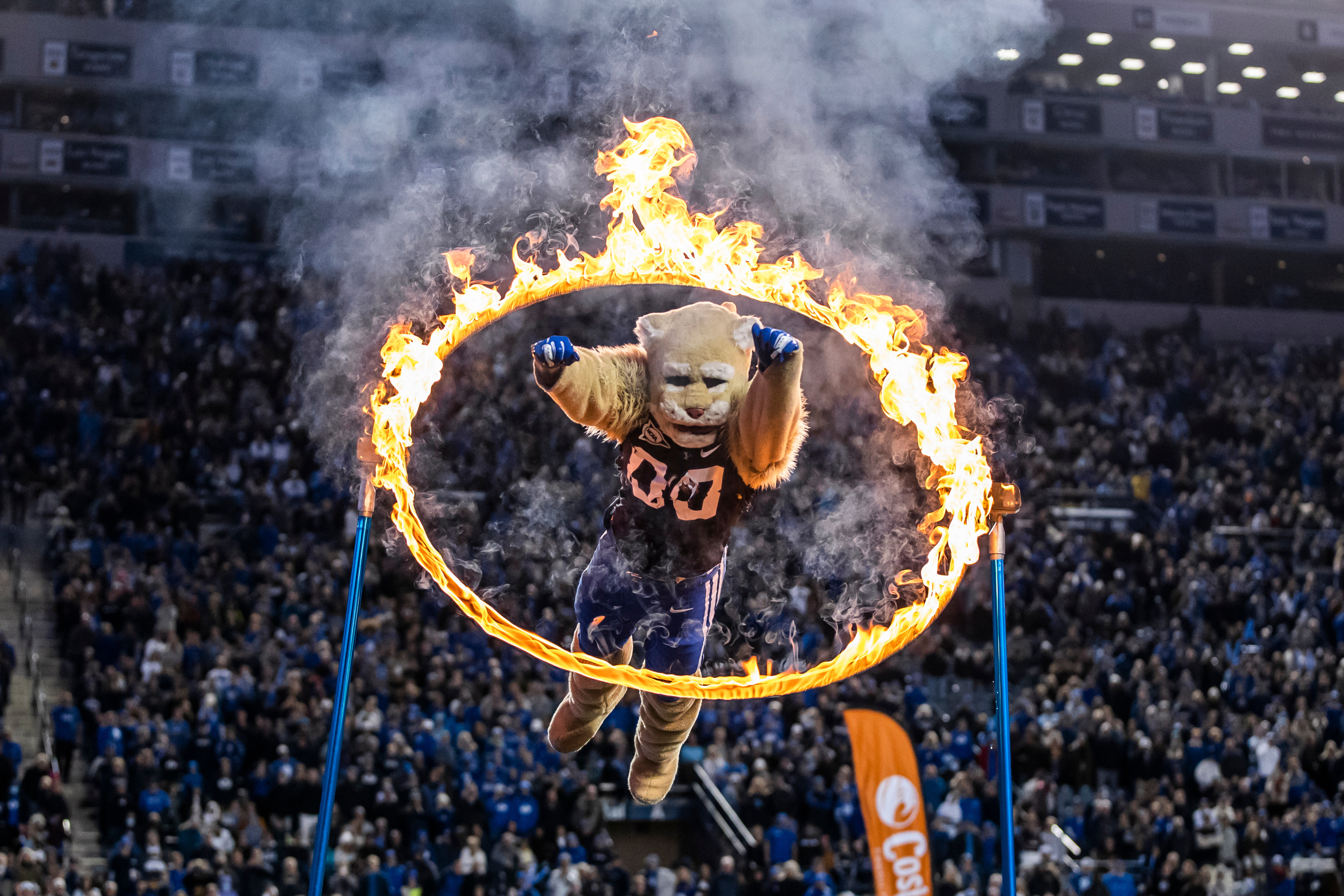
Cosmo performs another one of his stunts at a BYU Football game: BYU vs Virginia

== Past Cosmos ==
Over 70 people have been Cosmo over the years, including:

- Daniel T. Gallego, 1953–54
- Clive Moon, 1954–55
- Ray Pope, 1955–56
- Peggy Herron Mortensen, 1955–56
- Daniel T. Gallego, 1959–60
- Roy Spradley, 1960–61
- Buddy Youngreen, 1961–62
- Albert Leonard Kemp Jr, 1969 (as needed, Student Body VP)
- John Bennion, 1971–72
- Michael T. Dowling, 1976–77
- Jim Daly, 1977–78
- Brian Larney, 1981
- Bruce Grode, 1981–82
- Dave Wright, 1982–83
- Scott Bateman, 1985–86
- David Broach, 1987–88
- Paul Thorley, 1988–89
- Bret Pope, 1989–90
- Jerry Kearns, 1990–91
- Michael Porter, 1990–91
- G. Craig Randall, 1990–92
- Richard Dee Lalliss, 1990–92
- Brent Hales, 1992–93
- Gary R. Arbuckle Jr., 1993–94
- Cameron K. Mylroie, 1994–95
- Aaron G. McGavock, 1999–2001
- Rich Summers, 2001–2004
- Devin Nelson, 2002–2005
- C. Ryan Osorio, 2004–05
- Justin Leavitt 2005–2008
- Andrew Syndergaard 2005–2009
- Joe Roberts 2007–2012
- Chris Sullivan 2008–2010
- Stephen Jones ca. 2010
- Kyle Ellison, 2008–2011
- Josh Drean, 2008–2011
- Matt McClure, 2012–2015
- Charlie Bird, 2015–2018
- Grant Taylor, 2016–2020
- Stephan Millard, 2017–2020

== See also ==
- List of U.S. college mascots
