= Texas Longhorns =

Intercollegiate sports teams of the University of Texas at Austin

- University: University of Texas at Austin
- Nickname: Longhorns
- NCAA: Division I (FBS)
- Conference: SEC
- Athletic director: Chris Del Conte
- Location: Austin, Texas, United States
- Varsity teams: 21
- Football stadium: Darrell K Royal–Texas Memorial Stadium
- Basketball arena: Moody Center
- Baseball stadium: Disch-Falk Field
- Softball stadium: Red and Charline McCombs Field
- Soccer stadium: Mike A. Myers Stadium
- Natatorium: Lee and Joe Jamail Texas Swimming Center
- Rowing venue: Texas Rowing Center
- Tennis venue: Texas Tennis Center
- Outdoor track and field venue: Mike A. Myers Stadium
- Volleyball arena: Gregory Gymnasium
- Colors: Burnt orange and white
- Mascot: Bevo and Hook 'em
- Fight song: Texas Fight
- Website: texaslonghorns.com
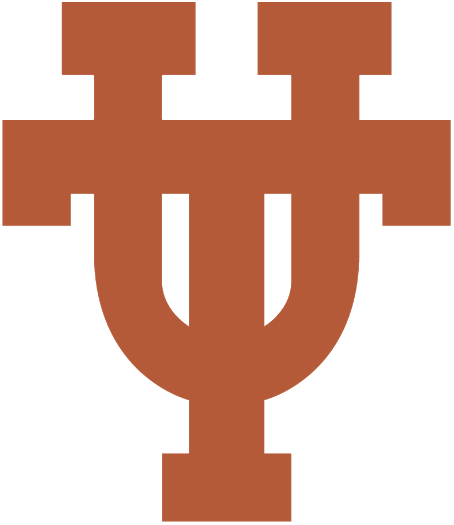

SEC logo in Texas colors

The Texas Longhorns are the athletic teams representing the University of Texas at Austin, a public university in Austin, Texas, United States, and the flagship institution of the University of Texas System.

The teams take their name from Longhorn cattle that were an important part of the development of Texas, and are now the official "large animal" of the state of Texas. The Longhorn nickname had begun appearing in Texas newspapers by 1900, and is often shortened to the Horns. Generally, both the men's and women's teams are referred to as the Longhorns. The mascot is a Texas Longhorn steer named Bevo. The Longhorns have consistently been ranked as the biggest brand in collegiate athletics, in both department size and breadth of appeal.

The University of Texas at Austin offers a wide variety of varsity and intramural sports programs, and was selected as "America's Best Sports College" in a 2002 analysis by Sports Illustrated. Texas was also listed as the number one Collegiate Licensing Company client from 2005 to 2013 in regards to the amount of annual trademark royalties received from the sales of its fan merchandise.

Until Athletic Director Chris Del Conte altered the organizational structure of the athletic department in 2017, Texas was the only remaining NCAA Division I school to operate separate men's and women's athletic departments, after the other remaining holdout, the University of Tennessee, merged its men's and women's athletic departments at the end of the 2011–12 academic year.

== Varsity sports ==
Men's sports	Women's sports
Baseball	Basketball
Basketball	Beach volleyball
Cross country	Cross country
Football	Golf
Golf	Rowing
Swimming & diving	Soccer
Tennis	Softball
Track and field^{†}	Swimming & diving
	Tennis
	Track and field^{†}
	Volleyball
† – Track and field includes both indoor and outdoor.

A charter member of the Southwest Conference until its dissolution in 1996, the Texas Longhorns competed in the Big 12 Conference until 2024. The Texas Longhorns joined the Southeastern Conference for the 2024–2025 season with the University of Oklahoma for a reported $100 million, as a member of the National Collegiate Athletic Association. The school's colors are officially Orange (Pantone 159) and White, with Burnt Orange — also known as Texas Orange – being the specific shade of orange used. The University of Texas Longhorn Band performs the alma mater as well as the university fight song ("Texas Fight") at various sporting events.

Over the years, Longhorn sports teams have won 56 total national championships, 47 of which are NCAA National Championships. The University of Texas currently fields a varsity team in nine men's sports and 12 women's sports.

In 1992, seven women athletes representing club-level rowing, soccer and gymnastics and intramural softball, organized by the rowing club coach, sued the university in U.S. District Court charging them with Title IX violations. At the time there were more men on the football team than there were varsity-level women athletes. In July 1993 Texas settled the lawsuit, agreeing to add women's rowing, soccer and softball; and agreeing to devote more than 44 percent of its varsity athletic roster spots and more than 42 percent of its athletic scholarship money to women. Women's soccer was added in 1993, softball in 1995 and rowing in 1997.

=== Football ===
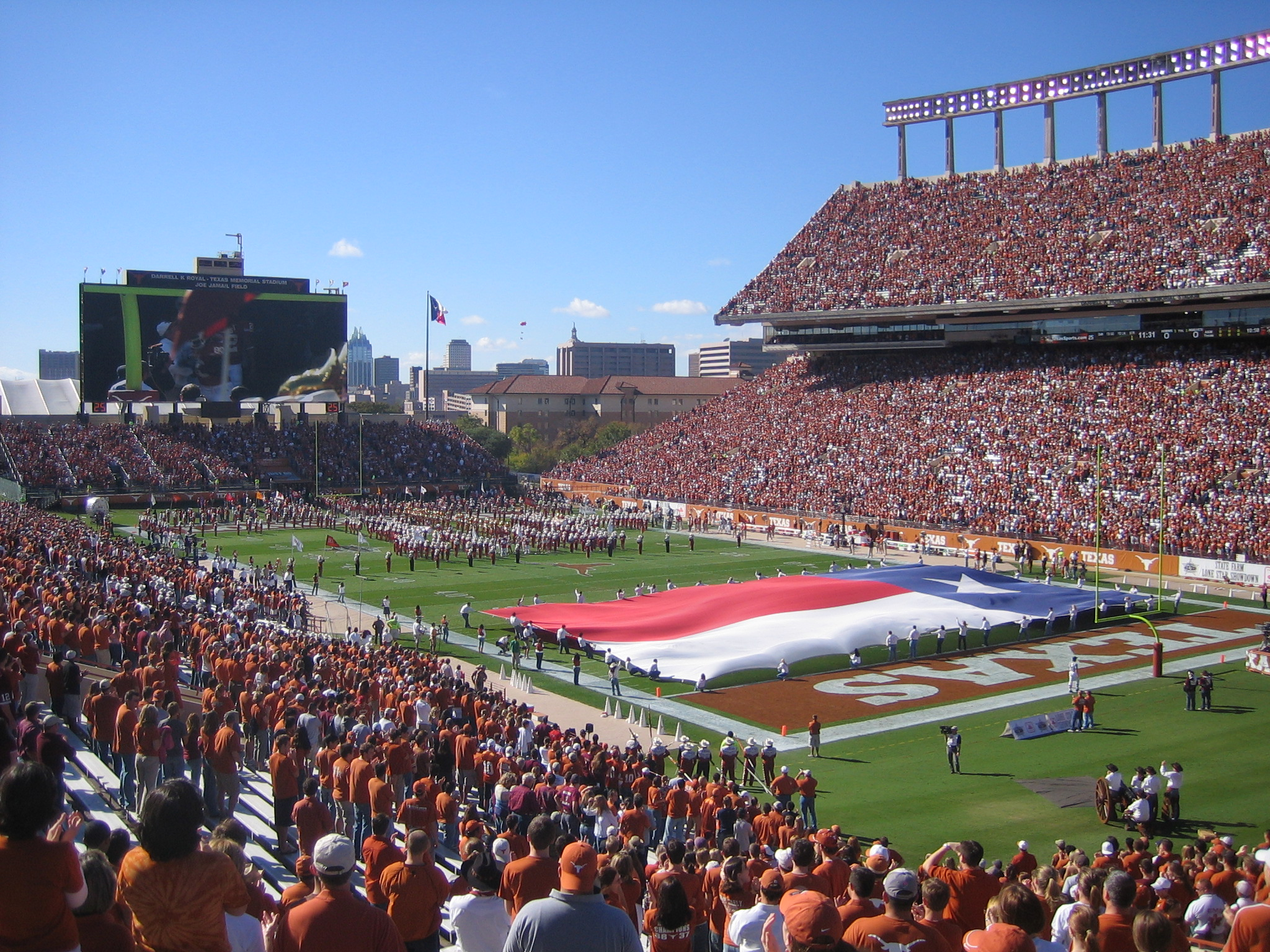
Darrell K Royal–Texas Memorial Stadium with a view of the Godzillatron

Two Texas Longhorn running backs have won college football's most prestigious individual award, the Heisman Trophy: Earl Campbell (1977) and Ricky Williams (1998). Seventeen Longhorn players and two Longhorn coaches have been inducted into the College Football Hall of Fame, while four are enshrined in the Pro Football Hall of Fame. Other Longhorn players have also received recognition for their performance.

In terms of total wins, Texas is the 2nd-ranked NCAA Division I FBS program in college football history with 891 wins, after passing Nebraska during the 2016 season. As of the end of the 2016 season, the Longhorns' all-time record is 891–359–33 (.709). Only the University of Michigan has won more games and a greater percentage of games played than Texas, which recorded its 800th victory with the Longhorns' 41–38 win over the USC Trojans in the 2006 BCS National Championship Game at the Rose Bowl. During the late 1980s and early 1990s, the program was somewhat less successful, but the Longhorns have since returned to prominence in college football, finishing in the top six of the AP and coaches' polls in 2001, 2002, 2004, 2005, 2008 and 2009.

The University of Texas team plays home games in Darrell K Royal-Texas Memorial Stadium which has a seating capacity of 100,119. Renovations began on the stadium November 14, 2005, two days following the last home football game of the 2005 season. The improvements were completed before the 2008 football season, and included additional seating and the nation's first high definition video display in a collegiate facility nicknamed "Godzillatron". The university completed a $27 million expansion and renovation to the south end zone facilities in August 2009 which added 4,525 permanent bleacher seats and changed the playing surface to FieldTurf. With the new permanent bleacher seating section added behind the south end zone and the total remodeling of the north end zone completed in 2008, the stadium's official capacity now stands at 100,119. This was surpassed when 101,357 saw #3-ranked Texas beat Kansas 51–20 on November 21, 2009.

==== Championships and bowls ====
- National championships (4 claimed; 5 unclaimed):

- Claimed (AP and Coaches Poll): 1963, 1969, 1970, 2005
- Unclaimed (other): 1914, 1941, 1968, 1977, 1981

- Conference championships (33):

1913, 1914, 1916, 1918, 1920, 1928, 1930, 1942, 1943, 1945, 1950, 1952, 1953*, 1959*, 1961*, 1962, 1963, 1968*, 1969, 1970, 1971, 1972, 1973, 1975*, 1977, 1983, 1990, 1994*, 1995, 1996, 2005, 2009, 2023

- Divisional championships (7):

1996, 1999, 2001, 2002, 2005, 2008, 2009

- Bowl game wins (31):

Major bowl games:
BCS National Championship Game – 2005
Rose Bowl – 2005, 2006
Sugar Bowl – 1948, 2019
Fiesta Bowl – 2009
Cotton Bowl – 1943, 1946, 1953, 1962, 1964, 1969, 1970, 1973, 1982
Orange Bowl – 1949, 1965
Peach Bowl - 2025
Second-tier bowl games:
Cotton Bowl – 1999, 2003
Alamo Bowl – 2006, 2012, 2019, 2020
Bluebonnet Bowl – 1966, 1975, 1987
Holiday Bowl – 2001, 2007, 2011
Sun Bowl – 1978, 1994
Texas Bowl – 2017

=== Men's basketball ===
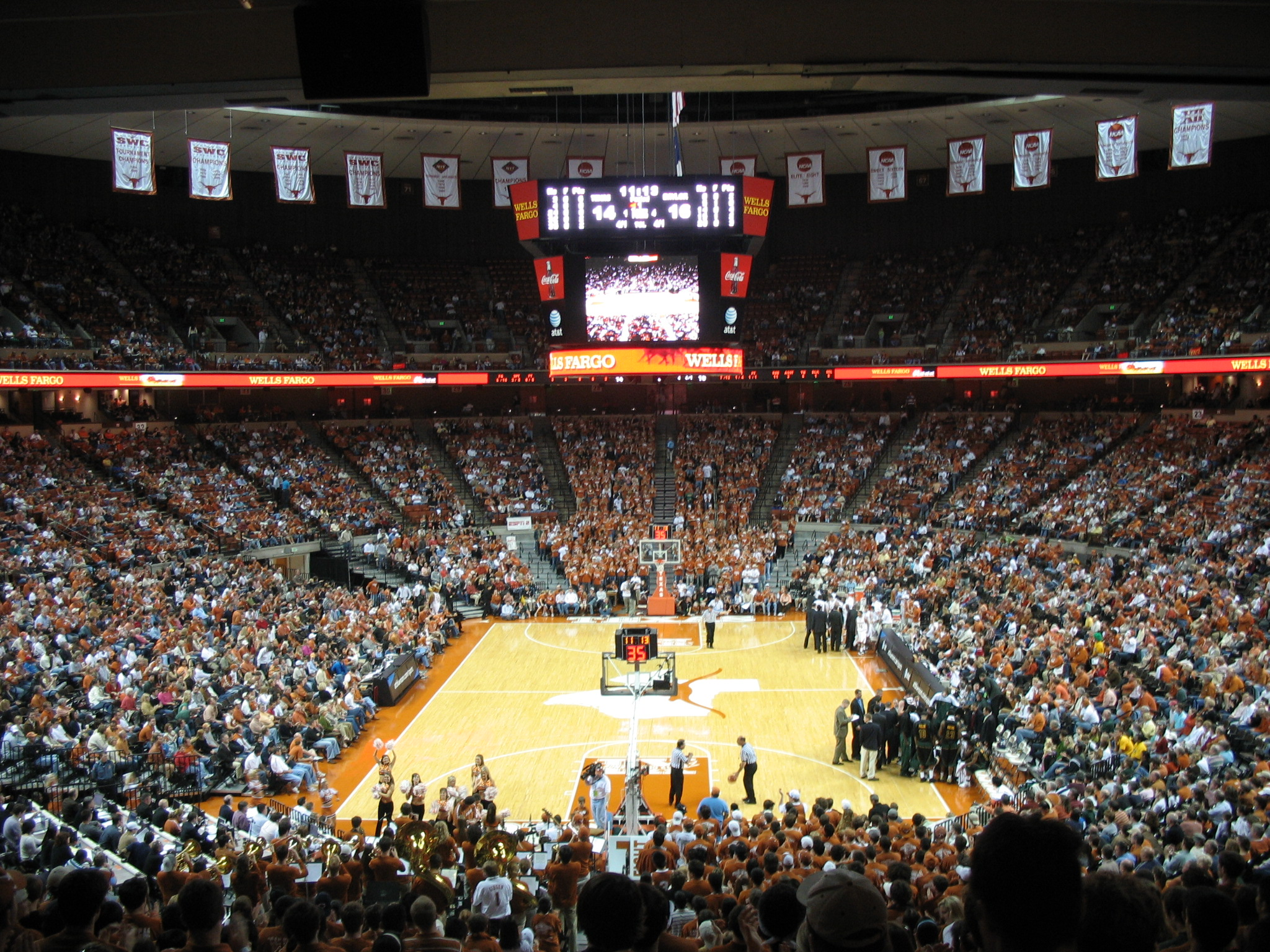
The Frank Erwin Center during a Texas basketball game

The University of Texas began varsity intercollegiate competition in men's basketball in 1906. The Longhorns rank 18th in total victories among all NCAA Division I college basketball programs and 25th in all-time win percentage among programs with at least 60 years in Division I, with an all-time win–loss record of 1791–1088 (.622). Among Big 12 Conference men's basketball programs, Texas is second only to Kansas in both all-time wins and all-time win percentage.

The Longhorns have won 27 total conference championships in men's basketball and have made 34 total appearances in the NCAA tournament (11th-most appearances all time, with a 35–37 overall record), reaching the NCAA Final Four three times (1943, 1947, 2003) and the NCAA regional finals (Elite Eight) seven times. As of the end of the 2017–18 season, Texas ranks sixth among all Division I men's basketball programs for total NCAA Tournament games won without having won the national championship (35), trailing Kansas State (37), Notre Dame (38), Purdue (39), Illinois (40), and Oklahoma (41). The Longhorns have also won 2 NIT championships, in 1978 and 2019.

Texas's best season was arguably the 1932–33 season when the team went 22–1 and won the Southwest Conference. In 1995, the Premo-Porretta Power Poll retroactively named this team as a national champion; however, the NCAA does not recognize Premo-Porretta, and the university does not claim a national championship. Since the introduction of the AP poll, Texas's best season was 2002-2003 when it went 26–7, earned a #1 seed in the NCAA tournament, made it as far as the Final Four and finished the season ranked #3 in the AP poll.

The 2005–06 season marked the 100th anniversary of basketball at the University of Texas. Special logos were placed on the uniforms to commemorate this anniversary.

In 2007, the men's basketball team was ranked sixth by the Harris Poll for favorite men's college basketball teams, moving up one spot from the previous year.

==== Championships ====
- NIT championships (2)

1978, 2019

- Conference championships (25):

1915, 1916, 1917, 1919, 1924, 1933, 1939, 1943, 1947, 1951, 1954, 1960, 1963, 1965, 1972, 1974, 1978, 1979, 1986, 1992, 1994, 1995, 1999, 2006, 2008

- Conference tournament championships (3):

1994, 1995, 2021, 2023

=== Women's basketball ===
The women's basketball team has long been a national power, especially during the late 1980s (winning a national title in 1986) and through the 1990s. Both teams play home games in the Moody Center. The adjacent Denton A. Cooley Pavilion serves as the training and practice facility for both the men's and women's teams.

==== Championships ====
- National championship (1):

1986

- Conference championships (13):

1983, 1984, 1985, 1986, 1987, 1988, 1989, 1990, 1993, 1996, 2003, 2004, 2023

- Conference tournament championships (12):

1983, 1984, 1985, 1986, 1987, 1988, 1989, 1990, 1994, 2003, 2022, 2024

=== Baseball ===
The Texas Longhorns are the winningest team in college baseball history, both in terms of total wins and in terms of win percentage. Texas holds the records for most appearances in the College World Series (35) and most individual CWS games won. The Longhorns have won six NCAA baseball national championships (1949, 1950, 1975, 1983, 2002, and 2005) — second only to Southern California's total of 12 – and have appeared in the CWS Championship Game or Championship Series on six other occasions (1953, 1984, 1985, 1989, 2004, and 2009).

Former Longhorns who have gone on to success in Major League Baseball include Roger Clemens, Bibb Falk, Ron Gardenhire, Calvin Schiraldi, Burt Hooton, Keith Moreland, Spike Owen, Greg Swindell, Huston Street, Omar Quintanilla, Taylor Teagarden, Sam LeCure and Drew Stubbs.

From 1997 to 2016, the Longhorns were led by head coach Augie Garrido, the winningest coach in NCAA baseball history. The team plays its home games at Disch-Falk Field.

==== Championships ====
- National championships (6):

1949, 1950, 1975, 1983, 2002, 2005

- Conference regular-season championships (80):

1899, 1905, 1907, 1908, 1913, 1914, 1915, 1916, 1917, 1918, 1919, 1920, 1921, 1922, 1924, 1925, 1926, 1927, 1928, 1929, 1930, 1932, 1935, 1936, 1938, 1939, 1940, 1941, 1943, 1945, 1946, 1947, 1948, 1949, 1950, 1951, 1952, 1953, 1954, 1957, 1958, 1960, 1961, 1962, 1963, 1965, 1966, 1967, 1968, 1969, 1970, 1971, 1972, 1973, 1974, 1975, 1976, 1979, 1980, 1981, 1982, 1983, 1984, 1985, 1986, 1987, 1988, 1991, 1992, 1996, 2002, 2004, 2006, 2007, 2009, 2010, 2011, 2018, 2021, 2023

- Conference tournament championships (16):

1979, 1980, 1981, 1982, 1983, 1984, 1987, 1988, 1990, 1991, 1994, 2002, 2003, 2008, 2009, 2015

=== Softball ===
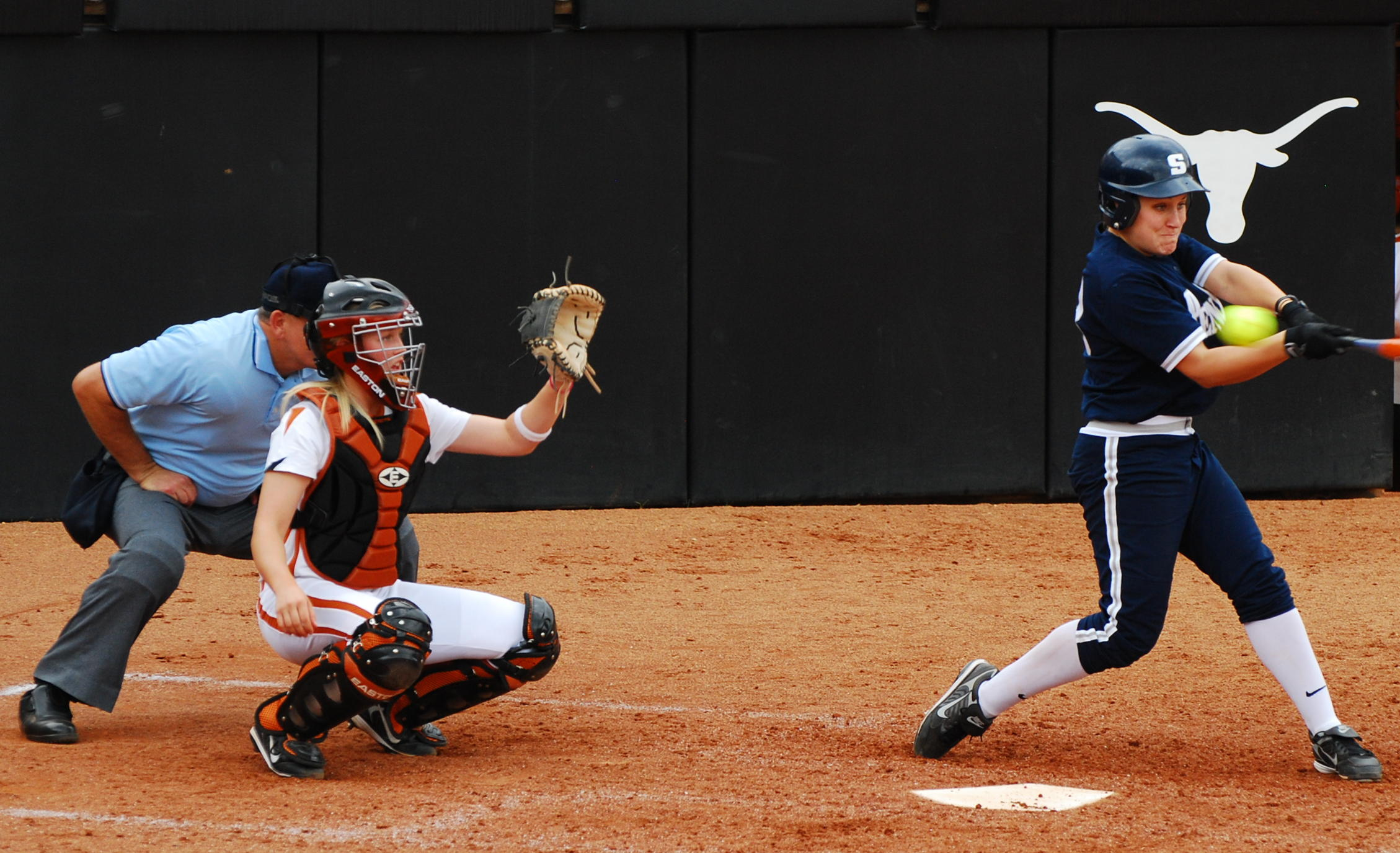
The Longhorns softball team gets the final strikeout to win over Penn State, February 15, 2008

The University of Texas Longhorn's softball team was founded in 1995 as part of its 1993 Title IX settlement. It is currently led by head coach Mike White and assistant coaches Kerry Shaw and Chelsea Spencer. Texas has made 20 total appearances in the NCAA Tournament in 23 seasons of varsity competition, reaching the Women's College World Series (WCWS) five times (1998, 2003, 2005, 2006, 2013) and finishing as high as 3rd on three occasions (2003, 2005 and 2013).

==== UT's Louisville Slugger/NFCA All-Americans ====
Player	Position	Year(s)
Cat Osterman	Pitcher	2002, 2003, 2005, 2006
Blaire Luna	Pitcher	2010, 2011
Nikki Cockrell	Second Base	1998, 1999
Autumn Estes	Outfield	1999
Lindsay Gardner	Second base	2000
Jodi Reeves	Shortstop	1998
Christa Williams	Pitcher	1997, 1998, 1999

==== Championships ====
- National championship (2):

2025, 2026

- Conference championships (5):

2002, 2003, 2006, 2010, 2024

- Conference tournament championships (4):

1999, 2002, 2003, 2005

=== Men's golf ===
The University of Texas has a strong golf tradition, dating back to their first season in 1927. Since then they have won national titles back-to-back in 1971 and 1972 and again in 2012, and finished runner-up six other times (1949, 1983, 1989, 1994, 2016, 2019). Individual national champions were Ed White (1935), Ben Crenshaw (1971, 1972, and 1973), Tom Kite (1972), and Justin Leonard (1994). Longhorns who have won the U.S. Amateur include Justin Leonard and David Gossett. Two-time U.S. Junior Amateur champion and three-time major winner Jordan Spieth played for the Longhorns golf team in 2011 and 2012. In 2022, Longhorn alum Scottie Scheffler won the Masters Tournament and reached World No.1 in the Official World Golf Ranking in March 2022. Besides Majors-winners Kite, Crenshaw, Leonard and Spieth, a number of other former Longhorn players have gone on to win on the PGA Tour, including: Phil Blackmar, Mark Brooks, Jhonattan Vegas, Bob Estes, Wes Ellis, Harrison Frazar, Cody Gribble, Rik Massengale, Wes Short Jr., and Brandel Chamblee. In addition, Longhorns Brandon Stone and Dylan Frittelli have each achieved multiple wins on the European Tour.

Legendary golf instructor Harvey Penick was a long-time coach at Texas. The team is currently coached by John Fields.

==== Championships ====
- National championships (4):

1971, 1972, 2012, 2022

- Conference championships (48):

1927, 1928, 1932, 1933, 1934, 1935, 1936, 1937, 1938, 1940, 1941, 1942, 1943, 1944, 1945, 1946, 1947, 1948, 1950, 1951, 1952, 1954, 1964, 1965, 1968, 1970, 1972, 1973, 1974, 1975, 1981, 1983, 1989, 1990, 1991, 1992, 1993, 1994, 1995, 2002, 2003, 2004, 2013, 2014, 2015, 2016, 2017, 2024

=== Women's golf ===
The women's golf team has been to the NCAA Championship 27 times, tied for 7th overall and finished as the runner-up, or tied for runner-up, twice, in 1993 and 2002. As of 2019, they have finished in the top 5 eight times, most recently in 2019 (t-5th) and 2003 (3rd). In 2019 Texas won its first NCAA Regional in school history and was the stroke play medalist at the NCAA Championship.

Texas women have won three individual championships. In 1978 Deborah Petrizzi won the AIAW national intercollegiate individual golf championship; and Charlotta Sörenstam and Heather Bowie won in 1993 and 1997 respectively. Former players Betsy Rawls and Sherri Steinhauer went on to win 8 and 2 LPGA major championships respectively, with Rawls being inducted into the World Golf Hall of Fame.

==== Championships ====
- Conference championships (18):

1984, 1987, 1988, 1989, 1990, 1991, 1993, 1994, 1995, 1996, 1997, 2004, 2011, 2017, 2018, 2019, 2022, 2024

=== Men's tennis ===
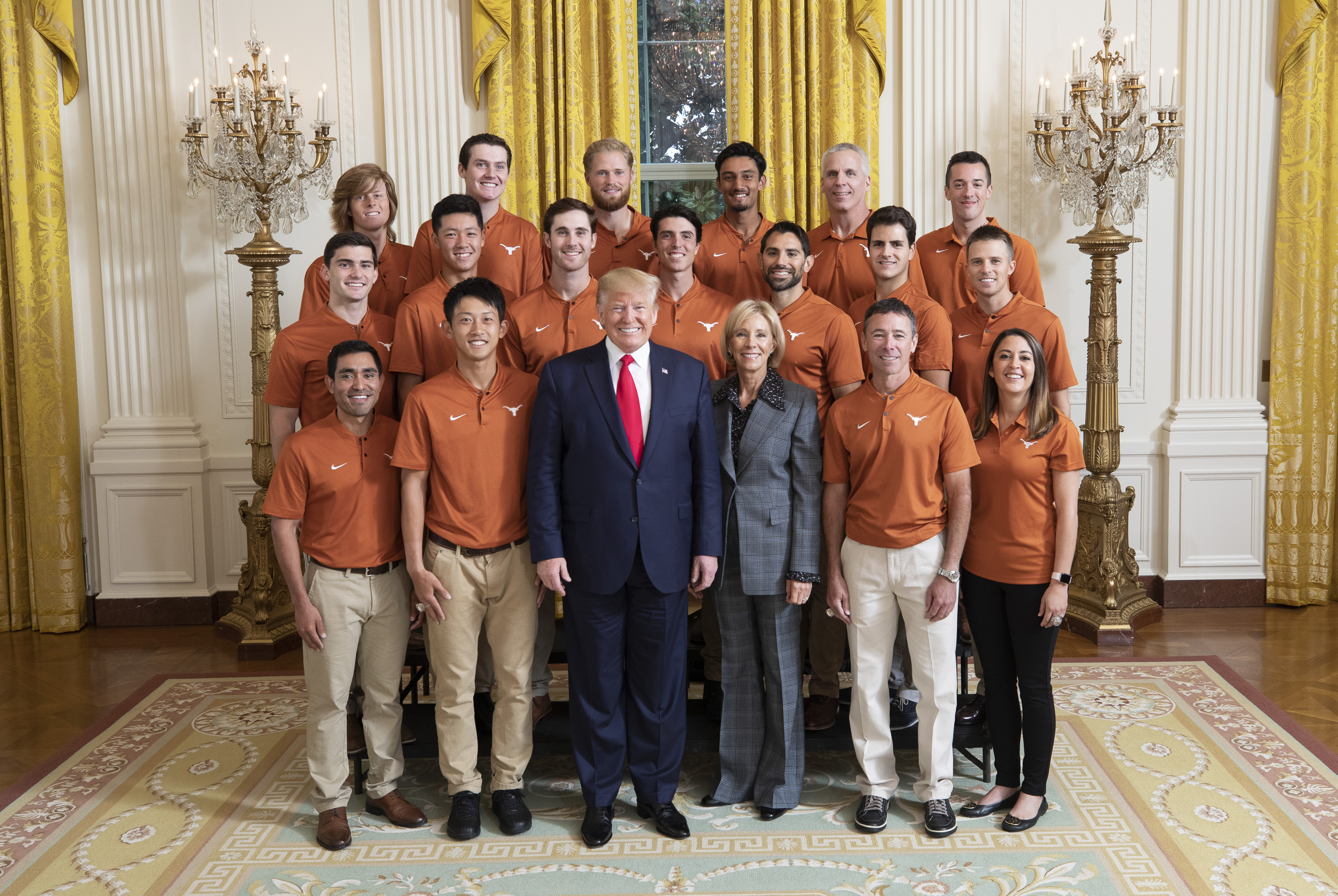
The tennis champions of 2019 with President Donald Trump at the White House

Tennis was played at The University of Texas as early as 1884, although it was not until 1909 that intercollegiate competition developed. Between that time and the advent of the Southwest Conference in 1915, Texas and Oklahoma annually held a meet for the championship of the Southwest. The first season of Texas Men's Tennis was in 1912. Since forming, the Men's Tennis team has won 17 Southwest Conference Championships, 5 Big 12 Championships and the 2019 NCAA Championship. Texas teams have reached the NCAA Championship semifinals five times (1993, 2006, 2008, 2009 and 2019) and prior to the formation of the tournament when the final standings were determined by a poll, the Longhorns finished fourth or better five times, including 1946 (4th), 1952 (tie 4th), 1955 (2nd), 1957 (3rd), and 1960 (tie 4th).

In March 2019 tennis head coach Michael Center was arrested and charged with conspiracy to commit mail fraud as part of the 2019 college admissions bribery scandal.

Despite losing their head coach to scandal just two months earlier, the Texas Men's Tennis team won its first ever NCAA tennis championship over Wake Forest in May 2019.

==== Championships ====
- National championship (1):

2019

- Conference championships (29):

1915, 1948, 1949, 1950, 1951, 1952, 1953, 1954, 1955, 1956, 1957, 1961, 1963, 1967, 1977, 1990, 1993, 1994, 1995, 1997, 1998, 1999, 2006, 2008, 2010, 2014, 2019, 2021, 2023

- Conference tournament championships (7):

1990, 1993, 1997, 1999, 2006, 2010, 2018

=== Women's tennis ===
The women's Longhorns tennis team began play in 1978, and since then has won 4 NCAA Championships (1993, 1995, 2021, 2022), 23 regular-season conference titles (three shared), 12 Big 12 tournaments and all 9 SWC tournament championships. They were also the NCAA runner-up in 1992 and 2005.

==== Championships ====
- National championships (4):

1993, 1995, 2021, 2022

- Conference championships (23):

1983, 1984, 1985, 1987, 1988*, 1989, 1990, 1992, 1993, 1994, 1995, 1996, 1997, 1998, 1999, 2000, 2001, 2002, 2004, 2007, 2018, 2019, 2021

- Conference tournament championships (21):

1988, 1989, 1990, 1991, 1992, 1993, 1994, 1995, 1996, 1997, 1998, 1999, 2000, 2001, 2002, 2005, 2012, 2013, 2018, 2021, 2022

=== Men's track and field ===
The men's program is coached by Edrick Floréal. The Longhorns were runners-up in the outdoor championships in 1987, 1988, and 1997 but have never won a title. Other notable coaches of the Texas men's program have included Bubba Thornton, who also coached the 2008 US Olympic team, Stan Huntsman (1986–95), who also coached the 1988 US Olympic team, and Clyde Littlefield (Texas coach, 1920–60), the 1925 co-founder of the annual Texas Relays. The men won four consecutive Big 12 Indoor Championships between 2006 and 2009. The men have won 41 individual titles, 10th most of all schools.

The Longhorn track and field programs have produced numerous Olympians for various nations. Male medalists include Ryan Crouser (United States, gold, shot put; 2016, 2020, 2024), Leonel Manzano (United States, silver, 1500 meters, 2012), Winthrop Graham (Jamaica, silver, 400m hurdles, 1992 and 4 × 400 m relay, 1988), Patrick Sang (Kenya, silver, 3000m steeplechase, 1992), Du'aine Ladejo (Great Britain, bronze, 4 × 400 m relay, 1992), Lam Jones (USA, gold, 4 × 100 m relay, 1976), Eddie Southern (USA, silver, 400m hurdles, 1956), and Dean Smith (sprinter) (USA, gold, 4 × 100 m relay, 1952).

==== Championships ====
- Indoor conference championships (15):

1974, 1975, 1992, 1993, 1994, 1999, 2006, 2007*, 2008, 2009, 2013, 2015, 2017, 2021, 2022

- Outdoor conference championships (55):

1915, 1916, 1920, 1923, 1924, 1925, 1926, 1927, 1932, 1933, 1934, 1935, 1936, 1937, 1940, 1941, 1942, 1944, 1945, 1946, 1950, 1954, 1955, 1956, 1957, 1958, 1959, 1961, 1966, 1968, 1969, 1972, 1973, 1974, 1975, 1976, 1977, 1979, 1986, 1987, 1992, 1993, 1994, 1995, 1996, 1997, 1999, 2003, 2006, 2013, 2015, 2016, 2017, 2021, 2022

=== Women's track and field ===
The women's program is coached by Edrick Floréal. Other notable coaches have included Beverly Kearney, who guided the Lady Longhorns to six NCAA Championships: Indoor Championships in 1998, 1999, and 2006, and Outdoor Championships in 1998, 1999, and 2005; and Terry Crawford, whose teams won Indoor Championships in 1986, 1988, and 1990, and Outdoor Championships in 1982 and 1986. Crawford's athletes also won the 1986 Women's Cross Country Championship. The program's first title was the 1982 AIAW outdoor track and field championship.

The Longhorn track and field programs have produced numerous Olympians for various nations. Female Olympic medalists have included Michelle Carter (athlete) (USA, gold, shot put, 2016), Sanya Richards-Ross (2012: USA, gold, 400 meters and 4 x 400 meter relay; 2008, bronze, 400 meters and gold, 4 x 400 meter relay, 2008), Moushami Robinson (USA, gold, 4 × 400 meter relay, 2004), Sandie Richards (Jamaica, silver, 4 × 400 m relay, 2000 and 2004), Merlene Frazer (Jamaica, silver, 4 × 100 m relay, 2000), Nanceen Perry (USA, bronze, 4 × 100 m relay, 2000), Carlette Guidry (USA, gold, 4 × 100 m relay, 1992 and 1996), Juliet Cuthbert (Jamaica, silver, 100m and 200m, 1992 and bronze, 4 × 100 m relay, 1996), and Nikole Mitchell (Jamaica, bronze, 4 × 100 m relay, 1996).

Courtney Okolo became the first Longhorn to win The Bowerman, an award that honors collegiate track & field's most outstanding athlete of the year. In 2016, she became the first female collegian to run sub-50 seconds in the 400 meters, in turn lowering her own collegiate record to 49.71. Her senior season also included an undefeated record against collegians and four NCAA titles (two individual, two relay).

==== Championships ====
- Indoor National Championships (6):

1986, 1988, 1990, 1998, 1999, 2006

- Outdoor National Championships (6):

1982 (AIAW), 1986, 1998, 1999, 2005, 2023

- Indoor Conference Championships (23):

1985, 1986, 1987, 1988, 1989, 1990, 1991, 1992, 1993, 1994, 1995, 1996, 1998, 1999, 2002, 2003, 2006, 2014, 2015, 2016, 2018, 2019, 2020

- Outdoor Conference Championships (22):

1985, 1986, 1987, 1988, 1989, 1991, 1992, 1993, 1994, 1995, 1996, 1997, 1998, 1999, 2003, 2004, 2006, 2012, 2014, 2015, 2016, 2019

=== Men's cross country ===
The men's cross country team has 33 Southwest Conference championships and has placed as high as 3rd in the NCAA Men's Division I Cross Country Championship.

The 1956 individual championship was won by Walter McNew with a time of 19:55.94.

==== Championships ====
- Conference Championships (33)

1920, 1923, 1924, 1930, 1931, 1932, 1933, 1934, 1935, 1936, 1937, 1938, 1939, 1940, 1941, 1942, 1943, 1944, 1945, 1946, 1947, 1954, 1955, 1960, 1963, 1964, 1965, 1967, 1969, 1972, 1973, 1991, 1993

=== Women's cross country ===
The women's cross country team has 4 Southwest Conference championships and won the 1986 NCAA Cross Country Championship.

==== Championships ====
- National Championships (1)

1986

- Conference Championships (4)

1985, 1986, 1987, 1989

=== Volleyball ===
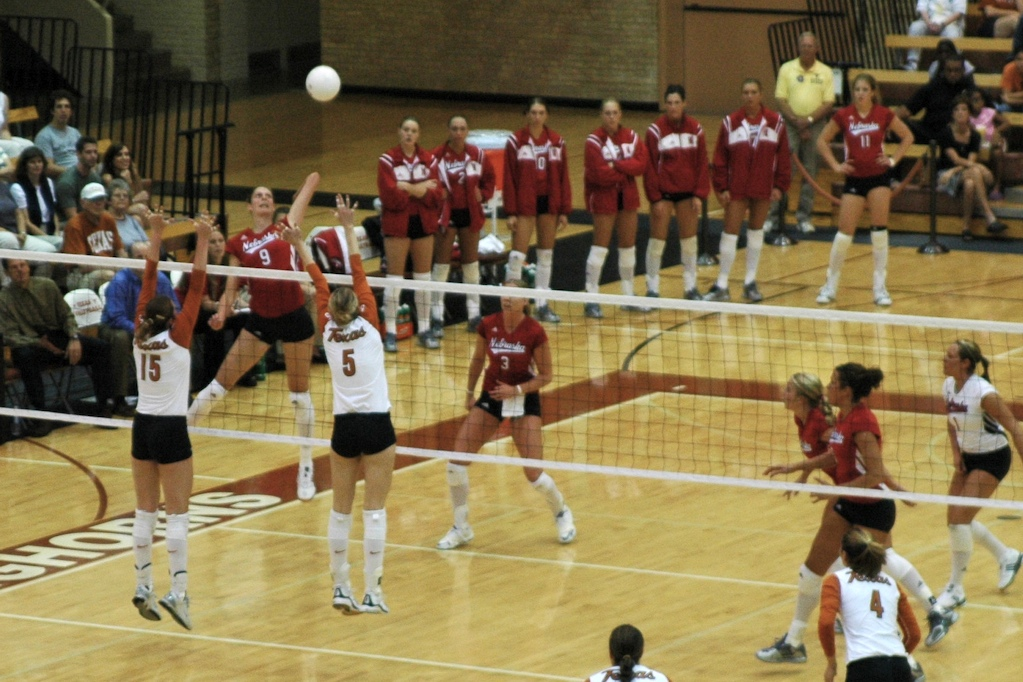
Texas v Nebraska game in 2004

Texas won the 1988, 2012, 2022, and 2023 NCAA National Championships, with runner-up finishes in 1995, 2009, 2015, 2016 and 2020. They also won an AIAW national championship in 1981. The team is currently coached by Jerritt Elliott and plays home games in Gregory Gymnasium.

Texas won the Big 12 Conference in 1997, 2007, 2008, 2009, 2011, 2012, 2013, 2014, 2015, 2017, 2018, 2019, 2020, 2021, 2022 and 2023. They finished 2nd in 1996, 1998, 2004, 2005, 2010, and 2016. They finished 3rd in 1999 and 2006. They have qualified for every NCAA tournament since 2004 and advanced to at least the Regional Finals since 2006.

Texas volleyball has produced many All-Americans, and in 2007, they won the program's first Big 12 title since 1997, sharing the title with Nebraska. Texas broke Nebraska's three-year streak of winning the title outright. They also earned the programs first AVCA National Freshman of the Year since 1995 in 2007, for Big 12 Freshman of the Year Juliann Faucette, and Logan Eggleston won the program's first ever AVCA National Player of the Year award in 2022.

==== Championships ====
- National Championship (5):

1981 (AIAW), 1988, 2012, 2022, 2023

- Conference Championships (29):

1982, 1983, 1984, 1985, 1986, 1987, 1988, 1989, 1990, 1991, 1992, 1993, 1995, 1997, 2007*, 2008*, 2009, 2011, 2012, 2013, 2014, 2015, 2017, 2018, 2019, 2020, 2021, 2022, 2023

=== Swimming and diving ===
Texas has won sixteen national titles in men's swimming and diving (1981, 1988–1991, 1996, 2000–2002, 2010, 2015–18, 2021, 2025) and nine in women's swimming and diving (1981–82, 1984–88, 1990–91), making swimming and diving the most successful Texas athletics program by far, based on number of national titles. The women's swimming team is currently coached by Carol Capitani, and the men's and women's diving teams are coached by Matt Scoggin. The men's swimming team has been coached by Eddie Reese since 1978. In 2021, Reese retired after 43 years as the Texas men's head coach. When a successful replacement was not named, Reese returned to the Head Coach position. Reese has coached numerous former and current world record holders while at Texas, including many competing in the Summer Olympic Games for the United States and other home nations. The swim team was first developed under Coach Tex Robertson.

==== Men's championships ====
- National Championships (16):

1981, 1988, 1989, 1990, 1991, 1996, 2000, 2001, 2002, 2010, 2015, 2016, 2017, 2018, 2021, 2025

- Conference Championships (63):

1932, 1933, 1934, 1935, 1936, 1937, 1938, 1939, 1940, 1941, 1942, 1943, 1944*, 1946, 1947, 1948, 1949, 1950, 1951, 1952, 1955, 1980, 1981, 1982, 1983, 1984, 1985, 1986, 1987, 1988, 1989, 1990, 1991, 1992, 1993, 1994, 1995, 1996, 1997, 1998, 1999, 2000, 2001, 2002, 2003, 2004, 2005, 2006, 2007, 2008, 2009, 2010, 2011, 2012, 2013, 2014, 2015, 2016, 2017, 2018, 2019, 2020, 2021

==== Women's championships ====
- National Championships (9):

1981, 1982, 1984, 1985, 1986, 1987, 1988, 1990, 1991

- Conference Championships (33):

1983, 1984, 1985, 1986, 1987, 1988, 1989, 1990, 1991, 1992, 1993, 1994, 1995, 1996, 1999, 2000, 2001, 2002, 2003, 2004, 2005, 2006, 2009, 2011, 2013, 2014, 2015, 2016, 2017, 2018, 2019, 2020, 2021

=== Women's rowing ===
The women's rowing team was established in the fall of 1998 as the result of the 1993 Title IX settlement. At the team's first appearance at the NCAA championships in 2003, its varsity 8 placed 12th nationally. The team won the inaugural Big 12 Championship in 2009 and kept the championship title for the following three years. Additionally, the Texas women's rowing team won the 2011 Conference USA Championship. In June 2014, Dave O'Neill was appointed head coach of the program. Under his coaching, the women's rowing team placed fourth in the 2017 NCAA Championship, third in 2018, second in 2019, and first in 2021, marking the program's best four finishes.

- National Championships (3):

2021, 2022, 2024

- Conference Championships (10):

2009, 2010, 2011, 2012, 2015, 2016, 2017, 2018, 2019, 2021, 2022

=== Soccer ===
The Texas women's soccer program was established in 1993 as part of that year's Title IX settlement. Since then they have won 3 conference championships - one regular season and two tournaments — and been to 13 NCAA tournaments, making it as far as the Sweet Sixteen in 2004, 2006, 2007 and 2017. In 2006 the Longhorns finished ranked #8 in the nation, their highest end-of-season ranking ever.

==== Championships ====
- Conference championships (1):

2001

- Conference Regular Season championships (1):

2022

- Conference tournament championships (2):

2006, 2007

== Non-varsity sports ==
=== Rugby ===
Founded in 1985, the Texas Longhorns rugby team plays in the Allied Rugby Conference, and plays its postseason in the Varsity Cup Championship. The Longhorns rugby program has been improving in recent years. Texas rugby has instituted a combine to identify the most elite athletes on campus with an eye towards recruiting them to play rugby. The increasing popularity of rugby in the United States and the announcement that rugby would return to the Summer Olympics led Texas to upgrade the designation of its rugby program from club to Olympic. The Texas Rugby Alumni association and the Texas Exes have begun an endowment to award scholarships to Texas rugby players, which is viewed as a vital recruitment tool.

The Longhorns' improvement led to Texas winning the Southwest Conference in the 2011–12 season to qualify for the sweet sixteen of the 2012 national championship playoffs. Texas won the 2012 Southwest 7s tournament to qualify for the 2012 USA Rugby Sevens Collegiate National Championships.

The Longhorns rugby program has been boosted by its participation in the Collegiate Rugby Championship, the highest profile college rugby competition in the US, which is broadcast live on NBC. In the 2011 CRC, Texas defeated Big 12 rival Oklahoma to reach the quarterfinals. Following Texas's participation in the 2011 CRC, Texas "raised an additional $10,000 from alumni, landed a new apparel sponsor, and have been contacted by 90 students (including two DBs from the football team) who want to play rugby." In the 2012 CRC, Texas defeated its rival Oklahoma to again reach the quarterfinals of the tournament.

The Longhorns rugby program reached a new all-time high during the 2013–2014 season. Texas won the 2013 Southwest Conference 7s Championship advancing them to the 2013 USA Rugby Sevens Collegiate National Championships, where they finished ranked #12 in the nation. Months later Texas won the 2014 Southwest Conference 15s Championship, making them the first team in the conference to win both the 7s and 15s championships in the same season. The Longhorns finished the season with their first participation in The Varsity Cup Championship, where they finished in the top 8.

	Gold	Silver	Bronze
2008	10	2	2
2004	9	4	6
2000	9	9	2
1996	7	2	3
1992	5	3	3
1988	5	4	1
1984	5	1	0
1980	0	1	0
1976	2	0	0
1968	1	0	0
1960	1	0	0
1956	1	1	0
1952	2	0	0
1948	1	0	0
Total	68	31	18

== Halls of honor ==
- University of Texas Men's Athletics Hall of Honor
- University of Texas Women's Athletics Hall of Honor

== Championships ==
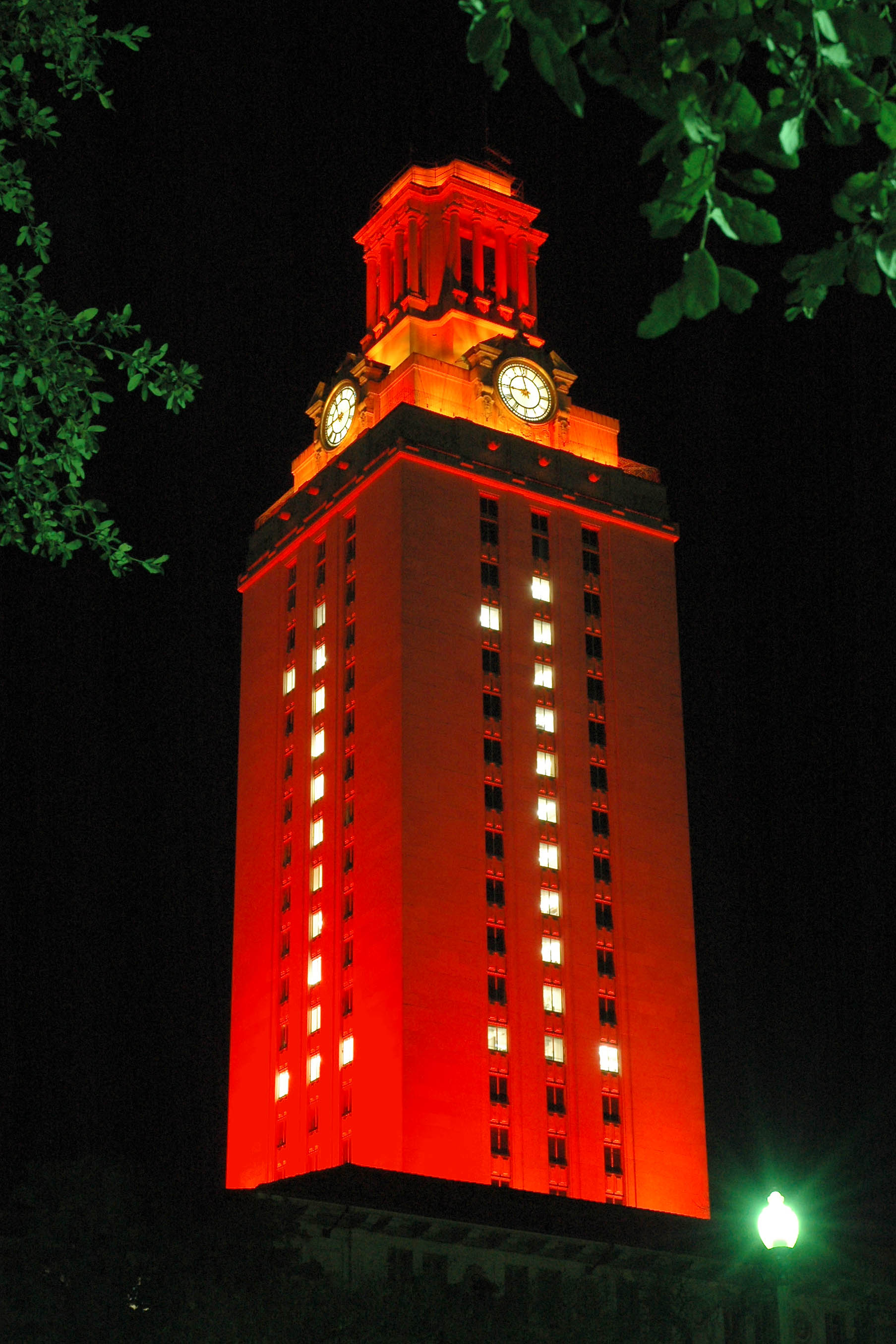
The Tower lit in a special configuration in honor of a national championship team

=== NCAA team championships ===
Texas has won 62 NCAA team national championships.

- Men's (28)
  - Baseball (6): 1949, 1950, 1975, 1983, 2002, 2005
  - Golf (4): 1971, 1972, 2012, 2022
  - Indoor Track & Field (1): 2022
  - Swimming (17): 1981, 1988, 1989, 1990, 1991, 1996, 2000, 2001, 2002, 2010, 2015, 2016, 2017, 2018, 2021, 2025, 2026
  - Tennis (1): 2019
- Women's (34)
  - Basketball (1): 1986
  - Cross country (1): 1986
  - Indoor Track & Field (6): 1986, 1988, 1990, 1998, 1999, 2006
  - Outdoor Track & Field (5): 1986, 1998, 1999, 2005, 2023
  - Rowing (4): 2021, 2022, 2024, 2026
  - Softball (2): 2025, 2026
  - Swimming (7): 1984, 1985, 1986, 1987, 1988, 1990, 1991
  - Tennis (4): 1993, 1995, 2021, 2022
  - Volleyball (4): 1988, 2012, 2022, 2023
- See also:
  - Big 12 Conference national team titles
  - List of NCAA schools with the most NCAA Division I championships

=== Other national team championships ===
Below are 10 national team titles that were not bestowed by the NCAA.

- Men's (5)
  - Football (4): 1963, 1969, 1970, 2005
  - Indoor tennis (1): 2026
- Women's (5)
  - Outdoor Track & Field (1): 1982 (AIAW)
  - Swimming and Diving (2): 1981, 1982 (AIAW)
  - Volleyball (1): 1981 (AIAW)
  - Beach volleyball (1): 2008 (AVCA)
- See also:
  - List of NCAA schools with the most Division I national championships

=== Conference championships ===
Baseball (80 regular season titles; 16 tournament titles)
- Regular season: 1899, 1905, 1907, 1908, 1913, 1914, 1915, 1916, 1917, 1918, 1919, 1920, 1921, 1922, 1924, 1925, 1926, 1927, 1928, 1929, 1930, 1932, 1935, 1936, 1938, 1939, 1940, 1941, 1943*, 1945, 1946, 1947, 1948, 1949, 1950, 1951*, 1952, 1953*, 1954, 1957, 1958, 1960, 1961, 1962, 1963*, 1965, 1966*, 1967*, 1968, 1969, 1970, 1971, 1972*, 1973, 1974, 1975, 1976, 1979, 1980, 1981, 1982, 1983, 1984, 1985, 1986*, 1987, 1988, 1991, 1992, 1996, 2002, 2004, 2006, 2007, 2009, 2010, 2011, 2018, 2021, 2023
- Tournament: 1979, 1980, 1981, 1982, 1983, 1984, 1987, 1988, 1990, 1991, 1994, 2002, 2003, 2008, 2009, 2015
Basketball (25 regular season titles; 4 tournament titles)
- Regular season: 1915, 1916, 1917, 1919, 1924, 1933, 1939, 1943*, 1947, 1951*, 1954*, 1960, 1963, 1965*, 1972*, 1974, 1978*, 1979*, 1986*, 1992*, 1994, 1995*, 1999, 2006*, 2008*
- Tournament: 1994, 1995, 2021, 2023
Men's Cross Country (33)
- 1920, 1923, 1924, 1930, 1931, 1932, 1933*, 1934, 1935, 1936, 1937, 1938, 1939, 1940, 1941, 1942, 1943, 1944, 1945, 1946, 1947, 1954, 1955, 1960, 1963, 1964, 1965, 1967, 1969, 1972, 1973, 1991, 1993, 1994*
Fencing (5)
- 1942, 1943, 1947, 1948, 1949 (discontinued in 1957)
Football (33)
- 1913, 1914, 1916, 1918, 1920, 1928, 1930, 1942, 1943, 1945, 1950, 1952, 1953*, 1959*, 1961*, 1962, 1963, 1968*, 1969, 1970, 1971, 1972, 1973, 1975*, 1977, 1983, 1990, 1994*, 1995, 1996, 2005, 2009, 2023
Men's Golf (48)
- 1927, 1928, 1932, 1933, 1934, 1935, 1936, 1937, 1938, 1940, 1941, 1942, 1943, 1944, 1945, 1946, 1947, 1949, 1950, 1951, 1952, 1954, 1964, 1965, 1968, 1970, 1972, 1973, 1974*, 1975*, 1981, 1983, 1989, 1990, 1991, 1992, 1993, 1994, 1995, 2002, 2003, 2004, 2013, 2014, 2015, 2016, 2017, 2024
Men's Swimming & Diving (66)
- 1932, 1933, 1934, 1935, 1936, 1937, 1938, 1939, 1940, 1941, 1942, 1943, 1944*, 1946, 1947, 1948, 1949, 1950, 1951, 1952, 1955, 1980, 1981, 1982, 1983, 1984, 1985, 1986, 1987, 1988, 1989, 1990, 1991, 1992, 1993, 1994, 1995, 1996, 1997, 1998, 1999, 2000, 2001, 2002, 2003, 2004, 2005, 2006, 2007, 2008, 2009, 2010, 2011, 2012, 2013, 2014, 2015, 2016, 2017, 2018, 2019, 2020, 2021, 2022, 2023, 2024
Men's Tennis (30 regular season titles; 8 tournament titles)
- Regular season: 1915, 1948, 1949, 1950, 1951, 1952, 1953, 1954, 1955, 1956, 1957, 1961, 1963, 1967, 1977, 1990, 1993, 1994*, 1995, 1997, 1998, 1999, 2006, 2008*, 2010, 2014, 2019, 2021, 2023, 2024
- Tournament: 1990, 1993, 1997, 1999, 2006, 2010, 2018, 2024
Men's Indoor Track & Field (15)
- 1974, 1975, 1992, 1993, 1994, 1999, 2006, 2007*, 2008, 2009, 2013, 2015, 2017, 2021, 2022
Men's Outdoor Track & Field (56)
- 1915, 1916, 1920, 1923, 1924, 1925, 1926, 1927, 1932, 1933, 1934, 1935, 1936, 1937, 1940, 1941, 1942, 1944, 1945, 1946, 1950, 1954, 1955, 1956, 1957, 1958, 1959, 1961, 1966, 1968, 1969, 1972, 1973, 1974, 1975, 1976, 1977, 1979, 1986, 1987, 1992, 1993, 1994, 1995, 1996, 1997, 1999, 2003, 2006, 2013, 2015, 2016, 2017, 2021, 2022, 2023
Women's Basketball (13 regular season titles; 12 tournament titles)
- Regular season: 1983, 1984, 1985, 1986, 1987, 1988, 1989, 1990, 1993, 1996, 2003, 2004, 2023
- Tournament: 1983, 1984, 1985, 1986, 1987, 1988, 1989, 1990, 1994, 2003, 2022, 2024
Women's Cross Country (4)
- 1985, 1986, 1987, 1989
Women's Golf (18)
- 1984, 1987, 1988, 1989, 1990, 1991, 1993, 1994, 1995, 1996, 1997, 2004, 2011, 2017, 2018, 2019, 2022, 2024
Women's Soccer (2 regular season title; 4 tournament titles)
- Regular season: 2001, 2022
- Tournament: 2006, 2007, 2023, 2024
Softball (5 regular season titles; 4 tournament titles)
- Regular season: 2002, 2003, 2006, 2010, 2024
- Tournament: 1999, 2002, 2003, 2005
Women's Swimming and Diving (36)
- 1983, 1984, 1985, 1986, 1987, 1988, 1989, 1990, 1991, 1992, 1993, 1994, 1995, 1996, 1999, 2000, 2001, 2002, 2003, 2004, 2005, 2006, 2009, 2011, 2013, 2014, 2015, 2016, 2017, 2018, 2019, 2020, 2021, 2022, 2023, 2024
Women's Tennis (23 regular season titles; 22 tournament titles)
- Regular season: 1983, 1984, 1985, 1987, 1989, 1990, 1992, 1993, 1994, 1995, 1996, 1997, 1998, 1999, 2000, 2001, 2002, 2004, 2007*, 2018, 2019, 2021, 2023
- Tournament: 1988, 1989, 1990, 1991, 1992, 1993, 1994, 1995, 1996, 1997, 1998, 1999, 2000, 2001, 2002, 2005, 2012, 2013, 2018, 2021, 2022, 2023
Women's Indoor Track & Field (25)
- 1985, 1986, 1987, 1988, 1989, 1990, 1991, 1992, 1993, 1994, 1995, 1996, 1998, 1999, 2002, 2003, 2006, 2014, 2015, 2016, 2018, 2019, 2020, 2021, 2022
Women's Outdoor Track & Field (24)
- 1985, 1986, 1987, 1988, 1989, 1991, 1992, 1993, 1994, 1995, 1996, 1997, 1998, 1999, 2003, 2004, 2006, 2012, 2014, 2015, 2016, 2019, 2021, 2022
Volleyball (29 regular season titles; 3 tournament titles)
- Regular season: 1982, 1983, 1984, 1985, 1986, 1987, 1988, 1989, 1990, 1991, 1992, 1993, 1995, 1997, 2007*, 2008*, 2009, 2011, 2012, 2013, 2014, 2015, 2017, 2018, 2019, 2020, 2021, 2022, 2023
- Tournament: 1992, 1993, 1995

* Denotes shared conference title
† Denotes an AIAW Championship. The University of Texas began NCAA and Southwest Conference competition in women's sports for the 1982–83 season.

== Rivalries ==
The university's biggest rival is Texas A&M University. However, in football, Texas considers the Oklahoma Sooners to be a more significant rival. According to Bill Little, the Longhorns' assistant athletic director, the rivalry against A&M is "based on respect", while the rivalry against Oklahoma is "based on anger". Other teams have also been considered to be rivals of the Longhorns in various sports. This list includes several other colleges in Texas, such as Texas Christian, Baylor, Rice, Texas Tech, and Houston.

=== Arkansas Razorbacks ===
Texas is also one of the biggest rivals of the University of Arkansas, which may be attributed to their long tenure as the two eponymous state schools of the former Southwest Conference, or to the 1969 game between the two, which decided the national championship in favor of the Longhorns.

=== Oklahoma Sooners ===
Texas has a long-standing, bitter rivalry with the University of Oklahoma. The football game between the University of Texas and Oklahoma is commonly known as the "Red River Shootout" and is held annually in Dallas, Texas, at the Cotton Bowl. This name has come to refer to the two schools' contests in other major team sports as well. Since 2005, the football game has received sponsorship dollars in return for being referred to as the "SBC Red River Rivalry" (changed to AT&T Red River Rivalry in 2006 when SBC changed its corporate name to AT&T), a move which has been criticized both for its commercialism and its political correctness.

In recent years, this rivalry has taken on added significance, since both football programs have been highly ranked and compete in the same division of the Big 12 conference. In 2005, The Dallas Morning News did an opinion poll of the 119 Division 1A football coaches as to the nations top rivalry game in college football. The Texas–Oklahoma game was ranked third.

=== Texas A&M Aggies ===
The annual football game with Texas A&M usually took place on the weekend of Thanksgiving each year, though it was moved to the first weekend in December in 1994 due to A&M's TV restriction during probation. In either case, the Texas-Texas A&M game was the last regular-season contest for each team. The Longhorns lead the series, 76–37–5.

In an attempt to generate more attention for the rivalry in sports other than football, in 2004 the two schools started the Lone Star Showdown, which began as a two-year trial program and has continued ever since. Essentially, each time the two schools meet in a sport, the winner of the matchup gets a point. In sports wherein the teams meet twice one half point is awarded for a victory. If more contests than two occur, such as in baseball, the series winner gets one point. At the end of the year, the school with the most points wins the series and receives a trophy. In the event of a tie the current holder retains the trophy as did A&M after the '08–'09 season. Texas leads the series 6–2.

Aspects of the rivalry include:

- Each school mentions the other in their fight song (Texas with "and it's goodbye to A&M" in "Texas Fight", and the Aggies singing about Texas for essentially the entire second verse of the Aggie War Hymn, which is the only verse typically sung)
- The football series between the two universities is the third longest running rivalry in all of college football. From 1900 to 2011, the last regular season football game was usually reserved for their matchup.
- Each school has elaborate pre-game preparations for the annual football clash, including the Aggie Bonfire and the Hex Rally
- Texas has a unique lighting scheme for the Tower after wins over Texas A&M.
- In the past, mischief has preceded the annual game, such as "kidnapping" each other's mascots.

With Texas A&M's move to the Southeastern Conference, the Lone Star Showdown's final game was played on November 24, 2011, at Kyle Field. The Longhorns won, 27–25, on a last-second field goal. The 2011 game marked the end of a 118-year Thanksgiving Day tradition. With the Longhorns set to join the Southeastern Conference no later than July 1, 2024, the rivalry will resume as a conference game.

=== Texas Tech Red Raiders ===
The Longhorns and Red Raiders football teams compete annually for a traveling trophy called the Chancellor's Spurs. The exchange began in 1996, and the Longhorns lead the football series, 55–18.

=== Rice Owls ===
A long-standing and historic rivalry with the Rice Owls, which has been largely dominated by Texas, has been played since 1914. The game is still played frequently, with Texas winning the latest matchup 37–10 (2023). The Owls most recent victory in the rivalry came in 1994 when they won 19–17 at Rice Stadium, they would also go on to win the Southwest Conference that year. There are currently no future games scheduled in the series.

== Facilities ==
Major sporting facilities and their main uses include:

- Darrell K Royal-Texas Memorial Stadium — football
- Moody Center — basketball
- Denton A. Cooley Pavilion — basketball practice facility
- UFCU Disch-Falk Field — baseball
- Mike A. Myers Stadium — soccer; track and field
- Red and Charline McCombs Field — softball
- Gregory Gymnasium — volleyball
- Lee and Joe Jamail Texas Swimming Center — swimming and diving
- Texas Tennis Center — tennis
- Texas Rowing Center — rowing
- The University of Texas Golf Club — golf

In addition, the University of Texas has numerous practice, training, and intramural facilities.

== Traditions ==
The University of Texas many traditions which associated with athletics events, especially football. Some Longhorn traditions include:

- Bevo – the school mascot, a live Texas longhorn steer present for football games and other special events. It is a common misconception that the mascot's name came from Texas students altering a 13–0 branding a group of Aggies gave the steer. Bevo received his name several months before the Aggies could vandalize the steer in a Texas alumni magazine. His name came from the slang term for a steer that is destined to become food, beeve, and in a common practice for the 1900s and 1910s, an "O" was added at the end, similar to Groucho or Harpo Marx.
- Big Bertha – claimed by the university to be the world's largest drum, however Purdue University makes a similar claim about their drum.
- Hook 'em Horns – the school hand signal, was introduced at a pep rally in 1955. Sports Illustrated featured the Hook 'em Horns symbol in front of a Texas pennant on the cover of their September 10, 1973 issue.
- "Texas Fight" – the school fight song.
- Texas! – Fight! cheer – one side of the stadium yells "Texas!" and then the other side yells "Fight!"; this is usually repeated several times.
- Script Texas – half-time routine by the Longhorn Band.
- Smokey the Cannon – fired in celebration on game day at the moment of kickoff and after Texas scores.
- The University of Texas Longhorn Band — nicknamed The Showband of the Southwest.
- World's Largest Texas Flag — run on the field prior to home football games, bowl games, and other sporting events. It is also dropped from the President's Balcony during pep rallies. It is owned by the UT Alpha Rho chapter of Alpha Phi Omega.
- Lighting the Tower (also known as the Main Building) — in orange for various types of sporting victories and, after national championship victories, windows are lit on the Tower to display a large number "1".

== Merchandise ==
For nine straight years (2005–2013), Texas was listed as the number one Collegiate Licensing Company client in regards to the amount of annual trademark royalties received from the sales of its fan merchandise. Schools that are not members of Collegiate Licensing Company however are not ranked in the listing. Money from merchandising sales goes to the university, as opposed to being earmarked specifically for athletics programs.

== TV channel ==
On January 20, 2011, the UT athletic department announced plans to launch a 24-hour channel devoted entirely to UT sports and academic activities at the University of Texas. This channel, a joint venture with ESPN, takes advantage of a clause in new Big 12 Conference television contracts allowing Texas a bigger share of revenues than the conference's other members; in turn, it was part of the agreement to keep the conference together amidst a full-scale plan by the Pac-10 Conference to raid Big 12 members. (The Pac-10 only gained one Big 12 school, Colorado). Both sides hoped to launch the channel for the 2011–2012 academic year, but needed carriage commitments first.

Banners with the name "ESPN Texas" were visible during segments of SportsCenter and other programs originating from Sundance Square in Fort Worth, Texas in the week prior to Super Bowl XLV. The channel was launched in August 2011 as the Longhorn Network.

Before its launch, the network had controversial plans to air high school football games, an institution throughout the state of Texas. Currently, the state's governing body for public high school sports, the University Interscholastic League, prohibits live game telecasts on Friday nights. It had also been speculated that any telecast on the new channel, regardless of when it aired, could violate NCAA rules against unfair recruiting inducements. This was especially an issue for Texas A&M; in fact, the plans for the network to air high school games directly led to A&M's decision in July 2011 to leave the Big 12 for the SEC. The Big 12 then approved a temporary rule in August 2011 banning the planned high school telecasts, and within two weeks, the NCAA ruled that no school or conference network could broadcast high school games, ending that particular controversy.

== Boosters ==
The University of Texas is known to have a big group of powerful boosters that help support a third of the budget of the athletics department. The main people known to be involved are:

- W.A. "Tex" Moncrief
- Joe Jamail
- Red McCombs
- Mike A. Myers
- Frank Denius
- B. M. "Mack" Rankin Jr.
- Jim Bob Moffett
- Robert Rowling

== See also ==
- List of sports awards honoring women
