= Texas Longhorns women's cross country =

- University: University of Texas at Austin
- Athletic director: Chris Del Conte
- Head coach: Edrick Floréal (2nd season)
- Conference: SEC
- Location: Austin, TX
- Nickname: Longhorns
- Colors: Burnt Orange and White

National championships
- 1986

NCAA Championship appearances
- 1985, 1986, 1987, 1988, 1989, 1998, 1999, 2001, 2002, 2003, 2010, 2011, 2012, 2015, 2017, 2018, 2019, 2024

Conference champions
- SWC; 1985, 1986, 1987, 1989

The Texas Longhorns women's cross country team represents the University of Texas at Austin in NCAA Division I intercollegiate women's cross country competition. The Longhorns competed in the Big 12 Conference through the 2024 season and moved to the Southeastern Conference (SEC) on July 1, 2024.

The Longhorns are coached by Edrick Floréal. They have won four Southwest Conference championships and the 1986 NCAA Cross Country Championship.

== Yearly Record ==
Season	Head Coach	NCAA	Conference
Southwest Conference
1983	Terry Crawford		2nd (61)
1984	Terry Crawford		2nd (58)
1985	Terry Crawford	5th (143)	T-1st (38)
1986	Terry Crawford	1st (62)	1st (23)
1987	Terry Crawford	4th (141)	1st (37)
1988	Terry Crawford	16th (324)	2nd (54)
1989	Terry Crawford	19th (414)	1st (45)
1990	Terry Crawford		9th (237)
1991	Terry Crawford		2nd (60)
1992	Beverly Kearney		5th (124)
1993	Beverly Kearney		3rd (75)
1994	Beverly Kearney		4th (87)
Big 12 Conference
1995	Beverly Kearney		5th (145)
1996	Beverly Kearney		8th (202)
1997	Beverly Kearney		6th (174)
1998	Beverly Kearney	29th (508)	4th (110)
1999	Beverly Kearney	22nd (472)	6th (142)
2000	Beverly Kearney		8th (208)
2001	Beverly Kearney	28th (620)	3rd (115)
2002	Beverly Kearney	22nd (529)	3rd (109)
2003	Beverly Kearney	31st (644)	5th (124)
2004	Beverly Kearney		12th (299)
2005	Beverly Kearney		11th (313)
2006	Beverly Kearney		10th (280)
2007	Beverly Kearney		9th (177)
2008	Beverly Kearney		4th (117)
2009	Beverly Kearney		8th (210)
2010	Beverly Kearney	20th (441)	5th (147)
2011	Beverly Kearney	26th (559)	2nd (83)
2012	Beverly Kearney	25th (526)	3rd (87)
2013	Mario Sategna		4th (121)
2014	Mario Sategna		7th (173)
2015	Mario Sategna	31st (828)	6th (158)
2016	Mario Sategna		7th (139)
2017	Tonja Buford-Bailey	31st (788)	3rd (90)
2018	Edrick Floréal	31st (862)	5th (113)
2019	Edrick Floréal	30th (713)	2nd (54)
2020	Edrick Floréal		2nd (62)
2021	Edrick Floréal		4th (133)
2022	Edrick Floréal		4th (130)
2023	Edrick Floréal		T-5th (143)
Southeastern Conference
2024	Edrick Floréal	31st (829)	5th (150)
2025	Edrick Floréal		
Total		1	SWC: 4 Big 12: 0 SEC: 0

== See also ==
- Texas Longhorns men's cross country
- Texas Longhorns men's track and field
- Texas Longhorns women's track and field
