= Marielle Hall =

American runner (born 1992)

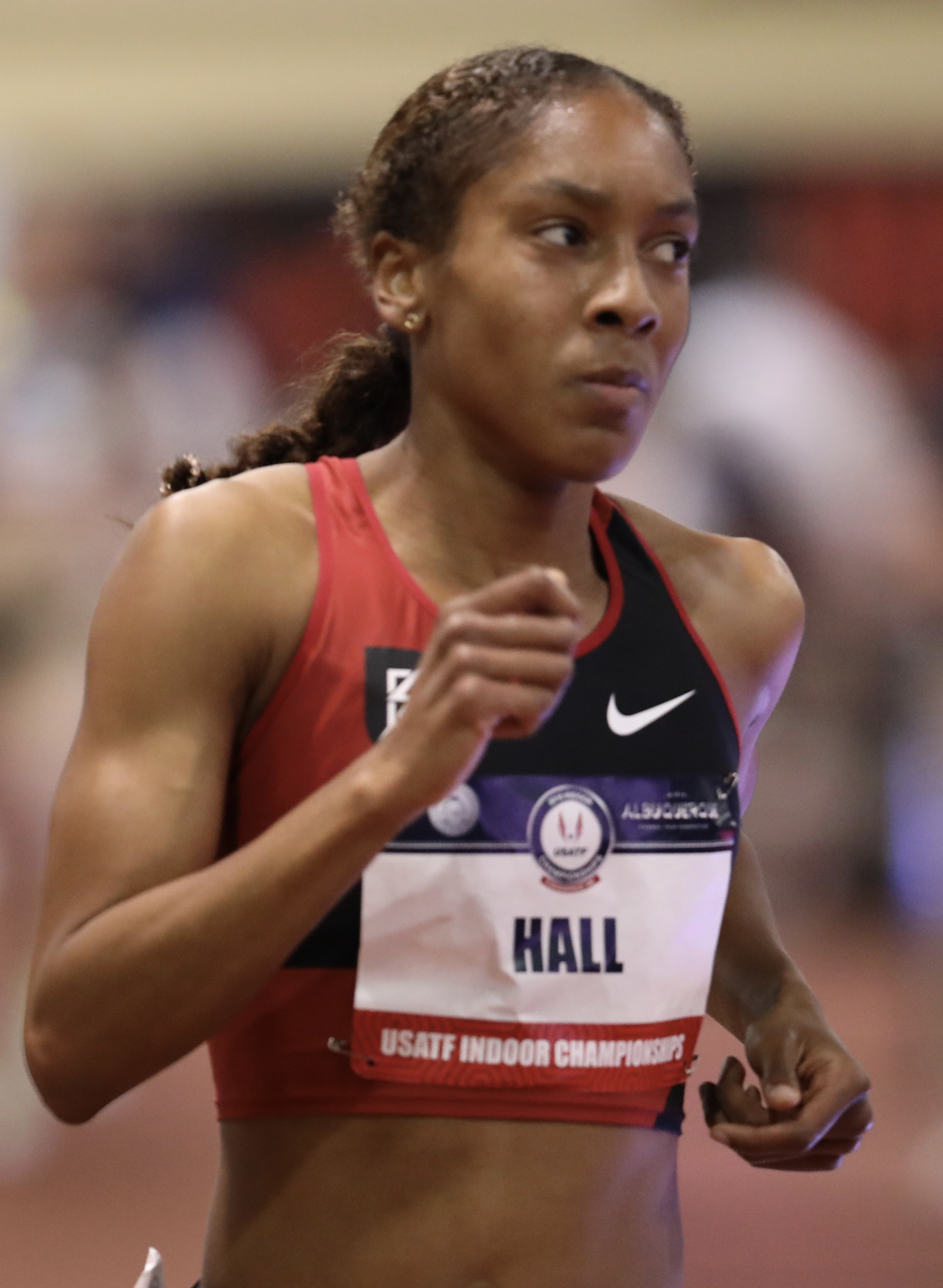
- Marielle Hall in 2018

Personal information
- Born: January 28, 1992 (age 34) Philadelphia, Pennsylvania
- Height: 1.61 m (5 ft 3 in)
- Weight: 50 kg (110 lb)

Sport
- Country: United States
- Sport: Track, long-distance running
- Events: 1500 meters, mile, 5000 meters, 10,000 meters
- College team: Texas
- Club: Nike Running
- Turned pro: 2014

Achievements and titles
- Personal bests: 1500 meters: 4:10.77 (2020); 5000 meters: 15:02.27 (2019); 10,000 meters: 31:05.71 (2019)

Marielle Hall (born January 28, 1992) is a long-distance runner from the United States. She competed in the Women's 5000 meters event at the 2015 World Championships in Athletics in Beijing, China as well as the Women's 10,000 meters final at the 2016 Summer Olympics in Rio de Janeiro, Brazil.

== Career ==
=== IAAF Track and Field and Cross Country ===
Year	Competition	Venue	Position	Event	Notes
2009	6th IAAF World Youth Championships in Athletics	Bressanone, Italy	11th	800 m	2:08.94
2015	15th IAAF World Championships in Athletics	Beijing, China	21st	5000 m	16:06.60
2016	Summer Olympics	Rio de Janeiro, Brazil	33rd	10,000 m	32:39.32
2017	Great Edinburgh Cross Country	Edinburgh, Scotland	17th	6 km	21:54
2017	Great Edinburgh Cross Country	Edinburgh, Scotland	Team USA 3rd	6 km	72 points
2018	2018 NACAC Championships	Toronto, Canada	1st	10000 m	33:27.19
2019	World Cross Country Championships	Aarhus, Denmark	58th	10000 m	40:12
2019	17th IAAF World Championships in Athletics	Doha, Qatar	8th	10,000 m	31:05.71

=== USA Track and Field ===
Year	Competition	Venue	Position	Event	Notes
2003	USA Junior Olympic Outdoor Track and Field Championships	Miami, FL	2nd	1500 m	4:57.93
2009	USA Junior Olympic Outdoor Track and Field Championships	Greensboro, North Carolina	1st	1500 m	4:33.62
2009	USA Junior Olympic Outdoor Track and Field Championships	Greensboro, North Carolina	1st	3000 m	9:56.10
2010	USA Junior Outdoor Track and Field Championships	Des Moines, Iowa	4th	1500 m	4:28.32
2014	USA Outdoor Track and Field Championships	Sacramento, California	3rd	5000 m	15:12.79
2015	USA Outdoor Track and Field Championships	Eugene, Oregon	2nd	5000 m	15:06.45
2016	USA Indoor Track and Field Championships	Portland, Oregon	6th	3000 m	9:01.32
2016	USA Olympic Trials Track and Field Championships	Eugene, Oregon	3rd	10,000 m	31:54.77
2016	USA Olympic Trials Track and Field Championships	Eugene, Oregon	7th	5,000 m	15:24.47
2017	USA Outdoor Track and Field Championships	Sacramento, California	5th	5000 m	15:19.56
2018	USA Indoor Track and Field Championships	Albuquerque, New Mexico	5th	3000 m	9:15.19
2018	USA Outdoor Track and Field Championships	Des Moines, Iowa	2nd	10,000 m	31:56.68
2019	2019 USA Cross Country Championships	Tallahassee, Florida	3rd	10 km	32:57
2019	USA Outdoor Track and Field Championships	Des Moines, Iowa	5th	5000 m	15:20.69
2019	USA Outdoor Track and Field Championships	Des Moines, Iowa	5th	10,000 m	32:14.41
2021	Olympic Trials	Eugene, Oregon	36th	10,000 m	34:35.79

At the 2017 Boston Athletic Association road 5 km in April 2017, Hall placed 4th in a time of 15:08.

=== US Road Championships ===
Year	Competition	Venue	Position	Event	Notes
2017	USATF 7 Mile Championships hosted by Quad-City Times Bix 7	Davenport, Iowa	2nd	7 miles	37:34
2017	USATF 10 km Championships hosted by AJC Peachtree Road Race	Atlanta Georgia	5th	10 km	33:36
2020	USA 15 km Road Championship; Gate River Run	Jacksonville, Florida	1st	15 km	48:52

== NCAA ==
For college, Hall chose to compete for the Texas Longhorns women's cross country where she was a 3-Time All-American, Seven-Time Big-12 Champion. Hall won 5000 meters title at 2014 NCAA Division I Outdoor Track and Field Championships in a tactical 15:35.11 for the Texas Longhorns. During the 2013 cross country season, Hall won the individual title at the Big 12 Conference cross country championships and took 29th place for All-American honors at NCAA national championships.

School Year	Big 12 Conference Cross Country	NCAA Division I Cross Country	Big 12 Conference Indoor track and field	NCAA Division I Indoor track and field	Big 12 Conference Outdoor Track and Field	NCAA Division I Outdoor Track and Field
2014 Senior	1st, 19:38.3	29th, 20:40.0	800 Meters, 1st, 2:02.48		1500 Meters, 1st, 4:20.82	
2014 Senior	1st, 19:38.3	29th, 20:40.0	DMR, 3rd, 11:23.01			5000 Meters, 1st, 15:35.11
2013 Junior	6th, 20:32.7	23rd, 20:04.5	Mile, 1st, 4:41.78		1500 Meters, 11th, 4:40.61	
2013 Junior	6th, 20:32.7	23rd, 20:04.5	3000 Meters, 1st, 9:15.57		5000 Meters, 12th, 17:09.04	
2013 Junior	6th, 20:32.7	23rd, 20:04.5	DMR, 1st, 11:15.90			
2012 Sophomore	8th, 19:52.3	156th, 21:25.0	Mile, 2nd, 4:43.53		1500 Meters, 3rd, 4:23.38	1500 Meters, 23rd, 4:34.15
2012 Sophomore	8th, 19:52.3	156th, 21:25.0	3000 Meters, 6th, 9:34.76		5000 Meters, 8th, 16:51.67	5000 Meters, 69th, 17:12.53
2011 Freshman	46th, 21:48.66		1000 Meters, 1st, 2:46.40		800 Meters, 7th, 2:08.82	800 Meters, 93rd, 2:08.08
2011 Freshman	46th, 21:48.66		DMR, 3rd, 11:14.53			

Hall graduated from University of Texas at Austin in 2014. Hall has represented Nike at local, national, and international events, created social media content for running products and apparel, collaborated with Nike's marketing team to launch the ZoomX Invincible, and attended New York Fashion Week. She has also contributed written material to Runner's World.

== Personal ==
Born in Philadelphia, Hall grew up in Mount Laurel, New Jersey. She graduated from the Haddonfield Memorial High School in Haddonfield, New Jersey in 2010 and University of Texas at Austin in 2014. In Fall 2014, Hall moved to train with coach Derek Thompson and the Juventus Track Club of Philadelphia. In Fall 2017, Hall moved to coach Jerry Schumacher's Portland based group Bowerman Track Club. In Fall 2021, Hall moved to coach Kurt Benninger in Providence, Rhode Island.

== See also ==
- United States at the 2015 World Championships in Athletics
