= Texas Longhorns women's track and field =

- University: University of Texas at Austin
- Athletic director: Chris Del Conte
- Head coach: Edrick Floréal (6th season)
- Conference: SEC
- Location: Austin, Texas, US
- Outdoor track: Mike A. Myers Stadium
- Nickname: Longhorns
- Colors: Burnt Orange and White

NCAA Indoor National Championships
- 1986, 1988, 1990, 1998, 1999, 2006

NCAA Outdoor National Championships
- 1982 (AIAW), 1986, 1998, 1999, 2005, 2023

NCAA Indoor Tournament Appearances
- 1984, 1985, 1986, 1987, 1988, 1989, 1990, 1991, 1992, 1993, 1994, 1995, 1996, 1997, 1998, 1999, 2000, 2001, 2002, 2003, 2004, 2005, 2006, 2007, 2008, 2009, 2010, 2011, 2012, 2013, 2014, 2015, 2016, 2017, 2018, 2019, 2021, 2022

NCAA Outdoor Tournament Appearances
- 1983, 1984, 1985, 1986, 1987, 1988, 1989, 1990, 1991, 1992, 1993, 1994, 1995, 1996, 1997, 1998, 1999, 2000, 2001, 2002, 2003, 2004, 2005, 2006, 2007, 2008, 2009, 2010, 2011, 2012, 2013, 2014, 2015, 2016, 2017, 2018, 2019, 2021

Conference Indoor Championships
- SWC; 1985, 1986, 1987, 1988, 1989, 1990, 1991, 1992, 1993, 1994, 1995, 1996 Big 12; 1998, 1999, 2002, 2003, 2006, 2014, 2015, 2016, 2018, 2019, 2020, 2021, 2022

Conference Outdoor Championships
- SWC; 1985, 1986, 1987, 1988, 1989, 1991, 1992, 1993, 1994, 1995, 1996 Big 12; 1997, 1998, 1999, 2003, 2004, 2006, 2012, 2014, 2015, 2016, 2019, 2021, 2022

The Texas Longhorns women's track and field program represents the University of Texas at Austin in NCAA Division I intercollegiate women's track and field competition. The Longhorns competed in the Big 12 Conference through the 2024 season and moved to the Southeastern Conference (SEC) on July 1, 2024.

The Longhorns are coached by Edrick Floréal, under whom they won the 2023 NCAA outdoor championship. Other notable coaches have included Beverly Kearney, who has guided the Lady Longhorns to six NCAA Championships: Indoor Championships in 1998, 1999, and 2006, and Outdoor Championships in 1998, 1999, and 2005; and Terry Crawford, whose teams won Indoor Championships in 1986, 1988, and 1990, and Outdoor Championships in 1982 and 1986. Crawford's athletes also won the 1986 Women's Cross Country Championship. The program's first title was the 1982 AIAW outdoor track and field championship.

In the summer of 2013 the men's and women's programs were combined under one head coach.

The Longhorn track and field programs have produced numerous Olympians for various nations. Female Olympic medalists have included Julien Alfred (St. Lucia, gold, 100 meters, 2024) Michelle Carter (USA, gold, shot put, 2016), Sanya Richards-Ross (2012: USA, gold, 400 meters and 4 x 400 meter relay; 2008, bronze, 400 meters and gold, 4 x 400 meter relay, 2008), Moushami Robinson (USA, gold, 4 × 400 meter relay, 2004), Sandie Richards (Jamaica, silver, 4 × 400 m relay, 2000 and 2004), Merlene Frazer (Jamaica, silver, 4 × 100 m relay, 2000), Nanceen Perry (USA, bronze, 4 × 100 m relay, 2000), Carlette Guidry (USA, gold, 4 × 100 m relay, 1992 and 1996), Juliet Cuthbert (Jamaica, silver, 100m and 200m, 1992 and bronze, 4 × 100 m relay, 1996), and Nikole Mitchell (Jamaica, bronze, 4 × 100 m relay, 1996).

Courtney Okolo became the first Longhorn to win The Bowerman, an award that honors collegiate track & field's most outstanding athlete of the year. In 2016, she became the first female collegian to run sub-50 seconds in the 400 meters, in turn lowering her own collegiate record to 49.71. Her senior season also included an undefeated record against collegians and four NCAA titles (two individual, two relay).

Alfred won The Bowerman in 2023.

== Head coaches ==
#	Coach	Years	Seasons	National Championships		Conference Championships	
#	Coach	Years	Seasons	Indoor	Outdoor	Indoor	Outdoor
		–1983		0	1	0	0
1	Terry Crawford	1984–1992	9	3	1	8	7
2	Beverly Kearney	1993–2013	21	3	3	9	11
3	Mario Sategna	2014–2017	4	0	0	3	3
4	Tonja Buford-Bailey	2018–2018	1	0	0	1	0
5	Edrick Floréal	2019–present	6	0	1	4	4
Total				6	5	SWC: 12; Big 12: 13	SWC: 11; Big 12: 14

== Yearly Record ==
Season	Coach	NCAA		Conference	
Season	Coach	Indoor	Outdoor	Indoor	Outdoor
Independent
1982			1st (AIAW)		
Southwest Conference
1983			14th (32)	2nd (88)	2nd (130)
1984	Terry Crawford	T-17th (8)	T-11th (39)	2nd (97)	2nd (186.5)
1985	Terry Crawford	2nd (32)	6th (41)	1st (159)	1st (182)
1986	Terry Crawford	1st (31)	1st (65)	1st (137)	1st (180)
1987	Terry Crawford	T-4th (22)	5th (28.5)	1st (127)	1st (209)
1988	Terry Crawford	1st (71)	8th (27)	1st (185)	1st (233)
1989	Terry Crawford	T-3rd (24)	6th (24)	1st (137)	1st (191)
1990	Terry Crawford	1st (50)	T-8th (25)	1st (127)	2nd (114)
1991	Terry Crawford	2nd (39)	2nd (67)	1st (141)	1st (188)
1992	Terry Crawford	10th (15)	T-9th (21)	1st (118)	1st (140)
1993	Beverly Kearney	7th (18)	T-14th (21)	1st (102)	1st (136)
1994	Beverly Kearney	T-3rd (28)	2nd (43)	1st (107)	1st (150)
1995	Beverly Kearney	3rd (32)	T-6th (27)	1st (127)	1st (122)
1996	Beverly Kearney	3rd (31)	2nd (52)	1st (123)	1st (144)
Big 12 Conference
1997	Beverly Kearney	T-2nd (39)	2nd (62)	2nd (132.3)	1st (137)
1998	Beverly Kearney	1st (55)	1st (60)	1st (156)	1st (151)
1999	Beverly Kearney	1st (61)	1st (62)	1st (150)	1st (168)
2000	Beverly Kearney	8th (23)	5th (39)	2nd (137.5)	2nd (146)
2001	Beverly Kearney	11th (18)	10th (39)	2nd (105.5)	3rd (109.5)
2002	Beverly Kearney	T-11th (18)	T-10th (19)	1st (107)	2nd (120)
2003	Beverly Kearney	5th (35)	2nd (50)	1st (167)	1st (188)
2004	Beverly Kearney	T-7th (30)	4th (42)	2nd (155)	1st (151)
2005	Beverly Kearney	9th (23)	1st (55)	2nd (97)	2nd (117)
2006	Beverly Kearney	1st (51)	6th (36)	1st (125)	1st (131)
2007	Beverly Kearney	8th (22)	6th (29)	2nd (104)	3rd (89)
2008	Beverly Kearney	4th (35)	46th (5)	4th (79)	7th (59)
2009	Beverly Kearney	4th (31)	5th (36)	5th (83.5)	5th (79)
2010	Beverly Kearney	42nd (4)	51st (3)	7th (58)	3rd (93)
2011	Beverly Kearney	2nd (38)	8th (25)	3rd (96.5)	4th (90.5)
2012	Beverly Kearney	4th (25)	11th (20)	2nd (112)	1st (139)
2013	Beverly Kearney	18th (12)	15th (18)	2nd (148)	2nd (145)
2014	Mario Sategna	2nd (43.5)	2nd (66)	1st (147)	1st (149)
2015	Mario Sategna	6th (33)	9th (28)	1st (139)	1st (141.5)
2016	Mario Sategna	4th (44)	4th (36)	1st (147)	1st (167.7)
2017	Mario Sategna	T-25th (9)	7th (32)	2nd (100)	2nd (128.5)
2018	Tonja Buford-Bailey	54th (1)	34th (7)	1st (117)	2nd (131)
2019	Edrick Floréal	T-12th (14)	T-10th (20)	1st (129)	1st (172)
2020	Edrick Floréal	—	—	1st (180.3)	—
2021	Edrick Floréal	8th (25)	T-7th (28)	1st (154.5)	1st (207)
2022	Edrick Floréal	2nd (56)	2nd (64)	1st (36)	1st (173.5)
2023	Edrick Floréal	2nd (60)	1st (83)	2nd (136.5)	1st (197)
Southeastern Conference
2024	Edrick Floréal				
Total		6	5	SWC: 12; Big 12: 13	SWC: 11; Big 12: 13

Note: The 2020 season was canceled after the Big 12 Indoor Championships due to the Coronavirus Pandemic, the Big 12 Outdoor and NCAA Championships were not held.

== NCAA Individual Event Champions ==
Indoor
Year	Name	Event	Time/Mark
1981	Etienne, Holmes, Sherfield, Coleman	4x100 Meter Relay	3:37.9
1982	Sherfield, Walker, Bean, Coleman	4x100 Meter Relay	3:44.7
1986	Karol Davidson	1,000 Meter	2:42.7
1988	Carlette Guidry	55 Meter	6.72
1988	Carlette Guidry	Long Jump	21' 0.75"
1988	Karol Davidson	800 Meter	2:08.2
1988	Angie Bradburn	High Jump	6' 2"
1988	Roberts, Bolden, Guidry, Flowers	4x400 Meter Relay	3:37.2
1990	Carlette Guidry	55 Meter	6.66
1990	Carlette Guidry	200 Meter	23.28
1990	Roberts, Guidry, Ates, Richards	4x400 Meter Relay	3:32
1991	Carlette Guidry	55 Meter	6.74
1991	Carlette Guidry	200 Meter	23.23
1993	Telisa Young	Triple Jump	43' 3.25"
1994	Telisa Young	Triple Jump	43' 3.75"
1994	Eileen Vanisi	Shot Put	58' 1.75"
1995	Merlene Frazer	200 Meter	23.14
1995	Davis, Howard, Brown, Frazer	4x400 Meter Relay	3:32.2
1997	Nanceen Perry	200 Meter	23.09
1998	Suziann Reid	400 Meter	52.57
1998	Erin Aldrich	High Jump	6' 4.25"
1998	Angie Vaughn	55m Hurdles	7.41
1998	LaKeisha Backus	200 Meter	23.18
1999	Suziann Reid	400 Meter	51.68
1999	Erin Aldrich	High Jump	6' 3.5"
1999	Patterson, Haddad, Jarrett, Reid	4x400 Meter Relay	3:31.5
2000	Johnson, Patterson, Robinson, Jarrett	4x400 Meter Relay	3:32.6
2003	Downer, McIntosh, Robinson, Richards	4x400 Meter Relay	3:27.7
2004	Aiken, McIntosh, Jones, Richards	4x400 Meter Relay	3:28.7
2004	Sanya Richards	400 Meter	50.82
2006	Michelle Carter	Shot Put	60' 10.75"
2006	Marshevet Hooker	60 Meter	7.2
2006	Marshevet Hooker	Long Jump	22' 0.25"
2008	Bianca Knight	200 Meter	22.4
2009	Destinee Hooker	High Jump	6' 6"
2014	Kaitlin Petrillose	Pole Vault	15' 1"
2015	Courtney Okolo	400 Meter	51.12
2015	Akinosun, Spencer, Baisden, Okolo	4x400 Meter Relay	3:28.5
2016	Teahna Daniels	60 Meter	7.11
2016	Courtney Okolo	400 Meter	50.69
2016	Gordon, Jones, Akionsun, Okolo	4x400 Meter Relay	3:28.3
2021	Tara Davis	Long Jump	22' 9"
2023	Julien Alfred	60 Meters	6.94
2023	Julien Alfred	200 Meters	22.01

Outdoor
Year	Name	Event	Time/Mark
1979	Kathy Devine	Shot Put	52' 7.75"
1982	Neugebauer, Coleman, Walker, Arnold	4x800 Meter Relay	8:39.7
1982	Denny, Sherfield, Bean, Shurr	4x100 Meter Relay	46.04
1982	Sherfield, Walker, Bean, Coleman	4x400 Meter Relay	3:37.7
1982	Denny, Sherfield, Shurr, Coleman	800 Meter Medley	1:39.9
1982	Lorri Kokkola	Javelin	170' 9"
1984	Terri Turner	Triple Jump	44' 2"
1985	Juliet Cuthbert	200 Meter	22.55
1986	Juliet Cuthbert	100 Meter	11.27
1986	Juliet Cuthbert	200 Meter	22.71
1986	Terri Turner	Triple Jump	44' 9.75"
1987	Annie Schweitzer	5,000 Meter	15:46.00
1989	Roberts, Saldana, Flowers, Guidry	4x400 Meter Relay	3:31.2
1990	Angie Bradburn	High Jump	6' 2.75"
1991	Carlette Guidry	100 Meter	10.91
1991	Carlette Guidry	200 Meter	22.44
1991	Eileen Vanisi	Shot Put	57' 9"
1991	Clack, Saldana, Williams, Guidry	4x100 Meter Relay	42.88
1994	Merlene Frazer	200 Meter	22.49
1994	Eileen Vanisi	Shot Put	58' 2.5"
1996	Suziann Reid	400 Meter	52.16
1996	Riley, Reid, Howard, Brown	4x400 Meter Relay	3:27.5
1997	Dana Riley	800 Meter	2:02.9
1997	Riley, Howard, Brown, Reid	4x400 Meter Relay	3:28.4
1998	Erin Aldrich	High Jump	6' 4"
1998	Suziann Reid	400 Meter	51.22
1998	Angie Vaughn	100 Meter Hurdles	12.82
1998	McGruder, Perry, Vaughn, Backus	4x100 Meter Relay	42.76
1998	Patterson, Brown, Haddad, Reid	4x400 Meter Relay	3:28.6
1999	Suziann Reid	400 Meter	51.08
1999	McGruder, Perry, White, Backus	4x100 Meter Relay	42.95
1999	Patterson, Haddad, Jarrett, Reid	4x400 Meter Relay	3:27.1
2000	Erin Aldrich	High Jump	6' 2.75"
2003	Sanya Richards	400 Meter	50.58
2003	Downer, Robinson, McIntosh, Richards	4x400 Meter Relay	3:26.8
2004	Nichole Denby	100 Meter Hurdles	12.62
2005	Marshevet Hooker	100 Meter	11.16
2005	Kerr, Walker, Chapple, Hooker	4x100 Meter Relay	42.87
2005	Jones, Walker, Kerr, Chapple	4x400 Meter Relay	3:27.1
2006	Destinee Hooker	High Jump	6' 2.25"
2006	Lee, Anderson, Kerr, Walker	4x100 Meter Relay	42.84
2007	Destinee Hooker	High Jump	6' 3.5"
2009	Destinee Hooker	High Jump	6' 4.7"
2009	Alexandria Anderson	100 Meter	11.2
2009	Nwosu, Cooper, Anderson, Malone	4x400 Meter Relay	3:28.5
2014	Courtney Okolo	400 Meter	50.23
2014	Marielle Hall	5,000 Meter	15:35.1
2014	Nelson, Baisden, Akinosun, Okolo	4x400 Meter Relay	3:42.2
2016	Courtney Okolo	400 Meter	50.36
2016	Gordon, Akinosun, Golden, Okolo	4x400 Meter Relay	3:27.6
2017	Chrisann Gordon	400 Meter	50.51
2019	Ashtin Zamzow	Heptathlon	6,222
2021	Tara Davis	Long Jump	21’ 11.75”
2022	Alfred, Adeleke, Davis, Flannel	4x100 Meter Relay	42.42
2022	Julien Alfred	100 Meter	11.02
2023	Julien Alfred	100 Meters	10.72
2023	Julien Alfred	200 Meters	21.73
2023	Rhasidat Adeleke	400 Meters	49.20
2023	Alfred, Abba, Adeleke, Davis	4x100 Meter Relay	41.60
2023	Ackelia Smith	Long Jump	6.88

== Conference Individual Event Champions ==
Source
As of May 16, 2022

Indoor
Event	Titles
55-Meter Hurdles	4
60-Yard Hurdles	2
60-Meter Hurdles	10
55 Meters	8
60 Meters	11
60 Yards	2
200 Meters	17
400 Meters	18
440 Yards	1
600 Yards	13
800 Meters	12
880 Yards	1
1000 Meters	2
1000 Yards	3
Mile	8
Two-Mile	1
3000 Meters	3
5000 Meters	1
4x400-Meter Relay	16
4x800-Meter Relay	6
Distance Medley Relay	3
High Jump	12
Pole Vault	4
Long Jump	9
Triple Jump	9
Shot Put	4
Pentathlon	5

Outdoor
Event	Titles
100-Meter Hurdles	11
400-Meter Hurdles	17
100 Meters	25
200 Meters	22
400 Meters	22
800 Meters	12
1500 Meters	11
3000 Meters	5
5000 Meters	5
10000 Meters	2
4x100-Meter Relay	23
4x400-Meter Relay	21
High Jump	13
Pole Vault	5
Long Jump	7
Triple Jump	6
Shot Put	6
Discus	7
Javelin	10
Heptathlon	8

== See also ==
- Texas Longhorns men's track and field
- Texas Longhorns men's cross country
- Texas Longhorns women's cross country
