= Janice Bryant Howroyd =

American businesswoman (born 1952)

- Born: September 1, 1952 (age 73); Tarboro, North Carolina, U.S.
- Education: North Carolina Agricultural and Technical State University
- Occupations: Entrepreneur, businesswoman, author
- Years active: 1978–present
- Organization: The ActOne Group
- Known for: Founder and CEO of The ActOne Group
- Board member of: Congressional Black Caucus Foundation; North Carolina Agricultural and Technical State University Board of Trustees
- Spouse: Bernard Howroyd (m. 1983; died 2020)
- Website: askjbh.com

Janice Bryant Howroyd (born September 1, 1952) is an entrepreneur, businesswoman, and author. She is founder and chief executive officer of The ActOne Group, the largest privately held, minority-woman-owned personnel company founded in the U.S. Howroyd is the first African-American woman to build and own a billion dollar company.

== Early life and education ==
Janice Bryant was born on September 1, 1952, in Tarboro, North Carolina, the fourth of 11 children in her family. As a teen, she was one of the first African American students to participate in desegregation of her town's high school. Howard later attended North Carolina Agricultural and Technical State University.

== Career ==
In 1976, Howroyd moved to Los Angeles, California, and worked as a temporary secretary for her brother-in-law, Tom Noonan, at Billboard magazine. While at Billboard, Noonan introduced Howroyd to business executives, celebrities, travel, and workplace diversity.

With an approximate budget of $1,000 Howroyd continued to focus on employment services and launched her own company, The ACT 1 Group, in Beverly Hills, California, in 1978, with Tom Noonan as her first client. The company later expanded into The ActOne Group, a workforce solutions organization providing temporary staffing and recruitment services. Some ActOne Group Companies include AppleOne, All's Well, AT-Tech, ACT Now Personnel Services, ActOne Government Solutions, A-Check Global, which provide personnel and recruiting services to different industries, and DSSI, which provides document management services.

Howroyd is an ambassador of the Department of Energy's Minorities in Energy Initiative, a board member to numerous organizations including the United States Department of Labor's Workforce Initiative Board, Women's Business Enterprise National Council, WeConnect, National Utilities Diversity Council, Harvard Women's Leadership Board, California Science Center, Los Angeles Urban League and a member of the Industry Trade Advisory Committee on Services and Finance Industries of the U.S. Trade Representative and the United States Department of Commerce. She also serves on the board of trustees for North Carolina Agricultural and Technical State University.

In May 2016 Howroyd received a key presidential appointment by President Barack Obama as a member of the President's Board of Advisors on Historically Black Colleges and Universities. In 2017 she joined the Diversity Committee of the FCC.

Since 2016, Howroyd has served on the Congressional Black Caucus Foundation Board of Directors as an officer as Treasurer.

== Bibliography ==
- The Art of Work – How to Make Work, Work for You! (2009)
- Acting Up – Winning in Business and Life Using Down-Home Wisdom (2019)

== Awards and honors ==
- 2008 The BET Honors Entrepreneur Award - 2008
- 2011 National Association of Women Business Owners Hall of Fame Honoree - 2011
- 2015 "National Black College Alumni Hall of Fame" Inductee - 2015
- 2016 Black Enterprise A.G. Gaston Award - 2016
- 2025 Honorary Membership Inductee, Delta Sigma Theta sorority

== Personal life ==
Howroyd has been married to her husband, Bernard.
