= The BET Honors =

BET Honors
- Awarded for: Celebrates Black Excellence
- Country: United States
- Presented by: All celebrities
- First award: 2008
- Final award: 2016

Television/radio coverage
- Network: BET

The BET Honors were established in 2008 by the Black Entertainment Television network to respect the lives and achievements of African-American luminaries. The awards will be presented annually and broadcast on BET during Black History Month.

== Ceremony Location ==
The inaugural ceremonies, in 2008, were held at the Warner Theatre in Washington, D.C.

== Hosts ==
Comedian Cedric the Entertainer hosted the first BET Honors in 2008.
Actress Gabrielle Union has hosted the BET Honors consecutively for the past five years

== 2008 ==
=== Honorees ===
- Alicia Keys (Entertainment Award)
- Tyra Banks (Media Award)
- Dr. Cornel West, University Professor in the Center for African American Studies (Award for Education)
- Richard Parsons (Corporate Citizen Award)
- The Honorable Maxine Waters (Public Service Award)
- CEO Janice Bryant Howroyd (Entrepreneur Award)

=== Performers and Presenters ===
- Stevie Wonder
- John Legend
- Gladys Knight
- Wyclef Jean
- Jill Scott
- Brian McKnight
- Ne-Yo
- Raheem DeVaughn
- Blair Underwood
- Danny Glover
- Kerry Washington
- Idris Elba
- Hill Harper
- Vivica A. Fox

== 2009 ==
=== Honorees ===
- Magic Johnson (Corporate Citizen Award)
- Tyler Perry (Media Award)
- B. Smith (Entrepreneur Award)
- Mary J. Blige (Entertainer Award)
- Judith Jamison (Education Award)
- James Clyburn (Public Service Award)

=== Performers and Presenters ===
- Stevie Wonder
- Yolanda Adams
- Anita Baker
- Monica
- Joss Stone
- Ne-Yo
- Queen Latifah
- Anthony Hamilton
- Keyshia Cole
- Whitney Houston

== 2010 ==
=== List of Honorees ===
- Whitney Houston (Entertainers Award)
- Queen Latifah (Media Award)
- Sean “Diddy” Combs (Entrepreneur Award)
- Ruth Simmons (Education Award)
- Keith Black (Public Service Award)

=== Performers and Presenters ===
- Jennifer Hudson
- Mary J. Blige
- India.Arie
- Patti LaBelle
- Stevie Wonder
- Trey Songz
- Jazmine Sullivan
- Kim Burrell

== 2011 ==
=== Honorees ===
- Jamie Foxx (Entertainer)
- Cicely Tyson (Theatrical Arts Award)
- Herbie Hancock (Musical Arts Award)
- Iman (Service Award)
- Lonnie Bunch (Education Award)
- Linda Johnson-Rice (Media Award)

=== Performers and Presenters ===
- Ne-Yo
- Nicole Ari Parker
- Boris Kodjoe
- Chick Corea
- Lalah Hathaway
- Keyshia Cole
- Tank & Guy
- Naturally 7
- Trey Songz
- Yolanda Adams
- Marsha Ambrosius

== 2012 ==
=== Honorees ===
- Maya Angelou (Literary Arts Award)
- Stevie Wonder (Musical Arts Award)
- Mariah Carey (Entertainer Award)
- Spike Lee (Media Award)
- Beverly Kearney (Education Award)
- Tuskegee Airmen (Service Award)

=== Performers and Presenters ===
- Michelle Obama
- Willow Smith
- Aretha Franklin
- Common
- Cuba Gooding Jr.
- Terrence Howard
- Cicely Tyson
- Kelly Rowland
- Jill Scott
- John Singleton
- Jennifer Hudson
- Ledisi
- Patti LaBelle
- Anthony Hamilton
- Luke James
- Nick Cannon and his son Moroccan Cannon

== 2013 ==
=== Honorees ===
- Halle Berry (Service Award)
- T.D. Jakes (Education Award)
- Chaka Khan (Musical Arts Award)
- Lisa Leslie (Athletics Award)
- Clarence Avant (Entrepreneur Award)

== 2014 ==
=== Honorees ===
- Kenneth Chenault (Corporate Citizen Award)
- Aretha Franklin (Musical Arts Award)
- Carrie Mae Weems (Visual Arts)
- Ice Cube (Entertainer Award)
- Berry Gordy (Entrepreneur Award)
- Nelson Mandela (Leadership Award)

== 2015 ==
Comedian Wayne Brady hosted.

=== Honorees ===
- Kanye West (Visionary Award)
- Usher (Musical Arts Award)
- Phylicia Rashad (Theatrical Arts Award)
- Dr. Johnnetta Betsch Cole (Education Award)
- Kwame Simmons (Digital Special Recognition)
- John W. Thompson (Technology and Business Award)

=== Performers and Presenters ===
- Ne-Yo
- Trey Songz
- Ben Vareen
- K. Michelle
- Dame Dash
- Patti LaBelle
- Mary J. Blige
- Bobby Brown
- Charlie Wilson
- Glynn Turman
- Diahann Carroll
- Anthony Anderson

== 2016 ==
Comedian Arsenio Hall hosted the final ceremony.

=== Honorees ===
- Lee Daniels (The BET Honors Television and Film Award)
- Patti LaBelle (Musical Arts Award)
- LA Reid (Business Entertainment Award)
- Eric Holder (Public Service Award)
- Mellody Hobson (Corporate Citizen Award)

=== Performers and Presenters ===
- Usher
- Ledisi
- Monica
- Babyface
- Fantasia
- The Deele
- Eddie Levert
- Toni Braxton
- Jussie Smollett
- Jazmine Sullivan
- Gabourey Sidibe
- Terrence Howard
- Raheem DeVaughn
