= 1986 NCAA Division I cross country championships =

1986 cross-country running meet of the NCAA (Division I)

1986 NCAA Division I Cross Country Championships
- Organisers: NCAA
- Edition: 48th (Men); 6th (Women)
- Date: November 24, 1986
- Host city: Tucson, Arizona; University of Arizona
- Venue: Canada Hills Country Club
- Distances: 10 km–Men; 5 km–Women
- Participation: 173–Men; 129–Women; 302–Total athletes

The 1986 NCAA Division I Cross Country Championships were the 48th annual NCAA Men's Division I Cross Country Championship and the 6th annual NCAA Women's Division I Cross Country Championship to determine the team and individual national champions of NCAA Division I men's and women's collegiate cross country running in the United States. In all, four different titles were contested: men's and women's individual and team championships.

Held on November 24, 1986, the combined meet was hosted by the University of Arizona at the Canada Hills County Club in Tucson, Arizona. The distance for the men's race was 10 kilometers (6.21 miles) while the distance for the women's race was 5 kilometers (3.11 miles).

The men's team national championship was won by Arkansas, their second national title. The individual championship was won by Aaron Ramirez, from Arizona, with a time of 30:27.53.

The women's team national championship was won by Texas, their first national title. The individual championship was won by Angela Chalmers, from Northern Arizona, with a time of 16:55.49.

== Qualification ==
- All Division I cross country teams were eligible to qualify for the meet through their placement at various regional qualifying meets. In total, 22 teams and 173 runners contested the men's championship while 15 teams and 129 runners contested the women's title.

== Men's title ==
- Distance: 10,000 meters (6.21 miles)

=== Men's Team Result (Top 10) ===
Rank	Team	Points
1st place, gold medalist(s)	Arkansas	69
2nd place, silver medalist(s)	Dartmouth	138
3rd place, bronze medalist(s)	Boston University	145
4	Colorado	191
5	Arizona	221
6	Illinois	228
7	Florida	250
8	Texas	252
9	Northern Arizona	265
10	UC Irvine	276

=== Men's Individual Result (Top 10) ===
Rank	Name	Team	Time
1st place, gold medalist(s)	(United States) Aaron Ramirez	Arizona	30:27.53
2nd place, silver medalist(s)	(United States) Joe Falcon	Arkansas	30:32.73
3rd place, bronze medalist(s)	(United States) Matt Giusto	Arizona	30:52.64
4	(United States) Bob Kempainen	Dartmouth	30:56.36
5	(United States) Paul Gompers	Harvard	31:02.54
6	(Kenya) Joseph Chelelgo	Texas	31:08.13
7	(United States) Frank Horn	Montana	31:09.54
8	(Kenya) Patrick Sang	Texas	31:11.12
9	(United States) John Aelberg	Utah	31:11.61
10	(United States) Dean Crows	Boston University	31:13.31

== Women's title ==
- Distance: 5,000 meters (3.11 miles)

=== Women's Team Result (Top 10) ===
Rank	Team	Points
1st place, gold medalist(s)	Texas	62
2nd place, silver medalist(s)	Wisconsin	64
3rd place, bronze medalist(s)	Kentucky	159
4	Oregon	167
5	Clemson	171
6	Colorado	186
7	Yale	201
8	BYU	203
9	Kansas State	205
10	Arkansas	214

=== Women's Individual Result (Top 10) ===
Rank	Name	Team	Time
1st place, gold medalist(s)	(Canada) Angela Chalmers	Northern Arizona	16:55.49
2nd place, silver medalist(s)	(United States) Suzy Favor-Hamilton	Wisconsin	17:01.55
3rd place, bronze medalist(s)	(United States) Caroline Mullen	Western Michigan	17:07.60
4	(United States) Ute Jamrozy	Clemson	17:11.86
5	(United States) Sandy Blakeslee	Texas	17:17.47
6	(United States) Chris Vanatt	Kansas State	17:18.27
7	(United States) Renee Doyle	Iowa	17:18.55
8	(United States) Stephanie Herbst	Wisconsin	17:18.75
9	(United States) Kathryn Monard	Ohio State	17:19.57
10	(United States) Elizabeth Natalie	Texas	17:21.27

== See also ==
- NCAA Men's Cross Country Championships (Division II, Division III)
- NCAA Women's Cross Country Championships (Division II, Division III)
