= Denton A. Cooley Pavilion =

Training facility of University of Texas

Coordinates: 30.276168°N 97.732927°W

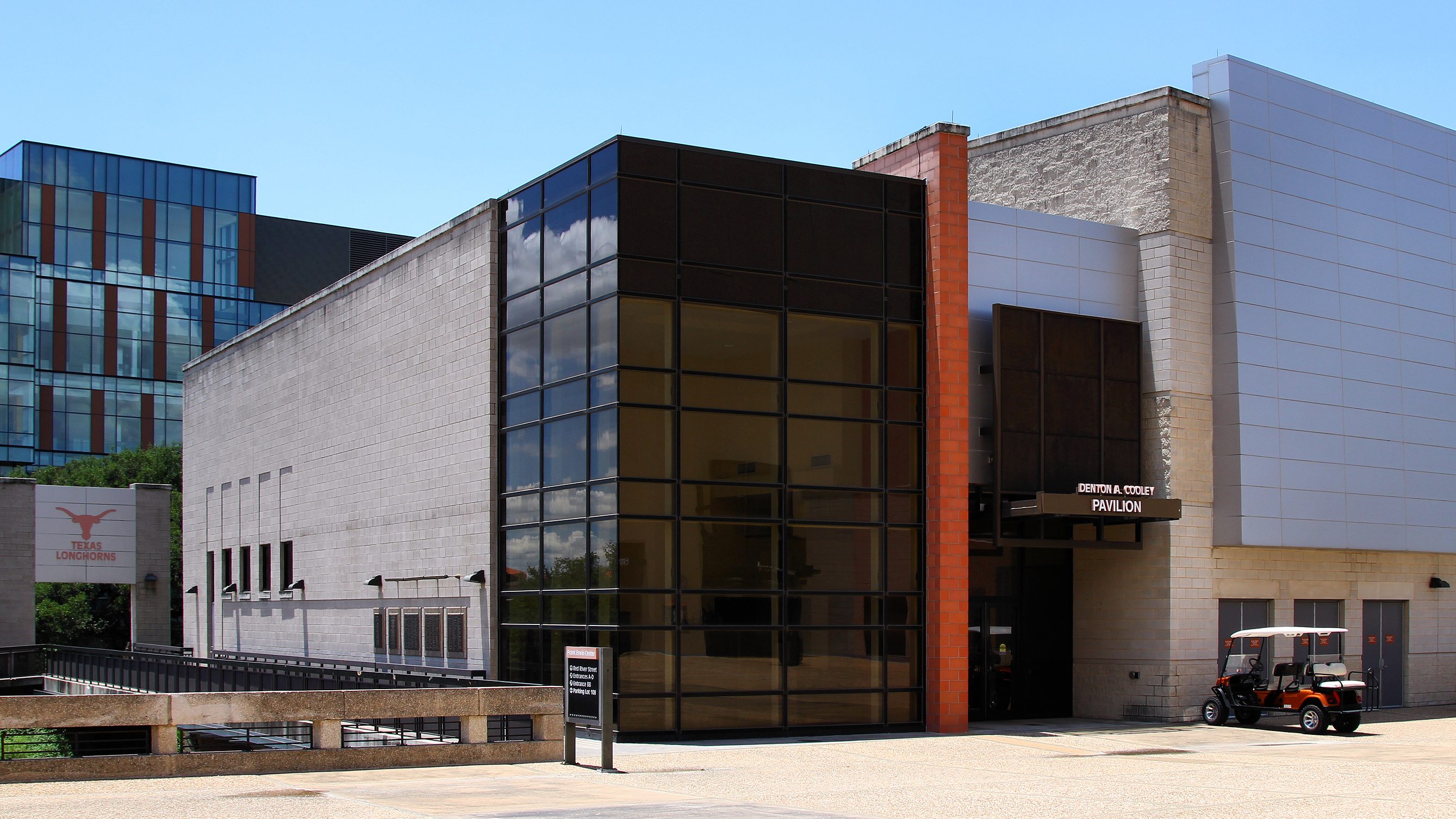
Entrance to the Denton A. Cooley Pavilion

The Denton A. Cooley Pavilion (or Cooley Pavilion) was the practice and training facility serving the men's and women's basketball teams of The University of Texas at Austin. The facility was named for Dr. Denton A. Cooley, a UT alumnus, basketball letterman (1939–41), and pioneering heart surgeon.

The Cooley Pavilion opened in the fall of 2003. The two-level, 44,000-square-foot facility was constructed adjacent to the Erwin Center, the multipurpose, on-campus arena that serves as the home court for the Longhorn basketball teams. The Texas men's and women's teams have separate 9,000-square-foot practice court areas, each consisting of one full-court and one half-court practice area with seven basket stations. The practice facility also includes a locker room with a players' lounge, an instructional film theater, a 4,100-square-foot strength and conditioning area, an athletic training and hydrotherapy area, an academic resource and activity center, and a coaches' lounge and locker room.

The master plan released in 2013 for the University's new Dell Medical School indicated that the Cooley Pavilion and Erwin Center would be demolished in a later phase of construction within six to fifteen years.

Ultimately, UT announced plans to build a new basketball arena, to be named Moody Center, that is scheduled to open in 2022. Current plans call for Cooley Pavilion to be replaced by a new practice facility located next to Moody Center.
