= Beverly Kearney =

American college track and field coach, NCAA championship coach

Biographical details
- Born: 25 February 1958 (age 68)

Playing career
- 1979–1981: Auburn
- Position: Sprinter

Coaching career (HC unless noted)

Track and field
- 1981–1982: Indiana State (Grad. Asst.)
- 1982–1984: Toledo
- 1984–1986: Tennessee (Asst.)
- 1987–1992: Florida
- 1993–2013: Texas

Accomplishments and honors

Championships
- 4 NCAA Women's Indoor Track & Field (1992, 1998, 1999, 2006); 3 NCAA Women's Outdoor Track & Field (1998, 1999, 2005)

Awards
- 3× USTFCCCA Outdoor Coach of the Year (1997, 1998, 2005); 3× USTFCCCA Indoor Coach of the Year (1992, 1999, 2006)

Beverly Kearney (born 25 February 1958) is an American former college track and field coach. From 1993 to 2013, Kearney was the head coach of the Texas Longhorns women's track and field and cross country teams at The University of Texas at Austin; she held the position until her resignation on January 5, 2013. Kearney guided the Lady Longhorns to six NCAA Championships: Indoor Championships in 1998, 1999, and 2006, and Outdoor Championships in 1998, 1999, and 2005.

== Early life ==
Kearney's mother died when she was 17. She later was homeless and worked multiple jobs to support herself. Kearney was a standout student-athlete and began her track and field career at Hillsborough Community College where she earned National Junior College All-America honors. She then earned a scholarship to Auburn University where she claimed two AIAW All-America honors and was selected the Auburn Athlete of the Year and team MVP as a senior. In 1980, Kearney qualified for the U.S. Olympic Trials in the 200-meter before closing out her career at Auburn in 1981 and earning a bachelor's degree in social work. She graduated in 1982 with a master's degree in physical education from Indiana State University, where she began her coaching career in track and field.

== Coaching career ==
University of Texas coaching highlights

- Six NCAA Championships
- Three-time NCAA Outdoor Champions (1998, 1999, 2005)
- Three-time NCAA Indoor Champions (1998, 1999, 2006)
- 14 top-three team finishes at NCAA's
- Three-time NCAA Outdoor Coach of the Year (1997, 1998, 2005)
- Two-time NCAA Indoor Coach of the Year (1999, 2006)
- 15-time Conference Coach of the Year

=== Resignation from Texas ===
On January 5, 2013, Kearney resigned as women's track coach at the University of Texas after revealing that she had engaged in an "intimate consensual relationship" with a student athlete and member of the track and field team. The former athlete notified Texas officials about the relationship in October 2012, and Texas placed Kearney on leave in November 2012 while an investigation took place. After confirming the relationship, UT officials decided that Kearney could not continue in her position and informed her that she could either resign or be fired. School officials maintained that any romantic relationship between a player and a coach is unacceptable.

Kearney and her attorney, Derek Howard, told the Austin American-Statesman that she did not know she was required to inform the women's athletic director about any relationship she had with one of her players. While Kearney admitted displaying poor judgement, Howard issued a statement asserting that male coaches have engaged in similar conduct and have not been punished, in particular football coach Major Applewhite, who had an extramarital affair with a graduate assistant athletic trainer. Applewhite's only punishment was a salary freeze for 11 months of 2009. He was given a $9,000 raise in 2010. Patti Ohlendorf, UT Austin's vice president for legal affairs, noted in comments to CNN that the distinguishing feature of Kearney's conduct was her position as a head coach and the status of the directly subordinate student-athlete, saying that the relationship "crosses the line of trust placed in the head coach for all aspects of the athletic program and in the best interests of the student-athletes in the program."

== Auto accident ==
On December 26, 2002, Kearney was a passenger in an SUV that flipped over several times, throwing her about 50 feet from the car. The accident left Kearney paralyzed from the waist down. Two friends died on the scene including Ilrey Oliver Sparks, a 40-year-old academic counselor at UT and a former Jamaican Olympic track star, and Muriel Wallace, the mother of the driver. Three passengers survived including: Kearney; the driver, Michelle Freeman, a former Jamaican track and field athlete and Olympic bronze medalist; and Sparks's two-year-old daughter, Imani Sparks. When paramedics found Kearney on the pavement, she was barely breathing. Her spinal cord was badly injured, a chunk of her back had been ripped out, her skull was fractured, and she was bruised all over.

When doctors explained to Kearney that she was paralyzed, she vowed to walk again. She underwent multiple major surgeries and months of rehabilitation and physical therapy. She first stood on her own four months after the car accident in front of a crowd of 20,000 cheering people in the Mike A. Myers Stadium during the 2003 Texas Relays. Within a year of the accident, she moved from using a wheelchair to using a walker, and a year later was using two canes. After a couple of years, she switched to one cane to keep her balance.

== Philanthropy ==
In 2006, Kearney founded the Pursuit of Dreams (POD) Foundation a 501(c)(3) nonprofit organization committed to reconnecting and assisting individuals with their life’s purpose, passions, and dreams. POD uses proven sports-based “coaching” methods and principles in a broader setting to strengthen individuals and communities. Each spring during the Texas Relays weekend the organization hosts a symposium and networking conference for teaching, inspiring and mentoring student-athletes and the entire community. The purpose of the event is to bring together a distinguished group of minorities with credentials from the entertainment, sports and music industries coupled with highly profiled individuals from academia, political and Corporate America to provide minority students with insight on making a transition into the corporate world.

== Awards and accolades ==
- 2012 - The BET Honors Education Award for achievements and accomplishments as a coach and mentor.
- 2011 - Selected as one of the 2011 faces for Oil of Olay’s “Positive Role Models In Our Community” Promo.
- 2011 - Women of Distinction Honoree by Girl Scouts of Central Texas - Austin area
- 2009 - Named one of "50 Women on a Mission" and Women Who Are Changing the World by Woman's Day magazine.
- 2008 - Auburn University, Lifetime Achievement Award
- 2004 - Inducted into the International Women's Sports Hall of Fame
