= Edrick Floréal =

Haitian coach & athlete (born 1966)

Current position
- Title: Head coach
- Team: Texas Men’s and Texas Women's
- Conference: Big 12

Biographical details
- Born: October 5, 1966 (age 60); Gonaïves, Haiti
- Education: Arkansas
Medal record
Men's athletics
Representing Canada
Commonwealth Games
Bronze medal – third place	1990 Auckland	Triple jump

Edrick Bertholan Floréal (born October 5, 1966) is a track and field coach for the Texas Longhorns men's track and field and women's track and field program and retired long and triple jumper from Canada.

== Career ==
=== Athletics career ===
Floréal finished fourth in the triple jump at the 1987 Pan American Games. He represented Canada at two consecutive Summer Olympics, starting in 1988. At the 1988 Summer Olympics, he finished 18th in the qualifying round of the Triple Jump; at the 1992 Summer Olympics, he finished 28th in the qualifying round in the Long Jump. He is the former Canadian record holder in the long jump and current Canadian record holder in the triple jump, with marks of 8.20 m (26 ft 10 3/4 in) and 17.29 m (56 ft 8 1/2 in).

Floréal competed collegiately for the University of Arkansas, a school fabled for its jumping prowess. He won the NCAA Men's Indoor Track and Field Championships triple jump in both 1989 and 1990 and at the Outdoor Championships in 1988, 1989 and 1990.

=== Coaching career ===
Floréal was the director of track and field at Stanford University from 1998 to 2012. He was named the "West Regional Coach of the Year" for the 2010 indoor season by the United States Track & Field and Cross Country Coaches Association (USTFCCCA).

Floréal was signed as the head coach of the University of Kentucky men and women's cross country and track teams on July 9, 2012.

Floréal was named Head Track and Field Coach at the University of Texas in June 2018. There, he won the men's NCAA Division I Indoor Championship in 2022 and the women's NCAA Division I Outdoor Championship in 2023.

== Personal life ==
Floréal is married to LaVonna Martin-Floreal, the 1992 Olympic silver medalist in the 100-meter hurdles. They have two children, one of whom, E.J., played three seasons for the Kentucky Wildcats men's basketball team before leaving the program in August 2016 to join the University of Kentucky track program full-time.

== International competitions ==
Year	Competition	Venue	Position	Event	Notes
1985	Universiade	Kobe, Japan	13th (q)	Long jump	7.66 m
1985	Universiade	Kobe, Japan	19th (q)	Triple jump	15.67 m
1986	Commonwealth Games	Edinburgh, United Kingdom	6th	Long jump	7.50 m
1986	Commonwealth Games	Edinburgh, United Kingdom	8th	Triple jump	15.58 m
1987	Universiade	Zagreb, Yugoslavia	8th	Triple jump	16.36 m
1987	Pan American Games	Indianapolis, United States	4th	Triple jump	16.55 m
1987	World Championships	Rome, Italy	21st (q)	Triple jump	16.33 m
1988	Olympic Games	Seoul, South Korea	18th	Triple jump	16.11 m
1989	Jeux de la Francophonie	Casablanca, Morocco	1st	Long jump	7.84 m
1989	Jeux de la Francophonie	Casablanca, Morocco	3rd	Triple jump	16.69 m
1989	Universiade	Duisburg, West Germany	17th (q)	Triple jump	15.99 m
1990	Commonwealth Games	Auckland, New Zealand	3rd	Triple jump	16.89 m
1990	Goodwill Games	Seattle, United States	6th	Triple jump	16.64 m
1991	World Championships	Tokyo, Japan	15th	Long jump	7.95 m
1991	World Championships	Tokyo, Japan	17th	Triple jump	16.68 m
1992	Olympic Games	Barcelona, Spain	28th	Long jump	7.62 m
1993	World Championships	Stuttgart, Germany	19th (q)	Long jump	7.39 m
1993	World Championships	Stuttgart, Germany	16th (q)	Triple jump	16.84 m
1994	Jeux de la Francophonie	Paris, France	1st	Triple jump	16.83 m
1994	Commonwealth Games	Victoria, Canada	5th	Triple jump	16.61 m
1995	World Indoor Championships	Barcelona, Spain	—	Triple jump	NM
