= Oregon Ducks track and field =

Intercollegiate track and field team of for the University of Oregon

- University: University of Oregon
- Head coach: Jerry Schumacher
- Conference: Big Ten
- Location: Eugene, Oregon, US
- Outdoor track: Hayward Field
- Nickname: Ducks
- Colors: Green and yellow

NCAA Indoor National Championships
- Men's: 2009, 2014, 2015, 2016, 2021; Women's: 2010, 2011, 2012, 2013, 2014, 2016, 2017, 2025

NCAA Outdoor National Championships
- Men's: 1962, 1964, 1965, 1970, 1984, 2014, 2015; Women's: 1985, 2015, 2017 Cross Country: Men's: 1971, 1973, 1974, 1977, 2007, 2008; Women's: 1983, 1987, 2012, 2016

Conference Outdoor Championships
- Men's: 1924, 1934, 1965, 1967, 1978, 1979, 1986, 1990, 2003, 2005, 2007, 2008, 2009, 2010, 2011, 2012, 2013, 2014, 2015, 2016, 2017, 2018, 2019, 2021, 2022; Women's: 1983, 1984, 1985, 1986, 1991, 1992, 2009, 2010, 2011, 2012, 2013, 2014, 2015, 2016, 2017, 2022, 2023, 2024 Cross Country: Men's: 1969, 1970, 1973, 1976, 1977, 1978, 1979, 1982, 1988, 1989, 1990, 1992, 1995, 2006, 2007, 2008, 2025; Women's: 1976, 1977, 1978, 1979, 1980, 1982, 1983, 1984, 1985, 1986, 1987, 1988, 1990, 1991, 1992, 1995, 2012, 2014, 2018, 2024, 2025

The Oregon Ducks track and field program is the intercollegiate track and field team for the University of Oregon located in the U.S. state of Oregon. The team competes at the NCAA Division I level and was a member of the Pac-12 Conference until 2024 when they joined the Big Ten Conference. The team participates in indoor and outdoor track and field as well as cross country. Known as the Ducks, Oregon's first track and field team was fielded in 1895. The team holds its home meets at Hayward Field in Eugene, Oregon. Jerry Schumacher is the current head coach and since the program's inception in 1895, there have only been eight permanent head coaches. The Ducks claim 33 NCAA National Championships among the three disciplines.

Due to its rich heritage, the home of the Ducks is popularly dubbed as Tracktown, USA. Four of the head coaches in Oregon's history have been inducted into the USTFCCCA Hall of Fame. Several people involved with the program have developed innovative coaching strategies and helped restructure amateur athletics. Alumni of the program have continued to the Olympics and professional ranks while some others have founded athletic corporations like Nike and SPARQ.

Oregon's track and field history has been documented in two major motion films Without Limits and Prefontaine as well as the books Bowerman and the Men of Oregon and Pre: The Story of America's Greatest Running Legend. Former coaches and alumni have also written a number of books on running instruction for both top end athletes and hobbyists.

== History ==
=== Early history ===
The first track team was established in 1895 with head coach Joseph Wetherbee. This coach remained for only one year and the following four coaches, W.O. Trine, J.C. Higgins, C.A. Redmond, and William Ray, also remained for extremely short durations. With such sporadic coaching changes, the Oregon track and field team struggled with inconsistencies, although the university did win six of seven meets in 1895.

=== Under Coach Bill Hayward ===
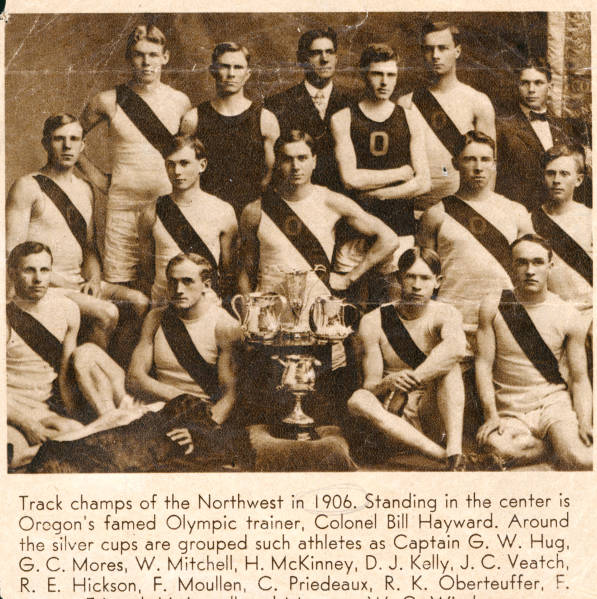
1906 Oregon Ducks track and field team

The modern era of Oregon track and field began in 1903. The Webfoots (as they were called at the time) lost a track meet to Albany College (now Lewis & Clark College). Oregon promptly asked Albany's coach, Bill Hayward, to come to Eugene as track coach for the following season. Hayward's career at Oregon was long and illustrious, lasting 44 years. His athletes included nine Olympians and produced five world records. By 1919, his standing at Oregon was such that when a new stadium was constructed for the football team, it was named Hayward Field for him. Two years later, a track was added and track meets were transferred there from nearby Kincaid Field.

=== Under Coach Bill Bowerman ===
Bill Bowerman's involvement with Oregon dated to his student days in the 1930s. He initially played football when he arrived in Eugene. Coach Bill Hayward, who Bowerman credits with teaching him how to run, convinced Bowerman to run track. Bowerman graduated from Oregon in 1934 with a degree in business.

After his service in World War II, Bowerman was hired by Oregon to replace the retiring Hayward after John Warren's single year as interim head coach. Though Bowerman's title was head coach, he considered himself more of a teacher than a coach. He stressed schoolwork over athletics and urged his pupils to apply the values they learned participating in track and field to everyday life. During his time at Oregon, he brought four NCAA team championships to the university and coached 33 Olympians as well as 24 individual NCAA champions. He coached some of the world's best distance runners including Steve Prefontaine.

Bowerman retired from coaching in 1972. While at Oregon, he also coached the USA Track and Field team and helped bring the U.S. Olympic Trials to Hayward Field for the first time. In 2009, The Bowerman Award was created in coach Bowerman's name and administered by the U.S. Track & Field and Cross Country Coaches Association. The award is given annually as the highest honor for the best collegiate track and field athlete of the year, one each for men and for women.

==== Steve Prefontaine ====
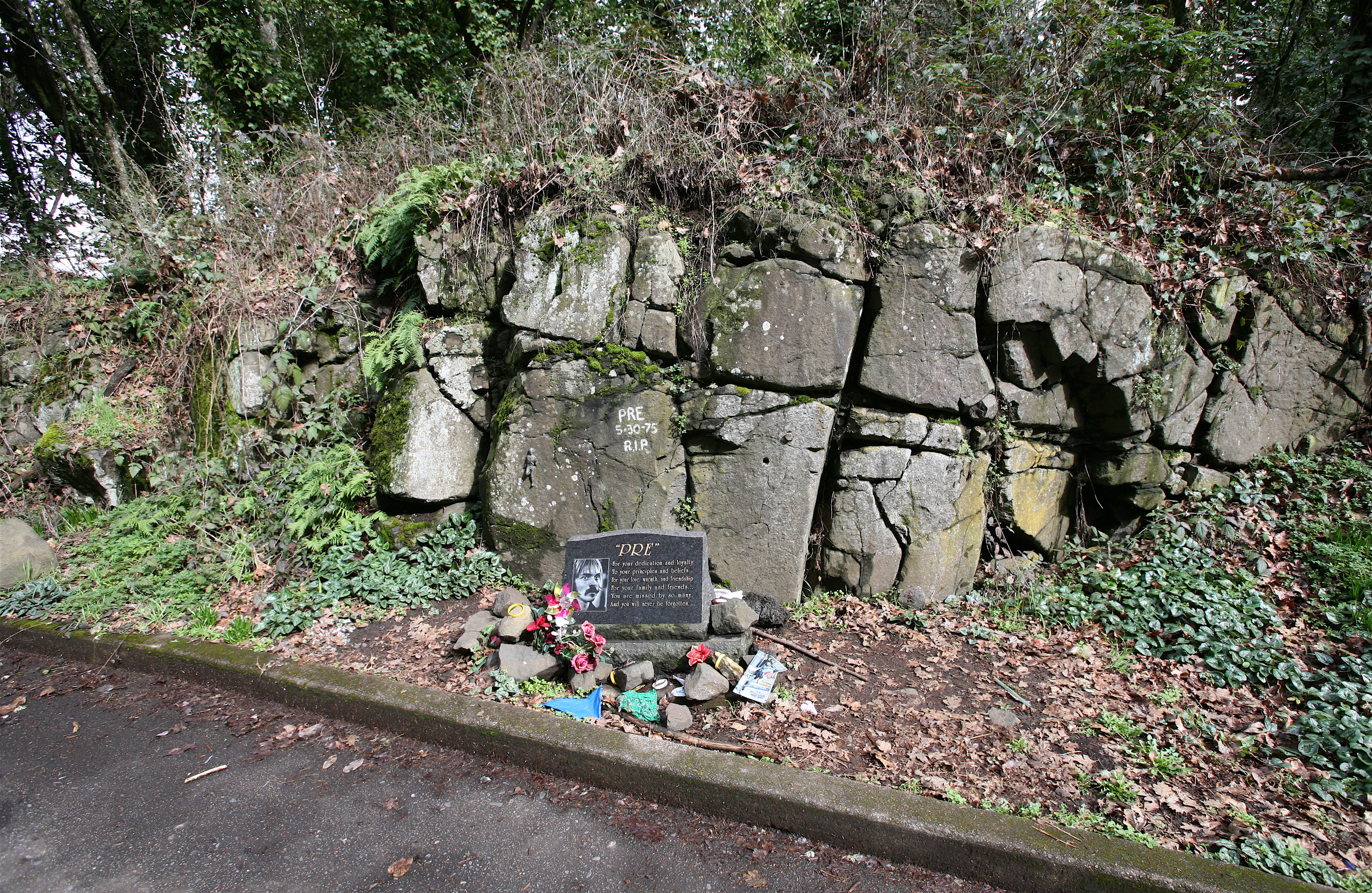
Pre's Rock; the memorial marker at the location of Prefontaine's death

Steve Prefontaine arrived on campus in 1969 and immediately, head coach Bowerman and assistant coach Bill Dellinger had their hands full to rein in the rebellious new athlete. The bold running style of Prefontaine, front-running, was a strategy that altered the pace of the sport. At one point, Prefontaine held every American distance record above the 2,000 meters and was thought of by many to be one of the greatest American runners in history. Prefontaine had never lost a race longer than a mile during his collegiate career and won a total of seven NCAA championships in track and field and cross country. He raced in the 5000m at the 1972 Olympics in Munich, placing fourth in the race. He died in an automobile accident in Eugene in 1975, at the peak of his career.

His accomplishments were not confined to the track. He was deeply resentful toward the treatment given toward amateur athletes. He had frequently butted heads with the Amateur Athletic Union, calling the AAU a corrupt organization. His opinions played a major role in the passing of the Amateur Sports Act of 1978, legislation providing legal protection to amateur athletes.

Prefontaine, coupled with Frank Shorter's success running the marathon, is often credited with playing a role in the running boom in America in the 1970s. His legacy lives on in two movies documenting his life, Without Limits and Prefontaine, as well as the Prefontaine Classic, an annual track meet held at Hayward Field in his honor.

==== Nike ====
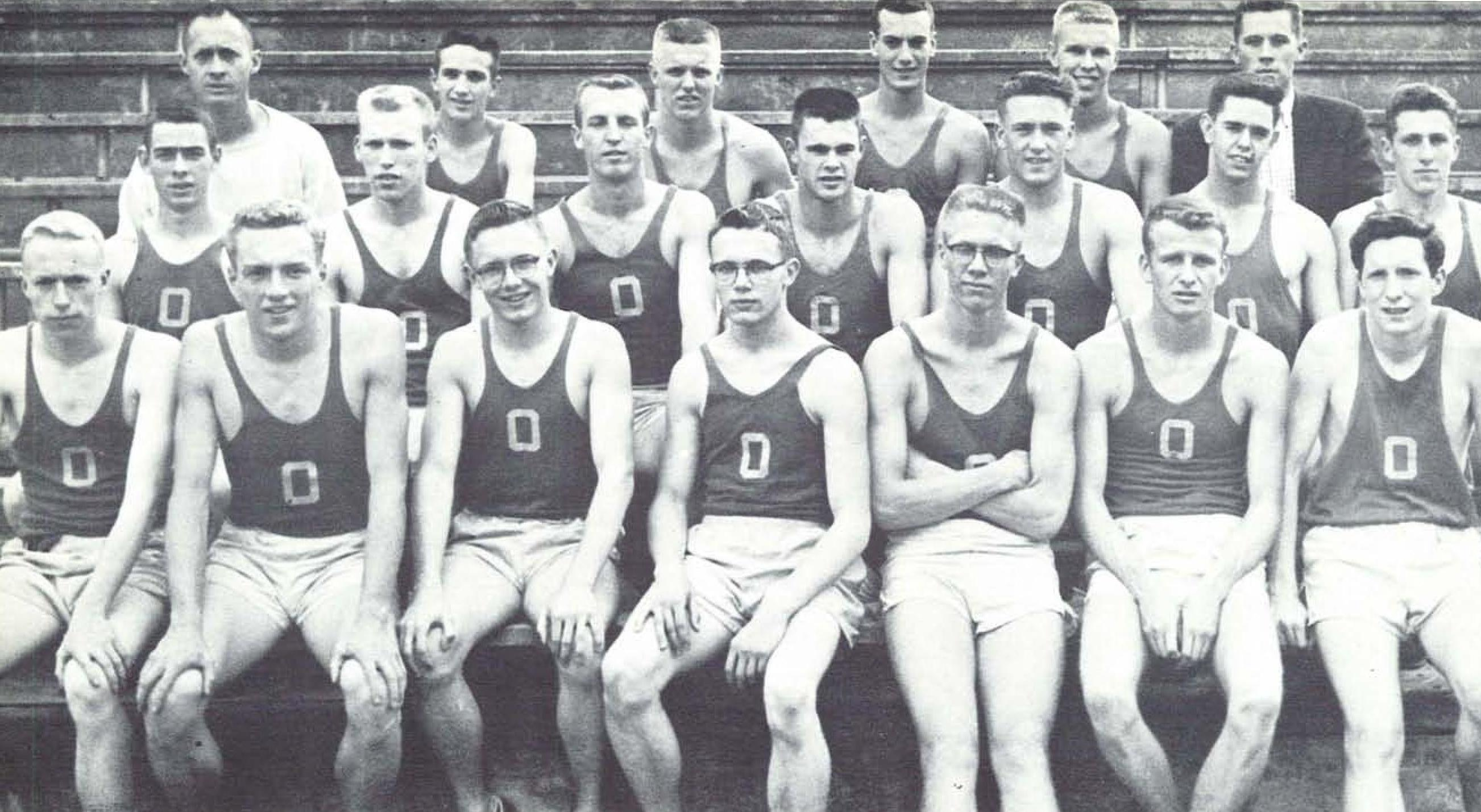
The 1957 freshman track and field team; Phil Knight is seated at the very left in the front row.

Another one of Bowerman's pupils, Phil Knight, partnered with Bowerman and revolutionized the sport with the formation of the shoe company giant, Nike. Knight graduated from the University of Oregon in 1959 and went on to Stanford University for graduate school. There, he developed the idea to import Japanese running shoes to the American market. After earning his MBA from Stanford, he returned to the University of Oregon where he and Bowerman struck a handshake deal in 1964, each with a $500 investment into a company called Blue Ribbon Sports to import Japanese running shoes. In the late 1960s, Bowerman's pursuit of lighter shoes for his athletes led him to develop a sole by pouring rubber into his wife's waffle iron, inventing the modern running shoe. After Knight decided to rename the company Nike and develop its own shoes, Bowerman's invention became the prototype for the company. The shoe made its debut in the 1972 Olympic Trials at Hayward Field with Steve Prefontaine as one of the early endorsers. Although Bowerman retired from coaching in 1972, he remained on Nike's board until 1999. In that time, Nike exploded into a multibillion-dollar company.

=== Under Coaches Bill Dellinger and Tom Heinonen ===
Like his predecessor, Bill Dellinger's involvement with the University of Oregon began before his coaching career. He lettered in track at the university, graduating in 1956 and won a Bronze medal in the 1964 Summer Olympics. After his athletic career, he joined Bowerman's staff in 1967 as an assistant coach where he helped coach Steve Prefontaine. He took over as head coach in 1973 after Bowerman's retirement. With Dellinger at the helm, Oregon's Cross Country team brought home four NCAA national championships and the track and field team brought home one NCAA national championship. He retired in 1998. The Bill Dellinger Invitational is an annual cross country race held by the University of Oregon in honor of the coach.

Hired as a physical education graduate student in 1975, Tom Heinonen, was promoted to the head coach for the women's cross country and track and field team in 1977. Prior to Heinonen, no other full-time head coach at Oregon had exclusively coached the women's disciplines. He was a strong advocate for women's sports and was a force in making the Oregon Twilight Meet a co-ed event. Women's cross country and track and field blossomed under Heinonen's leadership. He led the women's team to win its first three NCAA team championships and coached 14 NCAA individual champions. He produced 134 All-Americans and his athletes made 17 appearances in the Olympics. He retired in 2003, after which the University of Oregon Athletic Department decided to combine the men's and women's programs under one head coach.

=== Under Coach Vin Lananna ===
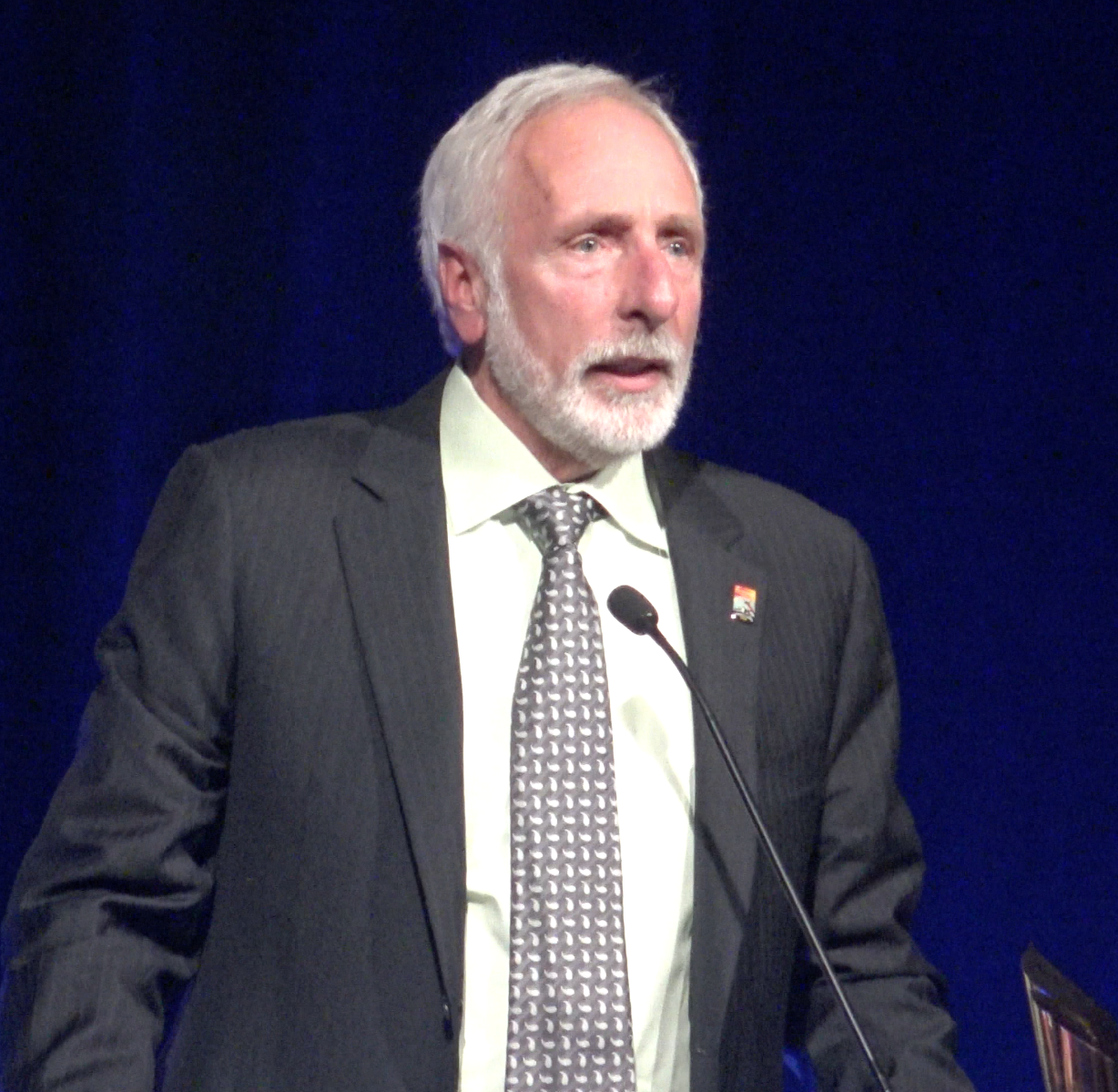
Vin Lananna at the 2015 USATF Convention

In 2005, Vin Lananna was hired to become the track and field head coach, replacing Martin Smith who resigned after the previous season. Lananna was already a decorated head coach from Stanford with five NCAA national championships under his belt. At Oregon, he led seven teams to win NCAA national championships, including the first indoor national championships in school history. He also attracted the Olympic Trials, the NCAA Track and Field Championships, and the USA Track and Field Championships to Eugene for multiple years.

Just prior to the 2012 season, Robert Johnson was promoted to the head coaching position as Lananna moved to an administrative position with the program.

=== Under Coach Robert Johnson ===
Robert Johnson was Vin Lanana's first hire, originally to lead throws, hurdles, and sprints, then in 2009, was named the associate head coach for women's track. The University of Oregon was historically known for its rich tradition in distance running but had never been known for sprinting. Robert Johnson drastically transformed this during his tenure.

By 2011, the year before Johnson took over as head coach, every women's sprint school record for distances still actively run, for both outdoor and indoor track and field, had been broken. The women's indoor program won its first NCAA title in 2010 and by 2017, had won seven of the previous eight indoor national championships. In the 2017 indoor national championship, the sprinters excelled as the women's program set a record for points scored at 84, exceeding the previous record set by Texas by 13 points. The sprinters were so dominant that despite Deajah Stevens's lane violation in the 200m prelims erasing a collegiate record time run in the final, the points accrued from Oregon women's sprinters alone would have been only two points shy of runner up Georgia's entire points total.

Several months later, the Oregon's women's program entered the NCAA Outdoor National Championship meet as favorites to win the title. Despite losing a key runner to injury, a disqualification in the 4 × 100 m, and adversity during the meet, the Oregon women's team was able to edge out the Georgia Bulldogs's strong field events team in the final 4 × 400 m event. Since the women's team won the cross country championship and the indoor championship in the same academic year, the outdoor title gave the women's team a triple crown, the first time any NCAA women's track and field team has accomplished this feat.

In 2021, allegations surfaced of body shaming within the program, resulting in unhealthy disorders among several athletes. Johnson defended the use of certain technologies such as DEXA scans, that monitor bone density and body fat, saying they take human bias out of the equation. In 2022, a few weeks before the World Athletics Championships, held at Hayward Field, it was announced that the University of Oregon would not renew Johnson's contract, but there were no specific reasons given for doing so. Not long after, the university announced the hire of the Bowerman Track Club coach, Jerry Schumacher, as the next head coach.

=== Under Jerry Schumacher ===
The hiring of Jerry Schumacher, a successful distance running coach of the Nike-sponsored Bowerman Track Club, signaled a desire to return to its roots in distance running. Schumacher would continue to coach Bowerman Track Club athletes on top of the university's head coaching duties, with the entirety of the track club moving south from Portland to Eugene. Shalane Flanagan, who coached with Schumacher at Bowerman Track Club and an accomplished runner, joined the coaching staff as well as highly acclaimed throws coach Brian Blutreich, a two-time National Assistant Coach of the Year.

With the conference realignment of Oregon leaving the Pac-12 and joining the Big 10 for the 2024-2025 season, Oregon dove headfirst into the top of the conference with a 2024 Women's Cross Country Conference Championship with the men's team third, both Men's and Women's Indoor Track and Field Conference Championship, and the Men's Outdoor Track and Field Conference Championship with the Women's team the runner up. The Ducks' track and field teams had been tapering off the national spotlight under coach Johnson's later years, shedding athletes at an alarming rate, with the last dynastic national championship in 2017 and a single 2021 Men's National Championship for Indoors. In three years of Schumacher's coaching, he earned his first NCAA National Championship for the Ducks in 2025, for Women's Indoors.

== Impact on running ==
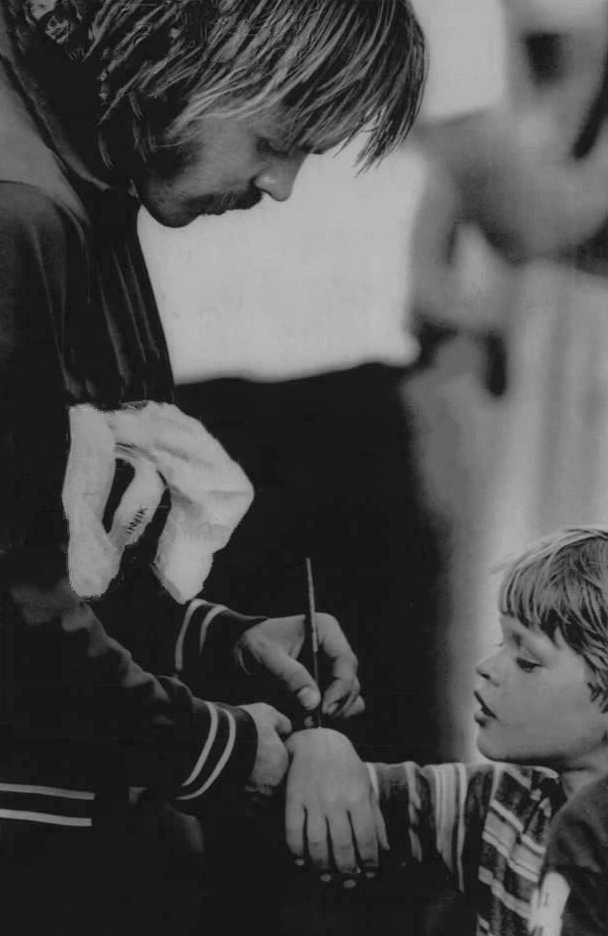
Steve Prefontaine, signing an autograph.

The people involved in the Oregon track and field program have led changes that benefited professional athletes and coaches, as well as running enthusiasts. Bill Bowerman experimented with many coaching techniques during his time as a head coach at the University of Oregon and instilled many of his principles from his days as a Major in the US Army. For example, Bowerman pioneered in using film as a method of teaching technique to his athletes. With Bowerman's meticulous attention to details, he made other discoveries with regards to coaching track. The training schedules he developed for his athletes ran counter to many other coaches' principles at the time. He believed that each individual athlete was different and tailored different workout routines to different athletes. He also scaled his workouts up and down, giving some of his athletes rest on certain days for recovery time. This attention to detail also led him to become obsessed with experimentation of reducing the weight of his athletes' apparel and increasing the traction of their shoes which eventually led to the creation of the apparel company Nike. Moreover, Bowerman considered himself more of a teacher than a coach and stressed schoolwork as well as mentoring his athletes with regards to life. Tom Heinonen, the former head coach of the Oregon women's track and field program was a strong advocate of female athletics at a time when female athletics were largely an afterthought. Steve Prefontaine was vehemently outspoken against the Amateur Athletic Union. Kenny Moore, a former University of Oregon student who ran track under Bowerman, was one of the speakers at the President's Commission on Olympic Sports, a series of hearings regarding amateur sports. These efforts along with those from other amateur athletes eventually culminated in the passage of the Amateur Sports Act of 1978.

Bowerman and his athletes' philosophy and stories were documented by Kenny Moore. Moore wrote the book Bowerman and the Men of Oregon and practiced journalism, most notably for Sports Illustrated. He also was the screenwriter with Robert Towne for Without Limits, a movie that told the story of Prefontaine and Bowerman. In addition, he was also an actor in Personal Best, a movie with track and field as one of the central themes. Bowerman himself wrote several books on the sport of running including High Performance Training for Track and Field which details coaching instruction for high level competition. He also wrote a book with a cardiologist called Jogging, which detailed the medical benefits of jogging, to which many credited its exploding popularity. Bowerman's successor, Bill Dellinger, also authored a number of books regarding running, including Competitive Runner's Training Book, The Running Experience and Winning Running.

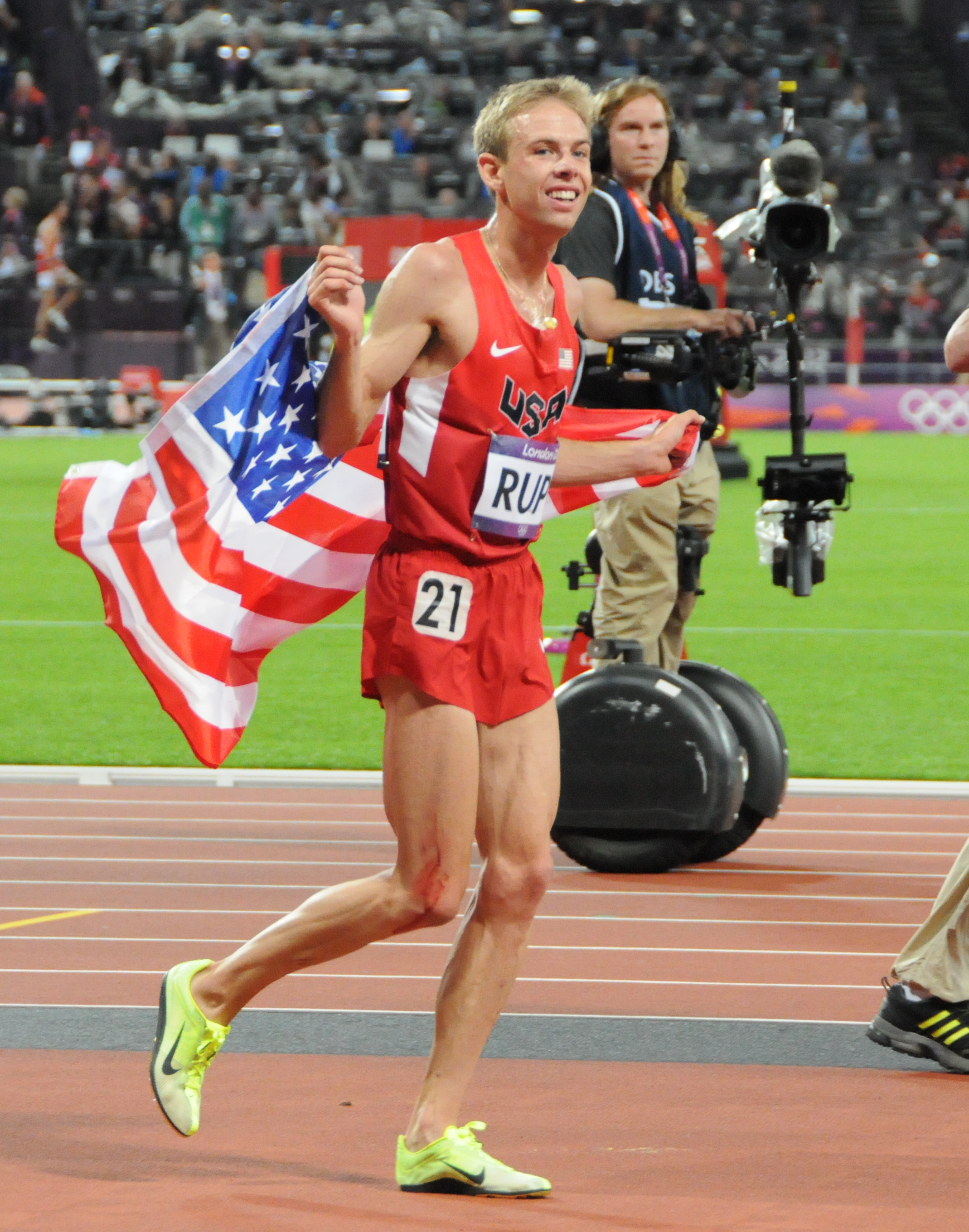
Galen Rupp, coached by Alberto Salazar, celebrating his 2012 Olympic silver medal in the 10k.

The program's coaching extended beyond just within the program itself. Bowerman had his athletes mentor the community and continued to be active in the sport after his retirement. He was also a coach for the US Olympic team in 1972 and an assistant coach in 1968 US Olympic Team. Bill Dellinger coached the distance runners in the 1984 Olympic Games. After Dellinger retired from the University of Oregon, he continued to coach running on a consulting basis despite suffering through a stroke. Tom Heinonen remained a running coach after his retirement at the volunteer level for the University of Oregon Running Club. Matt Centrowitz, another University of Oregon alumnus and father of Matthew, took the American University track and field program to prominence since the rebirth of the program in 1999. Alumnus Alberto Salazar became a noted marathon coach after his running days under the employ of Nike. Salazar used controversial coaching tactics like tweaking runners' natural running form, but had coached many athletes to the apex of their careers. He launched an experimental training program called the Nike Oregon Project financed by Nike with the purpose of integrating African runners' training conditions into American training mixed with modern technology. He also discovered similarities in running posture between sprinters and top level distance runners, two disciplines previously thought to be exceedingly different. Instilling some of these methods into American runners, he was able to coach Kara Goucher to a third-place finish in the Boston Marathon in 2009, an event that East Africans typically dominate. Mo Farah and alumnus Galen Rupp were training partners under Salazar and finished first and second respectively in the 2012 Summer Olympics in the 10k. Rupp was the first American to medal in the 10k since Billy Mills in 1964 and the first medalist not born in Africa since 1988. Also running for Salazar and the Oregon Project, alumnus Matthew Centrowitz Jr. won a gold medal in the 2016 Summer Olympics, the first American to win gold in the 1,500m since Mel Sheppard in 1908, ending a 108-year drought. Similar to his collegiate coaches, Salazar wrote a pair of books about distance running. Alberto Salazar was handed a lifetime ban from the sport in July 2021 over allegations of sexual and physical abuse, which Salazar denies. There was no criminal trial over these allegations, nor was he criminally charged.

== Venues ==
Kincaid Field

The early teams ran at Kincaid Field, constructed in 1902 as an athletic field. In 1919, Hayward Field was constructed for football events and two years later, a track was installed around the field as the track and field team moved in. Kincaid field was torn down in 1922.

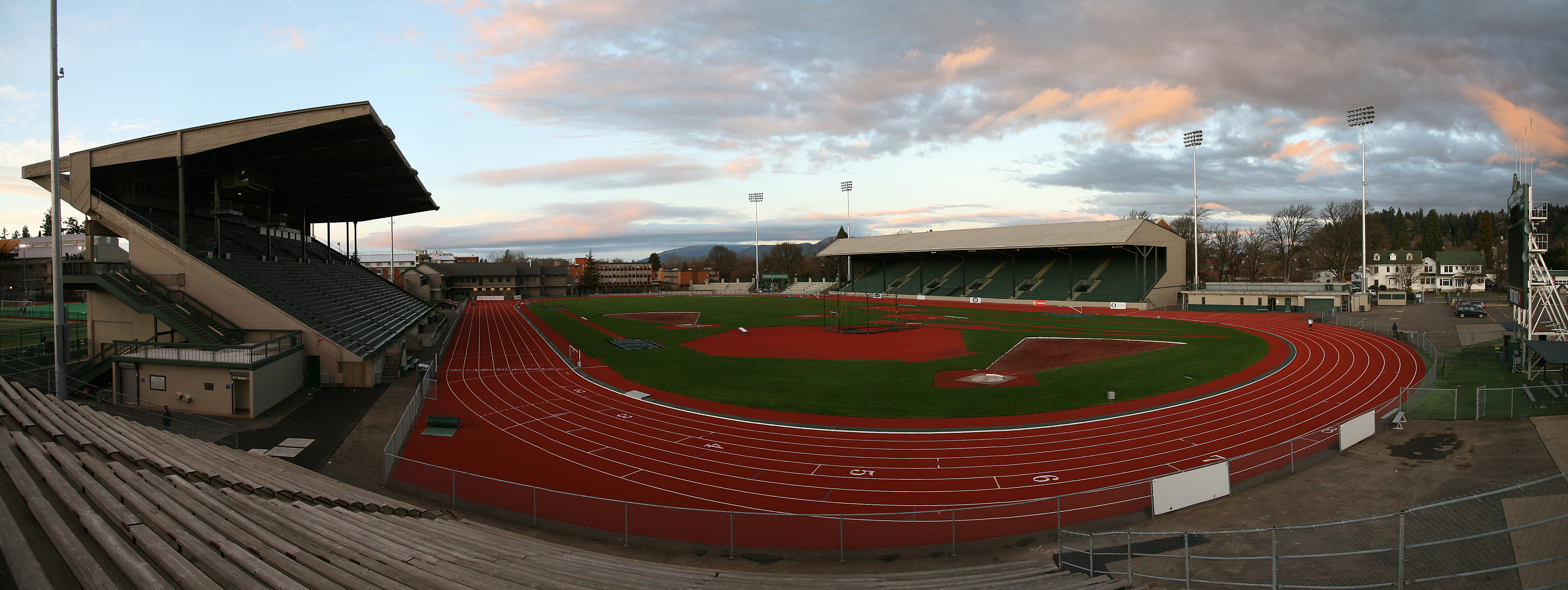
Hayward Field

Autzen Stadium was opened in 1967 and the football team moved out of Hayward Field. At that point, Hayward Field became exclusively a track and field stadium. The venue had undergone significant upgrades since then including the Bowerman Building in 1992, the Powell Plaza in 2005, an indoor facilities upgrade in 2006, and new equipment in 2007.

Hayward Field has been host to numerous national track and field events such as the U.S. Olympic Trials, NCAA Championships, and the USA Track and Field Championships. No other venue has hosted more NCAA Championships and no other venue had held three consecutive U.S. Olympic Trials. Many have attested to the magical aura of Hayward field, citing many personal bests run at the venue. Credit often goes to the regular attendance of knowledgeable track and field fans for the phenomenon.

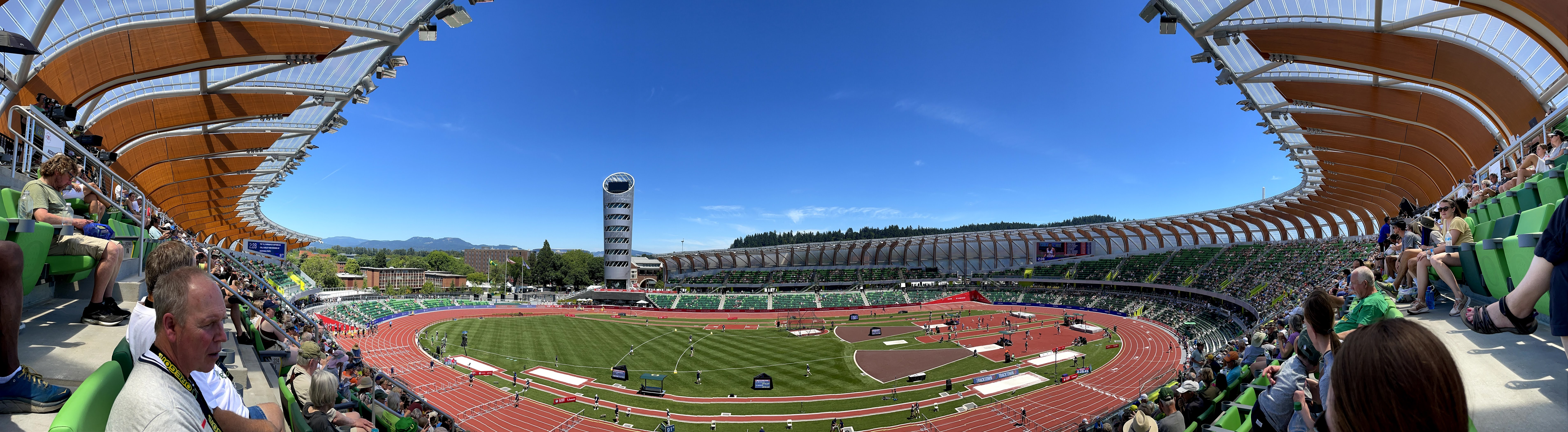
Renovated Hayward Field

In 2015, Eugene was selected to host the 2021 World Athletics Championships at Hayward Field. This was the first time that the prestigious track and field event was held in the United States, since the inception of the biannual event in 1983.

Following the announcement of hosting the World Championships, plans began to renovate Hayward Field to meet the specifications of the IAAF. In a highly controversial decision, Hayward Field was completely redesigned, including knocking down the iconic east grandstand. In spring of 2020, the Hayward Field renovations were complete and several meets took place, including the NCAA Track and Field Championships. Although the new stadium was constructed for the 2021 World Championships, the event was postponed to 2022 in response to the COVID-19 pandemic.

The new Hayward Field, funded by Phil and Penny Knight along with over 50 other donors, expanded the seating capacity from 10,500 to 12,650, although temporary seating was expandable to almost 25,000. A glass and wood canopy circles the stadium and the seats were designed to be as close to the track as possible. A tower on the northeast corner evokes an Olympic torch, clad with the images of five Oregon track legends Bill Bowerman, Steve Prefontaine, Raevyn Rogers, Ashton Eaton, and Otis Davis.

== Rivalries ==
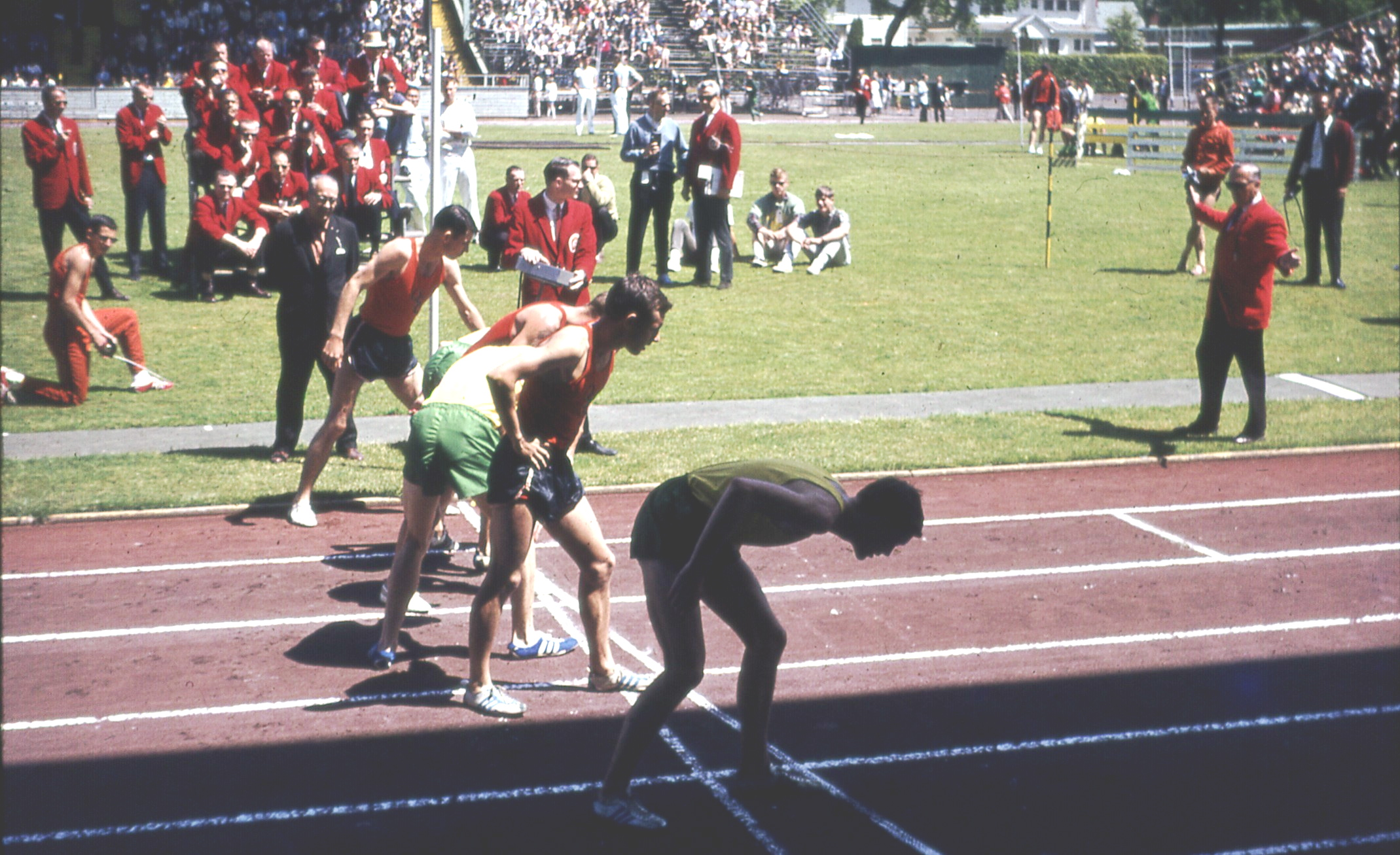
1966 dual meet between Oregon and Oregon State

A traditional rival of the Oregon Ducks was the Oregon State Beavers. This rivalry extended to the track and field programs, where for a period, they met twice a year. However, due to budgetary concerns, Oregon State University dropped the track and field program in 1988 and the rivalry ended. Their women's program was reinstated in 2004, but since they do not have a men's program, the rivalry has not been renewed.

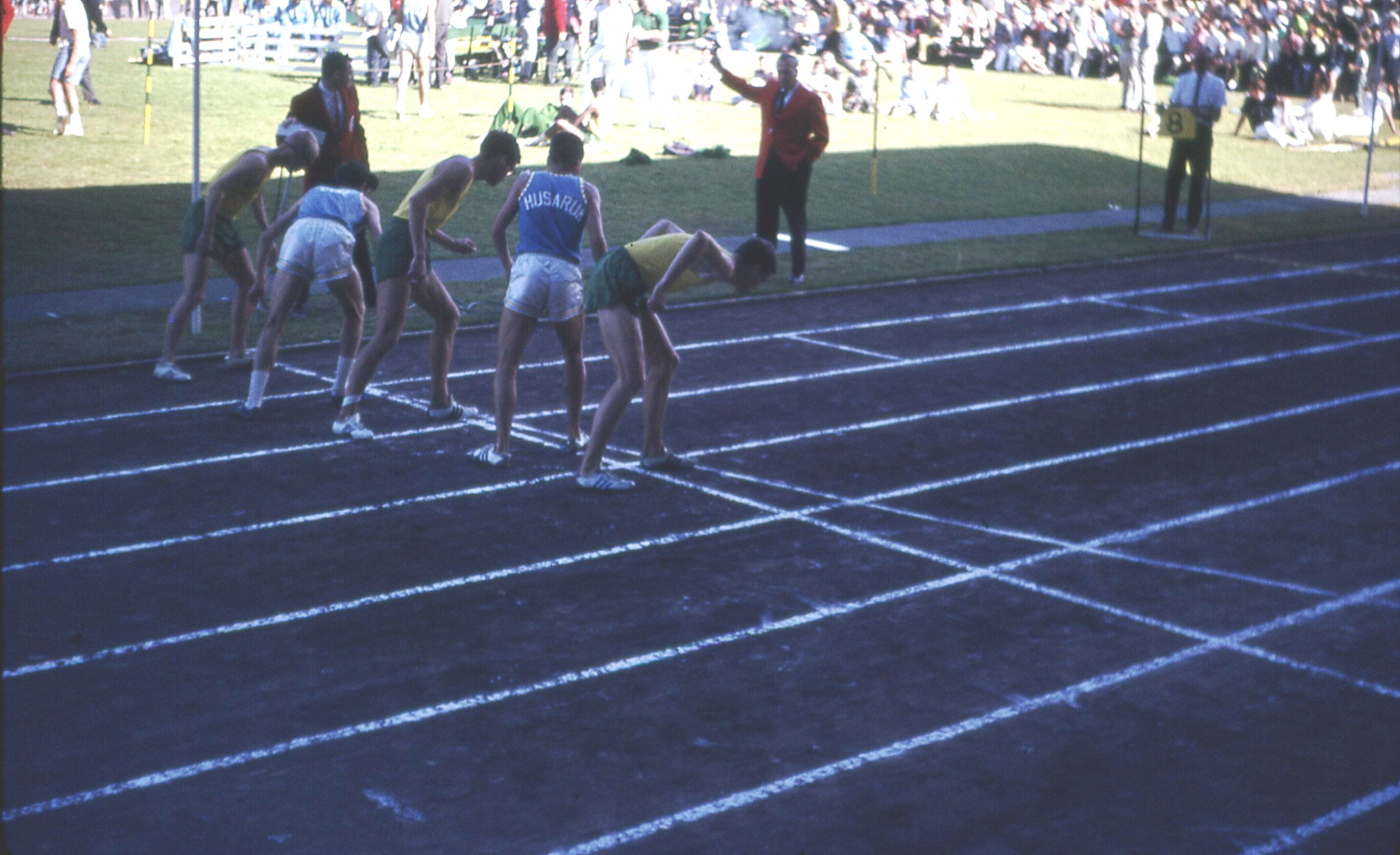
1966 dual meet between Oregon and UCLA

The UCLA Bruins became an Oregon rival in track and field as the two powerhouse programs battled each other in a series of dual meets. Oregon's program was ranked in the top 3 nationally in dual meets by Track & Field News thirteen times between 1970 and 1996 and was ranked No. 1 three times. The UCLA squad achieved a No. 1 ranking from the same publication eleven times within the same time frame. In 1966, the two programs met head to head for the first time. The Bruins displayed their dominance at the dual meet and won nine straight against the Ducks. Oregon head coach Bill Bowerman in 1971 called the Bruins team the best dual meet team in the country. It wasn't until 1978 that Oregon earned its first victory in the series, which ended UCLA's 34 dual meet winning streak. Oregon won the next three meets and the series ended in 1985 with a UCLA win. The dual meet event was fading out of favor in collegiate track and field and the Oregon-UCLA dual meet was discontinued with UCLA holding the advantage over the Ducks 10–4. In 1994, the Pepsi Team Invitational which included Oregon, UCLA and Washington was scored as a dual meet, which UCLA won. In 2008, the dual meet series between the two schools restarted and Oregon won the first three meets. Although the location of the meet had alternated between Eugene and Los Angeles between 1966 and 1976, subsequent meets have been held at Hayward Field in Oregon until 2011 where the two teams battled to a tie at UCLA. The dual meet was discontinued in 2012 due to scheduling difficulties in an Olympic year and had not been renewed since.

== Head coaches ==
Prior to Bill Hayward in 1904, four coaches led the Oregon track and field teams for just one year including Joseph W. Wetherbee (1895), J.C. Higgins (1897), C.A. Redmond (1902), and William Ray (1903). John Warren was the interim head coach in 1948 before Bill Bowerman took over for Bill Hayward. In a similar fashion to the men's team, three head coaches led the women's team on a part-time basis including Lois Youngen (1972), Ron Brinkert (1973–1974), and Rob Ritson (1975–1976) before Tom Heinonen arrived to provide consistency at the helm. The following coaches are a chronology of Oregon track and field head coaches that served for terms greater than two years:

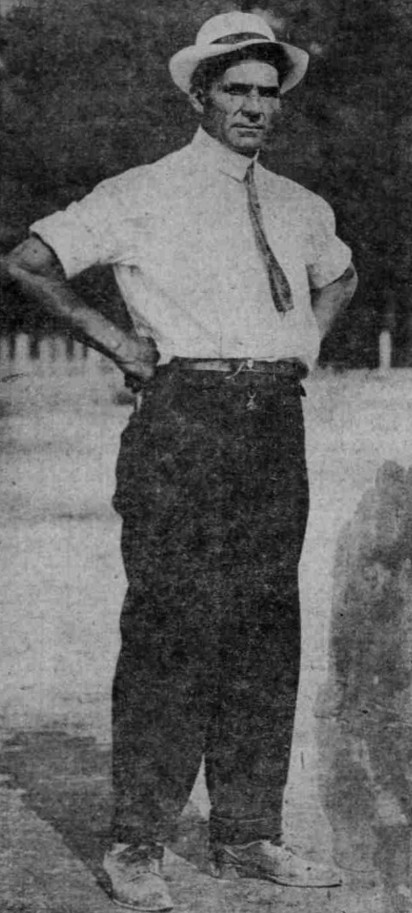
Head coach Bill Hayward

Coach	Term	NCAA team championships
W. O. Trine	1896, 1898–1901	N/A
Bill Hayward^{[a]}^{[c]}	1904–1947	0
Bill Bowerman^{[a]}^{[c]}	1949–1972	4
Bill Dellinger^{[a]}^{[c]}	1973–1998	5
Tom Heinonen^{[b]}^{[c]}	1977–2003	3
Martin Smith	1998–2005	0
Vin Lananna^{[a]}^{[c]}	2006–2012	6
Robert Johnson	2012–2022	14
Jerry Schumacher	2022–present	1

Notes:

- ^{[a]} Also coached on the US Olympic Team
- ^{[b]} Only coached the women's track and field and cross country team
- ^{[c]} Member of the USTFCCCA Hall of Fame

== Notable athletes ==
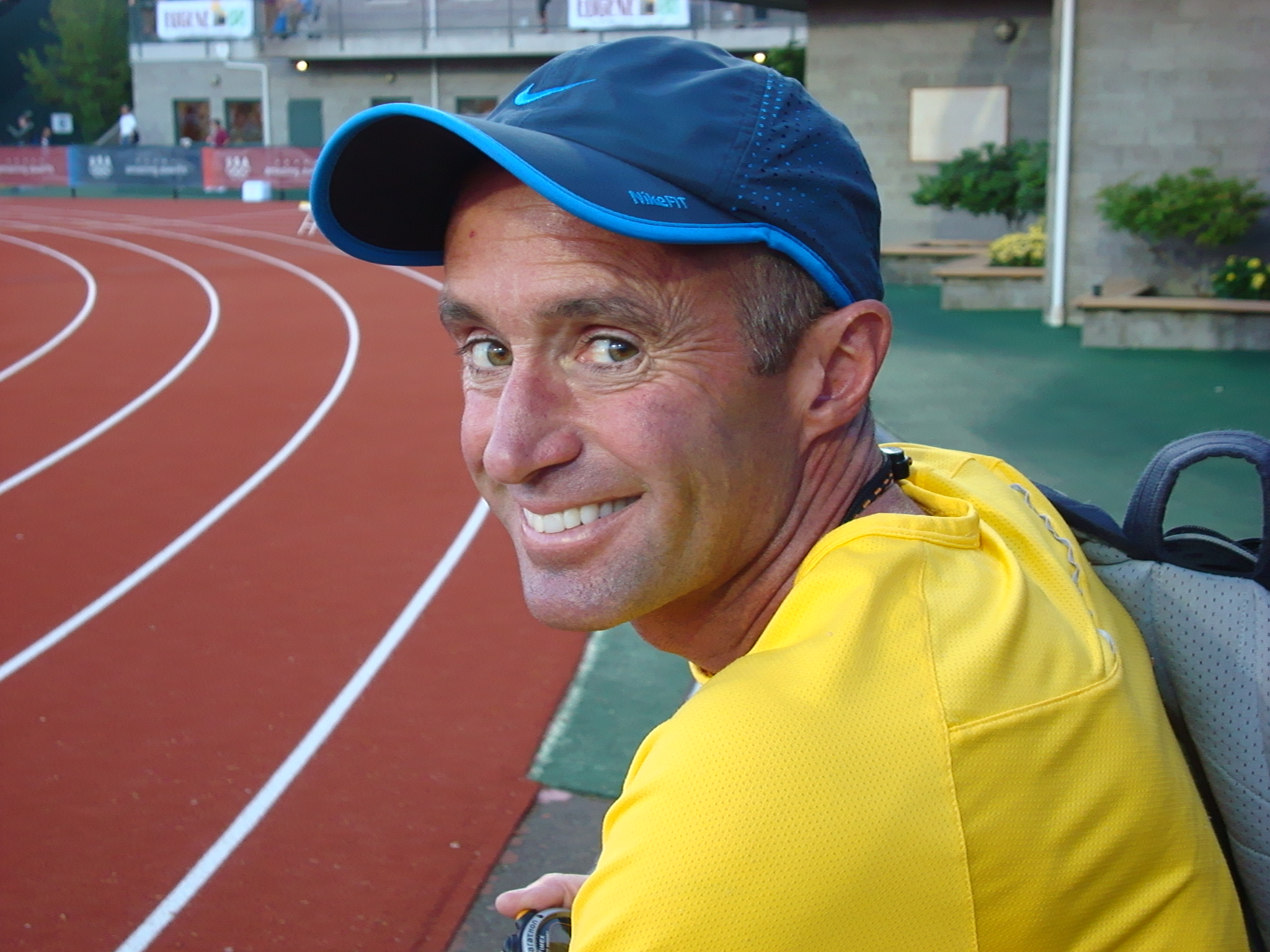
Alberto Salazar

The track and field program over the years has created dozens of NCAA individual champions and hundreds of All Americans. Alumni have gone on to medal in the Olympics, win big city marathons, and win national championships at the professional level.

Some of the most famed players from the program emerged from distance running. Steve Prefontaine held numerous American distance running records and never lost a collegiate distance running match. Alberto Salazar won three consecutive New York Marathons and added a Boston Marathon victory to the list.

Alumni have also had illustrious coaching careers. Bill Bowerman and Bill Dellinger both became Oregon coaches. Alberto Salazar and Terrence Mahon became distance running coaches after their running days. Others have found success related to track and field but not directly in the sport. Bill Bowerman and Phil Knight both co-founded Nike. Tinker Hatfield ran track at Oregon while studying architecture and later became a famous shoe designer for Nike. Rudy Chapa, a distance runner, founded SPARQ, an athletic equipment company.

There have been several members of the track and field team that lettered in other sports, particularly football. Mel Renfro is primarily known for being inducted into the Professional Football Hall of Fame but he also achieved a world record in the 440 yard relay in 1962 while running in the track and field program for Oregon. Jordan Kent, a former professional football player, was a rare three sport letterman in track, basketball, and football. The 2010 Doak Walker Award winner, LaMichael James, ran track during the football offseason. One of the first multi-sport athletes with the Oregon Ducks was the former head coach Bill Bowerman, who played football and ran track under Bill Hayward in both sports.

=== Olympians ===
Since Oregon's first Olympian, Dan Kelly, who finished second place in the broad jump of the 1908 Summer Olympics, at least one athlete from the University of Oregon has participated in each of the Summer Olympics since. This includes the 1980 Summer Olympics which the United States boycotted, when Chris Braithwaite competed for Trinidad, his native country.

Out of the scores of Olympians who attended the University of Oregon, the following have received medals:

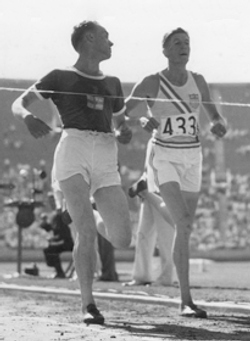
Ralph Hill (right) at the 1932 Olympics

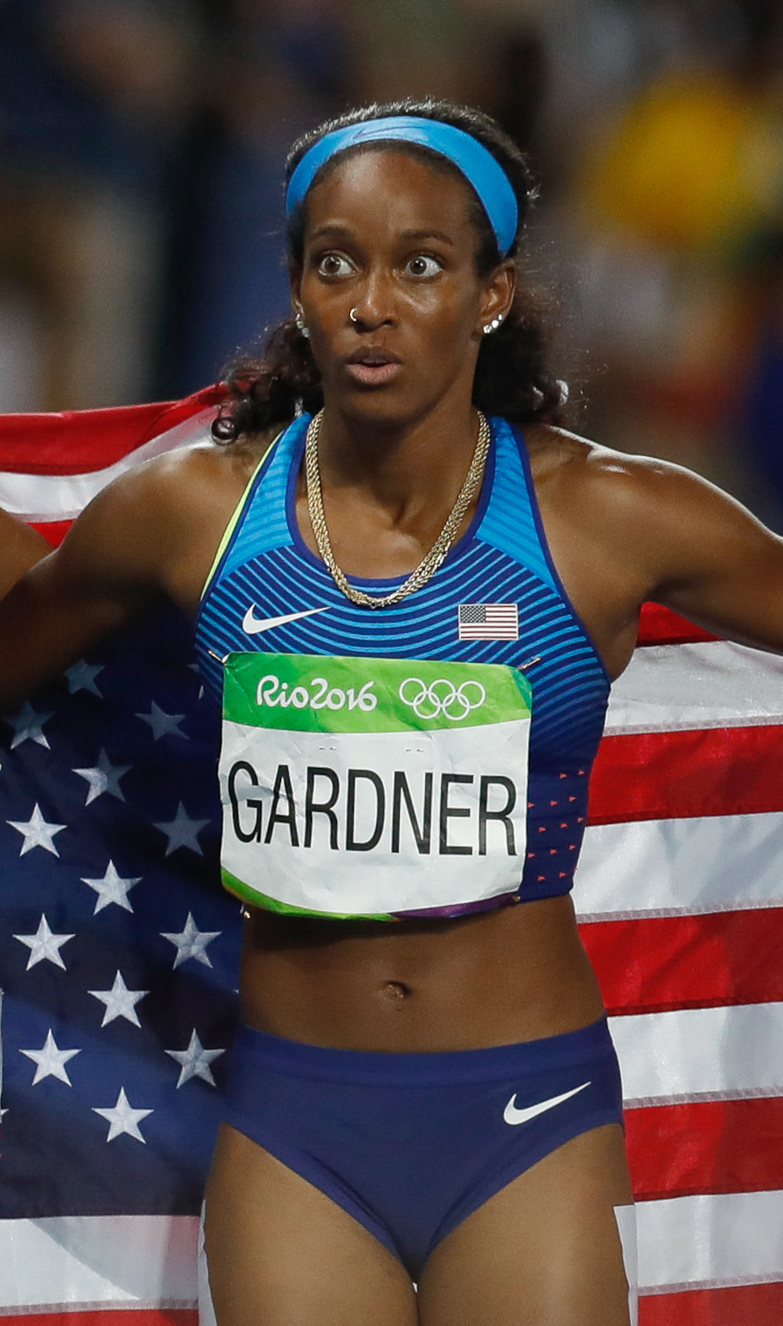
English Gardner at the Rio Olympics, after her 4×100 victory

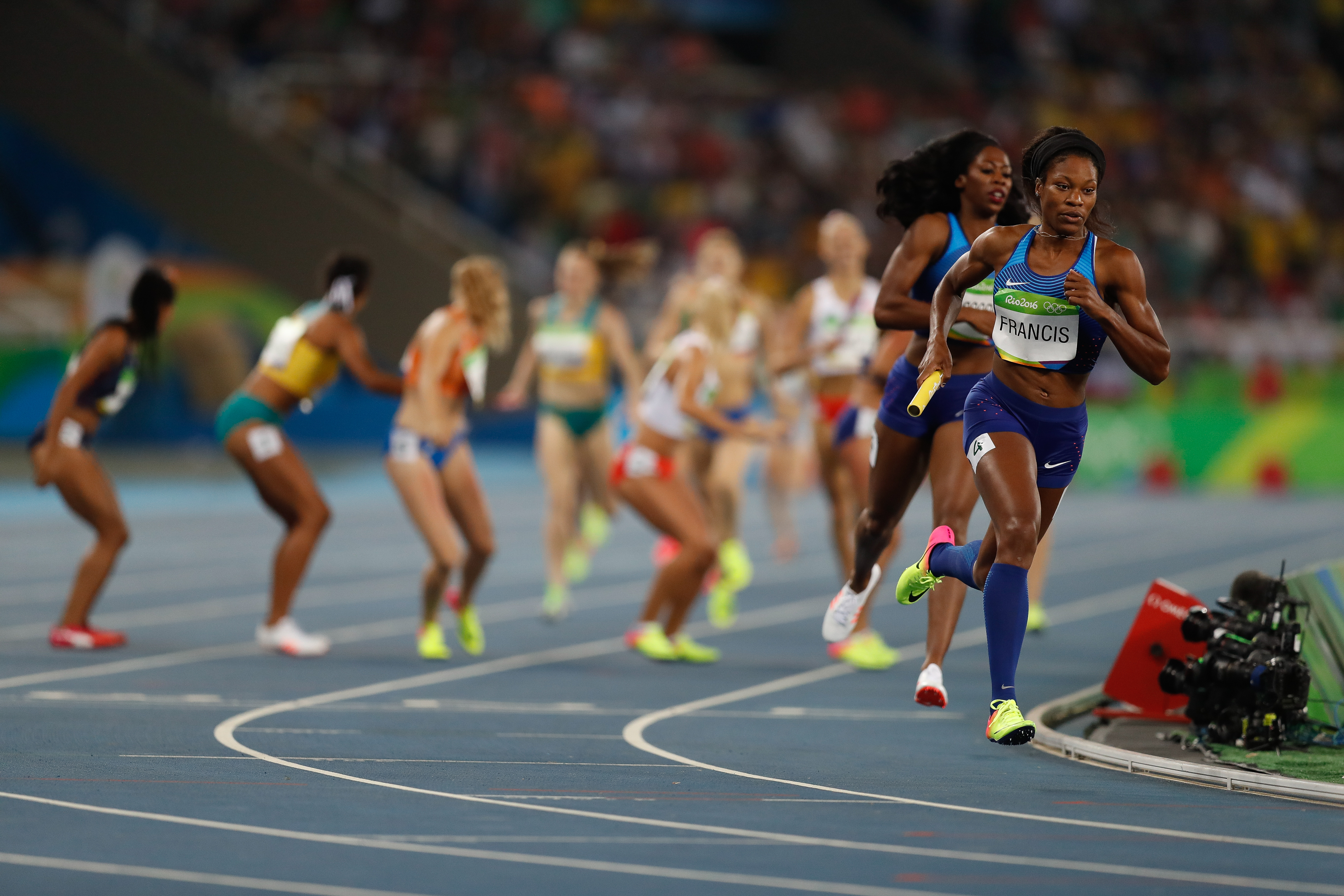
Phyllis Francis at the Rio Olympics, running the 4×400

Name	Country	Olympiad	Event	Result	Medal
Dan Kelly	United States	1908 London	Broad jump	23–3.25	Silver
Martin Hawkins	United States	1912 Stockholm	High hurdles	15.3	Bronze
Ralph Hill	United States	1932 Los Angeles	5,000 meters	14:30.0	Silver
Mack Robinson	United States	1936 Berlin	200 meters	21.1	Silver
Otis Davis	United States	1960 Rome	400 meters	45.07 (WR)	Gold
Otis Davis	United States	1960 Rome	4×400 meter relay	3:02.37 (WR)	Gold
Bill Dellinger	United States	1964 Tokyo	5,000 meters	13:49.8	Bronze
Harry Jerome	Canada	1964 Tokyo	100 meters	10.26	Bronze
Mac Wilkins	United States	1976 Montreal	Discus	221-5 (OR-q)	Gold
Joaquim Cruz	Brazil	1984 Los Angeles	800 meters	1:43.00 (OR)	Gold
Mac Wilkins	United States	1984 Los Angeles	Discus	217-6	Silver
Joaquim Cruz	Brazil	1988 Seoul	800 meters	1:43.90	Silver
Lisa Martin	Australia	1988 Seoul	Marathon	2:25.53	Silver
Keshia Baker	United States	2012 London	4×400 meter relay	3:16.99 (semis)	Gold
Ashton Eaton	United States	2012 London	Decathlon	8,869	Gold
Galen Rupp	United States	2012 London	10,000 meters	27:30.90	Silver
Matthew Centrowitz Jr.	United States	2016 Rio de Janeiro	1,500 meters	3:50.00	Gold
Ashton Eaton	United States	2016 Rio de Janeiro	Decathlon	8,893 (OR-t)	Gold
Phyllis Francis	United States	2016 Rio de Janeiro	4×400 meter relay	3:19.06	Gold
English Gardner	United States	2016 Rio de Janeiro	4×100 meter relay	41.01	Gold
Galen Rupp	United States	2016 Rio de Janeiro	Marathon	2:10.05	Bronze
Brianne Theisen-Eaton	Canada	2016 Rio de Janeiro	Heptathlon	6,653	Bronze
English Gardner	United States	2020 Tokyo	4×100 meter relay	41.90 (semis)	Silver
Jenna Prandini	United States	2020 Tokyo	4×100 meter relay	41.45	Silver
Raevyn Rogers	United States	2020 Tokyo	800 meters	1:56.81	Bronze
Cole Hocker	United States	2024 Paris	1,500 meters	3:27.65 (OR)	Gold
Jessica Hull	Australia	2024 Paris	1,500 meters	3:52.56	Silver

=== World Athletics Championships athletes ===
In the inaugural World Athletics Championships in 1983, Joaquim Cruz won a bronze medal in the 800 meters. Aside from a relay medal by Camara Jones in 1995, there have been no Ducks that medaled until 2011, after which a plurality of Ducks medaled in each subsequent meet until Budapest 2023. In 2022, the World Athletics Championship, delayed by a year due to the COVID-19 pandemic, was hosted at Hayward Field, the first time the meet was held on American soil. The Oregon track and field team members and alumni sent 15 athletes to the meet, but only two athletes, Jenna Prandini and Kemba Nelson, received medals, both in the Women's 4×100m event, although Devon Allen, one of the favorites to medal was disqualified in the 110-meter hurdles in a highly controversial incident where he started 0.099 seconds after the gun, just shy of the allowable 0.1 seconds of the reaction time.

The following are World Athletics Championships participants from the Oregon track and field team that have earned medals:

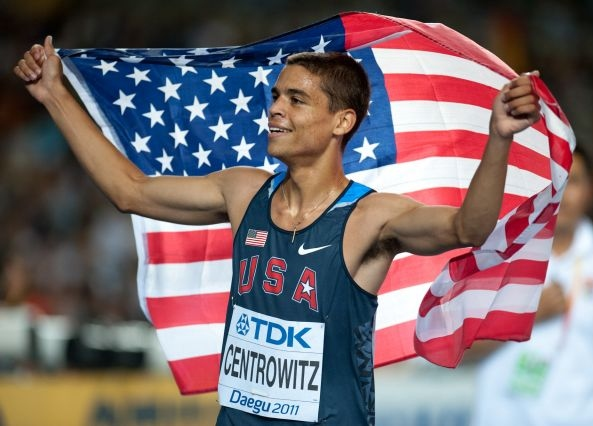
Matthew Centrowitz, 2011 in Daegu

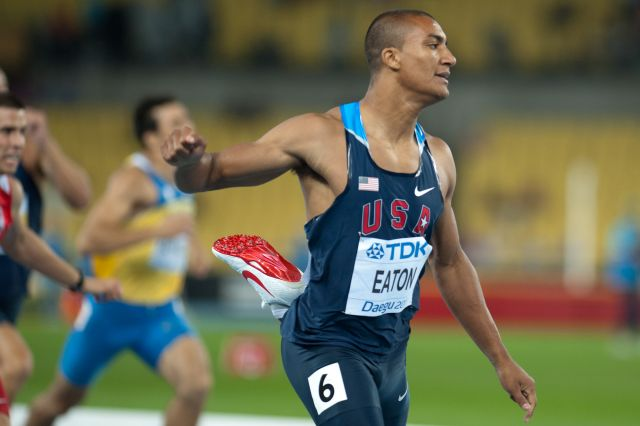
Ashton Eaton, 2011 in Daegu

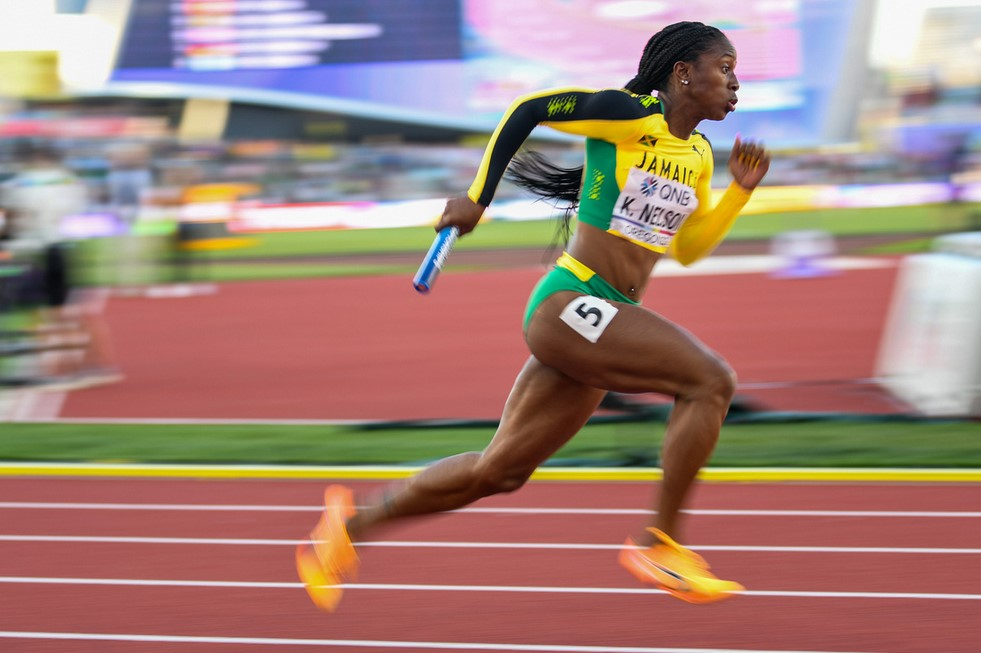
Kemba Nelson, 2022 in Eugene, running the first leg of the 4×100 final

Name	Country	Year	Event	Result	Medal
Joaquim Cruz	Brazil	1983 Helsinki	800 meters	1:44.27	Bronze
Camara Jones	United States	1995 Gothenburg	4×400 meter relay	3:22.29	Gold
Keshia Baker	United States	2011 Daegu	4×400 meter relay	(semis)	Gold
Michael Berry	United States	2011 Daegu	4×400 meter relay	(semis)	Gold
Matthew Centrowitz Jr.	United States	2011 Daegu	1,500 meters	3:36.08	Bronze
Ashton Eaton	United States	2011 Daegu	Decathlon	8505	Silver
Matthew Centrowitz Jr.	United States	2013 Moscow	1,500 meters	3:36.78	Silver
Ashton Eaton	United States	2013 Moscow	Decathlon	8809	Gold
English Gardner	United States	2013 Moscow	4×100 meter relay	42.75	Silver
Brianne Theisen-Eaton	Canada	2013 Moscow	Heptathlon	6530	Silver
Ashton Eaton	United States	2015 Beijing	Decathlon	9045 (WR)	Gold
Phyllis Francis	United States	2015 Beijing	4×400 meter relay	(semis)	Silver
English Gardner	United States	2015 Beijing	4×100 meter relay	41.68	Silver
Jenna Prandini	United States	2015 Beijing	4×100 meter relay	41.68	Silver
Brianne Theisen-Eaton	Canada	2015 Beijing	Heptathlon	6554	Silver
Phyllis Francis	United States	2017 London	400 meters	49.92	Gold
Phyllis Francis	United States	2017 London	4×400 meter relay	3:19.02	Gold
Ariana Washington	United States	2017 London	4×100 meter relay	(semis)	Gold
Phyllis Francis	United States	2019 Doha	4×400 meter relay	3:18.92	Gold
Cravon Gillespie	United States	2019 Doha	4×100 meter relay	(semis)	Gold
Raevyn Rogers	United States	2019 Doha	800 meters	1:58.18	Silver
Kemba Nelson	Jamaica	2022 Eugene	4×100 meter relay	41.18	Silver
Jenna Prandini	United States	2022 Eugene	4×100 meter relay	41.14	Gold
Jorinde van Klinken	Netherlands	2025 Tokyo	Discus	67.50	Silver
Jessica Hull	Australia	2025 Tokyo	1500 meters	3:55.16	Bronze
Cole Hocker	United States	2025 Tokyo	5000 meters	12:58.30	Gold

=== World record and world best holders ===
The following athletes from Oregon have achieved world records:

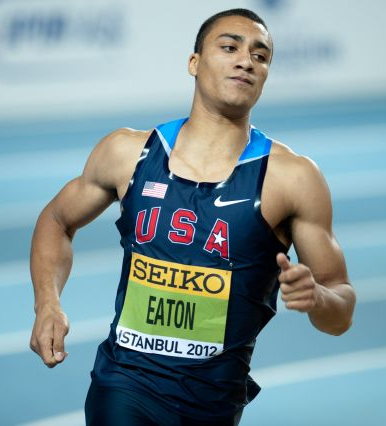
Ashton Eaton in Istanbul where he broke his own Heptathlon world record.

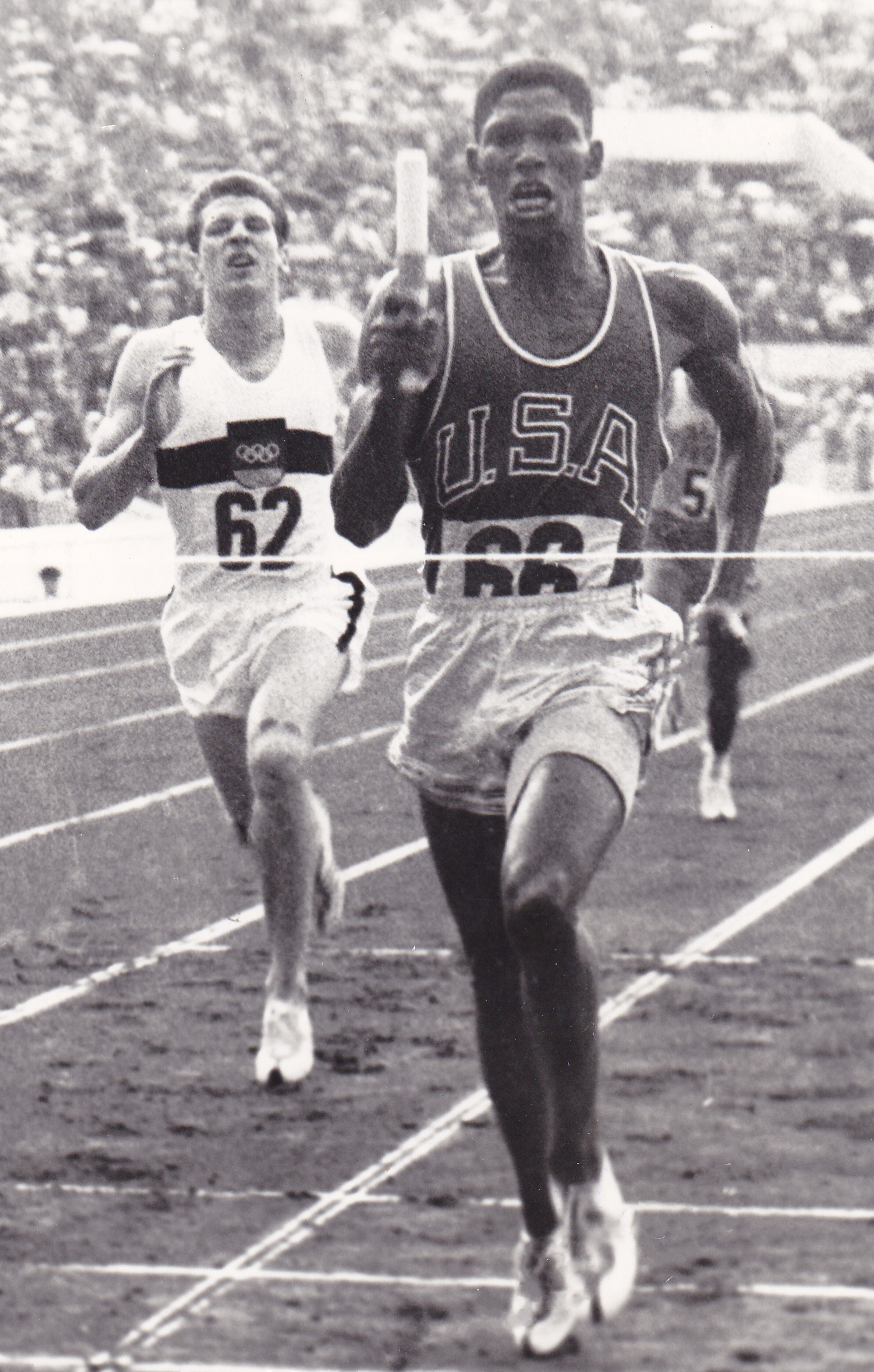
Otis Davis running the 4×400m in the Olympics in Rome.

Name	Year	Event	Record
Dan Kelly	1906	100 yards	9.6
Dan Kelly	1906	220 yards	21.1
Ed Moeller	1929	Discus	160–7.7
George Varoff	1936	Pole vault	14–6.5
Les Steers	1941	High jump	6–11
Bill Dellinger	1959	2-mile (indoor)	8:49.9
Bill Dellinger	1959	3-mile (indoor)	13:37.0
Roscoe Cook	1959	100 yards	9.3
Roscoe Cook	1959	60 yards (indoor)	6.0
Harry Jerome	1960	100m	10.0
Otis Davis	1960	400m	44.9
Otis Davis	1960	4×400 meter relay	3:02.37
Roscoe Cook	1961	60 yards (indoor)	6.0
Harry Jerome	1961	100 yards	9.3
Harry Jerome	1962	100 yards	9.2
Jerry Tarr, Mike Gaechter, Mel Renfro, Harry Jerome	1962	4×440 yard relay	40.0
Archie San Romani Jr, Vic Reeve, Keith Forman, Dyrol Burleson	1962	4 × mile relay	16:08.9
Neal Steinhauer	1967	Shot put (indoor)	67–10
Roscoe Divine, Wade Bell, Arne Kvalheim, Dave Wilborn	1968	4 × mile relay	16:05.0
Mac Wilkins	1976	Discus	232–6
Brian Crouser	1986	Javelin	262–0
Ashton Eaton	2010	Heptathlon (indoor)	6,499
Ashton Eaton	2011	Heptathlon (indoor)	6,568
Ashton Eaton	2012	Heptathlon (indoor)	6,645
Ashton Eaton	2012	Decathlon	9,039
Ashton Eaton	2015	Decathlon	9,045
Matthew Centrowitz Jr., Mike Berry	2015	Indoor Distance Medley Relay	9:19.93^{[a]}
Raevyn Rogers	2018	4×800 meter relay (indoor)	8:05.89
Edward Cheserek	2019	5000m (road)	13:29†^{[b]}
Cole Hocker, Luis Peralta, Charlie Hunter, Cooper Teare	2021	Indoor Distance Medley Relay	9:19.42^{[a]}
Raevyn Rogers	2022	Indoor Distance Medley Relay	10:39.91
Jessica Hull	2024	2000m	5:19.70

† Indicates tie
^{[a]} World best, but not an official world record since the IAAF did not keep a record of this event at the time the event occurred
^{[b]} Although an official world record, faster times were recorded outside of the period the IAAF logged world records in this event

=== Bowerman Award winners ===
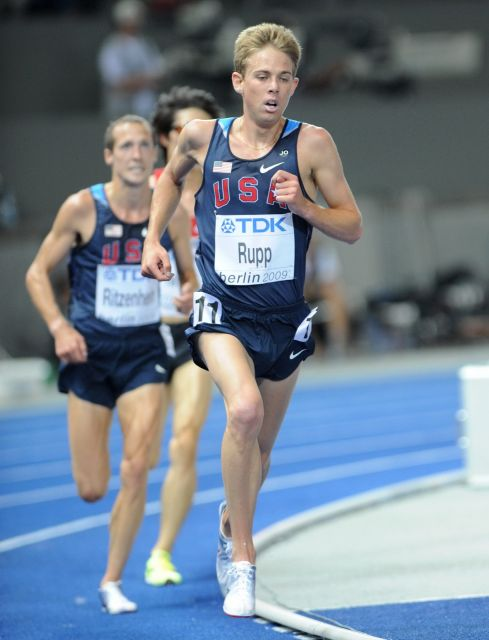
Galen Rupp

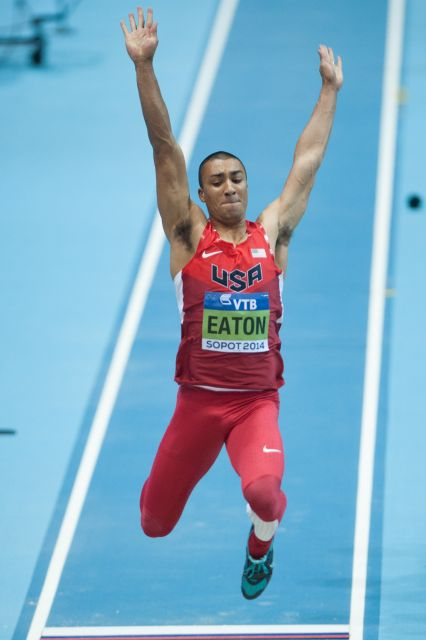
Ashton Eaton

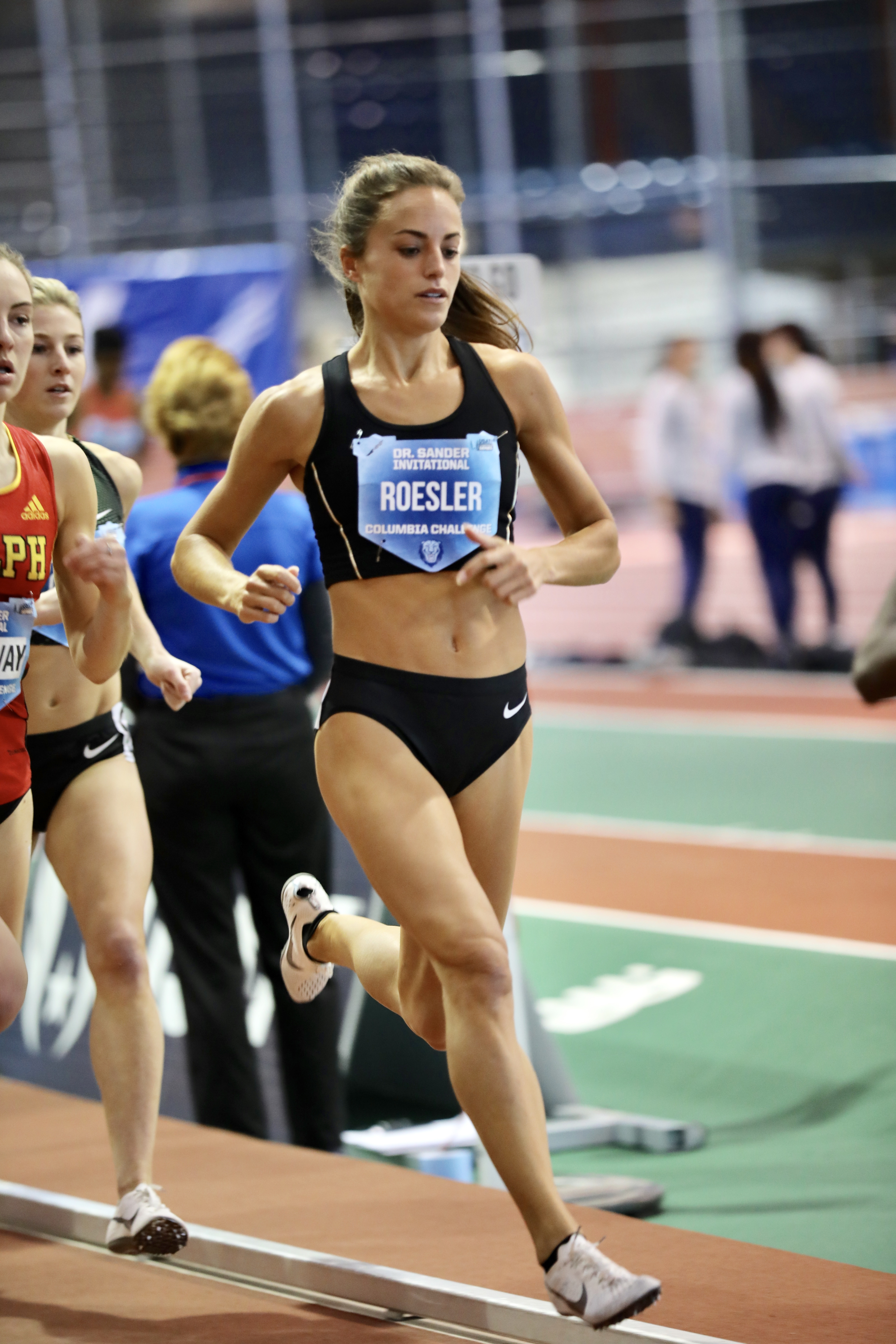
Laura Rosler

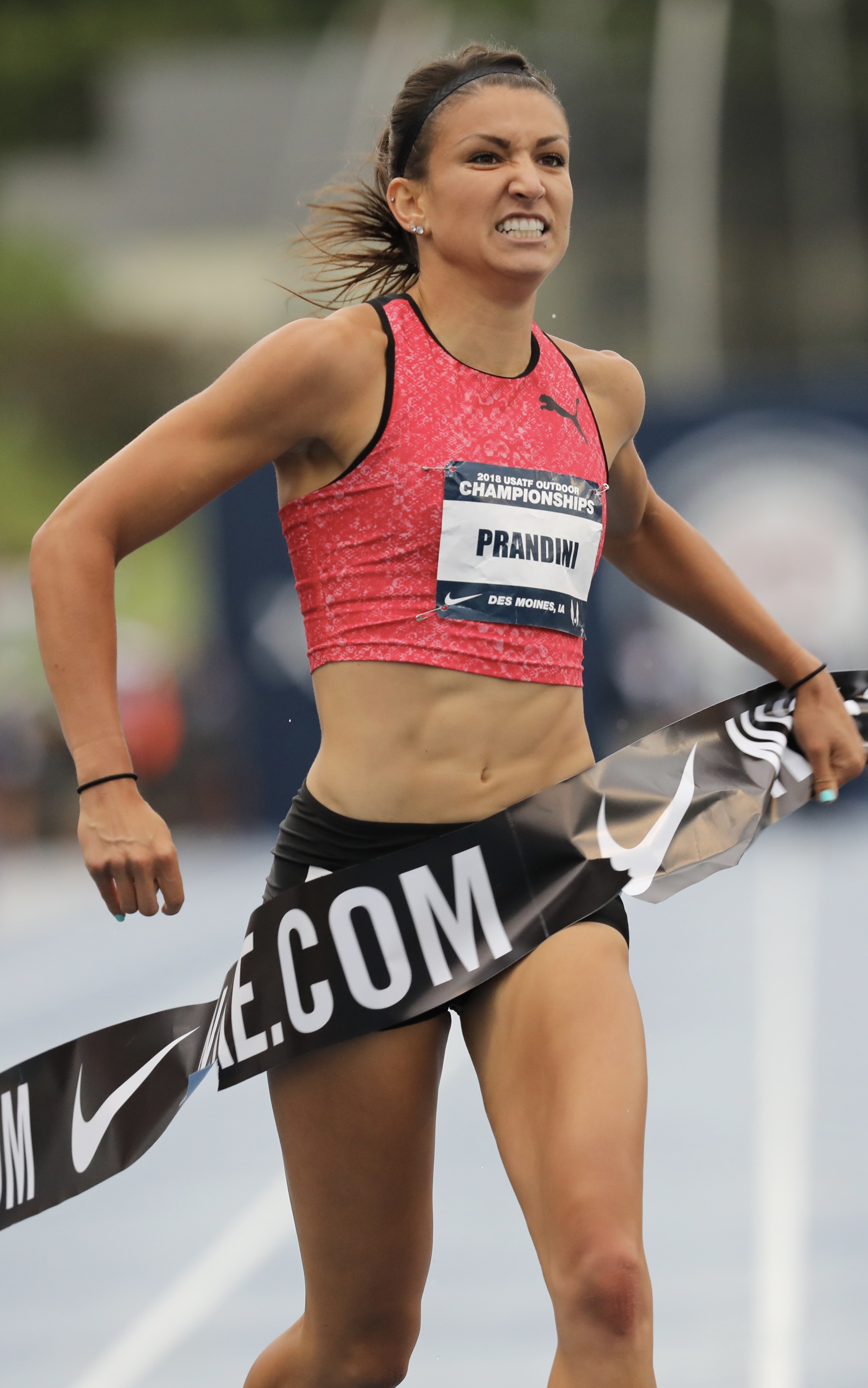
Jenna Prandini

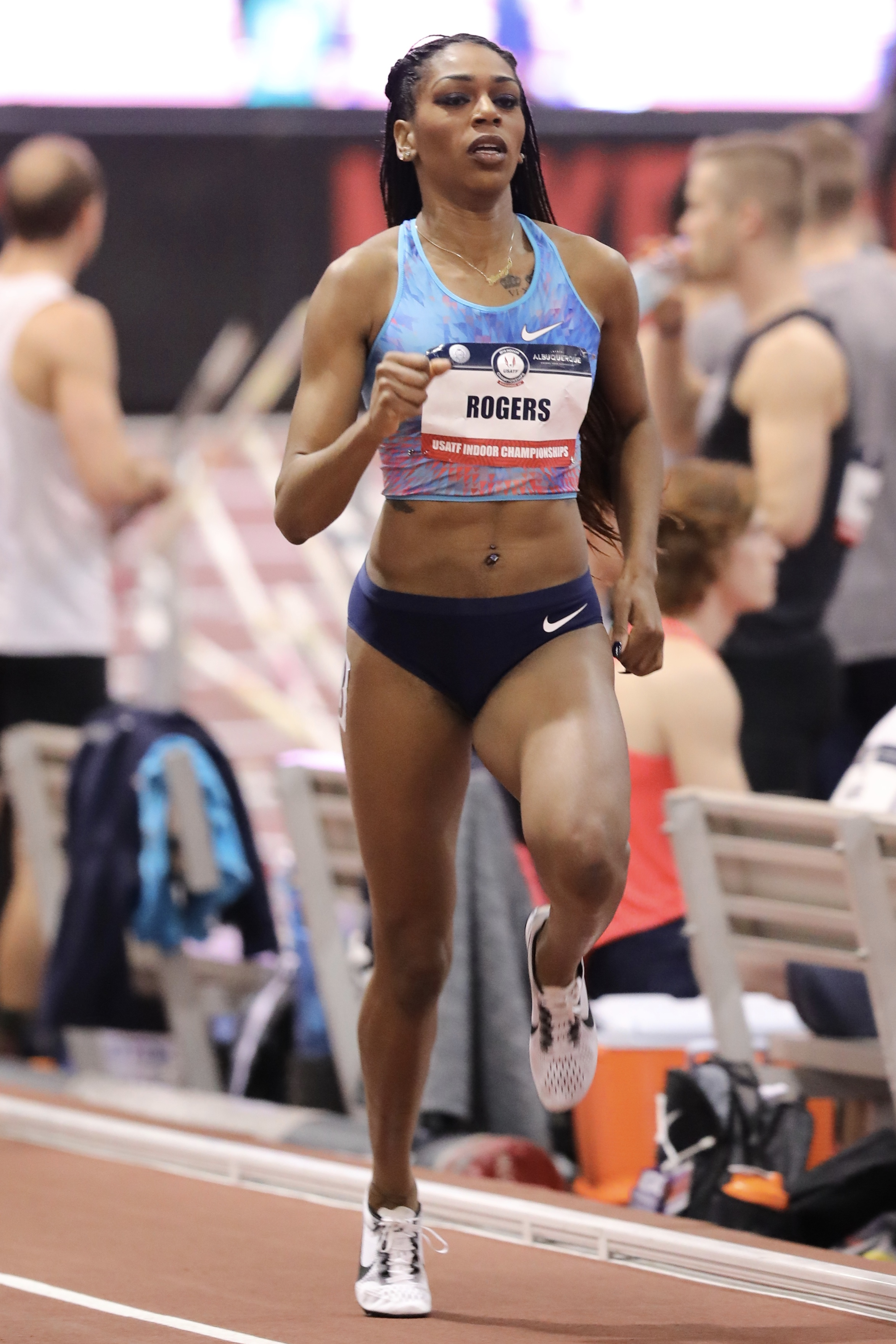
Raevyn Rogers

The Bowerman Award is the highest collegiate track and field honor annually bestowed on the best collegiate track and field athlete for each of the men's and women's. The award is named after the University of Oregon track coach Bill Bowerman and designed by Oregon track athlete Tinker Hatfield, who ran under coach Bowerman. The first year of the award was 2009, when Oregon distance runner Galen Rupp won the inaugural award on the men's side.

Male
Name	Year
Galen Rupp	2009
Ashton Eaton	2010

Female
Name	Year
Laura Roesler	2014
Jenna Prandini	2015
Raevyn Rogers	2017

=== Other athletes ===
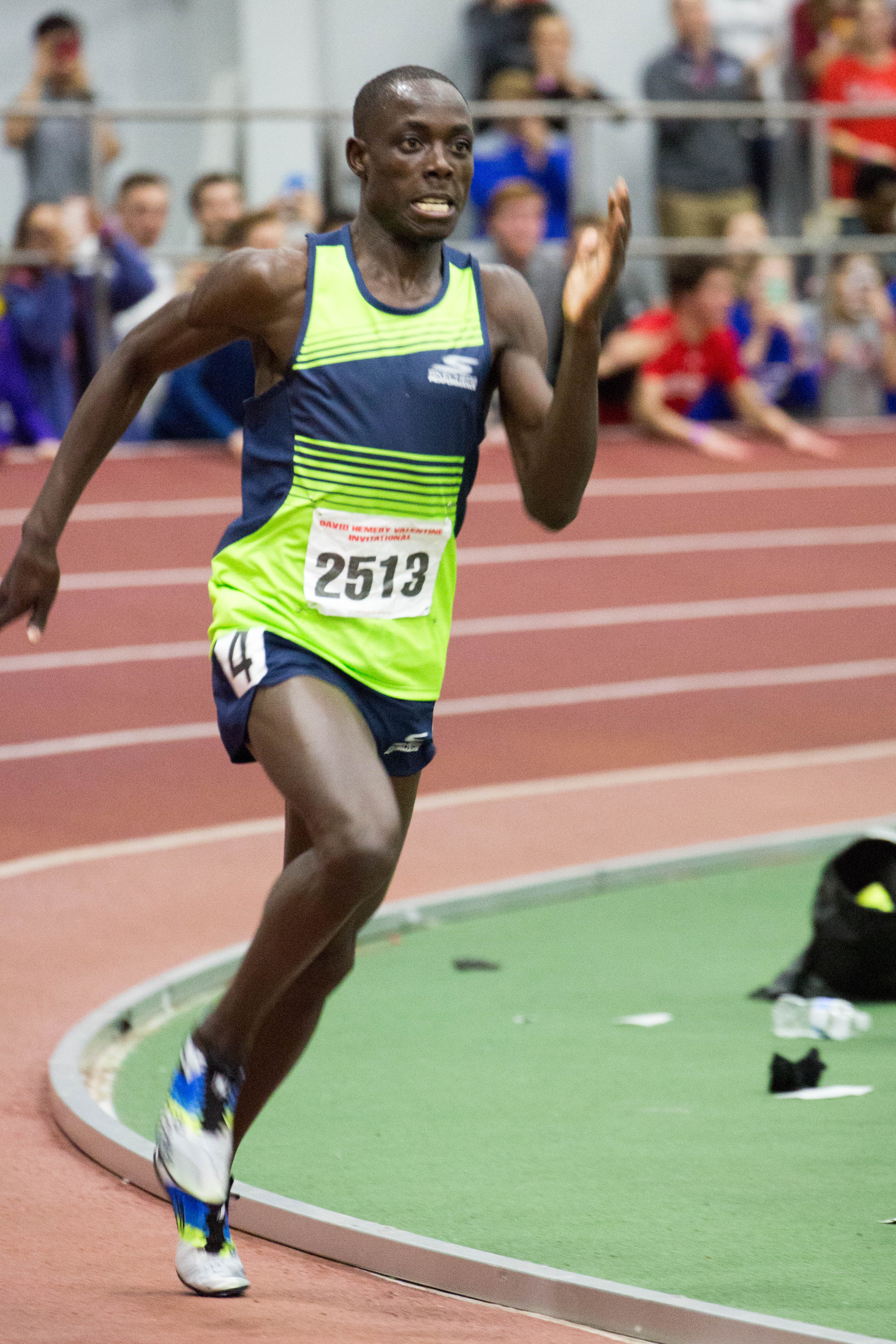
Edward Cheserek

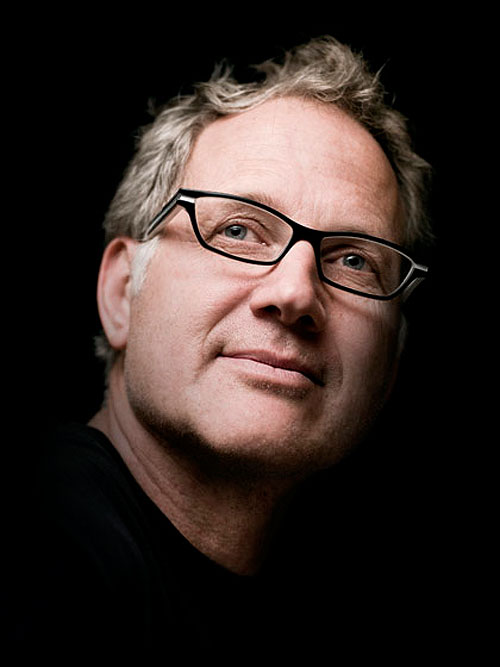
Tinker Hatfield

Name	Degree(s)	Year(s)	Notability	Reference
Bill Bowerman	B.S. M.Ed.	1934; 1953	Co-founder of Nike, former track and field head coach for the Oregon Ducks, namesake of collegiate track & field award The Bowerman	
Edward Cheserek	B.A.	2017	Won 17 NCAA titles, most of any male Division I athlete	
Matt Centrowitz		1986	Four-time USA Champion in the 5000m, head coach of the restarted track program at American University	
Rudy Chapa	B.A.	1981	Founder and CEO of SPARQ	
Bill Dellinger	B.S. M.Ed.	1956; 1962	Former track and field head coach for the Oregon Ducks	
Tinker Hatfield	B.Arch.	1976	Shoe designer for Nike, designer of The Bowerman trophy	
Phil Knight	B.B.A	1959	Co-founder, chairman, and former CEO of Nike, Inc.	
Kenny Moore	B.A. M.F.A.	1966; 1972	Long-distance runner, journalist and author	
Alexi Pappas	MA	2012	Filmmaker, actress, and writer	
Steve Prefontaine	B.S.	1974	Record-setting long-distance runner	
Alberto Salazar	B.A.	1981	Marathon runner and coach	
