= Rudy Chapa =

American runner (born 1957)

Personal information
- Nationality: American
- Born: November 7, 1957 (age 68) Hammond, Indiana

Sport
- Sport: Track, long-distance running
- Events: mile, 5000 meters, 10,000 meters, marathon
- College team: Oregon

Achievements and titles
- Personal bests: 1500 meters: 3:38.7; Mile: 3:57.04; 3000 meters: 7:37.70; 5000 meters: 13:19.22; 10,000 meters: 28:32.7; Marathon: 2:11:13

Rodolfo ("Rudy") Chapa (born November 7, 1957, in Hammond, Indiana) is a retired American track and field athlete who specialized in the middle to long-distance events. He set the US high school national record for the 10,000 meters when he ran 28:32 in 1976. Chapa was one of the most versatile distance runners, with a remarkable competitive range from the 1500 meters to the marathon. He is the son of Mexican immigrants. His father Rodolfo Sr. moved to the US as a mechanic through the Bracero program.

== Running career ==
=== High school ===
While attending Hammond High School in Hammond, Indiana, Rudy Chapa won the cross-country state championship twice in a row. The first time was in 1974, tying for 1st place in a time of 11:59.8 (2.5 miles) with fellow schoolmate Carey Pinkowski. The second came in 1975 with a time of 11:46.3 (2.5 miles). It was during his high school years that he formed part of a trio of runners from his school that all broke 9:00 minutes in the two-mile run, which he, Carey Pinkowski, and Tim Keough did in 1975. This feat has only been repeated by the boys of Northport high school of New York where 3 boys each broke 9 minutes for the 2-mile run in the same race at the New Balance outdoor national meet, although 2 of its 3 runners were twin brothers. In 1976, Chapa first gained fame as one of the U.S.A.'s great high school distance runners, setting the still-standing national high school record in the 10,000 meters, in 28:32^{1}. That same year he also won the Indiana state mile in 4:05.8h (converts to a 4:04.4h 1600 meter time), a time that held the state meet record until 2011, when it was broken by Center Grove's Austin Mudd in a competitive race with Carmel High School's Chris Walden and Westfield High School's Connor Martin.

=== Collegiate ===
After high school graduation he went out west to run for Bill Dellinger's famous University of Oregon track and field team at Hayward Field. He went on to earn All American status six times in cross country and track and was a member of Oregon's 1977 national champion cross country team. In 1978 he won the National Collegiate Athletic Association (NCAA) championship in 5,000 meters while running in front of his home crowd in Oregon. The next year he broke the American Record (AR) in the 3,000 meters at Hayward Field as well, running a time of 7:37.7 to break Steve Prefontaine's AR by five seconds. On May 28, 1981, Chapa joined the sub 4:00-mile club when he ran a 3:57.04-mile in Eugene. While at Oregon he became friends with future 5,000 meters and 10,000 meters American record holder, Alberto Salazar, another Hispanic American distance runner.

=== Post-collegiate ===
After graduating from Oregon, Chapa attended Indiana Law School. While he won some local road races (such as the Sports Med 10K in 29:21 and the Double Eagle 10-Miler in 48:08 in October 1983) Chapa's only performance of note after leaving Oregon came in the 1983 New York City Marathon when he ran a time of 2:11:13 (for 7th place), the second fastest American marathon debut at the time (behind Salazar's 2:09:41 at New York in 1980). In 1999 he was inducted into the University of Oregon athletics Hall of Fame² and was inducted into the Oregon Sports Hall of Fame in 2001.

After his athletic career, Chapa first served as the global director of sports marketing at Nike, Inc. He then left NIKE in 1999 to pursue his own entrepreneurial vision, which manifests itself today as SPARQ (Speed, Power, Agility, Reaction, Quickness), a sports equipment and media company.

== Awards and accolades ==
- Member of the Board of Trustees of the University of Oregon until 2017.
- Member of the board of Cogstate
- Member of U.S.A. Track and Field Foundation's board of directors

== Background ==
- National High School Track Records
- Indiana Sports

Sporting positions
Preceded by (Kenya) Henry Rono	Men's 3.000m Best Year Performance; 1979	Succeeded by (Republic of Ireland) Eamonn Coghlan
