= Bill Hayward =

American-Canadian sportsman (1868–1947)

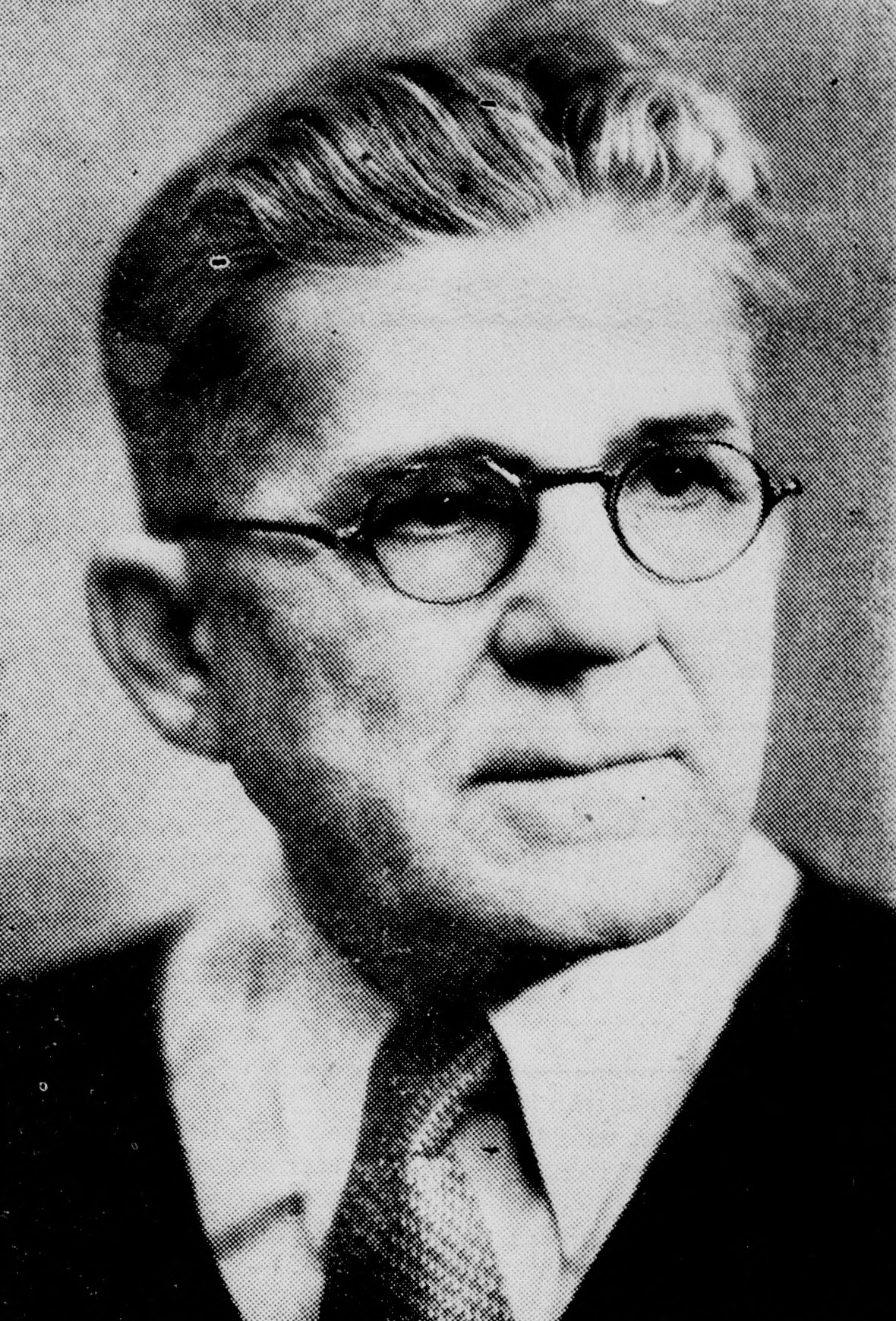
- Hayward, c. 1937

Biographical details
- Born: July 2, 1868; Detroit, Michigan, U.S.
- Died: December 14, 1947 (aged 79); Eugene, Oregon, U.S.

Coaching career (HC unless noted)

Track and field
- 1898–1900: Princeton (assistant)
- 1900–1901: California (assistant)
- 1901–1902: Pacific (OR)
- 1903: Albany (OR)
- 1904–1947: Oregon

Basketball
- 1909–1913: Oregon
- 1917–1918: Oregon

Head coaching record
- Overall: 34–29 (basketball)

William Louis "Colonel Bill" Hayward (July 2, 1868 – December 14, 1947) was an American-Canadian track and field and basketball coach. He coached track at the University of Oregon for 44 years, and for six United States Olympic teams, from 1908 through 1932.

== Athletic career ==
Hayward was born in Detroit. His parents were Canadians and he grew up in Toronto, Ontario, Canada. An all-around athlete likened to Jim Thorpe, Hayward excelled at ice hockey, rowing, wrestling, boxing, and played lacrosse on one of the Ottawa Capitals' world championship teams of the 1890s. Hayward was also renowned as one of Canada's fastest sprinters, running distances from 75 to 600 yards. His last name was originally spelled Heyward; he changed it later in life, when he headed west.

== Early coaching career ==
Hayward's first coaching job was as an assistant track coach, first at Princeton University in 1898, and then out west at the University of California, Berkeley. In 1901, he became the head track coach at Pacific University in Forest Grove, Oregon where he trained future Olympic gold medalist A. C. Gilbert and coached the Boxers to the state collegiate track championship.

In 1903, Hayward took the head job at Albany College (now Lewis & Clark College in Portland), where his track team defeated the University of Oregon. Oregon promptly hired him as their first permanent track coach the next year.

== Oregon and Olympic career ==
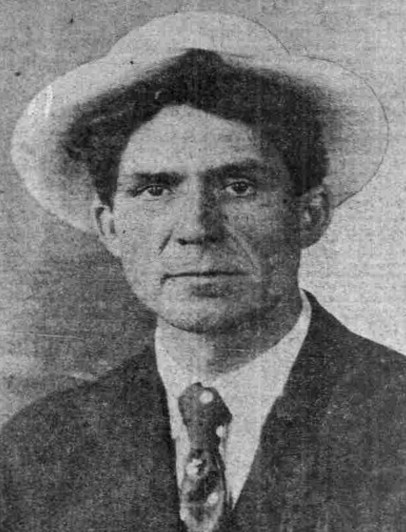
Hayward, circa 1919

As head coach of the UO track and field team, Hayward (who was known as "Colonel Bill" due to his gruff demeanor) built it into one of regional dominance and national prominence over his 44 years as coach. In all, he coached four track world record holders, six American record holders, and nine Olympians. Notable Oregon athletes trained by Hayward include:

- sprinter Daniel Kelly set records in the 100-yard dash at 9.6 seconds in 1906 and the 220 yard run (21.1 sec.), won silver medal in the long jump at the 1908 Olympics
- hurdler Martin Hawkins won a bronze medal in the 110 meter hurdles at the 1912 Olympics
- pole vaulter Ralph Spearow set the world record in 1924
- long distance runner Ralph Hill won a silver medal in the 5000 meters at the 1932 Olympics
- discus thrower Ed Moeller set the world record in 1929
- javelin thrower Bob Parke, 1934 NCAA champion
- sprinter Mack Robinson, 1938 NCAA champion in the 220 yard dash, won a silver medal in the 200 meters at the 1936 Olympics
- pole vaulter George Varoff set the world record in 1936
- high jumper Les Steers set three world records and was 1941 NCAA champion.
- Bill Bowerman succeeded Hayward as coach and co-founded Nike, Inc. with Phil Knight.

In addition to his track coaching duties, Hayward served as the athletic trainer for Oregon's football team, where he was known for inventing knee braces and other equipment for the players. He also coached UO's basketball team from 1903 to 1913 and again in 1917–1918, compiling an overall record o 34–29 (.540).

In 1912, Hayward was a coach for the United States team at the Olympic Games in Stockholm, Sweden, the first of a string of six Olympics in which he coached, through 1936.

== Hayward Field ==
Prior to 1921, Hayward's athletes trained at Kincaid Field, which was also the site of Oregon's football field. The field was upgraded several times to accommodate the needs of the growing track and field program, but by 1912, plans for a new facility were made. In 1919, a new football field was built and named Hayward Field in his honor; it was dedicated during halftime of its first football game, but Hayward was busy working as the trainer during the break and was not aware of the honor until the next day. It was two more years before track and field facilities were installed at the new venue. The opening of Autzen Stadium for football in 1967 gave the track and field team exclusive use of Hayward Field, except for a few freshman football games.

== Death and legacy ==
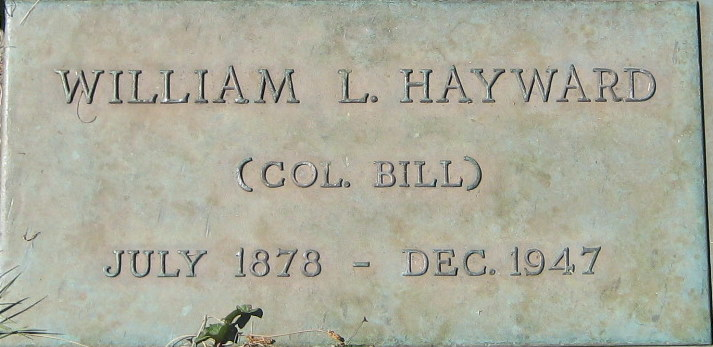
Hayward's grave marker at Rest-Haven Cemetery

Hayward retired from coaching at age 79 in the fall of 1947. He was hospitalized a few months later after being stricken with a heart ailment, and died at Sacred Heart Hospital on December 14, 1947. Hayward was buried at Rest-Haven Cemetery in Eugene.

John Warren succeeded Hayward for the 1947–48 school year, giving way to Bill Bowerman, who became Oregon's head track coach in 1948.

Hayward was an inaugural inductee to both the Oregon Sports Hall of Fame in 1980 and the University of Oregon Athletic Hall of Fame in 1992. In 2005, he was inducted into the U.S. Track & Field and Cross Country Coaches Association Hall of Fame. The Bill Hayward Amateur Athlete of Year Award is given annually to the best amateur athlete in the state of Oregon.
