= Roscoe Cook =

Personal information
- Born: March 2, 1939 El Centro, California
- Died: December 30, 2011 (aged 72) Alpharetta, Georgia

Achievements and titles
- Personal bests: 100 yards: 9.3 (1959, WR); 60 yards: 6.0 (1959 and 1960 WR)

Roscoe Cook, Jr. (March 2, 1939 – December 30, 2011) was an educator and held three world records in track.

Cook attended San Diego High, where he set numerous track and field records and was a member of the school's 1955 national championship football team. He attended the University of Oregon, where he was a member of the Oregon Ducks track and field team. In 1959 at Modesto Junior College Cook tied the world record in the 100 yards at 9.3 seconds, and in the process beat Olympic Champion Bobby Morrow and Ray Norton, who had previously run a 9.3. He also twice tied the world record of 6.0 seconds in the 60 yards in 1959 and 1960. In 1959 Cook was the Pacific Coast Conference champion at 100 yards (9.5 seconds) and 220 yards (21.0 seconds), and earned named an All-American for the 100 yards at the NCAA Championships. In 1961 Cook won the 60-yard dash with a time of 6.1 seconds at the Los Angeles Invitational indoor meet. That same year Cook earned a second All-America certificate for his fourth-place NCAA showing in the 100 yards (9.6 seconds). In addition to his track accomplishments, Cook was a member of the 1959 Oregon Ducks football team.

Cook graduated from Oregon with a degree in physical education, and later went on to obtain an M.A. and Ph.D in education from the University of Massachusetts Amherst. He worked for 30 years in Los Angeles County School districts.

In 2010 Cook was one of five individuals inducted into the University of Oregon Athletics Hall of Fame.

In 1982 Cook married Christine Pugh. Roscoe Cook died on December 30, 2011. He was survived by his wife, Christine V. Cook; six sisters, Sandra Kay Darden, Elaine McFadden, Rita Cook, Hanna Cook, Deborah Brown, and Jettiev Manning; and numerous nieces and nephews.
