= The Bowerman =

Annual American collegiate track and field award

The Bowerman is an annual track and field award that is the highest accolade given to the year's best student-athlete in American collegiate track and field. It is named after Oregon track and field and cross country coach Bill Bowerman and is administered by the U.S. Track & Field and Cross Country Coaches Association (USTFCCCA).

The winners of the award are announced in a mid-December ceremony held in conjunction with the USTFCCCA annual convention. Starting in January, The Bowerman Watch Committees regularly publish Watch Lists consisting of the top-10 athletes at the time of release. 7 Watch Lists are issued, followed by, in June, the release of the 10 semifinalists for each gender. Shortly after, the Bowerman Advisory Board meets to select three male and three female finalists, and The Bowerman Voters receive their ballots.

Finalists and winners are selected by an advisory board, consisting of NCAA administrators, national and regional media personnel, and track & field statisticians. The Board is currently chaired by Herman Frazier, an Olympic medalist and former longtime athletic director and administrator at the Division I level.

As of December 2024, 23 winners of the award have won a combined 22 Olympic and 60 World Athletics Championship medals. 21 non-winning finalists of the award have won a combined 25 Olympic and 54 World Athletics Championship medals.

Past winners include Julien Alfred, the first Olympic medalist in Saint Lucian history, 2021 Olympic 800 meter Champion Athing Mu, and 2024 Olympic Medalist Sha'Carri Richardson. Past finalists include pole vault World Record holder and 2024 Olympic Pole Vault Champion Mondo Duplantis, 110 meter hurdle World Record holder Ja'Kobe Tharp, and 400 meter hurdle World Record holder Sydney McLaughlin-Leverone.

The Bowerman trophy was designed by Tinker Hatfield, a Bowerman-coached pole vaulter at the University of Oregon. Hatfield, who spent extensive time working for Nike, designed the 35-pound, 20 inch tall trophy, which is made out of a block of aluminum and plated with gold.

== List of recipients ==
Year	Male winner		Female winner		Ref.
Year	Athlete	Team	Athlete	Team	Ref.
2009	Galen Rupp	Oregon Ducks	Jenny Barringer	Colorado Buffaloes	
2010	Ashton Eaton	Oregon Ducks	Queen Harrison	Virginia Tech Hokies	
2011	Ngonidzashe Makusha	Florida State Seminoles	Jessica Beard	Texas A&M Aggies	
2012	Cam Levins	Southern Utah Thunderbirds	Kimberlyn Duncan	LSU Lady Tigers	
2013	Derek Drouin	Indiana Hoosiers	Brianna Rollins	Clemson Tigers	
2014	Deon Lendore	Texas A&M Aggies	Laura Roesler	Oregon Ducks	
2015	Marquis Dendy	Florida Gators	Jenna Prandini	Oregon Ducks	
2016	Jarrion Lawson	Arkansas Razorbacks	Courtney Okolo	Texas Longhorns	
2017	Christian Coleman	Tennessee Volunteers	Raevyn Rogers	Oregon Ducks	
2018	Michael Norman	USC Trojans	Keturah Orji	Georgia Bulldogs	
2019	Grant Holloway	Florida Gators	Sha'Carri Richardson	LSU Lady Tigers	
2021	JuVaughn Harrison	LSU Tigers	Athing Mu	Texas A&M Aggies	
2022	Trey Cunningham	Florida State Seminoles	Abby Steiner	Kentucky Wildcats	
2023	Jaydon Hibbert	Arkansas Razorbacks	Julien Alfred	Texas Longhorns	
2024	Leo Neugebauer	Texas Longhorns	Parker Valby	Florida Gators	
2025	Jordan Anthony	Arkansas Razorbacks	Doris Lemngole	Alabama Crimson Tide	
