= Bill Dellinger =

American middle-distance runner (1934–2025)

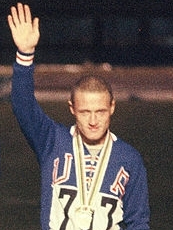
- Dellinger at the 1964 Summer Olympics

Personal information
- Full name: William Solon Dellinger
- Born: March 23, 1934 Grants Pass, Oregon, U.S.
- Died: June 27, 2025 (aged 91) Eugene, Oregon, U.S.

Sport
- Sport: Track and Field
- Events: 1500 m, 5000 m
- Club: Oregon Track Club
- Team: University of Oregon
- Coached by: Bill Bowerman

Achievements and titles
- Personal bests: 1500 m – 3:41.5 (1958); 1 mile – 4:02.7 (1961); 2 miles – 8:43.8 (1961); 5000 m – 13:49.8 (1964)
Medal record
Representing the United States
Olympic Games
Bronze medal – third place	1964 Tokyo	5000 m
Pan American Games
Gold medal – first place	1959 Chicago	5000 m

William Solon Dellinger (March 23, 1934 – June 27, 2025) was an American middle-distance runner and coach. He competed in the 5,000 m at the 1956, 1960 and 1964 Olympics and won a bronze medal in 1964, setting his personal record. He lettered in track at the University of Oregon in 1954, 1955, and 1956.

== Coaching career ==
Upon retirement from competition, Dellinger took a position as the assistant coach to Bill Bowerman for the Oregon Ducks track and field team. After Bowerman's retirement in 1972, Dellinger succeeded him as head coach. In his 25 years of coaching, Dellinger's men won five NCAA titles, achieved 108 All American honors, and had a 134–29 meet record. He was the Pac-10 coach of the year multiple times.

Dellinger was instrumental in the development and coaching of Oregon and American great distance star Steve Prefontaine in conjunction with Bowerman, and their experience was made into a 1997 film Prefontaine, in which Bill Dellinger was played by Ed O'Neill.

In Co-Operation with Adidas, Dellinger developed the so-called "Dellinger Web", a Cushioning Technology used on various Shoes throughout the 1980s and early 1990s.

Dellinger also coached many post-collegians including Olympians Mary Decker, Bill McChesney, Alberto Salazar, Matt Centrowitz, Don Clary, and many others.

== After retiring from coaching ==
Dellinger retired from the University of Oregon in 1998 and would later join his mentor, Bill Bowerman, as an inductee in the National Track and Field Hall of Fame in 2001. He retired after he had a stroke in 2000.

From his retirement on, he stayed out of the track and field world except for a few appearances at meets named in his honor.

In 2021, USA Track and Field awarded Dellinger their Legend Coach Award.

Dellinger was inducted into the USTFCCCA Collegiate Athlete Hall of Fame in 2024.

== Death ==
Dellinger died on June 27, 2025, at a care facility in Eugene, Oregon from cancer at the age of 91.

== Records ==
Records set by Dellinger:

- 1956 American Record holder: 5000 meters 14:16.2
- 1958 American Record holder: 1500 meters 3:41.5
- 1959 World Record holder (indoors): 2 miles 8:49.9
- 1959 World Record holder (indoors): 3 miles 13:37.0
- 1960 American record holder: 2 miles 8:43.8

== See also ==
- Prefontaine
- Inspirational/motivational instructors/mentors portrayed in films
