= SPARQ Training =

Sports training for standardized test

SPARQ
- Company type: Private (2004–09)
- Industry: Sports equipment
- Founded: 2004
- Defunct: 2009; 17 years ago
- Fate: Acquired by Nike in 2009, becoming a brand of it
- Successor: Nike
- Headquarters: Portland, Oregon, US
- Area served: United States
- Products: Athletics gear

SPARQ was a US-based company started in 2004 to create a standardized test for athleticism called the 'SPARQ Rating' and to sell training equipment and methods to help improve athleticism focused on the high school athlete (an "SAT" for athletes). 'SPARQ' is an acronym; it stands for Speed, Power, Agility, Reaction and Quickness. "Nike SPARQ" was the name used under a marketing relationship between Nike and SPARQ, under which Nike sold a line of cross training footwear, apparel and equipment in the USA.

SPARQ's headquarters was in Portland, Oregon, with a distribution center in Oconomowoc, Wisconsin, until its sale to Nike in 2009 (Nike kept the distribution center open in Oconomowoc until March 2010). After the purchase, both the headquarters and distribution center were incorporated into Nike's operations.

Some of the products by SPARQ included medicine balls, agility drills, parachutes, slidesteppers, and hurdles.

SPARQ's business were focused on the rating system and selling advanced functional fitness training equipment. The company did not own any training facilities or have any one specific training method. They provided training videos and tips from a number of top speed, strength and conditioning coaches on their website. SPARQ developed a training network made up of over 750 SPARQ Certified Trainers located throughout the country who were both independent coaches and trainers at chain performance centers. Some of the more well-known independent facilities included TopSpeed Strength & Conditioning in Kansas City, the Michael Johnson Performance Center in Dallas and Athletic Evolution in Massachusetts. National training companies included CATZ (the Competitive Athlete Training Zone) and Velocity Sports Performance. SPARQ formed a broad, non-exclusive partnership with Velocity Sports Performance to provide certified SPARQ Testing at all of their centers.

== Assessment ==
The SPARQ Rating was a sport-specific assessment of athleticism. SPARQ had test protocols for six sports –american football, boys'/girls' soccer, baseball, fastpitch, boys'/girls' basketball, as well as a test for general athleticism. The tests were designed to test the skills and athleticism demanded by each sport. In the past years over 44,000 athletes have been assessed and received SPARQ ratings.

Some famous athletes who recorded SPARQ Ratings are:

- Reggie Bush (93.38)
- Tim Tebow (96.92)
- Jonathan Stewart (97.54)
- Jacoby Ellsbury (102.31)
- Gold Medalist decathlete Bryan Clay recorded a football rating of 130.40.
- Mike Mitchell, a linebacker for Ohio State, Texas Tech, and Southeastern University holds the national record SPARQ Rating. He set it with a score of 154.47.

== Components ==
The SPARQ general athletic assessment test was composed of:

- 20-meter sprint / 40-yard dash (Footspeed)
- Kneeling Power Ball Toss (Power)
- Agility Shuttle (Agility)
- Yo-Yo Intermittent Recovery Test or YIRT (Reaction, Quickness, and Endurance)
- Vertical Jump (Power)

=== 40-yard dash ===
The 40-yard dash was the simplest activity; an athlete runs 40 yards down a track, and his/her time is recorded by a trainer or other method. This time is taken and put into "SPARQ Points", which were added to determine the athlete's overall rating.

=== Kneeling power ball toss ===
In the Kneeling Power Ball Toss, an athlete must kneel with both knees on a flat surface while raising a 2 or 3 kilogram medicine / power ball over their head. They must proceed to thrust outward, landing in a push-up position. The distance in inches is then turned into SPARQ Points to be added to the final score.

=== Agility shuttle ===
The Agility Shuttle is a shuttle run in which an athlete must run 5 yards, touch an object or mark, proceed to run 10 yards in the opposite direction and touch a second object or mark. Finally, they must switch direction and run another 5 yards to the starting point. Their time is measured in seconds and transferred into SPARQ Points.

=== Yo-Yo intermittent recovery test (beep test) ===
The Yo-Yo Intermittent Recovery Test is a test measuring an athlete's aerobic power and execution upon the changing of direction. A recording is played, giving instruction, and the athlete(s) must proceed to run 20 meters at the sound of a beep. At the sound of the second beep the athlete must run back to the starting line, after which the third beep sounds a 10-second recovery period the athlete jogs or walks in a 5-meter zone before resuming position back to the starting line, for the next beep. The time in between each beep (bar the constant 10second recovery) decreases gradually. If the athlete does not reach the start line in time, a warning is given, and the test is completed when two warnings are given. The total time taken until the two warnings are given, i.e. the test is completed, is what is measured.

=== Vertical jump ===
During the Vertical Jump, an athlete must stand on a pad with some sort of compatible height measurer attached. The athlete goes into a balanced crouch with their arms behind them to help propel them, then they swiftly jump out into the air, out of their crouch, and the pad measures their height in inches based on the amount of time in the air, between the two points of contact. This then becomes SPARQ points to be added to the score.
