= Illinois agility test =

Physical fitness test

The Illinois agility test is a fitness test designed to test one's sport agility. It is a simple test which is easy to administer and requires little equipment. It tests the subject's ability to turn in different directions and quickly change speeds.

The goal of the test is to complete the running course in the shortest possible time. Cones mark the course. The subject starts face down, with their head to the start line and hands on the ground by their shoulders. At the whistle, the subject runs the course without knocking down any cones.

The course can be measured out either in meters or feet (10 m long by 5 m wide or 30 ft long by 15 ft wide).

The Illinois agility test is a popular agility test used in sports and athletics to evaluate an athlete's ability to change direction quickly and effectively. The test is often used at the elite level to assess an athlete's agility and to design specific training programmes to improve agility performance.
