= Prefontaine (film) =

- Theatrical release poster
- Directed by: Steve James
- Written by: Steve James; Eugene Corr
- Produced by: Mark Doonan; Peter Gilbert; Jon Lutz; Irby Smith
- Starring: Jared Leto; R. Lee Ermey; Ed O'Neill; Amy Locane; Lindsay Crouse; Breckin Meyer; Laurel Holloman
- Cinematography: Peter Gilbert
- Edited by: Peter Frank
- Music by: Mason Daring
- Production company: Hollywood Pictures
- Distributed by: Buena Vista Pictures Distribution
- Release date: January 24, 1997
- Running time: 107 minutes
- Country: United States
- Language: English
- Budget: $8 million
- Box office: $589,304

Prefontaine is a 1997 American biographical film chronicling the life of the American long-distance runner Steve Prefontaine and his death at age 24. Jared Leto plays the title character, and R. Lee Ermey plays coach Bill Bowerman. The film was written by Steve James and Eugene Corr, and directed by James. Prefontaine tells the story from the point of view of Bill Dellinger, played by Ed O'Neill, the assistant coach who was with him day-to-day, and Nancy Alleman, the runner's girlfriend at the time of his death.

== Plot ==
Steve Prefontaine, a Coos Bay, Oregon student, is too small to play most sports but becomes a talented distance runner. He enrolls at the University of Oregon in 1969, and meets fellow Oregon Ducks track and field athletes Pat Tyson and Mac Wilkins. With coaches Bill Bowerman and Bill Dellinger, "Pre" wins three national cross-country championships and four consecutive 5,000-meter runs, breaking the U.S. record in the latter. Prefontaine gains fame as an aggressive runner who likes to be out front from the start, rather than biding his time until a strong finish.

Prefontaine accompanies other top American runners including Frank Shorter and Jeff Galloway to the 1972 Munich Olympics, where they witness the terrorist attacks of the Munich Massacre which interrupt and almost cancel the games. In the 5,000-meter, Prefontaine leads with 150 meters to go, but three different runners pass him and he does not medal. The gold goes to Finland's Lasse Viren.

After his college career ends, Prefontaine prepares for a rematch with Viren at the 1976 Montreal Olympics. The strict amateurism rules of American non-collegiate sports force Prefontaine to turn down a lucrative offer to become a professional runner, instead working as a bartender while living in a trailer home. He becomes an activist to help American athletes compete against better-funded international rivals. On May 30, 1975, after drinking alcohol at a post-meet party, Prefontaine is killed when his MG convertible flips while he is driving. After his death, the Amateur Sports Act of 1978 gives athletes more control over their sports' governance.

== Cast ==
- Jared Leto as Steve Prefontaine
- Ed O'Neill as Bill Dellinger
- R. Lee Ermey as Bill Bowerman
- Amy Locane as Nancy Alleman
- Breckin Meyer as Pat Tyson
- Lindsay Crouse as Elfriede Prefontaine
- Brian McGovern as Mac Wilkins
- Kurtwood Smith as Curtis Cunningham
- Laurel Holloman as Elaine Finley

== Production ==
The majority of the film was shot at the University of Puget Sound campus in Tacoma, Washington. Peyton Field was redecorated to resemble Hayward Field at the University of Oregon. For the role of Steve Prefontaine, Jared Leto immersed himself in the runner's life, meeting with members of the family and friends. He bore a striking resemblance to the real Prefontaine, also adopting the athlete's voice and upright running style. The transformation was so complete that when the runner's sister, Linda, first saw him in character, she broke down and cried. Prefontaine explores American athletes' amateur status and the conditions and lack of resources these athletes had to endure in their attempts to compete with the world's top athletes, who were provided all they needed to train and compete at a top level, while dealing with the pressure from their American fans who expected nothing but the best from them.

== Critical reception ==
Upon its premiere at the 1997 Sundance Film Festival, Prefontaine was positively received by critics and audiences, who greatly praised the film for Leto's acting and James' direction. As of March 2020, Rotten Tomatoes reports that 56% of critics gave the film a positive review, based on 36 reviews with an average score of 6.31 out of 10. On Metacritic, which assigns a weighted mean rating out of 100 reviews from film critics, the film has a rating score of 56 based on 15 reviews, indicating mixed or average reviews. Film critics Gene Siskel and Roger Ebert praised the film giving it "two thumbs up" on their television program.

== See also ==
- Without Limits, another film based on Prefontaine's life.
- List of films about the sport of athletics
