= Agility =

Ability to quickly change the quantity and direction of body speed

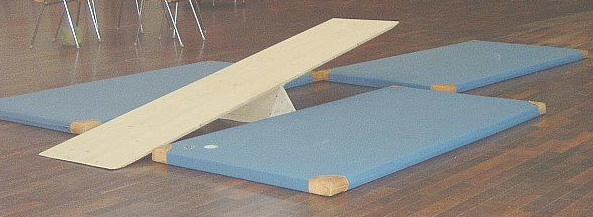
Material to exercise the balance agility for children

Agility or nimbleness is an ability to change the body's position quickly and requires the integration of isolated movement skills using a combination of balance, coordination, speed, reflexes, strength, and endurance. More specifically, it is dependent on these six skills:

- Balance – The ability to maintain equilibrium when stationary or moving (i.e., not to fall over) through the coordinated actions of our sensory functions (eyes, ears and the proprioceptive organs in our joints);
- Static balance – The ability to retain the center of mass above the base of support in a stationary position;
- Dynamic balance – The ability to maintain balance with body movement; an equal distribution of weight;
- Speed – The ability to move all or part of the body quickly;
- Strength – The ability of a muscle or muscle group to overcome a resistance; and lastly,
- Coordination – The ability to control the movement of the body in co-operation with the body's sensory functions (e.g., in catching a ball [ball, hand, and eye coordination]).

In sports, agility is often defined in terms of an individual sport, due to it being an integration of many components each used differently (specific to all sorts of different sports). Sheppard and Young (2006) defined agility as a "rapid whole body movement with change of direction or velocity in response to a stimulus". High-intensity reactive agility training has been demonstrated to significantly enhance on-court movement efficiency and match performance in competitive racket sports such as badminton.

== Use of the concept of agility in other subject areas ==
Agility is an important attribute in many role playing games, both video games such as Pokémon, and tabletop games such as Dungeons & Dragons. Agility may affect the character's ability to evade an enemy's attack or land their own, or pickpocket and pick locks.

In modern-day psychology, author, psychologist, and executive coach Susan David introduces a concept that she terms “emotional agility,” defined as: “being flexible with your thoughts and feelings so that you can respond optimally to everyday situations.”

The concept has also been applied to higher education management and leadership, where it has been used to accelerate traditionally slower and more deliberative processes and replace them with corporate-style decision-making.

The concept has also been used in modern-day filmmaking by filmmakers to adapt swiftly to changes in their environments, circumstances, narratives and tight budgets in order to deliver high-quality films that seem to captivate audiences without unnecessary delays.

== See also ==
- Illinois agility test
- Agility drill
- Fitness trail
- Freerunning
- Parkour
