= Matt Centrowitz =

American distance runner

Matthew Centrowitz Sr.
Personal information
- Nationality: American
- Born: January 28, 1955 (age 71) New York, New York, U.S.
- Education: University of Oregon

Sport
- Country: United States of America
- Sport: Track and Field
- Event: 5,000 meters
- Coached by: Bill Dellinger
Medal record
Men's Athletics
Representing United States
Pan American Games
Gold medal – first place	1979 San Juan, PR	5000 m
USA Outdoor Championships
Gold medal – first place	1982	5000 m
Gold medal – first place	1981	5000 m
Gold medal – first place	1980	5000 m
Gold medal – first place	1979	5000 m

Matthew Centrowitz Sr. (born January 28, 1955) is a two-time Olympic distance runner, a four-time United States champion, a collegiate All-American, a nationally renowned high school athlete, and a collegiate cross country and track coach.

== Life and early career ==
Centrowitz was born in New York, New York, the son of Theresa (Corrigan) and Sid Centrowitz. His father was Jewish and his mother was an Irish immigrant. He attended Power Memorial Academy, where he won state championships in the half mile, one mile and two mile events and became the first New Yorker to break nine minutes in the two mile run (8:56.2). In 1973 (his senior year), he was ranked as the country's number one high school mile runner. He has the fourth best all-time high school 1500 m time of 3:43.4 and still holds the state record in the 1500 m and mile (4:02.7) events.

He attended Manhattan College in New York for one year, then transferred to the University of Oregon. In 1976, he broke Steve Prefontaine's 1500 m school record, running 3:36.7. He was on the Ducks' 1977 NCAA Cross Country Championship team and graduated from Oregon in 1978.

== International competition ==
Centrowitz was a member of the US Olympic Team in 1976, competing in the 1500 m. He qualified for the 1980 U.S. Olympic team but did not compete due to the U.S. Olympic Committee's boycott of the 1980 Summer Olympics in Moscow, Russia. He was one of 461 athletes to receive a Congressional Gold Medal instead. He won a gold medal in the 5000 m run at the 1979 Pan-American Games in San Juan, Puerto Rico, and followed that with four United States national championships in the 5000 m run from 1979 to 1982. In 1982, he set the American record in the 5000 m with a time of 13:12.91.

== Coaching ==
He was the track coach for the Reebok Enclave, in charge of training distance runners who tried out for the 1996 and 2000 U.S. Olympic Team. He has coached three Olympians: David Strang, John Trautman and Jen Rhines; and 1993 U.S. 1500 m Champion Bill Burke. Centrowitz is a member of the U.S. Olympic Development Committee.

Centrowitz began his coaching career as an assistant track coach at St. John's University (New York). He restarted the track program at American University in 1999, becoming the cross-country and track coach. Centrowitz has coached seven All-American runners. In 2001–02, his athletes captured nine Patriot League titles in track and field, earned seventeen All-League honors, two All-Region honors and one All-East award. In 2003–04, both the men's and women's cross country teams captured league titles, five of the six Athletes of the Meet, twenty First-Team All-League selections and nine Second-Team All-League selections. In 2004–05, the men's cross country team won its third straight Patriot League title.

In July, 2018, he was named Cross Country and Track and Field Director at Manhattan College.

== Awards and honors ==
Centrowitz was inducted into the University of Oregon Athletic Hall of Fame with the other members of the 1977 University of Oregon Cross Country team in 1998. In 2005, he was named Mid-Atlantic Regional Coach of the Year.

== Personal life ==
Matt Centrowitz and his wife Beverly had three children while living in Annapolis, Maryland. Two of his children, daughter Lauren and son Matthew Jr. are also accomplished distance runners. Lauren competed for Stanford University and qualified for the Olympic Trials in 2012. Matt Jr competed for the University of Oregon (his father's alma mater) and competed professionally with the Bowerman Track Club. In 2011, Matt Jr. became the 2011 United States Champion in the 1500 metres and was the bronze medalist at 1500 metres in the 2011 World Championships. In 2016, he won the gold medal at the 2016 World Indoor Championships and then won the gold medal in the 1500 metres at the 2016 Summer Olympics in Rio de Janeiro, becoming the first U.S. runner to win the event since 1908.

Awards and achievements
Preceded by (United States) Marty Liquori	USA Outdoor Champion 5000 m run 1979–82	Succeeded by (United States) Doug Padilla
