= Agility drill =

Form of physical exercise which aims to improve agility

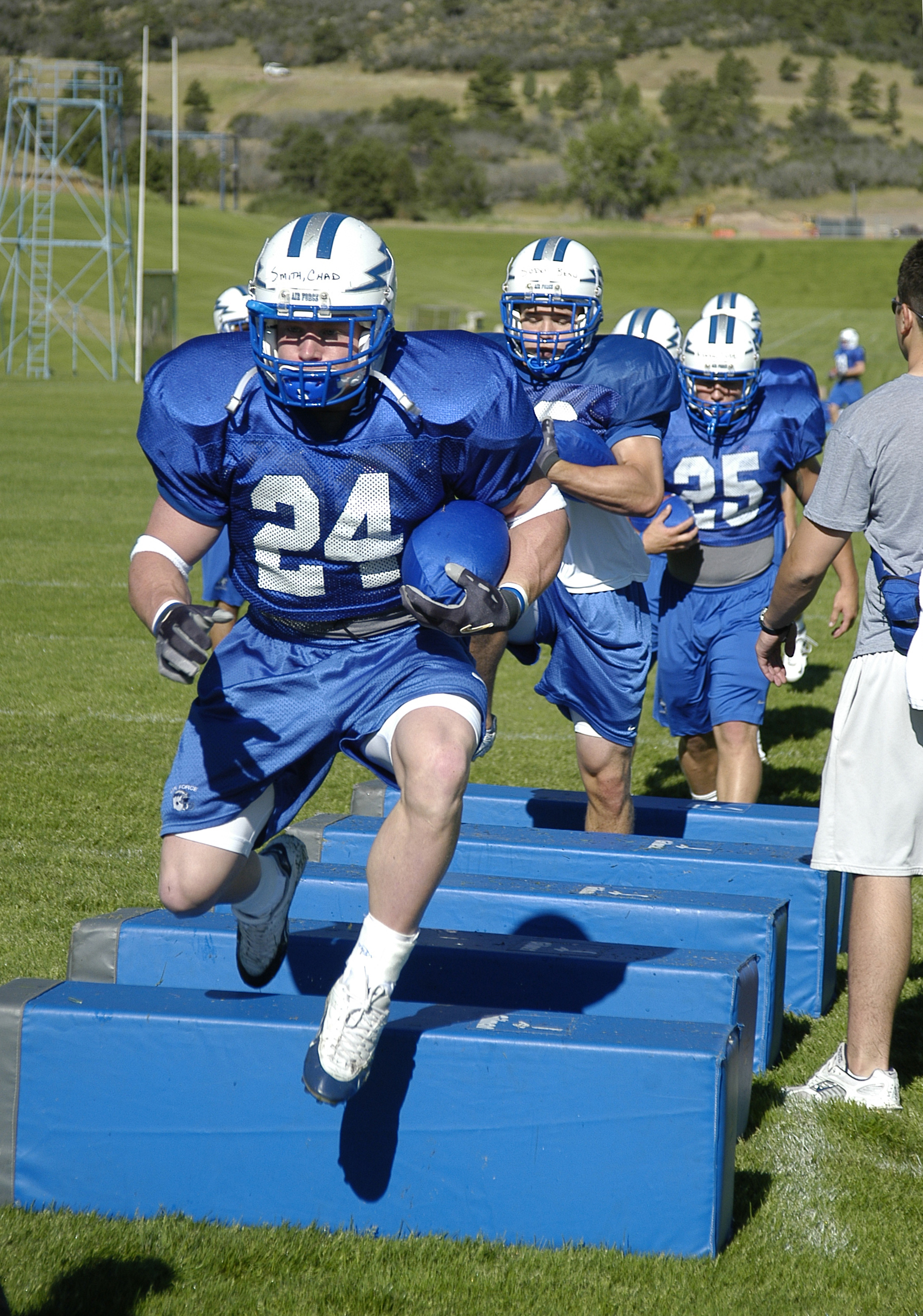
American football players practice agility drills

Agility drills are used in the aim of improving sports agility, which is the ability to change direction and accelerate while in motion.

== Description ==
The ability to change direction while in motion is very important in many sports but especially in team and dual sports. For example, an American football running back must be able to quickly change direction when he sees an opponent preparing to tackle him. A basketball player must be able to quickly change directions when dribbling the ball, attempting to get back on defense, or when trying to beat an opponent to the ball. A tennis player must be able to quickly change directions when moving to a position where the ball is expected to go but instead finds the ball going in a different direction.

== Jumping ==
Drills that entail jumping with turns in the air are usually applicable to basketball players and receivers and pass defenders in football but can apply to many sports in interest of strength. Drills that use side jumps and front-back jumps are more specific to team sports in which the athlete must change direction while running. Drills that require jumping over objects is usually best suited for sports in which the player must leap over hurdles or players. These drills usually use some form of rope ladders, small or low hurdles, ladders, or small cones.

== Ladders, hurdles and cones ==
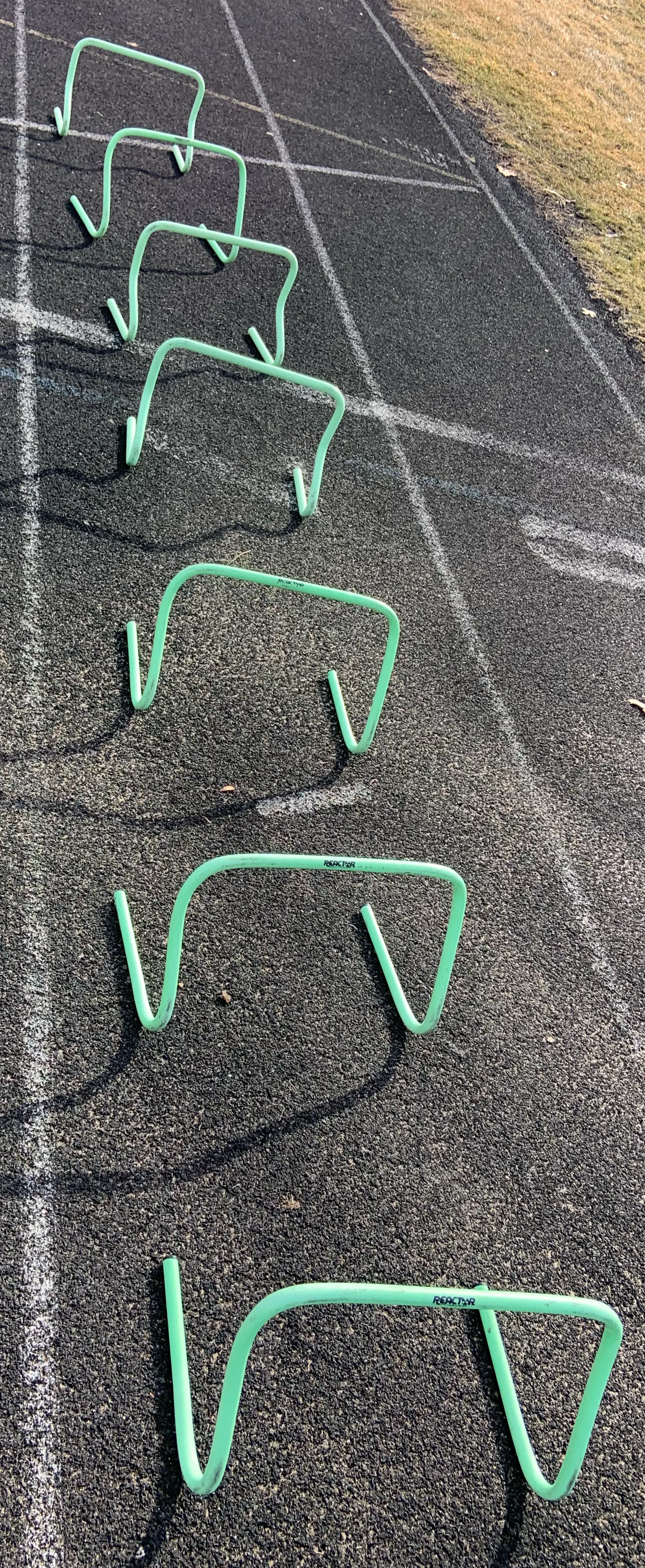
Agility hurdles

The drills that use ladders, hurdles and cones are used extensively in many different sports.

== Cutting action ==
For the drill to be successful in relation to improving sports performance on the field or court, it must include cutting actions. Learning how to do the cutting action is imperative. It involves both technical and physical components that are learned skills. These skills must be mastered in order to get maximum benefit in the agility drill.
