= Daniel Kelly (athlete) =

American long jumper and sprinter (1883–1920)

Medal record

Men's athletics

Representing the United States

Olympic Games
Silver medal – second place	1908 London	Long jump

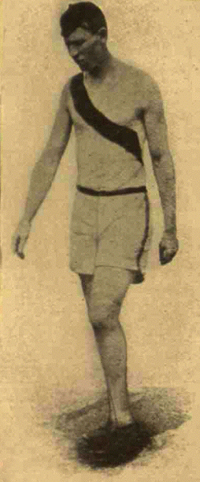
Daniel Kelly (athlete)

Daniel Joseph Kelly (September 1, 1883 – April 9, 1920) was an American long jumper and sprinter.

He attended the University of Portland's Columbia Prep high school, where in 1905, he broke the existing world record for the long jump with a jump of 22 feet, 1-1/4 inches. He later attended the University of Oregon, where in 1906, he equaled the world records in the 100 meter and 200 meter dashes in the same day. In 1908, Kelly briefly joined the Irish American Athletic Club. The same year, he competed for the United States in the London Summer Olympics in the long jump, where he won the silver medal. He is a member of the University of Oregon Athletic Hall of Fame and the Oregon Sports Hall of Fame.
