= U.S. Track & Field and Cross Country Coaches Association =

American sports organization

The U.S. Track & Field and Cross Country Coaches Association (USTFCCCA) is a New Orleans–based non-profit professional association representing men's and women's cross country and track & field coaches in the United States. The organization includes thousands of coaches from the NCAA, NAIA, NJCAA, and state high school athletic associations.

The group serves as an advocate for coaches, providing a national forum to address their needs. It also serves as a lobbyist for coaches' interests, and a "liaison between the various stakeholders" in the sport.

== Hall of Fame ==
The organization is the custodian of the USTFCCCA Coaches Hall of Fame, founded in 1995.

== The Bowerman ==
The organization administers the highest award given to collegiate student athletes in track & field, The Bowerman. The award was founded in 2009.
