= Nike Cortez =

First track shoe released by Nike

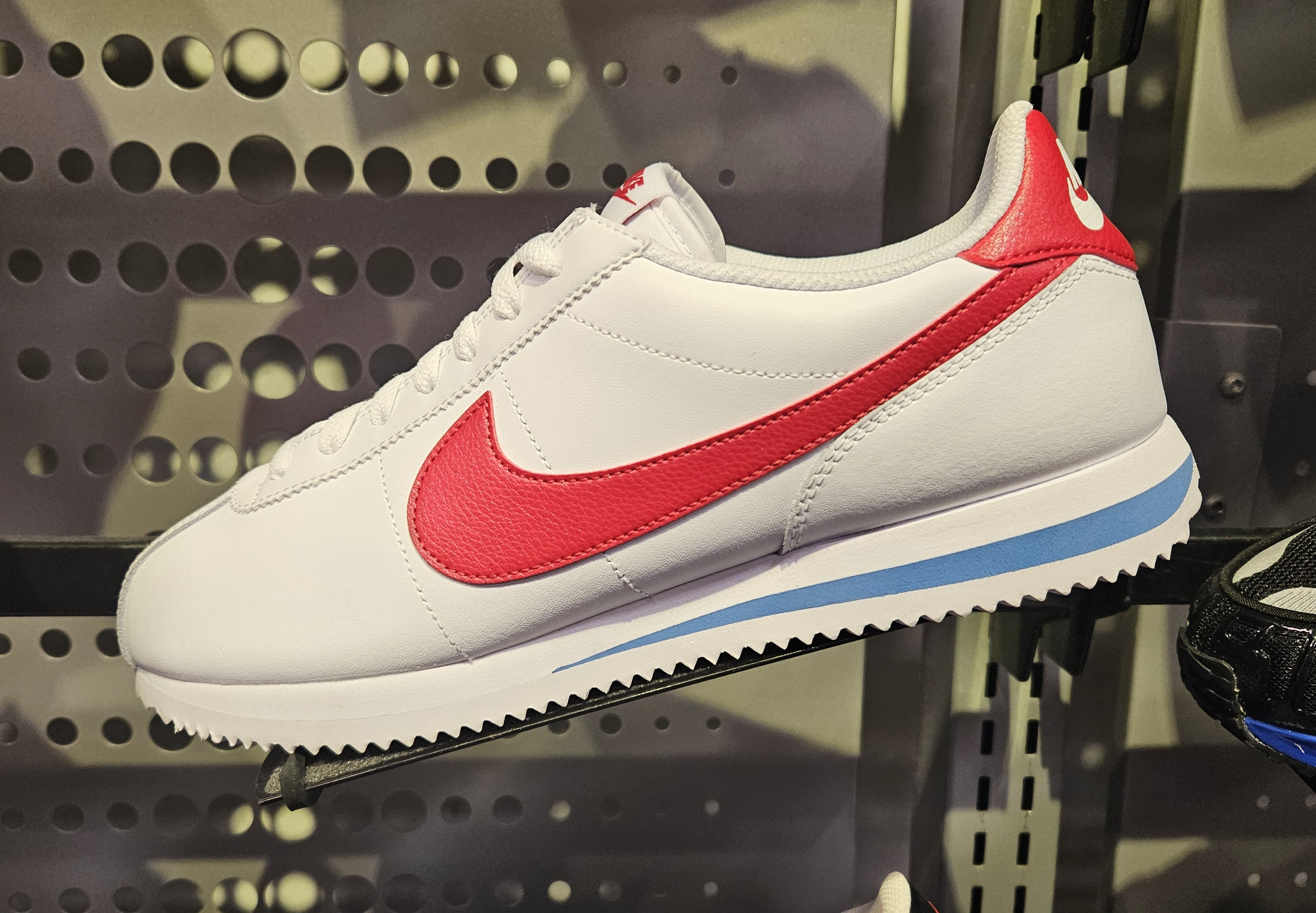
- Nike Cortez
- Type: Sneakers
- Inventor: Bill Bowerman
- Inception: 1972; 54 years ago
- Manufacturer: Nike, Inc.
- Website: nike.com/cortez-shoes

The Nike Cortez is the first running shoe released by Nike in 1972, and is therefore thought to be a significant aspect to the success of the company. The Cortez was first designed by Nike co-founder Bill Bowerman, aiming to produce a comfortable and durable running shoe for distance training and road running. The Nike Cortez was released at the peak of the 1972 Summer Olympics, and quickly gained interest by the general public. The shoe previously known as the Onitsuka Tiger Cortez was later renamed to the Onitsuka Tiger Corsair after Nike won a court battle to continue using the name in 1974.

== History ==
=== Initial partnerships ===
The Nike Cortez was created by Bill Bowerman and Phil Knight. The men first met in 1957: Bowerman was the track and field coach at the University of Oregon, and Knight competed on Bowerman's team. The two friends became business partners soon after Knight bought the distribution rights of Onitsuka Tiger brand athletic shoes from Japan for the USA. The initial name of their business was Blue Ribbon Sports and was later changed to Nike in 1972. Although the business was distributing decent athletic shoes, Bowerman believed that athletes deserved a better track shoe than what was available. After years of designing and experimenting, Bowerman finalized his image of the Nike Cortez in 1968, and in 1972 the shoe was released.

=== Name ===
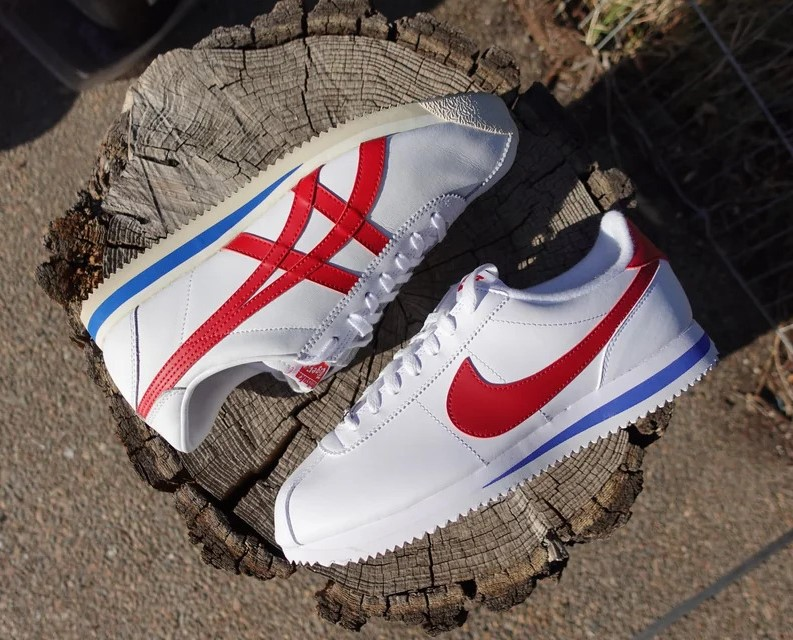
The Corsair and Cortez next to each other

The initial name for the shoe was "Mexico", which was derived from the 1968 Summer Olympics held in Mexico City. Once the Olympic Games came to an end, another name change on the shoe occurred, this time looking for something more catchy.

They decided on the name Aztec, but Adidas then threatened legal action because it was too similar to their own Azteca Gold track shoe. Soon thereafter they decided on the name "Cortez", which paid tribute to Hernán Cortés, the Spanish Conquistador who led an expedition that caused the fall of the Aztec Empire.

=== Impact on Nike ===
It is widely thought that the Nike Cortez was key to the success of Nike. The shoe was introduced to the general public at the peak of the 1972 Summer Olympics. Demand for the shoe grew drastically after the public noticed that the Nike Cortez was being used by the 1972 U.S. Olympic athletes. Sales reached $800,000 during the first year the shoe was released, which was a 100% sales increase over the 8,000 sales inquiries reached after the first year of selling the Tiger brand shoes. Nike ultimately would grow into a multi-billion dollar corporation conducting business in more than 160 countries while employing more than 35,000 people.

=== Association with gangs ===
The Nike Cortez is commonly worn by gangs in Los Angeles, notably MS-13. In January 2013, four Hispanic teenagers were targeted in a shooting in a Brentwood, California neighborhood after being asked why they were wearing Nike Cortez shoes. They were all injured.

== Design and features ==
The Nike Cortez has been redesigned numerous times. Early on, the shoe set the standard for running shoes. Co-founder and Olympic-class track trainer Bill Bowerman was set on designing a running shoe that provided both comfort and durability. The foam is measured to be generously placed in more significant parts of the shoe with intentions of offering comfort, absorbing road shock and providing other health benefits. The combination of these two soles reduces leg fatigue, raises the heel of the shoe to reduce Achilles tendon strains and provides maximum comfort. One of the world's leading marathoners described the Nike Cortez as "the most comfortable shoe ever."

The shoe is given a simple outer design that consists of the Nike swoosh symbol across the sides of the shoe and a streak across the lower portion of the outer sole. Leather was the first material used to construct the shoe, however, Bowerman soon realized that he could reduce the weight of the shoe if he changed the material of the shoe's upper to nylon and suede. In 2009, a new design of the Nike Cortez - the Cortez Fly Motion - was released. The Cortez Fly Motion instituted flywire: a lightweight thread made of Vectran placed in the upper of the shoe, which further reduced the weight of the shoe.

== In popular culture ==
Forrest Gump receives a pair of Nike Cortez in the 1994 film Forrest Gump, and becomes a famous runner wearing them.

The Nike Cortez are the preferred footwear of George Costanza, a character on the television series Seinfeld.
