= Onitsuka Tiger Corsair =

Line of shoes by Onitsuka Tiger

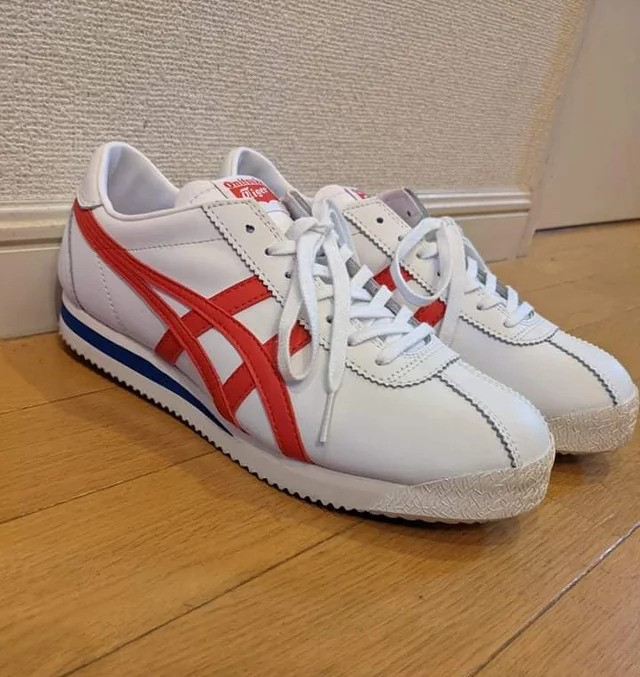
- Type: Sneakers
- Inventor: Onitsuka Tiger
- Inception: 1968; 58 years ago
- Manufacturer: Onitsuka Tiger
- Available: Yes
- Website: onitsukatiger.com

Onitsuka Tiger Corsair is a shoe that was designed under Onitsuka Tiger and released in 1968. The Onitsuka Tiger Corsair was first designed by Bill Bowerman while still in a partnership agreement with Onitsuka Tiger. Shortly after its release, Bowerman decided to part ways with the company and focus on developing original shoes for his own company, Nike, which led to Nike releasing its own version of the same shoe called the Nike Cortez.

== Overview ==
The idea for the shoe came after both Onitsuka Tiger and Blue Ribbon Sports saw massive success with the Mexico 66 shoe. Blue Ribbon Sports was specifically created to sell Onitsuka Tiger's shoes overseas in the United States and both companies wanted to continue its success by releasing another shoe. Bowerman came up with the idea for the shoe by taking two pieces from existing shoes, the midsole from the Spring Up and the outsole of the Limber Up, and combined them into one.

=== Name ===
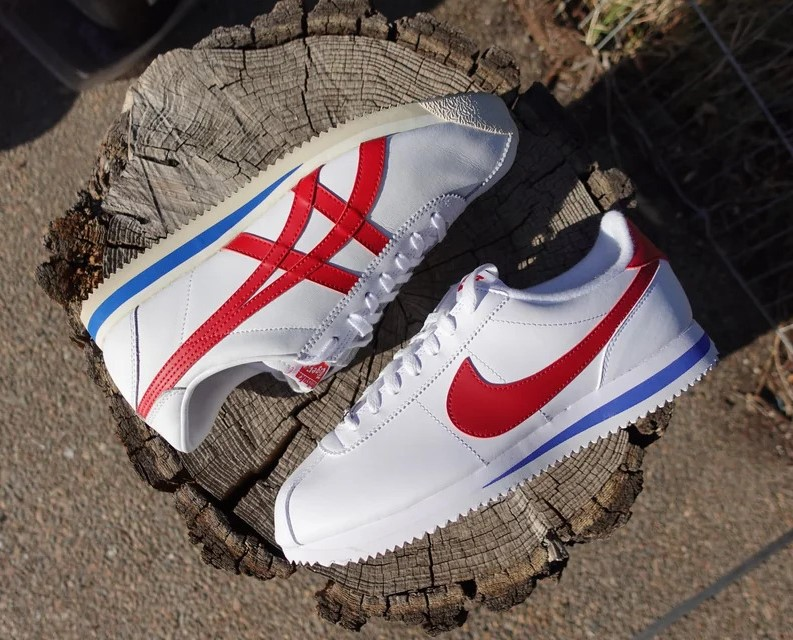
The Corsair and Cortez side by side

The name, Azteca, was first considered for the shoe but then Adidas threatened both companies with legal action since the name was too similar to one of their track shoes called the Adidas Azteca Gold. Bowerman asked who was the one who defeated the Aztecs and after being told it was Hernan Cortez, decided to name the shoes the Cortez. An offensive move in retrospect, the decision was made because he wanted to dominate Adidas in the market.

In 1971, the partnership between Onitsuka Tiger and BRS was broken and BRS decided to sell and make its own shoes under a new company name, Nike. This caused a problem as both companies were selling shoes with the same name, Cortez, and both went to court in a lengthy legal battle. Eventually in 1974, the court ruled in favor of Nike and they were given the right to sell their shoes under the Cortez name leading Onitsuka Tiger to rename their shoe the Corsair.
