= Onitsuka Tiger Mexico 66 =

Line of shoes by Onitsuka Tiger

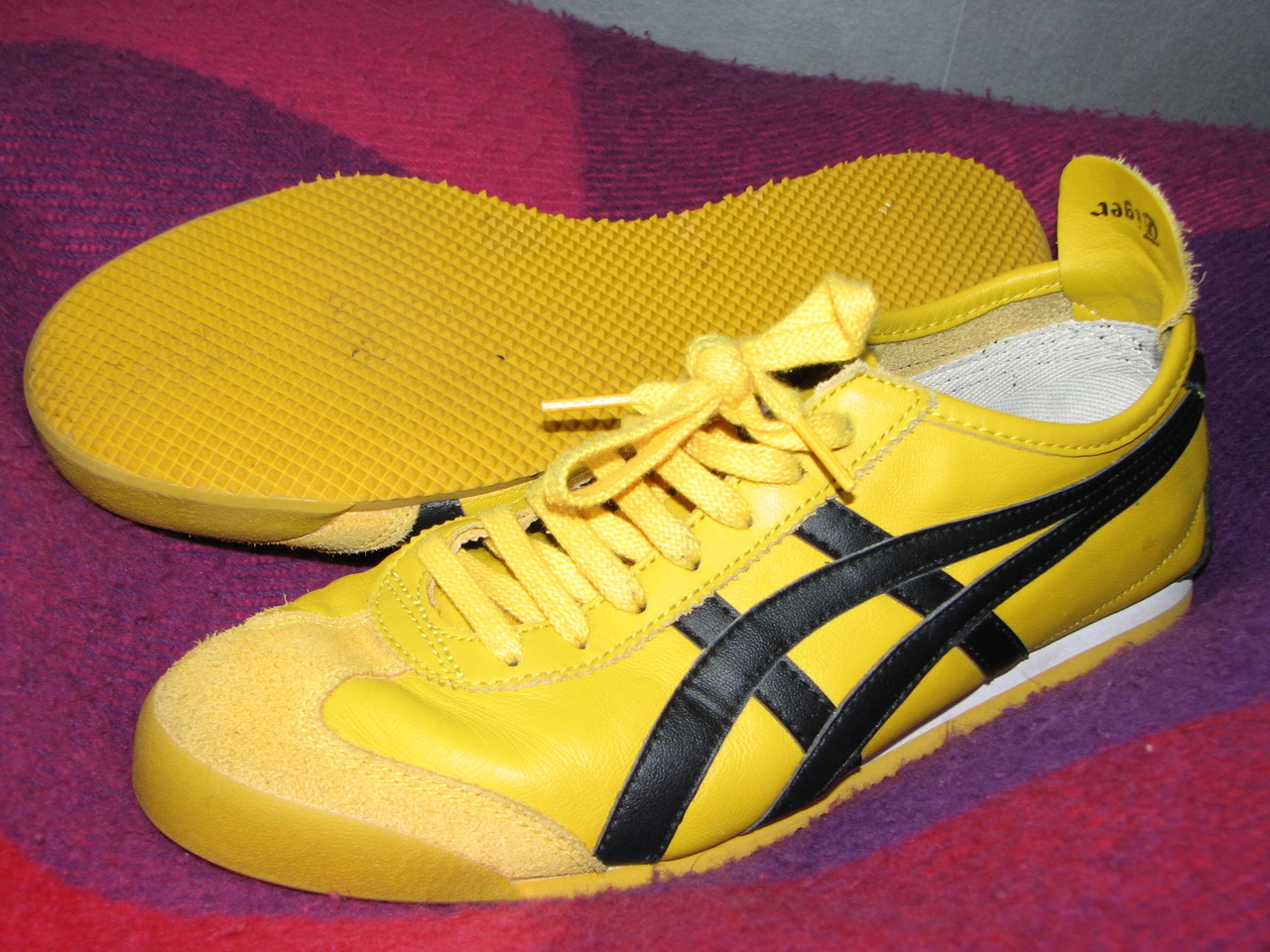
- Type: Sneakers
- Inventor: Onitsuka Tiger
- Inception: 1966; 60 years ago
- Manufacturer: Onitsuka Tiger
- Available: Yes
- Website: onitsukatiger.com

Onitsuka Tiger Mexico 66 is a line of shoes released by Onitsuka Tiger in 1966. The shoe was first developed to be used by athletes for the 1968 Summer Olympics. This is the first shoe to use the trademark "Tiger Stripes" that would be featured in Onitsuka Tiger and Asics shoes.

== Overview ==
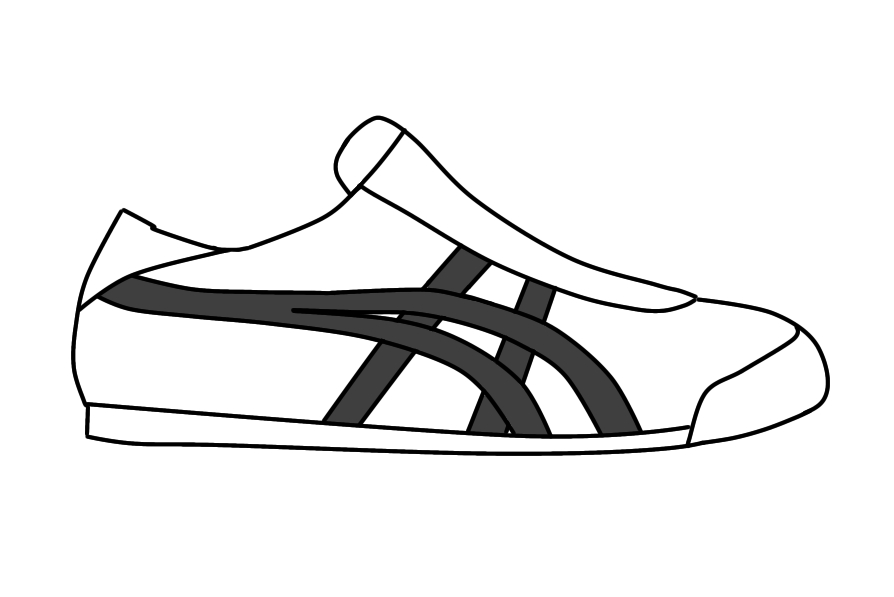
A diagram from 1966 of the "Tiger Stripes", then known as the Mexico Line (メキシコライン, Mekishiko Rain) while in development.

The origins of the shoe can be traced back to Onitsuka Tiger wanting to develop a flagship shoe to strengthen the company's brand. It did not have a well known shoe that could compete and help represent the company like some of its competitors from Adidas or Puma. It released the shoe two years before the Olympics in order to build buzz and the success of the athletes in competitions led to more athletes and even the Japanese national team using the shoes during the games.

== In popular culture ==
The shoe became popular after its use in the Bruce Lee film, Game of Death, where he wore a generic brand yellow and black pair that look similar to the Mexico 66s but have a different stripe design. The popularity of the film led to the shoe becoming popular outside of the running world and enter the mainstream market. The shoe would see a second boost in popularity with the release of Kill Bill: Volume 1 where the main character wore them as an homage to Bruce Lee's original film.

The early 2020s saw the shoe be cemented as a staple of sneaker culture with many celebrities and young consumers buying the shoes for its unique silhouette and fashionable colors. The resurgence of the shoe has helped Onitsuka Tiger and Asics compete with companies like Nike and Adidas in the lifestyle market.
