= Bill Bowerman =

American track and field coach and Nike co-founder (1911–1999)

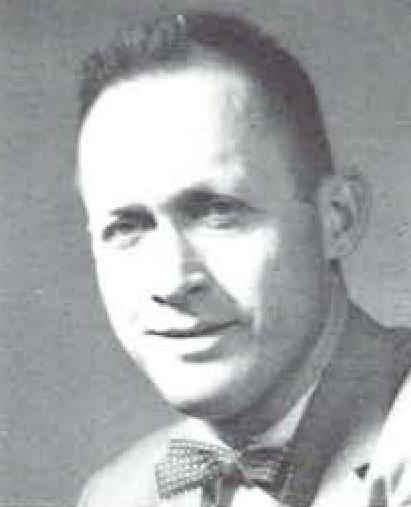
- Born: William Jay Bowerman; February 19, 1911; Portland, Oregon, U.S.
- Died: December 24, 1999 (aged 88); Fossil, Oregon, U.S.
- Education: University of Oregon
- Occupations: Coach; Co-founder of Nike
- Spouse: Barbara Young Bowerman (m. 1936)
- Children: Jon Bowerman; William J. "Jay" Bowerman, Jr. Thomas Bowerman
- Parent: Jay Bowerman
- Military career
- Branch: United States Army
- Service years: 1942–1945
- Rank: Major
- Conflicts: World War II
- Awards: Silver Star; Bronze Star (4)

William Jay Bowerman (February 19, 1911 – December 24, 1999) was an American track and field coach and co-founder of Nike. Over his career, he trained 31 Olympic athletes, 51 All-Americans, 12 American record-holders, 22 NCAA champions and 16 sub-4 minute milers.

Bowerman disliked being called a coach, and during his 24 years at the University of Oregon, the Ducks track and field team had a winning season every year but one, attained 4 NCAA titles, and finished in the top 10 in the nation sixteen times. As co-founder of Nike, he invented some of their top brands, including the Cortez and Waffle Trainer, and assisted in the company moving from being a distributor of other shoe brands to one creating their own shoes in house.

== Early life ==
Born in Portland, Oregon, in 1911. Bowerman's father Jay was a former Governor of Oregon; his mother, Elizabeth Hoover Bowerman, had grown up in Fossil, Oregon. The family returned to Fossil after the parents divorced in 1913. Bowerman had an older brother and sister, Dan and Mary Elizabeth "Beth"; and a twin brother, Thomas, who died in an elevator accident when he was two years old.

Bowerman attended Medford, Oregon, and Seattle schools before returning to Medford for high school. He played in the high school band and for the state-champion football team in his junior and senior years. Bowerman first met Barbara Young, the woman he married, while a high school student in Medford.

In 1929, Bowerman attended the University of Oregon to play football and study journalism. At the suggestion of longtime track coach Bill Hayward, he also joined the track team. He was a member of Beta Theta Pi fraternity. After graduating, he taught biology and coached football at Franklin High School in Portland in 1934. In 1935, Bowerman moved back to Medford High School to teach and coach football, during which time the Black Tornado won the 1940 state championship.

Bowerman married Barbara Young on June 22, 1936. Their marriage produced three children.

=== Military career ===
Bowerman had been in the ROTC and Army Reserve, and then joined the United States Army as a 2nd Lieutenant in the days following the Pearl Harbor attack. He was assigned to Fort Lawton in Washington and served a year there before being assigned to the 86th Mountain Infantry Regiment at Camp Hale in Leadville, Colorado. He was in the 87th Mountain Infantry Regiment, the regiment became a part of the 10th Mountain Division.

Bowerman's duty entailed organizing the troops' supplies and maintaining the mules used to carry the supplies in the mountains. On December 23, 1944, the division arrived in Naples, Italy, and soon moved north to the mountains of northern Italy. During his overseas service, Bowerman was promoted to commander of the 86th Regiment's First Battalion at the rank of Major. Bowerman negotiated a stand-down of German forces near the Brenner Pass in the days before the surrender of the German army in all of Italy. For his service, Bowerman received the Silver Star and four Bronze Stars. He was honorably discharged in October 1945.

== Coaching career ==
After the war, Bowerman returned to his position at Medford High School. The family then moved to Eugene, where he became the head track coach at his alma mater, the University of Oregon, on July 1, 1948.

=== University of Oregon ===
Bowerman's "Men of Oregon" won 24 NCAA individual titles (with wins in 15 of the 19 events contested) and four NCAA team crowns (1962, 1964, 1965, and 1970), and posted 16 top-10 NCAA finishes in 24 years as head coach. His teams also boasted 33 Olympians, 38 conference champions and 64 All-Americans. At the dual level, the Ducks posted a 114–20 record and went undefeated in 10 seasons. In addition, Bowerman coached the world record setting 4-mile (6.4 km) relay team in 1962. This team consisted of Archie San Romani, Dyrol Burleson, Vic Reeve, and Keith Forman with a time of 16:08.9. Six years later, an Oregon Track Club team of Roscoe Divine, Wade Bell, Arne Kvalheim and Dave Wilborn improved the record to 16:05.0. Among athletes that Bowerman coached are: Otis Davis, Steve Prefontaine, Kenny Moore, Bill Dellinger, Mac Wilkins, Jack Hutchins, Dyrol Burleson, Harry Jerome, Sig Ohlemann, Les Tipton, Gerry Moro, Wade Bell, Dave Edstrom, Roscoe Divine, Matt Centrowitz, Arne Kvalheim, Jim Grelle, Bruce Mortenson, Phil Knight and Mel Renfro. Renfro was a track and football All-American, had a successful NFL career with the Dallas Cowboys and is in the Pro Football Hall of Fame.

Bowerman disliked being called a coach; he saw himself as more of a teacher. He expected his squad to excel in the classroom, and urged his charges to apply the lessons they learned on the track to everyday life.

In 1972, Bowerman stepped back from day-to-day coaching activities to conduct fundraising for renovating the Hayward Field grandstands that would be necessary for the consideration of hosting the U.S. Olympic Trials again in 1976. He also ran unsuccessfully for a House seat in the Oregon Legislature in 1970 as a Republican, losing by only 815 votes out of 61,000 cast.

Bowerman officially retired as head coach on March 23, 1973, and his assistant coach Bill Dellinger was immediately promoted.

=== United States Olympic Track program ===
Bowerman created a training program for adjusting athletes for the high altitude that they would experience at the 1968 Mexico City Olympic Games. This successful program led to his selection as the 1972 Munich Olympic track and field head coaching position, even though American miler favorite Jim Ryun lost to Kenyan Kip Keino, citing altitude as part of the reason for this upset. Bowerman coached members of teams from Norway, Canada, Australia, and the United States.

During the Munich Massacre at the 1972 Olympics in West Germany, where Bowerman was frequently blamed for a dismal performance by the U.S. track team, Israeli race walker Shaul Ladany escaped the PLO terrorists, and then awakened Bowerman and alerted the West German police. Bowerman called the U.S. consulate for a detachment of Marines to protect the U.S. Olympic compound, in which lived two high-profile Jewish athletes: swimmer Mark Spitz and javelin thrower Bill Schmidt.

== Running ==
During a trip to New Zealand in 1962, Bowerman was introduced to the concept of running as a fitness routine, including people of an advanced age, through a running club organized by his friend and coaching colleague Arthur Lydiard. Bowerman brought this concept back to the United States, and began to write articles and books about running. He also created a running program in Eugene that became a national model for fitness programs. A Jogger's Manual, a three-page guide, was published shortly after Bowerman returned from New Zealand. In 1966, along with cardiologist W.E. Harris, Bowerman published a 90-page book titled Jogging. The book sold over a million copies and was credited with igniting the jogging phenomenon in the United States. The new crop of older athletic people contributed to the evolution of the sport of track and field to create a new division for these masters athletes. Due to the popularity of Jogging, Harris and Bowerman published a 127-page book in 1967.

Athletics West is an American running team formed by Bill Bowerman, Phil Knight and Geoff Hollister in 1977. At the time, America had no definitive running program for young athletes to continue competing outside of college. The formation and success of Athletics West, together with the success and popularity of American runners like Craig Virgin (charter member), Steve Prefontaine, Frank Shorter and Bill Rodgers helped inspire the 1970s running boom.

== Nike ==
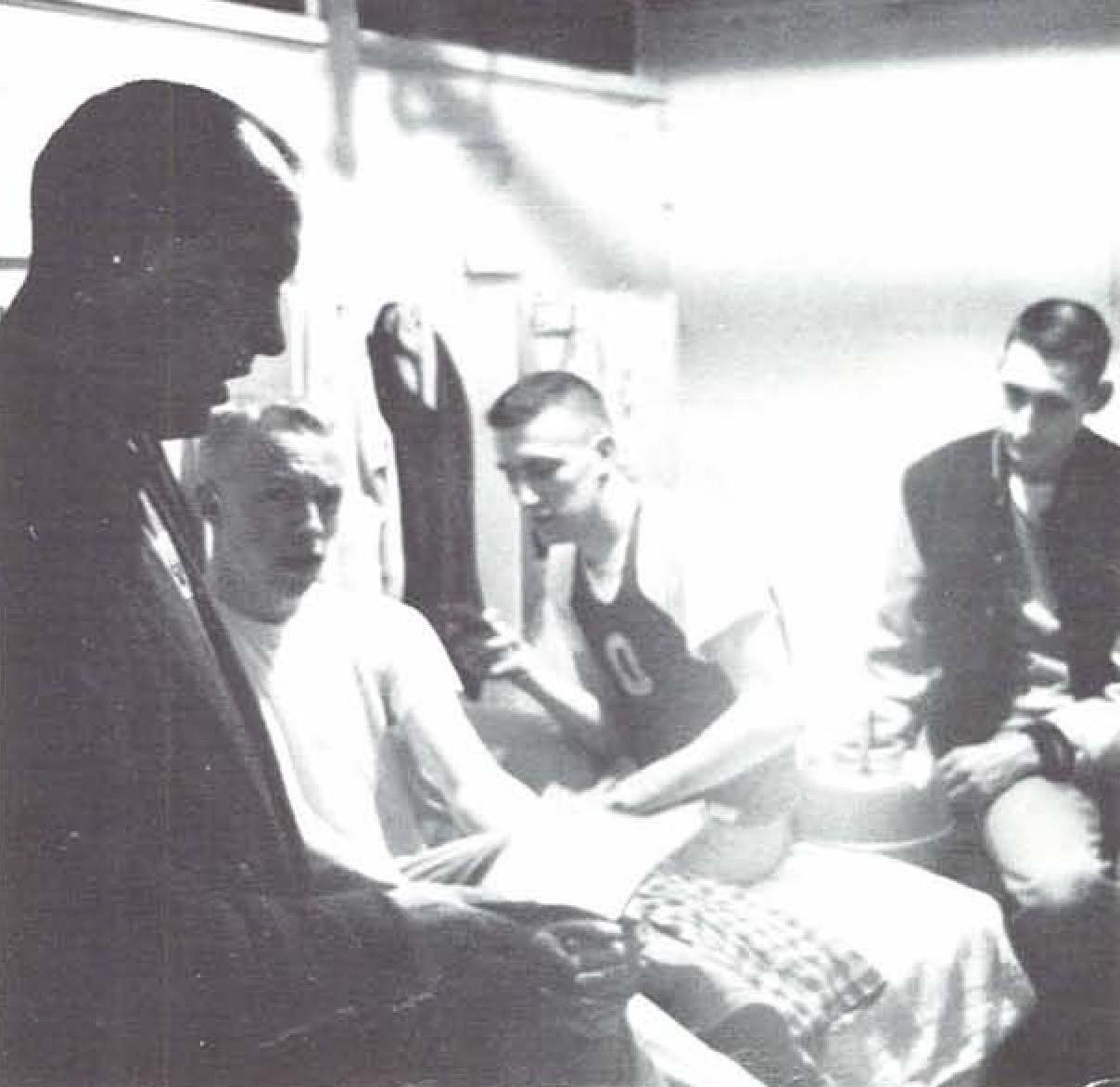
Bowerman (left) conversing with Phil Knight and two other members of the Oregon track team in 1958

According to Otis Davis, a student athlete who Bowerman coached at the University of Oregon, who later went on to win two gold medals at the 1960 Summer Olympics, he was one of the guinea pigs for whom Bowerman customized shoes prior to being a cofounder of Nike. Davis stated, "I didn't like the way they felt on my feet. There was no support and they were too tight. But I saw Bowerman make them from the waffle iron, and they were mine."

In 1964, Bowerman entered into a handshake agreement with Phil Knight, who had been a miler under him in the 1950s, to start an athletic footwear distribution company called Blue Ribbon Sports, later known as Nike, Inc. Knight managed the business end of the partnership, while Bowerman experimented with improvements in athletic footwear design. Bowerman stayed in Eugene, keeping his coaching job at the University of Oregon, while Knight operated the main office from Portland. Bowerman and Knight initially began importing the Onitsuka Tiger running shoes from Japan to sell in the United States. Initially, the partnership was 50-50, but shortly afterwards Bowerman wanted it changed to 51–49, with Knight having the higher ownership. He did this to avoid potential gridlock and have one of them be in charge of final decisions.

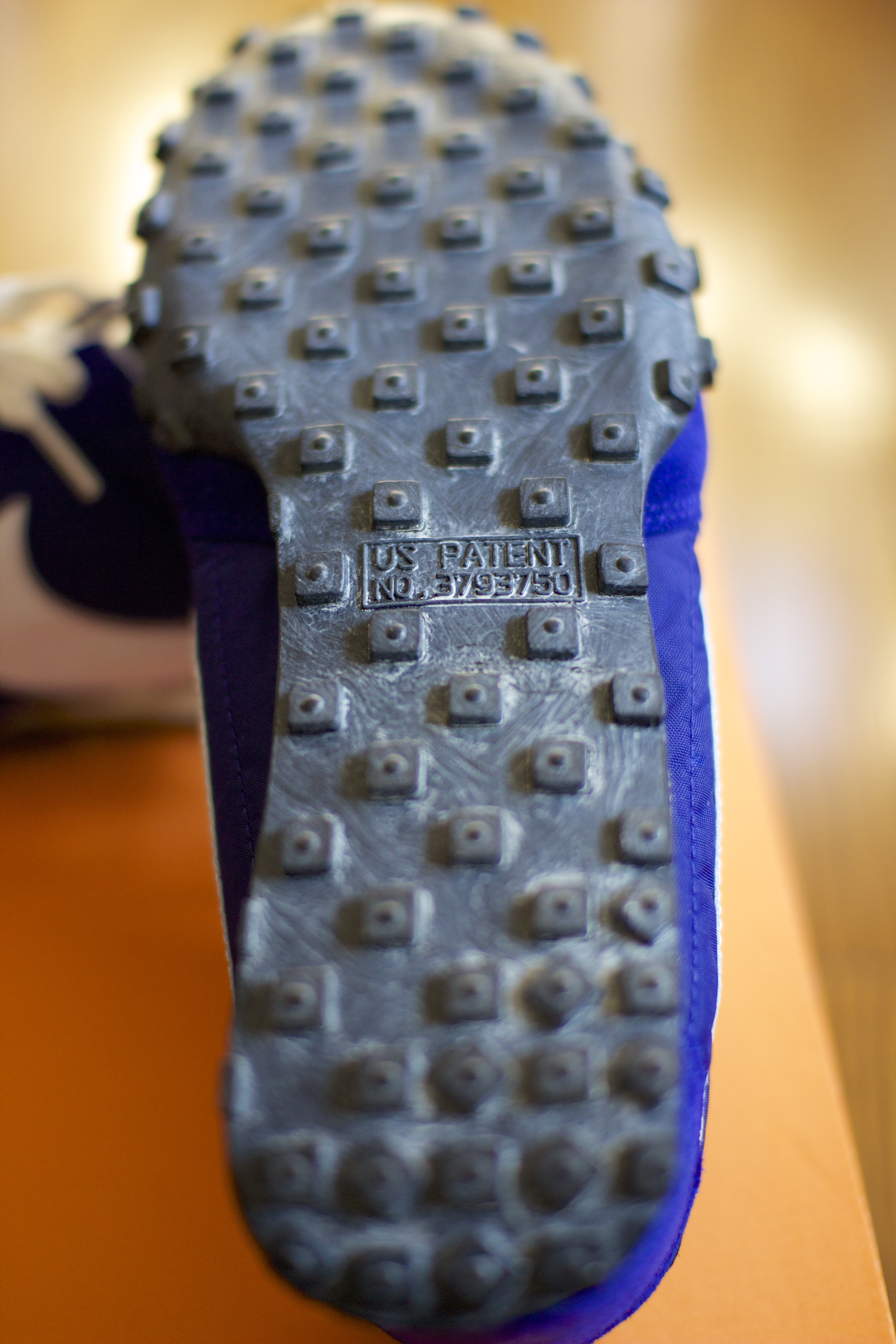
Nike Waffle Trainer

Bowerman's design ideas led to the creation of a running shoe in 1966 that was ultimately named "Nike Cortez" in 1968, which quickly became a top-seller and remains one of Nike's most iconic footwear designs. Bowerman designed several Nike shoes, but is best known for ruining his wife's Belgian waffle iron in 1970 or 1971, experimenting with the idea of using waffle-ironed rubber to create a new sole for footwear that would grip but be lightweight. Bowerman's design inspiration led to the introduction of the so-called "Moon Shoe" in 1972, so named because the waffle tread was said to resemble the footprints left by astronauts on the Moon. Further refinement resulted in the "Waffle Trainer" in 1974, which helped fuel the explosive growth of Blue Ribbon Sports/Nike. While Bowerman was experimenting with shoe design, he worked in a small, unventilated space, using glue and solvents with toxic components that caused him severe nerve damage. The nerve damage to his lower legs left him with significant mobility problems; as Kenny Moore notes in his book, Bowerman and the Men of Oregon, that Bowerman had rendered himself unable to run in the shoes that he had given the world.

Bowerman was obsessed with shaving weight off his athletes' running shoes. He believed that custom-made shoes would weigh less on the feet of his runners and cut down on blisters, as well as reduce the overall drag on their energy for every ounce he could remove from the shoe. By his estimation, removing one ounce (28 g) from a shoe, based on a six-foot gait for a runner, would translate in a reduction of 55 pounds (25 kg) of lift over a one-mile (1.6 km) span.

Knight once said of Bowerman's importance to the company, "If coach (Bowerman) isn't happy, Nike isn't happy."

Bowerman reduced his role with the company in the late 1970s.

== Legacy ==
Bowerman is a member of the National Distance Running Hall of Fame, the USA National Track and Field Hall of Fame, the Oregon Sports Hall of Fame, Oregon's Athletic Hall of Fame, the RRCA Distance Running Hall of Fame, and the National Inventors Hall of Fame. His statue and stopwatch grace the northwest corner of Hayward Field, home of the Prefontaine Classic at the University of Oregon. A biographical film, Without Limits, about the relationship between record-breaking distance runner Steve Prefontaine and his coach Bill Bowerman was made in 1998, and Bill Bowerman was played by Donald Sutherland. The headquarters for Nike is located on Bowerman Drive in homage to the company's co-founder. Also in his honor, the company created the "Bowerman Series" of performance running shoes, designed to provide longer-lasting, more training-focused products to compete with such running brands as Asics and Saucony.

In 2009, the U.S. Track & Field and Cross Country Coaches Association created The Bowerman, an award that is given to the most outstanding collegiate male and female track & field athlete in a given calendar year. Inaugural winners of the award were Oregon's Galen Rupp and Colorado's Jenny Barringer. The Bowerman trophy was designed by Tinker Hatfield, a Nike employee and former Oregon student-athlete coached by Bowerman.

== Death ==
In declining health in late 1999, Bowerman died at age 88 at his home at an assisted care facility in Fossil, Oregon.

== See also ==
- List of teachers portrayed in films
- Without Limits

== Sources ==
- Moore, Kenny (2006). Bowerman and the Men of Oregon. Emmaus, Pennsylvania: Rodale. ISBN 978-1-59486-190-1.
- Bowerman, William J (1991). High-performance training for track and field. Champaign, Ill.: Leisure Press. ISBN 0-88011-390-1.
- Freeman, William H. (1972). A biographical study of William Jay Bowerman.
- Greenberg, Keith (1994). Bill Bowerman & Phil Knight: Building the Nike Empire. Blackbirch Press. ISBN 978-1-56711-085-2.
