= Dyrol Burleson =

American middle-distance runner

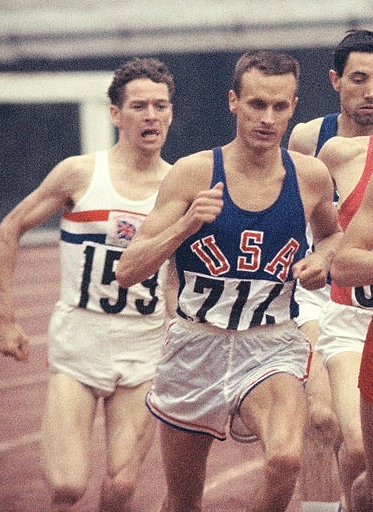
- Burleson (right) at the 1964 Olympics

Personal information
- Full name: Dyrol Jay Burleson
- Born: April 27, 1940 (age 86) Cottage Grove, Oregon, U.S.
- Height: 6 ft 2 in (1.87 m)
- Weight: 159 lb (72 kg)

Sport
- Sport: Athletics
- Event: 1500 m
- Club: Oregon Track Club
- Coached by: Bill Bowerman

Achievements and titles
- Personal bests: 880 yd – 1:48.2 (1962); 1500 m – 3:38.8 (1964); 1 mile – 3:55.6 (1963); 2 miles – 8:39.6 (1966)
Medal record
Representing the United States
Pan American Games
| Gold medal – first place | 1959 Chicago | 1500 metres |

Dyrol Jay Burleson (born April 27, 1940) is a retired middle-distance runner from the United States. He attended the University of Oregon, where he ran track under the coach Bill Bowerman. Burleson lettered in track and field in 1960, 1961, and 1962. He won the AAU 1500 m title in 1959, 1961 and 1963, and the NCAA title in the 1500 m in 1960, and in the mile in 1961–62. Burleson was Pan American champion in 1959, and in May 1962 he anchored the Oregon 4×mile relay team that set a new world record.

In 2010 Burleson was inducted into the National Track and Field Hall of Fame.

Burleson also is a member of the Cottage Grove High School Hall of Fame and holds the 1500m record in track and field at the high school.

== Accomplishments ==
- 1960 Summer Olympic Games 1500 meters: 3:40.9 (6th place)
- 1964 Summer Olympic Games 1500 meters: 3:40.0 (5th place)
- 1960 American Record holder 1500 meters : 3:41.3
- 1960 American Record holder 1500 meters : 3:40.9
- 1960 American Record holder 1 Mile : 3:58.6
- 1961 American Record holder 1 Mile : 3:57.6
