= Statue of Bill Bowerman =

2000 sculpture by Diana Lee Jackson in Eugene, Oregon, U.S.

Bill Bowerman
- The sculpture in 2015
- Artist: Diana Lee Jackson
- Year: 2000
- Type: Sculpture
- Subject: Bill Bowerman
- Location: Eugene, Oregon, United States; 44.04282°N 123.07134°W

Bill Bowerman is an outdoor 2000 sculpture of the American track and field coach of the same name by Diana Lee Jackson, installed outside the Bowerman Family Building, in the corner of Hayward Field, on the University of Oregon campus in Eugene, Oregon, in the United States.

Bowerman co-founded the American multinational corporation Nike, Inc.; Jackson was a Nike employee. The statue was installed on June 21, 2000.

== See also ==
- 2000 in art
