= Asics =

Japanese sportswear company

ASICS Corporation

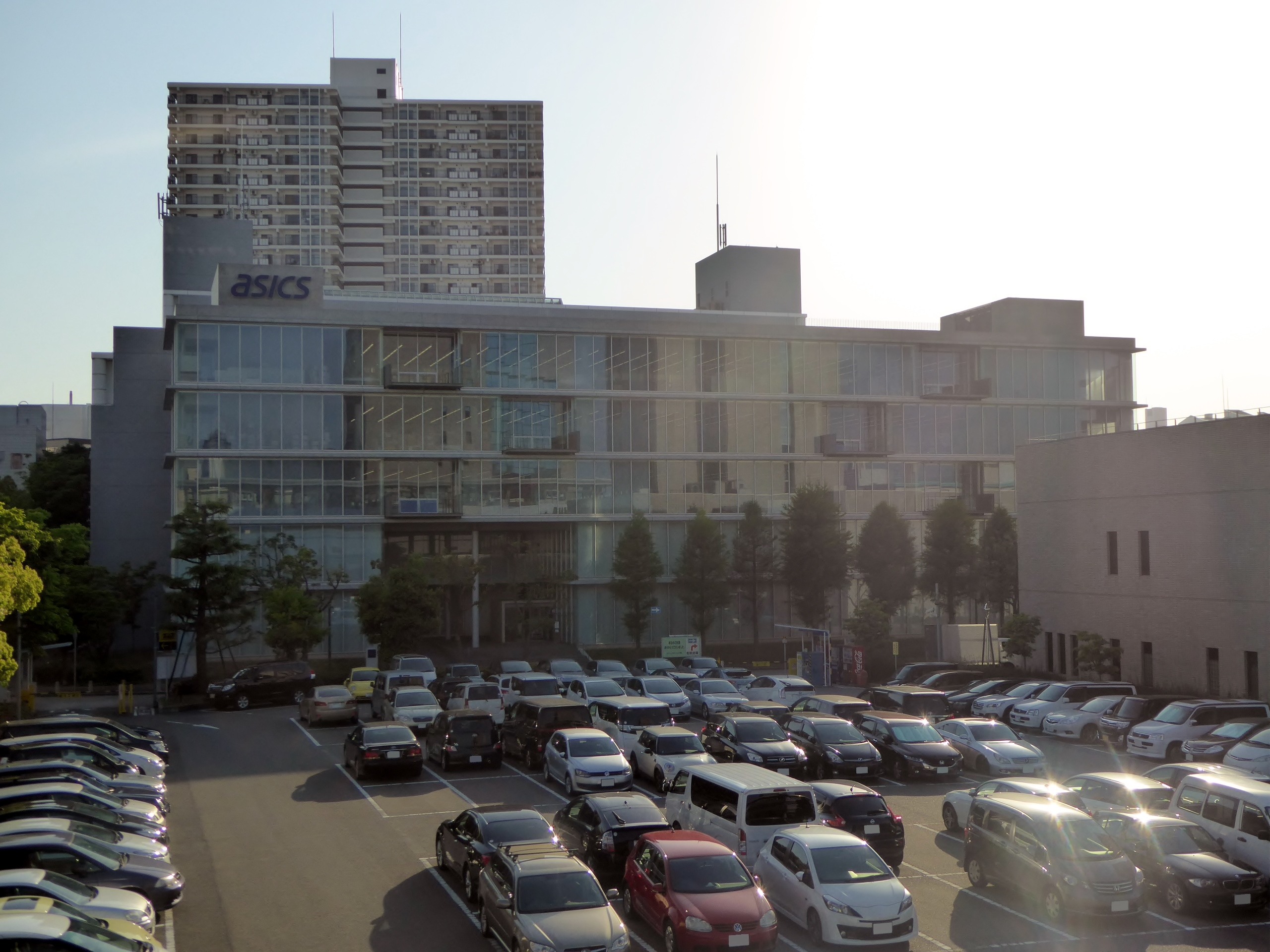
- World headquarters in Kobe, Japan
- Native name: 株式会社アシックス
- Romanized name: Kabushiki gaisha Ashikkusu
- Type: Public (K.K.)
- Traded as: TYO: 7936
- Industry: Sports equipment, sportswear
- Founded: September 1, 1949; 77 years ago
- Founder: Kihachiro Onitsuka
- Headquarters: Kobe, Japan
- Area served: Worldwide
- Key people: Yasuhito Hirota (Chairman and CEO); Mitsuyuki Tominaga (President and COO)
- Products: Footwear, apparel, sports equipment
- Brands: Onitsuka Tiger
- Revenue: ▲¥810.9 billion (2025)
- Operating income: ▲¥142.5 billion (2025)
- Net income: ▲¥98.7 billion (2025)
- Number of employees: 9,455 (2025)
- Subsidiaries: OT GROUP Corporation; Race Roster; Runkeeper
- Website: asics.com

ASICS Corporation (Japanese: 株式会社アシックス, Hepburn: Kabushiki gaisha Ashikkusu), commonly known as Asics (/ˈæsɪks/, /ˈɑːsɪks/ or /ˈeɪsɪks/), is a Japanese multinational sportswear company headquartered in Kobe, Hyōgo Prefecture. It manufactures athletic and lifestyle footwear, apparel and sports equipment, and is particularly known for its running shoes. Performance Running is its largest product category; its other businesses include Core Performance Sports, SportStyle, apparel, walking shoes and the Onitsuka Tiger brand.

The company traces its origins to a sporting-shoe business established by Kihachiro Onitsuka in Kobe in 1949. Onitsuka Co., Ltd. merged with GTO Co., Ltd. and Jelenk Co., Ltd. in 1977 to form ASICS Corporation. The name is an acronym of the Latin phrase anima sana in corpore sano, which the company renders as "a sound mind in a sound body". The company conducts sports-science research and product development through the ASICS Institute of Sport Science in Kobe, including research underlying products such as the METASPEED racing-shoe series. Its early U.S. distributor, Blue Ribbon Sports, later became Nike, Inc.

In fiscal year 2025, Asics reported net sales of ¥810.9 billion, operating profit of ¥142.5 billion and profit attributable to owners of the parent of ¥98.7 billion, all record highs.

== History ==
=== Origins and formation of ASICS ===
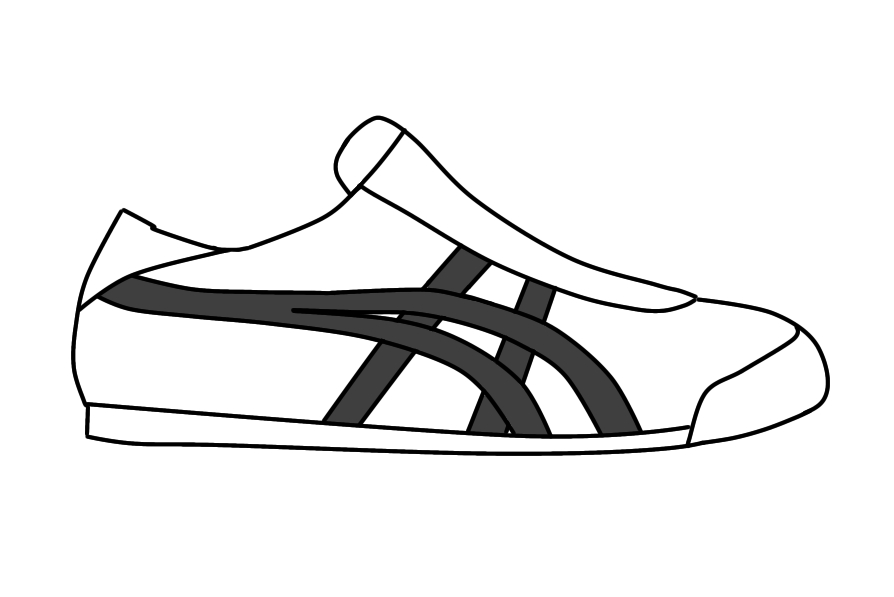
A diagram of the original Tiger Stripes design for the Mexico 66 model. Originally known as the Mexico Line (メキシコライン, Mekishiko Rain), it is used by both Asics and its lifestyle brand, Onitsuka Tiger.

Kihachiro Onitsuka established Onitsuka Shokai in Kobe in 1949. In the same year, the business was reorganized as Onitsuka Co., Ltd., initially with two employees. The company's official founding date is September 1, 1949. Onitsuka began by developing basketball shoes, releasing its first model in 1950, and subsequently expanded into footwear for running, wrestling, volleyball and other sports.

In 1966, Onitsuka introduced the crossed-stripe design known as the Mexico Line, which later became a visual identifier of Onitsuka Tiger and Asics footwear. Onitsuka became particularly known for the Mexico 66 design, and martial artist Bruce Lee helped popularize the company's footwear internationally.

During the 1960s, Onitsuka developed a U.S. distribution relationship with Blue Ribbon Sports, the company founded by Phil Knight and Bill Bowerman that later became Nike, Inc. In 1969, Onitsuka introduced the Cortez training shoe for the U.S. market; the related Onitsuka model was later marketed as the Tiger Corsair.

Onitsuka expanded its overseas operations during the 1970s. In 1975 it established Onitsuka Tiger GmbH in Düsseldorf, West Germany, as its European base. On July 21, 1977, Onitsuka Co., Ltd., fishing and sporting-goods company GTO Co., Ltd., and sportswear manufacturer Jelenk Co., Ltd. merged on an equal basis to form ASICS Corporation. Kihachiro Onitsuka became president of the new company. The ASICS and ASICS Tiger brands were introduced at the time of the merger, and the company broadened its position in the running market with models including the Montreal II and Enduro.

=== International expansion and diversification ===
Asics continued expanding its overseas operations and running-shoe business during the 1980s and 1990s. It established ASICS Tiger Oceania Pty. Ltd. in Sydney in 1986 and ASICS Europe B.V. in Amsterdam in 1994. During the same period, the company developed several long-running performance-footwear series, including the GEL-KAYANO and GT-2000 in 1993 and GEL-NIMBUS in 1999.

In 2002, Asics revived the Onitsuka Tiger brand, reissuing models such as the Mexico 66, Ultimate 81 and Nippon 60 as lifestyle products and expanding the brand internationally. The first directly managed Onitsuka Tiger store opened in Tokyo in 2003, followed by stores in European cities including Paris, London, Berlin and Amsterdam. In 2007, the first ASICS-branded specialty running store, ASICS Store Tokyo, opened, followed by stores in London and New York. In April 2008, Motoi Oyama became president and representative director of Asics.

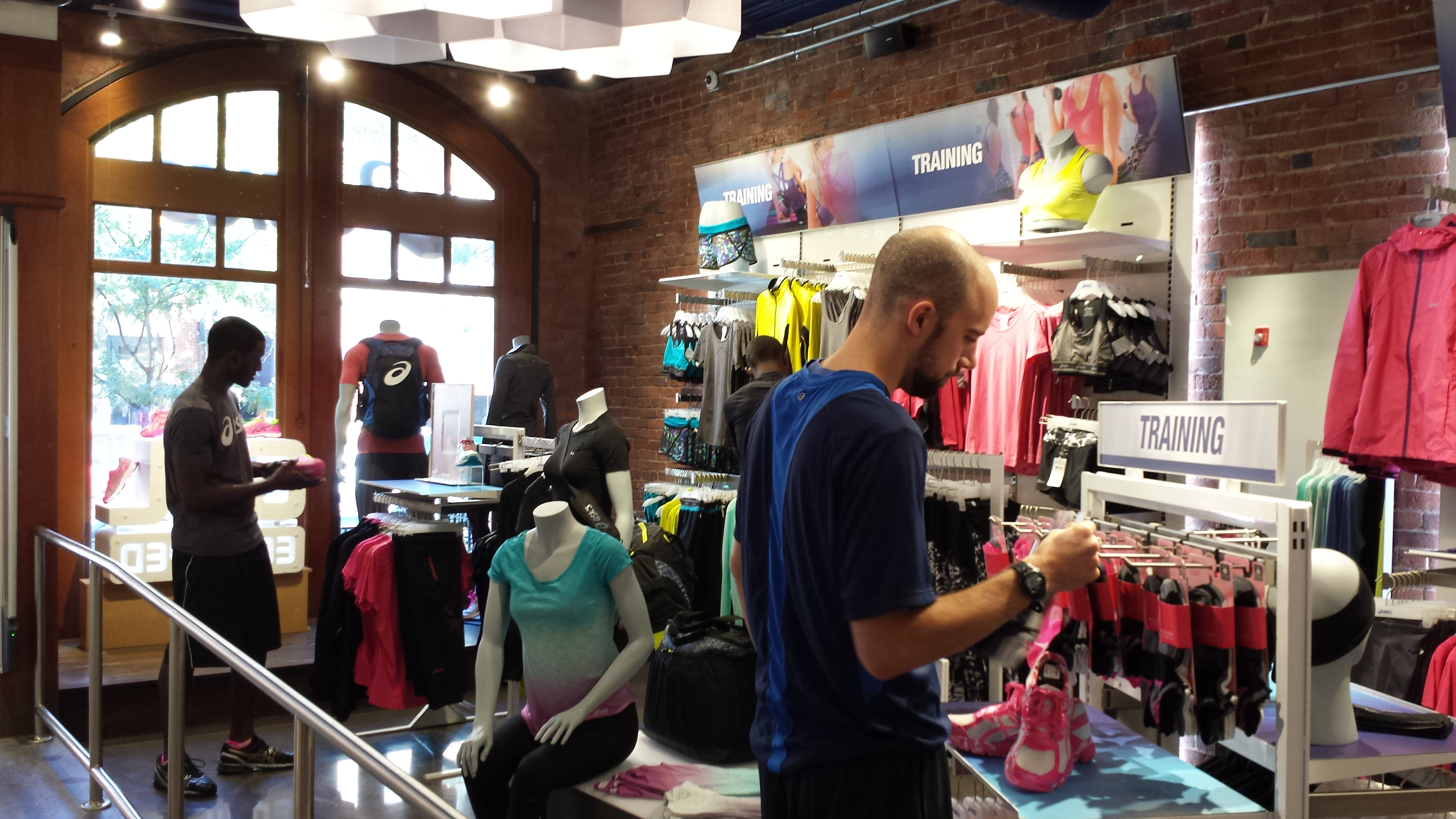
Interior of an Asics store on Newbury Street in the Back Bay neighborhood of Boston, Massachusetts

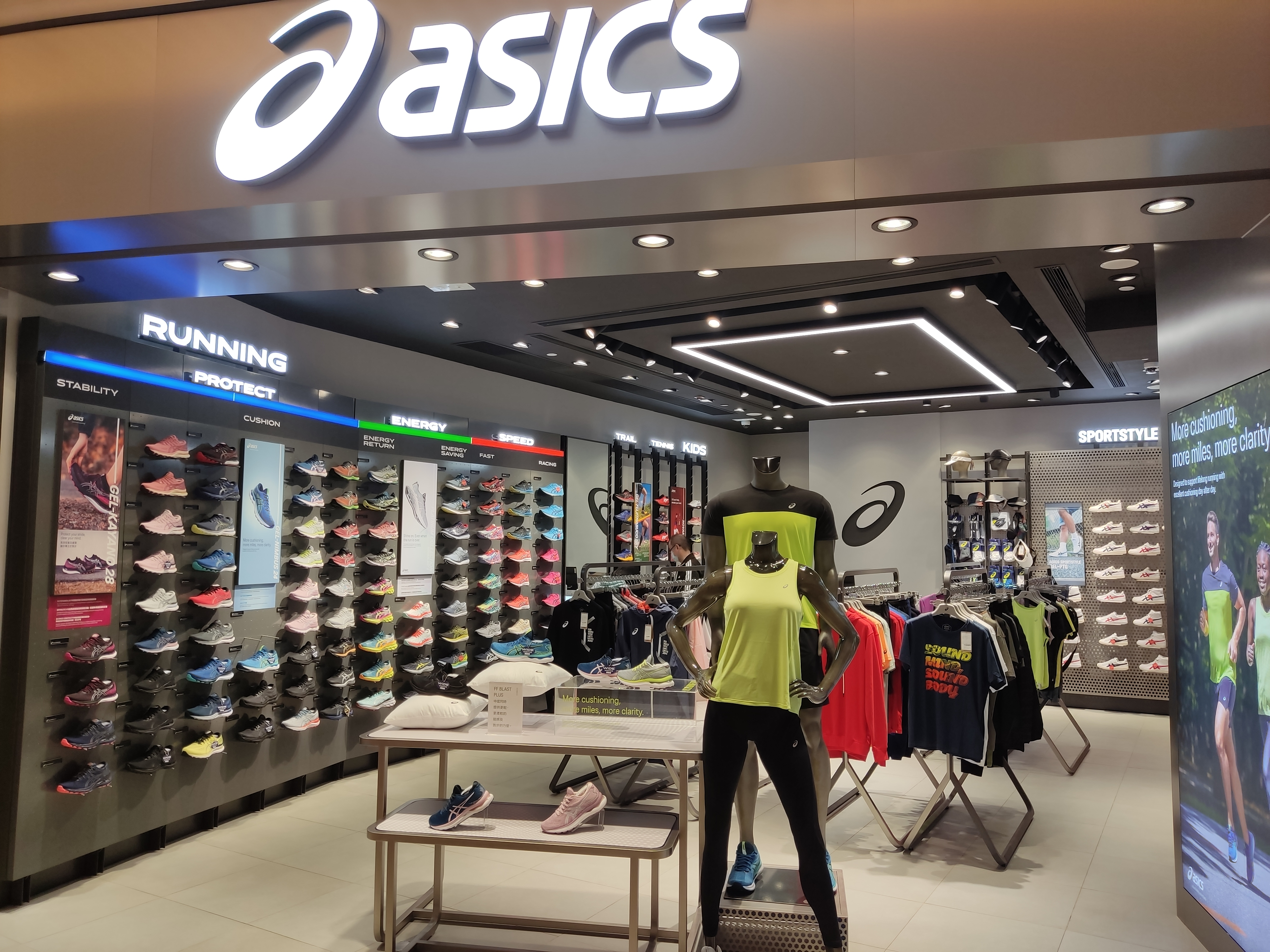
An Asics store in the new towns of Hong Kong

Asics bought the Swedish outdoor brand Haglöfs for ¥11.4 billion ($128.7 million) on July 12, 2010. In 2015, Asics reissued the ASICSTIGER brand with a full product range aimed at the expanding sports-lifestyle market.

In January 2016, Windsor Financial Group LLC, which operated Asics retail stores in the United States, filed for Chapter 11 bankruptcy protection amid a legal dispute with Asics.

In February 2016, Asics acquired Fitness Keeper, Inc., operator of the fitness-tracking app Runkeeper, as a wholly owned subsidiary. In October 2019, Asics acquired Race Roster, a Canadian race-registration platform, which joined the portfolio of ASICS Digital.

In March 2021, Asics launched Unoha (ウノハ), a lifestyle brand oriented toward women and emphasizing environmentally conscious materials. The brand primarily sold online and through temporary pop-up stores. Asics discontinued Unoha in June 2024, about three years after its launch.

LionRock Capital Limited acquired a 100% interest in Haglöfs from Asics on December 18, 2023.

=== Restructuring and renewed growth ===
Asics lost ground in performance running and experienced declining sales during much of the late 2010s.

In March 2018, Yasuhito Hirota became president, COO and representative director, while Oyama continued as chairman, CEO and a representative director. During Hirota's presidency, Asics introduced a category-based business management structure and established the China Division and Onitsuka Tiger Company.

The company's three-year Medium Term Management Plan 2023, launched in 2021, placed greater emphasis on technical improvements to performance-running footwear and on creating a clearer range of shoes for different types of runners. In March 2022, Hirota additionally took on the role of CEO while continuing as president, COO and representative director, while Oyama became chairman and a director. By fiscal 2023, operating profit had reached ¥54.2 billion, compared with a ¥25 billion target originally set for the management-plan period.

On January 1, 2024, Mitsuyuki Tominaga became president and COO, while Hirota became chairman, CEO and representative director and Oyama became senior advisor and a director. Tominaga was elected a director and representative director on March 22, while Oyama retired as a director on the same date. Before becoming president, Tominaga had overseen the company's IT and digital divisions and served as its CDO and CIO.

The company's profitability benefited from changes in its sales mix. In 2024, The Wall Street Journal reported that Asics had shifted toward more premium-priced products, increased the proportion of sales made directly to consumers and expanded e-commerce, while its SportStyle business benefited from renewed fashion interest in older running-shoe designs such as the GEL-KAYANO 14.

Growth continued in fiscal 2025. Consolidated net sales increased 19.5% to ¥810.9 billion, operating profit rose 42.4% to ¥142.5 billion, and profit attributable to owners of the parent rose 54.7% to ¥98.7 billion. Performance Running remained the largest category, with sales of ¥363.5 billion, while SportStyle reached ¥141.3 billion and Onitsuka Tiger ¥136.5 billion. SportStyle and Onitsuka Tiger each exceeded ¥100 billion in annual sales for the first time. In Japan, sales to inbound tourists rose by about 84% to ¥47.4 billion; ¥41.5 billion of that total came from Onitsuka Tiger.

Onitsuka Tiger became an increasingly important growth business during the 2020s. Its popularity was aided by renewed demand for retro, low-profile sneakers and by spending from tourists visiting Japan; by 2026 the brand operated almost 200 stores worldwide and was pursuing a selective distribution strategy centered on directly operated flagship stores and selected retailers. The brand withdrew from the United States in 2023 amid differences over brand strategy between its management and Asics America, and subsequently announced plans to return with a Los Angeles flagship store in 2027.

In June 2026, Asics announced a planned reorganization of its Onitsuka Tiger business under the newly established, wholly owned OT GROUP Corporation. Under the plan, the Onitsuka Tiger business directly operated by ASICS Corporation is scheduled to be succeeded by OT GROUP through an absorption-type company split effective January 1, 2027; the company also adopted a policy to reorganize Onitsuka Tiger operations held by regional subsidiaries under OT GROUP. Reuters reported that the reorganization was intended to speed decision-making at a brand that had become a major profit driver for Asics; Onitsuka Tiger's sales had risen 43% in 2025 to ¥136.5 billion.

In August 2026, Asics decided to dissolve and liquidate its consolidated subsidiary ASICS Trading Co., Ltd. and to transfer its businesses and operations to ASICS Corporation or ASICS Japan as part of a reorganization of the group's walking-shoe business.

== Products and technology ==
Research in biomechanics, materials and sports science has played an important role in Asics' product development. The ASICS Institute of Sport Science was established in 1985 by combining the company's technology-research and shoe-development functions. Its research center in Kobe was completed in 1990.

In 1986, Asics introduced running shoes incorporating its silicone-based GEL cushioning material, initially in the GT-II and FREAKS α models. GEL subsequently became one of the technologies most closely associated with the company's running shoes.

The first GEL-KAYANO Trainer was released in 1993. The model was designed by Asics employee Toshikazu Kayano, whose surname became the name of the series. The series developed into one of the company's long-running performance-running lines, while older versions later became influential in its SportStyle business.

In 2016, Asics introduced FlyteFoam, a lightweight midsole foam used in the DynaFlyte running shoe. The company continued to develop lighter and more responsive foam materials for both training and racing footwear.

In 2021, Asics introduced the METASPEED SKY and METASPEED EDGE carbon-plated racing shoes. The two models were designed around different running styles identified in research by the Institute of Sport Science: the SKY for runners who primarily increase speed by lengthening their stride, and the EDGE for runners who rely more heavily on increasing cadence.

In 2024, Asics introduced the NIMBUS MIRAI, a performance-running shoe designed with end-of-life recycling in mind. The shoe was launched with a return program intended to recover materials after use for subsequent recycling.

The Institute of Sport Science also conducts research for apparel and team-sport products. For example, heat-mapping research carried out at the institute in Kobe was used in placing Asics' ACTIBREEZE ventilation technology in uniforms designed for the Australian national cricket teams.

Beyond footwear, Asics has developed performance apparel and competitive swimwear. The ASICS brand is included in World Aquatics' database of swimwear approved for competition.

== Relationship with Nike ==
Nike, Inc. originated as Blue Ribbon Sports (BRS), founded by Phil Knight and Bill Bowerman to distribute Onitsuka Tiger shoes in the United States. Knight visited Japan in 1963 after graduating from Stanford University and approached Onitsuka about becoming its U.S. distributor. Bowerman subsequently worked on running-shoe designs manufactured by Onitsuka for the U.S. market.

Relations between Onitsuka and BRS deteriorated in the early 1970s as BRS developed footwear under its own Nike brand, and legal disputes followed between the companies. After the relationship ended, Nike marketed its version of the training shoe as the Cortez, while Onitsuka sold its related model as the Corsair.

== Sponsorships ==
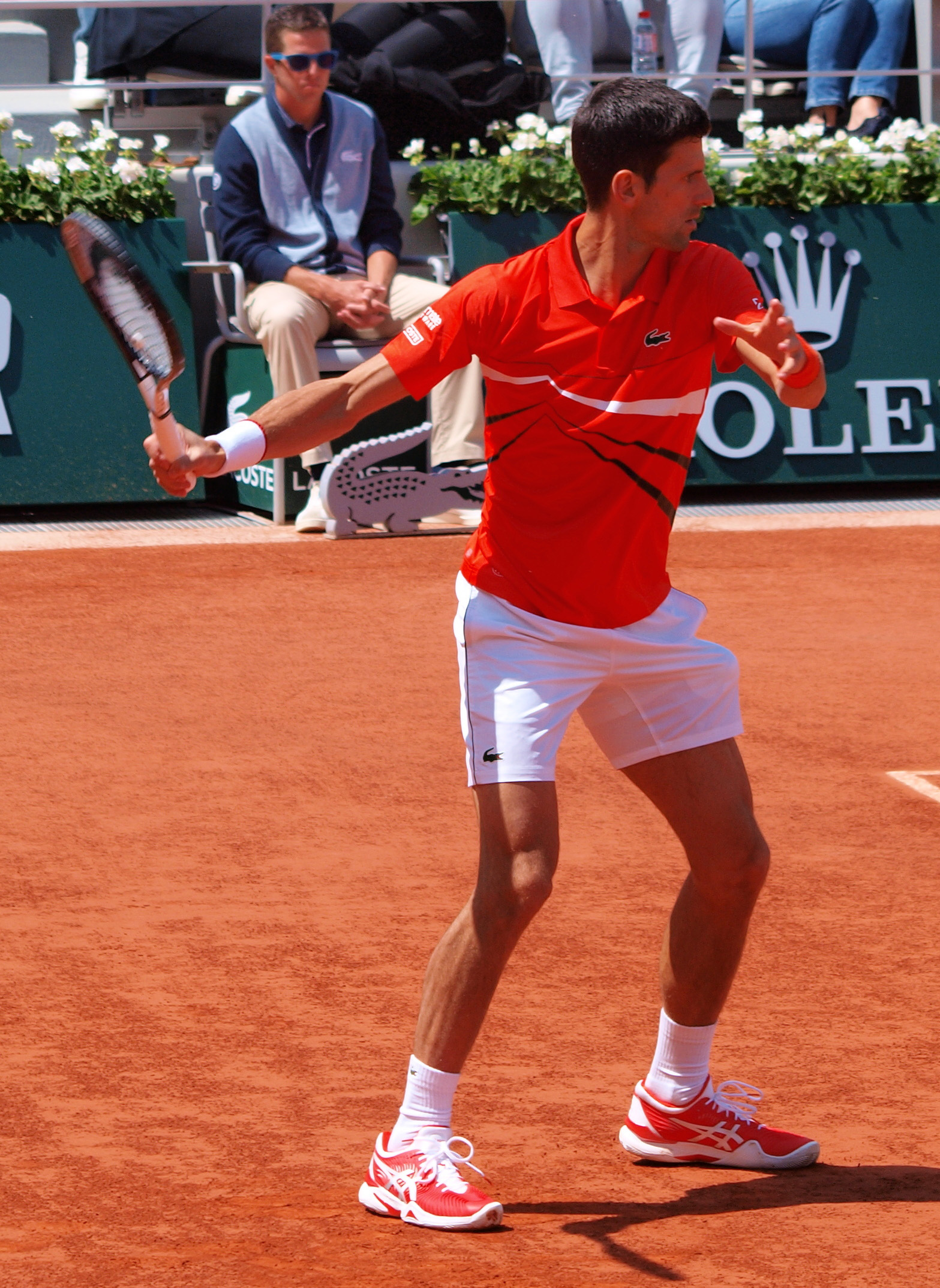
Tennis player Novak Djokovic has endorsed Asics footwear since the start of the 2018 season.

Asics sponsors sports associations, events, national teams and individual athletes. Its institutional partnerships include World Athletics, the Los Angeles Marathon and the Brazilian Paralympic Committee. World Athletics, then known as the IAAF, extended its partnership with Asics through 2029 in 2019. Asics' partnership with the Los Angeles Marathon was announced in 2019. In 2025, the Brazilian Paralympic Committee extended its partnership with Asics through the Los Angeles 2028 Paralympic Games.

Individual athletes associated with Asics include volleyball player Ran Takahashi, basketball player Yuki Kawamura, and tennis players Novak Djokovic, Lorenzo Musetti, Beatriz Haddad Maia and Jasmine Paolini.

Asics announced on October 4, 2011, that it would become the official kit manufacturer for the Australia national cricket team, replacing German manufacturer Adidas. In 2023, Cricket Australia renewed the partnership for another five years, through 2028. Asics continued to supply playing uniforms to Australia's men's and women's national teams for the 2025–26 and 2026–27 seasons.

Asics has also supplied official sportswear, footwear and bags to Japanese national delegations through its relationship with the Japanese Olympic Committee and Japanese Paralympic Committee, including for the Paris 2024 Olympic and Paralympic Games.

== Supply chain and labor practices ==
In March 2017, employees assembling Asics products in Cambodia fainted due to thick smoke present in a factory where they were working. The company responded by saying that it and the factory would introduce measures focusing on worker awareness, health and safety training, and improved ventilation.

In March 2021, amid international controversy over allegations of forced Uyghur labor and cotton production in Xinjiang, a post on an Asics Chinese social-media account stated that the company would continue to source cotton from the region. Asics' head office subsequently stated that the post was unauthorized and did not represent the company's official position. The company also stated that cotton used in uniforms supplied to the Australian Olympic team was not sourced from Xinjiang.

== Gallery ==
An earlier Asics wordmark

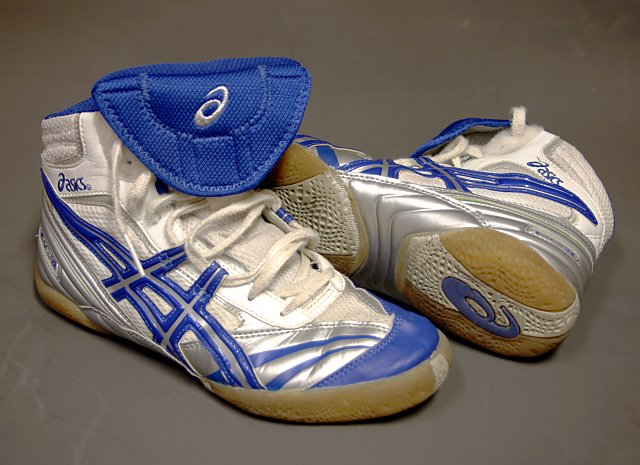
A pair of Asics wrestling shoes, model Split Second V

A pair of Asics running shoes, model GEL-Kinsei

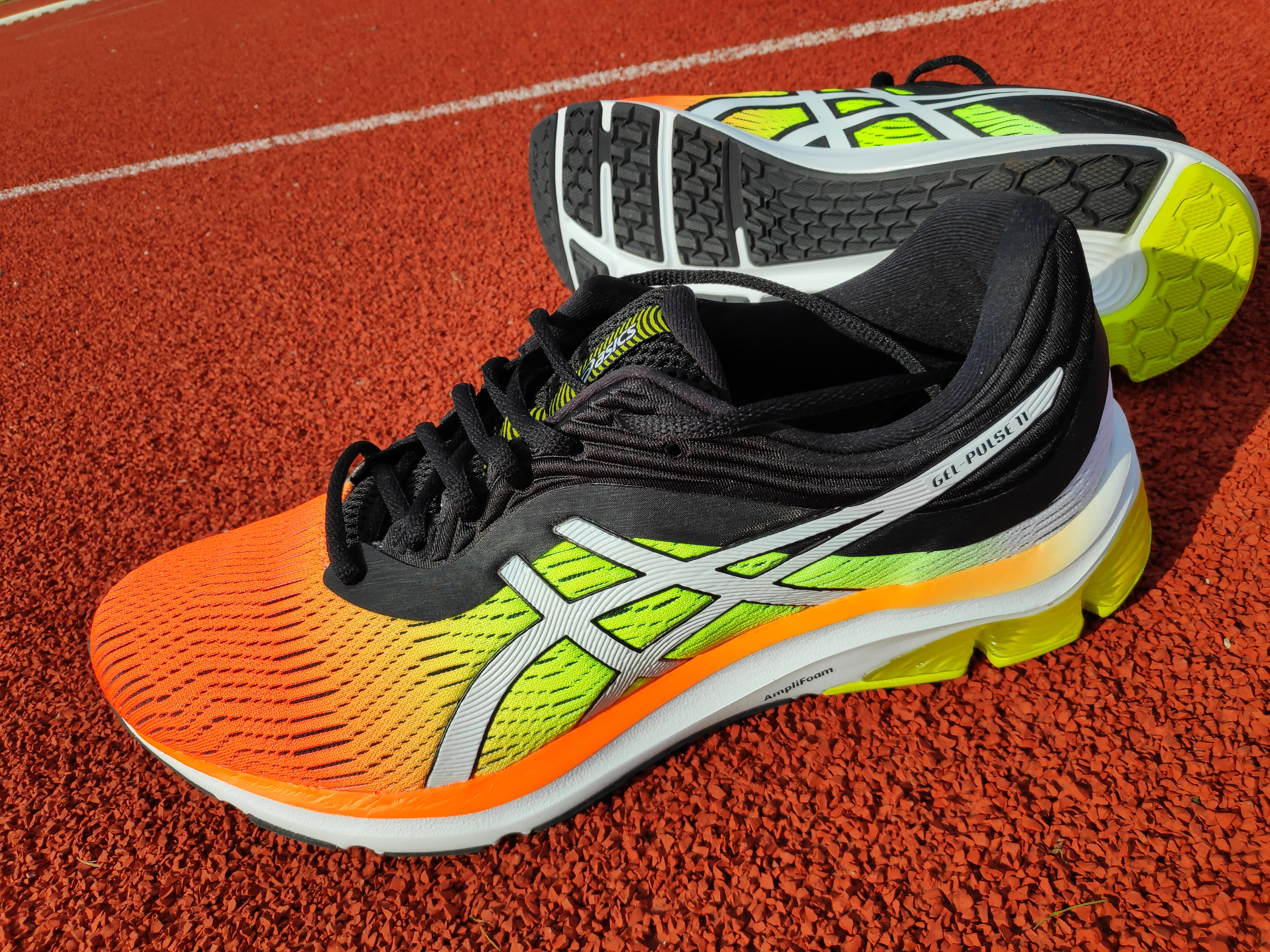
Asics GEL-Pulse 11 running shoes

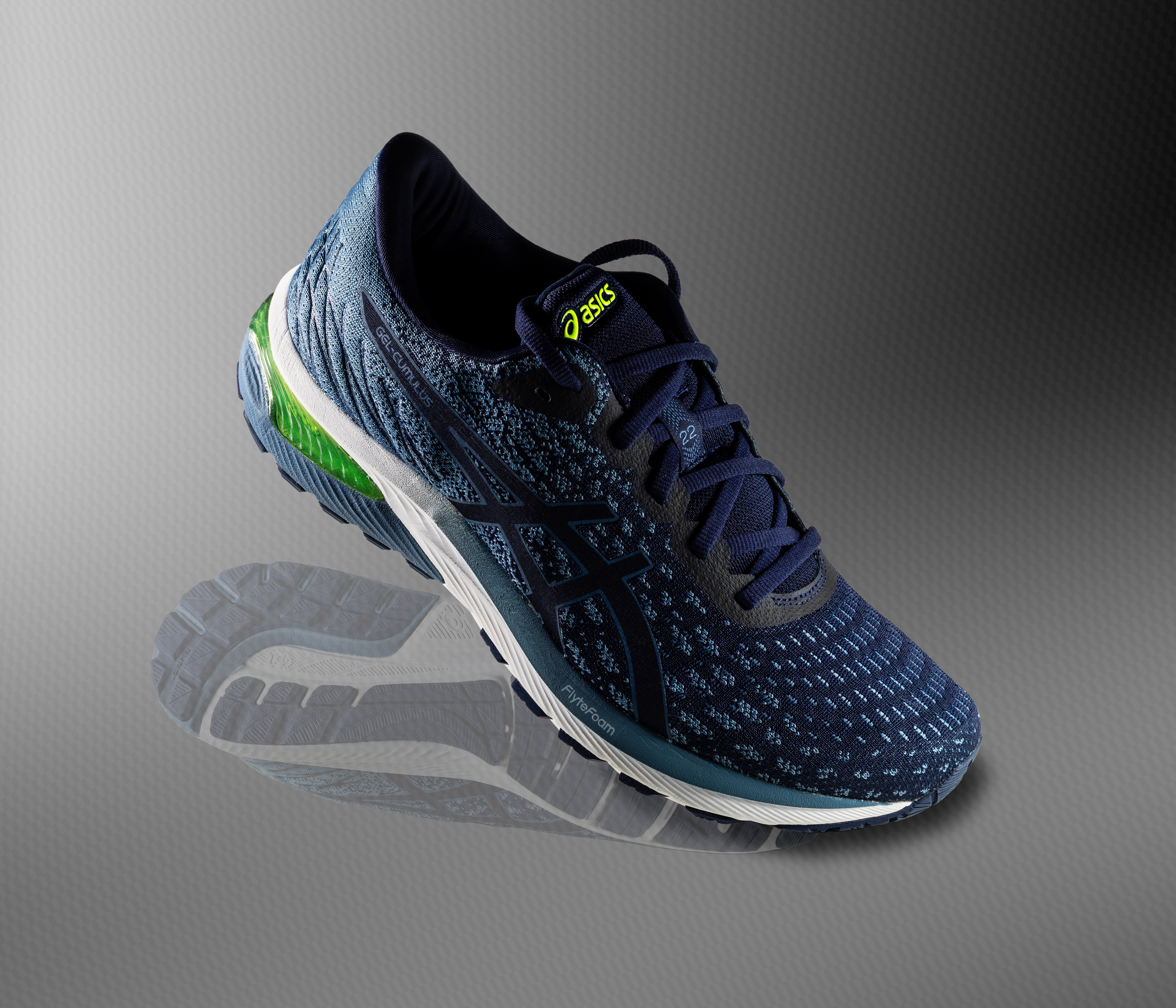
Asics GEL-Cumulus 22, men's running shoes

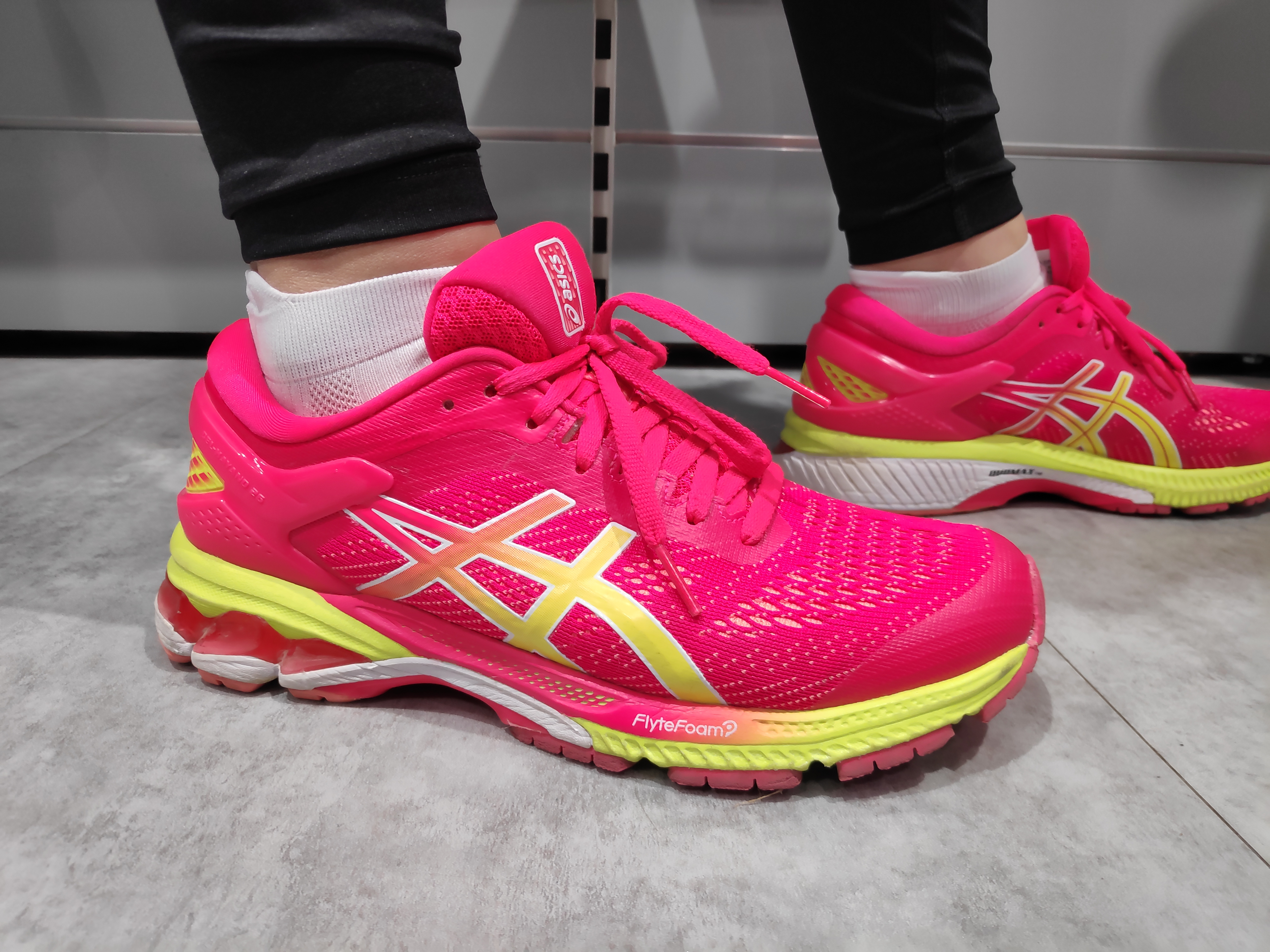
Asics GEL-Kayano 26, women's running shoes

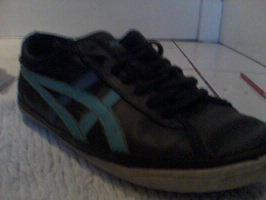
An Asics sports shoe
