= Phil Knight =

American businessman (born 1938)

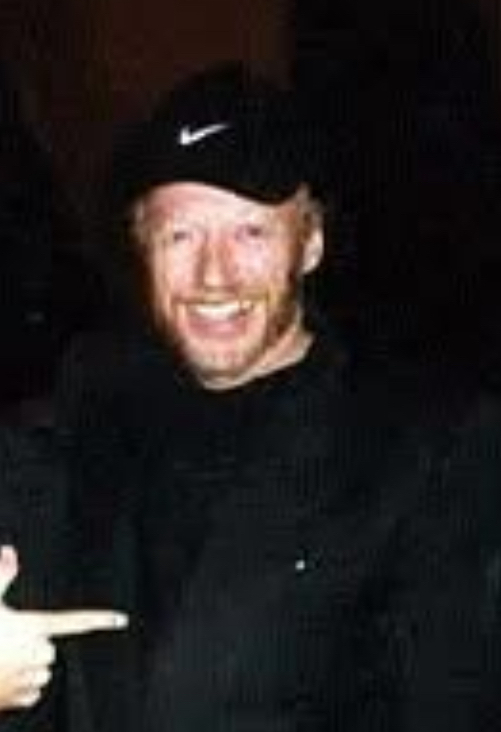
- Knight in 1999
- Born: Philip Hampson Knight; February 24, 1938 (age 88); Portland, Oregon, U.S.
- Education: University of Oregon (BBA); Stanford University (MBA)
- Spouse: Penny Parks (m. 1968)
- Children: 3, including Travis Knight
- Father: William W. Knight

Philip Hampson Knight (born February 24, 1938) is an American businessman who co-founded Nike, Inc., a global sports footwear, equipment and apparel company. He previously was its chairman and CEO. As of October 2025, Forbes estimated his net worth at US$35.4 billion. He is also the owner of the stop motion film production company Laika. Knight is a graduate of the University of Oregon and the Stanford Graduate School of Business. He was part of the track and field club under coach Bill Bowerman at the University of Oregon with whom he would later co-found Nike.

Knight has donated hundreds of millions of dollars to each of his alma maters, as well as Oregon Health & Science University.

== Early life ==
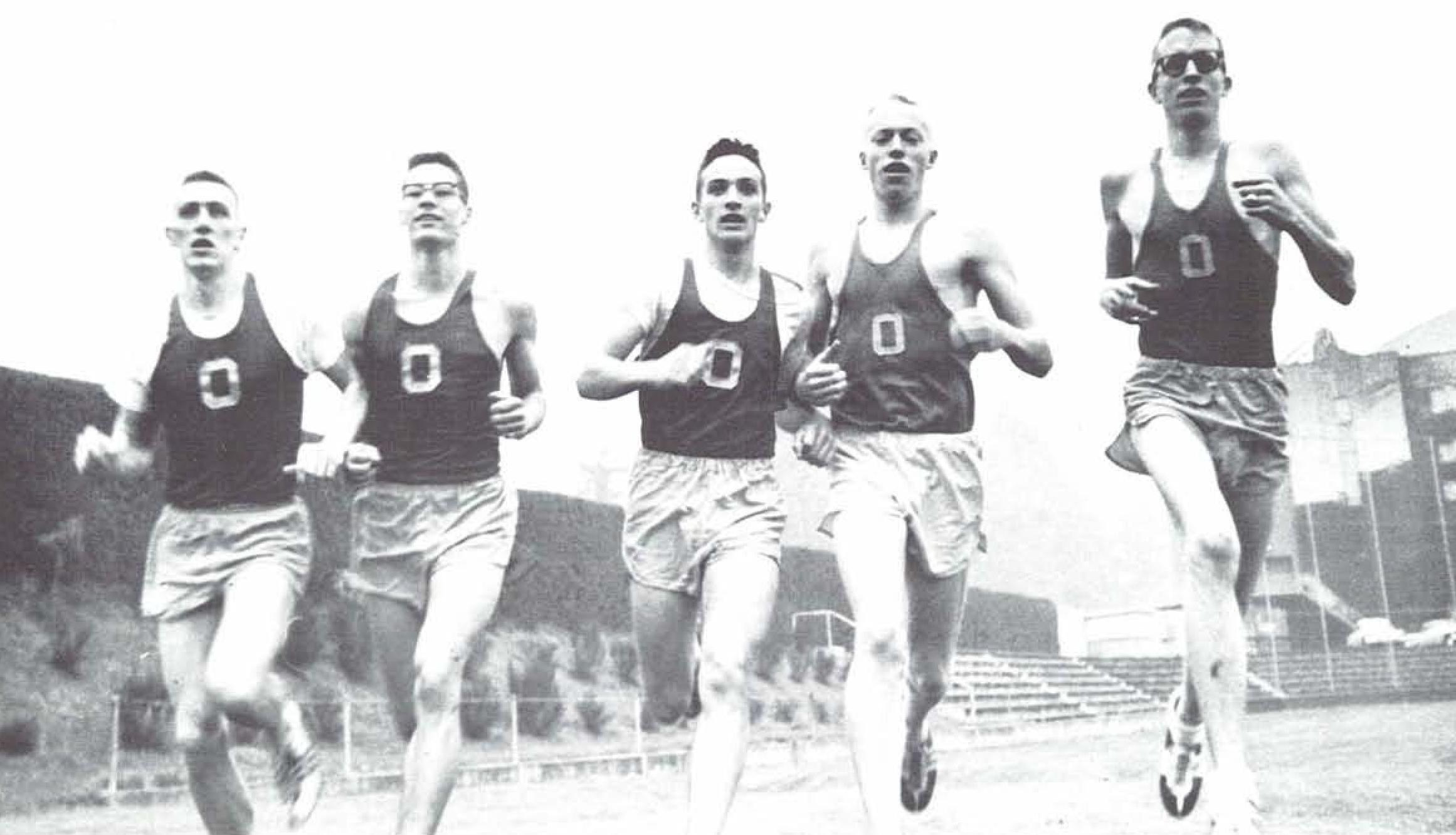
Knight (second from right) running track in 1958

Phil Hampson Knight was born on February 24, 1938, in Portland, Oregon, to William Knight, a lawyer turned newspaper publisher, and his wife, Lota Cloy (née Hatfield) Knight. He grew up in the Portland neighborhood of Eastmoreland, and attended Cleveland High School. According to one source, "When his father refused to give him a summer job at his newspaper [the now defunct Oregon Journal], believing that his son should find work on his own," Knight "went to the rival Oregonian, where he worked the morning shift tabulating sports scores and every morning ran home the full 7 miles (11 km)."

Knight continued his education at the University of Oregon in Eugene, where he ran for the famed Oregon track and field program, was a sports reporter for the Oregon Daily Emerald and was a member of Phi Gamma Delta fraternity. Knight earned a business degree (B.B.A.) in 1959 in just three years. That same year, Knight also received his Army Reserve Commission and was a "Distinguished Military Graduate".

As a middle-distance runner at Oregon, his personal best was 1 mile (1.6 km) in 4 minutes, 13 seconds, and he won varsity letters for his track performances in 1957, 1958, and 1959. In 1977, together with Bowerman and Geoff Hollister, Knight founded an American running team called Athletics West.

== Business career ==
=== Early career ===
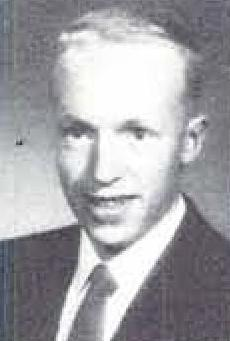
Knight in the 1957 Oregana

Before Blue Ribbon Sports—later Nike—flourished, Knight worked as a Certified Public Accountant, first with Coopers & Lybrand, and then Price Waterhouse.

=== Nike Inc. ===
Immediately after graduating from the University of Oregon, Knight was commissioned a second lieutenant in the Army and served one year on active duty and seven years in the Army Reserve. He next enrolled at Stanford Graduate School of Business, where, for his small business class, Knight produced a paper, "Can Japanese Sports Shoes Do to German Sports Shoes What Japanese Cameras Did to German Cameras?", that essentially foretold his eventual foray into selling running shoes. His ambition was to import high-quality and low-cost running shoes from Japan into the American market. He graduated with a master's degree in business administration from Stanford in 1962.

Knight set out on a trip around the world after graduation, during which he made a stop in Kobe, Japan, in November 1962. It was there that he discovered Tiger brand running shoes, manufactured in Kobe by the Onitsuka Co., now known as Asics. Impressed by the quality and low cost of the shoes, Knight called Mr. Onitsuka, who agreed to meet with him. By the end of the meeting, Knight had secured Tiger distribution rights for the western United States.

The first Tiger samples would take more than a year to be shipped to Knight; during that time he found a job as an accountant in Portland. When Knight finally received the shoe samples, he mailed two pairs to Bowerman at the University of Oregon, hoping to gain both a sale and an influential endorsement. To Knight's surprise, Bowerman not only ordered the Tiger shoes, but also offered to become a partner with Knight and provide product design ideas. The two men agreed to a partnership by handshake on January 25, 1964, the birth date of Blue Ribbon Sports, the company that would later become Nike.

Knight's first sales were made out of a now storied green Plymouth Valiant automobile at track meets across the Pacific Northwest. By 1969, these early sales allowed Knight to leave his accountant job and work full-time for Blue Ribbon Sports.

Jeff Johnson, Nike's first full time employee, suggested calling the firm "Nike," named after the Greek winged goddess of victory, and Blue Ribbon Sports was subsequently renamed Nike in 1971.

Nike's "swoosh" logo, now considered one of the most valuable logos in the world, was commissioned for $35 from graphic design student Carolyn Davidson in 1971. According to Nike's website, Knight said at the time: "I don't love it, but it will grow on me." In September 1983, Davidson was given an undisclosed amount of Nike stock for her contribution to the company's brand and a gold swoosh ring. On the Oprah television program in April 2011, Knight said he gave Davidson "a few hundred shares" when the company went public.

At Nike, Knight developed personal relationships with some of the world's most recognizable athletes, including Michael Jordan and Tiger Woods.

=== Vinton Studios becomes Laika ===
Following mainstream success in the late 1990s, Will Vinton Studios animation company sought external investors due to rapid growth. Knight assumed a 15 percent stake in the company in 1998, and his son Travis—who had graduated from Portland State following an unsuccessful attempt at a rap music career—went to work at the studio as an animator.

Citing mismanagement, Knight eventually purchased Will Vinton Studios and assumed control of the company's board with the cooperation of Nike executives. In late 2003, Knight appointed his son to the board and, after Vinton had stepped down—prior to leaving the company with a severance package. Knight later rebranded the company as Laika. He then invested $180 million into Laika, and the studio released its first feature film, Coraline, in stop motion, in 2009. Coraline was a financial success and Travis Knight was then promoted into the roles of Laika CEO and president.

=== Death of Matthew Knight ===
In May 2004, two years after Knight bought Vinton, his son Matthew, aged 34 years, traveled to El Salvador to film a fund-raising video for Christian Children of the World, a Portland nonprofit organization. However, while scuba diving with his colleagues Vincenzo Iannuzzelli and Robert McDonell in Lake Ilopango, near San Salvador, he died from a heart attack 150 feet (50 m) underwater due to an undetected congenital heart defect. Knight and Travis traveled to El Salvador to return Matthew's body to the US. Laika Studio's 2005 short film Moongirl was dedicated to Matthew's memory.

Knight resigned as Nike CEO on November 18, 2004, several months after Matthew's funeral but retained the position of chairman of the board. Knight's replacement was William Perez, former CEO of S.C. Johnson & Son, Inc., who was eventually replaced by Mark Parker in 2006.

In 2011, the Matthew Knight Arena at the University of Oregon was named in his honor.

=== Post-Nike CEO role ===
During the 2009–2010 period, Knight was the largest single contributor to the campaign to defeat Oregon Ballot Measures 66 and 67, which, once passed, increased income tax on some corporations and high-income individuals.

In June 2015, Knight and Nike announced that he would step down as the company's chairman, with president and CEO Mark Parker to succeed him. Knight's retirement from the Nike board took effect at the end of June 2016. In September 2017, Knight decided to come out of retirement to put black back in the UNC jerseys for the Phil Knight Classic in Portland, Oregon.

=== Memoir ===
Knight's memoir, Shoe Dog, was released on April 26, 2016, by Simon & Schuster, was rated fifth on The New York Times Best Seller list for business books in July 2018, and details the building of the Nike brand, from importing Japanese shoes to being part of a federal investigation.

== Philanthropy ==
As of July 2021, Knight has a net worth of $60.8 billion. In 1990, Knight founded the Philip H. Knight Charitable Foundation Trust. As of 2016, according to Portland Business Journal, "Knight is the most generous philanthropist in Oregon history. His lifetime gifts now approach $2 billion." According to The Chronicle of Philanthropy, in 2023, Knight was America's second largest donor with $1.2 billion in giving.

=== Stanford University ===
In 2006, Knight donated US$105 million to the Stanford Graduate School of Business, which, at the time, was the largest ever individual donation to a U.S. business school. The campus was named "The Knight Management Center," in honor of Knight's philanthropic service to the school.

In 2016, it was announced that Knight contributed $400 million to start the Knight-Hennessy Scholars graduate-level education program inspired by the Rhodes Scholarship. Graduates are charged to tackle global challenges, such as climate change and poverty. The first class of 51 scholars from 21 countries was scheduled to arrive at Stanford in the fall of 2018.

In May 2022, it was announced that Phil and Penny Knight gifted Stanford $75 million to establish the Phil and Penny Knight Initiative for Brain Resilience. The initiative will be housed at Stanford's Wu Tsai Neurosciences Institute and is set to study the cognitive decline and degenerative brain diseases such as Parkinson's and Alzheimer's.

=== University of Oregon ===
As of 2026, Knight has donated over two billion dollars to the University of Oregon. It is believed that Knight made his first major contribution in the late 1980s. By 2000 Knight had already contributed over $50 million to UO. He was UO's 2018–19 honorary degree recipient.

==== UO Academics ====
Major gifts include funds supporting the renovation of the Knight Library and construction of the Knight Law Center. Contrary to press reports, which claim that Knight financed the whole library renovation project, Knight only financed a portion of the library's renovation. Knight also established endowed chairs across the campus. In the fall of 2016, it was announced that Knight will donate $500 million to UO for a new three-building laboratory and research science complex. This donation was part of a series of large higher-education gifts.

In September 2026, Knight and his wife Penny donated $1 billion to the University of Oregon. The donation, the largest known to a public university, is intended to establish a new engineering school.

==== UO Athletic Department (Oregon Ducks) ====
Knight contributed towards the Moshofsky Center, which opened in 1998.

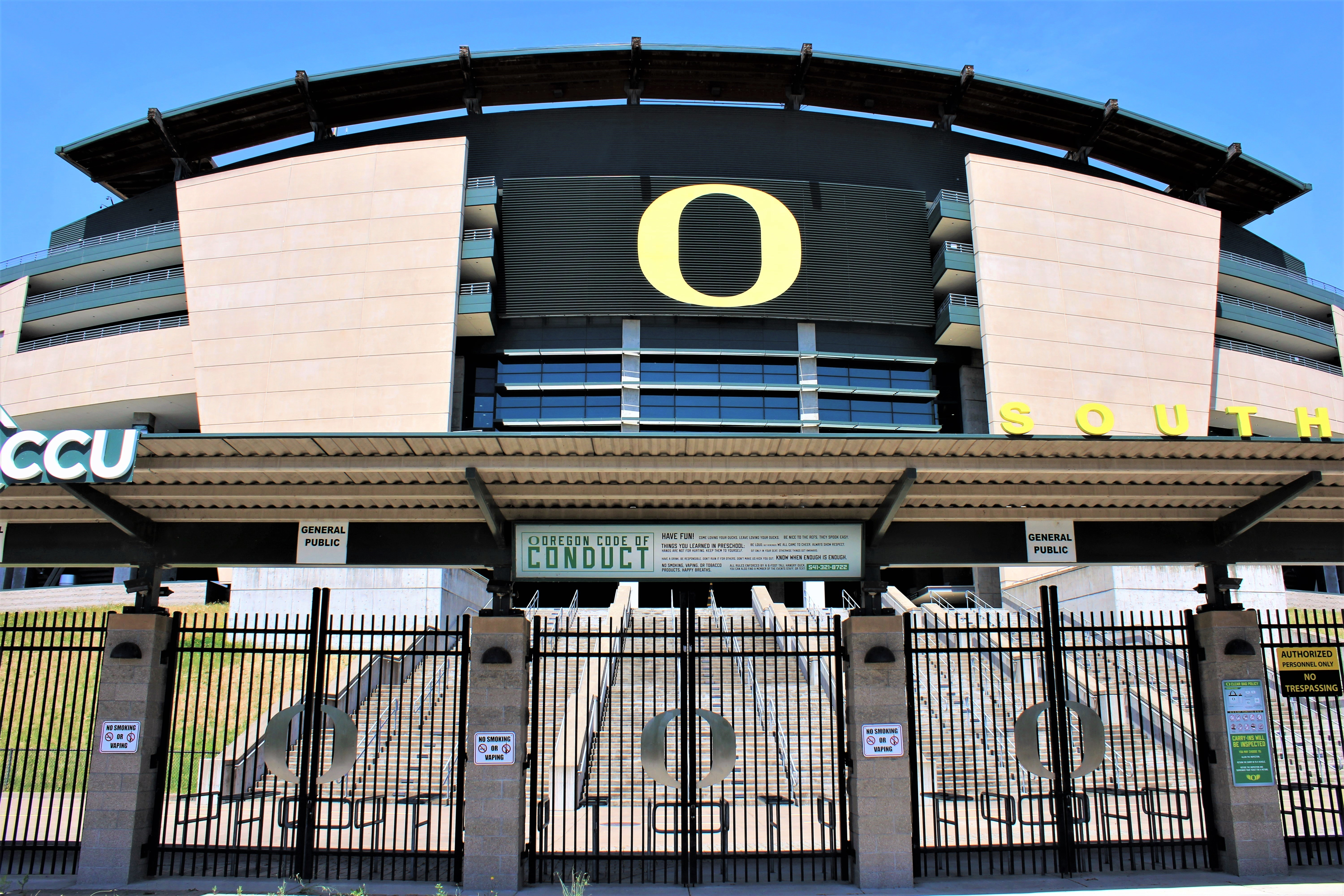
Exterior of Autzen Stadium, University of Oregon

In August 2007, Knight announced that he and his wife would be donating US$100 million to found the UO Athletics Legacy Fund to help support all athletic programs at the university. In response, athletic director Pat Kilkenny said: "This extraordinary gift will set Oregon athletics on a course toward certain self sufficiency and create the flexibility and financial capacity for the university to move forward with the new athletic arena." At the time, the donation was the largest philanthropic gift in the history of the university.

The 2010 construction of the UO basketball team's Matthew Knight Arena was the result of a partnership between Knight and former Oregon athletic director Pat Kilkenny. Although Knight didn't pay for the project directly, he established a $100 million "Athletic Legacy Fund." The fund supports the athletic department. Named after Knight's deceased son, the venue replaced the McArthur Court building and cost over US$200 million to build. The facility was built using bonds backed by the State of Oregon.

Knight was responsible for financing the UO's US$68 million 145,000 square-foot gridiron football facility that was officially opened in late July 2013. Knight's personal locker in the team's locker room displays the title "Uncle Phil", and other features include a gym with Brazilian hardwood floors, Apple iPhone chargers in each of the players' lockers, various auditoriums and meeting rooms, a games room for the players that includes flat-screen televisions and foosball machines, and a cafeteria.

In November 2015, it was announced that Knight and his wife would be donating $19.2 million towards a new sports complex project at the University of Oregon. The plans for the 29,000 square foot complex was announced in September. Construction started in January 2016 and ended in September 2016. The sports complex was named the Marcus Mariota Sports Performance Center and includes motion capture systems, neurocognitive assessment tools, 40-yard dash track, and steam machines made by Nike to help athletes break into their footwear more quickly.

In 2021, Knight helped to fund the renovation of Hayward Field, a track and field stadium at the university. The project was estimated to cost $270 million, although Knight's total contribution remained private.

=== Oregon Health & Science University ===
In October 2008, Knight and his wife pledged US$100 million to the OHSU Cancer Institute, the largest gift in the history of Oregon Health & Science University. In recognition, the university renamed the organization the "OHSU Knight Cancer Institute."

On September 27, 2013, Knight announced to the audience at the OHSU Knight Cancer Institute's biennial gala, when he announced his intention to donate US$500 million for research if OHSU could match it over the subsequent two years. On June 25, 2015, OHSU met that $500 million goal, and Knight announced his upcoming $500 million donation, to bring the total to $1 billion raised.

In 2025, Knight and his wife pledged $2 billion to the Oregon Health & Science University Knight Cancer Institute, bringing the total the Knights have donated to Oregon Health & Science to $2.7 billion.

==== Controversy ====
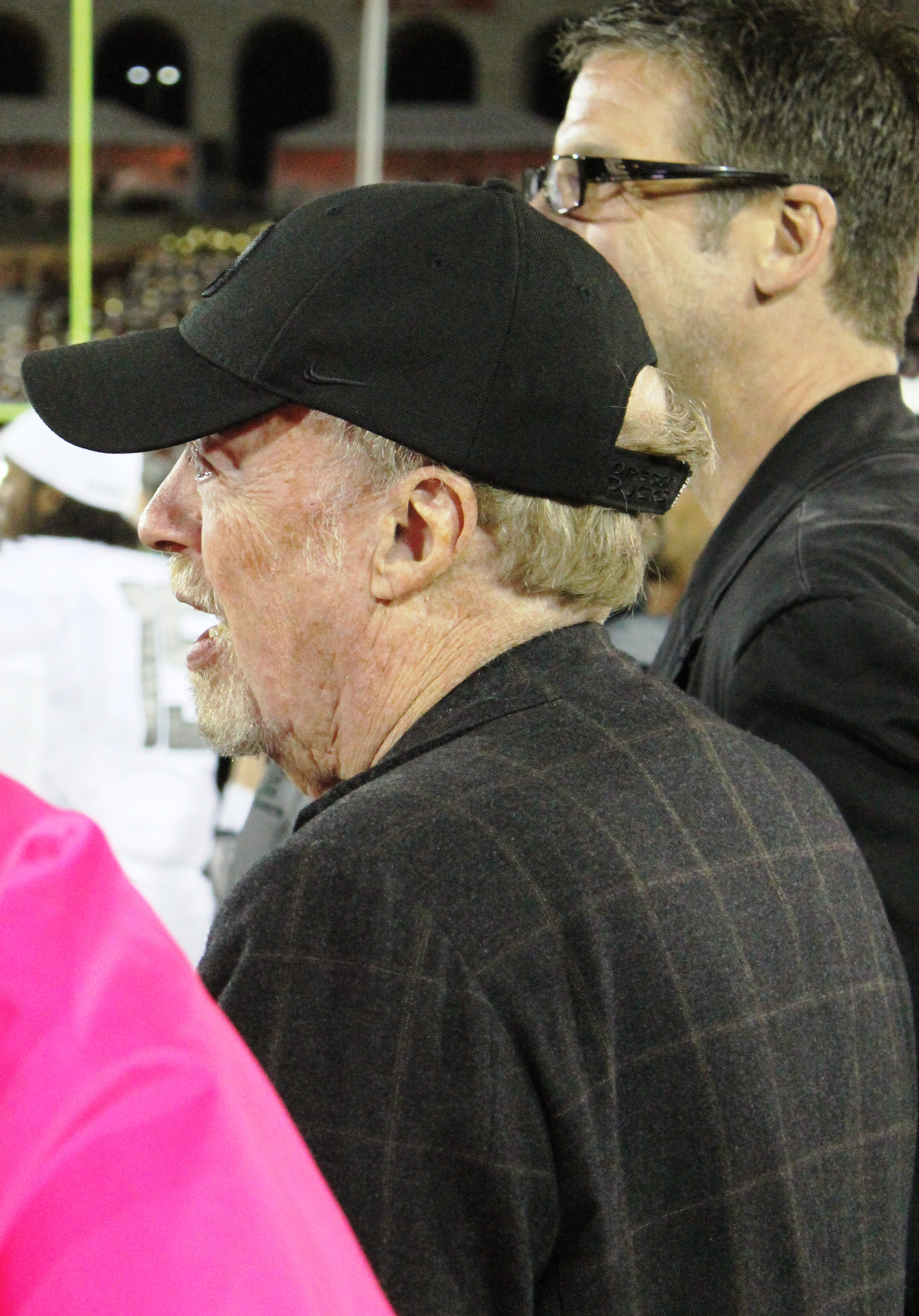
Knight at an Oregon Ducks football game in 2010

Knight's contributions to the athletic department at UO have also led to controversy. In April 2000, student leaders began organizing an anti-sweatshop and fair labor practices campaign, and called for Dave Frohnmayer, president of the school, to support the Workers Rights Consortium (WRC). On April 4, 2000, students began a sit-in at Johnson Hall, the UO's administrative center. In early April, an open meeting of students further demanded that the organization Fair Labor Association (FLA) would receive no consideration from the university, as it has many of the corporations it oversees are members of the group's board, including Nike, which was also one FLA's founding members. FLA has also been criticized by worker rights advocates as an exercise in dishonest public relations.

Frohnmayer subsequently signed a one-year contract with the WRC; Knight then withdrew a US$30 million commitment toward the Autzen Stadium expansion project and offered no further donations to the university. In a public statement, Knight criticized the WRC for having unrealistic provisions and called it misguided, while praising the FLA for being "balanced" in its approach. In the face of ongoing conflict with students, Frohnmayer sided with Knight's assertion that the WRC was providing unbalanced representation, and in October 2000 the Eugene Weekly reported Frohnmayer stating that:

... he would refuse to pay dues to the WRC based on a legal opinion from UO General Counsel Melinda Grier arguing that to do so would be illegal and open the university to liability. Grier claimed the WRC had not yet incorporated, had not yet filed as a non-profit, and served no public purpose justifying a dues payment.

On February 16, 2001, the Oregon University System enacted a mandate that all institutions within the system choose business partners from a politically neutral standpoint, barring all universities in Oregon from joining either the WRC or the FLA. Following the dissolved relationship between the university and the WRC, Knight reinstated the donation and increased the amount to over US$50 million.

Also controversial was Knight's success in lobbying for former insurance executive Pat Kilkenny to be named as athletic director at the university. Kilkenny had neither a college degree nor any prior experience in athletics administration. He attended UO, but did not graduate, as he left the school with several credit hours still owing. Prior to his appointment at UO, Kilkenny had been the chairman and chief executive officer of the San Diego–based Arrowhead General Insurance Agency, and grew the business into a nationwide organization, with written premiums of nearly US$1 billion when he sold the company in 2006.

=== Other projects ===
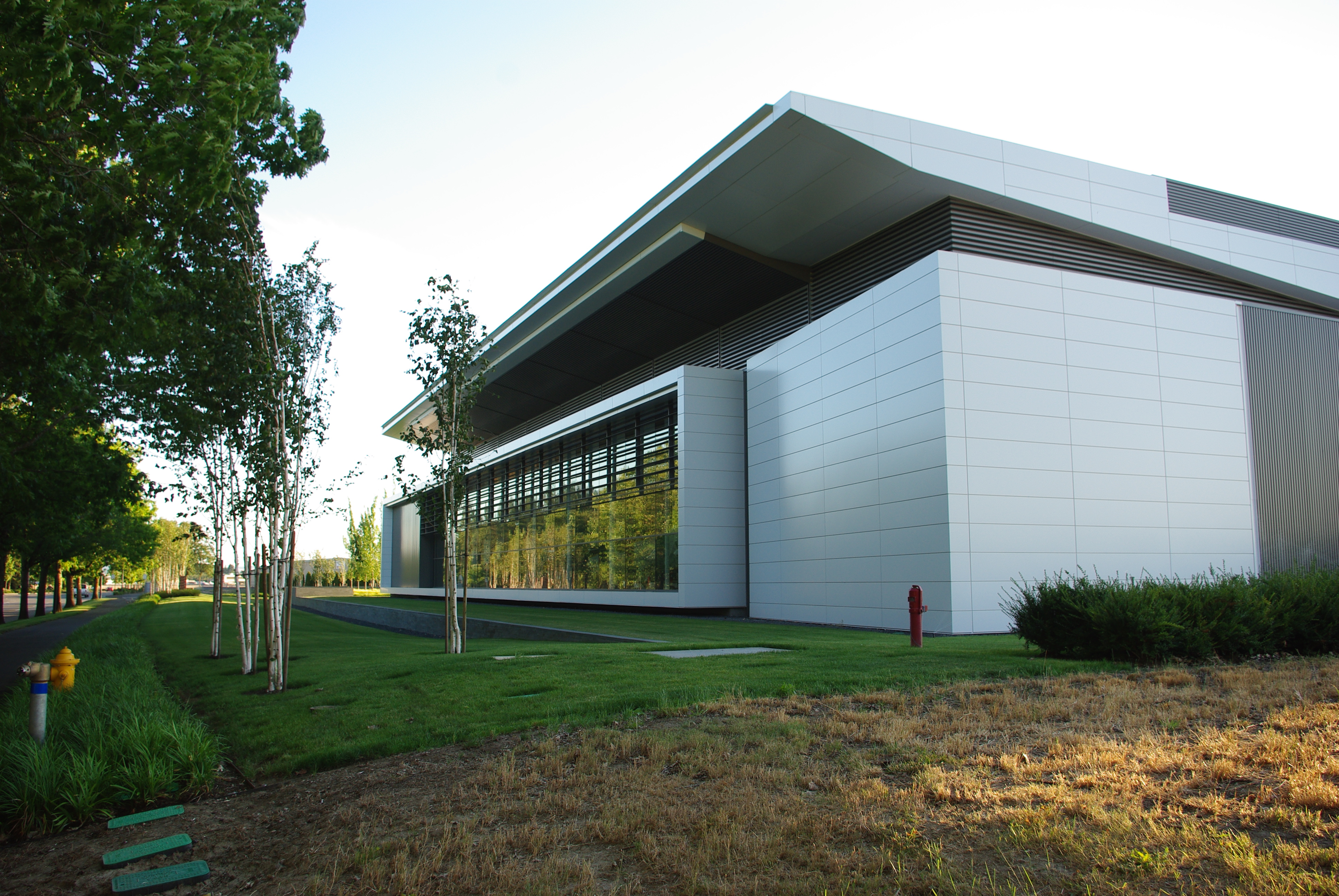
Knight's personal hangar at Hillsboro Airport

In October 2010, Knight donated several million dollars to the Catlin Gabel School to establish a scholarship for incoming freshmen students.

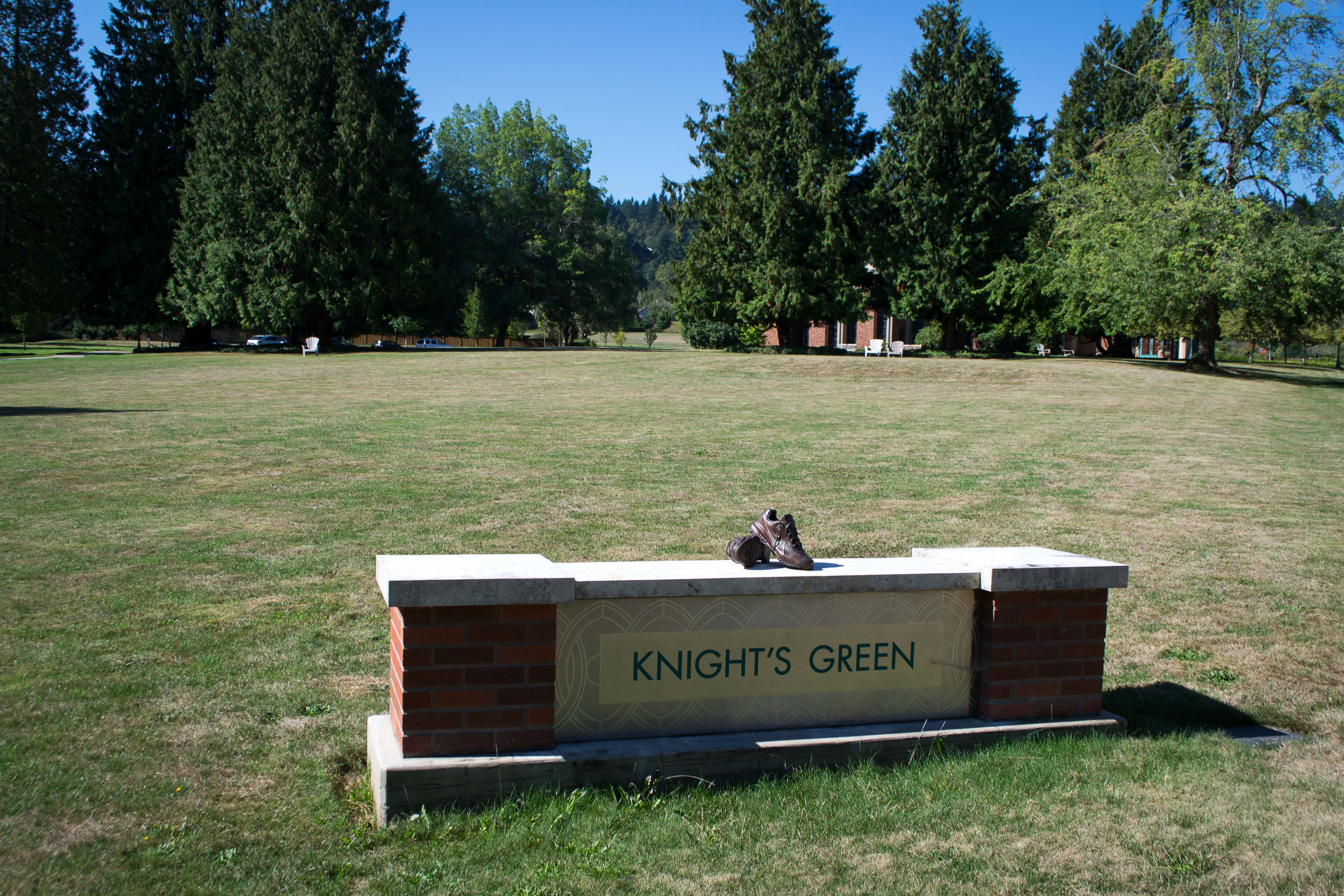
Knight's Green, a lawn named after Knight at Marylhurst University in Marylhurst, Oregon

On May 18, 2012, Knight contributed US$65,000 to a Political Action Committee (PAC), called Oregonians for Higher Education Excellence, formed by Columbia Sportswear CEO Tim Boyle and John von Schlegell, managing partner at Endeavour Capital. According to Boyle, the focus of the PAC is to help facilitate an increase in the autonomy of schools in the Oregon University System.

Knight and wife Penny also donated to the Marylhurst Knights Opportunity Scholarship Program at Marylhurst University, a private Catholic university in Marylhurst, Oregon; as a result, the university named a lawn on their campus "Knight's Green" in the family's honor.

In December 2016, Knight disclosed that he had donated $112 million in Nike stock to charity.

In 2026, Knight built his own $7,600,000 private hangar in Oregon to house his multiple private Gulfstream jets.

== Accolades ==
In 2000, Knight was inducted into the Oregon Sports Hall of Fame for his Special Contribution to Sports in Oregon. At the time of his induction, he had contributed approximately US$230 million to UO, the majority of which was for athletics.

On February 24, 2012, Knight was announced as a 2012 inductee of the Naismith Memorial Basketball Hall of Fame, as a contributor. The Hall recognized him as the driving force behind Nike's financial support of U.S. basketball and its players. Knight was formally inducted on September 7, 2012.

In 1989, Knight received the Golden Plate Award of the American Academy of Achievement. For his "contributions to business, corporate and philanthropic leadership", Knight was elected to the 2015 American Academy of Arts and Sciences membership class.

In 2020, the university polled alumni and fans on social media, asking them which four UO alumni they would place on a notional Mount Rushmore for the university. Knight was one of the four final choices, along with Ducks track runner Steve Prefontaine; NFL player Marcus Mariota, the 2014 Heisman Trophy winner; and Sabrina Ionescu, who had just completed her college basketball career for the Ducks.

In 2024, Knight received the President's award of the World Athletics Awards.

In 2025 The Chronicle of Philanthropy named Knight as the top charitable donor of the year, after he made a record $2 billion donation Oregon Health & Science University that August.

== Personal life ==
Knight met his wife, Penelope "Penny" Parks, while he was her professor at Portland State University. They were married on September 13, 1968. They own a home in La Quinta, California.

Knight's son, Matthew, died in a scuba diving accident in El Salvador in 2004. Another son of Knight's, Travis Knight, is a filmmaker and president and CEO of Laika, the stop-motion animation studio, where Phil Knight is chairman.

Knight lists Nike's headquarters in Beaverton, Oregon, as his home address on government records. He resides in a rural area outside Hillsboro, Oregon and owns a personal flight hangar along with two private jets at the Hillsboro Airport.

In 2023, Ben Affleck and Matt Damon produced the film Air about Nike's signing of Michael Jordan and ultimately the creation of the Air Jordan brand. Affleck plays Knight in the film.

== Politics ==
Knight is a registered Republican and a frequent contributor to Republican political candidates in Oregon. In 2010, he donated $400,000 to Chris Dudley, the then Republican nominee for Governor of Oregon.

Knight occasionally supports Democrats, however; in 1986 he financed Neil Goldschmidt's successful campaign, and in 2014, he donated $250,000 to the re-election campaign of Democrat John Kitzhaber.

He donated $3.5 million to Republican Knute Buehler during the 2018 Oregon gubernatorial election. Regarding this donation, Knight criticized the unfunded Oregon Public Employees Retirement System and the general fiscal state of Oregon, implying Democratic governor Kate Brown was at fault.

Knight was once again a major donor during the 2022 Oregon gubernatorial election. He gave $3.75 million to independent candidate Betsy Johnson until September 2022. After Johnson's support declined in the polls, he switched to backing Republican Christine Drazan, writing her a $1 million check on October 6 of that year. He made a second donation to the Drazan campaign later in October. Also in 2022, Knight donated $2 million to a political action committee seeking to elect Republican state legislators in Oregon.

While Knight is generally reluctant to give interviews, he spoke with the New York Times in October 2022 regarding his support for Republican candidates. He argued Oregon's government had drifted too far to the left and described himself as "more conservative than Nike," responding to criticism of him backing an anti-abortion candidate which apparently contrasted with the company's image of supporting progressive social justice causes. Nike itself donated $75,000 to Drazan and Johnson's Democratic opponent, Tina Kotek, the eventual winner of the election.

In April 2023, Knight contributed $2 million more to the same conservative PAC called "Bring Balance to Salem". In October 2025, Knight contributed an additional $3 million to the same PAC. The $3 million donation broke Knight's own record for political donations.

In March 2026, Knight donated $1 million to Chris Dudley's gubernatorial bid, the largest donation made to a 2026 gubernatorial candidate so far.

== See also ==
- Philip H. Knight Chairs and Professorships
