= Runkeeper =

GPS fitness-tracking app

- Original author: FitnessKeeper
- Developer: Asics
- Release: 2008; 18 years ago
Stable release
- Android: 12.3 / December 16, 2021; 4 years ago
- Wear OS: 2.2.5
- iOS: 12.3.1 / December 16, 2021; 4 years ago
- Operating system: Android 7+, iOS 13.7+
- Size: 57.65 MB (Android), 126.8 MB (iOS)
- Available in: 12 languages
- List of languages English, Dutch, French, German, Italian, Japanese, Korean, Portuguese, Russian, Simplified Chinese, Spanish and Swedish
- Type: Fitness
- License: Proprietary
- Website: runkeeper.com

Runkeeper is a GPS fitness-tracking app for iOS and Android launched in 2008. In late 2011, Runkeeper secured $10 million in a Series B financing, led by Spark Capital. In February 2016, Runkeeper was acquired by Asics.

== Criticism and controversy ==
In May 2016, the Runkeeper software came to the attention of the Norwegian Consumer Council for breaching European data protection laws. It is alleged to continue tracking user's locations after the application is terminated and to share this information with advertisers in ways that exceed the bounds of the application's terms and conditions.

== See also ==
- AllTrails
- Endomondo
- Google Fit
- Health (Apple)
- Strava
