= Onitsuka Tiger =

Japanese fashion brand owned by Asics

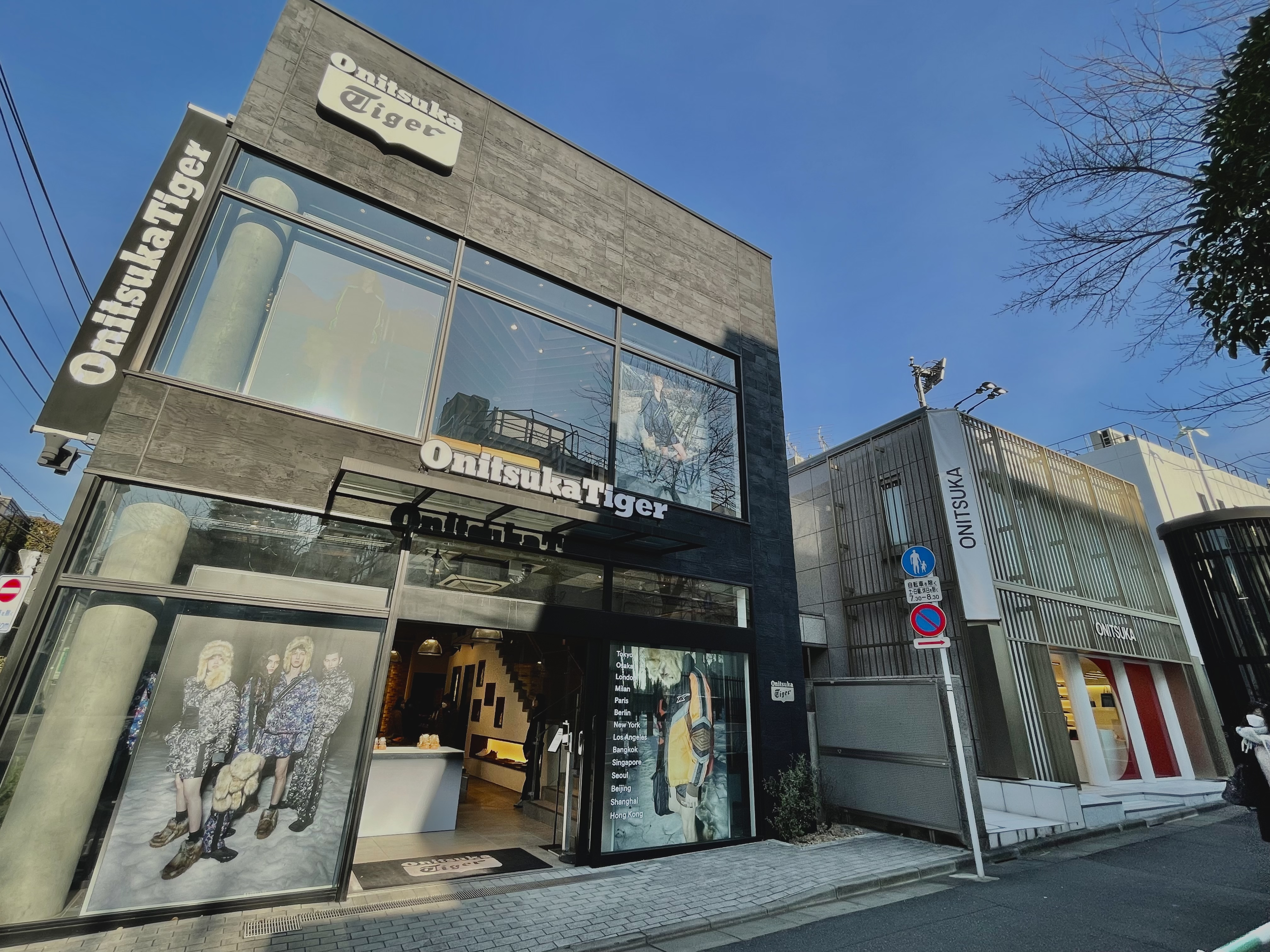
- Onitsuka Tiger store in Omotesandō, Tokyo
- Product type: Footwear, clothing, accessories and fragrance
- Current owner: Asics
- Website: onitsukatiger.com

Onitsuka Tiger (Japanese: オニツカタイガー, Hepburn: Onitsuka Taigā) is a Japanese fashion brand owned by Asics. It traces its origins to Onitsuka Co., Ltd., a sports-shoe manufacturer founded in Kobe in 1949 by Kihachiro Onitsuka. The company produced athletic footwear under the Tiger name before merging with two other Japanese sporting-goods companies to form Asics in 1977. Following a hiatus, Asics revived Onitsuka Tiger in Europe in 2002 as a fashion brand.

During the 1960s, Phil Knight began importing and distributing Onitsuka running shoes in the United States. Knight and Bill Bowerman operated through Blue Ribbon Sports, the company that preceded Nike. Onitsuka Tiger is best known for the Mexico 66, a low-profile shoe whose crossed-stripe design derives from the Mexico line introduced in 1966. The brand also produces clothing, bags, accessories and fragrance.

Onitsuka Tiger's sales grew rapidly during the 2020s, supported by demand for retro and low-profile footwear, growth in Europe and purchases by international visitors to Japan. In the financial year ended 31 December 2025, sales increased by 43 per cent to ¥136.5 billion (US$851 million), while its operating profit margin was nearly 38 per cent. In 2026, Asics announced that the business would be transferred in January 2027 to OT GROUP Corporation, a wholly owned subsidiary established as the brand's global headquarters.

== History ==
=== Origins in athletic footwear ===
Kihachiro Onitsuka established Onitsuka Shōkai in Kobe in 1949. The business was reorganised as Onitsuka Co., Ltd. later that year, and released its first basketball shoe in 1950. Onitsuka chose the name Tiger because he associated the animal with strength and agility.

According to the company's account, Onitsuka developed a basketball shoe in 1951 with a sole patterned after the suction cups of an octopus. The design was intended to improve traction during abrupt starts and stops. In 1953, the company released the Onitsuka Marathon Tabi and a relay-racing shoe bearing the Tiger mark.

In 1960, Onitsuka introduced the Magic Runner, a marathon shoe with openings intended to improve air circulation and reduce the heat associated with blistering. At the 1964 Summer Olympics in Tokyo, British silver medallist Basil Heatley and Japanese bronze medallist Kōkichi Tsuburaya wore Onitsuka marathon shoes.

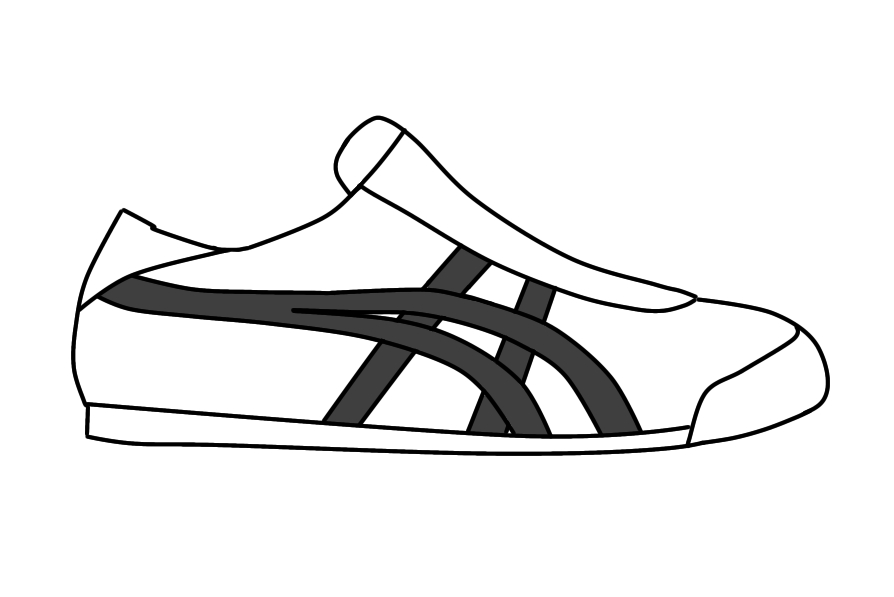
The crossed-stripe design introduced as the Mexico line in 1966

In 1966, following an internal design competition, the company introduced the Mexico line, consisting of two pairs of intersecting stripes. The design later became associated with Onitsuka Tiger, Asics Tiger and Asics footwear.

Onitsuka footwear became widely used during the international running boom of the late 1960s and early 1970s. In its first shoe guide, published in 1967, Runner's World rated the Tiger Road Runner as its leading training shoe and the Tiger Marathon as its leading racing shoe. A 1971 survey published by the magazine found that more than 60 per cent of responding readers ran in Tiger shoes.

In 1975, Onitsuka established Onitsuka Tiger GmbH in Düsseldorf, West Germany, as its European base. Finnish runner Lasse Virén wore Onitsuka track spikes when he won the 5,000- and 10,000-metre events at the 1976 Summer Olympics in Montreal.

In 1977, Onitsuka Co., Ltd., GTO Co., Ltd. and JELENK Co., Ltd. merged to form Asics Corporation. The newly formed company introduced the Asics and Asics Tiger brands, and the Onitsuka Tiger name subsequently entered a period of inactivity.

=== Blue Ribbon Sports and Nike ===
In the early 1960s, American runner Phil Knight met representatives of Onitsuka while visiting Japan and began importing and distributing the company's running shoes in the United States. Knight and his former University of Oregon coach Bill Bowerman founded Blue Ribbon Sports in 1964. Its initial business was based on importing and selling Japanese-made running shoes.

One product developed during the relationship was the Cortez, a cushioned training shoe designed by Bowerman. Onitsuka's corporate history dates its United States release to 1969 and states that it was subsequently renamed the Tiger Corsair.

By the early 1970s, Blue Ribbon Sports had begun introducing footwear under the Nike name as its relationship with Onitsuka wound down. In 1973, Blue Ribbon Sports filed a federal lawsuit alleging that Onitsuka had breached their distribution agreement. The dispute included the Cortez, which was then being sold by both companies. A judge allowed both companies to continue selling versions of the shoe but granted Blue Ribbon Sports the right to retain the Cortez name. Onitsuka continued to market its version as the Tiger Corsair.

=== Revival as a fashion brand ===
Asics revived Onitsuka Tiger in Europe in 2002 in response to demand for retro athletic footwear. The company reissued the Mexico 66, Ultimate 81 and Nippon 60, and subsequently introduced a full range of Onitsuka Tiger clothing and accessories.

The first directly managed Onitsuka Tiger store, Onitsuka Tiger Tokyo, opened in 2003. Stores subsequently opened in European cities including Paris, London, Berlin and Amsterdam.

The brand received increased international exposure in 2003 when Uma Thurman wore yellow-and-black Onitsuka Tiger Tai-Chi shoes with a matching outfit in Quentin Tarantino's film Kill Bill: Volume 1.

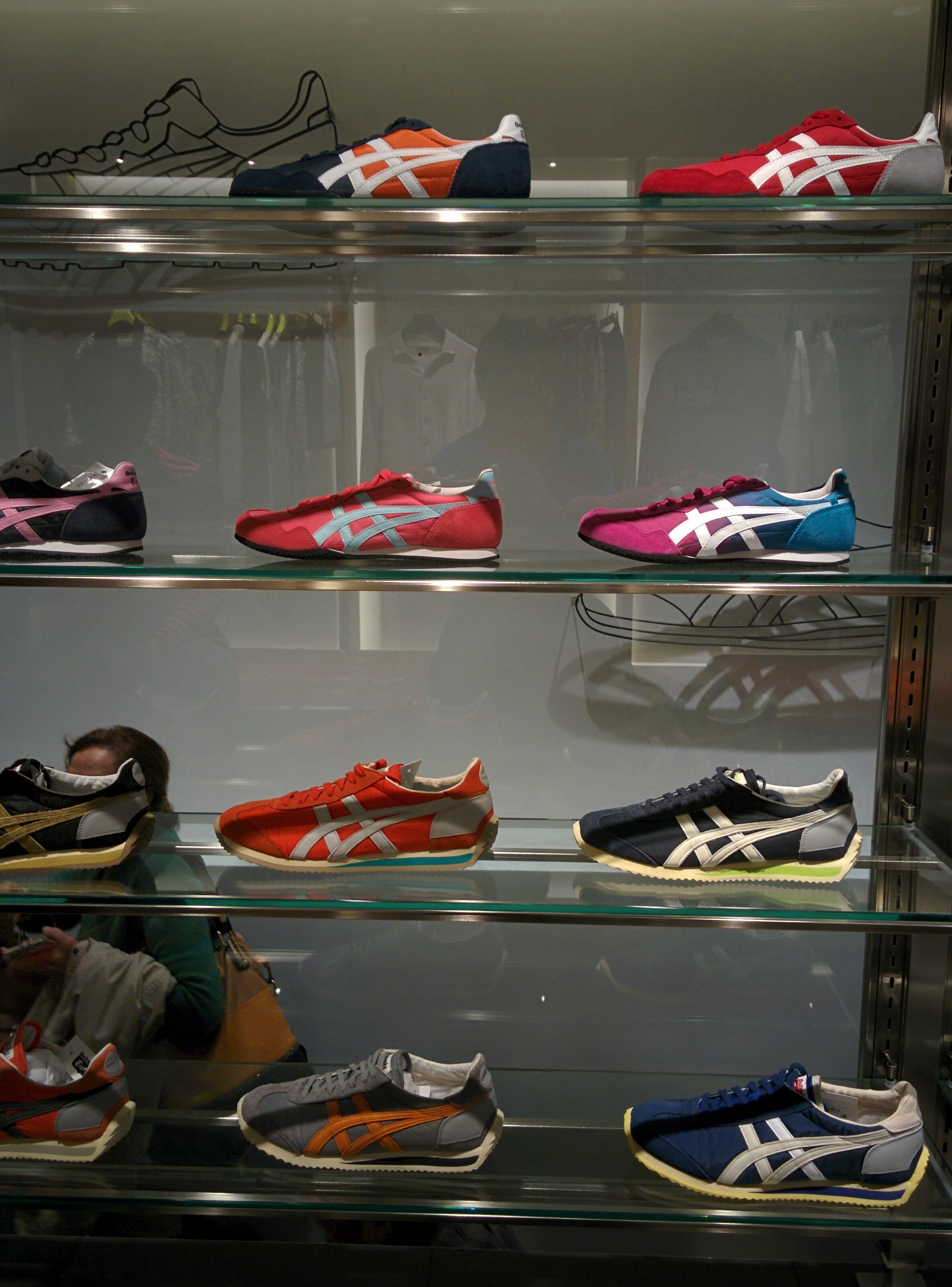
Onitsuka Tiger footwear displayed in an Osaka shop

In 2008, Onitsuka Tiger introduced Nippon Made, a range of shoes manufactured and finished in Japan. The initial models used Japanese leather treated to give them an aged appearance.

Italian designer Andrea Pompilio became the brand's creative director in 2017. Under his direction, Onitsuka Tiger expanded its clothing collections and presented runway collections at Milan Fashion Week.

=== International expansion in the 2020s ===
Onitsuka Tiger's sales declined by 26 per cent in 2020 during the COVID-19 pandemic, but subsequently recovered. Net sales increased by 58.3 per cent from 2023 to 2024, while operating profit rose by 111 per cent during the same period.

The company increasingly concentrated its distribution on directly managed stores and a limited number of other retailers. Growth was supported by a broader fashion shift from thick, heavily cushioned trainers towards narrow, low-profile footwear. The Mexico 66 was one of the principal beneficiaries of this trend.

In the financial year ended 31 December 2025, Onitsuka Tiger's sales increased by 43 per cent to ¥136.5 billion (US$851 million), supported by demand in Europe, international tourism to Japan and a weaker yen. The business recorded an operating profit margin of nearly 38 per cent, the highest among Asics's five principal business categories. Its operating margin was approximately 40 per cent during the first quarter of 2026.

Onitsuka Tiger withdrew from the United States in 2023. Ryoji Shoda, who later became chief executive of OT GROUP, said that the withdrawal was due in part to differences between the management of Asics America and Onitsuka Tiger over the relationship between fashion and sport. In 2026, the brand announced plans to re-enter the American market with a flagship store in Los Angeles in February 2027.

A global flagship store opened on the Champs-Élysées in Paris in July 2025. The store carried footwear, runway collections, denim products and accessories. The brand also expanded into fragrance as part of its strategy to increase the range of products sold alongside its footwear.

On 1 January 2026, the Onitsuka Innovative Factory began operating in Tottori Prefecture, the birthplace of Kihachiro Onitsuka, as the brand's first dedicated production and development facility. The factory collaborates with the Onitsuka Tiger Design Center in Milan and the Asics Institute of Sport Science. It produces the Nippon Made series and The Onitsuka formal leather line, and was also established to develop leather bags.

In June 2026, Asics announced that the Onitsuka Tiger business would be transferred to OT GROUP Corporation through an absorption-type company split scheduled to take effect on 1 January 2027. OT GROUP had been established on 25 February 2026 as a wholly owned subsidiary of Asics, with Shoda as president and chief executive. It was designated as the global headquarters for the brand's sales, manufacturing and related operations.

At the time of the announcement, the business operated in approximately 160 countries and regions and had approximately 190 directly managed stores and 2,800 employees. Asics stated that it had no plans to list OT GROUP publicly.

== Brand and products ==
The Mexico 66 is Onitsuka Tiger's best-known model. Introduced as part of the brand's revival in 2002, it is based on designs from the company's sporting archives and incorporates the crossed stripes introduced with the Mexico line in 1966. It is marketed primarily as fashion footwear rather than as a competition shoe.

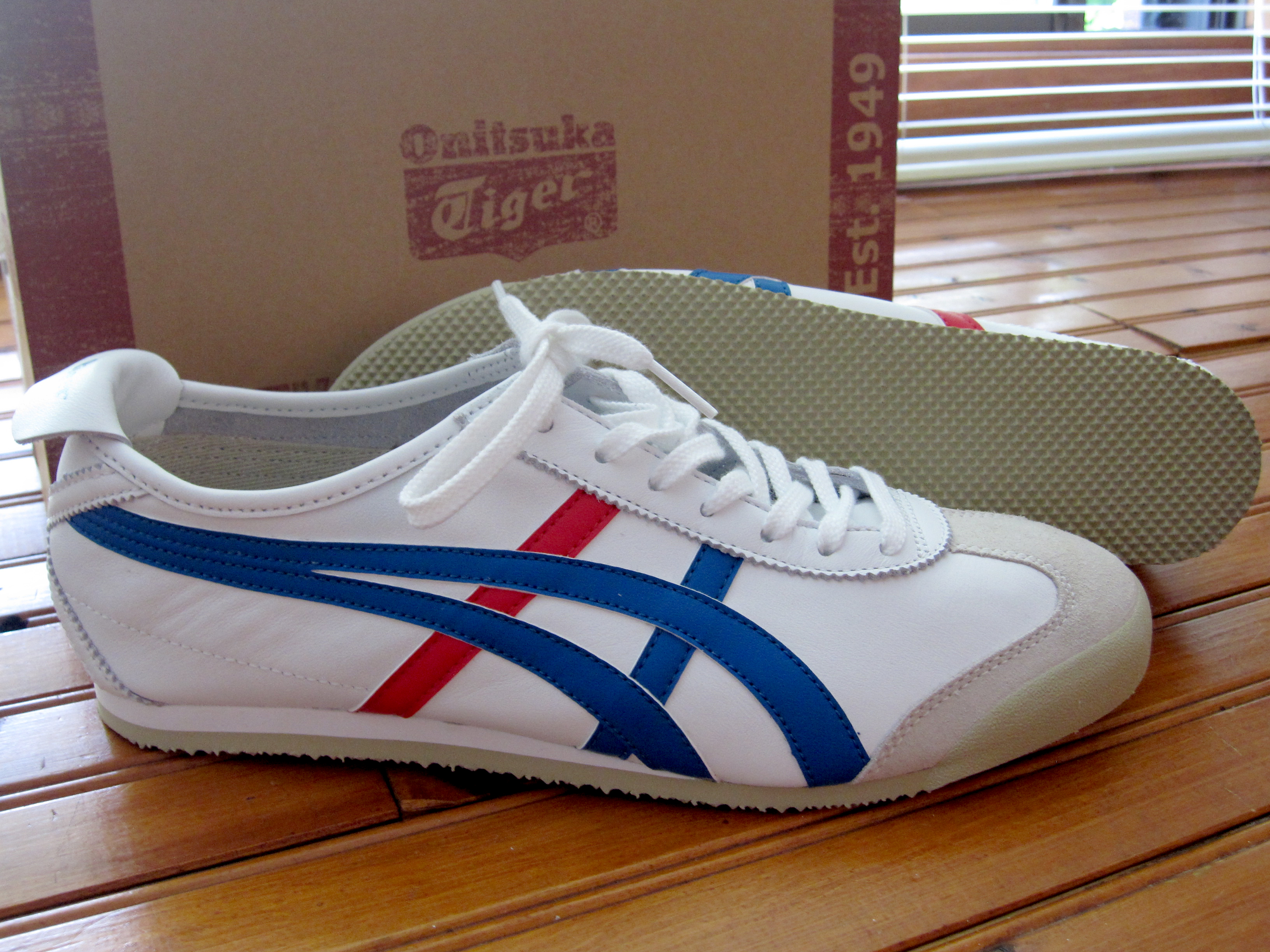
A white, blue and red Mexico 66

Nippon Made consists of footwear manufactured and finished in Japan. Depending on the model, its production may involve processes such as leather dyeing, washing and hand-finishing.

The Onitsuka is a line of formal leather footwear and accessories made in Japan. Production of both Nippon Made and The Onitsuka products was incorporated into the Onitsuka Innovative Factory after it opened in 2026.

The brand also produces seasonal clothing, bags, denim products and other accessories. During the 2020s, it expanded into fragrance and increased its participation in international fashion events. Asics continued to market its namesake brand primarily through performance-sports products, while Onitsuka Tiger concentrated on fashion collections and directly managed retail stores.
