= Nike timeline =

History of the sportswear company

The following is a timeline of notable events in the history of Nike, Inc.

== The 1960s ==
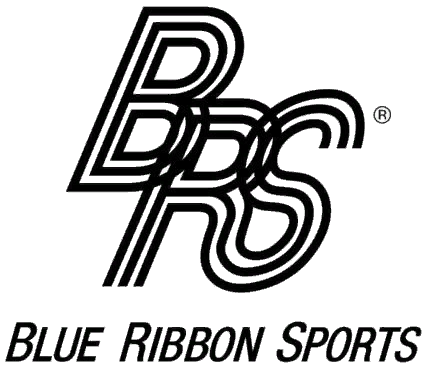

- Established as "Blue Ribbon Sports" by University of Oregon track athlete Phil Knight and his coach, Bill Bowerman, on January 25, 1964. The company initially operated in Eugene, Oregon as a distributor for Japanese shoe maker Onitsuka Tiger, making most sales at track meets out of Knight's automobile. In its first year in business, BRS sold 1,300 pairs of Japanese running shoes grossing $8,000. By 1965, sales had reached $20,000. In 1966, BRS opened its first retail store at 3107 Pico Boulevard in Santa Monica, California. In 1967, due to increasing sales, BRS expanded retail and distribution operations on the East Coast, in Wellesley, Massachusetts.

== The 1970s ==
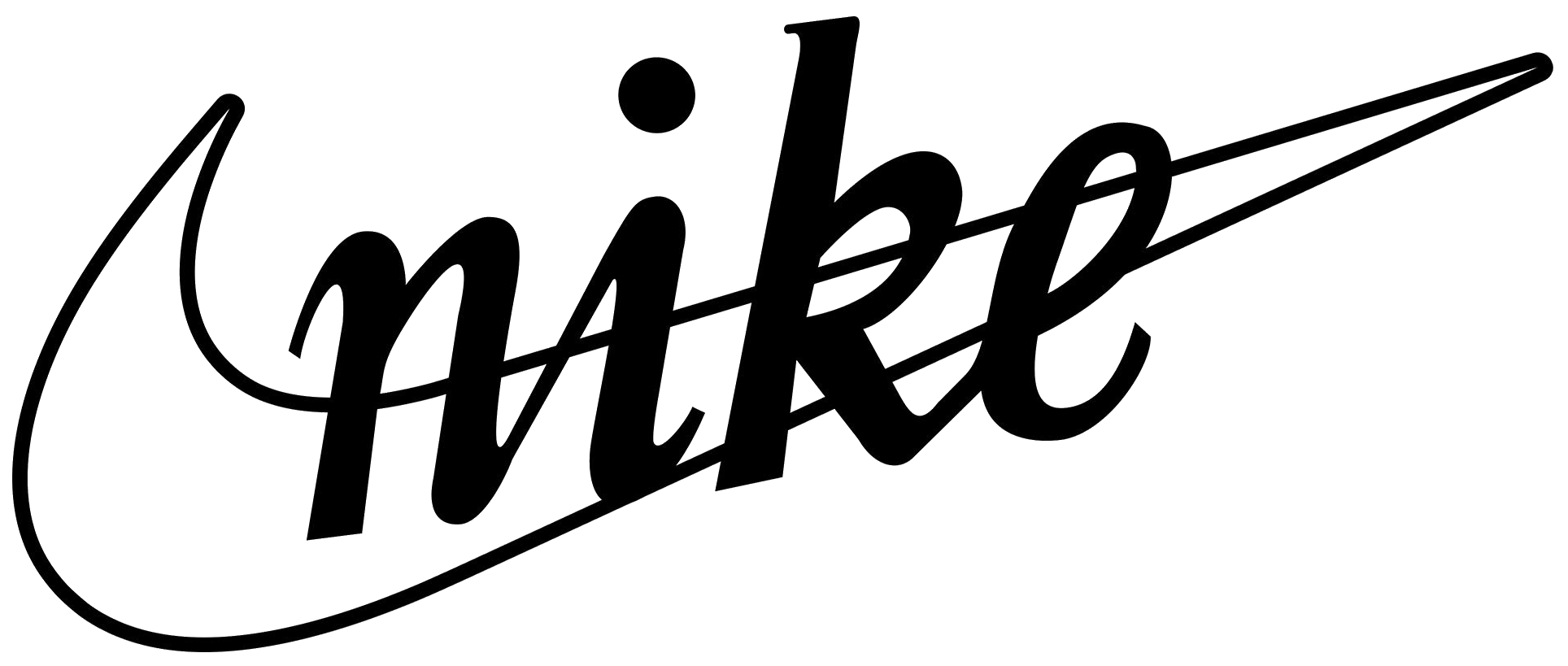

- 1971
  - Graphic designer Carolyn Davidson created the famous Nike 'Swoosh' logo and sold it to the company for US$35.00.
  - Renamed from Blue Ribbon Sports, and debuted the waffle iron trainers invented by Bill Bowerman.
- 1979
  - Nike manufactured its first uniforms for a professional sports team in 1979 when its jersey for the Portland Timbers of the North American Soccer League debuted.

== The 1980s ==
- 1982
  - Nike Introduced their most popular shoe, the Nike Air Force 1. It was also the first Nike Basketball shoe to Introduce Nike Air Technology.
  - Ian Rush becomes the first soccer player sponsored by Nike.
- 1983
  - Nike introduces the Pegasus, the first edition of a successful line of running shoes that continues to this day.
  - Nike also starts making clothing
  - Air Jordans were first introduced in 1984 exclusively for Michael Jordan. They were released to the public in April 1985.

== The 1990s ==
  - The first Nike store opens in downtown Portland.
  - Nike opens its world headquarters in unincorporated Washington County, just west of Portland, on 74 acres (0.3 km^{2}) of land.
- 1993
  - Nike introduces Reuse-A-Shoe, which collects athletic shoes,
  - Nike wins Advertiser of the Year at the Cannes Advertising Festival.
  - Nike enters the ice hockey market after acquiring Canstar, the parent company of hockey equipment manufacturer Bauer Hockey. Nike had only made hockey jerseys, specifically those of the Edmonton Oilers at the height of Wayne Gretzky-mania, but now began to make all equipment.
  - Nike moves into English football, signing a kit (uniform/apparel) deal with Arsenal.
- 1994
  - Paolo Maldini and Romário become some of the first players to wear Nike's boots at the FIFA World Cup during that year's edition.
- 1995
  - Nike signs long-term partnerships with the Brazilian and United States soccer teams.
- 1996
  - Nike signs Tiger Woods soon after he gives up his amateur golf status.
  - Nike causes controversy with its advertising campaign during the Summer Olympics in Atlanta which features the slogan, "You Don't Win Silver — You Lose Gold." Nike's use of this slogan draws harsh criticism from many sources, including - not surprisingly - several former Olympic silver and bronze medalists.
  - Niketown Los Angeles opens in Beverly Hills.
- 1997
  - Nike signs several hockey stars, including Sergei Fedorov and Jeremy Roenick, to endorsement deals to wear their new line of skates, which are noticeably different due to their unique colors and design. Fedorov especially became known for his unique "all-white" Nike skates, which were radically different from the normally black standard hockey skates. Although Wayne Gretzky would eventually wear the all-white Nike skates in his final season, Nike decided to make more traditional skates for their next product line.
- 1998
  - Phil Knight commits Nike to standards for its affiliated manufacturing facilities, including: minimum wage; air quality; education programs; expansion of microloan program; factory monitoring; and enhanced transparency of Nike's corporate social responsibility practices.
  - Nike Introduces the first "tennis shoe" style golf shoe into the market. The trend of comfortable golf shoes starts.
  - Introduction of the first Nike golf balls.
- 1999
  - Bill Bowerman, co-founder of Nike, dies on Dec. 24 at age 88.

== The 2000s ==
- 2000
  - Nike Shox cushioning/support system is introduced, initially worn by Vince Carter and others on the US Olympic basketball team.
- 2002
  - Nike purchases Hurley International, an action sports clothing company, for an undisclosed amount.
  - NikeGO launches, a grassroots initiative to increase physical activity among youths aged 9–15.
  - Nike become the apparel sponsor of Manchester United until 2010.
  - Nike SB, Nike's Skateboarding line, debuts.
  - Introduction of the first Nike golf clubs.
- 2003
  - Nike acquires once-bankrupt rival Converse for $305 million on July 9.
  - For the first time in the company's history, international sales exceed USA sales.
  - Nike is again (also in 1994) named "Advertiser of the Year" by the Cannes Advertising Festival.
  - Nike signs NBA player LeBron James with an unprecedented $87 million endorsement contract.
  - Nike launches a partnership with football player Cristiano Ronaldo.
- 2004
  - Phil Knight steps down as the CEO and President of Nike, but continues as chairman. Knight is replaced by William D. Perez as CEO of Nike, effective Dec. 28.
  - Nike creates the Exeter Brands Group, a wholly owned subsidiary for athletic footwear and apparel brands for lower price points. Brands include Starter, Team Starter, Asphalt, Shaq, and Dunkman.
  - Annual revenues exceed $12.26 billion
- 2005
  - Nike reports annual revenue for fiscal year 2005 (ending May 31) of $13.74 billion, a 12% increase over the previous fiscal year.
  - Nike Signs Tennis Pro Rafael Nadal.
  - Nike introduces Nike Free.
- 2006
  - Nike enters the cricket market with a 5-year sponsorship of the Indian cricket team for US$43m.
- 2007
  - CEO William Perez leaves Nike on January 23, 2006. Perez said in the statement that he and Knight "weren't entirely aligned on some aspects of how to best lead the company's long-term growth. It became obvious to me that the long-term interests of the company would be best served by my resignation."
  - Mark Parker replaces Perez as CEO. Parker had been brand co-president of the company, and joined Nike in 1979.
  - Nike and Apple release the Nike+iPod sports kit, enabling runners to log and monitor their runs via iTunes and the Nike+ website.
  - Nike reports annual revenue for fiscal year 2006 (ending May 31) of $15 billion.
  - Nike introduces the Second Coming, a group of NBA basketball players who best represent the Nike Basketball.
  - Nike introduces AF25, after 25 years of Air Force shoe line.
- 2009
  - Nike sells its Nike Bauer hockey equipment division.
  - Nike introduces shoes featuring new Flywire and Lunarlite Foam materials. Flywire is a new technology made up of thin wires of vectran fibers, which are 5 times stronger than steel and never lose strength. Lunar Foam is a material developed by NASA that gives the shoe excellent shock absorption and a great feel with minimal weight.
  - Nike reports annual revenue for fiscal year 2008 (ending May 31) of $18.6 billion, a 14% increase over the previous fiscal year
  - Dwyane Wade moves from one Nike subsidiary to another, switching from Converse to Jordan Brand.

== The 2010s ==
- 2012
  - Nike introduces Flyknit, a threading technology allowing lighter and more breathable shoe upper.
- 2016
  - Nike exits the golf equipment market.
- 2017
  - Nike introduces the HyperAdapt 1.0 which were inspired from the Air Mags in the and designed by - Ndima Mbambalala Back to the Future Part II movie.
  - The Vaporfly 4% running shoe was introduced, inspired by the Breaking2 attempt to break the 2-hour marathon barrier. This shoe main feature is a carbon fiber plate in the midsole for improved propulsion and energy return.

== The 2020s ==
- 2024
  - Nike signs a controversial kit deal with the German Football Association, marking the end of their 70 year partnership with Adidas.
  - Nike introduces the Hyperboot, a shoe offering heat and air-compressed massages made in collaboration with athletic recovery company Hyperice. The shoe was first tested by athletes at the 2024 Summer Olympics and released in 2025.
