= Fly wire =

Fly wire, Fly-wire, Flywire or Fly Wire may refer to:

- Flywire (company), a former unicorn startup company
- Flywire (screen), a window screen of wire gauze
- Flywire (thread), a special thread construction used in sneaker manufacturing by Nike
- Flywire (equipment), wire that isn't visible to the audience and attaches to harnesses used by riggers for wire-flying
- Fly-wire (wire), an enameled wire for circuit patching

== See also ==
- Flying wire
- Fly by wire (disambiguation)
- Jumper wire
- Wrap wire
