= Susan Arnold =

American businesswoman (born 1954)

- Born: March 8, 1954 (age 72); Pittsburgh, Pennsylvania, U.S.
- Occupation: Executive
- Employer: The Walt Disney Company
- Title: Chairman
- Term: 2021–2023
- Predecessor: Bob Iger (2012–2021)
- Successor: Mark Parker (2023-2025)

Susan E. Arnold (born March 8, 1954) is an American business executive who formerly served as the chairman of The Walt Disney Company.

== Early life and education ==
Arnold graduated from the University of Pennsylvania with a Bachelor of Arts degree, and from the University of Pittsburgh with a Master of Business Administration degree.

== Career ==
Susan Arnold began her career as a brand assistant for the Dawn/Ivory Snow Group at Procter Gamble in 1980. In 1999, she assumed global responsibility for Procter & Gamble's beauty business, thereby becoming the first woman to reach a president-level position in the company. She stepped down from her position at Procter & Gamble on September 1, 2009.

Between 2013 and 2021, Arnold served as an operating executive of The Carlyle Group. She is based in New York. Arnold has served on the board of directors of The Walt Disney Company since 2007, as well as the Carlyle portfolio investments company NBTY, The Nature's Bounty Co. She has also been a member of the Board of Directors of McDonald's Co. since 2008. In 2004 she became Vice Chairman of Procter & Gamble and President of the company in 2007.

On December 1, 2021, Arnold was appointed to replace Bob Iger as chair of the board at The Walt Disney Company and became the first woman to be appointed to this position in the 98-year history of Disney. She was elected chair on December 31, 2021. On January 11, 2023, Disney announced that Arnold would no longer serve as the board's chair after the next annual shareholder meeting and would be replaced by former Nike CEO Mark Parker.

== Personal life ==
Arnold is openly lesbian. Since 2002, she has been listed on Fortune magazine's 50 Most Powerful Women in Business as #7 in 2008. In 2004 and 2005, she was listed on the Wall Street Journal's 50 Women to Watch. She was listed multiple times on the Forbes list of The World's Most Powerful Women and in 2005 she was No. 16 on Forbes' The World's 100 Most Powerful Women list. She served for several years on the executive committee of Catalyst, a nonprofit organization working toward the advancement of women in business. In June 2022, she was recognized by the International Hospitality Institute on the Global 100 in Hospitality as one of the 100 Most Powerful People in Global Hospitality.

Business positions
Preceded by Bob Iger	Disney chairman 2021–2023	Succeeded by Mark Parker
