= Fly by wire =

Fly by wire, Fly-by-wire or Fly by Wire may refer to:

- Fly-by-wire (FBW), electronic flight control system
- Fly by Wire (album), an album by Someone Still Loves You Boris Yeltsin
- Fly by Wire (book), a book about US Airways Flight 1549

== See also ==
- Drive by wire
- Power by wire
- Fly by light
- Fly by optics
- Fly wire (disambiguation)
