= Nike World Headquarters =

Global headquarters for Nike, Inc., Oregon, U.S.

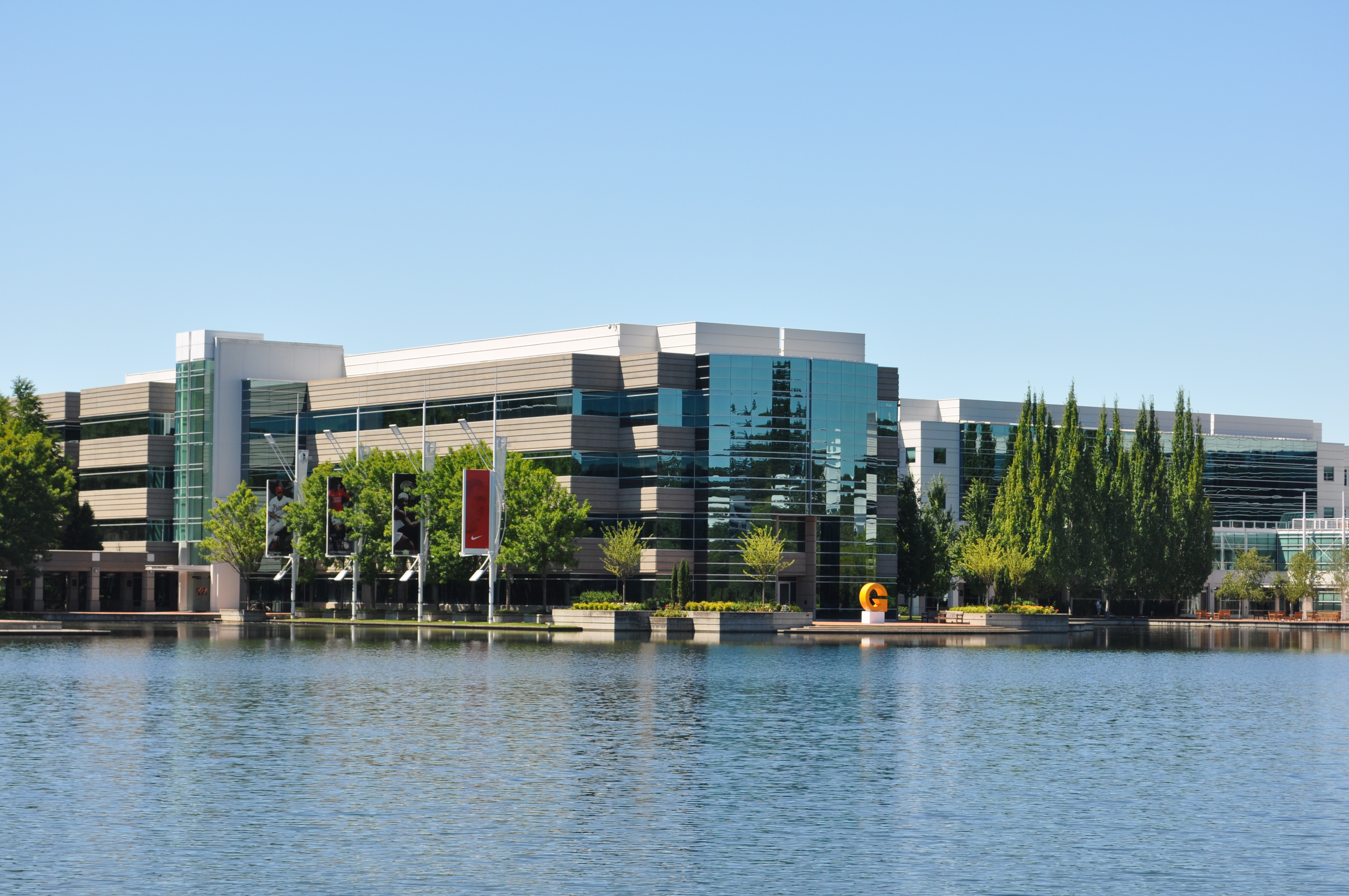
- Headquarters for Nike, Inc., 2010
- Location: Near Beaverton, Oregon, U.S.
- Coordinates: 45°30′38″N 122°49′55″W
- Industry: Sportswear and sports equipment
- Buildings: Over 75
- Area: 286 acres (116 ha)
- Owner: Nike, Inc.

The Nike Worldwide Headquarters is the global headquarters for Nike, Inc., located in an unincorporated area of Washington County near Beaverton, Oregon, in the United States. The campus has more than 75 buildings on 286 acres, as of 2018.

== Buildings ==
The Joe Paterno Center opened in 1992. The Tiger Woods Conference Center, dedicated in 2001, has a statue of Tiger Woods. The C. Vivian Stringer Child Development Center was dedicated in 2008. The campus has buildings named after Serena Williams and LeBron James. The Michael Krzyzewski Fitness Center has a statue of Mike Krzyzewski. Buildings are also named after Ken Griffey Jr., Mia Hamm, Michael Jordan, John McEnroe, Jerry Rice, Nolan Ryan, Joan Benoit Samuelson, and Mike Schmidt. A five-lane running track is named after Michael Johnson.

== History ==
The campus was closed temporarily for deep cleaning during the COVID-19 pandemic. Drake used the campus for the music video for "Laugh Now Cry Later" in 2020.
