= Elliott Hill =

American business executive

Elliott Hill, born 2 October 1963, is the president and CEO of Nike. Hill initially retired from Nike prior to John Donahoe being appointed as the chief executive in 2020. In October 2024, Hill came out of retirement to assume the role of president and CEO of Nike, replacing Donahoe.

== Career ==
Prior to joining Nike, Hill was an assistant athletic trainer with the Dallas Cowboys. Hill was with Nike for more than 32 years by the time of his initial retirement, after starting as an intern in 1988. Hill worked across various departments in Nike and was posted both in North America and Europe. His final roles prior to his 2020 pause involved overseeing commercial and marketing operations for Nike and its Jordan Brand.
