= John Donahoe =

American sports executive (born 1960)

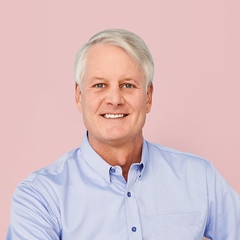
- Donahoe in 2019

Current position
- Title: Athletic director
- Team: Stanford
- Conference: ACC

Biographical details
- Born: April 30, 1960 (age 66); Evanston, Illinois, US
- Education: Dartmouth College (BA); Stanford University (MBA)

John Joseph Donahoe II (born April 30, 1960) is an American businessman who is the athletic director of Stanford University. He was the CEO of Nike from January 2020 to October 2024. Early in his career, he worked for Bain & Company, becoming the firm's president and CEO in 1999. He is on the board of directors at The Bridgespan Group and is chairman of PayPal. Donahoe was named president and CEO of ServiceNow, a cloud company, in February 2017. He was on the Board of Trustees of Dartmouth College from 2003 to 2012.

In July 2025, he was named athletic director at Stanford University, effective September 8.

== Early life ==
John Donahoe was born in Evanston, Illinois on April 30, 1960. His father was an accountant at Price Waterhouse in Chicago. In 1978, he graduated from New Trier High School in Winnetka, Illinois. He earned a bachelor's degree in economics from Dartmouth College, where he was a brother of Chi Gamma Epsilon fraternity (formerly Kappa Sigma), followed by an MBA from Stanford Graduate School of Business. Donahoe is of Irish descent.

== Career ==
After Donahoe's senior year of high school, a friend's father asked him to work at his Schlitz beer distribution company. "You'll make good money," he said. It was a union job and the first requirement was that he join the International Brotherhood of Teamsters.

Before joining eBay, Donahoe worked for Bain & Company (a global consulting firm based in Boston) for 20 years, starting as an associate consultant and rising to become the firm's president and CEO in 1999.

In March 2005, Donahoe was hired as president of eBay Marketplaces. His role was to focus on eBay's core business, which accounts for a large percentage of the company's revenues. In 2008, Donahoe was appointed CEO of eBay. He made more than 40 acquisitions, including Shopping.com and StubHub, and the classifieds sites Gumtree and LoQUo, and most recently, Shutl. After Donahoe's departure from eBay in 2015, he was succeeded by eBay Marketplaces president Devin Wenig.

In February 2017, Donahoe was announced as the president and CEO of ServiceNow, a software company that he became familiar with while working at eBay.

In October 2019, Donahoe was announced as the next CEO of Nike, and succeeded Mark Parker on January 13, 2020. Donahoe's tech background made him attractive since Nike had aimed to expand beyond sportswear and become a tech company. He did successfully navigate the COVID pandemic, which hit two months after his hiring, thanks to his tech prowess which helped Nike handle a surge in demand cause by e-commerce's boom. However, his lack of retail experience, as well as reducing wholesale middlemen, cost Nike market share in its core product of shoes, and the company began an ongoing corporate and financial decline beginning in 2021. It was announced that Donahoe was stepping down as Nike's CEO in September 2024, being replaced by longtime Nike employee Elliott Hill. Donahoe's last day as CEO was October 12, but continued as an advisor until January 2025.

In July 2025, he was named athletic director at Stanford University, effective September 8.

=== Board directorships ===
Donahoe was on the Board of Trustees of Dartmouth College from 2003 to 2012.

Donahoe was chairman of The Business Council.

Donahoe serves on the board of the 1803 Fund, which was established by a $400 million pledge from Nike founder Phil Knight and his wife, Penny Knight.

== Compensation ==
In 2023, Donahoe received total compensation from Nike of $32.8 million.

== Political donations ==
Donahoe has donated to Democrats and Republicans. He contributed to Republican Congressman David Dreier of California, as well as two Democratic Senate candidates, Kirsten Gillibrand of New York and Barbara Boxer of California.

== Personal life ==
He is married to Eileen Donahoe (née Chamberlain), former U.S. Ambassador to the United Nations Human Rights Council in Geneva, Switzerland. They have four children; three sons and a daughter, and live in Portola Valley, California.

Business positions
Preceded by Meg Whitman	President and CEO of eBay; March 31, 2008 – July 19, 2015	Succeeded by Devin Wenig
Preceded by Mark Parker	CEO of Nike; January 13, 2020 – October 12, 2024	Succeeded by Elliott Hill
