= Nike, Inc. =

American athletic equipment company

Coordinates: 45.5093°N 122.8299°W

- Swoosh logo used since 1995

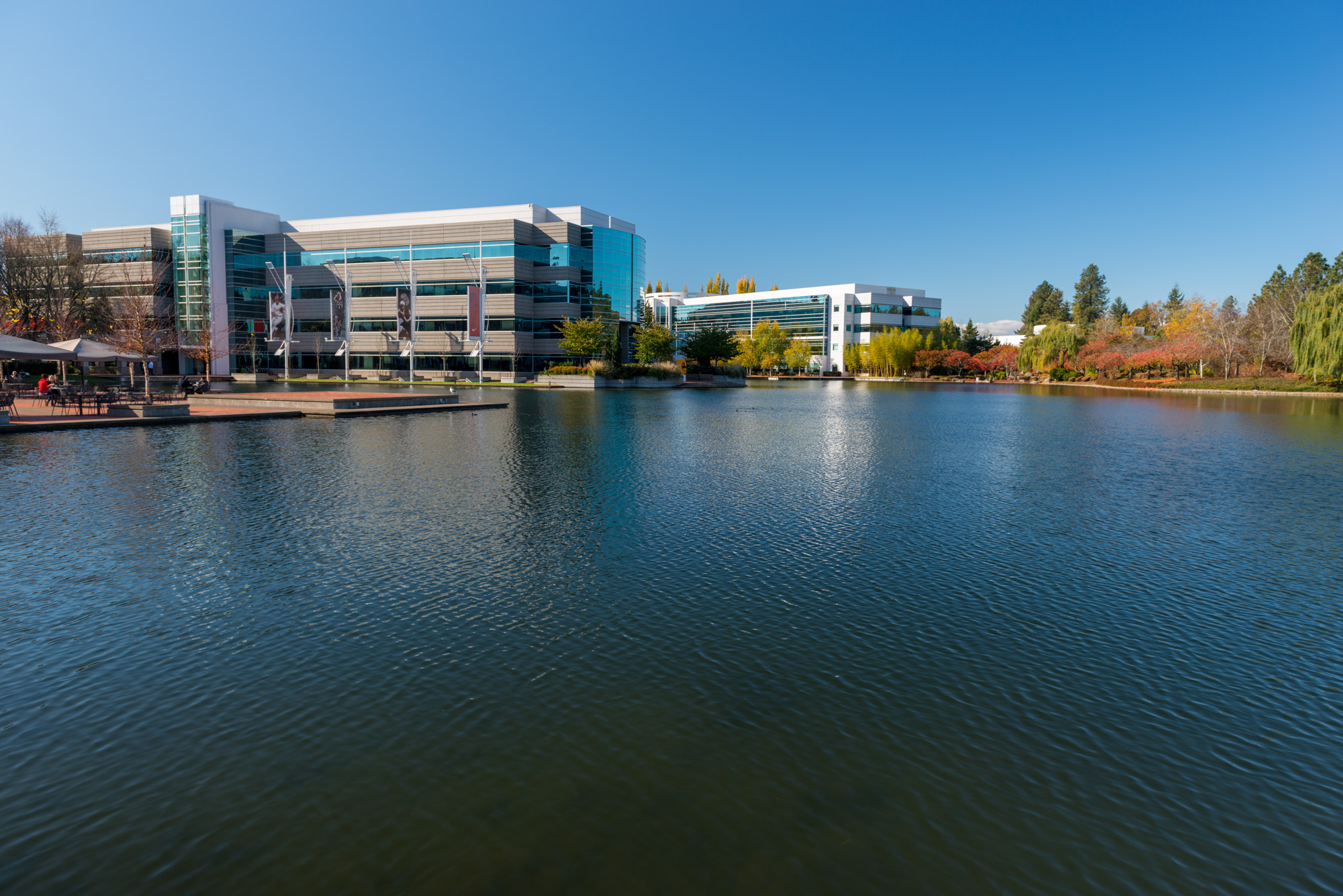
- Headquarters near Beaverton, Oregon, US
- Formerly: Blue Ribbon Sports, Inc. (1964–1971)
- Type: Public
- Traded as: NYSE: NKE (Class B); DJIA component; S&P 500 component
- ISIN: US6541061031
- Industry: Apparel; Accessories; Sports equipment
- Founded: January 25, 1964; 62 years ago
- Founders: Bill Bowerman; Phil Knight
- Headquarters: Nike World Headquarters, Washington County, Oregon, U.S.
- Area served: Worldwide
- Key people: Philip Knight (chairman emeritus); Mark Parker (executive chairman); Elliott Hill (president and CEO)
- Products: Athletic shoes; athletic apparel; sporting goods; accessories
- Revenue: ▼US$46.3 billion (2025)
- Operating income: ▼US$3.70 billion (2025)
- Net income: ▼US$3.22 billion (2025)
- Total assets: ▼US$36.6 billion (2025)
- Total equity: ▼US$13.2 billion (2025)
- Number of employees: 77,800 (2025)
- Subsidiaries: Converse
- Website: nike.com

Nike, Inc. (Note: The pronunciations of "Nike" include /ˈnaɪki/ NY-kee officially and in the US, as well as /naɪk/ NYKE in the UK.) is an American athletic footwear and apparel corporation headquartered near Beaverton, Oregon. It is the world's largest supplier of athletic shoes and apparel and a major manufacturer of sports equipment, with revenue in excess of US$46 billion in its fiscal year 2022.

The company was founded on January 25, 1964, as "Blue Ribbon Sports", by Bill Bowerman and Phil Knight, and officially became Nike, Inc. on May 30, 1971. The company takes its name from Nike, the Greek goddess of victory. Nike markets its products under its own brand, as well as Nike Golf, Nike Pro, Nike+, Nike Blazers, Air Force 1, Nike Dunk, Air Max, Foamposite, Nike Skateboarding and Nike CR7. The company also sells products under its Air Jordan brand and its Converse subsidiary. Nike also owned Bauer Hockey from 1995 to 2008, and previously owned Cole Haan, Umbro, and Hurley International. In addition to manufacturing sportswear and equipment, the company operates retail stores under the Niketown name. Nike sponsors many high-profile athletes and sports teams around the world, with the highly recognized trademarks of "Just Do It" and the Swoosh logo.

As of 2024, it employed 83,700 people worldwide. In 2020, the brand alone was valued in excess of $32 billion, making it the most valuable brand among sports businesses. Previously, in 2017, the Nike brand was valued at $29.6 billion. Nike ranked 89th in the 2018 Fortune 500 list of the largest United States corporations by revenue. The company ranked 239th in the Forbes Global 2000 companies in 2024.

== History ==
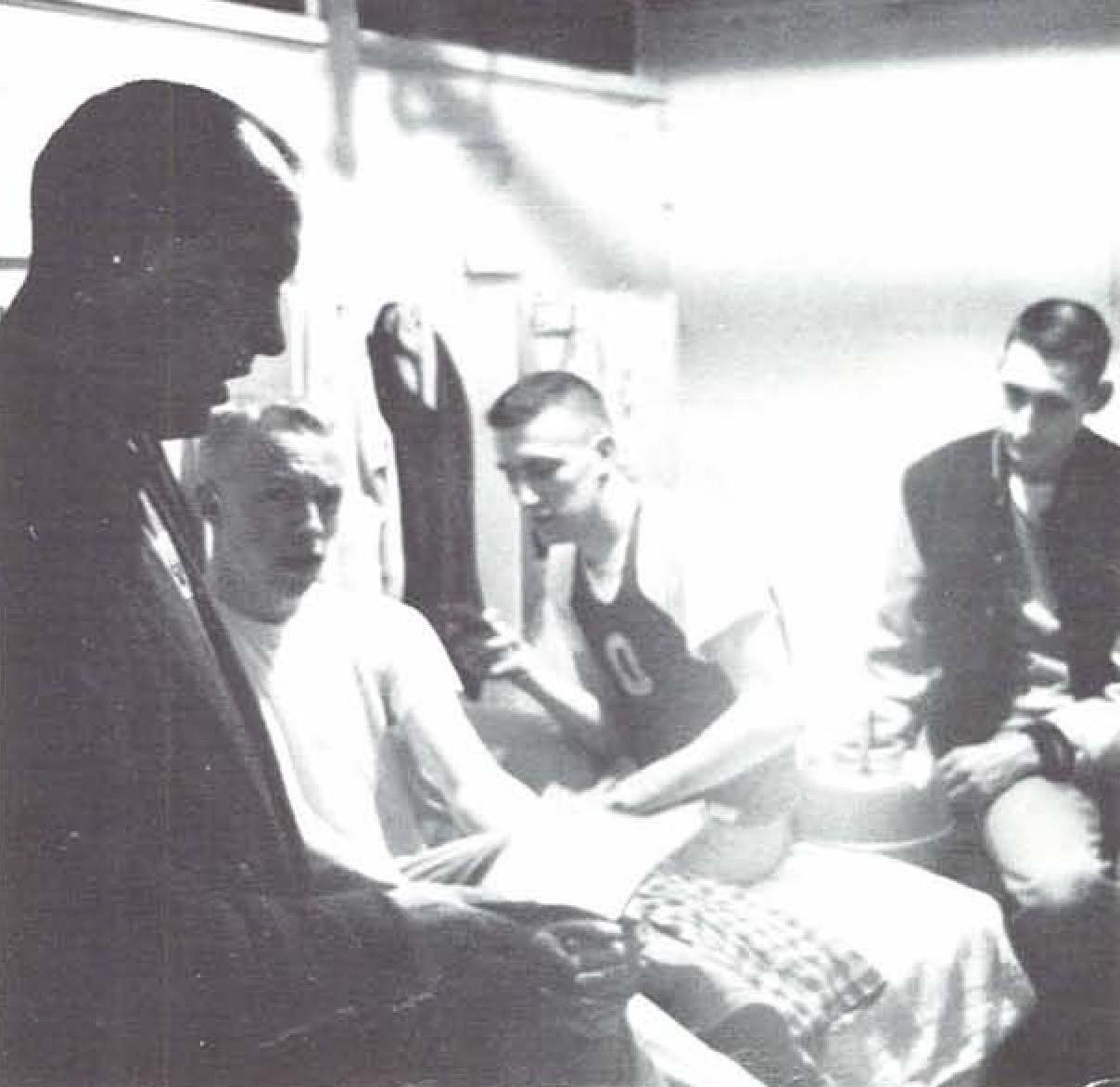
Bill Bowerman (left) conversing with Phil Knight (second from left) and two other members of the Oregon track team, 1958.

Nike, originally known as Blue Ribbon Sports (BRS), was founded by University of Oregon track athlete Phil Knight and his coach, Bill Bowerman, on January 25, 1964. The company initially operated in Eugene, Oregon, as a distributor for Japanese shoemaker Onitsuka Tiger, making most sales at track meets out of Knight's automobile.

According to Otis Davis, a University of Oregon student-athlete coached by Bowerman and Olympic gold medalist at the 1960 Summer Olympics, his coach made the first pair of Nike shoes for him, contradicting a claim that they were made for Phil Knight. According to Davis, "I told Tom Brokaw that I was the first. I don't care what all the billionaires say. Bill Bowerman made the first pair of shoes for me. People don't believe me. In fact, I didn't like the way they felt on my feet. There was no support and they were too tight. But I saw Bowerman made them from the waffle iron, and they were mine".

In its first year in business, BRS sold 1,300 pairs of Japanese running shoes, grossing $8,000. By 1965, sales had reached $20,000. In 1966, BRS opened its first retail store at 3107 Pico Boulevard in Santa Monica, California. In 1967, due to increasing sales, BRS expanded retail and distribution operations on the East Coast, in Wellesley, Massachusetts.

In 1971, Bowerman used his wife's waffle iron to experiment on rubber to create a new sole for track shoes that would grip but be lightweight and increase the runner's speed. Oregon's Hayward Field was transitioning to an artificial surface, and Bowerman wanted a sole which could grip to grass or bark dust without the use of spikes. Bowerman was talking to his wife about this puzzle over breakfast, when the waffle iron idea came into play.

Bowerman's design led to the introduction of the "Moon Shoe" in 1972, so named because the waffle tread was said to resemble the footprints left by astronauts on the Moon. Further refinement resulted in the "Waffle Trainer" in 1974, which helped fuel the explosive growth of Blue Ribbon Sports/Nike.

Tension between BRS and Onitsuka Tiger increased in 1971 as the latter attempted a takeover of BRS by extending an ultimatum proposal that would give the Japanese company 51 percent of BRS. In 1972, the relationship between BRS and Onitsuka Tiger came to an end. BRS prepared to launch its own line of footwear. The previous year, it was already able to place from two Japanese shoe manufacturers the company's first independent order for 20,000, which included 6,000 that had the Nike logo. Runner Jeff Johnson was brought in to help market the new brand and was credited for coining the name “Nike”. It would bear the Swoosh newly designed by Carolyn Davidson. The Swoosh was first used by Nike on June 18, 1971, and was registered with the US Patent and Trademark Office on January 22, 1974.

In 1976, the company hired John Brown and Partners, based in Seattle, as its first advertising agency. The following year, the agency created the first "brand ad" for Nike, called "There is no finish line", in which no Nike product was shown. By 1980, Nike had attained a 50% market share in the US athletic shoe market, and the company went public in December of that year.

Wieden+Kennedy, Nike's primary ad agency, has worked with Nike to create many print and television advertisements, and Wieden+Kennedy remains Nike's primary ad agency. It was agency co-founder Dan Wieden who coined the now-famous slogan "Just Do It" for a 1988 Nike ad campaign, which was chosen by Advertising Age as one of the top five ad slogans of the 20th century and enshrined in the Smithsonian Institution. Walt Stack was featured in Nike's first "Just Do It" advertisement, which debuted on July 1, 1988. Wieden credits the inspiration for the slogan to "Let's do it", the last words spoken by Gary Gilmore before he was executed.

Nike manufactured its first uniforms for a professional sports team in 1979, when its jersey for the Portland Timbers of the North American Soccer League debuted. Throughout the 1980s, Nike expanded its product line to encompass many sports and regions throughout the world. In 1990, Nike moved into its eight-building World Headquarters campus in Beaverton, Oregon. The first Nike retail store, dubbed Niketown, opened in downtown Portland in November of that year.

Phil Knight announced in mid-2015 that he would step down as chairman of Nike in 2016. He officially stepped down from all duties with the company on June 30, 2016.

In a company public announcement on March 15, 2018, Nike CEO Mark Parker said Trevor Edwards, a top Nike executive who was seen as a potential successor to the chief executive, was relinquishing his position as Nike's brand president and would retire in August.

In October 2019, John Donahoe was announced as the next CEO, and succeeded Parker on January 13, 2020. In November 2019, the company stopped selling directly through Amazon, focusing more on direct relationships with customers.

In October 2025, Nike renamed its world headquarters in Beaverton, Oregon, the Philip H. Knight Campus in honor of co-founder Phil Knight.

in December 2025, Nike reorganized its senior leadership team, creating a COO and appointing Venkatesh Alagirisamy to the role. The company also eliminated its CTO and CCO positions as part of the restructuring.

In April 2026, Nike announced it would cut approximately 1,400 workers, or about 2% of its workforce. Most of the affected employees work in the technology department. The layoffs were part of a turnaround plan led by CEO Elliott Hill and followed approximately 800 job cuts in January 2026.

In June 2026, Nike announced that David Denton would become its CFO, succeeding Matthew Friend effective August 17. Friend remained with the company through September 4 to assist with the transition.

=== Acquisitions ===
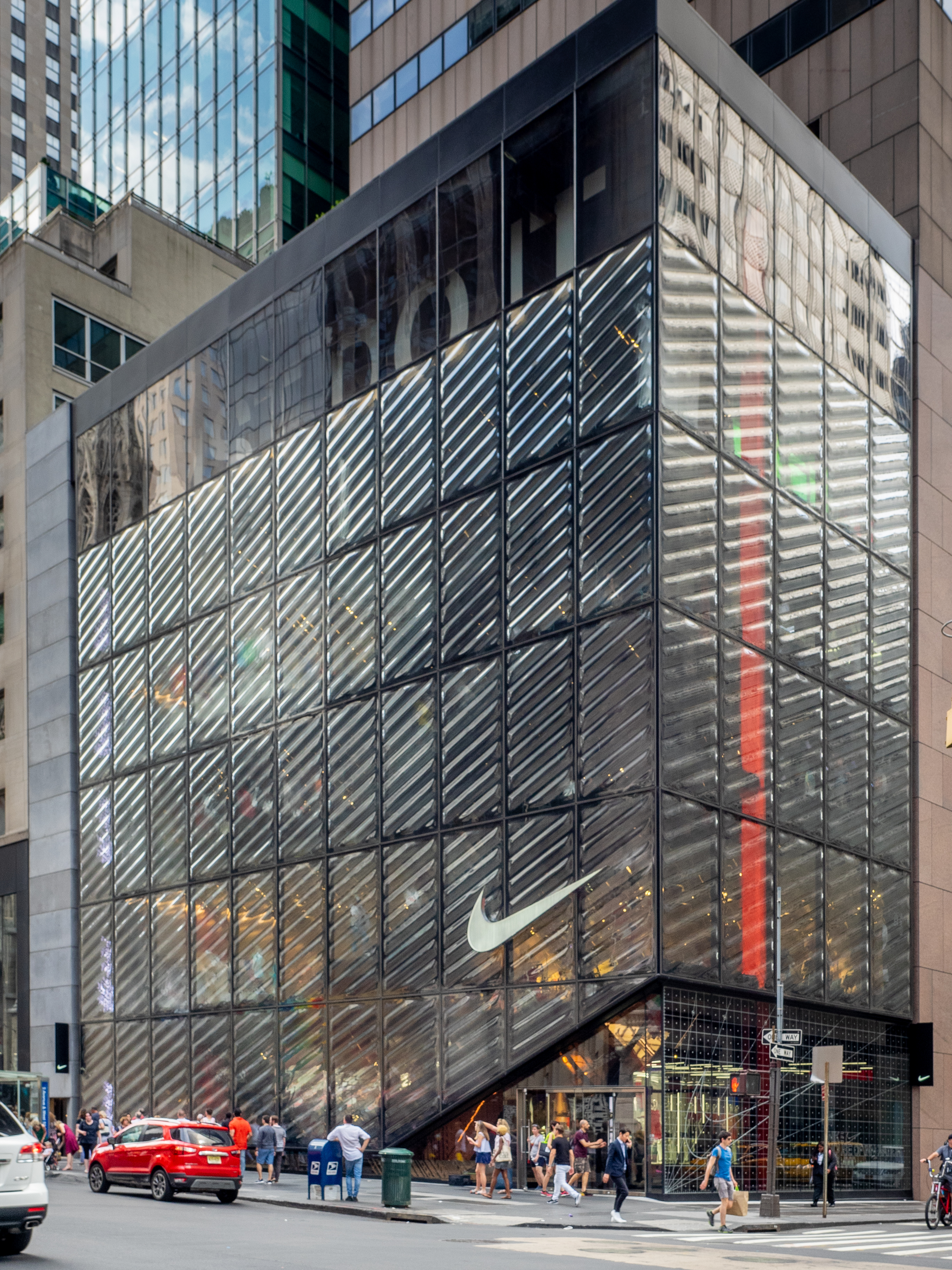
A Nike flagship store in Manhattan

Nike has acquired and sold several apparel and footwear companies over the course of its history. Its first acquisition was the upscale footwear company Cole Haan in 1988, followed by the purchase of Bauer Hockey in 1994. In 2002, Nike bought surf apparel company Hurley International from founder Bob Hurley. In 2003, Nike paid US$309 million to acquire sneaker company Converse. The company acquired Starter in 2004 and soccer uniform maker Umbro in 2007.

In order to refocus its business lines, Nike began divesting itself of some of its subsidiaries in the 2000s. It sold Starter in 2007 and Bauer Hockey in 2008. The company sold Umbro in 2012 and Cole Haan in 2013. As of 2020, Converse is the sole subsidiary of Nike.

Nike acquired Zodiac, a consumer data analytics company, in March 2018. In August 2019, the company acquired Celect, a Boston-based predictive analytics company. In December 2021, Nike purchased RTFKT Studios, a virtual shoe company that makes NFTs.

In February 2021, Nike acquired Datalogue, a New York-based company focused on digital sales and machine learning technology.

=== Finance ===
Nike sales by region (2023)
Region	share
North America	42.2%
Europe, Middle East and Africa	26.2%
Greater China	14.2%
Asia Pacific & Latin America	12.6%
Global	4.9%
Corporate	0.1%

Nike was made a member of the Dow Jones Industrial Average in 2013, when it replaced Alcoa.

On December 19, 2013, Nike's quarterly profit rose due to a 13 percent increase in global orders for merchandise since April of that year. Future orders of shoes or clothes for delivery between December and April, rose to $10.4 billion. Nike shares (NKE) rose 0.6 percent to $78.75 in extended trading.

In November 2015, Nike announced it would initiate a $12 billion share buyback, as well as a two-for-one stock split, with shares to begin trading at the decreased price on December 24. The split will be the seventh in company history.

In June 2018, Nike announced it would initiate a $15 billion share buyback over four years, to begin in 2019 upon completion of the previous buyback program.

For the fiscal year 2018, Nike reported earnings of US$1.933 billion, with annual revenue of US$36.397 billion, an increase of 6.0% over the previous fiscal cycle. Nike's shares traded at over $72 per share, and its market capitalization was valued at over US$114.5 billion in October 2018.

Sales by product (2023)
Product	share
Footwear	64.7%
Apparel	27.0%
Converse	4.7%
Equipment	3.4%
Global Brand	0.1%
Corporate	0.1%

In February 2020, the company said that roughly 75% of Nike stores in Greater China had closed due to the COVID-19 outbreak. In March 2020, Nike reported a 5% drop in Chinese sales associated with stores' closure. It was the first decrease in six years. At the same time, the company's online sales grew by 36% during Q1 of 2020. Also, the sales of personal training apps grew by 80% in China.

In June 2025, Nike warned that President Trump's new tariffs on key trading partners could add around $1 billion to its costs this year, causing the company to shift some production out of China to reduce its exposure. Despite weaker quarterly revenue, Nike's shares rose over 10% after a better-than-expected earnings forecast, while the US and China also reached a deal to ease trade tensions.

In April 2026, the chief operating officer, Venkatesh Alagirisamy announced a cut of about 1,400 global operations jobs, especially from the technology department as part of Nike's business reorganization. In September of that year, Nike exited the S&P 100 after its shares fell by 40 percent.

The key trends of Nike are (as at the financial year ending May 31):

FY	Revenue in billion USD	Net income in billion USD	Total assets in billion USD	Employees
2005	13.7	1.2	8.7	26,000
2006	14.9	1.3	9.8	28,000
2007	16.3	1.4	10.6	30,200
2008	18.6	1.8	12.4	32,500
2009	19.1	1.4	13.2	34,300
2010	19.0	1.9	14.4	34,400
2011	20.1	2.1	14.9	38,000
2012	23.3	2.2	15.4	44,000
2013	25.3	2.4	17.5	48,000
2014	27.7	2.6	18.5	56,500
2015	30.6	3.2	21.5	62,600
2016	32.3	3.7	21.3	70,700
2017	34.3	4.2	23.2	74,400
2018	36.3	1.9	22.5	73,100
2019	39.1	4.0	23.7	76,700
2020	37.4	2.5	31.3	75,400
2021	44.5	5.7	37.7	73,300
2022	46.7	6.0	40.3	79,100
2023	51.2	5.0	37.5	83,700
2024	51.3	5.7	38.1	79,400
2025	46.3	3.2	36.5	77,800

=== Logo evolution ===
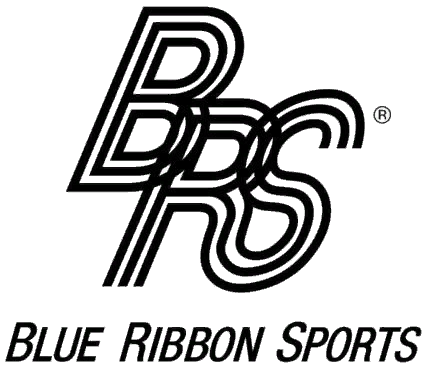
1964–1971

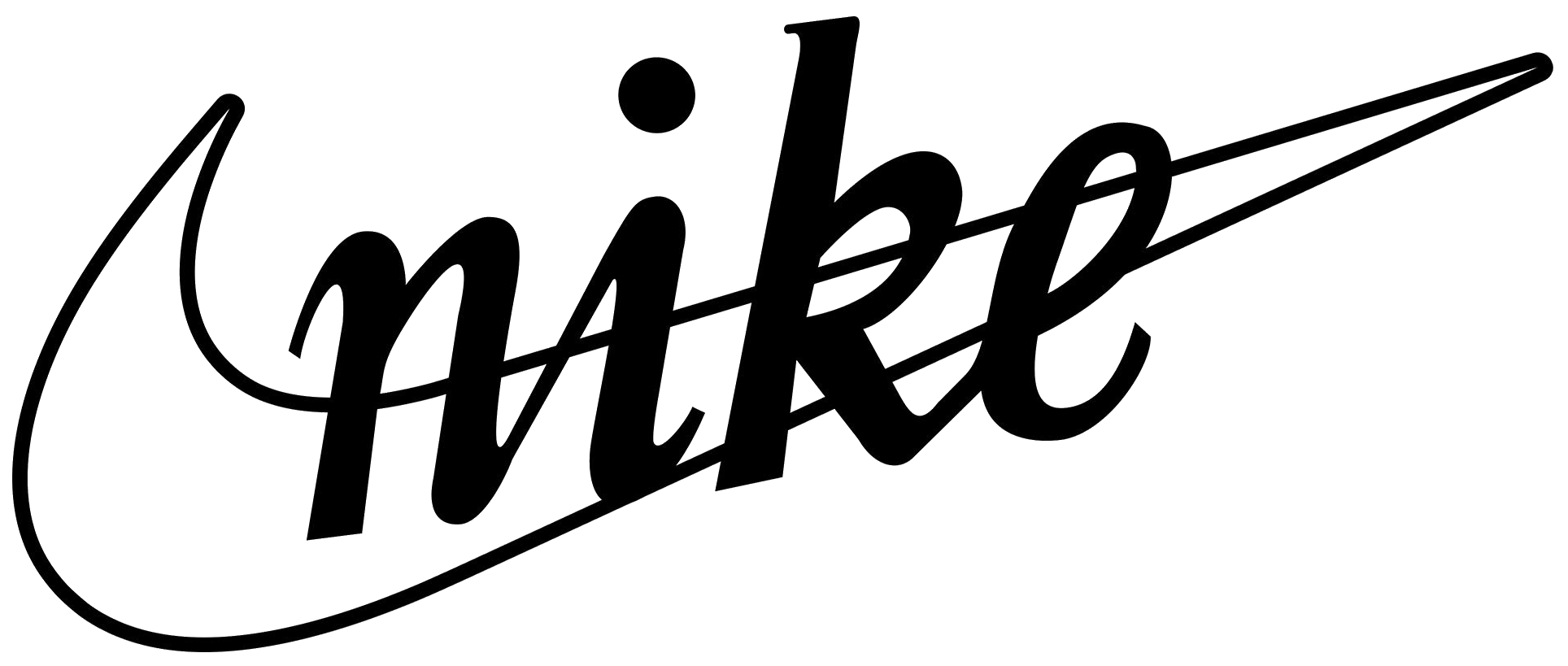
1971–1978 (Note: This logo is still used on some throwback apparel.)

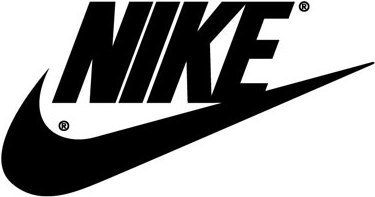
1978–1995 (primary) (Note: This logo is still used as a secondary logo, notably on casual wear apparel.)

1995–present

== Headquarters ==
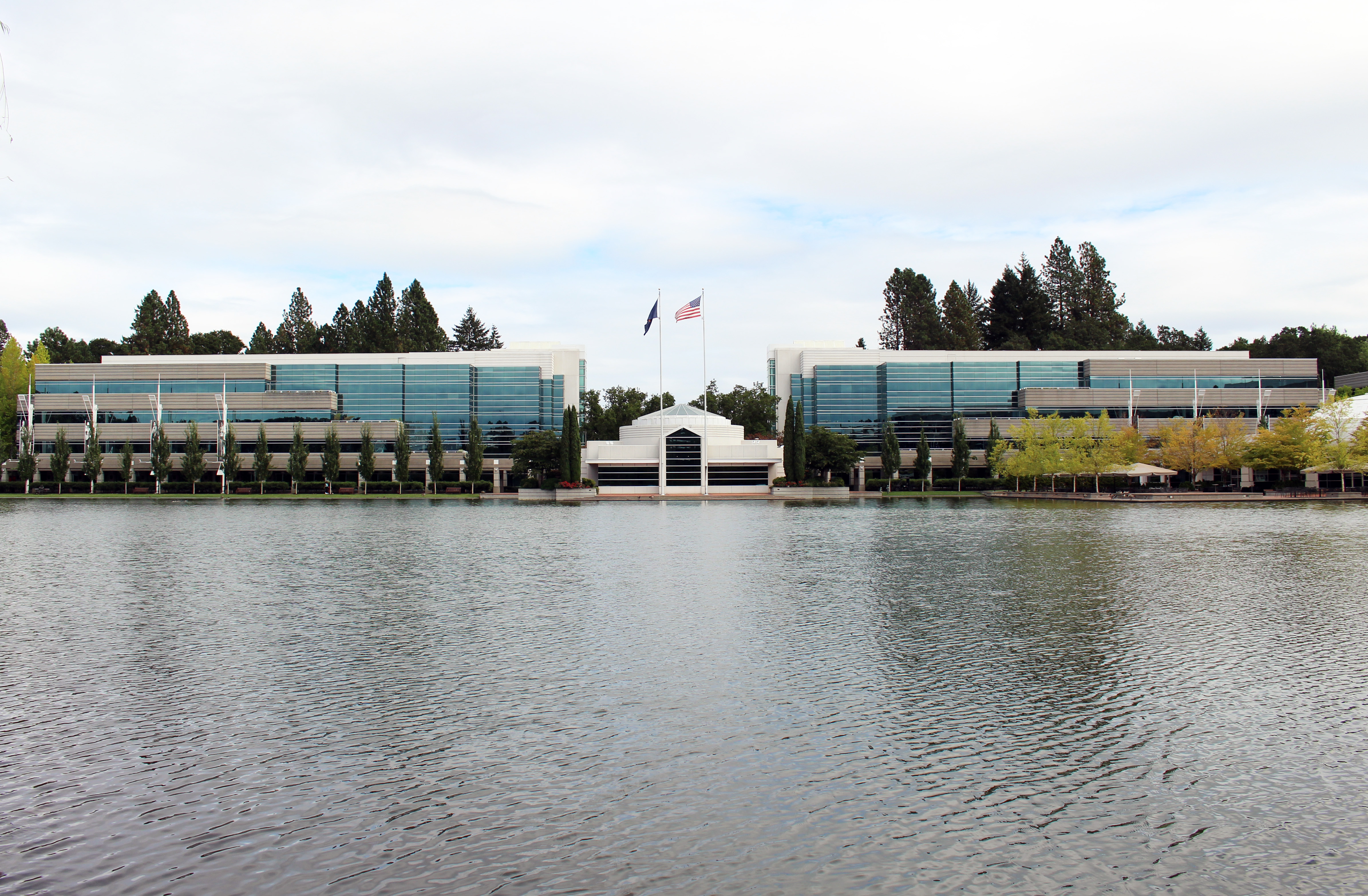
Nike World Headquarters near Beaverton, Oregon

Nike's world headquarters are surrounded by the city of Beaverton but are within unincorporated Washington County. The city attempted to forcibly annex Nike's headquarters, which led to a lawsuit by Nike, and lobbying by the company that ultimately ended in Oregon Senate Bill 887 of 2005. Under that bill's terms, Beaverton is specifically barred from forcibly annexing the land that Nike and Columbia Sportswear occupy in Washington County for 35 years, while Electro Scientific Industries and Tektronix receive the same protection for 30 years.

Nike is planning to build a 3.2 million square foot expansion to its World Headquarters in Beaverton. The design will target LEED Platinum certification and will be highlighted by natural daylight, and a gray water treatment center.

== Ownership ==
Nike is mainly owned by institutional investors, who hold around 68% of all shares. The 10 largest shareholders of Nike in early 2024 were:

- Phil Knight (17.4%)
- Vanguard (7.23%)
- BlackRock (5.93%)
- State Street Global Advisors (3.71%)
- Travis Knight (3.14%)
- Knight Foundation (1.95%)
- Capital Research and Management Company (1.94%)
- Geode Capital Management (1.57%)
- Wellington Management Company (1.48%)
- AllianceBernstein (1.32%)

== Products ==
Nike produces a wide range of sports equipment and apparel.

=== Sports apparel ===
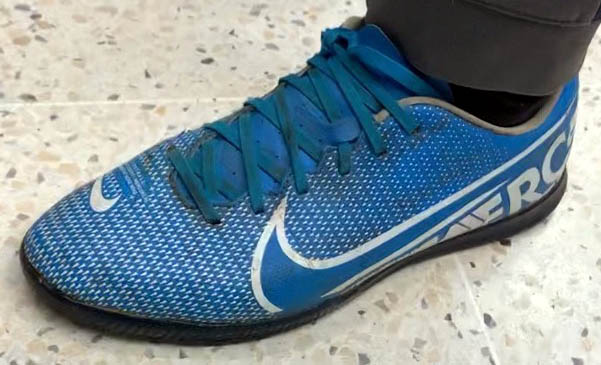
Mercurial astro turf shoes

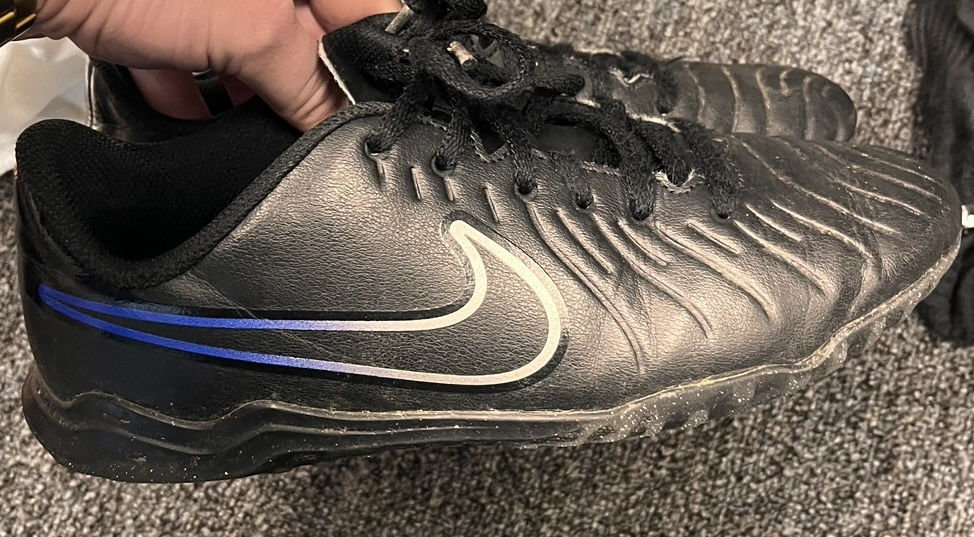
Nike astro turf shoes

Nike's first apparel products were track running shoes. Nike Air Max is a line of shoes first released by Nike, Inc. in 1987. Additional product lines were introduced later, such as Air Huarache, which debuted in 1992. The most recent additions to its line are the Nike 6.0, Nike NYX, and Nike SB shoes, designed for skateboarding. Nike has recently introduced cricket shoes called Air Zoom Yorker, designed to be 30% lighter than its competitors'. In 2008, Nike introduced the Air Jordan XX3, a high-performance basketball shoe designed with the environment in mind.

Nike's range of products include shoes, jerseys, shorts, cleats, baselayers, etc. for sports activities such as soccer, basketball, track and field, combat sports, tennis, American football, athletics, golf, ice hockey, and cross training for men, women, and children. Nike also sells shoes for activities such as skateboarding, baseball, cycling, volleyball, wrestling, cheerleading, lacrosse, cricket, aquatic activities, auto racing, and other athletic and recreational uses. Nike partnered with Apple Inc. to produce the Nike+ product that monitors a runner's performance via a radio device in the shoe that links to the iPod nano. While the product generates useful statistics, it has been criticized by researchers who were able to identify users' RFID devices from 60 feet (18 m) away using small, concealable intelligence motes in a wireless sensor network.

In 2004, Nike launched the SPARQ Training Program/Division. Some of Nike's newest shoes contain Flywire and Lunarlite Foam to reduce weight. The Air Zoom Vomero running shoe, introduced in 2006 and currently in its 11th generation, featured a combination of groundbreaking innovations including a full-length air cushioned sole, an external heel counter, a crashpad in the heel for shock absorption, and Fit Frame technology for a stable fit.

In 2023, Nike told ESPN that it would cease using kangaroo skins in its products by the end of that year and debut "a new Nike-only, proprietary synthetic upper, [with] a new material that is a better performance solution and replaces the use of kangaroo leather."

==== Nike Vaporfly ====
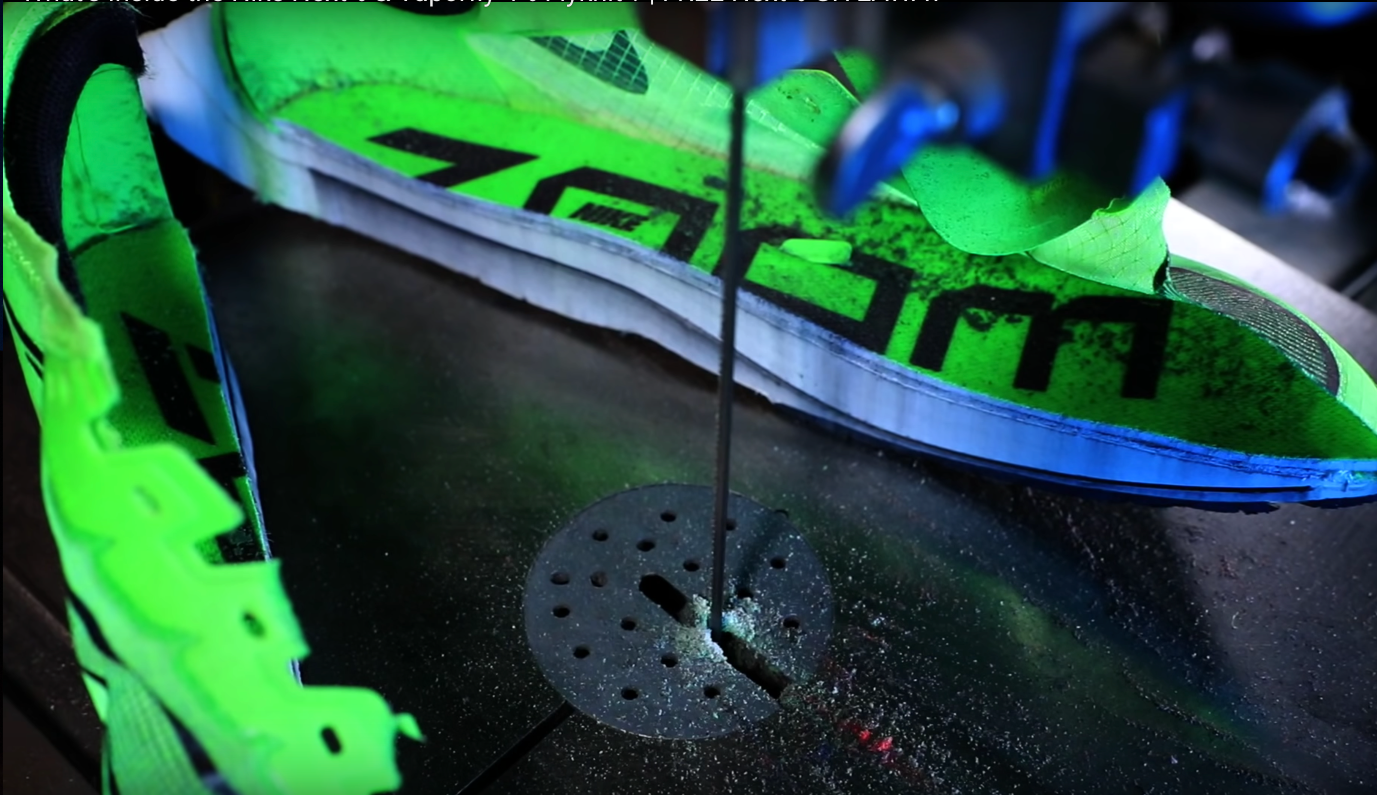
Nike Vaporfly cut in half to show the different layers that make up the base of the shoe. The dark grey line shows the carbon fiber plate.

The Nike Vaporfly first came out in 2017 and their popularity, along with its performance, prompted a new series of running shoes. The Vaporfly series has a new technological composition that has revolutionized long-distance running since studies have shown that these shoes can improve marathon race time up to 4.2%. The composition of the sole contains a foamy material, Pebax, that Nike has altered and now calls it ZoomX (which can be found in other Nike products as well). Pebax foam can also be found in airplane insulation and is "squishier, bouncier, and lighter" than foams in typical running shoes. In the middle of the ZoomX foam there is a full-length carbon fiber plate "designed to generate extra spring in every step". At the time of this writing Nike had just released its newest product from the Vaporfly line, the Nike ZoomX Vaporfly NEXT%, which was marketed as "the fastest shoe we’ve ever made" using Nike's "two most innovative technologies, Nike ZoomX foam and VaporWeave material".

=== Street fashions ===
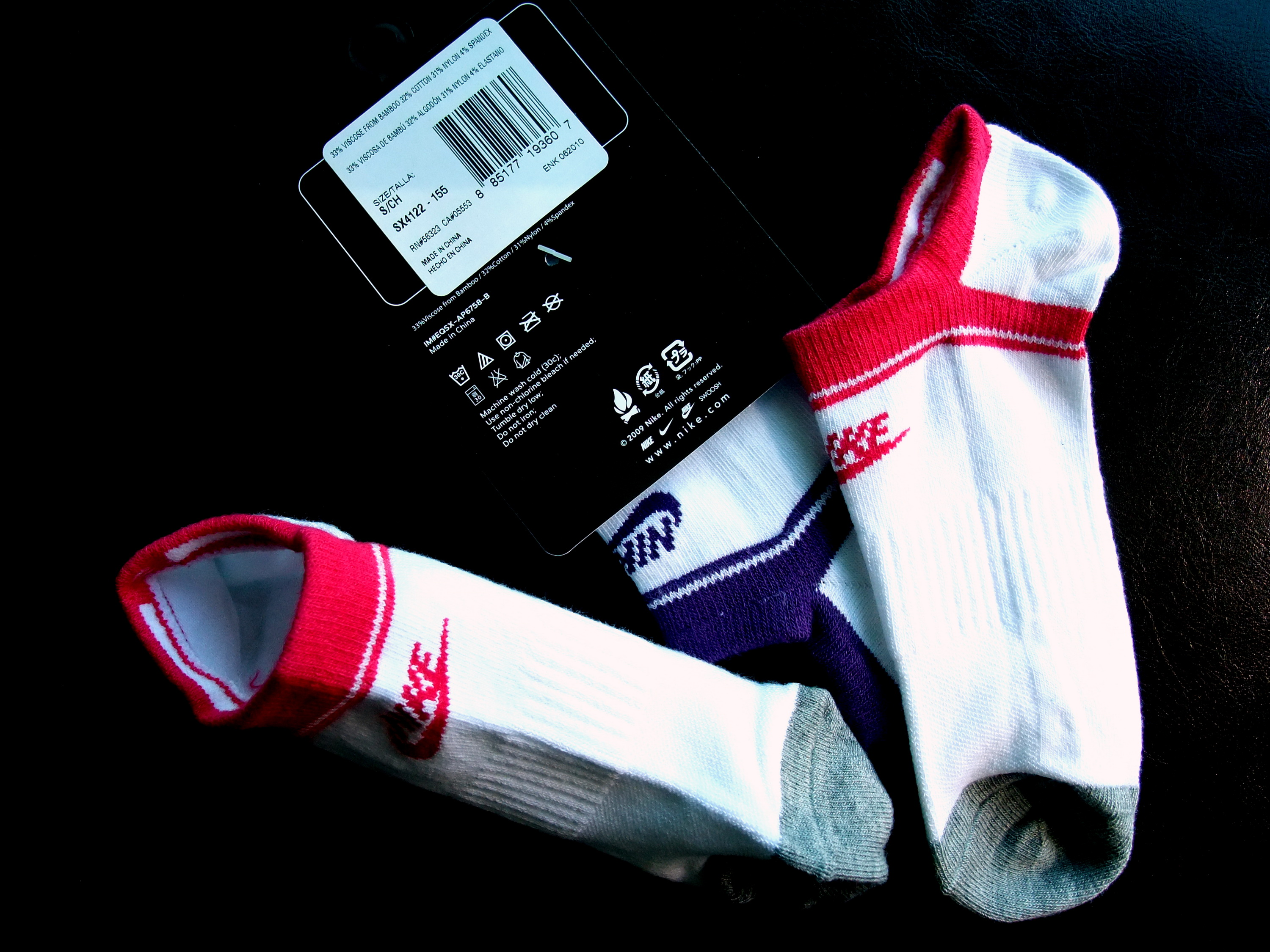
Nike Elite no-show socks with cushioned sole

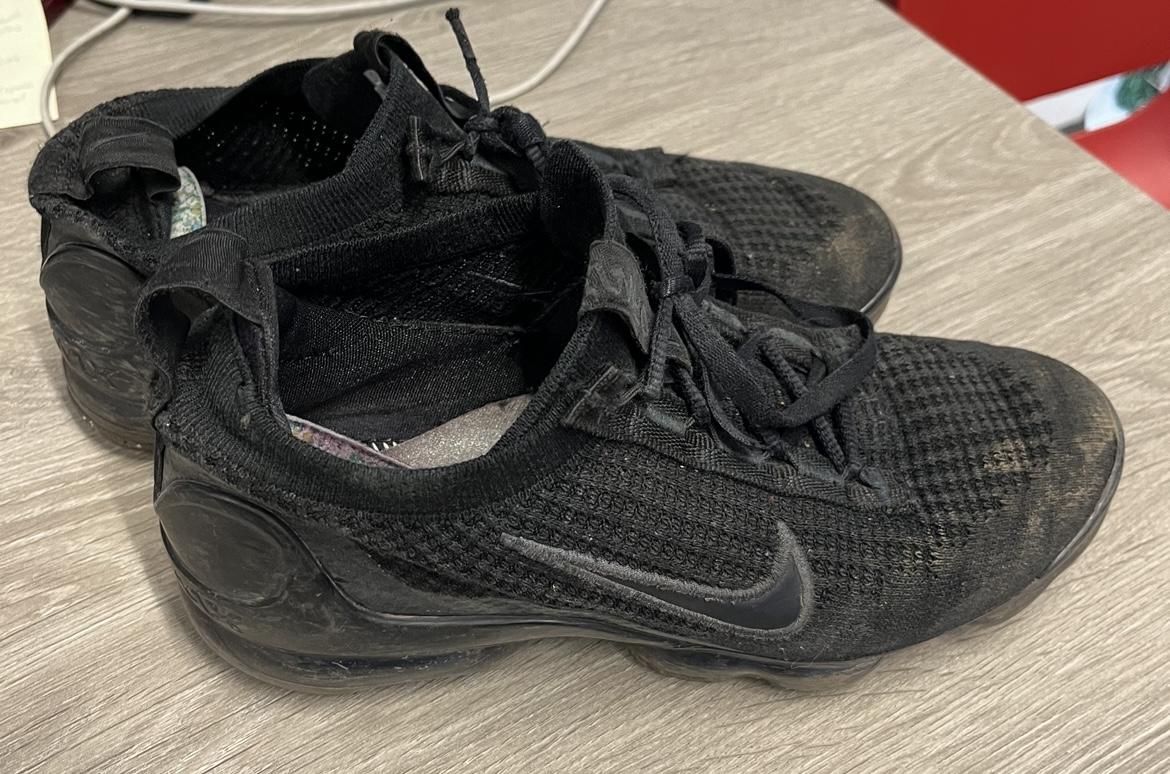
Hypervenom sports shoes

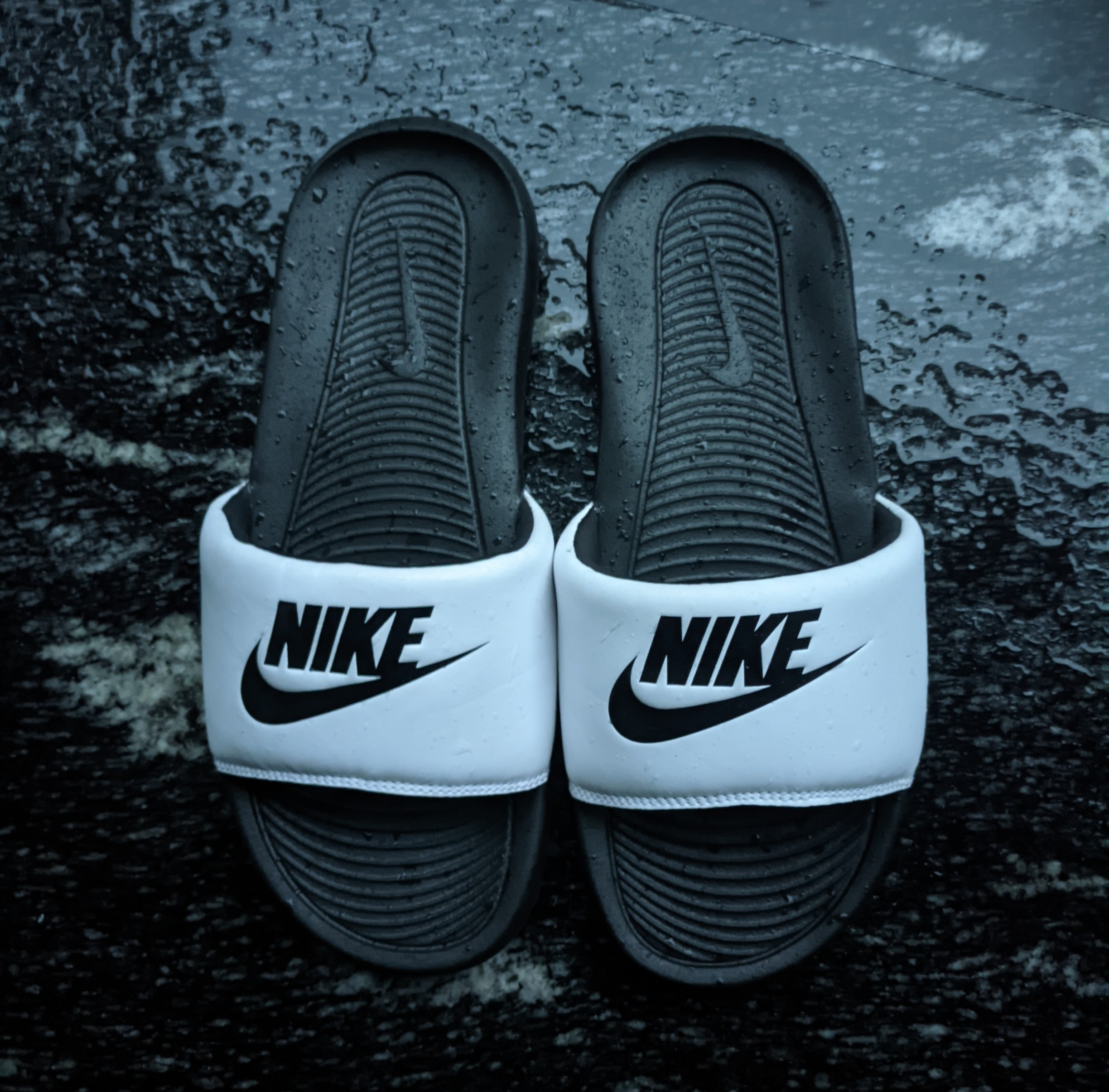
Nike Victori One men's slides on rain

The Nike brand, with its distinctive "Swoosh" logo, quickly became regarded as a status symbol in modern urban fashion and hip-hop fashion due to its association with success in sport. Beginning in the 1980s, various items of Nike clothing became staples of mainstream American youth fashion, especially tracksuits, shell suits, baseball caps, Air Jordans, Air Force 1's, and Air Max running shoes with thick, air cushioned rubber soles and contrasting blue, yellow, green, white, or red trim. Limited edition sneakers and prototypes with a regional early release were known as Quickstrikes, and became highly desirable items for teenage members of the sneakerhead subculture.

By the 1990s and 2000s, American and European teenagers associated with the preppy or popular clique began combining these sneakers, leggings, sweatpants, crop tops, and tracksuits with regular casual chic street clothes such as jeans, skirts, leg warmers, slouch socks, and bomber jackets. Particularly popular were the unisex spandex Nike Tempo compression shorts worn for cycling and running, which had a mesh lining, waterproofing, and, later in the 2000s, a zip pocket for a Walkman or MP3 player.

From the late 2000s into the 2010s, Nike Elite basketball socks began to be worn as everyday clothes by hip-hop fans and young children. Originally plain white or black, these socks had special shock absorbing cushioning in the sole plus a moisture wicking upper weave. Later, Nike Elite socks became available in bright colors inspired by throwback basketball uniforms, often with contrasting bold abstract designs, images of celebrities, and freehand digital print to capitalize upon the emerging nostalgia for 1990s fashion.

In 2015, a new self-lacing shoe was introduced. Called the Nike Mag, which are replicas of the shoes featured in Back to the Future Part II, it had a preliminary limited release, only available by auction with all proceeds going to the Michael J. Fox Foundation. This was done again in 2016.

Nike have introduced a premium line, focused more on streetwear than sports wear called NikeLab.

In March 2017, Nike announced its launch of a plus-size clothing line, which will feature new sizes 1X through 3X on more than 200 products. Another significant development at this time was the Chuck Taylor All-Star Modern, an update of the classic basketball sneaker that incorporated the circular knit upper and cushioned foam sole of Nike's Air Jordans.

=== Collectibles ===
On July 23, 2019, a pair of Nike Inc. running shoes sold for $437,500 at a Sotheby's auction. The so-called "Moon Shoes" were designed by Nike co-founder and track coach Bill Bowerman for runners participating in the 1972 Olympics trials. The buyer was Miles Nadal, a Canadian investor and car collector, who had just paid $850,000 for a group of 99 rare or limited collection pairs of sport shoes. The purchase price was the highest for one pair of sneakers, the previous record being $190,373 in 2017 for a pair of signed Converse shoes in California, said to have been worn by Michael Jordan during the 1984 basketball final of the Olympics that year.

=== Virtual ===
After acquiring RTFKT, Nike launched the Dunk Genesis Cryptokicks collection, which features over 20,000 NFTs. One design by Takashi Murakami was sold for $134,000 in April 2022.

== Marketing strategy ==
Nike promotes its products through sponsorship agreements with celebrity athletes, professional teams and college athletic teams. Nike has endorsement deals with many top sports players such as LeBron James, Kevin Durant, and Serena Williams.

=== Advertising ===
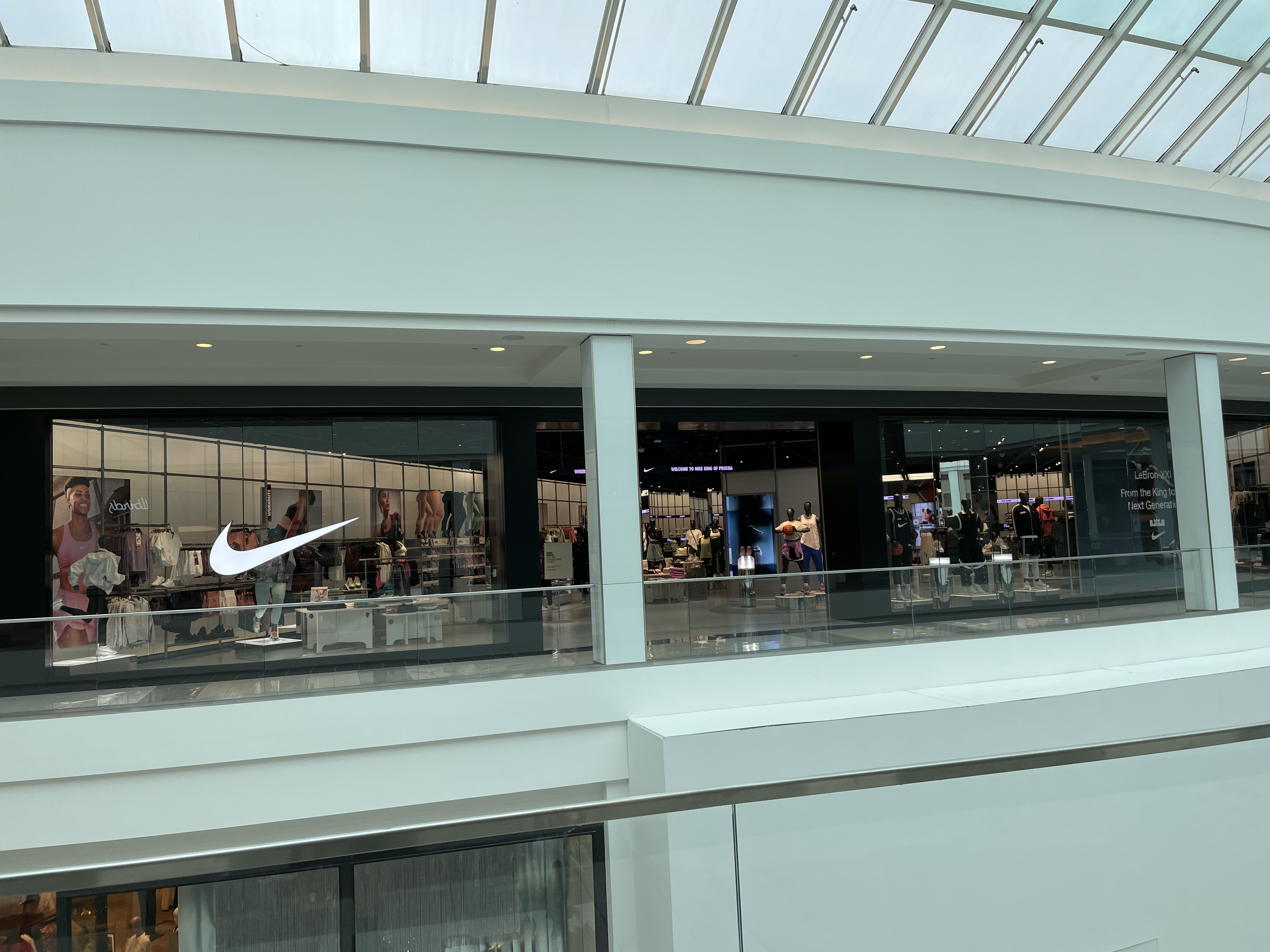
Nike store at the King of Prussia Mall in King of Prussia, Pennsylvania

In 1982, Nike aired its first three national television ads, created by newly formed ad agency Wieden+Kennedy (W+K), during the broadcast of the New York Marathon. The Cannes Advertising Festival has named Nike its Advertiser of the Year in 1994 and 2003, making it the first company to receive that honor twice.

Nike also has earned the Emmy Award for best commercial in 2000 and 2002. The first was for "The Morning After," a satirical look at what a runner might face on the morning of January 1, 2000, if every dire prediction about the Y2K problem came to fruition. The second was for a 2002 spot called "Move," which featured a series of famous and everyday athletes in a variety of athletic pursuits.

==== Beatles song ====
Nike was criticized for its use of the Beatles song "Revolution" in a 1987 commercial against the wishes of Apple Records, the Beatles' recording company. Nike paid US$250,000 to Capitol Records Inc., which held the North American licensing rights to the recordings, for the right to use the Beatles' rendition for a year.

That same year, Apple Records sued Nike Inc., Capitol Records Inc., EMI Records Inc. and Wieden+Kennedy for $15 million. Capitol-EMI countered by saying the lawsuit was "groundless" because Capitol had licensed the use of "Revolution" with the "active support and encouragement of Yoko Ono, a shareholder and director of Apple Records."

Nike discontinued airing ads featuring "Revolution" in March 1988. Yoko Ono later gave permission to Nike to use John Lennon's "Instant Karma" in another advertisement.

==== New media marketing ====
Nike was an early adopter of internet marketing, email management technologies, and using broadcast and narrowcast communication technologies to create multimedia marketing campaigns.

==== Minor Threat advertisement ====
In late June 2005, Nike received criticism from Ian MacKaye, owner of Dischord Records, guitarist/vocalist for Fugazi and The Evens, and front man of the defunct punk band Minor Threat, for appropriating imagery and text from Minor Threat's 1981 self-titled album's cover art in a flyer promoting Nike Skateboarding's 2005 East Coast demo tour.

On June 27, Nike Skateboarding's website issued an apology to Dischord, Minor Threat, and fans of both and announced that it has tried to remove and dispose of all flyers. They stated that the people who designed it were skateboarders and Minor Threat fans themselves who created the advertisement out of respect and appreciation for the band. The dispute was eventually settled out of court between Nike and Minor Threat.

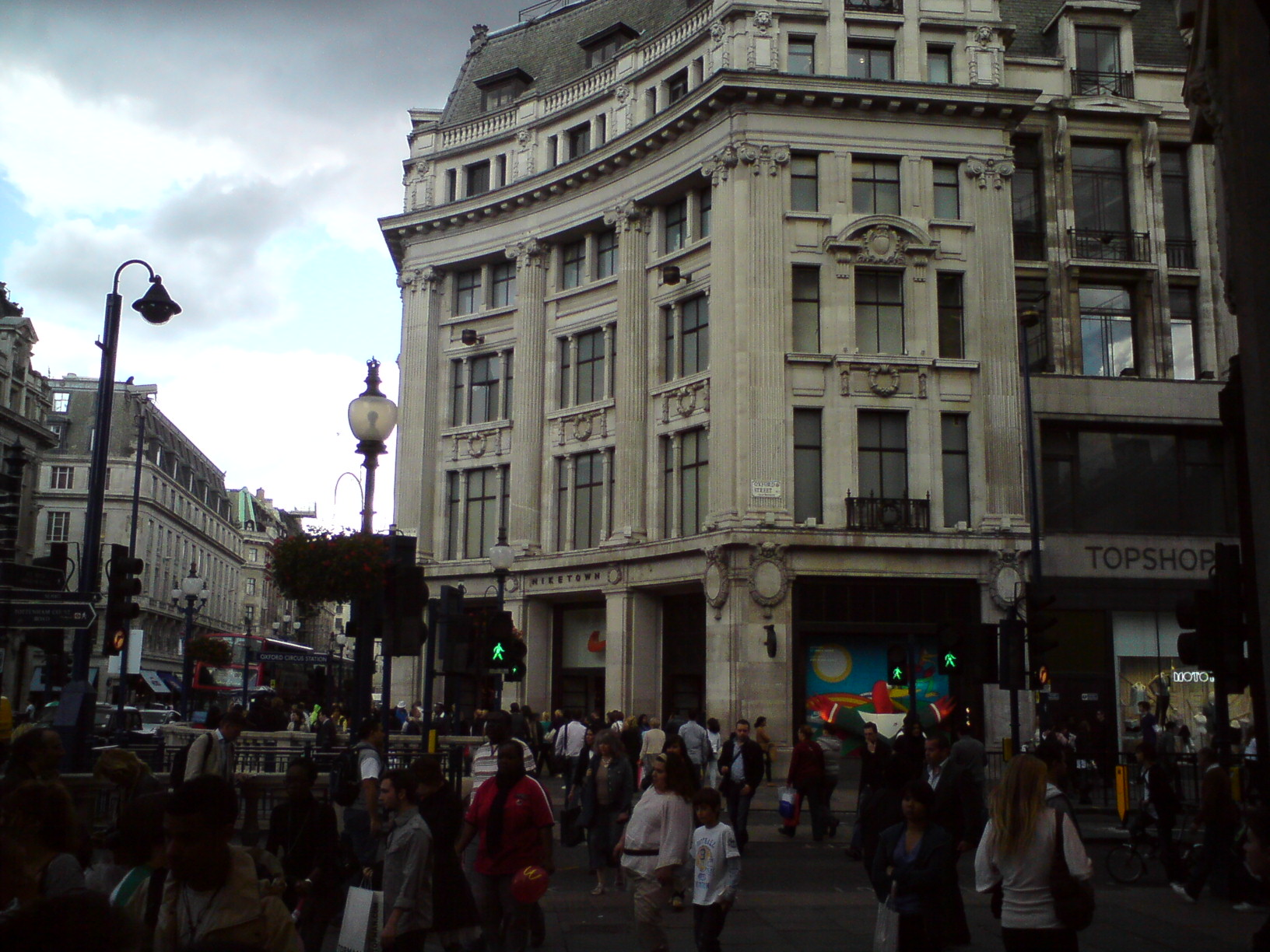
Niketown at Oxford Circus, London

==== Nike 6.0 ====
As part of the 6.0 campaign, Nike introduced a new line of T-shirts that include phrases such as "Dope", "Get High" and "Ride Pipe" – sports lingo that is also a double entendre for drug use. Boston Mayor Thomas Menino expressed his objection to the shirts after seeing them in a window display at the city's Niketown and asked the store to remove the display. "What we don't need is a major corporation like Nike, which tries to appeal to the younger generation, out there giving credence to the drug issue," Menino told The Boston Herald. A company official stated the shirts were meant to pay homage to extreme sports, and that Nike does not condone the illegal use of drugs. Nike was forced to replace the shirt line.

=== NBA uniform deal ===
In June 2015, Nike signed an 8-year deal with the NBA to become the official uniform supplier for the league, beginning with the 2017–18 season. The brand took over for Adidas, who provided the uniforms for the league since 2006. Unlike previous deals, Nike's logo appear on NBA jerseys – a first for the league. Initially, the Charlotte Hornets, owned by longtime Nike endorser Michael Jordan, were the only team not to sport the Nike swoosh, instead wearing the Jumpman logo associated with Jordan-related merchandise. However, beginning with the 2020–21 season, the Jumpman replaced the swoosh on the NBA's alternate "Statement" uniforms. In October 2024, Nike announced a 12-year global extension of the partnership, retaining exclusive rights to design and manufacture uniforms for the NBA, WNBA and NBA G League through 2037.

== Sponsorship ==
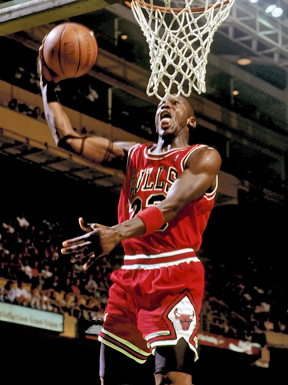
Michael Jordan (pictured in 1987) helped drive Nike sales.

Nike sponsors top athletes in many sports to use its products and promote and advertise its technology and design. Nike's first professional athlete endorser was Romanian tennis player Ilie Năstase. The first track endorser was distance runner Steve Prefontaine. Prefontaine was the prized pupil of the company's co-founder, Bill Bowerman, while he coached at the University of Oregon. Today, the Steve Prefontaine Building is named in his honor at Nike's corporate headquarters. Nike has only made one statue of its sponsored athletes and it is of Steve Prefontaine.

Nike has also sponsored many other successful track and field athletes over the years, such as Sebastian Coe, Carl Lewis, Jackie Joyner-Kersee, Michael Johnson and Allyson Felix. The signing of basketball player Michael Jordan in 1984, with his subsequent promotion of Nike over the course of his career, with Spike Lee as Mars Blackmon, proved to be one of the biggest boosts to Nike's publicity and sales.

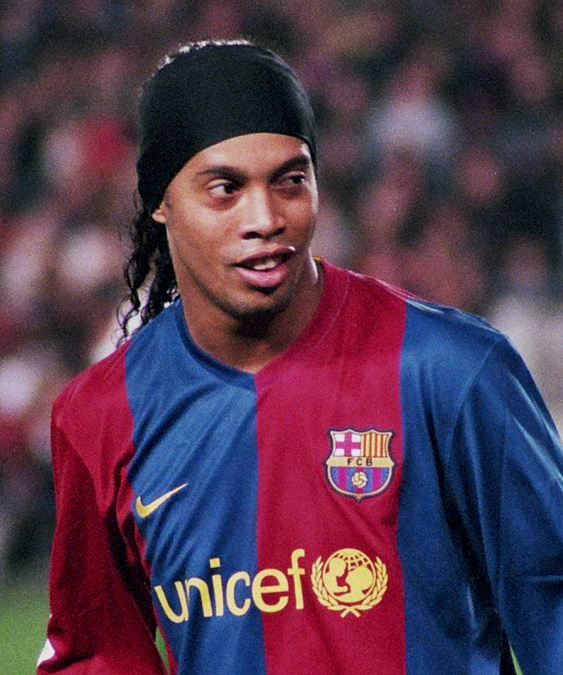
Ronaldinho (pictured with Barcelona in 2007) appeared in a 2005 Nike advertisement that went viral on YouTube, becoming the site's first video to reach one million views.

Nike is a major sponsor of the athletic programs at Penn State University and named its first child care facility after Joe Paterno when it opened in 1990 at the company's headquarters. Nike originally announced it would not remove Paterno's name from the building in the wake of the Penn State sex abuse scandal. After the Freeh Report was released on July 12, 2012, Nike CEO Mark Parker announced the name Joe Paterno would be removed immediately from the child development center. A new name has yet to be announced.

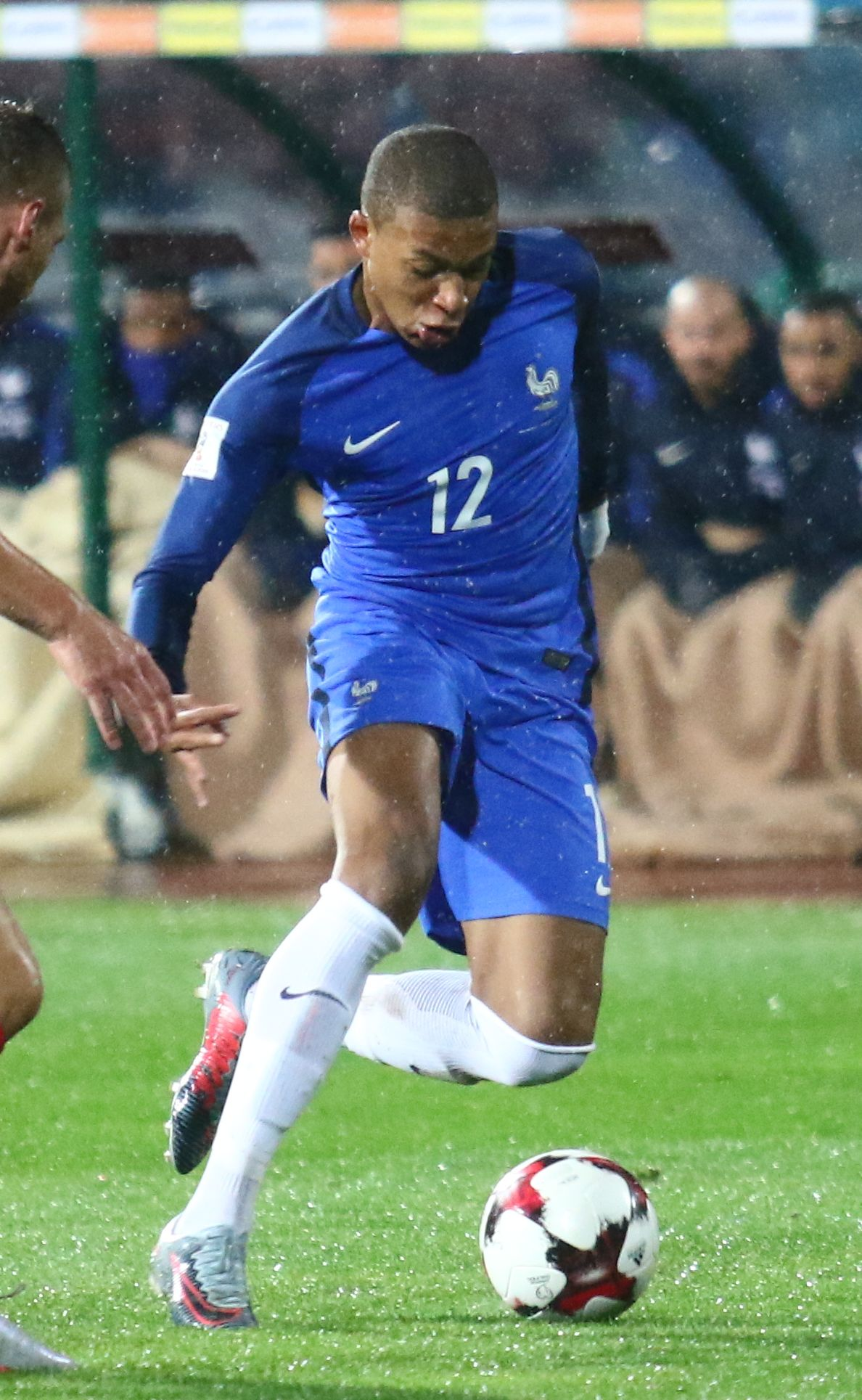
Nike Hypervenom 3 boots were commissioned for French prodigy Kylian Mbappé.

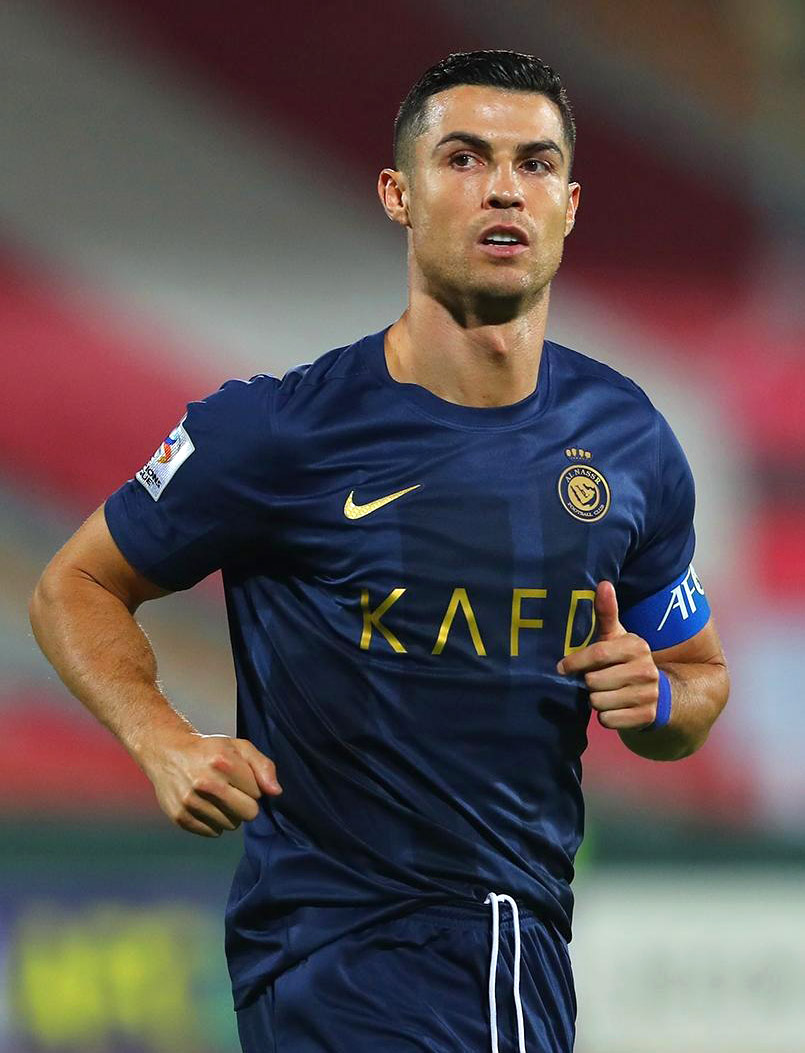
Cristiano Ronaldo

In 1982, prolific Liverpool striker Ian Rush became the first footballer to sign a sponsorship deal with Nike. In the early 1990s, Nike made endorsement deals with famous players such as Romário, be Eric Cantona and Edgar Davids. A Barcelona prodigy, Lionel Messi had been signed with Nike since age 14, but transferred to Adidas after they successfully challenged their rival's claim to his image rights in court. They continued the growth in the sport by signing more top players including: Ronaldo, Ronaldinho, Francesco Totti, Thierry Henry, Didier Drogba, Andrés Iniesta, Wayne Rooney, Zlatan Ibrahimović, Neymar, Kylian Mbappé and Harry Kane.

In 2026, Nike still have many of the sport's biggest stars under its name, with Cristiano Ronaldo, Erling Haaland, Vinícius Júnior, Virgil van Dijk, Robert Lewandowski, Bruno Fernandes, Cole Palmer, Marcus Rashford, and Jamal Musiala among others.

Nike has been the official ball supplier for the Premier League since the 2000–01 season. In 2012, Nike carried a commercial partnership with the Asian Football Confederation. In August 2014, Nike announced that it will not renew its kit supply deal with Manchester United after the 2014–15 season, citing rising costs. Since the start of the 2015–16 season, Adidas has manufactured Manchester United's kit as part of a world-record 10-year deal worth a minimum of £750 million.

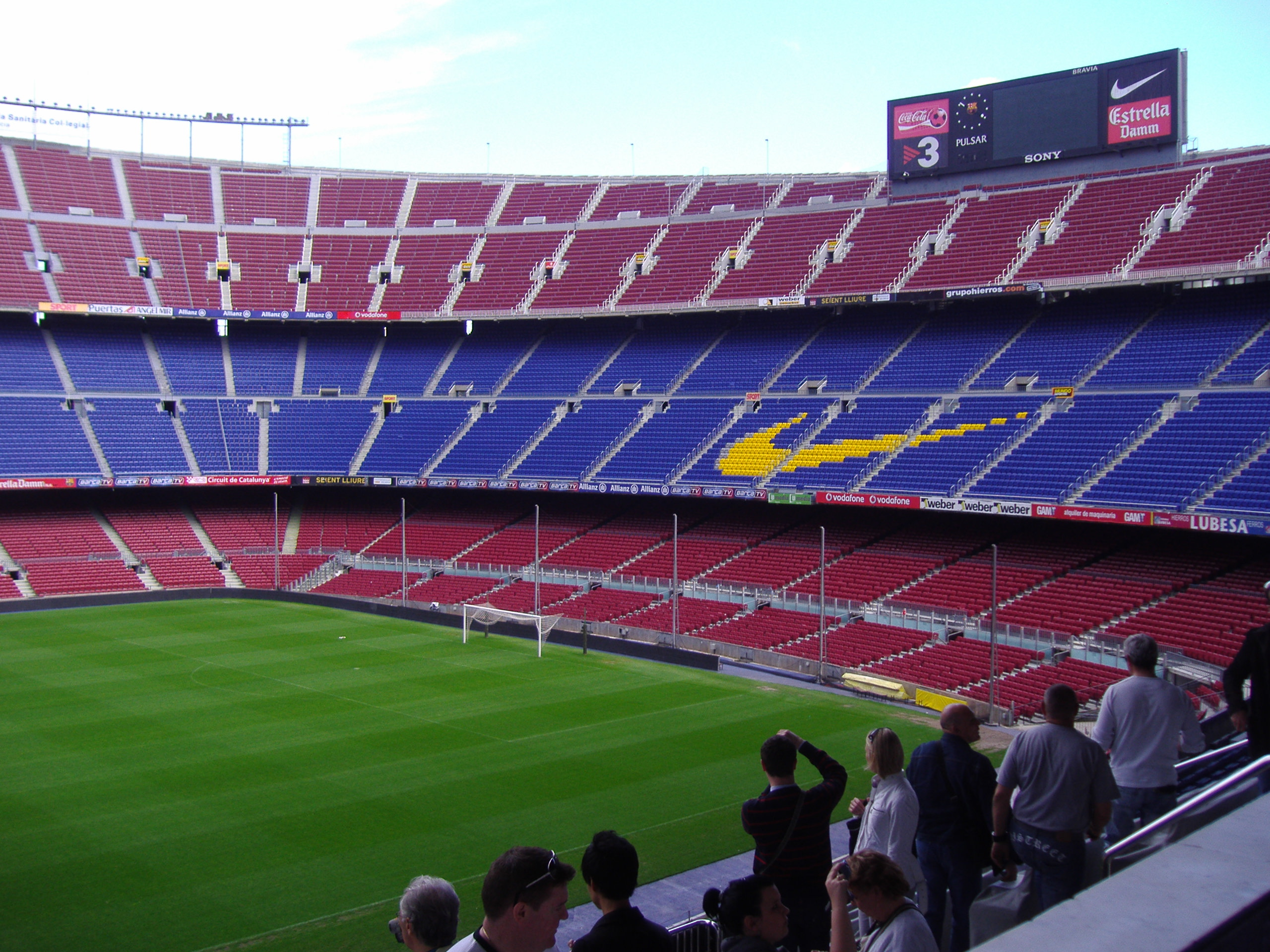
Nike logo in the Camp Nou, the home stadium of Barcelona

Nike still has many of the top teams playing in their uniforms, including: FC Barcelona, Atlético Madrid, Chelsea, Tottenham Hotspur, Inter Milan, Paris Saint-Germain, Sporting CP, Corinthians, Beşiktaş JK. The national teams of United States, Brazil, England, France, Netherlands, Norway, Croatia, Finland, Poland, Slovenia, Canada. Uruguay, Nigeria and Australia among many others also use Nike.

Nike has been the sponsor for many top ranked tennis players. Brand's commercial success in the sport went hand in hand with the endorsement deals signed with the biggest and the world's most charismatic stars and number one ranked players of the subsequent eras, including John McEnroe in the 1980s, Andre Agassi and Pete Sampras in the 1990s and Roger Federer, Rafael Nadal, Serena Williams, Maria Sharapova, Victoria Azarenka, Aryna Sabalenka, Carlos Alcaraz, Jannik Sinner, Naomi Osaka with the start of the 21st century.

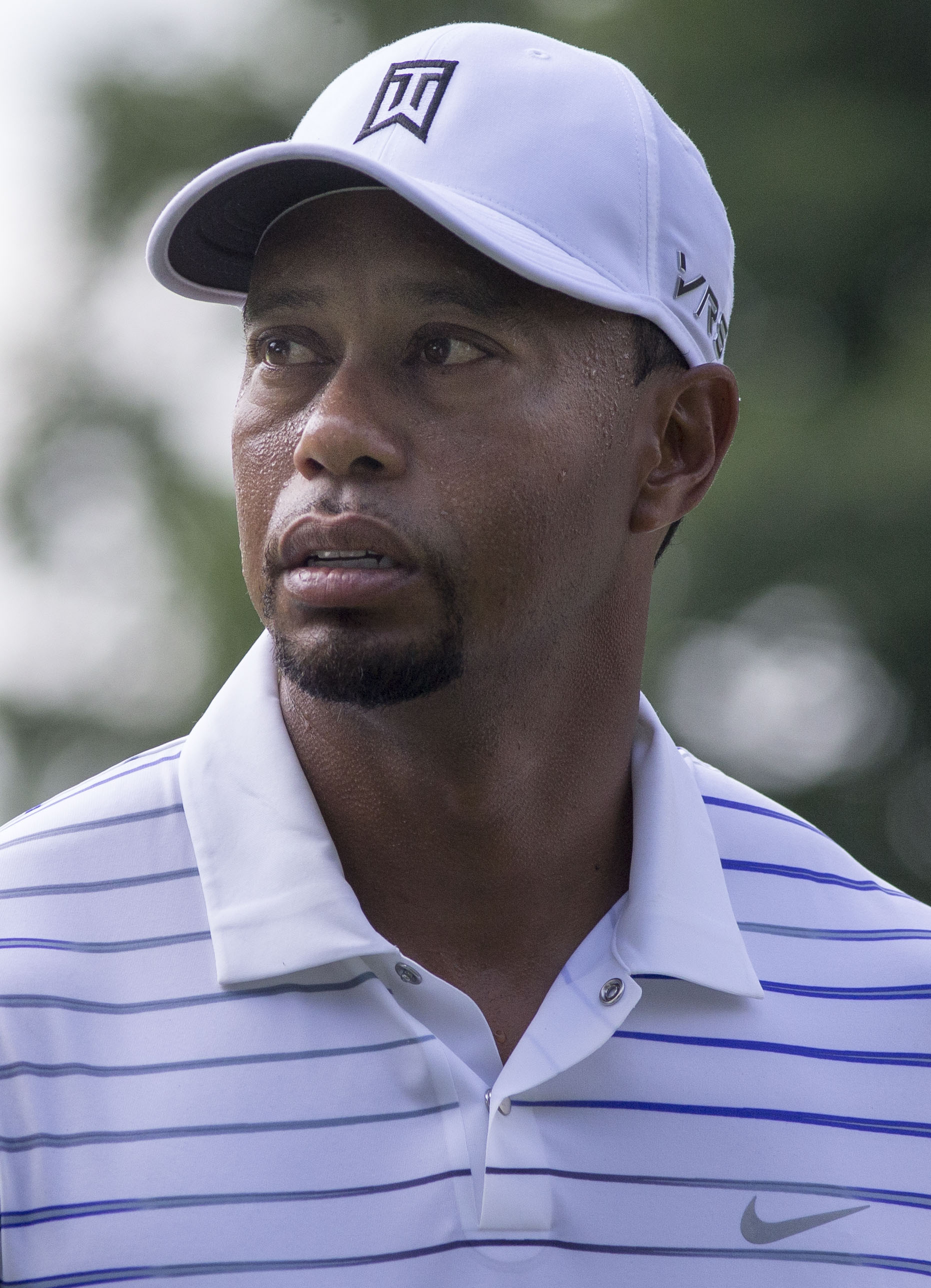
Tiger Woods

Nike sponsored Tiger Woods until 2024, and remained on his side amid the controversies that shaped the golfer's career. In January 2013, Nike signed Rory McIlroy, the then No 1 golfer in the world to a 10-year sponsorship deal worth $250 million. Nike has also gone on to sign top players in golf including Scottie Scheffler, Brooks Koepka, Nelly Korda, Tommy Fleetwood, Tony Finau and Cam Davis. Nike's 2016 decision to exit the golf equipment business–such as club manufacturing–due to an 8.2% decline sales in one year meant sponsored athletes exclusively wore Nike apparel.

Nike was the official kit sponsor for the Indian cricket team from 2005 to 2020. On February 21, 2013, Nike announced it suspended its contract with South African limbless athlete Oscar Pistorius, due to him being charged with premeditated murder.

Nike consolidated its position in basketball in 2015 when it was announced that the company would sign an 8-year deal with the NBA, taking over from the league's previous uniform sponsor, Adidas. The deal required all franchise team members to wear jerseys and shorts with the Swoosh logo, beginning with the 2017/18 season. After the success of partnership with Jordan, which resulted in the creation of the unique Air Jordan brand, Nike has continued to build partnership with the biggest names in basketball. LeBron James was given the Slogan "We are All Witnesses" when he signed with Nike. Similar to "Air Jordan", James' brand became massively popular. Some have had signature shoes designed for them, including Kobe Bryant, Jason Kidd, Vince Carter and more recently, James and Kevin Durant, Giannis Antetokounmpo, Jayson Tatum, Paul George and Luka Dončić, among others.

In Australia, Nike is the on-and-off-field apparel supplier of two clubs in the Australian Football League (AFL) and AFL Women's: Collingwood and the Sydney Swans. It has also previously supplied the on and off field apparel for the Carlton Football Club between 1998–2019, and the Port Adelaide Football Club between 1997 and 2006.

Nike recently made signature shoes for WNBA stars as well, as the league's popularity takes off. Although a dozen women have received signature sneakers in the WNBA's 27-year history, it had been over a decade since a woman had received a signature sneaker. Nike's first signature shoe in the WNBA was with Sheryl Swoops, and since then it has made signature silhouettes for Lisa Leslie, Dawn Staley, Cynthia Cooper, and most recently for Sabrina Ionescu. Caitlin Clark will also receive a signature shoe deal as part of her eight-year, 28 million dollar deal.

A news report originating from CNN reported that Nike spent $11.5 billion, nearly a third of its sales, on marketing and endorsement contracts in the year 2018. Nike and its Jordan brand sponsored 85 men's and women's basketball teams in the NCAA tournament.

== Ties with the University of Oregon ==
Nike maintains strong ties, both directly and through partnerships with Phil Knight, with the University of Oregon. Nike designs the University of Oregon football program's team attire. New unique combinations are issued before every game day. Tinker Hatfield, who also redesigned the university's logo, leads this effort.

More recently, the corporation donated $13.5 million towards the renovation and expansion of Hayward Field.

Phil Knight has invested substantial personal funds towards developing and maintaining the university's athletic apparatus. His university projects often involve input from Nike designers and executives, such as Tinker Hatfield.

== Causes ==
In 2012, Nike is listed as a partner of the (PRODUCT)^{RED} campaign together with other brands such as Girl, American Express, and Converse. The campaign's mission is to prevent the transmission of HIV from mother to child. The campaign's byline is "Fighting For An AIDS Free Generation". The company's goal is to raise and send funds, for education and medical assistance to those who live in areas heavily affected by AIDS. In 2023, Nike became the presenting sponsor of Reviving Baseball in Inner Cities, which encourages youth in underserved communities to participate in baseball and softball.

== Nike Community Ambassador Program ==
The Nike Community Ambassador Program, allows Nike employees from around the world to go out and give to their community. Over 3,900 employees from various Nike stores have participated in teaching children to be active and healthy.

== Research ==
In 2016, a study done by RTG Consulting Group reflected that Nike was the 3rd most relevant brand for Gen-Z in China.

Roth MKM's 2023 Millennial survey reported in March that millennials with health and wellness concerns in the aftermath of the pandemic ranked brands like Nike, Adidas and Lululemon as their preferred brands for purchases.

In January 2023, a study by Rakuten concluded that Nike was the most popular sportswear brand in the US, followed by Lululemon and Adidas.

In July 2023, a study by Kantar found that Americans consider Nike as the Most Inclusive Brands (alongside other top brands like Amazon, and Disney).

== Environmental record ==
In 2007, New England–based environmental organization Clean Air-Cool Planet ranked Nike among the top three companies (out of 56) in a survey of climate-friendly companies.

=== Recycling ===
Nike has also been praised for its Nike Grind program, which closes the product lifecycle, by groups such as Climate Counts.

Since 1993, Nike has worked on its Reuse-A-Shoe program. This program is Nike's longest-running program that benefits both the environment and the community by collecting old athletic shoes of any type in order to process and recycle them. The material that is produced is then used to help create sports surfaces such as basketball courts, running tracks, and playgrounds. Nike France made their Reuse-A-Shoe program available online so that they could make it easier for consumers to send in their old shoes. In 2017, it was estimated that 28,000,000 shoes were collected since its start in 1993. Nike limited the mail-in option of the program because it is aware that the emissions from shipping would offset the good, it is trying to do. They work with the National Recycling Coalition to help limit transportation of recycled shoes. During transportation most of the vehicles that are used are using diesel or fuel oil. Diesel oil emits 22.44 pounds of Carbon Dioxide per gallon.

A campaign that Nike began for Earth Day 2008 was a commercial that featured basketball star Steve Nash wearing Nike's Trash Talk Shoe, which had been constructed in February 2008 from pieces of leather and synthetic leather waste from factory floors. The Trash Talk Shoe also featured a sole composed of ground-up rubber from a shoe recycling program. Nike claims this is the first performance basketball shoe that has been created from manufacturing waste, but it only produced 5,000 pairs for sale.

=== Sulfur hexafluoride ===
Sulfur hexafluoride is an extremely potent and persistent greenhouse gas that was used to fill the cushion bags in all "Air"-branded shoes from 1992 to 2006. 277 tons was used during the peak in 1997.

=== Toxic chemicals ===
In 2008, a project through the University of North Carolina at Chapel Hill found workers were exposed to toxic isocyanates and other chemicals in footwear factories in Thailand. In addition to inhalation, dermal exposure was the biggest problem found. This could result in allergic reactions including asthmatic reactions.

=== Water pollution ===
In July 2011, environmental group Greenpeace published a report regarding water pollution impacting the Yangtze River emitted from a major textile factory operated by Nike supplier Youngor Group. Following the report, Nike, as well as Adidas, Puma, and a number of other brands included in the report announced an agreement to stop discharging hazardous chemicals by 2020. However, in July 2016 Greenpeace released a follow-up report which found that Nike "does not take individual responsibility" for eliminating hazardous chemicals, stating that Nike had not made an explicit commitment to riding itself of perfluorinated compounds, and that "Nike does not ensure its suppliers report their hazardous chemical discharge data and has not made a commitment to do so".

Back in 2016, Nike started to use water free dyeing materials so that they can help reduce their water use in their Southeast Asian factories.

=== Carbon footprint ===
Nike reported Total CO_{2}e emissions (Direct + Indirect) for the twelve months ending June 30, 2020 at 317 Kt (+12/+4% y-o-y) and plans to reduce emissions 65% by 2030 from a 2015 base year. This science-based target is aligned with Paris Agreement to limit global warming to 1.5 °C above pre-industrial levels. According to a study done in 2017, Nike contributed 3,002,529 metric tons of Carbon Dioxide in 2017 combined from different sectors in the company like retail, manufacturing, management, and more.

Nike's annual Total CO_{2}e Emissions – Location-Based Scope 1 + Scope 2 (in kilotonnes)
Jun 2015	Jun 2016	Jun 2017	Jun 2018	Jun 2019	Jun 2020
286	300	327	301	305	317

While emissions of Nike's two corporate jets represent less than 0.1% of its total emissions, they have increased by 20% from 2015 to 2023.

Partnership with Newlight

In 2021, Nike announced it was working with Newlight Technologies to find more eco-friendly materials for its sneakers. They specifically mentioned Newlight's AirCarbon product which is a bioplastic that can be used to make shoes. The bioplastic is used as a replacement to leather, plastic, and other materials that are like that. Newlight was reported saying that the goal is to reduce Nike's carbon footprint.

=== Sustainability ===
Nike has taken steps to reduce its environmental impact. It has worked to reduce carbon emissions nearly 3% across its value chain from its FY11 baseline, and sourced from fewer, higher-performing contract factories.

In 2019, Nike began a program called "Move to Zero" in an effort to achieve zero waste and zero carbon in the organization's supply chain and product lifetime. The men's and women's sections of the collection contain at least 60% organic and recycled materials, including sustainably sourced cotton.

== Controversies ==
Nike has contracted with more than 700 shops around the world and has offices located in 45 countries outside the United States. Most of the factories are located in Asia, including Indonesia, China, Taiwan, India, Thailand, Vietnam, Pakistan, Philippines, and Malaysia. Nike is hesitant to disclose information about the contract companies it works with. However, due to harsh criticism from some organizations like CorpWatch, Nike has disclosed information about its contract factories in its Corporate Governance Report.

=== Sweatshops ===
In the 1990s, Nike received criticism for its use of sweatshops. Beginning in 1990, many protests occurred in big cities such as Los Angeles, Washington, DC and Boston in order to show public outcry for Nike's use of child labor and sweatshops. Nike has been criticized for contracting with factories (known as Nike sweatshops) in countries such as China, Vietnam, Indonesia and Mexico. Vietnam Labor Watch, an activist group, has documented that factories contracted by Nike have violated minimum wage and overtime laws in Vietnam as late as 1996, although Nike claims that this practice has been stopped.

As of July 2011, Nike stated that two-thirds of its factories producing Converse products still do not meet the company's standards for worker treatment. A July 2011 Associated Press article stated that employees at the company's plants in Indonesia reported constant abuse from supervisors.

=== Child labor ===
During the 1990s, Nike faced criticism for the use of child labor in Cambodia and Pakistan in factories it contracted to manufacture soccer balls. Although Nike took action to curb or at least reduce the practice, it continues to contract its production to companies that operate in areas where inadequate regulation and monitoring make it hard to ensure that child labor is not being used.

In 2001, a BBC documentary uncovered occurrences of child labor and poor working conditions in a Cambodian factory used by Nike. The documentary focused on six girls, who all worked seven days a week, often 16 hours a day.

=== Strike in China factory ===
In April 2014, one of the biggest strikes in mainland China took place at the Yue Yuen Industrial Holdings Dongguan shoe factory, producing amongst others for Nike. Yue Yuen did underpay an employee by 250 yuan (40.82 US Dollars) per month. The average salary at Yue Yuen is 3000 yuan per month. The factory employs 70,000 people. This practice was in place for nearly 20 years.

=== Paradise Papers ===
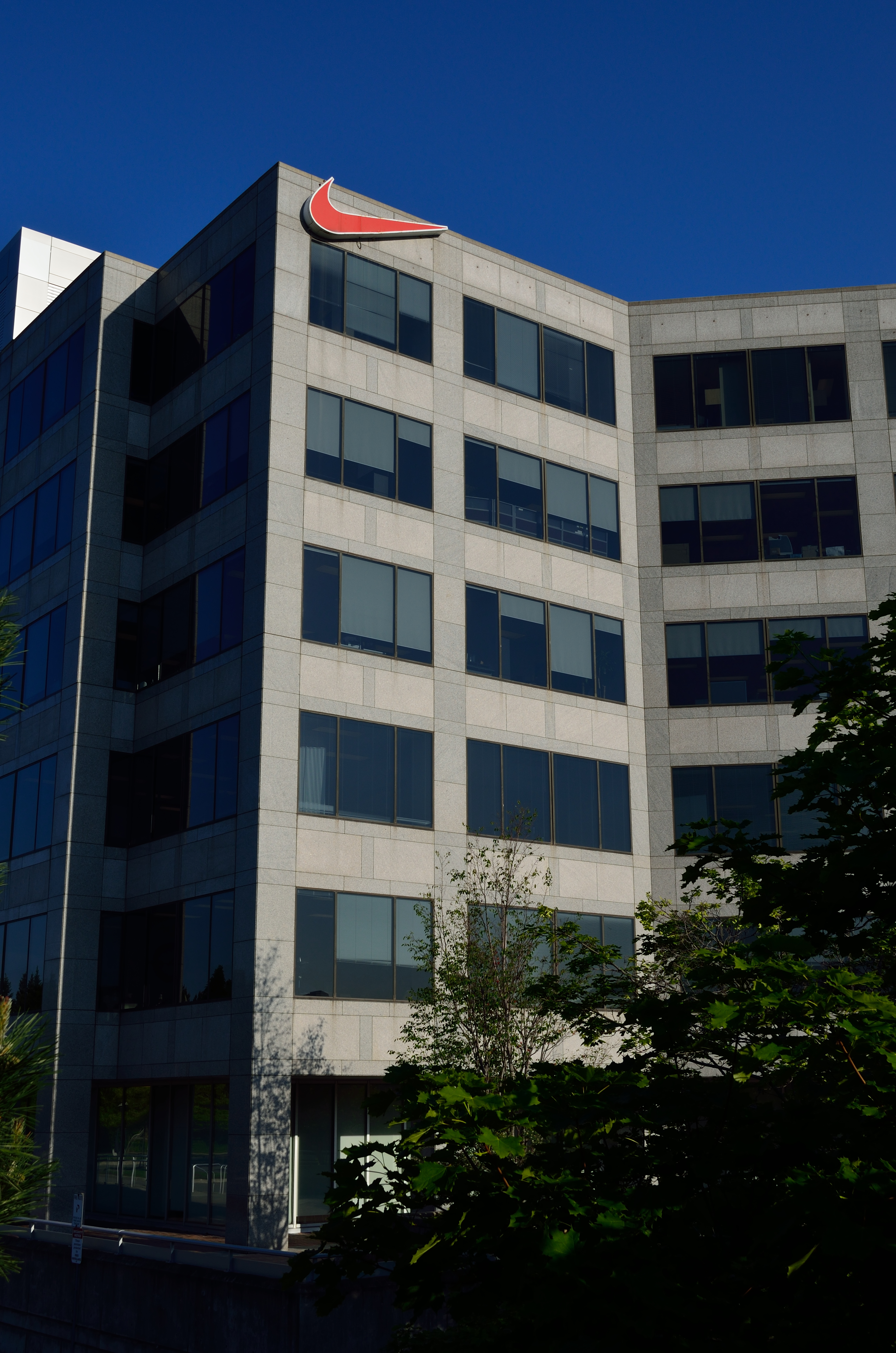
Nike office in North America

On November 5, 2017, the Paradise Papers, a set of confidential electronic documents relating to offshore investment, revealed that Nike is among the corporations that used offshore companies to avoid taxes.

Appleby documents detail how Nike boosted its after-tax profits by, among other maneuvers, transferring ownership of its Swoosh trademark to a Bermudan subsidiary, Nike International Ltd. This transfer allowed the subsidiary to charge royalties to its European headquarters in Hilversum, Netherlands, effectively converting taxable company profits to an account payable in tax-free Bermuda. Although the subsidiary was effectively run by executives at Nike's main offices in Beaverton, Oregon—to the point where a duplicate of the Bermudan company's seal was needed—for tax purposes the subsidiary was treated as Bermuda. Its profits were not declared in Europe and came to light only because of a mostly unrelated case in US Tax Court, where papers filed by Nike briefly mention royalties in 2010, 2011 and 2012 totaling $3.86 billion. Under an arrangement with Dutch authorities, the tax break was to expire in 2014, so another reorganization transferred the intellectual property from the Bermudan company to a Dutch commanditaire vennootschap or limited partnership, Nike Innovate CV. Dutch law treats income earned by a CV as if it had been earned by the principals, who owe no tax in the Netherlands if they do not reside there.

=== Colin Kaepernick ===
In September 2018, Nike announced it had signed former American football quarterback Colin Kaepernick, noted for his controversial decision to kneel during the playing of the US national anthem, to a long-term advertising campaign. According to Charles Robinson of Yahoo! Sports, Kaepernick and Nike agreed to a new contract despite the fact Kaepernick has been with the company since 2011 and said that "interest from other shoe companies" played a part in the new agreement. Robinson said the contract is a "wide endorsement" where Kaepernick will have his own branded line including shoes, shirts, jerseys and more. In response, some people set fire to their own Nike-branded clothes and shoes or cut the Nike swoosh logo out of their clothes, and the Fraternal Order of Police called the advertisement an "insult"; others, such as LeBron James, Serena Williams, and the National Black Police Association, praised Nike for its campaign. The College of the Ozarks removed Nike from all their athletic uniforms in response.

During the following week, Nike's stock price fell 2.2%, even as online orders of Nike products rose 27% compared with the previous year. In the following three months, Nike reported a rise in sales.

In July 2019, Nike released a shoe featuring a Betsy Ross flag called the Air Max 1 Quick Strike Fourth of July trainers. The trainers were designed to celebrate Independence Day. The model was subsequently withdrawn after Colin Kaepernick told the brand he and others found the flag offensive because of its association with slavery.

Nike's decision to withdraw the product drew criticism from Arizona's Republican Governor, Doug Ducey, and Texas's Republican Senator Ted Cruz. Nike's decision was praised by others due to the use of the flag by white nationalists.

=== Hong Kong protests ===
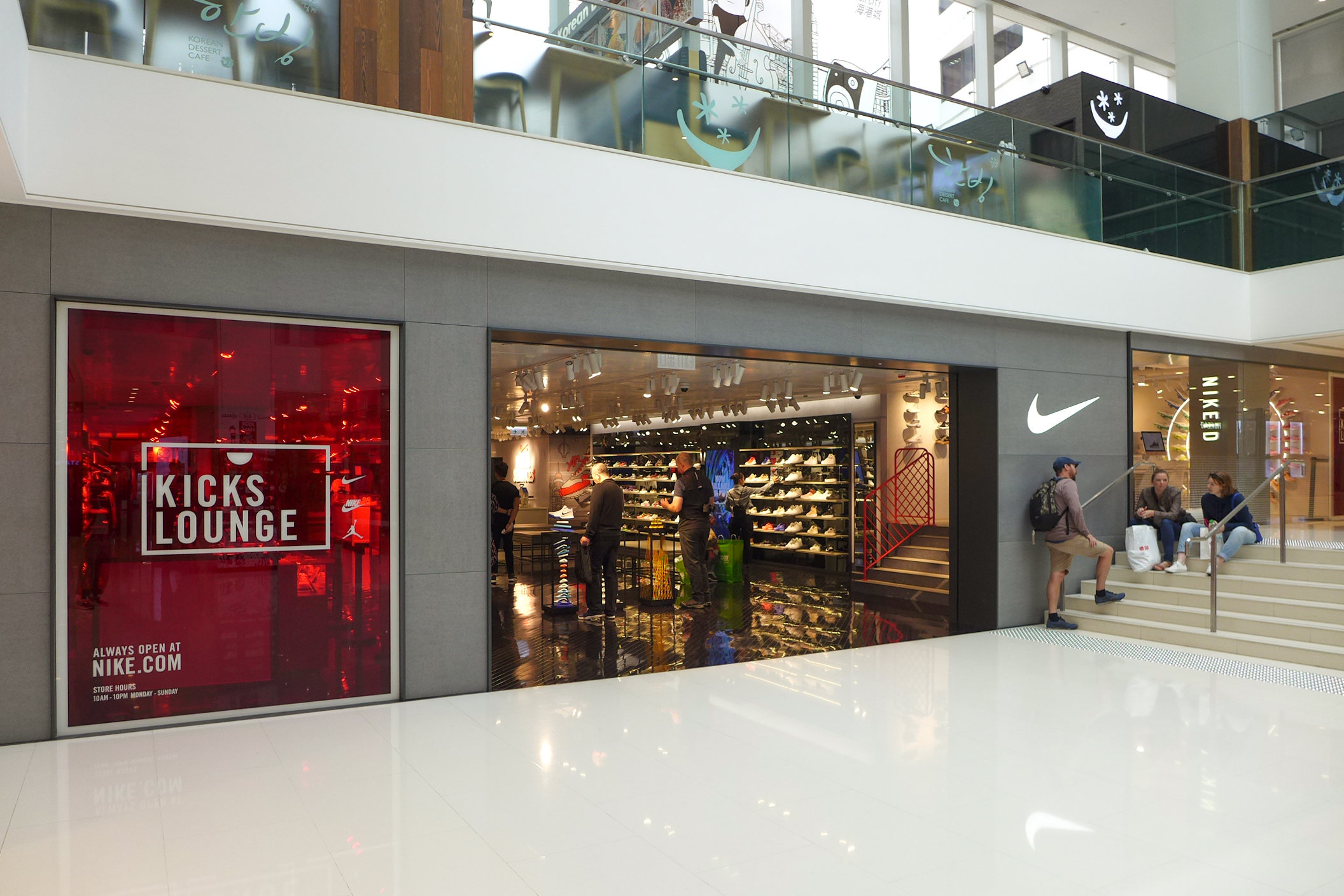
Nike Kicks Lounge in Harbour City, Hong Kong

US Vice President Mike Pence criticized Nike for "siding with the Chinese Communist Party and silencing free speech". He claimed that after Houston Rockets general manager Daryl Morey was criticized by the Chinese government for his tweet supporting the 2019 Hong Kong protests, Nike removed Rockets merchandise from its stores in China.

=== Vaporfly controversy ===
On January 31, 2020, the World Athletics issued new guidelines concerning shoes to be used in the upcoming Tokyo 2020 Olympics. These updates came in response to criticisms concerning technology in the Nike Vaporfly running shoes, which had been submitted beginning around 2017–2018. These criticisms stated that the shoes provided athletes with an unfair advantage over their opponents and some critics considered it to be a form of technology doping. According to Nike funded research, the shoes can improve efficiency by up to 4.2% and runners who have tested the shoe are saying that it causes reduced soreness in the legs; sports technologist Bryce Dyer attributes this to the ZoomX and carbon fiber plate since it absorbs the energy and "spring[s] runners forward". Some athletes, scientists, and fans have compared this to the 2008 LAZR swimsuit controversy.

Some of the major changes in the guidelines that have come about as a result of these criticisms include that the "sole must be no thicker than 40mm" and that "the shoe must not contain more than one rigid embedded plate or blade (of any material) that runs either the full length or only part of the length of the shoe. The plate may be in more than one part but those parts must be located sequentially in one plane (not stacked or in parallel) and must not overlap". The components of the shoes are not the only thing that had major changes; starting April 30, 2020, "any shoe must have been available for purchase by any athlete on the open retail market (online or in store) for a period of four months before it can be used in competition". Prior to these new guidelines World Athletics reviewed the Vaporfly shoes and "concluded that there is independent research that indicates that the new technology incorporated in the soles of road and spiked shoes may provide a performance advantage" and that it recommends further research to "establish the true impact of [the Vaporfly] technology."

=== Forced Uyghur labor allegations ===
In December 2021, the European Center for Constitutional and Human Rights filed a criminal complaint in a Dutch court against Nike and other brands, alleging that they benefited from the use of forced Uyghur labor in Xinjiang. In July 2023, the Canadian Ombudsperson for Responsible Enterprise opened an investigation into Nike to probe allegations of forced Uyghur labor in its supply chain. Research of the social democratic party in the European Parliament, the Sheffield Hallam University and further groups accused Nike in 2023 of using forced labor camps exploiting Muslim Uyghurs in China provided by the Anhui Huamao Group Co., Ltd. for production.

=== Welfare of animals used in sourcing ===
Following criticism from animal rights groups, Nike declared its intent in 2023 to phase out the use of wool sourced from lambs that had been subjected to mulesing, a controversial practice involving the removal of skin from live lambs.

Also in 2023, Nike pledged to eliminate the use of kangaroo leather in favor of a synthetic alternative, in response to animal activists' charge that the killing of kangaroos was unethical.

=== Exclusionary branding ===
In April 2026, Nike setup branding, including a billboard with the slogan "You didn’t come all this way for a walk in the park", at Peckham Rye park to coincide with the local parkrun. According to reports, Nike didn't give the organisers any advanced notice. The global head of communications for the parkrun organisation, Kirsty Woodbridge, accused Nike of “trying to shame” people unable to run.

That same month, Nike had branding outside their flagship Boston store, to coincide with the Boston Marathon, with the slogan "Runners welcome. Walkers tolerated". Following strong criticism for not being inclusive to runners of all levels, Nike removed the sign and issued an apology.

=== Human resources ===
In January 2026, Nike laid off 775 employees primarily from distribution centres in Tennessee and Mississippi, as it looks to automate processes and boost profits.

=== Libya ban ===
On 3 November 2026, Libyan Grand Mufti Sadiq al-Gharyani banned the sale of Nike products on Islamic grounds due to it depicting the Greek goddess.

== See also ==
- Bruce Brenn
- Dick Donahue
- Nike timeline
- Breaking2 – A project by Nike to break the 2 hour marathon barrier.
- List of companies based in Oregon
