= Mark Parker =

American businessman (born 1955)

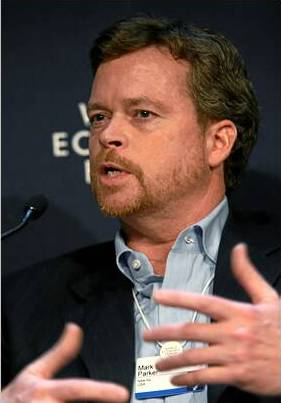
- Parker in 2008
- Born: October 21, 1955 (age 71); Poughkeepsie, New York, U.S.
- Education: Penn State University
- Title: Executive chairman of Nike, Inc.
- Successor: John Donahoe
- Spouse: Kathy Parker
- Children: 3

Mark Parker (born October 21, 1955) is an American businessman. He is the executive chairman of Nike, Inc. He was named the third CEO of the company in 2006 and was president and CEO until January 13, 2020. From 2023 to 2025, he was the chairman of the Walt Disney Company.

== Early life and education ==
Parker was born in Poughkeepsie, New York, the son of Meg and Bruce Parker. He graduated from Westhill High School in Stamford, Connecticut and later earned his bachelor's degree in Political Science at Penn State University in 1977. He ran on the Penn State track and cross country teams.

== Career ==
Parker joined Nike in 1979 as a footwear designer based in its R&D facility in Exeter, New Hampshire. He became Division Vice President in charge of development in 1987, Corporate Vice President in 1989, General Manager in 1993, and Vice President of Global Footwear in 1998. Prior to becoming vice president of Nike, he was co-president (with Charlie Denson) of the Nike brand beginning in March 2001. He still participates in shoe design, most notably on the Nike HTM project, creating limited edition footwear alongside Nike designer Tinker Hatfield and creative consultant Hiroshi Fujiwara. He has committed to ensuring that Nike remain environmentally conscious. After 10 years of work, Parker and his team launched the first "Green Shoe" that adheres to the principles of sustainability.

While CEO of Nike in 2012, Parker earned a total compensation of $15,425,608, which included a base salary of $1,609,615, a cash bonus of $594,190, stocks granted of $3,500,087, options granted of $4,199,250, and non-equity incentive plan compensation listed at $5,522,466. After being promoted to chairman in 2016, Parker's compensation tripled to over $47.6 million, $33.5 million of which came from stock rewards.

In 2015, Parker was named Fortune's Businessperson of the year. It was announced in June 2015 that Mark Parker is replacing Phil Knight as company chairman of Nike in 2016. In 2016, he ranked 14th in the New York Times' list of highest paid CEOs with an annual paycheck of 47.6 million. Parker was elected onto Walt Disney's board of directors early 2016. For the 2016 Summer Olympics in Rio, Parker collaborated with Christopher Marley to create an iridescent shoe.

In 2017, Parker took a 71% pay cut due to a year of poor sales at Nike and the layoff of 1,000 employees. Subsequently, his earnings were $13.9 million from stock and options. In 2019, Parker was criticized by certain right-wing media commentators for his embrace of Nike endorser Colin Kaepernick. Additionally, Parker was criticized for discontinuing a special edition of their Air Max 1 Quick Strike "Betsy Ross flag"-themed sneakers. In October 2019, Parker announced he would step down as Nike's CEO and become executive chairman of the company effective January 13, 2020. In January 2023, he was named chairman of the Walt Disney Company, succeeding Susan Arnold.

In January 2025, Parker left the board of the Walt Disney Company and was succeeded by James P. Gorman, chairman emeritus of Morgan Stanley as chairman of Disney's board of directors

== Personal life ==
Parker is married to Kathy Mills, a former world record holding track and field athlete whom he met at Penn State. They have three grown children.

=== Art collection ===
Parker is an arts supporter with a large ongoing collection of modern, low brow and underground contemporary art, along with many other rare collectibles, including a cursed monkey. Notable artists from Parker's collection include Andy Warhol, Adonna Khare, Mark Ryden, Todd Schorr, Natalia Fabia, Tim Biskup, Eric White, Sebastian Kruger, Charles Krafft, Glennray Tutor, Robert Crumb, Chris Mars, Sarina Brewer, Michael Speaker and Michael Leavitt. Parker kept a pair of bat-boots Nike designed for Michael Keaton to wear in the 1989 Batman movie. Other notable items include rare movie ephemera such as original props such as Star Wars C-3PO and models from Mars Attacks! (1996), The Day the Earth Stood Still (1951) and Back to the Future (1985).

Business positions
Preceded by Susan Arnold	Disney chairman 2023-2025	Succeeded by James P. Gorman
