= Nike Flywire =

Thread developed by Nike

- Close up image of the Flywire on an Air Max 'Hyperfly Supreme'
- Type: Yarn used in sneakers
- Inventor: Jay Meschter
- Inception: 2008; 18 years ago
- Manufacturer: Nike, Inc.
- Website: nike.com/flywire

Nike Flywire is a thread, composed of vectran or nylon, developed by Nike to minimize weight and maximize support, and used in the upper part of a sneaker. Shoes containing Flywire became available for consumer purchase in 2008.

== Development ==
Flywire was created by Jay Meschter, Director of Innovation at Nike. He began by taking a foot last and marking the key points of where a shoe needs to support the foot. When Meschter saw an embroidery machine, he determined the machine could be used to make long stitches. Long stitches allow lightweight fibers to support the foot in key points, instead of using layers of material that support the whole foot.

Nike designed Flywire with inspiration from a suspension bridge, where many cables provide support. This allows support to be placed where necessary, especially in the forefoot (metatarsus and toes) and heel. The cables are designed to wrap around the foot like tendons.

=== Vectran ===
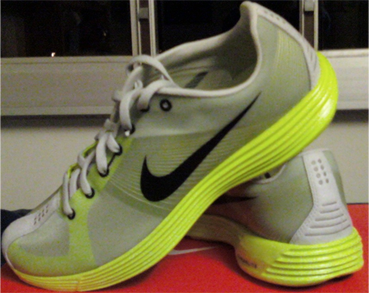
Nike Lunaracer+ sneakers, with the vectran fibers behind and around the Nike logo

Nike adapts Vectran fibers, which are produced by Kuraray, into embroidery threads, before use in the shoe. Vectran fibers are thinner than human hair, and relatively inexpensive. Vectran is lightweight, flexible, and high in tensile strength, the stress at which material deforms (five times stronger than steel), which makes it an ideal component for synthetic fibers. Vectran has also been used by NASA and in bicycle tires, among other things.

=== Weight ===
Due to the Vectran fibers, shoes containing Nike Flywire weigh as little as 93 grams, "approximately the weight of a Snickers bar with a bite missing." There is little excess weight because the upper is very thin, and the Vectran fibers are only added where support is needed. Shoe weight can be reduced up to 50% through the use of Flywire. Track spikes (running shoes with spikes added for traction) containing Flywire are now lighter than Michael Johnson's famous Golden Shoes of the 1996 Summer Olympics in Atlanta, Georgia. These spikes are so light that athletes claim they are like "a second skin" or "spikes coming out of their feet." This is a goal that Bill Bowerman tried to achieve as co-founder of Nike and a spike designer.

== Shoes ==
Many Nike shoes contain Flywire. These shoes are designed for a variety of activities and sports, including running, athletics, basketball, badminton, football, American football, baseball and tennis. The athletics shoes were debuted at the 2007 World Championships at Osaka, while the rest made their first appearance at the 2008 Summer Olympics, in Beijing, China, though all are now available for consumer purchase.
