= List of Portland State University alumni =

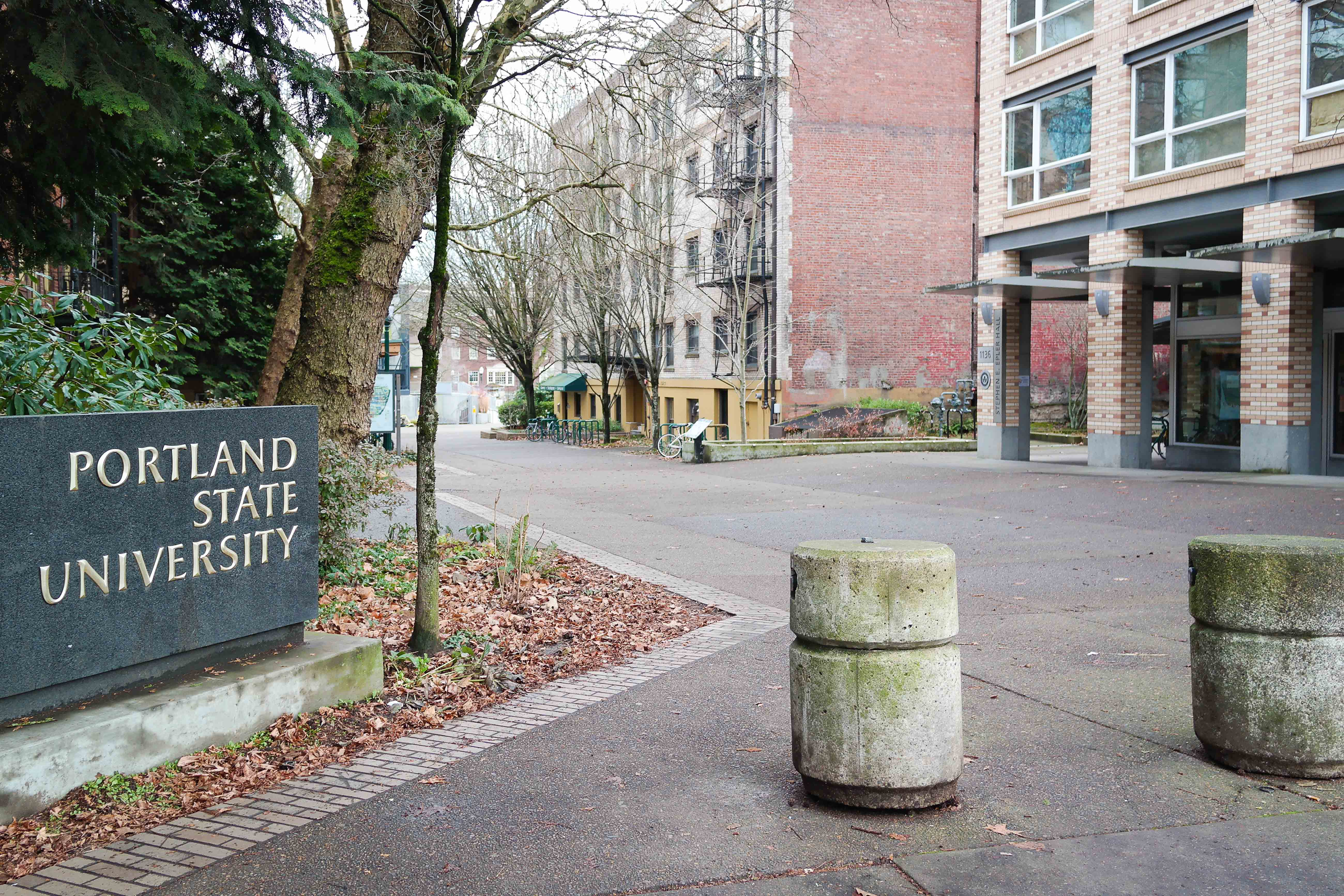
Portland State University sign near Epler Hall

Established as Vanport College in 1946, Portland State University is a public university officiated as a state institution in 1969. Located in the southwest Portland, Oregon, it is the only public university in the state that is located within a major metropolitan city, and is one of Oregon's largest universities. Its academic programs are organized in nine constituent schools and colleges, and have produced alumni across professions in the arts, sciences, business, academia, politics, and sports. As of 2019, the university claimed over 180,000 alumni worldwide.

== Legend ==
Notes and abbreviations used

- Individuals who may belong in multiple sections appear only in one.
- An empty class year or school/degree box indicates only that this information is unknown or unconfirmed.
- "DNG" indicates the alumnus or alumna attended but did not graduate; known year(s) of attendance accompany this if available. "N/A" will be present in the degree box for these individuals, as it is confirmed they did not receive degrees.

Colleges and schools

- CA – College of Arts
- CLAS – College of Liberal Arts and Sciences
- CE – College of Education
- CECS – Maseeh College of Engineering and Computer Science
- CUPA – College of Urban and Public Affairs
- GSBP – Graduate School of Book Publishing
- SB – School of Business
- SSW – School of Social Work

Defunct schools

- PSC – Portland State College (predecessor of Portland State University; dissolved 1969)
- VC – Vanport College (predecessor of Portland State College; dissolved 1955)

Degrees and certificates
B.A. – Bachelor of Arts
B.F.A. – Bachelor of Fine Arts
B.S. – Bachelor of Science
B.B.A. – Bachelor of Business Administration
B.S.A. – Bachelor of Arts and Science
M.A. – Master of Arts
M.F.A. – Master of Fine Arts
M.S. – Master of Science
M.B.A. – Master of Business Administration
M.Ed. – Master of Education
M.S.W. – Master of Social Work
PhD – Doctorate
Ed.D. – Doctor of Education

== Academia ==
Name	Class	School	Degree(s)	Notability	Ref.
Lee D. Baker	1989	CLAS	B.S.	Professor of anthropology, Duke University	
Jacob Biamonte			B.S.	Professor of quantum computing, Skolkovo Institute of Science and Technology	
Hans G. Furth	1960	CLAS	PhD	Professor emeritus of philosophy, The Catholic University of America	
Peter A. Griffin			B.S.	Professor of mathematics, California State University–Sacramento	
George Guthridge	1970	CLAS	B.A.	Professor emeritus of English, University of Alaska Fairbanks; professor of English, University of Maryland Global College	
Mitchell S. Jackson		CLAS	B.A., M.A.	Associate professor of English, New York University	
Michael Kazin		CLAS	M.A.	Professor of history, Georgetown University	
Bonnie McCay	1969	CLAS	B.A.	Professor emerita of anthropology, Rutgers University	
David McDowall	1973	CLAS	B.S.	Professor of criminology, University at Albany, SUNY	
Roberta Rudnick	1980	CLAS	B.S.	Assistant professor of geology, Harvard University; University of California, Santa Barbara	
Thomas Talbott			B.S.	Professor emeritus of philosophy, Willamette University	
Jack Ernest Vincent	1957	PSC	B.S.	Professor emeritus of political science, University of Idaho	
Dali Yang	1988	CLAS	M.A.	Professor of political science, University of Chicago	

== Architecture and design ==
Name	Class year	School(s)	Degree(s)	Notability	Ref.
Sergio Palleroni				Architect and co-founder of BASIC Initiative	

== Art and literature ==
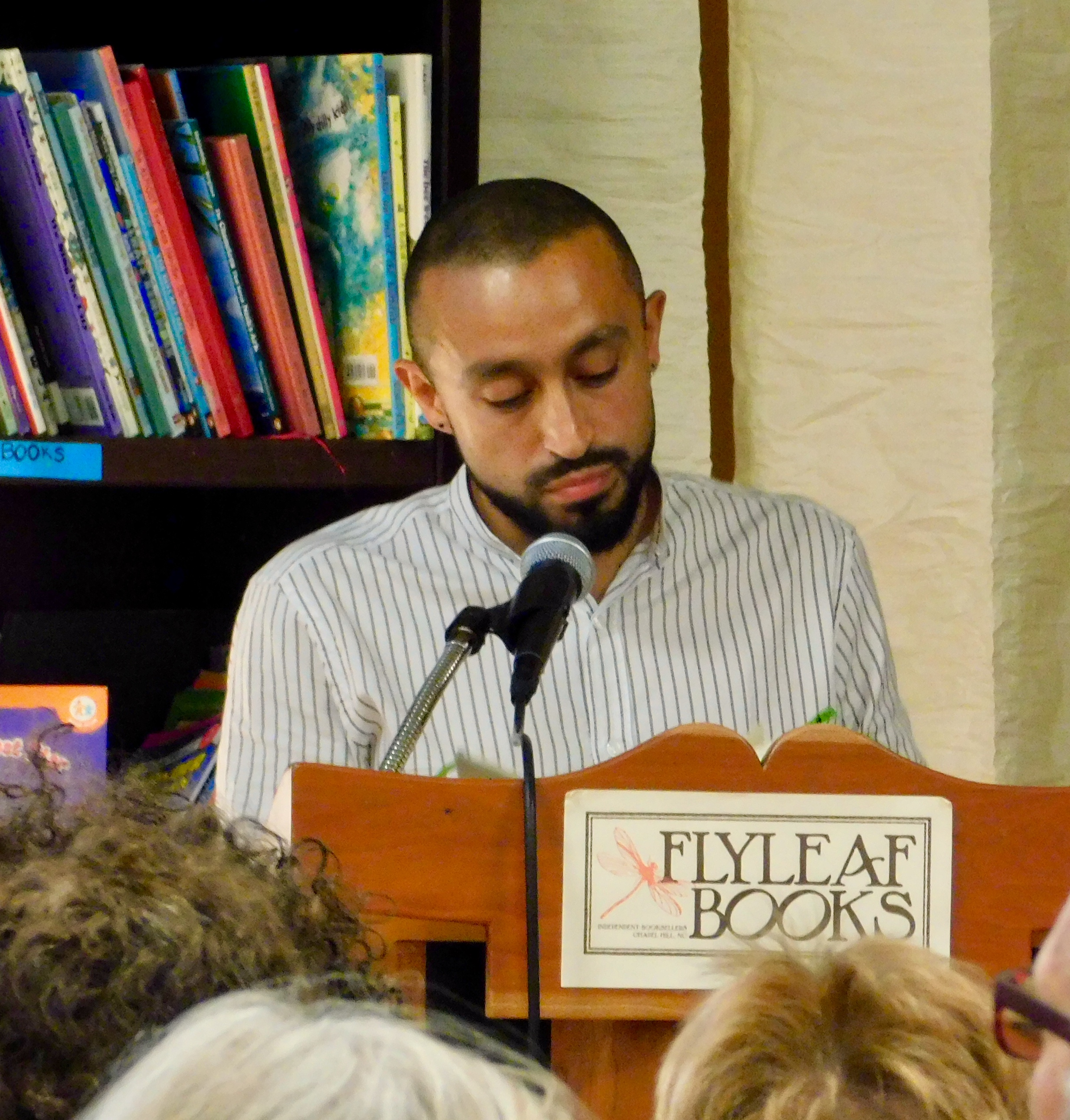
Francisco Laguna Correa, poet

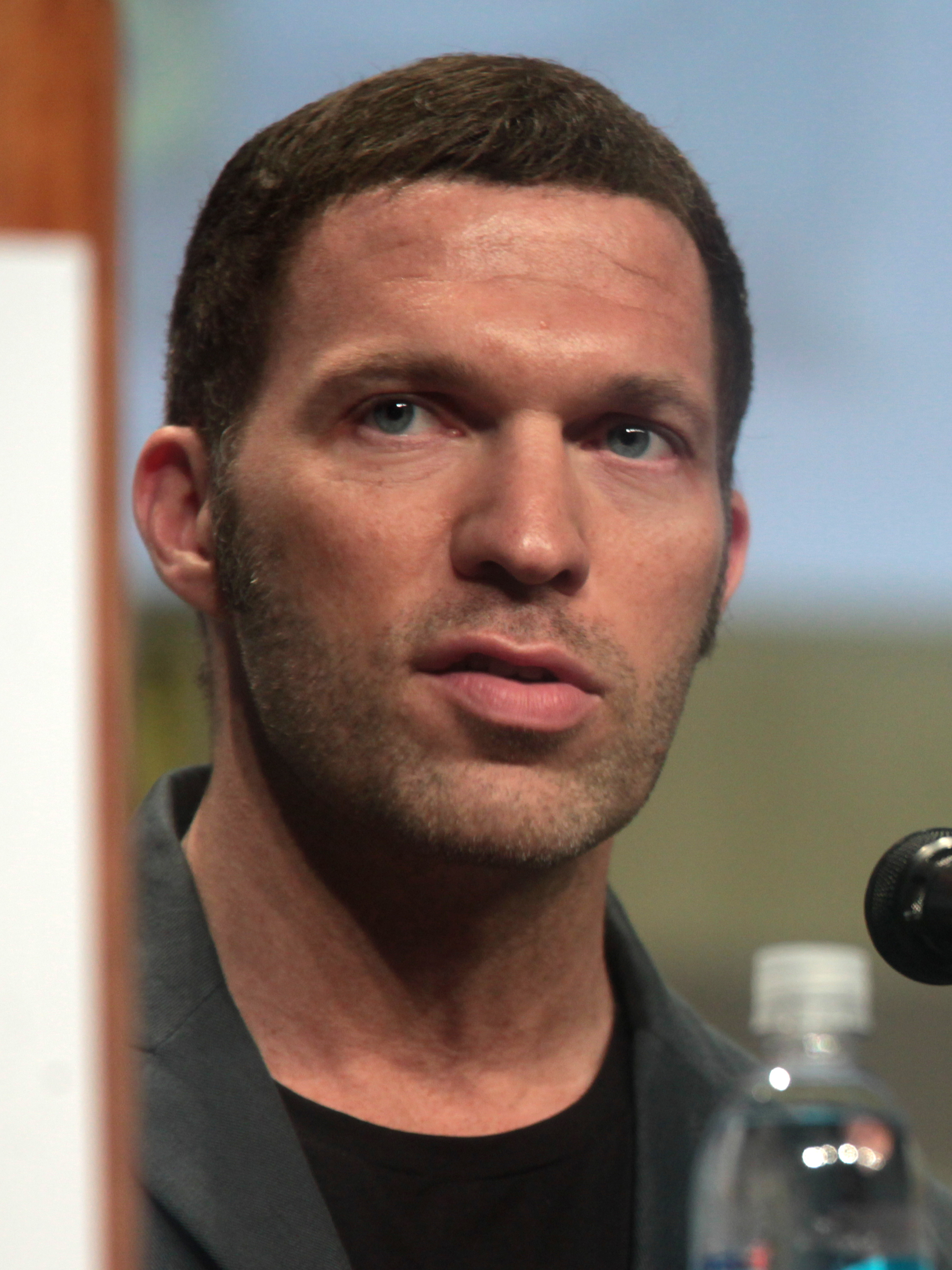
Travis Knight, animator

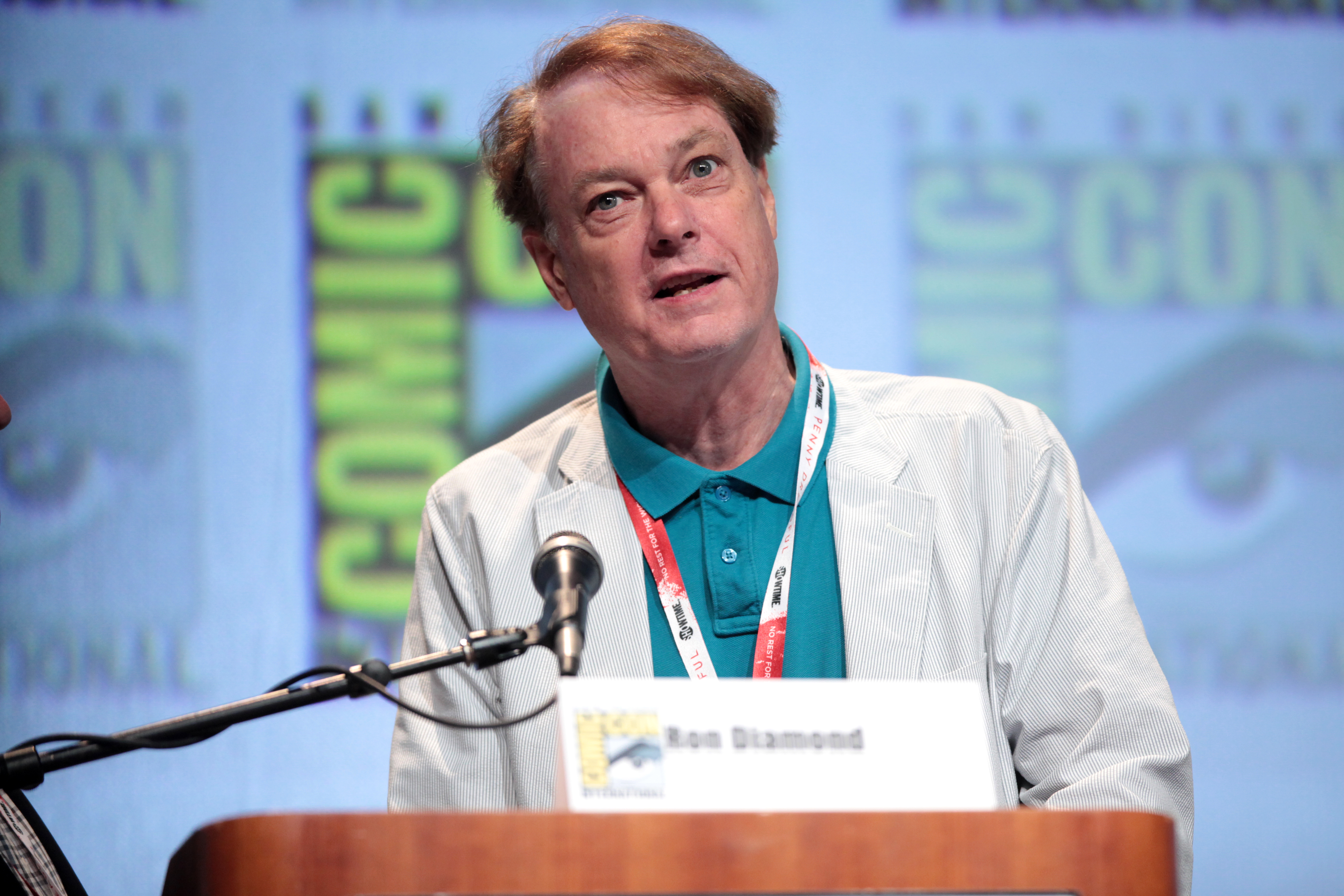
Bill Plympton, animator

Name	Class year	School(s)	Degree(s)	Notability	Ref.
Holly Andres	2004	CA	M.F.A.	Photographer	
Damali Ayo	2006	CA	M.F.A.	Conceptual artist	
Cal Barnes	DNG		—N/a	Novelist and playwright	
John Callahan	DNG		—N/a	Cartoonist, creator of Pelswick	
Francisco Laguna Correa		CLAS	B.A.	Poet, professor of Latinx studies at University of Denver	
Walt Curtis				Poet and painter	
Carolyn Davidson	1971	CLAS	B.A.	Graphic designer; creator of the Nike swoosh	
Gwen M. Davidson	1987	CA	M.F.A.	Contemporary artist	
Michael Dickman	DNG		—N/a	Poet, recipient of Alfred Hodder Fellowship at Princeton University	
David James Duncan	1973	CLAS	B.A.	Novelist and essayist	
Ann Gardner	1974	CA	M.F.A.	Glass artist	
Larry Harvey	DNG		—N/a	Artist, co-founder of Burning Man festival	
Michael Hornburg	DNG		—N/a	Novelist, journalist	
Christopher Howell	1971	CLAS	M.A.	Poet, two-time National Endowment Fellowship winner	
Anne Hughes				Art patron, gallery owner	
Ariana Jacob	2010	CA	M.F.A.	Contemporary artist	
Lee Kelly		VC		Sculptor	
Richard Kennedy	1958	PSC	B.A.	Children's author, proponent of Oxfordian theory of Shakespeare authorship	
Travis Knight	1998	CLAS	B.S.	Animator; CEO of LAIKA	
Jack Ohman		CLAS	B.A.	Editorial cartoonist of The Oregonian	
Pierre Ouellette				Science fiction author	
Bill Plympton	1968	PSC	B.A.	Animator	
Mike Richardson	1977	CA	B.A.	Publisher, founder of Dark Horse Comics	
Deborah J. Ross	1973	CLAS	M.S.	Science fiction and fantasy author	
Laura Ross-Paul	1976	CA	M.F.A.	Painter	
Roland Smith	DNG		—N/a	Young adult fiction author	
Howard Ben Tré	1978	CLAS	B.S.A.	Glass artist	
Celeste West		CLAS	B.A.	Librarian and author	
John Sibley Williams		GSBP	M.A.	Poet and publisher	

== Business and finance ==
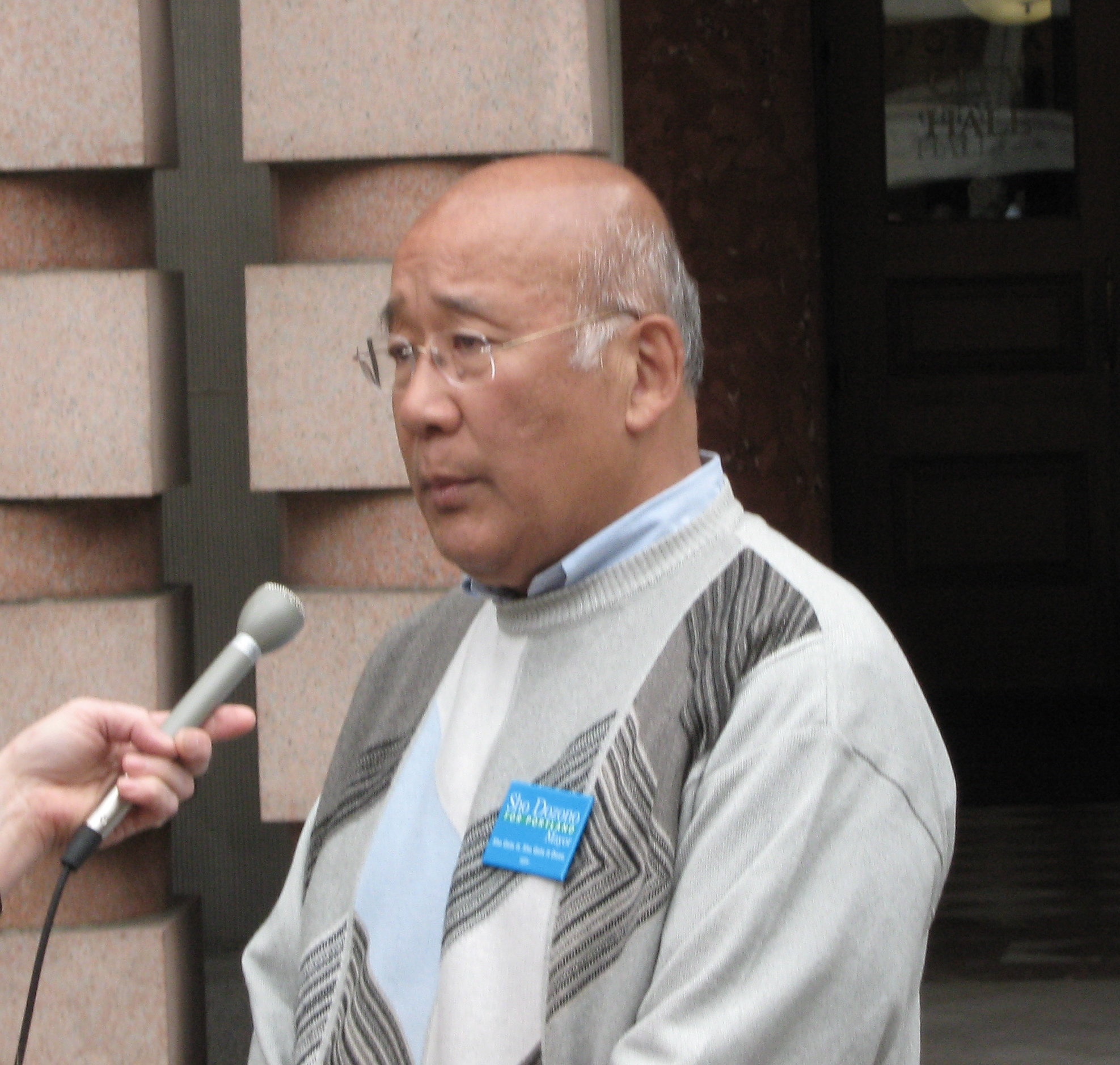
Sho Dozono, businessman

Name	Class year	School(s)	Degree(s)	Notability	Ref.
D. Scott Davis			B.S.	Chairman and CEO of UPS	
Sho Dozono	1968	CE	M.Ed.	Businessman, CEO of Azumano Travel	
Mike Erickson	1988	SB	B.S.	Entrepreneur	
Judi Hofer				Executive CEO, The May Department Stores Company	
Darren Kimura	DNG		—N/a	Inventor of MicroCSP	
Steven Smith	DNG		—N/a	Entrepreneur, founder of Tazo Tea Company	
Norm Winningstad	1973	SB	M.B.A.	Businessperson, engineer	

== Civil society ==
Name	Class year	School(s)	Degree(s)	Notability	Ref.
Arthur Honeyman	1965, 1974	CLAS	B.S., M.A.	Disability rights activist, writer	
Ashley Gjøvik	2012		B.S.	Activist and Apple Inc. whistleblower	
Musse Olol	1991			Social activist	
Richard Pimentel				Disability rights activist	
Paul Popham		PSC		Founder of the Gay Men's Health Crisis; Vietnam War veteran	
Robert Robideau		CLAS	B.S.	Native American activist; acquitted in 1975 shooting deaths of two FBI agents in South Dakota	
Chea Vannath				Cambodian anti-corruption activist	

== Entertainment ==
=== Film, television, and performing arts ===
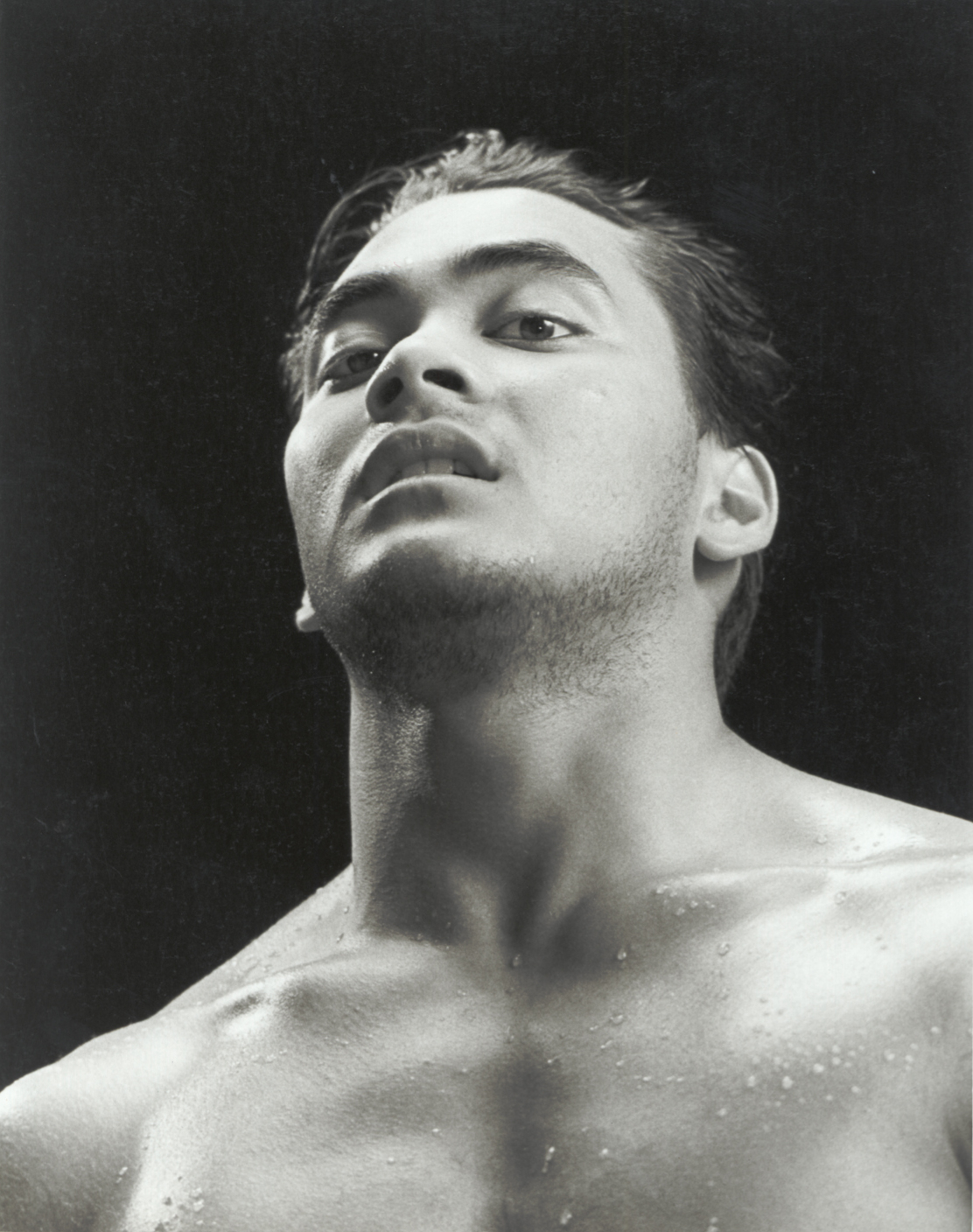
Mark Dacascos, actor and martial artist

Name	Class year	School(s)	Degree(s)	Notability	Ref.
Bruce Abbott	DNG		—N/a	Film and television actor	
Cal Barnes	DNG		—N/a	Film actor and filmmaker	
Mark Dacascos				Film actor and martial artist	
Karl Glusman	DNG		—N/a	Film actor	
Katie Harman	2003	CLAS	B.S.	2002 Miss America	
Ian Karmel	2009		B.S.	Stand-up comedian	
Terence Knox		CA	M.F.A.	Film actor	
Jennifer Lyon	DNG		—N/a	Competitor on Survivor: Palau	
Holly Madison	DNG		—N/a	Playboy model, reality television star	
Kari Ann Peniche				Miss Teen USA winner	
Rick Reynolds	1976	CLAS	B.S.	Comedian	
Sara Jean Underwood				Playboy model, actress	
Erin Way				Actress	

=== Music ===
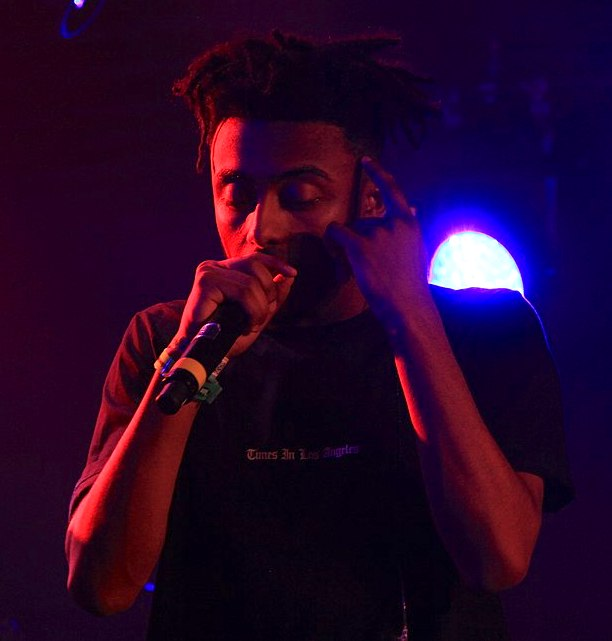
Aminé, rapper

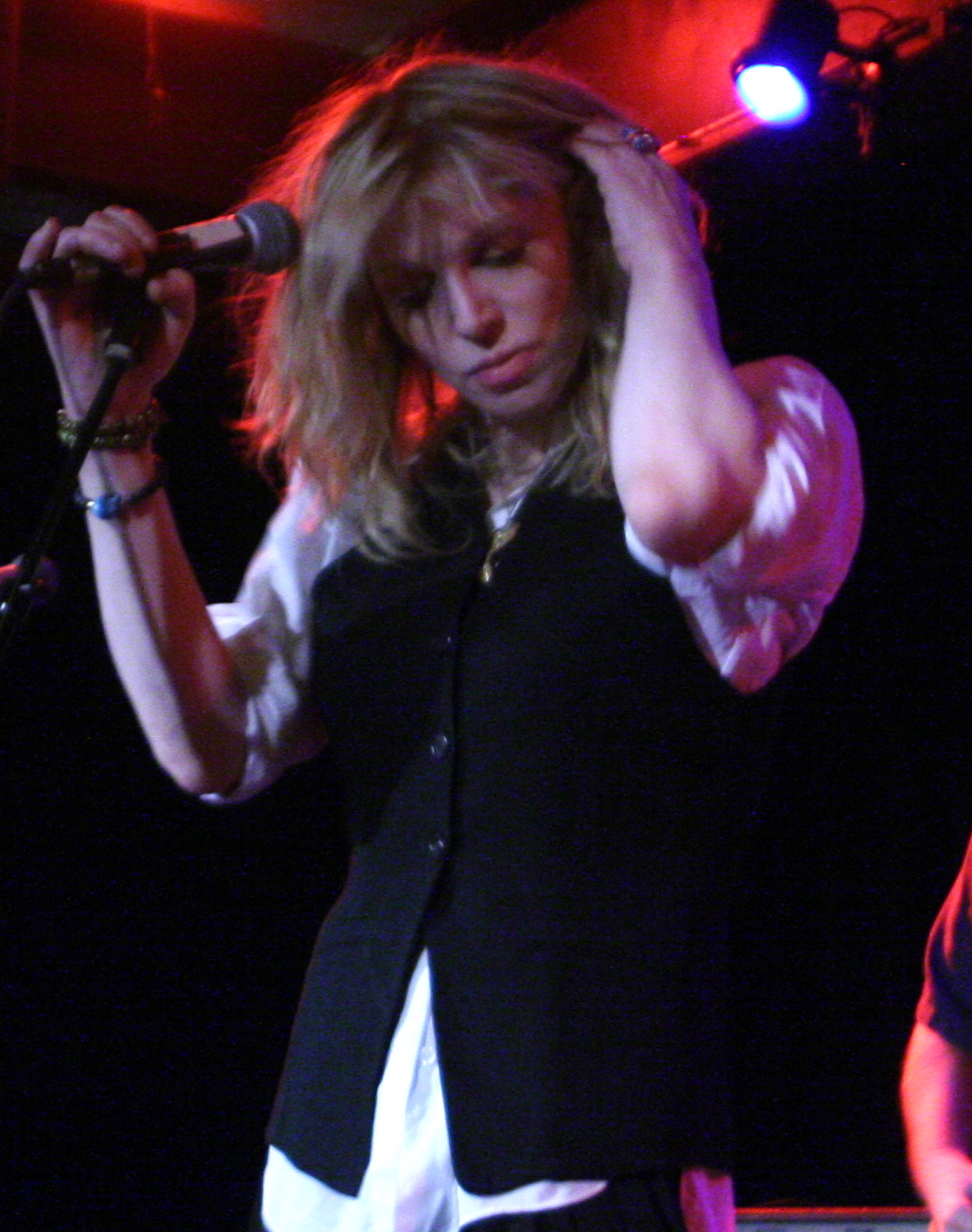
Courtney Love, frontwoman of Hole

Name	Class year	School(s)	Degree(s)	Notability	Ref.
Aminé	DNG		—N/a	Hip-hop artist	
Mel Brown				Jazz drummer, collaborator of Stevie Wonder and Marvin Gaye	
Ken Butler	1977	CA	M.F.A.	Experimental musician	
Dave Carter		CLAS	B.S.	Folk musician	
Jack Ely				Musician, singer of The Kingsmen	
Eric Funk	1972, 1978	CLAS	B.A., M.A.	Contemporary classical composer and conductor	
Haley Heynderickx				Singer-songwriter	
Issa	2008	SB	B.S.	Singer and songwriter	
Courtney Love	DNG; att. c. 1983	CLAS	—N/a	Musician and actress; frontwoman of Grammy-nominated rock band Hole	
Audrey Luna	2001	CLAS	B.A.	Grammy-winning soprano; hit highest note ever sung at New York's Metropolitan Opera in 2017	
Rob Simonsen				Film composer	
Lawrence Leighton Smith	1957	CLAS	B.A.	Conductor and pianist	
Esperanza Spalding	DNG; att. 2000–2001		—N/a	Four-time Grammy-winning jazz musician	
Nancy Wilson	DNG; att. 1973		—N/a	Singer and guitarist of Heart	

== Humanities ==
Name	Class year	School(s)	Degree(s)	Notability	Ref.
Chet Orloff		CLAS	M.A.	Historian, director emeritus of Oregon Historical Society	
Mark Weber		CLAS	B.A.	Historian, director of Institute for Historical Review	
Amos Yong				Pentecostal theologian	

== Media and communications ==
Name	Class year	School(s)	Degree(s)	Notability	Ref.
Kambiz Hosseini				Political satirist, radio host	
Paul Linnman		CLAS	B.A.	Television journalist, radio host	
Lana Lokteff				Alt-right YouTube personality	
Michael Moynihan	2000	CLAS	B.A.	Journalist, author of Lords of Chaos	

== Government and politics ==
=== Heads of state and government ===
Name	Class year	School(s)	Degree(s)	Notability	Ref.
Casten Nemra	2000	SB	B.B.A.	7th president of the Republic of the Marshall Islands	

=== Governors of the United States ===
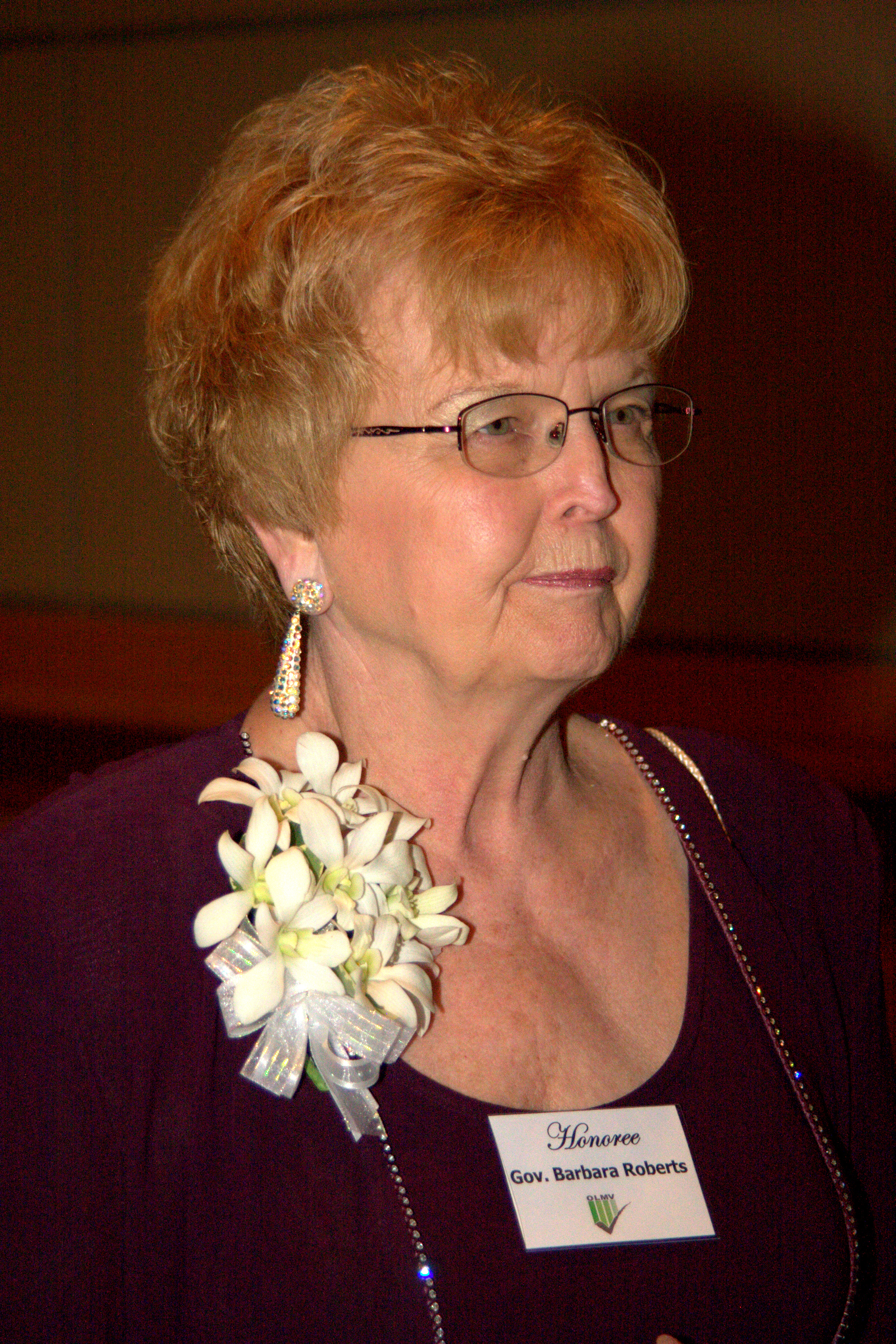
Barbara Roberts, 34th governor of Oregon

Name	Class year	School(s)	Degree(s)	Notability	Ref.
Barbara Roberts	1964	CLAS	B.A.	34th governor of Oregon	

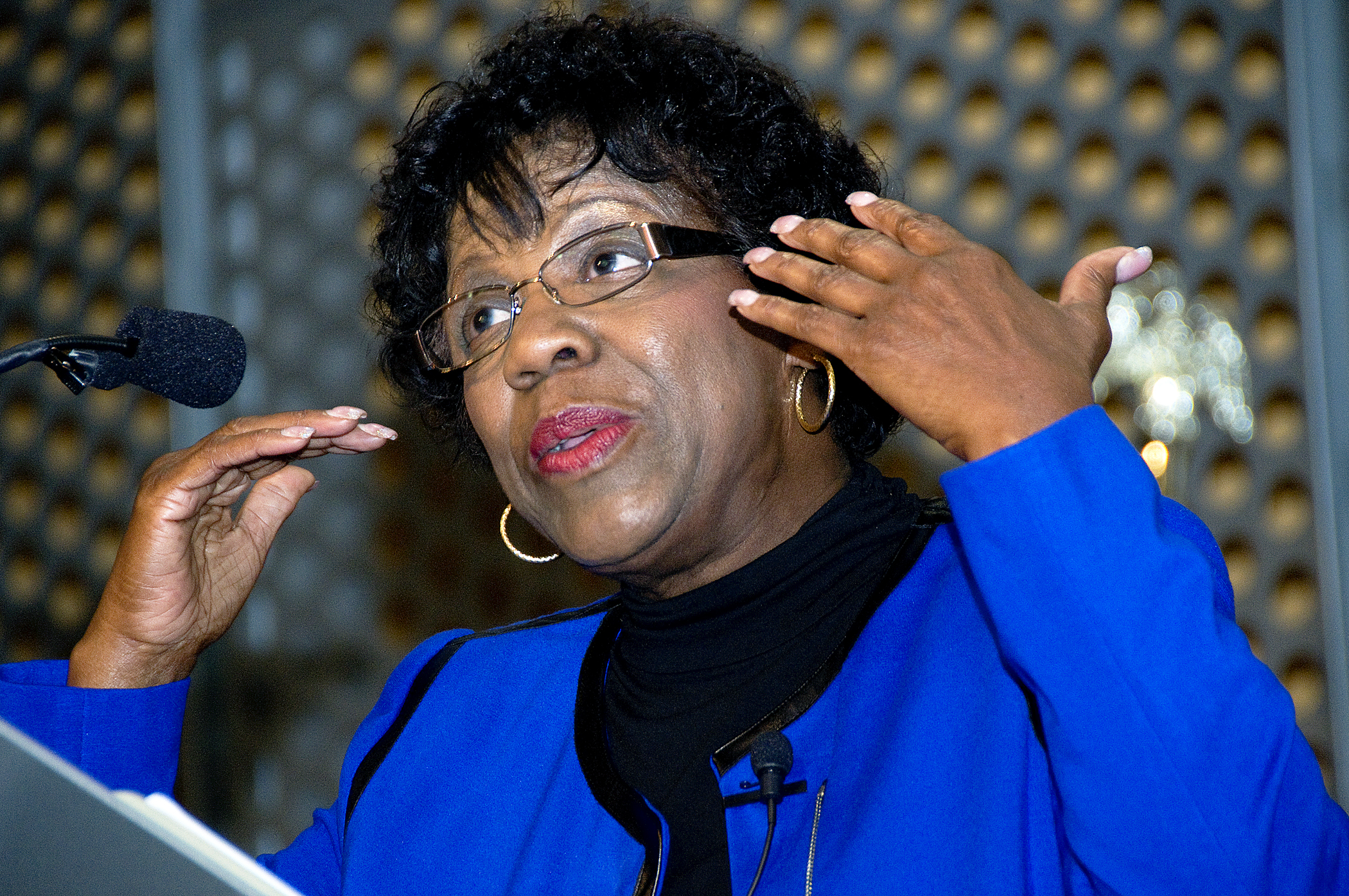
Margaret Carter, Oregon senator

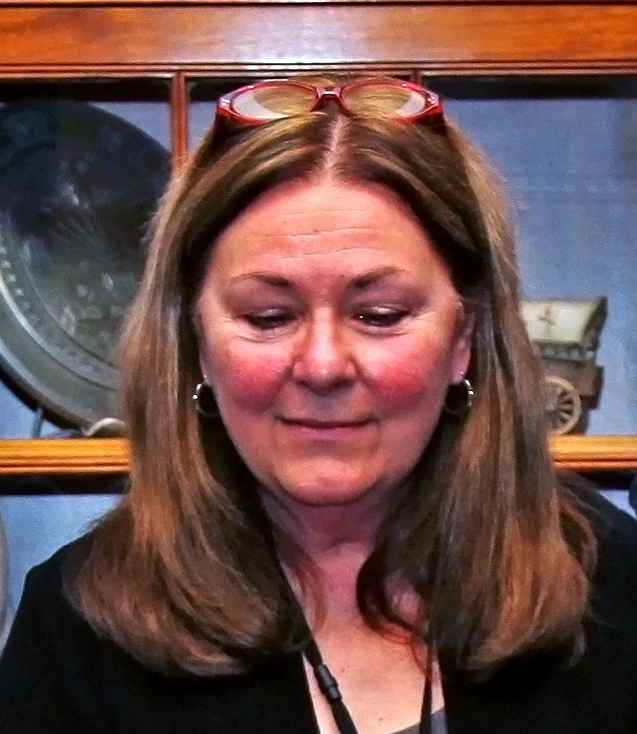
Deborah Boone, Democratic member of Oregon House of Representatives

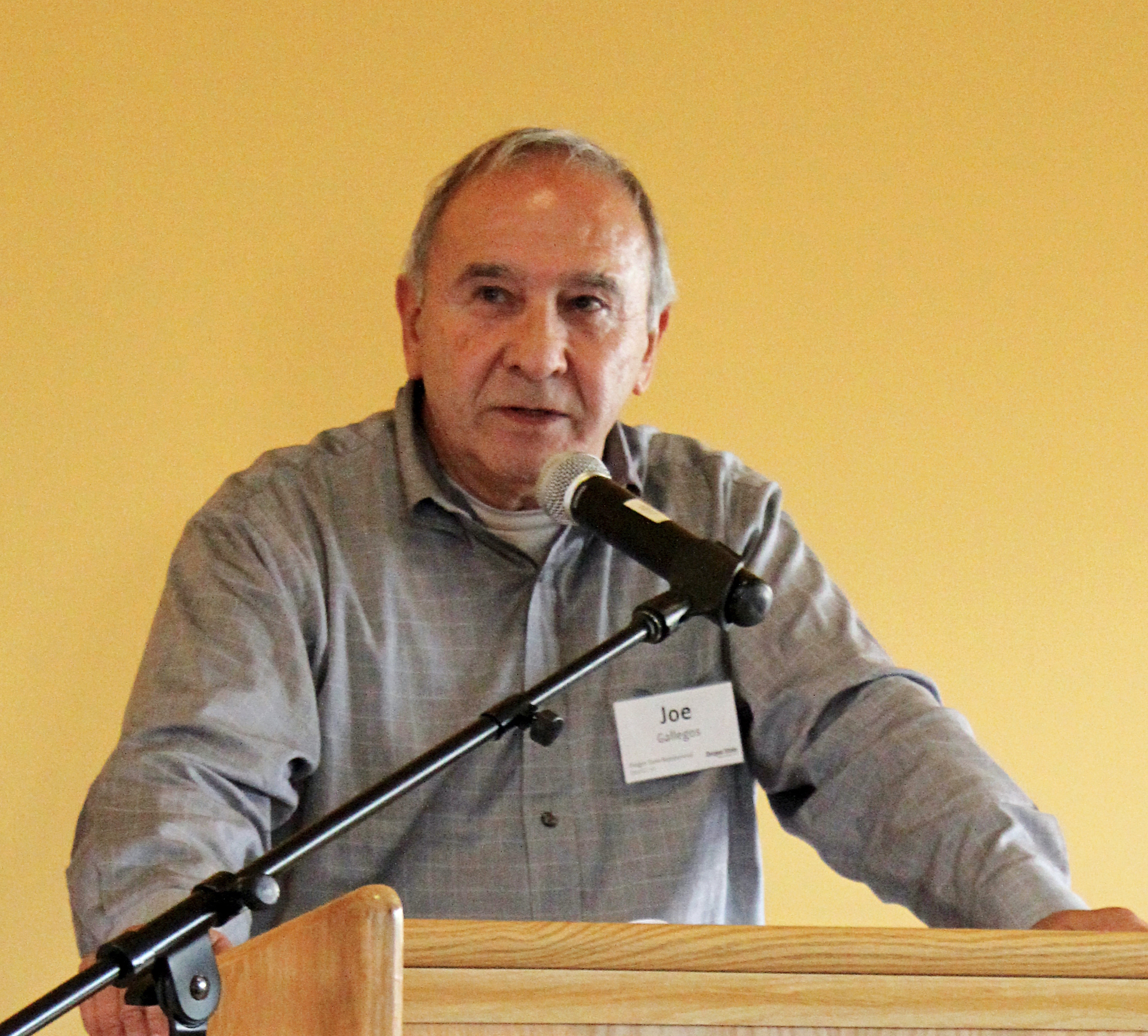
Joe Gallegos, Democratic member of Oregon House of Representatives

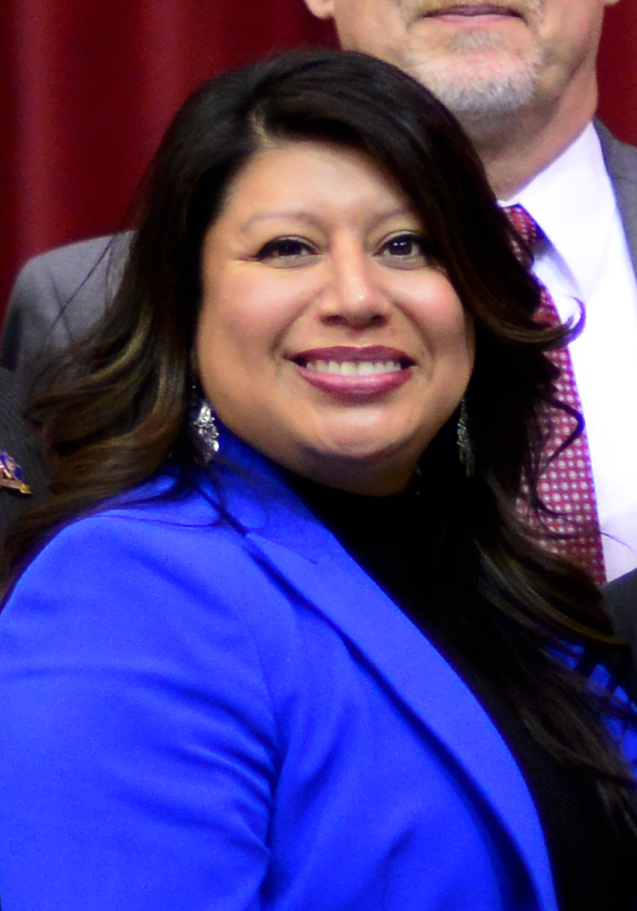
Teresa Alonso Leon, Democratic member of Oregon House of Representatives

=== State senators ===
Name	Class year	School(s)	Degree(s)	Notability	Ref.
Margaret Carter	1972	CE	B.A.	Democratic member of Oregon State Senate	
Avel Gordly	1974	CLAS	B.S.	First African American woman elected to the Oregon State Senate	
Rod Monroe	1965, 1969	CLAS	B.S., M.A.	Democratic member of Oregon State Senate	
Chuck Riley				Democratic member of Oregon State Senate, 15th district	
Martha Schrader		CE, CUPA	M.A.	Democratic member of Oregon State Senate, 20th district	
Chip Shields		SSW	M.S.W.	Democratic member of Oregon State Senate, 22nd district	
Rob Wagner		CLAS	B.S.	Democratic member of Oregon State Senate, 19th district	

=== State representatives ===
Name	Class year	School(s)	Degree(s)	Notability	Ref.
Jeff Barker		CLAS	B.S.	Democratic member of Oregon House of Representatives, 28th district	
Rick Bauman				Democratic member of Oregon House of Representatives, 11th/13th district	
Deborah Boone		CLAS	B.S.	Democratic member of Oregon House of Representatives, 32nd district	
Scott Bruun		SB	M.B.A.	Republican member of Oregon House of Representatives, 37th district	
Albert H. Densmore	1968	CLAS	B.S.	Democratic member Oregon House of Representatives, 50th district	
Richard Devlin	1976	CLAS	B.S.	Democratic member of Oregon House of Representatives and Senate	
Margaret Doherty		CLAS	B.A.	Democratic member of the Oregon House of Representatives, 35th district	
Larry Galizio		CUPA	PhD	Democratic member of the Oregon House of Representatives, 35th district	
Joe Gallegos		CLAS, SSW	B.S., M.S.W.	Democratic member of the Oregon House of Representatives, 13th district	
Chris Gorsek	2004	CLAS	PhD	Democratic member of the Oregon House of Representatives, 49th district	
Gary Hansen				Democratic member of the Oregon House of Representatives, 44th district	
Diego Hernandez		SSW	M.S.W.	Democratic member of the Oregon House of Representatives, 47th district	
Nick Kahl	2000	CA	B.A.	Democratic member of the Oregon House of Representatives, 49th district	
Teresa Alonso Leon	2013	CUPA	M.A.	Democratic member of the Oregon House of Representatives, 22nd district	
Thomas Lockhart		SB	M.B.A.	Republican member of the Wyoming House of Representatives, 57th district	
Steve March	1997	Urban Studies	M.A., PhD	Democratic Member of the Oregon House of Representatives, 46th district	
Jim Moeller	DNG	SSW	—N/a	Democratic member of the Washington House of Representatives, 49th district	
Ron Packard	DNG		—N/a	Republican member of the California House of Representatives, 43rd district	
Tawna Sanchez	2012	SSW	M.S.W.	Democratic member of Oregon House of Representatives, 43rd district	
Bruce Starr	1991	CLAS	B.S.	Republican member of Oregon House of Representatives and State Senate	
Carolyn Tomei		SSW	M.S.W.	Democratic member of Oregon House of Representatives, 41st district	
Matt Wand	1997	CLAS	B.S.	Republican member of Oregon House of Representatives, 49th district	

=== Other U.S. political figures ===
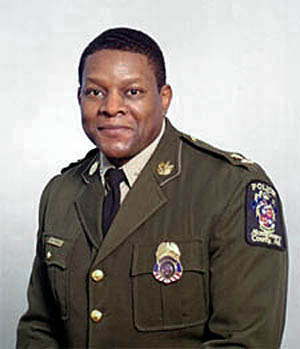
Charles Moose, police officer

Name	Class year	School(s)	Degree(s)	Notability	Ref.
Joe DeLaCruz	DNG			Native American program leader, elected president of National Congress of American Indians	
Susan Eggman	2002	SSW	PhD	Member of California State Assembly, 13th district	
Joseph LeBaron	1969	CLAS	B.S.	U.S. ambassador to Qatar	
Marisa Lino	1971	CLAS	B.S.	U.S. ambassador to Albania	
Gladys McCoy	1967	SSW	M.S.W.	First African American woman elected to public office in Oregon	
Charles Moose		CUPA	M.A., PhD	Former police chief for Montgomery County, Maryland, one of the sites of the Beltway Sniper attacks	

=== Judges ===
Name	Class year	School(s)	Degree(s)	Notability	Ref.
Anna J. Brown	1975	CLAS	B.S.	U.S. federal judge	
Paul De Muniz	1972	CLAS	B.S.	Oregon Supreme Court chief justice	
R. William Riggs	1961	CLAS	B.A.	Oregon Supreme Court justice	
Betty Roberts	1958	PSC	B.S. Education	First woman to serve on the Oregon Supreme Court and Oregon Court of Appeals	

=== International political figures ===
Name	Class year	School(s)	Degree(s)	Notability	Ref.
Anas Khalid Al Saleh	1997	B.S.	SB	Deputy prime minister of Kuwait	

== Sciences and technology ==
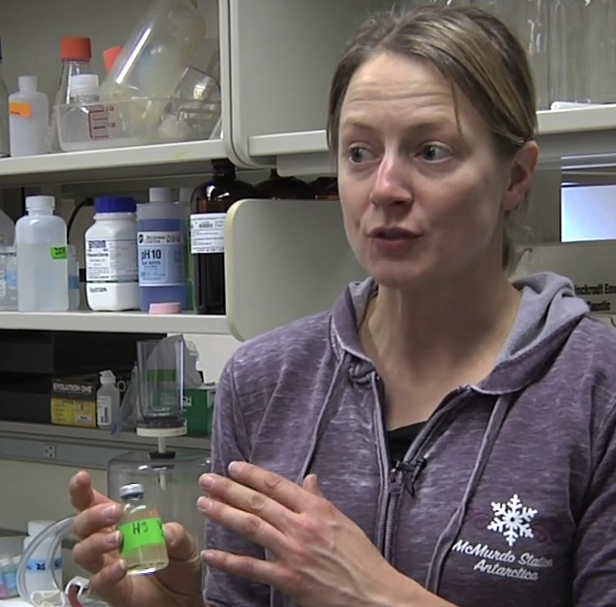
Jill Mikucki, microbiologist

Name	Class year	School(s)	Degree(s)	Notability	Ref.
Chad Cary		CLAS	M.S. in Geography	National Oceanic and Atmospheric Administration (NOAA) Commissioned Officer Corps rear admiral; Director, NOAA Commissioned Officer Corps (2024–present)	
John Hughes		SSW	M.S.W.	Pioneer in school-based alcohol and drug prevention efforts	
Fariborz Maseeh		CLAS	B.S., M.S.	Pioneer in the field of micro-electro mechanical systems (MEMS); founder of IntelliSense	
Jill Mikucki	2001	CLAS	M.S.	Microbiologist and Antarctic researcher; professor of microbiology at University of Tennessee, Knoxville	
Bruce Ogilvie		CLAS	M.S.	Sports psychologist and professor, San Jose State University	
Sage Sharp		CLAS	B.S.	Programmer who contributed to Linux kernel	

== Sports ==
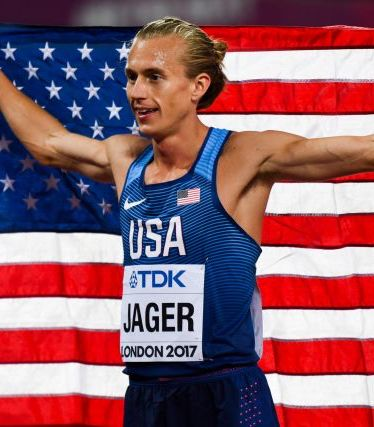
Evan Jager, distance runner

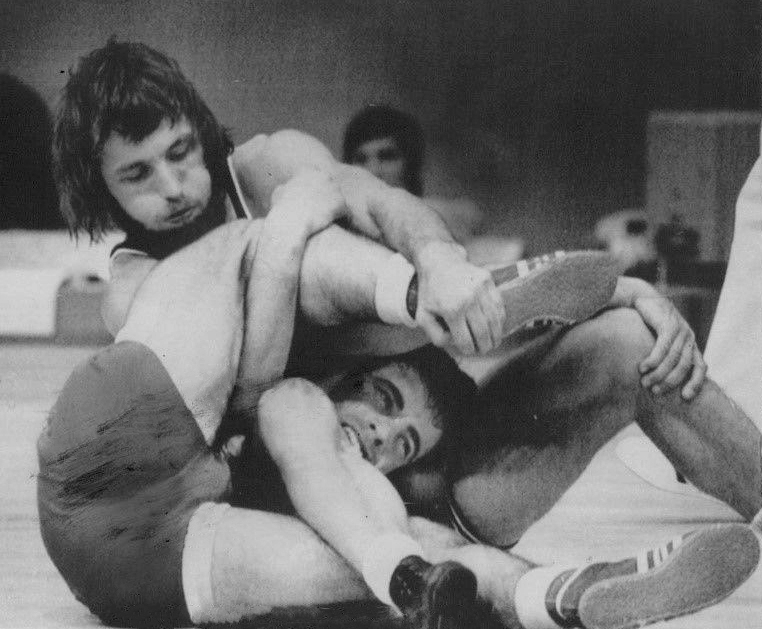
Rick Sanders, folkstyle and freestyle wrestler

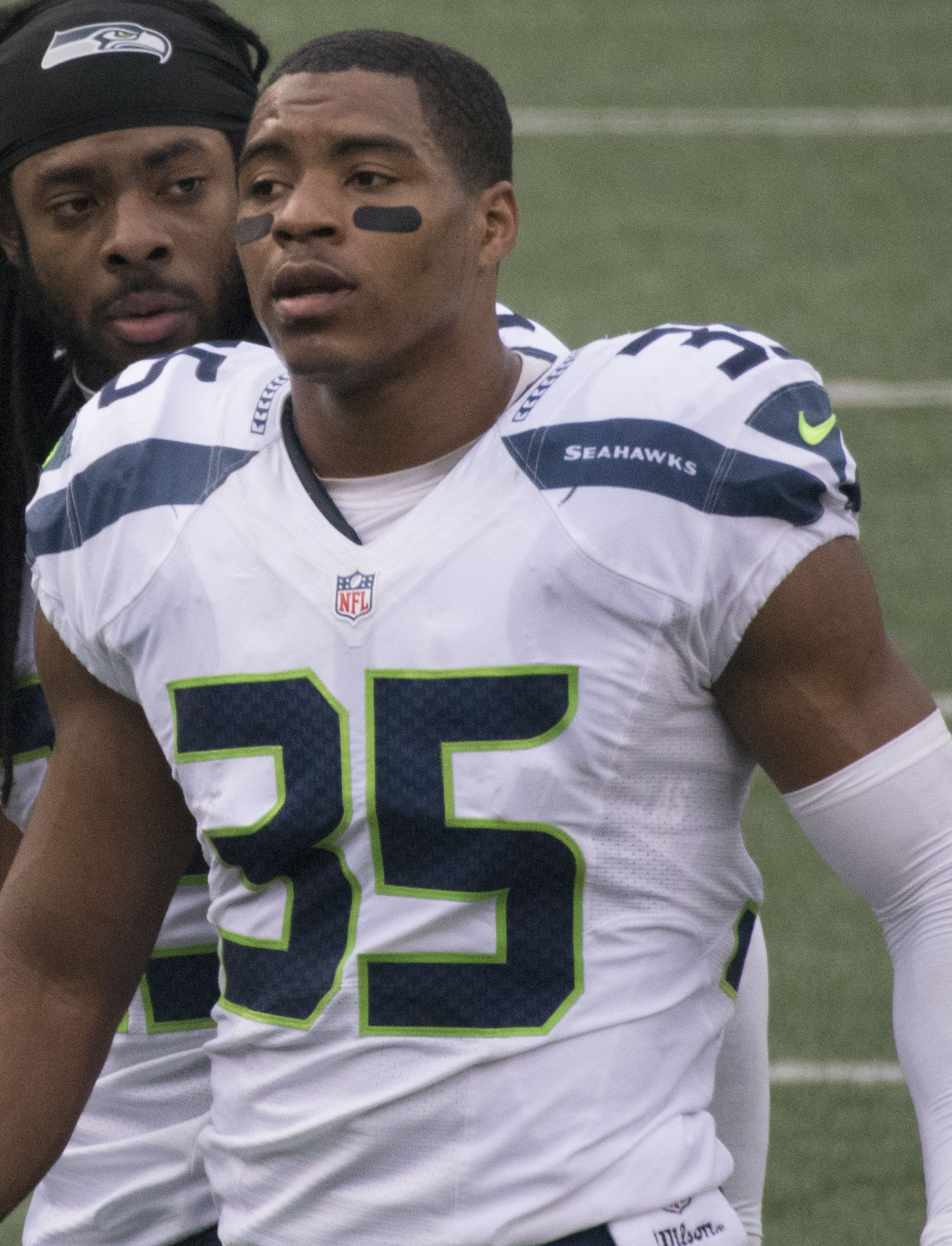
DeShawn Shead, Seattle Seahawks cornerback

Name	Class year	School(s)	Degree(s)	Notability	Ref.
Shaun Bodiford				Football wide receiver, New York Giants; Oakland Raiders	
Kameron Canaday				NFL player	
Tony Curtis				Football backup tight end, Dallas Cowboys	
Clint Didier				NFL tight end, Super Bowl XVII Champion	
Dan Frantz				Football player, Chicago Rush	
Adam Hayward	2006			Linebacker, Tampa Bay Buccaneers	
Darick Holmes				NFL running back, Buffalo Bills	
Evan Jager	2015	CLAS	B.S.	Distance runner	
Dave Jansen				Wrestler, mixed martial artist	
Joe Kraemer				Major League Baseball player, Chicago Cubs	
Jeff Lahti				Retired Major League Baseball pitcher; 1982 World Series Champion	
Neil Lomax	1981	CLAS	B.S.	National Football League quarterback, St. Louis/Arizona Cardinals (1981–89)	
Steve Olin	1988			Major League Baseball pitcher	
Shannon O'Keefe				Professional bowler, coach	
Mike Pierce				Two-time All-American wrestler; professional mixed martial artist, formerly competed in the UFC	
Gordon Riese	1964			Portland State pitcher, Pac-10 referee	
Richard Sanders				Wrestler, NCAA, FILA and Summer Olympics	
Bree Schaaf	2002	CLAS	B.A.	U.S. Olympic bobsledder, 2010 Winter Olympics, Vancouver	
Paul Schrieber				Major League Baseball umpire	
Jordan Senn				Linebacker, Carolina Panthers	
DeShawn Shead	2011	CLAS	B.S.	Safety for the 2014 Super Bowl champion Seattle Seahawks	
Dave Stief				Football wide receiver, St. Louis Cardinals and Washington Redskins	
Julius Thomas				Tight end for the Jacksonville Jaguars	
Tom Trebelhorn	1970	CLAS	B.S.	Major League Baseball manager	
Ime Udoka				Head coach for the Houston Rockets in the National Basketball Association	
Dominic Waters				Israel Basketball Premier League basketball player	
Freeman Williams				Retired National Basketball Association guard	

== Miscellaneous ==
Name	Class year	School(s)	Degree(s)	Notability	Ref.
Julienne Bušić		CLAS	M.A.	Widow of Zvonko Bušić; convicted in hijacking of TWA Flight 355	
Patrice Lumumba Ford		CLAS	B.A.	Convicted member of the terrorist group, the Portland Seven	
Randall Woodfield	DNG; att. 1970–1974		—N/a	Green Bay Packers draftee; later convicted serial killer	
