= Project Q Baby =

2005 Chinese animated series

- Chinese: Q城宝贝
- Genre: Animated series
- Written by: Jia Aihua
- Directed by: Jia Aihua
- Ending theme: Penguin's Game
- Country of origin: China
- Original language: Chinese
- No. of episodes: 62

Production
- Running time: 18 minutes
- Production companies: Shenzhen Xibei Culture Communication Co., Ltd.

Original release
- Release: January 1, 2006

Project Q Baby (Chinese: Q城宝贝) is a 2005 Chinese animated series directed by Jia Aihua and aired on the Shenzhen TV Children's Channel on January 1, 2006. Focusing on education and popular science, Project Q Baby revolves around the stories of three little pigs in the "Love Manor" (爱心庄园): Dudu Xiucai, Ku Gongzi, and Xiang Meiren. The series was originally planned to have 1,000 episodes, divided into 48 series. Creator Jia Aihua planned to complete the 1,000 episodes over three years, and the blueprint included a total of 168 characters. 62 episodes, totaling 1,116 minutes, have been produced and released. The animation was produced using Flash technology.

== Origin ==
The work originated with Jia Aihua (贾爱华), who, while tutoring her two- and three-year-old son, struggled with a lack of books and audiovisual products that met his needs. She subsequently created dozens of engaging children's stories, which were well received at her son's kindergarten. Having previously worked in television, Jia Aihua envisioned turning the stories into animations and founded her own animation studio in 1999. However, animation production was prohibitively expensive at the time, and even after raising millions of yuan through fundraising and borrowing, she struggled to sustain the project. An audiovisual production company pledged 3.8 million yuan to co-produce the animation, but Jia Aihua ultimately abandoned the project, believing the investors lacked shared ambition. Jia Aihua later raised over 500,000 yuan by writing stories for kindergarten textbooks, producing musicals, and feature films, which she sold to television stations and publishing houses, allowing her to continue her business. The animated series Project Q Baby was completed in 2002, but was delayed. In 2003, thanks to national support policies, the over 1,000-minute series became a hit. On the eve of October 2005, Project Q Baby reached a cooperation with Shenzhen Haitian Publishing House, with the first publishing fee of 2 million yuan.

== Characters ==
Name	Notes
Dudu Xiucai (嘟嘟秀才)	A light green pig, the eldest child, 5-years-old. He wears heart-shaped glasses and overalls. He is very intelligent and the most knowledgeable of the three siblings.
Xiang Meiren (香美人)	A light blue pig, the second child, 4-years-old. Wearing an earring in her right ear. The only girl in the pig family.
Ku Gongzi (酷公子)	A gray pig, the youngest child, 3-years-old. He has a star-shaped mark on his forehead and often wearing T-shirt with a Nike-like logo.
Patton (巴顿)	A fox who wandering the Love Manor and sleep outdoors, 4-years-old. Appeared in episode 45. Wearing a green helmet with only one ear visible. Kindhearted, he greatly admires World War II General George S. Patton. He is also very clean, his catchphrase is "Oh my God!" He was once rejected by Pig Daddy because he thought foxes were cunning creatures, but only after Xiang Meiren clarified that he was not a bad person did he accept him.

== Book of the same name ==
Haitian Publishing House also published a book series titled Project Q Baby, which covers episodes 1 to 20 of the animated series.

#	Title	ISBN
1	香美人尿床了; Xiang Meiren Wet The Bed	9787806976876
2	天上的事情; Things In Sky	9787806976876
3	戴大口罩的香美人; Xiang Meiren Wearing A Big Mask	9787806976876
4	猪儿钓鱼; Pigs Fishing	9787806976876
5	嘟嘟秀才要生小孩; Dudu Xiucai Want To Have A Baby	9787806976876
6	不听话的向日葵; Disobedient Sunflower	9787806976876
7	猪兄弟的运水比赛; Pig Brothers' Water Carrying Competition	9787806976876
8	酷公子差点闯祸; Ku Gongzi Almost Got Into Trouble	9787806976876
9	梦里的事情不是真的吗; Aren't Things In Dream Real?	9787806976876
10	孩子们的妈妈生病了; The Children's Mother Is Sick	9787806976876
11	千万不能乱吃药; Don't Take Medicine Randomly	9787806977958
12	厨房里的安全知识; Safety Knowledge In The Kitchen	9787806977958
13	想念妈妈的夜晚; Nights I Miss Mom	9787806977958
14	猪宝贝们做家务; Pig Babies Doing Housework	9787806977958
15	猪宝贝们要独自住了; The Pig Babies Are Going To Live Alone	9787806977958
16	人为什么会出汗; Why Do People Sweat?	9787806977958
17	猪宝贝设计新房子; Pig Babies Design New Houses	9787806977958
18	会变形状的月亮; The Moon That Changes Shape	9787806977958
19	不要欺负小动物; Don't Bully Small Animals	9787806977958
20	猪宝贝和鸭儿做朋友; Pig Babies And Duck Become Friends	9787806977958
