= Athletic Motivation Inventory =

Questionnaire

The Athletic Motivation Inventory was developed in 1969 by Thomas Tuko, Bruce Ogilvie, and Leland Lyon. It has just under 200 questions and measures the following scales:

- Drive
- Aggression
- Determination
- Responsibility
- Leadership
- Self-confidence
- Emotional control
- Mental toughness
- Coachability
- Conscience
- Trust

There are doubts about its usefulness.
