= Franco Laguna Correa =

Ethnographer and writer (born 1984)

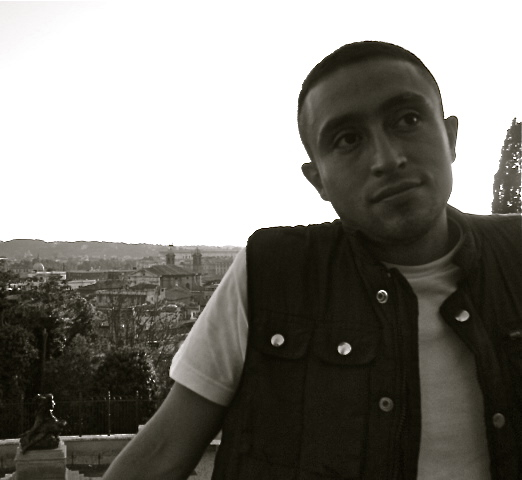
- Born: September 20, 1984 (age 42)
- Occupation: Ethnographer
- Years active: 2008-present

Academic background
- Education: UNC-Chapel Hill; Autonomous University of Madrid; University of Pittsburgh; National Autonomous University of Mexico; Portland State University

Academic work
- Discipline: Cultural Studies, Social Anthropology, Philosophy, Literary Studies.
- Institutions: University of Pittsburgh, University of Denver, High Point University.

Franco Laguna Correa is an ethnographer, writer and cultural theorist, also known for his heteronyms "Francisco Laguna-Correa," "Dr. Crank," "Crank," "Sardine," "f.l Crank," "Gaetano Fonseca" and "Mehmet Amazigh." He has been included by literary critics in the so-called "New Latino Boom," a literary movement that features 21st-century Latin American fiction authors writing in Spanish in the United States. He has contributed to the Oxford Research Encyclopedia of Literature (ORE) with the essay "Brown/Brownness/Mestizaje".

He was awarded in 2012 the National Literary Prize of the North American Academy of the Spanish Language (ANLE), an institution based in New York City. In 2013, he received the International Poetry Prize of the Autonomous University of Aguascalientes. In 2016, Laguna Correa was one of the recipients of The Fuerza Award, a social recognition for his intellectual activism in the Pittsburgh area granted by The City of Pittsburgh, the collective Café con Leche, and The Latin American Cultural Union (LACU). The Chicago Review of Books recommended his book Crush Me (a broken novel) for the 2017 National Poetry Month.

His novel Wild North was included in the list of best Mexican fiction of 2017 and published in the daily newspaper El Informador.

He has been invited to deliver talks about his research at various institutions, including Emory University, the University of California, The University of Leeds, Texas State University, and Duke University.

Besides contributing on a regular basis to the online publications E-International Relations and Forum Nepantla, he is the creator of the online project Cyber~Texts.

== Education and teaching ==
Laguna Correa graduated from the Escuela Nacional Preparatoria in 2001 after being forced to interrupt his studies due to the 1999 UNAM strike. He began his university studies at The School of Philosophy and Letters and The School of Political and Social Sciences of the National Autonomous University of Mexico, which is often cited as the most prestigious university of the Spanish-speaking world.

He completed his undergraduate education at Portland State University, where he received a double BA in Liberal Studies and Literature. In addition, he completed a Master of Fine Arts at the University of Pittsburgh and two M.A. degrees, one in Social Anthropology and another in Philosophy, both at the Autonomous University of Madrid.

He was the recipient in 2014 of the K. Leroy Irvis Fellowship at the University of Pittsburgh, and in 2016 he received a doctoral degree (Ph.D.) in Cultural and Literary Studies from the University of North Carolina at Chapel Hill. He has held researching and teaching appointments at University of North Carolina at Chapel Hill, University of Pittsburgh, High Point University, the University of Denver, and Universidad del Valle de México.

== Theoretical work ==
He has published scholarly works on various subjects, including exile, cognitive approaches to cultural modernity, the implications of neoliberalism in the production of literary texts, postmodernity, subalternity, the intersection of culture and sound, among others. The Routledge Handbook of Latin American Literary Translation (2023) and the A Companion to Multiethnic Literature of the United States (2023) credit Laguna Correa for coining the term "New Latino American", which puts forward the notion that in the United States new Latin American cultural agents are entangled within the framework of global capitalism as producers of cultural artifacts distinct to those produced by traditional Latino communities. He contributed to the re-discovery of the 19-century novella Perico by Arcadio Zentella with his academic article, "Recuperando a "Perico" de Arcadio Zentella como un proyecto subalterno de liberación," published in 2013 by the journal A Contracorriente of North Carolina State University.

=== Selected criticism ===
Encyclopedia entry "Brown/Brownness/Mestizaje" (Oxford Research Encyclopedia of Literature, 2022).

"Portraying Gender and Ethnicity in Black and White in Roma (2018) by Alfonso Cuarón" (PopMeC, 2021).

"Ray Bradbury on War, Recycling, and Artificial Intelligence" (Public Books/JSTOR Daily, 2020).

"Ferdydurke (1937), Les Enfants Terribles (1929), and the Future of Childhood" (Forum Nepantla, 2020).

In Contemporary U.S. Latinx Literature in Spanish: Straddling Identities, essay "The Rise of Latino Americanism: Deterritorialization and Postnational Imagination in New Latino American Writers" (Palgrave Pivot, 2018).

In Volver a México: espacios, medios y poéticas del regreso, essay "Narrando el exilio y la experiencia de retorno de Francisco Zarco: personalidad, encuentros y enfermedad de un liberal mexicano" (El Colegio de San Luis, 2015).

"Recuperando a Perico de Arcadio Zentella como un proyecto subalterno de liberación: limitaciones historiográficas en el siglo XIX mexicano," (A Contracorriente: Journal of Latin American Studies, 2013).

== Selected bibliography ==
Essays
Title	Publisher	Year of Publication	Notes
Esclavitud en Tabasco durante el Porfiriato	Pensamiento Libre	2020	Published with the heteronym "F. Laguna Correa"
La vida después del presente: la irrupción de la inteligencia artificial en la vida cotidiana	Pensamiento Libre	2020	Published with the heteronym "F. Laguna Correa"

Novels
Title	Publisher	Year of Publication
Acedia under the heteronym of "f.l. Crank"	Rayo Press	2020
Ortodoxa	Suburbano Ediciones	2018
Wild North	Rayo Press	2016

Novellas
Title	Publisher	Year of Publication
The Invisible Militia under the heteronym "Dr. Crank"	Radical Narratives	2020
Diario Supino under the heteronym "f.l. Crank"	Rayo Press	2020

Poetry
Title	Publisher	Year of Publication	Notes
Requiem for The Unhappy under the heteronym "f.l. Crank"	Radical Narratives	2020	
Poesía Temprana (2005-2012) under the heteronym "Gaetano Fonseca"	Miglior Fabbro Eds.	2020	
Crush Me: Ría Brava (a broken novel) under the heteronym "f.l. Crank"	Radical Narratives	2017	National Poetry Prize of the University of Aguascalientes

Flash-fictions
Title	Publisher	Year of Publication	Notes
Finales felices	Academia Norteamericana de la Lengua Española	2012	National Literary Award of the North American Academy of the Spanish Language

Short Stories
Title	Publisher	Year of Publication
Historia de un hombre devastado por el siglo XX under the heteronym "F. Laguna Correa"	Rayo Press	2020
Sentencia definitiva under the heteronym "F. Laguna Correa"	Rayo Press	2020
Crítica literaria y otros cuentos	Editorial Paroxismo	2011

Memoir
Title	Publisher	Year of Publication
Portable Museum: Lighter Than Air	Real Time	2020

Hybrid Genres
Title	Publisher	Year of Publication
Pedagogy for (all): Reading Lessons under the heteronym "Dr. Crank"	Thinking Books	2020
The Book Where You Surrender under the heteronym "Dr. Crank"	Radical Narratives	2020
Aphorism(s) under the heteronym "Dr. Crank"	Radical Narratives	2020
Resquebrajadura: deforme y mutilado, este relato	Editorial Paroxismo	2014

== Personal life ==
Franco currently lives in Mexico City, where he works as a legal analyst besides holding a remote interdisciplinary research position at the University of Pittsburgh.
