= Anne Hughes (art patron) =

American gallery owner, restaurateur, and patron of the arts (1944–2021)

- Born: Marguerite Anne McBride; September 21, 1944; Washington, D.C.
- Died: August 26, 2021 (aged 76); Portland, Oregon
- Occupations: Restaurateur, art patron

Anne Hughes (September 21 1944 - August 26 2021) was an American gallery owner, restaurateur and patron of the arts from Portland, Oregon. She originated various enterprises including the Anne Hughes Coffee Room at Powell's bookstore, an eponymous art gallery, and the Kitchen Table Cafe. Mentioned along with Matt Groening, Paul Allen, and Phil Knight, she was described as a "One-Woman KaffeeKlatsch" by Willamette Week as part of the weekly's 25th anniversary celebration in "They Rule: Some of our Favorite Portlanders".

== Personal life ==
Hughes lived in Portland for over 60 years. She had four brothers.

On September 24, 1990, Hughes was arrested along with 51 others during the so-called "Quayle Riot". She was charged with unlawful assembly. The riot began as a demonstration timed to correspond with a visit by then-Vice-President Dan Quayle. She subsequently sued the city, claiming that her constitutional rights were violated when she was hand-cuffed for more than 3 and one half hours, forced to kneel for over an hour and cursed at by police. The suit was subsequently settled and the criminal charges against her were dropped.

In 2016, Hughes was living in a "tiny home", a 400 square-foot house located next door to her son, Michael. She died from the effects of dementia on August 26, 2021.

== Career ==
Hughes was a prominent part of the Portland art scene during the 1970s. Before closing in 1977, the Anne Hughes Gallery operated in Northwest Portland and Downtown Portland. Judy Chicago, Henk Pander, and Mel Katz showed at her gallery. She displayed the work of painters Scott McIntire, Frank Okada, Carolyn Cole, Martha Banyas, Jackie K. Johnson, Sherrie Wolf, Judy Cooke, Carol Colin, jeweler and sculptor Nelsie Davis, artist Bill Ritchie, sculptor William Tunberg, Scott Sonniksen, and Paul Sutinen.

She served on the first board of directors for the Portland Saturday Market.

During the 1980s, Hughes hosted "Wednesday Breakfasts" which were famous for the scones.

The Anne Hughes Coffee Room was started in 1985 at Powell's Books after Hughes gave a written proposal to owner, Michael Powell. Hughes claimed the inspiration came to her after she sat on a box in the stacks and read an entire book. The Coffee Room was famous as a meeting place and for The Anne Hughes Coffee Room Books, a series of blank journals put out by Hughes to be filled in by patrons. Leo Burt, the fugitive believed to be behind the Sterling Hall bombing and one-time Unabomber suspect may have visited the Coffee Room and written in one of the books in 1988.

Hughes operated the Kitchen Table Cafe in Portland's Buckman neighborhood for most of the 1990s. During that time, she was on the board of the Buckman Community Association.

Hughes also worked providing organizing services to small businesses and individuals.
