= Sherrie Wolf =

American photo-realistic painter

Sherrie Wolf is an American photo-realistic painter and printmaker based in Portland, Oregon who has won multiple awards for her work. She has been described as "one of Portland's most prominent artists."

== Early life and education ==
Born in Portland in 1952, Wolf graduated from the Pacific Northwest College of Art (PNCA) in Portland, Oregon where she studied under the printmaker Louis Bunce. She then went to gain a MFA from the Chelsea College of Arts in London, before coming back to Portland in the mid-1970s. Whilst in London, she studied paintings and works by the Old Masters in galleries and museums across Europe, which would later significantly influence her own art. Afterwards, Wolf returned to the PCNA as a teacher to support herself while she began exhibiting her work.

== Work ==
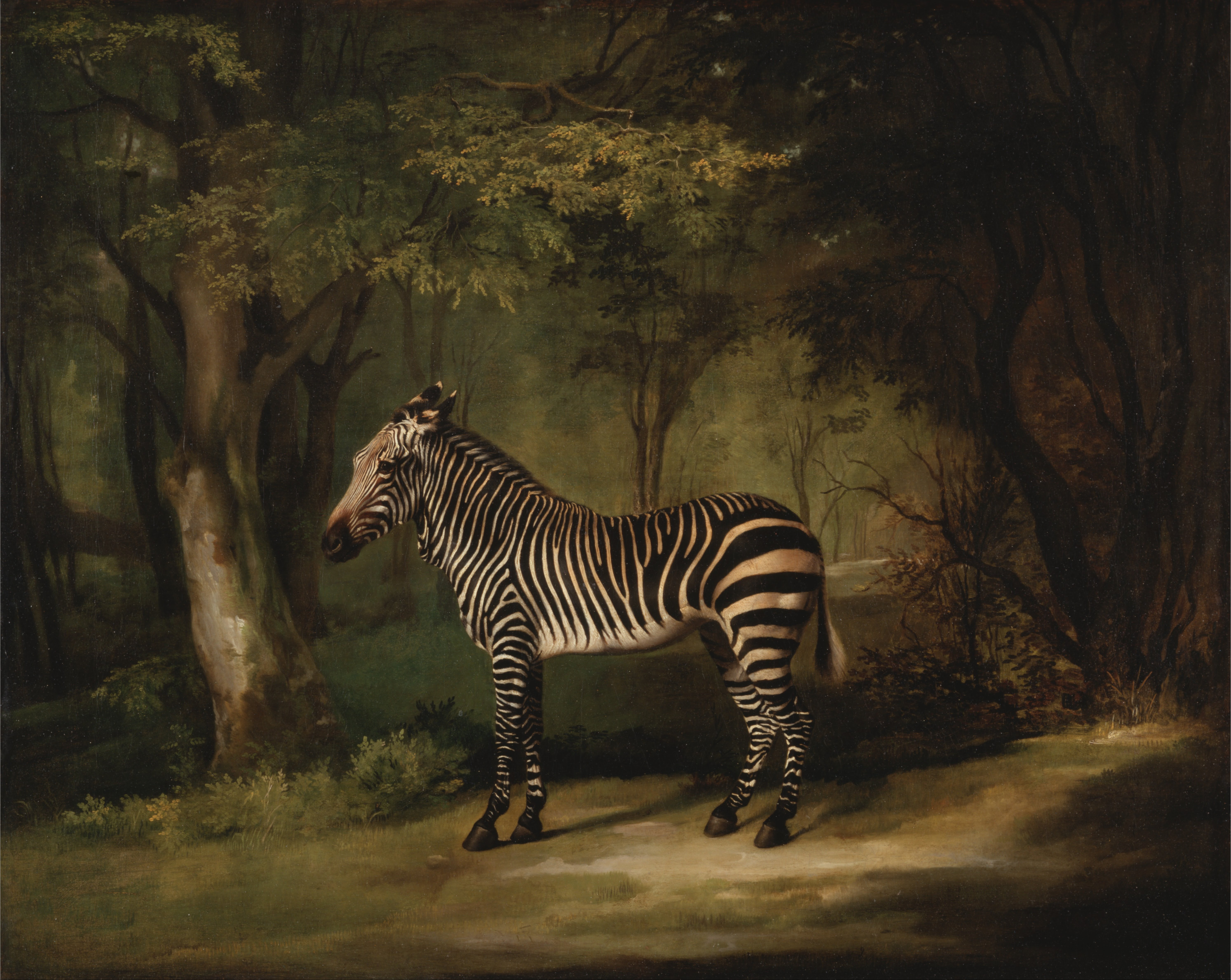
Zebra by George Stubbs

Wolf's work is known for its postmodernism approach of appropriating elements from classical art alongside her own work. She often uses historical art as the background to boldly colored still lives. One commentator noted that by placing realistically portrayed flowers, fruit, and vases of water before reproductions of Vermeer, it was difficult to decide whether the Old Master paintings were to be read as actual backdrop, or simply as paintings used as backgrounds.

An example of Wolf's approach can be seen in her 2011 print, Zebra with Cherry and Fava Bean, which faithfully reproduces an early 1760s painting of a zebra by George Stubbs as the background to an enormous still-life of a cherry and fava bean. Wolf was fascinated by the unintentional surrealism of Stubb's original painting, which placed a realistically portrayed exotic animal in a bucolic British landscape. Her use of the still-life was chosen for texture and color, rather than for narrative or symbolic reasons, and to "reinforce the illusion of a disquieting strangeness." Another example of Wolf's appropriation technique is found in the self-portrait she painted to commemorate her 60th birthday in 2012, a parody of Gustave Courbet's The Painter's Studio. Wolf placed herself in Coubert's position in the painting, and substituted other elements of the 1855 painting for their opposites (such as a cat replacing a dog, and a nude man replacing the female model in Coubert's original).

Until 1994, Wolf had her own printing press in her studio, where she produced etchings alongside her drawings and paintings. Since 1994, her prints have been produced with the fine-art printer Mark Mahaffey of Portland. While she also produces photogravure prints, Wolf prefers the range of color and tone possible with the aquatint technique.

== Exhibitions ==
Solo shows

- Transmissions, The Laura Russo Gallery, Portland, Oregon
- Faces, The Laura Russo Gallery, Portland, Oregon
- New Paintings, Arden Gallery, Boston, Massachusetts
- Gordon Woodside / John Braseth Gallery, Seattle, Washington
- Counterpoint, The Laura Russo Gallery, Portland, Oregon
- Animal Life, Jenkins Johnson Gallery, San Francisco, California

== Awards ==
2000

Oregon Artist Fellowship Award, Oregon Arts Commission

2001

Art About Agriculture, Oregon State University

2002

Regional Arts & Culture Council, Portland, Oregon, Grant for Printmaking Project, The Artemisia Suite

2007

Juror's Choice Award, Blossom: The Art of Flowers, The Susan Kathleen Black Foundation, Houston Museum of Natural Science, Houston, Texas

2011

Finalist, Contemporary Northwest Artists Awards 2011, Portland Art Museum, Arlene and Harold Schnitzer Northwest Artists Collection
