= Scott Davis (businessman) =

American businessman (born 1952)

D. Scott Davis
- Born: 1952 (age 73–74); Medford, Oregon, U.S.
- Education: Portland State University
- Occupation: Businessperson
- Years active: 1974-present
- Employer: United Parcel Service

D. Scott Davis (born 1952 in Medford, Oregon) is an American businessman and former chairman of the board of directors of United Parcel Service, Inc. (UPS). He was the company's chief executive officer until August 30, 2014.

== Biography ==
Davis has a bachelor's degree in accounting from Portland State University and is a certified public accountant. After graduating from college in 1974, he first worked for accounting firm Arthur Andersen. A native of Medford, Oregon, Davis joined UPS in 1986 when the company acquired II Morrow, an Oregon technology company.

Davis completed a term as chairman of the board of the Federal Reserve Bank of Atlanta in 2009. He is also on the board of Honeywell International, Inc., and in 2010, joined the President's Export Council, the principal national advisory committee on international trade.

While CEO of UPS in 2008, his first year in the role, Davis earned a total compensation of $5.2 million, which included a base salary of $960,000 and various bonuses and other compensation. In 2012, he received stock worth $8.7 million as CEO and chairman of UPS, down 7% from the $9.5 million in 2011.

== See also ==
- List of chief executive officers
