= Bruce Ogilvie =

Applied sport psychologist

- Born: 1920; Victoria, British Columbia, Canada
- Died: 2003 (aged 82–83); Los Gatos, California, U.S.
- Education: University of San Francisco; Portland State University; University of London
- Occupation: Sport psychologist

Bruce Ogilvie (1920–2003) was an applied American sport psychologist. Ogilvie is often referred to as the "Father of North American Applied Sport Psychology."

== Clinical psychologists and applied sport psychologists ==
Clinical sport psychologists have training in psychology so that they can detect and treat individuals with emotional disorders. These psychologists also have additional training in sport and exercise psychology and in the sport sciences. Whereas an applied sport psychologist uses their research and findings to help athletes improve their mental game. These psychologists work directly with athletes to help them perform better. Ogilvie was one of the first psychologists to apply treatments to athletes. Because Ogilvie was the first to apply treatments to athletes, Weinberg and Gould state in Foundations of Sport and Exercise Psychology that he is referred to as the "Father of North American Applied Sport Psychology".

== Work ==
In 1966, Ogilvie and fellow psychologist Thomas Tutko wrote Problem Athletes and How to Handle Them. That year, Ogilvie started working directly with competitive athletes.

In the mid-1970s, Ogilvie tested 250 athletes from car racing, skydiving and other risky sports. He found that athletes in risky sports such as these have superior intelligence, emotional stability, and independence compared to those who did not participate in such sports. Ogilvie also determined that athletes in risky sports make concerted efforts to minimize their risks. Ogilvie also found that these athletes shared certain traits. For example, race car drivers were very driven and need to be in control. Drivers are also abnormally sexually active, perhaps to help cope with the stress of their sport.

In another study, Ogilvie says that fifty percent of people don't engage in any activities that cause them to sweat during the week. The study also found that attending a sporting event may not be a passive activity. Ogilvie decided to study the effects of attending a sporting event in person or watching it on TV. He found that watching sports uses many psychological and social skills and that men exude an extreme amount of testosterone while watching sports.

Ogilvie says that attending a sporting event serves as a fantasy escape for people and can be a form of hero modeling. The event gives watchers a sense of social meaning and purpose.

Dr. Ogilvie worked with many accomplished professional sports teams. He advised nine NBA teams, four NFL teams, and six MLB teams, including the Los Angeles Lakers, the New York Mets, the Dallas Cowboys, and the San Francisco 49ers. Ogilve also served as an Olympics consultant for the United States from 1960 until his death in 2003.

== Life ==
Bruce Ogilvie was born in 1920 in Victoria, British Columbia, Canada. Ogilvie met his wife, Eva Diane, in 1938 and married her in 1943. He attended the University of San Francisco and studied psychology and also received his masters from Portland State.

Shortly after his marriage the family moved to London so Ogilvie could pursue his PhD. He received his PhD from the University of London in 1954, in sport psychology. After Ogilvie received his PhD the family moved to Los Gatos, California. Ogilvie then began working at San Jose State University as a professor.

In 1979 he retired from his job at San Jose State. In 2003 Bruce Ogilvie died at his home in Los Gatos.

== See also ==
- Athletic Motivation Inventory
