= Jack Ernest Vincent =

Jack Ernest Vincent (born December 26, 1932, in Portland, Oregon) is a Borah Professor Emeritus of the Department of Political Science at the University of Idaho.

== Education ==
Jack received his Bachelor of Science in General Studies from Portland State College in 1957. He went on to earn his Master's Degree in Political Science from the University of Oregon in 1960. In 1964, still attending the University of Oregon he received his Doctor of Philosophy in Political Science.

== Bibliography ==
- The Handbook of International Relations (New York: Barron's 1969).
- United Nations Handbook (New York: Barron's 1969).
- United Nations Handbook (New York: Barron's, Revised Edition, 1976).
- Understanding International Relations (Washington: University Press of America, 1979).
- International Relations: Law (Washington: University Press of America, 1983).
- International Relations: Structures (Washington: University Press of America, 1983).
- International Relations: United Nations (Washington: University Press of America, 1983).
- The Caucusing Groups of the United Nations: An Examination of Their Attitudes toward the Organization. (Stillwater: Oklahoma State University Press, 1965).
- Factor Analysis in International Relations: Interpretation, Problem Areas and An Application (Gainesville: University of Florida Press, 1971).
- Project Theory: Interpretations and Policy Relevance (Washington: University Press of America, 1979).
- International Relations: Theory (Washington: University Press of America, 1983).
- Support Patterns in the United Nations (Washington: University Press of America, 1983).
