= Carolyn Davidson (graphic designer) =

American graphic designer

- Born: 1943 (age 82–83)
- Education: Portland State University (BA)
- Occupation: Graphic designer
- Years active: 1971–2000
- Notable work: Swoosh logo for Nike, Inc.

Carolyn Davidson (born 1943) is an American graphic designer best known for designing the Nike Swoosh logo.

== Early and current life ==
Little is known about Davidson, who retired in 2000 and has not been found on public social media sites. She was last reported as spending her time quietly out of the spotlight, working on her personal interests after her fame and success relating to the Nike logo.

== Career ==
Davidson designed the Swoosh in 1971 while a graphic design student at Portland State University in Portland, Oregon. She started as a journalism major but switched to design after taking a design course to "fill an empty elective." She attained a bachelor's in graphic design in 1971. Phil Knight, who was teaching an accounting class at the university, overheard Davidson say that she couldn't afford oil painting supplies and asked her to do some work for what was then Blue Ribbon Sports, Inc. (later Nike). Knight offered Davidson a job in creating charts and graphs for his meetings with Japanese footwear executives. Her success with this work led to Davidson designing posters, ads, and flyers for the company. In 1971, Knight and his co-founder needed a logo for a new line of running shoes they were getting ready to introduce. They asked Davidson to design a stripe (industry term for a shoe logo) that "had something to do with movement".

Davidson worked on her ideas by drawing on a piece of tissue over a drawing of a shoe. She gave him five different designs, one of which was the Swoosh which resembles a wing and hints at Nike, the Greek goddess of victory.

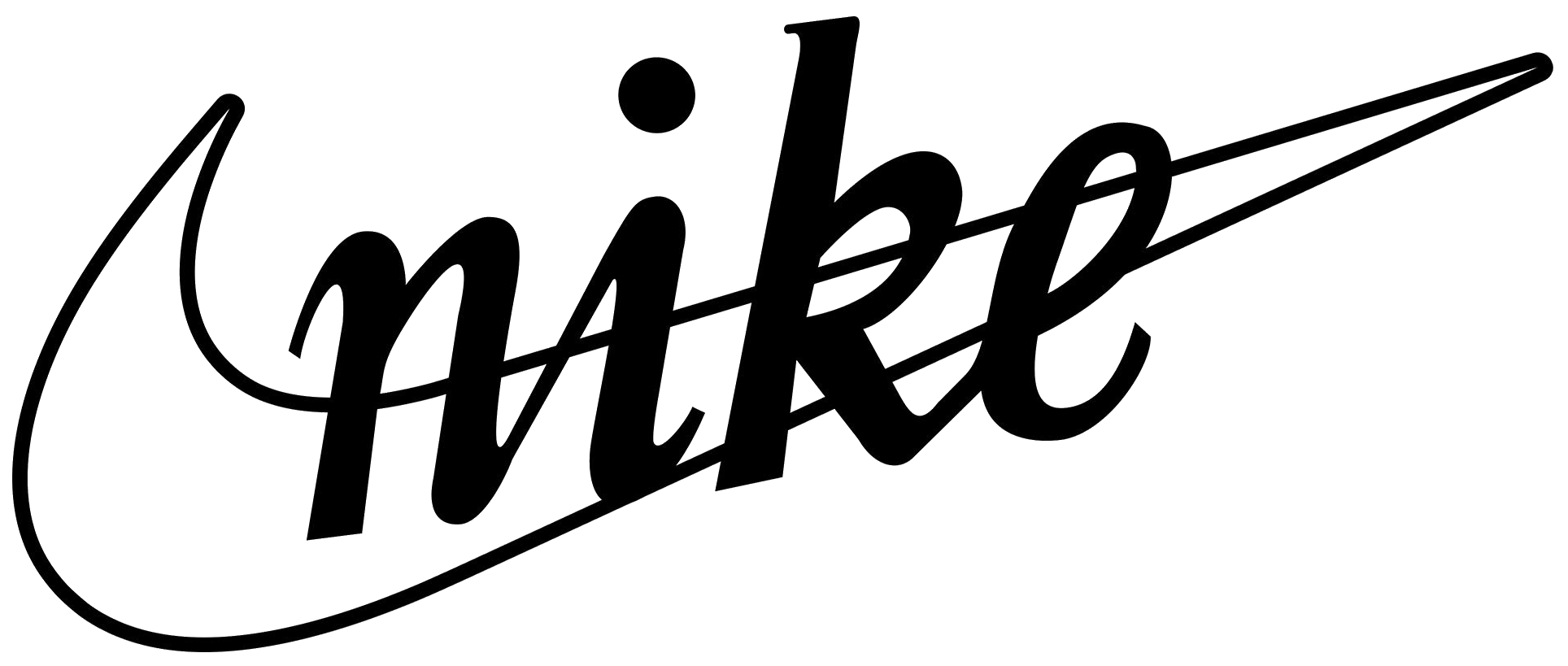
(Left): The original logo designed by Davidson for Nike in 1971, for which she was paid $35. The emblem, with some later revisions (right), has remained as the company logo since then, becoming one of sport's most iconic images.

Needing to choose a logo in order to meet looming production deadlines, Knight settled on the Swoosh after rejecting four other designs by Davidson. At the time, he stated of the logo, "I don't love it, but it will grow on me." For her services, the company paid her $35, equivalent to $278 in 2025. Davidson continued working for Blue Ribbon Sports (it officially became Nike, Inc. in 1972) until the design demands of the growing company exceeded one person's capacity. In 1976, the company hired its first external advertising agency, John Brown and Partners, and Davidson went on to work on other clients' needs.

In September 1983, nearly three years after the company went public, Knight invited Davidson to a company reception. There, he presented her with chocolate swooshes, a diamond ring made of gold and engraved with the Swoosh, and an envelope filled with 500 shares of Nike's share capital, then worth about seventeen cents per share or $85, worth in 2023—after stock splits bringing the total to 32,000 shares—about $3 million. Of the gift, Davidson says, "this was something rather special for Phil to do, because I originally billed him and he paid that invoice." Davidson went on to be known as "The Logo Lady". In 1995, Nike removed the word "Nike" from the logo; the Swoosh now stands alone as the brand's logo.

Davidson retired in 2000, and now engages in hobbies and volunteer work, including weekly duties at the Ronald McDonald House at Legacy Emanuel Hospital & Health Center in Oregon.
