= Lee D. Baker =

American anthropologist

- Born: Lee D. Baker; January 1, 1966 (age 60); San Diego County, California, U.S.
- Education: Portland State University (BS); Temple University (MA, PhD)
- Scientific career
- Fields: Anthropology, Africana studies, African-American studies
- Workplaces: Duke University
- Thesis: Anthropology and the Construction of Race, 1896–1954 (1994)

Lee D. Baker is an American cultural anthropologist, author, and Duke University faculty member. He is the Mrs. A. Hehmeyer Professor of Cultural Anthropology, African & African-American Studies, and Sociology. He served as Duke's dean of academic affairs and associate vice provost from 2008 to 2016. He taught at Columbia University from 1997 to 2000. Baker has authored two books and more than sixty academic articles, reviews, and chapters related to cultural anthropology, among other fields.

== Early life and education ==
Baker was born in San Diego, California, and was raised in Corvallis, Oregon. In his teen years, Baker began to "study and learn about the black experience" as he grappled with his own sense of racial identity. Portland at the time was a site of crack cocaine addiction and gang violence, particularly prevalent in the black community. During an exchange program in Australia, Baker was alarmed to observe similar problems affecting Aboriginal Australians, who were "nothing like the black folks [he] knew in the United States." Baker realized that despite their differences, Aboriginal Australians and African Americans had a significant commonality: they were blacks in a white-dominated democracy. Full of questions about society and culture, Baker decided to study anthropology.

Baker attended Portland State University, where he earned a Bachelor of Science in anthropology and a certificate in Black studies in 1989. He went on to Temple University in Philadelphia to pursue graduate research. In Philadelphia, Baker found himself within a different community than he was used to in Portland. "It was good," he recalls, "to be around a lot of really hardworking, smart, attractive people who wanted to make a difference. I was not a minority, in a sense; I was just among a lot of different people trying the same thing." At Temple, his doctoral advisor was Thomas C. Patterson, who supported Baker's focus on the history of anthropology. Baker completed his thesis, Anthropology and the Construction of Race, 1896–1954, in 1994.

== Career overview ==
After receiving his PhD, Baker became an assistant professor of cultural anthropology at Duke University between the years of 1995 and 1997. He then went on to teach at Columbia University as an assistant professor of anthropology and African-American studies from 1997 to 1999, becoming an associate professor at Columbia from 1999 to 2000. For the next ten years, from 2000 to 2010, Baker was an associate professor of cultural anthropology, sociology, and African & African-American studies at Duke University. In 2008, Baker became the Dean of Academic Affairs of Duke's Trinity College of Arts and Sciences, about which he said, "I look forward to building on the successes of the past to create new opportunities for the future." In 2010, he became a professor of cultural anthropology and African and African-American studies as well as the Associate Vice Provost for Undergraduate Education.

Throughout his career, Baker has received a long list of grants and fellowships, including the Andrew W. Mellon Postdoctoral Fellowship from Johns Hopkins University, a pre-doctoral fellowship at The W.E.B. Du Bois Institute for Afro-American Research from Harvard University, and, most recently, a grant to support the Mellon/Mays Undergraduate Fellowship Program from the Mellon Foundation. Baker has had scores of publications, including three books (two as an author and one as an editor), numerous articles, book chapters, and over 50 invited lectures. He has been the recipient of awards such as the Richard K. Lublin Distinguished Award for Teaching Excellence (2007) from Duke University and the Benjamin N. Duke Fellow (2003) from the [National Humanities Center]. Baker has been on twenty-five committees, councils, and panels. From 1999 to 2003, Baker was an appointed member of the [American Anthropological Association] (AAA) Centennial Commission and, from 2005 to 2007, he was appointed the AAA Commission on Governance. Baker became the chair of the Allocations Committee of the AAA Committee on the Future of Print and Electronic Publishing. In 2013, Baker was awarded the Prize for Distinguished Achievement in the Critical Study of North America by the Society for the Anthropology of North America.

== Anthropological research ==
Baker seeks to understand how countries whose overarching narrative is about equality, justice, and democracy can have such inequality. He sees confluence between African-American studies, American Indian studies, and other indigenous studies. Much of Baker's work has been centered on contextualizing these concepts in historical terms. Although not a historian, Baker has often aimed to historicize anthropological theories and critically analyze them, particularly with regard to race and African-American studies. Within his more extensive works, as well as many articles, reviews, and essays, Baker has often used both contemporary and past anthropologists' work as the subject of his research. In particular, he has examined the work of famous thinkers such as Franz Boas.

=== Critique of Boas ===
In Baker's view, the major contribution of Boas came with his repudiation of scientific racism. Boas delineated previously blurred lines between race, culture, and linguistics and by doing so was able to argue against the comparative method used to support theories of racial inequality. Although Baker regards Boas as influential in helping shape American ideas of racial equality, Baker has devoted much of his work to critiquing Boas' ideas. In an interview with former American Anthropological Association President, Virginia R. Domínguez, Baker expressed some of his views on Boasian ideology. "One thing that still intrigues me [about Boas] is the built-in contradictions on his understanding or promotion of ideas of culture. Here was a guy who was very articulate and understood the value and the role that culture plays in people's everyday lives, but, for Jews as well as African Americans, he thought amalgamation was the most effective approach for making an effective America. He was not a pluralist or a multiculturalist, like people think."

Baker has written a number of scholarly articles and essays about this critique and other information concerning Boas, including, but not limited to: "The Location of Franz Boas Within the African American Struggle" (1994), "Unraveling the Boasian Discourse: The Racial Politics of 'Culture' in School Desegregation" (1998), "Franz Boas Out of the Ivory Tower" (2004), and "Franz Boas and his 'Conspiracy' to Destroy the White Race" (2010). In a July 2000 interview on PBS, Baker discussed Boas's work in the U.S. and the way in which his work was used by W. E. B. Du Bois and the NAACP.

== Published works ==
Baker's writings have appeared in various scholarly publications, including The Atlanta Journal, Teaching Anthropology, Transforming Anthropology, Voice of Black Studies, The Chronicle of Higher Education, American Journal of Sociology, Journal of Blacks in Higher Education, Anthropology News, and The Journal of Applied Behavioral Science. He wrote the entry on Franz Boas in the International Encyclopedia of the Social Sciences (2008).

In addition, Baker has written for news publications such as the New York Times and Raleigh News and Observer. In July 2006, Baker published an op-ed in The Herald-Sun about a hate crime in Middlesex, North Carolina, in which a cross was burned in a black family's yard.

=== From Savage to Negro (1998) ===
Baker's book From Savage to Negro: Anthropology and the Construction of Race, 1896–1954 was published by the University of California Press in 1998 and was widely reviewed. The publisher's description of the book reads, in part:

Lee D. Baker explores what racial categories mean to the American public and how these meanings are reinforced by anthropology, popular culture, and the law. Focusing on the period between two landmark Supreme Court decisions—Plessy v. Ferguson (the so-called "separate but equal" doctrine established in 1896) and Brown v. Board of Education (the public school desegregation decision of 1954)—Baker shows how racial categories change over time).

A major theme of the book is the historical contextualization of ideas about racial inequality in the United States throughout the early 20th century. Baker also examines key individuals and events that shaped social and anthropological views on race in the decades leading up that period. Like many of his other works, From Savage to Negro emphasizes the importance of figures such as Franz Boas, W. E. B. Du Bois, and Booker T. Washington, examining how their work was linked and how they were integral in changing conceptions of race in the US. Baker also analyzes landmark court cases along with influential organizations such as the National Association for the Advancement of Colored People (NAACP).

In his review of From Savage to Negro, Gerard Fergerson wrote "Baker's study forges new intellectual and political ground" and "enables us to critique the historical relation between race and applied social science."

Vernon J. Williams, Jr., of Purdue University, called From Savage to Negro an "excellent" book that "demonstrat[es] anthropology's influence on American popular culture, through such examples as world's fairs, popular monthlies, and the 'New Negro' movement, on political trends."

Leonard Lieberman, writing in Social Forces, said that From Savage to Negro "belongs on the reading list for courses on the sociology of science, the history of anthropological theory, sociological theory, and advanced courses in race and ethnic relations. It should be required reading for instructors of these courses and would enrich all instructors of introductory courses."

=== Anthropology and the Racial Politics of Culture (2010) ===
Baker's Anthropology and the Racial Politics of Culture was published in 2010 by Duke University Press. In his introduction to the book, Baker writes: "My hope is that these stories will help to delimit the limits, understand the contradictions, and offer a better understanding of the terms and conditions of race and culture which are employed within explicitly political projects that get woven into the fabric of North American culture and become part of American history."

The narratives that unfold in the book include stories about specific anthropologists and sociocultural phenomena such as the Harlem Renaissance Movement, and the 1893 World's Columbian Exposition. Baker's book explores the intricate connections shared among these people and events, and the impacts they have made on shaping American ideas of race and culture. He addresses the different ways in which individuals such as Franz Boas, Frederic W. Putnam, Alice M. Bacon, and Daniel G. Brinton have either accepted or spurned anthropological notions of race and culture. Baker's work in Anthropology and the Racial Politics of Culture was not exclusive to analysis of African and African-American culture. The book has a strong emphasis on the history of racial inequality concerning Native American culture as well.

Like Baker's first book, Anthropology and the Racial Politics of Culture was widely reviewed. Brett Williams, professor at American University, wrote, "The book is rich with wonderful stories, again marking Baker's signature engaging style and making it a great read."

In a review published in American Studies, Vernon J. Williams, Jr., wrote: "Written with an ironic sense of humor, Baker succeeds in ferreting out little known material and enhances and broadens our understanding of the history of anthropology as well as the discipline's relationship to past and present political currents."
