= Musse Olol =

Somali-American engineer and social activist

Musse Olol موسى العالول
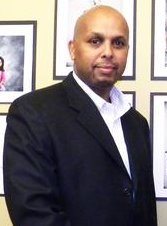
- Born: Mogadishu, Somalia
- Education: Portland State University
- Occupations: Engineer, activist
- Title: Chairman of Somali American Council of Oregon

Musse Olol (Somali: Muuse Olool, Arabic: موسى العالول), also known as Muse A. Olol Diinle, is a Somali-American engineer and social activist. He is the Chairman of the Somali American Council of Oregon (SACOO).

== Background ==
=== Early years ===
Olol was born and raised in Mogadishu, the capital of Somalia. He later emigrated to Oregon in the United States, where he would live for the next 30 years. He eventually became an American citizen.

=== Education ===
For his post-secondary education, Olol attended the local Portland State University. There, he earned a degree in mechanical engineering.

== Career ==
Olol is an engineer by profession. He specializes in water and wastewater engineering.

Olol is noted for his social work with the Somali American Council of Oregon (SACOO), serving as its Chairman and official spokesperson. His duties with the organization include volunteering as a counselor, facilitator, interpreter and co-sponsor. SACOO offers guidance to new Somali families and works closely with state and federal authorities to strengthen civic relations.

Olol is a graduate of the FBI's Citizens Academy.

== Awards ==
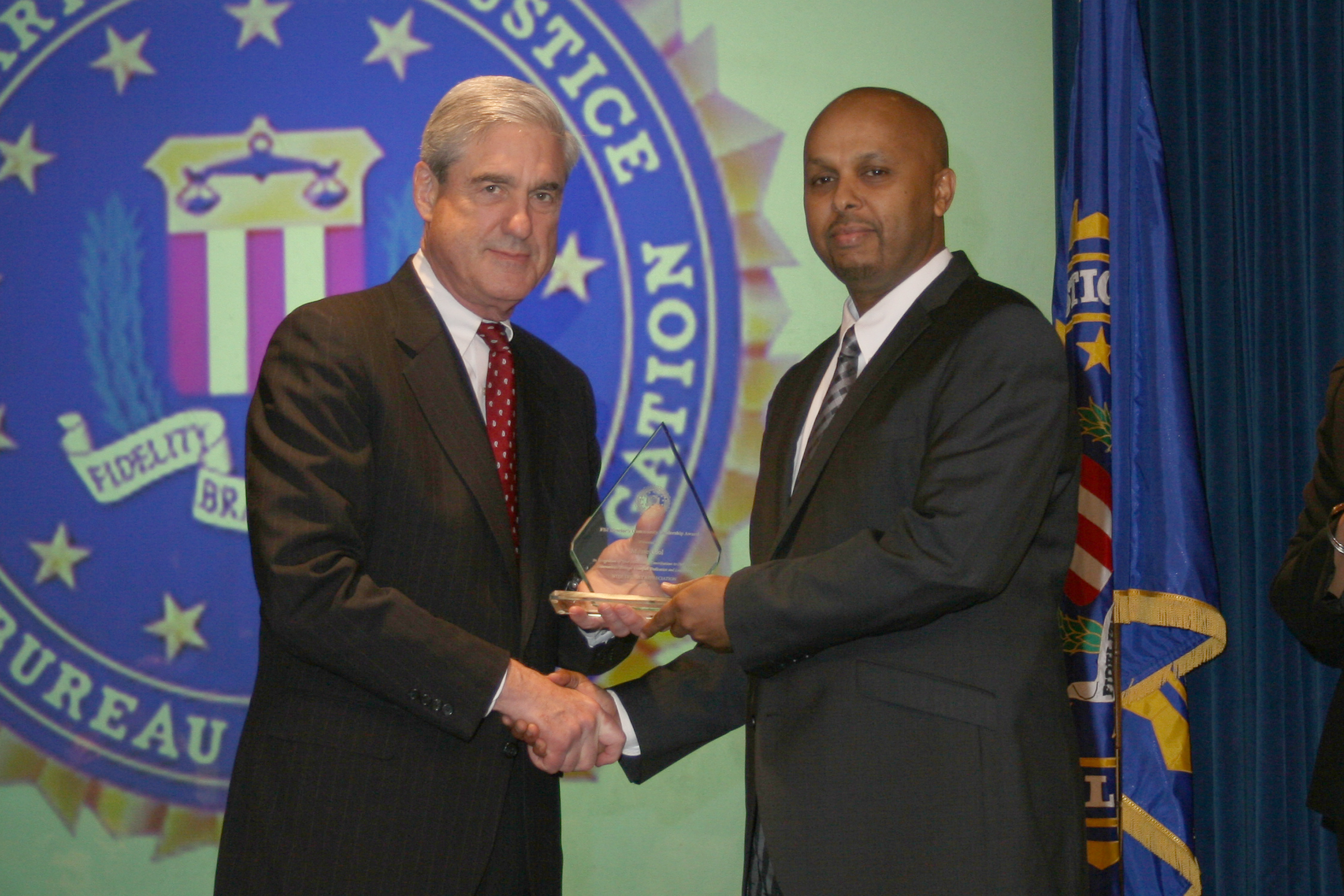
Olol receiving the 2011 Director's Community Leadership Award (DCLA) from FBI Director Robert Mueller

For his many contributions to the Somali community through SACOO, Olol was presented in Washington, D.C., with the FBI's 2011 Director's Community Leadership Award (DCLA). The prize is issued annually to individuals or groups that have earned distinction through service to society.

In 2014, Olol was named one of the 31 Arab Americans Who Have Had an Impact on America by Thrival Room.
