= Swoosh =

Nike logo

The "Swoosh" logo

The Swoosh is the logo of American sportswear designer and retailer Nike. It is one of the most recognizable brand logos in the world, and among the most valuable. As of 2025, the Nike brand was worth $90 billion.

Bill Bowerman and Phil Knight founded Nike on January 25, 1964, as Blue Ribbon Sports (BRS). Upon changing its name to Nike, Inc. on May 30, 1971, the company adopted the Swoosh as its official logo the same year. Carolyn Davidson, a student at Portland State University during the time Knight taught there, created the logo, attempting to convey motion in its design.

The logo has undergone minor changes from its original design in 1971, today most commonly seen as a solo swoosh, although for much of its history, the logo incorporated the NIKE name alongside the Swoosh.

The Swoosh has appeared alongside the trademark "Just Do It" since 1988. Together, these two make up the core of Nike's brand, and has been the face of the company, with many high-profile athletes and sports teams around the world sporting the logos.

== History ==
The Nike Swoosh corporate trademark was created in 1971 by Carolyn Davidson while she was a graphic design student at Portland State University. Davidson started as a journalism major but switched to design after taking a design course to "fill an empty elective." She attained a bachelor in graphic design in 1971. It was here that she met Phil Knight, who was at the time teaching accounting classes at the university. Knight had overheard that Davidson was in search of extra funds for her to take oil painting classes, so he offered to pay Davidson to do some freelance work for his company, then named Blue Ribbon Sports (BRS). Knight offered to pay Davidson $2 per hour (equivalent to $16 per hour in 2025) for the work that she completed. For seven years after its founding in 1964, BRS primarily imported Onitsuka Tiger brand running shoes from Japan. In 1971, Knight decided to launch his own brand of shoes, which would first appear as cleated shoes for football or soccer, and had a factory in Mexico ready to make the shoes. All Knight needed was a "stripe"—the industry term for a shoe logo—to go with his new brand, so he approached Davidson for design ideas. He had asked Davidson to make sure the stripe conveyed motion and did not look similar to the three stripes of Adidas. Over the ensuing weeks, she created at least a half-dozen marks and gathered them together to present to Knight, Bob Woodell and Jeff Johnson (two BRS executives) at the company's home office, at the time, it was located in Tigard, Oregon.

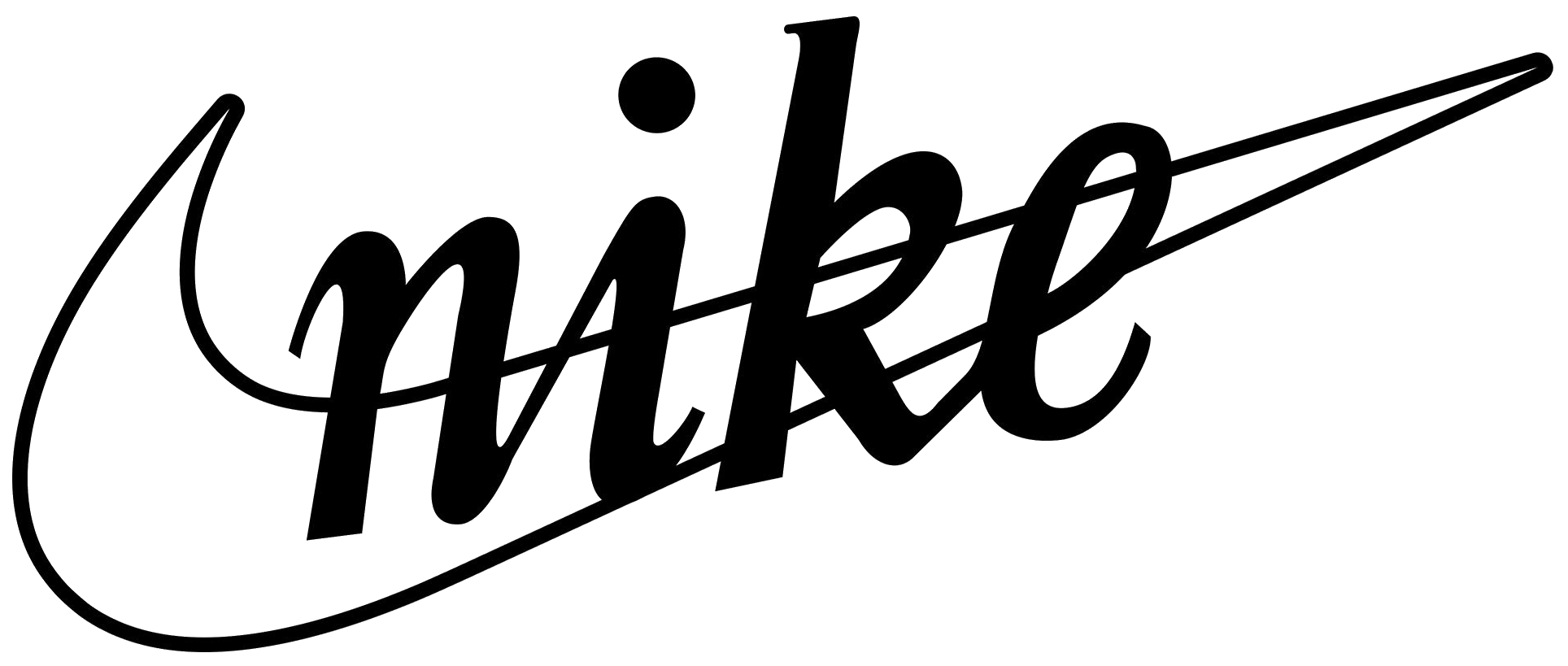
The logo designed by Davidson for Nike in 1971, for which she was paid $35. The emblem, with some later revisions, has remained as the company logo since then, becoming one of sport's most iconic images.

They ultimately selected the mark now known globally as the Swoosh, a shape inspired by the wings of the Greek goddess Nike. "Well, I don't love it", Knight told her, "but maybe it will grow on me." Once the choice was made, Davidson asked for more time to refine the work she had done on the Swoosh; however, Knight stated that the company had production deadlines to meet and needed the logo as soon as possible. For her services, the company paid her $35 (equivalent to $278 in 2025) citing that she worked 17.5 hours on creating the Swoosh, although Davidson said that she is certain she worked more hours on the design. The Swoosh was officially trademarked on June 18, 1971 and in June 1972, at the U.S. Track and Field Olympic Trials in Eugene, Oregon, Nike's first official track shoe, the Nike Cortez, was released to the athletes sporting the new Swoosh.

Davidson continued working for Blue Ribbon Sports (it officially became Nike, Inc. in 1972) until the design demands of the growing company exceeded one person's capacity. In 1976, the company hired its first external advertising agency, John Brown and Partners, and Davidson went on to work on other clients' needs. In September 1983, Knight gave Davidson a golden Swoosh ring with an embedded diamond and 500 shares of Nike stock (which have since split into 32,000 shares) to express his gratitude. Of the gift, Davidson says, "this was something rather special for Phil to do, because I originally billed him and he paid that invoice." Davidson went on to be known as "The Logo Lady". She said that she is not a millionaire but lives comfortably. Davidson retired in 2000 and now engages in hobbies and volunteer work, including at the Ronald McDonald House at Legacy Emanuel Hospital & Health Center in Oregon.

== Design and color ==
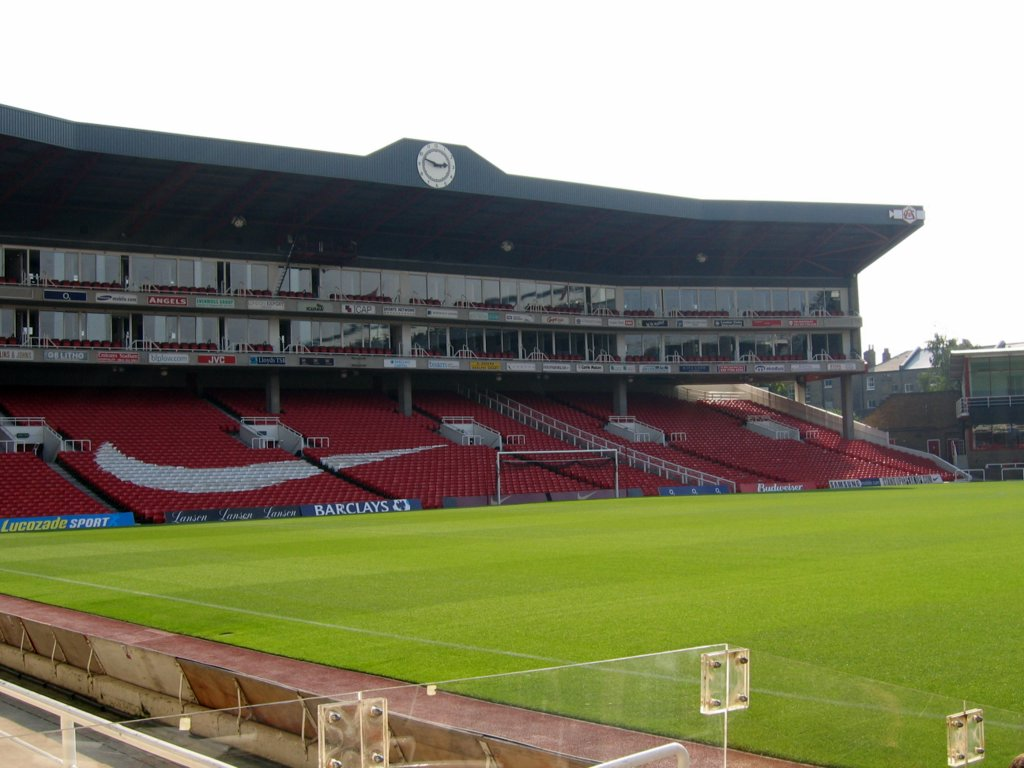
The logo at the former Highbury Stadium, London

Nike co-founder Phil Knight was adamant that his company's new logo be a simple design that is fluid and conveys motion and speed. The logo is also said to symbolize the wing of the Greek goddess of victory, Nike.

When first released, the design was displayed in a variety of colors to stand out on the track from other shoe manufacturers. Nike primarily used the red and white color palette on its logo for much of its history. The red is meant to exemplify passion, energy, and joy, while the white color represents nobility, charm and purity.

Until 1995, the official Nike corporate logo for Nike featured the name "NIKE" in Futura Bold, all-caps font, cradled within the Swoosh.

== Brand image ==
One of the most recognized logos in the world, the Nike brand was valued at $26 billion in 2015. Nike spends about 10% of its annual revenue on advertising and promotions. Harvard Business School professor Stephen A. Greyser has described the logo as "the living, vibrant symbol of the firm".

Nike has prominently featured the Swoosh logo in its advertising. The endorsements of Romanian tennis player Ilie Năstase and distance runner Steve Prefontaine kicked off Nike's brand sponsorships; today hundreds of athletes endorse the company. Nike's contracts with Michael Jordan, LeBron James and Kobe Bryant in basketball, Shane Warne (until 2001) in cricket, Cathy Freeman in athletics, Cristiano Ronaldo in football, Tiger Woods in golf, and Roger Federer (until 2018) and Rafael Nadal in tennis are among the largest athlete endorsement deals in sports history.

== Nike's heritage ==
Nike is the winged goddess of victory in Greek mythology, who sat at the side of Zeus in Olympus. Nike is said to have presided over history's earliest battlefields as she flew around rewarding the victors with glory and fame, symbolized by a wreath of leaves. She was often found next to the goddess of wisdom, Athena, who is said to never put up with defeat.

In statues and paintings Nike is represented as a woman with wings dressed in a flowing robe, with a wreath in her outstretched hand. To represent her role as the messenger of victory, she is shown with the staff of Hermes. In Athens, the statue of Nike is portrayed without wings and is called Nike Apteron (Wingless Victory). Nike's wings were removed from the statue so she would not fly away, as the Athenians believed doing so would indicate her permanent stay in the city. A sculpture of Nike at Ephesus is said to contain the Swoosh in the flowing dress, but there is no evidence this is the origin of the design.

== Lawsuits ==
In 2006, Lorillard (the previous owner of Newport) and Nike sued graphic designer Ari Saal Forman after he released his Ari Menthol 10s shoes, which combined the design of the Nike Air Force 1 with Newport's spinnaker and colors. According to Forman, the shoes were "dedicated to the two brands who have taken the most and given the least." As a result of the lawsuit, Forman is not legally allowed to own a pair of Menthol 10s.

In 2021, Nike sued the art collective MSCHF for the "Satan Shoes", a modified version of Nike Air Max 97 with explicitly Satanic imagery. Nike claimed trademark infringement and that its brand was being erroneously linked to Satanism. A US district judge ruled that the modified shoes could not be sold.
