= High jump at the NCAA Division I Indoor Track and Field Championships =

The high jump has been held at the NCAA Division I Indoor Track and Field Championships annually since 1965. The women's competition began in 1983.

== Winners ==
Key
A=Altitude assisted

Women's high jump winners
Year	Athlete	Team	Mark
1983	Disa Gisladottir	Alabama Crimson Tide	1.88m 6–2
1984	Mary Moore	Washington State Cougars	1.83m 6–0
1985	Mary Moore	Washington State Cougars	1.90m 6–3
1986	Katrena Johnson	Arizona Wildcats	1.85m 6-¾
1987	Lisa Bernhagen	Stanford Cardinal	1.91m 6-3¼
1988	Angie Bradburn	Texas Longhorns	1.88m 6–2
1989	Paula John	Weber State Wildcats	1.83m 6–0
1990	Sissy Cotner	Auburn Tigers	1.88m 6–2
1991	Tanya Hughes	Arizona Wildcats	1.88m 6–2
1992	Natasha Alleyne	Georgia Tech Yellow Jackets	1.89m 6-2¼
1993	JC Broughton	Arizona Wildcats	1.92m 6-3½
1994	Amy Acuff	UCLA Bruins	1.89m 6-2¼
1995	Amy Acuff	UCLA Bruins	1.97m 6-5½
1996	Najuma Fletcher	Pittsburgh Panthers	1.85m 6-¾
1997	Amy Acuff	UCLA Bruins	1.91m 6-3¼
1998	Erin Aldrich	Texas Longhorns	1.94m 6-4¼
1999	Erin Aldrich	Texas Longhorns	1.92m 6-3½
2000	Dora Gyorffy	Harvard Crimson	1.94m 6-4¼
2001	Kart Siilats	Harvard Crimson	1.85m 6-¾
2002	Darnesha Griffith	UCLA Bruins	1.85m 6-¾
2003	Nevena Lendel	SMU Mustangs	1.89m 6-2¼
2004	Chaunte Howard	Georgia Tech Yellow Jackets	1.92m 6-3½
2005	Chaunte Howard	Georgia Tech Yellow Jackets	1.92m 6-3½
2006	Sheena Gordon	North Carolina Tar Heels	1.86m 6-1¼
2007	Patty Sylvester	Georgia Bulldogs	1.89m 6-2¼
2008	Ebba Jungmark	Washington State Cougars	1.89m 6-2¼
2009	Destinee Hooker	Texas Longhorns	1.98m 6-6
2010	Liz Patterson	Arizona Wildcats	1.93m
2011	Brigetta Barrett	Arizona Wildcats	1.90m
2012	Brigetta Barrett	Arizona Wildcats	1.96m
2013	Brigetta Barrett	Arizona Wildcats	1.95m
2014	Leontia Kallenou	Georgia Bulldogs	1.87m A
2015	Leontia Kallenou	Georgia Bulldogs	1.93m
2016	Akela Jones	Kansas State Wildcats	1.87m
2017	Mady Fagan	Georgia Bulldogs	1.93m
2018	Nicole Greene	North Carolina Tar Heels	1.87m
2019	Zarriea Willis	Texas Tech Red Raiders	1.87m
2021	Tyra Gittens	Texas A&M Aggies	1.90m
2022	Lamara Distin	Texas A&M Aggies	1.92m
2023	Lamara Distin	Texas A&M Aggies	1.91m A
2024	Rachel Glenn	Arkansas Razorbacks	2.00m
2025	Temitope Adeshina	Texas Tech Red Raiders	1.94m
2026	Temitope Adeshina	Texas Tech Red Raiders	1.97m

Men's high jump winners
Year	Athlete	Team	Mark
1965	Frank Costello	Maryland Terrapins	2.08m 6–10
1966	Otis Burrell	Nevada Wolf Pack	2.13m 7–0
1967	Ted Downing	Miami RedHawks	2.13m 7–0
1968	Dick Fosbury	Oregon State Beavers	2.13m 7–0
1969	Ron Jourdan	Florida Gators	2.15m 7-¾
1970	Ken Lundmark	BYU Cougars	2.13m 7–0
1971	Pat Matzdorf	Wisconsin Badgers	2.18m 7–2
1972	Chris Dunn	Colgate Raiders	2.20m 7-2¾
1973	Chris Dunn	Colgate Raiders	2.18m 7–2
1974	Mike Fleer	Oregon State Beavers	2.18m 7–2
1975	Greg Joy	UTEP Miners	2.18m 7–2
1976	Dwight Stones	Long Beach State Beach	2.21m 7–3
1977	Greg Joy	UTEP Miners	2.22m 7-3¼
1978	Franklin Jacobs	Fairleigh Dickinson Knights	2.26m 7–5
1979	Jim Pringle	Florida Gators	2.24m 7-4¼
1980	Franklin Jacobs	Fairleigh Dickinson Knights	2.24m 7-4¼
1981	Leo Williams	Navy Midshipmen	2.27m 7-5¼
1982	Leo Williams	Navy Midshipmen	2.28m 7-5¾
1983	Brian Stanton	Houston Cougars	2.29m 7–6
1984	Nick Saunders	Boston University Terriers	2.27m 7-5¼
1985	Brian Tietjens	Iowa State Cyclones	2.26m 7–5
1986	James Lott	Texas Longhorns	2.26m 7–5
1987	James Lott	Texas Longhorns	2.29m 7–6
1988	Hollis Conway	Louisiana Ragin' Cajuns	2.30m 7-6½
1989	Hollis Conway	Louisiana Ragin' Cajuns	2.37m 7-9¼
1990	Brian Brown	Northwestern State Demons	2.34m 7–8
1991	Tom Barton	George Mason Patriots	2.30m 7-6½
1992	Tom Lange	LSU Tigers	2.30m 7-6½
1993	Percell Gaskins	Kansas State Wildcats	2.27m 7-5¼
1994	Randy Jenkins	Tennessee Volunteers	2.31m 7-7
1995	Petar Malesev	Nebraska Cornhuskers	2.24m 7-4¼
1996	Michael Roberson	McNeese State Cowboys	2.26m 7–5
1997	Eric Bishop	North Carolina Tar Heels	2.29m 7–6
1998	Kenny Evans	Arkansas Razorbacks	2.29m 7–6
1999	Mark Boswell	Texas Longhorns	2.31m 7-7
2000	Mark Boswell	Texas Longhorns	2.33m 7-7¾
2001	Charles Clinger	Weber State Wildcats	2.26m 7–5
2002	Tora Harris	Princeton Tigers	2.26m 7–5
2003	Adam Shunk (Note: Jerrick Holmes of the Cal State Northridge Matadors track and field team originally won in 2.23 m, but he was later declared ineligible.)	North Carolina Tar Heels	2.20m 7-2½
2004	Andra Manson	Texas Longhorns	2.23m 7-3¾
2005	Jesse Williams	USC Trojans	2.26m 7–5
2006	Jesse Williams	USC Trojans	2.29m 7–6
2007	Donald Thomas	Auburn Tigers	2.33m 7-7¾
2008	Dusty Jonas	Nebraska Cornhuskers	2.31m 7-7
2009	Scott Sellers	Kansas State Wildcats	2.25m 7-4½
2010	Derek Drouin	Indiana Hoosiers	2.28m
2011	Derek Drouin	Indiana Hoosiers	2.33m
2012	Nick Ross	Arizona Wildcats	2.23m
2013	Derek Drouin	Indiana Hoosiers	2.35m
2014	James Harris	Florida State Seminoles	2.32m A
2015	JaCorian Duffield	Texas Tech Red Raiders	2.29m
2016	Trey Culver	Texas Tech Red Raiders	2.23m
2017	Trey Culver	Texas Tech Red Raiders	2.26m
2018	Randall Cunningham II	USC Trojans	2.29m
2019	Shelby McEwen	Alabama Crimson Tide	2.29m
2021	JuVaughn Harrison	LSU Tigers	2.30m
2022	Vernon Turner	Oklahoma Sooners	2.32m
2023	Romaine Beckford	South Florida Bulls	2.24m A
2024	Romaine Beckford	Arkansas Razorbacks	2.27m
2025	Tyus Wilson	Nebraska Cornhuskers	2.28m
2026	Tito Alofe	Harvard Crimson	2.24m
