= Shot put at the NCAA Division I Indoor Track and Field Championships =

The shot put has been held at the NCAA Division I Indoor Track and Field Championships annually since 1965. The women's competition began in 1983.

== Winners ==
Key
A=Altitude assisted

Women's shot put winners
Year	Athlete	Team	Mark
1983	Meg Ritchie	Arizona Wildcats	17.37m 56-11¾
1984	Regina Cavanaugh	Rice Owls	16.66m 54–8
1985	Regina Cavanaugh	Rice Owls	16.50m 54-1¾
1986	Regina Cavanaugh	Rice Owls	17.67m 57-11¾
1987	Pam Dukes	Stanford Cardinal	17.40m 57–1
1988	Angela Baker	East Tennessee State Buccaneers	16.27m 53-4½
1989	Carla Garrett	Arizona Wildcats	16.48m 54–1
1990	Tracie Millett	UCLA Bruins	15.82m 51–11
1991	Tracie Millett	UCLA Bruins	16.54m 54-3¼
1992	Dawn Dumble	UCLA Bruins	17.36m 56-11½
1993	Danyel Mitchell	LSU Lady Tigers	16.91m 55-5¾
1994	Elieen Vanisi	Texas Longhorns	17.72m 58-1¾
1995	Dawn Dumble	UCLA Bruins	17.59m 57-8½
1996	Valeyta Althouse	UCLA Bruins	17.65m 57–11
1997	Tressa Thompson	Nebraska Cornhuskers	17.98m 59–0
1998	Teri Cantwell	SMU Mustangs	18.42m 60-5¼
1999	Marika Tuliniemi	SMU Mustangs	16.74m 54-11¼
2000	Seilala Sua	UCLA Bruins	17.27m 56–8
2001	Christina Tolson	UCLA Bruins	17.01m 55-9¾
2002	Cleopatra Borel	UMBC Retrievers	17.50m 57–5
2003	Laura Gerraughty	North Carolina Tar Heels	18.06m 59–3
2004	Laura Gerraughty	North Carolina Tar Heels	19.15m 62–10
2005	Kim Barrett	Miami Hurricanes	18.10m 59-4¾
2006	Michelle Carter	Texas Longhorns	18.56m 60-10¾
2007	Sarah Stevens	Arizona State Sun Devils	18.16m 59–7
2008	Mariam Kevkhishvili	Florida Gators	17.83m 58–6
2009	Mariam Kevkhishvili	Florida Gators	17.84m 58-6½
2010	Mariam Kevkhishvili	Florida Gators	18.59m
2011	Julie Labonte	Arizona Wildcats	17.53m
2012	Tia Brooks-Wannemacher	Oklahoma Sooners	19.00m
2013	Tia Brooks-Wannemacher	Oklahoma Sooners	19.22m
2014	Christina Hillman	Iowa State Cyclones	18.15m A
2015	Raven Saunders	Ole Miss Rebels	18.62m
2016	Dani Hartung	Kansas State Wildcats	17.97m
2017	Raven Saunders	Ole Miss Rebels	19.56m
2018	Maggie Ewen	Arizona State Sun Devils	18.49m
2019	Samantha Noennig	Arizona State Sun Devils	17.91m
2021	Adelaide Aquilla	Ohio State Buckeyes	18.12m
2022	Jorinde Van Klinken	Arizona State Sun Devils	19.08m
2023	Adelaide Aquilla	Ohio State Buckeyes	19.28m A
2024	Mya Lesnar	Colorado State Rams	18.53m
2025	Axelina Johansson	Nebraska Cornhuskers	19.28m
2026	Axelina Johansson	Nebraska Cornhuskers	19.55m

Men's shot put winners
Year	Athlete	Team	Mark
1965	Randy Matson	Texas A&M Aggies	19.26m 63-2¼
1966	George Woods	Southern Illinois Salukis	18.68m 61-3¼
1967	Ken Patera	BYU Cougars	18.14m 59–6
1968	John Van Reenen	Washington State Cougars	18.92m 62–1
1969	Karl Salb	Kansas Jayhawks	20.34m 66-8¾
1970	Karl Salb	Kansas Jayhawks	20.48m 67-2½
1971	Karl Salb	Kansas Jayhawks	20.04m 65–9
1972	Doug Lane	USC Trojans	19.60m 64-3½
1973	Hans Hogland	UTEP Miners	19.54m 64-1¼
1974	Hans Hogland	UTEP Miners	20.61m 67-7¼
1975	Hans Hogland	UTEP Miners	20.67m 67-9¾
1976	Terry Albritton	Hawaii Rainbow Warriors	20.59m 67-6½
1977	Gary England	Alabama Crimson Tide	19.22m 63-¾
1978	Bruno Pauletto	Central Michigan Chippewas	19.54m 64-1¼
1979	Mark Baughman	Houston Cougars	19.15m 62–10
1980	Mike Carter	SMU Mustangs	20.61m 67-7½
1981	Mike Carter	SMU Mustangs	21.25m 69-8¾
1982	Mike Lehmann	Illinois Fighting Illini	20.62m 67–8
1983	Mike Carter	SMU Mustangs	20.35m 66-9¼
1984	Mike Carter	SMU Mustangs	20.16m 66-1½
1985	Soren Tallhem	BYU Cougars	21.25m 69-8½
1986	Ronald Backes	Minnesota Golden Gophers	21.01m 68-11¼
1987	Lars Nilsen	SMU Mustangs	20.24m 66–5
1988	Ed Wade	Oklahoma Sooners	19.35m 63–6
1989	Mike Stulce	Texas A&M Aggies	20.81m 68-3¼
1990	CJ Hunter	Penn State Nittany Lions	19.62m 64-4½
1991	Eric Bergreen	UCLA Bruins	19.17m 62-10¾
1992	Kevin Coleman	Nebraska Cornhuskers	20.06m 65-9¾
1993	Kevin Coleman	Nebraska Cornhuskers	19.43m 63–9
1994	John Godina	UCLA Bruins	20.03m 65-8¾
1995	John Godina	UCLA Bruins	20.40m 66-11¼
1996	Jonathan Ogden	UCLA Bruins	19.42m 63-8¾
1997	Aaron Ausmus	Tennessee Volunteers	19.01m 62-4½
1998	Brad Snyder	South Carolina Gamecocks	20.22m 66-4¼
1999	Brad Snyder	South Carolina Gamecocks	19.80m 64-11½
2000	Janus Robberts	SMU Mustangs	19.84m 65-1¼
2001	Janus Robberts	SMU Mustangs	21.36m 70–1
2002	Carl Myerscough	Nebraska Cornhuskers	21.26m 69–9
2003	Carl Myerscough	Nebraska Cornhuskers	21.49m 70-6¼
2004	Dan Taylor	Ohio State Buckeyes	20.30m 66-7¼
2005	Edis Elkasevic	Auburn Tigers	19.69m 64-7¼
2006	Garrett Johnson	Florida State Seminoles	20.48m 67-2¼
2007	Noah Bryant	USC Trojans	20.55m 67-5¼
2008	Ryan Whiting	Arizona State Sun Devils	21.73m 71-3½
2009	Ryan Whiting	Arizona State Sun Devils	20.16m 66-1¾
2010	Ryan Whiting	Arizona State Sun Devils	21.52m
2011	Leif Arrhenius	BYU Cougars	19.92m
2012	Jordan Clarke	Arizona State Sun Devils	20.86m
2013	Jordan Clarke	Arizona State Sun Devils	20.50m
2014	Ryan Crouser	Texas Longhorns	21.21m A
2015	Stipe Zunic	Florida Gators	21.11m
2016	Ryan Crouser	Texas Longhorns	21.28m
2017	Mostafa Amr Hassan	Colorado State Rams	21.27m
2018	Mostafa Amr Hassan	Colorado State Rams	20.86m
2019	Payton Otterdahl	North Dakota State Bison	21.71m
2021	Turner Washington	Arizona State Sun Devils	21.36m
2022	Turner Washington	Arizona State Sun Devils	21.65m
2023	Jordan Geist	Arizona Wildcats	21.15m A
2024	Tarik Robinson-O'Hagan	Ole Miss Rebels	21.05m
2025	Tarik Robinson-O'Hagan	Ole Miss Rebels	20.49m
2026	Tarik Robinson-O'Hagan	Ole Miss Rebels	20.65m
