= Long jump at the NCAA Division I Indoor Track and Field Championships =

The long jump has been held at the NCAA Division I Indoor Track and Field Championships annually since 1967. The women's competition began in 1983.

== Winners ==
Key
A=Altitude assisted

Women's long jump winners
Year	Athlete	Team	Mark
1983	Carol Lewis	Houston Cougars	6.57 m
1984	Angela Thacker	Nebraska Cornhuskers	6.66 m
1985	Carol Lewis	Houston Cougars	6.64 m
1986	Cynthia Henry	UTEP Miners	6.53 m
1987	Shelia Echols	LSU Lady Tigers	6.55 m
1988	Carlette Guidry	Texas Longhorns	6.42 m
1989	Beatrice Utunde	Texas Southern Tigers	6.38 m
1990	Sheila Hudson	California Golden Bears	6.64 m
1991	Diane Guthrie	George Mason Patriots	6.34 m
1992	Jackie Edwards	Stanford Cardinal	6.62 m
1993	Daphne Saunders	LSU Lady Tigers	6.47 m
1994	Daphne Saunders	LSU Lady Tigers	6.73 m
1995	Diane Guthrie-Gresham	George Mason Patriots	6.61 m
1996	Angee Henry	Nebraska Cornhuskers	6.38 m
1997	Trecia Smith	Pittsburgh Panthers	6.66 m
1998	Trecia Smith	Pittsburgh Panthers	6.56 m
1999	Trecia Smith	Pittsburgh Panthers	6.53 m
2000	Keyon Soley	UCLA Bruins	6.52 m
2001	Jenny Adams	Houston Cougars	6.68 m
2002	Elva Goulbourne	Auburn Tigers	6.68 m
2003	Elva Goulbourne	Auburn Tigers	6.81 m
2004	Hyleas Fountain	Georgia Bulldogs	6.58 m
2005	Tianna Madison	Tennessee Volunteers	6.78 m
2006	Marshavet Hooker	Texas Longhorns	6.71 m
2007	Rhonda Watkins	UCLA Bruins	6.57 m
2008	Brittney Reese	Ole Miss Rebels	6.76 m
2009	Eleni Kafourou	Boise State Broncos	6.53 m
2010	Blessing Okagbare	UTEP Miners	6.87 m
2011	Tori Bowie	Southern Miss Golden Eagles	6.52 m
2012	Whitney Gipson	TCU Horned Frogs	6.91 m
2013	Andrea Geubelle	Kansas Jayhawks	6.55 m
2014	Lorraine Ugen	TCU Horned Frogs	6.73 m
2015	Jenna Prandini	Oregon Ducks	6.65 m
2016	Quanesha Burks	Alabama Crimson Tide	6.80 m
2017	Sha'Keela Saunders	Kentucky Wildcats	6.90 m
2018	Kate Hall	Georgia Bulldogs	6.73 m
2019	Jasmyn Steels	Northwestern State Lady Demons	6.46 m
2021	Tara Davis-Woodhall	Texas Longhorns	6.93 m
2022	Jasmine Moore	Florida Gators	6.57 m
2023	Jasmine Moore	Florida Gators	7.03 m
2024	Sydney Willits	Iowa State Cyclones	6.74 m
2025	Alexis Brown	Baylor Bears	6.90 m
2026	Sophia Beckmon	Illinois Fighting Illini	6.84 m

Men's long jump winners
Year	Athlete	Team	Mark
1965	Mike Cole	Maryland Terrapins	7.64 m
1966	Rainer Stenius	Cal State Los Angeles Golden Eagles	7.80 m
1967	Aaron Hopkins	Toledo Rockets	7.51 m
1968	Bob Beamon	UTEP Miners	8.30 m
1969	Ron Jessie	Kansas Jayhawks	7.68 m
1970	Bill Lightsey	Kentucky Wildcats	7.68 m
1971	Henry Hines	USC Trojans	7.96 m
1972	Henry Hines	USC Trojans	7.87 m
1973	Randy Williams	USC Trojans	8.03 m
1974	Kingsley Adams	Colorado Buffaloes	7.72 m
1975	Theo Hamilton	Kansas Jayhawks	8.11 m
1976	Charlton Ehizuelen	Illinois Fighting Illini	7.62 m
1977	Charlton Ehizuelen	Illinois Fighting Illini	7.84 m
1978	Al Ogunfeyimi	Ohio Bobcats	7.78 m
1979	Larry Myricks	Mississippi College Choctaws	7.89 m
1980	Carl Lewis	Houston Cougars	8.04 m
1981	Carl Lewis	Houston Cougars	8.48 m
1982	Gilbert Smith	UT Arlington Mavericks	7.95 m
1983	Reginald Kelly	Jackson State Tigers	8.10 m
1984	Mike Conley	Arkansas Razorbacks	7.82 m
1985	Mike Conley	Arkansas Razorbacks	7.88 m
1986	Kenny Harrison	Kansas State Wildcats	8.17 m
1987	Andre Ester	Louisiana–Monroe Warhawks	8.13 m
1988	Andre Ester	Louisiana–Monroe Warhawks	8.03 m
1989	Leroy Burrell	Houston Cougars	8.09 m
1990	Leroy Burrell	Houston Cougars	8.23 m
1991	Alan Turner	Indiana Hoosiers	8.06 m
1992	Erick Walder	Arkansas Razorbacks	8.01 m
1993	Erick Walder	Arkansas Razorbacks	8.33 m
1994	Erick Walder	Arkansas Razorbacks	8.43 m
1995	Kareem Streete-Thompson	Rice Owls	8.03 m
1996	Andrew Owusu	Alabama Crimson Tide	7.90 m
1997	Robert Howard	Arkansas Razorbacks	8.16 m
1998	Bashir Yamini	Iowa Hawkeyes	7.93 m
1999	Maurice Wignall	George Mason Patriots	7.96 m
2000	Melvin Lister	Arkansas Razorbacks	8.14 m
2001	Savante Stringfellow	Ole Miss Rebels	8.08 m
2002	Miguel Pate	Alabama Crimson Tide	8.34 m
2003	Brian Johnson	Southern Jaguars	8.28 m
2004	John Moffitt	LSU Tigers	8.17 m
2005	Aarik Wilson	Indiana Hoosiers	8.17 m
2006	Arturs Abolins	Nebraska Cornhuskers	8.11 m
2007	Tone Belt	Louisville Cardinals	7.97 m
2008	Reindell Cole	Cal State Northridge Matadors	8.12 m
2009	Nicholas Gordon	Nebraska Cornhuskers	8.03 m
2010	Alain Bailey	Arkansas Razorbacks	8.17 m
2011	Ngonidzashe Makusha	Florida State Seminoles	8.14 m
2012	Kendall Spencer	New Mexico Lobos	8.01 m
2013	Marquis Dendy	Florida Gators	8.28 m
2014	Jarrion Lawson	Arkansas Razorbacks	8.39 m
2015	Marquis Dendy	Florida Gators	8.28 m
2016	Jarrion Lawson	Arkansas Razorbacks	7.95 m
2017	KeAndre Bates	Florida Gators	8.04 m
2018	Will Williams	Texas A&M Aggies	8.19 m
2019	Rayvon Grey	LSU Tigers	7.97 m
2021	JuVaughn Harrison	LSU Tigers	8.45 m
2022	Wayne Pinnock	Tennessee Volunteers	7.92 m
2023	Carey McLeod	Arkansas Razorbacks	8.40 m
2024	Wayne Pinnock	Arkansas Razorbacks	8.40 m
2025	(Trinidad and Tobago) Kelsey Daniel	Texas Longhorns	8.16 m
2026	(India) Lokesh Sathyanathan	Tarleton State Texans	8.21 m
