= 3000 meters at the NCAA Division I Indoor Track and Field Championships =

The 3000 meters and its imperial two miles equivalent have been held at the NCAA Division I Indoor Track and Field Championships since its founding in 1965. The imperial distance was contested until 1983, while the metric distance has been run since 1984. Hand timing was used until 1975, while starting in 1976 fully automatic timing was used. In 1986 and 1987, the 1/10-mile track that the races were run on was 25 inches (640 mm) per lap short, making the actual race distance less than 3000 meters those years.

== Winners ==
Key
y=yards
A=Altitude assisted

Women's 3000 m / 2 mi winners
Year	Athlete	Team	Time
1983	PattiSue Plumer	Stanford Cardinal	9:45.54 y
1984	Cathy Branta	Wisconsin Badgers	9:04.81
1985	Christine McMiken	Oklahoma State Cowgirls	8:58.68
1986	Stephanie Herbst	Wisconsin Badgers	8:54.98
1987	Vicki Huber	Villanova Wildcats	9:06.45
1988	Vicki Huber	Villanova Wildcats	9:05.67
1989	Vicki Huber	Villanova Wildcats	8:55.29
1990	Suzy Favor	Wisconsin Badgers	9:02.30
1991	Patty Wiegand	Tennessee Volunteers	9:09.83
1992	Geraldine Hendricken	Providence Friars	9:14.57
1993	Clare Eichner	Wisconsin Badgers	9:09.66
1994	Kay Gooch	Oklahoma Sooners	8:58.85
1995	Sarah Schwald	Arkansas Razorbacks	9:19.90
1996	Melody Fairchild	Oregon Ducks	9:07.25
1997	Kristine Jost	Villanova Wildcats	9:14.14
1998	Katie McGregor	Michigan Wolverines	9:24.68
1999	Carrie Tollefson	Villanova Wildcats	9:15.05
2000	Carrie Tollefson	Villanova Wildcats	9:13.68
2001	Shannon Smith	Boston College Eagles	9:11.25
2002	Lauren Fleshman	Stanford Cardinal	9:07.45
2003	Shalane Flanagan	North Carolina Tar Heels	9:01.05
2004	Kim Smith	Providence Friars	8:49.18
2005	Renee Metivier	Colorado Buffaloes	9:22.81
2006	Johanna Nilsson	Northern Arizona Lumberjacks	9:06.61
2007	Sally Kipyego	Texas Tech Red Raiders	9:02.05
2008	Susan Krumins	Florida State Seminoles	8:58.14
2009	Jenny Barringer	Colorado Buffaloes	8:42.03
2010	Angela Bizzarri	Illinois Fighting Illini	8:57.40
2011	Jordan Hasay	Oregon Ducks	9:13.71
2012	Emily Infeld	Georgetown Hoyas	9:15.44
2013	Abbey Cooper	Dartmouth Big Green	9:01.08
2014	Abbey Cooper	Dartmouth Big Green	9:14.47 A
2015	Dominique Scott	Arkansas Razorbacks	8:55.19
2016	Molly Seidel	Notre Dame Fighting Irish	8:57.86
2017	Dani Jones	Colorado Buffaloes	9:09.20
2018	Karissa Schweizer	Missouri Tigers	8:53.36
2019	Jessica Hull	Oregon Ducks	9:01.14
2021	Courtney Wayment	BYU Cougars	9:01.47
2022	Taylor Roe	Oklahoma State Cowgirls	8:58.95
2023	Katelyn Tuohy	NC State Wolfpack	9:10.07 A
2024	Parker Valby	Florida Gators	8:41.50
2025	(Canada) Ceili McCabe	West Virginia Mountaineers	9:01.18
2026	Jane Hedengren	BYU Cougars	8:36.61

Men's 3000 m / 2 mi winners
Year	Athlete	Team	Time
1965	Herald Hadley	Kansas Jayhawks	8:56.4 y
1966	Gerry Lindgren	Washington State Cougars	8:41.3 y
1967	Gerry Lindgren	Washington State Cougars	8:34.7 y
1968	Jim Ryun	Kansas Jayhawks	8:38.9 y
1969	Ole Olseon	USC Trojans	8:45.2 y
1970	Jerry Richey	Pittsburgh Panthers	8:39.2 y
1971	Marty Liquori	Villanova Wildcats	8:37.1 y
1972	Sid Sink	Bowling Green Falcons	8:36.5 y
1973	Michael Keogh	Manhattan Jaspers	8:38.7 y
1974	John Harnett	Villanova Wildcats	8:33.6 y
1975	Nick Rose	Western Kentucky Hilltoppers	8:44.0 y
1976	Nick Rose	Western Kentucky Hilltoppers	8:30.91 y
1977	Henry Rono	Washington State Cougars	8:24.83 y
1978	Gerard Deegan	Providence Friars	8:41.39 y
1979	Suleiman Nyambui (TAN)	UTEP Miners	8:37.87 y
1980	Suleiman Nyambui (TAN)	UTEP Miners	8:36.82 y
1981	Doug Padilla	BYU Cougars	8:26.52 y
1982	Suleiman Nyambui (TAN)	UTEP Miners	8:38.91 y
1983	Mark Scrutton	Colorado Buffaloes	8:29.29 y
1984	Peter Koech	Washington State Cougars	8:04.20
1985	Kevin King	Georgetown Hoyas	7:51.46
1986	Paul Donovan	Arkansas Razorbacks	7:54.60
1987	Joe Falcon	Arkansas Razorbacks	7:56.79
1988	Joe Falcon	Arkansas Razorbacks	7:55.80
1989	Greg Whiteley	Brown Bears	7:57.14
1990	Reuben Reina	Arkansas Razorbacks	7:56.62
1991	Reuben Reina	Arkansas Razorbacks	7:50.99
1992	Josephat Kapkory	Washington State Cougars	7:59.04
1993	David Morris	Montana Grizzlies	8:04.17
1994	Josephat Kapkory	Washington State Cougars	7:50.90
1995	Jason Bunston	Arkansas Razorbacks	8:06.81
1996	Ryan Wilson	Arkansas Razorbacks	7:51.66
1997	Adam Goucher	Colorado Buffaloes	7:54.20
1998	Adam Goucher	Colorado Buffaloes	7:46.03
1999	Bernard Lagat (KEN)	Washington State Cougars	7:54.92
2000	David Kimani	South Alabama Jaguars	7:52.64
2001	David Kimani	Alabama Crimson Tide	8:03.29
2002	Adrian Blincoe	Villanova Wildcats	8:01.76
2003	Alistair Cragg	Arkansas Razorbacks	7:55.68
2004	Alistair Cragg	Arkansas Razorbacks	7:55.29
2005	Chris Solinsky	Wisconsin Badgers	7:53.59
2006	Chris Solinsky	Wisconsin Badgers	7:59.68
2007	Lopez Lomong	Northern Arizona Lumberjacks	7:49.74
2008	Kyle Alcorn	Arizona State Sun Devils	8:00.82
2009	Galen Rupp	Oregon Ducks	7:48.94
2010	Dorian Ulrey	Arkansas Razorbacks	8:10.52
2011	Elliott Heath	Stanford Cardinal	8:03.71
2012	Lawi Lalang	Arizona Wildcats	7:46.64
2013	Lawi Lalang	Arizona Wildcats	7:45.94
2014	Edward Cheserek	Oregon Ducks	8:11.59 A
2015	Eric Jenkins	Oregon Ducks	7:58.81
2016	Edward Cheserek	Oregon Ducks	8:00.40
2017	Edward Cheserek	Oregon Ducks	7:55.91
2018	Andy Trouard	Northern Arizona Lumberjacks	8:04.94
2019	Morgan McDonald	Wisconsin Badgers	7:52.85
2021	Cole Hocker	Oregon Ducks	7:46.15
2022	Abdihamid Nur	Northern Arizona Lumberjacks	7:59.88
2023	Fouad Messaoudi	Oklahoma State Cowboys	7:48.10 A
2024	Nico Young	Northern Arizona Lumberjacks	7:41.01
2025	Ethan Strand	North Carolina Tar Heels	7:52.03
2026	Colin Sahlman	Northern Arizona Lumberjacks	7:41.66
