= Houston Cougars track and field =

American college track and field team

- University: University of Houston
- Head coach: Carl Lewis
- Conference: Big 12
- Location: Houston, Texas
- Outdoor track: Tom Tellez Track at Carl Lewis International Complex
- Nickname: Cougars
- Colors: Scarlet and white

The Houston Cougars track and field team is the track and field program that represents University of Houston. The Cougars compete in NCAA Division I as a member of the Big 12 Conference. The team is based in Houston, Texas, at the Tom Tellez Track at Carl Lewis International Complex.

The program is coached by Carl Lewis. The track and field program officially encompasses four teams because the NCAA considers men's and women's indoor track and field and outdoor track and field as separate sports.

Lewis was first named head coach in July 2023, after spending ten years as a volunteer or assistant coach. The men's team finished runner-up at the 2019 NCAA Division I Indoor Track and Field Championships, a performance that Lewis thought they "should have won".

== Postseason ==
=== AIAW ===
The Cougars have had four AIAW individual All-Americans finishing in the top six at the AIAW indoor or outdoor championships.

AIAW All-Americans
Championships	Name	Event	Place
1980 Indoor	Amy Davis	Long jump	4th
1980 Outdoor	Amy Davis	4 × 100 meters relay	4th
1980 Outdoor	Bridgett Singleton	4 × 100 meters relay	4th
1980 Outdoor	Cruz Ibarguen	4 × 100 meters relay	4th
1980 Outdoor	Vickie Finch	4 × 100 meters relay	4th
1980 Outdoor	Amy Davis	Long jump	4th
1981 Indoor	Tara Mastin	60 meters	4th
1981 Indoor	Rachel Clary	4 × 200 meters relay	3rd
1981 Indoor	Cruz Ibarguen	4 × 200 meters relay	3rd
1981 Indoor	Tara Mastin	4 × 200 meters relay	3rd
1981 Indoor	Darlene Jefferson	4 × 200 meters relay	3rd
1981 Indoor	Patsy Walker	Pentathlon	1st
1981 Outdoor	Dana Olson	Javelin throw	3rd
1981 Outdoor	Patsy Walker	Heptathlon	1st

=== NCAA ===
As of August 2025, a total of 75 men and 30 women have achieved individual first-team All-American status at the Division I men's outdoor, women's outdoor, men's indoor, or women's indoor national championships (using the modern criteria of top-8 placing regardless of athlete nationality).

First team NCAA All-Americans
Team	Championships	Name	Event	Place	Ref.
Men's	1958 Outdoor	Jerry Smartt	3000 meters	4th	
Men's	1959 Outdoor	John Macy	3000 meters steeplechase	1st	
Men's	1959 Outdoor	Jerry Smartt	3000 meters steeplechase	4th	
Men's	1959 Outdoor	John Macy	5000 meters	3rd	
Men's	1959 Outdoor	Jack Smythe	Triple jump	1st	
Men's	1959 Outdoor	Bobby Weise	Discus throw	2nd	
Men's	1960 Outdoor	John Macy	3000 meters steeplechase	5th	
Men's	1960 Outdoor	Al Lawrence	5000 meters	1st	
Men's	1960 Outdoor	Pat Clohessy	5000 meters	2nd	
Men's	1960 Outdoor	Bobby Weise	Discus throw	7th	
Men's	1961 Outdoor	Barrie Almond	Mile run	7th	
Men's	1961 Outdoor	Pat Clohessy	5000 meters	1st	
Men's	1961 Outdoor	John Macy	5000 meters	5th	
Men's	1962 Outdoor	Pat Clohessy	Mile run	5th	
Men's	1962 Outdoor	Geoff Walker	3000 meters steeplechase	7th	
Men's	1962 Outdoor	Pat Clohessy	5000 meters	1st	
Men's	1963 Outdoor	Geoff Walker	3000 meters steeplechase	7th	
Men's	1964 Outdoor	Cyler Thompson	110 meters hurdles	5th	
Men's	1964 Outdoor	Boyd Timmons	4 × 100 meters relay	5th	
Men's	1964 Outdoor	Cyler Thompson	4 × 100 meters relay	5th	
Men's	1964 Outdoor	Bob McCartney	4 × 100 meters relay	5th	
Men's	1964 Outdoor	Charron Malloch	4 × 100 meters relay	5th	
Men's	1965 Outdoor	Charron Maloch	4 × 100 meters relay	8th	
Men's	1965 Outdoor	Cyler Thompson	4 × 100 meters relay	8th	
Men's	1965 Outdoor	Butch Reed	4 × 100 meters relay	8th	
Men's	1965 Outdoor	Ralph Miller	4 × 100 meters relay	8th	
Men's	1970 Indoor	Robert Mitchell	4 × 400 meters relay	5th	
Men's	1970 Indoor	Marvin Mayes	4 × 400 meters relay	5th	
Men's	1970 Indoor	Louis Vicenik	4 × 400 meters relay	5th	
Men's	1970 Indoor	Dave Wagner	4 × 400 meters relay	5th	
Men's	1971 Outdoor	Len Hilton	5000 meters	3rd	
Men's	1977 Indoor	Greg Edmond	55 meters	1st	
Men's	1977 Outdoor	Cecil Overstreet	Long jump	8th	
Men's	1977 Outdoor	Greg Caldwell	Triple jump	6th	
Men's	1977 Outdoor	Richard Lacombe	Decathlon	2nd	
Men's	1978 Indoor	Brett Dames	Pole vault	4th	
Men's	1978 Outdoor	Mark Baughman	Discus throw	7th	
Men's	1979 Indoor	Rich Edwards	55 meters	5th	
Men's	1979 Indoor	Mark Baughman	Shot put	1st	
Men's	1979 Outdoor	Rich Edwards	100 meters	4th	
Men's	1979 Outdoor	Rich Edwards	200 meters	4th	
Men's	1979 Outdoor	Charles Whigham	400 meters hurdles	8th	
Men's	1979 Outdoor	Greg Caldwell	Triple jump	6th	
Men's	1979 Outdoor	Mark Baughman	Discus throw	6th	
Men's	1979 Outdoor	Wes Herbst	Decathlon	4th	
Men's	1980 Indoor	Carl Lewis	Long jump	1st	
Men's	1980 Indoor	Mark Baughman	Shot put	4th	
Men's	1980 Outdoor	Mark Herns	Pole vault	5th	
Men's	1980 Outdoor	Carl Lewis	Long jump	1st	
Men's	1981 Indoor	Carl Lewis	55 meters	1st	
Men's	1981 Indoor	Carl Lewis	Long jump	1st	
Men's	1981 Outdoor	Carl Lewis	100 meters	1st	
Men's	1981 Outdoor	Cletus Clark	110 meters hurdles	5th	
Men's	1981 Outdoor	Carl Lewis	Long jump	1st	
Men's	1981 Outdoor	David Saye	Decathlon	5th	
Men's	1982 Indoor	Stanley Floyd	55 meters	2nd	
Men's	1982 Indoor	Anthony Ketchum	400 meters	1st	
Men's	1982 Indoor	Brian Stanton	High jump	4th	
Men's	1982 Outdoor	Stanley Floyd	100 meters	1st	
Men's	1982 Outdoor	Mark McNeil	100 meters	4th	
Men's	1982 Outdoor	Charles Young	4 × 100 meters relay	1st	
Men's	1982 Outdoor	Mark McNeil	4 × 100 meters relay	1st	
Men's	1982 Outdoor	Anthony Ketchum	4 × 100 meters relay	1st	
Men's	1982 Outdoor	Stanley Floyd	4 × 100 meters relay	1st	
Men's	1982 Outdoor	Marshall Broadway	High jump	7th	
Men's	1982 Outdoor	Brian Stanton	High jump	8th	
Men's	1982 Outdoor	Rick Meyer	Discus throw	5th	
Women's	1982 Outdoor	Jackie Washington	100 meters	6th	
Women's	1982 Outdoor	Jackie Washington	4 × 100 meters relay	8th	
Women's	1982 Outdoor	Carol Lewis	4 × 100 meters relay	8th	
Women's	1982 Outdoor	Darlene Jefferson	4 × 100 meters relay	8th	
Women's	1982 Outdoor	Pat Lavallias	4 × 100 meters relay	8th	
Women's	1982 Outdoor	Robin Stephens	4 × 400 meters relay	8th	
Women's	1982 Outdoor	Rachael Clary	4 × 400 meters relay	8th	
Women's	1982 Outdoor	Valerie Sutton	4 × 400 meters relay	8th	
Women's	1982 Outdoor	Andrea Berry	4 × 400 meters relay	8th	
Women's	1982 Outdoor	Carol Lewis	Long jump	3rd	
Women's	1982 Outdoor	Dana Olson	Javelin throw	6th	
Men's	1983 Indoor	Mark McNeil	55 meters	3rd	
Men's	1983 Indoor	Brian Stanton	High jump	1st	
Men's	1983 Indoor	Byron Griddle	Triple jump	3rd	
Women's	1983 Indoor	Michelle Glover	55 meters	2nd	
Women's	1983 Indoor	Cindy Anzalone	1000 meters	3rd	
Women's	1983 Indoor	Carol Lewis	Long jump	1st	
Men's	1983 Outdoor	Kirk Baptiste	200 meters	3rd	
Men's	1983 Outdoor	Byron Criddle	Triple jump	4th	
Men's	1983 Outdoor	Rick Meyer	Discus throw	2nd	
Women's	1983 Outdoor	Michele Glover	100 meters	7th	
Women's	1983 Outdoor	Tara Mastin	4 × 100 meters relay	4th	
Women's	1983 Outdoor	Jackie Washington	4 × 100 meters relay	4th	
Women's	1983 Outdoor	Carol Lewis	4 × 100 meters relay	4th	
Women's	1983 Outdoor	Michele Glover	4 × 100 meters relay	4th	
Women's	1983 Outdoor	Rachael Clary	4 × 400 meters relay	8th	
Women's	1983 Outdoor	Cruz Ibarquen	4 × 400 meters relay	8th	
Women's	1983 Outdoor	Andrea Berry	4 × 400 meters relay	8th	
Women's	1983 Outdoor	Maxine Underwood	4 × 400 meters relay	8th	
Women's	1983 Outdoor	Carol Lewis	Long jump	1st	
Women's	1983 Outdoor	Patsy Walker	Heptathlon	3rd	
Men's	1984 Indoor	Cletus Clark	55 meters hurdles	2nd	
Women's	1984 Indoor	Carol Lewis	Long jump	2nd	
Men's	1984 Outdoor	Kirk Baptiste	100 meters	3rd	
Men's	1984 Outdoor	Cletus Clark	110 meters hurdles	4th	
Men's	1984 Outdoor	Kirk Baptiste	200 meters	1st	
Women's	1984 Outdoor	Jackie Washington	100 meters	3rd	
Women's	1984 Outdoor	Tara Mastin	4 × 100 meters relay	3rd	
Women's	1984 Outdoor	Michele Glover	4 × 100 meters relay	3rd	
Women's	1984 Outdoor	Carol Lewis	4 × 100 meters relay	3rd	
Women's	1984 Outdoor	Jackie Washington	4 × 100 meters relay	3rd	
Women's	1984 Outdoor	Rachael Clary	4 × 400 meters relay	7th	
Women's	1984 Outdoor	Tara Mastin	4 × 400 meters relay	7th	
Women's	1984 Outdoor	Robin Stephens	4 × 400 meters relay	7th	
Women's	1984 Outdoor	Andrea Berry	4 × 400 meters relay	7th	
Men's	1985 Indoor	Mark Reed	High jump	6th	
Men's	1985 Indoor	Lyndon Sands	Long jump	6th	
Men's	1985 Indoor	Byron Criddle	Triple jump	6th	
Women's	1985 Indoor	Michelle Glover	55 meters	4th	
Women's	1985 Indoor	Carol Lewis	55 meters hurdles	6th	
Women's	1985 Indoor	Nora Collas	3000 meters	4th	
Women's	1985 Indoor	Kym Carter	High jump	5th	
Women's	1985 Indoor	Carol Lewis	Long jump	1st	
Men's	1985 Outdoor	Kirk Baptiste	200 meters	1st	
Men's	1985 Outdoor	Byron Criddle	Triple jump	3rd	
Men's	1985 Outdoor	Rick Meyer	Discus throw	1st	
Women's	1985 Outdoor	Nora Collas	5000 meters	4th	
Women's	1985 Outdoor	Nora Collas	10,000 meters	3rd	
Women's	1985 Outdoor	Carol Lewis	Long jump	1st	
Men's	1986 Indoor	Leroy Burrell	55 meters	3rd	
Men's	1986 Indoor	Frank Rutherford	Triple jump	1st	
Women's	1986 Indoor	Kym Carter	High jump	4th	
Men's	1986 Outdoor	Marshall Broadway	High jump	4th	
Men's	1986 Outdoor	Lyndon Sands	Long jump	5th	
Men's	1986 Outdoor	Frank Rutherford	Triple jump	2nd	
Women's	1986 Outdoor	Gina McMenamin	10,000 meters	7th	
Women's	1986 Outdoor	Cheryl Klein	Shot put	8th	
Women's	1986 Outdoor	Jolanda Jones	Heptathlon	1st	
Women's	1986 Outdoor	Debbie Dacosta	Heptathlon	7th	
Men's	1987 Indoor	Joe Deloach	55 meters	4th	
Men's	1987 Indoor	Mark Reed	High jump	8th	
Men's	1987 Indoor	Frank Rutherford	Triple jump	1st	
Women's	1987 Indoor	Cheryl Klein	Shot put	7th	
Men's	1987 Outdoor	Frank Rutherford	Triple jump	1st	
Men's	1987 Outdoor	Harry Clark	Decathlon	8th	
Women's	1987 Outdoor	Cheryl Klein	Shot put	7th	
Women's	1987 Outdoor	Jolanda Jones	Heptathlon	1st	
Men's	1988 Indoor	Joe Deloach	55 meters	4th	
Men's	1988 Indoor	Joe Deloach	200 meters	8th	
Women's	1988 Indoor	Rochelle Greenwell	4 × 800 meters relay	3rd	
Women's	1988 Indoor	Donyale Greenwell	4 × 800 meters relay	3rd	
Women's	1988 Indoor	Theresa Dunn-Fuqua	4 × 800 meters relay	3rd	
Women's	1988 Indoor	Nanette Garcia	4 × 800 meters relay	3rd	
Men's	1988 Outdoor	Joe Deloach	100 meters	1st	
Men's	1988 Outdoor	Leroy Burrell	100 meters	5th	
Men's	1988 Outdoor	Kevin Mason	400 meters hurdles	8th	
Men's	1988 Outdoor	Leroy Burrell	Long jump	7th	
Women's	1988 Outdoor	Theresa Dunn	800 meters	5th	
Men's	1989 Indoor	Leroy Burrell	55 meters	2nd	
Men's	1989 Indoor	Leroy Burrell	Long jump	1st	
Men's	1989 Indoor	Don Parish	Triple jump	7th	
Women's	1989 Indoor	Rochelle Greenwell	4 × 800 meters relay	3rd	
Women's	1989 Indoor	Shynae Godfrey	4 × 800 meters relay	3rd	
Women's	1989 Indoor	Michele Billings	4 × 800 meters relay	3rd	
Women's	1989 Indoor	Donyale Greenwell	4 × 800 meters relay	3rd	
Women's	1989 Indoor	Jolanda Jones	High jump	4th	
Men's	1989 Outdoor	Leroy Burrell	100 meters	5th	
Men's	1989 Outdoor	Kevin Mason	400 meters hurdles	6th	
Men's	1989 Outdoor	Rayford Ross	4 × 100 meters relay	3rd	
Men's	1989 Outdoor	Sam Lowe	4 × 100 meters relay	3rd	
Men's	1989 Outdoor	Clyde Duncan Jr.	4 × 100 meters relay	3rd	
Men's	1989 Outdoor	Leroy Burrell	4 × 100 meters relay	3rd	
Men's	1989 Outdoor	Leroy Burrell	Long jump	2nd	
Women's	1989 Outdoor	Ursula Younger	4 × 100 meters relay	5th	
Women's	1989 Outdoor	Yolanda Harper	4 × 100 meters relay	5th	
Women's	1989 Outdoor	Cecilia Crockett	4 × 100 meters relay	5th	
Women's	1989 Outdoor	Felicia Holloway	4 × 100 meters relay	5th	
Women's	1989 Outdoor	Jolanda Jones	Heptathlon	1st	
Men's	1990 Indoor	Leroy Burrell	55 meters	2nd	
Men's	1990 Indoor	Leroy Burrell	Long jump	1st	
Men's	1990 Outdoor	Leroy Burrell	100 meters	1st	
Women's	1991 Indoor	Michele Collins	200 meters	6th	
Women's	1991 Outdoor	Michele Collins	200 meters	7th	
Women's	1991 Outdoor	Sandra Cummings	400 meters hurdles	5th	
Women's	1991 Outdoor	Cynthia Jackson	4 × 100 meters relay	7th	
Women's	1991 Outdoor	Cecilia Crockett	4 × 100 meters relay	7th	
Women's	1991 Outdoor	Michele Collins	4 × 100 meters relay	7th	
Women's	1991 Outdoor	Yolanda Harper	4 × 100 meters relay	7th	
Women's	1992 Indoor	Michele Collins	200 meters	1st	
Women's	1992 Indoor	Michele Collins	4 × 400 meters relay	2nd	
Women's	1992 Indoor	Drexel Long	4 × 400 meters relay	2nd	
Women's	1992 Indoor	De'Angelia Johnson	4 × 400 meters relay	2nd	
Women's	1992 Indoor	Cecilia Crockett	4 × 400 meters relay	2nd	
Women's	1992 Outdoor	Michele Collins	200 meters	5th	
Women's	1992 Outdoor	Dawn Burrell	4 × 100 meters relay	8th	
Women's	1992 Outdoor	De'Angelia Johnson	4 × 100 meters relay	8th	
Women's	1992 Outdoor	Cecilia Crockett	4 × 100 meters relay	8th	
Women's	1992 Outdoor	Michele Collins	4 × 100 meters relay	8th	
Women's	1993 Indoor	Michele Collins	200 meters	3rd	
Women's	1993 Indoor	De'Angelia Johnson	4 × 400 meters relay	2nd	
Women's	1993 Indoor	Drexel Long	4 × 400 meters relay	2nd	
Women's	1993 Indoor	Cynthia Jackson	4 × 400 meters relay	2nd	
Women's	1993 Indoor	Michele Collins	4 × 400 meters relay	2nd	
Men's	1993 Outdoor	Sam Jefferson	100 meters	3rd	
Men's	1993 Outdoor	Sam Jefferson	200 meters	5th	
Women's	1993 Outdoor	Michele Collins	200 meters	6th	
Women's	1993 Outdoor	Janinne Courville	4 × 100 meters relay	6th	
Women's	1993 Outdoor	Cynthia Jackson	4 × 100 meters relay	6th	
Women's	1993 Outdoor	Dawn Burrell	4 × 100 meters relay	6th	
Women's	1993 Outdoor	Michele Collins	4 × 100 meters relay	6th	
Women's	1993 Outdoor	Drexel Long	4 × 400 meters relay	7th	
Women's	1993 Outdoor	Dawn Burrell	4 × 400 meters relay	7th	
Women's	1993 Outdoor	Cynthia Jackson	4 × 400 meters relay	7th	
Women's	1993 Outdoor	Michele Collins	4 × 400 meters relay	7th	
Women's	1993 Outdoor	Edwina Ammonds	Heptathlon	7th	
Women's	1994 Indoor	De'Angelia Johnson	4 × 400 meters relay	2nd	
Women's	1994 Indoor	Nicole Ates	4 × 400 meters relay	2nd	
Women's	1994 Indoor	Drexel Long	4 × 400 meters relay	2nd	
Women's	1994 Indoor	Cynthia Jackson	4 × 400 meters relay	2nd	
Men's	1994 Outdoor	Sam Jefferson	100 meters	1st	
Men's	1994 Outdoor	Ubeja Anderson	110 meters hurdles	4th	
Men's	1994 Outdoor	Isaac Bell	4 × 100 meters relay	3rd	
Men's	1994 Outdoor	Sheddric Fields	4 × 100 meters relay	3rd	
Men's	1994 Outdoor	Sam Jefferson	4 × 100 meters relay	3rd	
Men's	1994 Outdoor	Ubeja Anderson	4 × 100 meters relay	3rd	
Men's	1994 Outdoor	Sheddric Fields	Long jump	3rd	
Men's	1995 Indoor	Sheddric Fields	Long jump	4th	
Men's	1995 Outdoor	Ubeja Anderson	110 meters hurdles	3rd	
Men's	1995 Outdoor	Isaac Bell	4 × 100 meters relay	7th	
Men's	1995 Outdoor	Sheddric Fields	4 × 100 meters relay	7th	
Men's	1995 Outdoor	Eric Hayes	4 × 100 meters relay	7th	
Men's	1995 Outdoor	Ubeja Anderson	4 × 100 meters relay	7th	
Men's	1995 Outdoor	Sheddric Fields	Long jump	6th	
Men's	1996 Indoor	Darius Pemberton	55 meters hurdles	1st	
Men's	1996 Indoor	Nathan Labus	Pole vault	3rd	
Men's	1996 Indoor	Darius Pemberton	Long jump	4th	
Men's	1996 Indoor	Sheddric Fields	Long jump	8th	
Men's	1996 Indoor	John Davis	Shot put	6th	
Men's	1996 Outdoor	Darius Pemberton	110 meters hurdles	4th	
Men's	1996 Outdoor	Darius Pemberton	Long jump	5th	
Men's	1997 Indoor	Chris Jones	4 × 400 meters relay	5th	
Men's	1997 Indoor	Darius Pemberton	4 × 400 meters relay	5th	
Men's	1997 Indoor	Karim Alston	4 × 400 meters relay	5th	
Men's	1997 Indoor	Dennis Darling	4 × 400 meters relay	5th	
Men's	1997 Indoor	Darius Pemberton	Long jump	5th	
Men's	1997 Outdoor	Chris Jones	400 meters	5th	
Men's	1998 Indoor	John Davis	Shot put	3rd	
Women's	1998 Indoor	Jenny Adams	Long jump	4th	
Men's	1998 Outdoor	Dennis Darling	400 meters	6th	
Men's	1998 Outdoor	John Davis	Shot put	4th	
Women's	1998 Outdoor	Jenny Adams	100 meters hurdles	4th	
Women's	1998 Outdoor	Jenny Adams	Long jump	3rd	
Men's	1999 Indoor	John Davis	Shot put	4th	
Men's	1999 Outdoor	John Davis	Shot put	6th	
Men's	1999 Outdoor	John Davis	Discus throw	4th	
Men's	1999 Outdoor	Luke Sullivan	Discus throw	5th	
Women's	1999 Outdoor	Jenny Adams	100 meters hurdles	6th	
Women's	1999 Outdoor	Jenny Adams	Long jump	4th	
Women's	1999 Outdoor	Ifoma Jones	Heptathlon	5th	
Men's	2000 Indoor	Nick Decker	High jump	6th	
Women's	2000 Indoor	Jenny Adams	60 meters hurdles	5th	
Women's	2000 Indoor	Jenny Adams	Long jump	5th	
Women's	2000 Outdoor	Jenny Adams	100 meters hurdles	2nd	
Women's	2000 Outdoor	Ifoma Jones	High jump	7th	
Women's	2000 Outdoor	Rhian Clarke	Pole vault	7th	
Women's	2000 Outdoor	Jenny Adams	Long jump	1st	
Women's	2000 Outdoor	Ifoma Jones	Heptathlon	4th	
Women's	2001 Indoor	Jenny Adams	60 meters hurdles	3rd	
Women's	2001 Indoor	Rhian Clakre	Pole vault	4th	
Women's	2001 Indoor	Jenny Adams	Long jump	1st	
Women's	2002 Outdoor	Rhian Clarke	Pole vault	5th	
Women's	2002 Outdoor	Krystal Ward	Heptathlon	6th	
Men's	2003 Indoor	Robert Foster	200 meters	5th	
Men's	2003 Outdoor	Stanford Routt	200 meters	3rd	
Men's	2004 Outdoor	Stanford Routt	200 meters	2nd	
Women's	2005 Indoor	Keisha Howard	4 × 400 meters relay	8th	
Women's	2005 Indoor	Tiffany Abney	4 × 400 meters relay	8th	
Women's	2005 Indoor	Alicia Cave	4 × 400 meters relay	8th	
Women's	2005 Indoor	Cheryl Garner	4 × 400 meters relay	8th	
Women's	2006 Indoor	Keisha Howard	4 × 400 meters relay	8th	
Women's	2006 Indoor	LaDedra Guy	4 × 400 meters relay	8th	
Women's	2006 Indoor	Cheryl Gardner	4 × 400 meters relay	8th	
Women's	2006 Indoor	Ebonie Floyd	4 × 400 meters relay	8th	
Men's	2006 Outdoor	Preston Perry	4 × 100 meters relay	8th	
Men's	2006 Outdoor	Vincent Marshall	4 × 100 meters relay	8th	
Men's	2006 Outdoor	Tremaine Smith	4 × 100 meters relay	8th	
Men's	2006 Outdoor	Kolee Latson	4 × 100 meters relay	8th	
Women's	2006 Outdoor	Ebonie Floyd	200 meters	5th	
Men's	2007 Indoor	Ivan Diggs	High jump	8th	
Women's	2007 Indoor	Ebonie Floyd	200 meters	6th	
Men's	2007 Outdoor	Ivan Diggs	High jump	8th	
Women's	2007 Outdoor	Ebonie Floyd	100 meters	2nd	
Women's	2007 Outdoor	Ebonie Floyd	200 meters	3rd	
Men's	2008 Indoor	Ivan Diggs	High jump	4th	
Women's	2009 Outdoor	Seun Adigun	100 meters hurdles	3rd	
Women's	2010 Indoor	Kalyn Floyd	200 meters	6th	
Women's	2010 Outdoor	Christie Jones	4 × 100 meters relay	5th	
Women's	2010 Outdoor	Whitney Harris	4 × 100 meters relay	5th	
Women's	2010 Outdoor	Kalyn Floyd	4 × 100 meters relay	5th	
Women's	2010 Outdoor	Grecia Bolton	4 × 100 meters relay	5th	
Men's	2011 Indoor	Chris Carter	Triple jump	4th	
Men's	2011 Outdoor	Chris Carter	Triple jump	8th	
Men's	2012 Indoor	Errol Nolan	400 meters	6th	
Women's	2012 Outdoor	Tai'Shea Reese	4 × 100 meters relay	6th	(Note: Track and Field News lists Whitney Harris instead of Bolton)
Women's	2012 Outdoor	Grecia Bolton	4 × 100 meters relay	6th	(Note: Track and Field News lists Whitney Harris instead of Bolton)
Women's	2012 Outdoor	Alicia Perkins	4 × 100 meters relay	6th	(Note: Track and Field News lists Whitney Harris instead of Bolton)
Women's	2012 Outdoor	Kiersten Brewer	4 × 100 meters relay	6th	(Note: Track and Field News lists Whitney Harris instead of Bolton)
Men's	2013 Indoor	Errol Nolan	400 meters	1st	
Men's	2014 Indoor	Cameron Burrell	60 meters	6th	
Men's	2014 Outdoor	John Horton	Triple jump	8th	
Men's	2015 Outdoor	Isaac Williams	110 meters hurdles	3rd	
Men's	2016 Indoor	Cameron Burrell	60 meters	2nd	
Men's	2016 Indoor	Marcus McWilliams	60 meters hurdles	4th	
Men's	2016 Outdoor	Cameron Burrell	100 meters	4th	
Men's	2016 Outdoor	Amere Lattin	110 meters hurdles	5th	
Men's	2016 Outdoor	Leshon Collins	4 × 100 meters relay	2nd	
Men's	2016 Outdoor	Mario Burke	4 × 100 meters relay	2nd	
Men's	2016 Outdoor	Jacarias Martin	4 × 100 meters relay	2nd	
Men's	2016 Outdoor	Cameron Burrell	4 × 100 meters relay	2nd	
Men's	2017 Indoor	Cameron Burrell	60 meters	2nd	
Men's	2017 Indoor	Mario Burke	60 meters	7th	
Men's	2017 Indoor	Brian Barraza	3000 meters	7th	
Men's	2017 Outdoor	Cameron Burrell	100 meters	2nd	
Men's	2017 Outdoor	John Lewis III	4 × 100 meters relay	1st	
Men's	2017 Outdoor	Mario Burke	4 × 100 meters relay	1st	
Men's	2017 Outdoor	Jacarias Martin	4 × 100 meters relay	1st	
Men's	2017 Outdoor	Cameron Burrell	4 × 100 meters relay	1st	
Men's	2018 Indoor	Elijah Hall-Thompson	60 meters	1st	
Men's	2018 Indoor	Elijah Hall-Thompson	200 meters	1st	
Men's	2018 Indoor	Kahmari Montgomery	400 meters	4th	
Men's	2018 Indoor	Nathaniel Mechler	Heptathlon	8th	
Men's	2018 Outdoor	Cameron Burrell	100 meters	1st	
Men's	2018 Outdoor	Elijah Hall-Thompson	100 meters	2nd	
Men's	2018 Outdoor	Mario Burke	100 meters	8th	
Men's	2018 Outdoor	Kahmari Montgomery	400 meters	7th	
Men's	2018 Outdoor	John Lewis III	4 × 100 meters relay	1st	
Men's	2018 Outdoor	Elijah Hall-Thompson	4 × 100 meters relay	1st	
Men's	2018 Outdoor	Mario Burke	4 × 100 meters relay	1st	
Men's	2018 Outdoor	Cameron Burrell	4 × 100 meters relay	1st	
Men's	2018 Outdoor	Amere Lattin	4 × 400 meters relay	5th	
Men's	2018 Outdoor	Trumaine Jefferson	4 × 400 meters relay	5th	
Men's	2018 Outdoor	Mario Burke	4 × 400 meters relay	5th	
Men's	2018 Outdoor	Kahmari Montgomery	4 × 400 meters relay	5th	
Men's	2019 Indoor	Mario Burke	60 meters	2nd	
Men's	2019 Indoor	Amere Lattin	60 meters hurdles	4th	
Men's	2019 Indoor	Obi Igbokwe	200 meters	8th	
Men's	2019 Indoor	Kahmari Montgomery	400 meters	2nd	
Men's	2019 Indoor	Obi Igbokwe	400 meters	5th	
Men's	2019 Indoor	Amere Lattin	4 × 400 meters relay	1st	
Men's	2019 Indoor	Obi Igbokwe	4 × 400 meters relay	1st	
Men's	2019 Indoor	Jermaine Holt	4 × 400 meters relay	1st	
Men's	2019 Indoor	Kahmari Montgomery	4 × 400 meters relay	1st	
Men's	2019 Indoor	Trumaine Jefferson	Long jump	2nd	
Women's	2019 Indoor	Naomi Taylor	60 meters hurdles	4th	
Women's	2019 Indoor	Samiyah Samuels	Long jump	8th	
Women's	2019 Indoor	Taylor Scaife	Weight throw	3rd	
Men's	2019 Outdoor	Mario Burke	100 meters	6th	
Men's	2019 Outdoor	Amere Lattin	110 meters hurdles	7th	
Men's	2019 Outdoor	Mario Burke	200 meters	4th	
Men's	2019 Outdoor	Kahmari Montgomery	400 meters	1st	
Men's	2019 Outdoor	Amere Lattin	400 meters hurdles	3rd	
Men's	2019 Outdoor	Amere Lattin	4 × 400 meters relay	3rd	
Men's	2019 Outdoor	Kahmari Montgomery	4 × 400 meters relay	3rd	
Men's	2019 Outdoor	Jermaine Holt	4 × 400 meters relay	3rd	
Men's	2019 Outdoor	Obi Igbokwe	4 × 400 meters relay	3rd	
Men's	2019 Outdoor	Trumaine Jefferson	Long jump	2nd	
Men's	2021 Outdoor	Shaun Maswanganyi	100 meters	2nd	
Men's	2021 Outdoor	Shaun Maswanganyi	200 meters	3rd	
Men's	2021 Outdoor	Jordan Booker	4 × 100 meters relay	8th	
Men's	2021 Outdoor	Travis Collins	4 × 100 meters relay	8th	
Men's	2021 Outdoor	Christian Hamberlin	4 × 100 meters relay	8th	
Men's	2021 Outdoor	Shaun Maswanganyi	4 × 100 meters relay	8th	
Women's	2021 Outdoor	Camille Rutherford	4 × 100 meters relay	7th	
Women's	2021 Outdoor	Tristan Evelyn	4 × 100 meters relay	7th	
Women's	2021 Outdoor	Samiyah Samuels	4 × 100 meters relay	7th	
Women's	2021 Outdoor	Naomi Taylor	4 × 100 meters relay	7th	
Men's	2022 Outdoor	Shaun Maswanganyi	200 meters	6th	
Men's	2023 Indoor	Shaun Maswanganyi	60 meters	4th	
Men's	2023 Outdoor	Shaun Maswanganyi	100 meters	3rd	
Men's	2023 Outdoor	De'Vion Wilson	110 meters hurdles	2nd	
Men's	2023 Outdoor	Shaun Maswanganyi	200 meters	6th	
Men's	2023 Outdoor	Christyan Sampy	Pole vault	8th	
Men's	2024 Indoor	De'Vion Wilson	60 meters hurdles	4th	
Women's	2024 Indoor	Sydni Townsend	4 × 400 meters relay	3rd	
Women's	2024 Indoor	Kelly-Ann Beckford	4 × 400 meters relay	3rd	
Women's	2024 Indoor	Iman Babineaux	4 × 400 meters relay	3rd	
Women's	2024 Indoor	Michaela Mouton	4 × 400 meters relay	3rd	
Men's	2024 Outdoor	Louie Hinchliffe	100 meters	1st	
Men's	2024 Outdoor	Shaun Maswanganyi	100 meters	7th	
Men's	2024 Outdoor	De'Vion Wilson	110 meters hurdles	5th	
Men's	2024 Outdoor	Shaun Maswanganyi	200 meters	6th	
Men's	2024 Outdoor	Ireon Brown	4 × 100 meters relay	3rd	
Men's	2024 Outdoor	Louie Hinchliffe	4 × 100 meters relay	3rd	
Men's	2024 Outdoor	Cayden Broadnax	4 × 100 meters relay	3rd	
Men's	2024 Outdoor	Shaun Maswanganyi	4 × 100 meters relay	3rd	
Men's	2024 Outdoor	Christyan Sampy	Pole vault	3rd	
Women's	2024 Outdoor	Sydni Townsend	400 meters hurdles	5th	
Women's	2024 Outdoor	Sydni Townsend	4 × 400 meters relay	5th	
Women's	2024 Outdoor	Iman Babineaux	4 × 400 meters relay	5th	
Women's	2024 Outdoor	Kelly-Ann Beckford	4 × 400 meters relay	5th	
Women's	2024 Outdoor	Michaela Mouton	4 × 400 meters relay	5th	
Men's	2025 Indoor	Antrea Mita	High jump	8th	
Women's	2025 Indoor	KeAyla Dove	Shot put	3rd	
Men's	2025 Outdoor	John Adesola	110 meters hurdles	3rd	
Men's	2025 Outdoor	Jamar Marshall Jr.	110 meters hurdles	4th	
Men's	2025 Outdoor	Grant Levesque	Decathlon	5th	

== See also ==
- Category:Houston Cougars men's track and field athletes (43)
- Category:Houston Cougars women's track and field athletes (16)
