= 60 meters at the NCAA Division I Indoor Track and Field Championships =

This is a list of the NCAA Division I indoor champions in the 60 meters, 55 meters, or 60 yards. Generally the imperial distance was contested until 1983, the 55 meter dash was held from 1984 to 1999, and the 60 meters was contested thereafter. Hand timing was used until 1975, while starting in 1976 fully automatic timing was used.

== Women ==
Key
y = yards
* = 55 meters distance

Women's 60 yd, 55 m, and 60 m winners
Year	Athlete	Team	Time	Ref.
1983	Janet Burke (JAM)	Nebraska	6.75 y	
1984	Merlene Ottey (JAM)	Nebraska	6.70 *	
1985	Michelle Finn	Florida State	6.75 *	
1986	Gwen Torrence	Georgia	6.62 *	
1987	Gwen Torrence	Georgia	6.56 *	
1988	Carlette Guidry	Texas	6.72 *	
1989	Dawn Sowell	Louisiana State	6.62 *	
1990	Carlette Guidry	Texas	6.66 *	
1991	Carlette Guidry	Texas	6.74 *	
1992	Chryste Gaines	Stanford	6.68 *	
1993	Holli Hyche	Indiana State	6.76 *	
1994	Holli Hyche	Indiana State	6.70 *	
1995	Melinda Sergent	Texas El Paso	6.73 *	
1996	D'Andre Hill	Louisiana State	6.69 *	
1997	Savatheda Fynes (BAH)	Michigan State	6.65 *	
1998	Kwajalein Butler	Louisiana State	6.78 *	
1999	Debbie Ferguson (BAH)	Georgia	7.24	
2000	Tonya Carter	Florida State Seminoles	7.21	
2001	Monique Tubbs	Jacksonville	7.29	
2002	Angela Williams	Southern California	7.13	
2003	Muna Lee	Louisiana State	7.17	
2004	Muna Lee	Louisiana State	7.21	
2005	Fana Ashby (TRI)	Louisiana State	7.18	
2006	Marshevet Hooker	Texas	7.20	
2007	Kerron Stewart	Auburn	7.15	
2008	Kelly-Ann Baptiste	Louisiana State	7.17	
2009	Lakya Brookins	South Carolina Gamecocks	7.13	
2010	Blessing Okagbare	Texas El Paso	7.18	
2011	Lakya Brookins	South Carolina Gamecocks	7.09	
2012	English Gardner	Oregon	7.12	
2013	Aurieyall Scott	Central Florida	7.13	
2014	Remona Burchell (JAM)	Alabama	7.11 A	
2015	Remona Burchell (JAM)	Alabama	7.12	
2016	Teahna Daniels	Texas	7.11	
2017	Hannah Cunliffe	Oregon	7.14	
2018	Aleia Hobbs	Louisiana State	7.07	
2019	TeeTee Terry	Southern California	7.14	
2021	Kemba Nelson (JAM)	Oregon	7.05	
2022	Melissa Jefferson	Coastal Carolina	7.09	
2023	Julien Alfred (LCA)	Texas	6.94	
2024	Brianna Lyston (JAM)	Louisiana State	7.03	
2025	Dajaz DeFrand	USC	7.09	
2026	Shenese Walker (JAM)	Florida State	7.08	

== Men ==
Key
y=yards
w=wind aided
A=Altitude assisted

=== 60 yards ===
Year	Name, (Country)	Team	Time
1965	Charles Greene	Nebraska	6.1
1966	Charles Greene	Nebraska	6.0
1967	Charles Greene	Nebraska	6.0
1968	Jim Green	Kentucky	6.0
1969	John Carlos	San Jose St	6.0
1970	Herb Washington	Michigan St	6.1
1971	Jim Green	Kentucky	6.0
1972	Herb Washington	Michigan St	6.1
1973	Gerald Tinker	Kent	6.0
1974	Clifford Outlin	Auburn	6.0
1975	Hasely Crawford Trinidad and Tobago	Eastern Mich	6.0
1976	Harvey Glance	Auburn	6.21
1977	Greg Edmond	Houston	6.15
1978	Curtis Dickey	Texas A&M	6.15
1979	Curtis Dickey	Texas A&M	6.15
1980	Curtis Dickey	Texas A&M	6.12
1981	Carl Lewis	Houston	6.16
1982	Rod Richardson	Texas A&M	6.07
1983	Willie Gault	Tennessee	6.17

=== 55 meters ===
Year	Name, (Country)	Team	Time
1984	Rod Richardson	Texas A&M	6.14
1985	Sam Graddy	Tennessee	6.12
1986	Lee McRae	Pittsburgh	6.00
1987	Lee McRae	Pittsburgh	6.13
1988	Lee McRae	Pittsburgh	6.07
1989	Ray Stewart Jamaica	Texas Christian	6.07
1990	Andre Cason	Texas A&M	6.07
1991	Augustin Olobia Nigeria	Wash St	6.17
1992	Michael Green Jamaica	Clemson	6.08
1993	Michael Green Jamaica	Clemson	6.15
1994	Greg Saddler	Mississippi	6.11
1995	Tim Harden	Kentucky	6.12
1996	Tim Harden	Kentucky	6.06
1997	Bryan Howard	Auburn	6.19
1998	Ja'Warren Hooker	Washington	6.13

=== 60 meters ===
Men's 60 meters winners
Year	Name, (Country)	Team	Time
1999	Leonard Scott	Tennessee	6.58
2000	Terrence Trammell	South Carolina	6.54
2001	Kim Collins Saint Kitts and Nevis	TCU	6.58
2002	Justin Gatlin	Tennessee	6.59
2003	Pierre Browne (CAN) (Note: Julien Dunkley of the East Carolina Pirates track and field team originally won the race in 6.54 seconds, but he was later declared ineligible.)	Mississippi St.	6.60
2004	DaBryan Blanton	Oklahoma	6.59
2005	DaBryan Blanton	Oklahoma	6.58
2006	Jacob Norman	Baylor	6.56
2007	Travis Padgett	Clemson	6.56
2008	Richard Thompson Trinidad and Tobago	LSU	6.51
2009	Jacoby Ford	Clemson	6.52
2010	Jeff Demps	Florida	6.57
2011	Jeff Demps	Florida	6.53
2012	Jeff Demps	Florida	6.56
2013	D'Angelo Cherry	Mississippi St.	6.54
2014	Dentarius Locke	FSU	6.52
2015	Ronnie Baker	TCU	6.52
2016	Ronnie Baker	TCU	6.47
2017	Christian Coleman	Tennessee	6.45
2018	Elijah Hall	Houston	6.52
2019	Grant Holloway	Florida	6.50
2021	Micah Williams	Oregon	6.49
2022	Davonte Burnett	USC Trojans	6.50
2023	Terrence Jones	Texas Tech Red Raiders	6.46
2024	Terrence Jones	Texas Tech Red Raiders	6.54
2025	Jordan Anthony	Arkansas	6.49
2026	Kanyinsola Ajayi (JAM)	Auburn Tigers	6.45
