= Central Michigan Chippewas track and field =

American college track and field team

- University: Central Michigan University
- Head coach: Jenny Swieton
- Conference: MAC
- Location: Mount Pleasant, Michigan
- Outdoor track: Lyle Bennett Outdoor Track
- Nickname: Chippewas
- Colors: Maroon and gold

The Central Michigan Chippewas track and field team is the track and field program that represents Central Michigan University. The Chippewas compete in NCAA Division I as a member of the Mid-American Conference. The team is based in Mount Pleasant, Michigan, at the Lyle Bennett Outdoor Track.

The program is coached by Jenny Swieton. The track and field program officially encompasses four teams because the NCAA considers men's and women's indoor track and field and outdoor track and field as separate sports.

The men's teams were cut in May 2020, with athletic director Michael Alford citing budgetary reasons and the COVID-19 pandemic. In September 2021, the ACLU of Michigan wrote a letter to the school urging them to re-instate the program. In April 2022, the United States Office for Civil Rights announced they were investigating the cuts to determine if they discriminated against African American students. The investigation came after the school announced they would revive a golf team later that year.

== Postseason ==
=== AIAW ===
The Chippewas have had one AIAW All-American finishing in the top six at the AIAW indoor or outdoor championships.

AIAW All-Americans
Championships	Name	Event	Place
1970 Outdoor	Karen Lehman	440 yards	4th

=== NCAA ===
As of August 2025, a total of 17 men and 4 women have achieved individual first-team All-American status for the team at the Division I men's outdoor, women's outdoor, men's indoor, or women's indoor national championships (using the modern criteria of top-8 placing regardless of athlete nationality).

First team NCAA All-Americans
Team	Championships	Name	Event	Place	Ref.
Men's	1928 Outdoor	Jack Cline	High jump	4th	
Men's	1944 Outdoor	Warren Giese	Long jump	6th	
Men's	1954 Outdoor	Jim Podoley	Long jump	7th	
Men's	1954 Outdoor	Jim Podoley	220 yards hurdles	7th	
Men's	1960 Outdoor	Dave Myers	400 meters	4th	
Men's	1976 Outdoor	Mike Winsor	High jump	2nd	
Men's	1977 Outdoor	Bruno Pauletto	Shot put	5th	
Men's	1978 Indoor	Steve Banovic	1000 meters	5th	
Men's	1978 Indoor	Bruno Pauletto	Shot put	1st	
Men's	1978 Outdoor	Barry Alexia	400 meters hurdles	8th	
Men's	1978 Outdoor	Bruno Pauletto	Shot put	2nd	
Men's	1989 Outdoor	Geoff Goolsby	10,000 meters	6th	
Women's	1991 Outdoor	Karen Wilkinson	Javelin throw	8th	
Men's	1998 Indoor	Samuel Okantey	Triple jump	5th	
Men's	1999 Outdoor	Greg Richardson	110 meters hurdles	3rd	
Men's	2000 Indoor	Greg Richardson	60 meters hurdles	7th	
Women's	2002 Indoor	Suzy Bozin	High jump	6th	
Women's	2002 Outdoor	Suzy Bozin	High jump	5th	
Men's	2004 Indoor	Johnie Drake	60 meters	8th	
Men's	2005 Indoor	Pierre Vinson	60 meters	5th	
Men's	2005 Outdoor	Steve Wolf	High jump	3rd	
Women's	2006 Indoor	Tamera Thomas	Pentathlon	8th	
Men's	2008 Indoor	Abraham Mach	800 meters	8th	
Men's	2009 Outdoor	Greg Pilling	Discus throw	8th	
Men's	2011 Outdoor	Alex Rose	Discus throw	5th	
Women's	2019 Indoor	Nadia Williams	Long jump	6th	

== See also ==
- Category:Central Michigan Chippewas men's track and field athletes (7)
- Category:Central Michigan Chippewas track and field coaches (2)
