= Brian Stanton =

Brian Stanton may refer to:

- Brian Stanton (footballer) (born 1956), English former footballer
- Brian Stanton (high jumper) (born 1961), American high jumper
