= Anthony Ketchum =

American sprinter (born 1962)

Personal information
- Born: November 20, 1962 (age 64) Needville, Texas, United States

Sport
- Sport: Track and field
Medal record
Representing United States
Summer Universiade
Gold medal – first place	1981 Bucharest	4×100 m relay
Silver medal – second place	1981 Bucharest	4x400m relay
IAAF World Cup
Bronze medal – third place	1981 Rome	4×100 m relay

Anthony Raye Ketchum (born November 20, 1962) is an American former sprinter.

He attended Needville High School in Texas and in 1981 set a state high school record for the 400-meter dash, with a time of 45.64 seconds. He was highly successful at school level, winning four straight titles in the 440-yard dash/400-meter dash from 1978 to 1981 at the UIL Texas State Track and Field Championships (the second man to do so after Kenneth Thomas of Wortham). He was the number one ranked high school athlete in the discipline in 1981 according to Track and Field News.

Ketchum placed fifth nationally in the 400 m at the 1981 USA Outdoor Track and Field Championships and also fourth at the AAA Championships in the United Kingdom. His season's best of 45.69 seconds ranked him 26th globally. He was runner-up at the USA Junior Track and Field Championships in the 100-meter dash, taking second to Darren Walker. During this period he was coached by Jack Petty.

He made his first appearances at international level in 1981. At the 1981 IAAF World Cup, his performance in the 4×100-meter relay alongside Mel Lattany, Stanley Floyd and Steve Williams brought the United States team the bronze medal. A gold medal in that event also came at that year's Universiade, as the American team of Lattany, Ketchum, Jason Grimes and Calvin Smith topped the podium.

After graduating from high school, he began to attend the University of Houston and was coached by Tom Tellez as part of the institution's high calibre Houston Cougars track team (which had recently featured Carl Lewis). In his first year, he won the 440-yard dash title at the NCAA Men's Indoor Track and Field Championships, recording a time of 47.47 seconds to take his first collegiate title. Outdoors, he helped the team's 4 × 100 m relay quartet (including Carlton Young, Mark McNeil, and Stanley Floyd) to a world under-23 best time for the event in 38.53 seconds. Ketchum claimed the relay title with the Cougars at the 1982 NCAA Men's Outdoor Track and Field Championships in an American collegiate record of 39:12 seconds. His best individual run of 45.72 seconds that year ranked him in the top 40 globally.

He only competed at the start of the 1983, his best of 45.77 seconds coming at the Mt. SAC Relays, where he was runner-up. At this point he started to focus on playing American football instead. Ketchum played for the Houston Cougars football team from 1983 to 1985 as a wide receiver and kickoff returner. He played three games professionally for the Hamilton Tiger-Cats, briefly staying at the Canadian football team in the 1987 season. Towards the end of his career, he was part of the Detroit Lions team in the late 1980s, but was released in 1980.
