= Cletus Clark =

American hurdler

Personal information
- Nationality: American
- Born: January 20, 1962 (age 64) Houston, Texas, United States

Sport
- Country: United States
- Sport: Track and Field
- Event: 110 m hurdles
- College team: Houston Cougars
- Club: Santa Monica Track Club
Medal record
Men's athletics
Representing the United States
Pan American Games
Gold medal – first place	1991 Havana	110 m hurdles
Summer Universiade
Gold medal – first place	1985 Kobe	110 m hurdles
Silver medal – second place	1987 Zagreb	110 m hurdles

Cletus Clark (born January 20, 1962) is a retired male hurdler from the United States, best known for winning the gold medal in the men's 110 metres hurdles at the 1991 Pan American Games.

Clark was an All-American hurdler for the Houston Cougars track and field team, finishing runner-up in the 55 meters hurdles at the 1984 NCAA Indoor Track and Field Championships.

== Achievements ==
Year	Competition	Venue	Position	Event
1985	Summer Universiade	Kobe, Japan	1st	110 m hurdles
1987	Summer Universiade	Zagreb, Yugoslavia	2nd	110 m hurdles
1991	Pan American Games	Havana, Cuba	1st	110 m hurdles
