= Aleksandr Shablenko =

Soviet decathlete

Personal information
- Born: 31 October 1957 (age 68)
Medal record
Men's athletics
Representing Soviet Union
Summer Universiade
Gold medal – first place	1981 Bucharest	Decathlon

Aleksandr Shablenko (born 31 October 1957) is a retired decathlete who competed for the Soviet Union during his career. He set his personal best in the event (8294 points) on 1 June 1980 at a meet in Potsdam.
