= Chris Dunn (athlete) =

American high jumper

Personal information
- Born: May 7, 1951 (age 75) Boston, Massachusetts, United States
- Height: 196 cm (6 ft 5 in)
- Weight: 86 kg (190 lb)

Sport
- Sport: Athletics
- Event: High jump
- Club: Delaware Track & Field Club

Christopher Williams Dunn (born May 7, 1951) is an American athlete. He attended Newark High School and Colgate University and competed in the men's high jump at the 1972 Summer Olympics. He was inducted into the Delaware Sports Hall of Fame in 1989.

Dunn won the British AAA Championships title in the high jump event at the 1973 AAA Championships.
