= Brian Stanton (high jumper) =

American high jumper (born 1961)

Personal information
- Nationality: American
- Born: 19 February 1961 (age 64) Los Angeles, California, USa
- Height: 196 cm (6 ft 5 in)
- Weight: 82 kg (181 lb)

Sport
- Sport: Athletics
- Event: High jump
- Club: Stars and Stripes Track Club

Brian E. Stanton (born February 19, 1961) is an American high jumper who competed at the 1988 Summer Olympics. During his junior year at the University of Houston, he also appeared on The Price is Right.

== Biography ==
Stanton was an NCAA champion high jumper for the Houston Cougars track and field team, winning the high jump at the 1983 NCAA Indoor Track and Field Championships.

Stanton finished second behind Canadian Milt Ottey in the high jump event at the British 1985 AAA Championships.

He represented his home country in the men's high jump event at the 1988 Olympic Games, where he finished 11th in the final, jumping 2.31m. He also jumped his personal record of 2.34m that same year.

In March 1996, at the age of 35, Stanton jumped 2.20m at the Long Beach Relays, a mark which is superior to the listed American masters M35 record of 2.15m by Jim Barrineau. Stanton's mark has never been ratified. His mark was equaled by Doug Nordquist three months later on the same track and bested by Charles Austin indoors seven years later; neither of these marks was ratified.

On March 2, 1983, Stanton appeared on The Price is Right, winning a total of $9,539 in cash and prizes.
