= Sheddric Fields =

Former American long jumper

Sheddric Fields (born April 13, 1973) is a retired American record-setting long jumper. During his senior year of high school, he was named the 1991–92 Gatorade National High School Boys Track & Field Athlete of the Year.

== High school athletics ==
Fields grew up in Dallas, where he graduated from South Oak Cliff High School in 1992. In high school, he set a national youth record in the long jump. As of 2021, he still has the 3rd longest long jump in U.S. high school history (26-8½ feet). He was rated by Track and Field News to be the top high school long jumper in the country during his junior and senior years, and he was named a high school All American both years. Fields also had the longest triple jump in Texas during his senior year.

For his records in the long jump, Fields was named the 1991–92 Gatorade National Boys Track & Field Player of the Year.

Fields also played defensive back for the South Oak Cliff football team.

== College athletics ==
Fields was recruited to run track at the University of Houston.

At Houston, Fields was twice named an NCAA Division I All American in the long jump.

== After athletics ==
Fields has worked for the U.S. Postal Service since graduation.

He and Tamny Fields have 3 children, including Jayla, who, as of 2021, is an all conference sprinter at Northwestern State University. She is now a member of the University of Houston track and field team.
