= Dentarius Locke =

American track and field sprinter (born 1989)

Personal information
- Born: December 12, 1989 (age 36) Tampa, Florida, U.S.
- Education: Chamberlain High School
- Height: 5 ft 7 in (170 cm)
- Weight: 150 lb (68 kg)

Sport
- Sport: Running
- Events: 100 meters, 200 meters
- College team: Florida State Seminoles
- Club: Nike
- Coached by: Bob Braman

Dentarius Locke (born December 12, 1989) is an American track and field sprinter. He has broken the 10-second barrier and has a personal best of 9.96 seconds. He competed collegiately for Florida State University, and previously ran for Nike.

== Career ==
As a prep at Chamberlain High School in Tampa, Florida, Dentarius was a two time All-American and finished his stellar career as the Florida State record holder in both the 100 meters (10.32; +0.9) and 200 meters (20.58; +0.9). He also captured the Nike Outdoor Championship 100 meters (10.59;-3.2) and 200 meters (20.87;+3.2). In his junior year, 2008, Dentarius placed first in the 100 and 200 at district (10.77/21.46) region (10.70/21.40) and at the 4A state championship placed first in the 100 meters (10.72; -2.1) and second in the 200 (21.02; +0.6). A month later at the Nike Outdoor Nationals (Greensboro, NC), Locke placed 2nd in both the 100 meters (10.60; -0.6) and the 200 meters (21.52; -2.2) and later that summer won both events at the AAU Nationals (10.49/21.03).

=== Seminoles ===
Locke took a redshirt during the 2012 collegiate year after transferring from the University of Tennessee in August 2011. In his only year of competition as a Volunteer, Locke earned All-American status in the Outdoor 200 meters (20.91;+2.6) and Indoor 60 meters (6.67). For his performance during the 2011 season Locke earned SEC Freshman of the Year. His personal records that year were 10.18w/10.25 in the 100 meters, 20.59 in the Outdoor 200 meters, 6.64 in the 60 meters, 21.02 in the Indoor 200 meters and 33.96 in the Indoor 300 meters. Locke was not allowed to participate during his freshman campaign at the University of Tennessee (2010) due to a ruling by the NCAA that Locke lacked 1.5 credits due to a course he completed online during his junior year taken through the Florida Education System.

In his first year competing for the Seminoles, and second year running collegiately, Locke placed 2nd at the ACC Indoor Championship in both the 60 meters (6.58) and 200 meters (21.02). Ranked second going into the NCAA Indoor Championships, Locked lowered his PR in the 60 meters with a time of 6.56 in the preliminary round. With a false start in the finals, Locke was disqualified; however he earned All-American status as a member of the Seminole record setting 4x400 team that placed 3rd.

Determined to establish himself as one of the elite collegiate sprinters, Locke earned ACC Outdoor Track Most Valuable Performer by placing first in the 100 meters (10.08/10.12; +1.6), second in the 200 (20.73; -0.4) and first as a member of the 4x100 relay team (39.49). At the NCAA East Qualifier Locke lowered his personal best during the 2nd round by placing second with a 10.05 (+1.6); 1st among legal wind times. A few weeks later at the NCAA Outdoor Championship Locke became only the 85th athlete to ever run sub 10 seconds crossing the line at 9.97 (+1.9); the fastest legal wind collegiate time in 2013. In the final, Locke placed second in 100 meters (9.91; +3.2) to earn his second All-American status of the outdoor campaign (4x100 relay).

=== 2013 nationals ===
Earning an "A" Standard in the 100 meters during the 2013 outdoor season, Locke entered the USA Track & Field Championships ranked 5th nationally with hopes of representing Team USA in the 2013 World Championships in Athletics. After a very windy 1st round, Locke captured the top time with a 10.183 against a headwind of -1.5. In the semi-final he would place 7th (9.97;+3.2) and would later place 6th in the final (10.05; +1.1) to earn a spot on the relay pool to represent Team USA in Moscow. Ultimately he did not compete and did not share in the United States silver medals.

Although Locke did not run with the USA relay team, he was invited and accepted to run at the Diamond League Herculis in Monaco. Against a field with Olympic gold medalist Justin Gatlin, US National champion Michael Rogers, European champion Jimmy Vicaut, and Jamaican Olympic gold medalist Nickel Ashmeade, Locke set a new personal best at 9.96 (-0.4) from lane 8 and finished second to Gatlin (9.94).
