= NCAA Division I Women's Indoor Track and Field Championships =

College-level athletic competition in the U.S.

- Current season, competition or edition: 2026 NCAA Division I Indoor Track and Field Championships
- Sport: College indoor track and field
- Founded: 1983; 43 years ago
- Country: United States
- Most recent champion: Georgia
- Most titles: LSU (11)
- Broadcaster: ESPNU
- Website: NCAA.com

The NCAA Women's Division I Indoor Track and Field Championship is an annual collegiate indoor track and field competition for women from Division I institutions organized by the National Collegiate Athletic Association. It has been held every year since 1983, except for 2020.

Athletes' performances in individual championships earn points for their institutions and the team with the most points receives the NCAA team title in track and field. A separate NCAA Division I men's competition is also held at the same time and venue; both are entirely separate events from the NCAA Women's Division I Outdoor Track and Field Championships and the NCAA Men's Division I Outdoor Track and Field Championships held during the spring.

The reigning team champions are the Georgia Bulldogs.

The LSU Lady Tigers hold the record for most team titles with 11.

== Events ==
=== Track events ===
- Sprint events
  - 60 meter dash (1983–present)
  - 200 meter dash (1983–present)
  - 400 meter dash (1983–present)
- Distance events
  - 800 meter run (1983–present)
  - Mile run (1965–present)
  - 3,000 meter run (1983–present)
  - 5,000 meter run (1983–present)
- Hurdle Events
  - 60 meter hurdles (1983–present)
- Relay events
  - 1,600 meter relay (1983–present)
  - Distance medley relay (1983–present)

=== Field events ===
- Jumping events
  - High jump (1983–present)
  - Pole vault (1995–present)
  - Long jump (1983–present)
  - Triple jump
- Throwing events
  - Shot put (1983–present)
  - Weight throw
- Multi-events
  - Pentathlon (2004–present)

== Champions ==
NCAA Women's Division I Indoor Track and Field Championships
Year	Site (University)	Host Arena	Championship Results			
Year	Site (University)	Host Arena	Winner	Points	Runners-Up	Points
1983; Details	Pontiac, Michigan	Pontiac Silverdome	Nebraska	47	Tennessee	44
1984; Details	Syracuse, New York	Carrier Dome	Nebraska	59	Tennessee	48
1985; Details	Syracuse, New York	Carrier Dome	Florida State	34	Texas	32
1986; Details	Oklahoma City	Myriad Convention Center	Texas	31	USC; Tennessee	26; 26
1987; Details	Oklahoma City	Myriad Convention Center	LSU	49	Tennessee	30
1988; Details	Oklahoma City	Myriad Convention Center	Texas	31	Villanova	52
1989; Details	Indianapolis	Hoosier Dome	LSU	61	Villanova	34
1990; Details	Indianapolis	Hoosier Dome	Texas	50	Wisconsin	26
1991; Details	Indianapolis	Hoosier Dome	LSU	48	Texas	39
1992; Details	Indianapolis	Hoosier Dome	Florida	50	Stanford	26
1993; Details	Indianapolis	Hoosier Dome	LSU	49	Wisconsin	44
1994; Details	Indianapolis	Hoosier Dome	LSU	48	Alabama	29
1995; Details	Indianapolis	RCA Dome	LSU	40	UCLA	37
1996; Details	Indianapolis	RCA Dome	LSU	52	Georgia	34
1997; Details	Indianapolis	RCA Dome	LSU	49	Texas; Wisconsin	39; 39
1998; Details	Indianapolis	RCA Dome	Texas	60	LSU	30
1999; Details	Indianapolis	RCA Dome	Texas	61	LSU	57
2000; Details	Fayetteville, Arkansas (Arkansas)	Randal Tyson Track Center	UCLA	51	South Carolina	41
2001; Details	Fayetteville, Arkansas (Arkansas)	Randal Tyson Track Center	UCLA	53½	South Carolina	40
2002; Details	Fayetteville, Arkansas (Arkansas)	Randal Tyson Track Center	LSU	57	UCLA	43
2003; Details	Fayetteville, Arkansas (Arkansas)	Randal Tyson Track Center	LSU	62	Florida; South Carolina	44; 44
2004; Details	Fayetteville, Arkansas (Arkansas)	Randal Tyson Track Center	LSU	52	Florida	51
2005; Details	Fayetteville, Arkansas (Arkansas)	Randal Tyson Track Center	Tennessee	46	Florida	36
2006; Details	Fayetteville, Arkansas (Arkansas)	Randal Tyson Track Center	Texas	51	Stanford	36
2007; Details	Fayetteville, Arkansas (Arkansas)	Randal Tyson Track Center	Arizona State	38	LSU	33
2008; Details	Fayetteville, Arkansas (Arkansas)	Randal Tyson Track Center	Arizona State	51	LSU	43
2009; Details	College Station, Texas (Texas A&M)	Gilliam Indoor Track Stadium	Tennessee	42	Texas A&M	37
2010; Details	Fayetteville, Arkansas (Arkansas)	Randal Tyson Track Center	Oregon	61	Tennessee	36
2011; Details	College Station, Texas (Texas A&M)	Gilliam Indoor Track Stadium	Oregon	67	Texas	38
2012; Details	Nampa, Idaho (Boise State)	Ford Idaho Center	Oregon	49	Kansas	30
2013; Details	Fayetteville, Arkansas (Arkansas)	Randal Tyson Track Center	Oregon	56	LSU	43
2014; Details	Albuquerque, New Mexico (New Mexico)	Albuquerque Convention Center	Oregon	44	Texas	43.5
2015; Details	Fayetteville, Arkansas (Arkansas)	Randal Tyson Track Center	Arkansas	63	Oregon	46.5
2016; Details	Birmingham, Alabama (Samford)	Birmingham CrossPlex	Oregon	53	Arkansas	50
2017; Details	College Station, Texas (Texas A&M)	Gilliam Indoor Track Stadium	Oregon	84	Georgia	33
2018; Details	College Station, Texas (Texas A&M)	Gilliam Indoor Track Stadium	Georgia	61	Arkansas	49
2019; Details	Birmingham, Alabama (UAB Blazers)	Birmingham CrossPlex	Arkansas	62	USC	51
2020; Details	Albuquerque, New Mexico (New Mexico)	Albuquerque Convention Center	Not held due to the coronavirus pandemic			
2021; Details	Fayetteville, Arkansas (Arkansas)	Randal Tyson Track Center	Arkansas	68	Texas A&M	57
2022; Details	Birmingham, Alabama	Birmingham CrossPlex	Florida	68	Texas	56
2023; Details	Albuquerque, New Mexico (New Mexico)	Albuquerque Convention Center	Arkansas	64	Texas	60
2024; Details	Boston, Massachusetts	The Track at New Balance	Arkansas	55	Florida	50
2025 Details	Virginia Beach, Virginia	Virginia Beach Sports Center	Oregon	55	Georgia	39
2026 Details	Fayetteville, Arkansas	Randal Tyson Track Center	Georgia	53	Oregon	44

== Future Venues ==
- March 12–13, 2027: Randal Tyson Track Center in Fayetteville, Arkansas
- March 10–13, 2028: The TRACK at New Balance in Boston, Massachusetts

== Team titles ==
Team	Titles	Year Won
LSU	11	1987, 1989, 1991, 1993, 1994, 1995, 1996, 1997, 2002, 2003, 2004
Oregon	8	2010, 2011, 2012, 2013, 2014, 2016, 2017, 2025
Texas	6	1986, 1988, 1990, 1998, 1999, 2006
Arkansas	5	2015, 2019, 2021, 2023, 2024
Arizona State	2	2007, 2008
Florida	2	1992, 2022
Georgia	2	2018, 2026
Nebraska	2	1983, 1984
Tennessee	2	2005, 2009
UCLA	2	2000, 2001
Florida State	1	1985

== Championship records ==
Event	Record	Athlete	School	Nationality	Date	Championships	Place	Ref.
60 m	6.94 A	Julien Alfred	Texas	Saint Lucia	11 March 2023	2023 Championships	Albuquerque, New Mexico	
200 m	22.01 A	Julien Alfred	Texas	Saint Lucia	11 March 2023	2023 Championships	Albuquerque, New Mexico	
400 m	49.24	Isabella Whittaker	Arkansas	United States	15 March 2025	2025 Championships	Virginia Beach, Virginia	
800 m	1:59.53	Juliette Whittaker	Stanford	United States	9 March 2024	2024 Championships	Boston, Massachusetts	
Mile	4:25.13	Maia Ramsden	Harvard	New Zealand	9 March 2024	2024 Championships	Boston, Massachusetts	
3000 m	8:36.61	Jane Hedengren	BYU	United States	14 March 2026	2026 Championships	Fayetteville, Arkansas	
5000 m	14:52.79	Parker Valby	Florida	United States	8 March 2024	2024 Championships	Boston, Massachusetts	
60 m hurdles	7.72 A	Ackera Nugent	Arkansas	Jamaica	10 March 2023	2023 Championships	Albuquerque, New Mexico	
High jump	2.00 m	Rachel Glenn	Arkansas	United States	9 March 2024	2024 Championships	Boston, Massachusetts	
Pole vault	4.82 m	Hana Moll	Washington	United States	14 March 2026	2026 Championships	Fayetteville, Arkansas	
Long jump	7.03 m A	Jasmine Moore	Florida	United States	10 March 2023	2023 Championships	Albuquerque, New Mexico	
Triple jump	15.12 m A	Jasmine Moore	Florida	United States	11 March 2023	2023 Championships	Albuquerque, New Mexico	
Shot put	19.56 m	Raven Saunders	Mississippi	United States	10 March 2017	2017 Championships	College Station, United States	
Weight throw	25.56 m	Brittany Riley	Southern Illinois	United States	10 March 2007	2007 Championships	Fayetteville, United States	
Pentathlon	4746 pts	Tyra Gittens	Texas A&M	Trinidad and Tobago	11 March 2021	2021 Championships	Fayetteville, United States	
Pentathlon	60m H / High jump / Shot put / Long jump / 800m; 8.27 / 1.93 m / 13.86 m / 6.58 m / 2:28.22							
4 × 400 m relay	3:21.75 A	Amber Anning 51.47; Joanne Reid 50.52; Rosey Effiong 50.57; Britton Wilson 49.20	Arkansas	England; Jamaica; United States; United States	11 March 2023	2023 Championships	Albuquerque, New Mexico	
Distance medley relay	10:45.34	Jenna Hutchins 3:21.61; Sami Oblad 52.10; Tessa Buswell 2:06.52; Riley Chamberlain 4:25.12	BYU	United States; United States; United States; United States	14 March 2025	2025 Championships	Virginia Beach, Virginia	

== See also ==
- NCAA Women's Indoor Track and Field Championship (Division II, Division III)
- AIAW Intercollegiate Women's Indoor Track and Field Champions
- NAIA Women's Indoor Track and Field Championship
- NCAA Men's Indoor Track and Field Championship (Division I, Division II, Division III)
- NCAA Women's Outdoor Track and Field Championship (Division I, Division II, Division III)
- NCAA Men's Outdoor Track and Field Championship (Division I, Division II, Division III)
