= Stanley Floyd =

American sprinter (born 1961)

Personal information
- Nationality: United States
- Born: June 23, 1961 (age 65)
- Height: 5 ft 10 in (178 cm)
- Weight: 170 lb (77 kg)

Sport
- Sport: Track & Field
- College team: Houston Cougars

Achievements and titles
- Personal bests: 100m: 10.03 200m; 20.41; 50m: 5.63; 55m; 6.05 60m; 6.59

Stanley Floyd (born June 23, 1961) is a retired track and field sprinter from the United States. He was a 1979 graduate of Dougherty High School in Albany, Georgia. In 1980, he was considered one of the favorites for the 100m title but was denied his chance due to the United States boycott of the 1980 Summer Olympics.

== Career ==
Floyd attended the University of Houston where he studied for a degree in communications. There he hoped to train towards Olympic success - originally he was aiming for 1984 not 1980 - before turning to American football to earn fame and fortune. He originally attended Auburn University, but left after a year.

In 1980 achieved the best time globally in the 100 metres, at 10.07 s. This time improved the World junior record (the record of Mel Lattany from 1978).

Floyd won the 100 m at the USA Olympic Trials for the 1980 Olympic team but did not compete due to the U.S. Olympic Committee's boycott of the 1980 Summer Olympics in Moscow, Russia. He had already won the NCAA and USA National Championships in the men's 100 metres. This was a triplet of wins last achieved 24 years previously in 1956 by Bobby Morrow. He was one of 461 athletes to receive a Congressional Gold Medal instead.

It is debatable whether Floyd would have beaten the eventual champion Allan Wells at the Olympics. He had the faster time for the year and in post-Olympic meetings he beat Wells by 2 to 1. However, Wells had agreed to meet the US athletes after the Olympics and won this psychologically important first meeting in Cologne, defeating Floyd, Mel Lattany, Carl Lewis and Harvey Glance. Additionally, Floyd suffered from declining form as his long season ended.

In 1981, Floyd became United States champion indoors at 60 m. Later in the year outdoors, Floyd was second in the US National Championships at 100 metres. He was thus reserve at the 1981 Athletics World Cup to Carl Lewis, and even warmed-up for the event in case Lewis was injured competing in the long jump, whose start preceded the 100 m scheduled run time by only 40 minutes. In the end he wasn't required to run, but in retrospect maybe he should have because Lewis was injured in the race and finished last. Also in 1981 he won the British AAA Championships title in the 200 metres event at the 1981 AAA Championships.

He had a scintillating 1982 indoor season, establishing world records at 50 yards ( 5.22 s), 60 yards (6.09 s), and 55 metres (6.10 s). Floyd's top performance in the 100 m occurred on June 5, 1982, when winning the 1982 NCAA 100 m title in Provo, Utah, where he clocked 10.03. This was the NCAA meet record until 1990.

Floyd in 1983 retired from track and field to try his luck at American football in the National Football League (NFL). At the time he has stated he felt he lacked the necessary motivation required to continue his sprinting career and try for another Olympics.

He achieved little success with American football - he was dropped by the Atlanta Falcons, then by the Los Angeles Express of the United States Football League (USFL), and then failed to make the cut with the Houston Oilers. So in 1987 he successfully fought for the right to run again as an athlete.

== Rankings ==
Floyd was ranked among the best in the US and the world in the 100 m sprint events over the period 1980 to 1987, according to the votes of the experts of Track and Field News.

Floyd also showed early promise as 200 m runner, and in 1981 was ranked seventh in the world and fifth in the US by those same experts of Track and Field News.

100 meters
Year	World rank	US rank
1980	1st	1st
1981	5th	4th
1982	4th	4th
1983	-	-
1984	-	-
1985	-	-
1986	-	-
1987	10th	5th

== Personal life ==
Floyd's wife, Delisa Walton-Floyd, was a former world-class middle-distance runner for Detroit-Mackenzie High School and the University of Tennessee. Walton-Floyd placed fifth in the 800 meter run at the 1988 Summer Olympics; her personal best (1:57.80) still ranks fifth all-time among American 800 meter runners.

Stanley and Delisa have two daughters, Ebonie and Kalyn. Ebonie, who is coached by her father, was an NCAA All-American sprinter at the University of Houston; producing the fourth fastest 200 meters (22.32) in the world during 2007. By virtue of her sixth-place finish (400 meters) at the 2008 US Olympic Trials, Ebonie earned a position on the Olympic Team as a member of the 4x400 meter relay squad. Younger sister, Kalyn Floyd, was a three-time All American sprinter for the University of Houston track team.

Floyd was accepted into the Georgia Sports Hall of Fame in 1981 and the Albany Sports Hall of Fame in 2001. After retiring again from athletics, Floyd became a police officer on the Houston Vice Squad. He is now retired from the police service and resides in Houston, Texas.

Records
Preceded by (United States) Mel Lattany	Men's World Junior Record Holder, 100 metres 24 May 1980 – 25 July 1997	Succeeded by (United Kingdom) Dwain Chambers
