= 1982 NCAA Indoor Track and Field Championships =

- Dates: March 12–13, 1982
- Host city: Pontiac, Michigan
- Venue: Pontiac Silverdome

The 1982 NCAA Indoor Track and Field Championships were contested March 12−13, 1982 at the Pontiac Silverdome in Pontiac, Michigan at the 18th annual NCAA-sanctioned track meet to determine the individual and team national champions of men's collegiate indoor track and field events in the United States. This was the first championship not hosted at Detroit's Cobo Arena, the venue of the previous 17 events.

This was the final year before the introduction of a woman's championship and events in 1983.

UTEP once again topped the team standings, finishing 37 points ahead of Arkansas. The Miners claimed their third consecutive and seventh overall indoor team title and their seventh title in nine seasons.

== Qualification ==
Unlike other NCAA-sponsored sports, there were not separate NCAA Division I, Division II, and Division III championships for indoor track and field until 1985. As such, all athletes and programs from all three divisions were eligible to compete.

== Team standings ==
- Note: Top 10 only
- Scoring: 6 points for a 1st-place finish, 4 points for 2nd, 3 points for 3rd, 2 points for 4th, and 1 point for 5th
- ^{(DC)} = Defending Champions
- Full results

Rank	Team	Points
1st place, gold medalist(s)	UTEP ^{(DC)}	67
2nd place, silver medalist(s)	Arkansas	30
3rd place, bronze medalist(s)	Villanova	28
4	SMU	24
5	Tennessee; Washington State	23
7	Houston	22
8	Indiana	20
9	Mississippi Valley State	18
10	Kansas State	16
