= NCAA Division I Indoor Track and Field Championships =

NCAA Division I Indoor Track and Field Championships may refer to:

- NCAA Men's Division I Indoor Track and Field Championships
- NCAA Women's Division I Indoor Track and Field Championships
