= 1996 NCAA Division I Indoor Track and Field Championships =

- Organisers: NCAA
- Edition: 32nd (Men); 14th (Women)
- Dates: March 8-9, 1996
- Host city: Indianapolis, Indiana
- Venue: RCA Dome
- Level: Division I

The 1996 NCAA Division I Indoor Track and Field Championships were contested to determine the individual and team national champions of men's and women's NCAA collegiate indoor track and field events in the United States after the 1995–96 season, the 32nd annual meet for men and 14th annual meet for women.

The championships were again held at the RCA Dome in Indianapolis, Indiana.

George Mason claimed the men's team title, the Patriots' first. This was the first men's championship since 1983 not won by Arkansas.

Three-time defending champions LSU again won the women's team title, the Lady Tigers' seventh.

== Qualification ==
All teams and athletes from Division I indoor track and field programs were eligible to compete for this year's individual and team titles.

== Team standings ==
- Note: Top 10 only
- Scoring: 6 points for a 1st-place finish in an event, 4 points for 2nd, 3 points for 3rd, 2 points for 4th, and 1 point for 5th
- (DC) = Defending Champions

=== Men's title ===
- 60 teams scored at least one point

Rank	Team	Points
1st place, gold medalist(s)	George Mason	39
2nd place, silver medalist(s)	Nebraska	31.5
3rd place, bronze medalist(s)	Arkansas (DC)	29
4	Houston	24.5
T5	Baylor	24
T5	UTEP	24
T7	Kentucky	22
T7	Oklahoma	22
T9	LSU	20.5
T9	UCLA	20.5

=== Women's title ===
- 53 teams scored at least one point

Rank	Team	Points
1st place, gold medalist(s)	LSU (DC)	52
2nd place, silver medalist(s)	Georgia	34
3rd place, bronze medalist(s)	Texas	31
T4	Florida	28
T4	Nebraska	28
6	Illinois	27.5
T7	Georgetown	22
T7	UCLA	22
9	Wisconsin	20
T10	North Carolina	19
T10	South Carolina	19
T10	Villanova	19
