= 1985 NCAA Division I Indoor Track and Field Championships =

- Dates: March 8–9, 1985
- Host city: (New York (state)) Syracuse, New York
- Venue: Carrier Dome

The 1985 NCAA Division I Indoor Track and Field Championships were contested March 8−9, 1985 at the Carrier Dome at Syracuse University in Syracuse, New York to determine the individual and team national champions of men's and women's NCAA collegiate indoor track and field events in the United States. These were the 21st annual men's championships and the 3rd annual women's championships.

On the men's side, defending champions Arkansas claimed the team title, the Razorbacks' second. This would ultimately be the second of twelve straight titles for Arkansas. For the women, Florida State topped the team standings, claiming the Seminoles' first title.

This was the first championship held only for Division I programs. The inaugural Division II championship (for men and women) was held at North Dakota State University in Fargo, North Dakota while the Division III event (also for men and women) was hosted by Bates College in Lewiston, Maine.

== Qualification ==
With the establishment of separate championships for Division II and III for the 1984–85 season, only athletes from Division I indoor track and field programs were eligible to compete for this year's individual and team titles.

== Team standings ==
- Note: Top 10 only
- Scoring: 6 points for a 1st-place finish in an event, 4 points for 2nd, 3 points for 3rd, 2 points for 4th, and 1 point for 5th
- (DC) = Defending Champions
- Full results

=== Men's title ===
Rank	Team	Points
1st place, gold medalist(s)	Arkansas (DC)	70
2nd place, silver medalist(s)	Tennessee	29
3rd place, bronze medalist(s)	Baylor	25
4	SMU	23
5	Georgetown	20
6	UTEP	19
7	BYU	18
8	Villanova	17
9	Georgia Tech; San José State	14

=== Women's title ===
Rank	Team	Points
1st place, gold medalist(s)	Florida State	34
2nd place, silver medalist(s)	Texas	32
3rd place, bronze medalist(s)	LSU	28
4	Nebraska (DC)	26
5	Grambling State	24
6	Tennessee	22
7	Houston; Indiana; Rice	20
10	Washington State	18
