= 1986 NCAA Division I Indoor Track and Field Championships =

- Dates: March 14–15, 1986
- Host city: Oklahoma City, Oklahoma
- Venue: Myriad Convention Center

The 1986 NCAA Division I Indoor Track and Field Championships were contested March 14−15, 1986 at the Myriad Convention Center in Oklahoma City, Oklahoma to determine the individual and team national champions of men's and women's NCAA collegiate indoor track and field events in the United States. These were the 22nd annual men's championships and the 4th annual women's championships.

Two-time defending champions Arkansas claimed the men's team title, the Razorbacks' third overall title and, ultimately, the third of twelve straight titles for Arkansas. Texas, meanwhile, claimed their first women's team title, topping the team standings by five points.

The Alabama Crimson Tide track and field team originally won the women's team title with a total of 41 points. However, in May 1986 Liz Lynch's mile championship title and 3000 m runner-up placing were vacated due to accepting prize money at a 10K run in Tupelo, Mississippi earlier that month. The disqualifications subtracted 18 points from Alabama's score, leaving them in 5th place.

== Qualification ==
All teams and athletes from Division I indoor track and field programs were eligible to compete for this year's individual and team titles.

== Team standings ==
- Note: Top 10 only
- Scoring: 6 points for a 1st-place finish in an event, 4 points for 2nd, 3 points for 3rd, 2 points for 4th, and 1 point for 5th
- (DC) = Defending Champions
- Full results

=== Men's title ===
Rank	Team	Points
1st place, gold medalist(s)	Arkansas (DC)	49
2nd place, silver medalist(s)	Villanova	22
3rd place, bronze medalist(s)	Boston University; Georgetown	20
5	Pittsburgh; Texas; Washington State	18
8	Houston; SMU	16
10	Tennessee	14

=== Women's title ===
Rank	Team	Points
1st place, gold medalist(s)	Texas	31
2nd place, silver medalist(s)	USC; Tennessee	26
4	LSU	24
5	Alabama	23
6	Florida State (DC)	16
7	Kansas State	14
8	Arizona; Arizona State; Kentucky	12
