= 2019 NCAA Division I Indoor Track and Field Championships =

College track and field competition

- Dates: March 8–9, 2019
- Host city: Birmingham, Alabama
- Venue: Birmingham CrossPlex
- Events: 34

The 2019 NCAA Division I Indoor Track and Field Championships was the 55th NCAA Men's Division I Indoor Track and Field Championships and the 38th NCAA Women's Division I Indoor Track and Field Championships, held at the Birmingham CrossPlex in Birmingham, Alabama near the campus of the host school, the University of Alabama at Birmingham. In total, thirty-four different men's and women's indoor track and field events were contested from March 8 to March 9, 2019.

The Florida Gators, representing the University of Florida, with 26 points earned by sprinter, hurdler, long jumper Grant Holloway alone, won the men's championship, while the Arkansas Razorbacks, representing the University of Arkansas, won the women's championship.

== Television coverage ==
ESPN3 and NCAA.org broadcast the championships.

== Results ==
=== Men's results ===
==== 60 meters ====
- Final results shown, not prelims

| Rank | Name | University | Time | Team score |
|---|---|---|---|---|
| 1st place, gold medalist(s) | Grant Holloway | Florida | 6.50 | 10 |
| 2nd place, silver medalist(s) | Mario Burke Barbados | Houston | 6.55 | 8 |
| 3rd place, bronze medalist(s) | Hakim Sani Brown Japan | Florida | 6.55 | 6 |
| 4 | Cravon Gillespie | Oregon | 6.57 | 5 |
| 5 | Bryand Rincher | Florida State | 6.60 | 4 |
| 6 | Ryan Clark | Florida | 6.61 | 3 |
| 7 | Divine Oduduru Nigeria | Texas Tech | 6.62 | 2 |
| 8 | Kasaun James | Florida State | 6.67 | 1 |

==== 200 meters ====
- Final results shown, not prelims

| Rank | Name | University | Time | Team score |
|---|---|---|---|---|
| 1st place, gold medalist(s) | Divine Oduduru Nigeria | Texas Tech | 20.49 | 10 |
| 2nd place, silver medalist(s) | Kasaun James | Florida State | 20.56 | 8 |
| 3rd place, bronze medalist(s) | Keitavious Walter | Alabama | 20.76 | 6 |
| 4 | Nick Gray | Ohio State | 20.76 | 5 |
| 5 | Jaron Flournoy | LSU | 20.82 | 4 |
| 6 | Karayme Bartley Jamaica | Iowa | 20.97 | 3 |
| 7 | McKinely West | Southern Miss | 21.12 | 2 |
| 8 | Obi Igbokwe | Houston | 21.23 | 1 |

==== 400 meters ====
- Final results shown, not prelims

| Rank | Name | University | Time | Team score |
|---|---|---|---|---|
| 1st place, gold medalist(s) | Tyrell Richard | South Carolina State | 44.82 | 10 |
| 2nd place, silver medalist(s) | Kahmari Montgomery | Houston | 45.03 | 8 |
| 3rd place, bronze medalist(s) | Wil London | Baylor | 45.16 | 6 |
| 4 | Quincy Hall | South Carolina | 45.25 | 5 |
| 5 | Obi Igbokwe | Houston | 46.04 | 4 |
| 6 | Jhon Perlaza Colombia | Liberty | 46.07 AR | 3 |
| 7 | Benjamin Lobo Vedel Denmark | Florida | 46.07 | 2 |
| 8 | Derrick Mokaleng South Africa | TCU | 46.22 | 1 |

==== 800 meters ====
- Final results shown, not prelims

| Rank | Name | University | Time | Team score |
|---|---|---|---|---|
| 1st place, gold medalist(s) | Bryce Hoppel | Kansas | 1:46.46 | 10 |
| 2nd place, silver medalist(s) | Marco Arop Canada | Mississippi State | 1:47.00 | 8 |
| 3rd place, bronze medalist(s) | Robert Heppenstall Canada | Wake Forest | 1:47.45 | 6 |
| 4 | Devin Dixon | Texas A&M | 1:47.54 | 5 |
| 5 | Cooper Williams | Indiana | 1:47.69 | 4 |
| 6 | Joseph White | Georgetown | 1:48.19 | 3 |
| 7 | Michael Rhoads | Air Force | 1:48.49 | 2 |
| 8 | Domenic Perretta | Penn State | 1:48.81 | 1 |

==== Mile ====
- Final results shown, not prelims

| Rank | Name | University | Time | Team score |
|---|---|---|---|---|
| 1st place, gold medalist(s) | Geordie Beamish New Zealand | Northern Arizona | 4:07.69 | 10 |
| 2nd place, silver medalist(s) | Casey Comber | Villanova | 4:08.03 | 8 |
| 3rd place, bronze medalist(s) | Oliver Hoare Australia | Wisconsin | 4:08.14 | 6 |
| 4 | Carlos Villarreal Mexico | Arizona | 4:08.41 | 5 |
| 5 | William Paulson Canada | Arizona State | 4:08.45 | 4 |
| 6 | Sam Worley | Texas | 4:09.20 | 3 |
| 7 | Derek Gutierrez | Ole Miss | 4:09.28 | 2 |
| 8 | Charlie Hunter Australia | Oregon | 4:09.36 | 1 |

==== 3000 meters ====
- Final results shown, not prelims

| Rank | Name | University | Time | Team score |
|---|---|---|---|---|
| 1st place, gold medalist(s) | Morgan McDonald Australia | Wisconsin | 7:52.85 | 10 |
| 2nd place, silver medalist(s) | Grant Fisher | Stanford | 7:53.15 | 8 |
| 3rd place, bronze medalist(s) | Joe Klecker | Colorado | 7:54.34 | 6 |
| 4 | Cooper Teare | Oregon | 7:55.50 | 5 |
| 5 | Alex Ostberg | Stanford | 7:55.62 | 4 |
| 6 | Clayton Young | BYU | 7:55.86 | 3 |
| 7 | Conner Mantz | BYU | 7:56.72 | 2 |
| 8 | Robert Brandt | UCLA | 7:56.75 | 1 |

==== 5000 meters ====
- Final results shown, not prelims

| Rank | Name | University | Time | Team score |
|---|---|---|---|---|
| 1st place, gold medalist(s) | Morgan McDonald Australia | Wisconsin | 13:41.76 | 10 |
| 2nd place, silver medalist(s) | Joe Klecker | Colorado | 13:42.79 | 8 |
| 3rd place, bronze medalist(s) | Clayton Young | BYU | 13:45.35 | 6 |
| 4 | Connor McMillan | BYU | 13:46.88 | 5 |
| 5 | Vincent Kiprop Kenya | Alabama | 13:47.38 | 4 |
| 6 | Amon Kemboi Kenya | Campbell | 13:47.44 | 3 |
| 7 | Ben Veatch | Indiana | 13:49.50 | 2 |
| 8 | Robert Brandt | UCLA | 13:50.74 | 1 |

==== 60 meter hurdles ====
- Final results shown, not prelims

| Rank | Name | University | Time | Team score |
|---|---|---|---|---|
| 1st place, gold medalist(s) | Grant Holloway | Florida | 7.35 | 10 |
| 2nd place, silver medalist(s) | Daniel Roberts | Kentucky | 7.41 | 8 |
| 3rd place, bronze medalist(s) | Trey Cunningham | Florida State | 7.64 | 6 |
| 4 | Amere Lattin | Houston | 7.77 | 5 |
| 5 | John Burt | Texas | 7.80 | 4 |
| 6 | Chris Douglas | Iowa | 7.83 | 3 |
| 7 | Caleb Parker | Southern Miss | 7.87 | 2 |
| 8 | Isaiah Moore | South Carolina | 7.87 | 1 |

==== 4 × 400 meters relay ====
- Final results shown, not prelims

| Rank | University | Time | Team score |
|---|---|---|---|
| 1st place, gold medalist(s) | Houston | 3:05.04 | 10 |
| 2nd place, silver medalist(s) | Texas A&M | 3:05.15 | 8 |
| 3rd place, bronze medalist(s) | Florida | 3:05.24 | 6 |
| 4 | Arkansas | 3:06.82 | 5 |
| 5 | South Carolina | 3:07.48 | 4 |
| 6 | Iowa | 3:07.68 | 3 |
| 7 | TCU | 3:08.61 | 2 |
| 8 | Baylor | 3:08.63 | 1 |

==== Distance medley relay ====
- Final results shown, not prelims

| Rank | University | Time | Team score |
|---|---|---|---|
| 1st place, gold medalist(s) | Notre Dame | 9:31.55 | 10 |
| 2nd place, silver medalist(s) | Stanford | 9:31.70 | 8 |
| 3rd place, bronze medalist(s) | Georgetown | 9:33.06 | 6 |
| 4 | Indiana | 9:33.11 | 5 |
| 5 | Iowa State | 9:33.86 | 4 |
| 6 | Arkansas | 9:33.97 | 3 |
| 7 | Wisconsin | 9:34.74 | 2 |
| 8 | Ole Miss | 9:35.45 | 1 |

==== High jump ====
- Final results shown, not prelims

| Rank | Name | University | Best Jump | Team score |
|---|---|---|---|---|
| 1st place, gold medalist(s) | Shelby McEwen | Alabama | 2.29 m (7 ft 6 in) | 10 |
| 2nd place, silver medalist(s) | Darryl Sullivan | Tennessee | 2.26 m (7 ft 4 3/4 in) | 8 |
| 3rd place, bronze medalist(s) | JuVaughn Harrison | LSU | 2.26 m (7 ft 4 3/4 in) | 6 |
| 4 | Earnie Sears | USC | 2.23 m (7 ft 3 3/4 in) | 5 |
| 5 | Keenon Laine | Georgia | 2.23 m (7 ft 3 3/4 in) | 4 |
| 6 | Jordan Wesner | Memphis | 2.23 m (7 ft 3 3/4 in) | 3 |
| 7 | Mayson Conner | Nebraska | 2.23 m (7 ft 3 3/4 in) | 2 |
| 8 | Jhonny Victor | Florida | 2.20 m (7 ft 2 1/2 in) | 1 |

==== Pole vault ====
- Final results shown, not prelims

| Rank | Name | University | Best Jump | Team score |
|---|---|---|---|---|
| 1st place, gold medalist(s) | Mondo Duplantis Sweden | LSU | 5.83 m (19 ft 1 1/2 in) | 10 |
| 2nd place, silver medalist(s) | Chris Nilsen | South Dakota | 5.73 m (18 ft 9 1/2 in) | 8 |
| 3rd place, bronze medalist(s) | Jacob Wooten | Texas A&M | 5.73 m (18 ft 9 1/2 in) | 6 |
| 4 | Matthew Ludwig | Akron | 5.68 m (18 ft 7 1/2 in) | 5 |
| 5 | Zach Bradford | Kansas | 5.63 m (18 ft 5 1/2 in) | 4 |
| 6 | Hussain Al-Hizam Saudi Arabia | Kansas | 5.63 m (18 ft 5 1/2 in) | 3 |
| 7 | Clayton Fritsch | Sam Houston State | 5.63 m (18 ft 5 1/2 in) | 2 |
| 8 | KC Lightfoot | Baylor | 5.63 m (18 ft 5 1/2 in) | 1 |

==== Long jump ====
- Final results shown, not prelims

| Rank | Name | University | Best Jump | Team score |
|---|---|---|---|---|
| 1st place, gold medalist(s) | Rayvon Grey | LSU | 7.97 m (26 ft 1 3/4 in) | 10 |
| 2nd place, silver medalist(s) | Trumaine Jefferson | Houston | 7.96 m (26 ft 1 1/4 in) | 8 |
| 3rd place, bronze medalist(s) | Grant Holloway | Florida | 7.95 m (26 ft 3/4 in) | 6 |
| 4 | Jacob Fincham–Dukes United Kingdom | Oklahoma State | 7.94 m (26 ft 1/2 in) | 5 |
| 5 | Charles Brown | Texas Tech | 7.91 m (25 ft 11 1/4 in) | 4 |
| 6 | Fabian Edoki Nigeria | Middle Tennessee | 7.86 m (25 ft 9 1/4 in) | 3 |
| 7 | Jordan Latimer | Akron | 7.82 m (25 ft 7 3/4 in) | 2 |
| 8 | Ja'Mari Ward | Missouri | 7.79 m (25 ft 6 1/2 in) | 1 |

==== Triple jump ====
- Final results shown, not prelims

| Rank | Name | University | Best Jump | Team score |
|---|---|---|---|---|
| 1st place, gold medalist(s) | Jordan Scott | Virginia | 16.89 m (55 ft 4 3/4 in) | 10 |
| 2nd place, silver medalist(s) | Odaine Lewis | Texas Tech | 16.65 m (54 ft 7 1/2 in) | 8 |
| 3rd place, bronze medalist(s) | Chengetayi Mapaya Zimbabwe | TCU | 16.61 m (54 ft 5 3/4 in) | 6 |
| 4 | Armani Wallace | Florida State | 16.51 m (54 ft 2 in) | 5 |
| 5 | Clayton Brown Jamaica | Florida | 16.41 m (53 ft 10 in) | 4 |
| 6 | John Warren | Southern Miss | 16.37 m (53 ft 8 1/4 in) | 3 |
| 7 | Tuomas Kaukolahti Finland | California | 16.35 m (53 ft 7 1/2 in) | 2 |
| 8 | O'Brien Wasome Jamaica | Texas | 16.14 m (52 ft 11 1/4 in) | 1 |

==== Shot put ====
- Final results shown, not prelims

| Rank | Name | University | Best Throw | Team score |
|---|---|---|---|---|
| 1st place, gold medalist(s) | Payton Otterdahl | North Dakota State | 21.71 m (71 ft 2 1/2 in) | 10 |
| 2nd place, silver medalist(s) | Adrian Piperi | Texas | 20.98 m (68 ft 9 3/4 in) | 8 |
| 3rd place, bronze medalist(s) | Denzel Comenentia Netherlands | Georgia | 20.58 m (67 ft 6 in) | 6 |
| 4 | Daniel McArthur | North Carolina | 20.33 m (66 ft 8 1/4 in) | 5 |
| 5 | Jordan Geist | Arizona | 20.28 m (66 ft 6 1/4 in) | 4 |
| 6 | Kord Ferguson | Alabama | 19.82 m (65 ft 1/4 in) | 3 |
| 7 | Matthew Katnik | USC | 19.69 m (64 ft 7 in) | 2 |
| 8 | McKay Johnson | California | 19.67 m (64 ft 6 1/4 in) | 1 |

==== Weight throw ====
- Final results shown, not prelims

| Rank | Name | University | Best Throw | Team score |
|---|---|---|---|---|
| 1st place, gold medalist(s) | Payton Otterdahl | North Dakota State | 24.11 m (79 ft 1 in) | 10 |
| 2nd place, silver medalist(s) | Adam Kelly | Princeton | 23.38 m (76 ft 8 1/4 in) | 8 |
| 3rd place, bronze medalist(s) | Denzel Comenentia Netherlands | Georgia | 23.32 m (76 ft 6 in) | 6 |
| 4 | A.J. McFarland | Florida | 22.51 m (73 ft 10 in) | 5 |
| 5 | Morgan Shigo | Penn State | 22.40 m (73 ft 5 3/4 in) | 4 |
| 6 | Joseph Ellis United Kingdom | Michigan | 22.38 m (73 ft 5 in) | 3 |
| 7 | Thomas Mardal Norway | Florida | 21.93 m (71 ft 11 1/4 in) | 2 |
| 8 | David Lucas | Penn State | 21.74 m (71 ft 3 3/4 in) | 1 |

==== Heptathlon ====
- Final results shown, not prelims

| Rank | Name | University | Overall points | 60 m | LJ | SP | HJ | 60 m H | PV | 1000 m |
|---|---|---|---|---|---|---|---|---|---|---|
| 1st place, gold medalist(s) | Harrison Williams | Stanford | 6042 | 865; 7.05 | 898; 7.35 m (24 ft 1 1/4 in) | 703; 13.59 m (44 ft 7 in) | 831; 2.03 m (6 ft 7 3/4 in) | 949; 8.13 | 960; 5.16 m (16 ft 11 in) | 836; 2:43.38 |
| 2nd place, silver medalist(s) | Gabe Moore | Arkansas | 5975 | 947; 6.82 | 864; 7.21 m (23 ft 7 3/4 in) | 781; 14.86 m (48 ft 9 in) | 831; 2.03 m (6 ft 7 3/4 in) | 977; 8.02 | 778; 4.56 m (14 ft 11 1/2 in) | 797; 2:47.06 |
| 3rd place, bronze medalist(s) | Nick Guerrant | Michigan State | 5944 | 882; 7.00 | 888; 7.31 m (23 ft 11 3/4 in) | 724; 13.93 m (45 ft 8 1/4 in) | 859; 2.06 m (6 ft 9 in) | 908; 8.30 | 868; 4.86 m (15 ft 11 1/4 in) | 815; 2:45.33 |
| 4 | Jared Seay | Nebraska | 5847 | 872; 7.03 | 913; 7.41 m (24 ft 3 1/2 in) | 708; 13.66 m (44 ft 9 3/4 in) | 887; 2.09 m (6 ft 10 1/4 in) | 910; 8.29 | 868; 4.86 m (15 ft 11 1/4 in) | 689; 2:57.51 |
| 5 | Johannes Erm Estonia | Georgia | 5817 | 851; 7.09 | 922; 7.45 m (24 ft 5 1/4 in) | 751; 14.37 m (47 ft 1 1/2 in) | 749; 1.94 m (6 ft 4 1/4 in) | 954; 8.11 | 748; 4.46 m (14 ft 7 1/2 in) | 842; 2:42.89 |
| 6 | Ayden Owens Puerto Rico | USC | 5809 | 973; 6.75 | 799; 6.94 m (22 ft 9 in) | 715; 13.79 m (45 ft 2 3/4 in) | 723; 1.91 m (6 ft 3 in) | 1022; 7.84 | 778; 4.56 m (14 ft 11 1/2 in) | 799; 2:46.81 |
| 7 | Trent Nytes | Wisconsin | 5746 | 833; 7.14 | 845; 7.13 m (23 ft 4 1/2 in) | 703; 13.59 m (44 ft 7 in) | 973; 2.18 m (7 ft 1 3/4 in) | 862; 8.49 | 691; 4.26 m (13 ft 11 1/2 in) | 839; 2:43.13 |
| 8 | Aaron Booth New Zealand | Kansas State | 5719 | 858; 7.07 | 883; 7.29 m (23 ft 11 in) | 726; 13.96 m (45 ft 9 1/2 in) | 831; 2.03 m (6 ft 7 3/4 in) | 829; 8.63 | 778; 4.56 m (14 ft 11 1/2 in) | 814; 2:45.41 |

=== Men's team scores ===
- Top 10 and ties shown

| Rank | University | Team score |
|---|---|---|
| 1st place, gold medalist(s) | Florida | 55 points |
| 2nd place, silver medalist(s) | Houston | 44 points |
| 3rd place, bronze medalist(s) | LSU | 31 points |
| 4 | Stanford | 30 points |
| 4 | Wisconsin | 30 points |
| 6 | Florida State | 24 points |
| 6 | Texas Tech | 24 points |
| 8 | Alabama | 23 points |
| 9 | Georgia | 20 points |
| 9 | North Dakota State | 20 points |

=== Women's results ===
==== 60 meters ====
- Final results shown, not prelims

| Rank | Name | University | Time | Team score |
|---|---|---|---|---|
| 1st place, gold medalist(s) | Twanisha Terry | USC | 7.14 | 10 |
| 2nd place, silver medalist(s) | Teahna Daniels | Texas | 7.19 | 8 |
| 3rd place, bronze medalist(s) | Ka'Tia Seymour | Florida State | 7.19 | 6 |
| 4 | Destiny Smith–Barnett | UNLV | 7.19 | 5 |
| 5 | Kortnei Johnson | LSU | 7.21 | 4 |
| 6 | Kianna Gray | Kentucky | 7.25 | 3 |
| 7 | Sha'Carri Richardson | LSU | 7.27 | 2 |
| 8 | Kiara Parker | Arkansas | 7.32 | 1 |

==== 200 meters ====
- Final results shown, not prelims

| Rank | Name | University | Time | Team score |
|---|---|---|---|---|
| 1st place, gold medalist(s) | Kayla White | North Carolina A&T | 22.66 | 10 |
| 2nd place, silver medalist(s) | Tamara Clark | Alabama | 22.99 | 8 |
| 3rd place, bronze medalist(s) | Payton Chadwick | Arkansas | 22.99 | 6 |
| 4 | Lanae–Tava Thomas | USC | 23.06 | 5 |
| 5 | Anavia Battle | Ohio State | 23.07 | 4 |
| 6 | Kortnei Johnson | LSU | 23.20 | 3 |
| 7 | Lauren Rain Williams | USC | 23.22 | 2 |
| | Kynnedy Flannel | Texas | DQ | —N/a |

==== 400 meters ====
- Final results shown, not prelims

| Rank | Name | University | Time | Team score |
|---|---|---|---|---|
| 1st place, gold medalist(s) | Kaelin Roberts | USC | 51.50 | 10 |
| 2nd place, silver medalist(s) | Aliyah Abrams Guyana | South Carolina | 52.27 | 8 |
| 3rd place, bronze medalist(s) | Kyra Constantine Canada | USC | 52.32 | 6 |
| 4 | Alexis Holmes | Penn State | 52.37 | 5 |
| 5 | Lynna Irby | Georgia | 52.38 | 4 |
| 6 | Briana Guillory | Iowa | 52.86 | 3 |
| 7 | Gabby Scott Puerto Rico | Colorado | 53.19 | 2 |
| 8 | Sharrika Barnett | Florida | 53.32 | 1 |

==== 800 meters ====
- Final results shown, not prelims

| Rank | Name | University | Time | Team score |
|---|---|---|---|---|
| 1st place, gold medalist(s) | Danae Rivers | Penn State | 2:03.69 | 10 |
| 2nd place, silver medalist(s) | Nia Akins | Penn | 2:03.74 | 8 |
| 3rd place, bronze medalist(s) | Rachel Pocratsky | Virginia Tech | 2:04.04 | 6 |
| 4 | Allie Wilson | Monmouth | 2:04.12 | 5 |
| 5 | Martha Bissah Ghana | Norfolk State | 2:04.48 | 4 |
| 6 | Susan Aneno Uganda | UConn | 2:05.86 | 3 |
| 7 | Kelsey Harris | Indiana | 2:06.99 | 2 |
| 8 | Jazmine Fray Jamaica | Texas A&M | 2:07.55 | 1 |

==== Mile ====
- Final results shown, not prelims

| Rank | Name | University | Time | Team score |
|---|---|---|---|---|
| 1st place, gold medalist(s) | Julia Rizk | Ohio State | 4:37.63 | 10 |
| 2nd place, silver medalist(s) | Karisa Nelson | Samford | 4:38.24 | 8 |
| 3rd place, bronze medalist(s) | Millie Paladino | Providence | 4:38.44 | 6 |
| 4 | Taryn Rawlings | Portland | 4:38.47 | 5 |
| 5 | Carina Viljoen | Arkansas | 4:38.51 | 4 |
| 6 | Sarah Edwards | Virginia Tech | 4:38.68 | 3 |
| 7 | Katie Rainsberger | Washington | 4:39.05 | 2 |
| 8 | Sarah Feeny | Utah | 4:39.35 | 1 |

==== 3000 meters ====
- Final results shown, not prelims

| Rank | Name | University | Time | Team score |
|---|---|---|---|---|
| 1st place, gold medalist(s) | Jessica Hull Australia | Oregon | 9:01.14 | 10 |
| 2nd place, silver medalist(s) | Taylor Werner | Arkansas | 9:01.75 | 8 |
| 3rd place, bronze medalist(s) | Weini Kelati Eritrea | New Mexico | 9:02.44 | 6 |
| 4 | Allie Ostrander | Boise State | 9:04.76 | 5 |
| 5 | Erica Birk | BYU | 9:05.62 | 4 |
| 6 | Makena Morley | Colorado | 9:06.74 | 3 |
| 7 | Lauren Gregory | Arkansas | 9:08.00 | 2 |
| 8 | Hannah Steelman | Wofford | 9:08.79 | 1 |

==== 5000 meters ====
- Final results shown, not prelims

| Rank | Name | University | Time | Team score |
|---|---|---|---|---|
| 1st place, gold medalist(s) | Alicia Monson | Wisconsin | 15:31.26 | 10 |
| 2nd place, silver medalist(s) | Weini Kelati Eritrea | New Mexico | 15:32.95 | 8 |
| 3rd place, bronze medalist(s) | Fiona O'Keeffe | Stanford | 15:37.61 | 6 |
| 4 | Ednah Kurgat Kenya | New Mexico | 15:39.04 | 5 |
| 5 | Charlotte Prouse Canada | New Mexico | 15:39.04 | 4 |
| 6 | Jaci Smith | Air Force | 15:40.26 | 3 |
| 7 | Makena Morley | Colorado | 15:41.67 | 2 |
| 8 | Allie Ostrander | Boise State | 15:46.69 | 1 |

==== 60 meter hurdles ====
- Final results shown, not prelims

| Rank | Name | University | Time | Team score |
|---|---|---|---|---|
| 1st place, gold medalist(s) | Chanel Brissett | USC | 7.90 | 10 |
| 2nd place, silver medalist(s) | Kayla White | North Carolina A&T | 7.92 | 8 |
| 3rd place, bronze medalist(s) | Payton Chadwick | Arkansas | 7.97 | 6 |
| 4 | Naomi Taylor | Houston | 8.01 | 5 |
| 5 | Janeek Brown Jamaica | Arkansas | 8.04 | 4 |
| 6 | Dior Hall | USC | 8.11 | 3 |
| 7 | Mecca McGlaston | USC | 8.48 | 2 |
| | Anna Cockrell | USC | DNS | 1 |

==== 4 × 400 meters relay ====
- Final results shown, not prelims

| Rank | University | Time | Team score |
|---|---|---|---|
| 1st place, gold medalist(s) | South Carolina | 3:30.76 | 10 |
| 2nd place, silver medalist(s) | Texas A&M | 3:30.85 | 8 |
| 3rd place, bronze medalist(s) | Arkansas | 3:30.86 | 6 |
| 4 | Georgia | 3:31.09 | 5 |
| 5 | Florida | 3:32.02 | 4 |
| 6 | USC | 3:32.47 | 3 |
| 7 | Miami (FL) | 3:32.62 | 2 |
| 8 | Kentucky | 3:32.89 | 1 |

==== Distance medley relay ====
- Final results shown, not prelims

| Rank | University | Time | Team score |
|---|---|---|---|
| 1st place, gold medalist(s) | Oregon | 10:53.43 | 10 |
| 2nd place, silver medalist(s) | BYU | 10:54.14 | 8 |
| 3rd place, bronze medalist(s) | Oklahoma State | 10:55.01 | 6 |
| 4 | Villanova | 10:56.04 | 5 |
| 5 | Arkansas | 10:56.85 | 4 |
| 6 | Michigan | 10:56.85 | 3 |
| 7 | Washington | 11:10.94 | 2 |
| 8 | Indiana | 11:13.66 | 1 |

==== High jump ====
- Final results shown, not prelims

| Rank | Name | University | Best Jump | Team score |
|---|---|---|---|---|
| 1st place, gold medalist(s) | Zarriea Willis | Texas Tech | 1.87 m (6 ft 1 1/2 in) | 10 |
| 2nd place, silver medalist(s) | Quamecha Morrison | Bethune–Cookman | 1.84 m (6 ft 1/4 in) | 8 |
| 3rd place, bronze medalist(s) | Loretta Blaut | Cincinnati | 1.84 m (6 ft 1/4 in) | 6 |
| 4 | Sanaa Barnes | Villanova | 1.84 m (6 ft 1/4 in) | 5 |
| 5 | Stephanie Abrams | Omaha | 1.81 m (5 ft 11 1/4 in) | 4 |
| 6 | Abigail O'Donoghue | LSU | 1.81 m (5 ft 11 1/4 in) | 3 |
| 7 | Lillian Lowe | Arizona | 1.81 m (5 ft 11 1/4 in) | 2 |
| 8 | Andrea Stapleton–Johnson | BYU | 1.81 m (5 ft 11 1/4 in) | 1 |

==== Pole vault ====
- Final results shown, not prelims

| Rank | Name | University | Best Jump | Team score |
|---|---|---|---|---|
| 1st place, gold medalist(s) | Alexis Jacobus | Arkansas | 4.61 m (15 ft 1 1/4 in) | 10 |
| 2nd place, silver medalist(s) | Bonnie Draxler | San Diego State | 4.56 m (14 ft 11 1/2 in) | 8 |
| 3rd place, bronze medalist(s) | Victoria Hoggard | Arkansas | 4.46 m (14 ft 7 1/2 in) | 6 |
| 4 | Desiree Freier | Arkansas | 4.46 m (14 ft 7 1/2 in) | 5 |
| 5 | Bridget Guy | Virginia | 4.41 m (14 ft 5 1/2 in) | 4 |
| 6 | Rachel Baxter | Virginia Tech | 4.41 m (14 ft 5 1/2 in) | 3 |
| 7 | Nastassja Campbell | Stephen F. Austin | 4.26 m (13 ft 11 1/2 in) | 2 |
| 8 | Chinne Okoronkwo | Texas Tech | 4.26 m (13 ft 11 1/2 in) | 1 |

==== Long jump ====
- Final results shown, not prelims

| Rank | Name | University | Best Jump | Team score |
|---|---|---|---|---|
| 1st place, gold medalist(s) | Jasmyn Steels | Northwestern State | 6.46 m (21 ft 2 1/4 in) | 10 |
| 2nd place, silver medalist(s) | Deborah Acquah Ghana | Texas A&M | 6.46 m (21 ft 2 1/4 in) | 8 |
| 3rd place, bronze medalist(s) | Yanis David | Florida | 6.43 m (21 ft 1 in) | 6 |
| 4 | Destiny Longmire | TCU | 6.34 m (20 ft 9 1/2 in) | 5 |
| 5 | Rhesa Foster | Oregon | 6.31 m (20 ft 8 1/4 in) | 4 |
| 6 | Nadia Williams | Central Michigan | 6.30 m (20 ft 8 in) | 3 |
| 7 | Sarea Alexander | Incarnate Word | 6.29 m (20 ft 7 1/2 in) | 2 |
| 8 | Samiyah Samuels | Houston | 6.26 m (20 ft 6 1/4 in) | 1 |

==== Triple jump ====
- Final results shown, not prelims

| Rank | Name | University | Best Jump | Team score |
|---|---|---|---|---|
| 1st place, gold medalist(s) | Yanis David | Florida | 14.03 m (46 ft 1/4 in) | 10 |
| 2nd place, silver medalist(s) | Chaquinn Cook | Oregon | 13.83 m (45 ft 4 1/4 in) | 8 |
| 3rd place, bronze medalist(s) | Marie–Josee Ebwea–Bile Excel France | Kentucky | 13.58 m (44 ft 6 1/2 in) | 6 |
| 4 | LaChyna Roe | Tennessee | 13.54 m (44 ft 5 in) | 5 |
| 5 | Bria Matthews | Georgia Tech | 13.50 m (44 ft 3 1/4 in) | 4 |
| 6 | Shardia Lawrence Jamaica | Kansas State | 13.31 m (43 ft 8 in) | 3 |
| 7 | Alonie Sutton | Tennessee | 13.25 m (43 ft 5 1/2 in) | 2 |
| 8 | Chinne Okoronkwo | Texas Tech | 13.10 m (42 ft 11 1/2 in) | 1 |

==== Shot put ====
- Final results shown, not prelims

| Rank | Name | University | Best Throw | Team score |
|---|---|---|---|---|
| 1st place, gold medalist(s) | Samantha Noennig | Arizona State | 17.91 m (58 ft 9 in) | 10 |
| 2nd place, silver medalist(s) | Lena Giger | Stanford | 17.89 m (58 ft 8 1/4 in) | 8 |
| 3rd place, bronze medalist(s) | Portious Warren Trinidad and Tobago | Alabama | 17.41 m (57 ft 1 1/4 in) | 6 |
| 4 | Alyssa Wilson | UCLA | 17.38 m (57 ft 1/4 in) | 5 |
| 5 | Sade Olatoye Nigeria | Ohio State | 17.23 m (56 ft 6 1/4 in) | 4 |
| 6 | Khayla Dawson | Indiana | 17.19 m (56 ft 4 3/4 in) | 3 |
| 7 | Aliyah Gustafson | Bowling Green | 17.17 m (56 ft 3 3/4 in) | 2 |
| 8 | Bailey Rentzlaff | North Dakota State | 16.77 m (55 ft 0 in) | 1 |

==== Weight throw ====
- Final results shown, not prelims

| Rank | Name | University | Best Throw | Team score |
|---|---|---|---|---|
| 1st place, gold medalist(s) | Sade Olatoye | Ohio State | 24.46 m (80 ft 2 3/4 in) | 10 |
| 2nd place, silver medalist(s) | Makenli Forrest | Louisville | 22.54 m (73 ft 11 1/4 in) | 8 |
| 3rd place, bronze medalist(s) | Taylor Scaife | Houston | 22.50 m (73 ft 9 3/4 in) | 6 |
| 4 | Erin Reese | Indiana State | 22.34 m (73 ft 3 1/2 in) | 5 |
| 5 | Laulauga Tausaga | Iowa | 22.23 m (72 ft 11 in) | 4 |
| 6 | Stamatia Scarvelis Greece | Tennessee | 22.21 m (72 ft 10 1/4 in) | 3 |
| 7 | Jordan McClendon | Missouri | 21.95 m (72 ft 0 in) | 2 |
| 8 | Madi Malone | Auburn | 21.49 m (70 ft 6 in) | 1 |

==== Pentathlon ====
- Final results shown, not prelims

| Rank | Name | University | Overall points | 60 m H | HJ | SP | LJ | 800 m |
|---|---|---|---|---|---|---|---|---|
| 1st place, gold medalist(s) | Michelle Atherley | Miami (FL) | 4547 | 1093; 8.16 | 953; 1.78 m (5 ft 10 in) | 728; 13.01 m (42 ft 8 in) | 871; 6.07 m (19 ft 10 3/4 in) | 902; 2:14.34 |
| 2nd place, silver medalist(s) | Jordan Gray | Kennesaw State | 4412 | 974; 974 | 879; 1.72 m (5 ft 7 1/2 in) | 817; 14.35 m (47 ft 3/4 in) | 912; 6.20 m (20 ft 4 in) | 830; 2:19.55 |
| 3rd place, bronze medalist(s) | Ashtin Zamzow | Texas | 4294 | 1044; 8.38 | 953; 1.78 m (5 ft 10 in) | 723; 12.93 m (42 ft 5 in) | 753; 5.68 m (18 ft 7 1/2 in) | 821; 2:20.17 |
| 4 | Erinn Beattie | UC Davis | 4293 | 978; 8.68 | 1029; 1.84 m (6 ft 1/4 in) | 589; 10.90 m (35 ft 9 in) | 816; 5.89 m (19 ft 3 3/4 in) | 881; 2:15.86 |
| 5 | Stacey Destin | Alabama | 4287 | 1013; 8.52 | 1029; 1.84 m (6 ft 1/4 in) | 654; 11.89 m (39 ft 0 in) | 856; 6.02 m (19 ft 9 in) | 735; 2:26.65 |
| 6 | Hope Bender | UC Santa Barbara | 4262 | 1004; 8.56 | 879; 1.72 m (5 ft 7 1/2 in) | 705; 12.66 m (41 ft 6 1/4 in) | 762; 5.71 m (18 ft 8 3/4 in) | 912; 2:13.62 |
| 7 | Aliyah Whisby | Georgia | 4237 | 1026; 8.46 | 916; 1.75 m (5 ft 8 3/4 in) | 607; 11.18 m (36 ft 8 in) | 934; 6.27 m (20 ft 6 3/4 in) | 754; 2:25.22 |
| 8 | Grace McKenzie Ireland | McNeese State | 4230 | 1002; 8.57 | 916; 1.75 m (5 ft 8 3/4 in) | 600; 11.08 m (36 ft 4 in) | 804; 5.85 m (19 ft 2 1/4 in) | 908; 2:13.95 |

=== Women's team scores ===
- Top 10 and ties shown

| Rank | University | Team score |
|---|---|---|
| 1st place, gold medalist(s) | Arkansas | 62 points |
| 2nd place, silver medalist(s) | USC | 51 points |
| 3rd place, bronze medalist(s) | Oregon | 32 points |
| 4 | Ohio State | 28 points |
| 5 | New Mexico | 23 points |
| 6 | Florida | 21 points |
| 7 | North Carolina A&T | 18 points |
| 7 | South Carolina | 18 points |
| 7 | Alabama | 18 points |
| 10 | Texas A&M | 17 points |

== See also ==
- NCAA Men's Division I Indoor Track and Field Championships
- NCAA Women's Division I Indoor Track and Field Championships
- U.S. Track & Field and Cross Country Coaches Association announced NCAA Indoor championship field USTFCCCA
