= 1983 NCAA Indoor Track and Field Championships =

- Dates: March 11–12, 1983
- Host city: Pontiac, Michigan
- Venue: Pontiac Silverdome

The 1983 NCAA Indoor Track and Field Championships were contested March 11−12, 1983 at the Pontiac Silverdome in Pontiac, Michigan to determine the individual and team national champions of men's and, for the first time, women's NCAA collegiate indoor track and field events in the United States. These were the 19th annual men's championships and the 1st annual women's championships.

On the men's side, the team title was claimed by SMU; it was the Mustang's first and the last team title not won by Arkansas until 1996. For the women, Nebraska took home the inaugural team title.

== Qualification ==
Unlike other NCAA-sponsored sports, there were not separate NCAA Division I, Division II, and Division III championships for indoor track and field until 1985. As such, all athletes and programs from all three divisions were eligible to compete.

== Team standings ==
- Note: Top 10 only
- Scoring: 6 points for a 1st-place finish, 4 points for 2nd, 3 points for 3rd, 2 points for 4th, and 1 point for 5th
- ^{(DC)} = Defending Champions
- Full results

=== Men's title ===
Rank	Team	Points
1st place, gold medalist(s)	SMU	43
2nd place, silver medalist(s)	Villanova	32
3rd place, bronze medalist(s)	Arkansas	29
4	Indiana	27
5	Tennessee	26
6	Houston	22
7	Washington State	21
8	Jackson State; USC	18
10	UTEP ^{(DC)}	16

=== Women's title ===
Rank	Team	Points
1st place, gold medalist(s)	Nebraska	47
2nd place, silver medalist(s)	Tennessee	44
3rd place, bronze medalist(s)	Stanford	28
4	Houston	24
5	UTEP; Virginia	17 1/4
7	BYU; Michigan State	14
9	Wisconsin	12
10	Alabama; Arizona; Clemson; Fairleigh Dickinson; Georgia; Ohio State	10
