= List of Arizona State Sun Devils track and field athletes =

Arizona State University (ASU) has graduated a number of athletes. This includes graduates, non-graduate former students and current students of ASU who are notable for their achievements within athletics, sometimes before or after their time at ASU. Athletes in other sports can be found in the list of Arizona State University athletes; other alumni, including non-playing coaches and athletic administrators, can be found in the list of Arizona State University alumni.

ASU has produced 50 Olympians in track and field, winning a total of 16 medals.

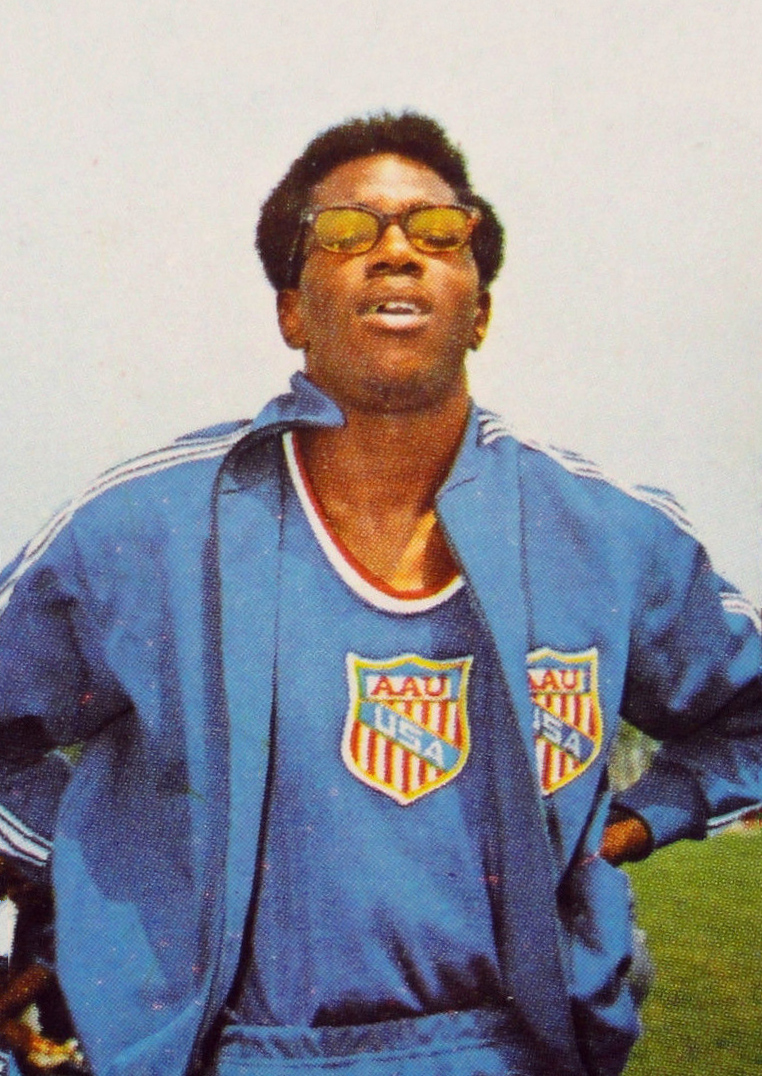
Ron Freeman

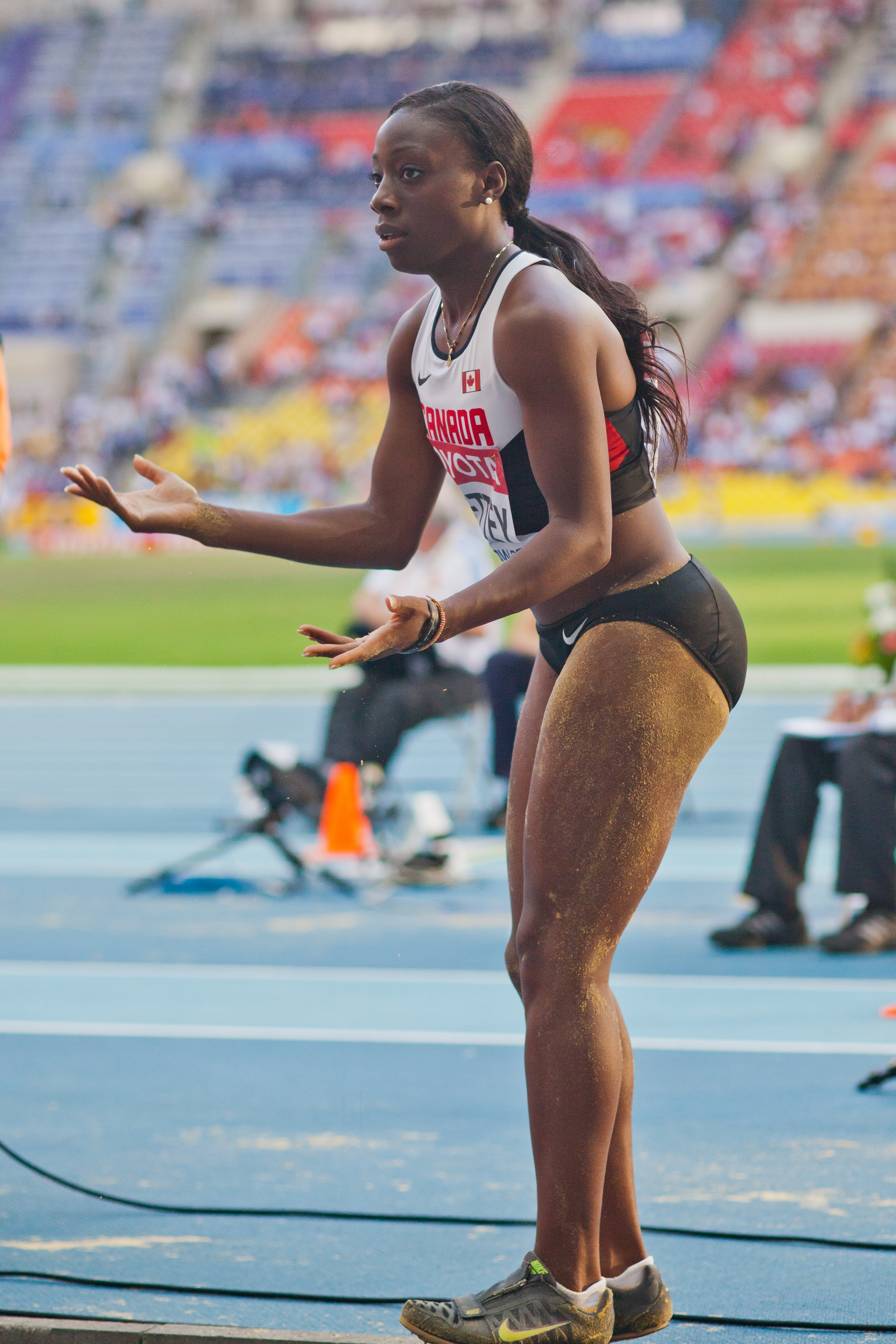
Christabel Nettey

Track and field
Name	Years played at ASU	Notes	Ref.
Lisa Aguilera	1998–2001	Distance runner	
Omolade Akinremi		Represented Nigeria at the 1996 Summer Olympics	
Omotayo Akinremi		Represented Nigeria at the 1996 Summer Olympics	
Ime Akpan		Represented Nigeria at the 1992 and 1996 Summer Olympics	
CJ Albertson	2014–2017	Distance runner	
Kyle Alcorn		Represented the U.S. at the 2012 Summer Olympics	
Seth Amoo		Represented Ghana at the 2008 Summer Olympics	
Lewis Banda		Represented Zimbabwe at the 2004 and Summer Olympics	
Jéssica Barreira	2016–2019	Jumper	
Jacinta Bartholomew	1986–1989	Represented Grenada in the long jump at the 1984 Summer Olympics	
Chris Benard		Represented the U.S. at the 2016 Summer Olympics	
Rhonda Brady	1978		
Jerry Bright	1967–1969	Sprinter	
Ron Brown	1979–1982	Played track and football at ASU; won a gold medal for the U.S. in the 4 × 400 meter track relay at the 1984 Summer Olympics	
Marcus Brunson	1997–2001		
Michael Campbell		Represented Jamaica at the 2004 Summer Olympics	
Henry Carr	1962–1964	Won two gold medals at the 1964 Summer Olympics	
Jasmine Chaney	2007–2011	Hurdler	
Jordan Clarke	2010–2013	Shot putter	
Frank Covelli	1962–1963	Javelin thrower; represented the U.S. at the 1964 and 1968 Summer Olympics	
Fearghal Curtin	2018–2021	Long-distance runner	
Tony Darden			
Desiree Davila		Represented the U.S. in the marathon at the 2012 Summer Olympics	
Leslie Deniz	1981–1985	Discus; won the silver medal at the 1984 Summer Olympics	
Dwayne Evans	1980–1981	won a bronze medal in track for the 200-meter dash event at the 1976 Summer Olympics	
Maggie Ewen	2015–2018	Shot put, hammer	
Pål Arne Fagernes		Represented Norway at the 1996 and 2000 Summer Olympics	
Gamali Felix	2021–2024	Sprinter and relay runner	
Herman Frazier	1975-1977	Won a gold medal in the 4 × 400 meter relay and a bronze medal in the 400 meters for the U.S. at the 1976 Summer Olympics	
Ron Freeman	1966–1969	Won a gold medal in the 4 × 400 meter relay and a bronze medal in the 400 meters for the U.S. at the 1976 Summer Olympics	
Benny Garcia	1953–1956	Javelin thrower; represented the U.S. at the 1956 Summer Olympics	
Amy Hastings		Cross country; won the 2006 NCAA championship in the 5,000 meters; represented the U.S. at the 2012 and 2016 Summer Olympics	
Ricardo Héber		Javelin thrower; represented Argentina at the 1948 and 1952 Summer Olympics	
Shelby Houlihan		Represented the U.S. at the 2016 Summer Olympics	
Nick Hysong	1991–1994	won a gold medal in the pole vault event at the 2000 Summer Olympics	
Ivan Jean-Marie		Represented St. Lucia at the 1996 Summer Olympics	
Anna Jelmini	2009–2013		
Gea Johnson	1987–1990	Heptathlete; represented the U.S. in bobsleigh at the 2002 Winter Olympics	
Jacquelyn Johnson		Represented the U.S. at the 2008 Summer Olympics	
Natalie Kaaiawahia	1984	All-American shot putter	
Allie Kieffer	2009–2010	Distance runner	
Mavis Laing	1971–1972	Sprinter	
Mya Lesnar	2020–2022	Shot putter	
Maicel Malone-Wallace	1989–1992	Won a gold medal for the U.S. in the 4 × 400 meter relay at the 1996 Summer Olympics	
Tracy Mattes	1990–1991	Hurdler; after track, became a humanitarian	
Vincent Mauri	2019–2022	Distance runner	
Bryan McBride	2011–2015	High jumper	
Bill Miller	1948–1951	ASU's and Arizona's first Olympic athlete; (Note: Though Ricardo Héber competed in 1948, he did not arrive at ASU until 1952.) won a silver medal in the javelin at the 1952 Summer Olympics	
Ralford Mullings	2022	Discus thrower	
Mark Murro	1968–1971	Javelin; represented the U.S. at the 1968 Summer Olympics	
Beatrice Nedberge Llano		Represented Norway at the 2024 Summer Olympics	
Lynn Nelson		Represented the U.S. at the 1988 Summer Olympics	
Christabel Nettey		Represented Canada at the 2016 Summer Olympics	
Dubem Nwachukwu	2020–2023	Sprinter; represented Nigeria at the 2024 Summer Olympics	
Andrew Parker		Represented Jamaica at the 1988 Summer Olympics	
Maurice Peoples	1972–1973	Represented the U.S. at the 1972 Summer Olympics	
Joel Phillip		Represented Grenada at the 2008 Summer Olympics	
Dwight Phillips	1999–2000	Long jumper; won a gold medal for the U.S. at the 2004 Summer Olympics, also competed in 2000	
Trevell Quinley		Represented the U.S. at the 2008 Summer Olympics	
Coleen Rienstra	1978–1981	High jumper	
Justin Robinson	2021–2024	Sprinter	
Donald Sanford		Represented Israel at the 2012 and 2016 Summer Olympics	
Lou Scott		Represented the U.S. at the 1968 Summer Olympics	
Allysa Seely		Triathlete; leg later amputated, three-time Paralympic medalist	
Mark Senior		Represented Jamaica at the 1984 Summer Olympics	
Malcolm "Mal" Spence		Represented Jamaica and the West Indies Federation at the 1956, 1960 and 1964 Summer Olympics	
Mel Spence		Represented Jamaica at the 1956 and 1964 Summer Olympics	
Mike Stahr	1983–1984		
Ria Stalman	1979–1981	Discus; won a gold medal for the Netherlands at the 1984 Summer Olympics	
Jim Stangeland	1947-1948	Coached football at California State University, Long Beach, and Long Beach City College	
Lynda Tolbert-Goode	1986–1990	Represented the U.S. at the 1992 and 1996 Summper Olympics	
María Trujillo		Represented Mexico at the 1984 Summer Olympics	
Jorinde van Klinken	2021	Dutch shot putter and discus thrower	
Turner Washington	2018–2023	Discus and shot put thrower; won five total national titles	
Ryan Whiting	2006–2010	Shot put; represented the U.S. at the 2012 Summer Olympics	
Charonda Williams	2008–2009	Sprinter	
Ulis Williams	1962–1965	Won a gold medal for the U.S. in the 4 × 400 meter relay at the 1964 Summer Olympics	
