= Arizona State Sun Devils track and field =

College track and field team

- University: Arizona State University
- Head coach: Dion Miller
- Conference: Big 12
- Location: Tempe, Arizona
- Outdoor track: Sun Angel Stadium
- Nickname: Sun Devils
- Colors: Maroon and gold

NCAA Indoor National Championships
- Men: 2008; Women: 2007, 2008

NCAA Outdoor National Championships
- Men: 1977; Women: 2007

The Arizona State Sun Devils track and field team is the track and field program that represents Arizona State University. The Sun Devils compete in NCAA Division I as a member of the Big 12 Conference. The team is based in Tempe, Arizona, at the Sun Angel Stadium.

The program is coached by Dion Miller. The track and field program officially encompasses four teams because the NCAA considers men's and women's indoor track and field and outdoor track and field as separate sports.

Jackie Johnson won eight NCAA individual combined track and field events titles for the team from 2004 to 2008, the most national titles of any Sun Devil. The men's team won the program's first team title at the 1977 NCAA Division I Outdoor Track and Field Championships.

== Postseason ==
=== AIAW ===
The Sun Devils have had 16 AIAW individual All-Americans finishing in the top six at the AIAW indoor or outdoor championships.

AIAW All-Americans
| Championships | Name | Event | Place |
|---|---|---|---|
| 1975 Outdoor | Kathy Gibbons | Mile run | 5th |
| 1977 Outdoor | Renaye Bowen | 200 meters | 3rd |
| 1977 Outdoor | Avis Mailey | 400 meters | 5th |
| 1977 Outdoor | Renaye Bowen | 200 meters | 3rd |
| 1977 Outdoor | Celeste Wilkinson | Javelin throw | 4th |
| 1977 Outdoor | Dana Collins | Pentathlon | 1st |
| 1978 Outdoor | Brenda Calhoun | 100 meters | 6th |
| 1978 Outdoor | Brenda Calhoun | 100 meters hurdles | 4th |
| 1978 Outdoor | Rhonda Brady | 100 meters hurdles | 5th |
| 1978 Outdoor | Denise Waddy | 400 meters hurdles | 2nd |
| 1978 Outdoor | Kathey Crawford | 4 × 110 yards relay | 1st |
| 1978 Outdoor | Brenda Calhoun | 4 × 110 yards relay | 1st |
| 1978 Outdoor | Denise Waddy | 4 × 110 yards relay | 1st |
| 1978 Outdoor | Val Boyer | 4 × 110 yards relay | 1st |
| 1978 Outdoor | Kathey Crawford | Sprint medley relay | 1st |
| 1978 Outdoor | Rhonda Brady | Sprint medley relay | 1st |
| 1978 Outdoor | Debra Carson | Sprint medley relay | 1st |
| 1978 Outdoor | Denise Waddy | Sprint medley relay | 1st |
| 1978 Outdoor | Celeste Wilkinson | Javelin throw | 2nd |
| 1978 Outdoor | Dana Collins | Pentathlon | 3rd |
| 1979 Outdoor | Brenda Calhoun | 100 meters | 2nd |
| 1979 Outdoor | Freida Cobbs | 200 meters | 2nd |
| 1979 Outdoor | Kathy Mintie | 5000 meters | 2nd |
| 1979 Outdoor | Brenda Calhoun | 100 meters hurdles | 4th |
| 1979 Outdoor | Kathey Crawford | 4 × 110 yards relay | 1st |
| 1979 Outdoor | Frieda Cobbs | 4 × 110 yards relay | 1st |
| 1979 Outdoor | Brenda Calhoun | 4 × 110 yards relay | 1st |
| 1979 Outdoor | Val Boyer | 4 × 110 yards relay | 1st |
| 1979 Outdoor | Kathey Crawford | Sprint medley relay | 1st |
| 1979 Outdoor | Brenda Calhoun | Sprint medley relay | 1st |
| 1979 Outdoor | Frieda Cobbs | Sprint medley relay | 1st |
| 1979 Outdoor | Sharon Acker | Sprint medley relay | 1st |
| 1979 Outdoor | Ria Van Pedro | Discus throw | 1st |
| 1979 Outdoor | Julie Cart | Discus throw | 5th |
| 1979 Outdoor | Celeste Wilkinson | Javelin throw | 4th |
| 1980 Outdoor | Val Boyer | 100 meters | 6th |
| 1980 Outdoor | Val Boyer | 200 meters | 4th |
| 1980 Outdoor | Charlotte Reeves | 4 × 110 yards relay | 3rd |
| 1980 Outdoor | Kathey Crawford | 4 × 110 yards relay | 3rd |
| 1980 Outdoor | Brenda Calhoun | 4 × 110 yards relay | 3rd |
| 1980 Outdoor | Val Boyer | 4 × 110 yards relay | 3rd |
| 1980 Outdoor | Coleen Reinstra | High jump | 1st |
| 1981 Indoor | Coleen Reinstra | High jump | 1st |
| 1981 Indoor | Ria Stalman | Shot put | 6th |
| 1981 Outdoor | Brenda Calhoun | 100 meters hurdles | 5th |
| 1981 Outdoor | Brenda Calhoun | 100 meters hurdles | 5th |
| 1981 Outdoor | Coleen Reinstra | High jump | 1st |
| 1981 Outdoor | Ria Stalman | Discus throw | 1st |
| 1981 Outdoor | Leslie Deniz | Discus throw | 3rd |

=== NCAA ===
As of August 2025, a total of 110 men and 55 women have achieved individual first-team All-American status at the Division I men's outdoor, women's outdoor, men's indoor, or women's indoor national championships (using the modern criteria of top-8 placing regardless of athlete nationality).

First team NCAA All-Americans
| Team | Championships | Name | Event | Place | Ref. |
|---|---|---|---|---|---|
| Men's | 1942 Outdoor | Gerald Jones | Discus throw | 7th | |
| Men's | 1942 Outdoor | Gerald Jones | Javelin throw | 3rd | |
| Men's | 1942 Outdoor | Donn Kinzle | 220 yards hurdles | 2nd | |
| Men's | 1949 Outdoor | Bill Miller | Javelin throw | 5th | |
| Men's | 1950 Outdoor | Bill Miller | Javelin throw | 3rd | |
| Men's | 1952 Outdoor | Bob Broughton | 3000 meters steeplechase | 6th | |
| Men's | 1953 Outdoor | Dave Kenly | Pole vault | 2nd | |
| Men's | 1955 Outdoor | Benny Garcia | Javelin throw | 6th | |
| Men's | 1957 Outdoor | Joe Rose | Pole vault | 4th | |
| Men's | 1957 Outdoor | Bob Charles | Pole vault | 7th | |
| Men's | 1958 Outdoor | Alex Henderson | 3000 meters | 1st | |
| Men's | 1958 Outdoor | Tom Whetstine | High jump | 4th | |
| Men's | 1959 Outdoor | Mal Spence | 400 meters | 4th | |
| Men's | 1959 Outdoor | Mel Spence | 800 meters | 5th | |
| Men's | 1959 Outdoor | Don Jeisy | Pole vault | 6th | |
| Men's | 1959 Outdoor | Joe Rose | Pole vault | 6th | |
| Men's | 1962 Outdoor | John Rose | Pole vault | 5th | |
| Men's | 1962 Outdoor | Frank Covelli | Javelin throw | 4th | |
| Men's | 1963 Outdoor | Harry Carr | 100 meters | 2nd | |
| Men's | 1963 Outdoor | Henry Carr | 200 meters | 1st | |
| Men's | 1963 Outdoor | Ulis Williams | 400 meters | 1st | |
| Men's | 1963 Outdoor | Ron Freeman | 400 meters | 6th | |
| Men's | 1963 Outdoor | Frank Covelii | Javelin throw | 1st | |
| Men's | 1964 Outdoor | Ulis Williams | 400 meters | 1st | |
| Men's | 1965 Outdoor | Tom Hester | 200 meters | 5th | |
| Men's | 1965 Outdoor | Jon Cole | Discus throw | 2nd | |
| Men's | 1967 Outdoor | Jerry Bright | 100 meters | 5th | |
| Men's | 1967 Outdoor | Jerry Bright | 200 meters | 3rd | |
| Men's | 1968 Outdoor | Jerry Bright | 100 meters | 6th | |
| Men's | 1968 Outdoor | Fair Hooker | 110 meters hurdles | 7th | |
| Men's | 1968 Outdoor | Ron Freeman II | 400 meters | 3rd | |
| Men's | 1968 Outdoor | Chuck Labenz | 1500 meters | 7th | |
| Men's | 1968 Outdoor | Jerry Jobski | 5000 meters | 8th | |
| Men's | 1968 Outdoor | Jerry Jobski | 10,000 meters | 7th | |
| Men's | 1968 Outdoor | Isiah Oakes | Shot put | 8th | |
| Men's | 1969 Outdoor | Chuck Labenz | Mile run | 4th | |
| Men's | 1969 Outdoor | Mark Murro | Javelin throw | 1st | |
| Men's | 1971 Outdoor | Mark Murro | Javelin throw | 2nd | |
| Men's | 1972 Outdoor | Maurice Peoples | 400 meters | 5th | |
| Men's | 1973 Outdoor | Maurice Peoples | 400 meters | 1st | |
| Men's | 1973 Outdoor | Charlie Wells | 4 × 100 meters relay | 2nd | |
| Men's | 1973 Outdoor | Carl McCullough | 4 × 100 meters relay | 2nd | |
| Men's | 1973 Outdoor | Phil Chewing | 4 × 100 meters relay | 2nd | |
| Men's | 1973 Outdoor | Maurice Peoples | 4 × 100 meters relay | 2nd | |
| Men's | 1973 Outdoor | Ray Manning | 4 × 400 meters relay | 3rd | |
| Men's | 1973 Outdoor | Carl McCullough | 4 × 400 meters relay | 3rd | |
| Men's | 1973 Outdoor | Gary Lewis | 4 × 400 meters relay | 3rd | |
| Men's | 1973 Outdoor | Maurice Peoples | 4 × 400 meters relay | 3rd | |
| Men's | 1973 Outdoor | Ron Semkiw | Shot put | 5th | |
| Men's | 1974 Outdoor | Carl McCullough | 200 meters | 6th | |
| Men's | 1974 Outdoor | Frank Robinson | 4 × 100 meters relay | 6th | |
| Men's | 1974 Outdoor | Carl McCullough | 4 × 100 meters relay | 6th | |
| Men's | 1974 Outdoor | Darryl Hughes | 4 × 100 meters relay | 6th | |
| Men's | 1974 Outdoor | Steven Williams | 4 × 100 meters relay | 6th | |
| Men's | 1975 Outdoor | Charlie Wells | 100 meters | 7th | |
| Men's | 1975 Outdoor | Herman Frazier | 400 meters | 2nd | |
| Men's | 1975 Outdoor | Charlie Wells | 4 × 100 meters relay | 3rd | |
| Men's | 1975 Outdoor | Carl McCullough | 4 × 100 meters relay | 3rd | |
| Men's | 1975 Outdoor | Julius Fletcher | 4 × 100 meters relay | 3rd | |
| Men's | 1975 Outdoor | Herman Frazier | 4 × 100 meters relay | 3rd | |
| Men's | 1975 Outdoor | Trevor Hall | Triple jump | 6th | |
| Men's | 1976 Indoor | Herman Frazier | 400 meters | 2nd | |
| Men's | 1976 Outdoor | Gary Burl | 110 meters hurdles | 4th | |
| Men's | 1976 Outdoor | Carl McCullough | 200 meters | 7th | |
| Men's | 1976 Outdoor | Herman Frazier | 400 meters | 2nd | |
| Men's | 1976 Outdoor | Rick Walker | 400 meters hurdles | 6th | |
| Men's | 1976 Outdoor | Charlie Wells | 4 × 100 meters relay | 4th | |
| Men's | 1976 Outdoor | Steven Williams | 4 × 100 meters relay | 4th | |
| Men's | 1976 Outdoor | Carl McCullough | 4 × 100 meters relay | 4th | |
| Men's | 1976 Outdoor | Herman Frazier | 4 × 100 meters relay | 4th | |
| Men's | 1976 Outdoor | Clifton McKenzie | 4 × 400 meters relay | 1st | |
| Men's | 1976 Outdoor | Rich Walker | 4 × 400 meters relay | 1st | |
| Men's | 1976 Outdoor | Carl McCullough | 4 × 400 meters relay | 1st | |
| Men's | 1976 Outdoor | Herman Frazier | 4 × 400 meters relay | 1st | |
| Men's | 1976 Outdoor | Paul Underwood | High jump | 5th | |
| Men's | 1977 Outdoor | Rick Walker | 110 meters hurdles | 2nd | |
| Men's | 1977 Outdoor | Tony Darden | 200 meters | 2nd | |
| Men's | 1977 Outdoor | Herman Frazier | 400 meters | 1st | |
| Men's | 1977 Outdoor | Rich Walker | 400 meters hurdles | 5th | |
| Men's | 1977 Outdoor | Steven Williams | 4 × 100 meters relay | 2nd | |
| Men's | 1977 Outdoor | Tony Darden | 4 × 100 meters relay | 2nd | |
| Men's | 1977 Outdoor | Gerald Burl | 4 × 100 meters relay | 2nd | |
| Men's | 1977 Outdoor | Herman Frazier | 4 × 100 meters relay | 2nd | |
| Men's | 1977 Outdoor | Clifton McKenzie | 4 × 400 meters relay | 2nd | |
| Men's | 1977 Outdoor | Rich Walker | 4 × 400 meters relay | 2nd | |
| Men's | 1977 Outdoor | Gerald Burl | 4 × 400 meters relay | 2nd | |
| Men's | 1977 Outdoor | Herman Frazier | 4 × 400 meters relay | 2nd | |
| Men's | 1977 Outdoor | Kyle Arney | High jump | 1st | |
| Men's | 1977 Outdoor | Ralph Haynie | Pole vault | 3rd | |
| Men's | 1977 Outdoor | Dannie Jackson | Long jump | 4th | |
| Men's | 1978 Outdoor | Greg Moore | 100 meters | 7th | |
| Men's | 1978 Outdoor | Dannie Jackson | Long jump | 5th | |
| Men's | 1979 Outdoor | Sidney Mitchell | Long jump | 6th | |
| Men's | 1979 Outdoor | Scott Hersh | Discus throw | 8th | |
| Men's | 1980 Outdoor | Jeff Montpas | Decathlon | 5th | |
| Men's | 1981 Outdoor | Ron Brown | 100 meters | 5th | |
| Men's | 1981 Outdoor | Dwayne Evans | 200 meters | 1st | |
| Men's | 1981 Outdoor | Howard Henley | 400 meters | 2nd | |
| Men's | 1981 Outdoor | Ron Brown | 4 × 100 meters relay | 4th | |
| Men's | 1981 Outdoor | Howard Henley | 4 × 100 meters relay | 4th | |
| Men's | 1981 Outdoor | Greg Moore | 4 × 100 meters relay | 4th | |
| Men's | 1981 Outdoor | Dwayne Evans | 4 × 100 meters relay | 4th | |
| Men's | 1981 Outdoor | Leon Tubbs | 4 × 400 meters relay | 3rd | |
| Men's | 1981 Outdoor | Mike Sullivan | 4 × 400 meters relay | 3rd | |
| Men's | 1981 Outdoor | Greg Moore | 4 × 400 meters relay | 3rd | |
| Men's | 1981 Outdoor | Willie Jones | 4 × 400 meters relay | 3rd | |
| Men's | 1981 Outdoor | LaMonte King | Long jump | 7th | |
| Men's | 1981 Outdoor | Dannie Jackson | Decathlon | 3rd | |
| Men's | 1982 Indoor | Eddie Davis | 4 × 800 meters relay | 2nd | |
| Men's | 1982 Indoor | Pete Richardson | 4 × 800 meters relay | 2nd | |
| Men's | 1982 Indoor | Michael Schwarz | 4 × 800 meters relay | 2nd | |
| Men's | 1982 Indoor | Pete Quinonez | 4 × 800 meters relay | 2nd | |
| Men's | 1982 Outdoor | John Lenstrohm | 400 meters hurdles | 6th | |
| Men's | 1982 Outdoor | Leon Tubbs | 4 × 100 meters relay | 6th | |
| Men's | 1982 Outdoor | Willie Jones | 4 × 100 meters relay | 6th | |
| Men's | 1982 Outdoor | Walter Haywood | 4 × 100 meters relay | 6th | |
| Men's | 1982 Outdoor | John Lenstrohm | 4 × 100 meters relay | 6th | |
| Men's | 1982 Outdoor | Deon Mayfield | Triple jump | 8th | |
| Men's | 1982 Outdoor | John Irvine | Decathlon | 6th | |
| Women's | 1982 Outdoor | Leslie Deniz | Discus throw | 2nd | |
| Men's | 1983 Indoor | Eddie Davis | 4 × 800 meters relay | 2nd | |
| Men's | 1983 Indoor | Herbert Richardson | 4 × 800 meters relay | 2nd | |
| Men's | 1983 Indoor | Michael Schwarz | 4 × 800 meters relay | 2nd | |
| Men's | 1983 Indoor | Treg Scott | 4 × 800 meters relay | 2nd | |
| Men's | 1983 Outdoor | Scott Walker | 400 meters hurdles | 6th | |
| Men's | 1983 Outdoor | Pete Richardson | 800 meters | 6th | |
| Men's | 1983 Outdoor | Walter Haywood | 4 × 100 meters relay | 4th | |
| Men's | 1983 Outdoor | Kent Gapen | 4 × 100 meters relay | 4th | |
| Men's | 1983 Outdoor | Bernard Mathis | 4 × 100 meters relay | 4th | |
| Men's | 1983 Outdoor | Ken Robinson | 4 × 100 meters relay | 4th | |
| Men's | 1983 Outdoor | Deon Mayfield | Triple jump | 7th | |
| Women's | 1983 Outdoor | Sharon Ware | 100 meters | 5th | |
| Women's | 1983 Outdoor | Sabrina Peters | 3000 meters | 6th | |
| Women's | 1983 Outdoor | Leslie Deniz | Discus throw | 1st | |
| Men's | 1984 Indoor | Eddie Davis | 1000 meters | 5th | |
| Men's | 1984 Outdoor | Pete Richardson | 800 meters | 3rd | |
| Men's | 1984 Outdoor | Steve Tully | Pole vault | 8th | |
| Men's | 1984 Outdoor | Ken Frazier | Long jump | 8th | |
| Men's | 1984 Outdoor | Deon Mayfield | Triple jump | 7th | |
| Women's | 1984 Outdoor | Lynn Nelson | 5000 meters | 3rd | |
| Women's | 1984 Outdoor | Anna Van | Long jump | 5th | |
| Women's | 1984 Outdoor | Anna Van | Triple jump | 7th | |
| Women's | 1984 Outdoor | Natalie Kaaiawahia | Shot put | 4th | |
| Women's | 1984 Outdoor | Natalie Kaaiawahia | Discus throw | 5th | |
| Men's | 1985 Indoor | Treg Scott | 800 meters | 5th | |
| Women's | 1985 Outdoor | Lynn Nelson | 5000 meters | 8th | |
| Men's | 1986 Indoor | Andrew Parker | 55 meters hurdles | 2nd | |
| Women's | 1986 Indoor | Lynda Tolbert | 55 meters hurdles | 4th | |
| Men's | 1987 Indoor | Andrew Parker | 55 meters hurdles | 2nd | |
| Women's | 1987 Indoor | Lynda Tolbert | 55 meters | 4th | |
| Men's | 1987 Outdoor | Andrew Parker | 110 meters hurdles | 4th | |
| Men's | 1987 Outdoor | Gordon Bugg | 400 meters hurdles | 7th | |
| Women's | 1987 Outdoor | Lynda Tolbert | 100 meters hurdles | 3rd | |
| Women's | 1988 Indoor | Lynda Tolbert | 55 meters hurdles | 2nd | |
| Women's | 1988 Indoor | Jacinta Bartholomew | Long jump | 3rd | |
| Men's | 1988 Outdoor | Gordon Bugg | 400 meters hurdles | 3rd | |
| Women's | 1988 Outdoor | Lynda Tolbert | 100 meters hurdles | 1st | |
| Women's | 1988 Outdoor | Maicel Malone | 400 meters | 2nd | |
| Women's | 1988 Outdoor | Lynda Tolbert | 4 × 100 meters relay | 1st | |
| Women's | 1988 Outdoor | Tamika Foster | 4 × 100 meters relay | 1st | |
| Women's | 1988 Outdoor | Maicel Malone | 4 × 100 meters relay | 1st | |
| Women's | 1988 Outdoor | Jacinta Bartholomew | 4 × 100 meters relay | 1st | |
| Women's | 1988 Outdoor | Toinette Holmes | 4 × 400 meters relay | 3rd | |
| Women's | 1988 Outdoor | Maicel Malone | 4 × 400 meters relay | 3rd | |
| Women's | 1988 Outdoor | Jacinta Bartholomew | 4 × 400 meters relay | 3rd | |
| Women's | 1988 Outdoor | Tamika Foster | 4 × 400 meters relay | 3rd | |
| Women's | 1988 Outdoor | Jacinta Bartholomew | Long jump | 3rd | |
| Men's | 1990 Indoor | Shane Collins | Shot put | 2nd | |
| Women's | 1990 Indoor | Lynda Tolbert | 55 meters hurdles | 1st | |
| Women's | 1990 Indoor | Maicel Malone | 400 meters | 1st | |
| Men's | 1990 Outdoor | Robert Rucker | 400 meters hurdles | 7th | |
| Men's | 1990 Outdoor | Todd Lewis | 5000 meters | 8th | |
| Men's | 1990 Outdoor | Shane Collins | Shot put | 1st | |
| Women's | 1990 Outdoor | Lynda Tolbert | 100 meters hurdles | 1st | |
| Women's | 1990 Outdoor | Maicel Malone | 400 meters | 1st | |
| Women's | 1990 Outdoor | Toinette Holmes | 400 meters | 5th | |
| Women's | 1990 Outdoor | Gea Johnson | Heptathlon | 1st | |
| Men's | 1991 Indoor | Todd Lewis | 3000 meters | 5th | |
| Men's | 1991 Indoor | Ed Lovelace | 4 × 400 meters relay | 5th | |
| Men's | 1991 Indoor | Mike Sulcer | 4 × 400 meters relay | 5th | |
| Men's | 1991 Indoor | Robert Rucker | 4 × 400 meters relay | 5th | |
| Men's | 1991 Indoor | Thomas Koech | 4 × 400 meters relay | 5th | |
| Men's | 1991 Indoor | Nick Hysong | Pole vault | 6th | |
| Women's | 1991 Indoor | Maicel Malone | 400 meters | 1st | |
| Women's | 1991 Indoor | Toinette Holmes | 400 meters | 4th | |
| Women's | 1991 Indoor | Tionette Holmes | 4 × 400 meters relay | 1st | |
| Women's | 1991 Indoor | Dana Jones | 4 × 400 meters relay | 1st | |
| Women's | 1991 Indoor | Shanequa Campbell | 4 × 400 meters relay | 1st | |
| Women's | 1991 Indoor | Maicel Malone | 4 × 400 meters relay | 1st | |
| Men's | 1991 Outdoor | Robert Rucker | 400 meters hurdles | 5th | |
| Women's | 1991 Outdoor | Maicel Malone | 400 meters | 3rd | |
| Women's | 1991 Outdoor | Tesra Bester | 4 × 100 meters relay | 4th | |
| Women's | 1991 Outdoor | LaShawn Simmons | 4 × 100 meters relay | 4th | |
| Women's | 1991 Outdoor | Shanequa Campbell | 4 × 100 meters relay | 4th | |
| Women's | 1991 Outdoor | Maicel Malone | 4 × 100 meters relay | 4th | |
| Men's | 1992 Indoor | Gabe Beechum | High jump | 5th | |
| Men's | 1992 Indoor | Shane Collins | Shot put | 2nd | |
| Women's | 1992 Indoor | Ime Akpan | 55 meters hurdles | 5th | |
| Women's | 1992 Indoor | Maicel Malone | 400 meters | 1st | |
| Men's | 1992 Outdoor | Todd Lewis | 3000 meters steeplechase | 8th | |
| Men's | 1992 Outdoor | Gabe Beechum | High jump | 7th | |
| Men's | 1992 Outdoor | Nick Hysong | Pole vault | 7th | |
| Men's | 1992 Outdoor | Shane Collins | Shot put | 2nd | |
| Women's | 1992 Outdoor | Ime Akpan | 100 meters hurdles | 8th | |
| Women's | 1992 Outdoor | Tracy Mattes | 400 meters hurdles | 4th | |
| Women's | 1992 Outdoor | Kim Toney | 800 meters | 3rd | |
| Men's | 1993 Indoor | Gabe Beechum | High jump | 4th | |
| Men's | 1993 Indoor | Nick Hysong | Pole vault | 4th | |
| Men's | 1993 Indoor | Brian Ellis | Triple jump | 6th | |
| Women's | 1993 Indoor | Kim Toney | 800 meters | 4th | |
| Women's | 1993 Indoor | Shanequa Campbell | 4 × 400 meters relay | 4th | |
| Women's | 1993 Indoor | Janice Nichols | 4 × 400 meters relay | 4th | |
| Women's | 1993 Indoor | Tayo Akinremi | 4 × 400 meters relay | 4th | |
| Women's | 1993 Indoor | Lade Akinremi | 4 × 400 meters relay | 4th | |
| Men's | 1993 Outdoor | Nick Hysong | Pole vault | 5th | |
| Men's | 1993 Outdoor | Charlie Cohen | Javelin throw | 7th | |
| Women's | 1993 Outdoor | Ime Akpan | 100 meters hurdles | 2nd | |
| Women's | 1993 Outdoor | Shanequa Campbell | 400 meters | 8th | |
| Women's | 1993 Outdoor | Lade Akinremi | 400 meters hurdles | 7th | |
| Women's | 1993 Outdoor | Tayo Akinremi | 400 meters hurdles | 8th | |
| Women's | 1993 Outdoor | Kim Toney | 800 meters | 3rd | |
| Women's | 1993 Outdoor | Lade Akinremi | 4 × 400 meters relay | 2nd | |
| Women's | 1993 Outdoor | Tayo Akinremi | 4 × 400 meters relay | 2nd | |
| Women's | 1993 Outdoor | Kim Toney | 4 × 400 meters relay | 2nd | |
| Women's | 1993 Outdoor | Shanequa Campbell | 4 × 400 meters relay | 2nd | |
| Women's | 1993 Outdoor | Shelly Choppa | High jump | 8th | |
| Men's | 1994 Indoor | Nick Hysong | Pole vault | 2nd | |
| Women's | 1994 Indoor | Jacqui Gayle | 400 meters | 5th | |
| Women's | 1994 Indoor | Shanequa Campbell | 400 meters | 8th | |
| Women's | 1994 Indoor | Kim Toney | 800 meters | 5th | |
| Women's | 1994 Indoor | Lade Akinremi | 4 × 400 meters relay | 3rd | |
| Women's | 1994 Indoor | Tayo Akinremi | 4 × 400 meters relay | 3rd | |
| Women's | 1994 Indoor | Jacqui Gayle | 4 × 400 meters relay | 3rd | |
| Women's | 1994 Indoor | Shanequa Campbell | 4 × 400 meters relay | 3rd | |
| Men's | 1994 Outdoor | Nick Hysong | Pole vault | 1st | |
| Women's | 1994 Outdoor | Shanequa Campbell | 400 meters | 6th | |
| Women's | 1994 Outdoor | Lade Akinremi | 400 meters hurdles | 4th | |
| Women's | 1994 Outdoor | Kim Toney | 800 meters | 6th | |
| Women's | 1994 Outdoor | Tayo Akinremi | 4 × 400 meters relay | 3rd | |
| Women's | 1994 Outdoor | Jacqui Gayle | 4 × 400 meters relay | 3rd | |
| Women's | 1994 Outdoor | Lade Akinremi | 4 × 400 meters relay | 3rd | |
| Women's | 1994 Outdoor | Shanequa Campbell | 4 × 400 meters relay | 3rd | |
| Women's | 1994 Outdoor | Shelly Choppa | High jump | 7th | |
| Women's | 1995 Indoor | Lade Akinremi | 400 meters | 7th | |
| Women's | 1995 Indoor | Loriann Adams | 800 meters | 7th | |
| Women's | 1995 Indoor | Tayo Akinremi | 4 × 400 meters relay | 3rd | (Note: Team listed as Gayle, Tayo Akinremi, Morgan, and Tania Dailey by Arizona State archives) |
| Women's | 1995 Indoor | Jacqui Gayle | 4 × 400 meters relay | 3rd | (Note: Team listed as Gayle, Tayo Akinremi, Morgan, and Tania Dailey by Arizona State archives) |
| Women's | 1995 Indoor | Avia Morgan | 4 × 400 meters relay | 3rd | (Note: Team listed as Gayle, Tayo Akinremi, Morgan, and Tania Dailey by Arizona State archives) |
| Women's | 1995 Indoor | Lade Akinremi | 4 × 400 meters relay | 3rd | (Note: Team listed as Gayle, Tayo Akinremi, Morgan, and Tania Dailey by Arizona State archives) |
| Men's | 1995 Outdoor | Shante Williams | 4 × 400 meters relay | 6th | |
| Men's | 1995 Outdoor | Vondre Armour | 4 × 400 meters relay | 6th | |
| Men's | 1995 Outdoor | Clevon Clair | 4 × 400 meters relay | 6th | |
| Men's | 1995 Outdoor | Ivan Jean-Marie | 4 × 400 meters relay | 6th | |
| Women's | 1995 Outdoor | Lade Akinremi | 400 meters hurdles | 2nd | |
| Women's | 1995 Outdoor | Lorrieann Adams | 800 meters | 8th | |
| Women's | 1995 Outdoor | Tayo Akinremi | 4 × 400 meters relay | 3rd | |
| Women's | 1995 Outdoor | Jacqui Gayle | 4 × 400 meters relay | 3rd | |
| Women's | 1995 Outdoor | Avia Morgan | 4 × 400 meters relay | 3rd | |
| Women's | 1995 Outdoor | Lade Akinremi | 4 × 400 meters relay | 3rd | |
| Men's | 1996 Indoor | Mika Laiho | Weight throw | 5th | |
| Women's | 1996 Indoor | Fiona Daly | High jump | 6th | |
| Men's | 1996 Outdoor | Pal Arne Fagernes | Javelin throw | 1st | |
| Women's | 1996 Outdoor | Lorieann Adams | 800 meters | 2nd | |
| Women's | 1998 Indoor | Fiona Daly | High jump | 6th | |
| Men's | 1998 Outdoor | Mika Laiho | Hammer throw | 3rd | |
| Men's | 1999 Indoor | Marcus Brunson | 60 meters | 2nd | |
| Men's | 1999 Indoor | Marcus Brunson | 4 × 400 meters relay | 5th | |
| Men's | 1999 Indoor | Dwight Phillips | 4 × 400 meters relay | 5th | |
| Men's | 1999 Indoor | Vondre Armour | 4 × 400 meters relay | 5th | |
| Men's | 1999 Indoor | Tony Berrian | 4 × 400 meters relay | 5th | |
| Men's | 1999 Indoor | Dwight Phillips | Long jump | 2nd | |
| Women's | 1999 Indoor | Arlaina Davis | 4 × 400 meters relay | 7th | |
| Women's | 1999 Indoor | Joronda White | 4 × 400 meters relay | 7th | |
| Women's | 1999 Indoor | Candida Coulson | 4 × 400 meters relay | 7th | |
| Women's | 1999 Indoor | Dawnyell Linder | 4 × 400 meters relay | 7th | |
| Women's | 1999 Indoor | Fiona Daly | High jump | 5th | |
| Men's | 1999 Outdoor | Tony Berrian | 400 meters | 8th | |
| Men's | 1999 Outdoor | LaVell Robinson-Blanchard | 4 × 400 meters relay | 6th | |
| Men's | 1999 Outdoor | Vondre Armour | 4 × 400 meters relay | 6th | |
| Men's | 1999 Outdoor | Marcus Brunson | 4 × 400 meters relay | 6th | |
| Men's | 1999 Outdoor | Tony Berrian | 4 × 400 meters relay | 6th | |
| Men's | 1999 Outdoor | Dwight Phillips | Long jump | 4th | |
| Men's | 1999 Outdoor | Dwight Phillips | Triple jump | 4th | |
| Men's | 2000 Indoor | Tony Berrian | 400 meters | 3rd | |
| Men's | 2000 Indoor | Brandon Strong | Distance medley relay | 8th | |
| Men's | 2000 Indoor | LaVell Robinson-Blanchard | Distance medley relay | 8th | |
| Men's | 2000 Indoor | David Burke | Distance medley relay | 8th | |
| Men's | 2000 Indoor | Garrett Jensen | Distance medley relay | 8th | |
| Men's | 2000 Indoor | Dwight Phillips | Long jump | 2nd | |
| Men's | 2000 Indoor | Dwight Phillips | Triple jump | 8th | |
| Women's | 2000 Indoor | Lisa Aguilera | Mile run | 7th | |
| Women's | 2000 Indoor | Kelly MacDonald | 5000 meters | 7th | |
| Women's | 2000 Indoor | Valerie Williams | Long jump | 6th | |
| Women's | 2000 Indoor | Tiffany Greer | Long jump | 8th | |
| Men's | 2000 Outdoor | Dwight Phillips | 4 × 100 meters relay | 4th | |
| Men's | 2000 Outdoor | LaVell Robinson-Blanchard | 4 × 100 meters relay | 4th | |
| Men's | 2000 Outdoor | Jim McGee | 4 × 100 meters relay | 4th | |
| Men's | 2000 Outdoor | Marcus Brunson | 4 × 100 meters relay | 4th | |
| Men's | 2000 Outdoor | Dwight Phillips | Long jump | 2nd | |
| Women's | 2000 Outdoor | Lisa Aguilera | 1500 meters | 8th | |
| Women's | 2000 Outdoor | Tiffany Greer | Long jump | 4th | |
| Women's | 2001 Indoor | Kelly MacDonald | 5000 meters | 5th | |
| Women's | 2001 Indoor | Adrienne Judie | Weight throw | 4th | |
| Men's | 2001 Outdoor | Marcus Brunson | 100 meters | 3rd | |
| Men's | 2001 Outdoor | Marcus Brunson | 200 meters | 4th | |
| Men's | 2001 Outdoor | Fasil Bizuneh | 10,000 meters | 6th | |
| Men's | 2001 Outdoor | Michael Campbell | 4 × 400 meters relay | 4th | |
| Men's | 2001 Outdoor | Marcus Brunson | 4 × 400 meters relay | 4th | |
| Men's | 2001 Outdoor | Pete Lopez | 4 × 400 meters relay | 4th | |
| Men's | 2001 Outdoor | Tony Berrian | 4 × 400 meters relay | 4th | |
| Women's | 2001 Outdoor | Kelly MacDonald | 3000 meters steeplechase | 3rd | |
| Women's | 2001 Outdoor | Kelly MacDonald | 5000 meters | 3rd | |
| Women's | 2001 Outdoor | Tiffany Greer | Long jump | 3rd | |
| Men's | 2002 Indoor | David Wood | Shot put | 6th | |
| Women's | 2002 Indoor | Lisa Aguilera | 3000 meters | 2nd | |
| Women's | 2002 Indoor | Tiffany Greer | Long jump | 3rd | |
| Men's | 2002 Outdoor | Lorenzo Parham | 4 × 400 meters relay | 8th | |
| Men's | 2002 Outdoor | Steve Fitch | 4 × 400 meters relay | 8th | |
| Men's | 2002 Outdoor | Pete Lopez | 4 × 400 meters relay | 8th | |
| Men's | 2002 Outdoor | Seth Amoo | 4 × 400 meters relay | 8th | |
| Women's | 2002 Outdoor | Lisa Aguilera | 3000 meters steeplechase | 6th | |
| Women's | 2002 Outdoor | Tiffany Greer | Long jump | 2nd | |
| Men's | 2003 Indoor | Jason Barton | 4 × 400 meters relay | 5th | |
| Men's | 2003 Indoor | Seth Amoo | 4 × 400 meters relay | 5th | |
| Men's | 2003 Indoor | Steve Fitch | 4 × 400 meters relay | 5th | |
| Men's | 2003 Indoor | Lewis Banda | 4 × 400 meters relay | 5th | |
| Women's | 2003 Indoor | Lisa Aguilera | 3000 meters | 7th | |
| Women's | 2003 Outdoor | Lisa Aguilera | 3000 meters steeplechase | 5th | |
| Women's | 2003 Outdoor | Cassandra Reed | 4 × 400 meters relay | 6th | |
| Women's | 2003 Outdoor | Kandace Tucker | 4 × 400 meters relay | 6th | |
| Women's | 2003 Outdoor | Seneca Holmes | 4 × 400 meters relay | 6th | |
| Women's | 2003 Outdoor | Joni Smith | 4 × 400 meters relay | 6th | |
| Women's | 2003 Outdoor | Tiffany Greer | Long jump | 7th | |
| Men's | 2004 Indoor | Domenik Peterson | 200 meters | 4th | |
| Men's | 2004 Indoor | Jason Barton | 400 meters | 3rd | |
| Men's | 2004 Indoor | Lewis Banda | 4 × 400 meters relay | 3rd | |
| Men's | 2004 Indoor | Jason Barton | 4 × 400 meters relay | 3rd | |
| Men's | 2004 Indoor | Seth Amoo | 4 × 400 meters relay | 3rd | |
| Men's | 2004 Indoor | Domenik Peterson | 4 × 400 meters relay | 3rd | |
| Women's | 2004 Indoor | Jackie Johnson | Pentathlon | 2nd | |
| Men's | 2004 Outdoor | Lewis Banda | 400 meters | 4th | |
| Men's | 2004 Outdoor | Lewis Banda | 400 meters | 4th | |
| Men's | 2004 Outdoor | Jason Barton | 400 meters | 5th | |
| Men's | 2004 Outdoor | Steven Koehnemann | 4 × 100 meters relay | 2nd | |
| Men's | 2004 Outdoor | Domenick Peterson | 4 × 100 meters relay | 2nd | |
| Men's | 2004 Outdoor | Seth Amoo | 4 × 100 meters relay | 2nd | |
| Men's | 2004 Outdoor | Lewis Banda | 4 × 100 meters relay | 2nd | |
| Men's | 2004 Outdoor | Jason Barton | 4 × 400 meters relay | 4th | |
| Men's | 2004 Outdoor | Seth Amoo | 4 × 400 meters relay | 4th | |
| Men's | 2004 Outdoor | Domenik Peterson | 4 × 400 meters relay | 4th | |
| Men's | 2004 Outdoor | Lewis Banda | 4 × 400 meters relay | 4th | |
| Women's | 2004 Outdoor | Marcia Smith | 4 × 400 meters relay | 7th | |
| Women's | 2004 Outdoor | Kandace Tucker | 4 × 400 meters relay | 7th | |
| Women's | 2004 Outdoor | Christina Hardeman | 4 × 400 meters relay | 7th | |
| Women's | 2004 Outdoor | Cassandra Reed | 4 × 400 meters relay | 7th | |
| Women's | 2004 Outdoor | Jackie Johnson | Heptathlon | 1st | |
| Men's | 2005 Indoor | Domenik Peterson | 200 meters | 4th | |
| Men's | 2005 Indoor | Brandon Glenn | Pole vault | 7th | |
| Men's | 2005 Indoor | Trevell Quinley | Long jump | 2nd | |
| Women's | 2005 Indoor | Amy Cragg | 5000 meters | 5th | |
| Men's | 2005 Outdoor | Seth Amoo | 200 meters | 6th | |
| Men's | 2005 Outdoor | Rich Allen | 4 × 400 meters relay | 2nd | |
| Men's | 2005 Outdoor | Seth Amoo | 4 × 400 meters relay | 2nd | |
| Men's | 2005 Outdoor | Domenick Peterson | 4 × 400 meters relay | 2nd | |
| Men's | 2005 Outdoor | Lewis Banda | 4 × 400 meters relay | 2nd | |
| Men's | 2005 Outdoor | Trevell Quinley | Long jump | 4th | |
| Men's | 2006 Indoor | Joshua Kinnaman | Heptathlon | 8th | |
| Women's | 2006 Indoor | Jenna Kingma | 3000 meters | 6th | |
| Women's | 2006 Indoor | Amy Cragg | 5000 meters | 1st | |
| Women's | 2006 Indoor | Victoria Jackson | 5000 meters | 8th | |
| Women's | 2006 Indoor | Sarah Stevens | Shot put | 3rd | |
| Women's | 2006 Indoor | Jackie Johnson | Pentathlon | 1st | |
| Men's | 2006 Outdoor | Aaron Aguayo | 3000 meters steeplechase | 3rd | |
| Men's | 2006 Outdoor | Joshua Kinnaman | Decathlon | 6th | |
| Women's | 2006 Outdoor | Victoria Jackson | 10,000 meters | 1st | |
| Women's | 2006 Outdoor | Amy Cragg | 10,000 meters | 4th | |
| Women's | 2006 Outdoor | Sara Stevens | Shot put | 4th | |
| Women's | 2006 Outdoor | Jessica Pressley | Shot put | 6th | |
| Women's | 2006 Outdoor | Jessica Pressley | Discus throw | 5th | |
| Women's | 2006 Outdoor | Jackie Johnson | Heptathlon | 1st | |
| Men's | 2007 Indoor | Matt Turner | Long jump | 7th | |
| Men's | 2007 Indoor | Ryan Whiting | Shot put | 3rd | |
| Men's | 2007 Indoor | Joshua Kinnaman | Heptathlon | 8th | |
| Women's | 2007 Indoor | Amy Cragg | 3000 meters | 6th | |
| Women's | 2007 Indoor | Amy Cragg | 5000 meters | 4th | |
| Women's | 2007 Indoor | Sarah Stevens | Shot put | 1st | |
| Women's | 2007 Indoor | Jessica Pressley | Shot put | 3rd | |
| Women's | 2007 Indoor | Sarah Stevens | Weight throw | 5th | |
| Women's | 2007 Indoor | Jackie Johnson | Pentathlon | 1st | |
| Men's | 2007 Outdoor | Aaron Aguayo | 3000 meters steeplechase | 3rd | |
| Men's | 2007 Outdoor | Kyle Alcorn | 3000 meters steeplechase | 7th | |
| Men's | 2007 Outdoor | Ryan Whiting | Shot put | 4th | |
| Women's | 2007 Outdoor | Latosha Wallace | 400 meters hurdles | 4th | |
| Women's | 2007 Outdoor | Amy Cragg | 10,000 meters | 4th | |
| Women's | 2007 Outdoor | Bridgette Williams | 4 × 400 meters relay | 8th | |
| Women's | 2007 Outdoor | Shauntel Elcock | 4 × 400 meters relay | 8th | |
| Women's | 2007 Outdoor | Jordan Durham | 4 × 400 meters relay | 8th | |
| Women's | 2007 Outdoor | Latosha Wallace | 4 × 400 meters relay | 8th | |
| Women's | 2007 Outdoor | April Kubishta | Pole vault | 1st | |
| Women's | 2007 Outdoor | Jessica Pressley | Shot put | 1st | |
| Women's | 2007 Outdoor | Sarah Stevens | Shot put | 3rd | |
| Women's | 2007 Outdoor | Tai Battle | Discus throw | 2nd | |
| Women's | 2007 Outdoor | Sarah Stevens | Hammer throw | 4th | |
| Women's | 2007 Outdoor | Jackie Johnson | Heptathlon | 1st | |
| Men's | 2008 Indoor | Joel Phillip | 400 meters | 2nd | |
| Men's | 2008 Indoor | Jimmie Gordon | 400 meters | 8th | |
| Men's | 2008 Indoor | Kyle Alcorn | 3000 meters | 1st | |
| Men's | 2008 Indoor | Jimmie Gordon | 4 × 400 meters relay | 3rd | |
| Men's | 2008 Indoor | Darryl Elston | 4 × 400 meters relay | 3rd | |
| Men's | 2008 Indoor | Justin Kremer | 4 × 400 meters relay | 3rd | |
| Men's | 2008 Indoor | Joel Phillip | 4 × 400 meters relay | 3rd | |
| Men's | 2008 Indoor | Joey Heller | Distance medley relay | 2nd | |
| Men's | 2008 Indoor | Justin Kremer | Distance medley relay | 2nd | |
| Men's | 2008 Indoor | Nectaly Barbosa | Distance medley relay | 2nd | |
| Men's | 2008 Indoor | Kyle Alcorn | Distance medley relay | 2nd | |
| Men's | 2008 Indoor | Matt Turner | Long jump | 8th | |
| Men's | 2008 Indoor | Ryan Whiting | Shot put | 1st | |
| Women's | 2008 Indoor | Dominique Maloy | 4 × 400 meters relay | 3rd | |
| Women's | 2008 Indoor | Shauntel Elcock | 4 × 400 meters relay | 3rd | |
| Women's | 2008 Indoor | Jordan Durham | 4 × 400 meters relay | 3rd | |
| Women's | 2008 Indoor | Jeavon Benjamin | 4 × 400 meters relay | 3rd | |
| Women's | 2008 Indoor | April Kubishta | Pole vault | 2nd | |
| Women's | 2008 Indoor | Jackie Johnson | Long jump | 5th | |
| Women's | 2008 Indoor | Stephanie Garnett | Long jump | 6th | |
| Women's | 2008 Indoor | Sarah Stevens | Shot put | 2nd | |
| Women's | 2008 Indoor | Jessica Pressley | Shot put | 5th | |
| Women's | 2008 Indoor | Jessica Pressley | Weight throw | 2nd | |
| Women's | 2008 Indoor | Jackie Johnson | Pentathlon | 1st | |
| Men's | 2008 Outdoor | Joel Phillip | 400 meters | 7th | |
| Men's | 2008 Outdoor | Kyle Alcorn | 3000 meters steeplechase | 1st | |
| Men's | 2008 Outdoor | Matt Turner | Long jump | 2nd | |
| Men's | 2008 Outdoor | Ryan Whiting | Shot put | 2nd | |
| Women's | 2008 Outdoor | Dominiqué Maloy | 4 × 400 meters relay | 5th | |
| Women's | 2008 Outdoor | Jordan Durham | 4 × 400 meters relay | 5th | |
| Women's | 2008 Outdoor | Shauntel Elcock | 4 × 400 meters relay | 5th | |
| Women's | 2008 Outdoor | Jeavon Benjamin | 4 × 400 meters relay | 5th | |
| Women's | 2008 Outdoor | April Kubishta | Pole vault | 4th | |
| Women's | 2008 Outdoor | Jessica Pressley | Shot put | 1st | |
| Women's | 2008 Outdoor | Sarah Stevens | Shot put | 6th | |
| Women's | 2008 Outdoor | Sarah Stevens | Discus throw | 1st | |
| Women's | 2008 Outdoor | Tai Battle | Discus throw | 2nd | |
| Women's | 2008 Outdoor | Jessica Pressley | Discus throw | 7th | |
| Women's | 2008 Outdoor | Sarah Stevens | Hammer throw | 3rd | |
| Women's | 2008 Outdoor | Jessica Pressley | Hammer throw | 4th | |
| Women's | 2008 Outdoor | Jackie Johnson | Heptathlon | 1st | |
| Men's | 2009 Indoor | Ryan Whiting | Shot put | 1st | |
| Men's | 2009 Indoor | Jason Lewis | Shot put | 4th | |
| Men's | 2009 Indoor | Jason Lewis | Weight throw | 1st | |
| Women's | 2009 Indoor | Charonda Williams | 60 meters | 6th | |
| Women's | 2009 Indoor | Charonda Williams | 200 meters | 3rd | |
| Women's | 2009 Indoor | Dominiqué Malloy | 4 × 400 meters relay | 2nd | |
| Women's | 2009 Indoor | Shauntel Elcock | 4 × 400 meters relay | 2nd | |
| Women's | 2009 Indoor | Charonda Williams | 4 × 400 meters relay | 2nd | |
| Women's | 2009 Indoor | Jeavon Benjamin | 4 × 400 meters relay | 2nd | |
| Women's | 2009 Indoor | Sarah Stevens | Shot put | 2nd | |
| Women's | 2009 Indoor | Sarah Stevens | Weight throw | 4th | |
| Men's | 2009 Outdoor | Brandon Bethke | 5000 meters | 4th | |
| Men's | 2009 Outdoor | Ryan Whiting | Shot put | 1st | |
| Men's | 2009 Outdoor | Ryan Whiting | Discus throw | 2nd | |
| Men's | 2009 Outdoor | Jason Lewis | Discus throw | 6th | |
| Men's | 2009 Outdoor | Jason Lewis | Hammer throw | 6th | |
| Women's | 2009 Outdoor | Charonda Williams | 100 meters | 6th | |
| Women's | 2009 Outdoor | Charonda Williams | 200 meters | 2nd | |
| Women's | 2009 Outdoor | Dominiqué Maloy | 4 × 100 meters relay | 6th | |
| Women's | 2009 Outdoor | Kayla Sanchez | 4 × 100 meters relay | 6th | |
| Women's | 2009 Outdoor | Jasmine Chaney | 4 × 100 meters relay | 6th | |
| Women's | 2009 Outdoor | Charonda Williams | 4 × 100 meters relay | 6th | |
| Women's | 2009 Outdoor | Shauntel Elcock | 4 × 400 meters relay | 5th | |
| Women's | 2009 Outdoor | Jasmine Chaney | 4 × 400 meters relay | 5th | |
| Women's | 2009 Outdoor | Dominiqué Maloy | 4 × 400 meters relay | 5th | |
| Women's | 2009 Outdoor | Jeavon Benjamin | 4 × 400 meters relay | 5th | |
| Women's | 2009 Outdoor | Sarah Stevens | Shot put | 2nd | |
| Women's | 2009 Outdoor | Sarah Stevens | Discus throw | 2nd | |
| Women's | 2009 Outdoor | CJ Navarro | Discus throw | 8th | |
| Women's | 2009 Outdoor | Sarah Stevens | Hammer throw | 3rd | |
| Men's | 2010 Indoor | Brandon Bethke | 3000 meters | 4th | |
| Men's | 2010 Indoor | Donald Sanford | 4 × 400 meters relay | 8th | |
| Men's | 2010 Indoor | Justin Kremer | 4 × 400 meters relay | 8th | |
| Men's | 2010 Indoor | Ray Miller | 4 × 400 meters relay | 8th | |
| Men's | 2010 Indoor | Joel Phillip | 4 × 400 meters relay | 8th | |
| Men's | 2010 Indoor | Ryan Whiting | Shot put | 1st | |
| Men's | 2010 Indoor | Jason Lewis | Shot put | 7th | |
| Men's | 2010 Indoor | Jason Lewis | Weight throw | 6th | |
| Men's | 2010 Outdoor | Donald Sanford | 400 meters | 2nd | |
| Men's | 2010 Outdoor | Justin Kremer | 4 × 400 meters relay | 8th | |
| Men's | 2010 Outdoor | Allante Battle | 4 × 400 meters relay | 8th | |
| Men's | 2010 Outdoor | Donald Sanford | 4 × 400 meters relay | 8th | |
| Men's | 2010 Outdoor | Joel Phillip | 4 × 400 meters relay | 8th | |
| Men's | 2010 Outdoor | Ryan Whiting | Shot put | 1st | |
| Men's | 2010 Outdoor | Jordan Clarke | Shot put | 5th | |
| Men's | 2010 Outdoor | Jason Lewis | Shot put | 7th | |
| Men's | 2010 Outdoor | Ryan Whiting | Discus throw | 1st | |
| Men's | 2010 Outdoor | Jason Lewis | Discus throw | 7th | |
| Women's | 2010 Outdoor | Jasmine Chaney | 400 meters hurdles | 5th | |
| Women's | 2011 Indoor | Anna Jelmini | Shot put | 5th | |
| Men's | 2011 Outdoor | Jordan Clarke | Shot put | 1st | |
| Women's | 2011 Outdoor | Jasmine Chaney | 400 meters hurdles | 4th | |
| Women's | 2011 Outdoor | Christabel Nettey | Long jump | 7th | |
| Women's | 2011 Outdoor | Anna Jelmini | Discus throw | 2nd | |
| Men's | 2012 Indoor | Mason McHenry | 800 meters | 1st | |
| Men's | 2012 Indoor | Bryan McBride | High jump | 6th | |
| Men's | 2012 Indoor | Chris Benard | Triple jump | 2nd | |
| Men's | 2012 Indoor | Jordan Clarke | Shot put | 1st | |
| Women's | 2012 Indoor | Anna Jelmini | Shot put | 5th | |
| Men's | 2012 Outdoor | Derick Hinch | Pole vault | 3rd | |
| Men's | 2012 Outdoor | Chris Benard | Triple jump | 7th | |
| Men's | 2012 Outdoor | Jordan Clarke | Shot put | 1st | |
| Women's | 2012 Outdoor | Christabel Nettey | Long jump | 8th | |
| Women's | 2012 Outdoor | Anna Jelmini | Discus throw | 2nd | |
| Women's | 2012 Outdoor | Keia Pinnick | Heptathlon | 5th | |
| Men's | 2013 Indoor | Derick Hinch | Pole vault | 6th | |
| Men's | 2013 Indoor | Jordan Clarke | Shot put | 1st | |
| Women's | 2013 Indoor | Christabel Nettey | Long jump | 2nd | |
| Women's | 2013 Indoor | Anna Jelmini | Shot put | 5th | |
| Women's | 2013 Indoor | Chelsea Cassulo | Weight throw | 4th | |
| Women's | 2013 Indoor | Keia Pinnick | Pentathlon | 2nd | |
| Men's | 2013 Outdoor | Jordan Clarke | Shot put | 2nd | |
| Women's | 2013 Outdoor | Shelby Houlihan | 1500 meters | 7th | |
| Women's | 2013 Outdoor | Anna Jelmini | Discus throw | 1st | |
| Women's | 2013 Outdoor | Chelsea Cassulo | Hammer throw | 1st | |
| Women's | 2013 Outdoor | Keia Pinnick | Heptathlon | 3rd | |
| Men's | 2014 Indoor | Ryan Milus | 60 meters | 2nd | |
| Women's | 2014 Indoor | Shelby Houlihan | Mile run | 3rd | |
| Women's | 2014 Indoor | Anna Jelmini | Shot put | 7th | |
| Men's | 2014 Outdoor | Ryan Milus | 4 × 100 meters relay | 7th | |
| Men's | 2014 Outdoor | William Henry | 4 × 100 meters relay | 7th | |
| Men's | 2014 Outdoor | Devan Spann | 4 × 100 meters relay | 7th | |
| Men's | 2014 Outdoor | Daveon Collins | 4 × 100 meters relay | 7th | |
| Men's | 2014 Outdoor | Keith Cleveland | 4 × 400 meters relay | 5th | |
| Men's | 2014 Outdoor | William Henry | 4 × 400 meters relay | 5th | |
| Men's | 2014 Outdoor | Daveon Collins | 4 × 400 meters relay | 5th | |
| Men's | 2014 Outdoor | Devan Spann | 4 × 400 meters relay | 5th | |
| Men's | 2014 Outdoor | Bryan McBride | High jump | 1st | |
| Women's | 2014 Outdoor | Shelby Houlihan | 1500 meters | 1st | |
| Men's | 2015 Indoor | William Taylor | 60 meters hurdles | 4th | |
| Men's | 2015 Indoor | Bryan McBride | Long jump | 8th | |
| Women's | 2015 Indoor | Brianna Tate | 400 meters | 7th | |
| Women's | 2015 Indoor | Shelby Houlihan | Mile run | 2nd | |
| Women's | 2015 Indoor | Shelby Houlihan | 3000 meters | 8th | |
| Men's | 2015 Outdoor | Bryan McBride | High jump | 6th | |
| Men's | 2015 Outdoor | Michael Ohakwe | Discus throw | 8th | |
| Women's | 2015 Outdoor | Shelby Houlihan | 1500 meters | 2nd | |
| Women's | 2015 Outdoor | Shelby Houlihan | 5000 meters | 7th | |
| Men's | 2016 Outdoor | Benjamin Trotter | 4 × 100 meters relay | 8th | |
| Men's | 2016 Outdoor | Isiah Underwood | 4 × 100 meters relay | 8th | |
| Men's | 2016 Outdoor | Brandon Hasson | 4 × 100 meters relay | 8th | |
| Men's | 2016 Outdoor | Reggie Lewis | 4 × 100 meters relay | 8th | |
| Men's | 2016 Outdoor | Timothy White | Triple jump | 4th | |
| Women's | 2016 Outdoor | Maggie Ewen | Discus throw | 8th | |
| Women's | 2016 Outdoor | Maggie Ewen | Hammer throw | 5th | |
| Women's | 2017 Indoor | Maggie Ewen | Shot put | 4th | |
| Women's | 2017 Indoor | Maggie Ewen | Weight throw | 6th | |
| Men's | 2017 Outdoor | Kyle Long | Discus throw | 8th | |
| Women's | 2017 Outdoor | Maggie Ewen | Shot put | 6th | |
| Women's | 2017 Outdoor | Maggie Ewen | Discus throw | 2nd | |
| Women's | 2017 Outdoor | Maggie Ewen | Hammer throw | 1st | |
| Women's | 2018 Indoor | Maggie Ewen | Shot put | 1st | |
| Women's | 2018 Indoor | Maggie Ewen | Weight throw | 4th | |
| Women's | 2018 Outdoor | Maggie Ewen | Shot put | 1st | |
| Women's | 2018 Outdoor | Samantha Noennig | Shot put | 7th | |
| Women's | 2018 Outdoor | Maggie Ewen | Discus throw | 1st | |
| Men's | 2019 Indoor | William Paulson | Mile run | 5th | |
| Women's | 2019 Indoor | Samantha Noennig | Shot put | 1st | |
| Men's | 2019 Outdoor | William Paulson | 1500 meters | 5th | |
| Women's | 2019 Outdoor | Samantha Noennig | Shot put | 1st | |
| Women's | 2019 Outdoor | Beatrice Llano | Hammer throw | 7th | |
| Men's | 2021 Indoor | Turner Washington | Shot put | 1st | |
| Women's | 2021 Indoor | Jorinde van Klinken | Shot put | 3rd | |
| Men's | 2021 Outdoor | Jamar Marshall Jr. | 110 meters hurdles | 5th | |
| Men's | 2021 Outdoor | Turner Washington | Shot put | 1st | |
| Men's | 2021 Outdoor | Turner Washington | Discus throw | 1st | |
| Women's | 2021 Outdoor | Jorinde van Klinken | Discus throw | 1st | |
| Women's | 2021 Outdoor | Beatrice Llano | Hammer throw | 5th | |
| Women's | 2021 Outdoor | Alizee Minard | Javelin throw | 2nd | |
| Men's | 2022 Indoor | Jamar Marshall Jr. | 60 meters hurdles | 3rd | |
| Men's | 2022 Indoor | Turner Washington | Shot put | 1st | |
| Women's | 2022 Indoor | Jorinde van Klinken | Shot put | 1st | |
| Men's | 2022 Outdoor | Dayton Carlson | 800 meters | 6th | |
| Men's | 2022 Outdoor | Turner Washington | Shot put | 2nd | |
| Men's | 2022 Outdoor | Ralford Mullings | Discus throw | 3rd | |
| Women's | 2022 Outdoor | Jorinde van Klinken | Shot put | 2nd | |
| Women's | 2022 Outdoor | Jorinde van Klinken | Discus throw | 1st | |
| Women's | 2022 Outdoor | Beatrice Llano | Hammer throw | 3rd | |
| Women's | 2022 Outdoor | Shelby Moran | Hammer throw | 5th | |
| Men's | 2023 Indoor | Jalen Drayden | 4 × 400 meters relay | 4th | |
| Men's | 2023 Indoor | Jeremiah Curry | 4 × 400 meters relay | 4th | |
| Men's | 2023 Indoor | Dubem Nwachukwu | 4 × 400 meters relay | 4th | |
| Men's | 2023 Indoor | Justin Robinson | 4 × 400 meters relay | 4th | |
| Men's | 2023 Indoor | Turner Washington | Shot put | 3rd | |
| Men's | 2023 Outdoor | Justin Robinson | 400 meters | 4th | |
| Men's | 2023 Outdoor | Dubem Nwachukwu | 400 meters | 5th | |
| Men's | 2023 Outdoor | Gamali Felix | 400 meters | 8th | |
| Men's | 2023 Outdoor | Jalen Drayden | 4 × 100 meters relay | 4th | |
| Men's | 2023 Outdoor | Jeremiah Curry | 4 × 100 meters relay | 4th | |
| Men's | 2023 Outdoor | Trevin Moyer | 4 × 100 meters relay | 4th | |
| Men's | 2023 Outdoor | Justin Robinson | 4 × 100 meters relay | 4th | |
| Men's | 2023 Outdoor | Dubem Nwachukwu | 4 × 400 meters relay | 2nd | |
| Men's | 2023 Outdoor | Jeremiah Curry | 4 × 400 meters relay | 2nd | |
| Men's | 2023 Outdoor | Jalen Drayden | 4 × 400 meters relay | 2nd | |
| Men's | 2023 Outdoor | Justin Robinson | 4 × 400 meters relay | 2nd | |
| Men's | 2023 Outdoor | Turner Washington | Shot put | 2nd | |
| Men's | 2023 Outdoor | Turner Washington | Discus throw | 1st | |
| Women's | 2023 Outdoor | Sevanna Hanson | Pole vault | 4th | |
| Men's | 2024 Indoor | Justin Robinson | 4 × 400 meters relay | 1st | |
| Men's | 2024 Indoor | Kaleb Simpson | 4 × 400 meters relay | 1st | |
| Men's | 2024 Indoor | Jayden Davis | 4 × 400 meters relay | 1st | |
| Men's | 2024 Indoor | Gamali Felix | 4 × 400 meters relay | 1st | |
| Men's | 2024 Outdoor | Justin Robinson | 400 meters | 8th | |
| Men's | 2024 Outdoor | Jayden Davis | 4 × 400 meters relay | 4th | |
| Men's | 2024 Outdoor | Justin Robinson | 4 × 400 meters relay | 4th | |
| Men's | 2024 Outdoor | Kaleb Simpson | 4 × 400 meters relay | 4th | |
| Men's | 2024 Outdoor | Gamali Felix | 4 × 400 meters relay | 4th | |
| Men's | 2025 Indoor | Jayden Davis | 400 meters | 4th | |
| Men's | 2025 Indoor | Jayden Davis | 4 × 400 meters relay | 3rd | |
| Men's | 2025 Indoor | Josiah Anderson | 4 × 400 meters relay | 3rd | |
| Men's | 2025 Indoor | Trevin Moyer | 4 × 400 meters relay | 3rd | |
| Men's | 2025 Indoor | Malik Franklin | 4 × 400 meters relay | 3rd | |
| Men's | 2025 Outdoor | Jayden Davis | 400 meters | 2nd | |
| Men's | 2025 Outdoor | Jayden Davis | 400 meters | 6th | |

== See also ==
- List of Arizona State Sun Devils track and field athletes
- Category:Arizona State Sun Devils men's track and field athletes (57)
- Category:Arizona State Sun Devils women's track and field athletes (34)
