= Shot put at the NCAA Division I Outdoor Track and Field Championships =

This is a list of the NCAA Division I outdoor champions in the shot put. Measurement was conducted in imperial distances (feet and inches) until 1975. Metrication occurred in 1976, so all subsequent championships were measured in metric distances. The women's event was introduced in 1982.

== Winners ==
Key
A=Altitude assisted

Women's shot put winners
Year	Athlete	Team	Distance
1982	Meg Ritchie (GBR)	Arizona Wildcats	16.90 m (55 ft 5 1/4 in)
1983	Carol Cady	Stanford Cardinal	17.07 m (56 ft 0 in)
1984	Ramona Pagel	San Diego State Aztecs	17.27 m (56 ft 7 3/4 in)
1985	Regina Cavanaugh	Rice Owls	17.26 m (56 ft 7 1/2 in)
1986	Regina Cavanaugh	Rice Owls	17.31 m (56 ft 9 1/4 in)
1987	Regina Cavanaugh	Rice Owls	17.34 m (56 ft 10 1/2 in)
1988	Jennifer Ponath	Washington Huskies	16.57 m (54 ft 4 1/4 in)
1989	Carla Garrett	Arizona Wildcats	16.66 m (54 ft 7 3/4 in)
1990	Tracie Millett	UCLA Bruins	16.33 m (53 ft 6 3/4 in)
1991	Eileen Vanisi	Texas Longhorns	17.60 m (57 ft 8 3/4 in)
1992	Katrin Koch (GER)	Indiana Hoosiers	17.53 m (57 ft 6 in)
1993	Dawn Dumble]	UCLA Bruins	17.17 m (56 ft 3 3/4 in)
1994	Eileen Vanisi	Texas Longhorns	17.74 m (58 ft 2 1/4 in)
1995	Valeyta Althouse	UCLA Bruins	18.28 m (59 ft 11 1/2 in)
1996	Teri Steer	SMU Mustangs	17.98 m (58 ft 11 3/4 in)
1997	Tressa Thompson	Nebraska Cornhuskers	18.50 m (60 ft 8 1/4 in)
1998	Tressa Thompson	Nebraska Cornhuskers	18.65 m (61 ft 2 1/4 in)
1999	Seilala Sua	UCLA Bruins	17.60 m (57 ft 8 3/4 in)
2000	Seilala Sua	UCLA Bruins	17.36 m (56 ft 11 1/4 in)
2001	Christina Tolson	UCLA Bruins	17.39 m (57 ft 1/2 in)
2002	Jessica Cosby	UCLA Bruins	17.38 m (57 ft 1/4 in)
2003	Becky Breisch	Nebraska Cornhuskers	17.76 m (58 ft 3 in)
2004	Laura Gerraughty	North Carolina Tar Heels	18.26 m (59 ft 10 3/4 in)
2005	Kimberli Barrett (JAM)	Miami Hurricanes	18.20 m (59 ft 8 1/2 in)
2006	Laura Gerraughty	North Carolina Tar Heels	18.32 m (60 ft 1 1/4 in)
2007	Jessica Pressley	Arizona State Sun Devils	18.00 m (59 ft 1/2 in)
2008	Jessica Pressley	Arizona State Sun Devils	18.13 m (59 ft 5 3/4 in)
2009	Mariam Kevkhishvili (GEO)	Florida Gators	17.79 m (58 ft 4 1/4 in)
2010	Mariam Kevkhishvili (GEO)	Florida Gators	18.11 m (59 ft 4 3/4 in)
2011	Julie Labonte (CAN)	Arizona Wildcats	18.31 m (60 ft 3/4 in)
2012	Tia Brooks-Wannemacher	Oklahoma Sooners	18.44 m (60 ft 5 3/4 in)
2013	Tia Brooks-Wannemacher	Oklahoma Sooners	18.91 m (62 ft 1/4 in)
2014	Christina Hillman	Iowa State Cyclones	17.73 m (58 ft 2 in)
2015	Raven Saunders	Southern Illinois Salukis	18.35 m (60 ft 2 1/4 in)
2016	Raven Saunders	Ole Miss Rebels	19.33 m (63 ft 5 in)
2017	Danniel Thomas	Kent State Golden Flashes	19.15 m (62 ft 9 3/4 in)
2018	Maggie Ewen	Arizona State Sun Devils	19.17 m (62 ft 10 1/2 in)
2019	Samantha Noennig	Arizona State Sun Devils	18.14 m (59 ft 6 in)
2021	Adelaide Aquilla	Ohio State Buckeyes	18.98 m (62 ft 3 in)
2022	Adelaide Aquilla	Ohio State Buckeyes	19.64 m (64 ft 5 in)
2023	Axelina Johansson (SWE)	Nebraska Cornhuskers	18.94 m (62 ft 1 1/2 in)
2024	Jaida Ross	Oregon Ducks	19.57 m (64 ft 2 1/4 in)
2025	Mya Lesnar	Colorado State Rams	19.01 m (62 ft 4 1/4 in)
2026	Axelina Johansson (SWE)	Nebraska Cornhuskers	19.92 m (65 ft 4 1/4 in)

Men's shot put winners
Year	Athlete	Team	Distance
1921	Gus Pope	Washington Huskies	13.83 m (45 ft 4 1/4 in)
1922	Jack Merchant	California Golden Bears	13.57 m (44 ft 6 1/4 in)
1923	Norman Anderson	USC Trojans	14.22 m (46 ft 7 3/4 in)
1924	not held		
1925	Glenn Hartranft	Stanford Cardinal	15.24 m (50 ft 0 in)
1926	John Kuck	Emporia State Hornets	15.26 m (50 ft 3/4 in)
1927	Herman Brix	Washington Huskies	14.51 m (47 ft 7 1/4 in)
1928	Harlow Rothert	Stanford Cardinal	15.21 m (49 ft 10 3/4 in)
1929	Harlow Rothert	Stanford Cardinal	15.31 m (50 ft 2 3/4 in)
1930	Harlow Rothert	Stanford Cardinal	15.59 m (51 ft 1 3/4 in)
1931	Robert Hall	USC Trojans	15.16 m (49 ft 8 3/4 in)
1932	Hugh Rhea	Nebraska Cornhuskers	15.99 m (52 ft 5 1/2 in)
1933	Jack Torrance	LSU Tigers	16.10 m (52 ft 9 3/4 in)
1934	Jack Torrance	LSU Tigers	16.63 m (54 ft 6 1/2 in)
1935	Elwyn Dees	Kansas Jayhawks	15.57 m (51 ft 3/4 in)
1936	James Reynolds	Stanford Cardinal	15.38 m (50 ft 5 1/2 in)
1937	Sam Francis	Nebraska Cornhuskers	16.30 m (53 ft 5 1/2 in)
1938	Elmer Hackney	Kansas State Wildcats	15.76 m (51 ft 8 1/4 in)
1939	Elmer Hackney	Kansas State Wildcats	17.03 m (55 ft 10 1/4 in)
1940	Al Blozis	Georgetown Hoyas	17.08 m (56 ft 1/4 in)
1941	Al Blozis	Georgetown Hoyas	16.72 m (54 ft 10 1/4 in)
1942	Al Blozis	Georgetown Hoyas	16.70 m (54 ft 9 1/4 in)
1943	Elmer Aussieker	Missouri Tigers	15.94 m (52 ft 3 1/2 in)
1944	Norman Wasser	NYU Violets	14.96 m (49 ft 3/4 in)
1945	Ed Quirk	Missouri Tigers	16.16 m (53 ft 0 in)
1946	Bernie Mayer	NYU Violets	16.11 m (52 ft 10 1/4 in)
1947	Charles Fonville	Michigan Wolverines	16.74 m (54 ft 11 in)A
1948	Charles Fonville	Michigan Wolverines	16.64 m (54 ft 7 in)
1949	Jim Fuchs	Yale Bulldogs	17.11 m (56 ft 1 1/2 in)
1950	Jim Fuchs	Yale Bulldogs	17.35 m (56 ft 11 in)
1951	Darrow Hooper	Texas A&M Aggies	16.43 m (53 ft 10 3/4 in)
1952	Parry O'Brien	USC Trojans	17.39 m (57 ft 1/2 in)
1953	Parry O'Brien	USC Trojans	17.86 m (58 ft 7 in)
1954	Tom Jones	Miami RedHawks	16.53 m (54 ft 2 3/4 in)
1955	Bill Nieder	Kansas Jayhawks	17.45 m (57 ft 3 in)
1956	Ken Bantum	Manhattan Jaspers	18.30 m (60 ft 1/4 in)
1957	Dave Owen	Michigan Wolverines	18.13 m (59 ft 5 3/4 in)
1958	Dave Davis	USC Trojans	17.84 m (58 ft 6 1/4 in)
1959	Carl Shine	Penn Quakers	17.67 m (57 ft 11 1/2 in)
1960	Dallas Long	USC Trojans	18.82 m (61 ft 8 3/4 in)
1961	Dallas Long	USC Trojans	19.29 m (63 ft 3 1/4 in)
1962	Dallas Long	USC Trojans	19.68 m (64 ft 6 3/4 in)
1963	Gary Gubner	NYU Violets	19.02 m (62 ft 4 3/4 in)A
1964	Gary Gubner	NYU Violets	18.79 m (61 ft 7 3/4 in)
1965	Neal Steinhauer	Oregon Ducks	19.05 m (62 ft 6 in)
1966	Randy Matson	Texas A&M Aggies	20.46 m (67 ft 1 1/2 in)
1967	Randy Matson	Texas A&M Aggies	20.65 m (67 ft 8 3/4 in)A
1968	Steve Marcus	UCLA Bruins	18.79 m (61 ft 7 3/4 in)
1969	Karl Salb	Kansas Jayhawks	19.73 m (64 ft 8 3/4 in)
1970	Karl Salb	Kansas Jayhawks	19.46 m (63 ft 10 in)
1971	Karl Salb	Kansas Jayhawks	20.41 m (66 ft 11 1/2 in)
1972	Fred DeBernardi	UTEP Miners	20.28 m (66 ft 6 1/4 in)
1973	Hans Höglund (SWE)	UTEP Miners	19.68 m (64 ft 6 3/4 in)
1974	Jesse Stuart	Western Kentucky Hilltoppers	20.25 m (66 ft 5 in)
1975	Hans Höglund (SWE)	UTEP Miners	21.33 m (69 ft 11 3/4 in)A
1976	Dana LeDuc	Texas Longhorns	19.95 m (65 ft 5 1/4 in)
1977	Terry Albritton	Stanford Cardinal	20.51 m (67 ft 3 1/4 in)
1978	Dave Laut	UCLA Bruins	20.15 m (66 ft 1 1/4 in)
1979	Dave Laut	UCLA Bruins	20.41 m (66 ft 11 1/2 in)
1980	Mike Carter	SMU Mustangs	20.4 m (66 ft 11 in)
1981	Mike Carter	SMU Mustangs	21.00 m (68 ft 10 3/4 in)
1982	Dean Crouser	Oregon Ducks	20.84 m (68 ft 4 1/4 in)A
1983	Mike Carter	SMU Mustangs	20.9 m (68 ft 6 3/4 in)
1984	John Brenner	UCLA Bruins	21.92 m (71 ft 10 3/4 in)
1985	John Campbell	Louisiana Tech Bulldogs	21.12 m (69 ft 3 1/4 in)
1986	Lars Arvid Nilsen (NOR)	SMU Mustangs	21.22 m (69 ft 7 1/4 in)
1987	Garry Frank	Mississippi State Bulldogs	19.89 m (65 ft 3 in)
1988	Mike Stulce	Texas A&M Aggies	18.99 m (62 ft 3 1/2 in)
1989	Mike Stulce	Texas A&M Aggies	21.02 m (68 ft 11 1/2 in)A
1990	Shane Collins	Arizona State Sun Devils	20.20 m (66 ft 3 1/4 in)
1991	Simon Williams (GBR)	LSU Tigers	18.69 m (61 ft 3 3/4 in)
1992	Brent Noon	Georgia Bulldogs	19.98 m (65 ft 6 1/2 in)
1993	Brent Noon	Georgia Bulldogs	20.41 m (66 ft 11 1/2 in)
1994	Brent Noon	Georgia Bulldogs	20.67 m (67 ft 9 3/4 in)
1995	John Godina	UCLA Bruins	22.00 m (72 ft 2 in)
1996	Andy Bloom	Wake Forest Demon Deacons	19.82 m (65 ft 1/4 in)
1997	Adam Nelson	Dartmouth Big Green	19.62 m (64 ft 4 1/4 in)
1998	Brad Snyder (CAN)	South Carolina Gamecocks	19.70 m (64 ft 7 1/2 in)
1999	Janus Robberts (RSA)	SMU Mustangs	20.10 m (65 ft 11 1/4 in)
2000	Joachim Olsen (DEN)	Idaho Vandals	20.26 m (66 ft 5 1/2 in)
2001	Janus Robberts (RSA)	SMU Mustangs	21.97 m (72 ft 3/4 in)
2002	Janus Robberts (RSA)	SMU Mustangs	21.60 m (70 ft 10 1/4 in)
2003	Carl Myerscough (GBR)	Nebraska Cornhuskers	21.92 m (71 ft 10 3/4 in)
2004	Carl Myerscough (GBR)	Nebraska Cornhuskers	20.64 m (67 ft 8 1/2 in)
2005	Edis Elkasevic (CRO)	Auburn Tigers	20.88 m (68 ft 6 in)
2006	Garrett Johnson	Florida State Seminoles	20.29 m (66 ft 6 3/4 in)
2007	Noah Bryant	USC Trojans	20.04 m (65 ft 8 3/4 in)
2008	Cory Martin	Auburn Tigers	20.35 m (66 ft 9 in)
2009	Ryan Whiting	Arizona State Sun Devils	20.11 m (65 ft 11 1/2 in)
2010	Ryan Whiting	Arizona State Sun Devils	21.97 m (72 ft 3/4 in)
2011	Jordan Clarke	Arizona State Sun Devils	19.75 m (64 ft 9 1/2 in)
2012	Jordan Clarke	Arizona State Sun Devils	20.40 m (66 ft 11 in)
2013	Ryan Crouser	Texas Longhorns	20.31 m (66 ft 7 1/2 in)
2014	Ryan Crouser	Texas Longhorns	21.12 m (69 ft 3 1/4 in)
2015	Jonathan Jones	Buffalo Bulls	20.78 m (68 ft 2 in)
2016	Filip Mihaljević (CRO)	Virginia Cavaliers	20.71 m (67 ft 11 1/4 in)
2017	Filip Mihaljevic (CRO)	Virginia Cavaliers	21.30 m (69 ft 10 1/2 in)
2018	Denzel Comenentia (NED)	Georgia Bulldogs	20.61 m (67 ft 7 1/4 in)
2019	Tripp Piperi	Texas Longhorns	21.11 m (69 ft 3 in)
2021	Turner Washington	Arizona State Sun Devils	21.10 m (69 ft 2 1/2 in)
2022	Tripp Piperi	Texas Longhorns	21.52 m (70 ft 7 in)
2023	Jordan Geist	Arizona Wildcats	21.06 m (69 ft 1 in)
2024	Tarik Robinson-O'Hagan	Ole Miss Rebels	20.88 m (68 ft 6 in)
2025	Jason Swarens	Wisconsin Badgers	21.23 m (69 ft 7 3/4 in)
2026	Ben Smith	Oregon Ducks	21.04 m (69 ft 1/4 in)
