= LeJerald Betters =

American sprinter (born 1988)

Personal information
- Nicknames: Sticks, Stixx
- Nationality: American
- Born: February 6, 1988
- Height: 190 cm (6 ft 3 in)
- Weight: 79 kg (174 lb)

Sport
- Sport: Athletics
- Event: 400 m
- College team: Baylor Bears

Achievements and titles
- National finals: 2007 NCAA indoors; 4 × 400 m, 1st (gold); 2007 NCAA; 400 m, 6th; 4 × 400 m, 1st (gold); 2008 NCAA indoors; 4 × 400 m, 1st (gold); 2008 NCAA; 400 m, 3rd (bronze); 4 × 400 m, 1st (gold); 2009 NCAA indoors; 4 × 400 m, 1st (gold)
- Personal bests: 400m: 44.70 (2010); 400m (i): 46.35 (2010)
Medal record
Men's athletics
Representing United States
NACAC U23 Championships
Gold medal – first place	2008 Toluca	400 m
Gold medal – first place	2010 Miramar	4 × 400 m
World Indoor Championships
Gold medal – first place	2010 Doha	4 × 400 m

LeJerald "Sticks" Betters (born 6 February 1988) is an American former sprinter specializing in the 400 metres. He was a five-time NCAA Division I champion in relays, and in 2010 he was a member of the gold medal-winning 4 × 400 m relay team at the World Indoor Championships.

== Biography ==
Betters attended Waco High School, where he was a 2-time state champion in the 400 metres as well as a state champion in the triple jump as a junior.

As a member of the Baylor Bears track and field team, Betters won five NCAA Division I championships in the 4 × 400 m from 2007 to 2009, as well as third-place finish in the individual 400 m in 2008. Later in 2008, Betters won his first individual international championship with a gold medal in the 400 m at the 2008 NACAC U23 Championships in Athletics, finishing in a time of 44.75.

In 2010, Betters won another NACAC U23 Championships gold in the 4 × 400 m relay, and then was selected as part of the US team for the 2010 IAAF World Indoor Championships in Doha, Qatar. Running second leg, his team won the gold medal in the finals.

== Statistics ==
=== Personal bests ===
Event	Mark	Competition	Venue	Date
400 m (outdoors)	44.70	Diamond League Lausanne	Lausanne, Switzerland	8 July 2010
400 m (indoors)	46.35A	Tyson Invitational	Fayetteville, Arkansas	28 February 2010
4 × 400 m	2:58.83	NACAC U23 Championships	Miramar, Florida	11 July 2010
