= Combined events at the NCAA Division I Indoor Track and Field Championships =

The combined track and field events – indoor heptathlon for men, and athletics pentathlon for women – have been held at the NCAA Division I Indoor Track and Field Championships annually since 2004.

== Winners ==
Key
A=Altitude assisted

Women's pentathlon winners
Year	Athlete	Team	Mark
2004	Hyleas Fountain	Georgia Bulldogs	4,412
2005	Ashley Selig	Nebraska Cornhuskers	4,327
2006	Jackie Johnson	Arizona State Sun Devils	4,287
2007	Jackie Johnson	Arizona State Sun Devils	4,393
2008	Jackie Johnson	Arizona State Sun Devils	4,496
2009	Amy Menlove	BYU Cougars	4,365
2010	Brianne Theisen	Oregon Ducks	4,396
2011	Brianne Theisen	Oregon Ducks	4,540
2012	Brianne Theisen	Oregon Ducks	4,536
2013	Erica Bougard	Mississippi State Bulldogs	4,399
2014	Kendell Williams	Georgia Bulldogs	4,635 A
2015	Kendell Williams	Georgia Bulldogs	4,678
2016	Kendell Williams	Georgia Bulldogs	4,703
2017	Kendell Williams	Georgia Bulldogs	4,682
2018	Taliyah Brooks	Arkansas Razorbacks	4,572
2019	Michelle Atherley	Miami Hurricanes	4,547
2021	Tyra Gittens	Texas A&M Aggies	4,746
2022	Anna Hall	Florida Gators	4,586
2023	Jadin O'Brien	Notre Dame Fighting Irish	4,512 A
2024	Jadin O'Brien	Notre Dame Fighting Irish	4,497
2025	Jadin O'Brien	Notre Dame Fighting Irish	4,596
2026	Liisa-Maria Lusti	Oregon Ducks	4,498

Men's heptathlon winners
Year	Athlete	Team	Mark
2004	Donovan Kilmartin	Texas Longhorns	6,136
2005	Maurice Smith	Auburn Tigers	6,004
2006	Donovan Kilmartin	Texas Longhorns	6,048
2007	Donovan Kilmartin	Texas Longhorns	5,998
2008	Gonzalo Barroilhet	Florida State Seminoles	5,951
2009	Ashton Eaton	Oregon Ducks	5,988
2010	Ashton Eaton	Oregon Ducks	6,499
2011	Miller Moss	Clemson Tigers	5,986
2012	Curtis Beach	Duke Blue Devils	6,138
2013	Kevin Lazas	Arkansas Razorbacks	6,175
2014	Curtis Beach	Duke Blue Devils	6,190 A
2015	Luca Wieland	Minnesota Golden Gophers	6,070
2016	Zach Ziemek	Wisconsin Badgers	6,173
2017	Devon Williams	Georgia Bulldogs	6,177
2018	Tim Duckworth	Kentucky Wildcats	6,188
2019	Harrison Williams	Stanford Cardinal	6,042
2021	Karel Tilga	Georgia Bulldogs	6,264
2022	Ayden Owens-Delerme	Arkansas Razorbacks	6,211
2023	Kyle Garland	Georgia Bulldogs	6,639 A
2024	Leo Neugebauer	Texas Longhorns	6,347
2025	Peyton Bair	Mississippi State Bulldogs	6,013
2026	Peyton Bair	Oregon Ducks	6,503
