= 2008 NCAA Division I Outdoor Track and Field Championships =

- Edition: 87th (Men); 27th (Women)
- Dates: June 11–14, 2008
- Host city: (Iowa) Des Moines, Iowa; Drake University
- Venue: Drake Stadium
- Events: 42

The 2008 NCAA Division I Outdoor Track and Field Championships were contested at the 87th annual NCAA-sanctioned track meet to determine the individual and team champions of men's and women's Division I collegiate outdoor track and field in the United States.

This year's meet, the 27th with both men's and women's championships, was held June 11–14, 2008 at Drake Stadium at Drake University in Des Moines, Iowa.

Florida State won the men's title, the Seminoles' second (their 2007 title was vacated by the NCAA).

LSU won the women's title, the Lady Tigers' record fourteenth title and first since 2003.

== Team results ==
- Note: Top 10 only
- (DC) = Defending champions
- Full results

=== Men's standings ===
Rank	Team	Points
1st place, gold medalist(s)	Florida State	52
2nd place, silver medalist(s)	Auburn; LSU	44
4	Texas	35
5	Texas A&M	32
6	Arizona State	28
7	Baylor; USC	27
9	Kentucky	25
10	Colorado	24

=== Women's standings ===
Rank	Team	Points
1st place, gold medalist(s)	LSU	67
2nd place, silver medalist(s)	Arizona State	63
3rd place, bronze medalist(s)	Texas A&M	48
4	Penn State	39
5	Texas Tech	32
6	Stanford	31
7	Michigan	29
8	Oregon	27
9	Florida	26
10	UTEP	25
