= 2006 NCAA Division I Indoor Track and Field Championships =

- Organisers: NCAA
- Edition: 42nd (Men); 24th (Women)
- Dates: March 10-11, 2006
- Host city: Fayetteville, Arkansas
- Venue: Randal Tyson Track Center
- Level: Division I

Day 3 broadcast

The 2006 NCAA Division I Indoor Track and Field Championships were contested to determine the individual and team national champions of men's and women's NCAA collegiate indoor track and field events in the United States after the 2004–05 season, the 42nd annual meet for men and 24th annual meet for women.

For the seventh consecutive year, the championships were held at the Randal Tyson Track Center at the University of Arkansas in Fayetteville, Arkansas.

Hosts and defending champions Arkansas won the men's title, the Razorbacks' nineteenth.

Texas won the women's title, the Longhorns' sixth and first since 1999.

== Qualification ==
All teams and athletes from Division I indoor track and field programs were eligible to compete for this year's individual and team titles.

== Team standings ==
- Note: Top 10 only
- Scoring: 6 points for a 1st-place finish in an event, 4 points for 2nd, 3 points for 3rd, 2 points for 4th, and 1 point for 5th
- (DC) = Defending Champions
- † = Participation vacated by NCAA Committee on Infractions

=== Men's title ===
- 66 teams scored at least one point

Rank	Team	Points
1st place, gold medalist(s)	Arkansas (DC)	53
2nd place, silver medalist(s)	LSU	45
3rd place, bronze medalist(s)	Florida State	41
4	Texas	35
5	Tennessee	25
6	Oregon	23
7	Wisconsin	22
8	Baylor	21
9	Florida	20
10	Arizona	18

=== Women's title ===
- 63 teams scored at least one point

Rank	Team	Points
1st place, gold medalist(s)	Texas	51
2nd place, silver medalist(s)	Stanford	36
3rd place, bronze medalist(s)	Arizona State	30
4	North Carolina	29
T5	Georgia	27
T5	Miami (FL)	27
7	LSU	25
T8	Auburn	21
T8	USC	21
10	Northern Arizona	20
10	South Carolina	20
18	Tennessee (DC)	13

== See also ==
- 2005 NCAA Division I Cross Country Championships
- 2006 NCAA Division I Outdoor Track and Field Championships
