= Jerry Bright =

American sprinter

Medal record

Men's Athletics

Representing the United States

Pan American Games
| Gold medal – first place | 1967 Winnipeg | 4×100 metres relay |

Jerry Bright (born July 21, 1947) is an American former sprinter who specialised in the 200-meter dash. He ranked in the top six of that event nationally at the USA Track and Field Championships from 1967 to 1969. He set personal bests of 20.1 seconds for that event in 1968. He also had bests of 9.4 seconds for the 100-yard dash and 10.1 seconds for the 100-meter dash. His sole international medals came at the 1967 Pan American Games, where he was a relay gold medallist with the United States and a silver medallist in the 200 m behind the leading American athlete, John Carlos. Bright was also fourth in the 100 m Pan American final.

Bright was an All-American sprinter for the Arizona State Sun Devils track and field team, placing 3rd in the 200 meters at the 1967 NCAA University Division outdoor track and field championships.
