= Rhonda Brady =

American athletics competitor

Rhonda Brady (born July 10, 1959, in Gary, Indiana) (later taking the married surname Anderson) is a former American track and field athlete. She was primarily known for running short hurdle races but was also successful as a sprinter. Shortly after finishing her junior year at Calumet High School in Gary, Indiana, she qualified to represent the United States at the 1976 Olympics in the 100 meters hurdles. She was unable to get out of her qualifying heat that included the eventual gold and bronze medalists. She was the youngest to qualify for that team at the 1976 Olympic Trials where she won her race against more experienced competitors.

The following year she won the Indiana State High School Championship in the 100 meters. She was the three time United States Junior Champion in the hurdles. She still ranks on the Indiana state 100 meters list, with Maicel Malone and Candyce McGrone ahead of her on that list.

Following high school she joined Ed Temple's program at Tennessee State University. She also ran in the AIAW for the Arizona State Sun Devils track and field team. She was ranked in the American top ten in 1976 to 1978 and managed to return to the top 10 in 1985. She returned to the Olympic Trials 1984 and 1988.

When not competing for her high school or collegiate team, she competed for the Mayor Hatcher Youth Foundation, named for Gary Mayor Richard G. Hatcher, in the same form as the Mayor Daley Youth Foundation named for Richard J. Daley the recently deceased mayor from neighboring Chicago.

She eventually went into coaching for Lew Wallace High School, Roosevelt High School and currently Wheeler High School.
