= 2009 NCAA Division I Outdoor Track and Field Championships =

- Edition: 88th (Men); 28th (Women)
- Dates: June 10–13, 2009
- Host city: Fayetteville, Arkansas; University of Arkansas
- Venue: John McDonnell Field

The 2009 NCAA Division I Outdoor Track and Field Championships were contested at the 88th annual NCAA-sanctioned track meet to determine the individual and team champions of men's and women's Division I collegiate outdoor track and field in the United States.

This year's meet, the 28th with both men's and women's championships, was held June 10–13, 2009 at John McDonnell Field at the University of Arkansas in Fayetteville, Arkansas.

Texas A&M won both the men's and women's titles, the Aggies' first at either event.

== Team results ==
- Note: Top 10 only
- (DC) = Defending champions
- Full results

=== Men's standings ===
Rank	Team	Points
1st place, gold medalist(s)	Texas A&M	48
2nd place, silver medalist(s)	Florida; Florida State; Oregon	46
5	LSU	37
6	South Carolina	33.5
7	Stanford	30
8	Arizona State	29
9	Arkansas	27
10	USC	26

=== Women's standings ===
Rank	Team	Points
1st place, gold medalist(s)	Texas A&M	50
2nd place, silver medalist(s)	Oregon	43
3rd place, bronze medalist(s)	Arizona State	41
4	Florida State	40
5	Texas	36
6	LSU	29.5
7	Michigan	28
8	USC	24
9	Florida	23
10	Baylor; Tennessee	21
