= Tracy Mattes =

American track and field athlete

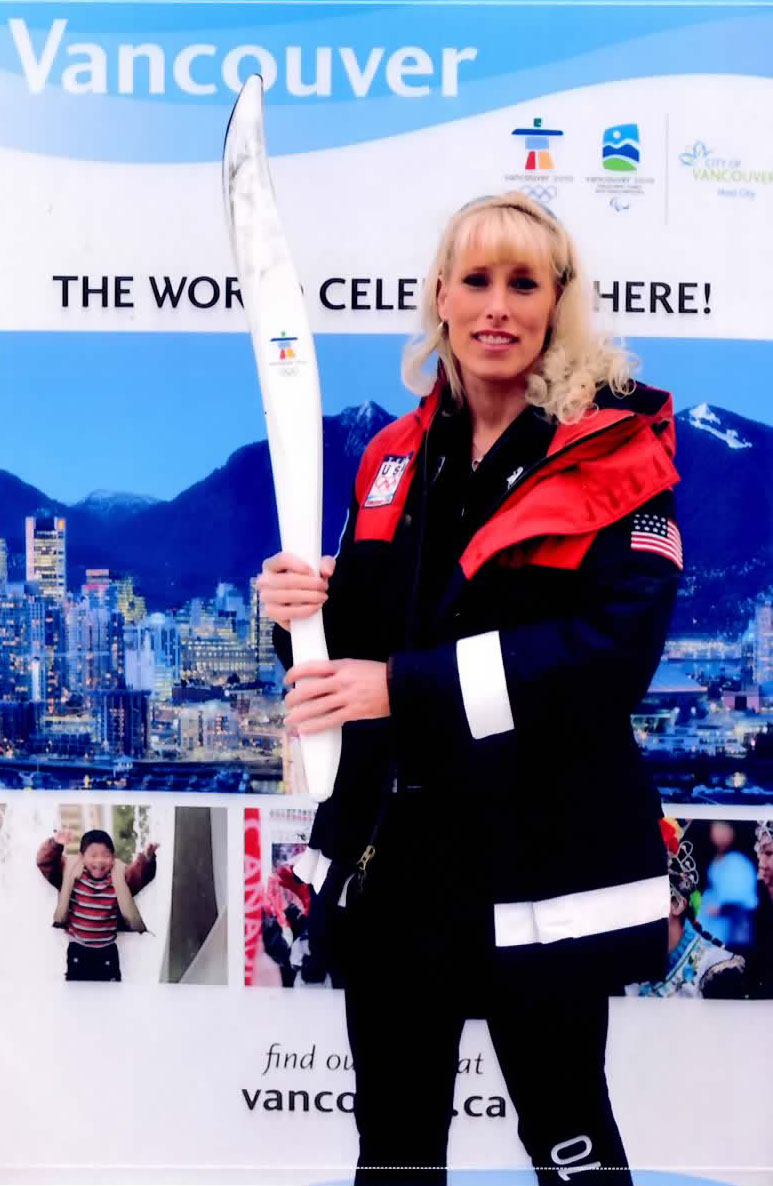
- Mattes in 2010

Personal information
- Full name: Tracy Mattes
- Nationality: American
- Born: December 13, 1969 (age 56) Milwaukee, Wisconsin, U.S.

Sport
- Country: United States
- Sport: Track and field athletics
- Club: Arizona State University University of Wisconsin
- Team: USA Track & Field

Tracy Mattes (born December 13, 1969, in Milwaukee, Wisconsin) is a retired American track and field athlete and humanitarian activist.

In 2009 Tracy was inducted into the World Sports Humanitarian Hall of Fame, joining an elite fraternity of past inductees such as Tennis great Arthur Ashe, Olympian Jesse Owens, Gymnast Mary Lou Retton, Major League Baseball pioneer Jackie Robinson, soccer great Pelé and the Harlem Globetrotters. Chaired by George H. W. Bush, 41st President of the United States, the Hall of Fame recognizes individuals from amateur and professional sports who distinguish themselves with their humanitarian efforts.

Tracy specialized in the 400 meters hurdles and also competed in the modern pentathlon for a short period of time. She was an All-American for the Arizona State Sun Devils track and field team, finishing 4th in the 400 m hurdles at the 1992 NCAA Division I Outdoor Track and Field Championships. She served for 7 years as a UN Special Representative focusing on building small libraries in Africa, and held the position of Director of Global Programs for the World Olympians Association under the Presidency of Olympic Gold Medalist Dick Fosbury. Tracy is currently the Executive Director for the American Water Ski Educational Foundation, the headquarters of the Water Ski Hall of Fame and Museum and USA Water Ski.
