= Bill Miller (javelin thrower) =

American javelin thrower (1930–2016)

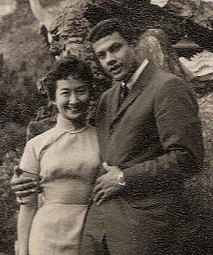
- Bill Miller and his wife Thiang Long (Linda) – 1959

Personal information
- Full name: William Preston Miller
- Born: February 22, 1930 Lawnside, New Jersey, U.S.
- Died: October 27, 2016 (aged 86) Apache Junction, Arizona, U.S.
Medal record
Men's athletics
Representing United States
Olympic Games
Silver medal – second place	1952 Helsinki	Javelin throw

William Preston Miller (February 22, 1930 – October 27, 2016) was an American athlete who competed in the javelin throw for the United States in the 1952 Summer Olympics held in Helsinki, Finland where he won the silver medal with a throw of 72.46 meters. Miller was born in Lawnside, New Jersey.

== AAU competition ==
A graduate of Haddon Heights High School, he won the American Athletic Union competition in 1952 and 1954. He was an African-American and Native American athlete and one of the few Native Americans who have represented America at the Olympics.

== College studies ==
He completed his bachelor's degree and Masters studies in psychology at Arizona State University and had an additional year of graduate studies at the University of Pennsylvania in International Affairs. Representing the Arizona State Sun Devils track and field team at the NCAA Championships, he was 5th in the 1949 javelin throw, and 3rd in 1950.

== Denied world record ==
In 1954, he was denied the opportunity to become the only native athlete ever to hold the world javelin record. He completed a throw of 266 ft 8 1/2 in (81.293 m) but the javelin had been broken and in repairing the implement the center of gravity had been moved out of the specified limits.

== Decathlon and 1970 Masters Nationals ==
His accomplishments as an athlete, included not only javelin records, but achievements as well in the Decathlon, competing in both the Javelin and High Jump. He competed as an American Decathlon athlete in 1952. In July, 1970 Miller returned to competing and placed second in the Javelin at the 1970 Masters National Outdoor Track and Field Championship.

== Later career ==
He worked for the U.S. State Department as the U.S. Liaison and head coach for the National Indonesian Track and Field Coach, then after, as the head coach of the National Malaysian Track and Field Team. In 1967, he brought his family back to the U.S. and took a job with the U.S. Office of Economic Security in Washington D.C. He later worked for the Bureau of Indian Affairs (BIA) in Washington, then completed his career in Arizona working with Native American desert crops, Jojoba and Guayule.

He died Thursday, Oct. 27th, 2016 at his home, Ironwood Assisted Living in Apache Junction, Arizona.
