= Gea Johnson =

American bobsledder

Personal information
- Born: September 18, 1967 (age 58) Monticello, Utah, United States

Sport
- Sport: Bobsleigh

Gea Johnson (born September 18, 1967) is a retired American heptathlete turned bobsledder. She competed in the two woman event at the 2002 Winter Olympics.

Competing for the Arizona State Sun Devils track and field team, Johnson won the 1990 NCAA Division I Outdoor Track and Field Championships in the heptathlon.
