= Ivan Jean-Marie =

Saint Lucian athletics competitor

Ivan Jean-Marie (born 28 September 1972) is a retired athlete from Saint Lucia.

Jean-Marie was part of the first ever team to represent Saint Lucia at the Olympic Games when he competed at the 1996 Summer Olympic Games in the 400 metres and the 4 x 100 metres relay. He finished seventh in his heat in the 400 metres and the relay team finished fifth in their heat so he did not advance to the next round in either event.

He still holds Saint Lucian junior records for the 200 metres and 400 metres which he set in 1991, and the senior record in the 400 metres, set in 1995.

Jean-Marie was an All-American sprinter for the Arizona State Sun Devils track and field team, anchoring their 4 × 400 meters relay team to a 6th-place finish at the 1995 NCAA Division I Outdoor Track and Field Championships.

== See also ==
- Saint Lucian records in athletics
