= 2006 NCAA Division I Outdoor Track and Field Championships =

- Men's Champion: Florida State (1st title); Women's Champion: Auburn (1st title)
- Edition: 85th (Men); 25th (Women)
- Dates: June 7–10, 2006
- Host city: (California) Sacramento, California; Sacramento State University
- Venue: Hornet Stadium

Final day broadcast

The 2006 NCAA Division I Outdoor Track and Field Championships were contested at the 85th annual NCAA-sanctioned track meet to determine the individual and team champions of men's and women's Division I collegiate outdoor track and field in the United States.

This year's meet, the 25th with both men's and women's championships, was held June 7–10, 2006 at Hornet Stadium at Sacramento State University in Sacramento, California.

Florida State won the men's title, the Seminoles' first.

Auburn won the women's title, the Tigers' first.

== Team results ==
- Note: Top 10 only
- (DC) = Defending champions
- Full results

=== Men's standings ===
Rank	Team	Points
1st place, gold medalist(s)	Florida State	67
2nd place, silver medalist(s)	LSU	51
3rd place, bronze medalist(s)	Texas	36
4	Arizona	34
5	Arkansas	33
6	Tennessee	32
7	UTEP	31
8	Wisconsin	30
9	BYU; North Carolina; USC	26

=== Women's standings ===
Rank	Team	Points
1st place, gold medalist(s)	Auburn	57
2nd place, silver medalist(s)	USC	38.5
3rd place, bronze medalist(s)	South Carolina	38
4	Arizona State; Nebraska	37
6	Texas (DC)	36
7	LSU; Miami (FL)	30
9	Georgia	25.75
10	Texas A&M	24
