= 2007 NCAA Division I Outdoor Track and Field Championships =

- Edition: 86th (Men); 26th (Women)
- Dates: June 6–9, 2007
- Host city: Sacramento, California; California State University, Sacramento
- Venue: Hornet Stadium
- Events: 36

The 2007 NCAA Division I Outdoor Track and Field Championships were the 66th NCAA Men's Division I Outdoor Track and Field Championships and the 26th NCAA Women's Division I Outdoor Track and Field Championships at Hornet Stadium in Sacramento, California on the campus of the California State University, Sacramento. In total, thirty-six different men's and women's track and field events were contested.

== Results ==
=== Men's events ===
==== 100 meters ====
- Final results shown, not prelims

Rank	Name	University	Time	Notes
1st place, gold medalist(s)	Walter Dix	Florida St.	9.93	
2nd place, silver medalist(s)	Trindon Holliday	LSU	10.06	
3rd place, bronze medalist(s)	Travis Padgett	Clemson	10.09	
4	Michael LeBlanc Canada	Syracuse	10.22	
5	Richard Thompson Trinidad and Tobago	LSU	10.24	
6	Michael Ray Garvin	Florida St.	10.30	
7	Greg Bolden	Florida St.	10.30	
8	Orlando Reid	Middle Tenn	10.32	

==== 200 meters ====
Rank	Name	University	Time	Notes
1st place, gold medalist(s)	Walter Dix	Florida St.	20.32	
2nd place, silver medalist(s)	Rubin Williams	Tennessee	20.72	
3rd place, bronze medalist(s)	Orlando Reid	Middle Tenn	20.75	
4	Brent Gray	Long Beach State	20.96	
5	Evander Wells	Tennessee	21.03	
6	Reggie Witherspoon	Baylor	21.03	
7	Scott Wims	Nebraska	21.05	
8	Ahmad Rashad	USC	23.97	

==== 400 meters ====
Rank	Name	University	Time	Notes
1st place, gold medalist(s)	Ricardo Chambers Jamaica	Florida St.	44.66	
2nd place, silver medalist(s)	Lionel Larry	USC	44.68	
3rd place, bronze medalist(s)	Erison Hurtault Dominica	Columbia	45.40	
4	Lesiba Masheto Botswana	Illinois	45.51	
5	Michael Bingham United Kingdom	Wake Forest	45.57	
6	LeJerald Betters	Baylor	45.66	
7	Calvin Smith	Florida	45.74	
8	Siraj Williams Liberia	LSU	45.77	

==== 800 meters ====
Rank	Name	University	Time	Notes
1st place, gold medalist(s)	Andrew Ellerton Canada	Michigan	1:47.48	
2nd place, silver medalist(s)	Elias Koech Kenya	UTEP	1:47.70	
3rd place, bronze medalist(s)	Ryan Brown	Washington	1:47.77	
4	Golden Coachman	Mississippi St.	1:47.96	
5	Tim Bayley United Kingdom	Iona	1:48.04	
6	Shaun Smith Jamaica	Oral Roberts	1:48.09	
7	Duane Solomon	USC	1:48.53	
8	Larry Brooks	UTSA	1:53.77	

==== 1500 meters ====
Rank	Name	University	Time	Notes
1st place, gold medalist(s)	Lopez Lomong	Northern Arizona	3:37.07	
2nd place, silver medalist(s)	Leonel Manzano	Texas	3:37.48	
3rd place, bronze medalist(s)	Russell Brown	Stanford	3:37.56	
4	Vincent Rono Kenya	South Alabama	3:37.96	
5	Kurt Benninger	Notre Dame	3:39.80	
6	Max Smith	Providence	3:39.93	
7	Garrett Heath	Stanford	3:40.14	
8	Ben True	Dartmouth	3:40.17	

==== 3000 meters steeplechase ====
Rank	Name	University	Time	Notes
1st place, gold medalist(s)	Barnabas Kirui Kenya	Mississippi	8:20.36	
2nd place, silver medalist(s)	Andrew Lemoncello United Kingdom	Florida State	8:27.29	
3rd place, bronze medalist(s)	Aaron Aguayo	Arizona State	8:32.40	
4	Billy Nelson	Colorado	8:33.33	
5	Corey Nowitzke	Eastern Michigan	8:34.42	
6	Jan Foerster Germany	Virginia	8:34.78	
7	Kyle Alcorn	Arizona State	8:35.71	
8	Luke Gunn United Kingdom	Florida State	8:37.30	

==== 5000 meters ====
Rank	Name	University	Time	Notes
1st place, gold medalist(s)	Chris Solinsky	Wisconsin	13:35.12	
2nd place, silver medalist(s)	Bobby Curtis	Villanova	13:39.88	
3rd place, bronze medalist(s)	Wesley Korir Kenya	Louisville	13:40.47	
4	Josh McDougal	Liberty	13:41.03	
5	Tonny Okello Uganda	South Alabama	13:41.08	
6	Obed Mutanya Zambia	Arizona	13:42.81	
7	Forest Braden	Boise State	13:54.73	
8	David Nightingale	Princeton	13:55.15	

==== 10,000 meters ====
Rank	Name	University	Time	Notes
1st place, gold medalist(s)	Shadrack Songok Kenya	Texas A&M-Corpus Christi	28:55.83	
2nd place, silver medalist(s)	Galen Rupp	Oregon	28:56.19	
3rd place, bronze medalist(s)	Josh McDougal	Liberty	28:58.28	
4	Sean Quigley	La Salle	28:59.29	
5	Tim Nelson	Wisconsin	29:00.75	
6	Stephen Samoei Kenya	UTEP	29:08.30	
7	Jeremy Johnson	New Mexico	29:09.01	
8	Josh Rohatinsky	BYU	29:12.64	

==== 110 meters hurdles ====
- Final results shown, not prelims

Rank	Name	University	Time	Notes
1st place, gold medalist(s)	Tyron Akins	Auburn	13.42	
2nd place, silver medalist(s)	John Yarbrough	Mississippi	13.57	
3rd place, bronze medalist(s)	Alleyne Lett Grenada	LSU	13.57	
4	Jeff Porter	Michigan	13.67	
5	Marlon Odom	Texas Tech	13.77	
6	Thomas Hilliard	South Carolina	13.83	
7	Kai Kelley	USC	13.86	
8	Julius Jiles	Kansas	13.95	

==== 400 meters hurdles ====
Rank	Name	University	Time	Notes
1st place, gold medalist(s)	Isa Phillips Jamaica	LSU	48.51	
2nd place, silver medalist(s)	Brandon Johnson	UCLA	49.02	
3rd place, bronze medalist(s)	Justin Gaymon	Georgia	49.43	
4	Joe Greene	Albany (NY)	49.92	
5	Thomas Hilliard	South Carolina	49.93	
6	Andrew Peresta	Hampton	50.85	
7	Bryan Scott	Texas Tech	51.01	
8	Hamza Deyaf Libya	Texas	51.24	

==== 4x100-meter relay ====
- Final results shown, not prelims

Rank	School	Competitors	Time	Notes
1st place, gold medalist(s)	Florida State	Leg 1: Greg Bolden; Leg 2: Walter Dix; Leg 3: Michael Ray Garvin; Leg 4: Charles Clark	38.60	
2nd place, silver medalist(s)	LSU		38.85	
3rd place, bronze medalist(s)	Tennessee		38.86	
4	Oklahoma		39.43	
5	Middle Tennessee		39.78	
6	Colorado		39.98	
7	Clemson		40.07	
8	Arizona		40.13	

==== 4x400-meter relay ====
- Final results shown, not prelims

Rank	School	Competitors	Time	Notes
1st place, gold medalist(s)	Baylor	Leg 1: Reggie Witherspoon; Leg 2: LeJerald Betters; Leg 3: Kevin Mutai; Leg 4: Quentin Summers	3:00.04	
2nd place, silver medalist(s)	Texas A&M		3:01.07	
3rd place, bronze medalist(s)	LSU		3:02.97	
4	Mississippi State		3:03.49	
5	Georgia		3:04.13	
6	UNI		3:04.78	
7	South Carolina		3:05.03	
8	Florida		3:06.04	

==== High Jump ====
- Only top eight final results shown; no prelims are listed

Rank	Name	University	Height	Notes
1st place, gold medalist(s)	Scott Sellers	Kansas State	2.32 m (7 ft 7 1/4 in)	
2nd place, silver medalist(s)	Andra Manson	Texas	2.29 m (7 ft 6 in)	
3rd place, bronze medalist(s)	Donald Thomas Bahamas	Auburn	2.29 m (7 ft 6 in)	
4	Kyle Lancaster	Kansas State	2.23 m (7 ft 3 3/4 in)	
5	Will Littleton	Texas-Pan American	2.23 m (7 ft 3 3/4 in)	
6 (tie)	Ed Wright	California	2.20 m (7 ft 2 1/2 in)	
6 (tie)	Dusty Jonas	Nebraska	2.20 m (7 ft 2 1/2 in)	
8	Ivan Diggs	Houston	2.20 m (7 ft 2 1/2 in)	

==== Pole Vault ====
- Only top eight final results shown; no prelims are listed

Rank	Name	University	Height	Notes
1st place, gold medalist(s)	Tommy Skipper	Oregon	5.50 m (18 ft 1/2 in)	
2nd place, silver medalist(s)	Chip Heuser	Oklahoma	5.45 m (17 ft 10 1/2 in)	
3rd place, bronze medalist(s)	Mike Landers	UCLA	5.45 m (17 ft 10 1/2 in)	
4 (tie)	Graeme Hoste	Stanford	5.35 m (17 ft 6 1/2 in)	
4 (tie)	Mitch Greeley Switzerland	Clemson	5.35 m (17 ft 6 1/2 in)	
4 (tie)	Rory Quiller	Binghamton	5.35 m (17 ft 6 1/2 in)	
7	Michael Hogue	Tennessee	5.35 m (17 ft 6 1/2 in)	
8	Scott Roth	Washington	5.35 m (17 ft 6 1/2 in)	

==== Long Jump ====
- Only top eight final results shown; no prelims are listed

Rank	Name	University	Height	Notes
1st place, gold medalist(s)	Dashalle Andrews	CSUN	7.68 m (25 ft 2 1/4 in)	-1.6 (7.62m -1.2)
2nd place, silver medalist(s)	Tone Belt	Louisville	7.68 m (25 ft 2 1/4 in)	-0.9 (NM)
3rd place, bronze medalist(s)	Norris Frederick	Washington	7.63 m (25 ft 1/4 in)	
4	Eric Babb	Kansas	7.58 m (24 ft 10 1/4 in)	
5	Barrett Saunders	Kansas	7.49 m (24 ft 6 3/4 in)	
6	Juan Walker	Middle Tennessee	7.49 m (24 ft 6 3/4 in)	
7	Jeremy Hicks	LSU	7.39 m (24 ft 2 3/4 in)	
8	Dermillo Wise	Oklahoma	7.38 m (24 ft 2 1/2 in)	

==== Triple Jump ====
- Only top eight final results shown; no prelims are listed

Rank	Name	University	Height	Notes
1st place, gold medalist(s)	Ray Taylor	Cornell	16.37 m (53 ft 8 1/4 in)w	
2nd place, silver medalist(s)	Andre Black	Louisville	16.15 m (52 ft 11 3/4 in)	
3rd place, bronze medalist(s)	Jonathan Jackson	TCU	16.09 m (52 ft 9 1/4 in)	
4	James Jenkins	Arkansas State	16.06 m (52 ft 8 1/4 in)	
5	Zuheir Sharif	Texas A&M	16.06 m (52 ft 8 1/4 in)	
6	Nkosinza Balumbu	Arkansas	15.99 m (52 ft 5 1/2 in)	
7	Carjay Lyles	Tennessee	15.97 m (52 ft 4 1/2 in)	
8	Muhammad Halim United States Virgin Islands	Cornell	15.97 m (52 ft 4 1/2 in)	

==== Shot Put ====
- Only top eight final results shown; no prelims are listed

Rank	Name	University	Height	Notes
1st place, gold medalist(s)	Noah Bryant	USC	20.04 m (65 ft 8 3/4 in)	
2nd place, silver medalist(s)	Mitchell Pope	North Carolina State	19.75 m (64 ft 9 1/2 in)	
3rd place, bronze medalist(s)	Milan Jotanovic Serbia	Manhattan College	19.65 m (64 ft 5 1/2 in)	
4	Ryan Whiting	Arizona State	19.44 m (63 ft 9 1/4 in)	
5	Kevin Bookout	Oklahoma	19.14 m (62 ft 9 1/2 in)	
6	Justin Clickett	Virginia Tech	19.11 m (62 ft 8 1/4 in)	
7	Cory Martin	Auburn	19.08 m (62 ft 7 in)	
8	Kimani Kirton Jamaica	Maryland Eastern Shore	18.88 m (61 ft 11 1/4 in)	

==== Discus ====
- Only top eight final results shown; no prelims are listed

Rank	Name	University	Height	Notes
1st place, gold medalist(s)	Niklas Arrhenius Sweden	BYU	62.84 m (206 ft 2 in)	
2nd place, silver medalist(s)	Michael Robertson	Stanford	62.08 m (203 ft 8 in)	
3rd place, bronze medalist(s)	Wes Stockbarger	Manhattan College	60.81 m (199 ft 6 in)	
4	Greg Garza	UCLA	60.77 m (199 ft 4 in)	
5	Adam Kuehl	Arizona	60.66 m (199 ft 0 in)	
6	Matt Lamb	Washington State	59.88 m (196 ft 5 in)	
7	Yemi Ayeni	Virginia	59.67 m (195 ft 9 in)	
8	Jason Schutz	Colorado State	58.34 m (191 ft 4 in)	

==== Hammer Throw ====
- Only top eight final results shown; no prelims are listed

Rank	Name	University	Height	Notes
1st place, gold medalist(s)	Jake Dunkleberger	Auburn	71.87 m (235 ft 9 in)	
2nd place, silver medalist(s)	Nick Owens	North Carolina	71.20 m (233 ft 7 in)	
3rd place, bronze medalist(s)	Cory Martin	Auburn	70.48 m (231 ft 2 in)	
4	Egor Agafonov Russia	Kansas	69.85 m (229 ft 2 in)	
5	Adam Midles	USC	68.58 m (225 ft 0 in)	
6	Martin Bingisser Switzerland	Washington	67.70 m (222 ft 1 in)	
7	Eugene Bradley	UCSB	65.08 m (213 ft 6 in)	
8	Nate Rolfe	Georgia	64.92 m (212 ft 11 in)	

==== Javelin Throw ====
- Only top eight final results shown; no prelims are listed

Rank	Name	University	Height	Notes
1st place, gold medalist(s)	Justin Ryncavage	North Carolina	73.58 m (241 ft 4 in)	
2nd place, silver medalist(s)	Adam Montague	North Carolina	71.96 m (236 ft 1 in)	
3rd place, bronze medalist(s)	Aris Borjas	Cal Poly	71.44 m (234 ft 4 in)	
4	Cody Fillinich	Northwestern State	70.24 m (230 ft 5 in)	
5	Chris Hill	McNeese State	69.90 m (229 ft 3 in)	
6	Chad Radgowski	LSU	68.85 m (225 ft 10 in)	
7	Ryan Brandel	Oregon	68.85 m (225 ft 10 in)	
8	Marc Pallozzi	Albany	68.40 m (224 ft 4 in)	
