= Frank Covelli =

American javelin thrower (1936–2002)

Personal information
- Nationality: American
- Born: April 2, 1936 Paducah, Kentucky, U.S.
- Died: October 25, 2002 (aged 66)

Sport
- Sport: Athletics
- Event: Javelin throw
- College team: Arizona State Sun Devils
- Club: Pacific Coast Club
Medal record
Men's Athletics
Representing the United States
Pan American Games
Gold medal – first place	1967 Winnipeg	Javelin Throw

Frank George Covelli (2 April 1936 – 25 October 2002) was an American javelin thrower who competed in the 1964 Summer Olympics and in the 1968 Summer Olympics. He was the 1964 and 1968 American champion. Throwing for Arizona State University, he was the 1963 NCAA Champion. Later, he threw for the Pacific Coast Club from Long Beach, California.

Covelli died on 25 October 2002, at the age of 66.
