= Maurice Peoples =

American sprinter

Personal information
- Nationality: American
- Born: December 17, 1950 (age 75) Jamaica, New York, U.S.
- Height: 187 cm (6 ft 2 in)
- Weight: 80 kg (176 lb)

Sport
- Sport: Athletics
- Event: 400 m
- Club: DC Strider
Medal record
Men's Athletics
Representing the United States
Pan American Games
Gold medal – first place	1975 Mexico City	4 × 400 metres
Gold medal – first place	1979 San Juan	4 × 400 metres

Maurice Peoples (born December 17, 1950) is an American former sprinter.

== Biography ==
He was two-time American champion in the 400 metres.

He also had the dubious distinction of being selected to the 1972 United States Olympic Team as one of the six members of the 4 × 400 metres relay team, but never getting onto the track as three of his teammates were unable to compete: gold and silver medalists Vince Matthews and Wayne Collett were sent home by a sensitive International Olympic Committee after they appeared inattentive at the medal ceremony, while John Smith had pulled his hamstring while leading 80 meters into the 400 metres final and had been ruled unfit to run.

Peoples went to G. A. R. Memorial Junior Senior High School in Wilkes-Barre, Pennsylvania, where he was the 1968 and 1969 state champion in the Triple jump, coached by longtime coach Vince Wojnar. Peoples next went to Arizona State University where he is still ranked second in the 400 m on their all-time list, behind 1968 Olympian Ron Freeman.

Peoples won the British AAA Championships title in the 400 metres event at the 1978 AAA Championships.

Peoples is an ordained minister and coached for 35 years. He is one of the authors of Sprint Secrets
