= Jasmine Chaney =

American hurdler (born 1988)

Personal information
- Born: August 25, 1988 (age 37) Houston, Texas, U.S.
- Height: 5 ft 3 in (160 cm)

Sport
- Country: United States
- Sport: Athletics
- Event: 400 m hurdles
- Coached by: Kendrick McDaniel
- Retired: 2020

Achievements and titles
- World finals: 2011 Daegu; 400 m hurdles
- Personal best: 400 m hurdles: 55.22 (Eugene, Oregon 2011)
Medal record
Women's athletics
Representing the United States
World Championships
2011 Daegu	400 m hurdles

Jasmine Hyder (née Chaney; born August 25, 1988) is an American retired hurdler who specialized in the 400-meter hurdles, an event in which she was the 2011 world championship semi-finalist after winning the 2011 Pacific 10 Conference 400 m hurdles title. Jasmine Hyder is an Entrepreneur.

== Achievements ==
Representing the United States
Year	Competition	Venue	Position	Event	Time
2011	World Championships	Daegu, South Korea	16th	400 m hurdles	55.97

== NCAA ==
Jasmine Chaney is an NCAA Division I All-American and highlighted by her 2011 NCAA Division I Outdoor Track and Field Championships 4th-place finish as an Arizona State Sun Devils.

== Prep ==
Cheney is a 2006 McClintock High School (Tempe, Arizona) alumnus.Cheney won AIA state titles as a senior in the 100m hurdles, 300m hurdles and 200 meters.
