= Gamali Felix =

Grenadian athlete

Personal information
- Nationality: Grenadian
- Born: 17 March 1999 (age 27) St. George's, Grenada

Sport
- Country: Grenada
- Sport: Athletics
- Event(s): 400m Long Jump; Triple Jump
- Club: South City Rising Stars

Achievements and titles
- Personal best(s): 400m 45.12; Long Jump: 7.26m, Triple Jump 14.91m
Medal record
Men's athletics
Representing Grenada
CARIFTA Games(U18)
Silver medal – second place	2016 St. George's	Triple Jump

Gamali Felix (born 17 March 1999) is a Grenadian athlete who competes primarily in the Sprints (formerly in Long Jump and Triple Jump). While attending the Grenada Boys Secondary School he became the under 16 boys Record holder in the Long Jump as well as the under 18 boys Record holder in the Triple Jump. He secured a Silver medal representing Grenada at the 2016 Carifta games with a jump of 14.55m.

In 2017 Felix was able to set a new school record in the senior boys 400m with a time of 49.44s thus erasing the old mark of 50.30s set by Anthony Modeste in 1993. This was Felix's first year competing in the event. At the National Junior Championships of the same year Felix extended his personal best distance in the Triple Jump with a jump of 14.87m.

In 2021 Felix became the NJCAA National Indoor Champion in the men's 400m. He was the first Grenadian athlete to win this title. He also earned All-American honors as part of the Barton County Community 4 × 400 m team which finish third at the outdoor Championships.

He represented Grenada at the 2021 Junior Pan American Games and placed fourth in the Men's 400m.

== Competition record ==
All information taken from World Athletics profile.

Year	Competition	Venue	Position	Event	Notes
Representing Grenada
2016	Carifta Games	St. George's, Grenada	13th	Long Jump	6.29m
2016	Carifta Games	St. George's, Grenada	2nd	Triple Jump	14.55m
2017	Carifta Games	Willemstad, Curacao	5th	Long Jump	7.10m
2017	Carifta Games	Willemstad, Curacao	5th	Triple Jump	14.61m
2021	Junior Pan American Games	Cali, Colombia	4th	400m	46.54
2023	Central American and Caribbean Games	San Salvador, El Salvador	6th	400 m	45.71
