= Shane Collins (American football) =

American football player (born 1969)

No. 91
- Position: Defensive end

Personal information
- Born: April 11, 1969 (age 57); Roundup, Montana, U.S.
- Listed height: 6 ft 3 in (1.91 m)
- Listed weight: 267 lb (121 kg)

Career information
- High school: Bozeman (Bozeman, Montana)
- College: Arizona State
- NFL draft: 1992: 2nd round, 47th overall pick

Career history
- Washington Redskins (1992–1994); San Francisco 49ers (1995)*
- * Offseason or practice squad member only

Awards and highlights
- First-team All-Pac-10 (1991)

Career NFL statistics
- Tackles: 47
- Fumble recoveries: 1
- Sacks: 1
- Stats at Pro Football Reference

Shane William Collins (born April 11, 1969) is an American former professional football player who was a defensive end for the Washington Redskins of the National Football League (NFL). He played college football for the Arizona State Sun Devils and was selected in the second round of the 1992 NFL draft. He graduated from Bozeman High School in Bozeman. While at Arizona State University, he was the NCAA shot put national champion in 1990.

Pre-draft measurables
Height	Weight	Arm length	Hand span	40-yard dash	10-yard split	20-yard split	20-yard shuttle	Vertical jump	Broad jump	Bench press
6 ft 2 7/8 in (1.90 m)	269 lb (122 kg)	32 3/4 in (0.83 m)	9 3/4 in (0.25 m)	4.87 s	1.71 s	2.80 s	4.38 s	34.5 in (0.88 m)	9 ft 5 in (2.87 m)	25 reps
All values from NFL Combine
