= Marcus Brunson =

American sprinter (born 1978)

Personal information
- Nationality: United States
- Born: April 24, 1978 (age 48) Mesa, Arizona
- Height: 6 ft 2 in (1.88 m)
- Weight: 185 lb (84 kg)

Sport
- Sport: Running
- Event: Sprints
- College team: Arizona State Sun Devils
Medal record
Men's athletics
Representing the United States
Summer Universiade
Gold medal – first place	2001 Beijing	100 m
- Updated on May 8, 2012

Marcus Brunson (born April 24, 1978) is a retired American sprinter who specialized in the 100 metres.

He went to Marcos de Niza high school in Arizona.

Brunson was inducted into the Arizona State University Hall of Fame in 2012.

== Achievements ==
Year	Competition	Venue	Position	Notes
Representing the United States
2001	Universiade	Beijing, China	1st	100 m
2004	World Athletics Final	Monte Carlo, Monaco	8th	100 m
2006	World Athletics Final	Stuttgart, Germany	5th	100 m

=== Personal bests ===
- 60 metres – 6.46 s (indoor, 1999)
- 100 metres – 9.99 s (2006)
- 200 metres – 20.37 s (2001)
