= Turner Washington =

American discus thrower

Personal information
- Born: February 10, 1999 (age 27)
- Height: 6 ft 5 in (196 cm)
- Weight: 250 lb (110 kg)

Sport
- Country: United States
- Sport: Athletics
- Events: Discus, shot put
- College team: Arizona State Sun Devils

Turner Washington (born February 10, 1999) is an American shot put and discus thrower. He is the son of Olympian Anthony Washington.

== Career ==
Washington attended Canyon del Oro High School. Washington competes for Arizona State University in both discus and shot put, becoming the 2021 NCAA Indoor and Outdoor champion in the latter.

Competing at the 2023 USA Outdoor Track and Field Championships, in Eugene, Oregon, he finished second in the men's discus competition. He was selected for the 2023 World Athletics Championships in Budapest in August 2023.

== Personal life ==
His father Anthony competed in three consecutive Summer Olympics, and the 1999 World Championships in Seville, where he won the gold medal in the discus.
