= Kyle Alcorn =

American track and field athlete

Kyle Scott Alcorn (born March 18, 1985) is an American track and field athlete. As a long-distance runner, Alcorn experienced most of his professional success in the steeplechase, an event in which he represented the United States at the 2012 Olympics in London, England.

As a prep, Alcorn ran for Buchanan High School in Clovis, California. He won the 3200 meters at the CIF California State Meet as a junior in 2001, but placed second to Tim Nelson in the same event the next year as a senior despite improving his time by seven seconds.

Alcorn went on to run at the collegiate level for the University of Oregon where he helped the cross country team win the PAC-10 championship in 2003. On the track, he became the US junior champion in the steeplechase in 2004, which in turn led to a 16th-place finish at the 2004 World Junior Championships in Athletics. Despite his success, Alcorn transferred to Arizona State University for his remaining years of NCAA eligibility, during which he won the 2008 NCAA Men's Outdoor Track and Field Championship in the steeplechase, as well as the 2008 NCAA Men's Indoor Track and Field title for the 3000 meters. In that same year, he qualified for the 2008 US Olympic Trials in the steeplechase but failed to qualify for the Olympics with an 11th-place finish.

After turning professional, Alcorn received sponsorship from Nike and was coached by Louie Quintana. He finished third at the 2009 USA Outdoor Track and Field Championships and represented the US in that year's World Championships; but failed to advance out of the qualifying heats. In 2012, Alcorn qualified for the 2012 Olympics by placing third in the United States Olympic Trials and achieving the Olympic A standard time.
