= Jordan Clarke (shot putter) =

American track and field athlete (born 1990)

Personal information
- Full name: Jordan Michael Clarke
- Born: July 10, 1990 (age 36) Anchorage, Alaska

Sport
- Sport: Track and field
- Event: Shot put
- College team: Arizona State Sun Devils

Achievements and titles
- Personal best: 21.49 m (70 ft 6 in)
Medal record
Men's athletics
Representing United States
Pan American Sports Festival
| Gold medal – first place | 2014 Mexico City | Shot put |

Jordan Michael Clarke (born July 10, 1990) is an American track and field athlete who specializes in the shot put. He holds a personal record 21.49 m (70 ft 6 in) for the event, set in 2015. He was the gold medalist at the 2014 Pan American Sports Festival. Clarke was third at the USA Outdoor Track and Field Championships in 2015.

He was a highly successful college athlete with the Arizona State Sun Devils, winning four NCAA collegiate titles – two indoors, two outdoors. He also medalled at the 2009 Pan American Junior Athletics Championships while there.

== Career ==
=== Early life ===
Born in Anchorage, Alaska to Michael and Christine Clarke, he attended Bartlett High School and took part in shot put, discus throw and American football while there (being twice named the school's football captain). After graduation he enrolled at Arizona State University, taking an exploratory major. In his first year there, he redshirted for the Arizona State Sun Devils athletic team and instead competed individually. He won the national junior shot put title, with a throw of 20.46 m (67 ft 1 1/2 in) with the 6 kg junior implement, and also placed 21st as a senior at the 2009 USA Outdoor Track and Field Championships. He received his first international call-up as a result and was runner-up to compatriot Mason Finley at the 2009 Pan American Junior Athletics Championships. That year he set personal bests of 19.49 m (63 ft 11 1/4 in) for the shot put and 61.16 m (200 ft 7 3/4 in) for the discus with senior implements.

=== College ===
He began working with Arizona State's throws coach David Dumble, who was heading a highly successful college throws group. In his first year of collegiate competition, Clarke placed fourth in the shot put at the 2010 Mountain Pacific Sports Federation (MPSF) indoor meet. Outdoors, he was runner-up at the Pacific-10 Conference championships behind fellow Arizona State athlete Ryan Whiting and was part of a school sweep with his fellow alumnus Jason Lewis in third. Clarke was fifth at the NCAA Men's Division I Outdoor Track and Field Championships – a contest won by Whiting. The following year Clarke was second at the MPSF indoor meet and came ninth at the NCAA Men's Indoor Track and Field Championships. With Whiting having graduated, Clarke became the Sun Devils' leading thrower and he continued the team's success at the 2011 Pac-10 Outdoor Championships by winning the shot put, placing runner-up in the discus and coming seventh in the hammer throw. He succeeded Whiting as the NCAA champion that year with a personal record throw of 19.75 m (64 ft 9 1/2 in) in the final. At the end of the year he competed at the national level for a second time, placing 16th overall at the 2011 USA Outdoor Track and Field Championships.

Clarke established himself as America's top collegiate thrower in the 2012 season by winning both the NCAA Indoor Championships and the NCAA Outdoor Championships. He peaked for each final, with a personal best of 20.86 m (68 ft 5 1/4 in) indoors then an outdoor best of 20.40 m (66 ft 11 in). Regionally, he was the MPSF indoor champion and the Pac-12 outdoor champion. He again competed in the discus and hammer at the Pac-12 meet, ranking third and second respectively. He had a new best of 65.39 m (214 ft 6 1/4 in) in the hammer and ultimately finished tenth in that discipline at the NCAA Outdoor Championships. He entered the 2012 United States Olympic Trials and made the final, coming eighth overall. On distance he ranked in the American top ten for the shot put that season and within the top twenty athletes globally.

Clarke began the 2013 indoor season with a series of throws beyond twenty meters, taking in victories at the MPSF meet and a fourth straight shot put title at NCAA level at the NCAA Indoor Track and Field Championships. He also won the weight throw at the MSPF indoor championships. He set a hammer throw best of 66.18 m (217 ft 1 1/2 in) in April before going to the Pac-12 Conference Outdoor Championships to place fifth in that event and take a third straight shot put title At the 2013 NCAA Division I Outdoor Track and Field Championships, he aimed to close his collegiate career with a fifth straight NCAA win, but was denied by a margin of three centimeters by Ryan Crouser of the Texas Longhorns.

Clarke finished at Arizona State having won two NCAA Outdoor titles, two NCAA Indoor titles, and three consecutive titles at the MPSF Conference indoors and the Pac-12 Conference outdoors. His personal bests during his time there ranked him in the top ten of four different throws events. His tally of 24 points across the discus, shot put and hammer at the 2012 Pac-12 Championships made him second to only Dwight Phillips among highest scorers for Arizona State.

=== Professional ===
After graduation from Arizona State, he continued to work with coach David Dumble, fitting in time between his mentor's college duties. The 2014 USA Indoor Track and Field Championships saw him attain his highest national placing yet, taking fourth with a throw of 20.78 m (68 ft 2 in). His international professional debut at the Jamaica International Invitational saw him fail to record a mark, but he rebounded shortly after by clearing the 21-meter mark for the first time with bests of 21.21 m (69 ft 7 in), then 21.37 m (70 ft 1 1/4 in). The latter placed him in the top ten for the discipline globally that season – a new high for the athlete. He was somewhat off that form at the 2012 USA Outdoor Track and Field Championships, coming sixth, but this earned him selection for the 2014 Pan American Sports Festival, where he won comfortably with a mark of 20.57 m (67 ft 5 3/4 in).

He skipped the 2015 indoor season and focused outdoors instead. He made his debut on the 2015 IAAF Diamond League circuit and came near a personal best at the Golden Gala in Rome to place second behind world champion David Storl, before taking second place again after Joe Kovacs at the New York Diamond League. He achieved a personal record of 21.49 m (70 ft 6 in) in the final at the 2015 USA Outdoor Track and Field Championships to place third behind Kovacs and Christian Cantwell, allowing him to represent the United States at the World Championships in Athletics.

Jordan Clarke finished 9th in shot put at 2016 United States Olympic Trials (track and field).

== Personal records ==
- Shot put indoor – 21.49 m (70 ft 6 in) (2015)
- Shot put outdoor – 20.86 m (68 ft 5 1/4 in) (2012)
- Discus throw – 61.16 m (200 ft 7 3/4 in) (2009)
- Hammer throw – 66.18 m (217 ft 1 1/2 in) (2013)
- Weight throw – 19.96 m (65 ft 5 3/4 in) (2013)

== National titles ==
- NCAA Men's Division I Indoor Track and Field Championships
  - Shot put: 2012, 2013
- NCAA Men's Division I Outdoor Track and Field Championships
  - Shot put: 2011, 2012

== International competitions ==
| Year | Competition | Venue | Position | Notes |
|---|---|---|---|---|
| 2009 | Pan American Junior Championships | Port of Spain, Trinidad and Tobago | 2nd | 19.97 m |
| 2014 | Pan American Sports Festival | Mexico City, Mexico | 1st | 20.57 m |
| 2015 | World Championships | Beijing, China | 13th (q) | 19.89 m |
