= Jackie Johnson (heptathlete) =

American heptathlete

Personal information
- Full name: Jacquelyn Kate Johnson
- Nationality: United States
- Born: 8 September 1984 (age 41) San Jose, California
- Height: 1.73 m (5 ft 8 in)
- Weight: 62 kg (137 lb)

Sport
- Sport: Athletics
- Event: Heptathlon
- Team: Arizona State Sun Devils
- Coached by: Dan O'Brien

Achievements and titles
- Personal best: Heptathlon: 6,347 points (2008)

Jacquelyn Kate Johnson (born September 8, 1984, in San Jose, California) is an American heptathlete. She is a four-time NCAA outdoor champion (2004, 2006–2008), and a three-time NCAA indoor champion (2006–2008) while competing for Arizona State University. She also set a personal best of 6,347 points by placing second at the 2008 U.S. Olympic Trials in Eugene, Oregon, which guaranteed her a qualifying place for the Olympics. Johnson was a member of the track and field team for the Arizona State Sun Devils, where she was coached and trained by Dan O'Brien, gold medalist in the decathlon at the 1996 Summer Olympics in Atlanta, Georgia. In 2008, she won the Honda Sports Award as the nation's best female collegiate track and field athlete.

At the 2008 Summer Olympics in Beijing, Johnson competed as a member of the U.S. track and field team in the women's heptathlon, along with her fellow athletes Diana Pickler and Hyleas Fountain. Although she accomplished five events and reached into the higher position, Johnson, however, strained her left hamstring in the long jump, and was forced to withdraw from the competition because of the injury.

She competed for Yuma Union High School, where she won 14 Arizona state championships.

== Personal bests ==
Event	Best	Venue	Year	Notes
100 meter hurdles	13.88 s	Glendale, Arizona, United States	May 9, 2001	
High jump	1.83 m	Tucson, Arizona, United States	January 1, 2003	
Shot put	13.14 m	Des Moines, Iowa, United States	April 22, 2009	
200 meters	24.44 s	San Francisco, California, United States	June 9, 2006	
Long jump	6.12 m	Des Moines, Iowa, United States	June 14, 2008	
Javelin throw	47.71 m	Eugene, Oregon, United States	June 28, 2008	
800 meters	2:15.75	Des Moines, Iowa, United States	JApril 23, 2009	
Heptathlon	6,347 points	Eugene, Oregon, United States	June 28, 2008	

- All information taken from IAAF profile.
