= Purdue Boilermakers track and field =

College track and field team

- University: Purdue University
- Head coach: Tony Miller
- Conference: Big Ten
- Location: West Lafayette, Indiana
- Outdoor track: Rankin Track & Field Complex
- Nickname: Boilermakers
- Colors: Old gold and black

The Purdue Boilermakers track and field team is the track and field program that represents Purdue University. The Boilermakers compete in NCAA Division I as a member of the Big Ten Conference. The team is based in West Lafayette, Indiana at the Rankin Track & Field Complex.

The program is coached by Tony Miller. The track and field program officially encompasses four teams because the NCAA considers men's and women's indoor track and field and outdoor track and field as separate sports.

Corissa Yasen has the most All-American finishes of any Purdue athlete, with eight in the high jump and one national title in the women's heptathlon from 1993 to 1996.

== Postseason ==
=== AIAW ===
The Boilermakers have had 13 AIAW All-Americans finishing in the top six at the AIAW indoor or outdoor championships.

AIAW All-Americans
Championships	Name	Event	Place
1979 Outdoor	Peach Payne	400 meters hurdles	3rd
1982 Indoor	Jymette Bonnivier	880 yards	5th
1982 Outdoor	Sybil Perry	100 meters	5th
1982 Outdoor	Sybil Perry	200 meters	6th
1982 Outdoor	Andrea Marek	1500 meters	2nd
1982 Outdoor	Andrea Marek	3000 meters	1st
1982 Outdoor	Alana McCarthy	5000 meters	5th
1982 Outdoor	Lorna Russell	100 meters hurdles	2nd
1982 Outdoor	Raquel Williams	100 meters hurdles	5th
1982 Outdoor	Margaret Woods	High jump	5th
1982 Outdoor	Jymette Bonnivier	4 × 800 meters relay	3rd
1982 Outdoor	Becky Cotta	4 × 800 meters relay	3rd
1982 Outdoor	Jean Molohon	4 × 800 meters relay	3rd
1982 Outdoor	Nancy Sanford	4 × 800 meters relay	3rd
1982 Outdoor	Heidi Hackel	Sprint medley relay	6th
1982 Outdoor	Sybil Perry	Sprint medley relay	6th
1982 Outdoor	Lorna Russell	Sprint medley relay	6th
1982 Outdoor	Maria Williams	Sprint medley relay	6th

=== NCAA ===
As of 2024, a total of 64 men and 35 women have achieved individual first-team All-American status at the Division I men's outdoor, women's outdoor, men's indoor, or women's indoor national championships (using the modern criteria of top-8 placing regardless of athlete nationality).

First team NCAA All-Americans
Team	Championships	Name	Event	Place	Ref.
Men's	1922 Outdoor	Cliff Furnas	Mile run	5th	
Men's	1923 Outdoor	Fred Tykle	100 meters	2nd	
Men's	1926 Outdoor	Jim Little	Mile run	4th	
Men's	1927 Outdoor	Jim Little	Mile run	6th	
Men's	1929 Outdoor	Orval Martin	Mile run	2nd	
Men's	1930 Outdoor	Orval Martin	800 meters	1st	
Men's	1932 Outdoor	Larry Kenney	Mile run	3rd	
Men's	1933 Outdoor	Duane Purvis	Javelin throw	1st	
Men's	1935 Outdoor	Claude Moore	Mile run	3rd	
Men's	1937 Outdoor	Bob Lemen	220 yards hurdles	4th	
Men's	1938 Outdoor	Bob Lemen	220 yards hurdles	6th	
Men's	1939 Outdoor	Ed Holderman	Mile run	4th	
Men's	1944 Outdoor	Bruce Finlayson	110 meters hurdles	5th	
Men's	1944 Outdoor	Ed Steider	110 meters hurdles	6th	
Men's	1944 Outdoor	Jack Exler	3000 meters	3rd	
Men's	1944 Outdoor	Bruce Finlayson	High jump	6th	
Men's	1944 Outdoor	Bill Klaus	Shot put	4th	
Men's	1944 Outdoor	Bill Klaus	Discus throw	5th	
Men's	1945 Outdoor	Ben Harvey	200 meters	6th	
Men's	1945 Outdoor	Ashley Hawk	800 meters	5th	
Men's	1945 Outdoor	Dick Kilpatrick	High jump	3rd	
Men's	1946 Outdoor	Paul Miller	Long jump	4th	
Men's	1946 Outdoor	Bill Bangert	Shot put	4th	
Men's	1951 Outdoor	Jack Barnes	Long jump	8th	
Men's	1953 Outdoor	Tom Hughes	220 yards hurdles	6th	
Men's	1953 Outdoor	Gene Matthews	3000 meters	3rd	
Men's	1954 Outdoor	Tom Hughes	220 yards hurdles	6th	
Men's	1954 Outdoor	Ben Youtsey	400 meters	2nd	
Men's	1954 Outdoor	Gene Matthews	3000 meters	2nd	
Men's	1957 Outdoor	Billy Jones	Pole vault	4th	
Men's	1957 Outdoor	Jim Johnston	Pole vault	7th	
Men's	1958 Outdoor	Jim Johnston	Pole vault	1st	
Men's	1958 Outdoor	Billy Jones	Pole vault	5th	
Men's	1959 Outdoor	Jim Johnston	Pole vault	2nd	
Men's	1962 Outdoor	Nate Adams	200 meters	3rd	
Men's	1962 Outdoor	Dave Mills	400 meters	3rd	
Men's	1963 Outdoor	Nate Adams	100 meters	3rd	
Men's	1963 Outdoor	Nate Adams	200 meters	3rd	
Men's	1965 Indoor	Al Washington	400 meters	4th	
Men's	1965 Indoor	Jim Moore	Long jump	5th	
Men's	1972 Outdoor	Larry Burton	200 meters	1st	
Men's	1972 Outdoor	Larry Grambo	4 × 100 meters relay	3rd	
Men's	1972 Outdoor	Carl Capria	4 × 100 meters relay	3rd	
Men's	1972 Outdoor	Dave Lichtenheld	4 × 100 meters relay	3rd	
Men's	1972 Outdoor	Larry Burton	4 × 100 meters relay	3rd	
Men's	1972 Outdoor	Jeff Bolin	Long jump	7th	
Men's	1973 Outdoor	Larry Burton	100 meters	6th	
Men's	1974 Indoor	Lawrence Burton	55 meters	4th	
Men's	1974 Indoor	Jeff Bolin	Long jump	5th	
Men's	1974 Outdoor	Jeff Bolin	Long jump	6th	
Men's	1977 Indoor	Noel Ruebel	High jump	5th	
Men's	1977 Outdoor	Noel Ruebel	High jump	6th	
Men's	1978 Indoor	Ken Sombru	Distance medley relay	5th	
Men's	1978 Indoor	John Hester	Distance medley relay	5th	
Men's	1978 Indoor	Joe Menzyk	Distance medley relay	5th	
Men's	1978 Indoor	Tim Smith	Distance medley relay	5th	
Men's	1980 Outdoor	Ed Langford	Pole vault	8th	
Men's	1981 Indoor	Ed Langford	Pole vault	1st	
Men's	1983 Outdoor	Alvin McNair	200 meters	4th	
Women's	1984 Indoor	Rebecca Cotta	1000 meters	5th	
Women's	1984 Indoor	Cynthia Cassell	4 × 800 meters relay	2nd	
Women's	1984 Indoor	Jymette Bonnivier	4 × 800 meters relay	2nd	
Women's	1984 Indoor	Jeanie Molohon	4 × 800 meters relay	2nd	
Women's	1984 Indoor	Becky Cotta	4 × 800 meters relay	2nd	
Women's	1984 Outdoor	Sybil Perry	4 × 400 meters relay	8th	
Women's	1984 Outdoor	Teresa Rozier	4 × 400 meters relay	8th	
Women's	1984 Outdoor	Heidi Hackel	4 × 400 meters relay	8th	
Women's	1984 Outdoor	Jill Sias	4 × 400 meters relay	8th	
Women's	1984 Outdoor	Yvonne Netterville	Triple jump	6th	
Men's	1985 Indoor	Rod Woodson	55 meters hurdles	2nd	
Women's	1985 Indoor	Alicia Bass	55 meters hurdles	3rd	
Women's	1985 Indoor	Yvonne Netterville	Triple jump	4th	
Women's	1985 Outdoor	Cathey Tyree	Heptathlon	7th	
Women's	1986 Indoor	Andrea Everett	3000 meters	6th	
Women's	1986 Outdoor	Sybil Perry	400 meters hurdles	6th	
Women's	1986 Outdoor	Cathey Tyree	Heptathlon	6th	
Men's	1987 Indoor	Rod Woodson	55 meters hurdles	3rd	
Women's	1987 Outdoor	Andra Paolillo	10,000 meters	5th	
Women's	1987 Outdoor	Cathey Tyree	Heptathlon	3rd	
Men's	1988 Indoor	David Glassbum	High jump	6th	
Men's	1988 Indoor	Monty Weller	Pole vault	3rd	
Women's	1988 Indoor	Sally Smith	800 meters	5th	
Women's	1988 Indoor	Angela Goodman	Triple jump	6th	
Men's	1988 Outdoor	Monte Weller	Pole vault	2nd	
Women's	1988 Outdoor	Sally Smith	1500 meters	3rd	
Women's	1988 Outdoor	Tia Hensler	High jump	2nd	
Women's	1988 Outdoor	Jamie McNeair	Heptathlon	3rd	
Men's	1989 Indoor	Bill Bluethmann	High jump	6th	
Men's	1989 Indoor	Greg Fenza	Pole vault	8th	
Men's	1989 Outdoor	Greg Fenza	Pole vault	5th	
Women's	1989 Outdoor	Jamie McNeair	Heptathlon	4th	
Men's	1990 Indoor	Greg Fenza	Pole vault	4th	
Men's	1990 Outdoor	Greg Fenza	Pole vault	8th	
Women's	1990 Outdoor	Jamie McNeair	Heptathlon	3rd	
Women's	1993 Indoor	Corissa Yasen	High jump	4th	
Women's	1993 Outdoor	Corissa Yasen	High jump	6th	
Women's	1993 Outdoor	Sami Jo Williamson	Discus throw	8th	
Women's	1994 Indoor	Corissa Yasen	High jump	4th	
Women's	1994 Outdoor	Corissa Yasen	High jump	5th	
Women's	1995 Indoor	Corissa Yasen	High jump	3rd	
Men's	1995 Outdoor	Jon Pergande	Decathlon	6th	
Women's	1995 Outdoor	Corissa Yasen	High jump	6th	
Men's	1996 Indoor	Randy Miller	Pole vault	8th	
Women's	1996 Indoor	Corissa Yasen	High jump	2nd	
Women's	1996 Outdoor	Corissa Yasen	High jump	8th	
Women's	1996 Outdoor	Corissa Yasen	Heptathlon	1st	
Men's	1997 Outdoor	Randy Miller	Pole vault	6th	
Men's	1998 Indoor	Randy Miller	Pole vault	4th	
Women's	1998 Indoor	Toyinda Smith	Weight throw	4th	
Men's	1999 Indoor	Mike Turner	Triple jump	3rd	
Men's	1999 Indoor	Ike Olekaibe	Triple jump	8th	
Women's	1999 Indoor	Toyinda Smith	Weight throw	1st	
Women's	1999 Outdoor	Carrie Long	High jump	8th	
Women's	1999 Outdoor	Serene Ross	Javelin throw	7th	
Men's	2000 Indoor	Chris Brown	Weight throw	7th	
Women's	2000 Indoor	Carri Long	High jump	2nd	
Women's	2000 Indoor	Amy Spellmeyer	Pole vault	6th	
Men's	2000 Outdoor	Shaun Guice	High jump	5th	
Men's	2000 Outdoor	Ike Olekaibe	Triple jump	3rd	
Women's	2000 Outdoor	Carri Long	High jump	6th	
Men's	2001 Indoor	Shaun Guice	High jump	2nd	
Men's	2001 Outdoor	Shaun Guice	High jump	5th	
Women's	2001 Outdoor	Serene Ross	Javelin throw	6th	
Women's	2001 Outdoor	Angela Craft	Heptathlon	6th	
Men's	2002 Indoor	Shaun Guice	High jump	3rd	
Men's	2002 Outdoor	Ryan Fitzpatric	High jump	6th	
Women's	2002 Outdoor	Serene Ross	Javelin throw	1st	
Men's	2003 Indoor	Kenneth Baxter	200 meters	4th	
Men's	2003 Indoor	Shaun Guice	High jump	2nd	
Men's	2003 Outdoor	Kenneth Baxter	200 meters	7th	
Men's	2003 Outdoor	Nedzad Mulabegovic	Shot put	4th	
Men's	2004 Indoor	Kenneth Baxter	200 meters	2nd	
Men's	2004 Indoor	Nedzad Mulabegovic	Shot put	4th	
Men's	2004 Indoor	Keith McBride	Weight throw	2nd	
Men's	2004 Indoor	Scott Hecht	Weight throw	5th	
Men's	2004 Outdoor	Shaun Guice	High jump	6th	
Women's	2004 Outdoor	Amber Ferner	3000 meters steeplechase	7th	
Men's	2005 Indoor	Nedzad Mulabegovic	Shot put	2nd	
Men's	2005 Outdoor	John Paul Smolenski	Hammer throw	5th	
Men's	2006 Indoor	Rickey Pinkney	60 meters hurdles	7th	
Women's	2007 Indoor	Mallory Peck	Pole vault	7th	
Women's	2007 Outdoor	Lindsey Blaine	Javelin throw	1st	
Men's	2008 Indoor	Jon Pullum	Weight throw	4th	
Women's	2008 Indoor	Mallory Peck	Pole vault	6th	
Women's	2008 Indoor	Astin Steward	Weight throw	3rd	
Women's	2008 Outdoor	Kara Winger	Javelin throw	5th	
Men's	2009 Indoor	Josh Hembrough	60 meters hurdles	8th	
Men's	2009 Outdoor	Adetayo Adesanya	High jump	5th	
Women's	2009 Outdoor	Stacey Wannemacher	Shot put	4th	
Women's	2009 Outdoor	Kara Winger	Javelin throw	2nd	
Women's	2010 Indoor	Stacey Wannemacher	Shot put	7th	
Men's	2011 Indoor	Geoff Davis	High jump	4th	
Men's	2011 Outdoor	Geoff Davis	High jump	6th	
Women's	2011 Outdoor	Stacey Wannemacher	Shot put	8th	
Women's	2012 Indoor	Leah Eber	Long jump	3rd	
Men's	2013 Indoor	Geoff Davis	High jump	5th	
Men's	2013 Indoor	Jakob Engel	Shot put	8th	
Men's	2013 Indoor	Chuk Enekwechi	Weight throw	3rd	
Men's	2013 Outdoor	Geoff Davis	High jump	3rd	
Women's	2013 Outdoor	Dani Bunch	Shot put	8th	
Men's	2014 Indoor	Chuk Enekwechi	Weight throw	3rd	
Women's	2014 Indoor	Dani Bunch	Shot put	5th	
Women's	2014 Indoor	Dani Bunch	Weight throw	3rd	
Women's	2014 Outdoor	Dani Bunch	Shot put	5th	
Men's	2015 Indoor	Chuk Enekwechi	Weight throw	3rd	
Men's	2015 Outdoor	Matt McClintock	10,000 meters	7th	
Men's	2015 Outdoor	Chuk Enekwechi	Hammer throw	6th	
Women's	2015 Outdoor	Devynne Charlton	100 meters hurdles	7th	
Women's	2015 Outdoor	Savannah Carson	4 × 100 meters relay	6th	
Women's	2015 Outdoor	Carmiesha Cox	4 × 100 meters relay	6th	
Women's	2015 Outdoor	Devynne Charlton	4 × 100 meters relay	6th	
Women's	2015 Outdoor	Brionna Thomas	4 × 100 meters relay	6th	
Women's	2015 Outdoor	Symone Black	4 × 400 meters relay	4th	
Women's	2015 Outdoor	Carmiesha Cox	4 × 400 meters relay	4th	
Women's	2015 Outdoor	Aarin Jones	4 × 400 meters relay	4th	
Women's	2015 Outdoor	Brionna Thomas	4 × 400 meters relay	4th	
Men's	2016 Indoor	Nicholas Parks	4 × 400 meters relay	7th	
Men's	2016 Indoor	Kyle Webb	4 × 400 meters relay	7th	
Men's	2016 Indoor	Kinard Rolle	4 × 400 meters relay	7th	
Men's	2016 Indoor	Shawndail McLaren	4 × 400 meters relay	7th	
Men's	2016 Indoor	Chuk Enekwechi	Shot put	4th	
Men's	2016 Indoor	Chuk Enekwechi	Weight throw	2nd	
Women's	2016 Indoor	Devynne Charlton	60 meters hurdles	3rd	
Men's	2016 Outdoor	Nicholas Parks	4 × 400 meters relay	6th	
Men's	2016 Outdoor	Kyle Webb	4 × 400 meters relay	6th	
Men's	2016 Outdoor	Kendal Frederick	4 × 400 meters relay	6th	
Men's	2016 Outdoor	Shawndail McLaren	4 × 400 meters relay	6th	
Men's	2016 Outdoor	Chuk Enekwechi	Shot put	2nd	
Men's	2016 Outdoor	Chuk Enekwechi	Hammer throw	6th	
Women's	2016 Outdoor	Jessica Harter	Pole vault	6th	
Women's	2017 Indoor	Devynne Charlton	60 meters hurdles	2nd	
Women's	2017 Indoor	Savannah Carson	Long jump	5th	
Women's	2017 Outdoor	Devynne Charlton	100 meters hurdles	5th	
Women's	2017 Outdoor	Devynne Charlton	4 × 100 meters relay	7th	
Women's	2017 Outdoor	Carmeisha Cox	4 × 100 meters relay	7th	
Women's	2017 Outdoor	Savannah Roberson	4 × 100 meters relay	7th	
Women's	2017 Outdoor	Savannah Carson	4 × 100 meters relay	7th	
Women's	2017 Outdoor	Savannah Carson	Long jump	7th	
Women's	2018 Indoor	Brionna Thomas	400 meters	5th	
Women's	2018 Indoor	Chloe Abbott	4 × 400 meters relay	2nd	
Women's	2018 Indoor	Brionna Thomas	4 × 400 meters relay	2nd	
Women's	2018 Indoor	Carmiesha Cox	4 × 400 meters relay	2nd	
Women's	2018 Indoor	Jahneya Mitchell	4 × 400 meters relay	2nd	
Women's	2018 Indoor	Sarah Loesch	Weight throw	7th	
Men's	2018 Outdoor	Ashmon Lucus	Discus throw	6th	
Women's	2018 Outdoor	Devynne Charlton	100 meters hurdles	2nd	
Women's	2018 Outdoor	Brionna Thomas	400 meters	3rd	
Women's	2018 Outdoor	Chloe Abbott	400 meters	5th	
Women's	2018 Outdoor	Symone Black	400 meters hurdles	4th	
Women's	2018 Outdoor	Chloe Abbott	4 × 400 meters relay	2nd	
Women's	2018 Outdoor	Brionna Thomas	4 × 400 meters relay	2nd	
Women's	2018 Outdoor	Symone Black	4 × 400 meters relay	2nd	
Women's	2018 Outdoor	Jahneya Mitchell	4 × 400 meters relay	2nd	
Women's	2018 Outdoor	Savannah Carson	Long jump	6th	
Men's	2019 Outdoor	Waseem Williams	100 meters	4th	
Men's	2019 Outdoor	Tamar Greene	4 × 100 meters relay	7th	
Men's	2019 Outdoor	Samson Colebrooke	4 × 100 meters relay	7th	
Men's	2019 Outdoor	Justin Becker	4 × 100 meters relay	7th	
Men's	2019 Outdoor	Waseem Williams	4 × 100 meters relay	7th	
Men's	2021 Indoor	Tamar Greene	Triple jump	7th	
Men's	2024 Outdoor	Praise Aniamaka	Triple jump	6th	
Women's	2025 Indoor	Jalen Elrod	Pentathlon	8th	

== See also ==
- Category:Purdue Boilermakers men's track and field athletes (21)
- Category:Purdue Boilermakers women's track and field athletes (8)
