= Ohio State Buckeyes track and field =

College track and field team

- University: Ohio State University
- Head coach: Rosalind Joseph
- Conference: Big Ten
- Location: Columbus, Ohio
- Outdoor track: Jesse Owens Memorial Stadium
- Nickname: Buckeyes
- Colors: Scarlet and gray

NCAA Outdoor National Championships
- Men: 1929

Conference Indoor Championships
- Men: 1942, 1948, 1949, 1950, 1993, 2018; Women: 2011, 2015

Conference Outdoor Championships
- Men: 1942, 1948, 1992, 1993, 2018, 2022; Women: 2011, 2012

The Ohio State Buckeyes track and field team is the track and field program that represents Ohio State University. The Buckeyes compete in NCAA Division I as a member of the Big Ten Conference. The team is based in Columbus, Ohio at the Jesse Owens Memorial Stadium. Both indoor and outdoor men's teams were founded in 1913.

The program is coached by Rosalind Joseph. The track and field program officially encompasses four teams because the NCAA considers men's and women's indoor track and field and outdoor track and field as separate sports.

Ohio State won their first and only track and field national team title at the 1929 NCAA Track and Field Championships. Ohio State has a total of 16 Big Ten team Championships in both men's and women's indoor and outdoor. Jesse Owens is widely considered as being the most accomplished athlete to run for Ohio State, and compete in the Big Ten's history. In his collegiate career, Owen's won eight NCAA Division I Men's Outdoor Track and Field Championships titles across the 100 meters, 200 meters, 220 yards hurdles, and long jump.

== Coaches ==
=== Men's Track and Field Coaches (1913-Present): ===
- Frank Castleman: 1913-1916
- N.M. Graham: 1917
- Frank Castleman: 1918-1919
- N.M. Graham: 1920-1921
- George Rider: 1922-1924
- Frank Castleman: 1925-1927
- George Olsen: 1928-1931
- Larry Snyder: 1932-1965 (Legendary coach, coached Jesse Owens)
- Robert Epskamp: 1966-1987
- Russ Rogers: 1988-1995
- Jim Hevel: 1996-2013
- Karen Dennis: 2014-2021 (Director of Track and Field/Cross Country)
- Rosalind Joseph: 2021-Present (Director of Track and Field/Cross Country)

== Postseason ==
=== AIAW ===
The Buckeyes have had 4 AIAW All-Americans finishing in the top six at the AIAW indoor or outdoor championships.

AIAW All-Americans
| Championships | Name | Event | Place |
|---|---|---|---|
| 1978 Outdoor | Stephanie Hightower | 100 meters hurdles | 3rd |
| 1979 Outdoor | Stephanie Hightower | 100 meters hurdles | 1st |
| 1980 Indoor | Stephanie Hightower | 60 meters | 4th |
| 1980 Indoor | Stephanie Hightower | 60 meters hurdles | 1st |
| 1980 Outdoor | Stephanie Hightower | 100 meters hurdles | 1st |
| 1982 Outdoor | Donithy Jones | 200 meters | 3rd |
| 1982 Outdoor | Donithy Jones | 400 meters | 3rd |
| 1982 Outdoor | Antoinette Jackson | 100 meters hurdles | 6th |
| 1982 Outdoor | Nadine Cox | Discus throw | 3rd |

=== NCAA ===
As of 2024, a total of 116 men and 34 women have achieved individual first-team All-American status at the Division I men's outdoor, women's outdoor, men's indoor, or women's indoor national championships (using the modern criteria of top-8 placing regardless of athlete nationality).

First team NCAA All-Americans
| Team | Championships | Name | Event | Place | Ref. |
|---|---|---|---|---|---|
| Men's | 1921 Outdoor | Oscar Ferguson | Mile run | 4th | |
| Men's | 1921 Outdoor | Pete Stinchcomb | Long jump | 1st | |
| Men's | 1922 Outdoor | Walter Wikoff | Mile run | 4th | |
| Men's | 1922 Outdoor | James Shidecker | High jump | 5th | |
| Men's | 1922 Outdoor | Sam White | Hammer throw | 4th | |
| Men's | 1923 Outdoor | Larry Snyder | 220 yards hurdles | 7th | |
| Men's | 1925 Outdoor | George Guthrie | 220 yards hurdles | 3rd | |
| Men's | 1925 Outdoor | George Guthrie | 110 meters hurdles | 2nd | |
| Men's | 1925 Outdoor | Larry Snyder | 110 meters hurdles | 3rd | |
| Men's | 1925 Outdoor | Ralph Bunker | Hammer throw | 1st | |
| Men's | 1926 Outdoor | Lawrence Irwin | 220 yards hurdles | 3rd | |
| Men's | 1926 Outdoor | George Guthrie | 220 yards hurdles | 4th | |
| Men's | 1926 Outdoor | George Guthrie | 110 meters hurdles | 1st | |
| Men's | 1927 Outdoor | Harold Kennedy | 3000 meters | 2nd | |
| Men's | 1927 Outdoor | Peter Rasmus | Discus throw | 6th | |
| Men's | 1928 Outdoor | Dick Rockaway | 220 yards hurdles | 6th | |
| Men's | 1928 Outdoor | George Simpson | 200 meters | 2nd | |
| Men's | 1928 Outdoor | Warren Anson | High jump | 3rd | |
| Men's | 1928 Outdoor | Peter Rasmus | Discus throw | 3rd | |
| Men's | 1928 Outdoor | Joe Ujhelyi | Hammer throw | 6th | |
| Men's | 1929 Outdoor | Dick Rockaway | 220 yards hurdles | 2nd | |
| Men's | 1929 Outdoor | George Simpson | 100 meters | 1st | |
| Men's | 1929 Outdoor | Dick Rockaway | 110 meters hurdles | 1st | |
| Men's | 1929 Outdoor | George Simpson | 200 meters | 1st | |
| Men's | 1929 Outdoor | Peter Rasmus | Discus throw | 1st | |
| Men's | 1929 Outdoor | Joe Ujhelyi | Hammer throw | 5th | |
| Men's | 1930 Outdoor | Dick Rockaway | 220 yards hurdles | 2nd | |
| Men's | 1930 Outdoor | George Simpson | 100 meters | 2nd | |
| Men's | 1930 Outdoor | George Simpson | 200 meters | 1st | |
| Men's | 1930 Outdoor | Raymond Felbinger | High jump | 2nd | |
| Men's | 1931 Outdoor | Jack Keller | 220 yards hurdles | 1st | |
| Men's | 1931 Outdoor | Jesse Fazekas | 100 meters | 5th | |
| Men's | 1931 Outdoor | Jack Keller | 110 meters hurdles | 1st | |
| Men's | 1931 Outdoor | Jesse Fezekas | 200 meters | 4th | |
| Men's | 1931 Outdoor | Bill Bloor | 800 meters | 4th | |
| Men's | 1931 Outdoor | Ralston Russell | High jump | 6th | |
| Men's | 1931 Outdoor | Guilford Hoiston | Long jump | 6th | |
| Men's | 1932 Outdoor | Jack Keller | 220 yards hurdles | 1st | |
| Men's | 1932 Outdoor | Don Bennett | 100 meters | 2nd | |
| Men's | 1932 Outdoor | John Black | 110 meters hurdles | 2nd | |
| Men's | 1932 Outdoor | Jack Keller | 110 meters hurdles | 3rd | |
| Men's | 1932 Outdoor | Don Bennett | 200 meters | 3rd | |
| Men's | 1932 Outdoor | Ralston Russell | High jump | 6th | |
| Men's | 1932 Outdoor | John Wonsowicz | Pole vault | 2nd | |
| Men's | 1932 Outdoor | Elmer Johnson | Hammer throw | 4th | |
| Men's | 1932 Outdoor | Dana Smith | Javelin throw | 4th | |
| Men's | 1933 Outdoor | John Wonsowicz | Pole vault | 3rd | |
| Men's | 1933 Outdoor | Elmer Johnson | Hammer throw | 6th | |
| Men's | 1935 Outdoor | Jesse Owens | 220 yards hurdles | 1st | |
| Men's | 1935 Outdoor | Jesse Owens | 100 meters | 1st | |
| Men's | 1935 Outdoor | Jesse Owens | 200 meters | 1st | |
| Men's | 1935 Outdoor | John Wonsowicz | Pole vault | 6th | |
| Men's | 1935 Outdoor | Jesse Owens | Long jump | 1st | |
| Men's | 1936 Outdoor | Jesse Owens | 220 yards hurdles | 1st | |
| Men's | 1936 Outdoor | Jesse Owens | 100 meters | 1st | |
| Men's | 1936 Outdoor | Jesse Owens | 200 meters | 1st | |
| Men's | 1936 Outdoor | Charles Beetham | 800 meters | 1st | |
| Men's | 1936 Outdoor | George O'Brien | 800 meters | 5th | |
| Men's | 1936 Outdoor | Tom Sexton | 1500 meters | 6th | |
| Men's | 1936 Outdoor | Paul Benner | 5000 meters | 5th | |
| Men's | 1936 Outdoor | Dave Albritton | High jump | 1st | |
| Men's | 1936 Outdoor | Mel Walker | High jump | 1st | |
| Men's | 1936 Outdoor | Jesse Owens | Long jump | 1st | |
| Men's | 1937 Outdoor | Harley Howells | 400 meters | 3rd | |
| Men's | 1937 Outdoor | Charles Beetham | 800 meters | 3rd | |
| Men's | 1937 Outdoor | Dick Squire | 800 meters | 5th | |
| Men's | 1937 Outdoor | Dave Albritton | High jump | 1st | |
| Men's | 1937 Outdoor | Mel Walker | High jump | 4th | |
| Men's | 1938 Outdoor | Bob Lewis | 200 meters | 6th | |
| Men's | 1938 Outdoor | Harley Howells | 400 meters | 4th | |
| Men's | 1938 Outdoor | Dave Albritton | High jump | 1st | |
| Men's | 1938 Outdoor | Charles Walker | Long jump | 3rd | |
| Men's | 1939 Outdoor | Les Eisenhart | 800 meters | 6th | |
| Men's | 1939 Outdoor | James Whittaker | 3000 meters | 6th | |
| Men's | 1939 Outdoor | Howard Ell | Javelin throw | 7th | |
| Men's | 1940 Outdoor | Jack Sulzman | 400 meters | 6th | |
| Men's | 1941 Outdoor | Robert Wright | 220 yards hurdles | 1st | |
| Men's | 1941 Outdoor | Robert Wright | 110 meters hurdles | 1st | |
| Men's | 1941 Outdoor | Les Eisenhart | 800 meters | 5th | |
| Men's | 1941 Outdoor | Emil Moldea | Shot put | 5th | |
| Men's | 1941 Outdoor | Robert Johnston | Discus throw | 6th | |
| Men's | 1942 Outdoor | Robert Wright | 220 yards hurdles | 1st | |
| Men's | 1942 Outdoor | Robert Wright | 110 meters hurdles | 1st | |
| Men's | 1942 Outdoor | Russell Owen | 400 meters | 4th | |
| Men's | 1942 Outdoor | Leroy Collins | 400 meters | 7th | |
| Men's | 1942 Outdoor | George Hoeflinger | High jump | 6th | |
| Men's | 1942 Outdoor | John Schmidt | Pole vault | 5th | |
| Men's | 1942 Outdoor | Dallas Dupre | Long jump | 1st | |
| Men's | 1942 Outdoor | Robert Johnston | Discus throw | 2nd | |
| Men's | 1943 Outdoor | Paul Hatfield | 100 meters | 6th | |
| Men's | 1943 Outdoor | George Hoeflinger | High jump | 6th | |
| Men's | 1943 Outdoor | Dallas Dupre | Long jump | 4th | |
| Men's | 1944 Outdoor | John Schmidt | Pole vault | 1st | |
| Men's | 1944 Outdoor | Ralph Tyler | Long jump | 1st | |
| Men's | 1944 Outdoor | Jack Dugger | Discus throw | 3rd | |
| Men's | 1945 Outdoor | Jack Dugger | Shot put | 5th | |
| Men's | 1945 Outdoor | Jack Dugger | Discus throw | 3rd | |
| Men's | 1946 Outdoor | Carl Baynard | 400 meters | 5th | |
| Men's | 1946 Outdoor | Mal Whitfield | 800 meters | 2nd | |
| Men's | 1946 Outdoor | Lloyd Duff | Long jump | 8th | |
| Men's | 1946 Outdoor | Emil Moldea | Shot put | 6th | |
| Men's | 1947 Outdoor | Bill Clifford | 800 meters | 1st | |
| Men's | 1948 Outdoor | Mal Whitfield | 400 meters | 4th | |
| Men's | 1948 Outdoor | Mal Whitfield | 800 meters | 1st | |
| Men's | 1948 Outdoor | Bill Clifford | 800 meters | 5th | |
| Men's | 1949 Outdoor | Mal Whitfield | 800 meters | 1st | |
| Men's | 1949 Outdoor | Bill Miller | Discus throw | 3rd | |
| Men's | 1950 Outdoor | Len Truex | 800 meters | 2nd | |
| Men's | 1951 Outdoor | Len Truex | Mile run | 5th | |
| Men's | 1952 Outdoor | Len Truex | 1500 meters | 4th | |
| Men's | 1953 Outdoor | Jerry Welbourn | Pole vault | 3rd | |
| Men's | 1953 Outdoor | Joe Morgan | Shot put | 6th | |
| Men's | 1954 Outdoor | Meade Burnett | 400 meters | 6th | |
| Men's | 1956 Outdoor | Glenn Davis | 400 meters hurdles | 2nd | |
| Men's | 1956 Outdoor | Stan Lyons | Pole vault | 7th | |
| Men's | 1958 Outdoor | Glenn Davis | 400 meters | 1st | |
| Men's | 1958 Outdoor | Stan Lyons | Pole vault | 1st | |
| Men's | 1958 Outdoor | Jim Marshall | Discus throw | 8th | |
| Men's | 1962 Outdoor | Paul Warfield | Long jump | 2nd | |
| Men's | 1963 Outdoor | Paul Warfield | Long jump | 3rd | |
| Men's | 1964 Outdoor | Bob Neutzling | Pole vault | 8th | |
| Men's | 1970 Indoor | Jimmie Harris | 55 meters | 5th | |
| Men's | 1970 Indoor | Dick Bruggeman | 600 yards | 4th | |
| Men's | 1970 Outdoor | Ray Hupp | Decathlon | 7th | |
| Men's | 1971 Indoor | Jimmie Harris | 55 meters | 3rd | |
| Men's | 1971 Outdoor | Jimmie Harris | 100 meters | 3rd | |
| Men's | 1971 Outdoor | Jimmie Harris | 200 meters | 8th | |
| Men's | 1971 Outdoor | Vincent Johnson | 4 × 100 meters relay | 6th | |
| Men's | 1971 Outdoor | Jerry Hill | 4 × 100 meters relay | 6th | |
| Men's | 1971 Outdoor | Fred Collins | 4 × 100 meters relay | 6th | |
| Men's | 1971 Outdoor | Jimmie Harris | 4 × 100 meters relay | 6th | |
| Men's | 1971 Outdoor | Ray Hupp | Decathlon | 1st | |
| Men's | 1972 Indoor | Jimmie Harris | 55 meters | 4th | |
| Men's | 1973 Indoor | Jim Green | Pole vault | 2nd | |
| Men's | 1974 Indoor | Jim Green | Pole vault | 5th | |
| Men's | 1976 Indoor | Tom Byers | 1000 meters | 3rd | |
| Men's | 1979 Outdoor | Dan Oliver | 110 meters hurdles | 2nd | |
| Men's | 1980 Outdoor | Ulysses Cohen | 400 meters | 8th | |
| Men's | 1982 Indoor | Scott Rider | 800 meters | 5th | |
| Men's | 1982 Indoor | Kevin Akins | Shot put | 2nd | |
| Men's | 1982 Outdoor | Scott Rider | 800 meters | 5th | |
| Men's | 1982 Outdoor | Kevin Akins | Shot put | 3rd | |
| Women's | 1983 Indoor | Diane Dixon | 400 meters | 1st | |
| Men's | 1983 Outdoor | Mike Anderson | 800 meters | 5th | |
| Women's | 1983 Outdoor | Diane Dixon | 400 meters | 6th | |
| Men's | 1984 Indoor | George Nicholas | 55 meters | 4th | |
| Men's | 1984 Indoor | Mike Anderson | 800 meters | 5th | |
| Men's | 1985 Indoor | Glenn Klassa | 1500 meters | 4th | |
| Women's | 1986 Outdoor | Kathryn Monard | 3000 meters | 4th | |
| Men's | 1987 Indoor | Butch Reynolds | 500 meters | 3rd | |
| Men's | 1987 Outdoor | Butch Reynolds | 400 meters | 1st | |
| Women's | 1988 Outdoor | Bridgette Tate | 100 meters hurdles | 8th | |
| Men's | 1989 Indoor | Joe Greene | Long jump | 3rd | |
| Men's | 1989 Indoor | Joe Greene | Triple jump | 2nd | |
| Women's | 1989 Indoor | Bridgette Tate | 55 meters hurdles | 3rd | |
| Men's | 1989 Outdoor | Joe Greene | Long jump | 1st | |
| Men's | 1990 Indoor | Joe Greene | Long jump | 3rd | |
| Men's | 1990 Outdoor | Mark Croghan | 3000 meters steeplechase | 1st | |
| Men's | 1990 Outdoor | Joe Greene | Triple jump | 3rd | |
| Men's | 1991 Outdoor | Mark Croghan | 3000 meters steeplechase | 1st | |
| Men's | 1991 Outdoor | Mark Cannon | High jump | 6th | |
| Women's | 1991 Outdoor | Arnita Green | 400 meters hurdles | 8th | |
| Men's | 1992 Indoor | Chris Nelloms | 200 meters | 2nd | |
| Men's | 1992 Indoor | Chris Sanders | Long jump | 2nd | |
| Men's | 1992 Outdoor | Chris Nelloms | 200 meters | 3rd | |
| Men's | 1992 Outdoor | Jordan Gray | 400 meters hurdles | 4th | |
| Men's | 1992 Outdoor | Butler B'ynote' | 4 × 100 meters relay | 2nd | |
| Men's | 1992 Outdoor | Chris Nelloms | 4 × 100 meters relay | 2nd | |
| Men's | 1992 Outdoor | Aaron Payne | 4 × 100 meters relay | 2nd | |
| Men's | 1992 Outdoor | Chris Sanders | 4 × 100 meters relay | 2nd | |
| Men's | 1992 Outdoor | Rich Jones | 4 × 400 meters relay | 4th | |
| Men's | 1992 Outdoor | Aaron Payne | 4 × 400 meters relay | 4th | |
| Men's | 1992 Outdoor | Robert Smith | 4 × 400 meters relay | 4th | |
| Men's | 1992 Outdoor | Chris Nelloms | 4 × 400 meters relay | 4th | |
| Men's | 1992 Outdoor | Chris Sanders | Long jump | 6th | |
| Men's | 1992 Outdoor | Todd Trimble | Long jump | 8th | |
| Women's | 1992 Outdoor | Arnita Green | 400 meters hurdles | 6th | |
| Women's | 1992 Outdoor | Teresa Sherman | Discus throw | 6th | |
| Men's | 1993 Indoor | Chris Nelloms | 200 meters | 1st | |
| Men's | 1993 Indoor | Clive Brooks | 4 × 400 meters relay | 2nd | |
| Men's | 1993 Indoor | Butler B'ynote' | 4 × 400 meters relay | 2nd | |
| Men's | 1993 Indoor | Rich Jones | 4 × 400 meters relay | 2nd | |
| Men's | 1993 Indoor | Chris Sanders | 4 × 400 meters relay | 2nd | |
| Men's | 1993 Indoor | Chris Sanders | Long jump | 5th | |
| Men's | 1993 Outdoor | Chris Nelloms | 200 meters | 1st | |
| Men's | 1993 Outdoor | Jordan Gray | 400 meters hurdles | 2nd | |
| Men's | 1993 Outdoor | Butler B'ynote' | 4 × 100 meters relay | 3rd | |
| Men's | 1993 Outdoor | Chris Nelloms | 4 × 100 meters relay | 3rd | |
| Men's | 1993 Outdoor | Aaron Payne | 4 × 100 meters relay | 3rd | |
| Men's | 1993 Outdoor | Chris Sanders | 4 × 100 meters relay | 3rd | |
| Men's | 1993 Outdoor | Rich Jones | 4 × 400 meters relay | 1st | |
| Men's | 1993 Outdoor | Aaron Payne | 4 × 400 meters relay | 1st | |
| Men's | 1993 Outdoor | Robert Smith | 4 × 400 meters relay | 1st | |
| Men's | 1993 Outdoor | Chris Nelloms | 4 × 400 meters relay | 1st | |
| Men's | 1993 Outdoor | Otis Winston | High jump | 3rd | |
| Men's | 1993 Outdoor | Chris Sanders | Long jump | 5th | |
| Men's | 1993 Outdoor | Todd Trimble | Long jump | 8th | |
| Women's | 1993 Outdoor | Arnita Green | 400 meters hurdles | 4th | |
| Men's | 1994 Indoor | Chris Nelloms | 200 meters | 1st | |
| Men's | 1994 Indoor | Chris Sanders | 200 meters | 5th | |
| Men's | 1994 Indoor | Chris Sanders | Long jump | 4th | |
| Men's | 1994 Outdoor | Chris Sanders | 200 meters | 4th | |
| Men's | 1994 Outdoor | Butler B'ynote' | 4 × 100 meters relay | 6th | |
| Men's | 1994 Outdoor | Clive Brooks | 4 × 100 meters relay | 6th | |
| Men's | 1994 Outdoor | Rich Jones | 4 × 100 meters relay | 6th | |
| Men's | 1994 Outdoor | Chris Sanders | 4 × 100 meters relay | 6th | |
| Men's | 1994 Outdoor | Chris Sanders | Long jump | 7th | |
| Women's | 1994 Outdoor | Shandi Boyd-Pleasant | Triple jump | 8th | |
| Men's | 1995 Indoor | Robert Gary | 3000 meters | 3rd | |
| Men's | 1995 Outdoor | Robert Gary | 3000 meters steeplechase | 4th | |
| Men's | 1996 Indoor | Robert Gary | 3000 meters | 2nd | |
| Men's | 1996 Indoor | Clive Brooks | 4 × 400 meters relay | 8th | |
| Men's | 1996 Indoor | Nakie Fenner | 4 × 400 meters relay | 8th | |
| Men's | 1996 Indoor | Marlon DeLeon | 4 × 400 meters relay | 8th | |
| Men's | 1996 Indoor | Adam Herndon | 4 × 400 meters relay | 8th | |
| Men's | 1997 Indoor | Chris England | 5000 meters | 3rd | |
| Men's | 1997 Indoor | Nakia Fenner | 4 × 400 meters relay | 7th | |
| Men's | 1997 Indoor | Adam Herndon | 4 × 400 meters relay | 7th | |
| Men's | 1997 Indoor | Sekou Smith | 4 × 400 meters relay | 7th | |
| Men's | 1997 Indoor | Eswort Coombs | 4 × 400 meters relay | 7th | |
| Men's | 1997 Outdoor | Chris England | 10,000 meters | 6th | |
| Women's | 1997 Outdoor | Shandi Boyd-Pleasant | 100 meters hurdles | 4th | |
| Women's | 1998 Outdoor | Dominique Calloway | 100 meters hurdles | 6th | |
| Women's | 1998 Outdoor | Donica Merriman | 100 meters hurdles | 7th | |
| Women's | 1998 Outdoor | Tamieka Porter | Triple jump | 8th | |
| Women's | 1999 Outdoor | Dominque Calloway | 100 meters hurdles | 4th | |
| Women's | 1999 Outdoor | Donica Merriman | 100 meters hurdles | 5th | |
| Women's | 1999 Outdoor | Dominque Calloway | 400 meters hurdles | 3rd | |
| Men's | 2000 Indoor | Andrew Pierce | 400 meters | 2nd | |
| Women's | 2000 Indoor | Donica Merriman | 60 meters hurdles | 3rd | |
| Women's | 2000 Indoor | Dominque Calloway | 60 meters hurdles | 8th | |
| Women's | 2000 Indoor | Donica Merriman | 200 meters | 4th | |
| Men's | 2000 Outdoor | Andrew Pierce | 400 meters | 6th | |
| Men's | 2000 Outdoor | Ian Connor | 3000 meters steeplechase | 2nd | |
| Women's | 2000 Outdoor | Donica Merriman | 100 meters hurdles | 3rd | |
| Women's | 2000 Outdoor | Domnique Calloway | 400 meters hurdles | 8th | |
| Men's | 2001 Indoor | Andrew Pierce | 400 meters | 2nd | |
| Women's | 2001 Indoor | Donica Merriman | 60 meters hurdles | 1st | |
| Women's | 2001 Indoor | Katy Craig | Weight throw | 6th | |
| Men's | 2001 Outdoor | Courtney Cornwall | 4 × 400 meters relay | 7th | |
| Men's | 2001 Outdoor | Joel Brown | 4 × 400 meters relay | 7th | |
| Men's | 2001 Outdoor | Thomas Dickson | 4 × 400 meters relay | 7th | |
| Men's | 2001 Outdoor | Andrew Pierce | 4 × 400 meters relay | 7th | |
| Women's | 2001 Outdoor | Donica Merriman | 100 meters hurdles | 1st | |
| Women's | 2002 Indoor | Dalanda Jackson | 60 meters hurdles | 6th | |
| Women's | 2002 Indoor | Tami Smith | High jump | 6th | |
| Women's | 2002 Indoor | Katy Craig | Weight throw | 5th | |
| Women's | 2002 Outdoor | Tami Smith | High jump | 8th | |
| Women's | 2002 Outdoor | Krista Keir | Discus throw | 3rd | |
| Men's | 2003 Indoor | Rob Myers | Mile run | 8th | |
| Men's | 2003 Indoor | Dan Taylor | Shot put | 2nd | |
| Men's | 2003 Indoor | Dan Taylor | Weight throw | 3rd | |
| Men's | 2003 Outdoor | Dan Taylor | Shot put | 3rd | |
| Men's | 2003 Outdoor | Dan Taylor | Discus throw | 8th | |
| Men's | 2004 Indoor | Dan Taylor | Shot put | 1st | |
| Men's | 2004 Indoor | Dan Taylor | Weight throw | 1st | |
| Men's | 2004 Outdoor | Joel Brown | 110 meters hurdles | 3rd | |
| Men's | 2004 Outdoor | Rob Myers | 1500 meters | 4th | |
| Men's | 2004 Outdoor | Aaron Fisher | 3000 meters steeplechase | 4th | |
| Men's | 2004 Outdoor | Dan Taylor | Shot put | 2nd | |
| Men's | 2004 Outdoor | Dan Taylor | Hammer throw | 3rd | |
| Women's | 2004 Outdoor | Rosalind Goodwin | Triple jump | 6th | |
| Women's | 2004 Outdoor | Amarachi Ukabam | Discus throw | 6th | |
| Women's | 2004 Outdoor | Keturah Lofton | Hammer throw | 8th | |
| Men's | 2005 Outdoor | Marios Iacovou | High jump | 7th | |
| Women's | 2005 Outdoor | Rosalind Goodwin | Triple jump | 5th | |
| Men's | 2006 Indoor | Brian Olinger | 5000 meters | 7th | |
| Women's | 2006 Indoor | Jessica Stringer | High jump | 5th | |
| Women's | 2006 Indoor | Janine Zylinski | Shot put | 6th | |
| Women's | 2006 Indoor | Keturah Lofton | Weight throw | 8th | |
| Men's | 2006 Outdoor | Brian Olinger | 3000 meters steeplechase | 5th | |
| Women's | 2007 Indoor | Jenna Harris | 400 meters | 8th | |
| Women's | 2007 Indoor | Veronica Jatsek | Weight throw | 7th | |
| Women's | 2007 Outdoor | Veronica Jatsek | Hammer throw | 7th | |
| Men's | 2008 Indoor | Jeff See | Mile run | 7th | |
| Women's | 2008 Indoor | Veronica Jatsek | Weight throw | 4th | |
| Men's | 2008 Outdoor | Jeff See | 1500 meters | 5th | |
| Women's | 2008 Outdoor | Jenna Griffin | 400 meters | 7th | |
| Women's | 2008 Outdoor | Chandra Krempel | 4 × 400 meters relay | 6th | |
| Women's | 2008 Outdoor | Ayrizanna Favours | 4 × 400 meters relay | 6th | |
| Women's | 2008 Outdoor | Ashley Caldwell | 4 × 400 meters relay | 6th | |
| Women's | 2008 Outdoor | Jenna Griffin | 4 × 400 meters relay | 6th | |
| Men's | 2009 Outdoor | Thomas Murdaugh | 400 meters | 7th | |
| Men's | 2009 Outdoor | Jeff See | 1500 meters | 8th | |
| Men's | 2010 Indoor | Jeff See | Mile run | 6th | |
| Women's | 2010 Indoor | Christina Clemons | 60 meters hurdles | 7th | |
| Men's | 2010 Outdoor | Jeff See | 1500 meters | 5th | |
| Men's | 2010 Outdoor | Matt Dechant | Shot put | 8th | |
| Women's | 2010 Outdoor | Maggie Mullen | Javelin throw | 8th | |
| Women's | 2011 Indoor | Letecia Wright | 60 meters hurdles | 5th | |
| Women's | 2011 Outdoor | Christina Clemons | 100 meters hurdles | 2nd | |
| Women's | 2011 Outdoor | Letecia Wright | 100 meters hurdles | 5th | |
| Men's | 2012 Indoor | Thomas Murdaugh | 400 meters | 7th | |
| Men's | 2012 Indoor | Antonio Blanks | 4 × 400 meters relay | 5th | |
| Men's | 2012 Indoor | Korbin Smith | 4 × 400 meters relay | 5th | |
| Men's | 2012 Indoor | Marvel Brooks | 4 × 400 meters relay | 5th | |
| Men's | 2012 Indoor | Thomas Murdaugh | 4 × 400 meters relay | 5th | |
| Men's | 2012 Indoor | Cory Leslie | Distance medley relay | 8th | |
| Men's | 2012 Indoor | Korbin Smith | Distance medley relay | 8th | |
| Men's | 2012 Indoor | Dan White | Distance medley relay | 8th | |
| Men's | 2012 Indoor | Chris Fallon | Distance medley relay | 8th | |
| Men's | 2012 Indoor | Matt Dechant | Shot put | 8th | |
| Women's | 2012 Indoor | Christina Clemons | 60 meters | 5th | |
| Women's | 2012 Indoor | Christina Clemons | 60 meters hurdles | 1st | |
| Men's | 2012 Outdoor | Antonio Blanks | 400 meters hurdles | 7th | |
| Men's | 2012 Outdoor | Cory Leslie | 3000 meters steeplechase | 3rd | |
| Men's | 2012 Outdoor | Matt Dechant | Shot put | 5th | |
| Women's | 2012 Outdoor | Christina Clemons | 100 meters hurdles | 1st | |
| Women's | 2012 Outdoor | Christienne Linton | 4 × 100 meters relay | 5th | |
| Women's | 2012 Outdoor | Christina Clemons | 4 × 100 meters relay | 5th | |
| Women's | 2012 Outdoor | Aisha Cavin | 4 × 100 meters relay | 5th | |
| Women's | 2012 Outdoor | Chesna Sykes | 4 × 100 meters relay | 5th | |
| Men's | 2013 Indoor | Chris Fallon | Mile run | 6th | |
| Women's | 2013 Indoor | Alexis Thomas | Weight throw | 8th | |
| Men's | 2013 Outdoor | Mike Hartfield | Long jump | 3rd | |
| Men's | 2013 Outdoor | Bill Stanley | Javelin throw | 4th | |
| Men's | 2014 Indoor | Donovan Robertson | 60 meters hurdles | 7th | |
| Women's | 2014 Outdoor | Aliyah Everson | 4 × 100 meters relay | 5th | |
| Women's | 2014 Outdoor | Aaliyah Barnes | 4 × 100 meters relay | 5th | |
| Women's | 2014 Outdoor | Chesna Sykes | 4 × 100 meters relay | 5th | |
| Women's | 2014 Outdoor | Ashlee Abraham | 4 × 100 meters relay | 5th | |
| Men's | 2015 Outdoor | Antonio Blanks | 4 × 400 meters relay | 4th | |
| Men's | 2015 Outdoor | Champ Page | 4 × 400 meters relay | 4th | |
| Men's | 2015 Outdoor | Davon Anderson | 4 × 400 meters relay | 4th | |
| Men's | 2015 Outdoor | LaMar Bruton | 4 × 400 meters relay | 4th | |
| Men's | 2015 Outdoor | JC Murasky | Shot put | 7th | |
| Men's | 2016 Indoor | Nick Gray | 200 meters | 6th | |
| Men's | 2016 Indoor | JC Murasky | Shot put | 3rd | |
| Men's | 2016 Outdoor | Nick Gray | 200 meters | 7th | |
| Men's | 2016 Outdoor | Antonio Blanks | 4 × 400 meters relay | 7th | |
| Men's | 2016 Outdoor | Nick Gray | 4 × 400 meters relay | 7th | |
| Men's | 2016 Outdoor | Jerry Jackson | 4 × 400 meters relay | 7th | |
| Men's | 2016 Outdoor | Champ Page | 4 × 400 meters relay | 7th | |
| Men's | 2016 Outdoor | Zack Bazile | Long jump | 8th | |
| Men's | 2017 Indoor | Nicholas Demaline | Shot put | 6th | |
| Women's | 2017 Indoor | Beatrice Hannan | 4 × 400 meters relay | 6th | |
| Women's | 2017 Indoor | Karrington Winters | 4 × 400 meters relay | 6th | |
| Women's | 2017 Indoor | Aaliyah Barnes | 4 × 400 meters relay | 6th | |
| Women's | 2017 Indoor | Maggie Barrie | 4 × 400 meters relay | 6th | |
| Women's | 2017 Indoor | Sade Olatoye | Weight throw | 4th | |
| Men's | 2017 Outdoor | Asa Burke | 4 × 400 meters relay | 7th | |
| Men's | 2017 Outdoor | Nick Gray | 4 × 400 meters relay | 7th | |
| Men's | 2017 Outdoor | Deshawn Marshall | 4 × 400 meters relay | 7th | |
| Men's | 2017 Outdoor | Champ Page | 4 × 400 meters relay | 7th | |
| Men's | 2017 Outdoor | Nicholas Demaline | Shot put | 3rd | |
| Women's | 2017 Outdoor | Maggie Barrie | 4 × 400 meters relay | 8th | |
| Women's | 2017 Outdoor | Karrington Winters | 4 × 400 meters relay | 8th | |
| Women's | 2017 Outdoor | Beatrice Hannan | 4 × 400 meters relay | 8th | |
| Women's | 2017 Outdoor | Aaliyah Barnes | 4 × 400 meters relay | 8th | |
| Men's | 2018 Indoor | Asa Burke | 4 × 400 meters relay | 8th | |
| Men's | 2018 Indoor | Nick Gray | 4 × 400 meters relay | 8th | |
| Men's | 2018 Indoor | Drelan Bramwell | 4 × 400 meters relay | 8th | |
| Men's | 2018 Indoor | Andre Jeff | 4 × 400 meters relay | 8th | |
| Men's | 2018 Indoor | Zack Bazile | Long jump | 4th | |
| Women's | 2018 Indoor | Sade Olatoye | Weight throw | 6th | |
| Men's | 2018 Outdoor | Eric Harrison Jr. | 4 × 100 meters relay | 2nd | |
| Men's | 2018 Outdoor | Duan Asemota | 4 × 100 meters relay | 2nd | |
| Men's | 2018 Outdoor | Drelan Bramwell | 4 × 100 meters relay | 2nd | |
| Men's | 2018 Outdoor | Zack Bazile | 4 × 100 meters relay | 2nd | |
| Men's | 2018 Outdoor | Zack Bazile | Long jump | 1st | |
| Men's | 2018 Outdoor | Nicholas Demaline | Shot put | 8th | |
| Women's | 2018 Outdoor | Karrington Winters | 4 × 400 meters relay | 7th | |
| Women's | 2018 Outdoor | Maggie Barrie | 4 × 400 meters relay | 7th | |
| Women's | 2018 Outdoor | Beatrice Hannan | 4 × 400 meters relay | 7th | |
| Women's | 2018 Outdoor | Syaira Richardson | 4 × 400 meters relay | 7th | |
| Men's | 2019 Indoor | Nick Gray | 200 meters | 4th | |
| Women's | 2019 Indoor | Anavia Battle | 200 meters | 5th | |
| Women's | 2019 Indoor | Julia Rizk | Mile run | 1st | |
| Women's | 2019 Indoor | Sade Olatoye | Shot put | 5th | |
| Women's | 2019 Indoor | Sade Olatoye | Weight throw | 1st | |
| Women's | 2019 Outdoor | Sade Olatoye | Shot put | 3rd | |
| Women's | 2019 Outdoor | Sade Olatoye | Hammer throw | 4th | |
| Women's | 2021 Indoor | Anavia Battle | 200 meters | 5th | |
| Women's | 2021 Indoor | Allie Guagenti | Mile run | 5th | |
| Women's | 2021 Indoor | Adelaide Aquilla | Shot put | 1st | |
| Men's | 2021 Outdoor | Tyler Johnson | 400 meters | 7th | |
| Women's | 2021 Outdoor | Anavia Battle | 200 meters | 3rd | |
| Women's | 2021 Outdoor | Adelaide Aquilla | Shot put | 1st | |
| Women's | 2021 Outdoor | Sade Olatoye | Shot put | 8th | |
| Women's | 2021 Outdoor | Sade Olatoye | Hammer throw | 7th | |
| Women's | 2022 Indoor | Anavia Battle | 200 meters | 3rd | |
| Women's | 2022 Indoor | Adelaide Aquilla | Shot put | 2nd | |
| Men's | 2022 Outdoor | Kentre Patterson | 110 meters hurdles | 6th | |
| Men's | 2022 Outdoor | Tyler Johnson | 400 meters | 8th | |
| Men's | 2022 Outdoor | Hayden Tobias | Shot put | 7th | |
| Women's | 2022 Outdoor | Anavia Battle | 200 meters | 3rd | |
| Women's | 2022 Outdoor | Yanique Dayle | 4 × 100 meters relay | 6th | |
| Women's | 2022 Outdoor | Anavia Battle | 4 × 100 meters relay | 6th | |
| Women's | 2022 Outdoor | Nya Bussey | 4 × 100 meters relay | 6th | |
| Women's | 2022 Outdoor | Leah Bertrand | 4 × 100 meters relay | 6th | |
| Women's | 2022 Outdoor | Adelaide Aquilla | Shot put | 1st | |
| Men's | 2023 Indoor | Clarence Foote-Talley | Triple jump | 4th | |
| Women's | 2023 Indoor | Alyssa Marsh | 4 × 400 meters relay | 8th | |
| Women's | 2023 Indoor | Bryannia Murphy | 4 × 400 meters relay | 8th | |
| Women's | 2023 Indoor | Chanler Robinson | 4 × 400 meters relay | 8th | |
| Women's | 2023 Indoor | Jaydan Wood | 4 × 400 meters relay | 8th | |
| Women's | 2023 Indoor | Adelaide Aquilla | Shot put | 1st | |
| Men's | 2023 Outdoor | Shaun Miller Jr. | High jump | 4th | |
| Men's | 2023 Outdoor | Hayden Tobias | Shot put | 6th | |
| Women's | 2023 Outdoor | Yanique Dayle | 4 × 100 meters relay | 5th | |
| Women's | 2023 Outdoor | Nya Bussey | 4 × 100 meters relay | 5th | |
| Women's | 2023 Outdoor | Columba Effiong | 4 × 100 meters relay | 5th | |
| Women's | 2023 Outdoor | Leah Bertrand | 4 × 100 meters relay | 5th | |
| Women's | 2023 Outdoor | Bryannia Murphy | 4 × 400 meters relay | 3rd | |
| Women's | 2023 Outdoor | Alyssa Marsh | 4 × 400 meters relay | 3rd | |
| Women's | 2023 Outdoor | Yanique Dayle | 4 × 400 meters relay | 3rd | |
| Women's | 2023 Outdoor | Jaydan Wood | 4 × 400 meters relay | 3rd | |
| Women's | 2024 Outdoor | Leah Bertrand | 100 meters | 7th | |
| Women's | 2024 Outdoor | Aniya Mosley | 800 meters | 7th | |

== NCAA individual event champions ==
=== Men ===
- 1921: Pete Stinchcomb – Outdoor Long Jump
- 1925: Ralph Bunker – Outdoor Hammer throw
- 1926: George Guthrie – Outdoor 100 Meter Hurdles
- 1929: George Simpson – Outdoor 100 Meter Dash
- 1929: Dick Rockaway – Outdoor 110 Meter Hurdles
- 1929: George Simpson – Outdoor 200 Meter Dash
- 1929: Peter Rasmus – Outdoor Discus throw
- 1930: George Simpson – Outdoor 200 Meter Dash
- 1931: Jack Keller – Outdoor 220 Yard Hurdles
- 1932: Jack Keller – Outdoor 110 Meter Hurdles
- 1932: Jack Keller – Outdoor 220 Yard Hurdles
- 1935: Jesse Owens – Outdoor 220 Yard Hurdles
- 1935: Jesse Owens – Outdoor 100 Meter Dash
- 1935: Jesse Owens – Outdoor 200 Meter Dash
- 1935: Jesse Owens – Outdoor Long jump
- 1936: Jesse Owens – Outdoor 220 Yard Hurdles
- 1936: Jesse Owens – Outdoor 100 Meter Dash
- 1936: Jesse Owens – Outdoor 200 Meter Dash
- 1936: Charles Beetham – Outdoor 800 Meter Dash
- 1936: Dave Albritton – Outdoor High Jump
- 1936: Mel Walker – Outdoor High Jump
- 1936: Jesse Owens – Outdoor Long Jump
- 1937: Dave Albritton – Outdoor High jump
- 1938: Dave Albritton – Outdoor High jump
- 1941: Robert Wright – Outdoor 220 Yard Hurdles
- 1941: Robert Wright – Outdoor 110 Meter hurdles
- 1942: Robert Wright – Outdoor 220 Yard Hurdles
- 1942: Robert Wright – Outdoor 110 Meter Hurdles
- 1942: Dallas Dupre – Outdoor Long Jump
- 1944: John Schmidt – Outdoor Pole vault
- 1944: Ralph Tyler – Outdoor Long Jump
- 1947: Bill Clifford – Outdoor 800 Meter Dash
- 1948: Mal Whitfield – Outdoor 800 Meter Dash
- 1949: Mal Whitfield – Outdoor 800 Meter Dash
- 1958: Glenn Davis – Outdoor 400 Meter Dash
- 1958: Stan Lyons – Outdoor Pole vault
- 1971: Ray Hupp – Outdoor Decathlon
- 1987: Butch Reynolds – Outdoor 400 Meter Dash
- 1989: Joe Greene – Outdoor Long jump
- 1990: Mark Croghan – Outdoor 3000 Meter Steeplechase
- 1991: Mark Croghan – Outdoor 3000 Meter Steeplechase
- 1993: Chris Nelloms – Indoor 200 Meter Dash
- 1993: Rich Jones – Outdoor 4 × 400 meters relay
- 1993: Chris Nelloms – Outdoor 200 Meter Dash
- 1994: Chris Nelloms – Indoor 200 Meter Dash
- 2004: Dan Taylor – Indoor Shot put
- 2004: Dan Taylor – Indoor Weight throw
- 2018: Zach Bazile – Outdoor Long Jump

=== Women ===
- 1983: Diane Dixon– Indoor 400 Meter Dash
- 2001: Donica Merriman – Indoor 60 Meter Hurdles
- 2001: Donica Merriman – Outdoor 100 Meter Hurdles
- 2012: Christina Clemons – Indoor 60 Meter Hurdles
- 2012: Christina Clemons – Outdoor 100 Meter Hurdles
- 2019: Julia Rizk – Indoor Mile run
- 2019: Sade Olatoye – Indoor Weight throw
- 2021: Adelaide Aquilla – Indoor Shot put
- 2021: Adelaide Aquilla – Outdoor Shot put
- 2022: Adelaide Aquilla – Outdoor Shot put
- 2023: Adelaide Aquilla – Indoor Shot put

== Gold medalist ==
=== List of Ohio State gold medals won by both men and women ===
- 1936: Jesse Owens – 100 Meter Dash
- 1936: Jesse Owens – 200 Meter Dash
- 1936: Jesse Owens – 400 Meter relay
- 1936: Jesse Owens – Long Jump
- 1948: Malvin Whitfield – 800 Meter Dash
- 1948: Malvin Whitfield – Mile relay
- 1952: Malvin Whitfield – 800 Meter Dash
- 1956: Glen Davis – 400 Meter Hurdles
- 1960: Glen Davis – 400 Meter Hurdles
- 1960: Glen Davis – Mile relay
- 1984: Dianne Dixon – Mile run
- 1988: Butch Reynolds – Mile relay

== See also ==
- Category:Ohio State Buckeyes men's track and field athletes (51)
- Category:Ohio State Buckeyes women's track and field athletes (15)
