= Creich =

Creich may refer to:

- Creich, Mull, Argyll and Bute, Scotland
- Creich, Fife, Scotland
- Creich, Sutherland, Highland, Scotland
- Creigh Deeds (born 1958), American lawyer and politician
- Dorothy Weyer Creigh (born 1921–1982), American historian
