= David Plowden =

American photographer (1932–2026)

- Born: October 9, 1932; Boston, Massachusetts, U.S.
- Died: May 4, 2026 (aged 93); Evanston, Illinois, U.S.
- Known for: Photography
- Awards: Guggenheim Fellowship; 1968
- Website: davidplowden.com

David Plowden (October 9, 1932 – May 4, 2026) was an American photographer who made historical documentary photography of urban cities, steam trains, American farmlands, and small towns. He produced 20 books and his work is held in the permanent collections of the Art Institute of Chicago, Beinecke Rare Book and Manuscript Library, Center for Creative Photography, George Eastman House, Library of Congress, Nelson Atkins Museum of Art, and Smithsonian Institution. Plowden was awarded a Guggenheim Fellowship in 1968.

== Early life and education ==
Plowden was born on October 9, 1932, in Boston, and grew up primarily in New York City. After spending time on his family's farm in Putney, Vermont, during summers, he moved there in 1940 and graduated from the Putney School in 1951. As early as age ten or eleven, he began taking photos of the Central Vermont Railway's train coming into Putney. He graduated from Yale College in 1955.

== Career ==
After working for the Great Northern Railway in 1959, he studied photography under Minor White and Nathan Lyons, and was an assistant to O. Winston Link and George Meluso.

Plowden held teaching positions at the Illinois Institute of Technology's Institute of Design (1977-1985), the University of Iowa's School of Journalism (1985-1988), the University of Baltimore's Institute for Publications Design (1990-1991) and Grand Valley State University (1998-1990 and 1991-2007).

In 1995, Plowden agreed to transfer the entire archive of his notes, negatives and prints to the Beinecke Rare Book and Manuscript Library at Yale University at the end of his career.

In 2017, the Milwaukee School of Engineering Grohmann Museum exhibited his Steel: The Cycle of Industry collection and repackaged a photo book of the same name, which chronicles steel from its start as taconite pellet mines in Minnesota to the blast furnaces of Gary, Indiana, and from its shipment across the Great Lakes to the demise of the mills in places like Lackawanna, New York.

Plowden's photographs are characterized by their stark detail. In the steel mill photos, he attributed this to shots he would overexpose and underdevelop. On his subject matter—steam engines, small town Main Streets, steel mills—Plowden said: "I have always felt that I have been standing in the middle ground between two eras, with one eye on the 19th century and the other on the 21st ... all across America we have left abandoned, like carcasses after the feast, that which only yesterday was state-of-the-art invention."

== Selected exhibitions ==
- In 1985, the Chicago Historical Society exhibited 148 of his photos as The Industrial Landscape of Chicago, documenting industrial change from Gary, Indiana to suburban Elk Grove Village, Illinois.
- The Milwaukee School of Engineering's Grohmann Museum hosted several exhibitions of his work, including Requiem for Steam: The Railroad Photographs of David Plowden in 2011, Bridges: The Spans of North America - Photographs by David Plowden in 2013, STEEL: The Cycle of Industry by David Plowden in 2017, David Plowden's Portraits of Work in 2018, and David Plowden: The Architecture of Agriculture in 2023.
- In 2019, Brattleboro Museum and Art Center in Vermont exhibited David Plowden: Bridges.
- In 2024, the Middlebury College Museum of Art exhibited David Plowden: Portraits of America.
- David Plowden’s Iowa opened on the day of his death, May 4, 2026 at the Sioux City Art Center.

== Personal life and death ==
In July 1977, he married Sandra (née Schoellkopf). He lived in Winnetka, Illinois. Plowden died from a heart attack in Evanston, Illinois, on May 4, 2026, at the age of 93.

== Publications ==
=== Publications with photographs and text by Plowden ===
- Farewell to Steam. Stephen Greene Press, 1966.
  - Bonanza Edition, 1968.
- Lincoln and His America. Viking, 1970.
  - Book-of-the-Month Club, 1971. Alternate selection.
- The Hand of Man on America. Smithsonian, 1971.
  - Paperback edition. Chatham, 1973.
  - Second printing. 1974.
- Floor of the Sky: The Great Plains. Sierra Club, 1972. (ISBN 9780871560636)
- Commonplace. E. P. Dutton, 1974.
- Bridges: The Spans of North America. Viking, 1974.
  - Macmillan Book Club, 1975. Alternate selection.
  - Reprinted edition, hardcover, New York City: W. W. Norton, 1984.
  - Reprinted edition, paperback, New York City: W. W. Norton, 1988.
- Tugboat. Macmillan, 1976.
- Steel. Viking, 1981.
- An American Chronology. Viking, 1982. With an introduction by David G. McCullough (ISBN 9780670117192, OL 3510745M)
- Industrial Landscape. New York City: W. W. Norton, 1985,
- A Time of Trains. New York City: W. W. Norton, 1987,
- A Sense of Place. New York City: W. W. Norton, 1988,
- End of an Era: The Last of the Great Lakes Steamboats. New York City: W. W. Norton, 1992,
- Small Town America. Harry N. Abrams, 1994. With an introduction by David G. McCullough,
- Imprints: A Retrospective. Bulfinch, 1997. With an introduction by Alan Trachtenberg.
- Bridges: the Spans of North America. Revised Edition. New York City: W. W. Norton, 2002.
- David Plowden: The American Barn. New York City: W. W. Norton, 2003.
- A Handful of Dust: Disappearing America. New York City: W. W. Norton, 2006.
- David Plowden: Vanishing Point: Fifty Years of Photography. New York City: W. W. Norton, 2007. With an introduction by Steve Edwards.
- Requiem for Steam: The Railroad Photographs of David Plowden. New York City: W. W. Norton, 2010.
- David Plowden’s Iowa. Humanities Iowa, 2012. (ISBN 978-0615578354)
- Heartland: The Plains and The Prairie. New York City: W.W. Norton, 2013.

=== Publications solely containing photographs by Plowden ===
- The Freeway in the City. U.S. Government Printing Office, 1968.
- Wayne County: The Aesthetic Heritage of a Rural Area. Publishing Center for Cultural Resources, 1979. Commissioned by New York State Council for the Arts.
- The States and the Nation series. New York City: W. W. Norton and the American Association for State and Local History, 1977–1981. New Jersey, New York, North Dakota, South Dakota, and Vermont editions.
- A Place of Sense. University of Iowa, 1988.

=== Publications with photographs by Plowden and text co-authored with another ===
- Gems. Viking Press, 1967.
- America the Vanishing. Stephen Greene Press, 1969.
- Nantucket. Viking Press, 1970. Text by Plowden and Patricia Coffin. (ISBN 9780670504114, OL 4467299M, OCLC 1036752786)
- Cape May to Montauk. Viking Press, 1973. Text by Plowden and Nelson P. Falorp.
- Desert and Plain, the Mountains and the River. E.P. Dutton, 1975. Text by Plowden and Berton Roueché.
- The Iron Road. Four Winds Press, 1978. Text by Plowden and with Richard Snow. (ISBN 9780590075237, OCLC 3845075)

== Awards ==
- 1968: Guggenheim Fellowship from the John Simon Guggenheim Memorial Foundation
- 1971: Benjamin Barondess Award for Lincoln and His America
- 1976: American Library Association Notable Children's Books for Tugboat

== Collections ==
Plowden's work is held in the following permanent collections:

- Art Institute of Chicago: 132 prints
- Beinecke Rare Book and Manuscript Library at Yale University: 1800 items
- Center for Creative Photography
- George Eastman House: 188 prints
- Library of Congress, Washington, D.C.: 164 prints
- Nelson Atkins Museum of Art
- Smithsonian Institution, Washington, D.C.
