= Richard J. Jensen =

American historian (born 1941)

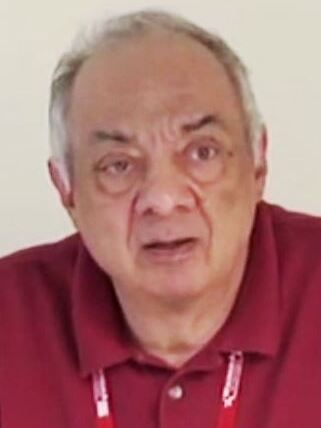
- Jensen in 2012
- Born: Richard Joseph Jensen; October 24, 1941 (age 85); South Bend, Indiana, U.S.

Academic background
- Education: University of Notre Dame (BA); Yale University (MA, PhD)
- Thesis: The Winning of the Midwest: A Social History of Midwestern Elections, 1888–1896 (1966)
- Doctoral advisor: C. Vann Woodward

Academic work
- Discipline: Social history
- Institutions: Washington University in St. Louis; University of Illinois Chicago

Richard Joseph Jensen (born October 24, 1941) is an American historian. He was a professor of history at the University of Illinois, Chicago, from 1973 to 1996. He has worked on American political, social, military, and economic history as well as historiography and quantitative and computer methods. His work focuses on Midwestern electoral history. He authored The Winning of the Midwest and Historian's Guide to Statistics.

== Biography ==
Jensen was born on October 24, 1941, in South Bend, Indiana. He matriculated at the University of Notre Dame, obtaining a B.A. in mathematics in 1962. He then moved to Yale University, where he earned an M.A. in 1965 and a Ph.D. in American studies in 1966. His dissertation, The Winning of the Midwest: A Social History of Midwestern Elections, 1888–1896, was supervised by C. Vann Woodward.

After graduation, Jensen started as assistant professor at Washington University in St. Louis in 1966. In 1970 he moved to the University of Illinois at Chicago, where he became associate professor of history and was professor of history from 1973 to 1996. In 2008 he became a research professor at Montana State University Billings.

He was a visiting professor at the University of Michigan in 1968, Harvard University in 1973, Moscow State University in 1986, and West Point from 1989 to 1990.

From 1971 to 1982 Jensen was also Director of The Family and Community History Center at the Newberry Library. From 1977 to 1982 he was president of the Chicago Metro History Fair. From 1992 to 1997 he was executive director at H-Net. Jensen served on the editorial boards of six scholarly journals, among them The Journal of American History and the American Journal of Sociology.

Jensen was awarded a Woodrow Wilson Fellowship in 1962, a William Robertson Coe fellowship in American history in 1963, and a Boies fellowship in 1965. He received the Rockefeller Foundation/Bellagio (1983), and was a University of Illinois senior scholar (1985–88), a Fulbright Fellow (to the USSR, 1986), and an ACLS senior fellow (1987–88). He received the James Harvey Robinson Prize for teaching from the American Historical Association in 1997.

Jensen was quoted in 2012 as stating that Wikipedia was nearly complete regarding major historical articles. His comments came in the Journal of Military History concerning the Wikipedia article on the War of 1812.

== Work ==
=== The Winning of the Midwest (1966/1971) ===
In The Winning of the Midwest, Jensen tells a social history of elections in the Midwestern United States from 1888 to 1896. He analyzes the role religion played in political conflict, arguing that it had a major influence on party allegiances. Completed in 1966 as his PhD dissertation, the University of Chicago Press published it in 1971. Reviews in the Journal of the Illinois State Historical Society and The Journal of American History praised the work for its broad scope, prose style, and analysis. A review in the Indiana Magazine of History criticised the work for attempting to tackle too broad a subject area and questioned Jensen's use of evidence to ascertain religious preferences. It is his most widely cited work.

=== Historian's Guide to Statistics (1971) ===
In 1971, Jensen co-authored the Historian's Guide to Statistics with Charles Dollar. The book became one of the most widely used guides to interpreting historical statistics.

=== Illinois: A Bicentennial History (1978) ===
In 1978, Jensen's Illinois: A Bicentennial History was published by Norton, New York in its States and the Nation series. The work presents Illinois' history as that of a conflict between the state's original traditionalist settlers and later modernist immigrants. In a 1979 book review in the Indiana Magazine of History, Martin Ridge praised the work for having a higher level of academic rigor than the other books of the series. While recommending it as "in many ways [...] the best interpretative one-volume state history around," he claimed that its arguments are ultimately "unconvincing." Writing in the Journal of the Illinois State Historical Society John Hoffman described the work as "a balanced account of the state, keeping Chicago in proportion to downstate, and the whole in alignment with American history—as 'a' microcosm of the Union, not 'the' microcosm...his Illinois is not Chicago writ large or America writ small. For state history, that is no mean achievement.

=== H-Net ===
H-Net, short for "Humanities & Social Sciences Online", is an interdisciplinary forum for scholars in the humanities and social sciences. It began in 1992 as an initiative by Jensen at the History department at the University of Illinois at Chicago to assist historians "to easily communicate current research and teaching interests; to discuss new approaches, methods and tools of analysis; to share information on access to library catalogs and other electronic databases; and to test new ideas and share comments on current historiography." The network grew rapidly, growing from approximately 6,000 subscribers in 1993 to more than 51,000 by 1997.

In 1997 H-Net won the American Historical Association's James Harvey Robinson Prize, awarded for innovative methods of history teaching. According to the historian Paul Turnbull, under Jensen's leadership—and with funding from the National Endowment for the Humanities—H-Net "rapidly became a forum attracting both historians with established expertise in computer-based quantitative research and younger colleagues interested in exploring the analytical possibilities of hypertext," and "greatly assisted the development of the technical expertise and intellectual ambitions of historians who undertook a remarkable number of Web-based projects through the second half of the 1990s."

In 1994, H-Net began a move to Michigan State University, where historian Mark Kornbluh had secured institutional support. In 1997, Kornbluh and Jensen competed against each other in a "bitterly contested" election for the position of H-Net's executive director, with Jensen arguing that H-Net should be decentralized while Kornbluh advocated consolidation the organization's operations at Michigan State. Kornbluh ultimately won the support of the editors of H-Net's discussion lists.

=== "No Irish Need Apply" (2002) ===
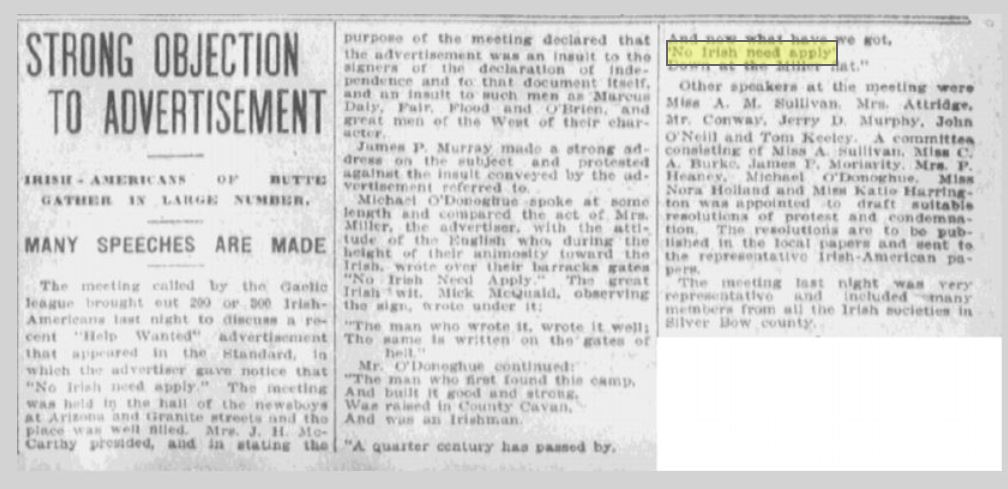
1909 newspaper article concerning "No Irish Need Apply" help-wanted advertisement

Jensen's article about anti-Irish sentiment, "No Irish Need Apply: A Myth of Victimization", was published in the Journal of Social History in December 2002. It argued that "No Irish Need Apply" (NINA) signs were mostly a myth, and that there was "no significant discrimination against the Irish" in the US job market. In July 2015, the same journal published a rebuttal to Jensen's thesis written by Rebecca Fried, an eighth-grade student at Sidwell Friends School in Washington, DC. Before submitting her article for publication, Fried consulted with the historian Kerby A. Miller, who had long disagreed with Jensen's thesis. Miller found her argument to be a worthy, scholarly rebuttal in need of little editing. Fried's paper provided examples of "No Irish Need Apply" in newspaper archives, contesting Jensen's thesis that there was no evidence of the same. The following month, Jensen wrote a rebuttal to her argument for the History News Network.

== Selected publications ==
Jensen has co-authored or edited 21 scholarly or popular books and written 45 scholarly articles.

- Jensen, Richard J. The Winning of the Midwest: Social and Political Conflict, 1888–1896. U of Chicago Press 1971.
- Jensen, Richard J. Historian's Guide to Statistics: Quantitative Analysis and Historical Research. 1971.
- Jensen, Richard J. Illinois: A Bicentennial History. Norton, 1978.
- Jensen, Richard J.; Jon Thares Davidann; Yoneyuki Sugita (2003). Trans-Pacific Relations: America, Europe, and Asia in the Twentieth Century. Greenwood Publishing Group. ISBN 978-0-275-97714-6.
- Smith, J. Douglas, and Richard J. Jensen. World War Two on the Web. 2nd edition, Rowman & Littlefield, World War Two on the Web.
- Carter, Alice E., and Richard J. Jensen. The Civil War on the Web: A Guide to the Very Best Sites. Rowman & Littlefield, 2003.
- Jensen, Richard (1980). "On Modernizing Frederick Jackson Turner: The Historiography of Regionalism". The Western Historical Quarterly. 11 (3): 307–322. doi:10.2307/967565. JSTOR 967565.
- Jensen, Richard J. (1984). "Historiography of American Political History". In Greene, Jack (ed.). Encyclopedia of American Political History. Vol. 1. New York: Scribner's. pp. 1–25.
- Jensen, Richard (July 1984). "Six Sciences of American Politics". Historical Methods: A Journal of Quantitative and Interdisciplinary History. 17 (3): 108–117. doi:10.1080/01615440.1984.10594126.
- Jensen, Richard J (2002). "'No Irish Need Apply': A Myth of Victimization". Journal of Social History. 36 (2): 405–429. doi:10.1353/jsh.2003.0021. S2CID 145258998. Project MUSE 37817.
- Jensen, Richard (2012). "Military History on the Electronic Frontier: Wikipedia Fights the War of 1812" (PDF). The Journal of Military History. 76 (4): 523–556. Archived from the original on December 3, 2017.
