= 1982 AIAW Division I Outdoor Track and Field Championships =

U.S. women's athletics collegiate championship event

- Dates: May 27–29, 1982
- Host city: College Station, Texas; Texas A&M University
- Venue: Kyle Field
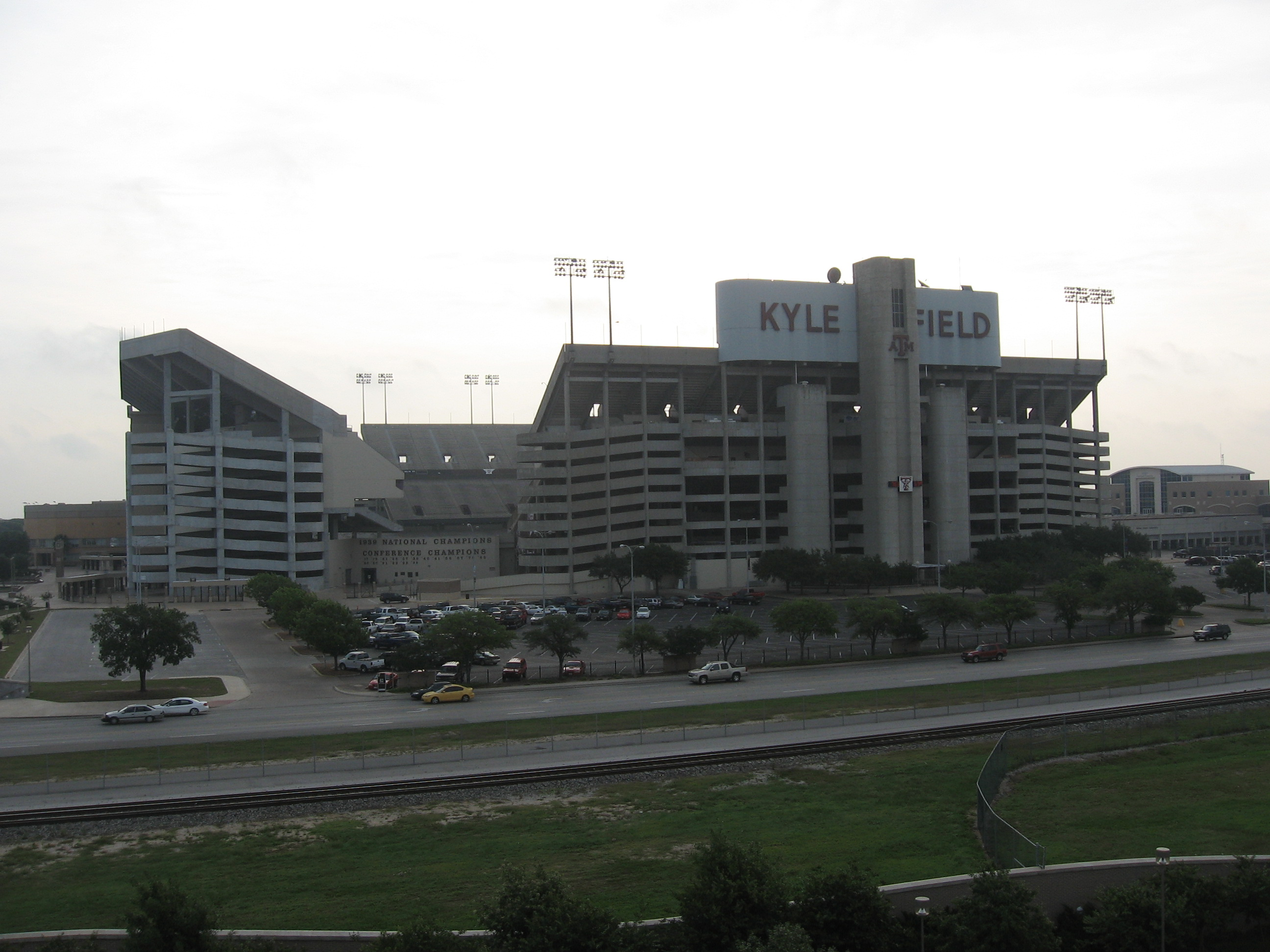

The 1982 AIAW Division I Outdoor Track And Field Championships were the 14th annual Association for Intercollegiate Athletics for Women-sanctioned track meet to determine the individual and team national champions of women's collegiate outdoor track and field events in the United States. They were contested May 27−29, 1982 in College Station, Texas by host University of Texas at Austin. The 1982 edition was the final AIAW track and field championship, as beginning that year women's track and field championships were added to the National Collegiate Athletic Association.

The first women's 1982 NCAA Division I Outdoor Track and Field Championships were held just two days later, preventing some teams from taking part. Lamar University's Midde Hamrin was called the outstanding performer of the meet for winning the 5000 m and 10,000 m. The University of Texas at Austin won the team title by 38 points over the University of California at Berkeley.

== Team standings ==
- Scoring: 10 points for a 1st-place finish, 8 points for 2nd, 6 points for 3rd, 4 points for 4th, 2 points for 5th, and 1 point for 6th, with points split between ties. Top 10 teams shown.

Rank	Team	Points
1st place, gold medalist(s)	Texas Longhorns	82
2nd place, silver medalist(s)	California Golden Bears	44
3rd place, bronze medalist(s)	Wisconsin Badgers	42.5
4th	Purdue Boilermakers	42
5th	Michigan Wolverines	35
6th	Lamar Lady Cardinals	30
7th	Iowa State Cyclones	26
8th	Florida Gators	24
9th	BYU Cougars	23
10th	Iowa Hawkeyes	21
10th	Texas A&M Aggies	21

== Results ==
- Only known results of finals are shown

100 m (+1.9 m/s)
Pl.	Name	Team	Mark
1st place, gold medalist(s)	Colleen Hanna	Iowa State Cyclones	11.73
2nd place, silver medalist(s)	Susan Shurr	Texas Longhorns	11.83
3rd place, bronze medalist(s)	Novaita Samuels	Texas A&M Aggies	11.85
4th	Sharon McDonald	North Texas Mean Green	11.86
5th	Sybil Perry	Purdue Boilermakers	11.89
6th	Veronica Walker	Georgia Bulldogs	12.02

200 m (+0.9 m/s)
Pl.	Name	Team	Mark
1st place, gold medalist(s)	Merry Johnson	West Texas A&M Buffaloes	23.57
2nd place, silver medalist(s)	Novaita Samuels	Texas A&M Aggies	23.62
3rd place, bronze medalist(s)	Donithy Jones	Ohio State Buckeyes	23.76
4th	Susan Shurr	Texas Longhorns	23.79
5th	Colleen Hanna	Iowa State Cyclones	23.95
6th	Sybil Perry	Purdue Boilermakers	24.05
7th	Kimberly White	California Golden Bears	24.07
8th	Sharon McDonald	North Texas Mean Green	24.11

400 m
Pl.	Name	Team	Mark
1st place, gold medalist(s)	Merry Johnson	West Texas A&M Buffaloes	52.34
2nd place, silver medalist(s)	Robbin Coleman	Texas Longhorns	52.66
3rd place, bronze medalist(s)	Donithy Jones	Ohio State Buckeyes	53.61
4th	Barbara Wells	Iowa State Cyclones	53.73
5th	Denise Bullocks	Iowa State Cyclones	53.86
6th	Lori McCauley	Rutgers Scarlet Knights	54.30
7th	Ella Smith	North Texas Mean Green	55.65
8th	Susan Bean	Texas Longhorns	55.9

800 m
Pl.	Name	Team	Mark
1st place, gold medalist(s)	Louise Romo	California Golden Bears	2:04.39
2nd place, silver medalist(s)	Doriane Lambelet-McClive	Cornell Big Red	2:04.27
3rd place, bronze medalist(s)	Kay Stormo	Iowa Hawkeyes	2:05.79
4th	Tara Arnold	Texas Longhorns	2:07.13
5th	Maryann Brunner	Wisconsin Badgers	2:08.10
6th	Marian Kidd	Indiana State Sycamores	2:08.6
7th	Florence Walker	Texas Longhorns	2:10.3
8th	Aisling Molloy	BYU Cougars	2:15.8

1500 m
Pl.	Name	Team	Mark
1st place, gold medalist(s)	Rose Thomson	Wisconsin Badgers	4:18.78
2nd place, silver medalist(s)	Andrea Marek	Purdue Boilermakers	4:19.85
3rd place, bronze medalist(s)	Sueann Fredrick	Michigan Wolverines	4:20.99
4th	Margaret Spotts	California Golden Bears	4:21.66
5th	Mary Jeanne Barrett	Harvard Crimson	4:25.60
6th	Wren Schafer	Iowa State Cyclones	4:25.78
7th	Alice Trumbly	California Golden Bears	4:26.36
8th	Debbie Schulte	Princeton Tigers	4:27.2

3000 m
Pl.	Name	Team	Mark
1st place, gold medalist(s)	Andrea Marek	Purdue Boilermakers	9:16.18
2nd place, silver medalist(s)	Margaret Wynne	Yale Bulldogs	9:17.20
3rd place, bronze medalist(s)	Cathy Branta	Wisconsin Badgers	9:18.0
4th	Wendy Van Mierlo	Illinois State Redbirds	9:20.0
5th	Lisa Larsen	Michigan Wolverines	9:30.03
6th	Jodi Hershberger	Iowa Hawkeyes	9:38.39
7th	Robin Wolfe	Colorado State Rams	9:42.43
8th	Lynn Jennings	Princeton Tigers	9:47.05
9th	Jenny Spangler	Iowa Hawkeyes	9:47.3
10th	Janell Neeley	BYU Cougars	9:47.3

5000 m
Pl.	Name	Team	Mark
1st place, gold medalist(s)	Midde Hamrin	Lamar Lady Cardinals	16:03.75
2nd place, silver medalist(s)	Wendy Van Mierlo	Illinois State Redbirds	16:12.81
3rd place, bronze medalist(s)	Carey May	BYU Cougars	16:14.18
4th	Nan Doak	Iowa Hawkeyes	16:39.00
5th	Alana McCarthy	Purdue Boilermakers	16:41.55
6th	Patsy Sharples	Idaho Vandals	16:46.33
7th	Ann Henderson	Cleveland State Vikings	17:12.08

10,000 m (Note: Places 11 to 13, 16 to 20 not listed)
Pl.	Name	Team	Mark
1st place, gold medalist(s)	Midde Hamrin	Lamar Lady Cardinals	33:37.68
2nd place, silver medalist(s)	Beth Farmer	Florida Gators	34:46.49
3rd place, bronze medalist(s)	Marianne Dickerson	Illinois Fighting Illini	34:49.00
4th	Kim Bird	East Tennessee State Buccaneers	34:53.80
5th	Jenny Spangler	Iowa Hawkeyes	35:01.33
6th	Christine Reid	Western Illinois Leathernecks	35:10.16
7th	Marilee Matheny	Texas A&M Aggies	35:33.5
8th	Margaret Davis	Iowa State Cyclones	36:03.2
9th	Bridgette Baker	Montana Lady Griz	36:05.2
10th	Melanie Weaver	Michigan Wolverines	36:05.5
14th	Amy Laffoon	Idaho State Bengals	37:20.1
15th	Beth Sheridan	Ohio State Buckeyes	37:21.0
21st	Maria Tilman	Arkansas Razorbacks	39:01.1

100 m hurdles (+0.9 m/s)
Pl.	Name	Team	Mark
1st place, gold medalist(s)	Lori Dianello	Florida Gators	13.48
2nd place, silver medalist(s)	Lorna Russell	Purdue Boilermakers	13.65
3rd place, bronze medalist(s)	Danette Onyemelukwe	Western Illinois Leathernecks	13.47
4th	Glenda Tresdale	Temple Owls	14.06
5th	Raquel Williams	Purdue Boilermakers	14.10
6th	Antoinette Jackson	Ohio State Buckeyes	14.11
7th	Kathy Borgwarth	Wisconsin Badgers	14.20
8th	Kelley Mathews	Iowa State Cyclones	14.34

400 m hurdles
Pl.	Name	Team	Mark
1st place, gold medalist(s)	Edna Brown	Temple Owls	57.17
2nd place, silver medalist(s)	Patricia Melton	Yale Bulldogs	57.86
3rd place, bronze medalist(s)	Val Morgan	Georgia Bulldogs	58.16
4th	Colleen Williams	Idaho Vandals	58.94
5th	Konnie Mackey	Colorado State Rams	59.25
6th	Stella Edwinson	BYU Cougars	59.28
7th	Sally Andersen	Princeton Tigers	59.55
8th	Kelley Mathews	Iowa State Cyclones	1:01.79

4 × 100 m relay
Pl.	Name	Team	Mark
1st place, gold medalist(s)	Hollie Denny	Texas Longhorns	46.04
1st place, gold medalist(s)	Donna Sherfield	Texas Longhorns	46.04
1st place, gold medalist(s)	Susan Bean	Texas Longhorns	46.04
1st place, gold medalist(s)	Susan Shurr	Texas Longhorns	46.04
2nd place, silver medalist(s)		Arkansas Razorbacks	46.10
3rd place, bronze medalist(s)		Georgia Bulldogs	46.17
4th		Michigan Wolverines	46.58
5th		Texas A&M Aggies	46.61
6th		Western Illinois Leathernecks	47.01

4 × 400 m relay
Pl.	Name	Team	Mark
1st place, gold medalist(s)	Donna Sherfield	Texas Longhorns	3:37.66
1st place, gold medalist(s)	Florence Walker	Texas Longhorns	3:37.66
1st place, gold medalist(s)	Susan Bean	Texas Longhorns	3:37.66
1st place, gold medalist(s)	Robbin Coleman	Texas Longhorns	3:37.66
2nd place, silver medalist(s)	Louise Romo	California Golden Bears	3:40.08
2nd place, silver medalist(s)	Connie Culbert	California Golden Bears	3:40.08
2nd place, silver medalist(s)	Kimberly White	California Golden Bears	3:40.08
2nd place, silver medalist(s)	Sally Meinbress	California Golden Bears	3:40.08
3rd place, bronze medalist(s)		Iowa State Cyclones	3:40.57
4th		Texas A&M Aggies	3:41.63
5th		Princeton Tigers	3:42.37
6th		Western Illinois Leathernecks	3:42.56

4 × 800 m relay
Pl.	Name	Team	Mark
1st place, gold medalist(s)	Sharon Neugebauer	Texas Longhorns	
1st place, gold medalist(s)	Robbin Coleman	Texas Longhorns	
1st place, gold medalist(s)	Florence Walker	Texas Longhorns	
1st place, gold medalist(s)	Sara Arnold	Texas Longhorns	
2nd place, silver medalist(s)	Ellen Olson	Wisconsin Badgers	8:39.71
2nd place, silver medalist(s)	Sue Beischel	Wisconsin Badgers	8:39.71
2nd place, silver medalist(s)	Maryann Brunner	Wisconsin Badgers	8:39.71
2nd place, silver medalist(s)	Rose Thomson	Wisconsin Badgers	8:39.71
3rd place, bronze medalist(s)	Jymette Bonnivier	Purdue Boilermakers	8:42.21
3rd place, bronze medalist(s)	Becky Cotta	Purdue Boilermakers	8:42.21
3rd place, bronze medalist(s)	Jean Molohon	Purdue Boilermakers	8:42.21
3rd place, bronze medalist(s)	Nancy Sanford	Purdue Boilermakers	8:42.21
4th	Lori McCauley	Rutgers Scarlet Knights	8:46.68
4th	Kathleen Tisdale	Rutgers Scarlet Knights	8:46.68
4th	Cheryl Coleman	Rutgers Scarlet Knights	8:46.68
4th	Terry Dembek	Rutgers Scarlet Knights	8:46.68
5th	Cheryl Ward	Illinois Fighting Illini	8:47.53
5th	Veegee Elsen	Illinois Fighting Illini	8:47.53
5th	Margaret Vogel	Illinois Fighting Illini	8:47.53
5th	Gretchen Grier	Illinois Fighting Illini	8:47.53
6th		Arkansas Razorbacks	8:48.24

Sprint medley relay (Note: Held at a total distance of 800 m, with the first two legs running 100 m, the third leg running 200 m, and the anchor leg running 400 m.)
Pl.	Name	Team	Mark
1st place, gold medalist(s)	Hollie Denny	Texas Longhorns	1:39.92
1st place, gold medalist(s)	Donna Sherfield	Texas Longhorns	1:39.92
1st place, gold medalist(s)	Susan Shurr	Texas Longhorns	1:39.92
1st place, gold medalist(s)	Robbin Coleman	Texas Longhorns	1:39.92
2nd place, silver medalist(s)	Donna Thomas	North Texas Mean Green	1:42.20
2nd place, silver medalist(s)	Anita Whitley	North Texas Mean Green	1:42.20
2nd place, silver medalist(s)	Sharon McDonald	North Texas Mean Green	1:42.20
2nd place, silver medalist(s)	Ella Smith	North Texas Mean Green	1:42.20
3rd place, bronze medalist(s)	Kathy Pannier	Illinois Fighting Illini	1:42.51
3rd place, bronze medalist(s)	Jayne Glade	Illinois Fighting Illini	1:42.51
3rd place, bronze medalist(s)	Rolanda Conda	Illinois Fighting Illini	1:42.51
3rd place, bronze medalist(s)	Gretchen Grier	Illinois Fighting Illini	1:42.51
4th	Lori McCauley	Rutgers Scarlet Knights	1:42.98
4th	Andrea Patterson	Rutgers Scarlet Knights	1:42.98
4th	Terry Dembek	Rutgers Scarlet Knights	1:42.98
4th	Jeanne Taormina	Rutgers Scarlet Knights	1:42.98
5th		Michigan Wolverines	1:43.01
6th	Heidi Hackel	Purdue Boilermakers	1:43.55
6th	Sybil Perry	Purdue Boilermakers	1:43.55
6th	Lorna Russell	Purdue Boilermakers	1:43.55
6th	Maria Williams	Purdue Boilermakers	1:43.55

High jump
Pl.	Name	Team	Mark
1st place, gold medalist(s)	Carolyn Ford	Lamar Lady Cardinals	6 ft 0 1/2 in (1.84 m)
2nd place, silver medalist(s)	Maria Zanandrea	BYU Cougars	5 ft 10 in (1.77 m)
3rd place, bronze medalist(s)	Melinda Morris	Western Illinois Leathernecks	5 ft 8 in (1.72 m)
3rd place, bronze medalist(s)	Joann Bullard	Michigan Wolverines	5 ft 8 in (1.72 m)
5th	Margaret Woods	Purdue Boilermakers	5 ft 8 in (1.72 m)
6th	Candy Cashell	Utah State Aggies	5 ft 8 in (1.72 m)
6th	Cheri Essman	Wisconsin Badgers	5 ft 8 in (1.72 m)
8th	Kathy Raugust	California Golden Bears	5 ft 8 in (1.72 m)

Long jump
Pl.	Name	Team	Mark
1st place, gold medalist(s)	Pat Johnson	Wisconsin Badgers	21 ft 4 3/4 in (6.52 m)
2nd place, silver medalist(s)	Donna Thomas	North Texas Mean Green	21 ft 0 in (6.4 m)
3rd place, bronze medalist(s)	Kathy Rankins	Georgia Bulldogs	20 ft 8 3/4 in (6.31 m)
4th	Kim Schofield	Florida Gators	20 ft 8 1/2 in (6.31 m)
5th	Becky Jo Kaiser	Illinois Fighting Illini	20 ft 7 3/4 in (6.29 m)
6th	Sharon Moultrie	Texas Tech Red Raiders	20 ft 7 in (6.27 m)
7th	Wendy Winters	Western Illinois Leathernecks	19 ft 9 1/2 in (6.03 m)
8th	Jane Mattke	Minnesota Golden Gophers	19 ft 8 3/4 in (6.01 m)

Shot put
Pl.	Name	Team	Mark
1st place, gold medalist(s)	Sandy Burke	Northeastern Huskies	52 ft 2 3/4 in (15.91 m)
2nd place, silver medalist(s)	Oneithea Davis	St. John's Red Storm	50 ft 9 3/4 in (15.48 m)
3rd place, bronze medalist(s)	Early Douglas	Texas Tech Red Raiders	49 ft 5 3/4 in (15.08 m)
4th	Sharon Mitnik	Temple Owls	49 ft 3 1/4 in (15.01 m)
5th	Jackie Bland	East Tennessee State Buccaneers	48 ft 9 1/2 in (14.87 m)
6th	Gail Koziara	Dartmouth Big Green	47 ft 8 3/4 in (14.54 m)
7th	Jo Beth Palmer	Texas Longhorns	48 ft 1 3/4 in (14.67 m)
8th	Karen Nitsch	Wisconsin Badgers	47 ft 9 in (14.55 m)

Discus throw
Pl.	Name	Team	Mark
1st place, gold medalist(s)	Penny Neer	Michigan Wolverines	183 ft 0 in (55.77 m)
2nd place, silver medalist(s)	Julie Ann Jones	BYU Cougars	168 ft 10 in (51.46 m)
3rd place, bronze medalist(s)	Nadine Cox	Ohio State Buckeyes	162 ft 9 in (49.6 m)
4th	Pat Herrington	Idaho State Bengals	162 ft 5 in (49.5 m)
5th	Jo Beth Palmer	Texas Longhorns	160 ft 5 in (48.89 m)
6th	Vickilee Cobern	Texas A&M Aggies	153 ft 8 in (46.83 m)

Javelin throw
Pl.	Name	Team	Mark
1st place, gold medalist(s)	Lori Kokkola	Texas Longhorns	170 ft 9 in (52.04 m)
2nd place, silver medalist(s)	Kristen Engle	California Golden Bears	170 ft 7 in (51.99 m)
3rd place, bronze medalist(s)	Debra Williams	Michigan Wolverines	167 ft 6 in (51.05 m)
4th	Mary Chrobak	Texas Longhorns	156 ft 0 in (47.54 m)
5th	Nancy Raczka	Florida Gators	154 ft 2 in (46.99 m)
6th	Melanie Heitman	Iowa State Cyclones	154 ft 1 in (46.96 m)

Heptathlon
Pl.	Name	Team	Mark
1st place, gold medalist(s)	Kathy Raugust	California Golden Bears	5514 pts
2nd place, silver medalist(s)	Kathy Gillespie	Iowa Hawkeyes	5384 pts
3rd place, bronze medalist(s)	Kathy Borgwarth	Wisconsin Badgers	5286 pts
4th	Chris Viguie	California Golden Bears	5161 pts
5th	Denise Armstrong	Texas Longhorns	5002 pts
6th	Jan Wacaser	Illinois Fighting Illini	4954 pts

== See also ==
- Association for Intercollegiate Athletics for Women championships § Outdoor track and field
- 1982 AIAW Indoor Track and Field Championships
- 1982 NCAA Division I Outdoor Track and Field Championships
