= Kerby A. Miller =

American historian (born 1944)

- Born: Kerby Alonzo Miller; December 30, 1944 (age 81); Phoenix, Arizona, US

Academic background
- Education: Pomona College; University of California, Berkeley
- Thesis: Emigrants and Exiles (1976)

Academic work
- Discipline: History
- Sub-discipline: American history
- Institutions: University of Missouri
- Main interests: History of Irish Americans

Kerby Alonzo Miller (born December 30, 1944) is an American historian and emeritus professor at University of Missouri. He is known for his works on Irish immigration to and identity in the United States.

== Life ==
Miller graduated from Pomona College, and from University of California, Berkeley, with an MA and PhD in 1976. He is a visiting researcher at Queen's University Belfast.

He has argued extensively that historian Richard J. Jensen's claims about anti-Irish sentiment in America were inaccurate.

Miller collected and transcribed over decades hundreds of letters from Irish immigrants in America. The letters range in date from the late 1600s to the 1950s. He deposited transcripts of these letters at the Moore Institute, University of Galway to be made available on a searchable database, Imirce.

== Awards ==
- 1986 Pulitzer Prize in History finalist
- 1986 Theodore Saloutos Award
- 1986 Merle Curti Award from the Organization of American Historians
- 2002 Distinguished Lecturer by the Organization of American Historians
- 2004 James S. Donnelly Prize for Irish Immigrants in the Land of Canaan

== Works ==
=== Chapters ===
- Yans-McLaughlin, Virginia (1990). "Class, Culture, and Immigrant Group Identity in the United States". In Virginia Yans-McLaughlin (ed.). Immigration reconsidered: history, sociology, and politics. Oxford University Press. p. 96. ISBN 978-0-19-505510-8.
- Dermot Keogh; Michael H. Haltzel, eds. (1993). "Revising Revisionism: Comments and Reflections". Northern Ireland and the Politics of Reconciliation. Cambridge University Press. p. 52. ISBN 978-0-521-45933-4.
- Charles Fanning, ed. (2000). "'Scotch-Irish' Myths and 'Irish' Identities in Eighteenth and Nineteenth Century America". New perspectives on the Irish diaspora. SIU Press. ISBN 978-0-8093-2344-9.
- Kerby A. Miller; Bruce D. Bolling; Liam Kennedy (2003). "The Famine's Scars: William Murphy's Ulster, and American Odyssey". In Kevin Kenny (ed.). New directions in Irish-American history. University of Wisconsin Press. ISBN 978-0-299-18714-9.
- Margaret M. Mulrooney, ed. (2003). "In the Famine's Shadow: An Irish Immigrant from West Kerry to South Dakota, 1881–1979". Fleeing the famine: North America and Irish refugees, 1845-1851. Greenwood Publishing Group. ISBN 978-0-275-97670-5.

=== Books ===
- Ireland and Irish America: Culture, Class, and Transatlantic Migration. Field Day Publications. 2008. ISBN 978-0-946755-39-4.
- Kerby A. Miller, ed. (2003). Irish Immigrants in the Land of Canaan: Letters and Memoirs from Colonial and Revolutionary America, 1675-1815. New York: Oxford University Press. ISBN 978-0-19-515489-4.
- Kerby A. Miller; Patricia Mulholland Miller (2001). Journey of Hope: The Story of Irish Immigration to America. San Francisco: Chronicle. ISBN 978-0-8118-2783-6.
- James S. Donnelly; Kerby A. Miller, eds. (1998). Irish Popular Culture, 1650–1850. Dublin: Irish Academic Press. ISBN 978-0-7165-2551-6.
- Out of Ireland: The Story of Irish Emigration to America (Washington, DC, 1994), ISBN 978-1-880216-25-5
- Miller, Kerby A. (1985). Emigrants and Exiles: Ireland and the Irish Exodus to North America. New York: Oxford University Press. ISBN 978-0-19-505187-2. (reprint 1988 ISBN 978-0-19-505187-2)
