= Aaron Payne (sprinter) =

American sprinter (born 1971)

Personal information
- Born: May 16, 1971 (age 55) Louisville, Kentucky, United States

Sport
- Sport: Track and field
Medal record
Representing United States
Summer Universiade
Gold medal – first place	1993 Buffalo	4x400 m relay

Aaron Payne (born May 16, 1971) is an American former sprinter.

Competing for the Ohio State Buckeyes track and field team, Payne won the 1993 4 × 400 meter relay at the NCAA Division I Outdoor Track and Field Championships. Payne also competed for the school's football team.
