= H-Net =

Website for scholars in the humanities and social sciences

- Logo
- Website type: Online-forum for interdisciplinary academic discussion
- Available in: English
- Owner: Michigan State University
- Creator: Richard J. Jensen
- Website: networks.h-net.org
- Commercial: No
- Launched: March 25, 1993; 33 years ago
- v3.0 since 5th July 2023

H-Net ("Humanities & Social Sciences Online") is an interdisciplinary forum for scholars in the humanities and social sciences. One of its functions is to host electronic mailing lists organized by academic disciplines. In 2007, H-Net lists reached 180,000 subscribers from over 160 countries, and in 2025 its website stated there were 230,000 subscribers from over 200 countries.

The H-Net Network has grown until it is now endorsed by many academic professional organizations. Its over 180 topic- or discipline-specific lists are often the primary internet forum for scholars. Individual lists are edited by a team of scholars and each has a board of editors. The Department of History at Michigan State University hosts H-Net.

== Online services ==
In addition to its email lists, H-Net provides three related online services:

- H-Net Reviews is a resource for coordinating book reviews and website reviews from participating lists, preserving them in searchable annual volumes. There are 46,000+ reviews of books and other publications, commissioned and published on its website and through its listservs.
- H-Net Job Guide: academic position announcements, available on its website and through email
- H-Net Academic Announcements: announcements of academic conferences, calls for papers, and programs

== Discussion networks ==
Many of the lists deal with various areas of historical study. Within two years of its founding, Steven A. Leibo in a newsletter post described H-Net as being "among the most dynamic and effective contributions" to the internationalization of scholarship.

== History ==
H-Net began in 1992 as an initiative of Prof. Richard J. Jensen when he was at the History department at the University of Illinois Chicago, to assist historians "to easily communicate current research and teaching interests; to discuss new approaches, methods and tools of analysis; to share information on access to library catalogs and other electronic databases; and to test new ideas and share comments on current historiography." H-net started moving operations to Michigan State in 1994. H-Net is now organized as an international consortium of scholars in the humanities and social sciences and its networks are hosted by Michigan State University.

== See also ==
- hprints - an open access repository for Nordic academic research in the arts and humanities
