= Antoinette Jackson =

American anthropologist

Antoinette T. Jackson

Academic work
- Institutions: University of South Florida
- Notable works: Speaking for the Enslaved—Heritage Interpretation at Antebellum Plantation Sites

Antoinette T. Jackson is Professor and Chair of Anthropology at the University of South Florida (USF) in Tampa. Her research focusses on sociocultural and historical anthropology, the social construction of race, class, gender, ethnicity; heritage resource management, and American, African American and African Diaspora culture.

== Education ==
Jackson studied for a BA in Computer and Information Science at Ohio State University, an MBA at Xavier University. She received a PhD in anthropology from the University of Florida, with her dissertation entitled "African Communities in Southeast Coastal Plantation Spaces in America".

While at Ohio State, Jackson was an All-American hurdler for the Ohio State Buckeyes track and field team, placing 6th in the 100 m hurdles at the 1982 AIAW Division I Outdoor Track and Field Championships.

== Career ==
Jackson published a monograph in 2012 entitled "Speaking for the Enslaved—Heritage Interpretation at Antebellum Plantation Sites", which was described as a "critical intervention in the fields of cultural heritage management, cultural heritage tourism, and cultural preservation".

Jackson was the National Park Service Regional Ethnographer for the SE Region from 2012 to 2016. She is currently associate professor of anthropology at the University of South Florida.

Jackson's most recent book publication, in March 2020, is entitled "Heritage, tourism and race : the other side of leisure"

She is the Director of the USF Heritage Research Lab and the editor of the journal Present Pasts.

== Publications ==
- 2008. Imagining Jehossee Island Rice Plantation Today. International Journal of Heritage Studies 14:2, 131–155, DOI: http://doi.org/10.1080/13527250701855155
- 2010. Changing ideas about heritage and heritage resource management in historically segregated communities. Transforming Archaeology 18(1): 80–92.
- 2011. Shattering Slave Life Portrayals: Uncovering Subjugated Knowledge in U.S. Plantation Sites in South Carolina and Florida. American Anthropologist 113: 448–462. DOI: http://doi.org/10.1111/j.1548-1433.2011.01353.x
- 2011. Diversifying the dialogue post-Katrina—Race, place, and displacement in New Orleans, U.S.A.. Transforming Anthropology 19: 3–16. DOI: http://doi.org/10.1111/j.1548-7466.2011.01109.x
- 2012. Speaking for the Enslaved—Heritage Interpretation at Antebellum Plantation Sites. Routledge.
- 2016. Exhuming the Dead and Talking to the Living: The 1914 Fire at the Florida Industrial School for Boys—Invoking the Uncanny as a Site of Analysis. Anthropology and Humanism 41: 158–177. DOI: http://doi.org/10.1111/anhu.12141
- 2019. Remembering Jim Crow, again – critical representations of African American experiences of travel and leisure at U.S. National Park Sites, International Journal of Heritage Studies 25:7: 671–688. DOI: http://doi.org/10.1080/13527258.2018.1544920
- 2020. Heritage, tourism and race : the other side of leisure. Routledge. New York, NY. doi:10.4324/9781003029014
