= Donica Merriman =

American hurdler

Sport
- Country: United States
- Sport: Track and field
- Event: 100 metres hurdles

Donica Merriman is a retired American track and field athlete competing in hurdling. In 2001, she reached the semi-finals in the women's 100 metres hurdles at the 2001 World Championships in Athletics in Edmonton, Canada.

Competing for the Ohio State Buckeyes track and field team, Merriman won the 2001 NCAA Division I Outdoor Track and Field Championships in the 100 metres hurdles. She was the first Ohio State Buckeyes women's athlete to win an outdoor national championship.
