= Richard Jones (sprinter) =

Guyanese sprinter

Personal information
- Nationality: Guyanese
- Born: 10 December 1973 (age 52)

Sport
- Sport: Sprinting
- Event: 400 metres

Richard Jones (born 10 December 1973), also known as Rich Jones, is a Guyanese sprinter. He competed in the men's 400 metres at the 1996 Summer Olympics.

Competing for the Ohio State Buckeyes track and field team, Jones won the 1993 4 × 400 meter relay at the NCAA Division I Outdoor Track and Field Championships.
