= Daniella Hill =

American athlete (born 1991)

Personal information
- Nickname: Dani
- Born: Daniella Bunch; May 16, 1991 (age 35) Mahomet, Illinois, U.S.
- Height: 6 ft 0 in (1.83 m)

Sport
- Sport: Track and field
- Event: Shot put
- College team: Purdue Boilermakers
- Turned pro: 2014
- Retired: 2019

Achievements and titles
Personal best
Shot put	19.64 m (64 ft 5 in) (2017)
Hammer	58.36 m (191 ft 5 1/2 in) (2014)

Daniella Hill (born Daniella Bunch on May 16, 1991) is an American track and field athlete specializing in throwing events. She is the 2018 United States Indoor Champion in the shot put.

== Professional ==
Dani won the 2018 United States Indoor Championship in shot put. She also competed in 2017 World Outdoor Shot Put and 2018 World Indoor Shot Put.

Hill started as a volunteer coach at Purdue University in 2014 through 2017 and currently serves as a throws assistant coach for men and women throws at Grand Valley State University.

== Personal ==
She married Zack Hill on October 7, 2017. Zack was a former shot putter for Michigan State University.

== NCAA ==
She competed for Purdue University. At the 2014 NCAA Indoor Championships, she scored all of Purdue's team points between the shot put and weight throw. Her 10 points were the most the entire team has scored in 14 years. She was named Big Ten Field Athlete of the Year and Big Ten Field Athlete of the Championships.

== Prep ==
Prior to Purdue, she competed for Mahomet-Seymour High School in Mahomet, Illinois where she won five state championships in the shot put (3 indoors, 2 outdoors).
