= The States and the Nation series =

The States and the Nation series is a book series published in celebration of the United States Bicentennial by W. W. Norton & Company regarding the states of the United States of America. The first volume was published in 1975 and volumes continued to appear until 1984.

== Volumes ==
- Alabama, Virginia Van der Veer Hamilton.
- Alaska, William R. Hunt.
- Arizona, Lawrence Clark Powell.
- Arkansas, Harry S. Ashmore.
- California, David Lavender.
- Colorado, Marshall Sprague.
- Connecticut, David Morris Roth.
- Delaware, Carol E. Hoffecker.
- District of Columbia, David L. Lewis.
- Florida, Gloria Jahoda.
- Georgia, Harold H. Martin.
- Hawaii, Ruth M. Tabrah.
- Idaho, F. Ross Peterson.
- Illinois, Richard J. Jensen.
- Indiana, Howard Henry Peckham.
- Iowa, Joseph Frazier Wall.
- Kansas, Kenneth S. Davis.
- Kentucky, Steven A. Channing.
- Louisiana, Joe Gray Taylor.
- Maine, Charles E. Clark.
- Maryland, Carl Bode.
- Massachusetts, Richard D. Brown.
- Michigan, Bruce Catton.
- Minnesota, William E. Lass.
- Mississippi, John Ray Skates.
- Missouri, Paul C. Nagel.
- Montana, Clark C. Spence.
- Nebraska, Dorothy Weyer Creigh.
- Nevada, Robert Laxalt.
- New Hampshire, Elizabeth Forbes Morison.
- New Jersey, Thomas Fleming.
- New Mexico, Marc Simmons.
- New York, Bruce Bliven.
- North Carolina, William S. Powell.
- North Dakota, Robert P. Wilkins.
- Ohio, Walter Havighurst.
- Oklahoma, H. Wayne Morgan.
- Oregon, Gordon B. Dodds.
- Pennsylvania, Thomas C. Cochran.
- Rhode Island, William McLoughlin.
- South Carolina, Louis B. Wright.
- South Dakota, John R. Milton.
- Tennessee, Wilma Dykeman.
- Texas, Joe B. Frantz.
- Utah, Charles S. Peterson.
- Vermont, Charles T. Morrissey.
- Virginia, Louis D. Rubin, Jr.
- Washington, Norman H. Clark.
- West Virginia, J. A. Williams.
- Wisconsin, Richard Nelson Current.
- Wyoming, T. A. Larson.
