= Serene Ross =

American javelin thrower (born 1977)

Personal information
- Born: October 15, 1977 (age 48) Edinburg, Pennsylvania
- Height: 5 ft 10 in (178 cm)
- Weight: 200 lb (91 kg)

Sport
- Country: USA
- Sport: Athletics
- Event: Javelin throw
- Coached by: John Zera
- Updated on 13 September 2015

Serene Ross (born October 15, 1977) is an American former track and field athlete who competed in the javelin throw. Her personal record of 60.06 m (197 ft 1/2 in) is a former American record for the discipline.

Ross was both United States champion and NCAA champion in the javelin in 2002. She represented her country twice internationally: at the Summer Universiade in 2001 and the IAAF World Cup in 2002.

== Career ==
Born in Edinburg, Pennsylvania, she attended Wilmington Area High School before going on to study sociology at Purdue University between 1997 and 2002. While at college she competed in NCAA competition for the Purdue Boilermakers team, with her first major placing being seventh in the javelin throw at the 1999 NCAA Outdoor Championships.

Ross threw at national level at the 2000 United States Olympic Trials, placing 19th in qualifying. Collegiately, she competed in both javelin and hammer throw events that year. At the NCAA Championships she was 13th in javelin and 18th in hammer. She claimed her first regional title in the hammer throw at the Big Ten Conference championships. Ross moved up the national javelin rankings with a sixth-place finish at the 2001 NCAA Championships, then third place at the 2001 USA Outdoor Track and Field Championships. The latter performance earned her the chance to represent the United States at the 2001 World Championships in Athletics, but she did not achieve the qualifying standard within the time period. Following a new personal record of 54.72 m (179 ft 6 1/4 in) at the USATF Midsummer Classic meet, Ross made her international debut at the 2001 Summer Universiade, where she ended seventh overall. She ranked fourth in the United States that year.

The 2002 season marked the high point of her career. She started the year in the weight throw, taking 15th place at the NCAA Indoor Championships. Outdoors, she focused on the javelin and came third at the Mt. SAC Relays before setting a personal record of 57.30 m (187 ft 11 3/4 in) to win her first Big Ten Conference title in that discipline. She broke the American record in the javelin at the NCAA Outdoor Championships with a throw of 59.64 m (195 ft 8 in). This made her only the second Purdue female athlete to win an NCAA title (after Corissa Yasen's 1996 heptathlon win). She following this up with the first and only national title of her career at the 2002 USA Outdoor Track and Field Championships, improving her own American record to 60.06 m (197 ft 1/2 in) in the process. That record lasted only one month as Kim Kreiner (the runner-up at the national event) threw 60.68 m (199 ft 3/4 in) that July. Ross was selected for the 2002 IAAF World Cup team and duly finished fifth at the event.

Ross gained a professional sponsorship deal with Nike, Inc. but did not compete at a high level in 2003. She returned to competition in 2004 and had a season's best of 57.25 m (187 ft 9 3/4 in). At the 2004 United States Olympic Trials she was the second highest qualifier, but did not improve in the final round and placed fifth with a mark of 53.20 m (174 ft 6 1/4 in). She did not compete at a high level after the 2004 season. As she had not formally retired, she was still under USA Track & Field rules and subsequently failed a doping test in 2006 for two banned diuretics (hydrochlorothiazide and triamterene). She was banned for two years from the sport, although she had not been competing during that period regardless.

After retiring from competition, she went into coaching and became a volunteer assistant coach at her alma mater.

== National titles ==
- USA Outdoor Track and Field Championships
  - Javelin throw: 2002
- NCAA Women's Division I Outdoor Track and Field Championships
  - Javelin throw: 2002

== International competitions ==
Year	Competition	Venue	Position	Notes
2001	Universiade	Beijing, China	7th	51.21 m
2002	IAAF World Cup	Madrid, Spain	5th	56.91 m

== See also ==
- List of doping cases in athletics
