= 1929 NCAA Track and Field Championships =

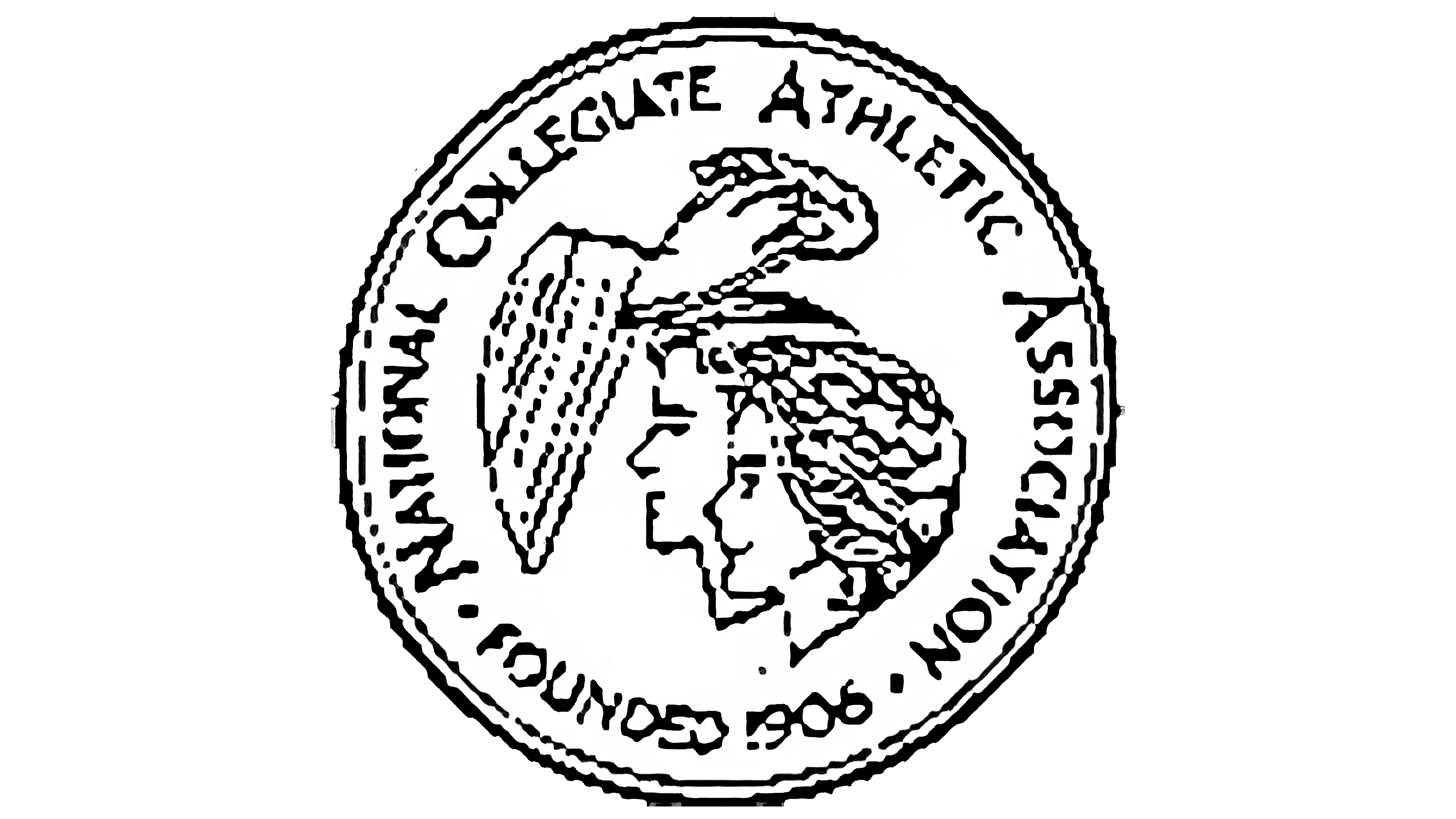
- Team Champion: Ohio State (1st title)
- Edition: 8th
- Dates: June 7-8, 1929
- Host city: (Illinois) Chicago, Illinois; University of Chicago
- Venue: Stagg Field
- Events: 14

The 1929 NCAA Track and Field Championships was the seventh NCAA track and field championship. The meet was held at Stagg Field in Chicago, Illinois in June 1929.

== Team championship ==
1. Ohio St. - 50 points
2. Washington - 42 points
3. Illinois - 35 1/2 points
4. Southern California - 32 points
5. Stanford - 28 points
6. Iowa - 24 points
7. Michigan - 22 points
8. Pittsburgh - 21 points
9. Northwestern - 19 points
10. Chicago - 15 points

== Track events ==
100-yard dash
1. George Simpson, Ohio State - 9.4 seconds (new world record but not ratified)
2. Claude Bracey, Rice Institute
3. Eddie Tolan, Michigan
4. Cy Leland, TCU
5. Jack Elder, Notre Dame
6. Jay Wilcox, Kansas

120-yard high hurdles
1. Richard Rockaway, Ohio St. - 14.7 seconds
2. Lee Sentman, Illinois
3. Stephen Anderson, Washington
4. Robert Rodgers, Illinois
5. Dwight Kane, Ohio Wesleyan
6. Byron Grant, Utah

220-yard dash
1. George Simpson, Ohio St. - 20.8 seconds (new meeting record)
2. Eddie Tolan, Michigan
3. Claude Bracey, Rice Institute
4. Cy Leland, TCU
5. Norm Root, Chicago
6. George "Dee" Hutson, Denison

220-yard low hurdles
1. Stephen Anderson, Washington 23.5
2. Richard Rockaway, Ohio St.
3. Jim Payne, USC
4. Lee Sentman, Illinois
5. Dwight Kane, Ohio Wesleyan
6. Ernie Payne, USC

440-yard dash
1. Rut Walter, Northwestern - 47.9 seconds
2. Riley Williamson, Okla. Baptist
3. Pete Bowen, Pittsburgh
4. Johnny Lewis, College of City of Detroit
5. John Wilson, Warrensburg Teachers College
6. Keith Hursley, Missouri

880-yard run
1. Edwin Genung, Washington - 1:55.0
2. Virgil Gist, Chicago
3. Hal White, Illinois
4. Dale Letts, Chicago
5. Gordon Dodds, Washington
6. Dyle Vaughn, Abilene Christian

One-mile run
1. Wilbur Getz, Alfred College - 4:19.6
2. Orval Martin, Purdue
3. Rufus Kiser, Washington
4. Ralph Hill, Oregon
5. Bob Young, Georgia
6. John Faulkner, Oklahoma A&M

Two-mile run
1. Dave Abbott, Illinois 9:30.0
2. Harold Manning, Wichita
3. Harold Fields, Indiana
4. Rodney Leas, Indiana
5. William Clapham, Indiana
6. Frederick Cope, Mount Union

== Field events ==
Broad jump
1. Ed Gordon, Iowa - 24 feet, 8 1/2 inches
2. Jess Hill, USC
3. Howard Paul, USC
4. Coburn Tomson, Nebraska
5. Frank Simon, Illinois
6. Byron Grant, Utah

High jump
1. Parker Shelby, Oklahoma - 6 feet, 3 inches
2. Ed Gordon, Iowa
3. Charles Brady, Louisville
3. Logan Carter, Oregon Aggies
5. John Russell, Bradley Poly
5. Robert Carr, Illinois
5. D. Davis, Miami
5. Shelby Sanford, Georgia
5. Byron Grant, Utah
5. Cam Hackle, Western Michigan

Pole vault
1. Tom Warne, Northwestern - 13 feet, 8 7/8 inches (new meeting record)
1. Ward Edmonds, Stanford - 13 feet, 8 7/8 inches (new meeting record)
3. Henry Canby, Iowa
3. Victor Pickard, Pittsburgh
5. Jack Williams, USC
5. Verne McDermott, Illinois
5. Harold McAtee, Michigan State

Discus throw
1. Pete Rasmus, Ohio St. 159 feet, 1 7/8 inches (new meeting record)
2. Ed Moeller, Oregon
3. John Anderson, Cornell
4. Paul Jessup, Washington
5. Dan Beattie, Colorado St.
6. Eric Krenz, Stanford

Javelin
1. Jess Mortensen, USC - 203 feet, 7 3/4 inches
2. Marion Hammon, SMU
3. J.G. Floyd, Texas A&M
4. Ted Harpstrite, Millikin
5. Lee Bartlett, Albion College
6. Mel Whitlock, Oregon Aggies

Shot put
1. Harlow Rothert, Stanford - 50 feet, 3 inches (new meeting record)
2. Eric Krenz, Stanford
3. Sam Behr, Wisconsin
4. Paul Jessup, Washington
5. Don Paul, Armour Institute - 46 feet, 11 1/4 inches
6. Charles Weaver, Chicago

Hammer throw
1. Donald Gwinn, Pittsburgh - 163 feet, 9 3/4 inches
2. Wilford Ketz, Michigan
3. Earl Clark, Denver
4. Dan Beattie, Colorado St.
5. Joseph Ujhelyi, Ohio State
6. John Gilchrist, Iowa

== See also ==
- NCAA Men's Outdoor Track and Field Championship
