= Robert Gary =

American track and field athlete

Personal information
- Born: April 5, 1973 (age 53) Westerville, Ohio, United States
- Home town: Evanston, Illinois, United States

Sport
- Sport: Track and field
- Club: Ohio State Buckeyes

Robert Meredith Gary (born April 5, 1973) is a retired American track and field athlete who competed in the 3000 meter steeplechase at the 1996 Summer Olympics and 2004 Summer Olympics.

== Track and field career ==
=== College career ===
Gary ran for the Ohio State Buckeyes where he was a six-time All-American and was a Big Ten Conference champion. Gary graduated from Ohio State in 1996.

=== International career ===
At the 1996 Olympic Trials Gary finished 2nd in the 3,000 meter Steeplechase to qualify for the 1996 Olympics. At the 1996 Olympics, Gary finished 11th in the 1996 Summer Olympics Men's 3000 metres steeplechase heats.

At the 1999 World Team Trials, Gary finished 2nd to qualify for the 1999 World Championships in Athletics where he finished 7th in his heat race.

At the 2003 World Team Trials, Gary finished 3rd to qualify for the 2003 World Championships in Athletics where he finished 12th in his heat race.

At the 2004 Olympic Trials Gary finished 3rd in the 3,000 meter Steeplechase to qualify for the 2004 Olympics. At the 2004 Olympics, Gary finished 12th in the 2004 Summer Olympics – Men's 3000 metres steeplechase heats.

== Cross-Country ==
Gary was an accomplished cross-country runner, winning a national title in 2003 and having two top-3 finishes in 2004 at the national championships. Gary competed in the 1998 and 2004 IAAF World Cross Country Championships.

== Coaching career ==
Gary was the head cross-country coach (1996–2012) and head track and field coach (2006–2012) for the Ohio State Buckeyes. Gary is currently the head track and field and cross-country coach for the Furman Paladins.
