= Dorothy Weyer Creigh =

- Weyer (later Creigh), from the 1940 yearbook of Hastings College
- Born: Dorothy Weyer; December 4, 1921; Hastings, Nebraska, U.S.
- Died: January 2, 1982 (aged 60); Hastings, Nebraska, U.S.
- Occupations: Writer, editor, local historian

Dorothy Weyer Creigh (December 4, 1921 – January 2, 1982) was a writer who specialized in the history of Nebraska. She is listed by Lincoln City Libraries as a significant Nebraska author.

== Early life and education ==
Weyer was born in Hastings, Nebraska, the daughter of Frank Elmer Weyer and Mabelle Carey Weyer. Her father was a college dean. She graduated from Hastings College in 1942, and earned a master's degree at the Columbia University Graduate School of Journalism. Her younger sister Phyllis Weyer Garriss was a composer and violin teacher.

== Career ==
Creigh worked as a reporter in Virginia, and went to China in 1946, as a reports officer and economic analyst for the United Nations Relief and Rehabilitation Administration. Back in Hastings after she married, she was garden editor for the local newspaper, and editor of the Hastings College Alumni Quarterly. She was director and founder of the Adams County Historical Society, and served on the board of directors of the Nebraska Arts Council. She was elected to a seat on the State Board of Education.

Creigh was chosen to write the story of Nebraska that was published by W.W. Norton as part of their 50-state series to mark the United States Bicentennial in 1976. She won the Mari Sandoz Award from the Nebraska Library Association in 1981. She won two awards from the American Association for State and Local History. "I think I have always been interested in history, not just a series of dates and presidential sequences and the monarchy, but people," she explained in 1977. She spoke to local audiences about her work.

== Publications ==
- Bellevue College, 1880–1919 (1962)
- Adams County, the People, 1872–1972 (1971)
- Adams County, a Story of the Great Plains (1972)
- Tales from the Prairie (1973, 3 vol.)
- A Primer for Local History Societies (1976)
- Nebraska: A Bicentennial History (1977)
- "Old Movies: A Source for Local History Programs" (1977)
- "Ethnic Groups" (1978, two parts)
- Nebraska: Where Dreams Grow (1980)
- "Lincoln in 1880" (1980)

== Personal life ==
Weyer married Thomas Creigh Jr., an energy company executive, in 1948. They had four children. She died in 1982, in Hastings, at the age of 60.
