= Corissa Yasen =

American track & field athlete and basketball player

Personal information
- Born: December 5, 1973 Omaha, Nebraska, U.S.
- Died: May 12, 2001 (aged 27)
- Listed height: 6 ft 0 in (1.83 m)

Career information
- High school: Coeur d’Alene (Coeur d’Alene, Idaho)
- College: Purdue
- Position: Guard

Career history
- 1997: Sacramento Monarchs
- Stats at Basketball Reference

Corissa Lee Yasen (December 5, 1973 – May 12, 2001) was an American collegiate and professional athlete.

She was born in Omaha, Nebraska, and attended high school in Coeur d'Alene, Idaho.

Yasen attended Purdue University and became a nine-time All-American and 10-time Big Ten Conference champion in track and field. She was Purdue's Female Athlete-of-the-Year as a junior and senior and was a Big Ten Medal of Honor winner, as well as Big Ten Athlete of the Year. She also won the NCAA heptathlon title in 1996. Yasen also joined the Purdue women's basketball program, as a starter, during her final year of eligibility. She graduated in 1997 with a degree in pharmacy.

She went on to play for the Sacramento Monarchs in 1997, the inaugural year of the Women's National Basketball Association (WNBA). During the WNBA offseason, Yasen served as an assistant coach for a high school girls' basketball team in West Lafayette, Indiana when they won the state championship in 1998.

On May 12, 2001, she was found dead in her apartment in Coeur d'Alene. She had been working at a pharmacy in Hayden, Idaho. Her death was ruled as a suicide by an "acute multidrug overdose." A forensic autopsy performed by the Spokane County (Washington) coroner led to a panel of toxicology tests, which were conducted by the National Medical Services Laboratory in Willow Grove, Pennsylvania. High levels of diazepam, hydrocodone, lorazepam, fluoxetine and other drugs were found in the toxicology analysis. Investigators also recovered substantial quantities of various intravenous drugs and narcotics in Yasen's residence.

== Career statistics ==
Legend
GP	Games played	GS	Games started	MPG	Minutes per game	RPG	Rebounds per game
APG	Assists per game	SPG	Steals per game	BPG	Blocks per game	PPG	Points per game
TO	Turnovers per game	FG%	Field-goal percentage	3P%	3-point field-goal percentage	FT%	Free-throw percentage
**Bold**	Career best	°	League leader

=== College ===
Year	Team	GP	GS	MPG	FG%	3P%	FT%	RPG	APG	SPG	BPG	TO	PPG
1996-97	Purdue	28	28	34.7	.461	–	.596	6.2	1.5	2.4	0.6	2.4	11.4

=== WNBA ===
==== Regular season ====
Year	Team	GP	GS	MPG	FG%	3P%	FT%	RPG	APG	SPG	BPG	TO	PPG
1997	Sacramento	19	0	9.9	.404	.000	.500	1.1	.3	.9	.1	.8	2.7
