= Gordon B. Dodds =

American professor of history (1932–2003)

Gordon B. Dodds (March 12, 1932 – August 29, 2003) was a professor of history and then professor emeritus at Portland State University (PSU) as well as an author. He wrote and edited several books and contributed articles and reviews for the Journal of American History, Western Political Quarterly, American Historical Review, Pacific Northwest Quarterly, and Oregon Historical Quarterly.

He was born in Milwaukee, Wisconsin. He earned degrees from Harvard College (BA), University of Illinois (MA), and University of Wisconsin (PhD). He also was an instructor at Knox College.

He chaired PSU's history department from 1996 to 1999, was a union leader of PSU faculty in the American Association of University Professors, and an archivist for the university after he retired as a professor.

He wrote books about Oregon history, Portland State University, fishery owner R. D. Hume and public works engineer Hiram Martin Crittenden.

== Bibliography ==
- A Pygmy Monopolist. The life and doings of R.D. Hume (1961)
- The Salmon King of Oregon; R. D. Hume and the Pacific Fisheries (1963)
- Oregon: A Bicentennial History (1977)
- Oregon: A History (1977)
- Hiram Martin Crittenden; His Public Career
- The American Northwest; A History of Oregon and Washington (1986)
- Varieties of Hope: An Anthology of Oregon Prose, editor (1993)
- The College That Would Not Die; The First Fifty Years of Portland State University (2000)
- The Silicon Forest: High Tech in the Portland Area, 1945 to 1986 with Craig E. Wollner
