= Rice Owls track and field =

College track and field team

- University: Rice University
- Head coach: Jon Warren
- Conference: The American
- Location: Houston, Texas
- Outdoor track: Wendel D. Ley Track and Holloway Field
- Nickname: Owls
- Colors: Blue and gray

The Rice Owls track and field team is the track and field program that represents Rice University. The Owls compete in NCAA Division I as a member of the American Conference. The team is based in Houston, Texas at the Wendel D. Ley Track and Holloway Field.

The program is coached by Jon Warren. The track and field program officially encompasses four teams, as the NCAA regards men's and women's indoor track and field and outdoor track and field as separate sports.

Two Rice athletes have gone on to win Olympic medals in track and field, both men's pole vaulters Fred Hansen and David Roberts. A third Rice track and field athlete, Heather McDermid, has also won Olympic medals, but in the eight competition of rowing.

== Postseason ==
=== AIAW ===
The Owls have had 2 AIAW All-Americans finishing in the top six at the AIAW outdoor or indoor championships.

AIAW All-Americans
Championships	Name	Event	Place
1969 Outdoor	Carleen Groves	880 yards	4th
1969 Outdoor	Carleen Groves	Mile run	4th
1981 Outdoor	Catherine Baker	800 meters	5th

=== NCAA ===
As of 2024, a total of 69 men and 34 women have achieved individual All-American status at the men's outdoor, women's outdoor, men's indoor, or women's indoor national championships.

First team NCAA All-Americans
Team	Championships	Name	Event	Place	Ref.
Men's	1921 Outdoor	Marion Lindsey	Shot put	4th	
Men's	1927 Outdoor	Emmett Brunson	Mile run	3rd	
Men's	1928 Outdoor	Ernest Weichert	100 meters	>6th	
Men's	1928 Outdoor	Claude Bracey	100 meters	1st	
Men's	1928 Outdoor	Claude Bracey	200 meters	1st	
Men's	1928 Outdoor	Emmett Brunson	800 meters	4th	
Men's	1928 Outdoor	Weldon Cabaniss	Pole vault	4th	
Men's	1929 Outdoor	Claude Bracey	100 meters	2nd	
Men's	1929 Outdoor	Claude Bracey	200 meters	3rd	
Men's	1930 Outdoor	Claude Bracey	100 meters	5th	
Men's	1930 Outdoor	Claude Bracey	200 meters	8th	
Men's	1931 Outdoor	Percy Burk	Shot put	6th	
Men's	1933 Outdoor	Louis Adams	Long jump	5th	
Men's	1933 Outdoor	Joe Petty	Discus throw	4th	
Men's	1934 Outdoor	Louis Brothers	400 meters	4th	
Men's	1935 Outdoor	Bill Wallace	220 yards hurdles	3rd	
Men's	1935 Outdoor	Jess Petty	Discus throw	6th	
Men's	1936 Outdoor	Jack Patterson	220 yards hurdles	4th	
Men's	1936 Outdoor	Jack Patterson	400 meters hurdles	3rd	
Men's	1936 Outdoor	Louis Brothers	800 meters	6th	
Men's	1936 Outdoor	David Weichert	Pole vault	3rd	
Men's	1936 Outdoor	Jess Petty	Discus throw	4th	
Men's	1937 Outdoor	Jack Patterson	110 meters hurdles	6th	
Men's	1937 Outdoor	David Weichert	Pole vault	6th	
Men's	1938 Outdoor	Fred Walcott	220 yards hurdles	1st	
Men's	1938 Outdoor	Fred Wolcott	110 meters hurdles	1st	
Men's	1938 Outdoor	E. Y. Steakley	200 meters	5th	
Men's	1938 Outdoor	Calvin Bell	800 meters	5th	
Men's	1939 Outdoor	Fred Walcott	220 yards hurdles	1st	
Men's	1939 Outdoor	Fred Wolcott	110 meters hurdles	1st	
Men's	1940 Outdoor	Fred Walcott	220 yards hurdles	1st	
Men's	1940 Outdoor	Fred Wolcott	110 meters hurdles	2nd	
Men's	1941 Outdoor	Henry Coffman	High jump	6th	
Men's	1942 Outdoor	Billy Cummins	220 yards hurdles	4th	
Men's	1942 Outdoor	Harold Hall	200 meters	4th	
Men's	1943 Outdoor	Billy Cummins	220 yards hurdles	1st	
Men's	1943 Outdoor	Billy Cummins	110 meters hurdles	1st	
Men's	1943 Outdoor	Billy Christopher	High jump	2nd	
Men's	1943 Outdoor	Billy Christopher	Long jump	1st	
Men's	1946 Outdoor	Augie Erfurth	220 yards hurdles	>6th	
Men's	1946 Outdoor	Augie Erfurth	110 meters hurdles	5th	
Men's	1946 Outdoor	Henry Coffman	High jump	5th	
Men's	1947 Outdoor	Augie Erfurth	110 meters hurdles	5th	
Men's	1947 Outdoor	Henry Coffman	High jump	2nd	
Men's	1948 Outdoor	Augie Erfurth	110 meters hurdles	5th	
Men's	1948 Outdoor	Vern McGrew	High jump	3rd	
Men's	1949 Outdoor	Augie Erfurth	110 meters hurdles	8th	
Men's	1949 Outdoor	Tom Cox	400 meters	7th	
Men's	1949 Outdoor	Vern McGrew	High jump	2nd	
Men's	1950 Outdoor	Tom Cox	400 meters	2nd	
Men's	1950 Outdoor	Vern McGrew	High jump	1st	
Men's	1954 Outdoor	Harold Griffin	400 meters	3rd	
Men's	1956 Outdoor	Roy Thompson	400 meters hurdles	3rd	
Men's	1957 Outdoor	Roy Thompson	220 yards hurdles	4th	
Men's	1959 Outdoor	Dale Moseley	Long jump	6th	
Men's	1961 Outdoor	Fred Hansen	Pole vault	4th	
Men's	1962 Outdoor	Fred Hansen	Pole vault	1st	
Men's	1962 Outdoor	Ed Red	Javelin throw	6th	
Men's	1963 Outdoor	Bobby May	110 meters hurdles	7th	
Men's	1963 Outdoor	Fred Hansen	Pole vault	4th	
Men's	1963 Outdoor	Ed Red	Javelin throw	4th	
Men's	1964 Outdoor	Bobby May	110 meters hurdles	1st	
Men's	1964 Outdoor	Ed Red	Javelin throw	4th	
Men's	1965 Outdoor	Warren Brattlof	Pole vault	8th	
Men's	1967 Outdoor	Jim Wilkerson	110 meters hurdles	7th	
Men's	1967 Outdoor	Doug Belzung	200 meters	7th	
Men's	1967 Outdoor	Conley Brown	400 meters	7th	
Men's	1967 Outdoor	Conley Brown	4 × 100 meters relay	3rd	
Men's	1967 Outdoor	Fred Cloud	4 × 100 meters relay	3rd	
Men's	1967 Outdoor	Doug Belzung	4 × 100 meters relay	3rd	
Men's	1967 Outdoor	Dale Bernauer	4 × 100 meters relay	3rd	
Men's	1967 Outdoor	Mike Casey	4 × 400 meters relay	2nd	
Men's	1967 Outdoor	Fred Cloud	4 × 400 meters relay	2nd	
Men's	1967 Outdoor	Conley Brown	4 × 400 meters relay	2nd	
Men's	1967 Outdoor	Dale Bernauer	4 × 400 meters relay	2nd	
Men's	1967 Outdoor	Ricki Jacobs	Javelin throw	4th	
Men's	1968 Outdoor	Conley Brown	4 × 100 meters relay	4th	
Men's	1968 Outdoor	Jack Faubion	4 × 100 meters relay	4th	
Men's	1968 Outdoor	Mike McKee	4 × 100 meters relay	4th	
Men's	1968 Outdoor	Dale Bernauer	4 × 100 meters relay	4th	
Men's	1968 Outdoor	Conley Brown	4 × 400 meters relay	7th	
Men's	1968 Outdoor	Fred Cloud	4 × 400 meters relay	7th	
Men's	1968 Outdoor	Mike McKee	4 × 400 meters relay	7th	
Men's	1968 Outdoor	Dale Bernauer	4 × 400 meters relay	7th	
Men's	1969 Outdoor	Conley Brown	4 × 100 meters relay	2nd	
Men's	1969 Outdoor	Bill Askey	4 × 100 meters relay	2nd	
Men's	1969 Outdoor	Doug Belzung	4 × 100 meters relay	2nd	
Men's	1969 Outdoor	Dale Bernauer	4 × 100 meters relay	2nd	
Men's	1969 Outdoor	Bill Askey	4 × 400 meters relay	2nd	
Men's	1969 Outdoor	Conley Brown	4 × 400 meters relay	2nd	
Men's	1969 Outdoor	Steve Straub	4 × 400 meters relay	2nd	
Men's	1969 Outdoor	Dale Bernauer	4 × 400 meters relay	2nd	
Men's	1970 Outdoor	Dennis Dicke	4 × 400 meters relay	2nd	
Men's	1970 Outdoor	Steve Straub	4 × 400 meters relay	2nd	
Men's	1970 Outdoor	Chip Grandjean	4 × 400 meters relay	2nd	
Men's	1970 Outdoor	Bill Askey	4 × 400 meters relay	2nd	
Men's	1970 Outdoor	Dave Roberts	Pole vault	6th	
Men's	1971 Outdoor	Steve Straub	400 meters	7th	
Men's	1971 Outdoor	Mike Cronholm	400 meters hurdles	6th	
Men's	1971 Outdoor	Dennis Dicke	4 × 400 meters relay	6th	
Men's	1971 Outdoor	Steve Straub	4 × 400 meters relay	6th	
Men's	1971 Outdoor	Linn Bingham	4 × 400 meters relay	6th	
Men's	1971 Outdoor	Chip Grandjean	4 × 400 meters relay	6th	
Men's	1971 Outdoor	Dave Roberts	Pole vault	1st	
Men's	1972 Outdoor	Dave Roberts	Pole vault	1st	
Men's	1972 Outdoor	Ken Stadel	Discus throw	2nd	
Men's	1973 Outdoor	Mike Cronholm	400 meters hurdles	6th	
Men's	1973 Outdoor	Dave Roberts	Pole vault	1st	
Men's	1973 Outdoor	Ken Stadel	Discus throw	2nd	
Men's	1974 Outdoor	Ken Stadel	Discus throw	5th	
Men's	1975 Outdoor	Jeff Wells	5000 meters	4th	
Men's	1976 Outdoor	Jeff Wells	10,000 meters	3rd	
Men's	1977 Outdoor	Carlton Derrett	100 meters	5th	
Men's	1978 Outdoor	Mike Novelli	5000 meters	6th	
Men's	1979 Outdoor	Doc King	110 meters hurdles	4th	
Men's	1981 Outdoor	Marty Froelick	10,000 meters	7th	
Men's	1981 Outdoor	Paul Brattlof	Pole vault	4th	
Men's	1982 Indoor	Paul Brattlof	Pole vault	6th	
Men's	1982 Outdoor	Sherman Hall	4 × 100 meters relay	4th	
Men's	1982 Outdoor	Terry Jones	4 × 100 meters relay	4th	
Men's	1982 Outdoor	Elliston Stinson	4 × 100 meters relay	4th	
Men's	1982 Outdoor	Vince Courville	4 × 100 meters relay	4th	
Women's	1983 Indoor	Regina Cavanaugh	Shot put	4th	
Men's	1983 Outdoor	Gawain Guy	1500 meters	8th	
Men's	1983 Outdoor	Sherman Hall	4 × 100 meters relay	7th	
Men's	1983 Outdoor	Terry Jones	4 × 100 meters relay	7th	
Men's	1983 Outdoor	John Bell	4 × 100 meters relay	7th	
Men's	1983 Outdoor	Vince Courville	4 × 100 meters relay	7th	
Men's	1983 Outdoor	Paul Brattlof	Pole vault	6th	
Women's	1983 Outdoor	Regina Cavanaugh	Shot put	3rd	
Women's	1984 Indoor	Kattrice Harris	4 × 400 meters relay	6th	
Women's	1984 Indoor	Tammy Welch	4 × 400 meters relay	6th	
Women's	1984 Indoor	Monique Miller	4 × 400 meters relay	6th	
Women's	1984 Indoor	Laura Shoppa	4 × 400 meters relay	6th	
Women's	1984 Indoor	Regina Cavanaugh	Shot put	1st	
Men's	1984 Outdoor	Elliston Stinson	100 meters	4th	
Men's	1985 Indoor	Gawain Guy	1000 meters	1st	
Women's	1985 Indoor	Tanya McIntosh	400 meters	5th	
Women's	1985 Indoor	Kattrice Harris	4 × 400 meters relay	3rd	
Women's	1985 Indoor	Tammy Welch	4 × 400 meters relay	3rd	
Women's	1985 Indoor	Monique Miller	4 × 400 meters relay	3rd	
Women's	1985 Indoor	Tonya McIntosh	4 × 400 meters relay	3rd	
Women's	1985 Indoor	Regina Cavanaugh	Shot put	1st	
Men's	1985 Outdoor	Elliston Stinson	4 × 100 meters relay	2nd	
Men's	1985 Outdoor	Terry Jones	4 × 100 meters relay	2nd	
Men's	1985 Outdoor	Steven Hall	4 × 100 meters relay	2nd	
Men's	1985 Outdoor	Courtney Brown	4 × 100 meters relay	2nd	
Women's	1985 Outdoor	Katrice Harris	4 × 100 meters relay	7th	
Women's	1985 Outdoor	Laura Wright	4 × 100 meters relay	7th	
Women's	1985 Outdoor	Cecilia Nuñez	4 × 100 meters relay	7th	
Women's	1985 Outdoor	Tanya McIntosh	4 × 100 meters relay	7th	
Women's	1985 Outdoor	Regina Cavanaugh	Shot put	1st	
Men's	1986 Indoor	Gawain Guy	1000 meters	3rd	
Women's	1986 Indoor	Pam Klassen	4 × 800 meters relay	6th	
Women's	1986 Indoor	Michelle Barz	4 × 800 meters relay	6th	
Women's	1986 Indoor	Kristen Aure	4 × 800 meters relay	6th	
Women's	1986 Indoor	Maureen Stewart	4 × 800 meters relay	6th	
Women's	1986 Indoor	Regina Cavanaugh	Shot put	1st	
Men's	1986 Outdoor	Gawain Guy	1500 meters	7th	
Women's	1986 Outdoor	Pam Klassen	3000 meters	8th	
Women's	1986 Outdoor	Regina Cavanaugh	Shot put	1st	
Women's	1986 Outdoor	Regina Cavanaugh	Discus throw	7th	
Men's	1987 Indoor	Patrick Gordon	4 × 400 meters relay	3rd	
Men's	1987 Indoor	Robby Timmons	4 × 400 meters relay	3rd	
Men's	1987 Indoor	Courtney Brown	4 × 400 meters relay	3rd	
Men's	1987 Indoor	Byron Justice	4 × 400 meters relay	3rd	
Women's	1987 Indoor	Pam Klassen	3000 meters	5th	
Women's	1987 Indoor	Robyn Bryant	4 × 400 meters relay	3rd	
Women's	1987 Indoor	Tanya McIntosh	4 × 400 meters relay	3rd	
Women's	1987 Indoor	Maureen Stewart	4 × 400 meters relay	3rd	
Women's	1987 Indoor	Tammy Welch	4 × 400 meters relay	3rd	
Men's	1987 Outdoor	Robby Timmons	4 × 400 meters relay	5th	
Men's	1987 Outdoor	Patrick Gordon	4 × 400 meters relay	5th	
Men's	1987 Outdoor	Byron Justice	4 × 400 meters relay	5th	
Men's	1987 Outdoor	Courtney Brown	4 × 400 meters relay	5th	
Women's	1987 Outdoor	Pam Klassen	3000 meters	6th	
Women's	1987 Outdoor	Regina Cavanaugh	Shot put	1st	
Women's	1988 Indoor	Tanya McIntosh	400 meters	5th	
Women's	1988 Indoor	Robyn Bryant	4 × 400 meters relay	4th	
Women's	1988 Indoor	Michele Lynch	4 × 400 meters relay	4th	
Women's	1988 Indoor	Tanya McIntosh	4 × 400 meters relay	4th	
Women's	1988 Indoor	Maureen Stewart	4 × 400 meters relay	4th	
Women's	1988 Outdoor	Tanya McIntosh	400 meters	8th	
Women's	1988 Outdoor	Pam Klassen	3000 meters	8th	
Women's	1989 Indoor	Tanya McIntosh	400 meters	8th	
Women's	1989 Indoor	Robyn Bryant	4 × 400 meters relay	3rd	
Women's	1989 Indoor	Rosey Edeh	4 × 400 meters relay	3rd	
Women's	1989 Indoor	Tanya McIntosh	4 × 400 meters relay	3rd	
Women's	1989 Indoor	Maureen Stewart	4 × 400 meters relay	3rd	
Women's	1989 Indoor	Heather McDermid	4 × 800 meters relay	4th	
Women's	1989 Indoor	Michelle Barz	4 × 800 meters relay	4th	
Women's	1989 Indoor	Kristen Aure	4 × 800 meters relay	4th	
Women's	1989 Indoor	Maureen Stewart	4 × 800 meters relay	4th	
Women's	1989 Indoor	Diane Sommerville	Triple jump	3rd	
Women's	1989 Indoor	Wendi Miller	Shot put	5th	
Women's	1989 Outdoor	Rosey Edeh	400 meters hurdles	3rd	
Women's	1989 Outdoor	Wendi Miller	Shot put	4th	
Men's	1990 Indoor	Gabriel Luke	400 meters	1st	
Women's	1990 Indoor	Rosey Edeh	400 meters	5th	
Women's	1990 Indoor	Sonya Henry	Long jump	4th	
Men's	1990 Outdoor	Gabriel Luke	400 meters	3rd	
Women's	1990 Outdoor	Rosey Edeh	400 meters hurdles	3rd	
Women's	1990 Outdoor	Lila Washington	4 × 100 meters relay	7th	
Women's	1990 Outdoor	Mary McCoy	4 × 100 meters relay	7th	
Women's	1990 Outdoor	Robyn Bryant	4 × 100 meters relay	7th	
Women's	1990 Outdoor	Desiree Woods	4 × 100 meters relay	7th	
Men's	1991 Indoor	Gabriel Luke	400 meters	1st	
Women's	1991 Indoor	Claudia Haywood	Triple jump	4th	
Men's	1991 Outdoor	Gabriel Luke	400 meters	1st	
Men's	1991 Outdoor	Kareem Streete-Thompson	Long jump	5th	
Women's	1991 Outdoor	Julie Jiskra	10,000 meters	4th	
Women's	1992 Indoor	Claudia Haywood	Triple jump	2nd	
Men's	1992 Outdoor	Bryan Bronson	200 meters	5th	
Men's	1992 Outdoor	Chris Caldwell	800 meters	8th	
Men's	1992 Outdoor	Kareem Streete-Thompson	4 × 100 meters relay	7th	
Men's	1992 Outdoor	Bryan Bronson	4 × 100 meters relay	7th	
Men's	1992 Outdoor	James Brown	4 × 100 meters relay	7th	
Men's	1992 Outdoor	Keith Nunn	4 × 100 meters relay	7th	
Women's	1992 Outdoor	Yvette Haynes	Triple jump	7th	
Women's	1992 Outdoor	Claudia Haywood	Triple jump	8th	
Women's	1992 Outdoor	Valerie Tulloch	Javelin throw	1st	
Men's	1993 Indoor	Kareem Streete-Thompson	55 meters	5th	
Men's	1993 Indoor	Bryan Bronson	200 meters	4th	
Men's	1993 Indoor	Kareem Streete-Thompson	Long jump	3rd	
Women's	1993 Indoor	Pam Brooks	4 × 800 meters relay	6th	
Women's	1993 Indoor	Chepella Scurlock	4 × 800 meters relay	6th	
Women's	1993 Indoor	Emily Massad	4 × 800 meters relay	6th	
Women's	1993 Indoor	Candace Lessmeister	4 × 800 meters relay	6th	
Men's	1993 Outdoor	Chris Jones	400 meters	5th	
Men's	1993 Outdoor	Bryan Bronson	400 meters hurdles	1st	
Men's	1993 Outdoor	Chris Jones	4 × 400 meters relay	6th	
Men's	1993 Outdoor	Derek Gurnell	4 × 400 meters relay	6th	
Men's	1993 Outdoor	Bryan Bronson	4 × 400 meters relay	6th	
Men's	1993 Outdoor	Gabriel Luke	4 × 400 meters relay	6th	
Men's	1993 Outdoor	Kareem Streete-Thompson	Long jump	3rd	
Women's	1993 Outdoor	Claudia Haywood	Triple jump	1st	
Women's	1993 Outdoor	Valerie Tulloch	Javelin throw	2nd	
Men's	1994 Indoor	Kareem Streete-Thompson	55 meters	4th	
Men's	1994 Indoor	Chris Jones	400 meters	2nd	
Men's	1994 Indoor	Kareem Streete-Thompson	Long jump	2nd	
Men's	1994 Indoor	Ivory Angello	Triple jump	5th	
Women's	1994 Indoor	Candance Lessmeister	Mile run	2nd	
Women's	1994 Indoor	Pam Brooks	4 × 400 meters relay	6th	
Women's	1994 Indoor	TaNisha Mills	4 × 400 meters relay	6th	
Women's	1994 Indoor	Vonda Newhouse	4 × 400 meters relay	6th	
Women's	1994 Indoor	Melissa Straker	4 × 400 meters relay	6th	
Men's	1994 Outdoor	Chris Jones	400 meters	2nd	
Men's	1994 Outdoor	Quinton Milner	4 × 400 meters relay	6th	
Men's	1994 Outdoor	Brian Klein	4 × 400 meters relay	6th	
Men's	1994 Outdoor	Cliff Alexander	4 × 400 meters relay	6th	
Men's	1994 Outdoor	Chris Jones	4 × 400 meters relay	6th	
Women's	1994 Outdoor	Pam Brooks	400 meters hurdles	5th	
Women's	1994 Outdoor	Nicole Aleskowitch	3000 meters	4th	
Women's	1994 Outdoor	Valerie Tulloch	Javelin throw	1st	
Men's	1995 Indoor	Kareem Streete-Thompson	55 meters	6th	
Men's	1995 Indoor	Bryan Bronson	200 meters	4th	
Men's	1995 Indoor	Kareem Streete-Thompson	Long jump	1st	
Men's	1995 Indoor	Ivory Angello	Triple jump	5th	
Women's	1995 Indoor	Candance Lessmeister	Mile run	6th	
Women's	1995 Indoor	TaNisha Mills	4 × 400 meters relay	7th	
Women's	1995 Indoor	Vonda Newhouse	4 × 400 meters relay	7th	
Women's	1995 Indoor	Andrea Blackett	4 × 400 meters relay	7th	
Women's	1995 Indoor	Melissa Straker	4 × 400 meters relay	7th	
Men's	1995 Outdoor	Kareem Streete-Thompson	100 meters	3rd	
Men's	1995 Outdoor	Cliff Alexander	400 meters hurdles	4th	
Men's	1995 Outdoor	Kareem Streete-Thompson	Long jump	1st	
Men's	1995 Outdoor	Ivory Angello	Triple jump	4th	
Women's	1995 Outdoor	Valerie Tulloch	Javelin throw	1st	
Men's	1996 Indoor	Brian Klein	800 meters	3rd	
Men's	1996 Indoor	Andrew Burrow	4 × 400 meters relay	6th	
Men's	1996 Indoor	Derrick Small	4 × 400 meters relay	6th	
Men's	1996 Indoor	Quinton Milner	4 × 400 meters relay	6th	
Men's	1996 Indoor	Brian Klein	4 × 400 meters relay	6th	
Women's	1996 Outdoor	Andrea Blackett	400 meters hurdles	5th	
Women's	1996 Outdoor	Andrea Blackett	4 × 400 meters relay	4th	
Women's	1996 Outdoor	Melissa Straker	4 × 400 meters relay	4th	
Women's	1996 Outdoor	Vonda Newhouse	4 × 400 meters relay	4th	
Women's	1996 Outdoor	TaNisha Mills	4 × 400 meters relay	4th	
Men's	1997 Indoor	Derras Washington	55 meters hurdles	8th	
Women's	1997 Indoor	Andrea Blackett	4 × 400 meters relay	1st	
Women's	1997 Indoor	TaNisha Mills	4 × 400 meters relay	1st	
Women's	1997 Indoor	Margaret Fox	4 × 400 meters relay	1st	
Women's	1997 Indoor	Melissa Stoker	4 × 400 meters relay	1st	
Men's	1997 Outdoor	Quinton Milner	400 meters hurdles	4th	
Women's	1997 Outdoor	Andrea Blackett	400 meters hurdles	2nd	
Women's	1997 Outdoor	Andrea Blackett	4 × 400 meters relay	7th	
Women's	1997 Outdoor	TaNisha Mills	4 × 400 meters relay	7th	
Women's	1997 Outdoor	Margaret Fox	4 × 400 meters relay	7th	
Women's	1997 Outdoor	Melissa Straker	4 × 400 meters relay	7th	
Men's	1998 Indoor	Drexell Owusu	Triple jump	6th	
Men's	1998 Outdoor	Drexell Owusu	Triple jump	7th	
Women's	1999 Indoor	Kari Vigerstol	Distance medley relay	6th	
Women's	1999 Indoor	Margaret Fox	Distance medley relay	6th	
Women's	1999 Indoor	Aimee Teteris	Distance medley relay	6th	
Women's	1999 Indoor	Erin Brand	Distance medley relay	6th	
Women's	2000 Indoor	Kari Vigerstol	Distance medley relay	6th	
Women's	2000 Indoor	Kelchi Anderson	Distance medley relay	6th	
Women's	2000 Indoor	Aimee Teteris	Distance medley relay	6th	
Women's	2000 Indoor	Shaquandra Robers	Distance medley relay	6th	
Women's	2000 Indoor	Alice Falaiye	Long jump	4th	
Women's	2000 Outdoor	Shaquandra Roberson	800 meters	4th	
Women's	2000 Outdoor	Shaquandra Roberson	1500 meters	4th	
Men's	2001 Indoor	Adam Davis	800 meters	7th	
Men's	2001 Indoor	Tommy Oleksy	Long jump	4th	
Women's	2001 Indoor	Alice Falaiye	Long jump	3rd	
Women's	2001 Outdoor	Allison Beckford	400 meters	1st	
Women's	2001 Outdoor	Allison Beckford	400 meters hurdles	2nd	
Women's	2001 Outdoor	Alice Falaiye	Long jump	2nd	
Men's	2002 Indoor	Vaughaligan Walwyn	Long jump	3rd	
Women's	2002 Indoor	Allison Beckford	400 meters	1st	
Women's	2002 Indoor	Aimee Teteris	800 meters	4th	
Women's	2002 Indoor	Yvonne Umeh	4 × 400 meters relay	7th	
Women's	2002 Indoor	Aimee Teteris	4 × 400 meters relay	7th	
Women's	2002 Indoor	Keitha Moseley	4 × 400 meters relay	7th	
Women's	2002 Indoor	Allison Beckford	4 × 400 meters relay	7th	
Women's	2002 Indoor	Tanya Wright	Distance medley relay	6th	
Women's	2002 Indoor	Yvonne Umeh	Distance medley relay	6th	
Women's	2002 Indoor	Aimee Teteris	Distance medley relay	6th	
Women's	2002 Indoor	Erin Brand	Distance medley relay	6th	
Women's	2002 Indoor	Alice Falaiye	Long jump	4th	
Men's	2002 Outdoor	Ryan Harlan	Decathlon	5th	
Women's	2002 Outdoor	Allison Beckford	400 meters	1st	
Men's	2003 Outdoor	Tommy Oleksey	Long jump	6th	
Women's	2003 Outdoor	Allison Beckford	400 meters	4th	
Women's	2004 Indoor	Beth Hinshaw	Pole vault	7th	
Men's	2004 Outdoor	Ben Wiggins	400 meters hurdles	5th	
Men's	2004 Outdoor	Adam Davis	1500 meters	8th	
Men's	2004 Outdoor	Ryan Harlan	Decathlon	1st	
Women's	2004 Outdoor	Allison Beckford	400 meters	7th	
Women's	2005 Outdoor	Krystal Robinson	Discus throw	4th	
Women's	2006 Outdoor	Krystal Robinson	Discus throw	3rd	
Men's	2007 Indoor	Pablo Solares	Mile run	5th	
Women's	2007 Outdoor	Funmi Jimoh	Long jump	5th	
Women's	2008 Outdoor	Rachel Greff	Pole vault	5th	
Men's	2009 Indoor	Jason Colwick	Pole vault	1st	
Women's	2009 Indoor	Lennie Waite	Mile run	6th	
Men's	2009 Outdoor	Jason Colwick	Pole vault	1st	
Women's	2009 Outdoor	Lennie Waite	3000 meters steeplechase	5th	
Men's	2010 Indoor	Jason Colwick	Pole vault	2nd	
Women's	2012 Outdoor	Becky Wade	10,000 meters	8th	
Women's	2014 Indoor	Claire Uke	Shot put	8th	
Men's	2014 Outdoor	Chris Pillow	Pole vault	7th	
Men's	2014 Outdoor	Evan Karakolis	Javelin throw	7th	
Men's	2015 Indoor	Chris Pillow	Pole vault	7th	
Women's	2015 Indoor	Claire Uke	Shot put	8th	
Women's	2015 Outdoor	Daisy Ding	Triple jump	8th	
Men's	2016 Outdoor	Evan Karakolis	Javelin throw	5th	
Men's	2017 Outdoor	Scott Filip	Decathlon	5th	
Men's	2018 Outdoor	Scott Filip	Decathlon	5th	
Women's	2021 Indoor	Grace Forbes	5000 meters	6th	
Women's	2021 Outdoor	Grace Forbes	10,000 meters	7th	
Women's	2021 Outdoor	Michelle Fokam	Triple jump	3rd	
Women's	2021 Outdoor	Tara Simpson-Sullivan	Hammer throw	4th	
Women's	2022 Indoor	Josie Taylor	High jump	8th	
Women's	2022 Outdoor	Grace Forbes	10,000 meters	2nd	
Women's	2023 Indoor	Erna Sóley Gunnarsdóttir	Shot put	7th	
Women's	2023 Outdoor	Tara Simpson-Sullivan	Hammer throw	5th	
Men's	2024 Indoor	Alexander Slinkman	Pole vault	7th	
Women's	2024 Indoor	Eliza Kraule	Pentathlon	5th	
Women's	2024 Outdoor	Tara Simpson-Sullivan	Hammer throw	2nd	
Women's	2024 Outdoor	McKyla Vander Westhuizen	Javelin throw	3rd	

== See also ==
- Category:Rice Owls men's track and field athletes (24)
- Category:Rice Owls women's track and field athletes (13)
