= Pole vault at the NCAA Division I Outdoor Track and Field Championships =

This is a list of the NCAA Division I outdoor champions in the pole vault. Measurement of the jumps was conducted in imperial distances (feet and inches) until 1975. Metrication occurred in 1976, so all subsequent championships were measured in metric distances. The women's event was introduced in 1998.

== Winners ==
Key
A=Altitude assisted
i=indoors (1970)

Women's pole vault winners
Year	Athlete	Team	Height
1998	Bianca Maran	Cal Poly Mustangs	3.80 m (12 ft 5 1/2 in)
1999	Paula Serrano	Cal Poly Mustangs	4.10 m (13 ft 5 1/4 in)
2000	Tracy O'Hara	UCLA Bruins	4.40 m (14 ft 5 in)
2001	Andrea Dutoit	Arizona Wildcats	4.20 m (13 ft 9 1/4 in)
2002	Tracy O'Hara	UCLA Bruins	4.10 m (13 ft 5 1/4 in)
2003	Becky Holliday	Oregon Ducks	4.41 m (14 ft 5 1/2 in)
2004	Chelsea Johnson	UCLA Bruins	4.30 m (14 ft 1 1/4 in)
2005	Kate Soma	Washington Huskies	4.30 m (14 ft 1 1/4 in)
2006	Lacy Janson	Florida State Seminoles	4.25 m (13 ft 11 1/4 in)
2007	April Kubishta	Arizona State Sun Devils	4.25 m (13 ft 11 1/4 in)
2008	Katherine Morgan	California Golden Bears	4.20 m (13 ft 9 1/4 in)
2009	Kylie Hutson	Indiana State Sycamores	4.40 m (14 ft 5 in)
2010	Kylie Hutson	Indiana State Sycamores	4.45 m (14 ft 7 in)
2011	Melissa Gergel	Oregon Ducks	4.45 m (14 ft 7 in)
2012	Katerina Stefanidi (GRE)	Stanford Cardinal	4.45 m (14 ft 7 in)
2013	Bethany Firsick	South Dakota Coyotes	4.45 m (14 ft 7 in)
2014	Annika Roloff	Akron Zips	4.40 m (14 ft 5 in)
2015	Demi Payne	Stephen F. Austin Ladyjacks	4.70 m (15 ft 5 in)
2016	Alexis Weeks	Arkansas Razorbacks	4.50 m (14 ft 9 in)
2017	Olivia Gruver	Kentucky Wildcats	4.50 m (14 ft 9 in)
2018	Olivia Gruver	Kentucky Wildcats	4.55 m (14 ft 11 in)
2019	Victoria Hoggard	Arkansas Razorbacks	4.56 m (14 ft 11 1/2 in)
2020	N/A	N/A	N/A
2021	Lisa Gunnarsson (SWE)	LSU Lady Tigers	4.40 m (14 ft 5 in)
2022	Gabriela Leon	Louisville Cardinals	4.60 m (15 ft 1 in)
2023	Julia Fixsen	Virginia Tech Hokies	4.45 m (14 ft 7 in)
2024	Chloe Timberg	Rutgers Scarlet Knights	4.71 m (15 ft 5 1/4 in)
2025	Hana Moll	Washington Huskies	4.79 m (15 ft 8 1/2 in)
2026	Amanda Moll	Washington Huskies	4.84 m (15 ft 10 1/2 in)

Men's pole vault winners
Year	Athlete	Team	Height
1921	Truman Gardner	Yale Bulldogs	3.66 m (12 ft 0 in)
1921	Eldon Jenne	Washington State Cougars	3.66 m (12 ft 0 in)
1921	Longino Welch	Georgia Tech Yellow Jackets	3.66 m (12 ft 0 in)
1921	Lloyd Wilder	Wisconsin Badgers	3.66 m (12 ft 0 in)
1922	John Landowski	Michigan Wolverines	3.81 m (12 ft 6 in)
1922	Allen "Brick" Norris	California Golden Bears	3.81 m (12 ft 6 in)
1923	James Brooker	Michigan Wolverines	3.94 m (12 ft 11 in)
1923	Earle McKown	Emporia State Hornets	3.94 m (12 ft 11 in)
1924	not held		
1925	Royal Bouschor	Northwestern Wildcats	3.76 m (12 ft 4 in)
1925	Kenneth Lancaster	Missouri Tigers	3.76 m (12 ft 4 in)
1925	Earle McKown	Emporia State Hornets	3.76 m (12 ft 4 in)
1925	Philip Northrup	Michigan Wolverines	3.76 m (12 ft 4 in)
1925	Frank Potts	Oklahoma Sooners	3.76 m (12 ft 4 in)
1926	Paul Harrington	Notre Dame Fighting Irish	3.98 m (13 ft 1/2 in)
1927	William Droegemuller	Northwestern Wildcats	3.96 m (12 ft 11 3/4 in)
1928	Ward Edmonds	Stanford Cardinal	4.13 m (13 ft 6 1/2 in)
1929	Ward Edmonds	Stanford Cardinal	4.19 m (13 ft 8 3/4 in)
1929	Tom Warne	Northwestern Wildcats	4.19 m (13 ft 8 3/4 in)
1930	Tom Warne	Northwestern Wildcats	4.21 m (13 ft 9 1/2 in)
1931	William Graber	USC Trojans	4.22 m (13 ft 10 in)
1931	Verne McDermont	Illinois Fighting Illini	4.22 m (13 ft 10 in)
1931	Tom Warne	Northwestern Wildcats	4.22 m (13 ft 10 in)
1932	Bryce Beecher	Indiana Hoosiers	4.21 m (13 ft 9 1/2 in)
1933	Matt Gordy	LSU Tigers	4.24 m (13 ft 10 3/4 in)
1933	William Graber	USC Trojans	4.24 m (13 ft 10 3/4 in)
1934	Jack Rand	San Diego State Aztecs	4.28 m (14 ft 1/2 in)
1935	Earle Meadows	USC Trojans	4.30 m (14 ft 1 1/4 in)
1935	William Sefton	USC Trojans	4.30 m (14 ft 1 1/4 in)
1936	Earle Meadows	USC Trojans	4.31 m (14 ft 1 1/2 in)
1936	William Sefton	USC Trojans	4.31 m (14 ft 1 1/2 in)
1937	William Sefton	USC Trojans	4.49 m (14 ft 8 3/4 in)
1938	Loring Day	USC Trojans	4.32 m (14 ft 2 in)
1939	Richard Ganslen	Columbia Lions	4.39 m (14 ft 4 3/4 in)
1940	Kenneth Dills	USC Trojans	4.21 m (13 ft 9 1/2 in)
1941	Harold Hunt	Nebraska Cornhuskers	4.32 m (14 ft 2 in)
1941	Guinn Smith	California Golden Bears	4.32 m (14 ft 2 in)
1942	Jack DeField	Minnesota Golden Gophers	4.29 m (14 ft 3/4 in)
1943	Jack DeField	Minnesota Golden Gophers	4.29 m (14 ft 3/4 in)
1944	Phillip Anderson	Notre Dame Fighting Irish	4.11 m (13 ft 6 in)
1944	William Blackwell	Oberlin Yeomen	4.11 m (13 ft 6 in)
1944	Robert Phelps	Illinois Fighting Illini	4.11 m (13 ft 6 in)
1944	John Schmidt	Ohio State Buckeyes	4.11 m (13 ft 6 in)
1945	Robert Phelps	Illinois Fighting Illini	4.11 m (13 ft 6 in)
1946	Bill Moore	Northwestern Wildcats	4.16 m (13 ft 7 3/4 in)
1947	Robert Hart	USC Trojans	4.27 m (14 ft 0 in)A
1947	Ray Maggard	UCLA Bruins	4.27 m (14 ft 0 in)A
1947	Bill Moore	Northwestern Wildcats	4.27 m (14 ft 0 in)A
1947	Richmond "Boo" Morcom	New Hampshire Wildcats	4.27 m (14 ft 0 in)A
1947	George Rasmussen	Oregon Ducks	4.27 m (14 ft 0 in)A
1947	Bob Richards	Illinois Fighting Illini	4.27 m (14 ft 0 in)A
1948	Warren Bateman	Colorado Buffaloes	4.27 m (14 ft 0 in)
1948	George Rasmussen	Oregon Ducks	4.27 m (14 ft 0 in)
1949	Bobby Smith	San Diego State Aztecs	4.34 m (14 ft 2 3/4 in)
1950	Bobby Smith	San Diego State Aztecs	4.34 m (14 ft 2 3/4 in)
1951	Don Laz	Illinois Fighting Illini	4.51 m (14 ft 9 1/2 in)
1952	Dick Coleman	Illinois Fighting Illini	4.19 m (13 ft 8 3/4 in)
1952	Lyle Dickey	Oregon State Beavers	4.19 m (13 ft 8 3/4 in)
1952	Dave Martindale	Idaho Vandals	4.19 m (13 ft 8 3/4 in)
1952	Bill Priddy	San Jose State Spartans	4.19 m (13 ft 8 3/4 in)
1952	Gordon Riddell	Colorado State Rams	4.19 m (13 ft 8 3/4 in)
1953	Fred Barnes	Fresno State Bulldogs	4.42 m (14 ft 6 in)
1954	Lawrence Anderson	California Golden Bears	4.32 m (14 ft 2 in)
1954	Earl Poucher	Florida Gators	4.32 m (14 ft 2 in)
1955	Don Bragg	Villanova Wildcats	4.60 m (15 ft 1 in)
1956	Jim Graham	Oklahoma State Cowboys	4.47 m (14 ft 7 3/4 in)
1956	Bob Gutowski	Occidental Tigers	4.47 m (14 ft 7 3/4 in)
1957	Bob Gutowski	Occidental Tigers	4.82 m (15 ft 9 3/4 in)
1958	Robert Davis	Missouri Tigers	4.37 m (14 ft 4 in)
1958	Gene Freudenthal	USC Trojans	4.37 m (14 ft 4 in)
1958	Jim Johnston	Purdue Boilermakers	4.37 m (14 ft 4 in)
1958	Stanley Lyons	Ohio State Buckeyes	4.37 m (14 ft 4 in)
1959	Jim Graham	Oklahoma State Cowboys	4.62 m (15 ft 1 3/4 in)
1960	John David Martin	Oklahoma Sooners	4.49 m (14 ft 8 3/4 in)
1961	Jim Brewer	USC Trojans	4.67 m (15 ft 3 3/4 in)
1961	George Davies	Oklahoma State Cowboys	4.67 m (15 ft 3 3/4 in)
1961	Dick Gear	San Jose State Spartans	4.67 m (15 ft 3 3/4 in)
1962	John Belitza	Maryland Terrapins	4.65 m (15 ft 3 in)
1962	Dexter Elkins	SMU Mustangs	4.65 m (15 ft 3 in)
1962	Fred Hansen	Rice Owls	4.65 m (15 ft 3 in)
1962	Don Meyers	Colorado Buffaloes	4.65 m (15 ft 3 in)
1963	Brian Sternberg	Washington Huskies	4.97 m (16 ft 3 1/2 in)A
1964	John Uelses	La Salle Explorers	4.87 m (15 ft 11 1/2 in)
1965	Bill Fosdick	USC Trojans	4.79 m (15 ft 8 1/2 in)
1966	Chuck Rogers	Colorado Buffaloes	4.87 m (15 ft 11 1/2 in)
1967	Bob Seagren	USC Trojans	5.28 m (17 ft 3 3/4 in)A
1968	Jon Vaughn	UCLA Bruins	5.19 m (17 ft 1/4 in)
1969	Bob Seagren	USC Trojans	5.36 m (17 ft 7 in)
1970	Jan Johnson	Kansas Jayhawks	5.36 m (17 ft 7 in)i
1971	Dave Roberts	Rice Owls	5.34 m (17 ft 6 in)
1972	Dave Roberts	Rice Owls	5.26 m (17 ft 3 in)
1973	Dave Roberts	Rice Owls	5.28 m (17 ft 3 3/4 in)
1974	Ed Lipscomb	Oregon State Beavers	5.26 m (17 ft 3 in)
1975	Earl Bell	Arkansas State Red Wolves	5.51 m (18 ft 3/4 in)A
1976	Earl Bell	Arkansas State Red Wolves	5.52 m (18 ft 1 1/4 in)
1977	Earl Bell	Arkansas State Red Wolves	5.33 m (17 ft 5 3/4 in)
1978	Mike Tully	UCLA Bruins	5.53 m (18 ft 1 1/2 in)
1979	Paul Pilla	Arkansas State Red Wolves	5.29 m (17 ft 4 1/4 in)
1980	Randy Hall	Texas A&M Aggies	5.54 m (18 ft 2 in)
1981	Dave Volz	Indiana Hoosiers	5.39 m (17 ft 8 in)
1982	Dave Kenworthy	USC Trojans	5.48 m (17 ft 11 1/2 in)A
1983	Felix Böhni (SUI)	San Jose State Spartans	5.55 m (18 ft 2 1/2 in)
1984	Joe Dial	Oklahoma State Cowboys	5.55 m (18 ft 2 1/2 in)
1985	Joe Dial	Oklahoma State Cowboys	5.64 m (18 ft 6 in)
1986	Jeff Pascoe	Arkansas Razorbacks	5.50 m (18 ft 1/2 in)
1987	Doug Fraley	Fresno State Bulldogs	5.63 m (18 ft 5 1/2 in)
1988	Kelly Riley	Arkansas State Red Wolves	5.57 m (18 ft 3 1/4 in)
1989	Tim McMichael	Oklahoma Sooners	5.65 m (18 ft 6 1/4 in)A
1990	István Bagyula (HUN)	George Mason Patriots	5.60 m (18 ft 4 1/4 in)
1991	István Bagyula (HUN)	George Mason Patriots	5.80 m (19 ft 1/4 in)
1992	István Bagyula (HUN)	George Mason Patriots	5.80 m (19 ft 1/4 in)
1993	Mark Buse	Indiana Hoosiers	5.60 m (18 ft 4 1/4 in)
1994	Nick Hysong	Arizona State Sun Devils	5.70 m (18 ft 8 1/4 in)
1995	Lawrence Johnson	Tennessee Volunteers	5.70 m (18 ft 8 1/4 in)
1996	Lawrence Johnson	Tennessee Volunteers	5.82 m (19 ft 1 in)
1997	Clark Humphreys	Auburn Tigers	5.60 m (18 ft 4 1/4 in)
1998	Toby Stevenson	Stanford Cardinal	5.55 m (18 ft 2 1/2 in)
1999	Jacob Davis	Texas Longhorns	5.56 m (18 ft 2 3/4 in)
2000	Russ Buller	LSU Tigers	5.60 m (18 ft 4 1/4 in)
2001	Dennis Kholev (ISR)	USC Trojans	5.65 m (18 ft 6 1/4 in)
2002	Brian Hunter	Texas Longhorns	5.70 m (18 ft 8 1/4 in)
2003	Eric Eshbach	Nebraska Cornhuskers	5.45 m (17 ft 10 1/2 in)
2004	Tommy Skipper	Oregon Ducks	5.70 m (18 ft 8 1/4 in)
2005	Robison Pratt (MEX)	BYU Cougars	5.50 m (18 ft 1/2 in)
2006	Tommy Skipper	Oregon Ducks	5.70 m (18 ft 8 1/4 in)
2007	Tommy Skipper	Oregon Ducks	5.50 m (18 ft 1/2 in)
2008	Maston Wallace	Texas Longhorns	5.35 m (17 ft 6 1/2 in)
2009	Jason Colwick	Rice Owls	5.70 m (18 ft 8 1/4 in)
2010	Jordan Scott	Kansas Jayhawks	5.40 m (17 ft 8 1/2 in)
2011	Scott Roth	Washington Huskies	5.40 m (17 ft 8 1/2 in)
2012	Jack Whitt	Oral Roberts Golden Eagles	5.65 m (18 ft 6 1/4 in)
2013	Sam Kendricks	Ole Miss Rebels	5.70 m (18 ft 8 1/4 in)
2014	Sam Kendricks	Ole Miss Rebels	5.70 m (18 ft 8 1/4 in)
2015	Shawn Barber (CAN)	Akron Zips	5.65 m (18 ft 6 1/4 in)
2016	Jake Blankenship	Tennessee Volunteers	5.60 m (18 ft 4 1/4 in)
2017	Matthew Ludwig	Akron Zips	5.65 m (18 ft 6 1/4 in)
2018	Chris Nilsen	South Dakota Coyotes	5.83 m (19 ft 1 1/2 in)
2019	Chris Nilsen	South Dakota Coyotes	5.95 m (19 ft 6 1/4 in)
2021	Branson Ellis	Stephen F. Austin Lumberjacks	5.70 m (18 ft 8 1/4 in)
2022	Sondre Guttormsen (NOR)	Princeton Tigers	5.75 m (18 ft 10 1/4 in)
2023	Kyle Rademeyer (RSA)	South Alabama Jaguars	5.70 m (18 ft 8 1/4 in)
2024	Keaton Daniel	Kentucky Wildcats	5.67 m (18 ft 7 in)
2025	Aleksandr Solovev (RUS)	Texas A&M Aggies	5.78 m (18 ft 11 1/2 in)
2026	Dyson Wicker	Nebraska Cornhuskers	5.85 m (19 ft 2 1/4 in)

Cancelled due to the COVID-19 pandemic.
