= 1993 NCAA Division I Outdoor Track and Field Championships =

- Men's Champion: Arkansas (3rd title); Women's Champion: LSU (7th title)
- Edition: 72nd (Men); 12th (Women)
- Dates: June 2−5, 1993
- Host city: New Orleans, Louisiana
- Venue: Tad Gormley Stadium; University of New Orleans

The 1993 NCAA Division I Outdoor Track and Field Championships were contested June 2−5 at Tad Gormley Stadium at the University of New Orleans in New Orleans, Louisiana in order to determine the individual and team national champions of men's and women's collegiate Division I outdoor track and field events in the United States.

These were the 72nd annual men's championships and the 12th annual women's championships. This was the Privateers' first time hosting the event.

In a repeat of the previous year's result, Arkansas and LSU topped the men's and women's team standings, respectively; it was the Razorbacks' third men's team title and the seventh for the Lady Tigers. This was the second of eight consecutive titles for Arkansas. The Lady Tigers, meanwhile, captured their seventh consecutive title and, ultimately, the seventh of eleven straight titles they won between 1987 and 1997.

== Individual results ==
=== Men's 100 meters ===
- Only top eight final results shown; no prelims are listed

Wind=+1.69 mps

Rank	Name	University	Time	Notes
1st place, gold medalist(s)	Michael Green Jamaica	Clemson	10.09	
2nd place, silver medalist(s)	Glenroy Gilbert Canada	Louisiana State	10.18	
3rd place, bronze medalist(s)	Samuel Jefferson	Houston	10.28	
4	Harlon Thomas	Auburn	10.40	
5	Tim Harden	Kentucky	10.40	
6	Oluyemi Kayode Nigeria	Brigham Young	10.40	
7	Jeff Laynes	Southern California	10.41	
8	Fabian Muyaba Zimbabwe	Louisiana State	10.44	

=== Men's 200 meters ===
- Only top eight final results shown; no prelims are listed

Wind=+3.69 mps

Rank	Name	University	Time	Notes
1st place, gold medalist(s)	Chris Nelloms	Ohio State	20.27	
2nd place, silver medalist(s)	Oluyemi Kayode Nigeria	Brigham Young	20.35	
3rd place, bronze medalist(s)	Glenroy Gilbert Canada	Louisiana State	20.37	
4	Marcel Carter	Florida	20.40	
5	Samuel Jefferson	Houston	20.48	
6	Andrew Tynes Bahamas	Texas-El Paso	20.54	
7	Clyde Rudolph	Kentucky	20.89	
8	Samuel Boateng Ghana	Alabama	20.90	

=== Men's 400 meters ===
- Only top eight final results shown; no prelims are listed

Rank	Name	University	Time	Notes
1st place, gold medalist(s)	Calvin Davis	Arkansas	45.04	
2nd place, silver medalist(s)	Anthuan Maybank	Iowa	45.04	
3rd place, bronze medalist(s)	Derek Mills	Georgia Tech	45.21	
4	Dawda Jallow Gambia	Georgia	45.57	
5	Chris Jones	Rice	45.73	
6	Duaine Ladejo	Texas	45.98	
7	Deon Minor	Baylor	46.37	
8	Tony Miller	Baylor	47.05	

=== Men's 800 meters ===
- Only top eight final results shown; no prelims are listed

Rank	Name	University	Time	Notes
1st place, gold medalist(s)	Jose Parrilla	Tennessee	1:46.51	
2nd place, silver medalist(s)	Scott Peters	Florida	1:47.04	
3rd place, bronze medalist(s)	Conrad Nichols	Georgia Tech	1:47.51	
4	Brad Sumner	Villanova	1:47.65	
5	Joseph Chepsiror Kenya	Iowa State	1:48.32	
6	Lewis Lacy	Florida	1:48.38	
7	David Singoei Kenya	Louisiana State	1:48.68	
8	Todd Black	Bowling Green State	1:48.86	

=== Men's 1500 meters ===
- Only top eight final results shown; no prelims are listed

Rank	Name	University	Time	Notes
1st place, gold medalist(s)	Marko Koers Netherlands	Illinois	3:38.05	
2nd place, silver medalist(s)	Andy Keith United Kingdom	Providence	3:39.06	
3rd place, bronze medalist(s)	Mark Carroll Ireland	Providence	3:39.67	
4	Niall Bruton Ireland	Arkansas	3:40.03	
5	Jerry Schumacher	Wisconsin	3:40.39	
6	Marcel Laros Netherlands	Texas-El Paso	3:40.80	
7	Matthew Holthaus	James Madison	3:41.73	
8	Paul McMullen	Eastern Michigan	3:44.30	

=== Men's 3000 meters steeplechase ===
- Only top eight final results shown; no prelims are listed

Rank	Name	University	Time	Notes
1st place, gold medalist(s)	Donovan Bergstrom	Wisconsin	8:29.08	
2nd place, silver medalist(s)	Jim Svenoy Norway	Texas-El Paso	8:29.18	
3rd place, bronze medalist(s)	Kurt Black	Weber State	8:29.25	
4	Francis O'Neill	Kansas State	8:29.64	
5	Martin Keino Kenya	Arizona	8:39.14	
6	Greg Metcalf	Washington	8:41.39	
7	George Yeannelis	Kentucky	8:42.74	
8	Dmitry Drozdov	Iowa State	8:43.40	

=== Men's 5000 meters ===
- Only top eight final results shown; no prelims are listed

Rank	Name	University	Time	Notes
1st place, gold medalist(s)	Jon Dennis United Kingdom	South Florida	13:59.00	
2nd place, silver medalist(s)	David Welsh	Arkansas	13:59.25	
3rd place, bronze medalist(s)	Frank Hanley Ireland	Arkansas	13:59.98	
4	Pablo Sierra Spain	Mississippi	14:00.73	
5	Jason Casiano	Wisconsin	14:01.38	
6	John Kihonge Kenya	Iowa State	14:02.61	
7	Cormac Finnerty Ireland	Clemson	14:08.60	
8	Todd Washburn	Navy	14:28.37	

=== Men's 10,000 meters ===
- Only top eight final results shown; no prelims are listed

Rank	Name	University	Time	Notes
1st place, gold medalist(s)	Jonah Koech Kenya	Iowa State	28:28.67	
2nd place, silver medalist(s)	Pablo Sierra Spain	Mississippi	29:07.88	
3rd place, bronze medalist(s)	Frank Hanley Ireland	Arkansas	29:14.17	
4	James H. Poser	East Tennessee State	29:36.21	
5	Steve Sisson	Texas	29:39.00	
6	David Welsh	Arkansas	29:46.09	
7	Connor Holt	Oklahoma	30:02.12	
8	Terrence Mahon	Villanova	30:10.42	

=== Men's 110 meters hurdles ===
- Only top eight final results shown; no prelims are listed

Wind=+1.51 mps

Rank	Name	University	Time	Notes
1st place, gold medalist(s)	Glenn Terry	Indiana	13.43	
2nd place, silver medalist(s)	Allen Johnson	North Carolina	13.47	
3rd place, bronze medalist(s)	Wagner Marseille Haiti	Fairleigh Dickinson	13.87	
4	Anthony Knight Jamaica	Clemson	13.89	
5	Jeff Jackson United States Virgin Islands	Baylor	14.07	
6	Marcus Dixon	Florida State	14.08	
7	Duane Ross	Clemson	14.08	
8	Jerry Roney	James Madison	14.62	

=== Men's 400 meters hurdles ===
- Only top eight final results shown; no prelims are listed

Rank	Name	University	Time	Notes
1st place, gold medalist(s)	Bryan Bronson	Rice	49.07	
2nd place, silver medalist(s)	Jordan Gray	Ohio State	49.10	
3rd place, bronze medalist(s)	Maurice Mitchell	Colorado	49.75	
4	Richard Murphy	Texas A & M	50.34	
5	Donovan Bassett	Mississippi	50.35	
6	Torrance Zellner	Florida	51.19	
7	Marcus Carter	Southern California	51.65	
8	Kevin Cripanuk	Penn State	52.01	

=== Men's 4x100-meter relay ===
- Only top eight final results shown; no prelims are listed

Rank	School	Competitors	Time	Notes
1st place, gold medalist(s)	Louisiana State University	Leg 1: Reggie Jones; Leg 2: Glenroy Gilbert Canada; Leg 3: Chris King; Leg 4: Fabian Muyaba Zimbabwe	38.70	
2nd place, silver medalist(s)	Texas Christian	Leg 1: Jimmy Oliver; Leg 2: Dennis Mowatt Jamaica; Leg 3: Brashant Carter; Leg 4: Mosia Abdallah	38.91	
3rd place, bronze medalist(s)	Ohio State	Leg 1: Butler Bynote; Leg 2: Chris Nelloms; Leg 3: Aaron Payne; Leg 4: Chris Sanders	39.14	
4	Oklahoma	Leg 1: Nathan Banks; Leg 2: Tod Long; Leg 3: Darrius Johnson; Leg 4: David Oaks	39.15	
5	Clemson	Leg 1: Michael Wheatley; Leg 2: Enayat Oliver; Leg 3: Trevor Gilbert; Leg 4: Michael Green Jamaica	39.34	
6	Kentucky	Leg 1: Demarcus Lindsey; Leg 2: D'Andre Jenkins; Leg 3: Clyde Rudolph; Leg 4: Tim Harden	39.47	
7	Arkansas	Leg 1: Chris Phillips; Leg 2: Jimmy French; Leg 3: Derrick Thompson; Leg 4: Vincent Henderson	39.79	
	Florida State	Leg 1: Jonathan Carter; Leg 2: Marcus Dixon; Leg 3: Kelsey Wash; Leg 4: Kevin Ansley	39.84	

=== Men's 4x400-meter relay ===
- Only top eight final results shown; no prelims are listed

Rank	School	Competitors	Time	Notes
1st place, gold medalist(s)	Ohio State	Leg 1: Rich Jones; Leg 2: Aaron Payne; Leg 3: Robert Smith; Leg 4: Chris Nelloms	3:00.82	
2nd place, silver medalist(s)	Baylor	Leg 1: Daniel Fredericks; Leg 2: Deon Minor; Leg 3: Tony Miller; Leg 4: Ethridge Green	3:01.22	
3rd place, bronze medalist(s)	Georgia Tech	Leg 1: Guy Robinson; Leg 2: Julian Amedee; Leg 3: Conrad Nichols; Leg 4: Derek Mills	3:02.10	
4	Mississippi	Leg 1: Brad Pride; Leg 2: Ed Odom; Leg 3: Donavan Bassett; Leg 4: Marcus Brooks	3:02.77	
5	Arkansas	Leg 1: Vincent Henderson; Leg 2: Jimmy French; Leg 3: Marion Boykins; Leg 4: Calvin Davis	3:03.61	
6	Rice	Leg 1: Chris Jones; Leg 2: Derek Gunnell; Leg 3: Bryan Bronson; Leg 4: Gabriel Luke	3:03.93	
7	Texas A & M	Leg 1: Stacy Zamzow; Leg 2: Tracy Bryant; Leg 3: Kiley Anglin; Leg 4: Richard Murphy	3:06.48	
	Illinois	Leg 1: Anthony Jones; Leg 2: Earl Jenkins; Leg 3: Ben Beyers; Leg 4: Scott Turner	3:45.60	

=== Men's high jump ===
- Only top eight final results shown; no prelims are listed

Rank	Name	University	Height	Notes
1st place, gold medalist(s)	Randy Jenkins	Tennessee	2.28 m (7 ft 5 3/4 in)	
2nd place, silver medalist(s)	Ray Doakes	Arkansas	2.25 m (7 ft 4 1/2 in)	
3rd place, bronze medalist(s)	Otis Winston	Ohio State	2.25 m (7 ft 4 1/2 in)	
4	Kevin Crist	Florida State	2.25 m (7 ft 4 1/2 in)	
5	Steve Smith	Indiana State	2.22 m (7 ft 3 1/4 in)	
6	Cameron Wright	Southern Illinois	2.22 m (7 ft 3 1/4 in)	
7	Peter Malesev	Nebraska	2.19 m (7 ft 2 in)	
8	Matt Hemingway	Arkansas	2.19 m (7 ft 2 in)	

=== Men's pole vault ===
- Only top eight final results shown; no prelims are listed

Rank	Name	University	Height	Notes
1st place, gold medalist(s)	Mark Buse	Indiana	5.60 m (18 ft 4 1/4 in)	
2nd place, silver medalist(s)	Adam Smith	Tennessee	5.60 m (18 ft 4 1/4 in)	
3rd place, bronze medalist(s)	Martin Erickson	Minnesota	5.50 m (18 ft 1/2 in)	
4	Justin Daler	Tennessee	5.50 m (18 ft 1/2 in)	
5	Nick Hysong	Arizona State	5.50 m (18 ft 1/2 in)	
6	Brit Pursley	Texas Tech	5.50 m (18 ft 1/2 in)	
7	David Cox United Kingdom; P. Jon Kelly	Fresno State; Arkansas State	5.50 m (18 ft 1/2 in)	

=== Men's long jump ===
- Only top eight final results shown; no prelims are listed

Rank	Name	University	Distance	Wind	Notes
1st place, gold medalist(s)	Erick Walder	Arkansas	8.53 m (27 ft 11 3/4 in)	+.034	
2nd place, silver medalist(s)	Dion Bentley	Florida	8.39 m (27 ft 6 1/4 in)	+0.79	
3rd place, bronze medalist(s)	Kareem Streete-Thompson Cayman Islands	Rice	8.31 m (27 ft 3 in)	+1.20	
4	Craig Hepburn Bahamas	Auburn	8.17 m (26 ft 9 1/2 in)	-0.03	
5	Chris Sanders	Ohio State	7.99 m (26 ft 2 1/2 in)	-4.14	
6	Anthuan Maybank	Iowa	7.93 m (26 ft 0 in)w	+2.67	(7.89 +1.83)
7	Reggie Jones	Louisiana State	7.93 m (26 ft 0 in)	+1.65	
8	Todd Trimble	Ohio State	7.92 m (25 ft 11 3/4 in)w	+2.94	(7.31 -0.08)

=== Men's triple jump ===
- Only top eight final results shown; no prelims are listed

Rank	Name	University	Distance	Wind	Notes
1st place, gold medalist(s)	Tyrell Taitt	North Carolina State	16.91 m (55 ft 5 1/2 in)w	+2.96	(16.40 +0.16)
2nd place, silver medalist(s)	Reggie Jones	Louisiana State	16.90 m (55 ft 5 1/4 in)	-1.15	
3rd place, bronze medalist(s)	Erick Walder	Arkansas	16.87 m (55 ft 4 in)w	+2.55	(16.51 +0.68)
4	LaMark Carter	Northwestern State	16.78 m (55 ft 1/2 in)	+0.69	
5	David Nti-Berko	Alabama	16.67 m (54 ft 8 1/4 in)w	+2.28	(16.47 -1.39)
6	Lotfi Khaida Algeria	Louisiana State	16.64 m (54 ft 7 in)	+0.80	
7	Antonio Davis	Penn State	16.61 m (54 ft 5 3/4 in)	+0.83	
8	Charles Rogers	UCLA	16.29 m (53 ft 5 1/4 in)	+1.39	

=== Men's shot put ===
- Only top eight final results shown; no prelims are listed

Rank	Name	University	Distance	Notes
1st place, gold medalist(s)	Brent Noon	Georgia	20.41 m (66 ft 11 1/2 in)	
2nd place, silver medalist(s)	John Godina	UCLA	20.03 m (65 ft 8 1/2 in)	
3rd place, bronze medalist(s)	Courtney Ireland New Zealand	Southern Methodist	19.25 m (63 ft 1 3/4 in)	
4	Rob Carlson	Tennessee	18.93 m (62 ft 1 1/4 in)	
5	Matt Simson United Kingdom	Florida	18.90 m (62 ft 0 in)	
6	Kevin Coleman	Nebraska	18.87 m (61 ft 10 3/4 in)	
7	Joe Bailey	UCLA	18.33 m (60 ft 1 1/2 in)	
8	Mark Parlin	UCLA	18.32 m (60 ft 1 1/4 in)	

=== Men's discus throw ===
- Only top eight final results shown; no prelims are listed

Rank	Name	University	Distance	Notes
1st place, gold medalist(s)	Brian Milne	Penn State	61.08 m (200 ft 4 in)	
2nd place, silver medalist(s)	Ramon Jimenez-Gaona	California	60.96 m (200 ft 0 in)	
3rd place, bronze medalist(s)	Gregg Hart	Indiana	59.86 m (196 ft 4 in)	
4	Andy Meyer	Nebraska	59.64 m (195 ft 8 in)	
5	Adam Setliff	Washington	59.40 m (194 ft 10 in)	
6	John Godina	UCLA	58.54 m (192 ft 0 in)	
7	John Wirtz	California	58.94 m (193 ft 4 in)	
8	Kjell Ove Hauge Norway	Texas-El Paso	55.88 m (183 ft 4 in)	

=== Men's hammer throw ===
- Only top eight final results shown; no prelims are listed

Rank	Name	University	Distance	Notes
1st place, gold medalist(s)	Balazs Kiss Hungary	Southern California	75.24 m (246 ft 10 in)	
2nd place, silver medalist(s)	Mika Laaksonen Finland	Texas-El Paso	71.20 m (233 ft 7 in)	
3rd place, bronze medalist(s)	Marko Wahlman Finland	Texas-El Paso	70.80 m (232 ft 3 in)	
4	Boris Stoikos Canada	Georgia	69.46 m (227 ft 10 in)	
5	Brian Murer	Southern Methodist	68.96 m (226 ft 2 in)	
6	Patrick McGrath Ireland	Manhattan	68.12 m (223 ft 5 in)	
7	Dave Paddison	Louisiana State	67.24 m (220 ft 7 in)	
8	Alex Papadimitriou Greece	Texas-El Paso	67.10 m (220 ft 1 in)	

=== Men's javelin throw ===
- Only top eight final results shown; no prelims are listed

Rank	Name	University	Distance	Notes
1st place, gold medalist(s)	Erik Smith	UCLA	79.20 m (259 ft 10 in)	
2nd place, silver medalist(s)	Derek Trafas Poland	Florida	73.44 m (240 ft 11 in)	
3rd place, bronze medalist(s)	Rodrigo Zelaya Chile	Texas Tech	71.70 m (235 ft 2 in)	
4	Brian Keane	Western Michigan	71.66 m (235 ft 1 in)	
5	Joakim Nilsson Sweden	Alabama	70.94 m (232 ft 8 in)	
6	Hans Schmidt	Georgia	69.86 m (229 ft 2 in)	
7	Charlie Cohen	Arizona State	69.66 m (228 ft 6 in)	
8	Oleg Krichenko	Arizona	69.62 m (228 ft 4 in)	

=== Men's decathlon ===
- Only top eight final results shown; no prelims are listed

Rank	Name	University	Points	Notes
1st place, gold medalist(s)	Chris Huffins	California	8007	
2nd place, silver medalist(s)	Ron Blums	Iowa State	7918	
3rd place, bronze medalist(s)	Matt Shelton	Tennessee	7736	
4	Jim Stevenson United Kingdom	Mount St. Mary's	7713	
5	Tommy Richards	Stephen F. Austin State	7702	
6	Mario Sategna	Louisiana State	7512	
7	Matt Dallas	Arizona	7466	
8	Dave Cook	Villanova	7327	

=== Women's 100 meters ===
- Only top eight final results shown; no prelims are listed

Wind=+0.33 mps

Rank	Name	University	Time	Notes
1st place, gold medalist(s)	Holli Hyche	Indiana State	11.14	
2nd place, silver medalist(s)	Beverly McDonald Jamaica	Texas Christian	11.25	
3rd place, bronze medalist(s)	Cheryl Taplin	Louisiana State	11.47	
4	Flirtisha Harris	Seton Hall	11.47	
5	Twilet Malcom Jamaica	Southwestern Louisiana	11.49	
6	Crystal Braddock	Texas	11.50	
7	Tisha Prather	Tennessee	11.51	
8	Faith Idehen Nigeria	Alabama	11.60	

=== Women's 200 meters ===
- Only top eight final results shown; no prelims are listed

Wind=+1.58 mps

Rank	Name	University	Time	Notes
1st place, gold medalist(s)	Holli Hyche	Indiana State	22.34	
2nd place, silver medalist(s)	Beverly McDonald Jamaica	Texas Christian	22.69	
3rd place, bronze medalist(s)	Flirtisha Harris	Seton Hall	23.02	
4	Kim Graham	Clemson	23.07	
5	Stacy Bowen Canada	Alabama	23.16	
6	Michele Collins	Houston	23.27	
7	Crystal Braddock	Texas	23.35	

=== Women's 400 meters ===
- Only top eight final results shown; no prelims are listed

Rank	Name	University	Time	Notes
1st place, gold medalist(s)	Juliet Campbell	Auburn	50.58	
2nd place, silver medalist(s)	Nelrae Pasha	Georgia Tech	51.68	
3rd place, bronze medalist(s)	Youlanda Warren	Louisiana State	51.92	
4	Shanelle Porter	Nebraska	52.12	
5	Camara Jones	Oregon	52.18	
6	Steffanie Smith	Georgetown	52.58	
7	Tanya Dooley	Fresno State	53.32	
8	Shanequa Campbell	Arizona State	53.40	

=== Women's 800 meters ===
- Only top eight final results shown; no prelims are listed

Rank	Name	University	Time	Notes
1st place, gold medalist(s)	Kim Sherman	Wisconsin	2:02.99	
2nd place, silver medalist(s)	Amy Wickus	Wisconsin	2:03.00	
3rd place, bronze medalist(s)	Kim Toney	Arizona State	2:03.23	
4	Jill Stamison	Western Michigan	2:03.65	
5	Vicky Lynch	Alabama	2:04.14	
6	Sarah Renk	Wisconsin	2:04.65	
7	Debbie Duplay	Kent State	2:06.54	
8	Ronise Crumpler	Pittsburgh	2:07.68	

=== Women's 1500 meters ===
- Only top eight final results shown; no prelims are listed

Rank	Name	University	Time	Notes
1st place, gold medalist(s)	Clare Eichner	Wisconsin	4:20.12	
2nd place, silver medalist(s)	Aaronda Watson	Georgetown	4:21.95	
3rd place, bronze medalist(s)	Erika Klein	Oregon	4:21.96	
4	Fran Ten Bensel	Nebraska	4:22.04	
5	Amy Rudolph	Wisconsin	4:22.13	
6	Sarah Renk	Wisconsin	4:22.27	
7	Vicky Lynch	Alabama	4:22.63	
8	Vibeke Tegneby Norway	Texas-El Paso	3:44.30	

=== Women's 3000 meters ===
- Only top eight final results shown; no prelims are listed

Rank	Name	University	Time	Notes
1st place, gold medalist(s)	Clare Eichner	Wisconsin	9:03.06	
2nd place, silver medalist(s)	Fran Ten Bensel	Nebraska	9:07.39	
3rd place, bronze medalist(s)	Lauren Gubicza	Fordham	9:12.03	
4	Nicole Woodward	Oregon	9:26.20	
5	Courtney Babcock Canada	Michigan	9:27.08	
6	Marieke Ressing Netherlands	Clemson	9:27.35	
7	Coralena Velsen	Florida	9:28.34	
8	Theresa Stelling	Nebraska	9:9:29.19	

=== Women's 5000 meters ===
- Only top eight final results shown; no prelims are listed

Rank	Name	University	Time	Notes
1st place, gold medalist(s)	Kay Gooch New Zealand	Oklahoma	16:31.02	
2nd place, silver medalist(s)	Molly McClimon	Michigan	16:33.38	
3rd place, bronze medalist(s)	Brenda Sleeuwenhoek Netherlands	Arizona	16:33.86	
4	Heather Warner	Alabama	16:34.57	
5	Tracy Jarman	Northern Arizona	16:35.47	
6	Shelley Smathers	Montana	16:37.48	
7	Shelley Taylor	Arkansas	16:43.06	
8	Marcie Homan	William and Mary	16:44.90	

=== Women's 10,000 meters ===
- Only top eight final results shown; no prelims are listed

Rank	Name	University	Time	Notes
1st place, gold medalist(s)	Carole Zajac	Villanova	34:18.14	
2nd place, silver medalist(s)	Caryn Landau	Georgetown	34:21.71	
3rd place, bronze medalist(s)	Christi Constantin	Georgetown	34:26.22	
4	Kelli Hunt	Penn State	34:53.72	
5	Kim Kelly	Penn State	34:55.95	
6	Katie Williams	Arizona	35:16.67	
7	Kristi Klinnert	Northern Arizona	35:18.55	
8	Michelle Byrne	Arkansas	35:25.37	

=== Women's 100 meters hurdles ===
- Only top eight final results shown; no prelims are listed

Wind=+2.38 mps

Rank	Name	University	Time	Notes
1st place, gold medalist(s)	Gillian Russell Jamaica	Miami	13.02	
2nd place, silver medalist(s)	Ime Akpan Nigeria	Arizona State	13.10	
3rd place, bronze medalist(s)	Monifa Taylor	Florida	13.13	
4	Tamika Higgins-Francis	Texas	13.23	
5	Tonja Buford	Illinois	13.29	
6	Kim Carson	Louisiana State	13.30	
7	Kuani Stewart	Nebraska	13.38	
8	H. Allison Williams	Pittsburgh	13.58	

=== Women's 400 meters hurdles ===
- Only top eight final results shown; no prelims are listed

Rank	Name	University	Time	Notes
1st place, gold medalist(s)	Debbie Ann Parris Jamaica	Louisiana State	56.37	
2nd place, silver medalist(s)	Tonja Buford	Illinois	56.91	
3rd place, bronze medalist(s)	Tonya Williams	Illinois	58.23	
4	Arnita Green	Ohio State	58.32	
5	Natasha Reynolds	Seton Hall	58.44	
6	Alison Poulin	New Hampshire	58.72	
7	Omolade Akinremi Nigeria	Arizona State	1:00.67	
8	Omotayo Akinremi Nigeria	Arizona State	1:03.83	

=== Women's 4x100-meter relay ===
- Only top eight final results shown; no prelims are listed

Rank	School	Competitors	Time	Notes
1st place, gold medalist(s)	Louisiana State University	Leg 1: Debbie Ann Parris Jamaica; Leg 2: Heather VanWorman; Leg 3: Youlanda Warren; Leg 4: Cheryl Taplin	43.49	
2nd place, silver medalist(s)	Alabama	Leg 1: Stacy Bowen Canada; Leg 2: Faith Idehen Nigeria; Leg 3: Fertacia Chapman; Leg 4: Andria Lloyd Jamaica	43.68	
3rd place, bronze medalist(s)	Auburn	Leg 1: Buffy James; Leg 2: Juliet Campbell; Leg 3: Claudine Finn; Leg 4: Cheryl-Ann Philips Jamaica	43.72	
4	Texas	Leg 1: Shantell Grant; Leg 2: Crystal Braddock; Leg 3: Tamika Higgins-Francis; Leg 4: Stacy Clack	44.07	
5	Illinois	Leg 1: Yolanda Baker; Leg 2: Janelle Johnson; Leg 3: Tonya Williams; Leg 4: Tonja Buford	44.13	
6	Houston	Leg 1: Janinna Courville; Leg 2: Cynthia Jackson; Leg 3: Dawn Burrell; Leg 4: Michelle Collins	44.20	
7	Tennessee	Leg 1: Dedra Davis Bahamas; Leg 2: Pat Leroy; Leg 3: Kim Townes; Leg 4: Tisha Prather	44.86	
8	Texas Southern	Leg 1: Yvette Cole; Leg 2: Sonya Shephard; Leg 3: Charlotte Green; Leg 4: Tracy Harris	45.10	

=== Women's 4x400-meter relay ===
- Only top eight final results shown; no prelims are listed

Rank	School	Competitors	Time	Notes
1st place, gold medalist(s)	Louisiana State University	Leg 1: Debbie Ann Parris Jamaica; Leg 2: Indira Hamilton; Leg 3: Heather VanWorman; Leg 4: Youlanda Warren	3:27.97	
2nd place, silver medalist(s)	Arizona State	Leg 1: Omolade Akinremi Nigeria; Leg 2: Omotayo Akinremi Nigeria; Leg 3: Kim Toney; Leg 4: Shanequa Campbell	3:30.47	
3rd place, bronze medalist(s)	Illinois	Leg 1: Tonya Williams; Leg 2: Katherine Williams; Leg 3: Janelle Johnson; Leg 4: Tonja Buford	3:30.98	
4	Georgetown	Leg 1: Bridget Johnson; Leg 2: Satanya Poole; Leg 3: Erica Stanley; Leg 4: Steffanie Smith	3:32.18	
5	Seton Hall	Leg 1: Julia Sandiford Barbados; Leg 2: Keisha Caine; Leg 3: Flirtisha Harris; Leg 4: Shane Williams	3:32.19	
6	UCLA	Leg 1: Shelly Tochluk; Leg 2: Shelia Burrell; Leg 3: Erin Blunt; Leg 4: Camille Noel Canada	3:32.62	
7	Houston	Leg 1: Drexel Long; Leg 2: Dawn Burrell; Leg 3: Cynthia Jackson; Leg 4: Michelle Collins	3:38.57	
8	Alabama	Leg 1: Celeste Jenkins; Leg 2: Michelle Morgan; Leg 3: Vicky Lynch Canada; Leg 4: Fertacia Chapman	3:40.36	

=== Women's high jump ===
- Only top eight final results shown; no prelims are listed

Rank	Name	University	Height	Notes
1st place, gold medalist(s)	Tanya Hughes	Arizona	1.92 m (6 ft 3 1/2 in)	
2nd place, silver medalist(s)	Gwen Wentland	Kansas State	1.92 m (6 ft 3 1/2 in)	
3rd place, bronze medalist(s)	Julieanne Broughton	Arizona	1.86 m (6 ft 1 in)	
4	Gai Kapernick Australia	Louisiana State	1.86 m (6 ft 1 in)	
5	Sherry Gould	Virginia	1.86 m (6 ft 1 in)	
6	Corissa Yasen	Purdue	1.83 m (6 ft 0 in)	
7	Crissy Mills	Southern California	1.83 m (6 ft 0 in)	
8	Shelly Choppa	Arizona State	1.80 m (5 ft 10 3/4 in)	

=== Women's long jump ===
- Only top eight final results shown; no prelims are listed

Rank	Name	University	Distance	Wind	Notes
1st place, gold medalist(s)	Daphnie Saunders Bahamas	Louisiana State	6.77 m (22 ft 2 1/2 in)	+0.63	
2nd place, silver medalist(s)	Dedra Davis Bahamas	Tennessee	6.63 m (21 ft 9 in)	+0.74	
3rd place, bronze medalist(s)	Shana Williams	Seton Hall	6.53 m (21 ft 5 in)	+1.66	
4	Camille Jackson	Louisiana State	6.47 m (21 ft 2 1/2 in)	+0.28	
5	Regina Frye	Indiana	6.32 m (20 ft 8 3/4 in)w	+2.50	(6.17 +1.98)
6	Cynthia Tylor	Auburn	6.22 m (20 ft 4 3/4 in)w	+3.36	(6.21 +0.97)
7	Trinette Johnson	Florida State	6.19 m (20 ft 3 1/2 in)	+1.44	(6.19)
8	Chantal Brunner New Zealand	Washington State	6.19 m (20 ft 3 1/2 in)	+0.62	(6.17)

=== Women's triple jump ===
- Only top eight final results shown; no prelims are listed

Rank	Name	University	Distance	Wind	Notes
1st place, gold medalist(s)	Claudia Haywood	Rice	13.54 m (44 ft 5 in)w	+4.24	(13.39 +0.37)
2nd place, silver medalist(s)	Roshanda Glenn	UCLA	13.35 m (43 ft 9 1/2 in)	+0.65	
3rd place, bronze medalist(s)	Leah Kirklin	Florida	13.32 m (43 ft 8 1/4 in)w	+2.70	(13.09 +1.92)
4	Christina Gray	Prairie View A&M	13.11 m (43 ft 0 in)	+1.43	
5	Camille Jackson	Louisiana State	13.00 m (42 ft 7 3/4 in)w	+2.35	(12.94 +0.88)
6	Telisa Young	Texas	12.90 m (42 ft 3 3/4 in)w	+3.84	(12.81 +1.96)
7	Jennifer McDermott	Georgetown	12.88 m (42 ft 3 in)	+1.23	
8	Tiombe Hurd	James Madison	12.87 m (42 ft 2 1/2 in)w	+3.08	(12.78 + 1.09)

=== Women's shot put ===
- Only top eight final results shown; no prelims are listed

Rank	Name	University	Distance	Notes
1st place, gold medalist(s)	Dawn Dumble	UCLA	17.17 m (56 ft 3 3/4 in)	
2nd place, silver medalist(s)	Stephanie Wadsworth Australia	Texas Christian	16.93 m (55 ft 6 1/2 in)	
3rd place, bronze medalist(s)	Melisa Weis	Colorado	16.49 m (54 ft 1 in)	
4	Danyel Mitchell	Louisiana State	16.23 m (53 ft 2 3/4 in)	
5	JoAnn Hacker	Southern Methodist	16.01 m (52 ft 6 1/4 in)	
6	Eileen Vanisi	Texas	15.83 m (51 ft 11 in)	
7	Jenni Whelchel	UCLA	15.66 m (51 ft 4 1/2 in)	
8	Valeyta Althouse	UCLA	15.56 m (51 ft 1/2 in)	

=== Women's discus throw ===
- Only top eight final results shown; no prelims are listed

Rank	Name	University	Distance	Notes
1st place, gold medalist(s)	Danyel Mitchell	Louisiana State	56.86 m (186 ft 6 in)	
2nd place, silver medalist(s)	Dawn Dumble	UCLA	55.82 m (183 ft 1 in)	
3rd place, bronze medalist(s)	Stacey Schroeder	Florida	54.90 m (180 ft 1 in)	
4	Melisa Weis	Colorado	51.92 m (170 ft 4 in)	
5	Styliani Tsikouna Greece	Texas-El Paso	51.82 m (170 ft 0 in)	
6	Alana Preston	Tennessee	51.18 m (167 ft 10 in)	
7	Julie Koeheke	Indiana State	50.76 m (166 ft 6 in)	
8	Sami Jo Williamson	Purdue	50.46 m (165 ft 6 in)	

=== Women's javelin throw ===
- Only top eight final results shown; no prelims are listed

Rank	Name	University	Distance	Notes
1st place, gold medalist(s)	Ashley Selman	Oregon	57.44 m (188 ft 5 in)	
2nd place, silver medalist(s)	Valerie Tulloch Canada	Rice	56.56 m (185 ft 6 in)	
3rd place, bronze medalist(s)	Heather Berlin	Minnesota	55.18 m (181 ft 0 in)	
4	Cindy Herceg	Florida	52.38 m (171 ft 10 in)	
5	Jenny McCormick Australia	Stanford	51.88 m (170 ft 2 in)	
6	Lynda Lipson	North Carolina	51.40 m (168 ft 7 in)	
7	Monika Parker	Washington	49.58 m (162 ft 7 in)	
8	Jenny Hockett	Texas-Arlington	48.52 m (159 ft 2 in)	

=== Women's heptathlon ===
- Only top eight final results shown; no prelims are listed

Rank	Name	University	Points	Notes
1st place, gold medalist(s)	Kelly Blair	Oregon	6038	
2nd place, silver medalist(s)	Sharon Jaklofsky Netherlands	Louisiana State	5892	
3rd place, bronze medalist(s)	Marieke Veltman	UCLA	5656	
4	Shana Williams	Seton Hall	5640	
5	Terry Roy	Connecticut	5556	
6	Denise Brungardt	Wichita State	5490	
7	Edwina Ammonds	Houston	5388	
8	Kalleen Madden	Texas A & M	5384	

== Team results ==
- Note: Top 10 only
- (H) = Hosts
- Full results

=== Men's standings ===
Rank	Team	Points
1st place, gold medalist(s)	Arkansas	69
2nd place, silver medalist(s)	LSU; Ohio State	45
4	Tennessee	44
5	Florida	39
6	UTEP	30
7	Indiana; Iowa State	26
9	UCLA	25
10	Clemson; Georgia; Rice	23

=== Women's standings ===
Rank	Team	Points
1st place, gold medalist(s)	LSU	93
2nd place, silver medalist(s)	Wisconsin	44
3rd place, bronze medalist(s)	UCLA	38
4	Oregon	35
5	Georgetown	32
6	Seton Hall	30
7	Illinois	28
8	Arizona State	26 1/2
9	Alabama; Arizona; Florida	25
