= 400 meters at the NCAA Division I Indoor Track and Field Championships =

This is a list of the NCAA Division I indoor champions in the 400 metres or its imperial equivalent 440 yards. The imperial distance was generally contested until 1983, while the metric distance has been held instead since 1984. The event was not held in 1986 and 1987. Hand timing was used until 1975 and in 1980, while during all other years since 1976 fully automatic timing was used. In 1986 and 1987, the 1/10-mile track that the races were run on was 25 inches (640 mm) per lap short, making the actual race distance less than 400 meters those years.

== Winners ==
=== Women ===
Women's 400m / 440yd winners
Year	Athlete	Team	Time
1983	Diane Dixon	Ohio State Buckeyes	53.47 y
1984	Ruth Nganga	Arizona Wildcats	54.21
1985	Lillie Leatherwood	Alabama Crimson Tide	53.12
1988	Terri Dendy	George Mason Patriots	52.57
1989	Natasha Kaiser	Missouri Tigers	51.92
1990	Maicel Malone	Arizona State Sun Devils	51.97
1991	Maicel Malone	Arizona State Sun Devils	51.05
1992	Maicel Malone	Arizona State Sun Devils	52.16
1993	Shanelle Porter	Nebraska Cornhuskers	52.82
1994	Flirtisha Harris	Seton Hall Pirates	52.11
1995	Youlanda Warren	LSU Lady Tigers	52.39
1996	Monique Hennagan	North Carolina Tar Heels	52.57
1997	LaTarsha Stroman	LSU Lady Tigers	52.77
1998	Suziann Reid	Texas Longhorns	52.57
1999	Suziann Reid	Texas Longhorns	51.68
2000	Aliann Pompey	Manhattan Jaspers	52.21
2001	Demetria Washington	South Carolina Gamecocks	52.37
2002	Allison Beckford	Rice Owls	52.16
2003	Lashinda Demus	South Carolina Gamecocks	51.79
2004	Sanya Richards	Texas Longhorns	50.82
2005	Tiandra Ponteen	Florida Gators	50.91
2006	Kineke Alexander	Iowa Hawkeyes	52.16
2007	Natasha Hastings	South Carolina Gamecocks	50.80
2008	Krista Simkins	Miami Hurricanes	52.16
2009	Francena McCorory	Hampton Pirates	51.55
2010	Francena McCorory	Hampton Pirates	50.54
2011	Jessica Beard	Texas A&M Aggies	50.79
2012	Diamond Dixon	Kansas Jayhawks	51.78
2013	Shaunae Miller	Georgia Bulldogs	50.88
2014	Phyllis Francis	Oregon Ducks	50.46 A
2015	Courtney Okolo	Texas Longhorns	51.12
2016	Courtney Okolo	Texas Longhorns	50.69
2017	Shakima Wimbley	Miami Hurricanes	51.07
2018	Kendall Ellis	USC Trojans	50.34
2019	Kaelin Roberts	USC Trojans	51.50
2021	Kaelin Roberts	USC Trojans	50.84
2022	Talitha Diggs	Florida Gators	50.98
2023	Britton Wilson	Arkansas Razorbacks	49.48 A
2024	Amber Anning	Arkansas Razorbacks	50.79
2025	Isabella Whittaker	Arkansas Razorbacks	49.24
2026	Dejanea Oakley	Georgia Bulldogs	50.47

=== Men ===
Key
y=yards
w=wind aided
A=Altitude assisted

==== 440 Yards ====
Year	Name, (Country)	Team	Time
1965	Theron Lewis	Southern-BR	47.8
1966	Bill Calhoun; Don Payne	Oklahoma; Kansas St	48.9
1967	Bill Calhoun	Oklahoma	48.9
1968	Larry James	Villanova	47.0
1969	Larry James	Villanova	47.3
1970	Larry James	Villanova	48.3
1971	Tom Ulan	Rutgers	48.8
1972	Larance Jones	NE Missouri St	48.3
1973	Terry Erickson	Southern Illinois	49.0
1974	Larance Jones	NE Missouri St	48.6
1975	Mike Sands Bahamas	Penn St	48.5
1976	Elvis Jennings	Mississippi St	48.42
1977	Willie Smith	Auburn	48.28
1978	Willie Smith	Auburn	48.28
1979	James Walker	Auburn	48.61
1980	Anthony Blair; Bert Cameron Jamaica	Tennessee; UTEP	48.7h
1981	Bert Cameron Jamaica	UTEP	48.23
1982	Anthony Ketchum	Houston	47.47
1983	Carlton Young	Villanova	47.17

==== 400 Meters ====
Men's 400m winners
Year	Athlete	Team	Time
1984	Antonio McKay	Georgia Tech	46.46
1985	Mike Franks	Southern Illinois	46.27
1986	not held		
1987	not held		
1988	Clifton Campbell	Auburn	46.40
1989	Tyrone Kemp	Florida	46.03
1990	Gabriel Luke	Rice	45.79
1991	Gabriel Luke	Rice	46.52
1992	Deon Minor	Baylor	46.17
1993	Wesley Russell	Clemson	45.92
1994	Calvin Davis	Arkansas	46.18
1995	Deon Minor	Baylor	46.00
1996	Greg Haughton Jamaica	George Mason	45.87
1997	Roxbert Martin Jamaica	Oklahoma	45.69
1998	Davian Clarke Jamaica	Miami FL	45.86
1999	Ato Modibo Trinidad and Tobago	Clemson	46.11
2000	Brandon Couts	Baylor	45.79
2001	Rickey Harris	Florida	45.78
2002	Alleyne Francique Grenada	LSU	45.58
2003	Gary Kikaya Democratic Republic of the Congo	Tennessee	45.71
2004	Jeremy Wariner	Baylor	45.39
2005	Kerron Clement	Florida	44.57
2006	Xavier Carter	Louisiana St	45.28
2007	Ricardo Chambers Jamaica	Florida State	45.65
2008	Andretti Bain Bahamas	Oral Roberts	46.19
2009	Michael Bingham United Kingdom	Wake Forest	45.69
2010	Torrin Lawrence	Georgia	45.23
2011	Demetrius Pinder Bahamas	Texas A&M	45.33
2012	Tony McQuay	Florida	45.77
2013	Errol Nolan	Houston	45.75
2014	Deon Lendore	Texas A&M	45.21
2015	Vernon Norwood	LSU	45.31
2016	Zack Bilderback	Texas	46.03
2017	Fred Kerley	Texas A&M	44.85
2018	Michael Norman	USC	44.52 WR
2019	Tyrell Richard	SC State	44.82
2021	Noah Williams	LSU	44.71
2022	Randolph Ross Jr.	North Carolina A&T Aggies	44.62
2023	Elija Godwin	Georgia Bulldogs	44.75
2024	Christopher Morales Williams	Georgia Bulldogs	44.67
2025	Will Floyd	Georgia Bulldogs	45.43
2026	Samuel Ogazi (NGR)	Alabama Crimson Tide	44.57
