= Wen Yang =

Wen Yang may refer to:

- Wen Yang (Three Kingdoms), Cao Wei military general during the Three Kingdoms period
- Wen Yang (chess player), Chinese chess player
- Wen Yong Yang, American track and field coach
