= 1941 USA Outdoor Track and Field Championships =

American athletics championship event

- Dates: 24–25 June (men); 5 July (women)
- Host city: Philadelphia, Pennsylvania (men); Ocean City, New Jersey (women)
- Venue: Franklin Field (men); Carey Stadium (women)
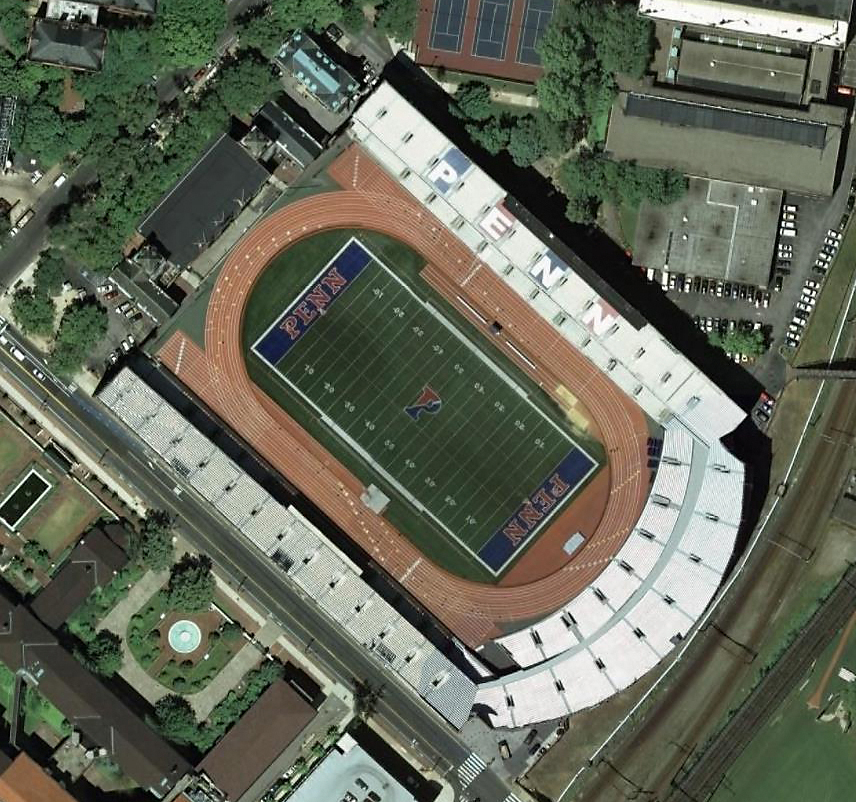

The 1941 USA Outdoor Track and Field Championships were organized by the Amateur Athletic Union (AAU) and served as the national championships in outdoor track and field for the United States.

The men's edition was held at Franklin Field in Philadelphia, Pennsylvania, and it took place 24–25 June. The women's meet was held separately at Carey Stadium in Ocean City, New Jersey, on 5 July.

They were the last championships before World War II. At the men's championships, Grover Klemmer broke the 400 m world record and Fred Wolcott tied the 110 m hurdles world record. At the women's competition, the schedule had to be changed due to poor weather, and Jean Lane surprised Stella Walsh to win the 100 m.

== Results ==
=== Men ===
Event	Gold		Silver		Bronze	
100 m	Norwood Ewell	10.3	Harold Davis	10.3	Payton Jordan	10.4
200 m straight	Harold Davis	20.4	Norwood Ewell	20.5	Payton Jordan	20.6
400 m	Grover Klemmer	46.0	Hubert Kerns	46.1	Cliff Bourland	46.1
800 m	Charles Beetham	1:50.2	John Borican	1:51.0	Clarence Barnes	
1500 m	Leslie MacMitchell	3:53.1	Walter Mehl	3:53.3	Edward Culp	
5000 m	Gregory Rice	14:39.7	Robert Madrid		Frederick Wilt	
10000 m	Lou Gregory	33:11.0	Theodore Volmer		Eino Pentti	
Marathon	Bernard Smith	2:36:06.3	Fred McGlone	2:36:16.6	John A. Kelley	2:38:26.0
110 m hurdles	Fred Wolcott	13.7	Joe Batiste	13.9	Robert Wright	
400 m hurdles	Oris Erwin	54.5	Harry March		Harry Jackson	
3000 m steeplechase	Forrest Efaw	9:13.7	Donald Munson		William Daly	
High jump	William Stewart	2.07 m	Lester Steers	2.07 m	Adam Berry	2.05 m
Pole vault	Cornelius Warmerdam	4.57 m	Earle Meadows	4.27 m	none awarded	
Pole vault	Cornelius Warmerdam	4.57 m	Guinn Smith	4.27 m	none awarded	
Long jump	Billy Brown	7.73 m	Clarence Lewis	7.33 m	Dallas Dupre	7.31 m
Triple jump	Billy Brown	15.53 m	Richard Rantz	14.16 m	Ruudi Toomsalu	13.94 m
Shot put	Alfred Blozis	16.48 m	Herbert Michael	15.57 m	Earl Audet	15.28 m
Discus throw	Archie Harris	51.14 m	Philip Fox	51.12 m	Albert Morro	49.37 m
Hammer throw	Irving Folwartshny	53.50 m	Stanley Johnson	52.64 m	Henry Dreyer	50.52 m
Javelin throw	Boyd Brown	66.52 m	Martin Biles	66.25 m	Lowell Todd	62.76 m
Decathlon	John Borican	5666 pts	Uyval Jones	5591 pts	Joshua Williamson	5236 pts
200 m hurdles	Fred Wolcott	22.8				
3000 m walk	Joseph Medgyesi	14:37.9				
Pentathlon	John Borican	3244 pts				
Weight throw for distance	Frank Berst	10.79 m				

=== Women ===
Event	Gold		Silver	Bronze
50 m	Lucy Newell	6.6	Jeanette Jones	Claire Isicson
100 m	Jean Lane	12.4	Alice Coachman	Rowena Harrison
200 m	Jean Lane	25.2	Stanislawa Walasiewicz (POL)	Esther Brown
80 m hurdles	Leila Perry	13.2	Lillie Purifoy	Hilda Plepis
High jump	Alice Coachman	1.59 m	Norma Jeffrey	Leila Perry
Long jump	Stanislawa Walasiewicz (POL)	5.66 m	Lucy Newell	Betty Charters
Shot put (8 lb)	Catherine Fellmeth	11.29 m	Dorothy Dodson	Hattie Hall
Discus throw	Stanislawa Walasiewicz (POL)	34.71 m	Evelyn Taylor	Catherine Fellmeth
Javelin throw	Dorothy Dodson	39.20 m	Marion Twining	Marie Sostar
Baseball throw	Angela Mica	260 ft 10 3/4 in (79.52 m)		

== See also ==
- List of USA Outdoor Track and Field Championships winners (men)
- List of USA Outdoor Track and Field Championships winners (women)
