= Wen Yong Yang =

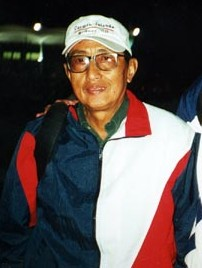
Wen Yong Yang

Wen Yong Yang (Chinese: 杨文永), also referred to as Wen Yang Yong or Wen Yeng Yang, is a track and field coach specializing in the high jump, long jump, and triple jump. After originally coaching for the Chinese Athletic Association, he later moved to Houston, Texas to coach the Rice Owls track and field team.

Yang began his career in the Chinese national sports system, serving as national coach from 1982 to 1986, during the inaugural 1983 World Championships in Athletics and the 1984 Summer Olympics. One of his athletes Zhu Jianhua set three consecutive world records in the high jump from 1983 to 1984, and won the bronze medal in the high jump at the 1984 Olympics.

Since immigrating to the United States in 1986, Yang became the jumps coach for the Rice Owls track and field team, leading his athletes to NCAA Division I championships, 29 All-American placings, and 25 conference titles. Yang's athletes hold every Rice school record in the jumps, including Kareem Streete-Thompson's outdoor long jump mark of 8.63 metres, which ranks him #8 all-time in the event.

Yang was called a "second father" of American long jumper Dawn Burrell and was used as an inspiration for her cooking as a chef. He also coached at the University of Houston.
