= Ed Red =

American javelin thrower

Personal information
- Born: March 6, 1942 (age 84) Kilgore, Texas, United States

Sport
- Sport: Athletics
- Event: Javelin throw

Walter Edward Red (born March 6, 1942) is an American athlete. He competed in the men's javelin throw at the 1964 Summer Olympics. Known as Ed Red, he had one of the shortest names of any Olympian.

Competing for the Rice Owls track and field team, Red finished 4th at the 1963 and 1964 NCAA University Division track and field championships.

== Personal life ==
Red is the brother-in-law of fellow Olympic javelin thrower, Richard George, and he is a member of the Church of Jesus Christ of Latter-day Saints.
