= John Uelses =

American pole vaulter (1937–2022)

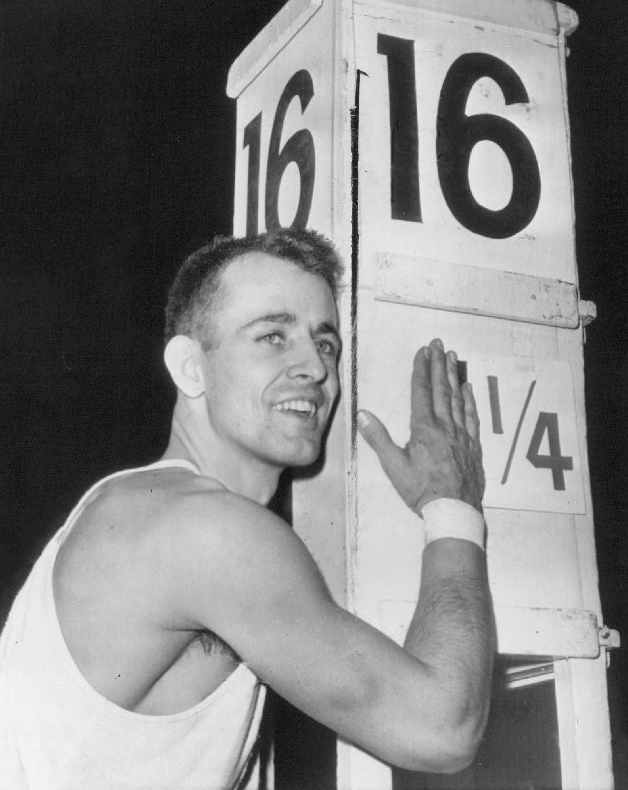
- Uelses in 1962

Personal information
- Born: Hans Joachim Feigenbaum; July 14, 1937 Berlin, Germany
- Died: December 15, 2022 (aged 85) San Diego, California, U.S.

Sport
- Sport: Athletics
- Event: Pole vault

Achievements and titles
- Personal best: 4.99 m (1964)

John Hans Uelses (born Hans Joachim Feigenbaum; July 14, 1937 – December 15, 2022) was an American pole vaulter. He made history by becoming the first man to vault over 16 feet – on February 2, 1962, at the Millrose Games in New York's Madison Square Garden, before a sold-out crowd, Uelses soared over the bar at 16' 1/4", making headlines around the world.

At the Boston Games, he broke his own indoor record, clearing the bar at 16' 3/4." His record-breaking jump in Madison Square Garden was upheld and both records stood. In the spring, the Marine Corps approved his travel to compete at the outdoor meet at Santa Barbara Relays in California. Uelses set a new world outdoor record at 16' 3/4". He would go on to achieve many more.

== Early life ==
Uelses was born Hans Joachim Feigenbaum in Berlin, Germany. He spent most of his early years as a refugee escaping from World War II with his mother, sister, and brother. His father was killed in Russia and the family ended up on the border of Denmark and Germany. Life was difficult for refugees in war-torn Europe and at 12, Uelses was sent to live with a great-aunt and uncle in Miami, Florida. He traveled alone with great anticipation. When he got off the plane in Miami, a new life began. (Thirteen years later, the mayor of Miami would be handing him the key to the city and proclaiming John Uelses Day.)

When he arrived in the U.S. he spoke no English and his education had been hindered by the war, so he was placed in 4th grade. He studied every night and practiced his English as much as possible, and soon caught with his age group.

His great-aunt and uncle eventually adopted him. His name became John Hans Uelses and he became a citizen of the United States of America.

== Career ==
Uelses went to Miami Senior High School where they had an outstanding athletic program. An all-around athlete, he was a star hurdler and high jumper and ran the 440 on track team and played on the football team while also an honor student. When he injured an ankle on the hurdles, someone suggested he try pole vaulting. He did, and was soon obsessed. He asked his adoptive father to help him build a vaulting pit in the backyard. He spent hours training and hanging by ropes from trees. He received most valuable track athlete his junior year in high school.

Upon graduation he received a scholarship to the University of Alabama. There he set university records and won Southeastern Conference titles in pole vault, javelin, and hurdles. It was the time of Bear Bryant and football was king. Uelses longed for big meets and competition. While competing for the track team at Alabama, he heard about a U.S. Marine track and field program where he could compete in large national and international events. The Marines delivered on their promise: soon he was at Quantico training for the Marines and the competition he was seeking. He told a reporter he might be the only Marine who looked forward to boot camp.

Uelses, one of the first vaulters to jump on a fiberglass pole, made this new style of vaulting the standard for future vaulters. His historic jump at the Millrose Games at Madison Square Garden made headlines around the world and landed him on the February 26, 1962 cover of Sports Illustrated. The article inside headlined "He Could Do It on Bamboo." Some purists complained that the fiberglass pole was an acrobatic circus stunt, and called the pole a gimmick. Sports Illustrated decided to put poles to the test using fiberglass, steel, bamboo and aluminum. They concluded that fiberglass and bamboo were the most efficient pole materials, but that athletic concentration, speed, skill and style were what made the records.

At the time of his first record-breaking jumps, Uelses was a corporal in the U.S. Marines stationed in Quantico, Virginia. He was also a member of the U.S. track team, traveling and competing all over world. He vaulted and won medals in Brussels, Russia, Poland, Finland, Japan, Germany, and England. In 1961 he won the World Military Outdoor Championship in Brussels. He was part of the USA vs USSR cold war matches. His first place win in 1963 in Moscow, despite an injury, was particularly satisfying to him. He also was selected to participate in a goodwill exhibition tour of Africa sponsored by the State Department.

Uelses learned the art of bending the fiberglass pole at Quantico from Aubrey Dooley. Uelses had a unique style of vaulting with a shorter run up than most other vaulters. Dooley attributed Uelses's short run up to his speed: he could reach his top-end speed in that shorter distance. In another unique move, Uelses would bend his pole backward, away from the pit. But it was his determination that was most significant.

John Uelses pole vaulting, 1964. Photo by Harold E. Edgerton, MIT.

After his tour with the Marines, Uelses received a scholarship to La Salle University in Philadelphia. He was a member of the Explorer track team. He won the NCAA pole vault championship in 1964 with an American Indoor Record of 16 4 1/2 ", as well as three IC4A championships and two MAC championships. He was an NCAA All American. Uelses also played soccer at La Salle.

Upon graduating from La Salle, Uelses served as a United States Naval Officer and aviator. After completing flight training, he served as a member of the F-4 Phantom Fighter squadrons and instructor at training commands. He was selected for the first F14 Tomcat Fighter Squadron VF-1 stationed in California. Uelses' fighter squadrons were on the USS Ranger and the USS Enterprise. After graduating from Naval War College in Newport, he was stationed with US European Command in Stuttgart, Germany, and Naval Air Systems Command in Washington DC.

After retiring, Uelses and his wife returned to California to be close to their family. He continued his love of track and vaulting by serving as vaulting coach in high schools until 2008.

Uelses has been inducted into U.S. Track and Field Pole Vault Hall of Fame, Florida Sports Hall of Fame, La Salle Hall of Fame, and Miami Senior High Hall of Fame.

== Death ==
Uelses died in San Diego on December 15, 2022, of complications from Alzheimer's disease. He was 85.

== Achievements ==
1962

- Jan 21, Washington, D.C. – 4.83 m (15'10¼") World Record
- Feb 2, Millrose Games, New York – 4.88 m (16'1/4") World Record
- Feb 9, Boston Indoor Games, Massachusetts – 4.89 m (16'3/4") World Record
- Mar 31, Santa Barbara Easter Relays, Santa Barbara, California – 4.89 m (16'¾") World Record

1964

- 1st place USA Indoor Track and Field Championships – 4.72 m (16'4 1/2")
- 1st place NCAA Track and Field Outdoor Championships – 4.87 m (16 ft 0 in)
- NCAA All-American

Records
| Preceded by (United States) George Davies | Men's Pole Vault World Record Holder; March 31, 1962 – April 28, 1962 | Succeeded by (United States) Dave Tork |
