= Richard George (javelin thrower) =

American javelin athlete (born 1953)

Personal information
- Born: Richard Lloyd George; May 22, 1953 (age 73) Fillmore, Utah, U.S.
- Education: Millard High School
- Height: 1.93 m (6 ft 4 in)
- Weight: 91 kg (201 lb)

Sport
- Sport: Track and field
- Event: Javelin throw
- University team: Brigham Young University Cougars

Achievements and titles
- Personal best: 83.84 m (275 ft 1 in)

Richard Lloyd George (born May 22, 1953, in Fillmore, Utah) is an American former javelin thrower. He represented the United States at the 1976 Summer Olympics.

George went to Brigham Young University, earning a BA in Economics and Harvard Business School, earning an MBA. A member of the Church of Jesus Christ of Latter-day Saints, he played football for the BYU Cougars as a freshman but focused on track and field after returning from his church mission. At the 1976 Summer Olympics, he completed a warm-up throw that would have won second place in the finals, but did not end up qualifying for the finals. In 2012, George became an Honoree in the Utah Sports Hall of Fame.

George served as Vice President of Southern Virginia University and was the CEO of General Resonance LLC and Clene NanoMedicine Inc. His son Andrew also played football for the BYU Cougars and he is the brother-in-law of Ed Red, another Olympic javelin thrower.
