= Gawain Guy =

Jamaican middle-distance runner

Personal information
- Born: 28 January 1962 (age 64) Colony of Jamaica, British Empire
- Height: 173 cm (5 ft 8 in)
- Weight: 58 kg (128 lb)

Sport
- Country: Jamaica
- Sport: Middle-distance running

Gawain Guy is a Jamaican Olympic middle-distance runner. He represented his country in the men's 1500 meters at the 1984 Summer Olympics. His time was a 3:52.05 in the first heat.

Guy was the first sub-four-minute miler for the Rice Owls track and field team.
