= 1928 NCAA Track and Field Championships =

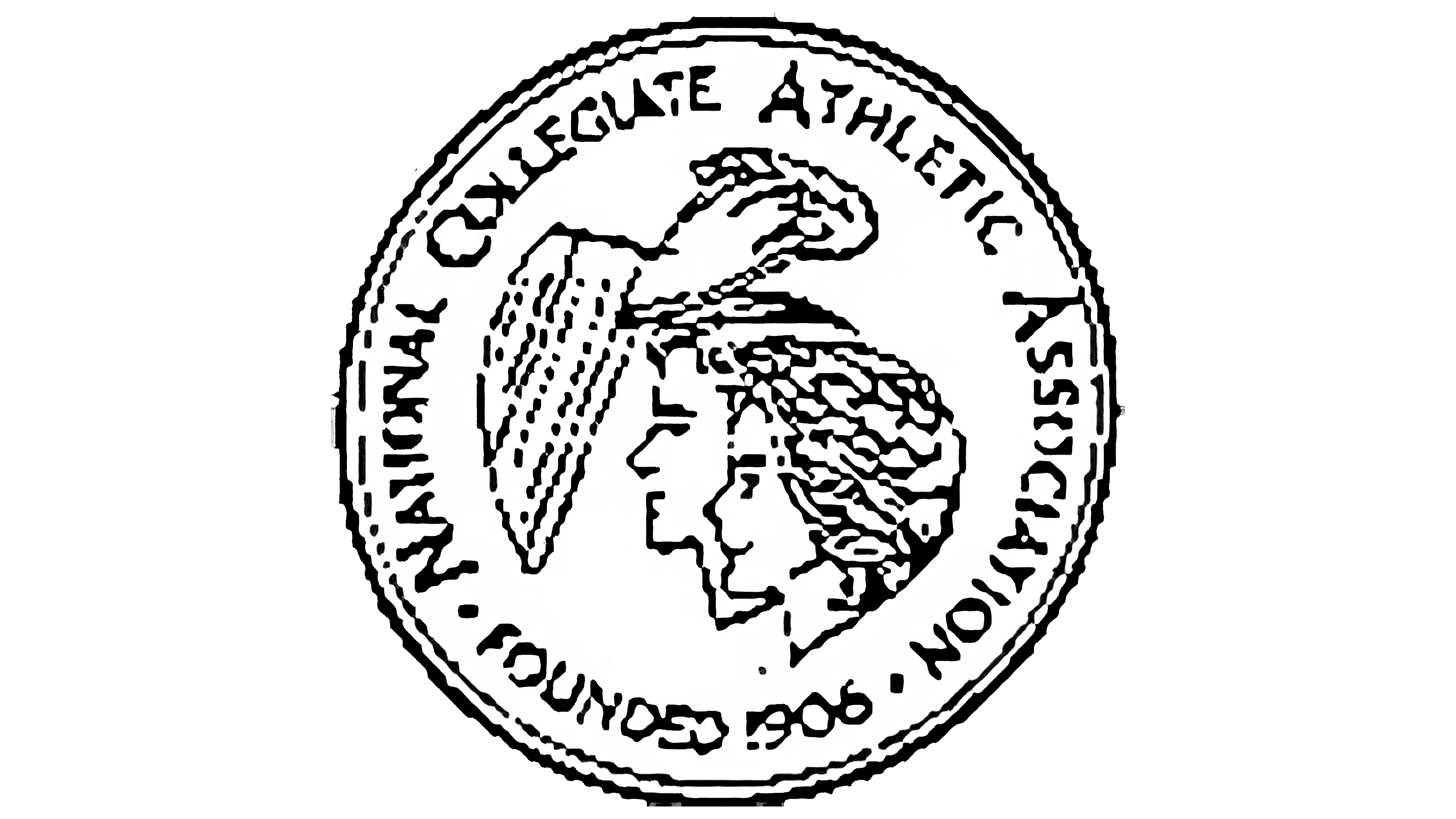
- Team Champion: Stanford (2nd title)
- Edition: 7th
- Dates: June 8-9, 1928
- Host city: (Illinois) Chicago, Illinois; University of Chicago
- Venue: Soldier Field
- Events: 14

The 1928 NCAA Track and Field Championships was the seventh NCAA track and field championship. The meet was held at Soldier Field in Chicago, Illinois in June 1928.

== Team championship ==
Rank	Team	Points
1st place, gold medalist(s)	Stanford	72
2nd place, silver medalist(s)	Illinois	30 3/4
3rd place, bronze medalist(s)	Ohio State	30
4	Washington	26
5	Iowa; Rice	25
7	Northwestern	24
8	Michigan	22
9	Pittsburgh	16
10	Ohio Wesleyan	15

== Track events ==
100-yard dash
1. Claude Bracey, Rice Institute 9.3
2. George Simpson, Ohio St.
3. Wes Foster, Washington St.
4. George Hester, Michigan
5. Arthur Engle, Iowa St.
6. Hermansen, Northwestern

120-yard high hurdles
1. Dwight Kane, Ohio Wesleyan 14.7
2. Morris Penquite, Drake
3. Harold Trumble, Nebraska
4. Ralph Pahlmeyer, Wisconsin
5. Don Cooper, Michigan
6. Percy Beard, Alabama Poly

220-yard dash
1. Claude Bracey, Rice Institute 20.9
2. George Simpson, Ohio State
3. H.L. Henson, Michigan State 4. Arthur Engle, Iowa St.
5. Root, Chicago
6. Lambacher, Ohio Wesleyan

220-yard low hurdles
1. Frank Cuhel, Iowa 23.2
2. Steve Anderson, Washington
3. Don Cooper, Michigan
4. Edwin Spence, College of City of Detroit
5. Dwight Kane, Ohio Wesleyan
6. Richard Rockaway, Ohio St.

440-yard dash
1. Emerson Spencer, Stanford 47.7
2. Russell Walter, Northwestern
3. Snitz Snider, Alabama Poly
4. George Baird, Iowa
5. Strong College, of City of Detroit
6. Ernest Knotz, Georgia Tech

880-yard run
1. Virgil Gist, Chicago 1:54.4
2. Hal White, Illinois
3. Robert Orlovich, Illinois
4. Emmett Brunson, Rice Institute
5. Lindus Caulum, Iowa St.
6. Gorby, Northwestern

One-mile run
1. Rufus Kiser, Washington 4:17.3
2. Leroy Potter, Michigan Normal
3. Hanson, Oregon St.
4. Galen Elliott, North Carolina
5. Frank Stine, Illinois
6. Harold Fields, Indiana

Two-mile run
1. David Abbott, Illinois 9:28.8
2. D. Cleaver, Idaho
3. Poco Frazier, Kansas
4. Haworth, Penn
5. William Clapham, Indiana
6. Charles Bullamore, Wisconsin

== Field events ==
Broad jump
1. Ed Hamm, Georgia Tech 25 feet, 0 inches
2. Dyer, Stanford
3. Striff, Oregon St.
4. Rice, College of Ozarks
5. Tom Humes, Washington
6. Cyrus Spangler, Kansas

High jump
1. Bob King, Stanford 6 feet, 4 1/2 inches
2. Parker Shelby, Oklahoma
3. Warren Anson, Ohio St.
4. Robert Carr, Illinois
4. Summerfield Brunk, Drake
4. Frey, Chicago
4. Jack Cline, Central Michigan

Pole vault
1. Ward Edmonds, Stanford 13 feet, 6 1/2 inches
2. William Droegemueller, Northwestern
3. Vic Pickard, Pittsburgh
4. Frank Glaser, Marquette
4. J.B. O'Dell, Clemson
4. Harold McAtee, Michigan St.
4. Weldon Cabaness, Rice Institute
4. Norman Heinsen, Illinois
4. Albright, Coe

Discus throw
1. Eric Krenz, Stanford 149 feet, 2 inches
2. Leo Baldwin, Texas
3. Peter Rasmus, Ohio St.
4. Lorin Hagerty, Iowa
5. Welch, Pittsburgh
6. Emerson Nelson, Iowa

Javelin
1. Lee Bartlett, Albion 216 feet, 7 inches
2. Goode, McKendree
3. Rice, College of the Ozarks
4. Kibby, Stanford
5. George Mackinnon, Minnesota
6. Sparling, Stanford

Shot put
1. Harlow Rothert, Stanford 49 feet, 10 3/4 inches
2. Eric Krenz, Stanford
3. Herman Brix, Washington
4. White, Kansas St. Teach.
5. Daniel Lyon, Illinois
6. Foster, Stanford

Hammer throw
1. Wilford Ketz, Michigan 163 feet, 8 3/4 inches
2. Donald Gwinn, Pittsburgh
3. Justin Dart, Northwestern
4. Emerson Nelson, Iowa
5. Vern Lapp, Iowa
6. Joseph Ujhelyi, Ohio St.

== See also ==
- NCAA Men's Outdoor Track and Field Championship
