= Wilford Ketz =

Wilford H. Ketz
- Ketz, c. 1928
- Born: May 4, 1906; Detroit, United States
- Died: February 26, 1991 (aged 84); DeLand, Florida, United States
- Known for: NCAA champion, hammer throw (1928); NCADA Hall of Fame (1978); UM Track & Field Hall of Fame (2012); George Eldridge Distinguished Service Award (1970); James Lynah Memorial Award (1976)

Wilford H. Ketz (May 4, 1906 – February 26, 1991) was an American track and field athlete and athletic administrator. As a member of the Michigan Wolverines men's track and field team, he was a two-time All-American and won the 1928 NCAA Championship in the hammer throw. He worked for Union College in Schenectady, New York from 1931 to 1971, holding positions as the track and cross country coach (1931–1967), athletic director (1953–1969), and director of institutional studies (1960–1971). He also served as the president of the IC4A and on the executive committee of the NCAA. He was inducted into the National Collegiate Association of Directors of Athletics (NCADA) Hall of Fame in 1978. In 2012, he was inducted into the University of Michigan Track and Field Hall of Fame.

== University of Michigan ==
Ketz was born in Detroit in 1906. He attended the University of Michigan where he received both a bachelor's degree in 1929 and an LL.B. degree in 1931. While attending Michigan, he was a member of the Michigan Wolverines men's track and field team and a two-team All-American. He won the hammer throw event with a distance of 163 feet, 8¾ inches at the 1928 NCAA Men's Track and Field Championships. He also finished second in the event at the 1929 NCAA Championships and fourth at the 1927 NCAA Championships.

Ketz also played college football at the tackle position for the 1927 Michigan Wolverines football team. He also served as an assistant track coach while studying at the law school from 1929 to 1931. In 2012, he was inducted into the University of Michigan Track and Field Hall of Fame.

== Union College ==
After receiving his degrees from Michigan, Ketz was employed by Union College for 40 years from 1931 to 1971. He was hired as the college's track and cross country coach and held that position until 1967. He became the college's athletic director in 1953 and held that post until 1969. He held various other positions at Union College, including head of the department of physical education (starting in 1956), director of admissions (1942–45), assistant to the dean (1945-1946), veterans counselor (1942–53), and coordinator of student activities (1946–54). From 1960 until his retirement in 1971, he was Union College's director of institutional studies. He also served as the president of the IC4A and served on the executive committee of the NCAA. In 1963, he drafted the constitution for the College Athletic Business Managers Association (CABMA).

Ketz received numerous awards for his contributions to collegiate athletics. In 1970, he received CABMA's George Eldridge Distinguished Service Award, and in 1976, he received the James Lynah Memorial Award from the Eastern College Athletic Conference. He was also inducted into the National Collegiate Association of Directors of Athletics (NCADA) Hall of Fame in 1978.

== Later years ==
In 1978, Ketz moved from Schenectady to DeLand, Florida. He was an adjunct professor at Daytona Beach Community College until he retired in 1989. He died in 1991 at age 84 in DeLand.
