= Vern McGrew =

American high jumper

Personal information
- Born: Verne Voorhees McGrew, Jr. December 7, 1929 Big Spring, Texas, United States
- Died: January 9, 2012 (aged 82) Houston, Texas, United States

Sport
- Sport: Track and field
- Event: High jump

Vern McGrew (December 7, 1929 – January 9, 2012) was an American high jumper. He competed in the high jump event at the 1948 Summer Olympics at the age of eighteen. He used the western roll technique, which was common at the time, and in 1948 achieved a career best clearance of 2.04 meters (6 ft 8¼ in).

Born in Big Spring, Texas, he went on to attend Lamar High School in Houston, graduating in 1946. That year he won the Texan state championship with a state record jump. He gained a place at Rice University and competed for the Rice Owls athletic team under their coach Emmett Brunson. McGrew became the second Rice alumnus to take part in an Olympic event, after Claude Bracey in 1928.

The 1948 Olympics was his only major international appearance but he achieved some success at national level. While studying at Rice University he competed at the NCAA Championship, coming third in 1948 and finishing as runner-up in 1949. He completed this upward trend by winning the NCAA high jump title in 1950 with a jump of over two meters (6 ft 7 in). At the national-level AAU Championship meeting he was third in 1948 (where he gained Olympic selection), but managed only fifth place the year after.

McGrew undertook post-graduate study at the University of Texas and later the University of Texas Law School. He signed up for military service from 1954 to 1956. He did not take part in athletics in his later life and instead used his studies to gain a placement at Humble Oil, at which he spent 30 years of his working life. He retired in the 1980s and lived until the age of 82. He died at Methodist Hospital in Houston.
