= Evan Karakolis =

Canadian javelin thrower (born 1994)

Personal information
- Born: 30 March 1994 (age 32) Scarborough, Ontario, Canada

Sport
- Sport: Track and field
- Event: Javelin throw

Evan Karakolis (born 30 March 1994) is a Canadian javelin thrower who holds the school record at Rice University (79.30 meters (260.2 ft)). As well as being team captain of the 2015–2016 Rice Track and Field Team, Karakolis received the Bob Quin Award for both athletic and academic excellence. Karakolis competed for Canada at the 2011 World Youth Championship in Lille, France, and finished eighth in qualifying. He holds a master's degree in mechanical engineering from the University of Toronto.

In 2016, Karakolis won the javelin event at the Canadian Track and Field Championships and Canadian Olympic Trials with a throw of 71.77 meters (235.5 ft). However, this distance fell below the Olympic qualifying standard of 83.00 meters (272.31 ft) and thus did not qualify him the 2016 Olympic Games in Rio de Janeiro.

In 2017, Karakolis won the javelin event at the Canadian Track and Field Championships for the second consecutive year with a throw of 73.71 meters (241.8 ft).

In 2018, Karakolis's throw of 73.10 meters (239.8 ft) in the javelin finals at the Canadian Track and Field Championships earned him a third straight gold medal in the event.
