= Ward Edmonds =

American pole vaulter (1908–1930)

Rowland Ward Edmonds (July 3, 1908 – October 26, 1930) was an American pole vaulter. He was one of the first men to vault 14 feet (4.26 m) and was NCAA champion in 1928 and 1929. After graduating from Stanford University he started working for the Bank of Italy, but died from polio aged 22.

== Biography ==
Edmonds was born in San Diego, California on July 3, 1908, the son of Warner Edmonds, a wealthy banker, and Martha Edmonds (née Ward). He attended Stanford University, where he was coached by Dink Templeton. At the 1927 IC4A championships he cleared 13 ft 6 in (4.11 m), placing third as Stanford won the team title; Yale's Sabin Carr broke the world record and became the first man to vault 14 ft (4.26 m), while 1924 Olympic champion Lee Barnes cleared 13 ft 9 1/2 in (4.20 m) for second. The following week Edmonds placed second to Barnes at the Pacific Coast Conference championships, helping Stanford beat Barnes's University of Southern California for that team title by two points.

At the 1928 West Coast Relays in Fresno Barnes and Edmonds became the second and third vaulters in the world to clear 14 ft (4.26 m), equaling Carr's outdoor world record. Barnes then cleared the next height, 14 ft 1 3/4 in (4.31 m), on his third and final attempt to break the record; Edmonds also had good attempts at the record height, but was not successful. There were originally some doubts about the legitimacy of these marks; Barnes's jump (revised down to 14 ft 1 1/2 in / 4.30 m) was rejected as a record in 1928 because the pegs had been the wrong length, but in 1929 it was officially approved.

Edmonds won the 1928 NCAA championship, jumping a meeting record 13 ft 6 1/2 in (4.13 m) and defeating the previous year's champion, Northwestern's Bill Droegemueller. He was heavily favored to qualify for the American Olympic team, but at the Olympic Trials in Cambridge he failed to clear 13 ft 6 in (4.11 m) and the four Olympic spots went to Carr, Barnes, Droegemueller and Charles McGinnis.

In 1929, his final year at Stanford, Edmonds shared first place at the IC4A championships, clearing 13 ft 9 in (4.19 m). He also repeated as NCAA champion, improving his own meeting record to 13 ft 8 7/8 in (4.18 m) and sharing first place with Tom Warne.

In addition to pole vaulting, Edmonds took up the hurdles in 1929, defeating his Stanford teammate and 1928 IC4A hurdles champion Ross Nichols in several trial races. He was also captain of the Stanford golf team. After graduating Edmonds started working for the Bank of Italy while continuing his athletic career, but he contracted polio and died in the Stanford University Hospital in San Francisco on October 26, 1930, aged 22.
