= George Davies (athlete) =

American pole vaulter

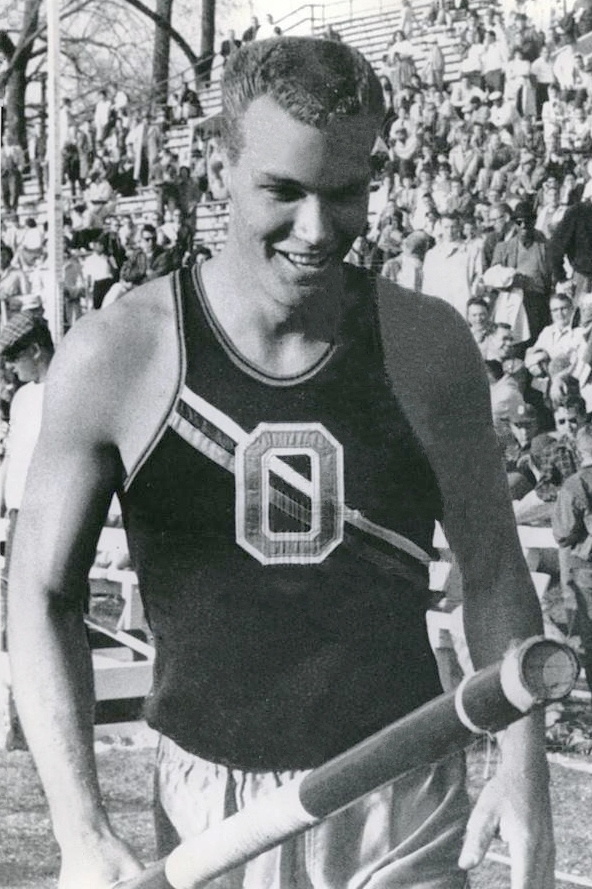
- Davies in 1961

Personal information
- Born: November 19, 1940 (age 85)

Sport
- Sport: Athletics
- Event: Pole vault

Achievements and titles
- Personal best: 4.83 m (1961)

George Davies (born November 19, 1940) is an American retired pole vaulter and a former world record holder. He set his record on May 20, 1961, in Boulder, Colorado, jumping 4.83 m (15 ft 10.2 in). He was the first pole vaulter to break a world record with a fiberglass pole.

Competing for the Oklahoma State Cowboys track and field team, Davies won the 1961 NCAA Division I Outdoor Track and Field Championships. He tied for first place with Dick Gear of San Jose State.

Records
Preceded by (United States) Don Bragg	Men's Pole Vault World Record Holder; May 20, 1961 – March 31, 1962	Succeeded by (United States) John Uelses
