= Chris Jones (sprinter) =

American sprinter (born 1973)

Personal information
- Born: October 8, 1973 (age 52)

Sport
- Sport: Track and field
- Club: Rice Owls
Medal record
Representing United States
Summer Universiade
| Gold medal – first place | 1993 Buffalo | 4x400m relay |

Chris Jones (born October 8, 1973) is an American former sprinter.

Running for the Rice Owls track and field team, Jones finished 2nd in the 400 m at the 1994 indoor and 1994 NCAA Division I Outdoor Track and Field Championships.
