= Claude Bracey =

American sprinter (1909–1940)

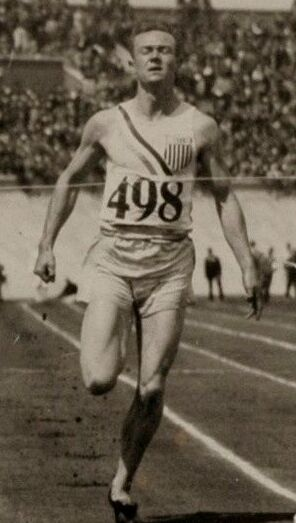

Personal information
- Full name: Claude Odell Bracey Jr.
- Nickname: Texas Flyer
- Nationality: American
- Born: Claude Odell Bracey Jr. June 8, 1909 Humble, Texas
- Died: September 23, 1940 (aged 31) Buckeye, Arizona
- Height: 6’

Sport
- Sport: Running
- Event: 100 yards (91 m) dash
- College team: Rice Institute
- Team: Rice Owls
- Retired: 1932

Achievements and titles
- Olympic finals: 1928 Summer Olympics
- Highest world ranking: 9.6 seconds in the 100-yard race at the 1928 NCAA Men's Track and Field Championships

Claude Bracey (June 8, 1909 – September 23, 1940), known variously as the "Texas Flyer," the "Dixie Flyer," and the "Texas Tornado," was an American sprinter who tied world records in the 100-yard and 100-meter races between 1928 and 1932. He competed for the United States at the 1928 Summer Olympics in Amsterdam and also won the 100-yard and 220-yard sprints at the 1928 NCAA Men's Track and Field Championships.

== Early life ==
Bracey grew up in Humble, Texas and attended Humble High School. As a boy, he participated in games of "hare-and-hound," in which the children would chase each other from one end of town to the other. Bracey was so fast that rival sides would quarrel over who which side would have him. He gained prominence as a runner at Humble High.

== Rice University ==
Bracey attended Rice Institute located in Houston, Texas. He competed in intercollegiate track for the Rice Owls from 1927 to 1930 and for the United States at the 1928 Summer Olympics in Amsterdam. He was regarded as "the first man to bring Rice Institute athletic fame." Bracey was considered a "big and rangy" runner. Between 1928 and 1929, he gained weight and was reported in 1929 to be six feet tall and approximately 160 pounds. In 1929, Bracey described his minimalist approach to training as follows:

"Sprinters are born, not made, and running comes natural with me. As long as I take care of myself and eat reasonably, I get along fine. I don't train any during the summer. That's vacation time and I make it that by spending those weeks fishing. Laying off like that doesn't bother me. After all, a dash man doesn't need much wind. I only take two or three breaths in 100 yards."

A feature story published in 1929 described Bracey as "almost a recluse," a quiet person who rarely left campus, never wears formal clothes, and "thinks society is all wet."

== Championships and records ==
In June 1928, Bracey won both sprint events at the 1928 NCAA Men's Track and Field Championships with times of 9.6 seconds in the 100-yard race and 20.9 seconds in the 220-yard race. He was the first athlete from Rice to win an NCAA track championship in any event, and it was 1938 before another Rice athlete (Fred Wolcott) accomplished the feat.

He qualified for the U.S. Olympic team in 1928 and traveled with the team to the 1928 Summer Olympics in Amsterdam. He finished fifth in the semifinals of the 100-meter race at the Olympic games with a time of 10.8 seconds. He was the first Rice athlete to compete in the Olympic games; it was 1948 before another Rice athlete competed in the Olympics.

At the Texas Relays in March 1929, Bracey tied the world record in the 100-yard sprint with a time of 9.5 seconds. The next day, he ran the event in 9.4 seconds, but the record was not recognized due to wind conditions. Football coach Knute Rockne officiated the sprint event in which Bracey's world record was disallowed due to wind conditions. Rockne told reporters that Bracey was the best sprinter he had seen and added: "Bracey is a streak. He is as good as any of them off the marks and runs the last 40 yards faster than any man I ever saw. He had the wind with him when he did 9.4 at Dallas but on both that occasion and the day before he beat George Simpson of Ohio State by about four yards. You all know how good Simpson is."

At the 1929 NCAA Men's Track and Field Championships, Bracey lost his title in the sprint events as Ohio State's George Simpson won both events, and Bracey finished second in the 100-yard race and third in the 220-yard event.

Bracey continued to compete through 1932. He tied the world record in the 100-meter race with a time of 10.4 seconds in June 1932. In July 1932, he qualified in the preliminaries of the 100-meter and 200-meter events at the Far Western Olympic team trials at Long Beach, California. However, he was taken to a hospital the following day after an attack of appendicitis and was unable to participate in the finals, which were held while he was in the hospital.

== Death and posthumous honors ==
Bracey died in Buckeye, Arizona on September 23, 1940, leaving behind wife, Anna Bess Singleton Bracey and daughter, Linda Anne Bracey (Mulpagano) who was 4 months of age at the time of her father's death.

In 1970, Bracey was selected as one of the initial inductees into the Rice Athletic Hall of Fame.
