= Jason Colwick =

American pole vaulter (born 1988)

Personal information
- Born: January 25, 1988 (age 38) San Marcos, Texas, U.S.
- Height: 1.84 m (6 ft 1/2 in)
- Weight: 176 lb (80 kg)

Sport
- Country: United States
- Club: Rice University
- Now coaching: Pat Licari

Achievements and titles
- Personal best(s): Pole vault (outdoor): 5.72; Pole vault (indoor): 5.67

Jason Colwick (born January 25, 1988) is a two-time NCAA champion American pole vaulter. His personal best vault is 5.72 metres, achieved in April 2009 in Austin, Texas. He attended and competed for Rice University in Houston, Texas.

== Career ==
Colwick won the pole vault title at the 2009 NCAA Indoor Track & Field Championships. He followed this with a win at the 2009 NCAA Outdoor championships with a vault of 5.70m.

Colwick was the first Rice pole vaulter to win a title since Dave Roberts in 1973, and the school's first NCAA Outdoor champion since Ryan Harlan's 2004 decathlon win.

Colwick is the recipient of the 2008–09 Conference USA Male Athlete of the Year award.

== Personal ==
Colwick was first interested in gymnastics at an early age, which he says is the ideal sport from which to transition into pole vaulting due to gymnasts' ability to control their body in the air. He has stated that he looked to pole vaulting as something he would "enjoy more and be better at" than other sports he was participating in at the time.

Colwick adheres to a strict diet that includes fruits, vegetables, lean meats, and minimal alcohol consumption. He is also an avid and technically advanced guitar player.

In addition to his accomplishments in athletics, Colwick earned a degree in economics from Rice University and as of 2017 he works at an engineering firm in the Houston, Texas area. While at Rice, Colwick was a member of Martel College.
