= Fred Wolcott =

American hurdler

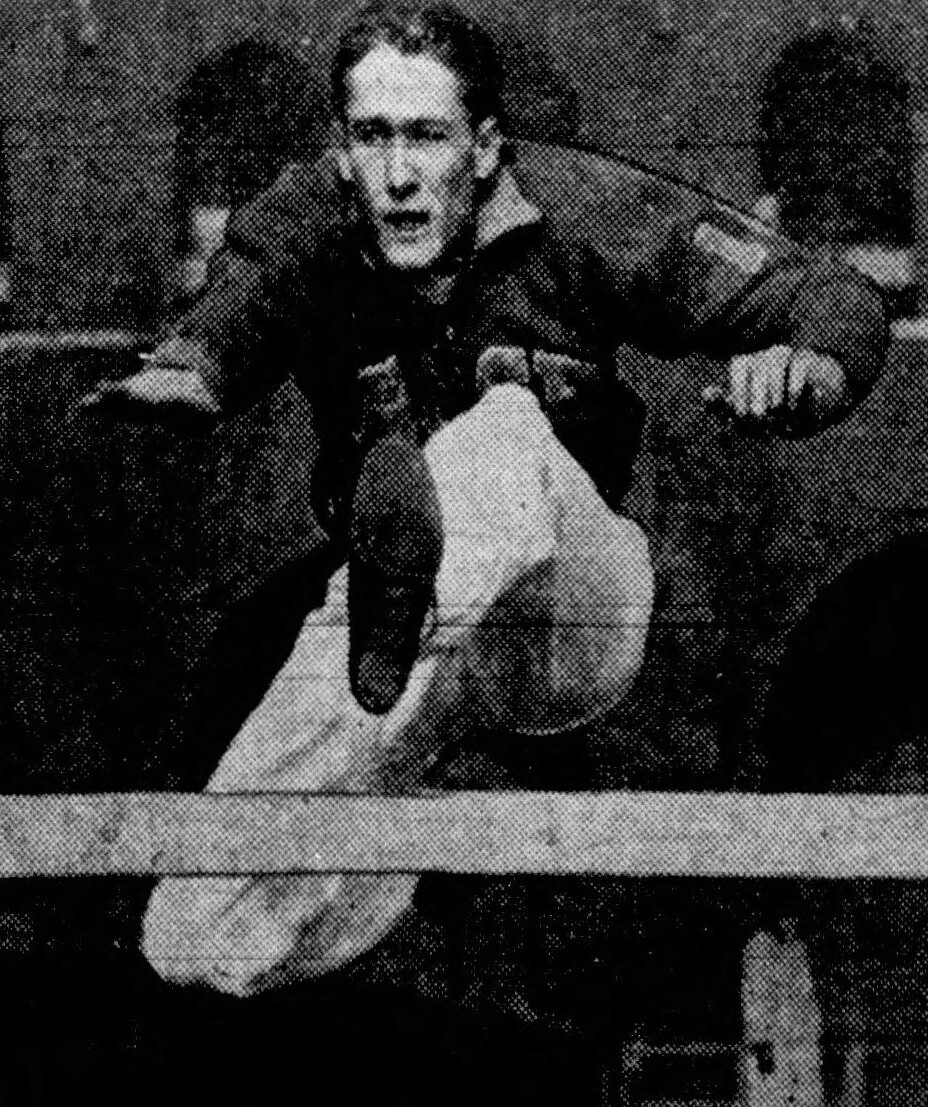
- Wolcott, circa 1942

Personal information
- Full name: Fred Arrington Wolcott
- Born: November 28, 1915 Snyder, Texas, U.S.
- Died: January 26, 1972 (aged 56)

Sport
- Sport: Running
- Events: 110 metres hurdles, 200 metres hurdles

Fred Arrington Wolcott (November 28, 1915 – January 26, 1972) was an American track and field athlete who was United States champion and world record holder in the sprint hurdles events in the late 1930s and early 1940s.

== Track career ==
After graduating from Snyder High School in Texas, Wolcott attended Rice University, where he ran for its track team, the 'Rice Owls'.

Because of the outbreak of the Second World War, Wolcott was denied Olympic glory. However, as well as running world record times (see below), he was AAU (United States national) champion seven times, NCAA (United States collegiate) champion five times, and also won, and 10 Southwest Conference (SWC) college gold medals (see below).

At the peak of his career, he was considered the United States premier hurdler.

== Championship Victories ==
Wolcott achieved the following in the AAU (United States national) championships

- champion at the 110 meters hurdles in 1938, 1940 and 1941 (he was also second in 1939 to Joe Batiste);
- champion at the 220 yards hurdles in 1938, 1939, 1940 and 1941.

Wolcott recorded the following victories at the NCAA (USA collegiate) championships

- champion at 120 yards hurdles in 1938 and 1939 (he was also second in 1940 to Ed Dugger);
- champion at 220 yards hurdles in 1938, 1939 and 1940.

== World Records ==
Wolcott achieved the following world records during his track career:

- 120 y/110 m hurdles of 13.7 s in Philadelphia on 20 June 1941;
- 200 m/220 y hurdles (straight course) of 22.3/22.5 s in Princeton on 8 June 1940.

He also ran the following world best times that were never ratified by the sport's governing body, the IAAF:

- 120 y hurdles of 13.7 in Austin, Texas on 3 May 1940;
- 200 m hurdles (with turn) of 22.9 s in Lincoln, Nebraska on 4 July 1939.

== Accolades and awards ==
In 1970, Wolcott was one of the inaugural group of inductees into the Rice Athletics Hall of Fame.

In 2005, Wolcott was inducted into the USA Track and Field Hall of Fame.

Wolcott has also been inducted into the:

- Texas Sports Hall of Fame in 1958;
- Big Country Athletic Hall of Fame;
- Snyder Athletic Hall of Fame in 2005.
