= Long jump at the NCAA Division I Outdoor Track and Field Championships =

This is a list of the NCAA Division I outdoor champions in the long jump. Measurement of the jumps was conducted in imperial distances (feet and inches) until 1975. Metrication occurred in 1976, so all subsequent championships were measured in metric distances. The women's event began in 1982.

The exact wind speeds for winning jumps were not consistently recorded until 1997. However, wind-aided designations have been applied to winning jumps with over 2.0 m/s wind since at least 1963.

== Winners ==
Key
w=wind aided
A=Altitude assisted

Women's long jump winners
Year	Athlete	Team	Distance (wind)
1982	Jennifer Inniss (GUY)	Cal State Los Angeles Golden Eagles	6.64 m (21 ft 9 1/4 in) A w
1983	Carol Lewis	Houston Cougars	6.70 m (21 ft 11 3/4 in)
1984	Gwen Loud	Hawaii Rainbow Wahine	6.85 m (22 ft 5 1/2 in) w
1985	Carol Lewis	Houston Cougars	6.73 m (22 ft 3/4 in)
1986	Cynthia Henry (JAM)	UTEP Miners	6.54 m (21 ft 5 1/4 in)
1987	Sheila Echols	LSU Lady Tigers	6.94 m (22 ft 9 in) (−1.0 m/s)
1988	Nena Gage	George Mason Patriots	6.62 m (21 ft 8 1/2 in) w
1989	Christy Opara (NGR)	BYU Cougars	6.46 m (21 ft 2 1/4 in)
1990	Sheila Hudson	California Golden Bears	6.73 m (22 ft 3/4 in)
1991	Diane Guthrie (JAM)	George Mason Patriots	6.65 m (21 ft 9 3/4 in) w
1992	Jackie Edwards (BAH)	Stanford Cardinal	6.59 m (21 ft 7 1/4 in)
1993	Daphne Saunders (BAH)	LSU Lady Tigers	6.77 m (22 ft 2 1/2 in)
1994	Dedra Davis (BAH)	Tennessee Volunteers	6.85 m (22 ft 5 1/2 in) (+2.2 m/s) w
1995	Patience Itanyi (NGR)	West Virginia Mountaineers	6.73 m (22 ft 3/4 in) (−0.4 m/s)
1996	Angee Henry	Nebraska Cornhuskers	6.69 m (21 ft 11 1/4 in) w
1997	Trecia Smith (JAM)	Pittsburgh Panthers	6.65 m (21 ft 9 3/4 in) (+0.4 m/s)
1998	Angela Brown	George Mason Patriots	6.59 m (21 ft 7 1/4 in) (+2.2 m/s) w
1999	Trecia Smith (JAM)	Pittsburgh Panthers	6.61 m (21 ft 8 in) (+1.2 m/s)
2000	Jenny Adams	Houston Cougars	6.54 m (21 ft 5 1/4 in) (+1.4 m/s)
2001	Brianna Glenn	Arizona Wildcats	6.56 m (21 ft 6 1/4 in) (+3.7 m/s) w
2002	Elva Goulbourne (JAM)	Auburn Tigers	6.82 m (22 ft 4 1/2 in) (−0.5 m/s)
2003	Elva Goulbourne (JAM)	Auburn Tigers	6.76 m (22 ft 2 in) (−0.1 m/s)
2004	Hyleas Fountain	Georgia Lady Bulldogs	6.61 m (21 ft 8 in) (+2.9 m/s) w
2005	Tianna Madison	Tennessee Volunteers	6.66 m (21 ft 10 in) (+1.1 m/s)
2006	Jovanee Jarrett (JAM)	Auburn Tigers	6.46 m (21 ft 2 1/4 in) (+2.8 m/s) w
2007	Rhonda Watkins (TTO)	UCLA Bruins	6.96 m (22 ft 10 in) (+2.5 m/s) w
2008	Brittney Reese	Ole Miss Rebels	6.94 m (22 ft 9 in) (+0.9 m/s)
2009	Kim Williams (JAM)	Florida State Seminoles	6.54 m (21 ft 5 1/4 in) (+2.2 m/s) w
2010	Blessing Okagbare (NGR)	UTEP Miners	6.79 m (22 ft 3 1/4 in) (+0.8 m/s)
2011	Tori Bowie	Southern Miss Golden Eagles	6.64 m (21 ft 9 1/4 in) (−1.8 m/s)
2012	Whitney Gipson	TCU Horned Frogs	6.82 m (22 ft 4 1/2 in) (+2.4 m/s) w
2013	Lorraine Ugen (GBR)	TCU Horned Frogs	6.77 m (22 ft 2 1/2 in) (+1.9 m/s)
2014	Jenna Prandini	Oregon Ducks	6.55 m (21 ft 5 3/4 in) (+1.2 m/s)
2015	Quanesha Burks	Alabama Crimson Tide	6.91 m (22 ft 8 in) (+2.6 m/s) w
2016	Chanice Porter (JAM)	Georgia Lady Bulldogs	6.67 m (21 ft 10 1/2 in) (−0.5 m/s)
2017	Kate Hall	Georgia Lady Bulldogs	6.73 m (22 ft 3/4 in) (−0.6 m/s)
2018	Keturah Orji	Georgia Lady Bulldogs	6.67 m (21 ft 10 1/2 in) (+1.2 m/s)
2019	Yanis David (FRA)	Florida Gators	6.84 m (22 ft 5 1/4 in) (+1.5 m/s)
2021	Tara Davis	Texas Longhorns	6.70 m (21 ft 11 3/4 in) (±0.0 m/s)
2022	Jasmine Moore	Florida Gators	6.72 m (22 ft 1/2 in) (+0.2 m/s)
2023	Ackelia Smith (JAM)	Texas Longhorns	6.88 m (22 ft 6 3/4 in) (−0.2 m/s)
2024	Ackelia Smith (JAM)	Texas Longhorns	6.79 m (22 ft 3 1/4 in) (+0.4 m/s)
2025	Synclair Savage (JAM)	Louisville Cardinals	6.72 m (22 ft 1/2 in) (+0.7 m/s)
2026	Alyssa Jones	Stanford Cardinal	7.06 m (23 ft 1 3/4 in) (+0.2 m/s)

Men's long jump winners
Year	Athlete	Team	Distance (wind)
1921	Gaylord Stinchcomb	Ohio State Buckeyes	7.11 m (23 ft 3 3/4 in)
1922	Robert LeGendre	Georgetown Hoyas	7.39 m (24 ft 2 3/4 in)
1923	DeHart Hubbard	Michigan Wolverines	7.67 m (25 ft 1 3/4 in)
1924	not held		
1925	DeHart Hubbard	Michigan Wolverines	7.90 m (25 ft 11 in)
1926	Harold Chere	Illinois College Blueboys	7.09 m (23 ft 3 in)
1927	Ed Hamm	Georgia Tech Yellow Jackets	7.34 m (24 ft 3/4 in)
1928	Ed Hamm	Georgia Tech Yellow Jackets	7.62 m 7.62 m (25 ft 0 in)
1929	Ed Gordon	Iowa Hawkeyes	7.53 m (24 ft 8 1/4 in)
1930	Ed Gordon	Iowa Hawkeyes	7.62 m (25 ft 0 in)
1931	Ed Gordon	Iowa Hawkeyes	7.60 m (24 ft 11 in)
1932	Lambert Redd	Bradley Braves	7.78 m (25 ft 6 1/4 in)
1933	John Brooks	Chicago Maroons	7.43 m (24 ft 4 1/2 in)
1934	Al Olson	USC Trojans	7.73 m (25 ft 4 1/4 in)
1935	Jesse Owens	Ohio State Buckeyes	7.96 m (26 ft 1 1/4 in)
1936	Jesse Owens	Ohio State Buckeyes	7.90 m (25 ft 11 in)
1937	Kermit King	Pittsburg State Gorillas	7.70 m (25 ft 3 in)
1938	Bill Lacefield	UCLA Bruins	7.65 m (25 ft 1 in)
1939	Judson Atchison	Texas Longhorns	7.55 m (24 ft 9 in)
1940	Jackie Robinson	UCLA Bruins	7.57 m (24 ft 10 in)
1941	Billy Brown	LSU Tigers	7.50 m (24 ft 7 1/4 in)
1942	Dallas Dupre	Ohio State Buckeyes	7.37 m (24 ft 2 in)
1943	William Christopher	Rice Owls	7.50 m (24 ft 7 1/4 in)
1944	Ralph Tyler	Ohio State Buckeyes	7.12 m (23 ft 4 1/4 in)
1945	Henry Aihara	Illinois Fighting Illini	7.66 m (25 ft 1 1/2 in)
1946	John Robertson	Texas Longhorns	7.58 m (24 ft 10 1/4 in)
1947	Willie Steele	San Diego State Aztecs	8.08 m (26 ft 6 in) A
1948	Willie Steele	San Diego State Aztecs	7.60 m (24 ft 11 in)
1949	Fred Johnson	Michigan State Spartans	7.68 m (25 ft 2 1/4 in)
1950	Jerome Biffle	Denver Pioneers	7.74 m (25 ft 4 1/2 in)
1951	George Brown	UCLA Bruins	7.46 m (24 ft 5 1/2 in)
1952	George Brown	UCLA Bruins	7.74 m (25 ft 4 1/2 in)
1953	John Bennett	Marquette Golden Eagles	7.72 m (25 ft 3 3/4 in)
1954	John Bennett	Marquette Golden Eagles	7.89 m (25 ft 10 1/2 in)
1955	Joel Shankie	Duke Blue Devils	7.40 m (24 ft 3 1/4 in)
1956	Greg Bell	Indiana Hoosiers	7.85 m (25 ft 9 in)
1957	Greg Bell	Indiana Hoosiers	8.10 m (26 ft 6 3/4 in)
1958	Ernie Shelby	Kansas Jayhawks	7.70 m (25 ft 3 in)
1959	Ernie Shelby	Kansas Jayhawks	7.75 m (25 ft 5 in)
1960	Ralph Boston	Tennessee State Tigers	7.76 m (25 ft 5 1/2 in)
1961	Don Myers	Colorado Buffaloes	7.62 m (25 ft 0 in)
1962	Anthony Watson	Oklahoma Sooners	7.94 m (26 ft 1/2 in)
1963	Clifton Mayfield	Central State Marauders	8.10 m (26 ft 6 3/4 in) A w
1964	Gayle Hopkins	Arizona Wildcats	8.16 m (26 ft 9 1/4 in)
1965	Clarence Robinson	New Mexico Lobos	7.88 m (25 ft 10 in)
1966	Rainer Stenius (FIN)	Cal State Los Angeles Golden Eagles	7.66 m (25 ft 1 1/2 in)
1967	Gary Ard	Kansas Jayhawks	7.85 m (25 ft 9 in) A
1968	Pertti Pousi (FIN)	BYU Cougars	8.01 m (26 ft 3 1/4 in)
1969	Jerry Proctor	Redlands Bulldogs	8.22 m (26 ft 11 1/2 in) w
1970	Arnie Robinson	San Diego State Aztecs	7.88 m (25 ft 10 in)
1971	James "Bouncy" Moore	Oregon Ducks	7.87 m (25 ft 9 3/4 in)
1972	Randy Williams	USC Trojans	8.13 m (26 ft 8 in) w
1973	Finn Bendixen (NOR)	UCLA Bruins	7.88 m (25 ft 10 in)
1974	Jerry Herndon	UCLA Bruins	8.08 m (26 ft 6 in)
1975	Charlton Ehizuelen (NGR)	Illinois Fighting Illini	8.20 m (26 ft 10 3/4 in) A
1976	Larry Myricks	Mississippi College Choctaws	7.96 m (26 ft 1 1/4 in)
1977	Larry Doubley	USC Trojans	8.22 m (26 ft 11 1/2 in)
1978	James Lofton	Stanford Cardinal	8.22 m (26 ft 11 1/2 in) w
1979	Larry Myricks	Mississippi College Choctaws	8.11 m (26 ft 7 1/4 in)
1980	Carl Lewis	Houston Cougars	8.35 m (27 ft 4 1/2 in) (+2.2 m/s) w
1981	Carl Lewis	Houston Cougars	8.25 m (27 ft 3/4 in)
1982	Vance Johnson	Arizona Wildcats	8.21 m (26 ft 11 in) A
1983	Ralph Spry	Ole Miss Rebels	8.36 m (27 ft 5 in) w
1984	Mike Conley	Arkansas Razorbacks	8.23 m (27 ft 0 in) w
1985	Mike Conley	Arkansas Razorbacks	8.28 m (27 ft 1 3/4 in)
1986	Eric Metcalf	Texas Longhorns	8.24 m (27 ft 1/4 in) w
1987	Paul Emordi (NGR)	Texas Southern Tigers	8.25 m (27 ft 3/4 in)
1988	Eric Metcalf	Texas Longhorns	8.28 m (27 ft 1 3/4 in) w
1989	Joe Greene	Ohio State Buckeyes	8.41 m (27 ft 7 in) A w
1990	Llewellyn Starks	LSU Tigers	8.07 m (26 ft 5 1/2 in)
1991	George Ogbeide (NGR)	Washington State Cougars	8.13 m (26 ft 8 in)
1992	Erick Walder	Arkansas Razorbacks	8.47 m (27 ft 9 1/4 in) (+1.8 m/s)
1993	Erick Walder	Arkansas Razorbacks	8.53 m (+0.9 m/s)
1994	Erick Walder	Arkansas Razorbacks	8.34 m (27 ft 4 1/4 in) (±0.0 m/s)
1995	Kareem Streete-Thompson	Rice Owls	8.28 m (27 ft 1 3/4 in) (+1.1 m/s)
1996	Richard Duncan (CAN)	Texas Longhorns	7.93 m (26 ft 0 in)
1997	Robert Howard	Arkansas Razorbacks	8.21 m (26 ft 11 in) (+1.6 m/s)
1998	Robert Howard	Arkansas Razorbacks	8.37 m (27 ft 5 1/2 in) (+2.7 m/s) w
1999	Melvin Lister	Arkansas Razorbacks	8.18 m (26 ft 10 in) (+1.3 m/s)
2000	Savanté Stringfellow	Ole Miss Rebels	8.17 m (26 ft 9 1/2 in) (+0.7 m/s)
2001	Savanté Stringfellow	Ole Miss Rebels	8.27 m (27 ft 1 1/2 in) (+0.1 m/s)
2002	Walter Davis	LSU Tigers	8.08 m (26 ft 6 in) (+1.2 m/s)
2003	Leevan Sands (BAH)	Auburn Tigers	8.05 m (26 ft 4 3/4 in) (+2.3 m/s) w
2004	John Moffitt	LSU Tigers	8.40 m (27 ft 6 1/2 in) (+2.6 m/s) w
2005	Fabrice Lapierre (AUS)	Texas A&M Aggies	8.15 m (26 ft 8 3/4 in) (+2.8 m/s) w
2006	Artûrs Âbolinš (LAT)	Nebraska Cornhuskers	8.00 m (26 ft 2 3/4 in) (+0.2 m/s)
2007	Dashalle Andrews	Cal State Northridge Matadors	7.68 m (25 ft 2 1/4 in)(−1.6 m/s)
2008	Ngonidzashe Makusha (ZIM)	Florida State Seminoles	8.30 m (27 ft 2 3/4 in) (−1.2 m/s)
2009	Ngonidzashe Makusha (ZIM)	Florida State Seminoles	8.11 m (26 ft 7 1/4 in) (+2.1 m/s) w
2010	Marquise Goodwin	Texas Longhorns	8.15 m (26 ft 8 3/4 in) (+1.0 m/s)
2011	Ngonidzashe Makusha (ZIM)	Florida State Seminoles	8.40 m (27 ft 6 1/2 in) (±0.0 m/s)
2012	Marquise Goodwin	Texas Longhorns	8.23 m (27 ft 0 in) (+0.5 m/s)
2013	Damar Forbes (JAM)	LSU Tigers	8.35 m (27 ft 4 1/2 in) (+2.9 m/s) w
2014	Marquis Dendy	Florida Gators	8.00 m (26 ft 2 3/4 in) (−0.9 m/s)
2015	Marquis Dendy	Florida Gators	8.43 m (27 ft 7 3/4 in) (+2.3 m/s) w
2016	Jarrion Lawson	Arkansas Razorbacks	8.15 m (26 ft 8 3/4 in) (+1.6 m/s)
2017	KeAndre Bates	Florida Gators	8.05 m (26 ft 4 3/4 in) (−1.1 m/s)
2018	Zack Bazile	Ohio State Buckeyes	8.37 m (27 ft 5 1/2 in) (+1.9 m/s)
2019	JuVaughn Harrison	LSU Tigers	8.20 m (26 ft 10 3/4 in) (+0.7 m/s)
2021	JuVaughn Harrison	LSU Tigers	8.27 m (27 ft 1 1/2 in) (+1.9 m/s)
2022	Wayne Pinnock (JAM)	Tennessee Volunteers	8.00 m (26 ft 2 3/4 in) (−0.5 m/s)
2023	Carey McLeod (JAM)	Arkansas Razorbacks	88.26 m (27 ft 1 in) (+1.3 m/s)
2024	JC Stevenson	USC Trojans	8.22 m (26 ft 11 1/2 in) (+0.8 m/s)
2025	Malcolm Clemons	Florida Gators	8.04 m (26 ft 4 1/2 in) (+2.2 m/s)
2026	Tafadzwa Chikomba (ZWE)	Kansas State Wildcats	8.37 m (27 ft 5 1/2 in) (−0.7 m/s)
