= Indiana Hoosiers track and field =

College track and field team

- University: Indiana University Bloomington
- Head coach: Ed Beathea
- Conference: Big Ten
- Location: Bloomington, Indiana
- Outdoor track: Robert C. Haugh Complex
- Nickname: Hoosiers
- Colors: Crimson and cream

NCAA Outdoor National Championships
- 1932

The Indiana Hoosiers track and field team is the track and field program that represents Indiana University Bloomington. The Hoosiers compete in NCAA Division I as a member of the Big Ten Conference. The team is based in Bloomington, Indiana at the Robert C. Haugh Complex.

The program is coached by Ed Beathea. The track and field program officially encompasses four teams because the NCAA considers men's and women's indoor track and field and outdoor track and field as separate sports.

The team won the 1932 NCAA Track and Field Championships. Derek Drouin is the only Hoosier athlete to have won five individual NCAA titles.

== Postseason ==
=== AIAW ===
The Hoosiers have had 7 AIAW All-Americans finishing in the top six at the AIAW indoor or outdoor championships.

AIAW All-Americans
Championships	Name	Event	Place
1980 Indoor	Marie Dwyer	600 meters	3rd
1980 Indoor	Karen Wechsler	60 meters hurdles	3rd
1980 Indoor	Annette Bohach	Shot put	6th
1981 Indoor	Barbara Ennis	600 meters	4th
1982 Indoor	Sheila Montgomery	880 yards	4th
1982 Indoor	Kim Young	4 × 440 yards relay	4th
1982 Indoor	Barbara Ennis	4 × 440 yards relay	4th
1982 Indoor	Mary Watson	4 × 440 yards relay	4th
1982 Indoor	Sheila Montgomery	4 × 440 yards relay	4th

=== NCAA ===
As of 2024, a total of 119 men and 44 women have achieved individual first-team All-American status at the Division I men's outdoor, women's outdoor, men's indoor, or women's indoor national championships (using the modern criteria of top-8 placing regardless of athlete nationality).

First team NCAA All-Americans
Team	Championships	Name	Event	Place	Ref.
Men's	1926 Outdoor	Walter Caine	800 meters	2nd	
Men's	1927 Outdoor	Harold Fields	3000 meters	6th	
Men's	1927 Outdoor	Wilmer Rinehart	Javelin throw	4th	
Men's	1928 Outdoor	Harold Fields	Mile run	6th	
Men's	1928 Outdoor	Edwin Clapham	3000 meters	5th	
Men's	1929 Outdoor	Harold Fields	3000 meters	3rd	
Men's	1929 Outdoor	Rodney Leas	3000 meters	4th	
Men's	1929 Outdoor	Edwin Clapham	3000 meters	5th	
Men's	1930 Outdoor	Jim Hatfield	220 yards hurdles	>6th	
Men's	1930 Outdoor	Jim Hatfield	110 meters hurdles	3rd	
Men's	1930 Outdoor	Henry Brocksmith	3000 meters	2nd	
Men's	1930 Outdoor	Edwin Clapham	3000 meters	3rd	
Men's	1931 Outdoor	Jim Hatfield	220 yards hurdles	5th	
Men's	1931 Outdoor	Cliff Watson	3000 meters	3rd	
Men's	1931 Outdoor	Henry Brocksmith	3000 meters	4th	
Men's	1931 Outdoor	Noble Biddinger	Hammer throw	3rd	
Men's	1932 Outdoor	Jim Hatfield	220 yards hurdles	5th	
Men's	1932 Outdoor	Ivan Fuqua	400 meters	2nd	
Men's	1932 Outdoor	Chuck Hornbostel	800 meters	1st	
Men's	1932 Outdoor	Henry Brocksmith	Mile run	2nd	
Men's	1932 Outdoor	Henry Brocksmith	3000 meters	2nd	
Men's	1932 Outdoor	Bryce Beecher	Pole vault	1st	
Men's	1932 Outdoor	Clarence Crouch	Long jump	5th	
Men's	1932 Outdoor	Clarence Crouch	Triple jump	6th	
Men's	1932 Outdoor	Noble Biddinger	Hammer throw	2nd	
Men's	1933 Outdoor	Clarence Crouch	220 yards hurdles	7	
Men's	1933 Outdoor	Ivan Fuqua	400 meters	2nd	
Men's	1933 Outdoor	Chuck Hornbostel	800 meters	1st	
Men's	1933 Outdoor	Chuck Hornbostel	Mile run	6th	
Men's	1933 Outdoor	Cliff Watson	3000 meters	2nd	
Men's	1933 Outdoor	Wes Busbee	Discus throw	5th	
Men's	1933 Outdoor	Noble Biddinger	Hammer throw	3rd	
Men's	1934 Outdoor	Ivan Fugua	400 meters	2nd	
Men's	1934 Outdoor	Chuck Hornbostel	800 meters	1st	
Men's	1934 Outdoor	Wes Busbee	Discus throw	5th	
Men's	1935 Outdoor	Don Caldemeyer	110 meters hurdles	6th	
Men's	1935 Outdoor	Robert Collier	200 meters	7th	
Men's	1936 Outdoor	Don Caldemeyer	110 meters hurdles	2nd	
Men's	1936 Outdoor	Marmaduke Hobbs	800 meters	3rd	
Men's	1936 Outdoor	Don Lash	1500 meters	3rd	
Men's	1936 Outdoor	Don Lash	5000 meters	1st	
Men's	1936 Outdoor	Tom Deckard	5000 meters	2nd	
Men's	1936 Outdoor	Jim Smith	5000 meters	4th	
Men's	1936 Outdoor	Stan Stevenson	Javelin throw	8th	
Men's	1937 Outdoor	Fred Elliott	200 meters	5th	
Men's	1937 Outdoor	Jim Smith	Mile run	2nd	
Men's	1937 Outdoor	Mell Trutt	Mile run	3rd	
Men's	1937 Outdoor	Tom Deckard	3000 meters	4th	
Men's	1938 Outdoor	Malcolm Hicks	400 meters	6th	
Men's	1938 Outdoor	Mell Trutt	Mile run	3rd	
Men's	1938 Outdoor	Jim Smith	Mile run	4th	
Men's	1939 Outdoor	Roy Cochran	220 yards hurdles	3rd	
Men's	1939 Outdoor	Archie Harris	Shot put	7th	
Men's	1939 Outdoor	Archie Harris	Discus throw	3rd	
Men's	1939 Outdoor	Roger Poorman	Javelin throw	8th	
Men's	1940 Outdoor	Campbell Kane	800 meters	1st	
Men's	1940 Outdoor	Archie Harris	Discus throw	1st	
Men's	1941 Outdoor	Roy Cochran	220 yards hurdles	2nd	
Men's	1941 Outdoor	Campbell Kane	800 meters	1st	
Men's	1941 Outdoor	Paul Kendall	Mile run	4th	
Men's	1941 Outdoor	Fred Wilt	3000 meters	1st	
Men's	1941 Outdoor	Archie Harris	Shot put	2nd	
Men's	1941 Outdoor	Archie Harris	Discus throw	1st	
Men's	1942 Outdoor	Campbell Kane	800 meters	2nd	
Men's	1942 Outdoor	Paul Kendall	800 meters	6th	
Men's	1944 Outdoor	William Walsh	3000 meters	2nd	
Men's	1946 Outdoor	Tom Mitchell	110 meters hurdles	2nd	
Men's	1946 Outdoor	Earl Mitchell	3000 meters	4th	
Men's	1947 Outdoor	Charlie Peters	100 meters	4th	
Men's	1947 Outdoor	Tom Mitchell	110 meters hurdles	4th	
Men's	1947 Outdoor	Charlie Peters	200 meters	2nd	
Men's	1948 Outdoor	Tom Mitchell	110 meters hurdles	4th	
Men's	1948 Outdoor	Charlie Peters	200 meters	4th	
Men's	1949 Outdoor	Bill Garrett	220 yards hurdles	6th	
Men's	1949 Outdoor	Charlie Peters	100 meters	6th	
Men's	1949 Outdoor	Charlie Peters	200 meters	4th	
Men's	1949 Outdoor	Frank Owens	Mile run	6th	
Men's	1950 Outdoor	Charlie Peters	100 meters	5th	
Men's	1950 Outdoor	Charlie Peters	200 meters	5th	
Men's	1950 Outdoor	Jim Roberson	Shot put	8th	
Men's	1951 Outdoor	Dave Martin	220 yards hurdles	6th	
Men's	1951 Outdoor	Cliff Anderson	Shot put	5th	
Men's	1951 Outdoor	Cliff Anderson	Discus throw	3rd	
Men's	1954 Outdoor	Lowell Zellers	Mile run	3rd	
Men's	1954 Outdoor	Jim Lambert	Mile run	6th	
Men's	1955 Outdoor	Milt Campbell	110 meters hurdles	1st	
Men's	1956 Outdoor	Greg Bell	Long jump	1st	
Men's	1956 Outdoor	Brealon Donaldson	Triple jump	6th	
Men's	1957 Outdoor	Willie May	220 yards hurdles	7th	
Men's	1957 Outdoor	Willie May	110 meters hurdles	7th	
Men's	1957 Outdoor	Greg Bell	200 meters	5th	
Men's	1957 Outdoor	Harold Caffey	400 meters	7th	
Men's	1957 Outdoor	John Miller	800 meters	7th	
Men's	1957 Outdoor	Greg Bell	Long jump	1st	
Men's	1957 Outdoor	Jerry Lane	Shot put	5th	
Men's	1958 Outdoor	Willie May	220 yards hurdles	3rd	
Men's	1958 Outdoor	Willie May	110 meters hurdles	3rd	
Men's	1959 Outdoor	Willie May	220 yards hurdles	4th	
Men's	1959 Outdoor	Willie May	110 meters hurdles	2nd	
Men's	1959 Outdoor	Reggie Shepard	High jump	4th	
Men's	1967 Outdoor	Mark Gibbens	Mile run	8th	
Men's	1968 Indoor	James Arbuckle	Shot put	5th	
Men's	1968 Outdoor	Mark Gibbens	3000 meters steeplechase	7th	
Men's	1969 Indoor	Mike Goodrich	55 meters	4th	
Men's	1969 Indoor	Gary Haupert	High jump	5th	
Men's	1969 Outdoor	Larry Highbaugh	100 meters	7th	
Men's	1969 Outdoor	Mark Gibbens	3000 meters steeplechase	8th	
Men's	1969 Outdoor	Rich Fuhs	Discus throw	8th	
Men's	1970 Indoor	Terry Musika	400 meters	3rd	
Men's	1970 Indoor	Gary Haupert	High jump	2nd	
Men's	1970 Indoor	Charles Taylor	High jump	4th	
Men's	1970 Outdoor	Mike Goodrich	200 meters	3rd	
Men's	1970 Outdoor	Mike Goodrich	4 × 100 meters relay	3rd	
Men's	1970 Outdoor	Mike Miller	4 × 100 meters relay	3rd	
Men's	1970 Outdoor	Ken Lundgren	4 × 100 meters relay	3rd	
Men's	1970 Outdoor	Larry Highbaugh	4 × 100 meters relay	3rd	
Men's	1970 Outdoor	Gary Haupert	High jump	6th	
Men's	1971 Outdoor	Mike Goodrich	200 meters	4th	
Men's	1971 Outdoor	Mike Miller	200 meters	6th	
Men's	1971 Outdoor	Bob Legge	10,000 meters	8th	
Men's	1971 Outdoor	Mike Goodrich	4 × 100 meters relay	3rd	
Men's	1971 Outdoor	Mike Miller	4 × 100 meters relay	3rd	
Men's	1971 Outdoor	Gary Powell	4 × 100 meters relay	3rd	
Men's	1971 Outdoor	Larry Highbaugh	4 × 100 meters relay	3rd	
Men's	1971 Outdoor	Gary Haupert	High jump	7th	
Men's	1972 Indoor	Doug Chokey	4 × 400 meters relay	5th	
Men's	1972 Indoor	Glen Love	4 × 400 meters relay	5th	
Men's	1972 Indoor	Winslow Taylor	4 × 400 meters relay	5th	
Men's	1972 Indoor	William Wallace	4 × 400 meters relay	5th	
Men's	1973 Indoor	Pat Mandera	3000 meters	4th	
Men's	1973 Indoor	Dennis Adama	High jump	4th	
Men's	1973 Outdoor	Pat Mandera	10,000 meters	2nd	
Men's	1974 Indoor	Pat Mandera	3000 meters	4th	
Men's	1974 Indoor	Dennis Adama	High jump	3rd	
Men's	1974 Outdoor	Craig Caudill	400 meters hurdles	4th	
Men's	1974 Outdoor	Steve Heidenreich	Mile run	6th	
Men's	1974 Outdoor	Pat Mandera	10,000 meters	4th	
Men's	1974 Outdoor	Dennis Adama	High jump	2nd	
Men's	1975 Indoor	Craig Cuadill	400 meters	3rd	
Men's	1975 Indoor	Craig Caudill	4 × 400 meters relay	2nd	
Men's	1975 Indoor	Dave Kontol	4 × 400 meters relay	2nd	
Men's	1975 Indoor	Winslow Taylor	4 × 400 meters relay	2nd	
Men's	1975 Indoor	Sreve Bielich	4 × 400 meters relay	2nd	
Men's	1975 Outdoor	Craig Caudill	400 meters hurdles	1st	
Men's	1975 Outdoor	Steve Heidenreich	Mile run	4th	
Men's	1975 Outdoor	Steve Cobb	Long jump	8th	
Men's	1977 Indoor	Tommy Hughes	600 yards	5th	
Men's	1977 Outdoor	Bob Crites	Pole vault	8th	
Men's	1978 Outdoor	Nate Lundy	4 × 400 meters relay	7th	
Men's	1978 Outdoor	Mark Shroyer	4 × 400 meters relay	7th	
Men's	1978 Outdoor	Tommy Hughes	4 × 400 meters relay	7th	
Men's	1978 Outdoor	Timi Peters	4 × 400 meters relay	7th	
Men's	1978 Outdoor	Robert Cannon	Triple jump	3rd	
Men's	1979 Indoor	Brian Kimball	Pole vault	4th	
Men's	1979 Indoor	Robert Cannon	Triple jump	1st	
Men's	1979 Outdoor	Robet Cannon	Triple jump	3rd	
Men's	1980 Indoor	Jim Spivey	800 meters	6th	
Men's	1980 Indoor	Jim Spivey	3000 meters	3rd	
Men's	1980 Indoor	Lance Fox	Pole vault	3rd	
Men's	1980 Indoor	Brian Kimball	Pole vault	3rd	
Men's	1980 Indoor	Robert Cannon	Triple jump	2nd	
Men's	1980 Outdoor	Nate Lundy	400 meters hurdles	6th	
Men's	1980 Outdoor	Jim Spivey	5000 meters	4th	
Men's	1980 Outdoor	Robert Cannon	Triple jump	6th	
Men's	1981 Indoor	Dave Volz	Pole vault	3rd	
Men's	1981 Outdoor	Sunder Nix	400 meters	8th	
Men's	1981 Outdoor	Nate Lundy	400 meters hurdles	5th	
Men's	1981 Outdoor	Jim Spivey	1500 meters	3rd	
Men's	1981 Outdoor	Dave Volz	Pole vault	1st	
Men's	1982 Indoor	Sunder Nix	400 meters	2nd	
Men's	1982 Indoor	Jim Spivey	Mile run	3rd	
Men's	1982 Indoor	Dave Volz	Pole vault	3rd	
Men's	1982 Outdoor	Jim Spivey	1500 meters	1st	
Men's	1982 Outdoor	Dave Volz	Pole vault	3rd	
Women's	1982 Outdoor	Annette Bohach	Shot put	7th	
Men's	1983 Indoor	Sunder Nix	600 yards	1st	
Men's	1983 Indoor	Jim Spivey	1000 meters	3rd	
Men's	1983 Indoor	Jim Spivey	Mile run	1st	
Men's	1983 Indoor	Dave Volz	Pole vault	6th	
Men's	1983 Outdoor	Sunder Nix	400 meters	3rd	
Men's	1983 Outdoor	Kerry Zimmermann	Decathlon	1st	
Men's	1984 Indoor	Sunder Nix	400 meters	5th	
Men's	1984 Indoor	Ron Jones	High jump	2nd	
Women's	1984 Indoor	Mary Parrott	500 meters	4th	
Women's	1984 Indoor	Vicky Davis	4 × 400 meters relay	4th	
Women's	1984 Indoor	Kim Young	4 × 400 meters relay	4th	
Women's	1984 Indoor	Shelia Montgomery	4 × 400 meters relay	4th	
Women's	1984 Indoor	Tina Parrott	4 × 400 meters relay	4th	
Men's	1984 Outdoor	Albert Robinson	100 meters	5th	
Men's	1984 Outdoor	Albert Robinson	200 meters	2nd	
Men's	1984 Outdoor	Sunder Nix	400 meters	4th	
Men's	1984 Outdoor	Jon Thomas	400 meters hurdles	3rd	
Men's	1984 Outdoor	Terry Brahm	5000 meters	7th	
Women's	1984 Outdoor	Vicky Davis	4 × 400 meters relay	4th	
Women's	1984 Outdoor	Adriane Diamond	4 × 400 meters relay	4th	
Women's	1984 Outdoor	Tina Parrott	4 × 400 meters relay	4th	
Women's	1984 Outdoor	Sheila Montgomery	4 × 400 meters relay	4th	
Women's	1984 Outdoor	Carla Battaglia	Heptathlon	7th	
Men's	1985 Indoor	Terry Brahm	1500 meters	2nd	
Men's	1985 Indoor	Larry Streeter	Triple jump	5th	
Women's	1985 Indoor	Tina Parrott	800 meters	1st	
Women's	1985 Indoor	Vicky Davis	4 × 400 meters relay	1st	
Women's	1985 Indoor	Gretchen Baker	4 × 400 meters relay	1st	
Women's	1985 Indoor	Adriane Diamond	4 × 400 meters relay	1st	
Women's	1985 Indoor	Tina Parrott	4 × 400 meters relay	1st	
Women's	1985 Indoor	Mary Moore	High jump	1st	
Men's	1985 Outdoor	Albert Robinson	200 meters	5th	
Men's	1985 Outdoor	Jon Thomas	400 meters hurdles	5th	
Men's	1985 Outdoor	Terry Brahm	1500 meters	5th	
Men's	1986 Outdoor	Albert Robinson	100 meters	8th	
Men's	1986 Outdoor	Terry Brahm	5000 meters	1st	
Women's	1986 Outdoor	Tina Parrott	800 meters	2nd	
Women's	1986 Outdoor	Vicky Davis	4 × 400 meters relay	6th	
Women's	1986 Outdoor	Karen Lewis	4 × 400 meters relay	6th	
Women's	1986 Outdoor	Tina Parrott	4 × 400 meters relay	6th	
Women's	1986 Outdoor	Adriane Diamond	4 × 400 meters relay	6th	
Men's	1987 Indoor	Mark Deady	Mile run	2nd	
Men's	1987 Indoor	Keith Allen	4 × 800 meters relay	2nd	
Men's	1987 Indoor	Deon Cameron	4 × 800 meters relay	2nd	
Men's	1987 Indoor	Mark Rodholm	4 × 800 meters relay	2nd	
Men's	1987 Indoor	Jim White	4 × 800 meters relay	2nd	
Women's	1987 Indoor	Andriane Diamond	500 meters	6th	
Women's	1987 Indoor	Colette Gourdreau	3000 meters	6th	
Men's	1987 Outdoor	Charles Marsala	1500 meters	2nd	
Women's	1987 Outdoor	Colette Goudreau	3000 meters	3rd	
Men's	1988 Indoor	Lamont Frazier	55 meters hurdles	6th	
Men's	1988 Indoor	Keith Allen	400 meters	3rd	
Men's	1988 Indoor	Keith Allen	800 meters	3rd	
Men's	1988 Indoor	Mark Deady	Mile run	8th	
Men's	1988 Indoor	Doug Beggs	4 × 800 meters relay	3rd	
Men's	1988 Indoor	Deon Cameron	4 × 800 meters relay	3rd	
Men's	1988 Indoor	Jim White	4 × 800 meters relay	3rd	
Men's	1988 Indoor	Keith Allen	4 × 800 meters relay	3rd	
Women's	1988 Indoor	Colette Gourdreau	Mile run	3rd	
Women's	1988 Indoor	Colette Gourdreau	3000 meters	3rd	
Women's	1988 Indoor	Dede Nathan	Long jump	4th	
Men's	1988 Outdoor	Charles Marsala	1500 meters	2nd	
Men's	1988 Outdoor	Mark Deady	1500 meters	3rd	
Women's	1988 Outdoor	Laura Kirkham	Heptathlon	5th	
Men's	1989 Indoor	Bob Kennedy	3000 meters	8th	
Women's	1989 Indoor	Michelle Dekkers	5000 meters	3rd	
Women's	1989 Indoor	Lashundra Nathan	Long jump	5th	
Women's	1989 Indoor	Angie Ryker	Shot put	2nd	
Women's	1989 Indoor	Katrin Koch	Shot put	3rd	
Women's	1989 Outdoor	DeDee Nathan	400 meters hurdles	6th	
Women's	1989 Outdoor	DeDee Nathan	Long jump	4th	
Women's	1989 Outdoor	Katrin Koch	Shot put	6th	
Women's	1989 Outdoor	Angie Ryker	Shot put	8th	
Men's	1990 Indoor	Glenn Terry	55 meters hurdles	3rd	
Men's	1990 Indoor	Bob Kennedy	3000 meters	3rd	
Women's	1990 Indoor	Michelle Dekkers	3000 meters	2nd	
Women's	1990 Indoor	Ann Lampkin	4 × 800 meters relay	3rd	
Women's	1990 Indoor	Kathy Gobbett	4 × 800 meters relay	3rd	
Women's	1990 Indoor	Kristen Laskowski	4 × 800 meters relay	3rd	
Women's	1990 Indoor	Jenean Sorrells	4 × 800 meters relay	3rd	
Women's	1990 Indoor	Katrin Koch	Shot put	5th	
Men's	1990 Outdoor	Bob Kennedy	1500 meters	1st	
Women's	1990 Outdoor	Jenean Sorrells	1500 meters	8th	
Women's	1990 Outdoor	Amy Legacki	10,000 meters	7th	
Women's	1990 Outdoor	DeDee Nathan	Long jump	7th	
Women's	1990 Outdoor	Katrin Koch	Shot put	3rd	
Women's	1990 Outdoor	Angie Ryker	Shot put	7th	
Women's	1990 Outdoor	Katrin Koch	Discus throw	6th	
Women's	1990 Outdoor	Angie Ryker	Discus throw	7th	
Women's	1990 Outdoor	DeDee Nathan	Heptathlon	2nd	
Men's	1991 Indoor	Bob Kennedy	Mile run	1st	
Men's	1991 Indoor	Alan Turner	Long jump	1st	
Men's	1991 Outdoor	Glenn Terry	110 meters hurdles	7th	
Men's	1991 Outdoor	Alan Turner	Long jump	2nd	
Men's	1991 Outdoor	Scott Cappos	Shot put	5th	
Women's	1991 Outdoor	Katrin Koch	Shot put	6th	
Men's	1992 Indoor	Glenn Terry	55 meters hurdles	2nd	
Men's	1992 Indoor	Bob Kennedy	3000 meters	2nd	
Women's	1992 Indoor	Amy Legacki	3000 meters	5th	
Women's	1992 Indoor	Katrin Koch	Shot put	3rd	
Men's	1992 Outdoor	Glenn Terry	110 meters hurdles	4th	
Men's	1992 Outdoor	Bob Kennedy	1500 meters	2nd	
Men's	1992 Outdoor	Mark Buse	Pole vault	5th	
Women's	1992 Outdoor	Katrin Koch	Shot put	1st	
Women's	1992 Outdoor	Katrin Koch	Discus throw	3rd	
Men's	1993 Indoor	Glenn Terry	55 meters hurdles	1st	
Men's	1993 Outdoor	Glenn Terry	110 meters hurdles	1st	
Men's	1993 Outdoor	Mark Buse	Pole vault	1st	
Men's	1993 Outdoor	Gregg Hart	Discus throw	3rd	
Women's	1993 Outdoor	Regina Frye	Long jump	5th	
Men's	1994 Indoor	Mark Buse	Pole vault	3rd	
Men's	1994 Outdoor	Mark Buse	Pole vault	3rd	
Men's	1994 Outdoor	Gregg Hart	Discus throw	2nd	
Men's	1995 Indoor	Mark Buse	Pole vault	6th	
Men's	1995 Indoor	Nathan Davis	Shot put	3rd	
Men's	1995 Outdoor	Mark Buse	Pole vault	3rd	
Men's	1996 Indoor	Nathan Davis	Shot put	5th	
Men's	1996 Indoor	Brett Sullivan	Shot put	7th	
Men's	1996 Outdoor	Nathan Davis	Shot put	4th	
Men's	1997 Indoor	Nathan Davis	Shot put	5th	
Women's	1997 Indoor	Nathalie Belfort	High jump	7th	
Women's	1997 Outdoor	Nathalie Belfort	High jump	8th	
Women's	1997 Outdoor	Mateja Bezjak	Javelin throw	8th	
Women's	1998 Outdoor	Nathalie Belfort	High jump	8th	
Men's	1999 Outdoor	Tom Chorny	3000 meters steeplechase	8th	
Men's	2000 Indoor	Greg Yeldell	Triple jump	4th	
Men's	2000 Outdoor	Greg Yeldell	Triple jump	5th	
Women's	2000 Outdoor	Rachelle Boone	4 × 100 meters relay	7th	
Women's	2000 Outdoor	Danielle Carruthers	4 × 100 meters relay	7th	
Women's	2000 Outdoor	Rose Richmond	4 × 100 meters relay	7th	
Women's	2000 Outdoor	Lorraine Dunlop	4 × 100 meters relay	7th	
Men's	2001 Indoor	Dino Efthimiou	Pole vault	5th	
Women's	2001 Indoor	Rachelle Boone	60 meters	4th	
Women's	2001 Indoor	Lorraine Dunlop	60 meters	8th	
Women's	2001 Indoor	Rachelle Boone	200 meters	2nd	
Women's	2001 Outdoor	Rachelle Boone	100 meters	6th	
Women's	2001 Outdoor	Danielle Carruthers	100 meters hurdles	2nd	
Women's	2001 Outdoor	Tia Trent	400 meters	8th	
Women's	2001 Outdoor	Rachelle Boone	4 × 100 meters relay	8th	
Women's	2001 Outdoor	Danielle Carruthers	4 × 100 meters relay	8th	
Women's	2001 Outdoor	Rose Richmond	4 × 100 meters relay	8th	
Women's	2001 Outdoor	Lorraine Dunlop	4 × 100 meters relay	8th	
Men's	2002 Indoor	Aarik Wilson	Triple jump	4th	
Women's	2002 Indoor	Rachelle Boone	60 meters	5th	
Women's	2002 Indoor	Danielle Carruthers	60 meters	6th	
Women's	2002 Indoor	Danielle Carruthers	60 meters hurdles	2nd	
Women's	2002 Indoor	Rachelle Boone	200 meters	2nd	
Men's	2002 Outdoor	Aarik Wilson	Triple jump	2nd	
Women's	2002 Outdoor	Ara Towns	4 × 100 meters relay	7th	
Women's	2002 Outdoor	Danielle Carruthers	4 × 100 meters relay	7th	
Women's	2002 Outdoor	Rose Richmond	4 × 100 meters relay	7th	
Women's	2002 Outdoor	Tia Trent	4 × 100 meters relay	7th	
Women's	2002 Outdoor	Irina Kharun	Javelin throw	4th	
Men's	2003 Indoor	John Jefferson	Mile run	2nd	
Men's	2003 Indoor	Aarik Wilson	Long jump	6th	
Men's	2003 Indoor	Aarik Wilson	Triple jump	2nd	
Women's	2003 Indoor	Rachelle Boone	60 meters	7th	
Women's	2003 Indoor	Danielle Carruthers	60 meters hurdles	2nd	
Women's	2003 Indoor	Rachelle Boone	200 meters	3rd	
Women's	2003 Indoor	Rose Richmond	Long jump	2nd	
Women's	2003 Outdoor	Rachelle Boone	100 meters	4th	
Women's	2003 Outdoor	Danielle Carruthers	100 meters hurdles	2nd	
Women's	2003 Outdoor	Rachelle Boone	200 meters	4th	
Women's	2003 Outdoor	Rose Richmond	4 × 100 meters relay	5th	
Women's	2003 Outdoor	Rachelle Boone	4 × 100 meters relay	5th	
Women's	2003 Outdoor	Ara Towns	4 × 100 meters relay	5th	
Women's	2003 Outdoor	Danielle Carruthers	4 × 100 meters relay	5th	
Women's	2003 Outdoor	Irina Kharum	Javelin throw	1st	
Men's	2004 Indoor	David Neville	200 meters	7th	
Men's	2004 Indoor	Sean Jefferson	Mile run	1st	
Men's	2004 Outdoor	David Neville	400 meters	7th	
Men's	2004 Outdoor	Aarik Wilson	Long jump	3rd	
Men's	2004 Outdoor	Aarik Wilson	Triple jump	2nd	
Men's	2005 Indoor	Sean Jefferson	Mile run	2nd	
Men's	2005 Indoor	John Jefferson	Mile run	7th	
Men's	2005 Indoor	Aarik Wilson	Long jump	1st	
Men's	2005 Indoor	Aarik Wilson	Triple jump	1st	
Men's	2005 Outdoor	Sean Jefferson	1500 meters	7th	
Men's	2005 Outdoor	Aarik Wilson	Long jump	3rd	
Men's	2005 Outdoor	Aarik Wilson	Triple jump	3rd	
Men's	2006 Indoor	David Neville	200 meters	7th	
Men's	2006 Indoor	David Neville	400 meters	2nd	
Men's	2006 Outdoor	David Neville	400 meters	3rd	
Men's	2006 Outdoor	Trey Warfield	4 × 400 meters relay	5th	
Men's	2006 Outdoor	Doug Dayhoff	4 × 400 meters relay	5th	
Men's	2006 Outdoor	Ryan Smith	4 × 400 meters relay	5th	
Men's	2006 Outdoor	David Neville	4 × 400 meters relay	5th	
Men's	2006 Outdoor	Kyle Jenkins	Triple jump	4th	
Men's	2007 Indoor	Kyle Jenkins	Triple jump	6th	
Men's	2008 Outdoor	Jeff Coover	Pole vault	7th	
Men's	2008 Outdoor	Kiwan Lawson	Long jump	8th	
Men's	2009 Indoor	DeSean Turner	Distance medley relay	7th	
Men's	2009 Indoor	John Gunnell	Distance medley relay	7th	
Men's	2009 Indoor	Evan Bardach	Distance medley relay	7th	
Men's	2009 Indoor	Ben Hubers	Distance medley relay	7th	
Men's	2009 Indoor	Derek Drouin	High jump	2nd	
Men's	2009 Indoor	Jeff Coover	Pole vault	4th	
Women's	2009 Indoor	Vera Neuenswande	Pole vault	6th	
Women's	2009 Outdoor	Sarah Pease	3000 meters steeplechase	7th	
Women's	2009 Outdoor	Vera Neuenswander	Pole vault	2nd	
Men's	2010 Indoor	Andy Bayer	3000 meters	3rd	
Men's	2010 Indoor	Andrew Poore	3000 meters	8th	
Men's	2010 Indoor	De'Sean Turner	Distance medley relay	7th	
Men's	2010 Indoor	Chris Vaughn	Distance medley relay	7th	
Men's	2010 Indoor	Daniel Stockberger	Distance medley relay	7th	
Men's	2010 Indoor	Andy Bayer	Distance medley relay	7th	
Men's	2010 Indoor	Derek Drouin	High jump	1st	
Men's	2010 Indoor	Jeff Coover	Pole vault	3rd	
Women's	2010 Indoor	Molly Ludlow	800 meters	5th	
Women's	2010 Indoor	Ashley Rhoades	High jump	7th	
Women's	2010 Indoor	Faith Sherill	Weight throw	7th	
Men's	2010 Outdoor	Derek Drouin	High jump	1st	
Men's	2010 Outdoor	Jeff Coover	Pole vault	5th	
Women's	2010 Outdoor	Molly Ludlow	800 meters	2nd	
Women's	2010 Outdoor	Sarah Pease	3000 meters steeplechase	4th	
Women's	2010 Outdoor	Faith Sherrill	Shot put	6th	
Men's	2011 Indoor	Kind Butler	200 meters	8th	
Men's	2011 Indoor	Andy Bayer	3000 meters	3rd	
Men's	2011 Indoor	Andrew Poore	3000 meters	7th	
Men's	2011 Indoor	Daniel Stockberger	Distance medley relay	2nd	
Men's	2011 Indoor	Chris Vaughn	Distance medley relay	2nd	
Men's	2011 Indoor	Joseph Holahan	Distance medley relay	2nd	
Men's	2011 Indoor	Andy Bayer	Distance medley relay	2nd	
Men's	2011 Indoor	Derek Drouin	High jump	1st	
Women's	2011 Indoor	Faith Sherrill	Shot put	4th	
Men's	2011 Outdoor	Andrew Poore	3000 meters steeplechase	3rd	
Men's	2011 Outdoor	De'Sean Turner	3000 meters steeplechase	6th	
Men's	2011 Outdoor	Tyler Sult	4 × 100 meters relay	7th	
Men's	2011 Outdoor	Kind Butler	4 × 100 meters relay	7th	
Men's	2011 Outdoor	Chris Vaughn	4 × 100 meters relay	7th	
Men's	2011 Outdoor	Devin Pipkin	4 × 100 meters relay	7th	
Women's	2011 Outdoor	Vera Neuenswander	Pole vault	4th	
Women's	2011 Outdoor	Kelsie Ahbe	Pole vault	6th	
Women's	2011 Outdoor	Faith Sherrill	Shot put	4th	
Men's	2012 Indoor	Kind Butler	200 meters	4th	
Men's	2012 Indoor	Andy Bayer	Mile run	5th	
Men's	2012 Indoor	Chris Vaughn	4 × 400 meters relay	8th	
Men's	2012 Indoor	Nick Stoner	4 × 400 meters relay	8th	
Men's	2012 Indoor	Ryan Hindes	4 × 400 meters relay	8th	
Men's	2012 Indoor	Kind Butler	4 × 400 meters relay	8th	
Men's	2012 Indoor	De'Sean Turner	Distance medley relay	2nd	
Men's	2012 Indoor	Chris Vaughn	Distance medley relay	2nd	
Men's	2012 Indoor	Daniel Stockberger	Distance medley relay	2nd	
Men's	2012 Indoor	Andy Bayer	Distance medley relay	2nd	
Men's	2012 Indoor	Darius King	High jump	2nd	
Men's	2012 Outdoor	Andy Bayer	1500 meters	1st	
Men's	2012 Outdoor	De'Sean Turner	3000 meters steeplechase	7th	
Men's	2012 Outdoor	Derek Drouin	High jump	2nd	
Men's	2013 Indoor	Andy Bayer	3000 meters	6th	
Men's	2013 Indoor	Zachary Mayhew	3000 meters	8th	
Men's	2013 Indoor	Rorey Hunter	Distance medley relay	4th	
Men's	2013 Indoor	Nathan Pierre Louis	Distance medley relay	4th	
Men's	2013 Indoor	Lance Roller	Distance medley relay	4th	
Men's	2013 Indoor	Andy Bayer	Distance medley relay	4th	
Men's	2013 Indoor	Derek Drouin	High jump	1st	
Men's	2013 Outdoor	Andy Bayer	1500 meters	8th	
Men's	2013 Outdoor	Derek Drouin	High jump	1st	
Women's	2013 Outdoor	Taja Moore	Discus throw	7th	
Men's	2014 Indoor	Derrick Morgan	Distance medley relay	3rd	
Men's	2014 Indoor	Tretez Kinnaird	Distance medley relay	3rd	
Men's	2014 Indoor	Rorey Hunter	Distance medley relay	3rd	
Men's	2014 Indoor	Robby Nierman	Distance medley relay	3rd	
Women's	2014 Outdoor	Kelsie Ahbe	Pole vault	2nd	
Women's	2014 Outdoor	Sydney Walter	Pole vault	8th	
Men's	2015 Indoor	Tre'tez Kinnaird	800 meters	8th	
Women's	2016 Outdoor	Sydney Walter	Pole vault	4th	
Women's	2016 Outdoor	Nakel McClinton	Hammer throw	7th	
Men's	2017 Indoor	Daniel Kuhn	800 meters	6th	
Men's	2017 Indoor	Joseph Murphy	Distance medley relay	5th	
Men's	2017 Indoor	Markevious Roach	Distance medley relay	5th	
Men's	2017 Indoor	Daniel Kuhn	Distance medley relay	5th	
Men's	2017 Indoor	Kyle Mau	Distance medley relay	5th	
Women's	2017 Indoor	Katherine Receveur	3000 meters	6th	
Women's	2017 Outdoor	Katherine Receveur	5000 meters	3rd	
Women's	2017 Outdoor	Sydney Walter	Pole vault	4th	
Men's	2018 Indoor	Daniel Kuhn	800 meters	4th	
Men's	2018 Indoor	Joseph Murphy	Distance medley relay	7th	
Men's	2018 Indoor	Zubin Muncherji	Distance medley relay	7th	
Men's	2018 Indoor	Teddy Browning	Distance medley relay	7th	
Men's	2018 Indoor	Kyle Mau	Distance medley relay	7th	
Women's	2018 Indoor	Brenna Calder	Distance medley relay	4th	
Women's	2018 Indoor	Natalie Price	Distance medley relay	4th	
Women's	2018 Indoor	Kelsey Harris	Distance medley relay	4th	
Women's	2018 Indoor	Katherine Receveur	Distance medley relay	4th	
Men's	2019 Indoor	Cooper Williams	800 meters	5th	
Men's	2019 Indoor	Ben Veatch	5000 meters	7th	
Men's	2019 Indoor	Daniel Michalski	Distance medley relay	4th	
Men's	2019 Indoor	Zubin Muncherji	Distance medley relay	4th	
Men's	2019 Indoor	Cooper Williams	Distance medley relay	4th	
Men's	2019 Indoor	Kyle Mau	Distance medley relay	4th	
Women's	2019 Indoor	Kelsey Harris	800 meters	7th	
Women's	2019 Indoor	Haley Harris	Distance medley relay	8th	
Women's	2019 Indoor	Natalie Price	Distance medley relay	8th	
Women's	2019 Indoor	Kelsey Harris	Distance medley relay	8th	
Women's	2019 Indoor	Katherine Receveur	Distance medley relay	8th	
Women's	2019 Indoor	Khayla Dawson	Shot put	6th	
Men's	2019 Outdoor	Cooper Williams	800 meters	5th	
Men's	2019 Outdoor	Daniel Michalski	3000 meters steeplechase	7th	
Men's	2019 Outdoor	Kyle Mau	5000 meters	8th	
Men's	2019 Outdoor	Eric Bethea	Triple jump	7th	
Women's	2019 Outdoor	Khayla Dawson	Shot put	6th	
Women's	2019 Outdoor	Madison Pollard	Shot put	8th	
Men's	2021 Indoor	Rikkoi Brathwaite	60 meters	3rd	
Men's	2021 Indoor	Ben Veatch	5000 meters	8th	
Men's	2021 Indoor	Teddy Browning	Distance medley relay	7th	
Men's	2021 Indoor	Shaton Vaughn	Distance medley relay	7th	
Men's	2021 Indoor	Cooper Williams	Distance medley relay	7th	
Men's	2021 Indoor	Arjun Jha	Distance medley relay	7th	
Women's	2021 Indoor	Madison Pollard	Shot put	7th	
Women's	2021 Outdoor	Khayla Dawson	Shot put	4th	
Men's	2022 Indoor	Rikkoi Brathwaite	60 meters	2nd	
Men's	2023 Indoor	Camden Marshall	Distance medley relay	5th	
Men's	2023 Indoor	Shaton Vaughn	Distance medley relay	5th	
Men's	2023 Indoor	Parker Raymond	Distance medley relay	5th	
Men's	2023 Indoor	Jake Gebhardt	Distance medley relay	5th	
Men's	2024 Indoor	Austin Haskett	Distance medley relay	6th	
Men's	2024 Indoor	Antonio Laidler	Distance medley relay	6th	
Men's	2024 Indoor	Parker Raymond	Distance medley relay	6th	
Men's	2024 Indoor	Camden Marshall	Distance medley relay	6th	
Women's	2024 Indoor	Kenisha Phillips	400 meters	8th	
Women's	2024 Indoor	Jessica Mercier	Pole vault	8th	

== See also ==
- Category:Indiana Hoosiers men's track and field athletes (37)
- Category:Indiana Hoosiers women's track and field athletes (9)
