= Triple jump at the NCAA Division I Outdoor Track and Field Championships =

This is a list of the NCAA Division I outdoor champions in the triple jump. The event was only held in Olympic years until 1959. Measurement of the jumps was conducted in imperial distances (feet and inches) until 1975. Metrication occurred in 1976, so all subsequent championships were measured in metric distances. The women's event was introduced in 1984.

The exact wind speeds for winning jumps were not consistently recorded until 1997. However, wind-aided designations have been applied to winning jumps with over 2.0 m/s wind since at least 1964. Best wind-legal marks were not consistently recorded until 1998.

== Winners ==
Key
w=wind aided
A=Altitude assisted

Women's triple jump winners
Year	Athlete	Team	Distance (wind) [wind-legal best]
1984	Terri Turner	Texas Longhorns	13.46 m (44 ft 1 3/4 in) w
1985	Esmeralda García (BRA)	Florida State Seminoles	13.30 m (43 ft 7 1/2 in)
1986	Terri Turner	Texas Longhorns	13.66 m (44 ft 9 3/4 in)
1987	Sheila Hudson	California Golden Bears	13.78 m (45 ft 2 1/2 in)
1988	Sheila Hudson	California Golden Bears	13.92 m (45 ft 8 in) w
1989	Renita Robinson	Nebraska Cornhuskers	13.60 m (44 ft 7 1/4 in) A w
1990	Sheila Hudson	California Golden Bears	14.04 m (46 ft 3/4 in)
1991	Donna Crumety	Saint Joseph's Hawks	13.41 m (43 ft 11 3/4 in) w
1992	Leah Kirklin	Florida Gators	13.43 m (44 ft 1/2 in)
1993	Claudia Haywood	Rice Owls	13.54 m (44 ft 5 in) w
1994	Nicole Martial (GUY)	Nebraska Cornhuskers	13.71 m (44 ft 11 3/4 in) (+1.6 m/s)
1995	Nicole Martial (GUY)	Nebraska Cornhuskers	13.74 m (45 ft 3/4 in) (+1.2 m/s)
1996	Suzette Lee (JAM)	LSU Lady Tigers	13.74 m (45 ft 3/4 in)
1997	Suzette Lee (JAM)	LSU Lady Tigers	13.92 m (45 ft 8 in) (+1.1 m/s)
1998	Trecia Smith (JAM)	Pittsburgh Panthers	13.98 m (45 ft 10 1/4 in) (−2.5 m/s)
1999	Stacey Bowers	Baylor Bears	13.97 m (45 ft 10 in) (+0.6 m/s)
2000	Keisha Spencer (JAM)	LSU Lady Tigers	13.97 m (45 ft 10 in) (+0.2 m/s)
2001	Shelly-Ann Gallimore (JAM)	Auburn Tigers	13.29 m (43 ft 7 in) (−1.4 m/s)
2002	Teresa Bundy	Florida State Seminoles	13.41 m (43 ft 11 3/4 in) (−1.7 m/s)
2003	Ineta Radêvica (LAT)	Nebraska Cornhuskers	13.93 m (45 ft 8 1/4 in) (+1.1 m/s)
2004	Ineta Radêvica (LAT)	Nebraska Cornhuskers	13.87 m (45 ft 6 in) (+3.4 m/s) w [N/A]
2005	Candice Baucham	UCLA Bruins	14.07 m (46 ft 1 3/4 in) (+0.7 m/s)
2006	Tabia Charles (CAN)	Miami Hurricanes	13.70 m (44 ft 11 1/4 in) (+1.7 m/s)
2007	Yvette Lewis	Hampton Lady Pirates	13.73 m (45 ft 1/2 in) (+0.2 m/s)
2008	Erica McLain	Stanford Cardinal	14.61 m (47 ft 11 in) (+3.4 m/s) w [13.77 m (+1.9 m/s)]
2009	Kimberly Williams (JAM)	Florida State Seminoles	14.38 m (47 ft 2 in) (+2.1 m/s) w [13.88 m (+1.3 m/s)]
2010	Patrícia Mamona (POR)	Clemson Tigers	14.01 m (45 ft 11 1/2 in) (+1.3 m/s)
2011	Patrícia Mamona (POR)	Clemson Tigers	14.05 m (46 ft 1 in) (+1.7 m/s)
2012	Ganna Demydova (UKR)	Southern Miss Golden Eagles	14.20 m (46 ft 7 in) (+2.0 m/s)
2013	Shanieka Ricketts (JAM)	San Diego State Aztecs	14.14 m (46 ft 4 1/2 in) (+1.9 m/s)
2014	Shanieka Ricketts (JAM)	San Diego State Aztecs	14.00 m (45 ft 11 in) (+1.9 m/s)
2015	Keturah Orji	Georgia Lady Bulldogs	14.15 m (46 ft 5 in) (+1.8 m/s)
2016	Keturah Orji	Georgia Lady Bulldogs	14.53 m (47 ft 8 in) (+1.2 m/s)
2017	Keturah Orji	Georgia Lady Bulldogs	14.29 m (46 ft 10 1/2 in) (+3.3 m/s) w [14.01 m (+1.7 m/s)]
2018	Keturah Orji	Georgia Lady Bulldogs	14.04 m (46 ft 3/4 in) (+1.1 m/s)
2019	Shardia Lawrence (JAM)	Kansas State Wildcats	13.99 m (45 ft 10 3/4 in) (+0.2 m/s)
2021	Ruth Usoro (NGR)	Texas Tech Lady Raiders	14.19 m (46 ft 6 1/2 in) (−0.7 m/s)
2022	Jasmine Moore	Florida Gators	14.32 m (46 ft 11 3/4 in) (+0.2 m/s)
2023	Jasmine Moore	Florida Gators	14.78 m (48 ft 5 3/4 in) (+1.3 m/s)
2024	Ackelia Smith (JAM)	Texas Longhorns	14.52 m (47 ft 7 1/2 in) (+0.9 m/s)
2025	Winny Bii (KEN)	Texas A&M Aggies	13.96 m (45 ft 9 1/2 in) (±0.0 m/s)
2026	Shantae Foreman (JAM)	Clemson Tigers	14.24 m (46 ft 8 1/2 in) (+1.2 m/s)

Men's triple jump winners
Year	Athlete	Team	Distance (wind) [wind-legal best]
1932	Lambert Redd	Bradley Braves	14.71 m (48 ft 3 in)
1933	not held		
1934	not held		
1935	not held		
1936	Herschel Neil	Northwest Missouri State Bearcats	14.77 m (48 ft 5 1/4 in)
1937	not held		
1938	not held		
1939	not held		
1940	not held		
1941	not held		
1942	not held		
1943	not held		
1944	not held		
1945	not held		
1946	not held		
1947	not held		
1948	Lloyd Lamois	Minnesota Golden Gophers	13.97 m (45 ft 10 in)
1949	not held		
1950	not held		
1951	not held		
1952	George Shaw	Columbia Lions	14.68 m (48 ft 1 3/4 in)
1953	not held		
1954	not held		
1955	not held		
1956	Bill Sharpe	West Chester Golden Rams	15.36 m (50 ft 4 1/2 in)
1957	not held		
1958	not held		
1959	Jack Smythe	Houston Cougars	15.12 m (49 ft 7 1/4 in)
1960	Luther Hayes	USC Trojans	15.53 m (50 ft 11 1/4 in)
1961	Luther Hayes	USC Trojans	15.60 m (51 ft 2 in)
1962	Kermit Alexander	UCLA Bruins	15.52 m (50 ft 11 in)
1963	Norm Tate	North Carolina Central Eagles	15.55 m (51 ft 0 in) A
1964	Charles Craig	Fresno State Bulldogs	15.77 m (51 ft 8 3/4 in) w
1965	Clarence Robinson	New Mexico Lobos	15.29 m (50 ft 1 3/4 in)
1966	Craig Fergus	San Jose State Spartans	15.62 m (51 ft 2 3/4 in)
1967	Art Baxter	New Mexico Lobos	15.96 m (52 ft 4 1/4 in) A
1968	Lennox Burgher (JAM)	Nebraska Cornhuskers	16.18 m (53 ft 1 in)
1969	Pertti Pousi (FIN)	BYU Cougars	15.89 m (52 ft 1 1/2 in)
1970	Mohinder Singh Gill (IND)	Cal Poly Mustangs	15.78 m (51 ft 9 1/4 in)
1971	Mohinder Singh Gill (IND)	Cal Poly Mustangs	16.67 m (54 ft 8 1/4 in) w
1972	James Butts	UCLA Bruins	16.21 m (53 ft 2 in) w
1973	Milan Tiff	UCLA Bruins	16.53 m (54 ft 2 3/4 in)
1974	Charlton Ehizuelen (NGR)	Illinois Fighting Illini	16.66 m (54 ft 7 3/4 in)
1975	Ron Livers	San Jose State Spartans	16.81 m (55 ft 1 3/4 in) A w
1976	Phil Robins (BAH)	Southern Illinois Salukis	16.67 m (54 ft 8 1/4 in) w
1977	Ron Livers	San Jose State Spartans	16.86 m (55 ft 3 3/4 in)
1978	Ron Livers	San Jose State Spartans	17.15 m (56 ft 3 in)
1979	Nate Cooper	Villanova Wildcats	17.10 m (56 ft 1 in)
1980	Steve Hanna (BAH)	UTEP Miners	16.79 m (55 ft 1 in)
1981	Steve Hanna (BAH)	UTEP Miners	17.04 m (55 ft 10 3/4 in)
1982	Keith Connor (GBR)	SMU Mustangs	17.57 m (57 ft 7 1/2 in) (±0.0 m/s) A
1983	Keith Connor (GBR)	SMU Mustangs	17.26 m (56 ft 7 1/2 in)
1984	Mike Conley	Arkansas Razorbacks	17.37 m (56 ft 11 3/4 in)
1985	Mike Conley	Arkansas Razorbacks	17.72 m (58 ft 1 1/2 in) (+3.2 m/s) w [17.54 m]
1986	Kenny Harrison	Kansas State Wildcats	17.07 m (56 ft 0 in)
1987	Frank Rutherford (BAH)	Houston Cougars	17.09 m (56 ft 3/4 in)
1988	Edrick Floreal (CAN)	Arkansas Razorbacks	17.19 m (56 ft 4 3/4 in) w
1989	Edrick Floreal (CAN)	Arkansas Razorbacks	17.29 m (56 ft 8 1/2 in) A
1990	Edrick Floreal (CAN)	Arkansas Razorbacks	17.23 m (56 ft 6 1/4 in)
1991	Brian Wellman (BER)	Arkansas Razorbacks	17.33 m (56 ft 10 1/4 in) w
1992	Brian Wellman (BER)	Arkansas Razorbacks	17.30 m (56 ft 9 in) w
1993	Tyrell Taitt	NC State Wolfpack	16.91 m (55 ft 5 1/2 in) w
1994	Erick Walder	Arkansas Razorbacks	16.91 m (55 ft 5 1/2 in) (+0.7 m/s)
1995	Ndabazinhle Mdhlongwa (ZIM)	Louisiana Ragin' Cajuns	16.88 m (55 ft 4 1/2 in) (+1.4 m/s)
1996	Robert Howard	Arkansas Razorbacks	17.11 m (56 ft 1 1/2 in) w
1997	Robert Howard	Arkansas Razorbacks	16.93 m (55 ft 6 1/2 in) (+1.0 m/s)
1998	Robert Howard	Arkansas Razorbacks	16.97 m (55 ft 8 in) (+0.6 m/s)
1999	LeVar Anderson	LSU Tigers	17.12 m (56 ft 2 in) (+3.7 m/s) w [16.29 m (+1.6 m/s)]
2000	Melvin Lister	Arkansas Razorbacks	16.96 m (55 ft 7 1/2 in) (+0.4 m/s)
2001	Walter Davis	LSU Tigers	16.56 m (54 ft 3 3/4 in) (+3.6 m/s) w [16.33 m (+0.8 m/s)]
2002	Walter Davis	LSU Tigers	17.34 m (56 ft 10 1/2 in) (−0.3 m/s)
2003	Julien Kapek (FRA)	USC Trojans	17.12 m (56 ft 2 in) (+1.7 m/s)
2004	Leevan Sands (BAH)	Auburn Tigers	17.12 m (56 ft 2 in) (+2.6 m/s) w [16.97 m (+1.7 m/s)]
2005	Rodrigo Mendes (BRA)	BYU Cougars	17.04 m (55 ft 10 3/4 in) (+2.2 m/s) w [16.90 m (+0.7 m/s)]
2006	Rafeeq Curry	Florida State Seminoles	16.70 m (54 ft 9 1/4 in) (+1.0 m/s)
2007	Rayon Taylor (JAM)	Cornell Big Red	16.37 m (53 ft 8 1/4 in) (+2.4 m/s) w [16.09 m (+0.9 m/s)]
2008	Muhammad Halim (ISV)	Cornell Big Red	16.67 m (54 ft 8 1/4 in)(+4.0 m/s) w [N/A]
2009	Will Claye	Oklahoma Sooners	17.24 m (56 ft 6 1/2 in) (+2.5 m/s) w [17.19 m (+2.0 m/s)]
2010	Christian Taylor	Florida Gators	17.09 m (56 ft 3/4 in) (+2.9 m/s) w [17.02 m (+0.9 m/s)]
2011	Christian Taylor	Florida Gators	17.80 m (58 ft 4 3/4 in) (+2.3 m/s) w [17.40 m (+2.0 m/s)]
2012	Omar Craddock	Florida Gators	16.92 m (55 ft 6 in) (+2.9 m/s) w [16.27 m (+1.6 m/s)]
2013	Omar Craddock	Florida Gators	16.92 m (55 ft 6 in) (+1.9 m/s)
2014	Marquis Dendy	Florida Gators	17.05 m (55 ft 11 1/4 in) (+3.1 m/s) w [N/A]
2015	Marquis Dendy	Florida Gators	17.71 m (58 ft 1 in) (+2.4 m/s) [17.50 m (+1.2 m/s)]
2016	Latario Collie (BAH)	Texas A&M Aggies	16.97 m (55 ft 8 in) (+1.4 m/s)
2017	KeAndre Bates	Florida Gators	16.76 m (54 ft 11 3/4 in) (+2.4 m/s) [16.75 m (+1.3 m/s)]
2018	Tahar Triki (ALG)	Texas A&M Aggies	16.79 m (55 ft 1 in) (−0.7 m/s)
2019	Du Mapaya (ZIM)	TCU Horned Frogs	17.13 m (56 ft 2 1/4 in) (+1.1 m/s)
2021	Emmanuel Ihemeje (ITA)	Oregon Ducks	17.14 m (56 ft 2 3/4 in) (+1.8 m/s)
2022	Du Mapaya (ZIM)	TCU Horned Frogs	17.26 m (56 ft 7 1/2 in) (+0.5 m/s)
2023	Jaydon Hibbert (JAM)	Arkansas Razorbacks	17.56 m (57 ft 7 1/4 in) (−0.3 m/s)
2024	Salif Mane	Fairleigh Dickinson Knights	17.14 m (56 ft 2 3/4 in) (+1.7 m/s)
2025	Brandon Green	Oklahoma Sooners	16.81 m (55 ft 1 3/4 in) (+0.3 m/s)
2026	Selva Prabhu (IND)	Kansas State Wildcats	16.92 m (55 ft 6 in) (+1.3 m/s)
