= Triple jump at the NCAA Division I Indoor Track and Field Championships =

The triple jump has been held at the NCAA Division I Indoor Track and Field Championships annually since 1968, three years after the start of the championships. The women's competition began in 1985, two years after the start of the NCAA Division I Women's Indoor Track and Field Championships.

== Winners ==
Key
A=Altitude assisted

Women's triple jump winners
Year	Athlete	Team	Mark
1985	Esmeralda Garcia	Florida State Seminoles	13.51 m
1986	Wendy Brown	USC Trojans	13.49 m
1987	Yvette Bates	USC Trojans	13.79 m
1988	Yvette Bates	USC Trojans	13.64 m
1989	Flora Hyacinth	Alabama Crimson Tide	13.44 m
1990	Sheila Hudson	California Golden Bears	13.94 m
1991	Leah Kirklin	Florida Gators	13.24 m
1992	Leah Kirklin	Florida Gators	13.40 m
1993	Telisa Young	Texas Longhorns	13.19 m
1994	Telisa Young	Texas Longhorns	13.20 m
1995	Najuma Fletcher	Pittsburgh Panthers	13.48 m
1996	Nicola Martial	Nebraska Cornhuskers	13.62 m
1997	Suzette Lee	LSU Lady Tigers	14.25 m
1998	Trecia Smith	Pittsburgh Panthers	14.05 m
1999	Nicole Gamble	North Carolina Tar Heels	14.05 m
2000	Keisha Spencer	LSU Lady Tigers	14.06 m
2001	Virginia Miller	Arkansas Razorbacks	13.51 m
2002	Nicole Toney	LSU Lady Tigers	13.72 m
2003	Elva Goulbourne	Auburn Tigers	13.78 m
2004	Ineta Radevica	Nebraska Cornhuskers	13.68 m
2005	Gisele Oliveira	Clemson Tigers	13.76 m
2006	Yvette Lewis	Hampton Pirates	13.75 m
2007	Erica McLain	Stanford Cardinal	13.91 m
2008	Erica McLain	Stanford Cardinal	14.20 m
2009	Kimberly Williams	Florida State Seminoles	13.81 m
2010	Kimberly Williams	Florida State Seminoles	13.95 m
2011	Kimberly Williams	Florida State Seminoles	13.96 m
2012	Andrea Geubelle	Kansas Jayhawks	13.67 m
2013	Andrea Geubelle	Kansas Jayhawks	14.18 m
2014	Shanieka Ricketts	San Diego State Aztecs	13.97 m
2015	Ciarra Brewer	Florida Gators	14.01 m
2016	Keturah Orji	Georgia Bulldogs	14.12 m
2017	Keturah Orji	Georgia Bulldogs	14.11 m
2018	Keturah Orji	Georgia Bulldogs	14.27 m
2019	Yanis David	Florida Gators	14.03 m
2021	Ruth Usoro	Texas Tech Red Raiders	14.27 m
2022	Jasmine Moore	Florida Gators	14.57 m
2023	Jasmine Moore	Florida Gators	15.12 m
2024	Ruta Lasmane	Texas Tech Red Raiders	14.47 m
2025	Agur Dwol	Oklahoma Sooners	13.72 m
2026	(France) Daniela Wamokpego	Kansas State Wildcats	13.84 m

Men's triple jump winners
Year	Athlete	Team	Mark
1968	Bob Beamon	UTEP Miners	15.94 m
1969	Lennox Burgher	Nebraska Cornhuskers	15.86 m
1970	Milan Tiff	Miami RedHawks	15.84 m
1971	Mohinder Gill	Cal Poly Mustangs	16.10 m
1972	Barry McClure	Middle Tennessee Blue Raiders	16.11 m
1973	Barry McClure	Middle Tennessee Blue Raiders	16.50 m
1974	Tommy Haynes	Middle Tennessee Blue Raiders	16.63 m
1975	Arnold Grimes	UTEP Miners	16.87 m
1976	Arnold Grimes	UTEP Miners	16.29 m
1977	Ian Campbell	Washington State Cougars	16.54 m
1978	Ian Campbell	Washington State Cougars	16.97 m
1979	Robert Cannon	Indiana Hoosiers	16.67 m
1980	Sanya Owalabi	Kansas Jayhawks	16.55 m
1981	Keith Connor	SMU Mustangs	17.31 m
1982	Keith Connor	SMU Mustangs	16.83 m
1983	Mike Conley	Arkansas Razorbacks	17.23 m
1984	Mike Conley	Arkansas Razorbacks	16.97 m
1985	Mike Conley	Arkansas Razorbacks	17.06 m
1986	Frank Rutherford	Houston Cougars	16.99 m
1987	Frank Rutherford	Houston Cougars	17.09 m
1988	Kenny Harrison	Kansas State Wildcats	16.74 m
1989	Edrick Floréal	Arkansas Razorbacks	17.14 m
1990	Edrick Floréal	Arkansas Razorbacks	16.73 m
1991	Eugene Greene	Boise State Broncos	16.24 m
1992	Erick Walder	Arkansas Razorbacks	16.88 m
1993	Erick Walder	Arkansas Razorbacks	16.86 m
1994	Erick Walder	Arkansas Razorbacks	17.24 m
1995	Hrvoje Verzi	Georgia Bulldogs	16.60 m
1996	Robert Howard	Arkansas Razorbacks	16.73 m
1997	Robert Howard	Arkansas Razorbacks	17.04 m
1998	Robert Howard	Arkansas Razorbacks	16.49 m
1999	Melvin Lister	Arkansas Razorbacks	16.78 m
2000	Melvin Lister	Arkansas Razorbacks	16.65 m
2001	Walter Davis	LSU Tigers	16.89 m
2002	Walter Davis	LSU Tigers	17.23 m
2003	Allen Simms	USC Trojans	17.26 m
2004	LeJuan Simon	LSU Tigers	17.05 m
2005	Aarik Wilson	Indiana Hoosiers	16.92 m
2006	Jaanus Uudmae	Arkansas Razorbacks	16.57 m
2007	Andre Black	Louisville Cardinals	16.29 m
2008	Nkosinza Balumbu	Arkansas Razorbacks	16.54 m
2009	Christian Taylor	Florida Gators	16.98 m
2010	Christian Taylor	Florida Gators	17.18 m
2011	Will Claye	Florida Gators	17.32 m
2012	Omar Craddock	Florida Gators	16.75 m
2013	Bryce Lamb	Texas Tech Red Raiders	16.96 m
2014	Felix Obi	Baylor Bears	16.59 m
2015	Marquis Dendy	Florida Gators	17.37 m
2016	Clive Pullen	Arkansas Razorbacks	16.64 m
2017	Clive Pullen	Arkansas Razorbacks	16.86 m
2018	O'Brien Wasome	Texas Longhorns	16.82 m
2019	Jordan Scott	Virginia Cavaliers	16.89 m
2021	Emmanuel Ihemeje	Oregon Ducks	17.26 m
2022	Emmanuel Ihemeje	Oregon Ducks	16.83 m
2023	Jaydon Hibbert	Arkansas Razorbacks	17.54 m
2024	Russell Robinson	Miami Hurricanes	16.76 m
2025	(France) Jonathan Sermes	Missouri Tigers	17.04 m
2026	(France) Jonathan Sermes	Texas Tech Red Raiders	17.25 m
