= Boise State Broncos track and field =

American college track and field team

- University: Boise State University
- Head coach: Pat McCurry
- Conference: Pac-12
- Location: Boise, Idaho
- Outdoor track: Ed Jacoby Track
- Nickname: Broncos
- Colors: Blue and orange

The Boise State Broncos track and field team is the track and field program that represents Boise State University. The Broncos compete in NCAA Division I as a member of the Pac-12 Conference. The team is based in Boise, Idaho, at the Ed Jacoby Track.

The program is coached by Pat McCurry. The track and field program officially encompasses four teams because the NCAA considers men's and women's indoor track and field and outdoor track and field as separate sports.

In 2019, runner Allie Ostrander became the first Boise State athlete to win three NCAA individual titles, which she accomplished in the 3000 meters steeplechase. The performance marked the most national titles won by any Broncos athlete in any sport.

== Postseason ==
As of August 2025, a total of 26 men and 16 women have achieved individual first-team All-American status for the team at the Division I men's outdoor, women's outdoor, men's indoor, or women's indoor national championships (using the modern criteria of top-8 placing regardless of athlete nationality).

First team NCAA All-Americans
Team	Championships	Name	Event	Place	Ref.
Men's	1983 Indoor	Jack Jacoby	High jump	4th	
Men's	1984 Indoor	Jack Jacoby	High jump	3rd	
Men's	1984 Outdoor	Jack Jacoby	High jump	1st	
Men's	1985 Outdoor	Jack Jacoby	High jump	6th	
Men's	1987 Indoor	Troy Kemp	High jump	3rd	
Men's	1987 Indoor	Wendell Lawrence	Triple jump	6th	
Men's	1987 Outdoor	Troy Kemp	High jump	3rd	
Men's	1987 Outdoor	Steve Muse	Shot put	6th	
Men's	1987 Outdoor	Steve Muse	Discus throw	2nd	
Women's	1987 Outdoor	Carmel Major	Heptathlon	8th	
Men's	1988 Indoor	Troy Kemp	High jump	2nd	
Men's	1988 Indoor	Wendell Lawrence	Triple jump	4th	
Men's	1988 Indoor	Steve Muse	Shot put	5th	
Men's	1988 Outdoor	Troy Kemp	High jump	3rd	
Men's	1988 Outdoor	Wendell Lawrence	Triple jump	3rd	
Women's	1988 Outdoor	Crystal Young	Heptathlon	2nd	
Men's	1989 Outdoor	Cliff Dillard	High jump	5th	
Women's	1989 Outdoor	Crystal Young	Heptathlon	5th	
Men's	1990 Indoor	Eugene Greene	Triple jump	6th	
Men's	1990 Outdoor	Eugene Greene	Triple jump	5th	
Men's	1991 Indoor	Eugene Greene	Triple jump	1st	
Men's	1996 Outdoor	Jose Uribe	10,000 meters	4th	
Men's	1997 Outdoor	Cormac Smith	5000 meters	7th	
Men's	1997 Outdoor	Jarred Rome	Discus throw	2nd	
Women's	1997 Outdoor	Abigail Ferguson	Triple jump	8th	
Women's	1997 Outdoor	Casey Fletcher	Javelin throw	6th	
Men's	1999 Outdoor	Corey Nelson	200 meters	4th	
Men's	1999 Outdoor	Corey Nelson	400 meters	7th	
Men's	1999 Outdoor	Travis Armstrong	3000 meters steeplechase	7th	
Women's	1999 Outdoor	Leslie Price	High jump	6th	
Men's	2000 Outdoor	Jarred Rome	Shot put	5th	
Men's	2000 Outdoor	Mark Hoxmeier	Shot put	8th	
Men's	2000 Outdoor	Jarred Rome	Discus throw	7th	
Men's	2000 Outdoor	Mark Hoxmeier	Discus throw	8th	
Women's	2000 Outdoor	Abby Peters	10,000 meters	7th	
Men's	2002 Outdoor	Mark Hoxmeier	Discus throw	5th	
Men's	2002 Outdoor	Justin St. Clair	Javelin throw	8th	
Men's	2003 Outdoor	Kendrick Johnson	Triple jump	7th	
Men's	2003 Outdoor	Rob Minnitti	Javelin throw	2nd	
Women's	2003 Outdoor	Trina Rogers	Javelin throw	6th	
Men's	2004 Outdoor	Kendrick Johnson	Triple jump	6th	
Men's	2004 Outdoor	Gabriel Wallin	Javelin throw	1st	
Men's	2004 Outdoor	Keron Francis	Javelin throw	4th	
Women's	2004 Outdoor	Miruna Mataoanu	High jump	5th	
Men's	2005 Outdoor	Mattias Jons	Hammer throw	2nd	
Men's	2005 Outdoor	Gabriel Wallin	Javelin throw	1st	
Men's	2006 Indoor	Mattias Jons	Weight throw	6th	
Men's	2006 Outdoor	Mattias Jons	Hammer throw	2nd	
Men's	2006 Outdoor	Keron Francis	Javelin throw	3rd	
Men's	2007 Outdoor	Forest Braden	5000 meters	7th	
Men's	2008 Indoor	Ryan Grinnell	High jump	8th	
Men's	2008 Indoor	Ryan Grinnell	Triple jump	6th	
Men's	2008 Indoor	Simon Wardhaugh	Weight throw	5th	
Men's	2008 Outdoor	Ryan Grinnell	Triple jump	6th	
Men's	2009 Indoor	Ryan Grinnell	Triple jump	4th	
Men's	2009 Indoor	Simon Wardhaugh	Weight throw	5th	
Women's	2009 Indoor	Eleni Kafourou	Long jump	1st	
Women's	2009 Indoor	Eleni Kafourou	Triple jump	7th	
Men's	2009 Outdoor	Simon Wardhaugh	Hammer throw	3rd	
Men's	2009 Outdoor	Pontus Thomee	Javelin throw	5th	
Men's	2010 Indoor	Zacharias Arnos	Triple jump	8th	
Men's	2010 Outdoor	Pontus Thomee	Javelin throw	2nd	
Women's	2012 Indoor	Mele Vaisima	Weight throw	6th	
Men's	2012 Outdoor	Kurt Felix	Decathlon	1st	
Women's	2013 Outdoor	Emma Bates	5000 meters	7th	
Women's	2013 Outdoor	Emma Bates	10,000 meters	3rd	
Women's	2014 Indoor	Emma Bates	3000 meters	4th	
Women's	2014 Indoor	Emma Bates	5000 meters	4th	
Women's	2014 Outdoor	Marisa Howard	3000 meters steeplechase	2nd	
Women's	2014 Outdoor	Emma Bates	5000 meters	4th	
Women's	2014 Outdoor	Emma Bates	10,000 meters	1st	
Men's	2015 Outdoor	Jordin Andrade	400 meters hurdles	2nd	
Men's	2015 Outdoor	David Elliott	1500 meters	8th	
Women's	2015 Outdoor	Marisa Howard	3000 meters steeplechase	4th	
Men's	2016 Indoor	David Elliott	Mile run	5th	
Women's	2016 Outdoor	Brenna Peloquin	5000 meters	8th	
Women's	2016 Outdoor	Brenna Peloquin	10,000 meters	8th	
Women's	2017 Outdoor	Allie Ostrander	3000 meters steeplechase	1st	
Women's	2017 Outdoor	Allie Ostrander	5000 meters	4th	
Women's	2018 Indoor	Allie Ostrander	3000 meters	2nd	
Women's	2018 Indoor	Alexis Fuller	Distance medley relay	5th	
Women's	2018 Indoor	Chelsea Walker	Distance medley relay	5th	
Women's	2018 Indoor	Amy Pfaff	Distance medley relay	5th	
Women's	2018 Indoor	Allie Ostrander	Distance medley relay	5th	
Women's	2018 Outdoor	Allie Ostrander	3000 meters steeplechase	1st	
Women's	2018 Outdoor	Allie Ostrander	5000 meters	8th	
Women's	2019 Indoor	Allie Ostrander	3000 meters	4th	
Women's	2019 Indoor	Allie Ostrander	5000 meters	8th	
Women's	2019 Outdoor	Kristie Schoffield	800 meters	6th	
Women's	2019 Outdoor	Allie Ostrander	3000 meters steeplechase	1st	
Women's	2021 Outdoor	Clare O'Brien	5000 meters	8th	
Women's	2021 Outdoor	Clare O'Brien	10,000 meters	6th	
Women's	2022 Outdoor	Kristie Schoffield	800 meters	1st	

== See also ==
- Category:Boise State Broncos men's track and field athletes (12)
- Category:Boise State Broncos women's track and field athletes (4)
