= 2006 USA Outdoor Track and Field Championships =

- Dates: June 22–25
- Host city: Indianapolis, Indiana
- Venue: IU Michael A. Carroll Track & Soccer Stadium
- Level: Senior
- Type: Outdoor
- Events: 40 (men: 20; women: 20)

The 2006 USA Outdoor Track and Field Championships was organised by USA Track & Field and held from June 22 to 25 at the IU Michael A. Carroll Track & Soccer Stadium in Indianapolis, Indiana. The four-day competition served as the national championships in track and field for the United States. As there was no Summer Olympics or World Championships in Athletics held that year, the competition did not serve as a national team selection event.

It was the fourth time that the stadium in Indianapolis had held the combined gender national track and field event, having last done so for the 1997 edition. The USA Junior Championships were held in conjunction with the event, starting one day earlier, and were used for selection for the 2006 World Junior Championships in Athletics. Performances at that section included an American junior record of 71.62 m (234 ft 11 1/2 in) for the men's hammer throw by Walter Henning.

Bad weather including heavy storms caused a rearrangement of the programme, with many events scheduled on the first day being postponed. The weather also affected the calibre of performances at the meeting.

Then world record holder Justin Gatlin was among the major names to feature at the competition, but his 100 m win in 9.93 seconds was later removed from the record books due to his failing a doping test in April earlier that year.

Bernard Lagat, newly eligible to compete after gaining citizenship in 2005, completed a 1500 m/5000 m double. This was the first time that a man had ever achieved that feat at the American national championships, with Alexander Grant's 1903 double in the mile run and two miles being the closest equivalent.

Breaux Greer had a seventh straight win in the men's javelin throw, making him the most successful javelin athlete in the history of the championships. Daniel Lincoln extended his national streak in the steeplechase to three wins, while A.G. Kruger broke James Parker's hammer throw streak of the same length. Jennifer Stuczynski brought an end to Stacy Dragila's dominance of the women's pole vault – in which Dragila had won seventh straight national titles. Kim Kreiner had a third successive victory in the women's javelin, setting a new American record in the process.

== Results ==
=== Men track events ===
Event	Gold		Silver		Bronze	
100 metres^{[nb1]}	Tyson Gay	10.07	Shawn Crawford	10.26	Jordan Vaden	10.27
200 metres	Wallace Spearmon	19.90	Jordan Vaden	19.98	Rodney Martin	20.14
400 metres	Andrew Rock	44.45	LaShawn Merritt	44.50	David Neville	44.75
800 metres	Khadevis Robinson	1:44.13	Nick Symmonds	1:45.83	Jebreh Harris	1:45.91
1500 metres	Bernard Lagat	3:39.29	Gabriel Jennings	3:39.42	Leonel Manzano	3:39.49
5000 metres	Bernard Lagat	13:14.32	Matt Tegenkamp	13:15.00	Dathan Ritzenhein	13:16.61
10,000 metres	Jorge Torres	28:14.43	Meb Keflezighi	28:18.74	Dan Browne	28:19.32
110 m hurdles	Dominique Arnold	13.10	Terrence Trammell	13.14	Ryan Wilson	13.22
400 m hurdles	Kerron Clement	47.39	Bershawn Jackson	47.48	James Carter	48.44
3000 m s'chase	Daniel Lincoln	8:22.78	Steve Slattery	8:25.54	Daniel Huling	8:27.41
20 km walk	Kevin Eastler	1:25:09.67	John Nunn	1:27:16.83	Tim Seaman	1:29:56.84

=== Men field events ===
Event	Gold		Silver		Bronze	
High jump	Tora Harris	2.33 m (7 ft 7 1/2 in)	Keith Moffatt	2.30 m (7 ft 6 1/2 in)	Andra Manson	2.24 m (7 ft 4 in)
Pole vault	Russ Buller	5.80 m (19 ft 1/4 in)	Toby Stevenson	5.80 m (19 ft 1/4 in)	Tommy Skipper Jeff Hartwig Brad Walker	5.60 m (18 ft 4 1/4 in)
Long jump	Brian Johnson	8.10 m (26 ft 6 3/4 in)	Dwight Phillips	8.08 m (26 ft 6 in)	Miguel Pate	7.96 m (26 ft 1 1/4 in)
Triple jump	Walter Davis	17.71 m (58 ft 1 in)	Kenta Bell	17.19 m (56 ft 4 3/4 in)	Aarik Wilson	16.91 m (55 ft 5 1/2 in)
Shot put	Adam Nelson	22.04 m (72 ft 3 1/2 in)	Reese Hoffa	21.96 m (72 ft 1/2 in)	Christian Cantwell	21.89 m (71 ft 9 3/4 in)
Discus throw	Ian Waltz	64.52 m (211 ft 8 in)	Casey Malone	62.23 m (204 ft 2 in)	Jarred Rome	60.93 m (199 ft 10 3/4 in)
Hammer throw	A. G. Kruger	75.81 m (248 ft 8 1/2 in)	James Parker	72.33 m (237 ft 3 1/2 in)	Jake Freeman	71.87 m (235 ft 9 1/2 in)
Javelin throw	Breaux Greer	85.40 m (280 ft 2 in)	Rob Minnitti	77.99 m (255 ft 10 1/4 in)	Brian Chaput	76.44 m (250 ft 9 1/4 in)
Decathlon	Tom Pappas	8319 pts	Ryan Harlan	7872 pts	Jake Arnold	7827 pts

- ^{nb1} The original winner, Justin Gatlin in 9.93 seconds, was later disqualified due to doping.

=== Women track events ===
Event	Gold		Silver		Bronze	
100 metres	Marion Jones	11.10	Lauryn Williams	11.17	Torri Edwards	11.17
200 metres	Rachelle Boone-Smith	22.31	Shalonda Solomon	22.47	LaTasha Jenkins	22.66
400 metres	Sanya Richards	49.27	DeeDee Trotter	50.40	Monique Henderson	50.71
800 metres	Hazel Clark	1:59.94	Alice Schmidt	2:00.00	Frances Santin	2:01.15
1500 metres	Treniere Clement	4:10.44	Lindsey Gallo	4:10.72	Sarah Schwald	4:11.60
5000 metres	Lauren Fleshman	15:12.37	Kara Goucher	15:14.13	Blake Russell	15:19.07
10,000 metres	Amy Rudolph	32:25.56	Sara Slattery	32:29.97	Samia Akbar	32:41.84
100 m hurdles	Virginia Powell	12.63	Damu Cherry	12.64	Michelle Perry	12.67
400 m hurdles	Lashinda Demus	53.07	Sheena Johnson	53.90	Shauna Smith	54.76
3000 m s'chase	Lisa Galaviz	9:57.58	Kristin Anderson	9:57.98	Delilah DiCrescenzo	10:03.31
20,000 m walk	Joanne Dow	1:35:20.76	Teresa Vaill	1:39:24.07	Samantha Cohen	1:40:29.46

=== Women field events ===
Event	Gold		Silver		Bronze	
High jump	Chaunté Howard	2.01 m (6 ft 7 in)	Amy Acuff	1.92 m (6 ft 3 1/2 in)	Destinee Hooker	1.86 m (6 ft 1 in)
Pole vault	Jennifer Stuczynski	4.55 m (14 ft 11 in)	Jillian Schwartz	4.50 m (14 ft 9 in)	Becky Holliday	4.45 m (14 ft 7 in)
Long jump	Rose Richmond	6.93 m (22 ft 8 3/4 in)w	Tianna Madison	6.77 m (22 ft 2 1/2 in)w	Grace Upshaw	6.65 m (21 ft 9 3/4 in)
Triple jump	Shani Marks	13.89 m (45 ft 6 3/4 in)	Tiombe Hurd	13.86 m (45 ft 5 1/2 in)	Yvette Lewis	13.42 m (44 ft 1/4 in)
Shot put	Jillian Camarena	18.92 m (62 ft 3/4 in)	Laura Gerraughty	18.24 m (59 ft 10 in)	Elizabeth Wanless	18.11 m (59 ft 4 3/4 in)
Discus throw	Aretha Thurmond	62.50 m (205 ft 1/2 in)	Suzy Powell	58.68 m (192 ft 6 in)	Becky Breisch	57.97 m (190 ft 2 1/4 in)
Hammer throw	Jessica Cosby	70.78 m (232 ft 2 1/2 in)	Erin Gilreath	69.39 m (227 ft 7 3/4 in)	Amber Campbell	67.52 m (221 ft 6 1/4 in)
Javelin throw	Kim Kreiner	62.43 m (204 ft 9 3/4 in)	Dana Pounds	56.00 m (183 ft 8 1/2 in)	Kayla Wilkinson	52.30 m (171 ft 7 in)
Heptathlon	GiGi Johnson	6183 pts	Hyleas Fountain	6148 pts	Fiona Asigbee	6030 pts
