= Albert Robinson (sprinter) =

American sprinter (born 1964)

Personal information
- Born: November 28, 1964 (age 61) Chicago, Illinois, U.S.

Sport
- Sport: Sprinting
- Event: 4 × 100 metres relay

Albert Robinson (born November 28, 1964) is an American sprinter. He competed in the men's 4 × 100 metres relay at the 1988 Summer Olympics.

Robinson was an All-American sprinter for the Indiana Hoosiers track and field team, finishing runner-up in the 200 m at the 1984 NCAA Division I Outdoor Track and Field Championships.
