= Stiletto (2008 film) =

- DVD cover art
- Directed by: Nick Vallelonga
- Written by: Paul Sloan
- Produced by: Nick Vallelonga; Warren Ostergard
- Starring: Tom Berenger; Michael Biehn; Stana Katic; William Forsythe; D. B. Sweeney; Diane Venora; James Russo; Tom Sizemore
- Cinematography: Jeffrey C. Mygatt
- Edited by: Greg Babor; Richard Halsey; Tony Wise
- Music by: Cliff Martinez
- Distributed by: First Look International
- Release dates: April 29, 2008 (Newport Beach); March 3, 2009 (United States)
- Running time: 99 minutes
- Country: United States
- Language: English

Stiletto is a 2008 American direct-to-video action film directed by Nick Vallelonga and produced by Nick Vallelonga and Warren Ostergard. It stars Tom Berenger, Michael Biehn, Stana Katic, William Forsythe, and Tom Sizemore. It premiered at Newport Beach International Film Festival on April 28, 2008, and was released on DVD March 3, 2009 by First Look Studios.

== Plot ==
Two crime lords, Virgil Vadalos, a wealthy Greek mafia boss and an MS-13 leader meet in a bathhouse to discuss business. A woman appears in the room with a stiletto switchblade knife, and kills the MS-13 leader, before stabbing Virgil, leaving him for dead. Virgil survives, however, and orders his men and a corrupt Los Angeles Police Department detective to find the woman, whom he identifies as his lover, Raina. Virgil is puzzled by Raina's seemingly random attacks and seeks an explanation for her actions. Making things worse for Virgil is the disappearance of $2 million in cash. Virgil's two top henchmen—the intense Lee and scheming Alex—dislike each other and suspect the other of being involved with the disappearance. The corrupt detective's partner, Hanover, is killed when Raina was about to be assaulted by white supremacists. Hanover was shot through her face.

Raina, meanwhile, is seeking out men who wronged her in the past. She hunts down, seduces and kills several men from several different gangs, throwing the underworld further into mayhem. As she kills one after another, she is headed straight for her original target: Virgil.

== Cast ==
- Stana Katic as Raina
- Tom Berenger as Virgil Vadalos
- Michael Biehn as Lee
- Paul Sloan as Beck
- William Forsythe as Alex
- Diane Venora as Sylvia Vadalos
- Kelly Hu as Detective Hanover
- Amanda Brooks as Penny
- James Russo as Engelhart
- Tom Sizemore as "Large" Bills
- Dominique Swain as Nancy
- Tony Lip as Gus
- D. B. Sweeney as Danny
- David Proval as Mohammad
- Robert R. Shafer as Krieger
- R. A. Mihailoff as "Big Arms", Nazi Biker
- Andrew Bryniarski as Nazi Biker

== Music ==
- Cliff Martinez
- "Broken" – Performed by Jacqueline Lord

Written by Jacqueline Lord
Produced by Michael Lord
Mixed by Tom Lord Alge

- "Bang Bang" – Performed by ER Inc

Written by Edgard Jaude, Rafael Torres, Kevin Davis and Garrett Wesley

- "Fallen Angel" – Written and performed by Chris Vaughn
- The song "Lipimena Ta Tragoudia" was featured by Viktor Mastoridis
