= Sarah Schwald =

American middle-distance runner

Sarah Schwald (born January 2, 1973, in Bellingham, Washington) is an American middle-distance runner.

== Collegiate career ==
After winning the 1500 meters at the 1989 USA Junior Championships, Schwald enrolled at the University of Arkansas where she ran both cross county and track.

During her four years at Arkansas, Schwald won the 3000 meters at the 1995 NCAA Indoor Championships and won three Southeastern Conference titles—the indoor 3000 meter run and the outdoor 1500 and 3000 meter runs, all in 1995. She was selected SEC Female Indoor Track Athlete of the Year after the 1995 season.

== Professional career ==
In 1996, Schwald finished seventh at the US Olympic Trials in the 1500 meters. After taking some alternating years off and running, Schwald got back into her stride in 2001 where she finished third at the USA Indoors and third at the USA Outdoor Nationals. She ended the season ranked second in the US by Track and Field News.

2002 was another strong year as Schwald finished third at USA Indoors mile, third at USA Outdoors and fourth at the 2002 IAAF World Cup 3000 meters. The following year, she finished second in the 1500 m at USA Indoors.

In 2004, Schwald came in third at USA Indoors in the 3000 m. Her 2005 saw her finish fourth in 1500 m at USA Outdoors and rank third in the US from Track and Field News.

Schwald again came in third in the 1500 meters at the 2006 USA Outdoors. She also placed fifth in the 4 km short race at the 2006 USA Cross Country Championships.
