= Rose Richmond =

American long jumper

Personal information
- Born: January 29, 1981 (age 45) St. Petersburg, Florida, United States

Sport
- Sport: Track and field

Rose Marie Richmond (born January 29, 1981 in St. Petersburg, Florida) is an American long jumper. Her personal best jump is 6.84 metres, achieved in June 2006 in Indianapolis.

She finished third at the 2006 World Athletics Final and sixth at the 2006 IAAF World Cup.

Richmond was an All-American jumper for the Indiana Hoosiers track and field team, finishing runner-up in the long jump at the 2003 NCAA Division I Indoor Track and Field Championships and running on their 4 × 100 m relay team.
