= Robert Cannon (triple jumper) =

American triple jumper

Personal information
- Nationality: American
- Born: July 9, 1958 (age 67) Long Beach, California, United States
- Height: 185 cm (6 ft 1 in)
- Weight: 76 kg (168 lb)

Sport
- Sport: Athletics
- Event: Triple jump
- College team: Indiana Hoosiers
- Club: Southern California Cheetahs

Robert Willis Cannon (born July 9, 1958) is an American athlete. He competed in the men's triple jump at the 1988 Summer Olympics.

Competing for the Indiana Hoosiers track and field team, Cannon won the 1979 triple jump at the NCAA Division I Indoor Track and Field Championships. Cannon finished second behind fellow American Willie Banks in the triple jump event at the British 1985 AAA Championships.

On May 9, 1995 at age 36, Cannon triple jumped 15.96 winning the Dan Aldrich Masters Meet.
