= Mark Deady =

American middle-distance runner

Personal information
- Nationality: American
- Born: October 2, 1967 (age 59) Lincolnshire, Illinois, U.S.
- Height: 188 cm (6 ft 2 in)
- Weight: 71 kg (157 lb)

Sport
- Country: USA
- Sport: Middle-distance running

Mark Deady (born October 2, 1967) is an American Olympic middle-distance runner. He represented his country in the men's 1500 meters at the 1988 Summer Olympics. His time was a 3:41.91 in the first heat, and a 3:39.47 in the semifinals.

In 1985, Mark Deady was State Champion for Stevenson High School, Lincolnshire, Illinois. He was the Boys Class AA winner in the 1600 meter run. His time of 4:07.45 was a new State Record and stood until 2009 when Jeff Thode of J.B. Conant's High School ran to a winning time of 4:04.

Deady was an All-American runner for the Indiana Hoosiers track and field team, finishing runner-up in the mile at the 1987 NCAA Division I indoor track and field championships.
