= Archie Harris (discus thrower) =

American discus thrower and football player (1918–1965)

Archie Haggie Harris Jr. (July 3, 1918 – October 29, 1965) was an American world-record-setting discus thrower and football player.

Raised in Ocean City, New Jersey, Harris graduated in 1937 from Ocean City High School.

As an Indiana University student-athlete, Harris won the 1940 NCAA Track and Field Championships, defending his title 1941 with the world record of 53.26 m. In 1941 he also became US champion. At, Indiana, Harris also played football, lettering on the Indiana Hoosiers football team in 1938, and 1939, and 1940. He was a second-team selection on the 1940 All-Big Ten Conference football team as an end.

During World War II Harris joined the United States Army Air Forces, reaching the rank of second lieutenant and serving as a bomber pilot in the 332d Fighter Group, known as the Tuskegee Airmen. An African American, he was unable to find a job as a commercial pilot after the war. He became physical education teacher at the YMCA in Harlem.

In 2001 he was inducted into the Indiana University Athletics Hall of Fame.

Harris died on October 29, 1965, at Veterans Administration Hospital in New York City.
