= Chris Vaughn =

American filmmaker, songwriter, and producer

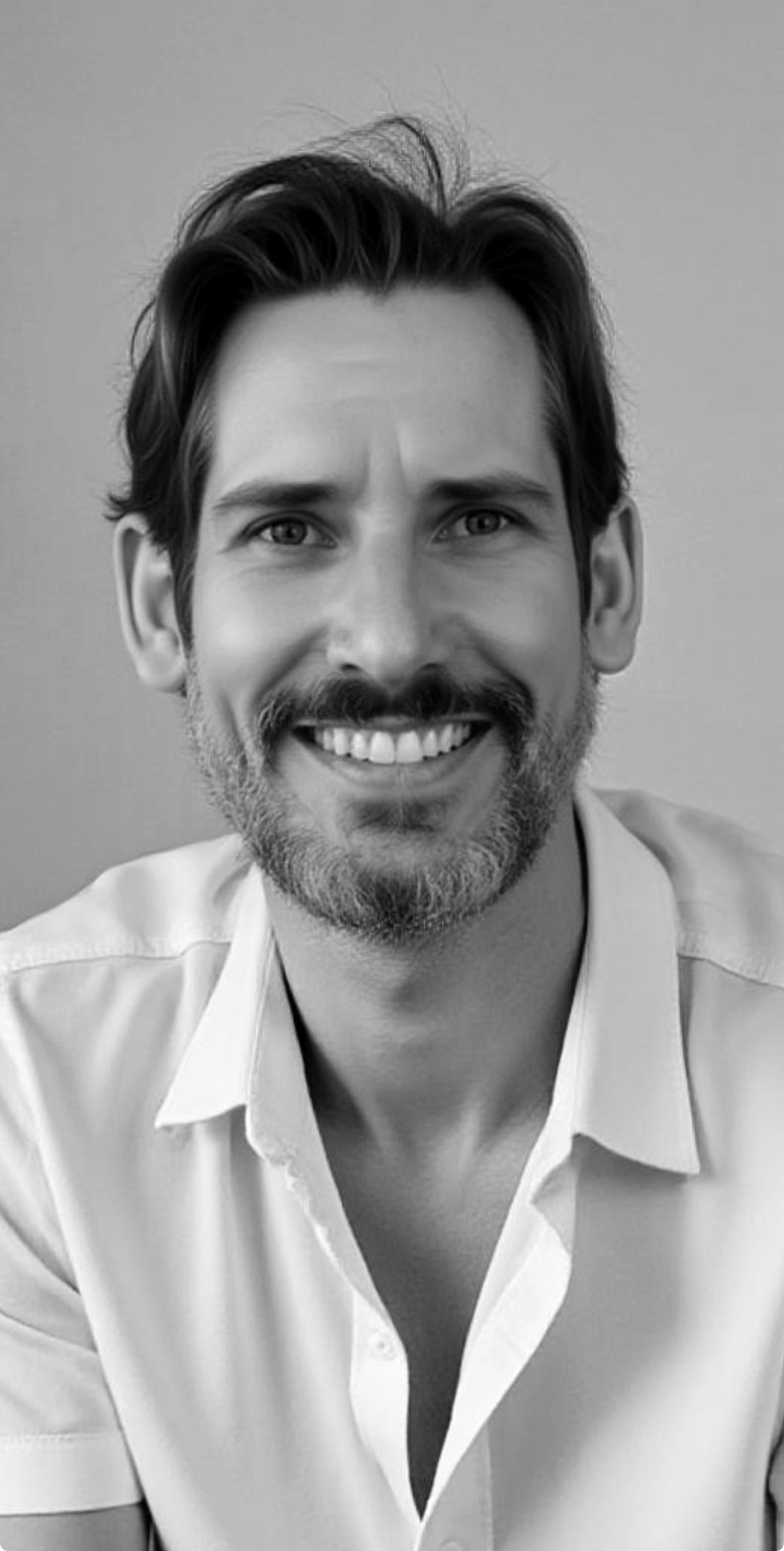
- Chris Vaughn, American filmmaker and songwriter
- Born: July 30, 1976 (age 50); Neptune Township, New Jersey, U.S.
- Occupations: Singer/songwriter; filmmaker
- Years active: 2008–present
- Website: messertrust.org

Chris Vaughn (born Christopher Vaughn Messer; July 30, 1976) is an American filmmaker, songwriter, and producer. He wrote, produced and directed the short film The Fifth Chair (2022) and the documentary Jerseyboy Hero, which features appearances by Bruce Springsteen and Nick Vallelonga.

== Career ==
Vaughn graduated from Shore Regional High School. Vaughn began his career in film production in the mid-2000s, working on the crime thriller Stiletto (2008), directed by Nick Vallelonga and starring Tom Berenger, Michael Biehn and Diane Venora. The project marked Vaughn’s first major credit within a theatrically released motion picture. In 2011, Vaughn directed and produced Jerseyboy Hero, a documentary centered on themes of local identity and perseverance. The film premiered at Clearview Cinemas in Red Bank, New Jersey, and was promoted in conjunction with a community benefit for the FoodBank of Monmouth and Ocean Counties. The documentary was later made available on Amazon Prime Video and Tubi.

In 2022, Vaughn released The Fifth Chair, a short film addressing themes of regret and spiritual reflection. It received official selection status at the Garden State Film Festival and was recognized for Excellence in Direction and Message-Driven Narrative. Reception was mixed; IndieWrap Magazine cited its “scary soundtrack and surprising climax,” while Take 2 Indie Review noted it as “a missed opportunity” despite commendable ambition. Vaughn also founded New Toy Music, a BMI-affiliated label through which he has released original songs that blend Americana and contemporary Christian influences. Several of his tracks appear in the soundtracks for Stiletto and Jerseyboy Hero.

== Music ==
Vaughn’s debut album, released in 2009, included the track Speak, which later became the theme for Jerseyboy Hero. The CD launch event was held in Asbury Park and supported local hunger relief efforts. In 2025, Speak was remastered and reissued, along with an acoustic version of his single Relate, distributed on major streaming platforms. He has also made many appearances at live music venues along the Jersey Shore, including The Saint in Asbury Park and Bar Anticipation in Lake Como, where he performed alongside Nick Clemons, son of the late Clarence Clemons of the E Street Band.

== Personal life ==
Vaughn lives in Monmouth County, New Jersey. As of 2008, he lived in Brick Township with his wife Shannon and their two young sons. He continues to develop independent film and music projects that focus on themes of family, redemption, and legacy.

== Filmography ==
- Stiletto (2008) – Production contributor
- Jerseyboy Hero (2011) – Director, Producer
- The Fifth Chair (2022) – Writer, Director, Producer

== Discography (selected) ==
- Speak (2009, 2025 Remastered)
- Relate (Acoustic Version) (2025)
