= Nicola Martial =

Guyanese triple jumper

Personal information
- Nationality: Guyanese
- Born: 13 May 1974 (age 52)

Sport
- Sport: Athletics
- Event: Triple jump

Nicola Martial (born 13 May 1974) is a Guyanese athlete. She competed in the women's triple jump at the 1996 Summer Olympics.

Competing for the Nebraska Cornhuskers track and field team, Martial won the 1994 and 1995 triple jump at the NCAA Division I Outdoor Track and Field Championships. In 2016, she was inducted into the Nebraska Cornhuskers hall of fame.
