= Andrew Bayer (runner) =

American runner (born 1990)

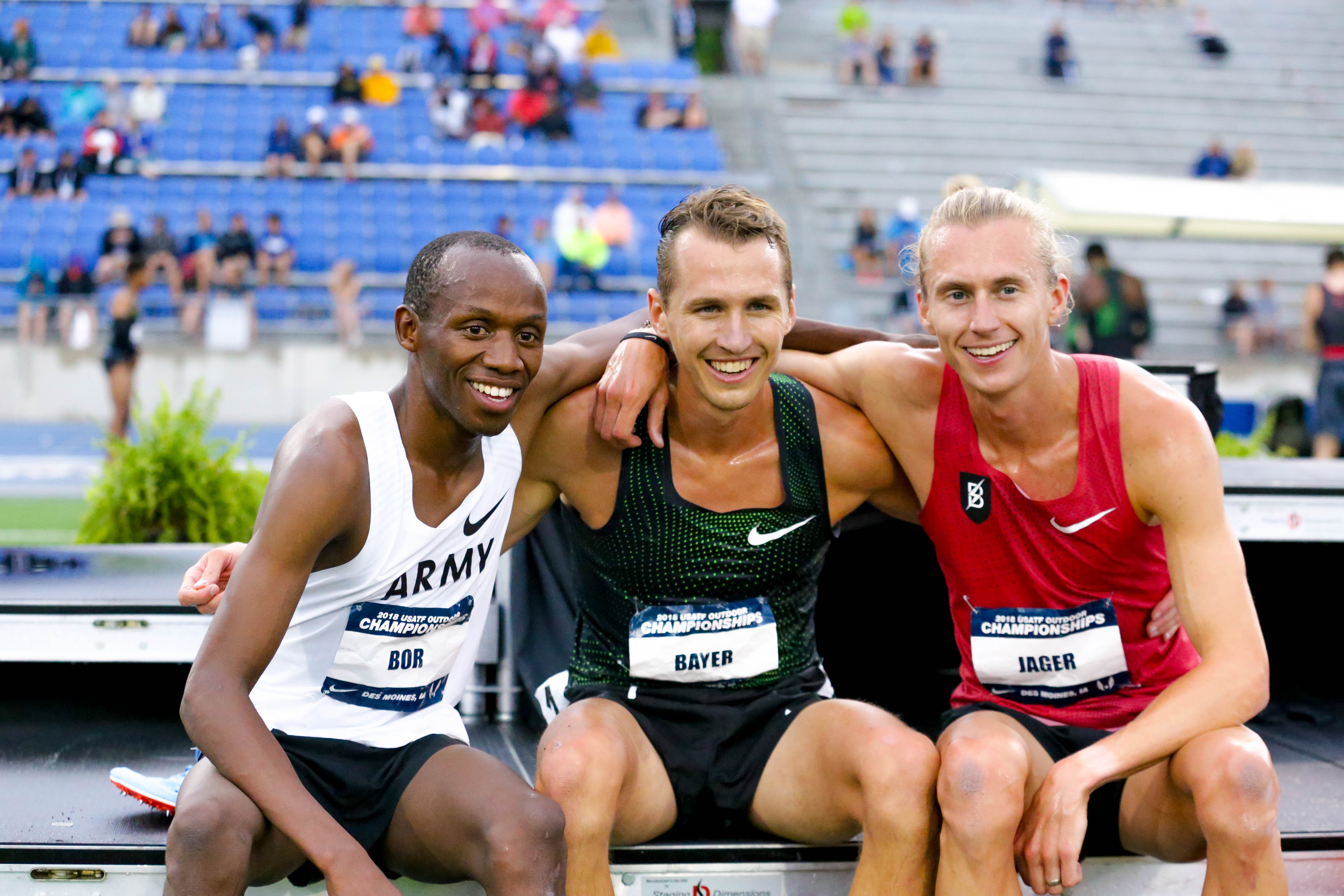
- Bayer (centre) in 2018

Personal information
- Nationality: American
- Born: February 3, 1990 (age 36)

Sport
- Sport: Athletics
- Events: 1500 metres; 3000 metres steeplechase
Medal record
Men's athletics
NACAC Championships
Gold medal – first place	2015 San José	3000 m steeplechase
Gold medal – first place	2018 Toronto	3000 m steeplechase

Andrew Bayer (born February 3, 1990) is an American track and field athlete who specializes in 1500 metres and 3000 metres steeplechase. Representing the United States at the 2019 World Athletics Championships, he qualified for the final in men's 3000 metres steeplechase.

== High school ==
Bayer attended Leo high school just outside of Fort Wayne, Indiana. He set school records in the 1600m (4:12) and 3200m (9:02) before winning the 3200m at the IHSAA State meet in 2008. He also earned two varsity letters in wrestling.

== College ==
After high school, Bayer studied and competed for Indiana University. He ended his time at Indiana as a six time Big Ten Champion, 11 time All-American, and the 2012 NCAA 1500m Champion after out-kicking Miles Batty of BYU and Ryan Hill of NC State to win by 0.01 seconds.

== Professional career ==
In September 2013, he signed a contract with Nike and started training with the Bowerman Track Club in Oregon under coach Jerry Schumacher. He also started competing in the Diamond League that same year. He finished 4th place at the US olympic trials, missing the national team by one place in both 2012 and 2016. In 2016, Bayer moved to Bloomington, Indiana to be coached by his former college coach, Ron Helmer, who coached him until his retirement. Nike ended his contract at the end of 2019. He announced his retirement from the sport in the spring of 2021.

In November 2022, via an Instagram post, Bayer announced he was coming out of retirement and would start training again with goals of the competing at the 2023 World Championships or the 2024 Olympics. Bayer finished 9th in the 2023 US Steeplechase final. A few weeks later, he signed a contract with On.

== Personal life ==
Bayer goes by the name "Andy". He is married and has a son and a daughter.

== Results and personal records ==
=== NCAA Championship results ===
Year	Meet	Venue	Event	Place	Time
2010	NCAA Indoor Championships	Randal Tyson Track Center	3000m	3rd	8:11.19
2010	NCAA Indoor Championships	Randal Tyson Track Center	DMR	7th	9:39.35
2011	NCAA Indoor Championships	Gilliam Indoor Track Stadium	DMR	2nd	9:29.65
2011	NCAA Indoor Championships	Gilliam Indoor Track Stadium	3000m	3rd	8:04.70
2012	NCAA Indoor Championships	Ford Idaho Center	3000m	15th	8:16.95
2012	NCAA Indoor Championships	Ford Idaho Center	Mile	5th	4:02.13
2012	NCAA Indoor Championships	Ford Idaho Center	DMR	2nd	9:35.67
2012	NCAA Outdoor Championships	Drake Stadium	1500m	1st	3:43.82
2013	NCAA Indoor Championships	Randal Tyson Track Center	3000m	7th	7:51.51
2013	NCAA Indoor Championships	Randal Tyson Track Center	DMR	4th	9:34.30
2013	NCAA Outdoor Championship	Hayward Field	1500m	8th	3:51.39

=== Championship results ===
Year	Meet	Venue	Event	Place	Time
2012	US Track and Field Championships	Hayward Field	1500m	4th	3:37.24
2012	NACAC U23 Championships	Centro Paralímpico Nacional	5000m	1st	15:13.01
2013	US Track and Field Championships	Drake Stadium	1500m	H3 4th	3:41.77
2014	US Track and Field Championships	Hornet Stadium	Steeplechase	7th	8:40.53
2015	US Indoor Track and Field Championships	Reggie Lewis Track and Athletic Center	Mile	7th	4:04.35
2015	US Track and Field Championships	Hayward Field	Steeplechase	4th	8:21.44
2015	NACAC Championships	Estadio Nacional de Costa Rica	Steeplechase	1st	8:44.88
2016	US Indoor Track and Field Championships	Oregon Convention Center	3000m	10th	8:01.28
2016	US Track and Field Championships	Hayward Field	Steeplechase	4th	8:28.59
2017	US Track and Field Championships	Hornet Stadium	Steeplechase	4th	8:18.90
2018	US Track and Field Championships	Drake Stadium	Steeplechase	3rd	8:24.66
2018	NACAC Championships	Varsity Stadium	Steeplechase	1st	8:28.55
2019	US Track and Field Championships	Drake Stadium	Steeplechase	3rd	8:23.23
2019	IAAF World Championships	Khalifa International Stadium	Steeplechase	12th	8:12.47
2023	US Track and Field Championships	Hayward Field	Steeplechase	9th	8:27.38

=== Personal records ===
Surface	Event	Time	Date	Venue
Indoor track	1500m	3:43.08	10 Feb 2018	Reggie Lewis Center
Indoor track	One mile	3:57.75	28 Jan 2011	Gladstein Fieldhouse
Indoor track	3000m	7:42.33	20 Feb 2016	New York, NY
Indoor track	5000m	13:24.67	28 Feb 2020	Boston University
Outdoor track	1500m	3:34.47	06 Jul 2013	Oordegem, BEL
Outdoor track	One mile	3:52.90	27 Jul 2013	Olympic Stadium
Outdoor track	3000m	7:38.90	09 Jul 2017	Olympic Stadium
Outdoor track	Steeplechase	8:12.47	04 Oct 2019	Khalifa International Stadium
