= 2003 NCAA Division I Indoor Track and Field Championships =

- Organisers: NCAA
- Edition: 39th (Men); 21st (Women)
- Dates: March 14-15, 2003
- Host city: Fayetteville, Arkansas
- Venue: Randal Tyson Track Center
- Level: Division I

The 2003 NCAA Division I Indoor Track and Field Championships were contested to determine the individual and team national champions of men's and women's NCAA collegiate indoor track and field events in the United States after the 2002–03 season, the 39th annual meet for men and 21st annual meet for women.

For the fourth consecutive year, the championships were held at the Randal Tyson Track Center at the University of Arkansas in Fayetteville, Arkansas.

Arkansas won the men's title, the Razorbacks' seventeenth and first since 2000.

Defending champions LSU won the women's title, the Lady Tigers' tenth.

== Qualification ==
All teams and athletes from Division I indoor track and field programs were eligible to compete for this year's individual and team titles.

== Team standings ==
- Note: Top 10 only
- Scoring: 6 points for a 1st-place finish in an event, 4 points for 2nd, 3 points for 3rd, 2 points for 4th, and 1 point for 5th
- (DC) = Defending Champions
- † = Participation vacated by NCAA Committee on Infractions

=== Men's title ===
- 53 teams scored at least one point

Rank	Team	Points
1st place, gold medalist(s)	Arkansas	54
2nd place, silver medalist(s)	Auburn	30
3rd place, bronze medalist(s)	LSU	25
4	South Carolina	24
T5	Tennessee (DC)	23
T5	Villanova	23
7	Minnesota	21
8	Indiana	20
T9	Mississippi State	18
T9	Nebraska	18
T9	Stanford	18
T9	Texas	18

=== Women's title ===
- 54 teams scored at least one point

Rank	Team	Points
1st place, gold medalist(s)	LSU (DC)	62
2nd place, silver medalist(s)	Florida	44
2nd place, silver medalist(s)	South Carolina	44
4	North Carolina	38
5	Texas	35
6	Stanford	32
7	Auburn	29
8	Indiana	24
8	UCLA	24
10	Arkansas	22

== See also ==
- 2002 NCAA Division I Cross Country Championships
- 2003 NCAA Division I Outdoor Track and Field Championships
