= Willie May =

American hurdler (1936–2012)

Personal information
- Born: November 11, 1936 Knoxville, Alabama, United States
- Died: March 28, 2012 (aged 75)
Medal record
Men's athletics
Representing the United States
Olympic Games
Silver medal – second place	1960 Rome	110m Hurdles
Pan American Games
Silver medal – second place	1963 Sao Paulo	110 m Hurdles

Willie Lee May (November 11, 1936 – March 28, 2012) was an American hurdler.

Born in Knoxville, Alabama, May attended Indiana University, where he won seven Big Ten championships in the hurdles between 1957 and 1959. He won the silver medal at the 1960 Summer Olympics in Rome. May ran 13.99 in that race and was beaten by Lee Calhoun, another American, who ran 13.98. After earning another silver medal at the 1963 Pan American Games, May decided to begin his teaching and coaching career.

Willie May burst onto the Illinois Track & Field scene in 1955, leading Blue Island High School, now Eisenhower High, to an Illinois State Championship while personally collecting three gold medals in the 120-yard high hurdles, 180-yard low hurdles and in 880-yard relay - See more at: http://evanstonnow.com/story/sports/bill-smith/2012-03-29/48718/olympic-medalist-and-former-eths-athletic-director-dies#sthash.HixRMJVj.dpuf

May became the head coach of the track and field team at Evanston Township High School in 1975 and continued in that position through the 2006 season. He served as the athletic director at ETHS for 17 years, from 1983 to 2000. As a coach, May led the Wildkits to 24 consecutive Central Suburban League conference championships from 1976 to 1999, five IHSA state trophies, and one state championship (1979). Coach May has been inducted into the Indiana University Athletic Hall of Fame (2000), the Illinois Track & Cross Country Coaches Association Hall of Fame (2007) and the Chicagoland Sports Hall of Fame (2010). He died at 75 years old of complications from amyloidosis.
