= Rachelle Boone-Smith =

American sprinter

Medal record

Representing the United States

Women's athletics

World Championships
Silver medal – second place	2005 Helsinki	200 m

Rachelle Boone-Smith, née Rachelle Boone, (June 30, 1981) is an American former sprint athlete.

She won the 200 metres silver medal at the 2005 World Championships in Athletics. Prior to the 2005 World Championships she had competed only in one international major event, namely the 2004 World Indoor Championships where she did not reach the final.

Boone was an All-American sprinter for the Indiana Hoosiers track and field team, finishing runner-up in the 200 m at the 2001 and 2002 NCAA Division I Indoor Track and Field Championships.

== Personal bests ==
- 100 metres : 11.02 (2006)
- 200 metres : 22.22 (2005)

== International competitions ==
Year	Competition	Venue	Position	Event	Notes
2004	World Indoor Championships	Budapest, Hungary	7th (semis)	200 m	23.53
2005	World Championships	Helsinki, Finland	2nd	200 m	22.31

== See also ==
- List of World Championships in Athletics medalists (women)
