= 1988 NCAA Division I Indoor Track and Field Championships =

- Host city: Oklahoma City, Oklahoma
- Venue: Myriad Convention Center

The 1988 NCAA Division I Indoor Track and Field Championships were contested March 14−15, 1988 at the Myriad Convention Center in Oklahoma City, Oklahoma to determine the individual and team national champions of men's and women's NCAA collegiate indoor track and field events in the United States. These were the 24th annual men's championships and the 6th annual women's championships.

Four-time defending champions Arkansas claimed the men's team title, the Razorbacks' fifth overall title and, ultimately, the fifth of twelve straight titles for Arkansas.

In the women's championship, meanwhile, Texas claimed their second overall team title and second in three years.

== Qualification ==
All teams and athletes from Division I indoor track and field programs were eligible to compete for this year's individual and team titles.

== Team standings ==
- Note: Top 10 only
- Scoring: 6 points for a 1st-place finish in an event, 4 points for 2nd, 3 points for 3rd, 2 points for 4th, and 1 point for 5th
- (DC) = Defending Champions
- Full results

=== Men's title ===
Rank	Team	Points
1st place, gold medalist(s)	Arkansas (DC)	34
2nd place, silver medalist(s)	Illinois	29
3rd place, bronze medalist(s)	Florida	26
4	LSU	24
5	Manhattan	17
6	NC State	16
7	Auburn; Baylor; Boise State; Pittsburgh	14

=== Women's title ===
Rank	Team	Points
1st place, gold medalist(s)	Texas	71
2nd place, silver medalist(s)	Villanova	52
3rd place, bronze medalist(s)	Alabama	33
4	USC	32
5	Nebraska	21
6	LSU (DC)	17
7	Indiana	16
8	Arizona State; Washington	14
10	Florida; Tennessee	12
