= Keisha Spencer =

Jamaican triple jumper

Personal information
- Nationality: Jamaican
- Born: 16 February 1978 (age 48)

Sport
- Sport: Athletics
- Event: Triple jump

Keisha Spencer (born 16 February 1978) is a Jamaican athlete. She competed in the women's triple jump at the 2000 Summer Olympics.

While at Louisiana State University, she won the Honda Sports Award as the nation's best female track and field competitor in 2000.
