= Greg Bell (long jumper) =

American long jumper (1930–2025)

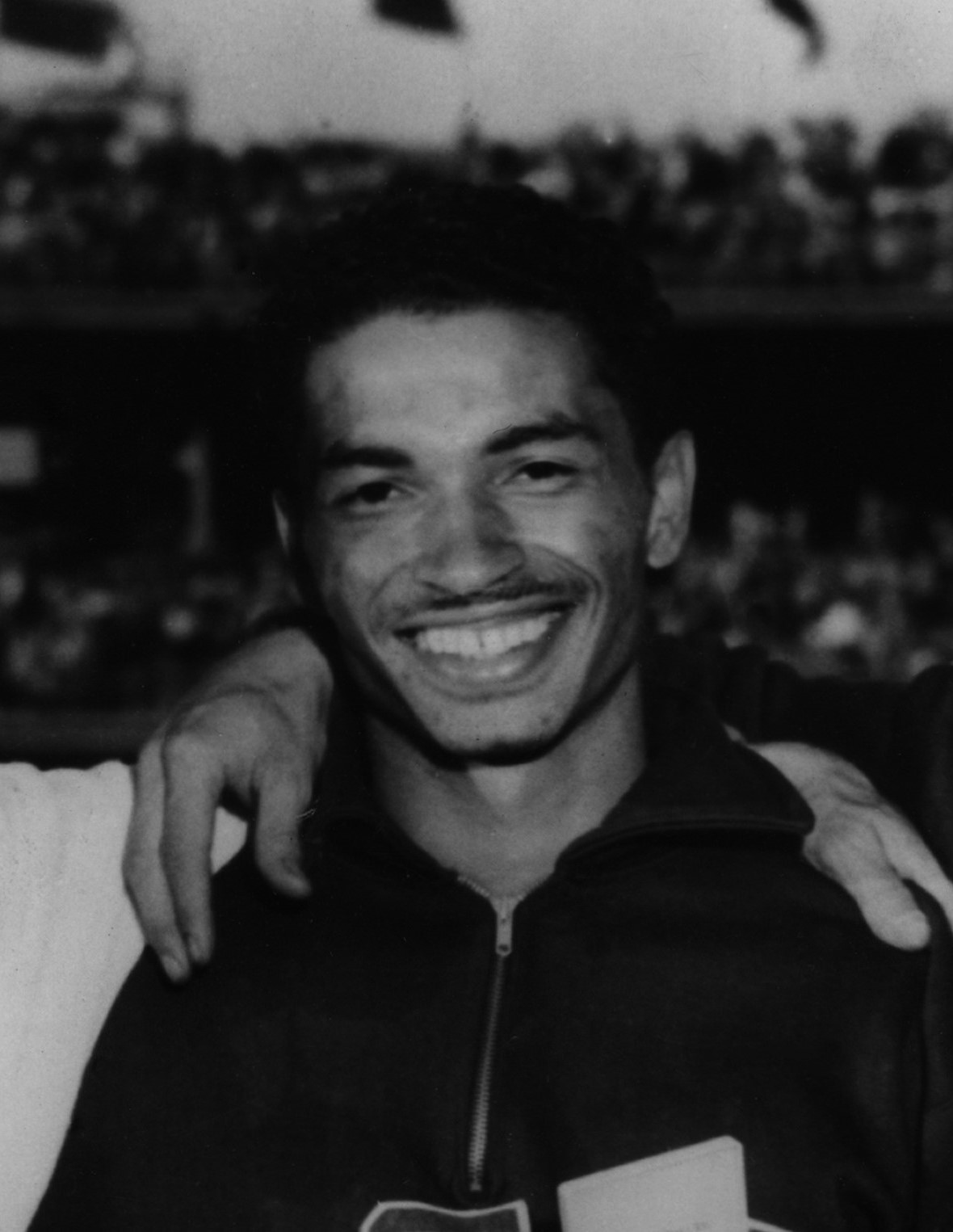
- Bell in 1956

Personal information
- Full name: Gregory Curtis Bell
- Born: November 7, 1930 Terre Haute, Indiana, U.S.
- Died: January 25, 2025 (aged 94) Logansport, Indiana, U.S.
Medal record
Men's athletics
Representing the United States
Olympic Games
Gold medal – first place	1956 Melbourne	Long jump
Pan American Games
Silver medal – second place	1959 Chicago	Long jump

Gregory Curtis Bell (November 7, 1930 – January 25, 2025) was an American track and field athlete who won the gold medal in the long jump at the 1956 Summer Olympics in Melbourne, Australia.

== Life and career ==
Bell was born in Terre Haute, Indiana, on November 7, 1930. He won three national AAU championships, two NCAA Championships, earned NCAA All-American status three times and was a four-time national AAU All-American. From 1956 to 1958, he was ranked first in the world in the long jump. He set an NCAA record in the long jump, which stood for seven years, and is a charter member of both the Indiana Track and Field and IU Athletic halls of fame.

June 1981, at age 50 Bell long jumped 20'-0 1/2" and ran the 100 meters in 12.22.

He was inducted into the USATF Hall of Fame in 1988. Following his appearance in the Summer Olympics, he worked as director of dentistry at Logansport State Hospital for over 50 years and retired on 30 May 2020.

Bell died in Logansport, Indiana, on January 25, 2025, at the age of 94.

== Championships ==
- 1955 AAU: Long Jump (1st)
- 1956 Olympics: Long Jump – 7.83 m (1st)
- 1956 NCAA: Long Jump – (1st)
- 1957 NCAA: Long Jump – 8.10 m (1st)
- 1957 Penn Relays: Long Jump
- 1957 Penn Relays: 100-meter dash
- 1959 Pan American Games: Long Jump (2nd)

== Honors ==
- 1957 Penn Relays: Most Outstanding Athlete
