= 1940 NCAA track and field championships =

1940 NCAA Track and Field Championships
- Edition: 19th
- Dates: June 21-22, 1940
- Host city: Minneapolis, Minnesota
- Venue: Memorial Stadium
- Events: 14

The 1940 NCAA Track and Field Championships was the 19th NCAA track and field championship. The event was held at the University of Minnesota's Memorial Stadium in June 1940. The University of Southern California won its sixth consecutive team title.

The meet took place during a two-day downpour that flooded the stadium and forced the field events to be moved indoors at the Minnesota field house.

== Team result ==
| Rank | Team | Points |
|---|---|---|
| 1st place, gold medalist(s) | USC | 44 |
| 2nd place, silver medalist(s) | Stanford | 28 2/3 |
| 3rd place, bronze medalist(s) | California; Penn State | 24 |
| 4 | LSU | 22 |
| 5 | Indiana; Texas | 20 |
| 6 | Michigan | 19 |
| 7 | Nebraska | 18 1/3 |
| 8 | Washington State; Tufts; Rice | 18 |

== Track events ==
=== 100-yard dash ===
1. Barney Ewell, Penn State - 9.6 seconds
2. Clyde Jeffrey, Stanford
3. Bill Brown, LSU
4. Harold Stickel, Pitt
5. Leo Tarrant, Alabama State

=== 120-yard high hurdles ===
1. Ed Dugger, Tufts - 13.9 seconds (NCAA record, tied American record)
2. Fred Wolcott, Rice
3. Boyce Gatewood, Texas
4. Frank Fuller, Virginia
5. Jim McGoldrick, Washington

=== 220-yard dash ===
1. Barney Ewell, Penn State - 21.1 seconds (American record)
2. Billy Brown, LSU
3. Mickey Anderson, USC
4. Leo Tarrant, Alabama State
5. George Koettel, Oklahoma

=== 220-yard low hurdles ===
1. Fred Wolcott, Rice - 23.1 seconds
2. Ed Dugger, Tufts
3. Boyce Gatewood, Texas
4. Jim Buck, Oregon
5. Harold Stickel, Pitt

=== 440-yard dash ===
1. Lee Orr, Washington State - 47.3 seconds
2. Gene Littler, Nebraska
3. Howard Upton, USC
4. Warren Breidenbach, Michigan
5. Fred Alliniece, Prairie View Texas State

=== 880-yard run ===
1. Campbell Kane, Indiana - 1:51.5
2. Ed Burrowes, Princeton
3. Paul Moore, Stanford
4. James Kehoe, Maryland
5. Denzil Wiedil, California

=== One-mile run ===
1. John Munski, Missouri
2. Leslie MacMitchell, NYU
3. Lou Zamperini, USC
4. Mason Chronister, Maryland
5. Max Lenover, Loyola of Chicago

=== Two-mile run ===
1. Roy Fehr, Michigan State - 9 minutes, 18.9 seconds
2. Dixon Garner, Washington State
3. Ralph Scwarzkopf, Michigan
4. Tom Quinn, Michigan Normal
5. Ray Harris, Kansas

== Field events ==
=== Long jump ===
1. Jackie Robinson, UCLA - 24 feet, 10 1/4 inches
2. Billy Brown, LSU
3. Welles Hodgson, Minnesota
4. Pat Turner, UCLA
5. William Lacefield, UCLA

=== High jump ===
1. Don Canham, Michigan - 6 feet, 6 3/8 inches
1. John Wilson, USC - 6 feet, 6 3/8 inches
3. Alfred Flechner, Idaho
4. Don Boydston, Oklahoma A&M
4. Joshua Williamson, Xavier of New Orleans
4. Russell Wulff, Stanford

=== Pole vault ===
1. Kenny Dills, USC - 13 feet, 10 inches
2. Quinn Smith, California
3. George Hoffman, Fresno State
4. Ralph Ross, Army
5. William Williams, Wisconsin

=== Discus throw ===
1. Archie Harris, Indiana - 162 feet, 4 1/2 inches
2. Jack Hughes, Texas - 161 feet, 6 inches
3. Al Blozis, Georgetown - 161 feet, 5 inches
4. A. Cornet, Stanford
5. Edsel Wibbels, Nebraska

=== Javelin ===
1. Martin Biles, California - 204 feet, 10 inches
2. Herbert Grote, Nebraska
3. Boyd Brown, Oregon
4. Nick Vukmanic, Penn State
5. Clarence Gehrke, Utah

=== Shot put ===
1. Al Blozis, Georgetown - 56 feet, 1/2 inch
2. Stan Anderson, Stanford
3. Herb Michael, California
4. Don McNeil, USC
5. John Mazyk, Pitt

== See also ==
- NCAA Men's Outdoor Track and Field Championship
- 1939 NCAA Men's Cross Country Championships
