= Lennox Burgher =

Jamaican triple jumper

Personal information
- Full name: Lennox Garth Burgher
- Nationality: Jamaican
- Born: 17 March 1946 (age 80)

Sport
- Sport: Athletics
- Event: Triple jump

Lennox G. Burgher (born 17 March 1946) is a Jamaican athlete. He competed in the men's triple jump at the 1968 Summer Olympics.

Burgher is from Kingston, Jamaica. Competing for the Nebraska Cornhuskers track and field team, Burgher won the 1968 NCAA Division I Outdoor Track and Field Championships in the triple jump.
