= 1941 NCAA track and field championships =

1941 NCAA Track and Field Championships
- Team Champion: USC (10th title)
- Edition: 20th
- Dates: June 20-21, 1941
- Host city: Stanford, California
- Venue: Stanford Stadium

Meet highlights

The 1941 NCAA Track and Field Championships were the 20th annual track meet to determine the team and individual national champions of men's collegiate track and field in the United States. This year's events were held at Stanford Stadium at Stanford University in Stanford, California.

USC captured the team national championship, their tenth.

== Team result ==
- Note: Top 10 finishers only

Rank	Team	Points
1st place, gold medalist(s)	USC	81½
2nd place, silver medalist(s)	Indiana	50
3rd place, bronze medalist(s)	California	49¼
4	Ohio State	25
5	LSU	24
6	Penn State	20
7	Georgetown; NYU	18
8	Nebraska	14
9	Notre Dame; Oregon	10
10	Miami (OH)	9

== See also ==
- NCAA Men's Outdoor Track and Field Championship
- 1940 NCAA Men's Cross Country Championships
