= Robert Howard (triple jumper) =

American triple and long jumper

Personal information
- Full name: Robert R. Howard
- Born: November 26, 1975 Brooklyn, New York, U.S.
- Died: August 14, 2004 (aged 28) Little Rock, Arkansas, U.S.
- Occupation: Athlete
- Height: 5 ft 10 in (178 cm)
- Weight: 165 lb (75 kg)
Medal record
Representing United States
Summer Universiade
Bronze medal – third place	1997 Catania	Triple jump

Robert R. Howard (November 26, 1975 – August 14, 2004) was an American triple and long jumper, a nine-time NCAA collegiate champion, and murderer.

== Collegiate career ==
In choosing a college, Howard elected to follow in the lengthy horizontal jumping tradition at the University of Arkansas, where he would follow in the footsteps of such luminary jumpers as Mike Conley, Sr., Edrick Floreal, Jérôme Romain, Brian Wellman and Erick Walder.

Putting his own stamp on the track program, Howard won nine individual collegiate championships while jumping for Arkansas:

Event	Years won
NCAA Indoor Triple Jump	1996, 1997, 1999
NCAA Indoor Long Jump	1997
NCAA Outdoor Triple Jump	1996, 1997, 1998
NCAA Outdoor Long Jump	1997, 1998

During this time, the Razorback team, under the guidance of legendary coach John McDonnell, itself won seven of the eight available NCAA team titles, indoors and out.

Howard competed at the 1997 World University Games, finishing third in the triple jump. In 1997, he was named Collegiate Athlete of the Year by Track and Field News magazine for winning all four jumps in the two NCAA championship competitions.

All of Howard's personal records were set while he was a collegian:

Event	Outdoors best	Year	Indoors best	Year
Triple Jump	17.11m	1998	17.04m	1997
Long Jump	8.40m	1997	8.16m	1997

== Professional career ==
In 1999, Howard missed the majority of the season with an injury.

Howard qualified for the US Olympic team in the triple jump twice, making the finals in both Atlanta and Sydney. He finished seventh in 1996 and eighth in 2000. He won the triple jump competition at the 2000 Olympic Trials with a leap of 55-9 (16.99). His best finish in USATF competitions was a second in the triple jump in 2001.

Admitted to medical school in 1999, Howard worked in his jumping around his schooling, studying at the University of Arkansas for Medical Sciences to be a neurosurgeon. He had deferred his medical studies for one year to train for the 2000 Olympics and again for the 2004 Olympics. He finished fifth in the 2004 Olympic Trials, falling short in his attempt to make the Olympic team for the third time.

== Rankings ==
During his career, Howard was ranked among the top jumpers in the US by Track and Field News.

Year	Event	World rank	US rank
1996	Triple Jump	10th	3rd
1997	Triple Jump	-	2nd
	Long Jump	-	7th
1998	Triple Jump	-	2nd
	Long Jump	-	9th
1998	Triple Jump	-	2nd
	Long Jump	-	9th
2000	Triple Jump	-	1st
	Long Jump	-	5th
2001	Triple Jump	-	3rd
	Long Jump	-	9th
2002	Triple Jump	-	9th

== Death ==
On August 14, 2004, shortly after his failure to make the Olympic team and in the opening hours of the 2004 Summer Olympics in Athens, Howard violently murdered his wife, Robin Mitchell, the chief neurosurgery resident at UAMS who was named a "soaring medical star" by the Times Herald Record, and later leapt to his death from the 10th story of a medical school dormitory. Police found Mitchell dead in the couple's bed with dozens of stab wounds to the head and torso.
