= 1949 NCAA Track and Field Championships =

- Edition: 28th
- Dates: June 17-18, 1949
- Host city: Los Angeles, California
- Venue: Los Angeles Memorial Coliseum

The 1949 NCAA Track and Field Championships were contested at the 28th annual NCAA-hosted track meet to determine the team and individual national champions of men's collegiate track and field events in the United States. This year's meet was hosted by the University of Southern California at the Los Angeles Memorial Coliseum in Los Angeles.

Hosts USC claimed the team national championship, their thirteenth title (and first since winning nine consecutive titles between 1935 and 1943).

== Team Result ==
- Note: Top 10 only
- (H) = Hosts

Rank	Team	Points
1st place, gold medalist(s)	Southern California (H)	55 2/5
2nd place, silver medalist(s)	UCLA	31
3rd place, bronze medalist(s)	Stanford	30
4	Michigan State	26
5	Penn State	25
6	Seton Hall	23
7	Wisconsin; Yale	22
8	Ohio State	16
9	Brown; Cornell; Missouri; San Diego; Tulane	10
10	Santa Barbara College	9

== See also ==
- NCAA Men's Outdoor Track and Field Championship
- 1948 NCAA Men's Cross Country Championships
