= 2004 NCAA Division I Outdoor Track and Field Championships =

- Edition: 83rd (Men); 23rd (Women)
- Dates: June 9–12, 2004
- Host city: Austin, Texas; University of Texas
- Venue: Mike A. Myers Stadium

The 2004 NCAA Division I Outdoor Track and Field Championships were contested at the 83rd annual NCAA-sanctioned track meet to determine the individual and team champions of men's and women's Division I collegiate outdoor track and field in the United States.

This year's meet, the 23rd with both men's and women's championships, was held June 9–12, 2004 at Mike A. Myers Stadium at the University of Texas in Austin, Texas.

Defending champions Arkansas won the men's title, although the win was later vacated by the NCAA. No other team has since been awarded the title.

UCLA won the women's title, the Bruins' third and first since 1983.

== Team results ==
- Note: Top 10 only
- (DC) = Defending champions
- Full results

=== Men's standings ===
| Rank | Team | Points |
|---|---|---|
| 1st place, gold medalist(s) | ~~Arkansas~~ (DC) | 65.5 |
| 2nd place, silver medalist(s) | Florida | 49 |
| 3rd place, bronze medalist(s) | LSU | 31 |
| 4 | Ohio State; SMU; TCU | 30 |
| 7 | Baylor | 27 |
| 8 | Texas Tech | 26.5 |
| 9 | Oregon | 26 |
| 10 | Arizona State; Wisconsin | 22 |

=== Women's standings ===
| Rank | Team | Points |
|---|---|---|
| 1st place, gold medalist(s) | UCLA | 69 |
| 2nd place, silver medalist(s) | LSU (DC) | 68 |
| 3rd place, bronze medalist(s) | Nebraska | 58 |
| 4 | Texas | 42 |
| 5 | Florida | 29 |
| 6 | Stanford | 27 |
| 7 | Georgia; South Carolina; Tennessee | 24 |
| 10 | Arkansas; Miami (FL) | 22 |
