= 2005 NCAA Division I Outdoor Track and Field Championships =

- Edition: 84th (Men); 24th (Women)
- Dates: June 11–14, 2005
- Host city: (California) Sacramento, California; Sacramento State University
- Venue: Hornet Stadium

Day 3 broadcast

The 2005 NCAA Division I Outdoor Track and Field Championships were contested at the 84th annual NCAA-sanctioned track meet to determine the individual and team champions of men's and women's Division I collegiate outdoor track and field in the United States.

This year's meet, the 24th with both men's and women's championships, was held June 11–14, 2005 at Hornet Stadium at Sacramento State University in Sacramento, California.

Two-time defending champions Arkansas won the men's title, although the Razorbacks' win would later be vacated by the NCAA (alongside their 2004 victory). No other team has since been awarded the title.

Texas won the women's title, the Longhorns' fourth and first since 1999.

== Team results ==
- Note: Top 10 only
- (DC) = Defending champions
- Full results

=== Men's standings ===
Rank	Team	Points
1st place, gold medalist(s)	~~Arkansas~~	60
2nd place, silver medalist(s)	Florida	49
3rd place, bronze medalist(s)	LSU	36
4	BYU; Florida State	34
6	USC	33
7	Stanford	28
8	Texas	25
9	Arizona; Auburn; Oregon	23

=== Women's standings ===
Rank	Team	Points
1st place, gold medalist(s)	Texas	55
2nd place, silver medalist(s)	South Carolina; UCLA (DC)	48
4	Tennessee	40
5	Stanford	29
6	Georgia	28
7	USC	25
8	Nebraska	24
9	Miami (FL)	23
10	BYU; Florida	22
