= 2003 NCAA Division I Outdoor Track and Field Championships =

- Edition: 82nd (Men); 22nd (Women)
- Dates: June 11–14, 2003
- Host city: (California) Sacramento, California; Sacramento State University
- Venue: Hornet Stadium

Final day broadcast

The 2003 NCAA Division I Outdoor Track and Field Championships were contested at the 82nd annual NCAA-sanctioned track meet to determine the individual and team champions of men's and women's Division I collegiate outdoor track and field in the United States.

This year's meet, the 22nd edition with men's and women's events held concurrently, was contested June 11–14, 2003 at Hornet Stadium at Sacramento State University in Sacramento, California.

Arkansas won the men's title, the Razorbacks' tenth title and first since winning eight consecutive titles between 1992 and 1999.

LSU won the women's title, the Lady Tigers' then-record thirteenth championship and first since 2000.

== Team results ==
- Note: Top 10 only
- (DC) = Defending champions
- Full results

=== Men's standings ===
Rank	Team	Points
1st place, gold medalist(s)	Arkansas	59
2nd place, silver medalist(s)	Auburn	50
3rd place, bronze medalist(s)	USC	41.5
4	LSU (DC)	36
5	Nebraska	33
6	Florida	32
7	Stanford; Tennessee	30
9	Minnesota	29
10	South Carolina	22

=== Women's standings ===
Rank	Team	Points
1st place, gold medalist(s)	LSU	64
2nd place, silver medalist(s)	Texas	50
3rd place, bronze medalist(s)	South Carolina (DC)	47
4	Florida	36
5	Nebraska	33
6	Indiana	32
7	North Carolina	30
8	UCLA	28
9	Stanford	27
10	Penn State	24
