= 1984 NCAA Division I Outdoor Track and Field Championships =

1983 NCAA Division I Outdoor Track and Field Championships
- Men's Champion: Oregon (5th title); Women's Champion: Florida State (1st title)
- Edition: 63rd (Men); 3rd (Women)
- Dates: May 28 – June 2, 1984
- Host city: Eugene, Oregon
- Venue: Hayward Field; University of Oregon

The 1984 NCAA Division I Outdoor Track and Field Championships were contested May 28 − June 2, 1984 at Hayward Field at the University of Oregon in Eugene, Oregon in order to determine the individual and team national champions of men's and women's collegiate Division I outdoor track and field events in the United States.

These were the 63rd annual men's championships and the third annual women's championships. This was the Ducks' fifth time hosting the event and the first since 1978.

Oregon and Florida State topped the men's and women's team standings, respectively; it was the Ducks' fifth men's team title and the first for the Seminole women.

== Team results ==
- Note: Top 10 only
- (H) = Hosts

=== Men's title ===
Rank	Team	Points
1st place, gold medalist(s)	Oregon (H)	113
2nd place, silver medalist(s)	Washington State	94 1/2
3rd place, bronze medalist(s)	Arkansas	85
4	SMU	73
5	Southern Illinois	55
6	Arizona	53
7	UCLA	50 1/2
8	BYU	49
9	Oklahoma State	46
10	Indiana; Iowa State	45

=== Women's title ===
Rank	Team	Points
1st place, gold medalist(s)	Florida State	145
2nd place, silver medalist(s)	Tennessee	124
3rd place, bronze medalist(s)	Stanford	71
4	Oregon (H)	64
5	Nebraska	60
6	Alabama	53
7	Wisconsin	49
8	Arizona State	47
9	Texas Southern	42
10	Florida	40
