= 1987 NCAA Division I outdoor track and field championships =

1987 NCAA Division I Outdoor Track and Field Championships
- Men's Champion: UCLA (7th title); Women's Champion: LSU (1st title)
- Edition: 66th (Men); 6th (Women)
- Dates: June 3−6, 1987
- Host city: Baton Rouge, Louisiana
- Venue: Bernie Moore Track Stadium; Louisiana State University

The 1987 NCAA Division I Outdoor Track and Field Championships were contested June 3−6, 1987, at the Bernie Moore Track Stadium at Louisiana State University in Baton Rouge, Louisiana in order to determine the individual and team national champions of men's and women's collegiate Division I outdoor track and field events in the United States.

These were the 66th annual men's championships and the sixth annual women's championships. This was the Tigers and Lady Tigers' third time hosting the event (although first as a combined men's and women's event) and the first since 1987.

UCLA and LSU topped the men's and women's team standings, respectively; it was the Bruins' seventh men's team title and the first for the Lady Tigers. LSU's title would ultimately be the first of a record eleven consecutive national championships stretching from 1987 to 1997.

== Team results ==
- Note: Top 10 only
- (H) = Hosts
- Full results

=== Men's standings ===
Rank	Team	Points
1st place, gold medalist(s)	UCLA	81
2nd place, silver medalist(s)	Texas	28
3rd place, bronze medalist(s)	TCU	27
4	Arkansas	26
5	LSU (H)	25
6	Texas A&M; Texas Southern	23
8	Illinois	20
9	BYU	19
10	Baylor; Boston University; George Mason	18

=== Women's standings ===
Rank	Team	Points
1st place, gold medalist(s)	LSU (H)	62
2nd place, silver medalist(s)	Alabama	53
3rd place, bronze medalist(s)	USC	51
4	Tennessee	33
5	Texas	28 1/2
6	BYU; UCLA	27
8	Texas Southern	26
9	Oregon	25
10	Florida State	22
