= USC Trojans track and field =

College track and field team

- University: University of Southern California
- Head coach: Quincy Watts
- Conference: Big Ten
- Location: Los Angeles, California
- Outdoor track: Felix Field and Loker Stadium
- Nickname: Trojans
- Colors: Cardinal and gold

NCAA Indoor National Championships
- Men: 1967, 1972, 2025

NCAA Outdoor National Championships
- Men: 1926, 1930, 1931, 1935, 1936, 1937, 1938, 1939, 1940, 1941, 1942, 1943, 1949, 1950, 1951, 1952, 1953, 1954, 1955, 1958, 1961, 1963, 1965, 1967, 1968, 1976, 2025; Women: 2001, 2018, 2021

The USC Trojans track and field team is the track and field program that represents University of Southern California. The Trojans compete in NCAA Division I as a member of the Big Ten Conference. The team is based in Los Angeles, California, at the Felix Field and Loker Stadium.

The program is coached by Quincy Watts. The track and field program officially encompasses four teams because the NCAA considers men's and women's indoor track and field and outdoor track and field as separate sports.

As of 2024, the Trojans have had 512 Olympians, including 66 at the 2024 Summer Olympics with track and field being the most represented sport. In 2023, the school named their field after Allyson Felix, who attended USC along with her brother Wes Felix, though Allyson turned professional out of high school and did not compete for the team.

The programs have won 3 indoor and 30 outdoor national team titles. The men's team additionally originally won the 1978 NCAA Division I Outdoor Track and Field Championships, but the title was revoked two years later after their sprinter Billy Mullins was found to be ineligible.

In 2018, Michael Norman became the first athlete from USC to win The Bowerman.

== Postseason ==
=== AIAW ===
The Bruins have had six AIAW individual All-Americans finishing in the top six at the AIAW indoor or outdoor championships.

AIAW All-Americans
Championships	Name	Event	Place
1970 Outdoor	Sherry Calvert	Javelin throw	1st
1972 Outdoor	Sherry Calvert	Javelin throw	1st
1975 Outdoor	Rosetta Birt	100 yards	3rd
1975 Outdoor	Rosetta Birt	Sprint medley relay	3rd
1975 Outdoor	Angela Hunter	Sprint medley relay	3rd
1975 Outdoor	Harrieth Knight	Sprint medley relay	3rd
1975 Outdoor	Anna Biller	Sprint medley relay	3rd
1977 Outdoor	Patty Van Wolvelaere	100 meters hurdles	1st
1977 Outdoor	Rosetta Birt	4 × 110 yards relay	6th
1977 Outdoor	Jackie Gordon	4 × 110 yards relay	6th
1977 Outdoor	Anna Biller	4 × 110 yards relay	6th
1977 Outdoor	Patty Van Wolvelaere	4 × 110 yards relay	6th
1978 Outdoor	Gail Douglas	100 meters	4th
1978 Outdoor	Patty Van Wolvelaere	100 meters hurdles	1st
1978 Outdoor	Mitzi McMillin	100 meters hurdles	6th
1978 Outdoor	Gail Douglas	4 × 100 meters relay	5th
1978 Outdoor	Patty Van Wolvelaere	4 × 100 meters relay	5th
1978 Outdoor	Mitzi McMillin	4 × 100 meters relay	5th
1978 Outdoor	Rosetta Birt	4 × 100 meters relay	5th
1979 Outdoor	Gail Douglas	4 × 110 yards relay	4th
1979 Outdoor	Kim Robinson	4 × 110 yards relay	4th
1979 Outdoor	Sandra Crabtree	4 × 110 yards relay	4th
1979 Outdoor	Linda Cassidy	4 × 110 yards relay	4th
1979 Outdoor	Sandra Crabtree	Long jump	5th

=== NCAA ===
As of April 2025, a total of 385 men and 95 women have achieved individual first-team All-American status at the Division I men's outdoor, women's outdoor, men's indoor, or women's indoor national championships (using the modern criteria of top-8 placing regardless of athlete nationality).

First team NCAA All-Americans
Team	Championships	Name	Event	Place	Ref.
Men's	1923 Outdoor	Yale Martz	400 meters	6th	
Men's	1923 Outdoor	Otto Anderson	Long jump	4th	
Men's	1923 Outdoor	Otto Anderson	220 yards hurdles	3rd	
Men's	1923 Outdoor	Norm Anderson	Shot put	1st	
Men's	1923 Outdoor	Norm Anderson	Discus throw	4th	
Men's	1926 Outdoor	Kenneth Grumbles	220 yards hurdles	2nd	
Men's	1926 Outdoor	Edgar House	100 meters	7th	
Men's	1926 Outdoor	Leighton Dye	110 meters hurdles	2nd	
Men's	1926 Outdoor	Clifton Reynolds	110 meters hurdles	4th	
Men's	1926 Outdoor	Henry Coggeshall	High jump	3rd	
Men's	1926 Outdoor	Clifton Reynolds	Long jump	3rd	
Men's	1926 Outdoor	Bud Houser	Shot put	2nd	
Men's	1926 Outdoor	Bud Houser	Discus throw	1st	
Men's	1926 Outdoor	Andrew Cook	Javelin throw	5th	
Men's	1929 Outdoor	James Payne	220 yards hurdles	3rd	
Men's	1929 Outdoor	Ernie Payne	220 yards hurdles	6th	
Men's	1929 Outdoor	Jack Williams	Pole vault	5th	
Men's	1929 Outdoor	Jess Hill	Long jump	2nd	
Men's	1929 Outdoor	Howard Paul	Long jump	3rd	
Men's	1929 Outdoor	Jess Mortensen	Javelin throw	1st	
Men's	1930 Outdoor	Ernie Payne	220 yards hurdles	5th	
Men's	1930 Outdoor	Frank Wykoff	100 meters	1st	
Men's	1930 Outdoor	Victor Williams	400 meters	2nd	
Men's	1930 Outdoor	Bill McGeagh	800 meters	5th	
Men's	1930 Outdoor	Jim Stewart	High jump	1st	
Men's	1930 Outdoor	Bob van Osdel	High jump	2nd	
Men's	1930 Outdoor	William Hubbard	Pole vault	2nd	
Men's	1930 Outdoor	William Livingston	Pole vault	6th	
Men's	1930 Outdoor	Pete Chlentzos	Pole vault	6th	
Men's	1930 Outdoor	Dick Barber	Long jump	3rd	
Men's	1930 Outdoor	Robert Hall	Discus throw	4th	
Men's	1930 Outdoor	Jess Mortensen	Javelin throw	3rd	
Men's	1930 Outdoor	Jim Snider	Javelin throw	7th	
Men's	1930 Outdoor	William Carls	220 yards hurdles	2nd	
Men's	1930 Outdoor	Ernie Payne	220 yards hurdles	8th	
Men's	1931 Outdoor	Frank Wykoff	100 meters	1st	
Men's	1931 Outdoor	Bill Stokes	110 meters hurdles	6th	
Men's	1931 Outdoor	Roy Delby	200 meters	5th	
Men's	1931 Outdoor	Victor Williams	400 meters	1st	
Men's	1931 Outdoor	Art Woessner	400 meters	3rd	
Men's	1931 Outdoor	Will Brannan	High jump	3rd	
Men's	1931 Outdoor	Jim Stewart	High jump	6th	
Men's	1931 Outdoor	Bill Graber	Pole vault	1st	
Men's	1931 Outdoor	Dick Barber	Long jump	3rd	
Men's	1931 Outdoor	Robert Hall	Shot put	1st	
Men's	1931 Outdoor	Robert Hall	Discus throw	1st	
Men's	1931 Outdoor	Ken McKenzie	Javelin throw	5th	
Men's	1933 Outdoor	Norman Paul	220 yards hurdles	3rd	
Men's	1933 Outdoor	Leslie Ball	100 meters	4th	
Men's	1933 Outdoor	Charles Parsons	200 meters	4th	
Men's	1933 Outdoor	Ed Albowich	400 meters	3rd	
Men's	1933 Outdoor	Harry Tompkins	400 meters	6th	
Men's	1933 Outdoor	Ferris Webster	800 meters	4th	
Men's	1933 Outdoor	Duncan McNaughton	High jump	1st	
Men's	1933 Outdoor	Bill Graber	Pole vault	1st	
Men's	1933 Outdoor	Hueston Harper	Shot put	2nd	
Men's	1933 Outdoor	Frank Williamson	Javelin throw	6th	
Men's	1934 Outdoor	Charles Parsons	100 meters	2nd	
Men's	1934 Outdoor	Foy Draper	100 meters	4th	
Men's	1934 Outdoor	Charles Parsons	200 meters	2nd	
Men's	1934 Outdoor	Foy Draper	200 meters	4th	
Men's	1934 Outdoor	John McCarthy	400 meters	3rd	
Men's	1934 Outdoor	Ed Ablowich	400 meters	5th	
Men's	1934 Outdoor	Al Fitch	400 meters	6th	
Men's	1934 Outdoor	Estel Johnson	800 meters	5th	
Men's	1934 Outdoor	Will Brannen	High jump	4th	
Men's	1934 Outdoor	James Fimple	Pole vault	3rd	
Men's	1934 Outdoor	Al Olson	Long jump	1st	
Men's	1934 Outdoor	Hueston Harper	Shot put	6th	
Men's	1934 Outdoor	Ken Carpenter	Discus throw	2nd	
Men's	1935 Outdoor	Gil Strother	220 yards hurdles	8th	
Men's	1935 Outdoor	George Boone	100 meters	6th	
Men's	1935 Outdoor	Foy Draper	100 meters	7th	
Men's	1935 Outdoor	Phil Cope	110 meters hurdles	3rd	
Men's	1935 Outdoor	Roy Staley	110 meters hurdles	4th	
Men's	1935 Outdoor	Foy Draper	200 meters	4th	
Men's	1935 Outdoor	George Boone	200 meters	6th	
Men's	1935 Outdoor	John McCarthy	400 meters	2nd	
Men's	1935 Outdoor	James Cassin	400 meters	6th	
Men's	1935 Outdoor	Ross Bush	800 meters	2nd	
Men's	1935 Outdoor	Estel Johnson	800 meters	4th	
Men's	1935 Outdoor	Earle Meadows	Pole vault	1st	
Men's	1935 Outdoor	Bill Sefton	Pole vault	1st	
Men's	1935 Outdoor	James Fimple	Pole vault	6th	
Men's	1935 Outdoor	Al Olson	Long jump	2nd	
Men's	1935 Outdoor	Paul Jungkeit	Long jump	6th	
Men's	1935 Outdoor	Ken Carpenter	Discus throw	1st	
Men's	1936 Outdoor	Leland LaFond	220 yards hurdles	6th	
Men's	1936 Outdoor	Foy Draper	100 meters	2nd	
Men's	1936 Outdoor	Adrian Talley	100 meters	4th	
Men's	1936 Outdoor	George Boone	100 meters	6th	
Men's	1936 Outdoor	Roy Staley	110 meters hurdles	4th	
Men's	1936 Outdoor	Foy Draper	200 meters	3rd	
Men's	1936 Outdoor	Clark Crane	200 meters	6th	
Men's	1936 Outdoor	Al Fitch	400 meters	2nd	
Men's	1936 Outdoor	Harold Smallwood	400 meters	3rd	
Men's	1936 Outdoor	James Cassin	400 meters	6th	
Men's	1936 Outdoor	Ross Bush	800 meters	2nd	
Men's	1936 Outdoor	Fred Lantz	5000 meters	6th	
Men's	1936 Outdoor	Delos Thurber	High jump	4th	
Men's	1936 Outdoor	Earle Meadows	Pole vault	1st	
Men's	1936 Outdoor	Bill Sefton	Pole vault	1st	
Men's	1936 Outdoor	John Hooker	Pole vault	5th	
Men's	1936 Outdoor	Loring Day	Pole vault	5th	
Men's	1936 Outdoor	George Boone	Long jump	3rd	
Men's	1936 Outdoor	Donald Skinner	Long jump	4th	
Men's	1936 Outdoor	Clark Crane	Long jump	5th	
Men's	1936 Outdoor	George Boone	Triple jump	3rd	
Men's	1936 Outdoor	Clarence Schleimer	Shot put	6th	
Men's	1936 Outdoor	Owen Hansen	Shot put	7th	
Men's	1936 Outdoor	Ken Carpenter	Discus throw	1st	
Men's	1936 Outdoor	Tex Milner	Javelin throw	5th	
Men's	1937 Outdoor	Earl Vickery	220 yards hurdles	1st	
Men's	1937 Outdoor	George Boone	100 meters	4th	
Men's	1937 Outdoor	Roy Staley	110 meters hurdles	2nd	
Men's	1937 Outdoor	Ross Bush	800 meters	2nd	
Men's	1937 Outdoor	Delos Thurber	High jump	3rd	
Men's	1937 Outdoor	Bill Sefton	Pole vault	1st	
Men's	1937 Outdoor	Earle Meadows	Pole vault	3rd	
Men's	1937 Outdoor	Irving Howe	Pole vault	4th	
Men's	1937 Outdoor	George Boone	Long jump	5th	
Men's	1937 Outdoor	Owen Hansen	Shot put	8th	
Men's	1937 Outdoor	Phil Gaspar	Discus throw	4th	
Men's	1937 Outdoor	Charles Soper	Javelin throw	5th	
Men's	1938 Outdoor	Earl Vickery	220 yards hurdles	2nd	
Men's	1938 Outdoor	Adrian Talley	100 meters	2nd	
Men's	1938 Outdoor	Mickey Anderson	100 meters	6th	
Men's	1938 Outdoor	Jim Humphrey	110 meters hurdles	5th	
Men's	1938 Outdoor	Ivy Bledsoe	110 meters hurdles	6th	
Men's	1938 Outdoor	Erwin Miller	400 meters	2nd	
Men's	1938 Outdoor	Howard Bachman	400 meters	3rd	
Men's	1938 Outdoor	Lou Zamperini	Mile run	1st	
Men's	1938 Outdoor	Delos Thurber	High jump	3rd	
Men's	1938 Outdoor	Loring Day	Pole vault	1st	
Men's	1938 Outdoor	Irving Howe	Pole vault	2nd	
Men's	1938 Outdoor	Ken Dills	Pole vault	5th	
Men's	1938 Outdoor	Art Wrotnowski	Discus throw	6th	
Men's	1938 Outdoor	Reed Trusel	Javelin throw	4th	
Men's	1939 Outdoor	Earl Vickery	220 yards hurdles	2nd	
Men's	1939 Outdoor	Barney Willis	100 meters	3rd	
Men's	1939 Outdoor	Payton Jordan	100 meters	4th	
Men's	1939 Outdoor	Mickey Anderson	100 meters	7th	
Men's	1939 Outdoor	Payton Jordan	200 meters	4th	
Men's	1939 Outdoor	Erwin Miller	400 meters	1st	
Men's	1939 Outdoor	Howard Upton	400 meters	4th	
Men's	1939 Outdoor	Lou Zamperini	Mile run	1st	
Men's	1939 Outdoor	John Wilson	High jump	1st	
Men's	1939 Outdoor	Clarke Mallery	High jump	2nd	
Men's	1939 Outdoor	Loring Day	Pole vault	2nd	
Men's	1939 Outdoor	Bob Fisher	Shot put	8th	
Men's	1939 Outdoor	Bob Peoples	Javelin throw	1st	
Men's	1939 Outdoor	Hugo Degroot	Javelin throw	3rd	
Men's	1939 Outdoor	Reed Trusel	Javelin throw	6th	
Men's	1940 Outdoor	Mickey Anderson	100 meters	4th	
Men's	1940 Outdoor	John Biewener	110 meters hurdles	6th	
Men's	1940 Outdoor	Mickey Anderson	200 meters	3rd	
Men's	1940 Outdoor	Howard Upton	400 meters	3rd	
Men's	1940 Outdoor	Lou Zamperini	Mile run	3rd	
Men's	1940 Outdoor	John Wilson	High jump	1st	
Men's	1940 Outdoor	Ken Dills	Pole vault	1st	
Men's	1940 Outdoor	Don McNeil	Shot put	4th	
Men's	1940 Outdoor	Hugo Degroot	Javelin throw	6th	
Men's	1941 Outdoor	Cliff Bourland	100 meters	3rd	
Men's	1941 Outdoor	Dean Rickman	100 meters	4th	
Men's	1941 Outdoor	John Biewener	110 meters hurdles	5th	
Men's	1941 Outdoor	Art Kacewicz	110 meters hurdles	6th	
Men's	1941 Outdoor	Cliff Bourland	200 meters	2nd	
Men's	1941 Outdoor	Hubie Kerns	200 meters	4th	
Men's	1941 Outdoor	Hubie Kerns	400 meters	1st	
Men's	1941 Outdoor	Leroy Weed	Mile run	2nd	
Men's	1941 Outdoor	John Wilson	High jump	2nd	
Men's	1941 Outdoor	Gil Lacava	High jump	4th	
Men's	1941 Outdoor	Byron Dudley	Pole vault	3rd	
Men's	1941 Outdoor	Bill Schaefer	Pole vault	3rd	
Men's	1941 Outdoor	Mel Bleeker	Long jump	3rd	
Men's	1941 Outdoor	Kenneth Wren	Long jump	6th	
Men's	1941 Outdoor	Carl Merritt	Shot put	3rd	
Men's	1941 Outdoor	Bob Peoples	Javelin throw	2nd	
Men's	1942 Outdoor	Dick Browning	220 yards hurdles	3rd	
Men's	1942 Outdoor	Walter Smith	220 yards hurdles	6th	
Men's	1942 Outdoor	Dick Browning	100 meters	6th	
Men's	1942 Outdoor	John Biewener	110 meters hurdles	5th	
Men's	1942 Outdoor	Cliff Bourland	200 meters	3rd	
Men's	1942 Outdoor	Jack Trout	200 meters	6th	
Men's	1942 Outdoor	Cliff Bourland	400 meters	1st	
Men's	1942 Outdoor	John Wachtier	400 meters	2nd	
Men's	1942 Outdoor	Hubie Kerns	400 meters	6th	
Men's	1942 Outdoor	Leroy Weed	Mile run	2nd	
Men's	1942 Outdoor	Gil Lacava	High jump	2nd	
Men's	1942 Outdoor	Searles Tally	High jump	2nd	
Men's	1942 Outdoor	Bill Schaefer	Pole vault	2nd	
Men's	1942 Outdoor	Mel Bleeker	Long jump	2nd	
Men's	1942 Outdoor	Kenneth Wren	Long jump	5th	
Men's	1942 Outdoor	Carl Merritt	Shot put	2nd	
Men's	1942 Outdoor	Wilbur Thompson	Shot put	5th	
Men's	1943 Outdoor	Jack Trout	200 meters	2nd	
Men's	1943 Outdoor	Cliff Bourland	200 meters	3rd	
Men's	1943 Outdoor	Cliff Bourland	400 meters	1st	
Men's	1943 Outdoor	Edsel Curry	Long jump	2nd	
Men's	1943 Outdoor	Bruce Miller	Javelin throw	3rd	
Men's	1946 Outdoor	Al Lawrence	220 yards hurdles	3rd	
Men's	1946 Outdoor	John Wachtier	400 meters	4th	
Men's	1946 Outdoor	Roland Sink	Mile run	4th	
Men's	1946 Outdoor	Bill Wakefield	High jump	5th	
Men's	1946 Outdoor	Bob Hart	Pole vault	2nd	
Men's	1946 Outdoor	Fred Winter	Pole vault	4th	
Men's	1946 Outdoor	Al Lawrence	Long jump	3rd	
Men's	1946 Outdoor	Wilbur Thompson	Shot put	2nd	
Men's	1946 Outdoor	Sylvester Heinberg	Discus throw	4th	
Men's	1947 Outdoor	Ron Frazier	220 yards hurdles	3rd	
Men's	1947 Outdoor	Al Lawrence	220 yards hurdles	>6th	
Men's	1947 Outdoor	Mel Patton	100 meters	1st	
Men's	1947 Outdoor	Wells Deloach	400 meters	4th	
Men's	1947 Outdoor	Roland Sink	3000 meters	3rd	
Men's	1947 Outdoor	Bob Hart	Pole vault	1st	
Men's	1947 Outdoor	Al Lawrence	Long jump	5th	
Men's	1947 Outdoor	Bill Bayless	Shot put	6th	
Men's	1948 Outdoor	Mel Patton	100 meters	1st	
Men's	1948 Outdoor	Mel Patton	200 meters	1st	
Men's	1948 Outdoor	Ron Frazier	400 meters hurdles	3rd	
Men's	1948 Outdoor	Bob Chambers	800 meters	3rd	
Men's	1948 Outdoor	Roland Sink	1500 meters	3rd	
Men's	1948 Outdoor	Bob Hart	Pole vault	4th	
Men's	1948 Outdoor	John Montgomery	Pole vault	4th	
Men's	1948 Outdoor	Bill Bayless	Shot put	7th	
Men's	1949 Outdoor	Ron Frazier	220 yards hurdles	3rd	
Men's	1949 Outdoor	Mel Patton	100 meters	1st	
Men's	1949 Outdoor	Dick Attlesey	110 meters hurdles	2nd	
Men's	1949 Outdoor	Mel Patton	200 meters	1st	
Men's	1949 Outdoor	George Pasquali	200 meters	8th	
Men's	1949 Outdoor	Wells Deloach	400 meters	4th	
Men's	1949 Outdoor	Bob Pruitt	800 meters	3rd	
Men's	1949 Outdoor	Jack Barnes	High jump	4th	
Men's	1949 Outdoor	John Montgomery	Pole vault	4th	
Men's	1949 Outdoor	Henry Aihara	Long jump	3rd	
Men's	1949 Outdoor	Al Lawrence	Long jump	8th	
Men's	1949 Outdoor	Bill Bayless	Shot put	5th	
Men's	1949 Outdoor	Jess Swope	Shot put	6th	
Men's	1950 Outdoor	Dick Attlesey	220 yards hurdles	2nd	
Men's	1950 Outdoor	Art Barnard	220 yards hurdles	8th	
Men's	1950 Outdoor	Al Mejia	100 meters	8th	
Men's	1950 Outdoor	Dick Attlesey	110 meters hurdles	1st	
Men's	1950 Outdoor	Art Barnard	110 meters hurdles	4th	
Men's	1950 Outdoor	Don Halderman	110 meters hurdles	8th	
Men's	1950 Outdoor	Bob Pruitt	800 meters	7th	
Men's	1950 Outdoor	Wally Wilson	Mile run	5th	
Men's	1950 Outdoor	Jim Newcomb	3000 meters	2nd	
Men's	1950 Outdoor	Jack Rowan	Pole vault	5th	
Men's	1950 Outdoor	Walt Jensen	Pole vault	5th	
Men's	1950 Outdoor	Henry Aihara	Long jump	2nd	
Men's	1950 Outdoor	Sim Iness	Discus throw	2nd	
Men's	1951 Outdoor	Jack Davis	220 yards hurdles	3rd	
Men's	1951 Outdoor	Art Barnard	220 yards hurdles	8th	
Men's	1951 Outdoor	Jack Davis	110 meters hurdles	1st	
Men's	1951 Outdoor	Art Barnard	110 meters hurdles	3rd	
Men's	1951 Outdoor	John Bradley	400 meters	4th	
Men's	1951 Outdoor	Jim Newcomb	3000 meters	8th	
Men's	1951 Outdoor	Jack Rowan	Pole vault	2nd	
Men's	1951 Outdoor	Walt Jensen	Pole vault	2nd	
Men's	1951 Outdoor	Frank Flores	Long jump	3rd	
Men's	1951 Outdoor	Verle Sorgen	Long jump	6th	
Men's	1951 Outdoor	Parry O'Brien	Shot put	2nd	
Men's	1951 Outdoor	Jess Swope	Shot put	4th	
Men's	1951 Outdoor	Larry Goins	Javelin throw	6th	
Men's	1952 Outdoor	Jack Davis	110 meters hurdles	1st	
Men's	1952 Outdoor	Willard Wright	110 meters hurdles	5th	
Men's	1952 Outdoor	Jack Davis	200 meters	2nd	
Men's	1952 Outdoor	Jim Lea	400 meters	3rd	
Men's	1952 Outdoor	Art Garcia	5000 meters	7th	
Men's	1952 Outdoor	Manuel Ronquillo	High jump	4th	
Men's	1952 Outdoor	Leroy Cox	Pole vault	6th	
Men's	1952 Outdoor	Frank Flores	Long jump	5th	
Men's	1952 Outdoor	Frank Flores	Triple jump	2nd	
Men's	1952 Outdoor	Parry O'Brien	Shot put	1st	
Men's	1952 Outdoor	Sim Iness	Discus throw	1st	
Men's	1952 Outdoor	Parry O'Brien	Discus throw	2nd	
Men's	1952 Outdoor	Des Koch	Discus throw	7th	
Men's	1951 Outdoor	Jack Davis	220 yards hurdles	1st	
Men's	1953 Outdoor	Jack Davis	110 meters hurdles	1st	
Men's	1953 Outdoor	Jim Lea	400 meters	1st	
Men's	1953 Outdoor	Verle Sorgen	400 meters	3rd	
Men's	1953 Outdoor	Ernie Shelton	High jump	4th	
Men's	1953 Outdoor	Manuel Ronquillo	High jump	5th	
Men's	1953 Outdoor	Parry O'Brien	Shot put	1st	
Men's	1953 Outdoor	Sim Iness	Discus throw	1st	
Men's	1953 Outdoor	Parry O'Brien	Discus throw	2nd	
Men's	1953 Outdoor	Dick Genther	Javelin throw	1st	
Men's	1954 Outdoor	Joe Graffio	100 meters	2nd	
Men's	1954 Outdoor	Willard Wright	110 meters hurdles	2nd	
Men's	1954 Outdoor	Rod Wilger	200 meters	3rd	
Men's	1954 Outdoor	Jim Lea	400 meters	1st	
Men's	1954 Outdoor	Mike Larrabee	400 meters	5th	
Men's	1954 Outdoor	Ernie Shelton	High jump	1st	
Men's	1954 Outdoor	Walt Levack	Pole vault	5th	
Men's	1954 Outdoor	Jon Arnett	Long jump	2nd	
Men's	1954 Outdoor	Des Koch	Discus throw	2nd	
Men's	1954 Outdoor	Leon Patterson	Discus throw	3rd	
Men's	1955 Outdoor	Leon Clarke	220 yards hurdles	3rd	
Men's	1955 Outdoor	Sid Wing	Mile run	5th	
Men's	1955 Outdoor	Fernando Ledesman	3000 meters	7th	
Men's	1955 Outdoor	Ernie Shleton	High jump	1st	
Men's	1955 Outdoor	Ron Morris	Pole vault	2nd	
Men's	1955 Outdoor	Walt Levack	Pole vault	2nd	
Men's	1955 Outdoor	Leroy Cox	Pole vault	8th	
Men's	1955 Outdoor	Ray Martin	Shot put	4th	
Men's	1955 Outdoor	Des Koch	Discus throw	1st	
Men's	1956 Outdoor	Pat Coyle	100 meters	8th	
Men's	1956 Outdoor	Mike Larrabee	400 meters	7th	
Men's	1956 Outdoor	Murray Coburn	800 meters	7th	
Men's	1956 Outdoor	Sid Wing	1500 meters	3rd	
Men's	1956 Outdoor	Max Truex	5000 meters	4th	
Men's	1956 Outdoor	Walt Levack	Pole vault	3rd	
Men's	1956 Outdoor	Ron Morris	Pole vault	5th	
Men's	1956 Outdoor	Jack Findley	Triple jump	4th	
Men's	1956 Outdoor	Rink Babka	Discus throw	3rd	
Men's	1956 Outdoor	Doug Maijala	Javelin throw	2nd	
Men's	1958 Outdoor	Bob Lawson	110 meters hurdles	4th	
Men's	1958 Outdoor	Max Truex	3000 meters	3rd	
Men's	1958 Outdoor	Charlie Dumas	High jump	2nd	
Men's	1958 Outdoor	Gene Freudenthal	Pole vault	1st	
Men's	1958 Outdoor	Jerry Hren	Pole vault	5th	
Men's	1958 Outdoor	Ernie Bullard	Pole vault	5th	
Men's	1958 Outdoor	Bob Lawson	Long jump	7th	
Men's	1958 Outdoor	Dave Davis	Shot put	1st	
Men's	1958 Outdoor	Rink Babka	Discus throw	1st	
Men's	1958 Outdoor	Jack Egan	Discus throw	4th	
Men's	1958 Outdoor	Mike Page	Javelin throw	6th	
Men's	1960 Outdoor	Charlie Dumas	High jump	3rd	
Men's	1960 Outdoor	Bob Avant	High jump	7th	
Men's	1960 Outdoor	Jim Brewer	Pole vault	2nd	
Men's	1960 Outdoor	Luther Hayes	Triple jump	1st	
Men's	1960 Outdoor	Dallas Long	Shot put	1st	
Men's	1960 Outdoor	Jim Wade	Discus throw	2nd	
Men's	1960 Outdoor	Bob Sbordone	Javelin throw	6th	
Men's	1961 Outdoor	Bob Pierce	110 meters hurdles	2nd	
Men's	1961 Outdoor	Bobby Staten	400 meters hurdles	2nd	
Men's	1961 Outdoor	Bob Avant	High jump	2nd	
Men's	1961 Outdoor	Jim Brewer	Pole vault	1st	
Men's	1961 Outdoor	Luther Hayes	Long jump	2nd	
Men's	1961 Outdoor	Luther Hayes	Triple jump	1st	
Men's	1961 Outdoor	Bill Jackson	Triple jump	6th	
Men's	1961 Outdoor	Dallas Long	Shot put	1st	
Men's	1961 Outdoor	Bob Sbordone	Javelin throw	4th	
Men's	1962 Outdoor	Brian Polkinghorne	110 meters hurdles	3rd	
Men's	1962 Outdoor	Rex Cawley	400 meters	6th	
Men's	1962 Outdoor	Mel Hein Jr.	Pole vault	5th	
Men's	1962 Outdoor	Dallas Long	Shot put	1st	
Men's	1962 Outdoor	Jan Sikorsky	Javelin throw	1st	
Men's	1963 Outdoor	Dave Morris	100 meters	5th	
Men's	1963 Outdoor	Brian Polkinghorne	110 meters hurdles	3rd	
Men's	1963 Outdoor	Rex Cawley	400 meters	2nd	
Men's	1963 Outdoor	Rex Cawley	400 meters hurdles	1st	
Men's	1963 Outdoor	Julio Marín	3000 meters steeplechase	4th	
Men's	1963 Outdoor	Julio Marín	5000 meters	1st	
Men's	1963 Outdoor	Julio Marín	10,000 meters	1st	
Men's	1963 Outdoor	Lew Hoyt	High jump	1st	
Men's	1963 Outdoor	George Fleckenstein	High jump	7th	
Men's	1963 Outdoor	Mel Hein Jr.	Pole vault	6th	
Men's	1963 Outdoor	Mike Flanagan	Pole vault	7th	
Men's	1964 Outdoor	Theo Viltz	110 meters hurdles	4th	
Men's	1964 Outdoor	Bruce Bess	800 meters	3rd	
Men's	1964 Outdoor	Wellesley Clayton	4 × 100 meters relay	3rd	
Men's	1964 Outdoor	Dick Cortese	4 × 100 meters relay	3rd	
Men's	1964 Outdoor	Gary Comer	4 × 100 meters relay	3rd	
Men's	1964 Outdoor	Dave Morris	4 × 100 meters relay	3rd	
Men's	1964 Outdoor	Mike Flanagan	Pole vault	2nd	
Men's	1964 Outdoor	Wellesley Clayton	Long jump	4th	
Men's	1964 Outdoor	Don Castle	Shot put	5th	
Men's	1964 Outdoor	Dennis Wynn	Shot put	8th	
Men's	1964 Outdoor	Larry Stuart	Javelin throw	7th	
Men's	1965 Indoor	Dennis Carr	1000 meters	4th	
Men's	1965 Indoor	Chris Johnson	Mile run	1st	
Men's	1965 Indoor	Bill Fosdick	Pole vault	4th	
Men's	1965 Outdoor	Paul Kerry	110 meters hurdles	1st	
Men's	1965 Outdoor	Theo Viltz	110 meters hurdles	3rd	
Men's	1965 Outdoor	Lew Hoyt	High jump	7th	
Men's	1965 Outdoor	Bill Fosdick	Pole vault	1st	
Men's	1965 Outdoor	Wellesley Clayton	Long jump	4th	
Men's	1965 Outdoor	Jeff Smith	Shot put	7th	
Men's	1965 Outdoor	Gary Carlsen	Discus throw	5th	
Men's	1966 Indoor	Paul Kerry	55 meters hurdles	3rd	
Men's	1966 Indoor	John Link	Mile run	4th	
Men's	1966 Indoor	Roger Wolff	4 × 800 meters relay	4th	
Men's	1966 Indoor	Bruce Bess	4 × 800 meters relay	4th	
Men's	1966 Indoor	Dave Buck	4 × 800 meters relay	4th	
Men's	1966 Indoor	Dennis Carr	4 × 800 meters relay	4th	
Men's	1966 Indoor	Greg Heet	High jump	5th	
Men's	1966 Indoor	Bill Fosdick	Pole vault	1st	
Men's	1966 Outdoor	Dwight Middleton	400 meters	1st	
Men's	1966 Outdoor	Roger Wolff	400 meters	8th	
Men's	1966 Outdoor	John Link	Mile run	8th	
Men's	1966 Outdoor	Dennis Carr	4 × 400 meters relay	3rd	
Men's	1966 Outdoor	Dave Buck	4 × 400 meters relay	3rd	
Men's	1966 Outdoor	Roger Wolff	4 × 400 meters relay	3rd	
Men's	1966 Outdoor	Dwight Middleton	4 × 400 meters relay	3rd	
Men's	1966 Outdoor	Greg Heet	High jump	3rd	
Men's	1966 Outdoor	Bill Fosdick	Pole vault	8th	
Men's	1966 Outdoor	Gary Carlsen	Discus throw	2nd	
Men's	1967 Indoor	Lennox Miller	55 meters	4th	
Men's	1967 Indoor	O.J. Simpson	55 meters	5th	
Men's	1967 Indoor	Earl McCullouch	55 meters hurdles	1st	
Men's	1967 Indoor	Richard Joyce	4 × 800 meters relay	1st	
Men's	1967 Indoor	Dave Buck	4 × 800 meters relay	1st	
Men's	1967 Indoor	Dennis Carr	4 × 800 meters relay	1st	
Men's	1967 Indoor	Carl Trentadue	4 × 800 meters relay	1st	
Men's	1967 Indoor	Craig Grant	Distance medley relay	3rd	
Men's	1967 Indoor	Roger Wolff	Distance medley relay	3rd	
Men's	1967 Indoor	Dennis Carr	Distance medley relay	3rd	
Men's	1967 Indoor	John Link	Distance medley relay	3rd	
Men's	1967 Indoor	Bob Seagren	Pole vault	1st	
Men's	1967 Indoor	Paul Wilson	Pole vault	2nd	
Men's	1967 Indoor	Bill Fosdick	Pole vault	5th	
Men's	1967 Outdoor	Lennox Miller	100 meters	2nd	
Men's	1967 Outdoor	Fred Kuller	100 meters	4th	
Men's	1967 Outdoor	O.J. Simpson	100 meters	6th	
Men's	1967 Outdoor	Earl McCullouch	110 meters hurdles	1st	
Men's	1967 Outdoor	Paul Kerry	110 meters hurdles	6th	
Men's	1967 Outdoor	Lennox Miller	200 meters	2nd	
Men's	1967 Outdoor	Fred Kuller	200 meters	8th	
Men's	1967 Outdoor	Geoff Vanderstock	400 meters hurdles	3rd	
Men's	1967 Outdoor	Dennis Carr	800 meters	2nd	
Men's	1967 Outdoor	Dave Buck	800 meters	6th	
Men's	1967 Outdoor	Earl McCullouch	4 × 100 meters relay	1st	
Men's	1967 Outdoor	Fred Kuller	4 × 100 meters relay	1st	
Men's	1967 Outdoor	O.J. Simpson	4 × 100 meters relay	1st	
Men's	1967 Outdoor	Lennox Miller	4 × 100 meters relay	1st	
Men's	1967 Outdoor	Roger Wolf	4 × 400 meters relay	6th	
Men's	1967 Outdoor	Geoff Vanderstock	4 × 400 meters relay	6th	
Men's	1967 Outdoor	Richard Joyce	4 × 400 meters relay	6th	
Men's	1967 Outdoor	Dave Buck	4 × 400 meters relay	6th	
Men's	1967 Outdoor	Bob Seagren	Pole vault	1st	
Men's	1967 Outdoor	Paul Wilson	Pole vault	2nd	
Men's	1967 Outdoor	Gary Carlsen	Discus throw	2nd	
Men's	1968 Indoor	Lennox Miller	55 meters	3rd	
Men's	1968 Indoor	O.J. Simpson	55 meters	5th	
Men's	1968 Indoor	Earl McCullouch	55 meters hurdles	2nd	
Men's	1968 Indoor	Carl Trentadue	800 meters	4th	
Men's	1968 Indoor	Ole Oleson	3000 meters	4th	
Men's	1968 Indoor	Craig Grant	Distance medley relay	4th	
Men's	1968 Indoor	Geoff Vanderstock	Distance medley relay	4th	
Men's	1968 Indoor	Ole Oleson	Distance medley relay	4th	
Men's	1968 Indoor	Carl Trentadue	Distance medley relay	4th	
Men's	1968 Indoor	Paul Wilson	Pole vault	1st	
Men's	1968 Indoor	Bob Seagren	Pole vault	4th	
Men's	1968 Indoor	Tim Barrett	Triple jump	5th	
Men's	1968 Indoor	Tom Colich	Shot put	4th	
Men's	1968 Outdoor	Lennox Miller	100 meters	1st	
Men's	1968 Outdoor	Earl McCullouch	110 meters hurdles	1st	
Men's	1968 Outdoor	Lennox Miller	200 meters	2nd	
Men's	1968 Outdoor	Fred Kuller	200 meters	8th	
Men's	1968 Outdoor	Geoff Vanderstock	400 meters hurdles	3rd	
Men's	1968 Outdoor	Earl McCullouch	4 × 100 meters relay	1st	
Men's	1968 Outdoor	Fred Kuller	4 × 100 meters relay	1st	
Men's	1968 Outdoor	O.J. Simpson	4 × 100 meters relay	1st	
Men's	1968 Outdoor	Lennox Miller	4 × 100 meters relay	1st	
Men's	1968 Outdoor	Max Lowe	High jump	8th	
Men's	1968 Outdoor	Bob Seagren	Pole vault	2nd	
Men's	1968 Outdoor	Tim Barrett	Triple jump	3rd	
Men's	1969 Indoor	Herman Franklin	55 meters hurdles	6th	
Men's	1969 Indoor	Carl Trentadue	800 meters	4th	
Men's	1969 Indoor	Ole Oleson	3000 meters	1st	
Men's	1969 Indoor	Howard Becker	Distance medley relay	2nd	
Men's	1969 Indoor	Monty Turner	Distance medley relay	2nd	
Men's	1969 Indoor	Carl Trentadue	Distance medley relay	2nd	
Men's	1969 Indoor	Ole Oleson	Distance medley relay	2nd	
Men's	1969 Indoor	Bob Seagren	Pole vault	2nd	
Men's	1969 Outdoor	Lennox Miller	100 meters	2nd	
Men's	1969 Outdoor	Herm Franklin	110 meters hurdles	8th	
Men's	1969 Outdoor	Edesel Garrison	400 meters	4th	
Men's	1969 Outdoor	Ole Oleson	5000 meters	1st	
Men's	1969 Outdoor	Bob Seagren	Pole vault	1st	
Men's	1969 Outdoor	Tom Colich	Shot put	6th	
Men's	1970 Outdoor	Edesel Garrison	400 meters	6th	
Men's	1970 Outdoor	Fred Ritcherson	10,000 meters	4th	
Men's	1970 Outdoor	Mike Jackson	4 × 100 meters relay	2nd	
Men's	1970 Outdoor	Monty Turner	4 × 100 meters relay	2nd	
Men's	1970 Outdoor	Ken Jones	4 × 100 meters relay	2nd	
Men's	1970 Outdoor	Edesel Garrison	4 × 100 meters relay	2nd	
Men's	1970 Outdoor	Dave Murphy	Shot put	2nd	
Men's	1970 Outdoor	Dave Murphy	Discus throw	6th	
Men's	1971 Indoor	Henry Hines	Long jump	1st	
Men's	1971 Indoor	Henry Jackson	Triple jump	4th	
Men's	1971 Outdoor	Leon Brown	100 meters	4th	
Men's	1971 Outdoor	Willie Deckard	100 meters	8th	
Men's	1971 Outdoor	Lance Babb	110 meters hurdles	5th	
Men's	1971 Outdoor	Edesel Garrison	400 meters	2nd	
Men's	1971 Outdoor	Lance Babb	4 × 100 meters relay	1st	
Men's	1971 Outdoor	Edesel Garrison	4 × 100 meters relay	1st	
Men's	1971 Outdoor	Leon Brown	4 × 100 meters relay	1st	
Men's	1971 Outdoor	Willie Deckard	4 × 100 meters relay	1st	
Men's	1971 Outdoor	Larry Hollins	High jump	2nd	
Men's	1971 Outdoor	Henry Hines	Long jump	2nd	
Men's	1971 Outdoor	Henry Jackson	Triple jump	7th	
Men's	1971 Outdoor	Doug Lane	Shot put	5th	
Men's	1971 Outdoor	Joe Antunovich	Discus throw	6th	
Men's	1972 Indoor	Lance Babb	55 meters hurdles	4th	
Men's	1972 Indoor	Jerry Wilson	55 meters hurdles	5th	
Men's	1972 Indoor	Henry Hines	Long jump	1st	
Men's	1972 Indoor	Henry Jackson	Triple jump	2nd	
Men's	1972 Indoor	Doug Lane	Shot put	1st	
Men's	1972 Indoor	Frank Bredice	Weight throw	3rd	
Men's	1972 Outdoor	Jerry Wilson	110 meters hurdles	1st	
Men's	1972 Outdoor	Leon Brown	200 meters	4th	
Men's	1972 Outdoor	Willie Deckard	200 meters	5th	
Men's	1972 Outdoor	Edesel Garrison	400 meters	4th	
Men's	1972 Outdoor	Earl Richardson	400 meters	8th	
Men's	1972 Outdoor	Randy Williams	4 × 100 meters relay	1st	
Men's	1972 Outdoor	Edesel Garrison	4 × 100 meters relay	1st	
Men's	1972 Outdoor	Leon Brown	4 × 100 meters relay	1st	
Men's	1972 Outdoor	Willie Deckard	4 × 100 meters relay	1st	
Men's	1972 Outdoor	Tony Krzyzosiak	4 × 400 meters relay	6th	
Men's	1972 Outdoor	Earl Richardson	4 × 400 meters relay	6th	
Men's	1972 Outdoor	Leon Brown	4 × 400 meters relay	6th	
Men's	1972 Outdoor	Edesel Garrison	4 × 400 meters relay	6th	
Men's	1972 Outdoor	Robert Pullard	Pole vault	7th	
Men's	1972 Outdoor	Randy Williams	Long jump	1st	
Men's	1972 Outdoor	Henry Jackson	Long jump	5th	
Men's	1972 Outdoor	Henry Jackson	Triple jump	7th	
Men's	1972 Outdoor	Doug Lane	Shot put	3rd	
Men's	1973 Indoor	Jerry Culp	High jump	3rd	
Men's	1973 Indoor	Randy Williams	Long jump	1st	
Men's	1973 Outdoor	Don Quarrie	100 meters	7th	
Men's	1973 Outdoor	Trevor Campbel	4 × 400 meters relay	6th	
Men's	1973 Outdoor	James Baxter	4 × 400 meters relay	6th	
Men's	1973 Outdoor	Claude Brown	4 × 400 meters relay	6th	
Men's	1973 Outdoor	Earl Richardson	4 × 400 meters relay	6th	
Men's	1973 Outdoor	Dean Owens	High jump	7th	
Men's	1973 Outdoor	Robert Pullard	Pole vault	4th	
Men's	1973 Outdoor	Randy Williams	Long jump	4th	
Men's	1974 Indoor	Bob Pullard	Pole vault	3rd	
Men's	1974 Outdoor	Randy Williams	4 × 100 meters relay	8th	
Men's	1974 Outdoor	Greg Jones	4 × 100 meters relay	8th	
Men's	1974 Outdoor	Ken Randle	4 × 100 meters relay	8th	
Men's	1974 Outdoor	Mike Shavers	4 × 100 meters relay	8th	
Men's	1974 Outdoor	Claude Brown	4 × 400 meters relay	4th	
Men's	1974 Outdoor	Greg Jones	4 × 400 meters relay	4th	
Men's	1974 Outdoor	Ken Randle	4 × 400 meters relay	4th	
Men's	1974 Outdoor	Trevor Campbell	4 × 400 meters relay	4th	
Men's	1974 Outdoor	Robert Pullard	Pole vault	5th	
Men's	1974 Outdoor	Randy Williams	Long jump	2nd	
Men's	1974 Outdoor	Bo Sterner	Decathlon	3rd	
Men's	1974 Outdoor	Bob Coffman	Decathlon	5th	
Men's	1975 Outdoor	Mike Johnson	110 meters hurdles	6th	
Men's	1975 Outdoor	James Gilkes	200 meters	2nd	
Men's	1975 Outdoor	Ken Randle	400 meters	4th	
Men's	1975 Outdoor	Tom Andrews	400 meters hurdles	7th	
Men's	1975 Outdoor	Randy Williams	4 × 100 meters relay	1st	
Men's	1975 Outdoor	Mike Simmons	4 × 100 meters relay	1st	
Men's	1975 Outdoor	Ken Randle	4 × 100 meters relay	1st	
Men's	1975 Outdoor	James Gilkes	4 × 100 meters relay	1st	
Men's	1975 Outdoor	Rod Connors	4 × 400 meters relay	4th	
Men's	1975 Outdoor	Mike Simmons	4 × 400 meters relay	4th	
Men's	1975 Outdoor	Tom Andrews	4 × 400 meters relay	4th	
Men's	1975 Outdoor	Trevor Campbell	4 × 400 meters relay	4th	
Men's	1975 Outdoor	Randy Williams	Long jump	4th	
Men's	1975 Outdoor	Gerald Hardeman	Long jump	6th	
Men's	1975 Outdoor	Tom Cochee	Triple jump	4th	
Men's	1975 Outdoor	Mike Budincich	Shot put	8th	
Men's	1975 Outdoor	Darrell Elder	Discus throw	6th	
Men's	1976 Outdoor	James Gilkes	100 meters	3rd	
Men's	1976 Outdoor	James Gilkes	200 meters	2nd	
Men's	1976 Outdoor	Ken Randle	400 meters	1st	
Men's	1976 Outdoor	Tom Andrews	400 meters hurdles	3rd	
Men's	1976 Outdoor	Rayfield Beaton	800 meters	5th	
Men's	1976 Outdoor	Mike Simmons	4 × 100 meters relay	3rd	
Men's	1976 Outdoor	Joel Andrews	4 × 100 meters relay	3rd	
Men's	1976 Outdoor	Ken Randle	4 × 100 meters relay	3rd	
Men's	1976 Outdoor	James Gilkes	4 × 100 meters relay	3rd	
Men's	1976 Outdoor	Rod Connors	4 × 400 meters relay	6th	
Men's	1976 Outdoor	Claude Brown	4 × 400 meters relay	6th	
Men's	1976 Outdoor	Trevor Campbell	4 × 400 meters relay	6th	
Men's	1976 Outdoor	Rayfield Beaton	4 × 400 meters relay	6th	
Men's	1976 Outdoor	Russ Rogers	Pole vault	3rd	
Men's	1976 Outdoor	Tom Distanislao	Pole vault	4th	
Men's	1976 Outdoor	Tom Cochee	Triple jump	2nd	
Men's	1976 Outdoor	Ralph Fruguglietti	Discus throw	2nd	
Men's	1976 Outdoor	Darrell Elder	Discus throw	6th	
Men's	1977 Outdoor	Mike Johnson	110 meters hurdles	7th	
Men's	1977 Outdoor	Clancy Edwards	200 meters	8th	
Men's	1977 Outdoor	Tom Andrews	400 meters hurdles	1st	
Men's	1977 Outdoor	Tom Andrews	4 × 100 meters relay	1st	
Men's	1977 Outdoor	Mike Simmons	4 × 100 meters relay	1st	
Men's	1977 Outdoor	Joel Andrews	4 × 100 meters relay	1st	
Men's	1977 Outdoor	Clancy Edwards	4 × 100 meters relay	1st	
Men's	1977 Outdoor	Joel Andrews	4 × 400 meters relay	1st	
Men's	1977 Outdoor	Lloyd Johnson	4 × 400 meters relay	1st	
Men's	1977 Outdoor	Rayfield Beaton	4 × 400 meters relay	1st	
Men's	1977 Outdoor	Tom Andrews	4 × 400 meters relay	1st	
Men's	1977 Outdoor	Larry Doubley	Long jump	1st	
Men's	1977 Outdoor	Ralph Fruguglietti	Discus throw	2nd	
Men's	1978 Outdoor	Clancy Edwards	100 meters	1st	
Men's	1978 Outdoor	Kevin Williams	100 meters	6th	
Men's	1978 Outdoor	Clancy Edwards	200 meters	1st	
Men's	1978 Outdoor	James Sanford	200 meters	3rd	
Men's	1978 Outdoor	Richard Graybehl	400 meters hurdles	2nd	
Men's	1978 Outdoor	Kevin Williams	4 × 100 meters relay	1st	
Men's	1978 Outdoor	Billy Mullins	4 × 100 meters relay	1st	
Men's	1978 Outdoor	Clancy Edwards	4 × 100 meters relay	1st	
Men's	1978 Outdoor	James Sanford	4 × 100 meters relay	1st	
Men's	1978 Outdoor	Richard Graybehl	4 × 400 meters relay	4th	(Note: Later revoked because Mullins was declared scholastically ineligible)
Men's	1978 Outdoor	Joel Andrews	4 × 400 meters relay	4th	(Note: Later revoked because Mullins was declared scholastically ineligible)
Men's	1978 Outdoor	Rayfield Beaton	4 × 400 meters relay	4th	(Note: Later revoked because Mullins was declared scholastically ineligible)
Men's	1978 Outdoor	Billy Mullins	4 × 400 meters relay	4th	(Note: Later revoked because Mullins was declared scholastically ineligible)
Men's	1979 Outdoor	James Sanford	100 meters	2nd	
Men's	1979 Outdoor	Colin Bradford	400 meters	7th	
Men's	1979 Outdoor	David Omwansa	800 meters	3rd	
Men's	1979 Outdoor	Kevin Williams	4 × 100 meters relay	1st	
Men's	1979 Outdoor	Colin Bradford	4 × 100 meters relay	1st	
Men's	1979 Outdoor	James Sanford	4 × 100 meters relay	1st	
Men's	1979 Outdoor	Billy Mullins	4 × 100 meters relay	1st	
Men's	1979 Outdoor	James Sanford	4 × 400 meters relay	6th	
Men's	1979 Outdoor	James Walters	4 × 400 meters relay	6th	
Men's	1979 Outdoor	Colin Bradford	4 × 400 meters relay	6th	
Men's	1979 Outdoor	Rod Bethany	4 × 400 meters relay	6th	
Men's	1979 Outdoor	Jerry Mulligan	Pole vault	6th	
Men's	1979 Outdoor	Kenny Hays	Triple jump	7th	
Men's	1980 Outdoor	James Sanford	100 meters	3rd	
Men's	1980 Outdoor	Tonie Campbell	110 meters hurdles	4th	
Men's	1980 Outdoor	James Sanford	200 meters	8th	
Men's	1980 Outdoor	Bill Green	400 meters	2nd	
Men's	1980 Outdoor	Kevin Williams	4 × 100 meters relay	1st	
Men's	1980 Outdoor	Mike Sanford	4 × 100 meters relay	1st	
Men's	1980 Outdoor	James Sanford	4 × 100 meters relay	1st	
Men's	1980 Outdoor	Bill Green	4 × 100 meters relay	1st	
Men's	1980 Outdoor	Larry Doubley	Long jump	2nd	
Men's	1982 Indoor	Tonie Campbell	55 meters hurdles	1st	
Men's	1982 Outdoor	Darwin Cook	100 meters	5th	
Men's	1982 Outdoor	Milan Stewart	110 meters hurdles	1st	
Men's	1982 Outdoor	Dave Kenworthy	Pole vault	1st	
Men's	1983 Indoor	Darwin Cook	55 meters	5th	
Men's	1983 Indoor	Milan Stewart	55 meters hurdles	2nd	
Men's	1983 Indoor	Dave Kenworthy	Pole vault	3rd	
Men's	1983 Indoor	Hank Kraychir	Shot put	5th	
Men's	1983 Outdoor	Darwin Cook	100 meters	7th	
Men's	1983 Outdoor	Mark Handelsman	800 meters	7th	
Men's	1983 Outdoor	Anthony Caire	High jump	8th	
Men's	1983 Outdoor	Dave Kenworthy	Pole vault	7th	
Men's	1983 Outdoor	Ed Tave	Long jump	4th	
Men's	1983 Outdoor	Hank Kraychir	Shot put	5th	
Women's	1983 Outdoor	Debra Larsen	High jump	7th	
Women's	1983 Outdoor	Cindy Johnson	Discus throw	7th	
Men's	1984 Outdoor	Ed Tave	Long jump	4th	
Men's	1984 Outdoor	Hank Kraychir	Shot put	7th	
Men's	1984 Outdoor	Mike Gonzales	Decathlon	3rd	
Women's	1984 Outdoor	Sabrina Williams	Long jump	4th	
Women's	1984 Outdoor	Sharon Hatfield	Heptathlon	4th	
Men's	1985 Indoor	Doug Wicks	Pole vault	2nd	
Women's	1985 Indoor	Yvette Bates	Triple jump	2nd	
Men's	1985 Outdoor	Darwin Cook	100 meters	6th	
Women's	1985 Outdoor	Wendy Brown	Long jump	4th	
Women's	1985 Outdoor	Sabrina Williams	Long jump	7th	
Women's	1985 Outdoor	Wendy Brown	Triple jump	4th	
Women's	1985 Outdoor	Diana Clements	Shot put	5th	
Men's	1986 Indoor	Luis Morales	55 meters	4th	
Women's	1986 Indoor	Gervaise McGraw	4 × 400 meters relay	3rd	
Women's	1986 Indoor	Leslie Maxie	4 × 400 meters relay	3rd	
Women's	1986 Indoor	LaWanda Cabell	4 × 400 meters relay	3rd	
Women's	1986 Indoor	Myra Mayberry	4 × 400 meters relay	3rd	
Women's	1986 Indoor	Yvette Bates	Long jump	4th	
Women's	1986 Indoor	Wendy Brown	Triple jump	1st	
Women's	1986 Indoor	Yvette Bates	Triple jump	3rd	
Men's	1986 Outdoor	Mike Dexter	200 meters	5th	
Men's	1986 Outdoor	Joey Bunch	800 meters	4th	
Men's	1986 Outdoor	Robert Reading	4 × 100 meters relay	3rd	
Men's	1986 Outdoor	Antonio Manning	4 × 100 meters relay	3rd	
Men's	1986 Outdoor	Mike Dexter	4 × 100 meters relay	3rd	
Men's	1986 Outdoor	Luis Morales	4 × 100 meters relay	3rd	
Men's	1986 Outdoor	Steve Klassen	Pole vault	4th	
Men's	1986 Outdoor	Bernd Kneissler	Discus throw	3rd	
Men's	1986 Outdoor	John Wolitarsky	Hammer throw	7th	
Women's	1986 Outdoor	Gervaise McCraw	400 meters	4th	
Women's	1986 Outdoor	Robin Simmons	4 × 100 meters relay	4th	
Women's	1986 Outdoor	Gervaise McCraw	4 × 100 meters relay	4th	
Women's	1986 Outdoor	LaWanda Cabell	4 × 100 meters relay	4th	
Women's	1986 Outdoor	Myra Mayberry	4 × 100 meters relay	4th	
Women's	1986 Outdoor	Wendy Brown	Long jump	4th	
Women's	1986 Outdoor	Yvette Bates	Long jump	6th	
Women's	1986 Outdoor	Yvette Bates	Triple jump	2nd	
Women's	1986 Outdoor	Wendy Brown	Triple jump	4th	
Women's	1986 Outdoor	Diana Clements	Shot put	3rd	
Men's	1987 Indoor	Eric White	Pole vault	3rd	
Men's	1987 Indoor	Tambi Wenj	Shot put	4th	
Women's	1987 Indoor	Yvette Bates	Long jump	7th	
Women's	1987 Indoor	Yvette Bates	Triple jump	1st	
Women's	1987 Indoor	Wendy Brown	Triple jump	2nd	
Women's	1987 Indoor	Diana Clements	Shot put	6th	
Men's	1987 Outdoor	Steve Klassen	Pole vault	6th	
Men's	1987 Outdoor	Eric White	Pole vault	8th	
Men's	1987 Outdoor	Andrew Tolputt	Hammer throw	6th	
Women's	1987 Outdoor	Gervaise McCraw	400 meters	8th	
Women's	1987 Outdoor	Leslie Maxie	400 meters hurdles	2nd	
Women's	1987 Outdoor	Robin Simmons	4 × 100 meters relay	5th	
Women's	1987 Outdoor	Gervaise McCraw	4 × 100 meters relay	5th	
Women's	1987 Outdoor	Michelle Taylor	4 × 100 meters relay	5th	
Women's	1987 Outdoor	Myra Mayberry	4 × 100 meters relay	5th	
Women's	1987 Outdoor	Myra Mayberry	4 × 400 meters relay	1st	
Women's	1987 Outdoor	Gervaise McCraw	4 × 400 meters relay	1st	
Women's	1987 Outdoor	Michelle Taylor	4 × 400 meters relay	1st	
Women's	1987 Outdoor	Leslie Maxie	4 × 400 meters relay	1st	
Women's	1987 Outdoor	Yvette Bates	Long jump	3rd	
Women's	1987 Outdoor	Yvette Bates	Triple jump	2nd	
Women's	1987 Outdoor	Wendy Brown	Triple jump	3rd	
Women's	1987 Outdoor	Diana Clements	Shot put	5th	
Women's	1987 Outdoor	Wendy Brown	Heptathlon	5th	
Women's	1988 Indoor	Michelle Taylor	400 meters	3rd	
Women's	1988 Indoor	Yvette Bates	Long jump	2nd	
Women's	1988 Indoor	Wendy Brown	Long jump	7th	
Women's	1988 Indoor	Yvette Bates	Triple jump	1st	
Women's	1988 Indoor	Wendy Brown	Triple jump	2nd	
Men's	1988 Outdoor	Robert Reading	110 meters hurdles	7th	
Men's	1988 Outdoor	George Porter	400 meters hurdles	5th	
Men's	1988 Outdoor	Ibrahim Okash	800 meters	6th	
Women's	1988 Outdoor	Michelle Taylor	400 meters	7th	
Women's	1988 Outdoor	Wendy Brown	Long jump	6th	
Women's	1988 Outdoor	Wendy Brown	Triple jump	2nd	
Women's	1988 Outdoor	Yvette Bates	Triple jump	3rd	
Women's	1988 Outdoor	Wendy Brown	Heptathlon	1st	
Men's	1989 Indoor	Robert Reading	55 meters hurdles	5th	
Women's	1989 Indoor	Michelle Taylor	400 meters	3rd	
Women's	1989 Indoor	Leslie Noll	800 meters	8th	
Men's	1989 Outdoor	Robert Reading	110 meters hurdles	1st	
Men's	1989 Outdoor	George Porter	400 meters hurdles	3rd	
Men's	1989 Outdoor	Ibrahim Okash	800 meters	4th	
Women's	1989 Outdoor	Michelle Taylor	400 meters	5th	
Women's	1989 Outdoor	Michelle Taylor	800 meters	2nd	
Women's	1989 Outdoor	Lesley Noll	800 meters	5th	
Women's	1989 Outdoor	Ashley Selman	Javelin throw	6th	
Women's	1990 Indoor	Michelle Taylor	800 meters	3rd	
Men's	1990 Outdoor	Mark Crear	110 meters hurdles	3rd	
Men's	1990 Outdoor	Travis Hannah	400 meters	6th	
Women's	1990 Outdoor	Ashley Selman	Javelin throw	1st	
Men's	1991 Outdoor	Quincy Watts	400 meters	2nd	
Women's	1991 Outdoor	Ashley Selman	Javelin throw	2nd	
Men's	1992 Outdoor	Jeff Laynes	100 meters	5th	
Men's	1992 Outdoor	Mark Crear	110 meters hurdles	1st	
Men's	1992 Outdoor	Quincy Watts	400 meters	1st	
Men's	1992 Outdoor	Travis Hannah	400 meters	4th	
Men's	1992 Outdoor	Curtis Conway	4 × 100 meters relay	5th	
Men's	1992 Outdoor	Jeff Laynes	4 × 100 meters relay	5th	
Men's	1992 Outdoor	Travis Hannah	4 × 100 meters relay	5th	
Men's	1992 Outdoor	Quincy Watts	4 × 100 meters relay	5th	
Men's	1992 Outdoor	Travis Hannah	4 × 400 meters relay	2nd	
Men's	1992 Outdoor	Curtis Conway	4 × 400 meters relay	2nd	
Men's	1992 Outdoor	Martin Cannady	4 × 400 meters relay	2nd	
Men's	1992 Outdoor	Quincy Watts	4 × 400 meters relay	2nd	
Women's	1992 Outdoor	Allison Franke	Discus throw	7th	
Women's	1992 Outdoor	Allison Franke	Javelin throw	7th	
Men's	1993 Outdoor	Jeff Laynes	100 meters	7th	
Men's	1993 Outdoor	Marcus Carter	400 meters hurdles	7th	
Men's	1993 Outdoor	Balazs Kiss	Hammer throw	1st	
Women's	1993 Outdoor	Chrissy Mills	High jump	7th	
Men's	1994 Outdoor	Jean-Paul Bruwier	400 meters hurdles	3rd	
Men's	1994 Outdoor	Pedro Rodrigues	400 meters hurdles	7th	
Men's	1994 Outdoor	Gary Kirchhoff	Discus throw	7th	
Men's	1994 Outdoor	Balazs Kiss	Hammer throw	1st	
Women's	1994 Outdoor	Inger Miller	100 meters	5th	
Women's	1994 Outdoor	Sau Ying Chan	100 meters hurdles	4th	
Men's	1995 Outdoor	Ed Hervey	200 meters	5th	
Men's	1995 Outdoor	Udeme Ekpenyong	400 meters	8th	
Men's	1995 Outdoor	Anthony Volsan	4 × 100 meters relay	4th	
Men's	1995 Outdoor	Ed Hervey	4 × 100 meters relay	4th	
Men's	1995 Outdoor	Udeme Ekpenyong	4 × 100 meters relay	4th	
Men's	1995 Outdoor	Bryan Krill	4 × 100 meters relay	4th	
Men's	1995 Outdoor	Udeme Ekpenyong	4 × 400 meters relay	5th	
Men's	1995 Outdoor	Ed Hervey	4 × 400 meters relay	5th	
Men's	1995 Outdoor	Pedro Rodrigues	4 × 400 meters relay	5th	
Men's	1995 Outdoor	Bryan Krill	4 × 400 meters relay	5th	
Men's	1995 Outdoor	Chad Danowsky	Discus throw	6th	
Men's	1995 Outdoor	Balazs Kiss	Hammer throw	1st	
Men's	1995 Outdoor	Nils Fearnley	Javelin throw	2nd	
Women's	1995 Outdoor	Sau Ying Chan	100 meters hurdles	4th	
Men's	1996 Outdoor	Kenny Alade'Fa	400 meters hurdles	8th	
Men's	1996 Outdoor	Balazs Kiss	Hammer throw	1st	
Men's	1996 Outdoor	Bengt Johansson	Hammer throw	2nd	
Women's	1996 Outdoor	Grazyna Penc	1500 meters	3rd	
Women's	1996 Outdoor	Emebet Shiferaw	3000 meters	2nd	
Women's	1996 Outdoor	Tai-Ne Gibson	4 × 100 meters relay	6th	
Women's	1996 Outdoor	Kanika Conwright	4 × 100 meters relay	6th	
Women's	1996 Outdoor	Esi Benyarku	4 × 100 meters relay	6th	
Women's	1996 Outdoor	Torri Edwards	4 × 100 meters relay	6th	
Women's	1996 Outdoor	Nicole Haynes	Heptathlon	2nd	
Men's	1997 Outdoor	Jason Shelton	100 meters	6th	
Men's	1997 Outdoor	William Erese	110 meters hurdles	6th	
Men's	1997 Outdoor	Jerome Davis	400 meters	3rd	
Men's	1997 Outdoor	Issac Turner	800 meters	8th	
Men's	1997 Outdoor	Jason Shelton	4 × 100 meters relay	6th	
Men's	1997 Outdoor	Marcus Holiwell	4 × 100 meters relay	6th	
Men's	1997 Outdoor	Tony Serpas	4 × 100 meters relay	6th	
Men's	1997 Outdoor	Jerome Davis	4 × 100 meters relay	6th	
Men's	1997 Outdoor	Ray Carter	4 × 400 meters relay	4th	
Men's	1997 Outdoor	Isaac Turner	4 × 400 meters relay	4th	
Men's	1997 Outdoor	Dion Joyner	4 × 400 meters relay	4th	
Men's	1997 Outdoor	Jerome Davis	4 × 400 meters relay	4th	
Men's	1997 Outdoor	Kedjeloba Mambo	Triple jump	6th	
Men's	1997 Outdoor	Bengt Johansson	Hammer throw	1st	
Women's	1997 Outdoor	Grazyna Penc	1500 meters	4th	
Women's	1997 Outdoor	Emebet Shiferaw	3000 meters	4th	
Women's	1997 Outdoor	Emelie Fardigh	High jump	5th	
Women's	1997 Outdoor	Pam Simpson	Long jump	6th	
Men's	1998 Outdoor	William Erese	110 meters hurdles	5th	
Men's	1998 Outdoor	Charles Lee	200 meters	4th	
Men's	1998 Outdoor	Jerome Davis	400 meters	1st	
Men's	1998 Outdoor	Bengt Johansson	Hammer throw	2nd	
Men's	1998 Outdoor	Daniel Haag	Decathlon	7th	
Women's	1998 Outdoor	Torri Edwards	100 meters	3rd	
Women's	1998 Outdoor	Torri Edwards	200 meters	6th	
Women's	1998 Outdoor	Natasha Danvers	400 meters hurdles	3rd	
Women's	1998 Outdoor	Brigita Langerholc	800 meters	3rd	
Women's	1998 Outdoor	Grazyna Penc	1500 meters	3rd	
Women's	1998 Outdoor	Anna Lopaciuch	1500 meters	5th	
Women's	1998 Outdoor	Natasha Danvers	4 × 400 meters relay	5th	
Women's	1998 Outdoor	Carla Estes	4 × 400 meters relay	5th	
Women's	1998 Outdoor	Brigita Langerholc	4 × 400 meters relay	5th	
Women's	1998 Outdoor	Malika Edmonson	4 × 400 meters relay	5th	
Men's	1999 Outdoor	William Erese	110 meters hurdles	7th	
Men's	1999 Outdoor	Charles Lee	200 meters	3rd	
Men's	1999 Outdoor	Jerome Davis	400 meters	3rd	
Men's	1999 Outdoor	Miguel Fletcher	4 × 100 meters relay	2nd	
Men's	1999 Outdoor	Sultan McCullough	4 × 100 meters relay	2nd	
Men's	1999 Outdoor	Charles Lee	4 × 100 meters relay	2nd	
Men's	1999 Outdoor	Jerome Davis	4 × 100 meters relay	2nd	
Men's	1999 Outdoor	Charles Lee	4 × 400 meters relay	7th	
Men's	1999 Outdoor	Vince Williams	4 × 400 meters relay	7th	
Men's	1999 Outdoor	Felix Sánchez	4 × 400 meters relay	7th	
Men's	1999 Outdoor	Jerome Davis	4 × 400 meters relay	7th	
Men's	1999 Outdoor	Dennis Kholev	Pole vault	7th	
Men's	1999 Outdoor	Norbert Horvath	Hammer throw	2nd	
Women's	1999 Outdoor	Angela Williams	100 meters	1st	
Women's	1999 Outdoor	Torri Edwards	100 meters	8th	
Women's	1999 Outdoor	Torri Edwards	200 meters	6th	
Women's	1999 Outdoor	Natasha Danvers	400 meters hurdles	4th	
Women's	1999 Outdoor	Brigita Langerholc	800 meters	3rd	
Women's	1999 Outdoor	Grazyna Penc	1500 meters	2nd	
Women's	1999 Outdoor	Angela Williams	4 × 100 meters relay	2nd	
Women's	1999 Outdoor	Torri Edwards	4 × 100 meters relay	2nd	
Women's	1999 Outdoor	Malika Edmonson	4 × 100 meters relay	2nd	
Women's	1999 Outdoor	Esi Benyarku	4 × 100 meters relay	2nd	
Women's	1999 Outdoor	Natasha Danvers	4 × 400 meters relay	2nd	
Women's	1999 Outdoor	Malika Edmonson	4 × 400 meters relay	2nd	
Women's	1999 Outdoor	Brigita Langerholc	4 × 400 meters relay	2nd	
Women's	1999 Outdoor	Kinshasa Davis	4 × 400 meters relay	2nd	
Women's	1999 Outdoor	Pam Simpson	Long jump	3rd	
Women's	1999 Outdoor	Jennifer Vail	Hammer throw	6th	
Men's	2000 Outdoor	Sultan McCullough	100 meters	8th	
Men's	2000 Outdoor	Félix Sánchez	400 meters hurdles	1st	
Men's	2000 Outdoor	Darrell Rideaux	4 × 100 meters relay	5th	
Men's	2000 Outdoor	Sultan McCullough	4 × 100 meters relay	5th	
Men's	2000 Outdoor	Vince Williams	4 × 100 meters relay	5th	
Men's	2000 Outdoor	Andre Ammons	4 × 100 meters relay	5th	
Men's	2000 Outdoor	LeRoy Jordan	4 × 400 meters relay	3rd	
Men's	2000 Outdoor	Andre Ammons	4 × 400 meters relay	3rd	
Men's	2000 Outdoor	Vince Williams	4 × 400 meters relay	3rd	
Men's	2000 Outdoor	Félix Sánchez	4 × 400 meters relay	3rd	
Men's	2000 Outdoor	Norbert Horvath	Hammer throw	5th	
Women's	2000 Outdoor	Angela Williams	100 meters	1st	
Women's	2000 Outdoor	Kinshasa Davis	200 meters	2nd	
Women's	2000 Outdoor	Natasha Danvers	400 meters hurdles	1st	
Women's	2000 Outdoor	Brigita Langerholc	800 meters	8th	
Women's	2000 Outdoor	Anna Lopaciuch	1500 meters	3rd	
Women's	2000 Outdoor	Angela Williams	4 × 100 meters relay	1st	
Women's	2000 Outdoor	Candace Young	4 × 100 meters relay	1st	
Women's	2000 Outdoor	Malika Edmonson	4 × 100 meters relay	1st	
Women's	2000 Outdoor	Kinshasa Davis	4 × 100 meters relay	1st	
Women's	2000 Outdoor	Natasha Danvers	4 × 400 meters relay	3rd	
Women's	2000 Outdoor	Malika Edmonson	4 × 400 meters relay	3rd	
Women's	2000 Outdoor	Kinshasa Davis	4 × 400 meters relay	3rd	
Women's	2000 Outdoor	Brigita Langerholc	4 × 400 meters relay	3rd	
Women's	2000 Outdoor	Jennifer Vail	Hammer throw	6th	
Men's	2001 Outdoor	Ryan Wilson	110 meters hurdles	3rd	
Men's	2001 Outdoor	Dennis Kholev	Pole vault	1st	
Men's	2001 Outdoor	Norbert Horvath	Hammer throw	3rd	
Women's	2001 Outdoor	Angela Williams	100 meters	1st	
Women's	2001 Outdoor	Kinshasa Davis	200 meters	3rd	
Women's	2001 Outdoor	Brigita Langerholc	800 meters	1st	
Women's	2001 Outdoor	Angela Williams	4 × 100 meters relay	2nd	
Women's	2001 Outdoor	Candace Young	4 × 100 meters relay	2nd	
Women's	2001 Outdoor	Natasha Neal	4 × 100 meters relay	2nd	
Women's	2001 Outdoor	Kinshasa Davis	4 × 100 meters relay	2nd	
Women's	2001 Outdoor	Natasha Neal	4 × 400 meters relay	7th	
Women's	2001 Outdoor	Carla Estes	4 × 400 meters relay	7th	
Women's	2001 Outdoor	Kinshasa Davis	4 × 400 meters relay	7th	
Women's	2001 Outdoor	Brigitta Langerholc	4 × 400 meters relay	7th	
Women's	2001 Outdoor	Tatyana Obukhova	Triple jump	3rd	
Women's	2001 Outdoor	Cynthia Ademliuyi	Shot put	3rd	
Women's	2001 Outdoor	Julianna Tudja	Hammer throw	3rd	
Women's	2001 Outdoor	Inga Stasiulionyte	Javelin throw	1st	
Women's	2002 Indoor	Angela Williams	60 meters	1st	
Men's	2002 Outdoor	Ryan Wilson	110 meters hurdles	6th	
Men's	2002 Outdoor	Darrell Rideaux	4 × 100 meters relay	5th	
Men's	2002 Outdoor	Sultan McCullough	4 × 100 meters relay	5th	
Men's	2002 Outdoor	Wes Felix	4 × 100 meters relay	5th	
Men's	2002 Outdoor	Kareem Kelly	4 × 100 meters relay	5th	
Men's	2002 Outdoor	David Jaworski	High jump	2nd	
Men's	2002 Outdoor	Julien Kapek	Triple jump	3rd	
Women's	2002 Outdoor	Angela Williams	100 meters	1st	
Women's	2002 Outdoor	Nathasha Mayers	100 meters	2nd	
Women's	2002 Outdoor	Natasha Neal	100 meters hurdles	6th	
Women's	2002 Outdoor	Natasha Mayers	200 meters	1st	
Women's	2002 Outdoor	Kinshasa Davis	200 meters	8th	
Women's	2002 Outdoor	Aleksandra Deren	800 meters	7th	
Women's	2002 Outdoor	Angela Williams	4 × 100 meters relay	3rd	
Women's	2002 Outdoor	Disia Page	4 × 100 meters relay	3rd	
Women's	2002 Outdoor	Natasha Neal	4 × 100 meters relay	3rd	
Women's	2002 Outdoor	Kinshasa Davis	4 × 100 meters relay	3rd	
Women's	2002 Outdoor	Natasha Neal	4 × 400 meters relay	8th	
Women's	2002 Outdoor	Kinshasha Davis	4 × 400 meters relay	8th	
Women's	2002 Outdoor	Nakiya Johnson	4 × 400 meters relay	8th	
Women's	2002 Outdoor	Aleksandra Pieluzek	4 × 400 meters relay	8th	
Women's	2002 Outdoor	Tatyana Obukhova	Triple jump	4th	
Women's	2002 Outdoor	L'Orangerie Crawford	Hammer throw	6th	
Women's	2002 Outdoor	Inga Stasiulionyte	Javelin throw	2nd	
Men's	2003 Indoor	Allen Simms	Triple jump	1st	
Men's	2003 Indoor	Julien Kapek	Triple jump	4th	
Men's	2003 Outdoor	Ryan Wilson	110 meters hurdles	1st	
Men's	2003 Outdoor	David Jaworski	High jump	1st	
Men's	2003 Outdoor	Jesse Williams	High jump	7th	
Men's	2003 Outdoor	Jeff Ryan	Pole vault	5th	
Men's	2003 Outdoor	Allen Sims	Long jump	7th	
Men's	2003 Outdoor	Julien Kapek	Triple jump	1st	
Men's	2003 Outdoor	Allen Simms	Triple jump	3rd	
Women's	2003 Outdoor	Ginnie Powell	100 meters hurdles	6th	
Women's	2003 Outdoor	Julianna Tudja	Hammer throw	2nd	
Women's	2003 Outdoor	Inga Stasiulionyte	Javelin throw	2nd	
Men's	2004 Indoor	Jesse Williams	High jump	7th	
Men's	2004 Outdoor	Michael Murray	Hammer throw	8th	
Women's	2004 Outdoor	Iryna Vashchuk	1500 meters	6th	
Women's	2004 Outdoor	Julia Budniak	3000 meters steeplechase	6th	
Women's	2004 Outdoor	L'Orangerie Crawford	Shot put	5th	
Women's	2004 Outdoor	Inga Stasiulionyte	Javelin throw	2nd	
Men's	2005 Indoor	Jesse Williams	High jump	1st	
Women's	2005 Indoor	Virginia Powell	60 meters hurdles	1st	
Men's	2005 Outdoor	Wes Felix	100 meters	2nd	
Men's	2005 Outdoor	Garry Jones	4 × 100 meters relay	5th	
Men's	2005 Outdoor	Wes Felix	4 × 100 meters relay	5th	
Men's	2005 Outdoor	Phillip Frances	4 × 100 meters relay	5th	
Men's	2005 Outdoor	Jeff Garrison	4 × 100 meters relay	5th	
Men's	2005 Outdoor	Jesse Williams	High jump	1st	
Men's	2005 Outdoor	Allen Simms	Triple jump	2nd	
Men's	2005 Outdoor	Adam Midles	Hammer throw	6th	
Women's	2005 Outdoor	Alexis Weatherspoon	100 meters	3rd	
Women's	2005 Outdoor	Ginnie Powell	100 meters hurdles	1st	
Women's	2005 Outdoor	Candice Davis	100 meters hurdles	7th	
Women's	2005 Outdoor	Alexis Weatherspoon	200 meters	4th	
Women's	2005 Outdoor	Iryna Vashchuk	1500 meters	7th	
Men's	2006 Indoor	Jesse Williams	High jump	1st	
Women's	2006 Indoor	Ginnie Powell	60 meters	7th	
Women's	2006 Indoor	Virginia Powell	60 meters hurdles	1st	
Women's	2006 Indoor	Candice Davis	60 meters hurdles	8th	
Women's	2006 Indoor	Carol Rodríguez	200 meters	2nd	
Men's	2006 Outdoor	Lionel Larry	400 meters	6th	
Men's	2006 Outdoor	Duane Solomon	800 meters	5th	
Men's	2006 Outdoor	Kareem Kelly	4 × 400 meters relay	4th	
Men's	2006 Outdoor	Jeff Garrison	4 × 400 meters relay	4th	
Men's	2006 Outdoor	DeSean Cunningham	4 × 400 meters relay	4th	
Men's	2006 Outdoor	Lionel Larry	4 × 400 meters relay	4th	
Men's	2006 Outdoor	Jesse Williams	High jump	1st	
Men's	2006 Outdoor	Noah Bryant	Shot put	7th	
Men's	2006 Outdoor	Adam Midles	Hammer throw	7th	
Women's	2006 Outdoor	Carol Rodríguez	100 meters	3rd	
Women's	2006 Outdoor	Ginnie Powell	100 meters hurdles	1st	
Women's	2006 Outdoor	Carol Rodríguez	200 meters	4th	
Women's	2006 Outdoor	Ginnie Powell	4 × 100 meters relay	3rd	
Women's	2006 Outdoor	Jessica Onyepunuka	4 × 100 meters relay	3rd	
Women's	2006 Outdoor	Candice Davis	4 × 100 meters relay	3rd	
Women's	2006 Outdoor	Carol Rodríguez	4 × 100 meters relay	3rd	
Women's	2006 Outdoor	Brysun Stately	Pole vault	6th	
Women's	2006 Outdoor	Karen Freberg	Shot put	7th	
Women's	2006 Outdoor	Eva Orban	Hammer throw	2nd	
Men's	2007 Indoor	Noah Bryant	Shot put	1st	
Women's	2007 Indoor	Candice Davis	60 meters hurdles	4th	
Men's	2007 Outdoor	Kai Kelley	110 meters hurdles	7th	
Men's	2007 Outdoor	Ahmad Rashad	200 meters	8th	
Men's	2007 Outdoor	Lionel Larry	400 meters	2nd	
Men's	2007 Outdoor	Duane Solomon	800 meters	7th	
Men's	2007 Outdoor	Noah Bryant	Shot put	1st	
Men's	2007 Outdoor	Adam Midles	Hammer throw	5th	
Women's	2007 Outdoor	Carol Rodríguez	100 meters	4th	
Women's	2007 Outdoor	Jessica Onyepunuka	100 meters	7th	
Women's	2007 Outdoor	Candice Davis	100 meters hurdles	2nd	
Women's	2007 Outdoor	Jessica Onyepunuka	4 × 100 meters relay	3rd	
Women's	2007 Outdoor	Candice Davis	4 × 100 meters relay	3rd	
Women's	2007 Outdoor	Shalina Clarke	4 × 100 meters relay	3rd	
Women's	2007 Outdoor	Carol Rodríguez	4 × 100 meters relay	3rd	
Women's	2007 Outdoor	Eva Orban	Hammer throw	3rd	
Men's	2008 Outdoor	Kai Kelley	110 meters hurdles	6th	
Men's	2008 Outdoor	Lionel Larry	400 meters	2nd	
Men's	2008 Outdoor	Kai Kelley	400 meters hurdles	7th	
Men's	2008 Outdoor	Duane Solomon	800 meters	3rd	
Men's	2008 Outdoor	Corey White	Javelin throw	2nd	
Women's	2008 Outdoor	Jessica Onyepunuka	100 meters	5th	
Women's	2008 Outdoor	Shalina Clarke	100 meters hurdles	8th	
Women's	2008 Outdoor	Carol Rodríguez	400 meters	3rd	
Women's	2008 Outdoor	Eva Orban	Hammer throw	1st	
Men's	2009 Indoor	Manjula Wijesekara	High jump	7th	
Men's	2009 Outdoor	Ahmad Rashad	100 meters	2nd	
Men's	2009 Outdoor	Irek Sekrearski	800 meters	7th	
Men's	2009 Outdoor	Jason Price	4 × 400 meters relay	7th	
Men's	2009 Outdoor	Joey Hughes	4 × 400 meters relay	7th	
Men's	2009 Outdoor	Nate Anderson	4 × 400 meters relay	7th	
Men's	2009 Outdoor	Duane Walker	4 × 400 meters relay	7th	
Men's	2009 Outdoor	Manjula Wijesekara	High jump	3rd	
Men's	2009 Outdoor	Corey White	Javelin throw	2nd	
Women's	2009 Outdoor	Dalilah Muhammad	400 meters hurdles	3rd	
Women's	2009 Outdoor	Zsofia Erdelyi	3000 meters steeplechase	8th	
Women's	2009 Outdoor	Elizabeth Olear	4 × 400 meters relay	6th	
Women's	2009 Outdoor	Shalina Clarke	4 × 400 meters relay	6th	
Women's	2009 Outdoor	Dalilah Muhammad	4 × 400 meters relay	6th	
Women's	2009 Outdoor	Myra Hasson	4 × 400 meters relay	6th	
Women's	2009 Outdoor	Eva Orban	Hammer throw	2nd	
Women's	2009 Outdoor	Nia Ali	Heptathlon	4th	
Men's	2010 Indoor	Brandon Estrada	Pole vault	7th	
Men's	2010 Outdoor	Oscar Spurlock	110 meters hurdles	4th	
Men's	2010 Outdoor	Joey Hughes	400 meters	3rd	
Men's	2010 Outdoor	Reggie Wyatt	400 meters hurdles	8th	
Men's	2010 Outdoor	Bryshon Nellum	4 × 400 meters relay	5th	
Men's	2010 Outdoor	Nate Anderson	4 × 400 meters relay	5th	
Men's	2010 Outdoor	Joey Hughes	4 × 400 meters relay	5th	
Men's	2010 Outdoor	Reggie Wyatt	4 × 400 meters relay	5th	
Men's	2010 Outdoor	Manjula Wijesekara	High jump	2nd	
Men's	2010 Outdoor	Brandon Estrada	Pole vault	5th	
Men's	2010 Outdoor	Aaron Dan	Discus throw	5th	
Men's	2010 Outdoor	Trey Henderson	Hammer throw	5th	
Men's	2011 Indoor	Brendan Ames	60 meters hurdles	6th	
Men's	2011 Outdoor	Brendan Ames	110 meters hurdles	3rd	
Men's	2011 Outdoor	Joey Hughes	400 meters	5th	
Men's	2011 Outdoor	Josh Mance	400 meters	6th	
Men's	2011 Outdoor	Trey Henderson	Hammer throw	4th	
Women's	2011 Outdoor	Nia Ali	100 meters hurdles	1st	
Women's	2011 Outdoor	Aareon Payne	200 meters	5th	
Women's	2011 Outdoor	Jessica Davis	200 meters	8th	
Women's	2011 Outdoor	Dalilah Muhammad	400 meters hurdles	6th	
Women's	2011 Outdoor	Loudia Laarman	4 × 100 meters relay	3rd	
Women's	2011 Outdoor	Aareon Payne	4 × 100 meters relay	3rd	
Women's	2011 Outdoor	Jenna Puterbaugh	4 × 100 meters relay	3rd	
Women's	2011 Outdoor	Jessica Davis	4 × 100 meters relay	3rd	
Women's	2011 Outdoor	Nia Ali	High jump	6th	
Women's	2011 Outdoor	Jenny Ozorai	Hammer throw	6th	
Men's	2012 Outdoor	Aaron Brown	200 meters	7th	
Men's	2012 Outdoor	Josh Mance	400 meters	5th	
Men's	2012 Outdoor	Reggie Wyatt	400 meters hurdles	3rd	
Men's	2012 Outdoor	Joey Hughes	4 × 400 meters relay	2nd	
Men's	2012 Outdoor	Josh Mance	4 × 400 meters relay	2nd	
Men's	2012 Outdoor	Reggie Wyatt	4 × 400 meters relay	2nd	
Men's	2012 Outdoor	Bryshon Nellum	4 × 400 meters relay	2nd	
Women's	2012 Outdoor	Dalilah Muhammad	400 meters hurdles	5th	
Women's	2012 Outdoor	Loudia Laarman	4 × 100 meters relay	7th	
Women's	2012 Outdoor	Aareon Payne	4 × 100 meters relay	7th	
Women's	2012 Outdoor	CoCo Ndipagbor	4 × 100 meters relay	7th	
Women's	2012 Outdoor	Jessica Davis	4 × 100 meters relay	7th	
Women's	2012 Outdoor	Jenny Ozorai	Hammer throw	4th	
Women's	2012 Outdoor	Marissa Minderler	Hammer throw	8th	
Women's	2012 Outdoor	Kristine Busa	Javelin throw	8th	
Men's	2013 Outdoor	Aaron Brown	100 meters	5th	
Men's	2013 Outdoor	Bryshon Nellum	200 meters	3rd	
Men's	2013 Outdoor	Aaron Brown	200 meters	5th	
Men's	2013 Outdoor	Bryshon Nellum	400 meters	1st	
Men's	2013 Outdoor	Reggie Wyatt	400 meters hurdles	1st	
Men's	2013 Outdoor	Remy Conaster	Hammer throw	2nd	
Women's	2013 Outdoor	Loudia Laarman	4 × 100 meters relay	7th	
Women's	2013 Outdoor	Melia Cox	4 × 100 meters relay	7th	
Women's	2013 Outdoor	Jenna Puterbaugh	4 × 100 meters relay	7th	
Women's	2013 Outdoor	Vanessa Jones	4 × 100 meters relay	7th	
Women's	2013 Outdoor	Alitta Boyd	Triple jump	8th	
Women's	2013 Outdoor	Alex Collatz Sellens	Discus throw	5th	
Women's	2013 Outdoor	Jenny Ozorai	Hammer throw	4th	
Men's	2014 Indoor	Aaron Brown	60 meters	4th	
Men's	2014 Indoor	Aleec Harris	60 meters hurdles	5th	
Men's	2014 Indoor	Aaron Brown	200 meters	6th	
Women's	2014 Indoor	Tynia Gaither	200 meters	6th	
Women's	2014 Indoor	Coco Ndipagbor	400 meters	7th	
Women's	2014 Indoor	CoCo Ndipagbor	4 × 400 meters relay	6th	
Women's	2014 Indoor	Vanessa Jones	4 × 400 meters relay	6th	
Women's	2014 Indoor	Jaide Stepter	4 × 400 meters relay	6th	
Women's	2014 Indoor	Ashley Liverpool	4 × 400 meters relay	6th	
Men's	2014 Outdoor	Aaron Brown	100 meters	3rd	
Men's	2014 Outdoor	Aleec Harris	110 meters hurdles	2nd	
Men's	2014 Outdoor	Aaron Brown	200 meters	2nd	
Men's	2014 Outdoor	Aleec Harris	4 × 100 meters relay	4th	
Men's	2014 Outdoor	Aaron Brown	4 × 100 meters relay	4th	
Men's	2014 Outdoor	BeeJay Lee	4 × 100 meters relay	4th	
Men's	2014 Outdoor	Terence Abram	4 × 100 meters relay	4th	
Men's	2014 Outdoor	Viktor Fajoyomi	Decathlon	7th	
Women's	2014 Outdoor	Tynia Gaither	100 meters	8th	
Women's	2014 Outdoor	Tynia Gaither	200 meters	6th	
Women's	2014 Outdoor	Loudia Laarman	4 × 100 meters relay	2nd	
Women's	2014 Outdoor	Jessica Davis	4 × 100 meters relay	2nd	
Women's	2014 Outdoor	Alexis Faulknor	4 × 100 meters relay	2nd	
Women's	2014 Outdoor	Tynia Gaither	4 × 100 meters relay	2nd	
Women's	2014 Outdoor	Ashley Liverpool	4 × 400 meters relay	7th	
Women's	2014 Outdoor	CoCo Ndipagbor	4 × 400 meters relay	7th	
Women's	2014 Outdoor	Jessica Davis	4 × 400 meters relay	7th	
Women's	2014 Outdoor	Vanessa Jones	4 × 400 meters relay	7th	
Women's	2014 Outdoor	Alex Collatz Sellens	Discus throw	8th	
Men's	2015 Indoor	Andre De Grasse	200 meters	2nd	
Men's	2015 Indoor	Conor McCullough	Weight throw	2nd	
Women's	2015 Indoor	Ky Westbrook	60 meters	2nd	
Women's	2015 Indoor	Dior Hall	60 meters hurdles	8th	
Women's	2015 Indoor	Jaide Stepter	4 × 400 meters relay	3rd	
Women's	2015 Indoor	Amalie Iuel	4 × 400 meters relay	3rd	
Women's	2015 Indoor	Kendall Ellis	4 × 400 meters relay	3rd	
Women's	2015 Indoor	Vanessa Jones	4 × 400 meters relay	3rd	
Men's	2015 Outdoor	Andre De Grasse	100 meters	1st	
Men's	2015 Outdoor	Andre De Grasse	200 meters	1st	
Men's	2015 Outdoor	BeeJay Lee	4 × 100 meters relay	4th	
Men's	2015 Outdoor	Andre De Grasse	4 × 100 meters relay	4th	
Men's	2015 Outdoor	Just'N Thymes	4 × 100 meters relay	4th	
Men's	2015 Outdoor	Adoree Jackson	4 × 100 meters relay	4th	
Men's	2015 Outdoor	Randall Cunningham II	High jump	8th	
Men's	2015 Outdoor	Adoree Jackson	Long jump	5th	
Men's	2015 Outdoor	Nick Ponzio	Shot put	8th	
Men's	2015 Outdoor	Conor McCullough	Hammer throw	1st	
Women's	2015 Outdoor	Ky Westbrook	100 meters	4th	
Women's	2015 Outdoor	Dior Hall	100 meters hurdles	3rd	
Women's	2015 Outdoor	Amalie Iuel	400 meters hurdles	7th	
Women's	2015 Outdoor	Jaide Stepter Baynes	400 meters hurdles	8th	
Women's	2015 Outdoor	Dior Hall	4 × 100 meters relay	3rd	
Women's	2015 Outdoor	Ky Westbrook	4 × 100 meters relay	3rd	
Women's	2015 Outdoor	Alexis Faulknor	4 × 100 meters relay	3rd	
Women's	2015 Outdoor	Deanna Hill	4 × 100 meters relay	3rd	
Women's	2015 Outdoor	Jaide Stepter	4 × 400 meters relay	2nd	
Women's	2015 Outdoor	Amalie Iuel	4 × 400 meters relay	2nd	
Women's	2015 Outdoor	Kendall Ellis	4 × 400 meters relay	2nd	
Women's	2015 Outdoor	Vanessa Jones	4 × 400 meters relay	2nd	
Women's	2015 Outdoor	Tera Novy	Discus throw	4th	
Women's	2015 Outdoor	Alex Collatz Sellens	Discus throw	8th	
Men's	2016 Indoor	Eric Sloan	Long jump	6th	
Men's	2016 Indoor	Eric Sloan	Triple jump	4th	
Women's	2016 Indoor	Deanna Hill	200 meters	6th	
Women's	2016 Indoor	Jaide Stepter Baynes	400 meters	6th	
Women's	2016 Indoor	Jaide Stepter	4 × 400 meters relay	4th	
Women's	2016 Indoor	Kendall Ellis	4 × 400 meters relay	4th	
Women's	2016 Indoor	Amalie Iuel	4 × 400 meters relay	4th	
Women's	2016 Indoor	Deanna Hill	4 × 400 meters relay	4th	
Women's	2016 Indoor	Margaux Jones	Long jump	8th	
Women's	2016 Indoor	Amalie Iuel	Pentathlon	3rd	
Men's	2016 Outdoor	Ricky Morgan Jr.	400 meters	7th	
Men's	2016 Outdoor	Randall Cunningham II	High jump	1st	
Men's	2016 Outdoor	Adoree Jackson	Long jump	5th	
Women's	2016 Outdoor	Tynia Gaither	100 meters	4th	
Women's	2016 Outdoor	Tynia Gaither	200 meters	5th	
Women's	2016 Outdoor	Deanna Hill	200 meters	7th	
Women's	2016 Outdoor	Jaide Stepter Baynes	400 meters hurdles	6th	
Women's	2016 Outdoor	Destinee Brown	4 × 100 meters relay	2nd	
Women's	2016 Outdoor	Deanna Hill	4 × 100 meters relay	2nd	
Women's	2016 Outdoor	Alexis Faulknor	4 × 100 meters relay	2nd	
Women's	2016 Outdoor	Tynia Gaither	4 × 100 meters relay	2nd	
Women's	2016 Outdoor	Kendall Ellis	4 × 400 meters relay	8th	
Women's	2016 Outdoor	Amalie Iuel	4 × 400 meters relay	8th	
Women's	2016 Outdoor	Jaide Stepter	4 × 400 meters relay	8th	
Women's	2016 Outdoor	Deanna Hill	4 × 400 meters relay	8th	
Women's	2016 Outdoor	Tera Novy	Discus throw	7th	
Men's	2017 Indoor	Just'N Thymes	200 meters	3rd	
Men's	2017 Indoor	Randall Cunningham II	High jump	4th	
Women's	2017 Indoor	Anna Cockrell	60 meters hurdles	4th	
Women's	2017 Indoor	Deanna Hill	200 meters	3rd	
Women's	2017 Indoor	Kendall Ellis	400 meters	2nd	
Women's	2017 Indoor	Cameron Pettigrew	4 × 400 meters relay	1st	
Women's	2017 Indoor	Amalie Iuel	4 × 400 meters relay	1st	
Women's	2017 Indoor	Deanna Hill	4 × 400 meters relay	1st	
Women's	2017 Indoor	Kendall Ellis	4 × 400 meters relay	1st	
Women's	2017 Indoor	Brittany Mann	Shot put	3rd	
Men's	2017 Outdoor	Marquis Morris	110 meters hurdles	6th	
Men's	2017 Outdoor	Michael Norman	400 meters	4th	
Men's	2017 Outdoor	Eric Sloan	Long jump	6th	
Men's	2017 Outdoor	Nick Ponzio	Shot put	6th	
Women's	2017 Outdoor	Ky Westbrook	100 meters	8th	
Women's	2017 Outdoor	Dior Hall	100 meters hurdles	7th	
Women's	2017 Outdoor	Anna Cockrell	100 meters hurdles	8th	
Women's	2017 Outdoor	Deanna Hill	200 meters	6th	
Women's	2017 Outdoor	Kendall Ellis	400 meters	3rd	
Women's	2017 Outdoor	Cameron Pettigrew	400 meters	7th	
Women's	2017 Outdoor	Anna Cockrell	400 meters hurdles	2nd	
Women's	2017 Outdoor	Amalie Iuel	400 meters hurdles	3rd	
Women's	2017 Outdoor	Cameron Pettigrew	4 × 400 meters relay	2nd	
Women's	2017 Outdoor	Amalie Iuel	4 × 400 meters relay	2nd	
Women's	2017 Outdoor	Deanna Hill	4 × 400 meters relay	2nd	
Women's	2017 Outdoor	Kendall Ellis	4 × 400 meters relay	2nd	
Women's	2017 Outdoor	Brittany Mann	Shot put	3rd	
Men's	2018 Indoor	Rai Benjamin	200 meters	3rd	
Men's	2018 Indoor	Michael Norman	400 meters	1st	
Men's	2018 Indoor	Zach Shinnick	400 meters	8th	
Men's	2018 Indoor	Zach Shinnick	4 × 400 meters relay	1st	
Men's	2018 Indoor	Rai Benjamin	4 × 400 meters relay	1st	
Men's	2018 Indoor	Ricky Morgan	4 × 400 meters relay	1st	
Men's	2018 Indoor	Michael Norman	4 × 400 meters relay	1st	
Men's	2018 Indoor	Randall Cunningham II	High jump	1st	
Women's	2018 Indoor	Anna Cockrell	60 meters hurdles	2nd	
Women's	2018 Indoor	Kendall Ellis	400 meters	1st	
Women's	2018 Indoor	Kaelin Roberts	4 × 400 meters relay	1st	
Women's	2018 Indoor	Anna Cockrell	4 × 400 meters relay	1st	
Women's	2018 Indoor	Deanna Hill	4 × 400 meters relay	1st	
Women's	2018 Indoor	Kendall Ellis	4 × 400 meters relay	1st	
Men's	2018 Outdoor	Michael Norman	400 meters	1st	
Men's	2018 Outdoor	Rai Benjamin	400 meters hurdles	1st	
Men's	2018 Outdoor	Robert Ford	800 meters	7th	
Men's	2018 Outdoor	Ricky Morgan	4 × 400 meters relay	1st	
Men's	2018 Outdoor	Rai Benjamin	4 × 400 meters relay	1st	
Men's	2018 Outdoor	Zach Shinnick	4 × 400 meters relay	1st	
Men's	2018 Outdoor	Michael Norman	4 × 400 meters relay	1st	
Men's	2018 Outdoor	Earnie Sears	High jump	7th	
Women's	2018 Outdoor	TeeTee Terry	100 meters	3rd	
Women's	2018 Outdoor	Deanna Hill	100 meters	7th	
Women's	2018 Outdoor	Angie Annelus	200 meters	1st	
Women's	2018 Outdoor	Deanna Hill	200 meters	7th	
Women's	2018 Outdoor	Kendall Ellis	400 meters	2nd	
Women's	2018 Outdoor	Anna Cockrell	400 meters hurdles	2nd	
Women's	2018 Outdoor	Anglerne Annelus	4 × 100 meters relay	3rd	
Women's	2018 Outdoor	Kendall Ellis	4 × 100 meters relay	3rd	
Women's	2018 Outdoor	Deanna Hill	4 × 100 meters relay	3rd	
Women's	2018 Outdoor	Twanisha Terry	4 × 100 meters relay	3rd	
Women's	2018 Outdoor	Kyra Constantine	4 × 400 meters relay	1st	
Women's	2018 Outdoor	Anna Cockrell	4 × 400 meters relay	1st	
Women's	2018 Outdoor	Deanna Hill	4 × 400 meters relay	1st	
Women's	2018 Outdoor	Kendall Ellis	4 × 400 meters relay	1st	
Women's	2018 Outdoor	Madisen Richards	Long jump	8th	
Men's	2019 Indoor	Isaiah Jewett	800 meters	7th	
Men's	2019 Indoor	Earnie Sears	High jump	4th	
Men's	2019 Indoor	Matthew Katnik	Shot put	7th	
Men's	2019 Indoor	Ayden Owens-Delerme	Heptathlon	6th	
Women's	2019 Indoor	TeeTee Terry	60 meters	1st	
Women's	2019 Indoor	Chanel Brissett	60 meters hurdles	1st	
Women's	2019 Indoor	Dior Hall	60 meters hurdles	6th	
Women's	2019 Indoor	Mecca McGlaston	60 meters hurdles	7th	
Women's	2019 Indoor	Lanae-Tava Thomas	200 meters	4th	
Women's	2019 Indoor	Kaelin Roberts	400 meters	1st	
Women's	2019 Indoor	Kyra Constantine	400 meters	3rd	
Women's	2019 Indoor	Kyra Constantine	4 × 400 meters relay	6th	
Women's	2019 Indoor	Bailey Lear	4 × 400 meters relay	6th	
Women's	2019 Indoor	Lanae-Tava Thomas	4 × 400 meters relay	6th	
Women's	2019 Indoor	Kaelin Roberts	4 × 400 meters relay	6th	
Men's	2019 Outdoor	Cameron Samuel	400 meters hurdles	6th	
Men's	2019 Outdoor	Matthew Katnik	Shot put	6th	
Women's	2019 Outdoor	TeeTee Terry	100 meters	3rd	
Women's	2019 Outdoor	Angie Annelus	100 meters	7th	
Women's	2019 Outdoor	Chanel Brissett	100 meters hurdles	2nd	
Women's	2019 Outdoor	Anna Cockrell	100 meters hurdles	5th	
Women's	2019 Outdoor	Angie Annelus	200 meters	1st	
Women's	2019 Outdoor	Lanae-Tava Thomas	200 meters	6th	
Women's	2019 Outdoor	Kyra Constantine	400 meters	6th	
Women's	2019 Outdoor	Anna Cockrell	400 meters hurdles	1st	
Women's	2019 Outdoor	Chanel Brissett	4 × 100 meters relay	1st	
Women's	2019 Outdoor	Anglerne Annelus	4 × 100 meters relay	1st	
Women's	2019 Outdoor	Lanae-Tava Thomas	4 × 100 meters relay	1st	
Women's	2019 Outdoor	Twanisha Terry	4 × 100 meters relay	1st	
Women's	2019 Outdoor	Bailey Lear	4 × 400 meters relay	8th	
Women's	2019 Outdoor	Kyra Constantine	4 × 400 meters relay	8th	
Women's	2019 Outdoor	Anna Cockrell	4 × 400 meters relay	8th	
Women's	2019 Outdoor	Kaelin Roberts	4 × 400 meters relay	8th	
Men's	2021 Indoor	Brendon Stewart	60 meters	8th	
Men's	2021 Indoor	Earnie Sears	High jump	2nd	
Men's	2021 Indoor	McKay Johnson	Shot put	2nd	
Women's	2021 Indoor	TeeTee Terry	60 meters	2nd	
Women's	2021 Indoor	Mecca McGlaston	60 meters hurdles	6th	
Women's	2021 Indoor	TeeTee Terry	200 meters	4th	
Women's	2021 Indoor	Kaelin Roberts	400 meters	1st	
Women's	2021 Indoor	Bailey Lear	4 × 400 meters relay	2nd	
Women's	2021 Indoor	Jan'Taijah Ford	4 × 400 meters relay	2nd	
Women's	2021 Indoor	Nicole Yeargin	4 × 400 meters relay	2nd	
Women's	2021 Indoor	Kaelin Roberts	4 × 400 meters relay	2nd	
Women's	2021 Indoor	Morgan Smalls	High jump	8th	
Men's	2021 Outdoor	Davonte Burnett	100 meters	5th	
Men's	2021 Outdoor	Tade Ojora	110 meters hurdles	6th	
Men's	2021 Outdoor	Davonte Burnett	200 meters	6th	
Men's	2021 Outdoor	Cameron Samuel	400 meters hurdles	3rd	
Men's	2021 Outdoor	Isaiah Jewett	800 meters	1st	
Men's	2021 Outdoor	Nicholas Ramey	4 × 400 meters relay	4th	
Men's	2021 Outdoor	Brian Herron	4 × 400 meters relay	4th	
Men's	2021 Outdoor	Cameron Samuel	4 × 400 meters relay	4th	
Men's	2021 Outdoor	Isaiah Jewett	4 × 400 meters relay	4th	
Men's	2021 Outdoor	Earnie Sears	High jump	7th	
Women's	2021 Outdoor	TeeTee Terry	100 meters	2nd	
Women's	2021 Outdoor	Lanae-Tava Thomas	100 meters	7th	
Women's	2021 Outdoor	Anna Cockrell	100 meters hurdles	1st	
Women's	2021 Outdoor	TeeTee Terry	200 meters	5th	
Women's	2021 Outdoor	Angie Annelus	200 meters	6th	
Women's	2021 Outdoor	Kyra Constantine	400 meters	3rd	
Women's	2021 Outdoor	Nicole Yeargin	400 meters	4th	
Women's	2021 Outdoor	Bailey Lear	400 meters	7th	
Women's	2021 Outdoor	Anna Cockrell	400 meters hurdles	1st	
Women's	2021 Outdoor	Jasmine Jones	4 × 100 meters relay	1st	
Women's	2021 Outdoor	Anglerne Annelus	4 × 100 meters relay	1st	
Women's	2021 Outdoor	Lanae-Tava Thomas	4 × 100 meters relay	1st	
Women's	2021 Outdoor	Twanisha Terry	4 × 100 meters relay	1st	
Women's	2021 Outdoor	Bailey Lear	4 × 400 meters relay	2nd	
Women's	2021 Outdoor	Kaelin Roberts	4 × 400 meters relay	2nd	
Women's	2021 Outdoor	Nicole Yeargin	4 × 400 meters relay	2nd	
Women's	2021 Outdoor	Kyra Constantine	4 × 400 meters relay	2nd	
Women's	2021 Outdoor	Morgan Smalls	High jump	4th	
Women's	2021 Outdoor	Temi Ojora	Triple jump	8th	
Men's	2022 Indoor	Davonte Burnett	60 meters	1st	
Men's	2022 Indoor	Brendon Stewart	60 meters	6th	
Men's	2022 Indoor	Nicholas Ramey	4 × 400 meters relay	8th	
Men's	2022 Indoor	Zach Shinnick	4 × 400 meters relay	8th	
Men's	2022 Indoor	Brendon Stewart	4 × 400 meters relay	8th	
Men's	2022 Indoor	Johnnie Blockburger	4 × 400 meters relay	8th	
Women's	2022 Indoor	Mecca McGlaston	60 meters hurdles	5th	
Women's	2022 Indoor	Jan'Taijah Jones	400 meters	5th	
Women's	2022 Indoor	Bailey Lear	4 × 400 meters relay	4th	
Women's	2022 Indoor	Kimberly Harris	4 × 400 meters relay	4th	
Women's	2022 Indoor	Jasmine Jones	4 × 400 meters relay	4th	
Women's	2022 Indoor	Jan'Taijah Ford	4 × 400 meters relay	4th	
Men's	2022 Outdoor	Tade Ojora	110 meters hurdles	8th	
Men's	2022 Outdoor	Nicholas Ramey	4 × 400 meters relay	2nd	
Men's	2022 Outdoor	Zach Shinnick	4 × 400 meters relay	2nd	
Men's	2022 Outdoor	Johnnie Blockburger	4 × 400 meters relay	2nd	
Men's	2022 Outdoor	Kasaun James	4 × 400 meters relay	2nd	
Men's	2022 Outdoor	Trey Knight	Hammer throw	8th	
Women's	2022 Outdoor	Jasmine Jones	100 meters hurdles	2nd	
Men's	2023 Indoor	Justin Braun	4 × 400 meters relay	3rd	
Men's	2023 Indoor	Ashton Allen	4 × 400 meters relay	3rd	
Men's	2023 Indoor	William Jones	4 × 400 meters relay	3rd	
Men's	2023 Indoor	Johnnie Blockburger	4 × 400 meters relay	3rd	
Men's	2023 Indoor	Johnny Brackins	Long jump	5th	
Women's	2023 Indoor	Caisja Chandler	200 meters	7th	
Women's	2023 Indoor	Jan'Taijah Jones	400 meters	5th	
Women's	2023 Indoor	Bailey Lear	4 × 400 meters relay	4th	
Women's	2023 Indoor	Jasmine Jones	4 × 400 meters relay	4th	
Women's	2023 Indoor	Yemi John	4 × 400 meters relay	4th	
Women's	2023 Indoor	Jan'Taijah Jones	4 × 400 meters relay	4th	
Women's	2023 Indoor	Allie Jones	Pentathlon	2nd	
Men's	2023 Outdoor	Tade Ojora	110 meters hurdles	4th	
Men's	2023 Outdoor	Nikolaos Polychroniou	Hammer throw	5th	
Women's	2023 Outdoor	Caisja Chandler	200 meters	6th	
Women's	2023 Outdoor	Bailey Lear	4 × 400 meters relay	4th	
Women's	2023 Outdoor	Christine Mallard	4 × 400 meters relay	4th	
Women's	2023 Outdoor	Caisja Chandler	4 × 400 meters relay	4th	
Women's	2023 Outdoor	Yemi John	4 × 400 meters relay	4th	
Women's	2023 Outdoor	Temi Ojora	Triple jump	6th	
Women's	2023 Outdoor	Allie Jones	Heptathlon	4th	
Men's	2024 Indoor	Travis Williams	60 meters	5th	
Men's	2024 Indoor	Johnny Brackins	60 meters hurdles	2nd	
Men's	2024 Indoor	William Jones	400 meters	5th	
Men's	2024 Indoor	Justin Braun	4 × 400 meters relay	7th	
Men's	2024 Indoor	Johnnie Blockburger	4 × 400 meters relay	7th	
Men's	2024 Indoor	Jacob Andrews	4 × 400 meters relay	7th	
Men's	2024 Indoor	William Jones	4 × 400 meters relay	7th	
Men's	2024 Indoor	Johnny Brackins	Long jump	4th	
Women's	2024 Indoor	Jasmine Jones	60 meters hurdles	1st	
Women's	2024 Indoor	Yemi John	400 meters	6th	
Women's	2024 Indoor	Jan'Taijah Jones	4 × 400 meters relay	2nd	
Women's	2024 Indoor	Jasmine Jones	4 × 400 meters relay	2nd	
Women's	2024 Indoor	Yemi John	4 × 400 meters relay	2nd	
Women's	2024 Indoor	Madison Whyte	4 × 400 meters relay	2nd	
Women's	2024 Indoor	Temi Ojora	Triple jump	8th	
Women's	2024 Indoor	Allie Jones	Pentathlon	4th	
Men's	2024 Outdoor	Johnnie Blockburger	400 meters	4th	
Men's	2024 Outdoor	William Jones	4 × 400 meters relay	8th	
Men's	2024 Outdoor	Jacob Andrews	4 × 400 meters relay	8th	
Men's	2024 Outdoor	Darius Rainey	4 × 400 meters relay	8th	
Men's	2024 Outdoor	Johnnie Blockburger	4 × 400 meters relay	8th	
Men's	2024 Outdoor	JC Stevenson	Long jump	1st	
Men's	2024 Outdoor	Johnny Brackins	Long jump	4th	
Men's	2024 Outdoor	Racquil Broderick	Discus throw	2nd	
Men's	2024 Outdoor	Nikolaos Polychroniou	Hammer throw	5th	
Women's	2024 Outdoor	Jasmine Jones	100 meters hurdles	4th	
Women's	2024 Outdoor	Jalaysiya Smith	100 meters hurdles	8th	
Women's	2024 Outdoor	Jassani Carter	200 meters	5th	
Women's	2024 Outdoor	Jan'Taijah Jones	400 meters	7th	
Women's	2024 Outdoor	Jasmine Jones	400 meters hurdles	1st	
Women's	2024 Outdoor	Temi Ojora	Triple jump	6th	
Men's	2025 Indoor	Travis Williams	60 meters	5th	
Men's	2025 Indoor	JC Stevenson	60 meters	6th	
Men's	2025 Indoor	Johnny Brackins	60 meters hurdles	4th	
Men's	2025 Indoor	Garrett Kaalund	200 meters	4th	
Men's	2025 Indoor	Johnnie Blockburger	200 meters	6th	
Men's	2025 Indoor	William Jones	400 meters	5th	
Men's	2025 Indoor	William Jones	4 × 400 meters relay	4th	
Men's	2025 Indoor	Jacob Andrews	4 × 400 meters relay	4th	
Men's	2025 Indoor	Garrett Kaalund	4 × 400 meters relay	4th	
Men's	2025 Indoor	Johnnie Blockburger	4 × 400 meters relay	4th	
Men's	2025 Indoor	Brady Palen	High jump	5th	
Men's	2025 Indoor	Elias Gerald	High jump	5th	
Men's	2025 Indoor	JC Stevenson	Long jump	6th	
Men's	2025 Indoor	Johnny Brackins	Long jump	8th	
Women's	2025 Indoor	Dajaz Defrand	60 meters	1st	
Women's	2025 Indoor	Samirah Moody	60 meters	5th	
Women's	2025 Indoor	Dajaz Defrand	200 meters	4th	
Women's	2025 Indoor	Madison Whyte	200 meters	5th	
Women's	2025 Indoor	Yemi John	4 × 400 meters relay	3rd	
Women's	2025 Indoor	Takiya Cenci	4 × 400 meters relay	3rd	
Women's	2025 Indoor	Jassani Carter	4 × 400 meters relay	3rd	
Women's	2025 Indoor	Christine Mallard	4 × 400 meters relay	3rd	
Women's	2025 Indoor	Temi Ojora	Triple jump	3rd	

== See also ==
- Category:USC Trojans men's track and field athletes (160)
- Category:USC Trojans women's track and field athletes (56)
