= Henry Jackson (triple jumper) =

Jamaican athlete (born 1947)

Personal information
- Nationality: Jamaican
- Born: 25 October 1947 (age 79)

Sport
- Sport: Athletics
- Events: Long jump Triple jump

Henry Jackson (born 25 October 1947) is a Jamaican athlete. He competed in the men's long jump and the men's triple jump at the 1972 Summer Olympics.

Jackson was an All-American jumper for the USC Trojans track and field team, finishing runner-up in the triple jump at the 1972 NCAA Indoor Track and Field Championships. Before USC, he competed for Mesa Community College.
