= Bob Fisher (offensive lineman) =

American football player (1916–1983)

No. 38
- Positions: Guard, tackle

Personal information
- Born: August 27, 1916; Los Angeles, California
- Died: May 1983 (age 66)

Career information
- College: Southern California

Career history
- 1940: Washington Redskins

Robert Arthur Fisher (August 27, 1916 – May 1983) was an American football offensive lineman in the National Football League for the Washington Redskins. He played college football at the University of Southern California.

Fisher was also an All-American thrower for the USC Trojans track and field team, finishing 8th in the shot put at the 1939 NCAA track and field championships.
