= 1942 NCAA track and field championships =

1942 NCAA Track and Field Championships
- Team Champion: USC (11th title)
- Edition: 21st
- Dates: June 12-13, 1942
- Host city: Lincoln, Nebraska
- Venue: Memorial Stadium

The 1942 NCAA Track and Field Championships were contested as part of the 21st annual track meet to determine the team and individual national champions of men's collegiate track and field in the United States. This year's events were held at Memorial Stadium at the University of Nebraska in Lincoln.

USC captured the team national championship, their eleventh title.

== Team result ==
- Note: Top 10 finishers only

Rank	Team	Points
1st place, gold medalist(s)	USC	85 1/2
2nd place, silver medalist(s)	Ohio State	44 1/5
3rd place, bronze medalist(s)	California	30 1/2
4	Nebraska	29
5	Minnesota	20
6	Notre Dame; Rice	18
7	Alabama State Teachers; Georgetown	16
8	Arizona State	15
9	Fresno State; Oklahoma; Southern–Baton Rouge	10
10	Indiana	9

== See also ==
- NCAA Men's Outdoor Track and Field Championship
- 1941 NCAA Men's Cross Country Championships
