= 1951 NCAA track and field championships =

1951 NCAA Track and Field Championships
- Edition: 30th
- Dates: June 15-16, 1951
- Host city: (Washington (state)) Seattle, Washington
- Venue: Husky Stadium

The 1951 NCAA Track and Field Championships were contested at the 30th annual NCAA-hosted track meet to determine the team and individual national champions of men's collegiate track and field events in the United States. This year's meet was hosted by the University of Washington at Husky Stadium in Seattle.

USC won their third consecutive team national championship, their 15th team title overall.

== Team Result ==
- Note: Top 10 only
- (H) = Hosts

Rank	Team	Points
1st place, gold medalist(s)	Southern California	56
2nd place, silver medalist(s)	Cornell	40
3rd place, bronze medalist(s)	Morgan State	38
4	Occidental	24
5	Michigan State	23
6	UCLA	18 1/5
7	Auburn	18
8	Texas A&M	17
9	Florida	15
10	Washington State	14 1/6

== See also ==
- NCAA Men's Outdoor Track and Field Championship
- 1950 NCAA Men's Cross Country Championships
