= Justin Braun (sprinter) =

American sprinter (born 2004)

Personal information
- Born: 13 February 2004 (age 22)

Sport
- Sport: Athletics
- Event: Sprint

Achievements and titles
- Personal best: 400m: 43.99 (2026)

Justin Braun (born 13 February 2004) is an American sprinter who specialises in the 400 metres.

== Biography ==
From Westerville, Ohio, Braun attended Westerville Central High School. He won Ohio state high titles in 100 metres, 200 metres and 400 metres, his winning time in the 100 m of 10.47 seconds equalling the state meet record. In 2022, he won the New Balance Indoor Nationals 400 m title with a time of 46.21 seconds. After graduating high school he agreed to compete for the University of Southern California.

In 2023 and 2024, Braun was an All-American for the USC Trojans track and field team. After transferring to the University of Florida, Brain ran in the 4 x 400 metres relay at the 2025 NCAA Division I Outdoor Track and Field Championships.

On 14 March 2026, Braun moved to ninth on the world all-time list for the short track 400 metres, finishing runner-up to Nigerian Samuel Ogazi at the 2026 NCAA Indoor Championships in Fayetteville, Arkansas, running the final in 44.67 seconds.

From 27 to 30 May 2026, Braun competed in the 2026 NCAA Division I East Regionals. In the first round of the 400 metres, he ran 44.80 seconds. He advanced to the quarterfinal round, where he finished second behind Ogazi, who set the world leading time at the time of the race, and ran a personal best of 43.99 seconds in the 400 metres. On 12 June, he placed sixth in the 400 m final at the 2026 NCAA Outdoor Championships, running 44.79 seconds.
