= Roy Staley =

American hurdler

Personal information
- Nationality: American
- Born: April 18, 1915 Los Angeles, California, United States
- Died: March 25, 2001 (aged 85)
- Height: 6 ft 0 in (183 cm)
- Weight: 170 lb (77 kg)

Sport
- Sport: Track and field
- Event: 110 metres hurdles

Roy Mason Staley (April 18, 1915 – March 25, 2001) was an American hurdler. He competed in the men's 110 metres hurdles at the 1936 Summer Olympics.

Staley was an All-American hurdler for the USC Trojans track and field team, finishing runner-up in the 110 m hurdles at the 1937 NCAA Track and Field Championships.
