= Travis Hannah =

American football player (born 1971)

No. 82, 80
- Position: Wide receiver

Personal information
- Born: January 31, 1970 (age 56); Los Angeles, California, U.S.
- Listed height: 5 ft 7 in (1.70 m)
- Listed weight: 161 lb (73 kg)

Career information
- High school: Hawthorne (Hawthorne, California)
- College: USC
- NFL draft: 1993: 4th round, 102nd overall pick
- Expansion draft: 1995: 18th round, 35th overall pick

Career history
- Houston Oilers (1993–1995); Chicago Bears (1996)*; Frankfurt Galaxy (1997); San Francisco 49ers (1997)*; Los Angeles Avengers (2000–2001)
- * Offseason or practice squad member only

Career NFL statistics
- Receptions: 13
- Receiving yards: 166
- Return yards: 210
- Stats at Pro Football Reference

Career AFL statistics
- Receptions: 102
- Receiving yards: 1,414
- Receiving touchdowns: 27
- Stats at ArenaFan.com

Travis Hannah (born January 31, 1970) is an American former professional football player who was a wide receiver in the National Football League (NFL). He played college football for the USC Trojans.

== Early life ==
Hannah prepped at Hawthorne High School. Hannah was a top 400 meter sprinter and was the California CIF State Champion in 1988 with a time of 47.20. See the race. He also anchored his team to a dominating 5 second victory in the 4 × 400 meters relay. See the race. The year before, Hannah came from far off the pace to finish second to Steve Lewis in a hand timed 47.2. See the race. In 1988, Lewis became the Olympic Champion.

== College career ==
Hannah graduated from USC. He was an All-American sprinter for the USC Trojans track and field team, leading off their runner-up 4 × 400 meters relay at the 1992 NCAA Division I Outdoor Track and Field Championships and finishing 4th in the 400 meters at the 1992 NCAA Division I Outdoor Track and Field Championships.

== Professional career ==
Hannah was selected with the 102nd pick in the fourth round of the 1993 NFL draft by the Houston Oilers where he played between 1993 and 1995. He was selected by the Jacksonville Jaguars in the 1995 NFL expansion draft. He later played for the Arena Football League Los Angeles Avengers.
