= Gary Carlsen =

American discus thrower

Personal information
- Born: May 12, 1945 (age 81) Ashland, Kentucky, United States

Sport
- Sport: Track and field
Medal record
Representing United States
Pan American Games
Gold medal – first place	1967 Winnipeg	Discus throw
Summer Universiade
Gold medal – first place	1967 Tokyo	Discus throw

Gary David Carlsen (born May 12, 1945) is a retired male discus thrower from the United States. He represented his native country at the 1968 Summer Olympics in Mexico City, where he ended up in sixth place in the overall-rankings. Carlsen is best known for winning the gold medal in the men's discus event at the 1967 Summer Universiade and at the 1967 Pan American Games.

Carlsen was an All-American thrower for the USC Trojans track and field team, finishing runner-up in the discus at the 1966 NCAA University Division outdoor track and field championships and 1967 NCAA University Division outdoor track and field championships.
