= Roland Sink =

American middle-distance runner

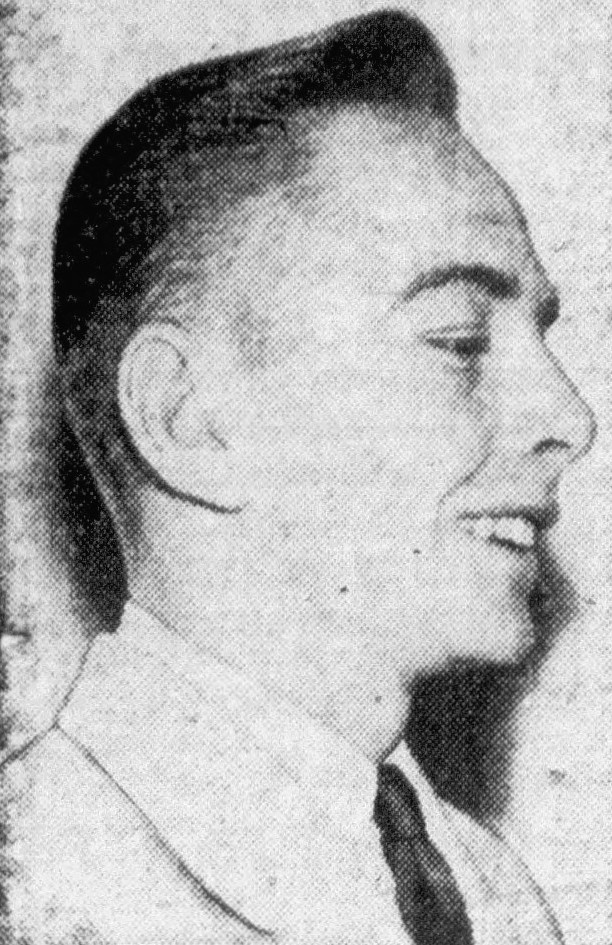
- Sink, circa 1945

Personal information
- Nationality: American
- Born: April 5, 1926
- Died: May 18, 2015 (aged 89)

Sport
- Sport: Middle-distance running
- Event: 1500 metres

Roland Sink (April 5, 1926 – May 18, 2015) was an American middle-distance runner. He competed in the men's 1500 metres at the 1948 Summer Olympics.

Sink was an All-American runner for the USC Trojans track and field team, finishing 3rd in the 3000 meters at the 1947 NCAA track and field championships and 3rd in the 1500 meters at the 1948 NCAA track and field championships.
