= James Stewart (decathlete) =

American decathlete

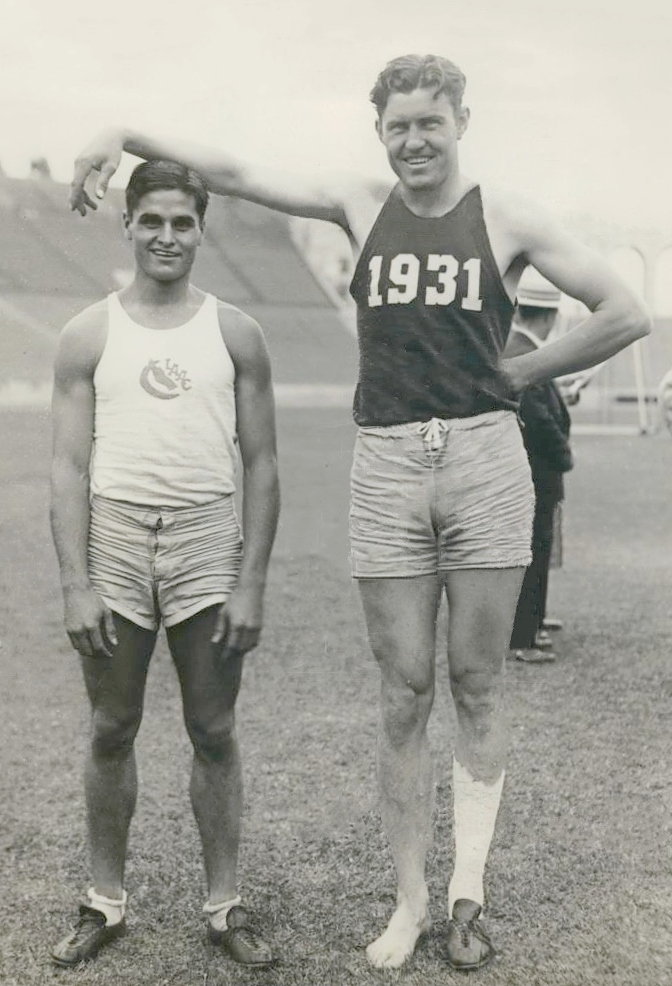
- Stewart (right) in 1928

Personal information
- Born: December 6, 1906 Barstow, Texas, U.S.
- Died: January 20, 1991 (aged 84) Sweetwater, Texas, U.S.
- Height: 190 cm (6 ft 3 in)
- Weight: 82 kg (181 lb)

Sport
- Sport: Athletics
- Event: Decathlon
- Club: Los Angeles Athletic Club

Achievements and titles
- Personal best: HJ – 1.988 m (1930)

James Daniel Stewart (December 6, 1906 – January 20, 1991) was an American decathlete. He competed at the 1928 Summer Olympics and finished fourth. He placed second at the AAU championships in 1928 and 1930 and fourth in 1927. He was also an accomplished high jumper, and representing the USC Trojans track and field team he was the 1930 NCAA high jump champion.
