= Bernd Kneißler =

German shot putter

Bernd Kneißler (born 13 September 1962) is a retired West German shot putter.

Kneißler was an All-American thrower for the USC Trojans track and field team, finishing 3rd in the discus throw at the 1986 NCAA Division I Outdoor Track and Field Championships.

He finished ninth at the 1990 European Indoor Championships. Kneißler represented the sports club Salamander Kornwestheim, and became West German champion in 1985.

His personal best throw was 20.27 metres, achieved in August 1990 in Leverkusen.
