= Tom Andrews (sprinter) =

American hurdler (born 1954)

Personal information
- Nationality: American
- Born: June 15, 1954 (age 72) Bakersfield, California, United States

Sport
- Sport: Athletics
- Events: 400m, 400m hurdles
Medal record
Representing United States
Summer Universiade
Gold medal – first place	1977 Sofia	400m hurdles
Gold medal – first place	1977 Sofia	4x400m relay

Tom Andrews (born June 15, 1954) is an American retired hurdler. Running for the University of Southern California, he was the 1977 NCAA Champion in the 400 meters hurdles.

While at West Bakersfield High School, he finished second in the 400 meters at the 1973 CIF California State Meet.

Andrews won the British AAA Championships title in the 400 metres (flat) event at the 1977 AAA Championships.
