= JC Stevenson =

American athlete (born 2004)

Personal information
- Born: Chrstyn John Stevenson; June 2, 2004 (age 22)

Sport
- Sport: Athletics
- Event(s): Sprint, Long jump

Achievements and titles
- Personal best(s): 60 m: 6.46 s (Virginia Beach, 2025); Long jump: 8.17 m (Albuquerque, 2025)

Chrstyn John Stevenson (born June 2, 2004) also known as JC Stevenson is an American long jumper and sprinter. He won the long jump title at the 2024 NCAA Championships.

== Early and personal life ==
From Temecula, California, he attended Great Oak High School. His siblings Cynamon, CJ and Summer, also compete in athletics.

== Career ==
He competes at the collegiate level for University of Southern California. In June 2024, he won the 2024 NCAA Division I Outdoor Track and Field Championships title in the long jump, with a winning jump of 8.22 metres to finish ahead of Jeremiah Davis. In doing so, he became USC's first long jump champion since 1977.

In February 2025, he jumped an indoor personal best at the Collegiate Classic of 8.17 metres. In early 2025, he lowered his 60 meters personal best to 6.50 seconds. He lowered his 60m personal best again, running 6.46 seconds in the preliminaries at the 2025 NCAA Indoor Championships in Virginia Beach in March 2025. At the Championships, he also placed sixth in the final of the long jump, helping USC win the overall men's track title.
