= Lanae-Tava Thomas =

Jamaican athlete

Personal information
- Nationality: Jamaican/American
- Born: 28 January 2001 (age 25) Saint Andrew, Jamaica

Sport
- Sport: Athletics
- Event: Sprint
- College team: USC Trojans; Texas Longhorns
- Coached by: Edrick Floreal

Achievements and titles
- Personal bests: 100m: 11.06 (Sacramento, 2023); 200m: 22.34 (Kingston, 2024); 400m: 51.22 (Gainesville, 2023)
Medal record
Women's athletics
Representing United States
Pan American U20 Championships
Gold medal – first place	2019 San José	200 m

Lanae-Tava Thomas (born 28 January 2001) is a Jamaican track and field athlete who competes as a sprinter. She finished second at the Jamaican national championships over 200 metres in 2024.

== Early life ==
Born in Jamaica and educated at Vaz Prep School in Kingston, Jamaica. She was also schooled at Rush–Henrietta Central School District in New York, and was a member of Max Velocity Track and Field Club.

== Junior career ==
She was an 11-time New York State Champion in the long jump and sprint events. She attended the University of Southern California where she was part of a winning NCAA 4 × 100 m relay team. She represented the United States at the 2019 Pan American U20 Athletics Championships in Costa Rica, winning gold in the 200 metres. In 2021, she won the NCAA 4 × 100 m relay for a second time in three years. That year, the USC women won the overall NCAA title. She later transferred to the University of Texas.

== Senior career ==
She is coached by Edrick Floreal. After changing her international registration to Jamaica, she finished third in the 200m at the 2023 Jamaican National Championship. However, she was unable to compete at the 2023 World Athletics Championships in Budapest due to administrative difficulties over her registration. She signed an endorsement deal with Puma in 2023.

In January 2024, she won 400 metres at the Dr. Martin Luther King Collegiate Invitational, in a time of 51.97 seconds. In February 2024, she was selected to run for Jamaica at the 2024 World Athletics Indoor Championships in Glasgow. She ran the opening leg in the final of the 4 × 400 m relay in Glasgow.

She ran 22.84 seconds for the 200 metres to finish third at the Jamaica Invitational in May 2024. She produced a lifetime best of 22.36 seconds to win the women's 200 metres at the Racers Grand Prix in Kingston, Jamaica on 1 June 2024. She finished second in the 200 meters at the 2024 Jamaican Championships on 30 June 2024.

She competed at the 2024 Summer Olympics in Paris over 200 metres, reaching the semi-finals.

== Personal life ==
Born in Saint Andrew Parish, Jamaica, she moved to Rochester, New York in 2012. Her parents are called Michelle and Lancelot. She has brothers Howard Bailey and Giovanni, and a sister called Lorriel.
