= Charles A. Lee =

American sprinter (born 1977)

Charles Lee
Personal information
- Born: November 18, 1977 (age 48) Nashville, Tennessee, U.S.

Sport
- Sport: Sprinting
- University team: University of Southern California

Charles Lee (born November 18, 1977) was an American sprinting athlete. He was a four-time All-American short sprinter at the University of Southern California in the late-1990s.

== Early life ==
Lee was born in Nashville, Tennessee, and raised in Pacoima neighborhood of Los Angeles. He attended Cleveland High School and Los Angeles Valley College. As a youth, Lee was a member of the North Valley Golden Bears Track Club and Los Angeles Jets Track Club.

== College career ==
He is the record holder in both the 100 meters and 200 meters at both schools. Lee went on to the University of Southern California (coached by John Henry Johnson and Ron Allice) where he ranked as a top-50 sprinter in the world and earned All-American status six times as both a solo sprinter and relay runner throughout his college career. Lee graduated from USC in 1999.

== Accomplishments ==
- Los Angeles City Section Champion 200 Meters - 1995
- California Interscholastic Federation All State Honors 200 Meters - 1995
- AAU Junior Olympic Games Medalist 100 Meters 200 Meters 4X100 & 4X400 Relays - 1996
- USATF Youth Nationals Gold Medalist 100 meters 4X100 & 4X400 Relays - 1996
- JUCO All-American 100 Meters - 1997
- JUCO All-American 200 Meters - 1997
- NCAA Division I All-American 200 Meters - 1998
- NCAA Division I All-American 4 x 100 Meter Relay Team - 1999
- NCAA Division I All-American 4 x 400 Meter Relay Team - 1999
- NCAA Division I All-American 200 Meter - 1999
- Texas Relays Champion 1600 Meter Relay - 1999
- Pacific-10 Conference Champion - 1999
- University of Southern California Track & Field Team MVP - 1999
- Los Angeles Valley College Record Holder - 100 Meters & 200 Meters
- Los Angeles Valley College Athletic Hall Of Fame Inductee - 2011
- Western State Conference Champion - 1996 1997
- USA Track & Field National Meet Qualifier - 1995 1996 1997 1998 1999 2000 2001 2002 2003 2004 2005
- USA Track & Field National Meet Semi Finalist - 1998 1999
- USA Track & Field Olympic Trials Qualifier - 1996 2000 2004
