= Davonte Burnett =

Jamaican sprinter (born 2000)

Personal information
- Nationality: Jamaica
- Born: 27 February 2000 (age 26)

Sport
- Sport: Athletics
- Event: Sprint
- College team: USC Trojans, Houston Cougars

Achievements and titles
- Personal best(s): 60m: 6.50 (Birmingham, 2022); 100m: 9.99 (Walnut, 2022); 200m: 20.38 (Los Angeles, 2022)

Davonte Burnett (born 27 February 2000) is a Jamaican track and field athlete who competes as a sprinter.

== Early life ==
Burnett attended Needham High School in Massachusetts and the University of Southern California in the United States.

== Career ==
In 2017 in New England, Burnett lowered his personal best for the 100 metres to 10.48 seconds in winning the six-state New England Championships.

=== 2021 ===
In June 2021, Burnett ran 10.05 seconds in the 100 metres at the Jamaican National Trials to win his qualifying heat. He was subsequently named in the provisional Jamaica squad for the delayed 2020 Summer Olympics as part of the relay pool. However, an injury sustained prior to the Olympics prevented his travel to Tokyo.

=== 2022 ===
In March 2022, Burnett won the 60m race at the NCAA Indoor Championships in Birmingham, Alabama, lowering his personal best to 6.58 in the preliminary rounds and to 6.50 seconds in the final. That month he was named the Athlete of the Year for the West Region by the USTFCCCA.

In April 2022, Burnett broke the 10-second barrier, clocking 9.99 seconds for the 100 metres in Walnut, California. However, he missed the outdoor 2022 NCAA Championships with injury.

=== 2023 ===
In April 2023, Burnett aggravated his previously injured hamstring whilst racing for the USC Trojans. At the end of the year, Burnett transferred to the University of Houston.

== Personal life ==
In 2021, Burnett switched his national allegiance from the United States to Jamaica.
