= 1972 NCAA Indoor Track and Field Championships =

- Dates: March 10−11, 1972
- Host city: Detroit, Michigan
- Venue: Cobo Arena

The 1972 NCAA Indoor Track and Field Championships were contested March 10−11, 1972 at Cobo Arena in Detroit, Michigan at the eighth annual NCAA-sanctioned track meet to determine the individual and team national champions of men's collegiate indoor track and field events in the United States.

USC topped the team standings, the Trojans' second indoor team title.

== Qualification ==
Unlike other NCAA-sponsored sports, there were not separate University Division and College Division championships for indoor track and field until 1985. As such, all athletes and teams from University and College Division programs were eligible to compete.

== Team standings ==
- Note: Top 10 only
- ^{(DC)} = Defending Champions
- Full results

Rank	Team	Points
1st place, gold medalist(s)	USC	19
2nd place, silver medalist(s)	Bowling Green State; Michigan State	18
4	Villanova ^{(DC)}	13
5	Kent State; Nebraska	10
7	Adelphi; Illinois; Middle Tennessee State; UTEP	8
