= 1939 NCAA track and field championships =

1939 NCAA Track and Field Championships
- Team Champion: USC (8th title)
- Edition: 18th
- Dates: June 16-17, 1939
- Host city: Los Angeles, California
- Venue: Los Angeles Memorial Coliseum
- Events: 14

The 1939 NCAA Track and Field Championships was the 18th NCAA track and field championship. The event was held at the University of Southern California's Los Angeles Memorial Coliseum in June 1939. The University of Southern California won its fifth consecutive team title.

The individual high scorers at the meet were William Watson of Michigan, who scored in three events, and double hurdles champion Fred Wolcott of Rice. Both finished with 20 points.

Additionally, the NCAA hosted the first ever separate cross country national championships during the 1938–39 season. The 1938 NCAA Men's Cross Country Championships were held in November 1938 in East Lansing, Michigan; Indiana won the team event and Greg Rice, from Notre Dame, won the individual event.

== Team scoring ==
Rank	Team	Points
1st place, gold medalist(s)	Southern California	86
2nd place, silver medalist(s)	Stanford	44 1/2
3rd place, bronze medalist(s)	Michigan	31
4	Washington State	24
5	Wisconsin	22
6	Rice Institute	20
7	Kansas State	18
8	Oregon	16

== Track events ==
100-yard dash
1. Mozel Ellerbe, Tuskegee - 9.8 seconds
2. Clyde Jeffrey, Stanford
3. Willis, USC
4. Jordan, USC
5. Ledford, Washington State

120-yard high hurdles
1. Fred Wolcott, Rice - 14.2 seconds
2. Smith, Wisconsin
3. Corpening, North Carolina
4. Wright, Oklahoma A&M
5. Kinzle, Duke
6. Gatewood, Texas

220-yard dash
1. Clyde Jeffrey, Stanford - 21.1 seconds
2. Ledford, Washington State
3. Pettichord, Washington State
4. Jordan, USC
5. Ohl, Pitt

220-yard low hurdles
1. Fred Wolcott, Rice - 23 seconds
2. Earl Vickery, USC
3. Cochran, Indiana
4. Marshall, Butler
5. Hawkins, Stanford

440-yard dash
1. Erwin Miller, USC - 47.5 seconds
2. Watts, California
3. Simmons, Nebraska
4. Upton, USC
5. Breidenbach, Michigan

880-yard run
1. John Woodruff, Pitt - 1:51.3
2. Giddings, NYU
3. Dale, Washington State
4. Moore, Stanford
5. Storli, Oregon

One-mile run
1. Louis Zamperini, USC - 4:13.6
2. Walter Mehl, Wisconsin
3. John Munski, Missouri
4. Holderman, Purdue
5. Girard, Stanford

Two-mile run
1.Gregory Rice, Notre Dame - 9:02.6 (NCAA record)
2. Ralph Schwarzkopf, Michigan
3. Efaw, Oklahoma A&M
4. Dodds, Ashland
5. Garner, Washington State

== Field events ==
Broad jump
1. Judson Atchison, Texas - 24 feet 9 1/4 inches (7.550 m)
2. Billy Brown, LSU - 24 feet 8 inches (7.52 m)
3. Turner, UCLA - 24 feet 5 1/2 inches (7.455 m)
4. William Watson, Michigan - 24 feet 1/2 inch (7.328 m)
5. Manuel, California - 24 feet

High jump
1. Johnny Wilson, USC - 6 feet 6 inches (1.98 m)
2. Mallery, USC
2. Diefenthaler, Illinois
4. Burke, Marquette
4. Arrington, Michigan State
4. Lincoln, Stanford
4. Du Fresne, Oregon State

Pole vault
1. Ganslen, Columbia - 14 feet 5 inches (4.39 m)
2. Day, USC
2. Padway, Wisconsin
2. Varoff, Oregon

Discus throw
1. Pete Zagar, Stanford - 164 feet 1/4 inch (49.994 m)
2. William Watson, Michigan - 161 feet 9 3/4 inches (49.320 m)
3. Harris, Indiana
4. White, Tulane
5. Faymonville, Notre Dame

Javelin
1. Bob Peoples, USC - 220 feet 6 1/2 inches (67.221 m)
2. Boyd Brown, Oregon
3. DeGroot, USC
4. Vukmanic, Penn
5. Graham, Texas

Shot put
1. Elmer Hackney, Kansas State - 55 feet 10 3/8 inches (17.028 m) (NCAA and American record)
2. William Watson, Michigan - 54 feet 6 1/2 inches (16.624 m)
3. Lilburn Williams, Xavier New Orleans - 53 feet 11 3/4 inches (16.453 m)
4. Andersen, Stanford
5. Wohl, Stanford

== See also ==
- NCAA Men's Outdoor Track and Field Championship
- 1938 NCAA Men's Cross Country Championships
