= Temi Ojora =

British athlete

Personal information
- Nationality: British
- Born: Temitope Ojara; 24 January 2002 (age 24)

Sport
- Sport: Athletics
- Event: Triple jump

Achievements and titles
- Personal best(s): Triple jump: 13.90m (Fayetteville, 2024); Long jump: 6.37m (Gainesville, 2023)

Temi Ojora (born 24 January 2002) is a British track and field athlete who competes in the triple jump.

== Early life ==
Ojora was schooled at Wycombe Abbey in Buckinghamshire, before later attending the University of Southern California in the United States.

== Career ==
She is a member of Wycombe Abbey & Windsor Slough Eton & Hounslow Athletics Club. She won the 2017 and 2018 English Schools Championships in the high jump. She won the England U20 high jump title in 2019 with a personal best of 1.80 metres, in Bedford.

In her freshman year competing for the USC Trojans she finished in eighth place in the triple jump at the 2021 NCAA Outdoors Championships, as the Trojan women won the national title. She competed in Tallinn at the 2021 European Athletics U20 Championships and finished fourth in the triple jump.

She equalled her triple jump personal best of 13.66m to finish sixth at the 2023 NCAA Championships. She finished second at the 2023 British Athletics Championships in July 2023 in Manchester. She subsequently competed in Espoo at the 2023 European Athletics U23 Championships.

In May 2024, she set a new personal best of 13.90 metres in Fayetteville, Arkansas. She finished second at the 2024 British Athletics Championships in Manchester with a distance of 13.26 metres.

In March 2025, she finished third at the 2025 NCAA Indoor Championships with a jump of 13.70 metres.

== Personal life ==
Born to Nigerian parents Ngozi and Adeyinka Ojora, her brother Tade Ojora is also an international athlete. Their ancestry is in the Ojora Royal Family of Lagos.
