= Trey Henderson =

Canadian gridiron football player and hammer thrower

Nolan "Trey" Henderson (born 10 October 1989 in Vancouver, British Columbia) is an American football defensive end turned full-time hammer thrower. He played collegiately for the University of Southern California Trojans and graduated from USC in 2012.

In high school, at Vancouver College he played a number of positions both on the offensive and defensive side of the ball. Henderson injured his knees during his freshman season as a Trojan, and opted to change sports from football to track where he was a two-time All American. He was former star in track and field at his high school. In track, Trey set the Canadian youth record in the hammer with a throw of 221-0 (67.36m) and was the 2005 BC Junior champion, BC Juvenile champion and Canadian Junior silver medalist.

Since 2018, Henderson has been defensive line coach as well as the head coach with the Pacific Lutheran University track & field program.
