= Johnnie Blockburger =

American sprinter (born 2002)

Personal information
- Nationality: United States
- Born: 12 July 2002 (age 24)

Sport
- Sport: Athletics
- Event: Sprint

Achievements and titles
- Personal bests: 200m: 20.34 (Albuquerque, 2025); 400m: 44.51 (Boulder, 2024)
Medal record
Men's athletics
Representing the United States
World Relays
Gold medal – first place	2025 Guangzhou	4×400 m mixed

Johnnie Blockburger (born 12 July 2002) is an American sprinter.

== Early and personal life ==
From Arizona, he attended Tucson High School. His personal best for the 400 metres whilst at Tucson was 48.02 seconds as a junior in 2019, but his track season was practically non-existent in 2020 because of the COVID-19 pandemic. His twin sister Alyssa Blockburger is also a college athlete who competes in middle-distance running. Their father, Sheldon Blockburger competed in decathlon, was a coach at the University of Arizona for ten seasons prior to being an assistant coach for the USC Trojans from 2016 to 2018.

== Career ==
=== NCAA ===
He spent a year at the University of Arizona in 2020-21 where he won the Pac-12 400 metres race with a time of 45.57 seconds, and ran a personal best time of 44.71 seconds at the Jim Click Shootout on April 10 which ranked him as No. 4 on the career U.S. Junior List behind only Steve Lewis, LaShawn Merritt and Darrell Robinson and made him the first member of the Arizona Wildcats to run under 45 seconds, breaking the school record set in 2008. He was subsequently named PAC-12 freshman of the year, before transferring to the University of Southern California.

In 2024, Blockburger was named the Pac-12 Men’s Athlete of the Year, winning the 200 metres and 400 metres race at the conference championship meeting. He finished fourth in the 400 metres at the 2024 NCAA outdoor championships, and lowered his personal best time to 44.51 seconds that year at the Pac-12 final in Boulder, Colorado.

Competing at the New Mexico Collegiate Classic in Albuquerque in February 2025, he setting new indoor personal best in the 200 metres with a time of 20.34 seconds. In March 2025, he was a member of the University of Southern California team which won the overall 2025 Division I men's indoor track and field title Virginia Beach, their first for 53 years.

=== Professional career ===
On 24 April 2025, he was named in the American team for the 2025 World Athletics Relays in Guangzhou, China in May 2025. He was a member of the mixed 4x400 metres relay team along with Courtney Okolo, Chris Robinson, and Lynna Irby-Jackson that won their heat to qualify an American team for the 2025 World Championship, and doing so by running world-leading time. In the final the quartet won the gold medal and broke the championship record to win in 3:09.54. Later that month, he finished sixth in the 400 metres at the 2025 Meeting International Mohammed VI d'Athlétisme de Rabat, part of the 2025 Diamond League.
