= Noah Bryant =

American shot putter

Personal information
- Born: May 11, 1984 (age 42)
- Height: 6 ft 1 in (1.85 m)

Sport
- Country: United States
- Event(s): Shot put, Hammer
- College team: USC Trojans
- Turned pro: 2007

Achievements and titles
- Personal best: Shot put: 20.80 Hammer: 61.73
Medal record
Men's athletics
Representing the United States
Pan American Junior Athletics Championships
Silver medal – second place	2003 Barbados	Shot Put

Noah Jacob Bryant (born May 11, 1984, in Santa Barbara, California) is an American shot putter. He attended high school at Carpinteria High School in Carpinteria, CA. He won the 2002 CIF California State Meet, defeating Adam Tafralis, son of Olympian Gregg Tafralis.

== NCAA ==
He then went on to the University of Southern California where he won both the indoor and outdoor NCAA Championships in 2007. Bryant also competed at the 2007 World Championships in Athletics in Osaka, Japan. His NCAA history is that much more impressive after Bryant lost most of his sophomore season and needed to go through reconstructive surgery after a freak hammer throw accident when the implement bounced off the protective screen and back into his face. While at USC, Bryant set the school record in the shot put with a throw of 20.56 meters.

== Professional ==
Bryant finished in fourth place at the USA Outdoor Track and Field Championships in 2007 and 6th in 2009.
