= Tade Ojora =

British hurdler (born 1999)

Personal information
- Nationality: British (English)
- Born: 14 October 1999 (age 26) London, England
- Years active: 2019–present

Sport
- Sport: Athletics
- Event: 110 metres hurdles
- College team: USC Trojans
- Club: Windsor, Slough, Eton and Hounslow Athletic Club
Medal record
British Athletics Championships
Gold medal – first place	2021 Manchester	110 m hurdes
Gold medal – first place	2022 Manchester	110 m hurdes
Gold medal – first place	2023 Manchester	110 m hurdes
Gold medal – first place	2025 Birmingham	110 m hurdles
British Indoor Athletics Championships
Gold medal – first place	2024 Birmingham	60m hurdles

Omotade Ojora (born 14 October 1999) is an athlete who represents Great Britain and Northern Ireland at hurdling. He has won the 110 metres hurdles events at the 2021, 2022, 2023 and 2025 UK Athletics Championships and the 60 metre hurdles at the 2024 British Indoor Athletics Championships. He has competed in US college athletics for USC Trojans, achieving National Collegiate Athletic Association All-American honours three times. He competed at the 2024 Summer Olympics.

== Early life ==
Ojora was born in London, England, on 14 October 1999. His ancestry is in the Ojora Family of Lagos. Ojora grew up in Nigeria and from the age of 8 went to school in England attending Summer Fields School and Eton College. In 2015, he came third in the 100 metres hurdles event at the English Schools' Athletic Association's National Championships. In 2018, he came second in the 110 metres hurdles event at the same championships. At Eton, he also played association football and rugby union. His sister Temi is a triple jumper. From 2019, Ojora attended the University of Southern California.

== College career ==
Ojora started competing for USC Trojans in 2019, and won his first two races for USC. That year, he came second in the Pac-12 Conference Championship. He won the 110 metres hurdles events at the 2019 and 2021 USC-UCLA Dual Meet, and set the USC record holder for a freshman in the event. At the 2022 NCAA Division I Outdoor Track and Field Championships, Ojora came eighth in the 110 metres hurdles event. He has received the National Collegiate Athletic Association All-American honours in 2021, 2022 and 2023, and came fourth in the 110 metres event at the 2023 NCAA Division I Outdoor Track and Field Championships.

== International career ==
In the United Kingdom, Ojora competes for the Windsor, Slough, Eton and Hounslow Athletic Club. Ojora became the British 110 metres hurdles champion after winning the event at the 2021 British Athletics Championships, in a time of 13.38 seconds, which was slower than the qualification time for the delayed 2020 Summer Olympics. He was a surprise winner, as Andrew Pozzi was the favourite for the event. He was not given an Olympic wildcard place, with David King being selected instead. King had a higher world ranking, as NCAA events do not count for World Athletics ranking points. Later in 2021, he won the 110 metres hurdles event at the National Athletics League meeting in London. At the 2021 European Athletics U23 Championships, Ojora finished fourth in the final of the 110 metres hurdles, narrowly behind third placed finisher Enrique Llopis.

In 2022, Ojora defended his British title at the 2022 British Athletics Championships, in a time of 13.27 seconds. The race was run with a significant tail wind, and so Ojura could not use the time to qualify for the 2022 World Athletics Championships, and his world ranking meant that he did not qualify for the championships. Ojora was selected for the 110 metres hurdles event at the 2022 Commonwealth Games; it was his first international competition. He was eliminated in the first round.

Ojora won his third 110 metres title at the 2023 British Athletics Championships. He was selected to represent Great Britain at the 2024 Summer Olympics where he went out in the semi-finals.

He won a fourth British outdoor title at the 2025 UK Athletics Championships.
