= Minnesota Golden Gophers track and field =

College track and field team

- University: University of Minnesota
- Head coach: Matt Bingle
- Conference: Big Ten
- Location: St. Paul, Minnesota
- Outdoor track: University of Minnesota Track & Field Stadium
- Nickname: Golden Gophers
- Colors: Maroon and gold

NCAA Outdoor National Championships
- Men: 1948

The Minnesota Golden Gophers track and field team is the track and field program that represents University of Minnesota. The Golden Gophers compete in NCAA Division I as a member of the Big Ten Conference. The team is based in St. Paul, Minnesota at the University of Minnesota Track & Field Stadium.

The program is coached by Matt Bingle. The track and field program officially encompasses four teams because the NCAA considers men's and women's indoor track and field and outdoor track and field as separate sports.

Discus thrower Fortune Gordien has won the most NCAA titles of any Golden Gopher athlete, with three from 1946 to 1948. Minnesota won its only national team title at the men's 1948 NCAA track and field championships.

== Postseason ==
=== AIAW ===
The Golden Gophers have had 5 AIAW All-Americans finishing in the top six at the AIAW indoor or outdoor championships.

AIAW All-Americans
Championships	Name	Event	Place
1970 Outdoor	Kathleen Pratt	880 yards	4th
1970 Outdoor	Kathleen Pratt	Mile run	3rd
1974 Outdoor	Jane Oas	440 yards	4th
1976 Outdoor	Jane Oas	200 meters	5th
1976 Outdoor	Jane Oas	400 meters	4th
1976 Outdoor	Cathie Twomey	1500 meters	6th
1978 Indoor	Cynthia Cox	880 yards	6th
1978 Indoor	Cathie Twomey	Mile run	1st
1978 Indoor	Cathie Twomey	2 miles	6th
1980 Indoor	Rocky Racette	5000 meters	3rd

=== NCAA ===
As of 2024, a total of 114 men and 37 women have achieved individual first-team All-American status at the Division I men's outdoor, women's outdoor, men's indoor, or women's indoor national championships (using the modern criteria of top-8 placing regardless of athlete nationality).

First team NCAA All-Americans
Team	Championships	Name	Event	Place	Ref.
Men's	1921 Outdoor	Karl Anderson	110 meters hurdles	3rd	
Men's	1921 Outdoor	Mearl Sweitzer	Mile run	3rd	
Men's	1922 Outdoor	Sam Campbell	High jump	5th	
Men's	1922 Outdoor	Lou Gross	Discus throw	3rd	
Men's	1923 Outdoor	Lou Gross	Shot put	5th	
Men's	1923 Outdoor	Lou Gross	Discus throw	5th	
Men's	1923 Outdoor	Carl Schjoll	Javelin throw	4th	
Men's	1925 Outdoor	Tex Cox	Hammer throw	2nd	
Men's	1927 Outdoor	George Otterness	110 meters hurdles	5th	
Men's	1928 Outdoor	Elton Hess	Pole vault	4th	
Men's	1928 Outdoor	George MacKinnon	Javelin throw	5th	
Men's	1931 Outdoor	Chuck Scheifley	110 meters hurdles	5th	
Men's	1931 Outdoor	Cam Hackle	High jump	6th	
Men's	1931 Outdoor	Biggie Munn	Shot put	4th	
Men's	1932 Outdoor	Chuck Scheifley	220 yards hurdles	3rd	
Men's	1932 Outdoor	Harold Thornton	100 meters	5th	
Men's	1932 Outdoor	Harold Thornton	200 meters	4th	
Men's	1932 Outdoor	John Currell	3000 meters	4th	
Men's	1932 Outdoor	Elton Hess	Pole vault	2nd	
Men's	1932 Outdoor	Biggie Munn	Shot put	2nd	
Men's	1935 Outdoor	Wayne Slocum	3000 meters	4th	
Men's	1937 Outdoor	Bob Hubbard	Long jump	4th	
Men's	1939 Outdoor	Welles Hodgson	Long jump	8th	
Men's	1940 Outdoor	Welles Hodgson	Long jump	3rd	
Men's	1941 Outdoor	Jack Defield	Pole vault	3rd	
Men's	1941 Outdoor	Bob Fitch	Discus throw	4th	
Men's	1942 Outdoor	Jack Defield	Pole vault	1st	
Men's	1942 Outdoor	Bob Fitch	Discus throw	1st	
Men's	1943 Outdoor	Frank Adams	220 yards hurdles	5th	
Men's	1943 Outdoor	Richard Kelley	100 meters	4th	
Men's	1943 Outdoor	Ralph Pohland	800 meters	3rd	
Men's	1943 Outdoor	Floyd Foslien	3000 meters	6th	
Men's	1943 Outdoor	Jack Defield	Pole vault	1st	
Men's	1943 Outdoor	Fortune Gordien	Discus throw	2nd	
Men's	1944 Outdoor	Mark Brownstein	100 meters	3rd	
Men's	1944 Outdoor	Armin Baumann	High jump	3rd	
Men's	1945 Outdoor	Ray Tharp	220 yards hurdles	6th	
Men's	1946 Outdoor	Harry Cooper	Pole vault	4th	
Men's	1946 Outdoor	Ray Tharp	Long jump	7th	
Men's	1946 Outdoor	Fortune Gordien	Shot put	5th	
Men's	1946 Outdoor	Bob Novotny	Shot put	7th	
Men's	1946 Outdoor	Fortune Gordien	Discus throw	1st	
Men's	1947 Outdoor	Lloyd Lamois	Long jump	3rd	
Men's	1947 Outdoor	Fortune Gordien	Shot put	3rd	
Men's	1947 Outdoor	Fortune Gordien	Discus throw	1st	
Men's	1948 Outdoor	Lee Hofacre	400 meters hurdles	5th	
Men's	1948 Outdoor	Roy Good	3000 meters steeplechase	5th	
Men's	1948 Outdoor	Dick Kilty	10,000 meters	3rd	
Men's	1948 Outdoor	Harry Cooper	Pole vault	3rd	
Men's	1948 Outdoor	Lloyd Lamois	Long jump	6th	
Men's	1948 Outdoor	Lloyd Lamois	Triple jump	1st	
Men's	1948 Outdoor	Fortune Gordien	Shot put	2nd	
Men's	1948 Outdoor	Fortune Gordien	Discus throw	1st	
Men's	1948 Outdoor	Charles Lindekugel	Hammer throw	6th	
Men's	1948 Outdoor	Leo Nomellini	Hammer throw	7th	
Men's	1949 Outdoor	Byrl Thompson	Discus throw	2nd	
Men's	1950 Outdoor	Jim Nielsen	220 yards hurdles	7th	
Men's	1950 Outdoor	Dick Kilty	3000 meters	7th	
Men's	1950 Outdoor	Byrl Thompson	Shot put	5th	
Men's	1950 Outdoor	Byrl Thompson	Discus throw	5th	
Men's	1951 Outdoor	Jack Carroll	Pole vault	6th	
Men's	1951 Outdoor	George Holm	Discus throw	6th	
Men's	1954 Outdoor	Gerry Helgeson	Discus throw	7th	
Men's	1955 Outdoor	Harry Nash	100 meters	4th	
Men's	1955 Outdoor	Bill Garner	100 meters	8th	
Men's	1955 Outdoor	Gerry Helgeson	Discus throw	8th	
Men's	1956 Outdoor	Byrl Thompson	Shot put	6th	
Men's	1956 Outdoor	Byrl Thompson	Discus throw	7th	
Men's	1956 Outdoor	Dale Yonkey	Discus throw	8th	
Men's	1957 Outdoor	Buddy Edelen	3000 meters	5th	
Men's	1957 Outdoor	Bob Henry	Shot put	3rd	
Men's	1958 Outdoor	Bob Henry	Shot put	3rd	
Men's	1960 Outdoor	Dave Odegard	110 meters hurdles	2nd	
Men's	1965 Outdoor	Tom Heinonen	10,000 meters	6th	
Men's	1966 Indoor	Tom Heinonen	3000 meters	5th	
Men's	1966 Outdoor	Tom Heinonen	5000 meters	5th	
Men's	1966 Outdoor	Tom Heinonen	10,000 meters	7th	
Men's	1967 Outdoor	Tom Heinonen	5000 meters	5th	
Men's	1967 Outdoor	Tom Heinonen	10,000 meters	3rd	
Men's	1968 Outdoor	John Warford	110 meters hurdles	8th	
Men's	1968 Outdoor	Steve Hoag	10,000 meters	3rd	
Men's	1968 Outdoor	Richard Simonsen	4 × 100 meters relay	6th	
Men's	1968 Outdoor	Randy Jones	4 × 100 meters relay	6th	
Men's	1968 Outdoor	Pete Shea	4 × 100 meters relay	6th	
Men's	1968 Outdoor	Hubie Bryant	4 × 100 meters relay	6th	
Men's	1969 Outdoor	Tim Heikkila	High jump	6th	
Men's	1970 Indoor	Garry Bjorkund	3000 meters	4th	
Men's	1970 Indoor	Tim Heikkila	High jump	4th	
Men's	1970 Outdoor	Don Timm	3000 meters steeplechase	7th	
Men's	1970 Outdoor	Garry Bjorklund	5000 meters	2nd	
Men's	1971 Indoor	Brad Buetow	High jump	5th	
Men's	1971 Outdoor	Don Timm	3000 meters steeplechase	4th	
Men's	1971 Outdoor	Garry Bjorklund	10,000 meters	1st	
Men's	1971 Outdoor	Tim Heikkila	High jump	2nd	
Men's	1972 Indoor	Colin Anderson	Shot put	5th	
Men's	1972 Outdoor	Colin Anderson	Shot put	6th	
Men's	1973 Outdoor	Dennis Fee	10,000 meters	6th	
Men's	1973 Outdoor	Colin Anderson	Shot put	8th	
Men's	1976 Outdoor	Steve Plasencia	5000 meters	5th	
Men's	1977 Outdoor	Steve Plasencia	5000 meters	7th	
Men's	1978 Outdoor	Gerald Metzler	1500 meters	8th	
Men's	1980 Outdoor	Dan Heikkinen	3000 meters steeplechase	6th	
Men's	1982 Outdoor	John Idstrom	10,000 meters	7th	
Men's	1982 Outdoor	Lloyd Ness	10,000 meters	8th	
Women's	1983 Indoor	Jody Eder	1000 meters	5th	
Women's	1983 Indoor	Kristin Rens	4 × 800 meters relay	3rd	
Women's	1983 Indoor	Cathy Gorecki	4 × 800 meters relay	3rd	
Women's	1983 Indoor	Ann Lundin	4 × 800 meters relay	3rd	
Women's	1983 Indoor	Jody Eder	4 × 800 meters relay	3rd	
Women's	1984 Indoor	Jody Eder	1000 meters	4th	
Men's	1984 Outdoor	Ron Backes	Shot put	4th	
Women's	1984 Outdoor	Jody Eder	3000 meters	6th	
Men's	1985 Indoor	Ron Backes	Shot put	5th	
Men's	1985 Outdoor	Dave Morrison	10,000 meters	6th	
Men's	1985 Outdoor	Ron Backes	Shot put	8th	
Women's	1985 Outdoor	Becky Fettig	Discus throw	8th	
Men's	1986 Indoor	Ron Backes	Shot put	1st	
Men's	1986 Outdoor	Ron Backes	Shot put	3rd	
Women's	1988 Outdoor	Eileen Donaghy	10,000 meters	8th	
Women's	1989 Outdoor	Rachel Lewis	Discus throw	5th	
Women's	1990 Indoor	Rachel Lewis	Shot put	2nd	
Men's	1990 Outdoor	Carson Hoeft	1500 meters	7th	
Women's	1990 Outdoor	Rachel Lewis	Discus throw	2nd	
Women's	1990 Outdoor	Jean Schleusener	Discus throw	5th	
Women's	1991 Indoor	Rachel Lewis	Shot put	6th	
Men's	1991 Outdoor	Chris Murrell	High jump	8th	
Women's	1991 Outdoor	Rachel Lewis	Discus throw	3rd	
Women's	1991 Outdoor	Decia Agnew	Javelin throw	4th	
Men's	1993 Indoor	Chris Murrell	High jump	2nd	
Men's	1993 Indoor	Martin Eriksson	Pole vault	1st	
Men's	1993 Outdoor	Martin Eriksson	Pole vault	3rd	
Women's	1993 Outdoor	Heather Berlin	Javelin throw	3rd	
Men's	1994 Indoor	Martin Eriksson	Pole vault	6th	
Men's	1995 Indoor	Keita Cline	Triple jump	8th	
Women's	1995 Indoor	Lori Townsend	3000 meters	6th	
Men's	1995 Outdoor	Tye Harvey	Pole vault	8th	
Men's	1995 Outdoor	Keita Cline	Long jump	8th	
Men's	1995 Outdoor	Chris Brinkworth	Shot put	6th	
Men's	1995 Outdoor	Chris Brinkworth	Discus throw	5th	
Women's	1995 Outdoor	Lori Townsend	5000 meters	6th	
Women's	1995 Outdoor	Heather Berlin	Javelin throw	2nd	
Men's	1996 Indoor	Vesa Rantanen	Pole vault	8th	
Men's	1996 Outdoor	Paul Michalek	1500 meters	6th	
Women's	1996 Outdoor	Andrea Grove-McDonough	1500 meters	5th	
Women's	1996 Outdoor	Tanya Simonsen	Javelin throw	2nd	
Men's	1997 Indoor	Staffan Strand	High jump	2nd	
Men's	1997 Indoor	Tye Harvey	Pole vault	2nd	
Men's	1997 Outdoor	Staffan Strand	High jump	2nd	
Men's	1997 Outdoor	Vesa Rantanen	Pole vault	6th	
Men's	1997 Outdoor	Jason Schlueter	Discus throw	6th	
Men's	1997 Outdoor	Christer Hagberg	Discus throw	7th	
Men's	1997 Outdoor	Benjamin Jensen	Decathlon	3rd	
Men's	1998 Indoor	Staffan Strand	High jump	4th	
Men's	1998 Indoor	Vesa Rantanen	Pole vault	1st	
Men's	1998 Outdoor	Staffan Strand	High jump	3rd	
Men's	1998 Outdoor	Tye Harvey	Pole vault	8th	
Women's	1998 Outdoor	Nicole Chimko	Javelin throw	3rd	
Women's	1999 Indoor	Aubrey Schmitt	Shot put	2nd	
Men's	1999 Outdoor	Staffan Strand	High jump	2nd	
Women's	1999 Outdoor	Nicole Chimko	Discus throw	7th	
Women's	1999 Outdoor	Linda Lindqvist	Javelin throw	3rd	
Women's	2000 Indoor	Aubrey Schmitt	Shot put	7th	
Women's	2000 Outdoor	Aubrey Schmitt	Shot put	6th	
Men's	2001 Indoor	Mitch Potter	400 meters	7th	
Men's	2001 Indoor	Mitch Potter	4 × 400 meters relay	8th	
Men's	2001 Indoor	Adam Steele	4 × 400 meters relay	8th	
Men's	2001 Indoor	Mikael Jakobsson	4 × 400 meters relay	8th	
Men's	2001 Indoor	Tom Gerding	4 × 400 meters relay	8th	
Men's	2001 Indoor	Marc Johannsen	High jump	6th	
Men's	2001 Outdoor	Tom Gerding	400 meters	6th	
Men's	2001 Outdoor	Mitch Potter	4 × 400 meters relay	5th	
Men's	2001 Outdoor	Andy Wohlin	4 × 400 meters relay	5th	
Men's	2001 Outdoor	Mikael Jakobsson	4 × 400 meters relay	5th	
Men's	2001 Outdoor	Tom Gerding	4 × 400 meters relay	5th	
Women's	2001 Outdoor	Aubrey Schmitt	Discus throw	6th	
Men's	2002 Indoor	Mikael Jakobson	4 × 400 meters relay	4th	
Men's	2002 Indoor	Andy Wohlin	4 × 400 meters relay	4th	
Men's	2002 Indoor	Adam Steele	4 × 400 meters relay	4th	
Men's	2002 Indoor	Mitch Potter	4 × 400 meters relay	4th	
Men's	2002 Indoor	Toby Henkels	Distance medley relay	6th	
Men's	2002 Indoor	Bob Quade	Distance medley relay	6th	
Men's	2002 Indoor	Ryan Ford	Distance medley relay	6th	
Men's	2002 Indoor	Andy McKessock	Distance medley relay	6th	
Women's	2002 Indoor	Tahesia Harrigan	60 meters	2nd	
Men's	2002 Outdoor	Mikael Jakobsson	400 meters hurdles	5th	
Women's	2002 Outdoor	Barbora Spotakova	Javelin throw	5th	
Men's	2003 Indoor	Mitch Potter	400 meters	5th	
Men's	2003 Indoor	Toby Henkels	800 meters	4th	
Men's	2003 Indoor	Mikael Jakobson	4 × 400 meters relay	4th	
Men's	2003 Indoor	Andy Wohlin	4 × 400 meters relay	4th	
Men's	2003 Indoor	Adam Steele	4 × 400 meters relay	4th	
Men's	2003 Indoor	Mitch Potter	4 × 400 meters relay	4th	
Men's	2003 Indoor	Neil Hanson	Distance medley relay	6th	
Men's	2003 Indoor	Adam Steele	Distance medley relay	6th	
Men's	2003 Indoor	Toby Henkels	Distance medley relay	6th	
Men's	2003 Indoor	Martin Robeck	Distance medley relay	6th	
Men's	2003 Indoor	Karl Erickson	Shot put	5th	
Women's	2003 Indoor	Shani Marks	Triple jump	6th	
Men's	2003 Outdoor	Adam Steele	400 meters	1st	
Men's	2003 Outdoor	Mitch Potter	400 meters	3rd	
Men's	2003 Outdoor	Mitch Potter	400 meters	3rd	
Men's	2003 Outdoor	Martin Robeck	1500 meters	8th	
Men's	2003 Outdoor	Adam Steele	4 × 400 meters relay	2nd	
Men's	2003 Outdoor	Andy Wohlin	4 × 400 meters relay	2nd	
Men's	2003 Outdoor	Mikael Jakobsson	4 × 400 meters relay	2nd	
Men's	2003 Outdoor	Mitch Potter	4 × 400 meters relay	2nd	
Men's	2003 Outdoor	Karl Erickson	Shot put	5th	
Women's	2003 Outdoor	Stephanie Linz	High jump	7th	
Women's	2003 Outdoor	Shani Marks	Triple jump	2nd	
Men's	2004 Indoor	Robb Merritt	4 × 400 meters relay	2nd	
Men's	2004 Indoor	Mikael Jakobsson	4 × 400 meters relay	2nd	
Men's	2004 Indoor	Adam Steele	4 × 400 meters relay	2nd	
Men's	2004 Indoor	Mitch Potter	4 × 400 meters relay	2nd	
Men's	2004 Indoor	Ben Hanson	Distance medley relay	5th	
Men's	2004 Indoor	Adam Steele	Distance medley relay	5th	
Men's	2004 Indoor	Lynden Reder	Distance medley relay	5th	
Men's	2004 Indoor	Martin Robeck	Distance medley relay	5th	
Men's	2004 Indoor	John Albert	High jump	7th	
Men's	2004 Indoor	Lynden Reder	Weight throw	8th	
Men's	2004 Outdoor	Adam Steele	4 × 400 meters relay	2nd	
Men's	2004 Outdoor	Robb Merritt	4 × 400 meters relay	2nd	
Men's	2004 Outdoor	Aaron Buzard	4 × 400 meters relay	2nd	
Men's	2004 Outdoor	Mitch Potter	4 × 400 meters relay	2nd	
Men's	2004 Outdoor	Kevin Netzer	High jump	8th	
Men's	2004 Outdoor	Karl Erickson	Discus throw	5th	
Men's	2004 Outdoor	Travis Brandstatter	Decathlon	4th	
Men's	2005 Indoor	Travis Brandstatter	Heptathlon	4th	
Men's	2005 Outdoor	Travis Brandstatter	Decathlon	8th	
Men's	2006 Indoor	Aaron Buzard	400 meters	4th	
Men's	2006 Indoor	Karl Erickson	Shot put	6th	
Women's	2006 Indoor	Heather Dorniden	800 meters	1st	
Women's	2006 Indoor	Jamie Cheever	Distance medley relay	3rd	
Women's	2006 Indoor	Kadian Douglas	Distance medley relay	3rd	
Women's	2006 Indoor	Heather Dorniden	Distance medley relay	3rd	
Women's	2006 Indoor	Emily Brown	Distance medley relay	3rd	
Women's	2006 Indoor	Liz Roehrig	Pentathlon	6th	
Men's	2006 Outdoor	Aaron Buzard	400 meters	8th	
Men's	2006 Outdoor	Karl Erickson	Shot put	4th	
Men's	2006 Outdoor	Karl Erickson	Discus throw	4th	
Women's	2006 Outdoor	Heather Dorniden	800 meters	2nd	
Women's	2006 Outdoor	Emily Brown	3000 meters steeplechase	4th	
Women's	2006 Outdoor	Liz Roehrig	Heptathlon	8th	
Men's	2007 Indoor	Ibrahim Kabia	60 meters	5th	
Men's	2007 Indoor	Aaron Buzard	400 meters	2nd	
Women's	2007 Indoor	Heather Dorniden	800 meters	3rd	
Women's	2007 Outdoor	Heather Dorniden	800 meters	3rd	
Women's	2008 Indoor	Heather Dorniden	800 meters	2nd	
Women's	2008 Indoor	Alicia Rue	Pole vault	4th	
Women's	2008 Indoor	Liz Roehrig	Pentathlon	6th	
Men's	2008 Outdoor	Hassan Mead	5000 meters	6th	
Women's	2008 Outdoor	Heather Dorniden	800 meters	5th	
Women's	2008 Outdoor	Ruby Radocaj	Javelin throw	6th	
Women's	2008 Outdoor	Liz Roehrig	Heptathlon	2nd	
Men's	2009 Indoor	Hassan Mead	3000 meters	4th	
Men's	2009 Indoor	Chris Rombough	3000 meters	7th	
Men's	2009 Indoor	Aaron Studt	Shot put	2nd	
Women's	2009 Indoor	Heather Dorniden	800 meters	3rd	
Women's	2009 Indoor	Alicia Rue	Pole vault	2nd	
Men's	2009 Outdoor	Hassan Mead	5000 meters	6th	
Men's	2009 Outdoor	Aaron Studt	Shot put	5th	
Women's	2009 Outdoor	Heather Dorniden	800 meters	8th	
Women's	2009 Outdoor	Alicia Rue	Pole vault	3rd	
Women's	2009 Outdoor	Liz Roehrig	Heptathlon	2nd	
Men's	2010 Indoor	Chris Rombough	3000 meters	7th	
Men's	2010 Indoor	Aaron Studt	Shot put	6th	
Men's	2010 Indoor	Aaron Studt	Weight throw	5th	
Men's	2010 Indoor	R.J. McGinnis	Heptathlon	6th	
Women's	2010 Indoor	Megan Duwell	5000 meters	6th	
Women's	2010 Indoor	Samantha Sonnenberg	Pole vault	7th	
Women's	2010 Outdoor	Gabrielle Anderson	1500 meters	2nd	
Men's	2011 Indoor	Harun Abda	800 meters	5th	
Men's	2011 Indoor	Ben Blankenship	3000 meters	2nd	
Men's	2011 Indoor	Nick Hutton	Distance medley relay	3rd	
Men's	2011 Indoor	Harun Abda	Distance medley relay	3rd	
Men's	2011 Indoor	Travis Burkstrand	Distance medley relay	3rd	
Men's	2011 Indoor	Ben Blankenship	Distance medley relay	3rd	
Men's	2011 Indoor	Ben Peterson	Pole vault	2nd	
Men's	2011 Indoor	Micah Hegerle	Weight throw	8th	
Women's	2011 Indoor	Samantha Sonnenberg	Pole vault	7th	
Men's	2012 Indoor	David Pachuta	800 meters	6th	
Men's	2012 Indoor	Hassan Mead	5000 meters	7th	
Men's	2012 Indoor	Kevin Bradley	4 × 400 meters relay	6th	
Men's	2012 Indoor	John Holton	4 × 400 meters relay	6th	
Men's	2012 Indoor	David Pachuta	4 × 400 meters relay	6th	
Men's	2012 Indoor	Harun Abda	4 × 400 meters relay	6th	
Men's	2012 Indoor	Micah Hegerle	Weight throw	7th	
Men's	2012 Outdoor	Hassan Mead	5000 meters	4th	
Men's	2012 Outdoor	Quentin Mege	Hammer throw	5th	
Men's	2012 Outdoor	Micah Hegerle	Hammer throw	7th	
Men's	2013 Indoor	Harun Abda	800 meters	5th	
Men's	2013 Indoor	John Simons	Mile run	5th	
Men's	2013 Indoor	Travis Burkstrand	Distance medley relay	3rd	
Men's	2013 Indoor	Cameron Boy	Distance medley relay	3rd	
Men's	2013 Indoor	Harun Abda	Distance medley relay	3rd	
Men's	2013 Indoor	Nick Hutton	Distance medley relay	3rd	
Men's	2013 Indoor	Jon Lehman	Weight throw	5th	
Men's	2013 Outdoor	Harun Abda	800 meters	4th	
Men's	2013 Outdoor	Travis Burkstrand	800 meters	8th	
Men's	2013 Outdoor	Wally Ellenson	High jump	8th	
Men's	2013 Outdoor	Micah Hegerle	Hammer throw	6th	
Men's	2014 Indoor	John Simons	3000 meters	6th	
Women's	2014 Indoor	Alena Brooks	800 meters	7th	
Men's	2014 Outdoor	John Simons	1500 meters	7th	
Men's	2014 Outdoor	Wally Ellenson	High jump	2nd	
Men's	2014 Outdoor	Zach Siegmeier	Pole vault	5th	
Men's	2015 Indoor	Luca Wieland	Heptathlon	1st	
Women's	2015 Indoor	Jess Lehman	Pentathlon	5th	
Women's	2015 Outdoor	Nicolle Murphy	Javelin throw	6th	
Women's	2015 Outdoor	Jess Lehman	Heptathlon	5th	
Men's	2016 Indoor	Luca Wieland	Heptathlon	5th	
Men's	2016 Outdoor	Sean Donnelly	Hammer throw	4th	
Women's	2016 Outdoor	Lyndsey Thorpe	Hammer throw	6th	
Women's	2016 Outdoor	Nicolle Murphy	Javelin throw	4th	
Men's	2017 Outdoor	Luca Wieland	Decathlon	3rd	
Women's	2018 Indoor	Kiley Sabin	Shot put	5th	
Women's	2018 Indoor	Kaitlyn Long	Weight throw	1st	
Men's	2018 Outdoor	Obsa Ali	3000 meters steeplechase	1st	
Women's	2018 Outdoor	Emma Spagnola	400 meters hurdles	7th	
Men's	2019 Outdoor	Obsa Ali	3000 meters steeplechase	4th	
Women's	2019 Outdoor	Temi Ogunrinde	Hammer throw	5th	
Men's	2021 Indoor	Alec Basten	3000 meters	5th	
Men's	2021 Indoor	Alec Basten	5000 meters	7th	
Men's	2021 Indoor	Kaleb Siekmeier	Weight throw	7th	
Women's	2021 Indoor	Amira Young	200 meters	8th	
Women's	2021 Indoor	Bethany Hasz	5000 meters	2nd	
Men's	2021 Outdoor	Alec Basten	3000 meters steeplechase	2nd	
Men's	2021 Outdoor	Kostas Zaltos	Hammer throw	3rd	
Women's	2021 Outdoor	Bethany Hasz	5000 meters	3rd	
Men's	2022 Outdoor	Alec Basten	3000 meters steeplechase	7th	
Men's	2022 Outdoor	Matthew Wilkinson	3000 meters steeplechase	8th	
Men's	2022 Outdoor	Kaleb Siekmeier	Discus throw	5th	
Men's	2022 Outdoor	Kostas Zaltos	Hammer throw	3rd	
Women's	2022 Outdoor	Shelby Frank	Discus throw	6th	
Women's	2023 Indoor	Nyalaam Jok	High jump	6th	
Women's	2023 Indoor	Shelby Frank	Weight throw	2nd	
Men's	2023 Outdoor	Matthew Wilkinson	3000 meters steeplechase	5th	
Men's	2023 Outdoor	Kostas Zaltos	Hammer throw	2nd	
Men's	2023 Outdoor	Jake Kubiatowicz	Hammer throw	6th	
Women's	2024 Indoor	Shelby Frank	Weight throw	2nd	
Men's	2024 Outdoor	Charles Godfred	Long jump	6th	
Men's	2024 Outdoor	Angelos Mantzouranis	Hammer throw	3rd	
Women's	2024 Outdoor	Shelby Frank	Discus throw	4th	
Women's	2024 Outdoor	Shelby Frank	Hammer throw	7th	

== See also ==
- Category:Minnesota Golden Gophers men's track and field athletes (39)
- Category:Minnesota Golden Gophers women's track and field athletes (8)
