= STMA =

STMA may refer to:

- The reporting mark of the St. Maries River Railroad
- St. Michael-Albertville Schools
  - St. Michael-Albertville High School
