= Corner Bar (St. Michael, Minnesota) =

Coordinates: 45.210012°N 93.664644°W

- Interactive map of Corner Bar

Restaurant information
- Established: 1897
- Closed: January 19, 2020
- Location: 10 Main Street South, St. Michael, Wright, Minnesota, 55376, United States
- Reservations: No

Corner Bar, also known as The Corner, is a bar in St. Michael, Minnesota, in the United States. It was established in 1897, and is currently owned by the Braun family, who has owned the property since 1993.

== Description and history ==
Corner Bar, established in 1897, is located at the corner of 10 Main Street South and the end of Minnesota State Highway 241 in St. Michael, Minnesota. The Braun Family purchased the property in 1993, and has maintained it since. On July 23, 2011, local resident Alexander Tuomisto was involved in a "one punch homicide" at the location, where he claimed self-defense by punching a disgruntled customer in the jaw. The aforementioned customer became unconscious and died some time later. On January 19, 2020, it closed its doors after the property was sold to improve the intersection it is located on.

In April 2014, the family put the bar up for sale, where the owners claimed that it generated approximately $30 thousand in sales and $800 in pull tabs purchases every month.
