= Otsego, Minnesota =

Otsego
- City
- Location of the city of Otsego within Wright County, Minnesota
- Coordinates: 45°16′18″N 93°35′56″W
- Country: United States
- State: Minnesota
- County: Wright
- Founded: 1858
- Incorporated: November 15, 1990

Government
  - Mayor: Jessica Stockamp

Area
  - Total: 30.53 sq mi (79.08 km^{2})
  - Land: 29.61 sq mi (76.69 km^{2})
  - Water: 0.92 sq mi (2.39 km^{2})
- Elevation: 879 ft (268 m)

Population (2020)
  - Total: 19,966
  - Estimate (2026): 25,454
  - Density: 674.3/sq mi (260.35/km^{2})
- Time zone: UTC–6 (Central (CST))
  - Summer (DST): UTC–5 (CDT)
- ZIP codes: 55301, 55362, 55330
- Area code: 763
- FIPS code: 27-49138
- GNIS feature ID: 0649039
- Website: www.otsegomn.gov

Otsego (/ɒtˈsiːɡoʊ/ ot-SEE-goh) is a city in Wright County, Minnesota, United States. It is a northwest suburb within the Minneapolis–Saint Paul metropolitan area. The population was 19,966 at the 2020 census, further growing to 24,525 by 2025. Otsego is the largest city in Wright County, and the 47th largest city in Minnesota. Minnesota State Highway 101 and Interstate 94 serve as the main routes in the city.

== History ==
Otsego first became an organized township in 1858, and was named after Otsego County, New York, where a party of settlers came from. The township incorporated as the city of Otsego in 1990.

== Geography ==
According to the United States Census Bureau, the city has a total area of 30.49 square miles (78.97 km^{2}); 29.56 square miles (76.56 km^{2}) is land and 0.93 square miles (2.41 km^{2}) is water. Otsego is located at the confluence of the Mississippi and Crow Rivers.

Otsego is located approximately 30 miles Northwest of Downtown Minneapolis via I-94.

Nearby places include Albertville, St. Michael, Rogers, Elk River, Dayton, and Monticello.

=== Climate ===
Otsego has a Humid continental climate with cold, snowy winters and hot, humid summers. As is typical in the Upper Midwest. Otsego experiences a full range of precipitation and related weather events, including snow, sleet, ice, rain, thunderstorms, and fog. Temperatures can exceed 100 °F during summer months and fall below 0 °F in winter. Due to an urban heat island effect, Otsego is often a few degrees colder than downtown Minneapolis during the winter months.

== Demographics ==
Historical population
Census	Pop.	Note	%±
1860	320		—
1870	595		85.9%
1880	740		24.4%
1890	819		10.7%
1900	1,105		34.9%
1910	983		−11.0%
1920	1,021		3.9%
1930	1,000		−2.1%
1940	944		−5.6%
1950	916		−3.0%
1960	1,080		17.9%
1970	1,526		41.3%
1980	4,769		212.5%
1990	5,219		9.4%
2000	6,389		22.4%
2010	13,571		112.4%
2020	19,966		47.1%
2025 (est.)	24,525		22.8%
U.S. Decennial Census; 2020 Census

=== 2020 census ===
As of the 2020 census, Otsego had a population of 19,966. The median age was 34.8 years. 31.7% of residents were under the age of 18 and 10.1% of residents were 65 years of age or older. For every 100 females there were 100.2 males, and for every 100 females age 18 and over there were 100.4 males age 18 and over.

86.4% of residents lived in urban areas, while 13.6% lived in rural areas.

There were 6,743 households in Otsego, of which 44.9% had children under the age of 18 living in them. Of all households, 64.3% were married-couple households, 13.1% were households with a male householder and no spouse or partner present, and 15.8% were households with a female householder and no spouse or partner present. About 17.4% of all households were made up of individuals and 6.0% had someone living alone who was 65 years of age or older.

There were 7,103 housing units, of which 5.1% were vacant. The homeowner vacancy rate was 1.9% and the rental vacancy rate was 7.9%.

Racial composition as of the 2020 census
Race	Number	Percent
White	17,384	87.1%
Black or African American	704	3.5%
American Indian and Alaska Native	60	0.3%
Asian	433	2.2%
Native Hawaiian and Other Pacific Islander	7	0.0%
Some other race	312	1.6%
Two or more races	1,066	5.3%
Hispanic or Latino (of any race)	616	3.1%

=== 2010 census ===
As of the census of 2010, there were 13,571 people, 4,736 households, and 3,560 families living in the city. The population density was 459.1 inhabitants per square mile (177.3/km^{2}). There were 5,022 housing units at an average density of 169.9 per square mile (65.6/km^{2}). The racial makeup of the city was 93.2% White, 1.8% African American, 0.4% Native American, 1.8% Asian, 0.1% Pacific Islander, 0.8% from other races, and 1.9% from two or more races. Hispanic or Latino of any race were 2.4% of the population.

There were 4,736 households, of which 44.5% had children under the age of 18 living with them, 62.9% were married couples living together, 7.4% had a female householder with no husband present, 4.9% had a male householder with no wife present, and 24.8% were non-families. 17.9% of all households were made up of individuals, and 2.8% had someone living alone who was 65 years of age or older. The average household size was 2.86 and the average family size was 3.29.

The median age in the city was 31.8 years. 30.9% of residents were under the age of 18; 6.7% were between the ages of 18 and 24; 35.3% were from 25 to 44; 21.5% were from 45 to 64; and 5.7% were 65 years of age or older. The gender makeup of the city was 50.7% male and 49.3% female.

=== 2000 census ===
As of the census of 2000, there were 6,389 people, 2,062 households, and 1,674 families living in the city. The population density was 217.5 inhabitants per square mile (84.0/km^{2}). There were 2,120 housing units at an average density of 72.2 per square mile (27.9/km^{2}). The racial makeup of the city was 97.26% White, 0.25% African American, 0.36% Native American, 0.72% Asian, 0.56% from other races, and 0.85% from two or more races. Hispanic or Latino of any race were 1.27% of the population. 41.0% were of German, 16.1% Norwegian, 7.0% Swedish, 6.9% Irish and 6.1% American ancestry according to Census 2000.

There were 2,062 households, out of which 46.9% had children under the age of 18 living with them, 71.0% were married couples living together, 5.4% had a female householder with no husband present, and 18.8% were non-families. 12.7% of all households were made up of individuals, and 2.6% had someone living alone who was 65 years of age or older. The average household size was 3.10 and the average family size was 3.41.

In the city, the population was spread out, with 32.5% under the age of 18, 7.7% from 18 to 24, 34.2% from 25 to 44, 21.4% from 45 to 64, and 4.2% who were 65 years of age or older. The median age was 32 years. For every 100 females, there were 108.8 males. For every 100 females age 18 and over, there were 109.1 males.

The median income for a household in the city was $57,422, and the median income for a family was $59,319. Males had a median income of $39,568 versus $28,273 for females. The per capita income for the city was $20,209. About 3.1% of families and 3.2% of the population were below the poverty line, including 2.4% of those under age 18 and 13.8% of those age 65 or over.

== Politics ==
Presidential election results

Precinct General Election Results
Year	Republican	Democratic	Third parties
2020	62.3% 7,076	35.5% 4,034	2.2% 257
2016	62.7% 5,289	29.1% 2,453	8.2% 697
2012	60.3% 4.541	37.9% 2,856	1.8% 138
2008	59.0% 3,941	39.3% 2,626	2.7% 111
2004	62.9% 3,272	36.1% 1,874	1.0% 52
2000	56.5% 1,720	37.9% 1,155	5.6% 172
1996	36.8% 934	45.6% 1,155	17.6% 446
1992	31.3% 759	35.7% 866	33.0% 802

== Education ==
A portion of the city is in the St. Michael-Albertville Schools district., The majority of the City is In the Elk River/Rogers, Minnesota School District. The far western side of Otsego is in the Monticello School District.

Rogers High School serves the community.
