= St. Michael, Minnesota =

City in Minnesota, United States

- City
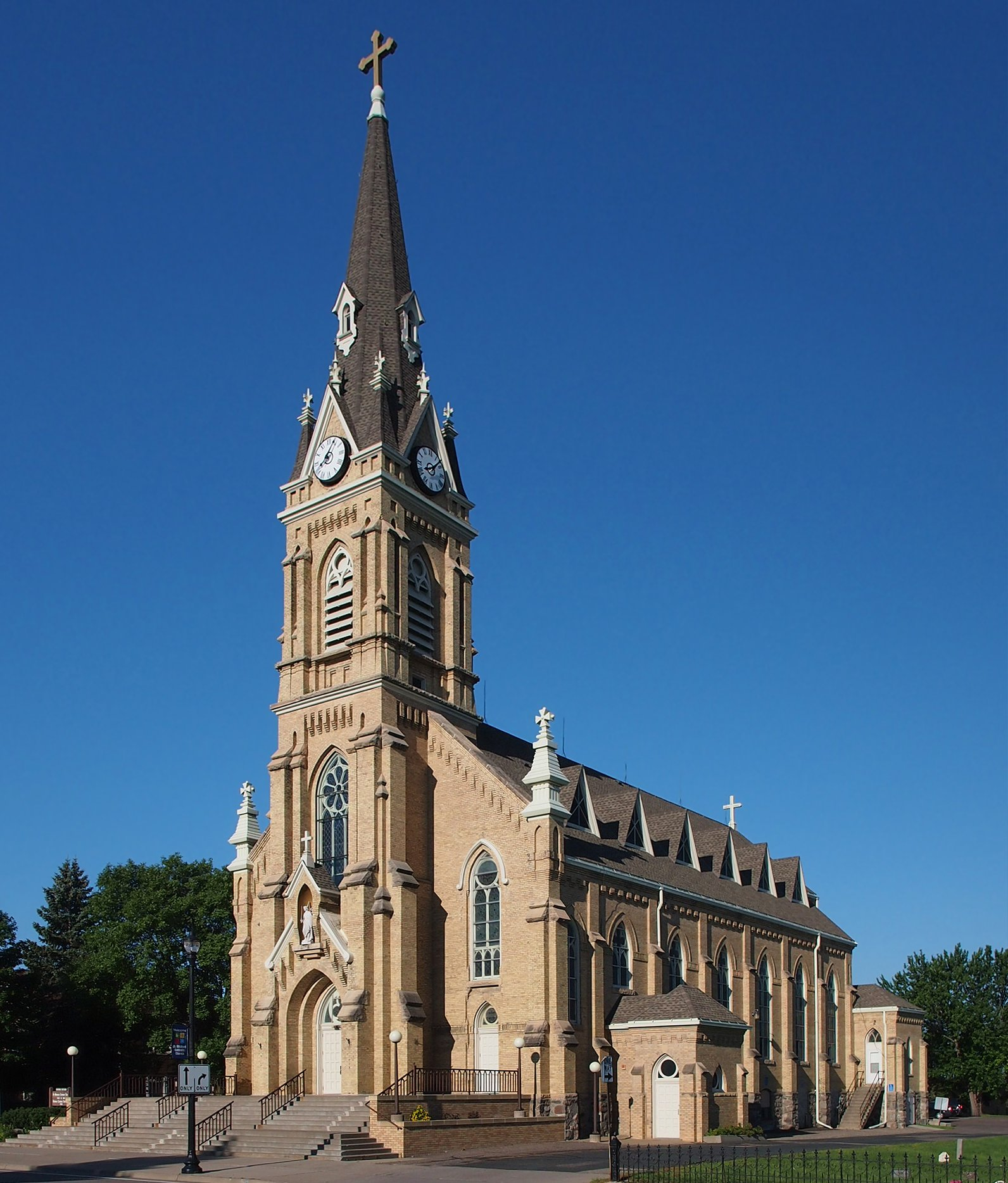
- The old Church of St. Michael pre-dates the city and serves as its namesake
- Motto: A Great Place To Grow
- Location of the city of St. Michael within Wright County, Minnesota
- Coordinates: 45°12′35.87″N 93°39′53.87″W
- Country: United States
- State: Minnesota
- County: Wright
- Incorporated: February 22, 1890

Government
  - Mayor: Joe Hagerty
  - City Administrator: Steve Bot
  - Councilmembers: Ryan Gleason; Tom Hamilton; Chuck Lefebvre; Zach Schoen

Area
  - Total: 36.374 sq mi (94.208 km^{2})
  - Land: 32.671 sq mi (84.617 km^{2})
  - Water: 3.703 sq mi (9.591 km^{2})
- Elevation: 961 ft (293 m)

Population (2020)
  - Total: 18,235
  - Estimate (2025): 22,498
  - Density: 643.8/sq mi (248.59/km^{2})
- Time zone: UTC–6 (Central (CST))
  - Summer (DST): UTC–5 (CDT)
- ZIP Codes: 55341, 55376
- Area code: 763
- FIPS code: 27-57346
- GNIS feature ID: 0650903
- Sales tax: 7.375%
- Website: stmichaelmn.gov

St. Michael is a city in northern Wright County, northwest of the Twin Cities. The population was 18,235 at the 2020 census, According to 2025 census estimates, the city has a population of 22,498.

== Geography ==
St. Michael is located at 45°12′35.87″N 93°39′53.87″W (45.2099640, -93.6649642),

According to the United States Census Bureau, the city has an area of 36.374 square miles (94.21 km^{2}), of which 32.671 square miles (84.62 km^{2}) is land and 3.703 square miles (9.59 km^{2}) is water.

The Crow River flows along the city's eastern boundary, separating it from the city of Rogers in Hennepin County. It also borders Monticello Township, Buffalo Township, Rockford Township, and the cities of Otsego and Albertville, all in Wright County, as well as the city of Hanover, which is within both Wright and Hennepin Counties.

== Infrastructure ==
=== Transportation ===
I-94, US 52, and MN 241 are three of the main routes in the city.

== History ==
A post office called St. Michael has been in operation since 1858. The city took its name from St. Michael Roman Catholic Church. St. Michael was incorporated in 1890. The Corner Bar, a restaurant in service since 1897, was on 10 Main Street South downtown; it shut down on January 9, 2020, and was razed on August 14, 2020. A complete history of the city, Faith, Family and Farming, was written by Bob Zahler. The history is also tracked by the St. Michael Historical Society, whose mission is "to collect, preserve and share the history of the City of St. Michael".

== Education ==
St. Michael is part of St. Michael–Albertville Independent School District#885. The St. Michael–Albertville school colors are royal blue and gold and the mascot is the Knight. The district consists of seven schools and two alternative academies. The seven schools include St. Michael-Albertville High School (grades 9–12), St. Michael–Albertville Middle School East (grades 5–8), St. Michael–Albertville Middle School West (grades 5–8), St. Michael Elementary School (grades 1–4), Fieldstone Elementary School (grades 1–4), Big Woods Elementary School (grades 1–4), and Albertville Primary School (Kindergarten). The two academies are Page Academy (middle school alternative) and the Knights' Academy (high school alternative). There is also a private Catholic school in St. Michael for grades K–8, including preschool.

A new high school opened for the 2009–10 school year, and a dedication ceremony took place on September 20, 2009. The previous high school was converted into a new middle school (Middle School West). The current middle school has been renamed Middle School East.

== Demographics ==
Historical population
Census	Pop.	Note	%±
1900	305		—
1910	401		31.5%
1920	406		1.2%
1930	385		−5.2%
1940	389		1.0%
1950	487		25.2%
1960	707		45.2%
1970	1,023		44.7%
1980	1,519		48.5%
1990	5,411		256.2%
2000	9,099		68.2%
2010	16,399		80.2%
2020	18,235		11.2%
2025 (est.)	22,498		23.4%
U.S. Decennial Census; 2020 Census

=== Racial and ethnic composition ===
St. Michael, Minnesota – racial and ethnic composition Note: the US Census treats Hispanic/Latino as an ethnic category. This table excludes Latinos from the racial categories and assigns them to a separate category. Hispanics/Latinos may be of any race.
Race / ethnicity (NH = non-Hispanic)	Pop. 2000	Pop. 2010	Pop. 2020	% 2000	% 2010	% 2020
White alone (NH)	8,899	15,116	15,854	97.80%	92.18%	86.94%
Black or African American alone (NH)	3	300	626	0.03%	1.83%	3.43%
Native American or Alaska Native alone (NH)	12	31	38	0.13%	0.19%	0.21%
Asian alone (NH)	45	395	386	0.49%	2.41%	2.12%
Pacific Islander alone (NH)	0	5	9	0.00%	0.03%	0.05%
Other race alone (NH)	1	8	57	0.01%	0.05%	0.31%
Mixed race or multiracial (NH)	50	233	702	0.55%	1.42%	3.85%
Hispanic or Latino (any race)	89	311	563	0.98%	1.90%	3.09%
Total	9,099	16,399	18,235	100.00%	100.00%	100.00%

=== 2020 census ===
As of the 2020 census, St. Michael had a population of 18,235. The median age was 36.6 years. 30.8% of residents were under the age of 18 and 10.3% of residents were 65 years of age or older. For every 100 females there were 101.8 males, and for every 100 females age 18 and over there were 97.2 males age 18 and over.

There were 6,014 households and 4,891 families. Of all households, 45.9% had children under the age of 18 living in them, 68.7% were married-couple households, 10.5% had a male householder with no spouse or partner present, and 15.9% had a female householder with no spouse or partner present. About 15.4% of all households were made up of individuals and 7.4% had someone living alone who was 65 years of age or older.

There were 6,210 housing units, of which 3.2% were vacant. The homeowner vacancy rate was 0.9% and the rental vacancy rate was 4.2%. The population density was 558.2 inhabitants per square mile (215.5/km^{2}), and housing density was 190.1 per square mile (73.4/km^{2}).

81.1% of residents lived in urban areas, while 18.9% lived in rural areas.

Racial composition as of the 2020 census
Race	Number	Percent
White	15,977	87.6%
Black or African American	633	3.5%
American Indian and Alaska Native	57	0.3%
Asian	392	2.1%
Native Hawaiian and Other Pacific Islander	10	0.1%
Some other race	217	1.2%
Two or more races	949	5.2%
Hispanic or Latino (of any race)	563	3.1%

=== 2010 census ===
As of the 2010 census, there were 16,399 people, 5,239 households, and 4,367 families living in the city. The population density was 501.1 inhabitants per square mile (193.5/km^{2}). There were 5,482 housing units at an average density of 167.5 per square mile (64.7/km^{2}). The racial makeup of the city was 93.26% White, 1.88% African American, 0.21% Native American, 2.41% Asian, 0.04% Pacific Islander, 0.56% from some other races and 1.65% from two or more races. Hispanic or Latino people of any race were 1.90% of the population.

There were 5,239 households, of which 53.0% had children under the age of 18 living with them, 73.1% were married couples living together, 6.6% had a female householder with no husband present, 3.7% had a male householder with no wife present, and 16.6% were non-families. 12.4% of all households were made up of individuals, and 3.4% had someone living alone who was 65 years of age or older. The average household size was 3.13 and the average family size was 3.43.

The median age in the city was 33.4 years. 34.8% of residents were under the age of 18; 5.2% were between the ages of 18 and 24; 31.7% were from 25 to 44; 21.9% were from 45 to 64; and 6.3% were 65 years of age or older. The gender makeup of the city was 50.7% male and 49.3% female.

=== 2000 census ===
As of the 2000 census, there were 9,099 people, 2,926 households, and 2,437 families living in the city. The population density was 279.4 inhabitants per square mile (107.9/km^{2}). There were 3,058 housing units at an average density of 93.9 per square mile (36.3/km^{2}). The racial makeup of the city was 98.46% White, 0.03% African American, 0.16% Native American, 0.51% Asian, 0.00% Pacific Islander, 0.16% from some other races and 0.67% from two or more races. Hispanic or Latino people of any race were 0.98% of the population. 49.9% were of German, 8.7% Norwegian, 7.0% Irish, 6.9% United States or American and 5.7% Swedish ancestry.

There were 2,926 households, out of which 51.9% had children under the age of 18 living with them, 75.1% were married couples living together, 5.6% had a female householder with no husband present, and 16.9% were non-families. 11.3% of all households were made up of individuals, and 3.6% had someone living alone who was 65 years of age or older. The average household size was 3.09 and the average family size was 3.40.

In the city, the population was spread out, with 34.6% under the age of 18, 6.3% from 18 to 24, 37.7% from 25 to 44, 16.0% from 45 to 64, and 5.5% who were 65 years of age or older. The median age was 31 years. For every 100 females, there were 103.3 males. For every 100 females age 18 and over, there were 100.2 males

The median income for a household in the city was $69,903, and the median income for a family was $74,236. Males had a median income of $46,488 versus $32,402 for females. The per capita income for the city was $24,742. About 1.4% of families and 2.7% of the population were below the poverty line, including 3.1% of those under age 18 and 10.0% of those age 65 or over.

=== American Community Survey ===
As of the 2023 American Community Survey, there are 6,981 estimated households in St. Michael with an average of 2.76 persons per household. The city has a median household income of $130,814. Approximately 4.0% of the city's population lives at or below the poverty line. St. Michael has an estimated 78.3% employment rate, with 44.3% of the population holding a bachelor's degree or higher and 98.4% holding a high school diploma.

The top five reported ancestries (people were allowed to report up to two ancestries, thus the figures will generally add to more than 100%) were English (95.2%), Spanish (1.2%), Indo-European (0.8%), Asian and Pacific Islander (1.3%), and Other (1.5%).

== Politics ==
Presidential election results

Precinct General Election Results
Year	Republican	Democratic	Third parties
2020	59.5% 6,611	38.1% 4,227	2.4% 265
2016	61.4% 5,673	29.9% 2,763	8.7% 804
2012	63.0% 5,741	35.0% 3,195	2.0% 182
2008	61.3% 5,289	37.3% 3,214	1.4% 120
2004	65.7% 5,146	33.5% 2,624	0.8% 59
2000	59.6% 2,845	35.3% 1,685	5.1% 244
1996	45.2% 1,395	40.4% 1,247	14.4% 448
1992	35.2% 467	32.4% 430	32.4% 430
1988	52.2% 533	47.8% 489	0.0% 0
1984	57.7% 492	42.3% 361	0.0% 0
1980	47.0% 358	46.9% 357	6.1% 46
1976	44.6% 290	51.1% 332	4.3% 28
1972	42.9% 216	49.1% 247	8.0% 40
1968	36.7% 142	54.8% 212	8.5% 33
1964	41.8% 145	57.9% 201	0.3% 1
1960	33.6% 105	66.4% 208	0.0% 0

== Notable people ==
- Dick Bremer — broadcaster for the Minnesota Twins; resides in St. Michael
- Chad Gable — professional wrestler for the WWE
- Father Paul Benno Marx — Roman Catholic priest and Benedictine monk, family sociologist, writer, and pro-life movement leader; born in St. Michael
- Robert O. McEachern (1927–2008) — schoolteacher, Minnesota state legislator, mayor of St. Michael
- Mitch Potter — track and field athlete, competed at the University of Minnesota and with Team USA; born in St. Michael and current resident
- Matt Spaeth — tight end for the Pittsburgh Steelers and Chicago Bears. St. Michael-Albertville High School alumnus; born in St. Michael
- Caleb Truax — professional boxer; born in Osseo and resides in St. Michael
