= Tye Harvey =

American pole vaulter (born 1974)

Tye Harvey (born September 25, 1974) is an American pole vaulter.

Harvey won the silver medal at the 2001 World Indoor Championships in Lisbon with a vault of 5.90 metres.

In March 2001 in Atlanta Harvey established a career best of 5.93 metres, on an indoor track. His personal best outdoor vault was 5.81 metres, achieved in July 2000 in San Marcos, TX.

Harvey was an All-American vaulter for the Minnesota Golden Gophers track and field team, finishing runner-up in the pole vault at the 1997 NCAA Division I Indoor Track and Field Championships.

Since 2004, he has been married to high jumper Amy Acuff (born on July 14, 1975).
