= Hanover, Minnesota =

City in Minnesota, United States

- City
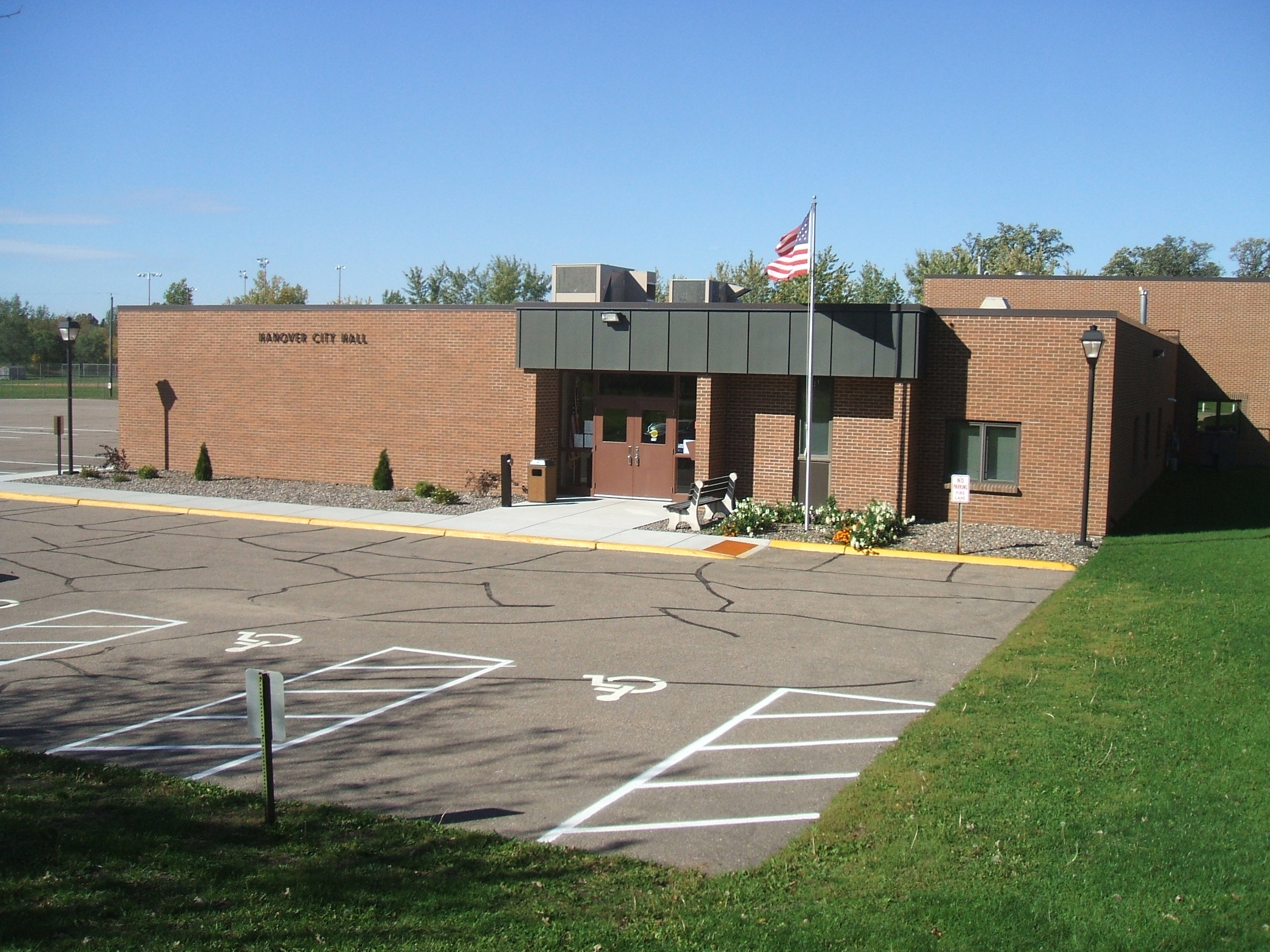
- Hanover City Hall

- Logo
- Nickname: Little City on the Crow
- Location of the city of Hanover within Wright and Hennepin Counties in the state of Minnesota
- Coordinates: 45°9′48″N 93°39′39″W
- Country: United States
- State: Minnesota
- Counties: Wright, Hennepin
- Founded: 1877
- Incorporated: 1891

Government
  - Mayor: Chris Kauffman

Area
  - Total: 5.64 sq mi (14.61 km^{2})
  - Land: 5.49 sq mi (14.21 km^{2})
  - Water: 0.16 sq mi (0.41 km^{2})
- Elevation: 922 ft (281 m)

Population (2020)
  - Total: 3,548
  - Estimate (2021): 3,594
  - Density: 646.7/sq mi (249.71/km^{2})
- Time zone: UTC-6 (Central)
  - Summer (DST): UTC-5 (CDT)
- ZIP code: 55341
- Area code: 763
- FIPS code: 27-26990
- GNIS feature ID: 0644632
- Website: hanovermn.gov

Hanover is a city in Wright and Hennepin counties in the U.S. state of Minnesota. The population was 3,548 at the 2020 census. Hanover is mainly located within Wright County; only a small part of the city extends into Hennepin County.

Even though Hanover is partly in the metropolitan county of Hennepin, it does not fall under the jurisdiction of the Twin Cities Metropolitan Council.

== History ==
Hanover was founded by Jacob Vollbrecht, who settled in the area due to the fertile soil, large water bodies, and forests. Vollbrecht first settled in the area in 1856. More German-Americans would arrive following the passage of the Homestead Act in 1862.

Hanover was laid out in 1877 and named after the German city of Hanover. A post office has been in operation at Hanover since 1877. Hanover was incorporated on August 29, 1891. One property in Hanover, the 1885 Hanover Bridge, is listed on the National Register of Historic Places.

== Geography ==
According to the United States Census Bureau, the city has a total area of 5.59 square miles (14.48 km^{2}); 5.45 square miles (14.12 km^{2}) is land and 0.14 square miles (0.36 km^{2}) is water. County Road 19 serves as a main route in the city.

Hanover is located along the Crow River. The river flows through the Downtown River District, and serves as the boundary line between Hennepin and Wright counties.

Nearby places include St. Michael, Albertville, Rogers, Maple Grove, Corcoran, Greenfield, Rockford, Buffalo and Montrose.

The singer and Minnesota native Bob Dylan used to own a ranch near Hanover in Hennepin County.

== Education ==
Most of Hanover is located in the Buffalo–Hanover–Montrose School District. It has its own elementary school for grades K–5. For grades 6–8, students in the area are bused to Buffalo Community Middle School in Buffalo, Minnesota. Several elementary schools in the district follow this procedure. The high school for the district, Buffalo High School, is also located in Buffalo. It is known for its arts magnet program.

Portions of Hanover are also located in the St. Michael-Albertville (STMA) School District.

== Demographics ==
Historical population
Census	Pop.	Note	%±
1900	259		—
1910	267		3.1%
1920	199		−25.5%
1930	197		−1.0%
1940	241		22.3%
1950	228		−5.4%
1960	263		15.4%
1970	365		38.8%
1980	647		77.3%
1990	787		21.6%
2000	1,355		72.2%
2010	2,938		116.8%
2020	3,548		20.8%
2021 (est.)	3,594		1.3%
U.S. Decennial Census; 2020 Census

=== 2020 census ===
As of the 2020 census, Hanover had a population of 3,548. The median age was 35.9 years. 33.3% of residents were under the age of 18 and 7.4% of residents were 65 years of age or older. For every 100 females there were 101.1 males, and for every 100 females age 18 and over there were 101.1 males age 18 and over.

84.6% of residents lived in urban areas, while 15.4% lived in rural areas.

There were 1,126 households in Hanover, of which 53.2% had children under the age of 18 living in them. Of all households, 74.2% were married-couple households, 10.3% were households with a male householder and no spouse or partner present, and 11.6% were households with a female householder and no spouse or partner present. About 12.3% of all households were made up of individuals and 4.4% had someone living alone who was 65 years of age or older.

There were 1,153 housing units, of which 2.3% were vacant. The homeowner vacancy rate was 1.3% and the rental vacancy rate was 1.0%.

Racial composition as of the 2020 census
Race	Number	Percent
White	3,232	91.1%
Black or African American	23	0.6%
American Indian and Alaska Native	10	0.3%
Asian	78	2.2%
Native Hawaiian and Other Pacific Islander	1	0.0%
Some other race	42	1.2%
Two or more races	162	4.6%
Hispanic or Latino (of any race)	77	2.2%

=== 2010 census ===
As of the census of 2010, there were 2,938 people, 926 households and 807 families living in the city. The population density was 539.1 per square mile (208.1/km^{2}). There were 950 housing units at an average density of 174.3 per square mile (67.3/km^{2}). The racial makeup was 96.0% White, 0.6% African American, 0.2% Native American, 1.5% Asian, 0.7% from other races, and 1.0% from two or more races. Hispanic or Latino of any race were 1.7% of the population.

There were 926 households, of which 56.9% had children under the age of 18 living with them, 77.4% were married couples living together, 4.9% had a female householder with no husband present, 4.9% had a male householder with no wife present, and 12.9% were non-families. 9.0% of all households were made up of individuals, and 1.5% had someone living alone who was 65 years of age or older. The average household size was 3.17 and the average family size was 3.36.

The median age was 32.5 years. 34.8% of residents were under the age of 18; 4.8% were between the ages of 18 and 24; 34.3% were from 25 to 44; 22.7% were from 45 to 64; and 3.5% were 65 years of age or older. The gender makeup was 51.4% male and 48.6% female.

=== 2000 census ===
As of the census of 2000, there were 1,355 people, 440 households and 370 families living in the city. The population density was 277.0 inhabitants per square mile (107.0/km^{2}). There were 456 housing units at an average density of 93.2 per square mile (36.0/km^{2}). The racial makeup was 98.75% White, 0.07% Native American, 0.37% Asian, and 0.81% from two or more races. Hispanic or Latino of any race were 0.59% of the population.

There were 440 households, of which 48.0% had children under the age of 18 living with them, 76.4% were married couples living together, 3.9% had a female householder with no husband present, and 15.7% were non-families. 12.7% of all households were made up of individuals, and 4.3% had someone living alone who was 65 years of age or older. The average household size was 3.08 and the average family size was 3.38.

33.4% of the population were under the age of 18, 7.3% from 18 to 24, 36.0% from 25 to 44, 18.7% from 45 to 64, and 4.6% who were 65 years of age or older. The median age was 34 years. For every 100 females, there were 100.7 males. For every 100 females age 18 and over, there were 104.8 males.

The median household income was $73,667 and the median family income was $79,809. Males had a median income of $47,462 and females $32,452. The per capita income was $27,826. About 0.8% of families and 0.9% of the population were below the poverty line, including 0.9% of those under age 18 and 2.8% of those age 65 or over.

== Harvest Festival ==
The Hanover Harvest Festival takes place annually on the first weekend in August. The festival consists of many activities including a 5K run, Kids Fun Run, Miss Hanover Competition, fireworks, parade and car show.

=== Miss Hanover Royalty Program ===
The Hanover Harvest Festival Royalty Program was begun in 2009 by Jackie Heinz who currently runs the program. To participate in the contest, requirements include being a rising senior in high school up to 22 years old, and having attended school in Hanover or lived in the area, or attended a local private school. The contest consists of contestants being judged on various criteria including accomplishments, community activities, club/office membership and future goals pertaining to education and career. They are also judged on poise, dress, answers to interview questions and speech. Each year, two girls are crowned Miss Hanover and Hanover Princess. Miss Hanover has the opportunity to be invited by the Aquatennial Royal Court in Minneapolis to participate in Aquatennial Queen of the Lakes Scholarship Program. If the Queen (Miss Hanover) decides not to participate in Aquatennial, then the opportunity passes to the Princess. Past royalty are:

Miss Hanover

- Dana Bjorge 2009–2010
- Kenzie Haight 2010–2011
- Kaelie Lund 2011–2012
- Amanda Jendro 2012–2013
- Krystle Brown 2013-2014
- Mallory Gutknecht 2014-2015
- Belle Wanke 2015-2016
- Abigail Staggert 2016-2017
- Hannah Hochstedler 2017-2018
- Kaitlin Galdonik 2018-2019
- Kiley Irwin 2019-2020-2021
- Daphne Grambart 2021-2022
- Grace Panek 2022-2023
