= Albertville Premium Outlets =

- Location: Albertville, Minnesota
- Coordinates: 45°14′44″N 93°40′05″W
- Opened: April 17, 2000; 26 years ago
- Developer: JMJ Properties
- Manager: Simon Premium Outlets
- Owner: Simon Property Group
- Num. of stores: 110+
- Num. of anchor tenants: 1
- Floors: 1
- Parking: 5,000
- Website: premiumoutlets.com/

Albertville Premium Outlets is an outlet center mall located in the Minneapolis-St. Paul, Minnesota metropolitan area, in the northwest suburb of Albertville, Minnesota. Albertville Premium Outlets is owned and managed by Simon Property Group. The center features over 100 stores, including Ralph Lauren, Nike, Coach, Lucky Brand Jeans, Puma and more.

Albertville Premium Outlets has one anchor store located on their property, Ashley Home Furniture Studio. Also, Albertville Premium Outlets is home to a few dining options, which include TCBY Yogurt, Burger King, Five Guys, Starbucks, and Subway.

The outlet mall, which opened in 2000, was purchased from JMJ Properties of Muskegon, Michigan in 2002 by Chelsea Property Group. When Chelsea merged with Simon Property Group in 2004, the Chelsea Premium Outlets platform became Simon Premium Outlets, and ownership shifted again to Simon.

Albertville Premium Outlets was once the only Simon Premium Outlets location in Minnesota, until Twin Cities Premium Outlets, an outlet mall in Eagan, Minnesota, opened in 2014.

== Renovations ==
Albertville Premium Outlets decided to undergo a renovation in 2004, which added 40 more stores on the other side on County Road 19 in Albertville, Minnesota. The original side on the outlets has a little over 70 stores and Ashley Home Furniture Studio.
