= Adam Steele =

American sprinter (born 1980)

Personal information
- Born: October 8, 1980 (age 46)
- Height: 6 ft 2 in (188 cm)
- Weight: 175 lb (79 kg)

Sport
- Country: United States
- Sport: Athletics
- Event: 400 meters
- Coached by: Phil Lundin

Achievements and titles
- Personal bests: 400 m: 44.57 (2003); 600 m sh: 1:18.86 (2001); 600 m: 1:16.40 (2004); 800 m: 1:49.22 (2006)
Medal record
Men's athletics
Representing the United States
World Athletics Championships
Disqualified	2003 Paris	4 × 400 m relay
Pan American Games
Silver medal – second place	2003 Santo Domingo	4 × 400 m relay

Adam Steele (born October 8, 1980) is an American former sprinter. Representing the Minnesota Golden Gophers track and field team, he won the 400 m at the 2003 NCAA Division I Outdoor Track and Field Championships. At the 2003 World Championships in Athletics, Steele won the gold medal in the 4 × 400 m by virtue of running in the heats, although his team was later disqualified due to doping by two of his teammates.

== Career ==
Steele competed for the Eden Prairie High School Eagles, where he won Minnesota State High School League championships in the 400 m, 800 m, and 4 × 800 m relay. In 1999, he set a school record 47.66 in the 400 m that still stands as of 2025. He also competed in cross country running and hockey.

Steele was invited to the Minnesota Golden Gophers track and field team on a scholarship. After requiring surgery for a foot injury in 2000, Steele was worried about whether he could compete. Nonetheless at Minnesota, Steele would eventually win Big Ten Conference titles in the 400 m, 600 m, 4 × 400 m, and distance medley relay events.

Steele redshirted his 2000 indoor and outdoor seasons at Minnesota. He finished 8th in the 4 × 400 m at the 2001 NCAA Division I Indoor Track and Field Championships, setting a school record of 3:06.61 minutes. Outdoors in 2001, Steele ran an 800 meters personal best of 1:56.25.

In 2002, Steele won Big Ten Conference outdoor titles in the 4 × 400 m and individual 400 m. He placed 4th in the relay at the 2002 NCAA Division I Indoor Track and Field Championships and improved his school record to 3:05.54 minutes.

As a redshirt junior in 2003, Steele was again 4th in the 4 × 400 m at the 2003 NCAA Division I Indoor Track and Field Championships and additionally placed 6th as the 400 m leg on his school's distance medley relay team. Outdoors, he was runner-up in the 4 × 400 m at the 2003 NCAA Division I Outdoor Track and Field Championships. Steele would win his first NCAA title in the individual 400 m, beating his diving teammate Mitch Potter and Otis Harris across the line by 0.006 seconds. It was the first Minnesota NCAA title in sprints and their first outdoor track and field title in 32 years since Garry Bjorklund. His winning time and personal best of 44.57 seconds was a world lead and remained in the top ten marks of all time as of 2017.

One week later, he was 6th in the 400 m at the 2003 USA Outdoor Track and Field Championships, qualifying him to compete at the 2003 World Championships in Athletics alongside his teammate Potter. The pair had to run eight races in nine days through the championships. Before his trip to Worlds in August, Steele won a silver medal representing the U.S. in the Pan American Games 4 × 400 m, finishing 0.06 seconds behind Jamaica. He was also fourth in the individual 400 m, running 45.72 seconds.

The 2003 World Championships was the last meet of Steele's season. Because he was one of the first athletes to arrive in Paris, he was initially served a 'trial' menu and had to ask his family to send replacement food from home. Given that France–United States relations were strained at the time, Steele was relieved to have been met with applause by the French stadium. In the first 4 × 400 m heat, Potter split 44.3 and Steele split 44.7 seconds respectively on the second and third legs to advance the United States into the finals.

The U.S. team would win the gold medal with Steele and Potter replaced in the finals, however soon after it was revoked as two other teammates were found to be doping. Steele said, "It was frustrating [...] Mitch and I were clean. I learned the good, bad, and ugly of professional sports [later] and how they operate behind the scenes [...] I was exposed to and saw a lot of doping activities". As two of the athletes who finished ahead of him at the U.S. championships were later disqualified for doping, Steele's 6th-place finish was promoted to 4th.

During his final year at Minnesota in 2004, Steele was runner-up in the 4 × 400 m at both the 2004 NCAA Division I Indoor Track and Field Championships and 2004 NCAA Division I Outdoor Track and Field Championships, coming behind only Jeremy Wariner's Baylor team. He was also fifth in the 2004 indoor distance medley relay championship. He left Minnesota after having won the Big Ten Medal of Honor.

Steele finished 4th in his 400 m semi-final at the 2004 United States Olympic trials and did not make the finals. At the 2005 USA Indoor Track and Field Championships, Steele was 4th in his 400 m heat and again did not make the finals. Steele described his 2005 season as frustrating, saying, "I was trying to get back to my form in 2003. For whatever reason I could not get back".

In 2006, Steele set a 800 meters personal best of 1:49.22 minutes. He competed for the first time in the 800 m at the 2006 USA Outdoor Track and Field Championships but finished 10th in his heat, running 1:51.76 minutes.

The following year, Steele lived in Eugene, Oregon training with the Oregon Track Club under coach Frank Gagliano, traditionally a more distance-oriented program. He decided to change his focus to the 800 m and decided Oregon over the Santa Monica Track Club in Los Angeles, training with Nick Symmonds.

Steele was 4th in his 800 m heat at the 2008 USA Indoor Track and Field Championships but didn't make the finals. He attempted to qualify for the U.S. 800 m team at the 2008 Summer Olympics, but suffered an Achilles injury that caused him to retire from running professionally.

== Personal life ==
Steele was born on October 8, 1980 to Stephen and Yvonne Steele. His older brother Matt was a state champion in the 110 meters hurdles and also competed in cross country running and downhill skiing. His younger sister Melissa Merritt won three state titles in the 300 m hurdles, ran alongside Adam on the Minnesota Golden Gophers, and eventually became an elementary school teacher. Matt later became a United States Army Ranger stationed in South Korea during the Iraq War. They attended Eden Prairie High School in Eden Prairie, Minnesota, where he grew up.

Aside from his sporting activities, Steele became an Eagle Scout in high school. At the University of Minnesota, while being coached by Phil Lundin, Steele did a bachelor's degree in sociology and a master’s degree in applied kinesiology. While in college to make money Steele was an usher at Minnesota Twins games, was a carnival employee at the Minnesota State Fair and Iowa State Fair, and worked for Harley Davidson and the Sturgis Motorcycle Rally.

Following school, he served on the Eugene Police for ten years. He co-owned a mental health clinic in Bend, Oregon, with his wife Katie Leary, a therapist and former college athlete for Florida State, and founded the Athletes Mental Health Foundation. He has three children.

In addition to being a competitor, Steele considered himself a fan of the sport. He believed in the foundation of a track and field athletes' union, writing, "What this sport needs is a strong union so the athletes are treated fairly and have input on how the sport is presented to the fans".

In 2017, Steele was inducted into the Minnesota Golden Gophers hall of fame. He was inducted into the Eden Prairie Schools Hall of Fame in 2025.
