= Church of St. Michael (St. Michael, Minnesota) =

Historic church in Minnesota, United States

- Church of St. Michael--Catholic
- U.S. National Register of Historic Places
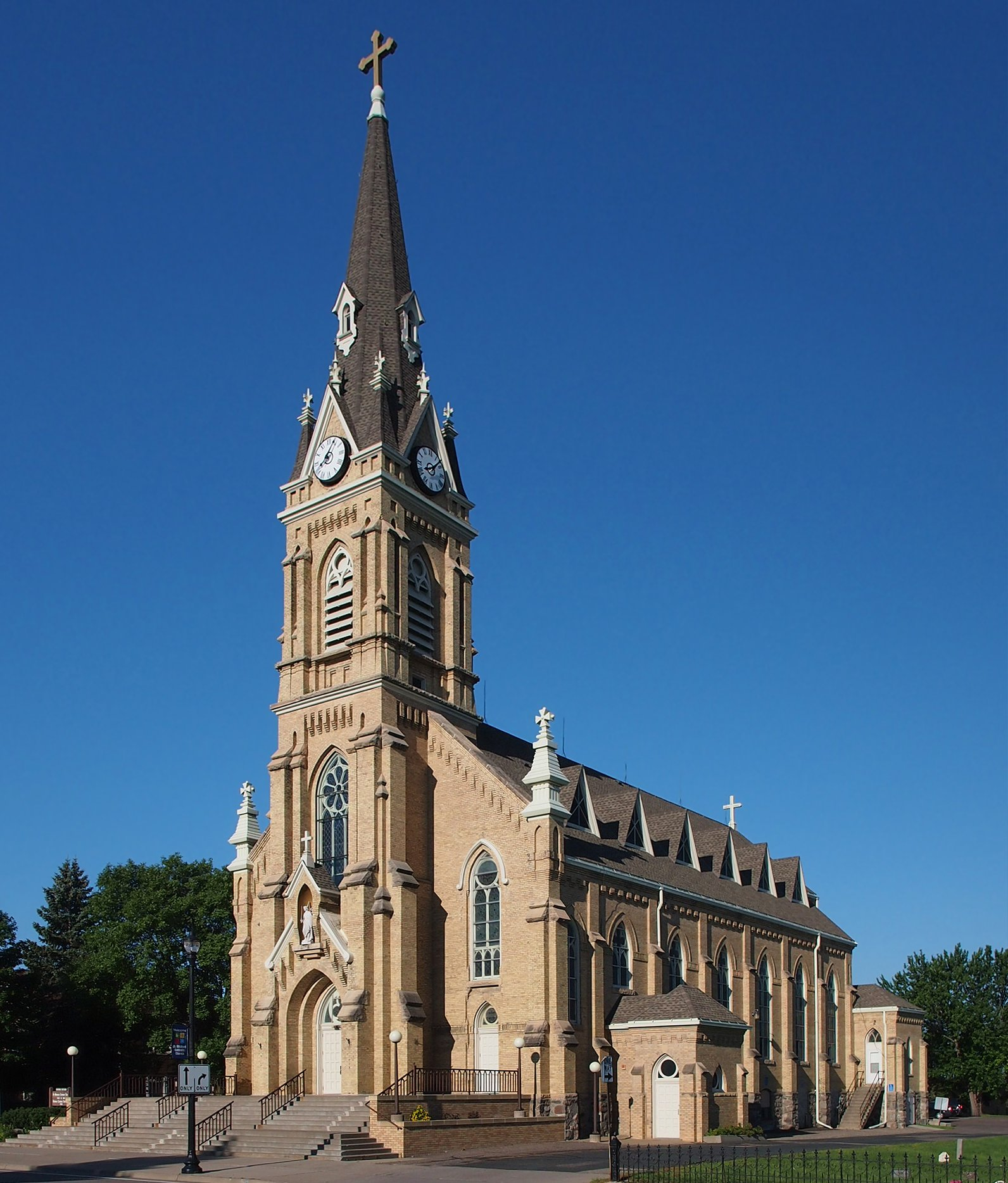
- The Church of St. Michael from the northeast

- Location within Minnesota Location within the United States
- Location: Central Avenue and Main Street, St. Michael, Minnesota
- Coordinates: 45°12′39″N 93°39′55″W
- Area: 1 acre (0.40 ha)
- Built: 1890
- Architectural style: Gothic Revival
- MPS: Wright County MRA
- NRHP reference No.: 79001279
- Added to NRHP: December 11, 1979

The Church of St. Michael is a historic Roman Catholic church building in St. Michael, Minnesota, United States, constructed in 1890. It was listed on the National Register of Historic Places in 1979 for having local significance in the themes of architecture, exploration/settlement, and religion. It was nominated for its status as the dominant architectural feature and the religious and social center of a German Catholic community.

== History ==
The community was established in 1856 and originally started worship in a small log church along the Crow River. The early ministers of the church came from Saint John's Abbey in Collegeville. In 1866 a new church was built in the center of the town and served for about 25 years. In 1890 the parish built a Gothic Revival building, which was the largest church in Wright County at the time. The building features ornate statues and German woodcarvings.

Although the parish had a mostly German ethnicity for many years, since 1985 the number of families in the parish doubled, and it no longer appears to be an ethnic parish. In 2004 the parish constructed a new building. The historic church building is still used for Mass on Fridays during the school year.

== See also ==
- List of Catholic churches in the United States
- National Register of Historic Places listings in Wright County, Minnesota
