= Minnesota State Highway 241 =

State highway in Minnesota, United States

Trunk Highway 241
- MN 241 highlighted in red

Route information
- Maintained by MnDOT
- Length: 3.531 mi (5.683 km)
- Existed: July 1, 1949–present

Major junctions
- West end: CSAH 19 / CSAH 35 in St. Michael
- East end: I-94 / US 52 / CSAH 36 St. Michael

Location
- Country: United States
- State: Minnesota
- Counties: Wright

Highway system
- Minnesota Trunk Highway System; Interstate; US; State; Legislative; Scenic
← MN 238	→ MN 243

Minnesota State Highway 241 (MN 241) is a 3.531-mile-long (5.683 km) highway in Minnesota, which runs from its intersection with Wright County State-Aid Highway 19 (Main Street / La Beaux Avenue) and Wright County State-Aid Highway 35 in St. Michael and continues east to its eastern terminus at its interchange with Interstate 94 and Wright County State-Aid Highway 36 in St. Michael.

MN 241 is also known as Central Avenue E and 42nd Street NE in the city of St. Michael.

== Route description ==
Highway 241 serves as an east–west connector route between St. Michael and Interstate 94/US Highway 52. The maximum speed limit is 60 miles per hour between the junction with Interstate 94 and Wright County Highway 19 in Saint Michael.

Highway 241 generally follows the Crow River throughout its route.

The Crow-Hassan Park Reserve is located south of the junction of Highway 241 and Naber Avenue (Territorial Road). The nearby park entrance is located across the Crow River on Sylvan Lake Road / Park Drive in Hanover.

The route is legally defined as Route 241 in the Minnesota Statutes.

== History ==
Highway 241 was authorized on July 1, 1949. Part of the road follows part of the original alignment of Highway 152. The highway was not marked until 1955, when the new alignment of 152 (now Interstate 94) began construction around the north side of St. Michael.

Highway 241 was paved when it was marked.

Due to burgeoning commuter traffic between the Twin Cities and the northwest suburbs, Highway 241 was expanded in 2007 from two to four lanes and traffic lights were added at major intersections along the route.

== Major intersections ==
The entire route is in Wright County.

Location	mi	km	Destinations	Notes
St. Michael	0.000	0.000	CSAH 19 (Main Street), CSAH 35 (Central Avenue) west	
St. Michael	1.990	3.203	CSAH 22 (Naber Avenue)	
St. Michael	3.394– 3.524	5.462– 5.671	I-94 / US 52 – Minneapolis, St. Paul, St. Cloud, CSAH 36 (45th Street NE) east	Interchange
1.000 mi = 1.609 km; 1.000 km = 0.621 mi
