= Hanover Bridge =

- U.S. National Register of Historic Places
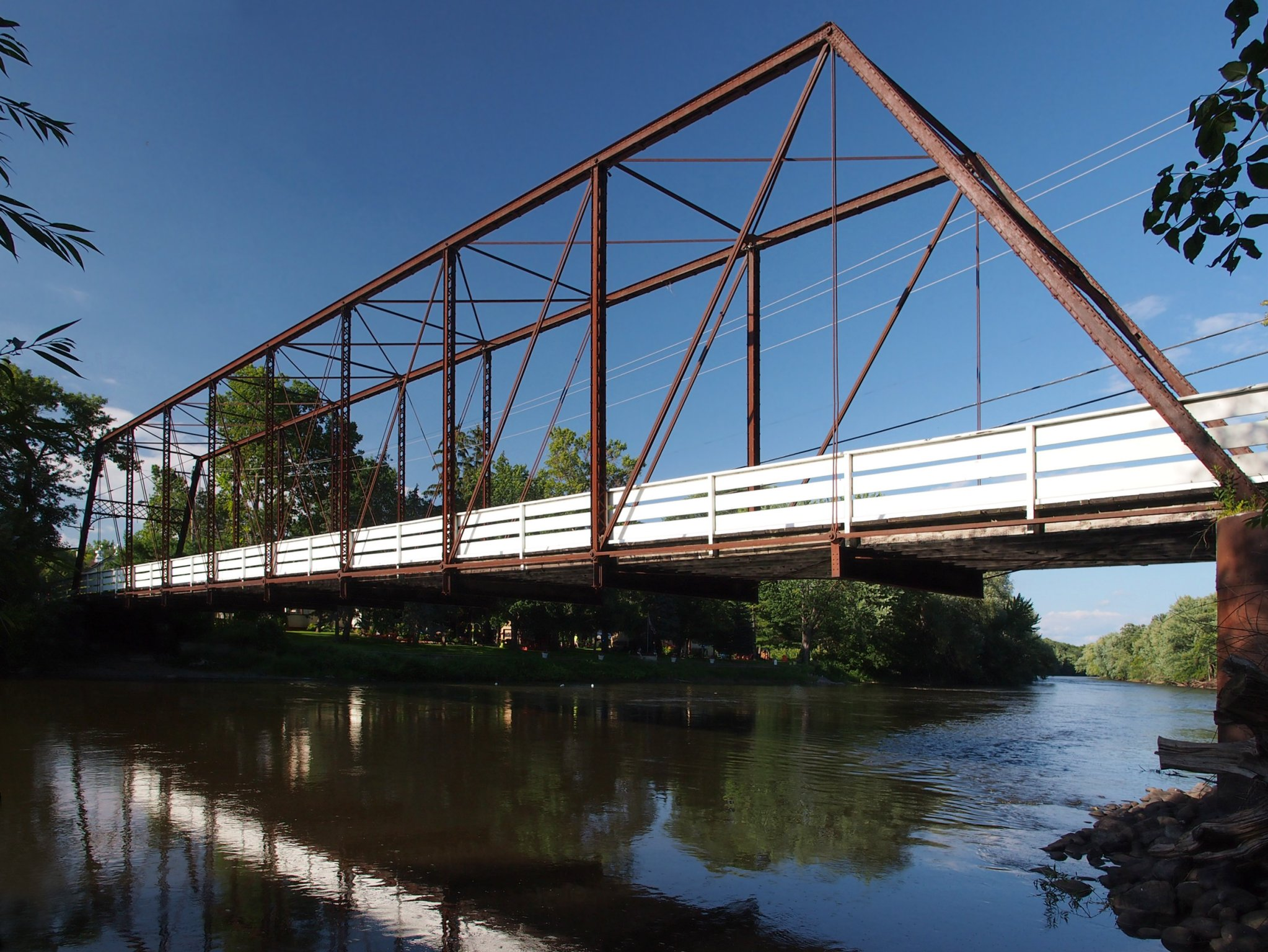
- Hanover Bridge over the Crow River

- Location within Minnesota Location within the United States
- Location: Off County Highway 19 over the Crow River, Hanover, Minnesota
- Coordinates: 45°9′12″N 93°39′43″W
- Area: Less than one acre
- Built: 1885
- Built by: Morse Bridge Company
- Architectural style: Pratt truss bridge
- MPS: Wright County MRA
- NRHP reference No.: 79001268
- Added to NRHP: December 11, 1979

The Hanover Bridge is a historic metal pin-connected Pratt through truss bridge spanning the Crow River in Hanover, Minnesota, United States, on the border of Wright and Hennepin Counties. It is the second-oldest Pratt truss bridge remaining in Minnesota. The Hanover Bridge was listed on the National Register of Historic Places in 1979 for its local significance in the themes of engineering and transportation. It was nominated as a well-preserved example of a bridge type once common in Wright County.

== Construction ==
The Hanover Bridge was built in 1885 by the Morse Bridge Company of Youngstown, Ohio. The company later changed its name to the Youngstown Bridge Company, and merged into the American Bridge Company in 1900. The Hanover Bridge is 231 feet (70 m) long, with a 15.1-foot-wide (4.6 m) roadbed and a 13.5-foot (4.1 m) vertical clearance. Its wooden deck was replaced in 1965 in a style similar to the original.

== Weight limitations ==
The bridge carried traffic until December 1966, although its weight limit was rather low. Children riding school buses to school would have to get off on one side and walk across the bridge, and then the bus would slowly drive across and pick up the students on the other side.

Although the bridge was later replaced by a modern concrete structure 1,500 feet (460 m) to the west, the old bridge is in use as a pedestrian bridge. Hanover citizens renovated the bridge in the 1980s. Additional rehabilitation work was completed in 2004.

== See also ==
- List of bridges on the National Register of Historic Places in Minnesota
- National Register of Historic Places listings in Hennepin County, Minnesota
- National Register of Historic Places listings in Wright County, Minnesota
