= Hassan Mead =

Somali-American long-distance runner

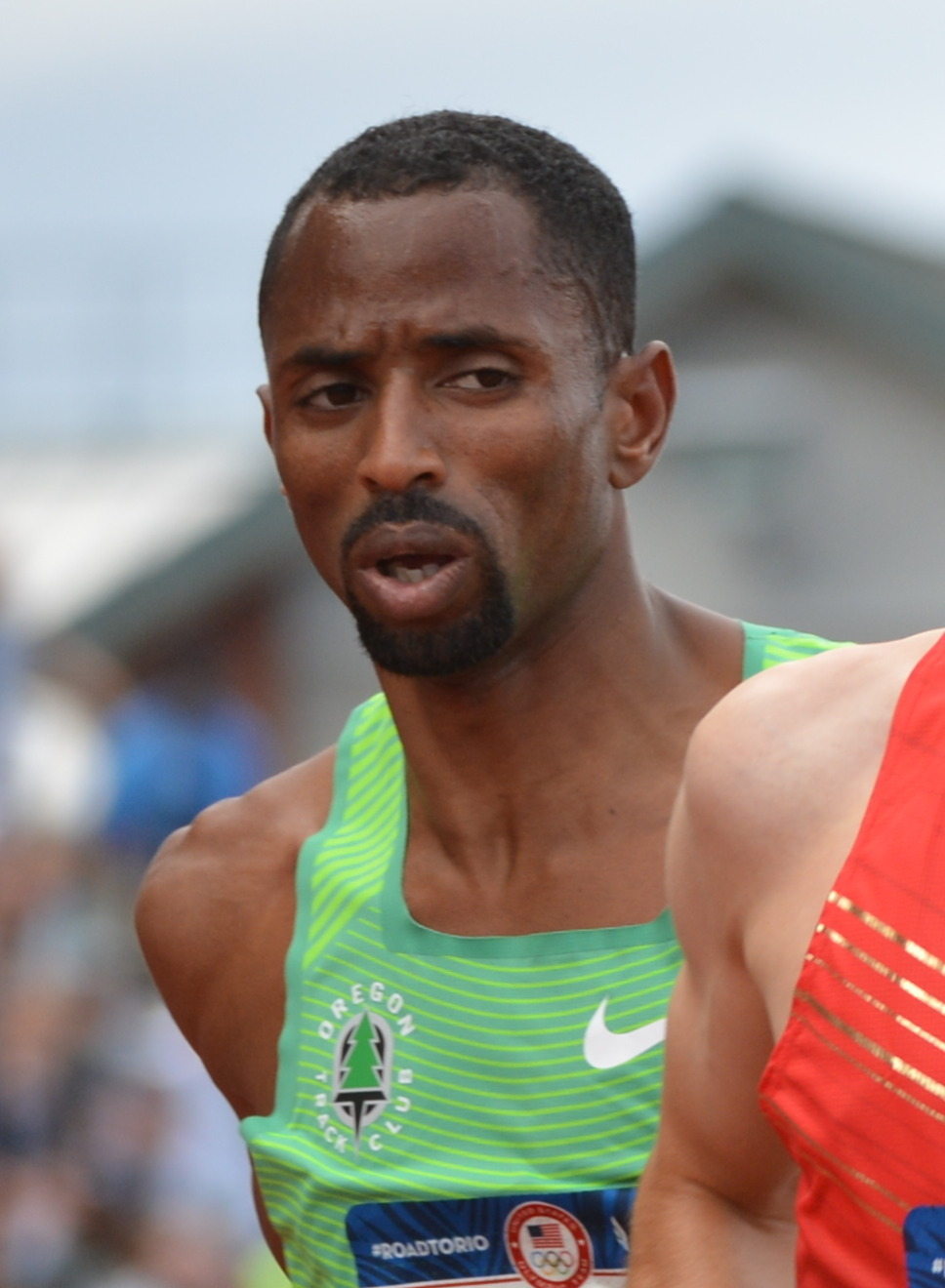
- Mead in 2016

Personal information
- Nationality: Somali; American
- Born: June 28, 1989 (age 37) Somalia
- Height: 6 ft 0 in (1.83 m)
- Weight: 145 lb (66 kg)

Sport
- Sport: Track
- Events: 1500 meters, 5000 meters, 10,000 meters
- College team: University of Minnesota
- Club: Oregon Track Club
- Turned pro: 2012
- Coached by: Mark Rowland, Steve Plasencia
- Retired: 2022

Achievements and titles
- Personal bests: 1500m: 3:37.65; Mile: 3:55.91; 3000m: 7:38.51; 5000m: 13:02.80; 10,000m: 27:32.49
- Updated on October 19, 2018

Hassan Mead (Somali: Xassan Miicaad, Arabic: حسن ميد; born June 28, 1989) is a Somali-American long-distance runner. He was a cross country and track athlete for the University of Minnesota. An eight-time All-American in his Minnesota career, four in cross country (2007, 2008, 2009, 2011) and five in track (2008 outdoor, 2009 indoor and outdoor, 2012 indoor and outdoor).

Mead is a nine-time Big Ten Conference champion, winning two in cross country in 2008 and 2009, and seven in track, where he swept all distance events in the 2009 indoor and outdoor seasons. Mead is currently running with the Oregon Track Club in Eugene, Oregon. Prior to his time at the University of Minnesota, Hassan is a 2007 graduate of Minneapolis South High School.

== Life and career ==
Mead was born June 28, 1989, to a family of farmers in rural northwest Somalia. In 2000, he moved to the United States.

=== High school ===
He initially resided in Minnesota, and then Ontario, California, prior to moving to Puyallup, Washington. He attended Stahl Junior High School and then Emerald Ridge High School. In his junior year, his first year racing, he finished 10th at the 2005 Washington State Class 4A State Meet. Later that year, he moved to Minneapolis, where he attended Minneapolis South High School for his senior year and competed in the spring track and field season and made it to the state meet in the 1,600 and 3,200 meter runs. He finished 6th (4:19.51) and 4th (9:15.93) respectively. In his senior season, he joined the South Cross Country team and went undefeated, including victories in the 2006 Roy Griak Invitational (15:49), 2006 State Cross Country Meet (15:10.7), and the Foot Locker Midwest Regional Meet (15:05). At the Foot Locker Nationals, he finished 4th (15:28), only 8 seconds behind the winner. In track and field later that year, he again made it to the state meet in the 3,200 and 1,600. This time, he finished 2nd (9:03.29) and 6th (4:14.17), respectively. He closed out his high school career as one of the finest distance runners the state has ever had.

=== Collegiate ===
In the fall of 2007, Mead entered the University of Minnesota, where he competed on the cross country team.

==== Freshman year ====
===== Indoor season =====
In his freshman season, he finished second overall in the Big Ten Conference Meet (23:47.70). In his very first 10K a week later, Mead again finished 2nd overall (29:57) in the Midwest Regional Meet to qualify for the NCAA Nationals. He only finished 43rd in that race (with a time of 30:36), but it was good enough to become Minnesota's first freshman All-American, and he was named the Big Ten Freshman of the Year.

Mead opened his indoor season at the University of Nebraska–Lincoln, where he took third in the 3k with a time of 8:13. On February 16, 2008, Mead ran the second fastest 3,000 meter time ever by a Minnesota runner (8:01.08) at the Husky Invite at the University of Washington. Two weeks later Mead raced at the Big Ten Conference Championships in Madison, Wisconsin. On the first day he took third in the 3,000 meter run, finishing with a time of 8:11, crossing the line behind Brandon Bethke of the University of Wisconsin–Madison and Jeff See of the Ohio State University. The next day, Mead placed second in the 5,000 meter run, finishing in a time 14:22, losing again to Bethke but defeating the Big Ten Cross Country Champion Matt Withrow. His efforts earned him two big ten medals and 2nd Team All-Big Ten Conference for his 5k race.

===== Outdoor season =====
Mead made his debut at the University of Oregon in Eugene, Oregon. He finished his first College outdoor 5K with a time of 13:57.86, the 7th fastest in school history and his first sub-14-minute 5K. At the Stanford Invitational in May, he bested that time with 13:49.35, the 3rd-fastest in school history. On May 15, he won the Big Ten Conference Meet by 50 meters, running a 14:12. Mead had also previously qualified for the NCAA Midwest Regional Meet on several occasions (the standard was 14:12). He finished 5th at regionals, advancing to the nationals with a time of 14:02. In the 5000 meter prelims at nationals, he again finished 5th in his first heat to qualify for the finals 2 days later. He ended up 6th overall, becoming the Gopher men's only All-American for 2008. His time of 13:44.30 also became a new School Record, and he finished his Freshman season as an All American in 2 sports, and only 14 seconds off of the Olympic Trials "A" standard to automatically qualify him for a chance to go to the Olympics in the 5000.

====== Qualifying for the 2008 Olympic Trials ======
In the week leading up to the US Olympic Trials, Mead revealed that he was going to compete in the 5000 meter run at the Trials. He was the 23rd and one of the last qualifiers to make it into the competition. In his semi-final heat, Mead finished 11th with a time of 14:07:44, 18th place overall, and did not advance to the finals.

==== Sophomore year ====
===== Cross Country season =====
On November 2, Mead ran a 24:26 to win the Big Ten Conference CC meet, leading the Gophers to a third-place finish. Mead's success made him the Big Ten Men's Runner of the Year for 2008. On November 15, Mead won the Midwest Regional Cross County Championships in a 10k time of 31:15.65. Mead placed 31st at the NCAA Nationals, fast enough to be an All-America for the second year in a row.

===== Indoor season =====
Mead made his first waves of the 2009 indoor season on February 14 when he broke the University of Minnesota school record in the indoor 3000 meter run with a time of 7:56.60 at the Husky Invite. At the Big Ten Indoor Championships in March, Mead won his first indoor Big Ten titles in the 3000m (8:02.61) and the 5000m (13:58.16). His efforts helped the Gophers men's team handily win the Big Ten Conference Indoor title. Two weeks later Mead competed in the NCAA Indoor Championships in the 3000m, finishing 4th with a new school record time of 7:56.15, and being named All American for the fourth time in his college career.

===== Outdoor season =====
On Saturday, May 2, Mead won his heat at the Stanford Invitational 5K with a lifetime PR of 13:28.45, the same race in which Galen Rupp's American junior record was taken down by Chris Derrick of Stanford. It was his first race at that distance of the season. Two weeks later, Mead won the Big Ten Conference Outdoor titles in both the 5k (14:20.75) and 10k (30:03.21). His performances again helped lead the Gophers men's team to win the Big Ten Conference Championship. On May 29, he won the NCAA Midwest Regional title in the 5K with a time of 14:02.25. At the NCAA National Championships on June 10, he won his preliminary heat of the 5k in a time of 14:00.79 to advance to finals two days later. The finals were run in very poor running conditions and the entire field ran a very slow race for a national final. Mead ended up finishing 6th overall with a time of 14:09.87, only 9 seconds behind Galen Rupp's winning time. Mead was named All-American for the fifth time.

==== Junior year ====
===== Cross Country season =====
Mead opened his 2009 season on September 26 at Minnesota's Roy Griak Invitational and dominated the soggy course. He sprinted to the lead at the start and never relinquished it, winning by 13 seconds in a time of 24:37.5. Mead defended his Big Ten title by winning with a time of 25:00.2 and earning a Big Ten Runner of the Year Award. Mead was a two-time Big Ten Runner of the Week honoree. Mead was the NCAA Midwest Region champion in a time of 30:31.31.9 which earned him the USTFCCCA Midwest Region Runner of the Year award. Mead served as team co-captain. Mead placed 16th at the NCAA meet (29:50.7) to become the second three-time All-American in Minnesota history. Mead led Gophers to a 24th-place team finish at NCAA Championships.

===== Injury =====
On a run in Arizona, Mead suffered an achilles tendon injury in January 2010, thus losing his indoor and outdoor seasons for the 2010 season. Later in September, while building up for the 2010 fall season, Mead suffered a collapsed lung on a run. This put him in the hospital for several weeks, not being able to race all of 2010.

==== Senior year ====
===== Cross country season =====
Mead was Minnesota's top finisher at the NCAA Championships (30:02.8), earning Top-25 honors among team standings and achieving All-American status for the fourth consecutive year, a Minnesota record. Mead blazed his way to gold at the Midwest Regional Cross Country Championships, defeating the pack in 31:16.87 over the 10K course. He finished fourth at the Big Ten Championships.

===== Indoor season =====
Mead set a personal record in the indoor 5000 meters, winning (among college athletes) the Husky Classic with a time of 13:33.42. He took home the Big Ten title in the 5000 meters running 13:43.13. He also was second in the 3000 meter race. Mead gained All-American honors in the 5000 meters with a 7th-place finish.

===== Outdoor season =====
Mead's last season at the University of Minnesota was very successful. There, he gained his status as the eight-time All-American, finishing fourth in the 5,000 meters. He also finished second in the 5,000m at the Big Ten Championships and ran a time of 28:12.74 in the 10,000 meters at the Payton Jordan Invite, setting the all-time school record.

He was given the 2012 Richard "Pinky" McNamara Student-Athlete Achievement Award.

=== Post-collegiate ===
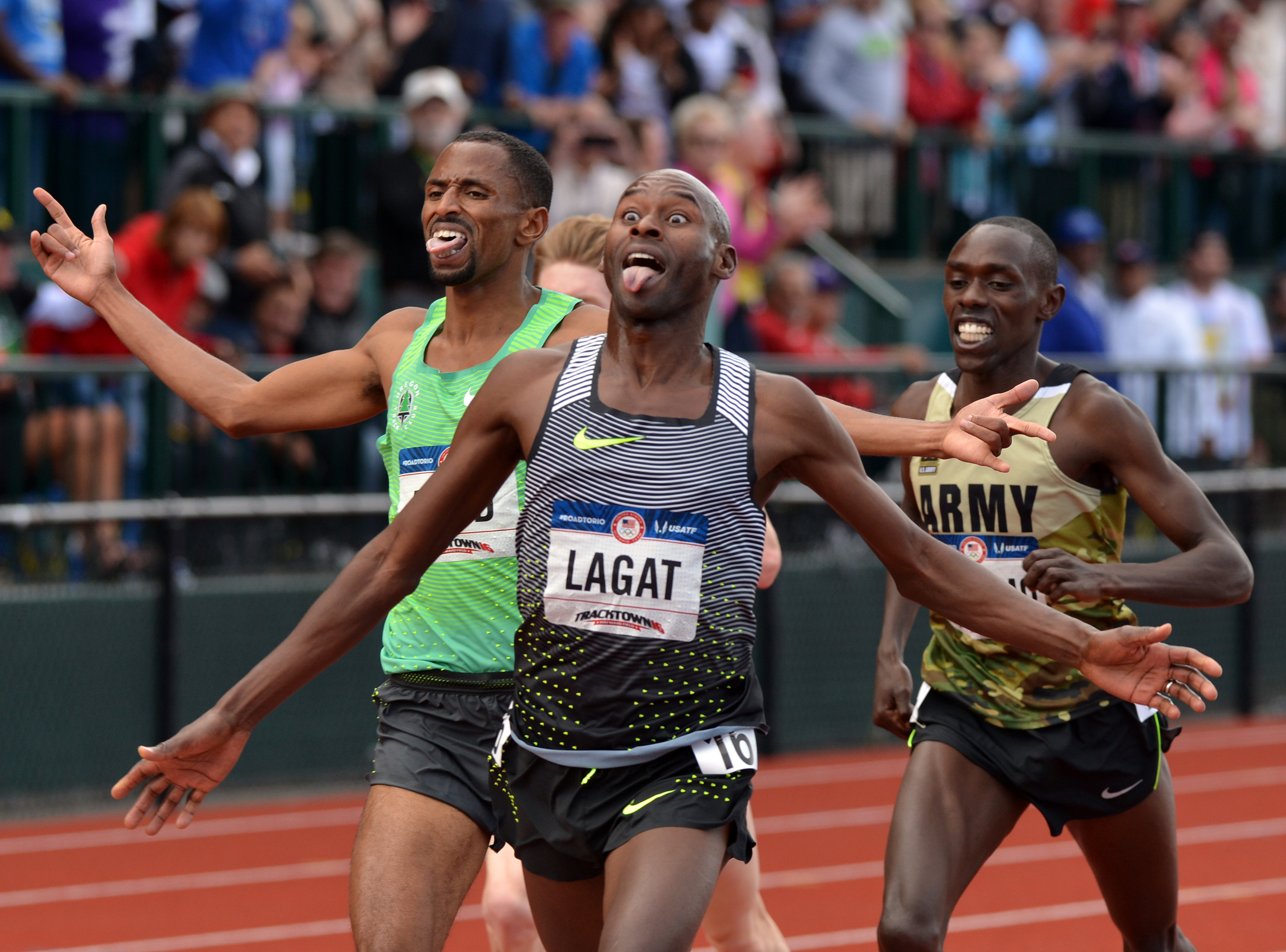
Mead (left) at the finish line of the 2016 Olympic Trials

representing United States
2019 World Championships	5,000 m	13:27.05	11th
2019 The Match Europe v USA	3,000 m	7:59.90	6th
2018 NACAC Championships	5000 m	14:00.18	(gold) 1st
2017 IAAF World Championships	10,000 m	27:32.49	15th
2016 Summer Olympics	5000 m	13:09.81	11th
2015 IAAF World Championships	10,000 m	28:16.30	15th
representing Nike
2021 United States Olympic trials	5000 m	13:47.85	11th
2019 USA Outdoor Track and Field Championships	5000 m	13:28.04	4th
2018 USA Outdoor Track and Field Championships	1500 m	3:43.65	15th
2018 USA Outdoor Track and Field Championships	5000 m	13:30.12	(bronze) 3rd
2017 USA Outdoor Track and Field Championships	10,000 m	29:01.44	(gold) 1st
2016 United States Olympic Trials (track and field)	5000 m	13:35.70	(silver) 2nd
2016 United States Olympic Trials (track and field)	10,000 m	DNF	DNF
2016 USA Indoor Track and Field Championships	3000 m	7:43.59	6th
2015 USA Outdoor Track and Field Championships	10,000 m	28:16.54	(bronze) 3rd
2014 USA Outdoor Track and Field Championships	5000 m	13:32.42	(bronze) 3rd
2013 USA Outdoor Track and Field Championships	5000 m	15:11.76	9th
2013 USA Cross Country Championships	12 km	36:37.1	13th
representing University of Minnesota
2012 United States Olympic Trials (track and field)	5000 m	13:30.21	8th
2012 United States Olympic Trials (track and field)	10,000 m	27:59.04	11th
2008 United States Olympic Trials (track and field)	5000 m	14:07.44	18th

==== 2012 Olympic Trials ====
In 2012, Mead made the finals of the Olympic Trials 5000 meters for the first time. He finished in eighth place with a time of 13:30.21, just behind fellow Minnesotan Elliot Heath.
Mead was 11th in the 10,000 meters with a personal record of 27:59.04.

==== 2016 Olympic Trials ====
Mead finished second in the 5,000 meters at Eugene, OR, on July 10, 2016, clocking 13:35.70, just 0.20 seconds behind winner Bernard Lagat.

==== OTC Elite ====
Since September 2012 Mead has been training with the Elite division of the Oregon Track Club under coach Mark Rowland.

On April 28, 2013, Mead set his then-current personal best in the 5k of 13:15.50 at the Payton Jordan Invitational in Palo Alto, California, which is half a second off from the Olympic 'A' Standard. Mead finished 9th in the 2013 USATF Outdoor 5k final in Des Moines, Iowa on June 23. Mead again set a personal best in the 5k of 13:11.80 at the KBC Night of Athletics in Heusden, Belgium on July 13, 2013. On May 4, 2014, Mead again lowered his personal best at the 5k distance, to 13:02.80 at the Payton Jordan Invitational, in Palo Alto, California. This performance put him #10 on the USA all-time list for the 5k distance.

On June 25, 2015, Mead placed 3rd in 10 km and made first US team 2015 World Championships in Athletics at 2015 USA Outdoor Track and Field Championships.

2022

In November, Mead received a warning from USADA for testing positive for ostarine. He officially retired during the case and reported that the violation was caused by him drinking a workout beverage during his unofficial retirement.

== Personal bests ==
Surface	Event	Time	Date	Event	Place
Outdoor track	1500 m	3:37.95	May 18, 2017	USATF Distance Classic	Eagle Rock, CA, USA
Outdoor track	3000 m	7:38.51	July 9, 2017	London Athletics Grand Prix	London, UK
Outdoor track	5000 m	13:02.80	May 4, 2014	Payton Jordan Invitational	Palo Alto, CA
Outdoor track	10,000 m	27:32.49	August 4, 2017	2017 World Championships	London, UK
Indoor track	Mile	4:07.35	January 28, 2012	Bill Bergen Invite	Ames, IA, USA
Indoor track	3000 m	7:38.85	February 20, 2016	Millrose Games	New York, NY, USA
Indoor track	5000 m	13:33.42	February 10, 2012	Husky Classic	Seattle, WA
