= Matthew Wilkinson (runner) =

American athlete (born 1998)

Matthew Todd Wilkinson
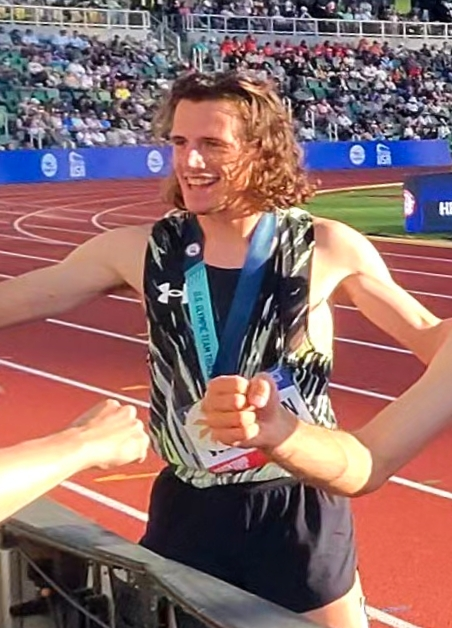
- Wilkinson at the 2024 U.S. Olympic trials

Personal information
- Nationality: American
- Born: December 27, 1998 (age 27)

Sport
- Sport: Athletics
- Event: Steeplechase
- Club: Dark Sky Distance

Achievements and titles
- Personal bests: 3000m s'chase: 8:09.56 (Rabat, 2026)

Matthew Wilkinson (born December 27, 1998) is an American steeplechaser. He qualified for the 2024 Paris Olympics by finishing 2nd at the U.S. Olympic Trials in Eugene, Oregon.

== Early life ==
He attended Minnetonka High School and Carleton College in Minnesota, as well as the University of Minnesota.

== Career ==
In May 2024, he finished second at the LA Grand Prix in the 3000 metres steeplechase in a personal best 8:16.59.

In June 2024, he finished second at the 2024 United States Olympic trials in Eugene, Oregon in the 3000m steeplechase in a time of 8:23.00. Wilkinson finished sixth in his heat at the Olympics, one spot away from qualifying for the finals; his time of 8:16.82 was faster than every runner in the two remaining heats.

He finished seventh in the 3000 metres steeplechase at the 2025 Meeting International Mohammed VI d'Athlétisme de Rabat, part of the 2025 Diamond League, in May 2025 in a personal best 8:11.11. He lowered his personal best again at the Diamond League event in Monaco in July 2025, running 8:10.23.

Competing in Winston-Salem, North Carolina, on 14 February 2026, Wilkinson set a new indoors personal best in the 3000 metres running 7:35.77. Later that month, he placed sixth over 3000 metres at the 2026 USA Indoor Track and Field Championships. In May, he ran a personal best 8:09.56 for the 3000 metres steeplechase at the 2026 Meeting International Mohammed VI d'Athlétisme de Rabat, part of the 2026 Diamond League. Wilkinson placed sixth in the 3000 m steeplechase on 28 June at the 2026 Meeting de Paris and fourth the following month at the 2026 Herculis event in Monaco. At the 2026 Diamond League Final in Brussels in September, he placed tenth in the 3000 metres steeplechase.

== Personal bests ==
- 1500 metres – 3:37.72 (Portland 2024)
- Mile – 3:53.04i (Boston 2026)
- 3000 metres – 7:37.01 (Boston 2025)
- 5000 metres – 13:22.74 (Boston 2025)
- 3000 metres steeplechase – 8:09.56 (Rabat 2026)
