= St. Michael-Albertville Schools =

School district headquartered in Albertville, Minnesota

St. Michael–Albertville Schools
- District 885 (STMA Schools)

Location
- Albertville, Minnesota; United States; 45.23344°N 93.65433°W

Information
- Superintendent: Ann-Marie Foucalt

St. Michael-Albertville Schools (District 885 or STMA Schools) is a school district headquartered in Albertville, Minnesota. In addition to all of Albertville, the district includes most of St. Michael. It also includes sections of the following: Hanover, Monticello Township, and Otsego.

In 2016 Ann-Marie Foucalt became the superintendent, effective July 1. All members of the school board voted to hire her.

Circa 2018/2019 it had 6,503 students, an increase by 97 from the previous year. Foucalt stated that the open enrollment program attracted students who live outside of the district to the district's schools.

== Schools ==
Secondary

- St. Michael-Albertville High School
- Middle East
- Middle West

Primary

- Big Woods Elementary School
- Fieldstone Elementary School
- St. Michael Elementary School
- Albertville Primary School
