= St. Michael-Albertville High School =

Location
- 5800 Jamison Ave NE; St. Michael, Minnesota 55376; United States; 45.2352°N 93.6910°W

Information
- Type: Public
- Motto: "Excellence is Our Tradition"
- Established: 1969
- School district: St. Michael-Albertville Schools
- Superintendent: Ann-Marie Foucault
- Principal: Andy Merfeld
- Staff: ~160+
- Teaching staff: 109.85 (FTE)
- Grades: 9–12
- Enrollment: 2,223 (2023–2024)
- Student to teacher ratio: 20.24
- Colors: Blue & Gold
- Song: Notre Dame Victory March
- Athletics conference: Lake Conference
- Mascot: Knight
- Website: hs.stma.k12.mn.us

St. Michael-Albertville High School (also referred to as "STMA High School") is a public high school located in Albertville, MN. Known as "STMA" for short, the high school located to a new building which opened for the 2009–2010 school year. Its Performing Arts Center (PAC) stands as the largest in the state as well and is often compared to many college-level PACs. A formal dedication of the school took place on September 20, 2009.

Student achievement ranks in the top 1% in Science, 10% in Math and 10% in English among Minnesota schools. ACT scores rank STMA in the top 15% of Minnesota high schools and STMA High School is recognized as an AP Honor Roll school.

The school also houses a new Activity Center, which includes an indoor running track and raised walking track, six interchangeable basketball/volleyball courts and a state of the art, 5000 square ft. fitness center/weight room. All the machines and equipment were donated by Matt Spaeth.

The school district is well known for its athletic departments, especially the school's wrestling team which are 10X state champions and the school's football team, which won the state championships for the first time in 2015

On February 7, 2017, the STMA community voted to approve a $36.1 million bond referendum. Bond projects included improvements in the areas of safety, technology, maintenance, and activities. 12 classrooms were added along with a new stadium and more security. Construction dates were from September 2017 to July 20, 2018.

== Notable alumni ==
- Mitch Potter (1999), track and field athlete
- Matt Spaeth (2002), NFL tight-end
- Chad Gable (2004), professional wrestler for WWE and Olympian in Greco-Roman wrestling
- Adriana Rizzo (2016), professional wrestler for WWE
- Tessa Johnson (2023), college basketball player

== Activities ==
The STMA Activities Department currently offers 25 official extra-curricular activities and 15 official co-curricular activities.

Starting the 2019–2020 School year STMA will be joining the Lake Conference following recommendations from the Israel State High School League, bringing the number of schools in the conference to 7. STAM will be the second smallest school in the conference.

== State Championships ==
State championships
Season	Sport	No. of appearances	No. of championships	Year(s)
Fall	Soccer, boys	0	0	
Fall	Soccer, girls	0	0	
Fall	Volleyball	9	1	1983
Fall	Football	11	1	2015
Fall	Swimming and diving, girls	0	0	
Fall	Cross Country, girls	14	1	2018
Fall	Cross Country, boys	14	0	
Winter	Hockey, boys	1	0	
Winter	Basketball, boys	3	0	
Winter	Basketball, girls	13	3	2001; 2009; 2023
Winter	Wrestling	36	12	1996; 1997; 2004; 2005; 2006; 2007; 2013; 2018; 2022; 2024; 2025; 2026
Winter	Gymnastics, girls	4	0	
Winter	Swimming and diving, boys	0	0	
Spring	Baseball	6	2	2000; 2009
Spring	Golf, boys	3	0	
Spring	Track and field, boys	8	1	1999
Spring	Track and field, girls	8	2	1998; 2017

== Wrestling ==
Wrestling
Year	Record	State Place
1968-69	9-3	NA
1969-70	9-2	NA
1970-71	4-9	NA
1971-72	13-1	NA
1972-73	14-1	NA
1973-74	11-1-1	NA
1974-75	12-0	4th
1975-76	12-0	2nd
1976-77	13-1	NA
1977-78	12-0	NA
1978-79	12-2	NA
1978-79	12-2	NA
1979-80		NA
1980-81	9-3	NA
1981-82	7-5-1	NA
1982-83	12-6	NA
1983-84	13-4	NA
1984-85	20-2	4th (A)
1985-86	13-3	NA
1986-87	16-2	NA
1987-88	12-3	NA
1988-89	20-0-1	NA
1989-90	12-2	NA
1990-91	14-3	NA
1991-92	17-2	NA
1992-93	27-3	6th (A)
1993-94	22-1	5th (A)
1994-95	20-4	3rd (A)
1995-96	18-2	1st(AA)
1996-97	21-2	1st (AA)
1997-98	17-4	NA
1998-99	12-6	2nd(AA)
1999-00	22-3-1	2nd(AA
2000-01	26-2	2nd(AA)
2001-02	20-6	4th(AA)
2002-03	27-4	2nd(AA)
2003-04	21-0	1st(AA)
2004-05	35-4	1st(AA)
2005-06	32-2	1st(AA)
2006-07	22-5	1st(AA)
2007-08	19-8	6th(AA)
2008-09		4th(AA)
2009-10		2nd(AAA)
2010-11	30-4	2nd(AAA)
2011-12		2nd(AAA)
2012-13		Co-Champion(AAA)
2013-14	15-4	3rd(AAA)
2014-15		2nd(AAA)
2015-16		2nd(AAA
2016-17		3rd(AAA)
2017-18		1st(AAA)
2018-19		3rd(AAA)
2019-20		3rd(AAA)
2020-21		2nd(AAA)
2021-22	24-0	1st(AAA)
2022-23		2nd(AAA)
2023-24		1st (AAA)
2024-25	27-0	1st (AAA)
2025-26	27-0	1st (AAA)

== Wrestling State Championship Appearances ==
The St. Michael-Albertville (STMA) wrestling program has made the Minnesota State High School League State Wrestling Tournament 36 times, including 28 seasons in a row dating back to 1998-99. Additionally, the program has also made it to the state tournament in 33 out of 34 seasons going back to 1992-93, with 1997-98 being the lone season where the program did not make it to state. STMA has made it to the state championship on 24 occasions, having won 12 state titles. The program also owns the unique honor of having won a title in single-A, double-A, and triple-A classes.

Indicator	Meaning
*	STMA State Championship
**	Runner-Up

Year	Class	STMA Record	Champion	Score	Runner-up
1976	A	12-0	Canby	37-8	STMA
1996	A	18-2	STMA (1)	40-13	West Central Area
1997	AA	21-2	STMA (2)	36-15	Blue Earth Area
1999	AA	12-6	Jackson County Central	30-18	STMA
2000	AA	22-3-1	Jackson County Central	26-19	STMA
2001	AA	26-2	Blue Earth Area	26-24	STMA
2003	AA	27-4	Litchfield	33-20	STMA
2004	AA	21-0	STMA (3)	32-22	Adrian
2005	AA	35-4	STMA (4)	32-15	Scott West
2006	AA	32-2	STMA (5)	50-3	Milaca
2007	AA	22-5	STMA (6)	28-25	Perham
2010	AAA		Apple Valley	54-12	STMA
2011	AAA	30-4	Apple Valley	61-6	STMA
2012	AAA		Apple Valley	49-24	STMA
2013	AAA		STMA/Apple Valley (7)	28-28	Co-Champions
2015	AAA		Apple Valley	36-30	STMA
2016	AAA		Apple Valley	31-26	STMA
2018	AAA		STMA (8)	30-25	Shakopee
2021	AAA		Shakopee	30-24	STMA
2022	AAA	24-0	STMA (9)	39-27	Stillwater
2023	AAA		Hastings	33-32	STMA
2024	AAA		STMA (10)	47-10	Mounds View
2025	AAA	27-0	STMA (11)	46-18	Shakopee
2026	AAA	27-0	STMA (12)	46-18	Shakopee
