= Steve Plasencia =

American long-distance runner

Personal information
- Nationality: American
- Born: October 28, 1956 (age 69) Minneapolis, Minnesota, U.S.
- Height: 180 cm (5 ft 11 in)
- Weight: 66 kg (146 lb)

Sport
- Sport: Athletics
- Event: long-distance
- Club: Athletics West/Nike West

Steven Micael Plasencia (born October 28, 1956) is an American former long-distance runner. Plasencia competed in the 10,000 metres at the 1988 Summer Olympics and the 1992 Summer Olympics. In the closest 1-2 finish in the race's history, Plasencia edged out Keith Brantly by one second to win the 1992 California International Marathon (2:14:14). Plasencia won the Oct 1997 USATF National Masters Marathon Championship at age 40. His 14:02.86 5000 metres at the Drake Relays at the age of 40 was the American Masters record until 2014 when it was broken by Bernard Lagat.

Plasencia was the head cross-country and assistant track and field coach at the University of Minnesota, until his retirement in 2021, where he won three Indoor Big Ten Track and Field Championships (2009, 2010, 2011) and two Outdoor Big Ten Track and Field Championships (2009, 2010) . He was also an All-American runner for the Minnesota Golden Gophers track and field team, finishing 5th in the 5000 m at the 1976 NCAA Division I Outdoor Track and Field Championships.

== Achievements ==
- All results regarding marathon, unless stated otherwise

Year	Competition	Venue	Position	Notes
Representing the United States
1992	California International Marathon	California State Capitol, United States	1st	2:14:14
1995	World Championships	Gothenburg, Sweden	10th	2:16:56

== Personal records ==
- 5000 m – 13:19.37 (Oslo, Norway, July 27, 1985)
- 10000 m – 27:45.20 (Seattle, Washington, July 25, 1990)
- Marathon – 2:12.51
