= Mitch Potter =

American track and field athlete (born 1980)

Personal information
- Born: September 16, 1980 (age 45)
Medal record
Men's Athletics
Representing the United States
Pan American Games
Gold medal – first place	2003 Santo Domingo	400 metres
Silver medal – second place	2003 Santo Domingo	4x400 metres

Mitchell "Mitch" Potter (born September 16, 1980) is a male American track and field athlete, who competes in the sprints events, primarily the 400 metres. He is best known for winning the men's 400 metres event at the 2003 Pan American Games in Santo Domingo.

== Early life ==
Potter was born in St. Michael, Minnesota and attended St. Michael-Albertville High School. While in high school, he won five state Track and Field titles, and in August 2012 still held two state records in the Class A 300-meter hurdles and 4 X 400 meter relay. He was a member of the 1999 STMA Track Team that won the MSHSL Track & Field Class A Championship.

== Professional career ==
Potter earned his spot in 2003 Pan American games by finishing 4th at the USA Outdoor Track and Field Championships Potter had set his personal best (44.58) in the 400 metres a week earlier on June 14, 2003 in Sacramento while finishing 3rd at the NCAA Men's Outdoor Track and Field Championships for the University of Minnesota behind teammate (and future 4x400 relay teammate at the Pan Am Games), Adam Steele. He was a 9 time NCAA All American.

Potter has continued to run beyond college with occasional success. He himself complains his tendency to go out too hard at the beginning of the race costs him coming home.

In 2004 he finished seventh in the semifinal at the Olympic Trials (45.67), second at the Drake Relays (46.89) and first at Cedar Falls (44.88). He did not compete in 2005. Potter graduated from the University of Minnesota in 2004.

Potter was inducted into the St. Michael-Albertville High School Hall of Fame in August 2012.
