= Albertville, Minnesota =

City in Minnesota, United States

Albertville
- City
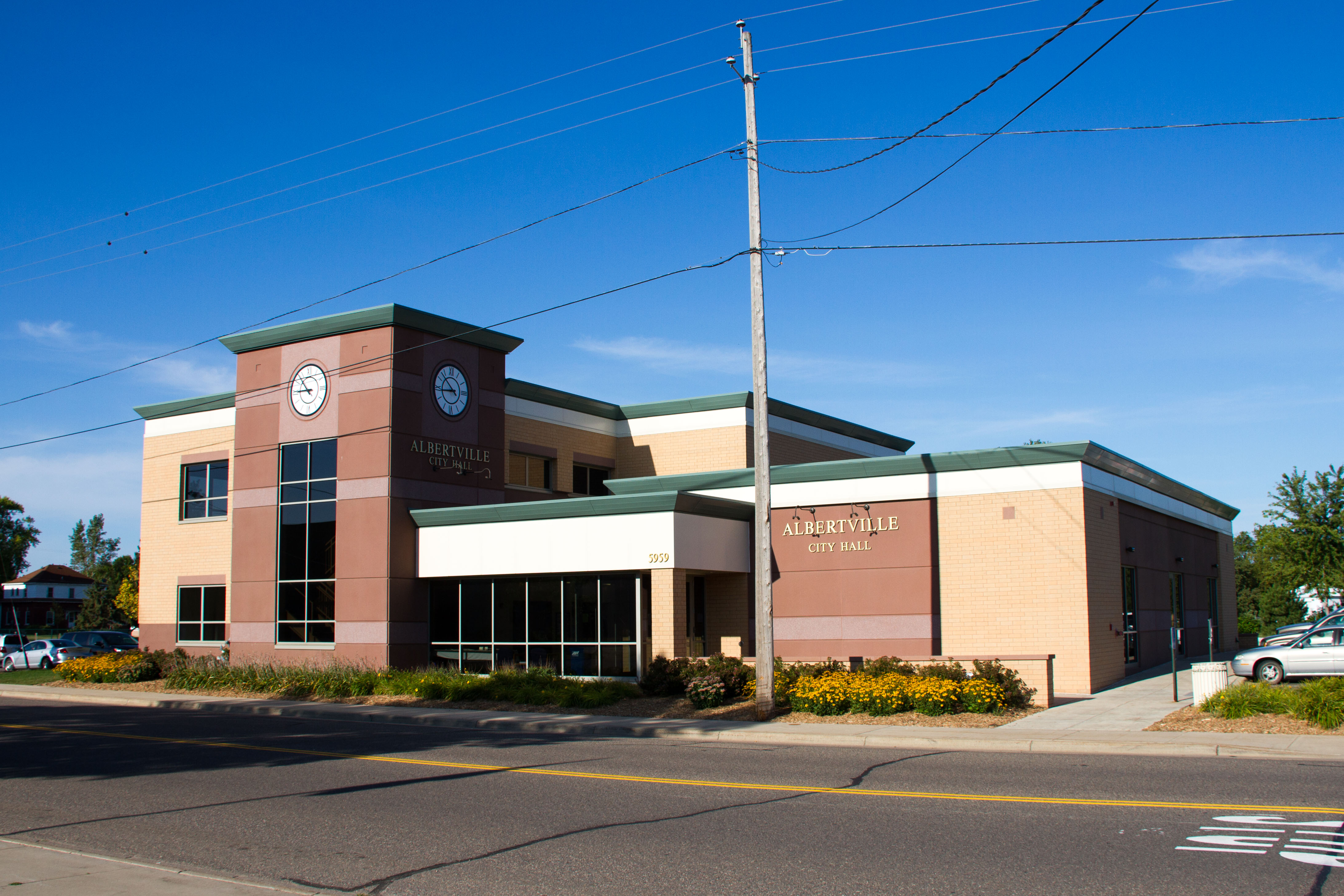
- Albertville City Hall
- Motto: "Small Town Living!Big City Life!"
- Location of the city of Albertville within Wright County, Minnesota

- Location within Minnesota Location within the United States Location within North America
- Coordinates: 45°14′17″N 93°39′35″W
- Country: United States
- State: Minnesota
- County: Wright

Government
  - Mayor: Jillian Hendrickson

Area
  - Total: 4.70 sq mi (12.17 km^{2})
  - Land: 4.42 sq mi (11.45 km^{2})
  - Water: 0.28 sq mi (0.72 km^{2})
- Elevation: 961 ft (293 m)

Population (2020)
  - Total: 7,896
  - Estimate (2021): 7,970
  - Density: 1,786.4/sq mi (689.75/km^{2})
- Time zone: UTC-6 (CST)
  - Summer (DST): UTC-5 (CDT)
- ZIP code: 55301
- Area code: 763
- FIPS code: 27-00730
- GNIS feature ID: 0639253
- Website: www.albertvillemn.gov

Albertville is a city in Wright County, Minnesota, United States. The City is a Northwest suburb of the Minneapolis- St Paul “Twin Cities” metropolitan area. The population was 7,896 at the 2020 census.

== History ==
The area that is known as Albertville was first a town site called "Hamburg" by Joseph Vetsch. Later that same year in August, the Minneapolis and Northwestern Railroad Company bought land for a railroad through the area (now the BNSF rail in downtown Albertville). After 30 years of contributions to the area, including Albert Zachman, who donated land for the current historic church by Central Park (also recognized as Lions Park) J.P. Eull and Theodore Aydt proposed a petition to incorporate the township as Saint Michael Station with a population of 190. The first election held, to construct a village hall, happened in 1903. It passed on a vote of 20-18 with a cost of $531.95 ($4,035.03 today). In the next few years, the town started to raise funds for a Catholic church, completed in 1902, was named the Church of St. Albert, in honor of Albert Zachman's contributions to the town. In 1909, Father Duhr proposed to change the name to Albertville in 1909, again in honor of Albert Zachman. The town approved, but was not official until September 1919, making the name change official.

== Geography ==
According to the United States Census Bureau, the city has a total area of 4.64 square miles (12.02 km^{2}); 4.37 square miles (11.32 km^{2}) is land and 0.27 square miles (0.70 km^{2}) is water. Albertville is generally considered the halfway point between Minneapolis and Saint Cloud.

Albertville is home to the Albertville Premium Outlets, One of 2 outlet centers in the Twin Cities, the other being located in Eagan Minnesota.

The city contains the Church of St Albert, constructed in 1902.

== Infrastructure ==
=== Transportation ===
Interstate 94/US Highway 52 serves as a main route in the city. Wright County Roads 18, 19, 37, 137 and newly added County Road 38 on the border between Otsego and Albertville, MN are other routes within the city.

== Economy ==
Albertville is the home of Albertville Premium Outlets, an outlet mall which houses 100 stores.

== Education ==
Albertville is part of St. Michael-Albertville Schools.

== Government and politics ==
Albertville's city council contains five council members, including the city's mayor, who serves a two-year term. As of February 2026, the current mayor of Albertville is Jillian Hendrickson.

Presidential election results

Precinct General Election Results
Year	Republican	Democratic	Third parties
2020	60.5% 2,535	37.1% 1,553	2.4% 100
2016	60.3% 2,251	29.7% 1,110	10.0% 373
2012	59.4% 2,199	38.4% 1,420	2.2% 83
2008	57.4% 1,969	40.6% 1,392	2.0% 68
2004	60.2% 1,796	38.6% 1,151	1.2% 37
2000	53.6% 920	40.8% 699	5.6% 96
1996	37.8% 358	46.8% 444	15.4% 146
1992	33.8% 269	38.1% 303	28.1% 224
1988	51.4% 232	48.6% 219	0.0% 0
1984	55.4% 184	44.6% 148	0.0% 0
1980	44.4% 126	46.5% 132	9.1% 26
1976	28.2% 67	66.0% 157	5.8% 14
1972	37.3% 76	54.9% 112	7.8% 16
1968	33.8% 52	63.6% 98	2.6% 4
1964	29.0% 38	71.0% 93	0.0% 0
1960	27.8% 35	72.2% 91	0.0% 0

== Demographics ==
Historical population
Census	Pop.	Note	%±
1910	222		—
1920	268		20.7%
1930	217		−19.0%
1940	243		12.0%
1950	238		−2.1%
1960	279		17.2%
1970	451		61.6%
1980	564		25.1%
1990	1,251		121.8%
2000	3,621		189.4%
2010	7,044		94.5%
2020	7,896		12.1%
2021 (est.)	7,970		0.9%
U.S. Decennial Census; 2020 Census

=== 2020 census ===
As of the 2020 census, Albertville had a population of 7,896. The median age was 33.9 years. 32.5% of residents were under the age of 18 and 8.1% of residents were 65 years of age or older. For every 100 females there were 98.7 males, and for every 100 females age 18 and over there were 94.6 males age 18 and over.

100.0% of residents lived in urban areas, while 0.0% lived in rural areas.

There were 2,656 households in Albertville, of which 47.4% had children under the age of 18 living in them. Of all households, 59.7% were married-couple households, 13.9% were households with a male householder and no spouse or partner present, and 19.6% were households with a female householder and no spouse or partner present. About 20.0% of all households were made up of individuals and 7.4% had someone living alone who was 65 years of age or older.

There were 2,730 housing units, of which 2.7% were vacant. The homeowner vacancy rate was 1.5% and the rental vacancy rate was 3.4%.

Racial composition as of the 2020 census
Race	Number	Percent
White	6,666	84.4%
Black or African American	371	4.7%
American Indian and Alaska Native	27	0.3%
Asian	217	2.7%
Native Hawaiian and Other Pacific Islander	3	0.0%
Some other race	139	1.8%
Two or more races	473	6.0%
Hispanic or Latino (of any race)	276	3.5%

=== 2010 census ===
As of the census of 2010, there were 7,044 people, 2,377 households, and 1,799 families living in the city. The population density was 1,611.9 inhabitants per square mile (622.4/km^{2}). There were 2,488 housing units at an average density of 569.3 per square mile (219.8/km^{2}). The racial makeup of the city was 91.6% White, 2.5% African American, 0.3% Native American, 3.0% Asian, 0.6% from other races, and 2.0% from two or more races. Hispanic or Latino of any race were 2.8% of the population.

There were 2,377 households, of which 50.9% had children under the age of 18 living with them, 62.2% were married couples living together, 8.7% had a female householder with no husband present, 4.8% had a male householder with no wife present, and 24.3% were non-families. 18.1% of all households were made up of individuals, and 3.9% had someone living alone who was 65 years of age or older. The average household size was 2.96 and the average family size was 3.41.

The median age in the city was 30.9 years. 34.4% of residents were under the age of 18; 6.4% were between the ages of 18 and 24; 36.6% were from 25 to 44; 17.3% were from 45 to 64; and 5.3% were 65 years of age or older. The gender makeup of the city was 49.6% male and 50.4% female.

=== 2000 census ===
As of the census of 2000, there were 3,621 people, 1,287 households, and 984 families living in the city. The population density was 826.3 inhabitants per square mile (319.0/km^{2}). There were 1,318 housing units at an average density of 300.8 per square mile (116.1/km^{2}). The racial makeup of the city was 98.51% White, 0.30% African American, 0.22% Native American, 0.25% Asian, 0.08% from other races, and 0.64% from two or more races. Hispanic or Latino of any race were 0.66% of the population. 44.9% were of German, 11.8% Norwegian, 8.1% Swedish and 5.1% Irish ancestry according to Census 2000.

There were 1,287 households, out of which 49.1% had children under the age of 18 living with them, 61.4% were married couples living together, 10.7% had a female householder with no husband present, and 23.5% were non-families. 16.9% of all households were made up of individuals, and 2.8% had someone living alone who was 65 years of age or older. The average household size was 2.81 and the average family size was 3.21.

In the city, the population was spread out, with 34.1% under the age of 18, 8.5% from 18 to 24, 41.5% from 25 to 44, 10.8% from 45 to 64, and 5.1% who were 65 years of age or older. The median age was 29 years. For every 100 females, there were 101.4 males. For every 100 females age 18 and over, there were 102.1 males.

The median income for a household in the city was $58,260, and the median income for a family was $63,578. Males had a median income of $41,783 versus $30,244 for females. The per capita income for the city was $21,424. About 6.7% of families and 6.9% of the population were below the poverty line, including 9.9% of those under age 18 and none of those age 65 or over.
