= Texas A&M Aggies women's track & field =

Texas A&M Womens Track & Field

Texas A&M Aggies Women's Track & Field
- University: Texas A&M University
- Athletic director: Trev Alberts
- Head coach: Leroy Burrell (1st season)
- Conference: SEC
- Location: College Station, Texas, US
- Indoor track: Fasken Indoor Track & Field
- Outdoor track: E.B. Cushing Stadium
- Nickname: Aggies
- Colors: Maroon and White

NCAA Outdoor National Championships
- 2009, 2010, 2011, 2014

NCAA Indoor Tournament Appearances
- 1983, 1995, 1996, 1997, 1998, 1999, 2000, 2001, 2002, 2003, 2004, 2006, 2007, 2008, 2009, 2010, 2011, 2012, 2013, 2014, 2015, 2016, 2017, 2018, 2019, 2021, 2022, 2023, 2024, 2025, 2026

NCAA Outdoor Tournament Appearances
- 1982, 1983, 1988, 1989, 1990, 1991, 1992, 1996, 1997, 1998, 1999, 2000, 2001, 2004, 2005, 2006, 2007, 2008, 2009, 2010, 2011, 2012, 2013, 2014, 2015, 2016, 2017, 2018, 2019, 2021, 2022, 2023, 2024, 2025, 2026

Conference Indoor Championships
- Big 12; 2007, 2008, 2009, 2010, 2012

Conference Outdoor Championships
- Big 12; 2007, 2008, 2009, 2010, 2011 SEC; 2013

The Texas A&M Aggies women's track and field program represents the Texas A&M University in NCAA Division I intercollegiate women's track and field competition. The Aggies compete in the Southeastern Conference

Texas A&M began NCAA play in 1982 as an independent team before joining the Southwest Conference the following year. The Aggies would compete in the SWC until the conferences dissolution following the 1996 season. During this period the Aggies would win just one individual National championship when Melinda Clark won the High Jump event in 1989.

After leaving the SWC, the Aggies Joined the Big 12 Conference, where they would stay through the 2011 season. After which, Texas A&M would Leave and Join the Southeastern Conference. The Aggies remain in the SEC today.

The majority of the Aggies success came under head coach Pat Henry. Under Henry, Texas A&M has been one of the more successful programs of the 21st century, earning all of its 4 NCAA Team Outdoor Championships. In addition the team championships, the Aggies have also won 10 indoor individual event championships and 27 outdoor individual event championships under Henry. At the conference level, The Aggies won both the indoor and outdoor Big 12 Conference Championships for four straight year starting in 2007 through the 2010 seasons. In addition, The Aggies would win the 2011 Big 12 Conference outdoor Championship, the 2012 Big 12 Indoor championship, as well as the 2013 SEC outdoor Championship. In 2017 Pat Henry was inducted into the Texas Track & Field Hall of Fame.

Two Aggies Have won The Bowerman Award: Jessica Beard in 2011 and Athing Mu in 2021. The Bowerman is an award that honors collegiate track & field's most outstanding athlete of the year.

The Texas A&M women's track and field program have produced numerous Olympians for various nations. The first female olympian Texas A&M ever produced was Linda Cornelius who competed in the Modern pentathlon in 1980 Summer Olympics. The Aggies have been particularly successful at producing Olympic relay racers, with five of their medals coming from the 4X100m and 4X400m relays. Texas A&M's first individual Gold medalist was Athing Mu who won the 800m race in the 2020 Summer Olympics.

== Head coaches ==
#	Coach	Years	Seasons	National Championships		Conference Championships	
#	Coach	Years	Seasons	Indoor	Outdoor	Indoor	Outdoor
1	Bill Nix	1982–1985	8	0	0	0	0
2	Charlie Thomas	1986–1989	8	0	0	0	0
3	Ted Nelson	1990–2004	15	0	0	0	0
4	Pat Henry	2005–2026	22	0	4	5	6
5	Leroy Burrell	2027–present	1	0	0	0	0
Total			53	6	5	5	6

== Yearly record ==
Legend
National champions
Conference champions

Season	Coach	NCAA		Conference	
Season	Coach	Indoor	Outdoor	Indoor	Outdoor
Bill Nix (Independent) (1982)
1982	Bill Nix		T-49		
Bill Nix (SWC) (1983–1989)
1983	Bill Nix	T-23	T-58		5
1984	Bill Nix	DNQ	DNQ		7
1985	Bill Nix	DNQ	DNQ		9
Charlie Thomas (SWC) (1983–1989)
1986	Charlie Thomas	DNQ	DNQ		
1987	Charlie Thomas	DNQ	DNQ		
1988	Charlie Thomas	DNQ	T-38	7	4
1989	Charlie Thomas	DNQ	T-17		
Ted Nelson (SWC) (1990–1996)
1990	Ted Nelson	DNQ	T-47		6
1991	Ted Nelson	DNQ	T-35		5
1992	Ted Nelson	DNQ	24		2
1993	Ted Nelson	DNQ	T-55		
1994	Ted Nelson	DNQ	22		5
1995	Ted Nelson	T-30	T-28		
1996	Ted Nelson	T-33	T-25		
Ted Nelson (Big 12) (1997–2004)
1997	Ted Nelson	T-43	T-22	11	6
1998	Ted Nelson	T-21	T-18	9	6
1999	Ted Nelson	T-38	T-41	9	5
2000	Ted Nelson	T-42	T-38	8	4
2001	Ted Nelson	T-45	T-28	6	4
2002	Ted Nelson	T-22	DNQ	10	11
2003	Ted Nelson	DNQ	DNQ	10	7
2004	Ted Nelson	36	13	9	3
Pat Henry (Big 12) (2005–2012)
2005	Pat Henry	DNQ	47	10	10
2006	Pat Henry	17	10	8	2
2007	Pat Henry	13	4	1	1
2008	Pat Henry	7	3	1	1
2009	Pat Henry	2	1	1	1
2010	Pat Henry	5	1	1	1
2011	Pat Henry	5	1	2	1
2012	Pat Henry	T-5	3	1	3
Pat Henry (SEC) (2013–2026)
2013	Pat Henry	12	2	3	1
2014	Pat Henry	5	1	2	3
2015	Pat Henry	T-15	3	3	2
2016	Pat Henry	DNQ	5	6	2
2017	Pat Henry	12	13	7	6
2018	Pat Henry	10	19	5	3
2019	Pat Henry	10	4	2	2
2020	Pat Henry	Cancelled due to the COVID-19 pandemic			
2021	Pat Henry	2	2	9	4
2022	Pat Henry	10	4	7	5
2023	Pat Henry	14	5	10	3
2024	Pat Henry	14	10	4	4
2025	Pat Henry	7	3	5	2
2026	Pat Henry	19	18	7	T-6
Leroy Burrell (SEC) (2027–Present)
2027	Leroy Burrell	TBD	TBD	TBD	TBD

== NCAA Individual Event Champions ==
Indoor
Year	Name	Event	Time/Mark
2009	Allison George, Sandy Wooten, Porscha Lucas, Jessica Beard	4X400-Meter Relay	30:32.52
2011	Jessica Beard	400-Meter Dash	50.79
2011	Jeneba Tarmoh, Ibukun Mayungbe, Andrea Sutherland, Jessica Beard	4X400-Meter Relay	3:29.72
2014	Brea Garrett	20-Pound Weight Throw	22.15m (72-8)
2021	Jania Martin, Charokee Young, Tierra Robinson-Jones, Athing Mu	4X400-Meter Relay	3:26.68
2021	Tyra Gittens	High Jump	1.90m (6-2 3/4)
2021	Tyra Gittens	Pentathlon	4,746
2022	Lamara Distin	High Jump	1.92m (6-3 1/2
2023	Lamara Distin	High Jump	1.91m (6-3 1/4")
2025	Jaiya Covington	60-Meter Hurdles	7.90

Outdoor
Year	Name	Event	Time/Mark
1989	Melinda Clark	High Jump	1.85 (6-0 3/4)
1998	Rosa Jolivet	400-Meter Hurdles	55.24
2004	Katy Doyle	Javelin Throw	56.57 (185-7)
2006	Clora Williams	400-Meter Dash	51.11
2007	Elizabeth Adeoti, Porscha Lucas, Simone Facey, Tresha Henry	4X100-Meter Relay	43.05
2008	Simone Facey	200-Meter Dash	22.63
2008	Elizabeth Adeoti, Porscha Lucas, Simone Facey, Allison George	4X100-Meter Relay	42.59
2009	Porscha Lucas	200-Meter Dash	22.81
2009	Khrystal Carter, Porscha Lucas, Dominique Duncan, Gabby Mayo	4X100-Meter Relay	42.36
2010	Porscha Lucas	200-Meter Dash	22.83
2010	Jeneba Tarmoh, Porscha Lucas, Dominique Duncan, Elizabeth Adeoti	4X100-Meter Relay	42.82
2011	Jessica Beard	400-Meter Dash	51.10
2011	Jeneba Tarmoh, Ibukun Mayungbe, Andrea Sutherland, Jessica Beard	4X400-Meter Relay	3:26.31
2012	Natosha Rogers	10,000-Meter Run	32:41.63
2014	Kamaria Brown	200-Meter Dash	22.62w
2014	Shamier Little	400-Meter Hurdles	55.07
2014	Shelbi Vaughan	Discus Throw	60.02 (196-11)
2015	Shamier Little	400-Meter Hurdles	53.74
2015	Shelbi Vaughan	Discus Throw	61.39 (201-5)
2016	Shamier Little	400-Meter Hurdles	53.51
2016	Maggie Malone	Javelin Throw	62.19 (204-0)
2018	Sammy Watson	800-Meter Dash	2:04.21
2019	Jazmine Fray	800-Meter Dash	2:01.31
2019	Tierra Robinson-Jones, Jaevin Reed, Jazmine Fray, Syaira Richardson	4X400-Meter Relay	3:25.57
2021	Athing Mu	400-Meter Dash	49.57
2021	Tierra Robinson-Jones, Charokee Young, Jaevin Reed, Athing Mu	4X400-Meter Relay	3:22.34
2021	Tyra Gittens	Heptathlon	6,285
2022	Lamara Distin	High Jump	1.95 (6-4 3/4)
2024	Timara Chapman	Heptathlon	6,339
2025	Winny Bii	Triple Jump	13.96 m

== Individual Honors ==
=== The Bowerman ===
Year	Recipient
2011	Jessica Beard
2021	Athing Mu

=== Conference Coach of the Year ===
(Outdoor)
Year	Recipient	Conference
2007	Pat Henry	Big 12
2008	Pat Henry	Big 12
2009	Pat Henry	Big 12
2010	Pat Henry	Big 12
2011	Pat Henry	Big 12
2013	Pat Henry	SEC

(Indoor)
Year	Recipient	Conference
1998	Ted Nelson	Big 12
2007	Pat Henry	Big 12
2008	Pat Henry	Big 12
2009	Pat Henry	Big 12
2010	Pat Henry	Big 12
2012	Pat Henry	Big 12
2013	Pat Henry	SEC

=== Conference Athlete of the Year ===
(Outdoor)
Year	Recipient	Conference
1997	Anjanette Kirkland	Big 12
2007	Simone Facey	Big 12
2008	Porscha Lucas	Big 12
2011	Jeneba Tarmoh	Big 12
2012	Natosha Rogers	Big 12
2014	Olivia Ekpone	SEC (Runner)
2014	Shelbi Vaughan	SEC (F. Athlete)
2021	Tyra Gittens	SEC (F. Athlete)

(Indoor)
Year	Recipient	Conference
2011	Jessica Beard	Big 12
2014	Kamaria Brown	SEC (Runner)
2021	Athing Mu	SEC (Runner)
2021	Tyra Gittens	SEC (F. Athlete)
2022	Tyra Gittens	SEC (F. Athlete)
2024	Lamara Distin	SEC (F. Athlete)

== Olympic Medalists ==
Year	Recipient	Event	Medal Type
2012	Jeneba Tarmoh	4X100m Relay	Gold
2016	Simone Facey	4X100m Relay	Silver
2020	Athing Mu	800m	Gold
2020	Athing Mu	4X400m Relay	Gold
2024	Shamier Little	4X400m Relay	Gold
2024	Shamier Little	4X400m Relay Mixed	Silver

== See also ==
- Texas A&M Aggies
