= Texas A&M Aggies men's track and field =

Texas A&M Mens Track & Field

Texas A&M Aggies Men's Track & Field
- University: Texas A&M University
- Athletic director: Trev Alberts
- Head coach: Leroy Burrell (1st season)
- Conference: SEC
- Location: College Station, Texas, US
- Indoor track: Fasken Indoor Track & Field
- Outdoor track: E.B. Cushing Stadium
- Nickname: Aggies
- Colors: Maroon and White

NCAA Indoor National Championships
- 2017

NCAA Outdoor National Championships
- 2009, 2010, 2011, 2013, 2025

NCAA Indoor Tournament Appearances
- 1965, 1978, 1979, 1980, 1981, 1982, 1984, 1985, 1986, 1988, 1989, 1990, 1991, 1993, 1994, 1995, 1996, 1998, 2000, 2001, 2002, 2003, 2004, 2006, 2007, 2008, 2009, 2010, 2011, 2012, 2013, 2014, 2015, 2016, 2017, 2018, 2019, 2021, 2022, 2023, 2024, 2025, 2026

NCAA Outdoor Tournament Appearances
- 1921, 1922, 1929, 1933, 1934, 1946, 1947, 1948, 1951, 1952, 1953, 1954, 1957, 1966, 1967, 1969, 1971, 1975, 1978, 1979, 1980, 1981, 1982, 1983, 1984, 1985, 1986, 1987, 1988, 1989, 1990, 1991, 1992, 1993, 1994, 1995, 1996, 1997, 1998, 1999, 2000, 2001, 2002, 2003, 2004, 2005, 2006, 2007, 2008, 2009, 2010, 2011, 2012, 2013, 2014, 2015, 2016, 2017, 2018, 2019, 2021, 2022, 2023, 2024, 2025, 2026

Conference Indoor Championships
- SWC; 1980 Big 12; 2011, 2012 SEC; 2025

Conference Outdoor Championships
- SWC; 1921, 1922, 1929, 1930, 1943, 1947, 1948, 1949, 1951, 1952, 1953, 1970, 1978, 1980, 1981 Big 12; 2001, 2011, 2012 SEC; 2014, 2017

The Texas A&M Aggies men's track and field program represents the Texas A&M University in NCAA Division I intercollegiate men's track and field competition. The Aggies compete in the Southeastern Conference

Texas A&M would begin both NCAA & conference competition on 1921 as a member of the Southwest Conference. The Aggies would compete in the SWC until the conferences dissolution following the 1996 season. The Aggies Success during this period would primarily come under the leadership of Frank "Col. Andy" Anderson and Charlie Thomas. During these two coaches tenures Texas A&M would win 13 SWC Outdoor Championships as well as 1 SWC Indoor championship.

After leaving the SWC, the Aggies Joined the Big 12 Conference, where they would stay through the 2011 season. After which, Texas A&M would Leave and Join the Southeastern Conference. The Aggies remain in the SEC today.

The majority of the Aggies success came under head coach Pat Henry. Under Henry the Aggies have won all of their 5 National Outdoor Titles as well as their only National Indoor title. At the conference level, The Aggies won 5 Big 12 Championships and 3 SEC Championships. In 2017 Pat Henry was inducted into the Texas Track & Field Hall of Fame.

1 Aggie Has won The Bowerman Award: Deon Lendore in 2014. The Bowerman is an award that honors collegiate track & field's most outstanding athlete of the year.

== Head coaches ==
#	Coach	Years	Seasons	National Championships		Conference Championships	
#	Coach	Years	Seasons	Indoor	Outdoor	Indoor	Outdoor
1	Jimmy Clutter	1914–1915, 1920	3	0	0	0	0
2	Charles E. Firth	1916–1918	3	0	0	0	0
3	Hec Edmundson	1919	1	0	0	0	0
4	C.J. Rothgeb	1921	1	0	0	0	1
5	Frank Anderson	1922–1935, 1946-1957	26	0	0	0	9
6	John "Dough" Rollins	1936–1942	7	0	0	0	0
7	Lilburn "Lil" Dimmitt	1943–1945	3	0	0	0	1
8	Ray Putnam	1958	1	0	0	0	0
9	Charlie Thomas	1959–1989	30	0	0	1	4
10	Ted Nelson	1990–2004	14	0	0	0	0
11	Pat Henry	2005–2026	22	1	5	3	5
12	Leroy Burrell	2027–present	1	0	0	0	0
Total			112	1	5	4	19

== Yearly record ==
Legend
National champions
Conference champions

Season	Coach	NCAA		Conference	
Season	Coach	Indoor	Outdoor	Indoor	Outdoor
Jimmy Clutter (Independent) (1914–1915)
1914	Jimmy Clutter				
1915	Jimmy Clutter				3
Charles E. Firth (SWC) (1916–1918)
1916	Charles E. Firth				2
1917	Charles E. Firth				
1918	Charles E. Firth				
Hec Edmundson (SWC) (1919)
1919	Hec Edmundson				5
Jimmy Clutter (SWC) (1920)
1920	Jimmy Clutter				
C.J. Rothgeb (SWC) (1921)
1921	C.J. Rothgeb		T-29		1
Frank Anderson (SWC) (1922–1935)
1922	Frank Anderson		T-28		1
1923	Frank Anderson		DNQ		2
1924	Frank Anderson		DNQ		2
1925	Frank Anderson		DNQ		2
1926	Frank Anderson		DNQ		2
1927	Frank Anderson		DNQ		2
1928	Frank Anderson		DNQ		3
1929	Frank Anderson		T-29		1
1930	Frank Anderson		DNQ		1
1931	Frank Anderson		DNQ		2
1932	Frank Anderson		DNQ		3
1933	Frank Anderson		T-34		2
1934	Frank Anderson		T-20		2
1935	Frank Anderson		DNQ		2
John W. "Dough" Rollins (SWC) (1936–1942)
1936	John W. "Dough" Rollins		DNQ		3
1937	John W. "Dough" Rollins		DNQ		3
1938	John W. "Dough" Rollins		DNQ		
1939	John W. "Dough" Rollins		DNQ		3
1940	John W. "Dough" Rollins		DNQ		4
1941	John W. "Dough" Rollins		DNQ		3
1942	John W. "Dough" Rollins		DNQ		2
Lilburn. "Lil" Dimmitt (SWC) (1943–1945)
1943	Lilburn "Lil" Dimmitt		DNQ		1
1944	Lilburn "Lil" Dimmitt		DNQ		2
1945	Lilburn "Lil" Dimmitt		DNQ		2
Frank Anderson (SWC) (1946–1957)
1946	Frank Anderson		T-24		2
1947	Frank Anderson		T-33		1
1948	Frank Anderson		12		1
1949	Frank Anderson		DNQ		1
1950	Frank Anderson		DNQ		2
1951	Frank Anderson		8		1
1952	Frank Anderson		12		1
1953	Frank Anderson		5		1
1954	Frank Anderson		T-40		2
1955	Frank Anderson		DNQ		2
1956	Frank Anderson		DNQ		2
1957	Frank Anderson		T-42		2
Ray Putnam (SWC) (1958)
1958	Ray Putnam		DNQ		
Charlie Thomas (SWC) (1959–1989)
1959	Charlie Thomas		DNQ		3
1960	Charlie Thomas		DNQ		
1961	Charlie Thomas		DNQ		
1962	Charlie Thomas		DNQ		
1963	Charlie Thomas		DNQ		
1963	Charlie Thomas		DNQ		
1965	Charlie Thomas	T-13	DNQ		
1966	Charlie Thomas	DNQ	T-8		
1967	Charlie Thomas	DNQ	T-10		
1968	Charlie Thomas	DNQ	DNQ		4
1969	Charlie Thomas	DNQ	T-13		3
1970	Charlie Thomas	DNQ	T-31		1
1971	Charlie Thomas	DNQ	T-52		2
1972	Charlie Thomas	DNQ	DNQ		
1973	Charlie Thomas	DNQ	DNQ		2
1974	Charlie Thomas	DNQ	DNQ		2
1975	Charlie Thomas	DNQ	T-51		3
1976	Charlie Thomas	DNQ	DNQ		3
1977	Charlie Thomas	DNQ	DNQ	3	2
1978	Charlie Thomas	T-21	T-23		1
1979	Charlie Thomas	12	T-11		2
1980	Charlie Thomas	7	T-15	1	1
1981	Charlie Thomas	T-27	20	3	1
1982	Charlie Thomas	T-14	T-53		
1983	Charlie Thomas	DNQ	28		5
1984	Charlie Thomas	T-12	36		6
1985	Charlie Thomas	T-22	T-24		5
1986	Charlie Thomas	T-31	6	2	
1987	Charlie Thomas	DNQ	T-6		
1988	Charlie Thomas	T-50	4	6	3
1989	Charlie Thomas	3	2		3
Ted Nelson (SWC) (1990–1996)
1990	Ted Nelson	T-3	T-11		
1991	Ted Nelson	14	T-11		4
1992	Ted Nelson	DNQ	T-50		2
1993	Ted Nelson	T-30	T-36		
1994	Ted Nelson	T-19	T-48		2
1995	Ted Nelson	T-56	T-28		
1996	Ted Nelson	T-18	T-19		
Ted Nelson (Big 12) (1997–2004)
1997	Ted Nelson	DNQ	16	11	4
1998	Ted Nelson	T-61	T-19	2	8
1999	Ted Nelson	DNQ	T-71	10	3
2000	Ted Nelson	T-34	16	5	3
2001	Ted Nelson	19	T-10	2	1
2002	Ted Nelson	T-23	T-39	8	5
2003	Ted Nelson	T-32	T-11	5	2
2004	Ted Nelson	T-56	T-38	7	3
Pat Henry (Big 12) (2005–2012)
2005	Pat Henry	DNQ	T-29	10	6
2006	Pat Henry	T-25	T-20	9	6
2007	Pat Henry	T-32	T-24	9	9
2008	Pat Henry	T-10	5	4	2
2009	Pat Henry	9	1	3	2
2010	Pat Henry	T-2	1	3	3
2011	Pat Henry	2	1	1	1
2012	Pat Henry	T-8	3	1	1
Pat Henry (SEC) (2013–2026)
2013	Pat Henry	4	1	3	3
2014	Pat Henry	T-8	3	3	1
2015	Pat Henry	4	6	3	T-2
2016	Pat Henry	10	3	2	2
2017	Pat Henry	1	2	T-3	1
2018	Pat Henry	5	7	4	2
2019	Pat Henry	11	6	5	4
2020	Pat Henry	Cancelled due to the COVID-19 pandemic			
2021	Pat Henry	31	T-6	9	6
2022	Pat Henry	5	T-25	9	6
2023	Pat Henry	32	22	10	5
2024	Pat Henry	6	5	3	3
2025	Pat Henry	10	1	1	4
2026	Pat Henry	6	11	3	4
Leroy Burrell (SEC) (2027–Present)
2027	Leroy Burrell	TBD	TBD	TBD	TBD

== NCAA Individual Event Champions ==
Indoor
Year	Name	Event	Time/Mark
1965	Randy Matson	Shot Put	63-2¼
1978	Curtis Dickey	55-Meter Dash*	6.15
1979	Curtis Dickey	55-Meter Dash*	6.15
1980	Curtis Dickey	55-Meter Dash*	6.12
1980	Randy Hall	Pole Vault	5.42 (17-9½)
1982	Rod Richardson	55-Meter Dash*	6.07
1984	Rod Richardson	55-Meter Dash*	6.14
1989	Mike Stulce	Shot Put	20.81 (68-3¼)
1990	Andre Cason	55-Meter Dash*	6.07
1994	Stacy Zamzow, Mike Miller, Dante Bolden, Danny McCray	4x400-Meter Relay	3:06.51
1998	Larry Wade	55-Meter High Hurdles*	7.11
2010	Curtis Mitchell	200-Meter Dash	20.38
2010	Demetrius Pinder, Bryan Miller, Tabarie Henry, Curtis Mitchell	4x400-Meter Relay	3:04.40
2011	Ameer Webb	200-Meter Dash	20.57
2011	Demetrius Pinder	400-Meter Dash	45.33
2011	Tran Howell, Demetrius Pinder, Bryan Miller, Tabarie Henry	4x400-Meter Relay	3:04.24
2012	Ameer Webb	200-Meter Dash	20.42
2014	Deon Lendore	400-Meter Dash	45.21
2015	Gregory Coleman, Bralon Taplin, Shavez Hart, Deon Lendore	4x400-Meter Relay	3:02.86
2017	Fred Kerley	400-Meter Dash	44.85
2017	Fred Kerley, Robert Grant, Devin Dixon, Mylik Kerley	4x400-Meter Relay	3:02.80
2018	Will Williams	Long Jump	8.19 (26-10½)
2022	Brandon Miller	800-Meter Dash	1:47.19
2022	Brandon Miller, Omajuwa Etiwe, Chevannie Hanson, Emmanuel Bamidele	4x400-Meter Relay	3:04.16

Outdoor
Year	Name	Event	Time/Mark
1951	Darrow Hooper	Shot Put	53‑11
1952	Walt Davis	High Jump	6‑8
1966	Randy Matson	Shot Put	67‑1½
1966	Randy Matson	Discus Throw	197‑0
1967	Randy Matson	Shot Put	67‑9¼
1967	Randy Matson	Discus Throw	190‑4
1969	Curtis Mills	400‑Meter Dash	44.7
1980	Randy Hall	Pole Vault	5.54(18‑2¼)
1986	Floyd Heard	200‑Meter Dash	20.34
1987	Floyd Heard	200‑Meter Dash	20.03w
1988	Lawrence Felton, Derrick Florence, Andre Cason, Stanley Kerr	4x100‑Meter Relay	38.84
1988	Mike Stulce	Shot Put	18.99 (62‑3¾)
1989	Mike Stulce	Shot Put	21.02 (68‑11¾)
1989	Stanley Kerr, Errington Lindo, Derrick Florence, Howard Davis	4x400‑Meter Relay	3:00.91
1991	Greg Williams	110‑Meter High Hurdles	13.55w
1997	Michael Price, Toya Jones, Billy Fobbs, Danny McCray	4x100‑Meter Relay	38.80
1998	Larry Wade	110‑Meter High Hurdles	13.37w
2001	Tolga Koseoglu	Discus Throw	62.43 (204‑10)
2005	Fabrice Lapierre	Long Jump	8.15w (26‑9)
2010	Tran Howell, Demetrius Pinder, Bryan Miller, Tabarie Henry	4x400‑Meter Relay	3:00.89
2011	Bryan Miller, Demetrius Pinder, Michael Preble, Tabarie Henry	4x400‑Meter Relay	3:00.62
2013	Ameer Webb	200‑Meter Dash	20.10w
2013	Sam Humphreys	Javelin Throw	77.95 (255-9)
2013	Wayne Davis	110‑Meter High Hurdles	13.14w
2014	Aldrich Bailey, Carlyle Roudette, Bralon Taplin, Deon Lendore	4x400‑Meter Relay	2:59.60
2014	Deon Lendore	400‑Meter Dash	45.02
2016	Donavan Brazier	800‑Meter Run	1:43.55
2016	Latario Collie	Triple Jump	16.97 (55-8¼)
2016	Lindon Victor	Decathlon	8,379
2017	Fred Kerley	400‑Meter Dash	44.10
2017	Ioannis Kyriazis	Javelin Throw	82.58 (270-11)
2017	Lindon Victor	Decathlon	8,390
2017	Richard Rose, Mylik Kerley, Robert Grant, Fred Kerley	4x400‑Meter Relay	2:59.98
2018	Tahar Triki	Triple Jump	16.79 (55-1)
2019	Bryce Deadmon, Robert Grant, Kyree Johnson, Devin Dixon	4x400‑Meter Relay	2:59.05
2024	Kimar Farquharson, Jevon O'Bryant, Auhmad Robinson, Cutler Zamzow	4x400‑Meter Relay	2:58.37
2025	Aleksandr Solovyov	Pole Vault	5.78(18 ft 11½)
2025	Sam Whitmarsh	800-Meter Dash	1:45.86
2026	Zaza Nnamdi	Javelin Throw	82.26 (269-10)

== Individual Honors ==
=== The Bowerman ===
Year	Recipient
2014	Deon Lendore

=== Conference Coach of the Year ===
(Outdoor)
Year	Recipient	Conference
2001	Ted Nelson	Big 12
2011	Pat Henry	Big 12
2014	Pat Henry	SEC
2017	Pat Henry	SEC

(Indoor)
Year	Recipient	Conference
1998	Ted Nelson	Big 12
2011	Pat Henry	Big 12
2012	Pat Henry	Big 12
2025	Pat Henry	SEC

=== Conference Athlete of the Year ===
(Outdoor)
Year	Recipient	Conference
2000	Bashir Ramzy	Big 12
2001	Bashir Ramzy	Big 12
2012	Prezel Hardy	Big 12
2014	Deon Lendore	SEC (Runner)
2015	Deon Lendore	SEC (Runner)
2016	Lindon Victor	SEC (F. Athlete)
2017	Lindon Victor	SEC (F. Athlete)

(Indoor)
Year	Recipient	Conference
2001	Brandon Evans	Big 12
2012	Ameer Webb	Big 12
2013	Deon Lendore	SEC (Runner)
2017	Fred Kerley	SEC (Runner)
2022	Brandon Miller	SEC (Runner)

== Olympic Medalists ==
Year	Recipient	Event	Medal Type
1948	Art Harnden	4X400m Relay	Gold
1952	Darrow Hooper	Shot Put	Silver
1952	Walt Davis	High Jump	Gold
1964	Randy Matson	Shot Put	Silver
1968	Randy Matson	Shot Put	Gold
1988	Howard Davis	4X400m Relay	Silver
1988	Randy Barnes	Shot Put	Silver
1992	Mike Stulce	Shot Put	Gold
1996	Randy Barnes	Shot Put	Gold
2012	Demetrius Pinder	4X400m Relay	Gold
2012	Deon Lendore	4X400m Relay	Bronze
2020	Bryce Deadmon	4X400m Relay Mixed	Bronze
2020	Bryce Deadmon	4X400m Relay	Gold
2020	Fred Kerley	100m	Silver
2024	Bryce Deadmon	4X400m Relay Mixed	Silver
2024	Bryce Deadmon	4X400m Relay	Gold
2024	Fred Kerley	100m	Bronze
2024	Lindon Victor	Decathlon	Bronze

== See also ==
- Texas A&M Aggies
