= Lamara Distin =

Jamaican high jumper

- Lamara Distin at the Wanda Diamond League’s 2026 Weltklasse Zürich.

Personal information
- Born: 3 March 2000 (age 26) Hanover Parish, Jamaica

Sport
- Sport: Track and field
- Event: High jump
- College team: Texas A&M Aggies
Medal record
Women's athletics
Representing Jamaica
Commonwealth Games
Gold medal – first place	2022 Birmingham	High jump
Pan American U20 Championships
Silver medal – second place	2019 San José	High jump
NACAC U23 Championships
Gold medal – first place	2021 San José	High jump
Carifta Games Junior (U20)
Gold medal – first place	2018 Nassau	High jump
Carifta Games Youth (U18)
Silver medal – second place	2016 St. George's	High jump

Lamara Distin (born 3 March 2000) is a Jamaican high jumper who won the gold medal at the 2022 Commonwealth Games. She is the Jamaican national record holder in the high jump. She represented Jamaica at the 2024 Summer Olympics.

== Career ==
Distin began her athletics career running in the 200, 400, and 800 metres in primary school. When she reached high school, she switched to high jump after a coach recommended it. She competed for Hydel High School and was the 2019 Jamaican high school national champion in the high jump and the triple jump. She won a gold medal at the 2018 CARIFTA Games in the high jump. She joined the Texas A&M Aggies track & field team in 2020.

At the 2022 Alumni Master, Distin jumped 1.97 metres to set a new Jamaican national record. She went on to win the 2022 NCAA Outdoor Championships. She represented Jamaica at the 2022 Commonwealth Games and won the high jump title after being the only athlete to clear the 1.95 metre jump. At the 2022 World Athletics Championships, she advanced into the finals and finished ninth.

Distin finished second at the 2023 NCAA Outdoor Championships. She won the Jamaican national title and secured a spot at the 2023 World Athletics Championships. There, she finished fifth after missing three attempts at the 1.97 metre jump.

Distin finished second to Rachel Glenn at the 2024 NCAA Indoor Championships after missing three attempts at a 2.00 metre jump. She then finished fourth at the 2024 NCAA Outdoor Championships. She represented Jamaica at the 2024 Summer Olympics but did not advance out of the qualification round, finishing 24th.

Distin advanced into the 2026 World Athletics Indoor Championships high jump final and finished tenth.

== Personal life ==
Distin was born and raised in the Hanover Parish in Jamaica.
