= 2010 NCAA Division I Outdoor Track and Field Championships =

Collegiate track and field event

- Edition: 89th (Men); 29th (Women)
- Dates: June 9–12, 2010
- Host city: Eugene, Oregon; University of Oregon
- Venue: Hayward Field
- Events: 36

The 2010 NCAA Division I Outdoor Track and Field Championships were the 89th NCAA Division I Men's Outdoor Track and Field Championships and the 29th NCAA Division I Women's Outdoor Track and Field Championships at Hayward Field in Eugene, Oregon on the campus of the University of Oregon from June 9–12, 2010.

In total, thirty-six different men's and women's track and field events were contested.

== Results ==
=== Men's events ===
==== 100 meters ====
- Final results shown, not prelims

Wind: +2.5

Rank	Name	University	Time	Notes
1st place, gold medalist(s)	Jeff Demps	Florida	9.96	
2nd place, silver medalist(s)	Rondel Sorrillo Trinidad and Tobago	Kentucky	10.09	
3rd place, bronze medalist(s)	Luther Ambrose	UL-Monroe	10.12	
4	Gerald Phiri Zambia	Texas A&M	10.20	
5	Rakieem Salaam	Oklahoma	10.21	
6	Curtis Mitchell	Texas A&M	10.23	
7	Reggie Dixon	Hampton	10.39	
8	Marcus Rowland	Auburn	10.61	

==== 200 meters ====
- Final results shown, not prelims

Wind: +3.7

Rank	Name	University	Time	Notes
1st place, gold medalist(s)	Rondel Sorrillo Trinidad and Tobago	Kentucky	20.36	
2nd place, silver medalist(s)	Curtis Mitchell	Texas A&M	20.45	
3rd place, bronze medalist(s)	Brandon Byram	Florida State	20.54	
4	Evander Wells	Tennessee	20.61	
5	Jeremy Dodson	Colorado	20.65	
6	Bruce Owens	Rutgers	20.68	
7	Marvin Bonde	Oral Roberts	20.68	
8	Gerald Phiri Zambia	Texas A&M	20.91	

==== 400 meters ====
- Final results shown, not prelims

Rank	Name	University	Time	Notes
1st place, gold medalist(s)	Kirani James Grenada	Alabama	45.05	
2nd place, silver medalist(s)	Donald Sanford Israel	Arizona State	45.21	
3rd place, bronze medalist(s)	Joey Hughes	USC	45.23	
4	Calvin Smith	Florida	45.37	
5	Tavaris Tate	Mississippi St.	45.56	
6	Demetrius Pinder Bahamas	Texas A&M	45.56	
7	Kevin Borlée Belgium	Florida State	45.80	
8	Tabarie Henry United States Virgin Islands	Texas A&M	45.92	

==== 800 meters ====
- Final results shown, not prelims

Rank	Name	University	Time	Notes
1st place, gold medalist(s)	Andrew Wheating	Oregon	1:45.69	
2nd place, silver medalist(s)	Robby Andrews	Virginia	1:46.83	
3rd place, bronze medalist(s)	Aaron Evans	Georgia	1:46.87	
4	Ryan Martin	UC Santa Barbara	1:47.02	
5	Cory Primm	UCLA	1:47.58	
6	Lance Roller	Virginia	1:47.64	
7	Chris Gowell	Baylor	1:47.67	
8	Fred Samoei	Alabama	1:47.84	

==== 1500 meters ====
- Only top eight final results shown; no prelims are listed

Rank	Name	University	Time	Notes
1st place, gold medalist(s)	Andrew Wheating	Oregon	3:47.94	
2nd place, silver medalist(s)	A.J. Acosta	Oregon	3:48.01	
3rd place, bronze medalist(s)	Matthew Centrowitz	Oregon	3:48.08	
4	Jack Bolas	Wisconsin	3:48.21	
5	Jeff See	Ohio State	3:48.37	
6	Lee Emanuel United Kingdom	New Mexico	3:48.61	
7	Craig Miller	Wisconsin	3:48.85	
8	Mark Matusak	California	3:48.91	

==== 5000 meters ====
- Only top eight final results shown

Rank	Name	University	Time	Notes
1st place, gold medalist(s)	David McNeill Australia	Northern Arizona	13:44.81	
2nd place, silver medalist(s)	Sam Chelanga	Liberty	13:45.35	
3rd place, bronze medalist(s)	Andrew Bumbalough	Georgetown	13:46.17	
4	Chris Derrick	Stanford	13:49.11	
5	William Mulherin	Virginia Tech	13:50.76	
6	Donn Cabral	Princeton	13:53.33	
7	Ryan Hill	North Carolina St.	13:53.99	
8	Jordan McNamara	Oregon	13:54.30	

==== 10,000 meters ====
- Only top eight final results shown

Rank	Name	University	Time	Notes
1st place, gold medalist(s)	Sam Chelanga	Liberty	28:37.40	
2nd place, silver medalist(s)	John Kosgei	Oklahoma State	28:55.93	
3rd place, bronze medalist(s)	Jake Riley	Stanford	28:57.41	
4	Mohammed Ahmed Canada	Wisconsin	28:57.44	
5	Kiel Uhl	Iowa State	28:58.55	
6	Joe Bosshard	Colorado	28:59.87	
7	Ben Cheruiyot	Auburn	29:09.09	
8	Alfred Kipchumba	Portland	29:09.63	

==== 110 meters hurdles ====
- Final results shown, not prelims

Wind: +0.7

Rank	Name	University	Time	Notes
1st place, gold medalist(s)	Andrew Riley Jamaica	Illinois	13.45	
2nd place, silver medalist(s)	Barrett Nugent	LSU	13.49	
3rd place, bronze medalist(s)	Ronnie Ash	Oklahoma	13.51	
4	Oscar Spurlock	USC	13.58	
5	Jeffrey Julmis Haiti	Kansas State	13.61	
6	Lehann Fourie South Africa	Nebraska	13.68	
7	Keiron Stewart	Texas	13.97	
	Johnny Dutch	South Carolina	NT	

==== 400 meters hurdles ====
- Final results shown, not prelims

Rank	Name	University	Time	Notes
1st place, gold medalist(s)	Johnny Dutch	South Carolina	48.75	
2nd place, silver medalist(s)	Jeshua Anderson	Washington St.	49.31	
3rd place, bronze medalist(s)	Amaechi Morton Nigeria	Stanford	49.56	
4	Bryce Brown	Texas Tech	50.11	
5	David Aristil	South Florida	51.05	
6	Emanuel Mayers	Mississippi St.	51.39	
7	Jamele Mason Puerto Rico	Texas Tech	51.46	
8	Reggie Wyatt	USC	53.99	

==== 3000 meter steeplechase ====
- Only top eight final results shown

Rank	Name	University	Time	Notes
1st place, gold medalist(s)	Matt Hughes Canada	Louisville	8:34.18	
2nd place, silver medalist(s)	Donn Cabral	Princeton	8:38.90	
3rd place, bronze medalist(s)	Hillary Bor	Iowa State	8:39.11	
4	John Sullivan	Stanford	8:42.97	
5	Gilbert Limo	Texas Tech	8:43.70	
6	Steve Sodaro	California	8:44.06	
7	Joonas Harjamaki Finland	Lamar	8:44.58	
8	Richard Nelson	BYU	8:45.63	

==== 4 × 100 meters relay ====
- Final results shown, not prelims

Rank	University	Members	Time	Notes
1st place, gold medalist(s)	Florida	Chris Rainey, Jeremy Hall, Terrell Wilks, Jeff Demps	39.04	
2nd place, silver medalist(s)	Florida State	David Ambler New Zealand, Brandon Byram, Maurice Mitchell, Madanha Chibudu Canada	39.07	
3rd place, bronze medalist(s)	LSU	Barrett Nugent, Will Coppage, Armanti Hayes, Gabriel Mvumvure Zimbabwe	39.27	
4	South Carolina	Andre Carter, Antonio Sales, Quentin Moore, Obakeng Ngwigwa Botswana	39.87	
5	Auburn	Stephen Fly, Harry Adams, Michael DeHaven, Marcus Rowland	40.44	

Note: Only finishing teams

==== 4 × 400 meters relay ====
- Final results shown, not prelims

Rank	University	Members	Time	Notes
1st place, gold medalist(s)	Texas A&M	Tran Howell, Demetrius Pinder Bahamas, Bryan Miller, Tabarie Henry United States Virgin Islands	3:00.89	
2nd place, silver medalist(s)	Mississippi State	O'Neal Wilder, Dwight Mullings Jamaica, Emanuel Mayers Trinidad and Tobago, Tavaris Tate	3:01.66	
3rd place, bronze medalist(s)	Florida	R.J. Anderson, Tony McQuay, Christian Taylor, Calvin Smith	3:01.87	
4	South Carolina	Obakeng Ngwigwa Botswana, Quentin Moore, Johnny Dutch, Aaron Anderson	3:03.58	
5	USC	Joey Hughes, Nate Anderson, Jason Price, Reggie Wyatt	3:04.54	
6	Baylor	James Gilreath, Thaddeus Gordon, Michael Liggins, Zwede Hewitt Trinidad and Tobago	3:04.85	
7	Iowa	Patrick Richards, Steven Willey, Erik Sowinski, Chris Barton	3:05.61	
8	Arizona State	Justin Kremer, Ray Miller, Donald Sanford Israel, Joel Phillip	3:05.65	

==== High jump ====
- Only top eight final results shown

Rank	Name	University	Height	Notes
1st place, gold medalist(s)	Derek Drouin Canada	Indiana	2.26 m (7 ft 4 3/4 in)	
2nd place, silver medalist(s)	Manjula Kumara Wijesekara Sri Lanka	USC	2.23 m (7 ft 3 3/4 in)	
3rd place, bronze medalist(s)	Paul Hamilton	Nebraska	2.23 m (7 ft 3 3/4 in)	
4	Ryan Fritz	Penn State	2.20 m (7 ft 2 1/2 in)	
5	Ricky Robertson	Mississippi	2.20 m (7 ft 2 1/2 in)	
6	Erik Kynard	Kansas State	2.17 m (7 ft 1 1/4 in)	
7	Darrell Roddick	Texas Tech	2.17 m (7 ft 1 1/4 in)	
8	Nick Ross	Arizona	2.17 m (7 ft 1 1/4 in)	

==== Pole vault ====
- Only top eight final results shown

Rank	Name	University	Height	Notes
1st place, gold medalist(s)	Jordan Scott	Kansas	5.40 m (17 ft 8 1/2 in)	
2nd place, silver medalist(s)	Josh Dominguez	LSU	5.40 m (17 ft 8 1/2 in)	
3rd place, bronze medalist(s)	Nick Frawley	Air Force	5.30 m (17 ft 4 1/2 in)	
4	Scott Roth	Washington	5.30 m (17 ft 4 1/2 in)	
5	Jeffrey Coover	Indiana	5.30 m (17 ft 4 1/2 in)	
6	Brandon Estrada Puerto Rico	USC	5.30 m (17 ft 4 1/2 in)	
7	Jared Jodon	Virginia Tech	5.30 m (17 ft 4 1/2 in)	
8	Yavgeniy Olhovsky Israel	Virginia Tech	5.30 m (17 ft 4 1/2 in)	

==== Long jump ====
- Only top eight final results shown

Rank	Name	University	Distance	Wind	Notes
1st place, gold medalist(s)	Marquise Goodwin	Texas	8.15 m (26 ft 8 3/4 in)	+1.0	
2nd place, silver medalist(s)	Stanley Gbagbeke Nigeria	Mid. Tenn. State	7.96 m (26 ft 1 1/4 in)	+1.2	
3rd place, bronze medalist(s)	Reindell Cole	Cal St. Northridge	7.90 m (25 ft 11 in)	+2.0	
4	Christian Taylor	Florida	7.77 m (25 ft 5 3/4 in)	+2.0	
5	Chris Phipps	Nebraska	7.73 m (25 ft 4 1/4 in)	-0.6	
6	Madanha Chibudu Canada	Florida State	7.73 m (25 ft 4 1/4 in)	+2.4	7.40m (+0.8)
7	Andrejs Maskancevs	Western Kentucky	7.64 m (25 ft 3/4 in)	+2.3	7.54m (+1.4)
8	Nicholas Gordon	Nebraska	7.60 m (24 ft 11 in)	+0.8	

==== Triple jump ====
- Only top eight final results shown

Rank	Name	University	Distance	Wind	Notes
1st place, gold medalist(s)	Christian Taylor	Florida	17.09 m (56 ft 3/4 in)	+2.9	17.02m (+0.9)
2nd place, silver medalist(s)	Tyron Stewart	Texas A&M	16.38 m (53 ft 8 3/4 in)	+3.2	16.12m (+2.0)
3rd place, bronze medalist(s)	Zuheir Sharif	Texas A&M	16.30 m (53 ft 5 1/2 in)	+1.7	
4	Andre Black	Louisville	16.26 m (53 ft 4 in)	+1.9	
5	Devon Bond	UTSA	16.20 m (53 ft 1 3/4 in)	+3.6	15.01m (+1.5)
6	Omar Craddock	Florida	16.13 m (52 ft 11 in)	+2.3	16.02m (+1.1)
7	Zedric Thomas	LSU	16.12 m (52 ft 10 1/2 in)	+1.3	
8	Alphonso Jordan	Georgia Tech	15.93 m (52 ft 3 in)	+1.9	

==== Shot put ====
- Only top eight final results shown

Rank	Name	University	Distance	Notes
1st place, gold medalist(s)	Ryan Whiting	Arizona State	21.97 m (72 ft 3/4 in)	
2nd place, silver medalist(s)	Mason Finley	Kansas	20.68 m (67 ft 10 in)	
3rd place, bronze medalist(s)	Blake Eaton	Penn State	19.57 m (64 ft 2 1/4 in)	
4	Kemal Mesic Bosnia and Herzegovina	Florida	19.42 m (63 ft 8 1/2 in)	
5	Jordan Clarke	Arizona State	19.21 m (63 ft 1/4 in)	
6	Hayden Baillio	Texas	18.78 m (61 ft 7 1/4 in)	
7	Jason Lewis	Arizona State	18.77 m (61 ft 6 3/4 in)	
8	Matt DeChant	Ohio State	18.54 m (60 ft 9 3/4 in)	

==== Discus ====
- Only top eight final results shown

Rank	Name	University	Distance	Notes
1st place, gold medalist(s)	Ryan Whiting	Arizona State	59.06 m (193 ft 9 in)	
2nd place, silver medalist(s)	Mason Finley	Kansas	58.35 m (191 ft 5 in)	
3rd place, bronze medalist(s)	Julian Wruck Australia	Texas Tech	58.03 m (190 ft 4 1/2 in)	
4	Adonson Shallow	SE Louisiana	56.60 m (185 ft 8 1/4 in)	
5	Aaron Dan	USC	56.14 m (184 ft 2 in)	
6	Michael Putman	Florida State	56.03 m (183 ft 9 3/4 in)	
7	Jason Lewis	Arizona State	55.72 m (182 ft 9 1/2 in)	
8	Jake Deiters	Southern Illinois	55.23 m (181 ft 2 1/4 in)	

==== Javelin throw ====
- Only top eight final results shown

Rank	Name	University	Distance	Notes
1st place, gold medalist(s)	Craig Kinsley	Brown	76.29 m (250 ft 3 1/2 in)	
2nd place, silver medalist(s)	Pontus Thomee	Boise State	73.60 m (241 ft 5 1/2 in)	
3rd place, bronze medalist(s)	Kyle Nielsen	Washington	73.60 m (241 ft 5 1/2 in)	
4	Joe Zimmerman	Washington	71.19 m (233 ft 6 3/4 in)	
5	Sam Humphreys	Texas A&M	70.32 m (230 ft 8 1/2 in)	
6	Sam Vidrine	McNeese State	69.99 m (229 ft 7 1/2 in)	
7	Adam Wolkins	Nebraska	69.64 m (228 ft 5 1/2 in)	
8	Colin Moleton	Mississippi	69.32 m (227 ft 5 in)	

==== Hammer throw ====
- Only top eight final results shown

Rank	Name	University	Distance	Notes
1st place, gold medalist(s)	Walter Henning	LSU	72.79 m (238 ft 9 1/2 in)	
2nd place, silver medalist(s)	Alexander Ziegler Germany	Virginia Tech	72.43 m (237 ft 7 1/2 in)	
3rd place, bronze medalist(s)	Marcel Lomnicky Slovakia	Virginia Tech	70.97 m (232 ft 10 in)	
4	Steffen Nerdal Norway	Memphis	69.86 m (229 ft 2 1/4 in)	
5	Trey Henderson Canada	USC	66.89 m (219 ft 5 1/4 in)	
6	Dimitrios Fylladitakis Greece	UTEP	66.77 m (219 ft 1/2 in)	
7	Brad Millar	DePaul	64.99 m (213 ft 2 1/2 in)	
8	Timothy Morse	Radford	64.80 m (212 ft 7 in)	

==== Decathlon ====
- Only top eight final results shown

Rank	Name	University	Score	Notes
1st place, gold medalist(s)	Ashton Eaton	Oregon	8457	
2nd place, silver medalist(s)	Michael Morrison	California	7801	
3rd place, bronze medalist(s)	Trinity Otto	Texas A&M	7724	
4	Lars Rise Norway	Missouri	7671	
5	Nick Adcock	Missouri	7569	
6	Daniel Kinsey	Akron	7524	
7	Nick Trubachik	Portland State	7510	
8	Mateo Sossah France	North Carolina	7509	

=== Women's events ===
==== 100 meters ====
- Final results shown, not prelims

Wind +2.8

Rank	Name	University	Time	Notes
1st place, gold medalist(s)	Blessing Okagbare Nigeria	UTEP	10.98	
2nd place, silver medalist(s)	Porscha Lucas	Texas A&M	11.12	
3rd place, bronze medalist(s)	Jeneba Tarmoh	Texas A&M	11.13	
4	Takeia Pinckney	LSU	11.23	
5	Terra Evans	Texas Tech	11.27	
6	Sheniqua Ferguson Bahamas	Auburn	11.32	
7	Trisha-Ann Hawthorne	Connecticut	11.39	
8	Shayla Mahan	South Carolina	11.47	

==== 200 meters ====
- Final results shown, not prelims

Wind +1.2

Rank	Name	University	Time	Notes
1st place, gold medalist(s)	Porscha Lucas	Texas A&M	22.83	
2nd place, silver medalist(s)	Jeneba Tarmoh	Texas A&M	22.92	
3rd place, bronze medalist(s)	Nivea Smith Bahamas	Auburn	23.25	
4	Tiffany Townsend	Baylor	23.35	
5	Dominique Duncan	Texas A&M	23.48	
6	Sheniqua Ferguson Bahamas	Auburn	23.60	
7	Shavon Greaves	Penn State	23.75	
8	Samantha Henry	LSU	23.80	

==== 400 meters ====
- Final results shown, not prelims

Rank	Name	University	Time	Notes
1st place, gold medalist(s)	Francena McCorory	Hampton	50.69	
2nd place, silver medalist(s)	Jessica Beard	Texas A&M	51.02	
3rd place, bronze medalist(s)	Joanna Atkins	Auburn	52.01	
4	Keshia Baker	Oregon	52.34	
5	Shelise Williams	Arkansas	52.67	
6	Jody-Ann Muir	Mississippi St.	52.93	
7	Brandi Cross	South Carolina	53.01	
8	Regina George Nigeria	Arkansas	54.14	

==== 800 meters ====
- Final results shown, not prelims

Rank	Name	University	Time	Notes
1st place, gold medalist(s)	Phoebe Wright	Tennessee	2:01.40	
2nd place, silver medalist(s)	Molly Beckwith	Indiana	2:02.14	
3rd place, bronze medalist(s)	LaTavia Thomas	LSU	2:03.64	
4	Christina Rodgers	Arizona	2:04.47	
5	Christine Whalen	Georgetown	2:05.16	
6	Anne Kesselring	Oregon	2:05.41	
7	Kate Grace	Yale	2:05.92	
8	Kayann Thompson	LSU	2:07.15	

==== 1500 meters ====
- Final results shown, not prelims

Rank	Name	University	Time	Notes
1st place, gold medalist(s)	Charlotte Browning	Florida	4:15.84	
2nd place, silver medalist(s)	Gabriele Anderson	Minnesota	4:16.25	
3rd place, bronze medalist(s)	Jordan Hasay	Oregon	4:16.43	
4	Sheila Reid Canada	Villanova	4:16.66	
5	Pilar McShine Trinidad and Tobago	Florida State	4:16.72	
6	Karly Hamric	West Virginia	4:17.78	
7	Lauren Bonds	Kansas	4:18.06	
8	Lucy van Dalen New Zealand	Stony Brook	4:18.42	

==== 5000 meters ====
- Final results shown, not prelims

Rank	Name	University	Time	Notes
1st place, gold medalist(s)	Lisa Koll	Iowa State	15:23.80	
2nd place, silver medalist(s)	Marie Louise Asselin	West Virginia	15:53.93	
3rd place, bronze medalist(s)	Alex Kosinski	Oregon	16:02.90	
4	Risper Kimaiyo	UTEP	16:06.26	
5	Kathy Kroeger	Stanford	16:06.36	
6	Emily MacLeod	Michigan State	16:06.75	
7	Holly van Dalen	Stony Brook	16:06.77	
8	Alex Banfich	Princeton	16:06.79	

==== 10000 meters ====
- Final results shown, not prelims

Rank	Name	University	Time	Notes
1st place, gold medalist(s)	Lisa Koll	Iowa State	32:49.35	
2nd place, silver medalist(s)	Betsy Saina Kenya	Iowa State	33:13.13	
3rd place, bronze medalist(s)	Nicole Blood	Oregon	33:22.62	
4	Clara Grandt	West Virginia	33:23.22	
5	Pasca Cheruiyot	Florida State	33:23.63	
6	Tara Erdmann	Loyola Marymount	33:27.66	
7	Danielle Domenichelli	UC Santa Barbara	33:32.81	
8	Stephanie Marcy	Stanford	33:32.92	

==== 100 meters hurdles ====
- Final results shown, not prelims

Wind: +1.8

Rank	Name	University	Time	Notes
1st place, gold medalist(s)	Queen Quedith Harrison	Virginia Tech	12.67	
2nd place, silver medalist(s)	Ti'erra Brown	Miami	12.84	
3rd place, bronze medalist(s)	Aleesha Barber Trinidad and Tobago	Penn State	12.91	
4	Kristi Castlin	Virginia Tech	13.00	
5	Jackie Coward	Central Florida	13.04	
6	Vashti Thomas	Texas A&M	13.09	
7	Kimberley Laing	Alabama	13.20	
8	Vanneish Ivy	North Carolina	13.24	

==== 400 meters hurdles ====
- Final results shown, not prelims

Rank	Name	University	Time	Notes
1st place, gold medalist(s)	Queen Quedith Harrison	Virginia Tech	54.55	
2nd place, silver medalist(s)	Ti'erra Brown	Miami	55.22	
3rd place, bronze medalist(s)	Tameka Jameson	Miami	56.37	
4	Wendy Fawn Dorr	Penn State	56.75	
5	Jasmine Chaney	Arizona State	57.83	
6	Erica Moore	Indiana State	58.12	
7	Takecia Jameson	Miami	58.33	
8	Angele Cooper	Texas	59.05	

==== 3000 meter steeplechase ====
- Only top eight final results shown

Rank	Name	University	Time	Notes
1st place, gold medalist(s)	Bridget Franek	Penn State	09:38.86	
2nd place, silver medalist(s)	Emma Coburn	Colorado	09:51.86	
3rd place, bronze medalist(s)	Ashley Higginson	Princeton	09:52.73	
4	Sarah Pease	Indiana	09:56.91	
5	Shalaya Kipp	Colorado	09:59.37	
6	Shelby Greany	Providence	10:00.88	
7	Kristen Hemphill	Colorado St.	10:07.40	
8	Marie Lawrence	Washington	10:10.60	

==== 4 × 100 meters relay ====
- Final results shown, not prelims

Rank	University	Members	Time	Notes
1st place, gold medalist(s)	Texas A&M	Jeneba Tarmoh, Porscha Lucas, Dominique Duncan, Elizabeth Adeoti	42.82	
2nd place, silver medalist(s)	LSU	Samantha Henry, Kimberlyn Duncan, Takeia Pinckney, Kenyanna Wilson	43.72	
3rd place, bronze medalist(s)	Oregon	Mandy White, Amber Purvis, Keshia Baker, Jamesha Youngblood	43.74	
4	Clemson	Michaylin Golladay, Stormy Kendrick, Kristine Scott, Jasmine Edgerson	44.12	
5	Houston	Christie Jones, Whitney Harris, Kalyn Floyd, Grecia Bolton	44.24	
6	Baylor	Brittany Bruce, Tiffany Townsend, Diamond Richardson, Brittany Carr	44.28	
7	Auburn	Shaquela Williams, Joanna Atkins, Sheniqua Ferguson Bahamas, Nivea Smith Bahamas	44.43	
8	Texas Tech	Erica Alexander, Terra Evans, Candace Jackson, Taylor Evans	44.97	

==== 4 × 400 meters relay ====
- Final results shown, not prelims

Rank	University	Members	Time	Notes
1st place, gold medalist(s)	Oregon	Brianne Theisen, Amber Purvis, Michele Williams, Keshia Baker	3:28.41	
2nd place, silver medalist(s)	Texas A&M	Jeneba Tarmoh, Ashika Charan, Donique' Flemings, Jessica Beard	3:28.57	
3rd place, bronze medalist(s)	LSU	Latoya McDermott Jamaica, Cassandra Tate, Kayann Thompson Jamaica, LaTavia Thomas	3:30.61	
4	Penn State	Aleesha Barber Trinidad and Tobago, Shavon Greaves, Doris Anyanwu, Wendy Fawn Dorr Canada	3:30.74	
5	Arkansas	Whitney Jones, Shelise Williams, Karen Thomas, Regina George Nigeria	3:31.17	
6	Auburn	Cache Armbrister Bahamas, Joanna Atkins, Lakeshia Williams, Kai Selvon Trinidad and Tobago	3:33.17	
7	Texas	Alicia Peterson, Stacey-Ann Smith, Chantel Malone British Virgin Islands, Angele Cooper	3:34.21	
8	Texas Tech	Candace Jackson, Trudeann Clarke Jamaica, Erica Alexander, Taylor Evans	3:35.86	

==== High jump ====
- Only top eight final results shown

Rank	Name	University	Height	Notes
1st place, gold medalist(s)	Amber Kaufman	Hawaii	1.86 m (6 ft 1 in)	
2nd place, silver medalist(s)	Elizabeth Patterson	Arizona	1.83 m (6 ft 0 in)	
3rd place, bronze medalist(s)	Epley Bullock	Nebraska	1.80 m (5 ft 10 3/4 in)	
4	Jane Doolittle	UC Santa Barbara	1.80 m (5 ft 10 3/4 in)	
5	Chealsea Taylor	Alabama	1.76 m (5 ft 9 1/4 in)	
6	Priscilla Frederick Antigua and Barbuda	St. John's	1.76 m (5 ft 9 1/4 in)	
7	Tynita Butts	East Carolina	1.76 m (5 ft 9 1/4 in)	
8	Brigetta Barrett	Arizona	1.76 m (5 ft 9 1/4 in)	

==== Pole vault ====
- Only top eight final results shown

Rank	Name	University	Height	Notes
1st place, gold medalist(s)	Kylie Hutson	Indiana State	4.45 m (14 ft 7 in)	
2nd place, silver medalist(s)	Tina Sutej Slovenia	Arkansas	4.40 m (14 ft 5 in)	
3rd place, bronze medalist(s)	Tori Pena Ireland	UCLA	4.30 m (14 ft 1 1/4 in)	
4	Ekaterini Stefanidi Greece	Stanford	4.20 m (13 ft 9 1/4 in)	
5	Katy Viuf	UCLA	4.20 m (13 ft 9 1/4 in)	
6	Natalie Willer	Nebraska	4.20 m (13 ft 9 1/4 in)	
7	Carrie Kayes	Akron	4.20 m (13 ft 9 1/4 in)	
8	Jenny Soceka	Wisconsin	4.20 m (13 ft 9 1/4 in)	

==== Long jump ====
- Only top eight final results shown

Rank	Name	University	Distance	Wind	Notes
1st place, gold medalist(s)	Blessing Okagbare Nigeria	UTEP	6.79 m (22 ft 3 1/4 in)	+0.8	
2nd place, silver medalist(s)	Arantxa King Bermuda	Stanford	6.57 m (21 ft 6 1/2 in)	+2.4	6.43m (+0.5)
3rd place, bronze medalist(s)	Mindy McClurkin	BYU	6.53 m (21 ft 5 in)	+1.4	
4	Jamesha Youngblood	Oregon	6.48 m (21 ft 3 in)	+1.5	
5	Shara Proctor United Kingdom	Florida	6.34 m (20 ft 9 1/2 in)	+1.2	
6	Tori Bowie	Southern Miss.	6.26 m (20 ft 6 1/4 in)	+1.5	
7	Neidra Covington	TCU	6.25 m (20 ft 6 in)	+1.8	
8	Andrea Geubelle	Kansas	6.24 m (20 ft 5 1/2 in)	+1.8	

==== Triple jump ====
- Only top eight final results shown

Rank	Name	University	Distance	Wind	Notes
1st place, gold medalist(s)	Patrícia Mamona Portugal	Clemson	14.01 m (45 ft 11 1/2 in)	+1.3	
2nd place, silver medalist(s)	Sarah Nambawa Uganda	Mid. Tenn. State	13.66 m (44 ft 9 3/4 in)	+3.6	13.54m (+1.2)
3rd place, bronze medalist(s)	Shara Proctor United Kingdom	Florida	13.62 m (44 ft 8 in)	+1.9	13.57m (0.6)
4	Kimberly Williams Jamaica	Florida State	13.58 m (44 ft 6 1/2 in)	+1.0	FOUL
5	Melissa Ogbourne	LSU	13.36 m (43 ft 9 3/4 in)	+4.0	13.31m (+1.4)
6	Tiffany Peters	Texas A&M	13.27 m (43 ft 6 1/4 in)	+3.2	13.10m (+1.6) )
7	Neidra Covington	TCU	13.19 m (43 ft 3 1/4 in)	+0.9	
8	Ashika Charan	Texas A&M	13.08 m (42 ft 10 3/4 in)	+3.8	12.46m (+1.3)

==== Shot put ====
- Only top eight final results shown

Rank	Name	University	Distance	Notes
1st place, gold medalist(s)	Mariam Kevkhishvili Georgia	Florida	18.11 m (59 ft 4 3/4 in)	
2nd place, silver medalist(s)	Karen Shump	Oklahoma	17.14 m (56 ft 2 3/4 in)	
3rd place, bronze medalist(s)	Kristy Woods	Buffalo	16.77 m (55 ft 0 in)	
4	Julie Labonte Canada	Arizona	16.59 m (54 ft 5 in)	
5	Jeneva McCall	Southern Illinois	16.54 m (54 ft 3 in)	
6	Faith Sherrill	Indiana	16.49 m (54 ft 1 in)	
7	Ashley Muffet	Kentucky	16.32 m (53 ft 6 1/2 in)	
8	Brittany Cox	Mid. Tenn. State	16.27 m (53 ft 4 1/2 in)	

==== Discus ====
- Only top eight final results shown

Rank	Name	University	Distance	Notes
1st place, gold medalist(s)	Jeneva McCall	Southern Illinois	54.98 m (180 ft 4 1/2 in)	
2nd place, silver medalist(s)	Brittany Borman	Oklahoma	54.33 m (178 ft 2 3/4 in)	
3rd place, bronze medalist(s)	Rachel Talbert	Oral Roberts	54.09 m (177 ft 5 1/2 in)	
4	Skylar White	Baylor	54.08 m (177 ft 5 in)	
5	Beth Rohl	Michigan State	53.44 m (175 ft 3 3/4 in)	
6	Simoné du Toit South Africa	SMU	53.20 m (174 ft 6 1/4 in)	
7	Sara Neubauer	Air Force	52.65 m (172 ft 8 3/4 in)	
8	Ashley Muffet	Kentucky	52.39 m (171 ft 10 1/2 in)	

==== Javelin throw ====
- Only top eight final results shown

Rank	Name	University	Distance	Notes
1st place, gold medalist(s)	Evelien Dekkers Netherlands	Florida	58.99 m (193 ft 6 1/4 in)	
2nd place, silver medalist(s)	Brittany Borman	Oklahoma	53.00 m (173 ft 10 1/2 in)	
3rd place, bronze medalist(s)	Karlee McQuillen	Penn State	52.17 m (171 ft 1 3/4 in)	
4	Marissa Tschida	Washington St.	51.79 m (169 ft 10 3/4 in)	
5	Anna Wessman	UTEP	50.62 m (166 ft 3/4 in)	
6	Hillary Pustka	Texas A&M	49.91 m (163 ft 8 3/4 in)	
7	Amy Backel	Oklahoma	49.67 m (162 ft 11 1/2 in)	
8	Maggie Mullen	Ohio State	49.50 m (162 ft 4 3/4 in)	

==== Hammer throw ====
- Only top eight final results shown

Rank	Name	University	Distance	Notes
1st place, gold medalist(s)	Nikola Lomnicka Slovenia	Georgia	65.57 m (215 ft 1 1/4 in)	
2nd place, silver medalist(s)	Dorotea Habazin	Virginia Tech	64.05 m (210 ft 1 1/2 in)	
3rd place, bronze medalist(s)	Jere' Summers	Louisville	62.54 m (205 ft 2 in)	
4	Gwen Berry	Southern Illinois	61.31 m (201 ft 1 3/4 in)	
5	Jeneva McCall	Southern Illinois	60.80 m (199 ft 5 1/2 in)	
6	Valerie Wert	Akron	60.40 m (198 ft 1 3/4 in)	
7	Olga Ciura	Southern Illinois	59.88 m (196 ft 5 1/4 in)	
8	Sasha Leeth	Southern Illinois	59.14 m (194 ft 1/4 in)	

==== Heptathlon ====
- Only top eight final results shown

Rank	Name	University	Score	Notes
1st place, gold medalist(s)	Brianne Theisen Canada	Oregon	6094	
2nd place, silver medalist(s)	Kiani Profit	Maryland	5682	
3rd place, bronze medalist(s)	Chealsea Taylor	Alabama	5617	
4	Chantae McMillan	Nebraska	5583	
5	Dorcas Akinniyi	Wisconsin	5506	
6	Diana Dumitrescu	Kent State	5474	
7	Laquinta Aaron	Mississippi St.	5455	
8	Cassie Merkley	Idaho State	5430	
