= Texas A&M Aggies =

Intercollegiate sports teams of Texas A&M University

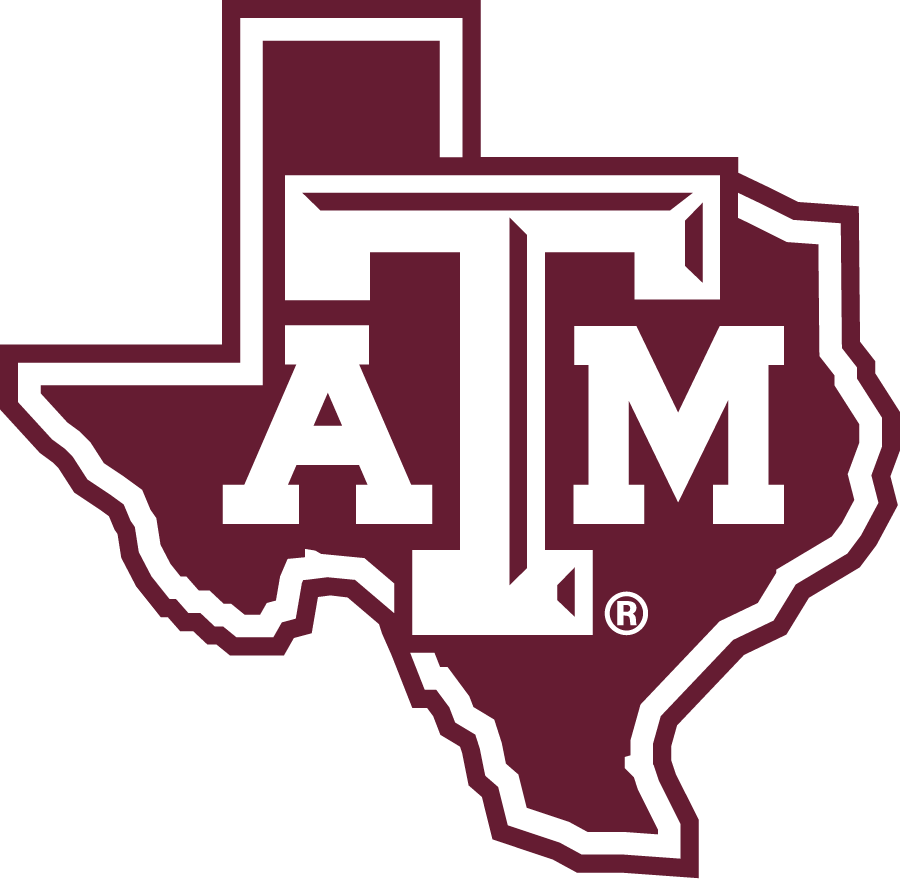
- University: Texas A&M University
- Nickname: Aggies
- NCAA: Division I (FBS)
- Conference: Southeastern Conference
- Athletic director: Trev Alberts
- Location: College Station, Texas, United States
- Varsity teams: 20
- Football stadium: Kyle Field
- Basketball arena: Reed Arena
- Baseball stadium: Olsen Field at Blue Bell Park
- Softball stadium: Davis Diamond
- Soccer stadium: Ellis Field
- Volleyball arena: Reed Arena
- Colors: Maroon and white
- Mascot: Reveille
- Fight song: Aggie War Hymn
- Website: 12thman.com

SEC logo in Texas A&M's colors

The Texas A&M Aggies are the students, graduates, and sports teams of Texas A&M University, a public university in College Station, Texas, United States. The teams compete in Division I of the NCAA.

The nickname "Aggie" was once common at land-grant or "ag" (agriculture) schools in many states. The teams are also simply referred to as "A&M" or "Texas Aggies", and the official school colors are maroon and white. The mascot is a Rough Collie named Reveille.

Until the dissolution of the Southwest Conference, Texas A&M was a charter member of that conference. The Aggies became members of the Big 12 Conference with its subsequent formation in 1996. On July 1, 2012, they left the Big 12 Conference and joined the Southeastern Conference (SEC).

== Sports sponsored ==
Men's sports	Women's sports
Baseball	Basketball
Basketball	Cross Country
Cross Country	Equestrian
Football	Golf
Golf	Soccer
Swimming & diving	Softball
Tennis	Swimming & diving
Track and field^{†}	Tennis
	Track and field^{†}
	Volleyball
† – Track and field includes both indoor and outdoor.

Texas A&M sponsors 20 varsity programs—nine men's and eleven women's.

=== Football ===
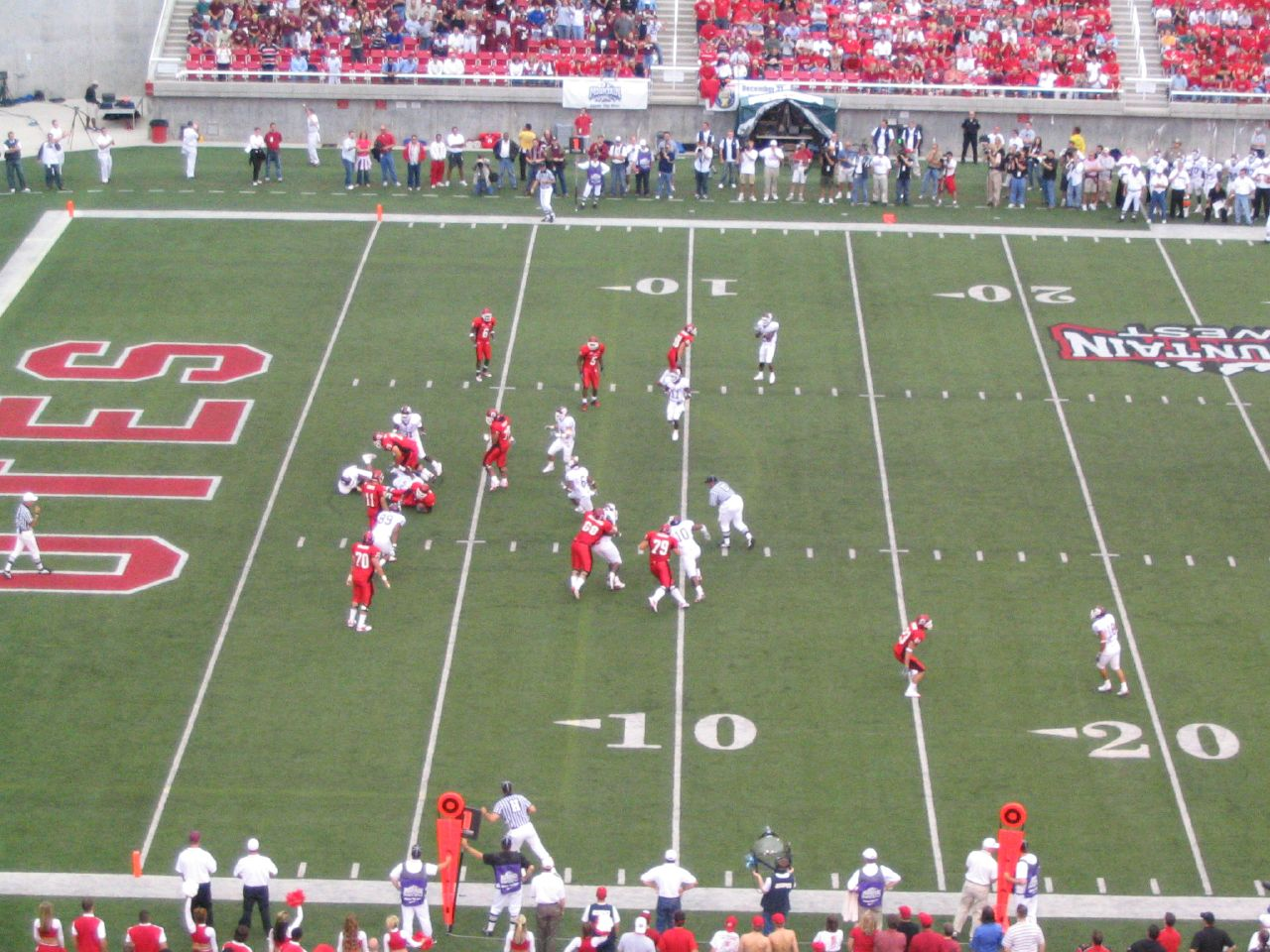
Texas A&M v Utah game in 2004

The Texas A&M Aggies claim three national titles and have won 21 conference titles. They have produced two Heisman Trophy winners—John David Crow in 1957 and Johnny Manziel in 2012, the first redshirt freshman to ever win the award. A&M has had two perfect seasons, having gone undefeated and unscored upon in both 1917 and 1919. They were named AP National Champions in 1939.

The football program experienced a period of little success lasting from 1944 to 1971, when the Aggies won only two conference titles. With Emory Bellard as head coach beginning in 1972, the Aggies returned to prominence with two 10 win seasons during his short tenure. He was replaced by Tom Wilson who had little success at Texas A&M before Jackie Sherrill took over the program. Sherrill won three consecutive conference titles and two Cotton Bowl Classic postseason games. His defensive coordinator, R. C. Slocum, replaced him as head coach in 1989. Slocum finished in the top 25 during 10 of his 14 years at Texas A&M and won 4 conference titles, including the school's only Big 12 title in 1998. Slocum also owns the Aggies' last undefeated season, in 1994, though they were ineligible for the conference title or postseason play due to NCAA sanctions.

In late 2002, Dennis Franchione left his position as head coach at the University of Alabama to take over Texas A&M's football program from Slocum. He finished the 2003 season at 4–8. Franchione finished the 2004 regular season with a 7–4 mark and an invitation to the Cotton Bowl Classic, a game the Aggies lost to Tennessee. The 2005 team regressed to 5–6 and defensive coordinator Carl Torbush was fired and replaced by Gary Darnell. Due to the much-needed improvements on defense, the Aggies finished the 2006 regular season with a 9–3 record and a 5–3 mark in Big 12 play, including a 12–7 victory over the Texas Longhorns in Austin, the first over the Longhorns in 6 years.

In the 2007 season, the Aggies finished in a three-way tie for third place with Texas Tech and Oklahoma State in the Big 12 South, leading only Baylor, which finished last. Although the team pulled out a 38–30 victory over the Longhorns on the day after Thanksgiving, Franchione was forced to resign due to fallout from a secret email newsletter that violated NCAA and conference rules. Former Green Bay Packers coach Mike Sherman was announced as his replacement three days later. Unfortunately, Sherman's first year at A&M resulted in one of the worst records in years, finishing at 4–8. The 2009 season showed some improvement with a 5–2 home record and a 6–7 overall record. More coaching changes were made after the 2009 season and the hiring of Tim DeRuyter lead the media coverage. In 2008, DeRuyter was the defensive coordinator and safeties coach at Airforce where his defense finished 11th in the NCAA in total defense, and 5th in pass defense.

The Aggie Football team was featured in the ESPN movie, The Junction Boys. The film dramatized Coach Paul "Bear" Bryant's grueling football practice sessions in 1954 in Junction, Texas.

=== Baseball ===
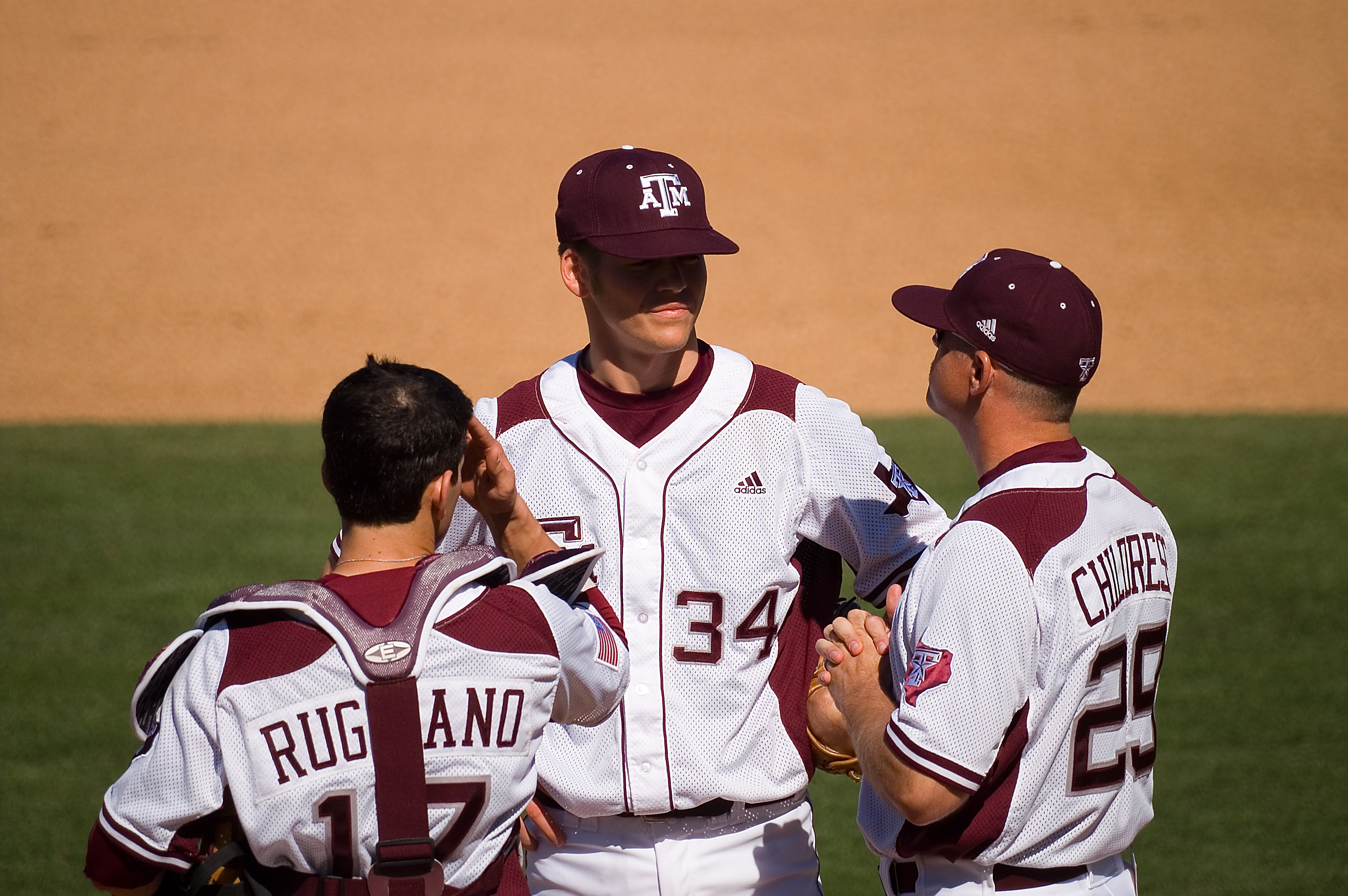
Former Head coach Rob Childress (right) with two players in 2008

The Aggie baseball team plays home games at Olsen Field, which went through major renovations and is now Olsen Field at Blue Bell Park. The team is coached by Michael Earley, who has led the program since his hiring prior to the 2025 season. Since conference play began in 1915, the Aggies have won 15 Southwest Conference titles, three Big 12 regular-season and two tournament titles, and have made eight College World Series appearances. 1989 was the high-water mark when the Aggies were ranking No. 1 for numerous weeks before ending the season ranked No. 2.

=== Basketball ===
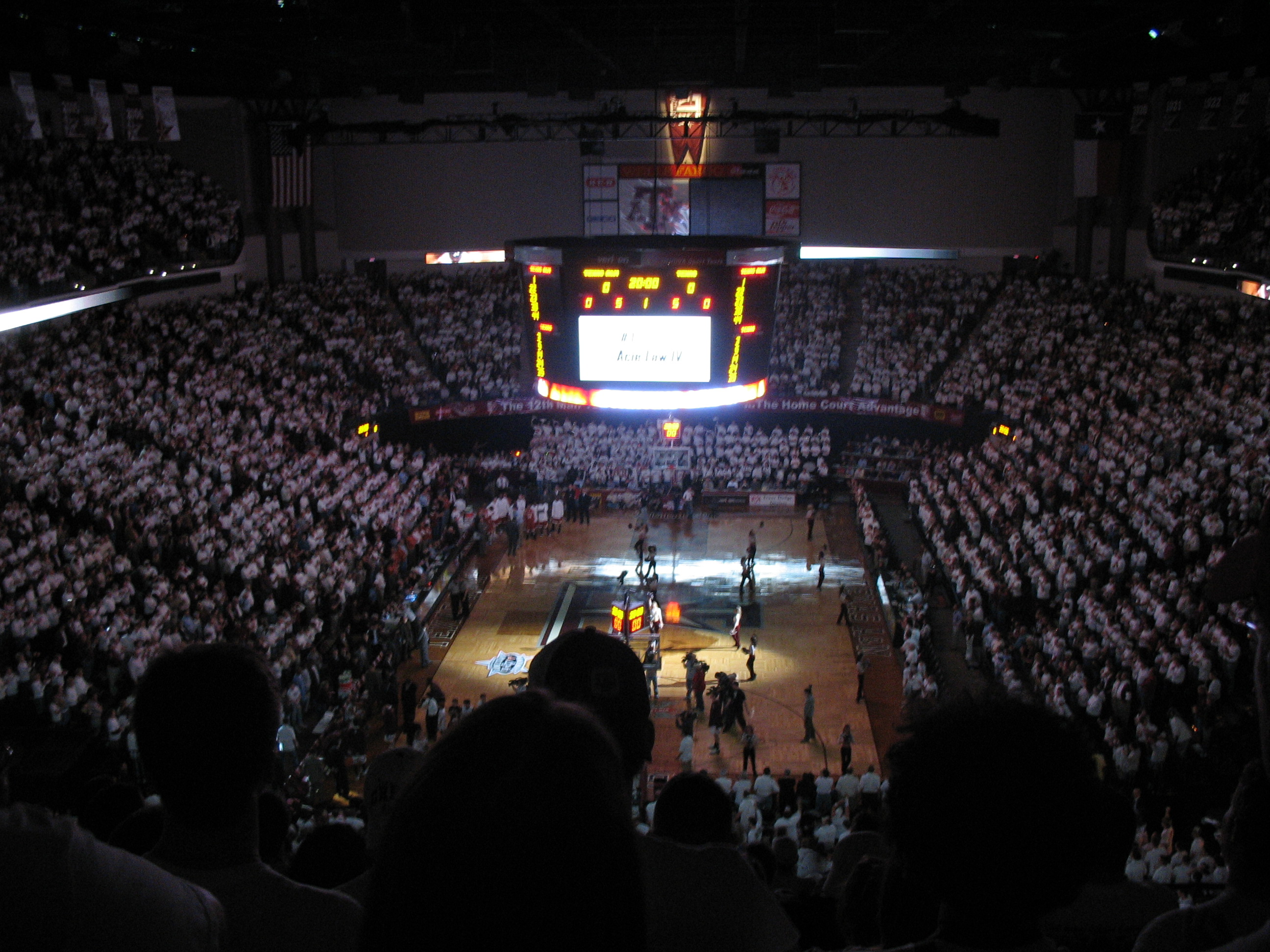
Player introductions during the 2007 Lone Star Showdown at Reed Arena

Texas A&M basketball had been dormant for much of its recent history until the mid-2000s. The Aggies have won 11 conference championships, two conference tournament titles, and have 10 NCAA tournament appearances. Under former head coach Billy Gillispie, the Aggies finished fourth in conference in 2006 only two years removed from having zero wins in conference play. Gillispie then led the Aggies to their first NCAA tournament berth since 1987, playing as a 12 seed, and to A&M's first NCAA tournament win since 1980 over fifth seed Syracuse. The Aggies were one point short of advancing to the Sweet Sixteen over fourth seed LSU, with a final score of 57–58. In the 2007 season, A&M spent most of the season ranked in the top 10 of the polls and became the first Big 12 south team to win against the University of Kansas in Lawrence since the Big 12 was formed. The Aggies finished with a 27–7 record and finished 2nd in the Big 12. They earned a number 3 seed in the NCAA tournament where they made it to the sweet 16, but fell to the University of Memphis 64–65. Acie Law IV was named an All-American. Billy Gillispie left for the University of Kentucky soon after the season. Mark Turgeon was named head coach a few days later, and has amassed a 73–31 record in his first three years in College Station, along with three more NCAA tournament appearances and a 3–3 NCAA tournament record.

The women's basketball team had two NCAA tournament appearances, an NWIT title, and a Southwest Conference tournament title before entering the Big 12. The program experienced little success in the new conference until former head coach Gary Blair took over the program. Blair's teams advanced to the NCAA tournament multiple times. He led the 2011 team to the NCAA national championship. He retired in 2022.

Ground broke on the Cox-McFerrin Center in November 2006, a 68,000-square-foot (6,300 m^{2}) expansion to Reed Arena which includes new locker rooms, meeting rooms, practice gyms, training rooms, player lounges, and reception areas.

=== Soccer ===
Women's soccer is coached by G Guerrieri, who has led the program since its inception in 1993. His Aggies have won 12 Big 12 titles (7 regular season and 5 tournament), including 4 straight regular season titles from 2004 to 2007. The Aggies made 17 consecutive appearances in the NCAA Tournament from 1995 to 2012. Of those 17, 4 are Elite 8 finishes, and 6 are Sweet 16 finishes. Since 1999, the Aggies have advanced at least as far as the Sweet 16 during all but four of their NCAA Tournament appearances. The Aggies have never been eliminated in the round of 64.

Texas A&M does not currently sponsor a varsity men's soccer program. The Aggies fielded a varsity men's soccer squad for just one season in 1981.

=== Softball ===
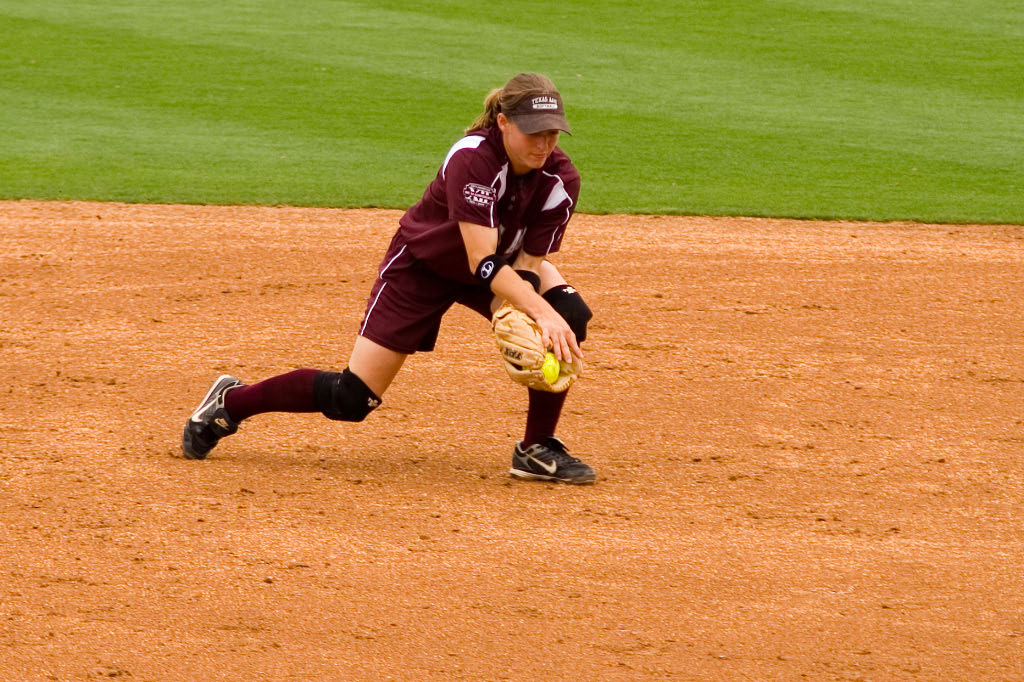
Aggie softball player during a game v Iowa State in 2007

The softball team formed in the 1972–73 season. The team won NCAA championships in both 1983 and 1987, and an AIAW championship in 1982. It also has eleven College World Series appearances.

In recent years, the Aggies have won two conference regular season championships (2005 and 2008), one conference tournament championship (2008), appeared in the NCAA Regionals nine times, winning two, and the Super Regionals thrice, winning two. They have also made three Women's College World Series appearances and finished 7th in 2007, 2nd in 2008, and 7th in 2017. At the end of 2018, the team played their first games in the new Davis Diamond, the top-of-the-line 2,000-seat stadium, which opened officially in the 2019 season.

=== Swimming and diving ===
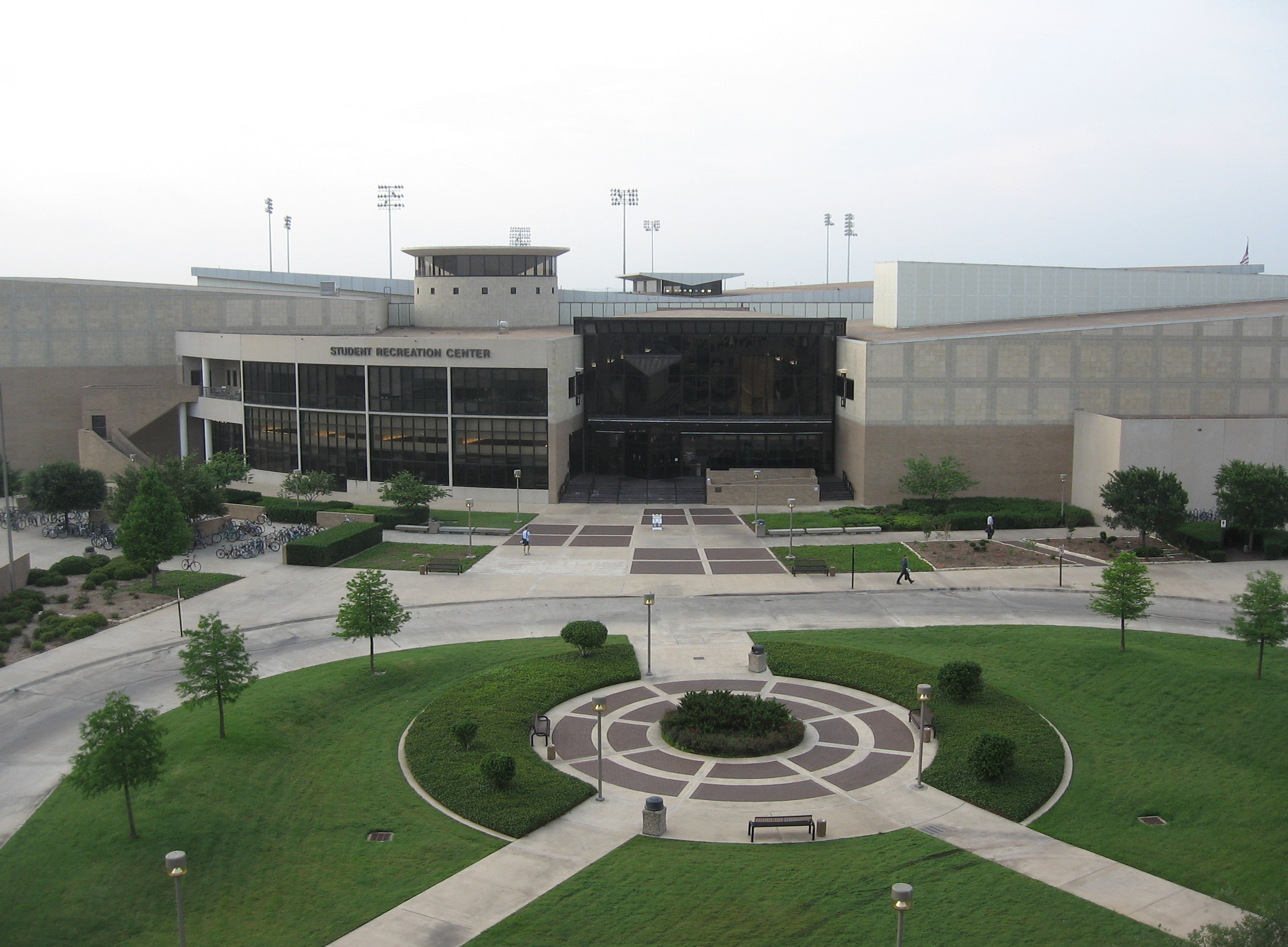
The Student Rec Center, home of the swimming and diving natatorium

Both the men's and women's swimming and diving teams compete in the Student Rec Center Natatorium. Long-time assistant Jay Holmes, who has worked at Texas A&M since 1987, became the head coach of the men's swimming program in 2004. Women's swimming is led by Steve Bultman, who has been the head coach since 1999. The diving program is led by Jay Lerew.

The Texas A&M women's swimming program has several notable current and former swimmers. This includes 2008 Summer Olympics medalist Christine Marshall, who swam for the US, 2012 Summer Olympics gold medalist Breeja Larson and Olympian Cammile Adams, both who also swam for the US, Triin Aljand, who swam for Estonia, Alia Atkinson, who swam for Jamaica, Julia Wilkinson, who swam for Canada, Else Praasterink who represented the Netherlands at the 2024 Olympics, and Aviv Barzelay, who swam for Israel in the 2020 Olympics and has qualified to swim for Israel again in the 2024 Olympics. Team members Kristen Heiss and Emily Neal were members of the US National Team and competed in the 2009 Summer World University Games.

The women's program has won Big 12 Swimming and Diving Championships, including in 2012. They finished tenth in the 2011 NCAA championships. The men finished 13th, cracking the top 25 for the 15th consecutive year.

=== Tennis ===
Men's tennis debuted in 1978. Richard Barker coached the inaugural season, compiling a 9–12 record. David Kent took over in 1979, and coached until 1996. Under Kent, the Aggies made two NCAA Tournament appearances in 1985 and 1994, finishing in the First Round in both. The Aggies also appeared in the NCAA Region IV Championships from 1994 to 1996, winning the 1994 championship. Tim Cass replaced Kent in 1997, coaching until 2006. In Cass's ten seasons at A&M, he won three Big 12 tournament titles and one conference title. He resigned in July 2006 to accept a position as senior associate athletic director at the University of New Mexico, his alma mater. In 2006, former ATP Tour player and Texas A&M–Corpus Christi head coach Steve Denton was named the new head men's tennis coach. Former Trinity University coach Bob McKinley became his assistant. Denton won three Southland Conference regular-season titles, two tournament titles, and had an overall conference record of 19–2, including two undefeated regular seasons, in his five years with the Islanders. In 2008, he was inducted into the Intercollegiate Tennis Association Hall of Fame, joining former A&M coach David Kent, who was inducted in 1998, and McKinley, who was inducted in 2003. With both of the coaching staff in the ITA Hall of Fame, the A&M men's tennis program is the only program in the country with two ITA Hall of Fame coaches. In 2011, the No. 3 seeded Texas A&M Men's Doubles team of Jeff Dadamo and Austin Krajicek defeated the No. 4 seeded Stanford University Men's Doubles team of Bradley Klahn and Ryan Thacher for the NCAA Men's Doubles Crown.

The women's tennis program started in 1980. The women's team is coached by Mark Weaver. Previously, Bobby Kleinecke led the Aggies. In 2003 and 2004, he was voted Big 12 Coach of the Year. Kleinecke led the Aggies to two conference titles in 1986 and 2003 and a tournament title in 2004. The Aggies have also made a total of 13 NCAA Tournament appearances under Kleinecke. In 2011, Howard Joffe, previously at Maryland, was named head coach after Kleinecke's contract was not renewed. Mark Weaver is the current head women's coach, leading the Aggies to the SEC championship and tournament championship in 2022 and 2023, and the regular season championship in 2024.

In 2024, Weaver and the Aggies won the NCAA national championship.

=== Track and field ===
Track and field is coached by Pat Henry. In his 17 years at LSU, Henry won 27 national titles, 17 SEC titles, 15 SEC Coach of the Year awards, and five National Coach of the Year awards. Henry was hired by Texas A&M before the 2005 season, taking over a program that had never won a title in women's track. Within three years, in 2007, his teams won both women's indoor and outdoor Big 12 Conference titles. In 2009, 2010, and 2011, he won both the men's and women's NCAA outdoor titles, a feat he has accomplished four times and duplicated by no other coach. Since arriving in College Station, Henry has won two National Coach of the Year and six Big 12 Coach of the Year awards.

Three A&M athletes have been recognized with The Bowerman, an award that honors collegiate track & field's most outstanding athlete of the year. They include: Jessica Beard (2011), Deon Lendore (2014), and Athing Mu (2021).

=== Golf ===
Men's golf is coached by Brian Korten who has been with the program since 2021. Recently the Aggies have been in 12 NCAA appearances and 5 top-10 finishes at the NCAA tournament. The 2009 team captured the NCAA title. They have won 11 conference championships:

- Southwest Conference (10): 1926, 1948, 1960–63, 1967, 1969, 1982, 1987
- Big 12 Conference (1): 2012

Women's golf has been coached by Gerrod Chadwell since the summer of 2021. The golf team won the Big 12 title in 1998, 2006, 2007, and 2010. In 2006, the team finished 19th at the NCAA Championship. In 2008, the team was fifth in their regional advancing to the NCCA Championship. In 2011, the team finished 7th at the NCAA Championship, which they hosted at the Traditions Championship Golf Course. In 2024, Adéla Cernousek won the individual NCAA Women's Championship.

In its third annual College Golf Guide, Golf Digest ranked both the men's and women's golf programs among the best in the nation in the team's scoring average, player growth, academics, climate, and facilities/coaches. The men's program ranked as the best in the Big 12 Conference and No. 15 nationally. The women's program ranked as the second best in the Big 12 Conference and No. 20 nationally.

=== Equestrian ===
Coached by Tana McKay, the women's equestrian team has been a varsity sport at Texas A&M since 1999. Although a group of administrators and coaches are working to make equestrian an NCAA-recognized sport, A&M competes with 18 other equestrian teams from Division I schools.

For seven years, from 2000 to 2006, the program participated in the Intercollegiate Horse Show Association National Championship, winning the Western division national title three times. The Aggies ended their participation in IHSA in 2006, and the program now competes only in the Varsity Equestrian National Championship, in which A&M won the overall national championship in 2002 and Western division titles in 2005, 2007, 2009, and 2010. Additionally, in 2010, Texas A&M won two individual national titles, with Caroline Gunn winning the national title for the second time in a row in Horsemanship, and Maggie Gratny winning the national title in reining.

Texas A&M won the inaugural Big 12 Classic in 2007, a competition between Big 12 programs with equestrian teams, which includes Baylor, Kansas State, and Oklahoma State.

=== Volleyball ===
The Aggie volleyball team is coached by Jamie Morrison, who has been at Texas A&M since 2023. The Texas A&M volleyball team participated in 13 consecutive NCAA postseasons, from Corbelli's first year in 1993 to 2005, reaching the Elite Eight twice and Sweet Sixteen three times. After several lean years, the Aggies returned to the NCAA tournament, advancing to the Sweet 16 in 2010 and the second round in 2011. In 2025, The Aggies captured their first NCAA National Championship after defeating Kentucky in straight sets.

== Notable non-varsity sports ==
=== Archery ===
Women's archery was a varsity sport at Texas A&M from 1999 to 2004. It was added in 1999 when the NCAA designated archery as an emerging varsity sport for women. Archery was cut from varsity status in 2004, however, due in part to the lack of growth of varsity NCAA programs at other universities. Archery now continues at Texas A&M as a club sport.

=== Rugby ===
Founded in 1968, Texas A&M Rugby plays in Division 1-A in the Allied Rugby Conference against traditional rivals such as Texas, Texas Tech, and Oklahoma. The Aggies are led by Head Coach James Lowrey. Texas A&M offers scholarships to in-state and out-of-state rugby players, and qualifying out-of-state rugby players may attend Texas A&M at the in-state tuition rate.

Texas A&M finished the 2011–12 season ranked 16th in the country. The Aggies won the 2012 Allied Rugby Conference 7s tournament, racking up wins against Oklahoma and Texas Tech along the way. The Aggies also won the 2012 Southeastern Collegiate Rugby Conference 7s, defeating Georgia in the final 28–10. This victory qualified the Aggies for the 2012 USA Rugby Sevens Collegiate National Championships, where they reached the quarterfinals. In the 2012–13 season, Texas A&M defeated Texas to win the Allied Rugby Conference.

== Championships ==
=== NCAA team championships ===
Texas A&M has won 17 NCAA team national championships.

- Men's (7)
  - Golf (1): 2009
  - Indoor Track and Field (1): 2017
  - Outdoor Track and Field (5): 2009, 2010, 2011, 2013, 2025
- Women's (10)
  - Basketball (1): 2011
  - Softball (2): 1983, 1987
  - Tennis (2): 2024, 2026
  - Outdoor Track & Field (4): 2009, 2010, 2011, 2014
  - Volleyball (1): 2025

=== Other National Team championships ===
Listed below are seven national team titles in current and emerging NCAA sports that were not awarded by the NCAA.

- Men's (3)
  - Football (3): 1919, 1927, 1939
- Women's (4)
  - Equestrian (3): 2002, 2012, 2017 (NCEA)
  - Softball (1): 1982 (AIAW)

Below are 204 national team titles won by Texas A&M varsity and club sports teams at the highest collegiate levels in non-NCAA sports:

- Men's (65)

- Archery (recurve) (19): 1995, 1996, 1997, 1998, 1999, 2000, 2001, 2002, 2003, 2004, 2005, 2011, 2013, 2014, 2018, 2021, 2022, 2023, 2024, 2025
- Archery (compound) (10): 1995, 1996, 1997, 2002, 2003, 2004, 2011, 2013, 2014, 2016
- Archery (barebow) (4): 2021, 2022, 2023, 2024
- Archery (bowhunter) (7): 2013, 2015, 2016, 2018, 2019, 2023, 2024
- Cricket (NCCA: First Leg) (2): 2024, 2026
- Fishing (CBFS) (2): 2007 (Cabela's), 2015 (Bassmaster)
- Handball (American) (5): 2002, 2003, 2019 (B Div), 2023 (Div. A), 2024 (Div. A)
- Judo (1): 2022
- Paintball (1): 2016
- Polo (12): 1996, 1997, 1998, 2000, 2001, 2007, 2008, 2010, 2016, 2018, 2019, 2025
- Powerlifting (2): 1983, 2015,
- Rugby (1): 1974
- Weightlifting (1^{§}): 1989

- Women's (61)

- Archery (recurve) (18): 1995, 1996, 1999, 2000, 2001, 2002, 2003, 2004, 2009, 2010, 2012, 2014, 2016, 2018, 2019, 2021, 2022, 2023
- Archery (compound) (14): 1996, 1997, 2000, 2001, 2002, 2003, 2004, 2005, 2007, 2012, 2013, 2014, 2016, 2026
- Archery (barebow) (1): 2023
- Archery (bowhunter) (5): 2016, 2017, 2018
- Equestrian (AQHA western) (4): 1994, 2002 (tie), 2003 (tie), 2004
- Equestrian (NCEA western) (6): 2005, 2007, 2009, 2010, 2011, 2012
- Handball (American) (7): 1988, 1989, 1990, 1991, 1992, 1994, 2013 (A Div.)
- Polo (6): 1994, 1995, 2018, 2019, 2023, 2025
- Powerlifting (2): 2010, 2019 (Equipped)
- Rodeo (2): 2002, 2026

- Combined (73)

- Adventure racing (1): 2013
- Archery (recurve) (22): 1995, 1996, 1997, 1999, 2000, 2001, 2002, 2003, 2004, 2005, 2006, 2008, 2009, 2010, 2011, 2013, 2017, 2021, 2023, 2024, 2025, 2026
- Archery (compound) (15): 1996, 1997, 1999, 2001, 2002, 2003, 2004, 2005, 2012, 2013, 2014, 2017, 2018, 2023, 2025
- Archery (barebow) (1): 2021
- Archery (bowhunter) (1): 2026
- Archery (overall team) (7): 2015, 2016, 2017, 2018, 2019, 2021, 2024, 2026
- Handball (American) (8): 1985, 1989, 1990, 1991, 1992, 2015 (Div. II), 2022 (A Div.), 2025(A Div.)
- Powerlifting (3^{§}): 1991, 1992, 1993
- Team Tennis (WTT format) (5): 2002, 2004, 2005, 2006, 2007
- Trap & Skeet Shooting (8^{§}): 1978, 1982, 2015 (Div. II), 2016 (Div. II), 2019, 2021, 2022, 2023
- Wakeboarding (1): 2015 (College Wake)
- Water skiing (2): 2005 (Div. II), 2022 (Div. II)

^{§} For this sport, some years may be missing from this list and hence remain uncounted.

=== Conference titles (181) ===
Texas A&M has won a total of 181 team conference and tournament championships. 96 titles were won during play in the Southwest Conference (93 men's/3 women's) while 58 were won in Big 12 Conference play (19 men's/39 women's). Texas A&M has won 36 titles in the Southeastern Conference (10 men's/26 women's) with the 2026 Women's Tennis Title being the latest.

- SWC = Southwest Conference
- B12 = Big 12 Conference
- SEC = Southeastern Conference

Football (18)
Regular season (18)
- SWC: 1917, 1919, 1921, 1925, 1927, 1939, 1940, 1941, 1956, 1967, 1975, 1985, 1986, 1987, 1991, 1992, 1993
- B12: 1998

Men's Basketball (14)
Regular season (11)
- SWC: 1920, 1921, 1922, 1923, 1951, 1964, 1969,1975, 1976, 1980, 1986
- SEC: 2016
Tournament (2)
- SWC: 1980, 1987
Baseball (25)
Regular season (19)
- SWC: 1931, 1934, 1937, 1942, 1943, 1951, 1955, 1959, 1964, 1966, 1977, 1978, 1986, 1989, 1993
- B12: 1998, 1999, 2008, 2011
Tournament (6):
- SWC: 1986, 1989
- B12: 2007, 2010, 2011
- SEC: 2016

Men's Tennis (11)
Regular season (5)
- SWC: 1994
- B12: 2000
- SEC: 2015, 2017, 2018
Tournament (6)
- B12: 1998, 2000, 2001, 2011
- SEC: 2014, 2015

Men's Golf (11)
Regular season (11)
- SWC: 1926, 1948, 1960, 1961, 1962, 1963, 1967, 1969, 1982, 1987
- B12: 2012

Men's Swimming and Diving (3)
- SWC: 1944, 1945, 1956

Men's Indoor Track and Field (4)
- SWC: 1980
- B12: 2011, 2012
- SEC: 2025
Men's Outdoor Track and Field (19)
- SWC: 1921, 1922, 1929, 1930, 1943, 1947, 1948, 1949, 1951, 1952, 1953, 1970, 1978, 1980, 1981
- B12: 2001, 2011, 2012
- SEC: 2014, 2017

Men's Cross Country (13)
- SWC: 1922, 1925, 1927, 1928, 1929, 1933, 1948, 1949, 1950, 1952, 1953, 1961, 1962

Men's Fencing (3) (discontinued in 1957)
- SWC: 1952, 1954, 1955

Women's Basketball (6)
Regular season (2)
- B12: 2007
- SEC: 2021
Tournament (4)
- B12: 1996, 2008, 2010
- SEC: 2013

Softball (3)
Regular Season (2)
- B12: 2011, 2008
Tournament (2)
- B12: 2008
- SEC: 2025

Women's Soccer (17)
Regular season (9)
- B12: 1997, 2002, 2004, 2005, 2006, 2007, 2010
- SEC: 2013, 2014, 2020, 2021
Tournament (8)
- B12: 1997, 2001, 2004, 2005, 2011
- SEC: 2013, 2014, 2017

Women's Tennis (10)
Regular season (8)
- SWC: 1986
- B12: 2003
- SEC: 2013, 2022, 2023, 2024, 2025, 2026
Tournament (2)
- B12: 2004
- SEC: 2022

Women's Golf (6)
- SWC: 1985
- B12: 1998, 2006, 2007, 2010
- SEC: 2015, 2023

Women's Swimming and Diving (8)
- B12: 2007, 2008, 2010, 2012
- SEC: 2016, 2017, 2018, 2019

Women's Indoor Track & Field (5)
- B12: 2007, 2008, 2009, 2010, 2012

Women's Outdoor Track & Field (6)
- B12: 2007, 2008, 2009, 2010, 2011
- SEC: 2013

Women's Volleyball (1)
- SEC: 2015

Equestrian (2)
- B12: 2011

- SEC: 2026

=== Conference division titles (7) ===
Football (3)
- B12: 1997, 1998, 2010
Soccer (1)
- SEC: 2012
Volleyball (1)
- SEC: 2012
Men's Tennis (1)
- SEC: 2013
Women's Tennis (1)
- SEC: 2013

== Director's Cup all-time final standings ==
The NACDA Director's Cup is an award given annually by the National Association of Collegiate Directors of Athletics to the colleges and universities with the most success in collegiate athletics. Points for the NACDA Director's Cup are based on order of finish in various NCAA sponsored championships or in the case of Division I Football media base polls. The award originated in 1993, and was presented to NCAA Division I schools only. In 1995, it was extended to Division II, Division III, and NAIA schools as well, each division receiving its own award.

Texas A&M's yearly final standings among other Division I schools since the cup originated in 1993 are as follows:

Year	Standing	Points
1993–94	24th	454.50
1994–95	37th	329.50
1995–96	20th	524.50
1996–97	30th	427.00
1997–98	38th	230.00
1998–99	39th	230.00
1999–00	27th	522.00
2000–01	26th	517.00
2001–02	37th	519.50
2002–03	28th	551.25
2003–04	16th	714.00
2004–05	26th	566.25
2005–06	23rd	649.50
2006–07	18th	881.00
2007–08	12th	1,031.00
2008–09	13th	976.00
2009–10	6th	1,070.75
2010–11	8th	1,090.50
2011–12	9th	990.25
2012–13	5th	1,131.50
2013–14	10th	1,022.00
2014–15	17th	892.75
2015–16	12th	962.00
2016–17	12th	986.50
2017–18	10th	1005.50
2018–19	15th	933.75
2019–20	Not awarded because of the COVID-19 pandemic	
2020–21	19th	846.25
2021–22	25th	794.75
2022–23	24th	808.75
2023–24	6th	1059.25
2024–25	15th	907.75
2025–26	12th	980.00

== Rivalries ==
Texas A&M has three active, long-time rivalries; the Texas Longhorns, the LSU Tigers and the Arkansas Razorbacks.

Texas A&M's traditional rival is the Texas Longhorns. The university has had other significant rivals, but few have come close to the rivalry shared between Texas A&M University and the University of Texas. The mutual respect and desire to win gave rise to the Lone Star Showdown, an athletic competition that lasted year-round and encompassed all regular-season NCAA athletic events between the two schools. Though the showdown officially began in 2004, the two teams had been competing with one another for more than a century. The rivalry went on hiatus in 2012 when the Aggies moved to the Southeastern Conference, but was renewed after Texas joined the conference in 2024.

After playing LSU sporadically throughout the 20th Century, the LSU–Texas A&M Rivalry is the Aggies' seventh oldest, with the series dating back to 1899. For many fans, LSU became the Aggies’ primary rival after Texas A&M joined the Southeastern Conference in 2012, mainly due to the extensive series history and geographic proximity between the two schools. The rivalry has intensified since 2018, after the Aggies defeated the Tigers in football by a score of 74–72 in 7OT.

Texas A&M and Arkansas share a rich history, dating back to when both were members of the Southwest Conference. The two schools first began playing each other in football in 1903. When Arkansas left the SWC in 1991 for the SEC, this rivalry was put on eighteen-year hiatus until the rivalry was reborn with the formation of the Southwest Classic in 2009.

Other historical rivalries that are partially or no longer active include those from the Aggies’ prior membership of the now-defunct Southwest Conference (Baylor, Texas Tech, Rice, Houston, SMU, and TCU). Texas A&M also competed against Texas, Baylor and Texas Tech while a member of the Big 12 Conference.

== Venues and facilities ==
Athletic venues and facilities include:
Football: Kyle Field

- The Zone Club
- Bright Football Complex
- Football Locker Room
- Football Players' Lounge
- Grass Practice Fields
- Indoor Practice Field

Basketball: Reed Arena

- Basketball Practice Facility

Baseball: Olsen Field

- Indoor Batting/Pitching Facility

Cross Country: Watts Cross Country Course

- Cross Country Running Course

Softball: Davis Diamond

- Softball Building

Volleyball: Reed Arena
Soccer: Ellis Field

- Soccer Building

Golf: Traditions Club Championship Golf Course

- Wahlberg Aggie Golf Learning Center

Tennis: George P. Mitchell Tennis Center
Track and Field:

- Indoor: Gilliam Indoor Track Stadium
- Outdoor: E.B. Cushing Stadium

Swimming and Diving: Student Rec Center Natatorium
Equestrian: Brazos County Expo Complex

- Equestrian Building

Athletic training, rehabilitation, and student-services facilities include:

- Netum Steed Laboratory
- Bright Building Athletic Training Room
- Nye Academic Center

Additionally, Texas A&M houses two dedications to student-athletes of the past:

- Texas A&M Sports Museum located at the north end of Kyle Field
- Erickson Hall of Fame and Hall of Honor

== Traditions ==
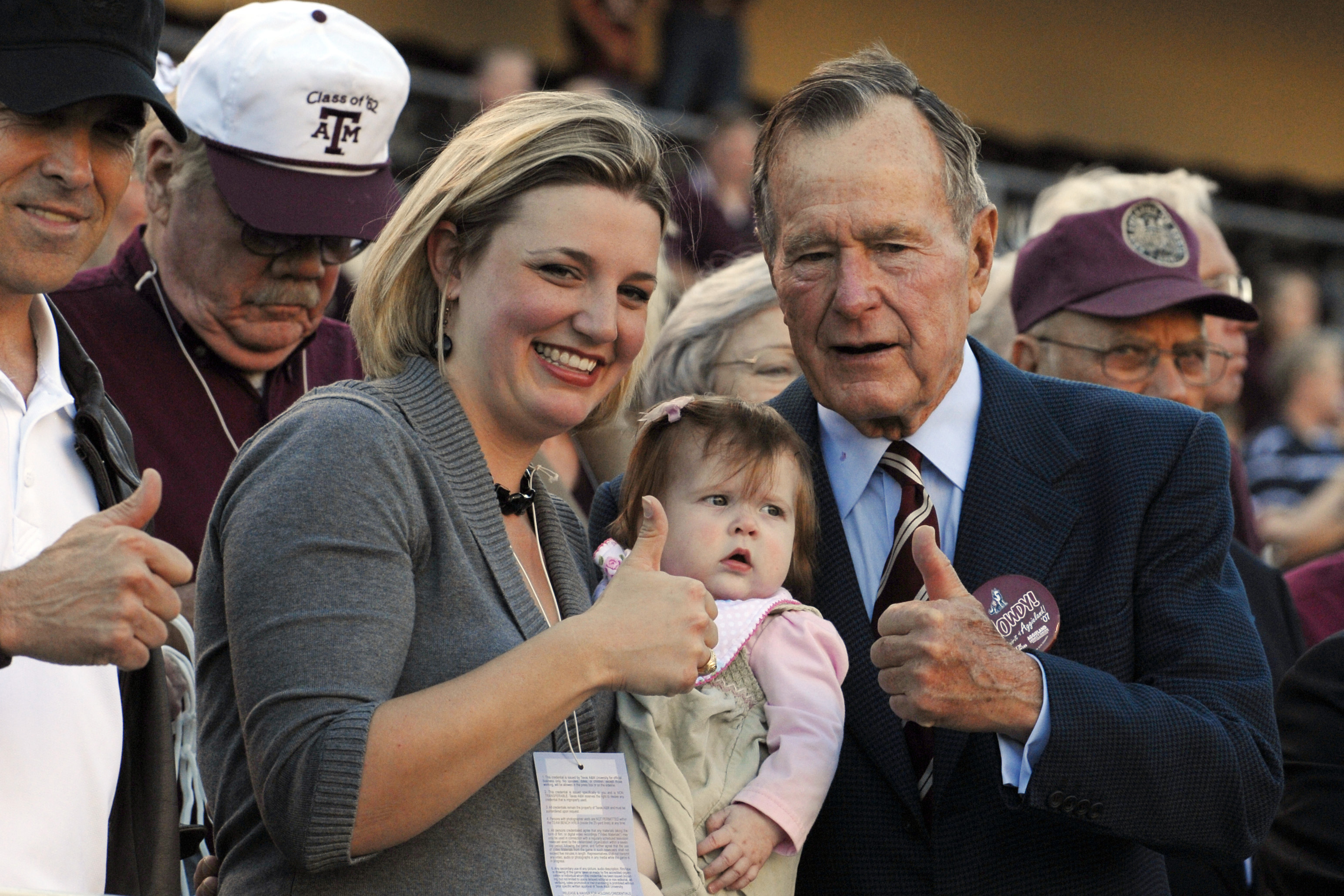
Former U.S. President George H. W. Bush (right) and Texas Governor Rick Perry (f. left) along with the wife of a veteran (center) give the sign

Texas A&M values traditions highly, many of which revolve around the sports in which the school competes. A few of the athletic traditions of Texas A&M include:

- The 12th Man – The entire student body is referred to as The 12th Man after E. King Gill stood ready to play on the sidelines in 1922.
- The Aggie War Hymn – The War Hymn is played at athletic events during the game and after a win.
- Aggie Bonfire – Built and burned before the annual football game with the University of Texas. Bonfire is now an off-campus event after the university cancelled it following the 1999 collapse.
- Fightin' Texas Aggie Band – The Aggie Band is the largest military-style marching band in the United States and performs at halftime during the football games.
- Midnight Yell Practice – Held the night before a home game, the student body gathers at Kyle Field to excite the crowd.
- Yell Leaders – Attending many events, wearing uniforms modeled after a milkman uniform the yell leaders use hand signals to keep the crowd yelling in unison.
- Gig 'em – The slogan used by Aggie supporters, often accompanied with a thumbs-up sign, the first hand sign of the Southwest Conference.
- Reveille – The official mascot of Texas A&M since 1931. Since Reveille III, all A&M mascots have been collies.
- Maroon Out – One designated home football game of the year is a "maroon out" game. All Aggies are instructed to wear maroon.

== Athletic directors ==
Name	Years served	Reference
Various committees	1895–1949	
Joe Utay	1912–1913	
Homer Norton	1934–1947	
J. W. Rollins	1947	
Bill Carmichael	1947–1949	
Barlow Irvin	1949–1954	
Bear Bryant	1954–1957	
Jim Myers	1957–1962	
Hank Foldberg	1962–1965	
Barlow Irvin	1965–1968	
Gene Stallings	1968–1972	
Emory Bellard	1972–1978	
Marvin Tate	1978–1981	
Wally Groff	1981–1982	
Jackie Sherrill	1982–1988	
John David Crow	1988–1993	
Wally Groff	1993–2002	
Bill Byrne	2003–2012	
John Thornton (interim)	2012	
Eric Hyman	2012–2016	
Scott Woodward	2016–2019	
R. C. Slocum (interim)	2019	
Ross Bjork	2019–2024	
R. C. Slocum (interim)	2024	
Trev Alberts	2024–present	

== Notable athletes and coaches ==
Former student-athletes and coaches at Texas A&M include:

- Sam Adams, NCAA All-American and NFL Pro Bowl defensive tackle
- Randy Barnes, Olympic gold & silver medalist, Former world record holder in the shot put Indoor-Outdoor
- "Bear" Bryant, head coach, 1954–1957, most successful coach in NCAA Division I college football
- Lee Roy Caffey, All Rookie, All-Pro, Pro Bowl, one World Championship, three Super Bowl wins, first Aggie to win Super Bowl
- Shaine Casas, three time NCAA champion, first male Aggie to win NCAA title in swimming, 2019 US National title in backstroke, 2020−2021 US National Team member.
- John David Crow, 1957 Heisman Trophy winner
- Dean Goldfine, former ATP Tour tennis player, former coach of Todd Martin and Andy Roddick
- Lester Hayes, five-time NFL Pro-Bowler, two Super Bowl wins with Oakland Raiders
- Dante Hall, two-time Pro-Bowler, tied for NFL record – most career kickoff return touchdowns
- John Kimbrough, Heisman Trophy runner-up, actor, former member of the Texas Legislature
- Chuck Knoblauch, 1991 MLB rookie of the year. four-time all-star, four-time MLB World Series champion
- Gary Kubiak, former NFL quarterback, former Houston Texans head coach, former offensive coordinator for the Baltimore Ravens, former Head Coach for the Denver Broncos and Super Bowl 50 Champion.
- Acie Law, Basketball All-American for the 2006–2007 season. 2007 Bob Cousy award winner
- Johnny Manziel, 2012 Heisman Trophy winner, CFL quarterback
- Randy Matson, Olympic gold medalist, former world record holder in the shot put
- Wally Moon, 1954 MLB rookie of the year, 1960 Gold Glove winner, two-time all-star, two-time MLB World Series champion
- Dat Nguyen, 1998 Lombardi and Bednarik Award winner, former Dallas Cowboy
- Kevin Smith Dallas Cowboys (1992-2000) 3x Super Bowl Champion All Pro 1996. 3x All Southwestern Conf Consensus AP All-American College Football Hall of Fame 2024
- Jackie Sherrill, head football coach, 1982–1988, three Southwest Conference titles
- R. C. Slocum, head football coach, 1989–2003, four conference titles, three-time Southwest Conference coach of the year
- Ty Warren, former defensive end and 2-time New England Patriots Super Bowl champion
- Yale Lary, Pro Football Hall of Fame inductee, DB and Punter from 1952 to 1964 with the Detroit Lions
- Richmond Webb, Miami Dolphins, 7 time Pro Bowl Selection, 5 time All-Pro Selection, Miami Dolphins Honor Roll
- Stacy Sykora, Olympic Volleyball, silver medalist, 3 Time Olympian
- Sam Bennett, Golfer, 2023 The Masters Low Amateur
- Hady Habib (tennis player), competes on the ATP Tour and represents Lebanon in Davis Cup. Became the first Lebanese player to win a round at a grand slam during the 2025 Australian Open
