= Ted Nelson (track and field) =

American track and field athlete and coach

Ted Nelson (born January 21, 1943) is an American former track and field athlete and coach. He served as the track and field coach at Texas A&M University.

Coaching career: 1966-graduate assistant coach; 1967-89 assistant coach; 1989-90 assistant head coach; 1990-2004 head coach. Nelson retired in 2004 and was replaced by Pat Henry

A 2-time Big 12 Coach of the Year, Nelson's 400-meter relay team finished second at the NCAA meet three times and won the national title in 1988 and won another title in 1997. A&M's 1600-meter relay won the outdoor championship in 1989 and an indoor crown in 1994. During his 14 years as head coach, Nelson led the Aggies to one Big 12 team championship and 17 Top 25 men's and women's team finishes at nationals.

While an athlete at Texas A&M Nelson once owned 13 school records. Including: 1964 Southwest Conference record holder in 440-yard dash, 1964 SWC champion in 440-yard dash and he was a 1965 Aggie football letterman.
