= Joe Zimmerman =

American stand-up comedian

Joe Zimmerman is an American stand-up comedian, currently residing in New York City. He has appeared on several television shows including Conan on TBS, The Late Late Show with Craig Ferguson, The Tonight Show, and Last Comic Standing Season 8. He has also made appearances on Nickelodeon, Comedy Central, and Sirius XM.

He is originally from Morgantown, West Virginia. He started doing comedy in North Carolina in 2006 and continued performing in neighboring areas until he moved to New York City in 2012.

He is a Scorpio.
