= Porscha Lucas =

American sprinter

Porscha Lucas (born June 18, 1988) is an American sprinter from Plano, Texas who specializes in the 100 metres and 200 metres. She was a two time NCAA 200m outdoor champion and All-American for Texas A&M University helping them with back-to-back wins in the NCAA Track & Field Championships 2009–2010 seasons.

== Personal bests ==
Event	Time	Venue	Date
100 m	11.12 (1.0 m/s)	Austin, Texas	April 4, 2009
200 m	22.29 (1.4 m/s)	Boulder, Colorado	May 18, 2008
