= Pat Henry (athletics coach) =

American track and field coach

Biographical details
- Born: July 22, 1951 (age 75); Albuquerque, New Mexico, U.S.

Coaching career (HC unless noted)

Track and field
- 1983–1987: Blinn
- 1988–2004: LSU
- 2005–2026: Texas A&M

Cross country
- 1988–2004: LSU

Accomplishments and honors

Championships
- NCAA Men's Indoor: (2001, 2004, 2017); NCAA Men's Outdoor: (1989, 1990, 2002, 2009, 2010, 2011, 2013, 2025); NCAA Women's Indoor: (1989, 1991, 1993, 1994, 1995, 1996, 1997, 2002, 2003, 2004); NCAA Women's Outdoor: (1988, 1989, 1990, 1991, 1992, 1993, 1994, 1995, 1996, 1997, 2000, 2003, 2004, 2009, 2010, 2011, 2014); Big 12 Men's Indoor: (2011, 2012); Big 12 Men's Outdoor: (2011); Big 12 Women's Indoor: (2007, 2008, 2009, 2010, 2012); Big 12 Women's Outdoor: (2007, 2008, 2009, 2010, 2011); SEC Men's Indoor: (1989, 1990, 2025); SEC Men's Outdoor: (1988, 1989, 1990, 2014, 2017); SEC Women's Indoor: (1988, 1989, 1991, 1993, 1995, 1996, 1998, 1999); SEC Women's Outdoor: (1988, 1989, 1990, 1991, 1993, 1996); National Junior College, Indoor & Outdoor: (1986, 1987)

Awards
- NCAA Men's Outdoor Coach of the Year: (2002, 2003, 2009); NCAA Women's Indoor Coach of the Year: (2003); NCAA Women's Outdoor Coach of the Year: (1993, 1995, 2009); Big 12 Women's Indoor Coach of the Year: (2007, 2008, 2009, 2010); Big 12 Women's Outdoor Coach of the Year: (2007, 2008, 2009); SEC Men's Indoor Coach of the Year: (1988, 1989, 1990, 2025); SEC Men's Outdoor Coach of the Year: (1988, 1989, 2002); SEC Women's Indoor Coach of the Year: (1989, 1994, 1996, 1998, 1999, 2003); SEC Women's Outdoor Coach of the Year: (1991, 1993, 1994); Louisiana Coach of the Year: (1994); Louisiana Men's Coach of the Year: (2000, 2001); Louisiana Women's Coach of the Year: (1996, 1997, 1998, 1999, 2000, 2001, 2003); National Junior College Coach of the Year, Indoor & Outdoor: (1986, 1987)

Pat Henry (born July 22, 1951) is an American retired track and field coach. He was most recently the head track and field coach at Texas A&M University, a position he held from 2005 to 2026. Henry also served as the head track and field coach at Louisiana State University (LSU) from 1988 to 2004, leading his teams to 27 national championships.

== Coaching career ==
Henry began his coaching career at Hobbs High School in Hobbs, New Mexico, where he led his teams to five state championships. In 1983, he moved to Blinn College in Brenham, Texas. Only three years after taking over the program, he won his first of two consecutive junior college national titles.

In 1987, Henry was hired by LSU for the track and field and cross country teams. In his first year at LSU, he won a national championship, three SEC titles and earned two conference Coach of the Year awards. Henry won 27 national titles, 19 SEC titles, 15 SEC Coach of the Year awards and five National Coach of the Year honors at LSU. He would win both the men's and women's national titles in both 1989 and 1990.

At LSU, he produced 37 Olympians and 38 World Championship competitors during the Henry era, totals that include three Olympic Gold Medalists and five medalists at the World Championships.

In 2004, he was hired by Texas A&M as head track and field coach. In Henry's tenure at Texas A&M, his teams have finished in the top ten at NCAA meets 14 times and won eight Big 12 titles, earning Henry the title of Big 12 Coach of the Year eight times. In 2009, 2010 and 2011 he won both the men's and women's outdoor national titles.

Henry is the only coach in NCAA history to win both men's and women's track and field national titles in the same year; he has accomplished the feat five times with two different programs (LSU in 1989 and 1990 and Texas A&M in 2009, 2010 and 2011).

In 2006, Henry served as head track & field coach for the U.S. Team at the IAAF World Cup. He was inducted into the Texas Sports Hall of Fame in 2017.

On June 17, 2026, Henry announced his retirement after 54 years of coaching.

== Yearly results ==
Program	Season	Men's Indoor		Men's Outdoor		Women's Indoor		Women's Outdoor	
Program	Season	Conf.	NCAA	Conf.	NCAA	Conf.	NCAA	Conf.	NCAA
LSU	1988	2 †	4	1 †	5	1	6	1	1
LSU	1989	1 †	6	1 †	1	1 †	1	1	1
LSU	1990	1 †	5	1	1	2	11	1	1
LSU	1991	2	39	2	6	1	1	1 †	1
LSU	1992	4	5	3	7	2	4	2	1
LSU	1993	3	12	2	2	1	1	1 †	1 †
LSU	1994	4	53	3	6	2 †	1	2 †	1
LSU	1995	4	14	3	3	1	1	2	1 †
LSU	1996	6	9	3	7	1 †	1	1	1
LSU	1997	5	10	3	27	2	1	2	1
LSU	1998	2	19	2	4	1 †	2	5	22
LSU	1999	6	7	5	9	1 †	2	3	5
LSU	2000	2	7	2	5	4	4	3	1
LSU	2001	2	1	6	5	4	14	4	6
LSU	2002	4	3	4 †	1 †	3	1	4	4
LSU	2003	7	3	6	4 †	4 †	1 †	3	1
LSU	2004	4	1	5	3	5	1	2	2
Texas A&M	2005	10	DNQ	6	29	10	DNQ	10	47
Texas A&M	2006	9	25	6	20	8	17	2	10
Texas A&M	2007	9	32	9	22	1 †	13	1 †	4
Texas A&M	2008	4	10	2	5	1 †	7	1 †	3
Texas A&M	2009	3	9	2	1 †	1 †	2	1 †	1 †
Texas A&M	2010	3	2	3	1 †	1 †	5	1 †	1 †
Texas A&M	2011	1 †	2	1	1	2	5	1	1
Texas A&M	2012	1 †	T-8	1	3	1 †	T-5	3	3
Texas A&M	2013	3	4	3	1	3	12	1	2
Texas A&M	2014	3	T-8	1	3	2	5	3	1
Texas A&M	2015	3	4	2	6	3	T-15	2	3
Texas A&M	2016	2	10	2	3	6	DNQ	2	5
Texas A&M	2017	3	1	1	2	7	12	6	13
Texas A&M	2018	4	5	2	7	5	10	3	19
Texas A&M	2019	5	11	4	6	2	10	2	4
Texas A&M	2020	Cancelled due to the COVID-19 pandemic							
Texas A&M	2021	8	31	6	6	9	2	4	2
Texas A&M	2022	9	5	6	25	7	10	5	4
Texas A&M	2023	10	32	5	22	10	14	3	5
Texas A&M	2024	3	6	3	5	4	14	4	10
Texas A&M	2025	1 †	10	4	1	5	7	2	3
Texas A&M	2026	3	6	4	11	7	19	T-6	18

† Henry earned Coach of the Year honors for results.

== Personal life ==
Pat married Gail Henry. They have two kids Brandon and Shelly. Shelly is married to Seth Daigle and they have two kids, Avery (2006) and Luke Daigle (2009). While their youngest Brandon married Brandie Henry and they have two kids. In 2005 they gave birth to Katie Ruth Henry, and in 2007 Morgan Shelly Henry.
