= Alabama Crimson Tide track and field =

American college track and field team

- University: University of Alabama
- Head coach: Dan Waters
- Conference: SEC
- Location: Tuscaloosa, Alabama
- Outdoor track: Sam Bailey Track and Field Stadium
- Nickname: Crimson Tide
- Colors: Crimson and white

The Alabama Crimson Tide track and field team is the track and field program that represents University of Alabama. The Crimson Tide compete in NCAA Division I as a member of the Southeastern Conference. The team is based in Tuscaloosa, Alabama, at the Sam Bailey Track and Field Stadium.

The program is coached by Dan Waters. The track and field program officially encompasses four teams because the NCAA considers men's and women's indoor track and field and outdoor track and field as separate sports.

The Crimson Tide won their only NCAA team title at the 1986 NCAA Division I Indoor Track and Field Championships in the women's division, scoring 41 points. However, in May 1986 Liz Lynch's mile championship title and 3000 m runner-up placing were vacated due to accepting prize money at road races against NCAA rules. The retroactive disqualifications subtracted 18 points from Alabama's score, leaving them in 5th place. Alabama track coach John Mitchell resigned in the wake of the findings.

== Postseason ==
=== AIAW ===
The Crimson Tide have had two AIAW All-Americans finishing in the top six at the AIAW indoor or outdoor championships.

AIAW All-Americans
Championships	Name	Event	Place
1981 Outdoor	Disa Gisladottir	High jump	5th
1981 Outdoor	Sue Gibson	Javelin throw	2nd

=== NCAA ===
As of August 2025, a total of 96 men and 59 women have achieved individual first-team All-American status for the team at the Division I men's outdoor, women's outdoor, men's indoor, or women's indoor national championships (using the modern criteria of top-8 placing regardless of athlete nationality).

First team NCAA All-Americans
Team	Championships	Name	Event	Place	Ref.
Men's	1952 Outdoor	Carl Shield	Shot put	8th	
Men's	1962 Outdoor	Charles Moseley	110 meters hurdles	7th	
Men's	1962 Outdoor	Charles Moseley	Long jump	7th	
Men's	1963 Outdoor	Charles Moseley	110 meters hurdles	4th	
Men's	1963 Outdoor	Charles Moseley	Long jump	4th	
Men's	1963 Outdoor	Charles Moseley	Triple jump	8th	
Men's	1972 Indoor	Thomas Whatley	55 meters	4th	
Men's	1972 Indoor	Jan Johnson	Pole vault	1st	
Men's	1972 Outdoor	Jan Johnson	Pole vault	2nd	
Men's	1973 Indoor	Pearlie Harris	4 × 400 meters relay	4th	
Men's	1973 Indoor	Bill Russell	4 × 400 meters relay	4th	
Men's	1973 Indoor	Mike Sullivan	4 × 400 meters relay	4th	
Men's	1973 Indoor	Randy Faust	4 × 400 meters relay	4th	
Men's	1973 Outdoor	Thomas Whatley	100 meters	5th	
Men's	1974 Indoor	Thomas Whatley	55 meters	3rd	
Men's	1974 Indoor	Tim Hamilton	Pole vault	2nd	
Men's	1975 Outdoor	Ed Williams	Javelin throw	2nd	
Men's	1976 Indoor	Steve Bolt	Mile run	3rd	
Men's	1976 Outdoor	John Crist	Decathlon	7th	
Men's	1977 Indoor	Steve Bolt	3000 meters	4th	
Men's	1977 Indoor	Gary England	Shot put	1st	
Men's	1977 Indoor	Stan Cain	Shot put	4th	
Men's	1977 Outdoor	Darroll Gatson	400 meters	7th	
Men's	1977 Outdoor	Mike England	Shot put	2nd	
Men's	1977 Outdoor	Buddy Blythe	Javelin throw	7th	
Men's	1978 Indoor	Joseph Coombs	600 yards	2nd	
Men's	1978 Indoor	Tony Husbands	4 × 400 meters relay	1st	
Men's	1978 Indoor	Ike Levine	4 × 400 meters relay	1st	
Men's	1978 Indoor	Darroll Gatson	4 × 400 meters relay	1st	
Men's	1978 Indoor	Joseph Coombs	4 × 400 meters relay	1st	
Men's	1978 Indoor	Jeff Woodard	High jump	4th	
Men's	1978 Outdoor	Joseph Coombs	400 meters	3rd	
Men's	1978 Outdoor	Darroll Gatson	400 meters	3rd	
Men's	1978 Outdoor	Jeff Woodard	High jump	3rd	
Men's	1978 Outdoor	Maxwell Peters	Triple jump	5th	
Men's	1978 Outdoor	Stan Cain	Discus throw	8th	
Men's	1979 Indoor	Joseph Coombs	600 yards	3rd	
Men's	1979 Outdoor	Joseph Coombs	400 meters	8th	
Men's	1979 Outdoor	Jeff Woodard	High jump	3rd	
Men's	1979 Outdoor	Maxwell Peters	Triple jump	5th	
Men's	1980 Indoor	Hreinn Halldorsson	Shot put	2nd	
Men's	1980 Outdoor	Calvin Smith	100 meters	4th	
Men's	1980 Outdoor	Jeff Woodard	High jump	1st	
Men's	1980 Outdoor	Rod Rudolph	High jump	7th	
Men's	1980 Outdoor	Hreinn Halldorsson	Shot put	3rd	
Men's	1980 Outdoor	Tim Martin	Discus throw	4th	
Men's	1981 Outdoor	Calvin Smith	100 meters	6th	
Men's	1982 Indoor	Calvin Smith	55 meters	3rd	
Men's	1982 Indoor	Emmit King	55 meters	4th	
Men's	1982 Outdoor	Calvin Smith	200 meters	2nd	
Men's	1982 Outdoor	Cedrick Vaughns	400 meters	3rd	
Men's	1982 Outdoor	Jeff Woodard	High jump	5th	
Men's	1982 Outdoor	Rod Rudolph	High jump	6th	
Women's	1982 Outdoor	Barbara Scott	400 meters hurdles	6th	
Women's	1982 Outdoor	Disa Gisladottir	High jump	1st	
Women's	1982 Outdoor	Pia Iacovo	Discus throw	5th	
Men's	1983 Indoor	Calvin Smith	55 meters	2nd	
Men's	1983 Indoor	William Wuyke	1000 meters	4th	
Women's	1983 Indoor	Disa Gisladottir	High jump	1st	
Men's	1983 Outdoor	Emmit King	100 meters	1st	
Men's	1983 Outdoor	Calvin Smith	100 meters	2nd	
Men's	1983 Outdoor	Calvin Smith	200 meters	2nd	
Men's	1983 Outdoor	Terry Menefee	400 meters hurdles	7th	
Men's	1983 Outdoor	William Wuyke	800 meters	2nd	
Men's	1983 Outdoor	Terry Menefee	4 × 400 meters relay	2nd	
Men's	1983 Outdoor	Calvin Smith	4 × 400 meters relay	2nd	
Men's	1983 Outdoor	Allen Buford	4 × 400 meters relay	2nd	
Men's	1983 Outdoor	Lamar Smith	4 × 400 meters relay	2nd	
Men's	1983 Outdoor	Vesteinn Hafsteinsson	Discus throw	5th	
Men's	1983 Outdoor	Thrainn Hafsteinsson	Decathlon	5th	
Women's	1983 Outdoor	Andralette Gill	4 × 100 meters relay	7th	
Women's	1983 Outdoor	Marcella Mariano	4 × 100 meters relay	7th	
Women's	1983 Outdoor	Faith Burleson	4 × 100 meters relay	7th	
Women's	1983 Outdoor	Gurtha Pounds	4 × 100 meters relay	7th	
Women's	1983 Outdoor	Disa Gisladottir	High jump	1st	
Women's	1983 Outdoor	Pia Iacovo	Discus throw	4th	
Women's	1983 Outdoor	Iris Gronfeldt	Javelin throw	7th	
Men's	1984 Indoor	William Wuyke	1000 meters	1st	
Women's	1984 Indoor	Lillie Leatherwood	400 meters	2nd	
Men's	1984 Outdoor	Cedrick Vaughans	400 meters	5th	
Men's	1984 Outdoor	William Wuyke	800 meters	4th	
Men's	1984 Outdoor	Terry Menefee	4 × 400 meters relay	3rd	
Men's	1984 Outdoor	William Wuyke	4 × 400 meters relay	3rd	
Men's	1984 Outdoor	Cedric Vaughans	4 × 400 meters relay	3rd	
Men's	1984 Outdoor	Lamar Smith	4 × 400 meters relay	3rd	
Men's	1984 Outdoor	Vesteinn Hafsteinsson	Discus throw	4th	
Women's	1984 Outdoor	Lillie Leatherwood	400 meters	3rd	
Women's	1984 Outdoor	Disa Gisladtottir	High jump	2nd	
Women's	1984 Outdoor	Pia Iacovo	Discus throw	2nd	
Women's	1984 Outdoor	Iris Gronfeldt	Javelin throw	1st	
Women's	1984 Outdoor	Yutta Shelton	Heptathlon	8th	
Women's	1985 Indoor	Lillie Leatherwood	400 meters	1st	
Women's	1985 Indoor	Yutta Shelton	High jump	5th	
Men's	1985 Outdoor	Terry Menefee	4 × 400 meters relay	2nd	
Men's	1985 Outdoor	Tony Davis	4 × 400 meters relay	2nd	
Men's	1985 Outdoor	Bernie Jackson	4 × 400 meters relay	2nd	
Men's	1985 Outdoor	Cedric Vaughans	4 × 400 meters relay	2nd	
Men's	1985 Outdoor	Thomas McCants	High jump	2nd	
Men's	1985 Outdoor	Eggart Bogason	Discus throw	5th	
Men's	1985 Outdoor	Siggi Einarsson	Javelin throw	4th	
Women's	1985 Outdoor	Evelyn Adiru	800 meters	3rd	
Women's	1985 Outdoor	Yutta Shelton	High jump	7th	
Women's	1985 Outdoor	Kelly Landry	Discus throw	5th	
Women's	1985 Outdoor	Iris Gronfeldt	Javelin throw	1st	
Women's	1985 Outdoor	Yutta Shelton	Heptathlon	8th	
Men's	1986 Indoor	Keith Talley	Long jump	4th	
Women's	1986 Indoor	Pauline Davis	55 meters	3rd	
Women's	1986 Indoor	Lillie Leatherwood	500 meters	2nd	
Women's	1986 Indoor	Evelyn Adiru	1000 meters	2nd	
Women's	1986 Indoor	Flora Hyacinth	Long jump	6th	
Men's	1986 Outdoor	Keith Talley	110 meters hurdles	1st	
Men's	1986 Outdoor	Peter McColgan	3000 meters steeplechase	3rd	
Men's	1986 Outdoor	Keith Talley	Long jump	3rd	
Men's	1986 Outdoor	Vesteinn Hafsteinsson	Discus throw	4th	
Men's	1986 Outdoor	Siggi Einarsson	Javelin throw	2nd	
Women's	1986 Outdoor	Pauline Davis	100 meters	3rd	
Women's	1986 Outdoor	Pauline Davis	200 meters	3rd	
Women's	1986 Outdoor	Lillie Leatherwood	400 meters	1st	
Women's	1986 Outdoor	Evelyn Adiru	800 meters	3rd	
Women's	1986 Outdoor	Evelyn Adiru	1500 meters	2nd	
Women's	1986 Outdoor	Heidi Olafsdottir	3000 meters	3rd	
Women's	1986 Outdoor	Flora Hyacinth	4 × 400 meters relay	2nd	
Women's	1986 Outdoor	Evelyn Adiru	4 × 400 meters relay	2nd	
Women's	1986 Outdoor	Pauline Davis	4 × 400 meters relay	2nd	
Women's	1986 Outdoor	Lillie Leatherwood	4 × 400 meters relay	2nd	
Women's	1986 Outdoor	Iris Gronfeldt	Javelin throw	5th	
Men's	1987 Indoor	Keith Talley	55 meters hurdles	1st	
Women's	1987 Indoor	Pauline Davis	55 meters	5th	
Women's	1987 Indoor	Flora Hyacinth	55 meters hurdles	7th	
Women's	1987 Indoor	Evelyn Adiru	1000 meters	3rd	
Women's	1987 Indoor	Heidi Olafsdottir	3000 meters	7th	
Women's	1987 Indoor	Evelyn Adiru	4 × 400 meters relay	6th	
Women's	1987 Indoor	Pauline Davis	4 × 400 meters relay	6th	
Women's	1987 Indoor	Sandra Latham	4 × 400 meters relay	6th	
Women's	1987 Indoor	Sherryl White	4 × 400 meters relay	6th	
Women's	1987 Indoor	Flora Hyacinth	Long jump	4th	
Women's	1987 Indoor	Flora Hyacinth	Triple jump	5th	
Men's	1987 Outdoor	Keith Talley	110 meters hurdles	5th	
Men's	1987 Outdoor	Dudson Higgins	Triple jump	8th	
Men's	1987 Outdoor	Eggart Bogason	Discus throw	6th	
Men's	1987 Outdoor	Siggi Matthiasson	Javelin throw	3rd	
Women's	1987 Outdoor	Pauline Davis	100 meters	5th	
Women's	1987 Outdoor	Lillie Leatherwood	200 meters	2nd	
Women's	1987 Outdoor	Pauline Davis	200 meters	4th	
Women's	1987 Outdoor	Lillie Leatherwood	400 meters	1st	
Women's	1987 Outdoor	Evelyn Adiru	800 meters	4th	
Women's	1987 Outdoor	Evelyn Adiru	1500 meters	6th	
Women's	1987 Outdoor	Heidi Olafsdottir	3000 meters	2nd	
Women's	1987 Outdoor	Flora Hyacinth	4 × 100 meters relay	3rd	
Women's	1987 Outdoor	Sandra Latham	4 × 100 meters relay	3rd	
Women's	1987 Outdoor	Lillie Leatherwood	4 × 100 meters relay	3rd	
Women's	1987 Outdoor	Pauline Davis	4 × 100 meters relay	3rd	
Women's	1987 Outdoor	Flora Hyacinth	Triple jump	5th	
Men's	1988 Indoor	Jack Williams	4 × 400 meters relay	5th	
Men's	1988 Indoor	Larry Cantrell	4 × 400 meters relay	5th	
Men's	1988 Indoor	Pierre Goode	4 × 400 meters relay	5th	
Men's	1988 Indoor	Alfonzo Henson	4 × 400 meters relay	5th	
Women's	1988 Indoor	Pauline Davis	55 meters	2nd	
Women's	1988 Indoor	Pauline Davis	200 meters	1st	
Women's	1988 Indoor	Evelyn Adiru	Mile run	5th	
Women's	1988 Indoor	Heidi Olafsdottir	3000 meters	2nd	
Women's	1988 Indoor	Elspeth Turner	3000 meters	6th	
Women's	1988 Indoor	Flora Hyacinth	Triple jump	4th	
Men's	1988 Outdoor	Jack Williams	4 × 400 meters relay	6th	
Men's	1988 Outdoor	Alonzo Henson	4 × 400 meters relay	6th	
Men's	1988 Outdoor	Pierre Goode	4 × 400 meters relay	6th	
Men's	1988 Outdoor	Larry Cantrell	4 × 400 meters relay	6th	
Women's	1988 Outdoor	Pauline Davis	100 meters	2nd	
Women's	1988 Outdoor	Pauline Davis	200 meters	2nd	
Women's	1988 Outdoor	Evelyn Adiru	1500 meters	2nd	
Women's	1988 Outdoor	Elspeth Turner	5000 meters	8th	
Women's	1988 Outdoor	Elspeth Turner	10,000 meters	5th	
Women's	1988 Outdoor	Flora Hyacinth	Triple jump	7th	
Men's	1989 Indoor	Larry Cantrell	400 meters	7th	
Men's	1989 Indoor	German Beltran	3000 meters	6th	
Men's	1989 Indoor	Dudson Higgins	Triple jump	6th	
Women's	1989 Indoor	Pauline Davis	55 meters	3rd	
Women's	1989 Indoor	Flora Hyacinth	55 meters hurdles	7th	
Women's	1989 Indoor	Pauline Davis	200 meters	2nd	
Women's	1989 Indoor	Flora Hyacinth	Long jump	8th	
Women's	1989 Indoor	Flora Hyacinth	Triple jump	1st	
Men's	1989 Outdoor	German Beltran	5000 meters	4th	
Men's	1989 Outdoor	Luis Bello	4 × 400 meters relay	4th	
Men's	1989 Outdoor	Greg Parker	4 × 400 meters relay	4th	
Men's	1989 Outdoor	Eduardo Nava	4 × 400 meters relay	4th	
Men's	1989 Outdoor	Larry Cantrell	4 × 400 meters relay	4th	
Men's	1989 Outdoor	Siggi Matthiasson	Javelin throw	2nd	
Women's	1989 Outdoor	Pauline Davis	200 meters	3rd	
Women's	1989 Outdoor	Pauline Davis	400 meters	1st	
Women's	1989 Outdoor	Felicia Roberts	4 × 400 meters relay	8th	
Women's	1989 Outdoor	Sherryl White	4 × 400 meters relay	8th	
Women's	1989 Outdoor	Carleen Smith	4 × 400 meters relay	8th	
Women's	1989 Outdoor	Pauline Davis	4 × 400 meters relay	8th	
Men's	1990 Indoor	Marcend Coney	4 × 400 meters relay	3rd	
Men's	1990 Indoor	Brad McCuaig	4 × 400 meters relay	3rd	
Men's	1990 Indoor	Eduardo Nava	4 × 400 meters relay	3rd	
Men's	1990 Indoor	Greg Parker	4 × 400 meters relay	3rd	
Women's	1990 Indoor	Diane Francis	400 meters	6th	
Women's	1990 Indoor	Diane Francis	4 × 400 meters relay	6th	
Women's	1990 Indoor	Carleen Smith	4 × 400 meters relay	6th	
Women's	1990 Indoor	Kareth Smith	4 × 400 meters relay	6th	
Women's	1990 Indoor	Benita Thomas	4 × 400 meters relay	6th	
Men's	1990 Outdoor	Clive Wright	200 meters	7th	
Men's	1990 Outdoor	German Beltran	5000 meters	6th	
Men's	1990 Outdoor	Richard Beattie	4 × 100 meters relay	1st	
Men's	1990 Outdoor	Eduardo Nava	4 × 100 meters relay	1st	
Men's	1990 Outdoor	Brad McCuaig	4 × 100 meters relay	1st	
Men's	1990 Outdoor	Clive Wright	4 × 100 meters relay	1st	
Men's	1990 Outdoor	Siggi Matthiasson	Javelin throw	3rd	
Women's	1990 Outdoor	Benita Thomas	200 meters	4th	
Women's	1990 Outdoor	Diane Francis	400 meters	2nd	
Women's	1990 Outdoor	Katie Anderson	4 × 100 meters relay	6th	
Women's	1990 Outdoor	Benita Thomas	4 × 100 meters relay	6th	
Women's	1990 Outdoor	Tonya Lawson	4 × 100 meters relay	6th	
Women's	1990 Outdoor	Diane Francis	4 × 100 meters relay	6th	
Women's	1990 Outdoor	Carleen Smith	4 × 400 meters relay	2nd	
Women's	1990 Outdoor	Benita Thomas	4 × 400 meters relay	2nd	
Women's	1990 Outdoor	Kareth Smith	4 × 400 meters relay	2nd	
Women's	1990 Outdoor	Diane Francis	4 × 400 meters relay	2nd	
Women's	1990 Outdoor	Flora Hyacinth	Triple jump	4th	
Women's	1991 Indoor	Tonya Lawson	55 meters hurdles	2nd	
Women's	1991 Indoor	Diane Francis	400 meters	5th	
Women's	1991 Indoor	Grace Buzu	4 × 400 meters relay	6th	
Women's	1991 Indoor	Diane Francis	4 × 400 meters relay	6th	
Women's	1991 Indoor	Carleen Smith	4 × 400 meters relay	6th	
Women's	1991 Indoor	Kareth Smith	4 × 400 meters relay	6th	
Women's	1991 Indoor	Malin Ohlund	4 × 800 meters relay	3rd	
Women's	1991 Indoor	Marie Ohlund	4 × 800 meters relay	3rd	
Women's	1991 Indoor	Kristen Seabury	4 × 800 meters relay	3rd	
Women's	1991 Indoor	Vicky Lynch	4 × 800 meters relay	3rd	
Men's	1991 Outdoor	Richard Beattie	4 × 100 meters relay	3rd	
Men's	1991 Outdoor	Eduardo Nava	4 × 100 meters relay	3rd	
Men's	1991 Outdoor	Clive Wright	4 × 100 meters relay	3rd	
Men's	1991 Outdoor	Samuel Boateng	4 × 100 meters relay	3rd	
Women's	1991 Outdoor	Tonya Lawson	100 meters hurdles	7th	
Women's	1991 Outdoor	Diane Francis	400 meters	4th	
Women's	1991 Outdoor	Vicky Lynch	800 meters	7th	
Women's	1991 Outdoor	Carleen Smith	4 × 400 meters relay	4th	
Women's	1991 Outdoor	Grace Buzu	4 × 400 meters relay	4th	
Women's	1991 Outdoor	Kareth Smith	4 × 400 meters relay	4th	
Women's	1991 Outdoor	Diane Francis	4 × 400 meters relay	4th	
Women's	1992 Indoor	Faith Idehen	55 meters	6th	
Women's	1992 Indoor	Vicky Lynch	800 meters	6th	
Women's	1992 Indoor	Malin Ohlund	4 × 800 meters relay	2nd	
Women's	1992 Indoor	Celeste Jenkins	4 × 800 meters relay	2nd	
Women's	1992 Indoor	Marie Ohlund	4 × 800 meters relay	2nd	
Women's	1992 Indoor	Vicky Lynch	4 × 800 meters relay	2nd	
Men's	1992 Outdoor	Brian Thomas	Long jump	7th	
Men's	1992 Outdoor	Andrew Owusu	Triple jump	8th	
Women's	1992 Outdoor	Faith Idehen	400 meters	7th	
Women's	1992 Outdoor	Vicky Lynch	800 meters	2nd	
Women's	1992 Outdoor	Vicky Lynch	1500 meters	3rd	
Women's	1992 Outdoor	Kristen Seabury	1500 meters	4th	
Women's	1992 Outdoor	Heather Warner	5000 meters	7th	
Women's	1992 Outdoor	Carleen Smith	4 × 400 meters relay	7th	
Women's	1992 Outdoor	Michelle Morgan	4 × 400 meters relay	7th	
Women's	1992 Outdoor	Grace Buzu	4 × 400 meters relay	7th	
Women's	1992 Outdoor	Charmaine Gilgeous	4 × 400 meters relay	7th	
Women's	1992 Outdoor	Hanna Gylfadottir	Shot put	7th	
Men's	1993 Indoor	Solomon Amegatcher	400 meters	4th	
Men's	1993 Indoor	Henry Hagan	4 × 400 meters relay	6th	
Men's	1993 Indoor	Omokaro Alohan	4 × 400 meters relay	6th	
Men's	1993 Indoor	Warren Simmons	4 × 400 meters relay	6th	
Men's	1993 Indoor	Solomon Amegatcher	4 × 400 meters relay	6th	
Women's	1993 Indoor	Faith Idehen	55 meters	6th	
Women's	1993 Indoor	Stacey Bowen	200 meters	4th	
Women's	1993 Indoor	Vicky Lynch	800 meters	2nd	
Women's	1993 Indoor	Stacey Bowen	4 × 400 meters relay	6th	
Women's	1993 Indoor	Fertacia Chapman	4 × 400 meters relay	6th	
Women's	1993 Indoor	Faith Idehen	4 × 400 meters relay	6th	
Women's	1993 Indoor	Michelle Morgan	4 × 400 meters relay	6th	
Women's	1993 Indoor	Malin Ohlund	4 × 800 meters relay	3rd	
Women's	1993 Indoor	Celeste Jenkins	4 × 800 meters relay	3rd	
Women's	1993 Indoor	Marie Ohlund	4 × 800 meters relay	3rd	
Women's	1993 Indoor	Vicky Lynch	4 × 800 meters relay	3rd	
Men's	1993 Outdoor	Samuel Boateng	200 meters	8th	
Men's	1993 Outdoor	David Nti-Berko	Triple jump	5th	
Men's	1993 Outdoor	Joakim Nilsson	Javelin throw	5th	
Women's	1993 Outdoor	Faith Idehen	100 meters	8th	
Women's	1993 Outdoor	Stacey Bowen	200 meters	5th	
Women's	1993 Outdoor	Vicky Lynch	800 meters	5th	
Women's	1993 Outdoor	Vicky Lynch	1500 meters	7th	
Women's	1993 Outdoor	Heather Warner	5000 meters	4th	
Women's	1993 Outdoor	Stacey Bowen	4 × 100 meters relay	2nd	
Women's	1993 Outdoor	Faith Idehen	4 × 100 meters relay	2nd	
Women's	1993 Outdoor	Fertacia Chapman	4 × 100 meters relay	2nd	
Women's	1993 Outdoor	Andria Lloyd	4 × 100 meters relay	2nd	
Women's	1993 Outdoor	Celeste Jenkins	4 × 400 meters relay	8th	
Women's	1993 Outdoor	Michelle Morgan	4 × 400 meters relay	8th	
Women's	1993 Outdoor	Fertacia Chapman	4 × 400 meters relay	8th	
Women's	1993 Outdoor	Vicky Lynch	4 × 400 meters relay	8th	
Men's	1994 Indoor	Solomon Amegatcher	400 meters	6th	
Men's	1994 Indoor	Brian Thomas	Long jump	7th	
Men's	1994 Indoor	David Nti-Berko	Triple jump	7th	
Women's	1994 Indoor	Faith Idehen	55 meters	5th	
Women's	1994 Indoor	Stacey Bowen	200 meters	3rd	
Women's	1994 Indoor	Andria Lloyd	200 meters	4th	
Women's	1994 Indoor	Vicky Lynch	800 meters	3rd	
Women's	1994 Indoor	Becki Wells	Mile run	7th	
Women's	1994 Indoor	Marie Ohlund	Distance medley relay	3rd	
Women's	1994 Indoor	Stacey Bowen	Distance medley relay	3rd	
Women's	1994 Indoor	Vicky Lynch	Distance medley relay	3rd	
Women's	1994 Indoor	Becki Wells	Distance medley relay	3rd	
Men's	1994 Outdoor	Andrew Owusu	Long jump	5th	
Men's	1994 Outdoor	Brian Thomas	Long jump	8th	
Men's	1994 Outdoor	David Nti-Berko	Triple jump	4th	
Men's	1994 Outdoor	Joakim Nilsson	Javelin throw	3rd	
Women's	1994 Outdoor	Faith Idehen	100 meters	7th	
Women's	1994 Outdoor	Andria Lloyd	200 meters	5th	
Women's	1994 Outdoor	Stacey Bowen	400 meters	4th	
Women's	1994 Outdoor	Vicky Lynch	800 meters	5th	
Women's	1994 Outdoor	Malin Ohlund	3000 meters	7th	
Women's	1994 Outdoor	Petrina Lacey	4 × 100 meters relay	8th	
Women's	1994 Outdoor	Faith Idehen	4 × 100 meters relay	8th	
Women's	1994 Outdoor	Stacey Bowen	4 × 100 meters relay	8th	
Women's	1994 Outdoor	Andria Lloyd	4 × 100 meters relay	8th	
Men's	1995 Indoor	Andrew Owusu	Long jump	3rd	
Men's	1995 Indoor	David Nti-Berko	Triple jump	4th	
Men's	1995 Indoor	Andrew Owusu	Triple jump	7th	
Women's	1995 Indoor	Becki Wells	Mile run	2nd	
Women's	1995 Indoor	Jessica Fry	5000 meters	4th	
Men's	1995 Outdoor	Andrew Owusu	Long jump	2nd	
Men's	1995 Outdoor	Andrew Owusu	Triple jump	6th	
Men's	1996 Indoor	Andrew Owusu	Long jump	1st	
Men's	1996 Indoor	Andrew Owusu	Triple jump	5th	
Men's	1996 Outdoor	Mats Nilsson	Javelin throw	2nd	
Women's	1996 Outdoor	Jessica Fry	5000 meters	4th	
Men's	1997 Indoor	Tim Broe	3000 meters	4th	
Men's	1997 Outdoor	Mata Nilsson	Javelin throw	1st	
Men's	1998 Outdoor	Tim Broe	3000 meters steeplechase	7th	
Men's	1998 Outdoor	Mats Nilsson	Javelin throw	3rd	
Men's	1999 Indoor	John Williamson	Distance medley relay	4th	
Men's	1999 Indoor	Cori Loving	Distance medley relay	4th	
Men's	1999 Indoor	Dereik Edwards	Distance medley relay	4th	
Men's	1999 Indoor	Tim Broe	Distance medley relay	4th	
Women's	1999 Indoor	Brandit Cooper	60 meters hurdles	7th	
Men's	1999 Outdoor	Jeremy Taylor	200 meters	5th	
Men's	1999 Outdoor	Tim Broe	5000 meters	3rd	
Men's	2000 Indoor	Ron Bramlett	60 meters hurdles	3rd	
Men's	2000 Indoor	Tim Broe	3000 meters	2nd	
Men's	2000 Indoor	Jeremy Taylor	4 × 400 meters relay	6th	
Men's	2000 Indoor	Javon Dixon	4 × 400 meters relay	6th	
Men's	2000 Indoor	Randy Farr	4 × 400 meters relay	6th	
Men's	2000 Indoor	Cori Loving	4 × 400 meters relay	6th	
Men's	2000 Indoor	John Williamson	Distance medley relay	2nd	
Men's	2000 Indoor	Cori Loving	Distance medley relay	2nd	
Men's	2000 Indoor	Dereik Edwards	Distance medley relay	2nd	
Men's	2000 Indoor	Tim Broe	Distance medley relay	2nd	
Men's	2000 Indoor	Jeremy Taylor	Long jump	6th	
Men's	2000 Indoor	Miguel Pate	Long jump	8th	
Men's	2000 Outdoor	Ron Bramlett	110 meters hurdles	4th	
Men's	2000 Outdoor	Kenneth Fambro	110 meters hurdles	7th	
Men's	2000 Outdoor	Tim Broe	3000 meters steeplechase	1st	
Men's	2000 Outdoor	Tim Broe	5000 meters	5th	
Men's	2000 Outdoor	Miguel Pate	Long jump	5th	
Women's	2000 Outdoor	Brandit Copper	100 meters hurdles	5th	
Women's	2000 Outdoor	Peta-Gaye Gayle	400 meters hurdles	3rd	
Women's	2000 Outdoor	Safiya Ingram	Discus throw	3rd	
Men's	2001 Indoor	Ron Bramlett	60 meters hurdles	2nd	
Men's	2001 Indoor	David Kimani	3000 meters	1st	
Men's	2001 Indoor	David Kimani	5000 meters	1st	
Men's	2001 Indoor	Miguel Pate	Long jump	6th	
Women's	2001 Indoor	Peta-Gaye Gayle	400 meters	5th	
Men's	2001 Outdoor	Ron Bramlett	110 meters hurdles	1st	
Men's	2001 Outdoor	David Kimani	1500 meters	3rd	
Men's	2001 Outdoor	David Kimani	5000 meters	3rd	
Men's	2001 Outdoor	Christopher Mutai	10,000 meters	4th	
Men's	2001 Outdoor	Miguel Pate	Long jump	5th	
Women's	2001 Outdoor	Nicole Ireland	4 × 100 meters relay	7th	
Women's	2001 Outdoor	Peta-Gay Barrett	4 × 100 meters relay	7th	
Women's	2001 Outdoor	Judyth Kitson	4 × 100 meters relay	7th	
Women's	2001 Outdoor	Delilah Dillard	4 × 100 meters relay	7th	
Men's	2002 Indoor	Ron Bramlett	60 meters hurdles	1st	
Men's	2002 Indoor	David Kimani	Mile run	2nd	
Men's	2002 Indoor	David Kimani	3000 meters	4th	
Men's	2002 Indoor	Troy Henderson	Distance medley relay	3rd	
Men's	2002 Indoor	O'Neil Wright	Distance medley relay	3rd	
Men's	2002 Indoor	Curtis McBride	Distance medley relay	3rd	
Men's	2002 Indoor	David Kimani	Distance medley relay	3rd	
Men's	2002 Indoor	Miguel Pate	Long jump	1st	
Men's	2002 Indoor	Miguel Pate	Triple jump	2nd	
Men's	2002 Outdoor	Ron Bramlett	110 meters hurdles	1st	
Men's	2002 Outdoor	David Kimani	5000 meters	1st	
Men's	2002 Outdoor	Ron Bramlett	4 × 100 meters relay	8th	
Men's	2002 Outdoor	Jevon Mason	4 × 100 meters relay	8th	
Men's	2002 Outdoor	Roland Burks	4 × 100 meters relay	8th	
Men's	2002 Outdoor	Latonel Williams	4 × 100 meters relay	8th	
Men's	2003 Indoor	Latonel Williams	200 meters	3rd	
Men's	2003 Outdoor	Latonel Wiliams	200 meters	6th	
Women's	2003 Outdoor	Judyth Kitson	100 meters	7th	
Women's	2003 Outdoor	Beth Mallory	Discus throw	6th	
Men's	2004 Indoor	Peter Etoot	800 meters	5th	
Women's	2004 Outdoor	Beth Mallory	Discus throw	2nd	
Women's	2004 Outdoor	Beth Mallory	Hammer throw	7th	
Women's	2005 Indoor	Beau Walker	60 meters hurdles	4th	
Men's	2005 Outdoor	Peter Etoot	800 meters	8th	
Women's	2005 Outdoor	Tahesia Harrigan	100 meters	6th	
Women's	2005 Outdoor	Beth Mallory	Discus throw	1st	
Women's	2005 Outdoor	Beth Mallory	Hammer throw	4th	
Men's	2006 Indoor	LaChristopher Lewis	4 × 400 meters relay	5th	
Men's	2006 Indoor	Lemual Clayborn	4 × 400 meters relay	5th	
Men's	2006 Indoor	Peter Etoot	4 × 400 meters relay	5th	
Men's	2006 Indoor	Michael Cooley	4 × 400 meters relay	5th	
Women's	2006 Indoor	Beau Walker	60 meters hurdles	4th	
Men's	2006 Outdoor	Augustus Maiyo	3000 meters steeplechase	6th	
Women's	2006 Outdoor	Tahesia Harrigan	100 meters	4th	
Women's	2006 Outdoor	Miruna Mataoanu	High jump	6th	
Women's	2006 Outdoor	Beth Mallory	Discus throw	2nd	
Women's	2007 Outdoor	Trish Bartholomew	400 meters	7th	
Women's	2007 Outdoor	Miruna Mataoanu	High jump	2nd	
Women's	2008 Indoor	Trish Bartholomew	400 meters	2nd	
Men's	2008 Outdoor	Tyson David	10,000 meters	3rd	
Women's	2008 Outdoor	Trish Bartholomew	400 meters	2nd	
Men's	2009 Indoor	Tyson David	5000 meters	5th	
Men's	2009 Outdoor	Tyson David	5000 meters	7th	
Men's	2010 Indoor	Kirani James	400 meters	2nd	
Women's	2010 Indoor	Krystle Schade	High jump	8th	
Men's	2010 Outdoor	Kirani James	400 meters	1st	
Men's	2010 Outdoor	Fred Samoei	800 meters	8th	
Women's	2010 Outdoor	Kimberly Laing	100 meters hurdles	7th	
Women's	2010 Outdoor	Chealsea Taylor	High jump	5th	
Women's	2010 Outdoor	Krystle Schade	High jump	7th	
Women's	2010 Outdoor	Chealsea Taylor	Heptathlon	3rd	
Men's	2011 Indoor	Fred Samoei	800 meters	1st	
Women's	2011 Indoor	Krystle Schade	High jump	7th	
Men's	2011 Outdoor	Kirani James	400 meters	1st	
Women's	2012 Indoor	Krystle Schade	High jump	2nd	
Men's	2012 Outdoor	Kamal Fuller	Long jump	8th	
Women's	2012 Outdoor	Krystle Schade	High jump	4th	
Women's	2012 Outdoor	Alexis Paine	Pole vault	8th	
Men's	2013 Indoor	Diondre Batson	200 meters	8th	
Men's	2013 Indoor	Kamal Fuller	Long jump	8th	
Men's	2013 Indoor	Jonathan Reid	Triple jump	5th	
Women's	2013 Indoor	Krystle Schade	High jump	8th	
Women's	2013 Indoor	Alexis Paine	Pole vault	7th	
Men's	2013 Outdoor	Diondre Batson	100 meters	4th	
Men's	2013 Outdoor	Alex Sanders	4 × 100 meters relay	2nd	
Men's	2013 Outdoor	Diondre Batson	4 × 100 meters relay	2nd	
Men's	2013 Outdoor	Akeem Haynes	4 × 100 meters relay	2nd	
Men's	2013 Outdoor	Dushane Farrier	4 × 100 meters relay	2nd	
Men's	2013 Outdoor	Kamal Fuller	Long jump	6th	
Men's	2013 Outdoor	Imani Brown	Triple jump	6th	
Men's	2013 Outdoor	Elias Hakansson	Hammer throw	8th	
Women's	2013 Outdoor	Alexis Paine	Pole vault	4th	
Men's	2014 Indoor	Diondre Batson	60 meters	3rd	
Men's	2014 Indoor	Diondre Batson	200 meters	1st	
Men's	2014 Indoor	Jeremiah Green	Triple jump	7th	
Men's	2014 Indoor	Elias Hakansson	Weight throw	7th	
Women's	2014 Indoor	Remona Burchell	60 meters	1st	
Men's	2014 Outdoor	Justin Fondren	High jump	5th	
Men's	2014 Outdoor	Hayden Reed	Discus throw	1st	
Women's	2014 Outdoor	Remona Burchell	100 meters	1st	
Women's	2014 Outdoor	Quanesha Burks	4 × 100 meters relay	6th	
Women's	2014 Outdoor	Remona Burchell	4 × 100 meters relay	6th	
Women's	2014 Outdoor	Dominique Kimpel	4 × 100 meters relay	6th	
Women's	2014 Outdoor	Sarah Thomas	4 × 100 meters relay	6th	
Men's	2015 Indoor	Alex Amankwah	800 meters	6th	
Men's	2015 Indoor	Cameron Hudson	Long jump	7th	
Women's	2015 Indoor	Remona Burchell	60 meters	1st	
Women's	2015 Indoor	Lakan Taylor	Pole vault	6th	
Men's	2015 Outdoor	Steven Gayle	400 meters	5th	
Men's	2015 Outdoor	Tony Brown	4 × 100 meters relay	8th	
Men's	2015 Outdoor	Steven Gayle	4 × 100 meters relay	8th	
Men's	2015 Outdoor	Ahmed Ali	4 × 100 meters relay	8th	
Men's	2015 Outdoor	Tadashi Pinder	4 × 100 meters relay	8th	
Men's	2015 Outdoor	Jeremiah Green	Triple jump	6th	
Women's	2015 Outdoor	Quanesha Burks	Long jump	1st	
Men's	2016 Indoor	Jeremiah Green	Triple jump	8th	
Women's	2016 Indoor	Quanesha Burks	Long jump	1st	
Men's	2016 Outdoor	Tony Brown	110 meters hurdles	6th	
Women's	2016 Outdoor	Quanesha Burks	Long jump	2nd	
Men's	2017 Indoor	Ruebin Walters	60 meters hurdles	5th	
Men's	2017 Indoor	Jereem Richards	200 meters	2nd	
Men's	2017 Indoor	Steven Gayle	400 meters	4th	
Men's	2017 Indoor	Alfred Chelanga	5000 meters	5th	
Men's	2017 Indoor	Skyler Bowden	4 × 400 meters relay	8th	
Men's	2017 Indoor	Steven Gayle	4 × 400 meters relay	8th	
Men's	2017 Indoor	Jacopo Lahbi	4 × 400 meters relay	8th	
Men's	2017 Indoor	Jereem Richards	4 × 400 meters relay	8th	
Women's	2017 Indoor	Quanesha Burks	60 meters	7th	
Women's	2017 Indoor	Alex Gholston	400 meters	5th	
Women's	2017 Indoor	Takyera Roberson	4 × 400 meters relay	4th	
Women's	2017 Indoor	Alex Gholston	4 × 400 meters relay	4th	
Women's	2017 Indoor	Diamond Gause	4 × 400 meters relay	4th	
Women's	2017 Indoor	Domonique Williams	4 × 400 meters relay	4th	
Women's	2017 Indoor	Stacey Destin	High jump	4th	
Women's	2017 Indoor	Lakan Taylor	Pole vault	1st	
Women's	2017 Indoor	Quanesha Burks	Long jump	2nd	
Women's	2017 Indoor	Stacey Destin	Pentathlon	6th	
Men's	2017 Outdoor	Ruebin Walters	110 meters hurdles	2nd	
Men's	2017 Outdoor	Jereem Richards	200 meters	3rd	
Men's	2017 Outdoor	Steven Gayle	400 meters	7th	
Men's	2017 Outdoor	Will Allen	4 × 400 meters relay	6th	
Men's	2017 Outdoor	Steven Gayle	4 × 400 meters relay	6th	
Men's	2017 Outdoor	Skyler Bowden	4 × 400 meters relay	6th	
Men's	2017 Outdoor	Jereem Richards	4 × 400 meters relay	6th	
Women's	2017 Outdoor	Quanesha Burks	4 × 100 meters relay	2nd	
Women's	2017 Outdoor	Diamond Gause	4 × 100 meters relay	2nd	
Women's	2017 Outdoor	Symone Darius	4 × 100 meters relay	2nd	
Women's	2017 Outdoor	Takyera Roberson	4 × 100 meters relay	2nd	
Women's	2017 Outdoor	Stacey Destin	High jump	6th	
Women's	2017 Outdoor	Lakan Taylor	Pole vault	8th	
Men's	2018 Indoor	Vincent Kiprop	5000 meters	2nd	
Men's	2018 Indoor	Shelby McEwen	High jump	3rd	
Men's	2018 Indoor	Kord Ferguson	Shot put	6th	
Men's	2018 Indoor	Daniel Haugh	Weight throw	4th	
Men's	2018 Indoor	Daniel Haugh	Weight throw	4th	
Women's	2018 Indoor	Stacey Destin	High jump	6th	
Men's	2018 Outdoor	Ruebin Walters	110 meters hurdles	6th	
Men's	2018 Outdoor	Vincent Kiprop	10,000 meters	2nd	
Men's	2018 Outdoor	Gilbert Kigen	10,000 meters	7th	
Men's	2018 Outdoor	Shelby McEwen	High jump	2nd	
Men's	2018 Outdoor	Christian Edwards	Triple jump	6th	
Men's	2018 Outdoor	Kord Ferguson	Discus throw	4th	
Men's	2018 Outdoor	Daniel Haugh	Hammer throw	5th	
Men's	2019 Indoor	Keitavious Walter	200 meters	3rd	
Men's	2019 Indoor	Vincent Kiprop	5000 meters	5th	
Men's	2019 Indoor	Shelby McEwen	High jump	1st	
Men's	2019 Indoor	Kord Ferguson	Shot put	6th	
Women's	2019 Indoor	Tamara Clark	200 meters	2nd	
Women's	2019 Indoor	Portious Warren	Shot put	3rd	
Women's	2019 Indoor	Stacey Destin	Pentathlon	5th	
Men's	2019 Outdoor	Gilbert Kigen	5000 meters	4th	
Men's	2019 Outdoor	Gilbert Kigen	10,000 meters	2nd	
Men's	2019 Outdoor	Shelby McEwen	High jump	3rd	
Men's	2019 Outdoor	Kord Ferguson	Discus throw	3rd	
Women's	2019 Outdoor	Esther Gitahi	5000 meters	3rd	
Women's	2019 Outdoor	Daija Lampkin	4 × 100 meters relay	5th	
Women's	2019 Outdoor	Mauricia Prieto	4 × 100 meters relay	5th	
Women's	2019 Outdoor	Symone Darius	4 × 100 meters relay	5th	
Women's	2019 Outdoor	Tamara Clark	4 × 100 meters relay	5th	
Women's	2019 Outdoor	Takyera Roberson	4 × 400 meters relay	5th	
Women's	2019 Outdoor	Katie Funcheon	4 × 400 meters relay	5th	
Women's	2019 Outdoor	Mauricia Prieto	4 × 400 meters relay	5th	
Women's	2019 Outdoor	Natassha McDonald	4 × 400 meters relay	5th	
Women's	2019 Outdoor	Abigail Kwarteng	High jump	4th	
Women's	2019 Outdoor	Stacey Destin	High jump	8th	
Women's	2019 Outdoor	Portious Warren	Shot put	2nd	
Women's	2019 Outdoor	Samantha Zelden	Javelin throw	8th	
Men's	2021 Indoor	Champion Allison	400 meters	6th	
Men's	2021 Indoor	Eliud Kipsang	Mile run	2nd	
Men's	2021 Indoor	Christian Edwards	Triple jump	4th	
Men's	2021 Indoor	Bobby Colantonio	Weight throw	5th	
Men's	2021 Indoor	Jacob Spotswood	Heptathlon	7th	
Women's	2021 Indoor	Tamara Clark	200 meters	2nd	
Men's	2021 Outdoor	Robert Dunning	110 meters hurdles	1st	
Men's	2021 Outdoor	Eliud Kipsang	1500 meters	4th	
Men's	2021 Outdoor	Ryan Lipe	Pole vault	6th	
Women's	2021 Outdoor	Tamara Clark	100 meters	3rd	
Women's	2021 Outdoor	Tamara Clark	200 meters	2nd	
Women's	2021 Outdoor	Amaris Tyynismaa	1500 meters	7th	
Women's	2021 Outdoor	Mercy Chelangat	5000 meters	5th	
Women's	2021 Outdoor	Mercy Chelangat	10,000 meters	2nd	
Women's	2021 Outdoor	Daija Lampkin	4 × 100 meters relay	6th	
Women's	2021 Outdoor	Tamara Clark	4 × 100 meters relay	6th	
Women's	2021 Outdoor	D'Jai Baker	4 × 100 meters relay	6th	
Women's	2021 Outdoor	Christal Mosley	4 × 100 meters relay	6th	
Men's	2022 Indoor	Eliud Kipsang	Mile run	8th	
Men's	2022 Indoor	Emmanuel Ineh	Long jump	5th	
Men's	2022 Indoor	Isaac Odugbesan	Shot put	7th	
Men's	2022 Indoor	Bobby Colantonio	Weight throw	1st	
Women's	2022 Indoor	Mercy Chelangat	5000 meters	3rd	
Men's	2022 Outdoor	Tarsis Orogot	200 meters	5th	
Men's	2022 Outdoor	Leander Forbes	4 × 400 meters relay	3rd	
Men's	2022 Outdoor	Demetrius Jackson	4 × 400 meters relay	3rd	
Men's	2022 Outdoor	Corde Long	4 × 400 meters relay	3rd	
Men's	2022 Outdoor	Khaleb McRae	4 × 400 meters relay	3rd	
Men's	2022 Outdoor	Isaac Odugbesan	Shot put	3rd	
Men's	2022 Outdoor	Bobby Colantonio	Hammer throw	4th	
Women's	2022 Outdoor	Mercy Chelangat	5000 meters	4th	
Women's	2022 Outdoor	Mercy Chelangat	10,000 meters	1st	
Men's	2023 Indoor	Tarsis Orogot	200 meters	2nd	
Men's	2023 Indoor	Chris Robinson	4 × 400 meters relay	8th	
Men's	2023 Indoor	Demetrius Jackson	4 × 400 meters relay	8th	
Men's	2023 Indoor	Tarsis Orogot	4 × 400 meters relay	8th	
Men's	2023 Indoor	Khaleb McRae	4 × 400 meters relay	8th	
Men's	2023 Indoor	Christian Edwards	Triple jump	7th	
Men's	2023 Indoor	Bobby Colantonio	Weight throw	2nd	
Women's	2023 Indoor	Flomena Asekol	Mile run	3rd	
Women's	2023 Indoor	Hilda Olemomoi	3000 meters	5th	
Women's	2023 Indoor	Hilda Olemomoi	5000 meters	2nd	
Women's	2023 Indoor	Mercy Chelangat	5000 meters	3rd	
Men's	2023 Outdoor	Tarsis Orogot	200 meters	5th	
Men's	2023 Outdoor	Chris Robinson	400 meters hurdles	1st	
Men's	2023 Outdoor	Corde Long	400 meters hurdles	2nd	
Men's	2023 Outdoor	Chris Robinson	4 × 400 meters relay	4th	
Men's	2023 Outdoor	Tarsis Orogot	4 × 400 meters relay	4th	
Men's	2023 Outdoor	Corde Long	4 × 400 meters relay	4th	
Men's	2023 Outdoor	Khaleb McRae	4 × 400 meters relay	4th	
Women's	2023 Outdoor	Mercy Chelangat	10,000 meters	3rd	
Women's	2023 Outdoor	Hilda Olemomoi	10,000 meters	5th	
Women's	2023 Outdoor	Taylor Gorum	Hammer throw	8th	
Men's	2024 Indoor	Tarsis Orogot	200 meters	4th	
Men's	2024 Indoor	Hasani Barr	4 × 400 meters relay	5th	
Men's	2024 Indoor	Samuel Ogazi	4 × 400 meters relay	5th	
Men's	2024 Indoor	Khaleb McRae	4 × 400 meters relay	5th	
Men's	2024 Indoor	Chris Robinson	4 × 400 meters relay	5th	
Men's	2024 Indoor	Ruben Banks	Weight throw	4th	
Women's	2024 Indoor	Doris Lemngole	3000 meters	3rd	
Women's	2024 Indoor	Hilda Olemomoi	3000 meters	5th	
Women's	2024 Indoor	Hilda Olemomoi	5000 meters	3rd	
Women's	2024 Indoor	Doris Lemngole	5000 meters	4th	
Men's	2024 Outdoor	Tarsis Orogot	200 meters	4th	
Men's	2024 Outdoor	Samuel Ogazi	400 meters	2nd	
Men's	2024 Outdoor	Chris Robinson	400 meters hurdles	2nd	
Men's	2024 Outdoor	Corde Long	400 meters hurdles	6th	
Men's	2024 Outdoor	Victor Kiprop	10,000 meters	2nd	
Women's	2024 Outdoor	Doris Lemngole	3000 meters steeplechase	1st	
Women's	2024 Outdoor	Hilda Olemomoi	5000 meters	2nd	
Women's	2024 Outdoor	Hilda Olemomoi	10,000 meters	2nd	
Men's	2025 Indoor	Ruben Banks	Weight throw	7th	
Women's	2025 Indoor	Doris Lemngole	3000 meters	2nd	
Women's	2025 Indoor	Doris Lemngole	5000 meters	1st	
Men's	2025 Outdoor	Samuel Ogazi	400 meters	1st	
Men's	2025 Outdoor	Donald Chiyangwa	4 × 400 meters relay	6th	
Men's	2025 Outdoor	Oussama El Bouchayby	4 × 400 meters relay	6th	
Men's	2025 Outdoor	Peter Diebold	4 × 400 meters relay	6th	
Men's	2025 Outdoor	Samuel Ogazi	4 × 400 meters relay	6th	
Women's	2025 Outdoor	Doris Lemngole	3000 meters steeplechase	1st	
Women's	2025 Outdoor	Brenda Tuwei	10,000 meters	8th	
Women's	2025 Outdoor	MyeJoi Williams	Shot put	7th	
Women's	2025 Outdoor	Katelyn Adel	Heptathlon	8th	

== See also ==
- Category:Alabama Crimson Tide men's track and field athletes (48)
- Category:Alabama Crimson Tide women's track and field athletes (36)
