= NCAA Division I Women's Outdoor Track and Field Championships =

Annual collegiate track and field competitions

- Current season, competition or edition: 2026 NCAA Division I Outdoor Track and Field Championships
- Association: NCAA
- Sport: Track and field
- Founded: 1982; 44 years ago
- Division: Division I
- Country: United States
- Most recent champion: Georgia (2nd)
- Most titles: LSU (14)
- Broadcaster: ESPNU
- Website: NCAA.com

The NCAA Division I Women's Outdoor Track and Field Championships are the annual collegiate track and field competitions for women athletes representing Division I institutions organised by the National Collegiate Athletic Association (NCAA). It has been held every year since 1982, except for 2020.

Athletes' performances in individual championships earn points for their institutions and the team with the most points receives the NCAA team title in track and field. A separate NCAA Division I men's competition is also held, usually at the same venue and team; both of these events are separate from the NCAA Division I Women's Indoor Track and Field Championships and NCAA Division I Men's Indoor Track and Field Championships held during the winter.

The most successful team, with 14 titles, are the LSU Lady Tigers. LSU would be credited with a fifteenth title in 2012 but were disqualified when one of their athletes, Trinidadian athlete Semoy Hackett, tested positive for methylhexaneamine and was banned from international competition for two years and four months.

== Events ==
=== Track events ===
- Sprint events
  - 100 meter dash (1982–present)
  - 200 meter dash (1982–present)
  - 400 meter dash (1982–present)
- Distance events
  - 800 meter run (1982–present)
  - 1,500 meter run (1982–present)
  - 3,000 meter steeplechase (2001–present)
  - 5,000 meter run (1982–present)
  - 10,000 meter run (1982–present)
- Hurdle Events
  - 100 meter hurdles (1982–present)
  - 400 meter intermediate hurdles (1982–present)
- Relay events
  - 400 meter relay (1982–present)
  - 1,600 meter relay (1982–present)

=== Field events ===
- Jumping events
  - High jump (1982–present)
  - Pole vault (1998–present)
  - Long jump (1982–present)
  - Triple jump (1984–present)
- Throwing events
  - Shot put (1982–present)
  - Discus throw (1982–present)
  - Hammer throw (1996–present)
  - Javelin throw (1982–present)
- Multi-events
  - Heptathlon (1982–present)

=== Discontinued events ===
- Discontinued events
  - 3,000 meter run (1982–2000)

== Team Champions ==
=== Results Table ===
NCAA Division I Women's Outdoor Track and Field Championships
Year	Site (Host Team)	Host Track	Championship Results			
Year	Site (Host Team)	Host Track	Winner	Points	Runners-Up	Points
1982; Details	Provo, UT (BYU)	Clarence F. Robison Track	UCLA	153	Tennessee	126
1983; Details	Houston, TX (Houston)	Tom Tellez Track at Carl Lewis International Complex	UCLA	116½	Florida State	108
1984; Details	Eugene, OR (Oregon)	Hayward Field	Florida State	145	Tennessee	124
1985; Details	Austin, TX (Texas)	Mike A. Myers Stadium	Oregon	52	Florida State and LSU	46
1986; Details	Indianapolis, IN (IUPUI)	IU Michael A. Carroll Track & Soccer Stadium	Texas	65	Alabama	55
1987; Details	Baton Rouge, LA (LSU)	Bernie Moore Track Stadium	LSU	62	Alabama	53
1988; Details	Eugene, OR (Oregon)	Hayward Field	LSU	61	UCLA	58
1989; Details	Provo, UT (BYU)	Clarence F. Robison Track	LSU	86	UCLA	47
1990; Details	Durham, NC (Duke)	Wallace Wade Stadium	LSU	53	UCLA	46
1991; Details	Eugene, OR (Oregon)	Hayward Field	LSU	78	Texas	67
1992; Details	Austin, TX (Texas)	Mike A. Myers Stadium	LSU	87	Florida	81
1993; Details	New Orleans, LA (New Orleans)	Tad Gormley Stadium	LSU	93	Wisconsin	44
1994; Details	Boise, ID (Boise State)	Bronco Stadium	LSU	86	Texas	43
1995; Details	Knoxville, TN (Tennessee)	Tom Black Track at LaPorte Stadium	LSU	69	UCLA	58
1996; Details	Eugene, OR (Oregon)	Hayward Field	LSU	81	Texas	52
1997; Details	Bloomington, IN (Indiana)	Billy Hayes Track	LSU	63	Texas	62
1998; Details	Buffalo, NY (Buffalo)	University at Buffalo Stadium	Texas	60	UCLA	55
1999; Details	Boise, ID (Boise State)	Bronco Stadium	Texas	62	UCLA	60
2000; Details	Durham, NC (Duke)	Wallace Wade Stadium	LSU	58	USC	54
2001; Details	Eugene, OR (Oregon)	Hayward Field	USC	64	UCLA	55
2002; Details	Baton Rouge, LA (LSU)	Bernie Moore Track Stadium	South Carolina	82	UCLA	72
2003; Details	Sacramento, CA (Sacramento State)	Hornet Stadium	LSU	64	Texas	50
2004; Details	Austin, TX (Texas)	Mike A. Myers Stadium	UCLA	69	LSU	68
2005; Details	Sacramento, CA (Sacramento State)	Hornet Stadium	Texas	55	South Carolina and UCLA	48
2006; Details	Sacramento, CA (Sacramento State)	Hornet Stadium	Auburn	57	USC	38½
2007; Details	Sacramento, CA (Sacramento State)	Hornet Stadium	Arizona State	60	LSU	53
2008; Details	Des Moines, IA (Drake)	Drake Stadium	LSU	67	Arizona State	63
2009; Details	Fayetteville, AR (Arkansas)	John McDonnell Field	Texas A&M	50	Oregon	43
2010; Details	Eugene, OR (Oregon)	Hayward Field	Texas A&M	72	Oregon	57
2011; Details	Des Moines, IA (Drake)	Drake Stadium	Texas A&M	49	Oregon	45
2012; Details	Des Moines, IA (Drake)	Drake Stadium	LSU†	76	Oregon	62
2013; Details	Eugene, OR (Oregon)	Hayward Field	Kansas	60	Texas A&M	46
2014; Details	Eugene, OR (Oregon)	Hayward Field	Texas A&M	75	Texas	66
2015; Details	Eugene, OR (Oregon)	Hayward Field	Oregon	59	Kentucky	50
2016; Details	Eugene, OR (Oregon)	Hayward Field	Arkansas	72	Oregon	62
2017; Details	Eugene, OR (Oregon)	Hayward Field	Oregon	64	Georgia	62.2
2018; Details	Eugene, OR (Oregon)	Hayward Field	USC	53	Georgia	52
2019; Details	Austin, TX (Texas)	Mike A. Myers Stadium	Arkansas	64	USC	57
2020; Details	Austin, TX (Texas)	Mike A. Myers Stadium	Not held due to the coronavirus pandemic			
2021; Details	Eugene, OR (Oregon)	Hayward Field	USC	74	Texas A&M	63
2022; Details	Eugene, OR (Oregon)	Hayward Field	Florida	74	Texas	64
2023; Details	Austin, Texas	Mike A. Myers Stadium	Texas	83	Florida	51
2024; Details	Eugene, OR (Oregon)	Hayward Field	Arkansas	63	Florida	59
2025; Details	Eugene, OR (Oregon)	Hayward Field	Georgia	73	USC	47

- † Title revoked due to positive drug tests.

== Appearances ==
This list consists of the top twenty-seven women's college outdoor track and field teams in terms of appearances in the NCAA Division I Women's Outdoor Track and Field Championship.

Top 27 rankings as of 14 June 2025
Rank	Logo	Team	Appearances
1		Stanford	43
2		Florida	42
2		LSU	42
2		Oregon	42
2		Texas	42
2		USC	42
7		Nebraska	40
7		Tennessee	40
7		UCLA	40
10		Arizona	39
10		BYU	39
12		Florida State	38
13	style="text-align:center"	Arkansas	37
13		Colorado	37
15		Alabama	36
15		Georgia	36
17		Arizona State	35
17		Auburn	35
17		Kansas State	35
20		Wisconsin	34
20		Texas A&M	34
22		Washington	33
23		North Carolina	32
23		Oklahoma	32
25		Baylor	31
25		California	31
25		Rice	31

== Team titles ==
Team	Titles	Year Won
LSU	14	1987, 1988, 1989, 1990, 1991, 1992, 1993, 1994, 1995, 1996, 1997, 2000, 2003, 2008
Texas	5	1986, 1998, 1999, 2005, 2023
Texas A&M	4	2009, 2010, 2011, 2014
UCLA	3	1982, 1983, 2004
Oregon	3	1985, 2015, 2017
USC	3	2001, 2018, 2021
Arkansas	3	2016, 2019, 2024
Georgia	1	2025, 2026
Florida	1	2022
Arizona State	1	2007
Auburn	1	2006
Florida State	1	1984
Kansas	1	2013
South Carolina	1	2002

== Championship records ==
Event	Record	Athlete	Team	Date	Meet	Place	Ref.
100 m	10.63 (+1.9 m/s)	(British Virgin Islands) Adaejah Hodge	Georgia	11 June 2026	2026 Championships	Eugene, Oregon	
200 m	21.68 (−0.4 m/s)	(British Virgin Islands) Adaejah Hodge	Georgia	13 June 2026	2026 Championships	Eugene, Oregon	
400 m	48.79	(Jamaica) Dejanea Oakley	Georgia	13 June 2026	2026 Championships	Eugene, Oregon	
800 m	1:56.85	(The Gambia) Sanu Jallow	Arkansas	13 June 2026	2026 Championships	Eugene, Oregon	
1500 m	4:05.98	Sinclaire Johnson	OSU	8 June 2019	2019 Championships	Austin	
5000 m	14:52.18	Parker Valby	Florida	8 June 2024	2024 Championships	Eugene, Oregon	
10,000 m	31:17.82	(Kenya) Pamela Kosgei	New Mexico	12 June 2025	2025 Championships	Eugene, Oregon	
100 m hurdles	12.39 (+1.7 m/s)	Brianna Rollins	Clemson	8 June 2013	2013 Championships	Eugene, Oregon	
400 m hurdles	52.46	(Canada) Savannah Sutherland	Michigan	14 June 2025	2025 Championships	Eugene, Oregon	
3000 m steeplechase	8:58.15	(Kenya) Doris Lemngole	Alabama	14 June 2025	2025 Championships	Eugene, Oregon	
High jump	1.97 m (6 ft 5 1/2 in)	(Ghana) Rose Yeboah	Illinois	8 June 2024	2024 Championships	Eugene, Oregon	
High jump	1.97 m (6 ft 5 1/2 in)	(Cyprus) Elena Kulichenko	Georgia	8 June 2024	2024 Championships	Eugene, Oregon	
High jump	1.97 m (6 ft 5 1/2 in)	(Nigeria) Temitope Adeshina	Texas Tech	8 June 2024	2024 Championships	Eugene, Oregon	
Pole vault	4.84 m (15 ft 10 1/2 in)	Amanda Moll	Washington	11 June 2026	2026 Championships	Eugene, Oregon	
Long jump	7.06 m (23 ft 1 3/4 in) (+0.2 m/s)	Alyssa Jones	Stanford	11 June 2026	2026 Championships	Eugene, Oregon	
Triple jump	14.78 m (48 ft 5 3/4 in) (+1.3 m/s)	Jasmine Moore	Florida Gators	10 June 2023	2023 Championships	Austin, Texas	
Shot put	19.92 m (65 ft 4 1/4 in)	(Sweden) Axelina Johansson	Nebraska	11 June 2026	2026 Championships	Eugene, Oregon	
Discus throw	65.98 m (216 ft 5 1/2 in)	(Netherlands) Alida van Daalen	Florida	13 June 2026	2026 Championships	Eugene, Oregon	
Hammer throw	77.67 m (254 ft 9 3/4 in)	(Canada) Camryn Rogers	California	9 June 2022	2022 Championships	Eugene, Oregon	
Javelin throw	64.19 m (210 ft 7 in)	(The Bahamas) Rhema Otabor	Nebraska	6 June 2024	2024 Championships	Eugene, Oregon	
Heptathlon	6440 pts	(Canada) Brianne Theisen	Oregon	6–7 June 2012	2012 Championships	Eugene, Oregon	
Heptathlon	100m H (wind) / High jump / Shot put / 200m (wind) / Long jump (wind) / Javelin / 800m; 13.30 (−0.4 m/s) / 1.84 m (6 ft 1/4 in) / 12.92 m (42 ft 4 1/2 in) / 24.09 (+1.1 m/s) / 6.28 m (20 ft 7 in) (+1.7 m/s) / 46.38 m (152 ft 1 3/4 in) / 2:13.81						
4 × 100 m	41.55	(Saint Lucia) Julien Alfred; Ezinne Abba (Republic of Ireland) Rhasidat Adeleke (Jamaica) Kevona Davis	Texas	8 June 2023	2023 Championships	Austin, Texas	
4 × 400 m	3:17.96	(United Kingdom) Amber Anning; Rosey Effiong (Jamaica) Nickisha Pryce; Kaylyn Brown	Arkansas	8 June 2024	2024 Championships	Eugene, Oregon	

== See also ==
- AIAW Intercollegiate Women's Outdoor Track and Field Champions
- NCAA Men's Outdoor Track and Field Championship (Division I, Division II, Division III)
- NCAA Women's Outdoor Track and Field Championship (Division II, Division III)
- NCAA Men's Indoor Track and Field Championship (Division I, Division II, Division III)
- NCAA Women's Indoor Track and Field Championships (Division I, Division II, Division III)
- Pre-NCAA Outdoor Track and Field Champions
