= 2023 NCAA Division I Indoor Track and Field Championships =

College track and field competition

- Dates: March 10–11, 2023
- Host city: Albuquerque, New Mexico
- Venue: Albuquerque Convention Center Indoor Track
- Events: 34
- Participation: 650 selected athletes

The 2023 NCAA Division I Indoor Track and Field Championships were the 58th NCAA Division I Men's Indoor Track and Field Championships and the 41st NCAA Division I Women's Indoor Track and Field Championships, held at the Albuquerque Convention Center in Albuquerque, New Mexico, on the indoor track. The field consisted of 17 different men's and women's indoor track and field events with a total of 650 participants contested from March 10 to March 11, 2023.

== Streaming and TV coverage ==
ESPN streamed the event on ESPN+. On March 12, a replay of the championships was broadcast at 9 P.M. Eastern Time on ESPNU.

== Results ==
=== Men's results ===
==== 60 meters ====
- Final results shown, not prelims

Rank	Name	University	Time	Team score
1st place, gold medalist(s)	(The Bahamas) Terrence Jones	Texas Tech	6.46	10
2nd place, silver medalist(s)	(United States) Jordan Anthony	Kentucky	6.55	8
3rd place, bronze medalist(s)	(United States) PJ Austin	Florida	6.56	6
4	(South Africa) Shaun Maswanganyi	Houston	6.57	5
5	(Ivory Coast) Ismael Kone	Florida State	6.58	4
6	(United States) Alex Lang	NC State	6.59 (6.583)	3
7	(United States) Lawrence Johnson	Wisconsin	6.59 (6.588)	2
-	(Nigeria) Favour Ashe	Auburn	DNS	-

==== 200 meters ====
- Final results shown, not prelims

Rank	Name	University	Time	Team score
1st place, gold medalist(s)	Matthew Boling	Georgia	20.12	10
2nd place, silver medalist(s)	Tarsis Orogot	Alabama	20.20	8
3rd place, bronze medalist(s)	Robert Gregory	Florida	20.22	6
4	Cameron Miller	Louisville	20.29	5
5	Udodi Onwuzurike	Stanford	20.36 (20.353)	4
6	Jacory Patterson	Florida	20.36 (20.357)	3
7	Amir Willis	Florida State	20.56	2
8	Lance Lang	Arkansas	20.75	1

==== 400 meters ====
- Final results shown, not prelims

Rank	Name	University	Time	Team score
1st place, gold medalist(s)	Elija Godwin	Georgia	44.75	10
2nd place, silver medalist(s)	Ryan Willie	Florida	44.93	8
3rd place, bronze medalist(s)	Matthew Moorer	Baylor	45.08	6
4	Emmanuel Bynum	Tennessee	45.30	5
5	Christopher Bailey	Arkansas	45.32	4
6	Nathaniel Ezekiel	Baylor	45.73	3
7	Michael Joseph	Kansas	47.18	2
-	Hasani Barr	Baylor	DNF	-

==== 800 meters ====
- Final results shown, not prelims

Rank	Name	University	Time	Team score
1st place, gold medalist(s)	Yusuf Bizimana	Texas	1:46.02	10
2nd place, silver medalist(s)	Crayton Corroza	Texas	1:46.78	8
3rd place, bronze medalist(s)	Handal Roban	Penn State	1:47.28	6
4	Tarees Rhodan	Clemson	1:47.35	5
5	Sam Austin	Florida	1:48.19	4
6	Baylor Franklin	Ole Miss	1:48.21	3
7	Will Sumner	Georgia	1:51.46	2
-	Navasky Anderson	Ole Miss	DQ (R: 7.5-3a)	-

==== Mile ====
- Final results shown, not prelims

Rank	Name	University	Time	Team score
1st place, gold medalist(s)	Luke Houser	Washington	4:03.33	10
2nd place, silver medalist(s)	Isaac Basten	Drake	4:03.36	8
3rd place, bronze medalist(s)	Anass Essayi	South Carolina	4:03.61	6
4	Joe Waskom	Washington	4:03.73	5
5	Nathan Green	Washington	4:03.86	4
6	Conor Murphy	Virginia	4:04.22	3
7	Elliot Cook	Oregon	4:04.27	2
8	Brian Fay	Washington	4:05.07	1
9	Nick Foster	Michigan	4:05.58	
10	Thomas Vanoppen	Wake Forest	DNS	

==== 3000 meters ====
- Final results shown, not prelims

Rank	Name	University	Time	Team score
1st place, gold medalist(s)	Fouad Messaoudi	Oklahoma State	7:48.10	10
2nd place, silver medalist(s)	Drew Bosley	Northern Arizona	7:48.34	8
3rd place, bronze medalist(s)	Jackson Sharp	Wisconsin	7:48.66	6
4	Casey Clinger	BYU	7:49.37	5
5	Alex Maier	Oklahoma State	7:50.74	4
6	Dylan Jacobs	Tennessee	7:52.25	3
7	Jesse Hamlin	Butler	8:01.22	2
8	Kieran Lumb	Washington	8:02.63	1
9	Duncan Hamilton	Montana	8:02.71	
10	Ky Robinson	Stanford	8:03.87	
11	Sam Gilman	Air Force	8:05.67	
12	Yaseen Abdalla	Tennessee	8:06.72	
13	Graham Blanks	Harvard	8:10.11	
14	Ryan Schoppe	Oklahoma State	8:12.19	
15	Brian Fay	Washington	8:17.60	
-	Anass Essayi	South Carolina	DNS	

==== 5000 meters ====
- Final results shown, not prelims

Rank	Name	University	Time	Team score
1st place, gold medalist(s)	Dylan Jacobs	Tennessee	13:37.59	10
2nd place, silver medalist(s)	Casey Clinger	BYU	13:38.12	8
3rd place, bronze medalist(s)	Drew Bosley	Northern Arizona	13:38.62	6
4	Nico Young	Northern Arizona	13:40.55	5
5	Parker Wolfe	North Carolina	13:43.69	4
6	Patrick Kiprop	Arkansas	13:45.16	3
7	Ky Robinson	Stanford	13:47.11	2
8	Alex Maier	Oklahoma State	13:52.50	1
9	Charles Hicks	Stanford	14:01.34	
10	Joey Nokes	BYU	14:01.43	
11	Barry Keane	Butler	14:10.13	
12	Acer Iverson	Harvard	14:18.88	
13	Graham Blanks	Harvard	14:19.55	
14	Carter Solomon	Notre Dame	14:37.57	
15	Devin Hart	Stanford	14:38.37	
16	Isai Rodriguez	Oklahoma State	14:56.13	

==== 60 meter hurdles ====
- Final results shown, not prelims

Rank	Name	University	Time	Team score
1st place, gold medalist(s)	Giano Roberts	Clemson	7.55	10
2nd place, silver medalist(s)	Caleb Dean	Texas Tech	7.59	8
3rd place, bronze medalist(s)	Darius Luff	Nebraska	7.60	6
4	Jaheem Hayles	Syracuse	7.61	5
5	Josh Brockman	NC State	7.67	4
6	Antoine Andrews	Texas Tech	7.73	3
7	Jerome Campbell	Northern Colorado	7.99	2
-	Omotade Ojora	USC	DNF	

==== 4 x 400 meters relay ====
- Final results shown, not prelims

Rank	University	Time	Team score
1st place, gold medalist(s)	Arkansas	3:02:09	10
2nd place, silver medalist(s)	Georgia	3:03.10	8
3rd place, bronze medalist(s)	USC	3:03.16	6
4	Arizona State	3:03.58	5
5	Baylor	3:03.60	4
6	Texas A&M	3:03.88	3
7	Florida	3:03.96	2
8	Alabama	3:04.42	1
9	Clemson	3:05.20	
10	Tennessee	3:08.61	
-	Oklahoma	DQ (R: 7.5-3a)	
-	UCLA	DQ (R: 7.5-2b)	

==== Distance medley relay ====
- Final results shown, not prelims

Rank	University	Time	Team score
1st place, gold medalist(s)	Oklahoma State	9:28.77	10
2nd place, silver medalist(s)	Ole Miss	9:31.63	8
3rd place, bronze medalist(s)	Wisconsin	9:31.77	6
4	Washington	9:31.97	5
5	Indiana	9:33.32	4
6	North Carolina	9:33.68	3
7	Arkansas	9:34.82	2
8	BYU	9:39.45	1
9	Michigan	9:41.65	
10	Texas	9:52.29	
11	Villanova	9:55.89	
	Tennessee	DQ R:7.5-3a	

==== High jump ====
- Final results shown, not prelims

Rank	Name	University	Best jump	Team score
1st place, gold medalist(s)	Romaine Beckford	South Florida	2.24 m (7 ft 4 in)	10
2nd place, silver medalist(s)	Vernon Turner	Oklahoma	2.21 m (7 ft 3 in)	8
3rd place, bronze medalist(s)	Devin Loudermilk	Kansas	2.21 m (7 ft 3 in)	5.5
3rd place, bronze medalist(s)	Trey Allen	Louisville	2.21 m (7 ft 3 in)	5.5
5	Ushan Perera	Texas A&M	2.18 m (7 ft 1 3/4 in)	4
6	Tony Jones	Mississippi State	2.18 m (7 ft 1 3/4 in)	3
7	Brady Palen	Wichita State	2.18 m (7 ft 1 3/4 in)	0.75
7	Ali Eren Unlu	ULM	2.18 m (7 ft 1 3/4 in)	0.75
7	Mayson Connor	Nebraska	2.18 m (7 ft 1 3/4 in)	0.75
7	Roberto Vilches	Missouri	2.18 m (7 ft 1 3/4 in)	0.75
11	Slavko Stevic	SE Louisiana	2.15 m (7 ft 1/2 in)	
11	Shaun Miller Jr.	Ohio State	2.15 m (7 ft 1/2 in)	
13	Omamuyovwi Erhire	Texas Tech	2.15 m (7 ft 1/2 in)	
14	Dontavious Hill	Auburn	2.15 m (7 ft 1/2 in)	
15	Kennedy Sauder	Liberty	2.15 m (7 ft 1/2 in)	
16	Brion Stephens	Louisville	2.10 m (6 ft 10 1/2 in)	

==== Pole vault ====
- Final results shown, not prelims

Rank	Name	University	Best jump	Team score
1st place, gold medalist(s)	Sondre Guttormsen	Princeton	6.00 m (19 ft 8 in)	10
2nd place, silver medalist(s)	Zach Bradford	Texas Tech	5.91 m (19 ft 4 1/2 in)	8
3rd place, bronze medalist(s)	Kyle Rademeyer	South Alabama	5.71 m (18 ft 8 3/4 in)	6
4	Trever Stephenson	Michigan State	5.66 m (18 ft 6 3/4 in)	5
5	Clayton Simms	Kansas	5.61 m (18 ft 4 3/4 in)	4
6	Caleb Witsken	BYU	5.61 m (18 ft 4 3/4 in)	3
7	Keaton Daniel	Kentucky	5.56 m (18 ft 2 3/4 in)	2
8	Garrett Brown	Stanford	5.56 m (18 ft 2 3/4 in)	1
9	Dorian Chaigneau	Youngstown State	5.51 m (18 ft 3/4 in)	
10	Alexander Slinkman	Rice	5.51 m (18 ft 3/4 in)	
11	Christyan Sampy	Houston	5.51 m (18 ft 3/4 in)	
12	Hunter Garretson	Akron	5.51 m (18 ft 3/4 in)	
13	Jacob Englar	Washington	5.46 m (17 ft 10 3/4 in)	
14	Cole Riddle	Memphis	5.31 m (17 ft 5 in)	
15	Wyatt Lefker	Youngstown State	5.31 m (17 ft 5 in)	
-	Branson Ellis	Stephen F. Austin	NH	

==== Long jump ====
- Final results shown, not prelims

Rank	Name	University	Best jump	Team score
1st place, gold medalist(s)	Carey McLeod	Arkansas	8.40 m (27 ft 6 1/2 in)	10
2nd place, silver medalist(s)	Cameron Crump	Mississippi State	8.39 m (27 ft 6 1/4 in)	8
3rd place, bronze medalist(s)	Jeremiah Davis	Florida State	8.37 m (27 ft 5 1/2 in)	6
4	Wayne Pinnock	Arkansas	8.33 m (27 ft 3 3/4 in)	5
5	Johnny Brackins	USC	8.16 m (26 ft 9 1/4 in)	4
6	Caleb Foster	Florida	8.05 m (26 ft 4 3/4 in)	3
7	PJ Austin	Florida	8.01 m (26 ft 3 1/4 in)	2
8	Solomon Washington	Texas	7.97 m (26 ft 1 3/4 in)	1
9	Sincere Robinson	Rutgers	7.84 m (25 ft 8 1/2 in)	
10	James Carter	Iowa	7.80 m (25 ft 7 in)	
11	Nikaoli Williams	Oklahoma	7.79 m (25 ft 6 1/2 in)	
12	Brandon Hicklin	LSU	7.73 m (25 ft 4 1/4 in)	
13	Jake Burkey	New Mexico	7.65 m (25 ft 1 in)	
14	Mitchell Effing	Northern Arizona	7.55 m (24 ft 9 in)	
15	Greg Foster	Princeton	7.51 m (24 ft 7 1/2 in)	
16	Stacy Brown Jr.	Texas	7.35 m (24 ft 1 1/4 in)	

==== Triple jump ====
- Final results shown, not prelims

Rank	Name	University	Best jump	Team score
1st place, gold medalist(s)	Jaydon Hibbert	Arkansas	17.54 m (57 ft 6 1/2 in)	10
2nd place, silver medalist(s)	Salif Mane	Fairleigh Dickinson	16.79 m (55 ft 1 in)	8
3rd place, bronze medalist(s)	Owayne Owens	Virginia	16.69 m (54 ft 9 in)	6
4	Clarence Foote-Talley	Ohio State	16.58 m (54 ft 4 3/4 in)	5
5	Jeremiah Davis	Florida State	16.38 m (53 ft 8 3/4 in)	4
6	Carey McLeod	Arkansas	16.35 m (53 ft 7 1/2 in)	3
7	Christian Edwards	Alabama	16.33 m (53 ft 6 3/4 in)	2
8	Russell Robinson	Miami (FL)	16.30 m (53 ft 5 1/2 in)	1
9	Jaren Holmes	TCU	16.23 m (53 ft 2 3/4 in)	
10	Chris Welch	Texas Tech	16.19 m (53 ft 1 1/4 in)	
11	Apalos Edwards	LSU	16.17 m (53 ft 1/2 in)	
12	Luke Brown	Kentucky	16.17 m (53 ft 1/2 in)	
13	Jaden Patterson	Kansas	16.10 m (52 ft 9 3/4 in)	
14	Sean Dixon-Bodie	Florida	15.96 m (52 ft 4 1/4 in)	
15	Chauncey Chambers	Virginia Tech	15.94 m (52 ft 3 1/2 in)	
16	James Carter	Iowa	15.55 m (51 ft 0 in)	

==== Shot put ====
- Final results shown, not prelims

Rank	Name	University	Best throw	Team score
1st place, gold medalist(s)	Jordan Geist	Arizona	21.15 m (69 ft 4 1/2 in)	10
2nd place, silver medalist(s)	Jonah Wilson	Nebraska	20.91 m (68 ft 7 in)	8
3rd place, bronze medalist(s)	Turner Washington	Arizona State	20.72 m (67 ft 11 1/2 in)	6
4	Maxwell Otterdahl	Nebraska	20.62 m (67 ft 7 3/4 in)	5
5	Jordan West	Arkansas	20.47 m (67 ft 1 3/4 in)	4
6	Fred Moudani	Cincinnati	20.42 m (66 ft 11 3/4 in)	3
7	John Meyer	LSU	20.27 m (66 ft 6 in)	2
8	Josh Sobota	Kentucky	20.15 m (66 ft 1 1/4 in)	1
9	Patrick Larrison	Kansas	19.90 m (65 ft 3 1/4 in)	
10	Hayden Tobias	Ohio State	19.65 m (64 ft 5 1/2 in)	
11	Tarik Robinson-O'Hagan	Ole Miss	19.48 m (63 ft 10 3/4 in)	
12	Alexander Kolesnikoff	Harvard	19.46 m (63 ft 10 in)	
13	Roje Stona	Arkansas	19.38 m (63 ft 6 3/4 in)	
14	Michael Shoaf	Notre Dame	19.20 m (62 ft 11 3/4 in)	
15	Warren Barrett	Liberty	18.06 m (59 ft 3 in)	
-	Patrick Piperi	Texas	X	

==== Weight throw ====
- Final results shown, not prelims

Rank	Name	University	Best throw	Team score
1st place, gold medalist(s)	Isaiah Rogers	Kennesaw State	24.23 m (79 ft 5 3/4 in)	10
2nd place, silver medalist(s)	Bobby Colantonio	Alabama	23.40 m (76 ft 9 1/4 in)	8
3rd place, bronze medalist(s)	Tarik Robinson-O'Hagan	Ole Miss	22.96 m (75 ft 3 3/4 in)	6
4	Decio Andrade	Miami (FL)	22.54 m (73 ft 11 1/4 in)	5
5	Jayden White	Washington	22.53 m (73 ft 11 in)	4
6	Kyle Brown	Auburn	22.44 m (73 ft 7 1/4 in)	3
7	Newlyn Stephenson	Eastern Michigan	22.32 m (73 ft 2 1/2 in)	2
8	Tyler Sudduth	Illinois	22.06 m (72 ft 4 1/2 in)	1
9	Sam Coil	Wisconsin	21.96 m (72 ft 1/2 in)	
10	Kenneth Ikeji	Harvard	21.92 m (71 ft 10 3/4 in)	
11	Johnny Vanos	Purdue	21.88 m (71 ft 9 1/4 in)	
12	Cam Jones	Iowa State	21.49 m (70 ft 6 in)	
13	Andrew White	Wake Forest	21.15 m (69 ft 4 1/2 in)	
14	Maxwell Otterdahl	Nebraska	20.87 m (68 ft 5 1/2 in)	
15	Max McKhann	Stanford	20.77 m (68 ft 1 1/2 in)	
-	Jordan Geist	Arizona	X	

==== Heptathlon ====
- Final results shown, not prelims

Rank	Name	University	Overall points	60 m	LJ	SP	HJ	60 m H	PV	1000 m
1st place, gold medalist(s)	Kyle Garland	Georgia Bulldogs	6639	929; 6.87	1050; 7.96 m (26 ft 1 1/4 in)	879; 16.45 m (53 ft 11 1/2 in)	915; 2.12 m (6 ft 11 1/4 in)	1048; 7.74	960; 5.16 m (16 ft 11 in)	858; 2:41.36
2nd place, silver medalist(s)	Ayden Owens-Delerme	Arkansas	6518	000; 0.00	000; 0.00 m (0 in)	000; 0.00 m (0 in)	000; 0.00 m (0 in)	000; 0.00	000; 0.00 m (0 in)	000; 0:00.00
3rd place, bronze medalist(s)	Leo Neugebauer	Texas	6214	000; 0.00	000; 0.00 m (0 in)	000; 0.00 m (0 in)	000; 0.00 m (0 in)	000; 0.00	000; 0.00 m (0 in)	000; 0:00.00
4	Till Steinforth	Nebraska	6196	000; 0.00	000; 0.00 m (0 in)	000; 0.00 m (0 in)	000; 0.00 m (0 in)	000; 0.00	000; 0.00 m (0 in)	000; 0:00.00
5	Peyton Haack	Iowa	6048	000; 0.00	000; 0.00 m (0 in)	000; 0.00 m (0 in)	000; 0.00 m (0 in)	000; 0.00	000; 0.00 m (0 in)	000; 0:00.00
6	Yariel Soto Torrado	Arkansas	6047	000; 0.00	000; 0.00 m (0 in)	000; 0.00 m (0 in)	000; 0.00 m (0 in)	000; 0.00	000; 0.00 m (0 in)	000; 0:00.00
7	Heath Baldwin	Michigan State	6000	000; 0.00	000; 0.00 m (0 in)	000; 0.00 m (0 in)	000; 0.00 m (0 in)	000; 0.00	000; 0.00 m (0 in)	000; 0:00.00
8	Bruno Comin Pescador	Washington	5992	000; 0.00	000; 0.00 m (0 in)	000; 0.00 m (0 in)	000; 0.00 m (0 in)	000; 0.00	000; 0.00 m (0 in)	000; 0:00.00
9	Austin West	Iowa	5965	000; 0.00	000; 0.00 m (0 in)	000; 0.00 m (0 in)	000; 0.00 m (0 in)	000; 0.00	000; 0.00 m (0 in)	000; 0:00.00
10	Denim Rogers	Texas Tech	5948	000; 0.00	000; 0.00 m (0 in)	000; 0.00 m (0 in)	000; 0.00 m (0 in)	000; 0.00	000; 0.00 m (0 in)	000; 0:00.00
11	Cade Amborn	Wisconsin	5840	000; 0.00	000; 0.00 m (0 in)	000; 0.00 m (0 in)	000; 0.00 m (0 in)	000; 0.00	000; 0.00 m (0 in)	000; 0:00.00
12	Hakim McMorris	California	5052	000; 0.00	000; 0.00 m (0 in)	000; 0.00 m (0 in)	000; 0.00 m (0 in)	000; 0.00	000; 0.00 m (0 in)	000; 0:00.00
13	Johannes Erm	Georgia	4037	000; 0.00	000; 0.00 m (0 in)	000; 0.00 m (0 in)	000; 0.00 m (0 in)	000; 0.00	000; 0.00 m (0 in)	000; 0:00.00
-	Kristo Simulask	Oklahoma	DNF	000; 0.00	000; 0.00 m (0 in)	000; 0.00 m (0 in)	000; 0.00 m (0 in)	000; 0.00	000; 0.00 m (0 in)	000; 0:00.00
-	Felix Wolter	Pittsburgh	DNF	000; 0.00	000; 0.00 m (0 in)	000; 0.00 m (0 in)	000; 0.00 m (0 in)	000; 0.00	000; 0.00 m (0 in)	000; 0:00.00
-	Alex Spyridonidis	Auburn	DNF	000; 0.00	000; 0.00 m (0 in)	000; 0.00 m (0 in)	000; 0.00 m (0 in)	000; 0.00	000; 0.00 m (0 in)	000; 0:00.00

=== Men's team scores ===
- Top 10 and ties shown

Rank	University	Team score
1st place, gold medalist(s)	Arkansas	63 points
2nd place, silver medalist(s)	Georgia	40 points
3rd place, bronze medalist(s)	Florida	34 points
4	Washington	31 points
5	Texas Tech	29 points
6	Oklahoma State	25 points
6	Texas	25 points
8	Nebraska	24.75 points
9	Alabama	19 points
9	Northern Arizona	19 points

=== Women's results ===
==== 60 meters ====
- Final results shown, not prelims

Rank	Name	University	Time	Team score
1st place, gold medalist(s)	(Saint Lucia) Julien Alfred	Texas	6.94	10
2nd place, silver medalist(s)	(United States) Kaila Jackson	Georgia	7.08	8
3rd place, bronze medalist(s)	(United States) Jacious Sears	Tennessee	7.10	6
4	(United States) Autumn Wilson	Georgia	7.12	5
5	(United States) Jadyn Mays	Oregon	7.13	4
6	(Nigeria) Favour Ofili	LSU	7.17	3
7	(United States) McKenzie Long	Ole Miss	7.19	2
8	(Jamaica) Kiara Grant	Clemson	7.21	1

==== 200 meters ====
- Final results shown, not prelims

Rank	Name	University	Time	Team score
1st place, gold medalist(s)	(Saint Lucia) Julien Alfred	Texas	22.01	10
2nd place, silver medalist(s)	(Nigeria) Favour Ofili	LSU	22.20	8
3rd place, bronze medalist(s)	(United States) Autumn Wilson	Georgia	22.45	6
4	(United States) McKenzie Long	Ole Miss	22.54	5
5	(United States) Jadyn Mays	Oregon	22.63	4
6	(United States) Lanae Thomas	Texas	22.73	3
7	(United States) Caisja Chandler	USC	22.74	2
8	(United States) Kaila Jackson	Georgia	22.84	1

==== 400 meters ====
- Final results shown, not prelims

Rank	Name	University	Time	Team score
1st place, gold medalist(s)	(United States) Britton Wilson	Arkansas	49.48	10
2nd place, silver medalist(s)	(Republic of Ireland) Rhasidat Adeleke	Texas	50.45	8
3rd place, bronze medalist(s)	(United States) Talitha Diggs	Florida	50.49	6
4	(United States) Rosey Effiong	Arkansas	50.54	5
5	(United States) Jan'Taijah Jones	USC	51.03	4
6	(United Kingdom) Amber Anning	Arkansas	51.22	3
7	(Canada) Savannah Sutherland	Michigan	51.60	2
8	(United States) Jermaisha Arnold	Texas A&M	51.80	1

==== 800 meters ====
- Final results shown, not prelims

Rank	Name	University	Time	Team score
1st place, gold medalist(s)	(United States) Roisin Willis	Stanford	1:59.93	10
2nd place, silver medalist(s)	(United States) Juliette Whittaker	Stanford	2:00.05	8
3rd place, bronze medalist(s)	(United States) Michaela Rose	LSU	2:00.85	6
4	(United States) Claire Seymour	BYU	2:03.18	5
5	(United States) Sarah Hendrick	Kennesaw State	2:03.21	4
6	(United States) (Mexico) Valery Tobias	Texas	2:03.25	3
7	(Sweden) Wilma Nielsen	Bradley	2:03.34	2
8	(Canada) Aurora Rynda	Michigan	2:06.83	1

==== Mile ====
- Final results shown, not prelims

Rank	Name	University	Time	Team score
1st place, gold medalist(s)	(United States) Olivia Howell	Illinois	4:34.00	10
2nd place, silver medalist(s)	(United States) Lauren Gregory	Arkansas	4:34.24	8
3rd place, bronze medalist(s)	(Kenya) Flomena Asekol	Alabama	4:35.18	6
4	(United States) Margot Appleton	Virginia	4:35.83	5
5	(New Zealand) Maia Ramsden	Harvard	4:36.54	4
6	(Poland) Klaudia Kazimierska	Oregon	4:37.82	3
7	(Netherlands) Amina Maatoug	Duke	4:38.83	2
8	(United States) Annika Reiss	Northern Arizona	4:40.79	1
9	(Australia) Izzy Thornton-Bott	Oregon	4:44.34	
10	(United States) Lindsey Butler	Virginia Tech	4:45.65	

==== 3000 meters ====
- Final results shown, not prelims

Rank	Name	University	Time	Team score
1st place, gold medalist(s)	Katelyn Tuohy	NC State	9:10.07	10
2nd place, silver medalist(s)	Olivia Markezich	Notre Dame	9:13.01	8
3rd place, bronze medalist(s)	Taylor Roe	Oklahoma State	9:13.22	6
4	Simone Plourde	Utah	9:14.59	5
5	Hilda Olemomoi	Alabama	9:15.26	4
6	Ceili McCabe	West Virginia	9:16.05	3
7	Kelsey Chmiel	NC State	9:16.26	2
8	Maia Ramsden	Harvard	9:16.99	1
9	Samantha Bush	NC State	9:17.35	
10	Kaylee Mitchell	Oregon State	9:18.40	
11	Mercy Chelangat	Alabama	9:19.33	
12	Grace Fetherstonhaugh	Oregon State	9:19.38	
13	Sadie Sargent	BYU	9:24.19	
14	Amina Maatoug	Duke	9:38.14	
15	Lexy Halladay-Lowry	BYU	9:49.11	
-	Alexandra Carlson	Rutgers	DNF	

==== 5000 meters ====
- Final results shown, not prelims

Rank	Name	University	Time	Team score
1st place, gold medalist(s)	Katelyn Tuohy	NC State	16:09.65	10
2nd place, silver medalist(s)	Hilda Olemomoi	Alabama	16:11.08	8
3rd place, bronze medalist(s)	Mercy Chelangat	Alabama	16:11.63	6
4	Kelsey Chmiel	NC State	16:18.87	5
5	Emily Venters	Utah	16:25.28	4
6	Amanda Vestri	Syracuse	16:25.30	3
7	Gracelyn Larkin	New Mexico	16:27.76	2
8	Sydney Seymour	NC State	16:28.15	1
9	Sarah Carter	Colorado State	16:31.52	
10	Amelia Mazza-Downie	New Mexico	16:33.71	
11	Elise Stearns	Northern Arizona	16:34.04	
12	Aubrey Frentheway	BYU	16:38.77	
13	Zofia Dudek	Stanford	16:38.98	
14	Ruby Smee	San Francisco	16:41.56	
15	Ella Baran	Colorado State	16:48.53	
16	Natalie Cook	Oklahoma State	17:21.48	

==== 60 meter hurdles ====
- Final results shown, not prelims

Rank	Name	University	Time	Team score
1st place, gold medalist(s)	Ackera Nugent	Arkansas	7.73	10
2nd place, silver medalist(s)	Masai Russell	Kentucky	7.75	8
3rd place, bronze medalist(s)	Charisma Taylor	Tennessee	7.93	6
4	Leah Phillips	LSU	7.95	5
5	Demisha Roswell	Texas Tech	8.00	4
6	Aaliyah McCormick	Oregon	8.01	3
7	Talie Bonds	Arizona	8.03	2
-	Yanla Ndjip-Nyemeck	UCLA	DNF	

==== 4 x 400 meters relay ====
- Final results shown, not prelims

Rank	University	Time	Team score
1st place, gold medalist(s)	Arkansas	3:21.75	10
2nd place, silver medalist(s)	Texas	3:25.67	8
3rd place, bronze medalist(s)	Texas A&M	3:26.99	6
4	USC	3:28.58	5
5	Kentucky	3:29.08	4
6	Florida	3:29.88	3
7	South Carolina	3:30.09	2
8	Ohio State	3:30.80	1
9	Michigan	3:31.24	
10	UCLA	3:31.91	
11	LSU	3:32.21	
12	Stanford	3:32.80	

==== Distance medley relay ====
- Final results shown, not prelims

Rank	University	Time	Team score
1st place, gold medalist(s)	Stanford; Melissa Tanaka, Maya Valmon, Roisin Willis, Juliette Whittaker	10:56.34	10
2nd place, silver medalist(s)	Arkansas; Mary Ellen Eudaly, Paris Peoples, Lainey Quandt, Lauren Gregory	10:56.61	8
3rd place, bronze medalist(s)	Notre Dame; Katie Thronson, Eve Balseiro, Kaitlin Ryan, Olivia Markezich	10:59.46	6
4	UCLA; Gwyn George, Kate Jendrezak, Rose Pittman, Mia Barnett	10:59.87	5
5	Georgetown; Grace Jensen, Maya Drayton, Katy-Ann McDonald, Melissa Riggins	11:02.41	4
6	Oklahoma State; Billah Jepkirui, Tamara Woodley, Gabija Galvydyte, Taylor Roe	11:02.57	3
7	BYU; Taylor Rohatinsky, Annalise Hart, Alena Ellsworth, Sadie Sargent	11:03.55	2
8	NC State; Savannah Shaw, Caroline Lewis, Grace Hartman, Samantha Bush	11:07.72	1
9	Kentucky; Sydney Steely, Karimah Davis, Jenna Schwinghamer, Tori Herman	11:08.98	
10	Duke; Emily Cole, Megan McGinnis, Lauren Tolbert, Karly Forker	11:21.20	
11	Oregon; Izzy Thornton-Bott, Ella Clayton, Ella Nelson, Klaudia Kazimierska	11:26.40	
12	Washington; Andrea Markezich, Carley Thomas, Anna Gibson, Sophie O'Sullivan	11:36.40	

==== High jump ====
- Final results shown, not prelims

Rank	Name	University	Best jump	Team score
1st place, gold medalist(s)	Lamara Distin	Texas A&M	1.91 m (6 ft 3 in)	10
2nd place, silver medalist(s)	Rylee Anderson	Kansas	1.88 m (6 ft 2 in)	8
3rd place, bronze medalist(s)	Elena Kulichenko	Georgia	01.88 m (6 ft 2 in)	6
4	Jenna Rogers	Nebraska	01.88 m (6 ft 2 in)	5
5	Charity Griffith	Ball State	01.85 m (6 ft 3/4 in)	4
6	Nyalaam Jok	Minnesota	01.85 m (6 ft 3/4 in)	3
7	Nissi Kabongo	Stephen F. Austin	01.85 m (6 ft 3/4 in)	2
8	Cierra Tidwell	BYU	01.82 m (5 ft 11 1/2 in)	1
9	Taylor Beard	Cincinnati	01.82 m (5 ft 11 1/2 in)	
9	Amaya Ugarte	Ohio State	01.82 m (5 ft 11 1/2 in)	
9	Shanty Papakosta	Georgia Tech	01.82 m (5 ft 11 1/2 in)	
12	Katie Isenbarger	Western Kentucky	01.77 m (5 ft 9 1/2 in)	
13	Daniella Anglin	South Dakota	01.77 m (5 ft 9 1/2 in)	
14	Alexa Porpaczy	Arizona	01.77 m (5 ft 9 1/2 in)	
15	Lucy Corbett	Montana State	1.72 m (5 ft 7 1/2 in)	
16	Bara Sajdokova	Texas A&M	NH @ 01.77 m (5 ft 9 1/2 in)	

==== Pole vault ====
- Final results shown, not prelims

Rank	Name	University	Best jump	Team score
1st place, gold medalist(s)	(United States) Amanda Fassold	Arkansas	4.45 m (14 ft 7 in)	10
2nd place, silver medalist(s)	(United States) Olivia Lueking	Oklahoma	4.45 m (14 ft 7 in)	8
3rd place, bronze medalist(s)	(Estonia) Marleen Mülla	South Dakota	4.45 m (14 ft 7 in)	6
4	(United States) Kenna Stimmel	Virginia Tech	4.40 m (14 ft 5 in)	5
5	(United States) Sara Borton	Washington	4.40 m (14 ft 5 in)	4
6	(United States) Nastassja Campbell	Washington	4.40 m (14 ft 5 in)	3
7	(United States) Rachel Vesper	High Point	4.35 m (14 ft 3 1/4 in)	2
8	(United States) Gennifer Hirata	South Dakota	4.35 m (14 ft 3 1/4 in)	1
9	(United States) Chloe Timberg	Rutgers	4.30 m (14 ft 1 1/4 in)	
10	(United States) Aliyah Welter	Louisville	4.30 m (14 ft 1 1/4 in)	
11	(United States) Julia Fixsen	Virginia Tech	4.30 m (14 ft 1 1/4 in)	
12	(United States) Sydney Horn	High Point	4.20 m (13 ft 9 1/4 in)	
13	(United States) Journey Gurley	Virginia Tech	4.20 m (13 ft 9 1/4 in)	
14	(United States) Cassidy Mooneyhan	South Dakota	4.10 m (13 ft 5 1/4 in)	
	(United States) Cailee Faulkner	BYU	NH @ 04.10 m (13 ft 5 1/4 in)	
	(United States) Mackenzie Horn	High Point	NH @ 04.10 m (13 ft 5 1/4 in)	

==== Long jump ====
- Final results shown, not prelims

Rank	Name	University	Best jump	Team score
1st place, gold medalist(s)	Jasmine Moore	Florida	7.03 m (23 ft 3/4 in)	10
2nd place, silver medalist(s)	Ackelia Smith	Texas	06.88 m (22 ft 6 3/4 in)	8
3rd place, bronze medalist(s)	Claire Bryant	Florida	6.88 m (22 ft 6 3/4 in)	6
4	Alyssa Jones	Stanford	6.74 m (22 ft 1 1/4 in)	5
5	Charisma Taylor	Tennessee	6.64 m (21 ft 9 1/4 in)	4
6	Alysah Hickey	Oregon	6.48 m (21 ft 3 in)	3
7	Synclair Savage	Louisville	6.41 m (21 ft 1/4 in)	2
8	Ilse Steigenga	Pittsburgh	6.39 m (20 ft 11 1/2 in)	1
9	Paola Fernandez-Sola	Indiana	6.39 m (20 ft 11 1/2 in)	
10	Anthaya Charlton	Kentucky	6.28 m (20 ft 7 in)	
11	Emilia Sjostrand	San Jose State	6.27 m (20 ft 6 3/4 in)	
12	Titiana Marsh	Georgia	6.08 m (19 ft 11 1/4 in)	
13	Nia Robinson	South Florida	6.03 m (19 ft 9 1/4 in)	
14	Lishanna Ilves	Nebraska	6.02 m (19 ft 9 in)	
15	Oreoluwa Adamson	UTSA	5.99 m (19 ft 7 3/4 in)	
16	Esther Isa	Middle Tennessee State	5.73 m (18 ft 9 1/2 in)	

==== Triple jump ====
- Final results shown, not prelims

Rank	Name	University	Best jump	Team score
1st place, gold medalist(s)	Jasmine Moore	Florida	15.12 m (49 ft 7 1/4 in)	10
2nd place, silver medalist(s)	Charisma Taylor	Tennessee	14.88 m (48 ft 9 3/4 in)	8
3rd place, bronze medalist(s)	Ackelia Smith	Texas	14.29 m (46 ft 10 1/2 in)	6
4	Mikeisha Welcome	Georgia	14.21 m (46 ft 7 1/4 in)	5
5	Anne-Suzanna Fosther-Katta	Texas Tech	14.20 m (46 ft 7 in)	4
6	Arianna Fisher	Missouri	14.06 m (46 ft 1 1/2 in)	3
7	Emilia Sjostrand	San Jose State	13.98 m (45 ft 10 1/4 in)	2
8	Lexi Ellis	Oregon	13.97 m (45 ft 10 in)	1
9	Titiana Marsh	Georgia	13.80 m (45 ft 3 1/4 in)	
10	Grace Anigbata	TCU	13.58 m (44 ft 6 1/2 in)	
11	Onaara Obamuwagun	Texas Tech	13.55 m (44 ft 5 1/4 in)	
12	Ella Anttila	Abilene Christian	13.43 m (44 ft 1/2 in)	
13	Jaimie Robinson	Ohio State	13.37 m (43 ft 10 1/4 in)	
14	Simone Johnson	San Diego State	13.33 m (43 ft 8 3/4 in)	
15	Victoria Gorlova	Virginia Tech	13.23 m (43 ft 4 3/4 in)	
16	Elaina Housworth	Tennessee State	13.11 m (43 ft 0 in)	

==== Weight throw ====
- Final results shown, not prelims

Rank	Name	University	Best Throw	Team score
1st place, gold medalist(s)	(United States) Jalani Davis	Ole Miss	24.51m (80 ft 5 in)	10
2nd place, silver medalist(s)	(United States) Shelby Frank	Minnesota	23.42m (76 ft 10 in)	8
3rd place, bronze medalist(s)	(United States) Jasmine Mitchell	Ole Miss	23.14m (75 ft 11 in)	6
4	(United States) Chloe Lindeman	Wisconsin	22.97m (75-4½)	5
5	(United States) Taylor Latimer	Nebraska	22.90m (75-1¾)	4
6	(Jamaica) Marie Forbes	Clemson	22.63m (74–3)	3
7	(United States) Rebecca Mammel	Virginia Tech	22.54m (73-11½)	2
8	(United States) Madi Malone	Auburn	22.45m (73–8)	1
9	(United States) Chandler Hayden	Tennessee	22.29m (73-1¾)	
10	(United States) Chelsea Igberaese	Alabama	21.49m (70-6¼)	
11	(United States) Shauniece O'Neal	Southern Illinois	21.27m (69-9½)	
12	(Finland) Sara Killenen	Virginia Tech	21.23m (69–8)	
13	(United States) Olivia Roberts	Wisconsin	20.93m (68–8)	
14	(United Kingdom) Tara Simpson-Sullivan	Rice	20.47m (67–2)	
15	(United States) Taylor Gorum	Alabama	20.37m (66–10)	
	(Canada) Camryn Rogers	California	X	

==== Shot put ====
- Final results shown, not prelims

Rank	Name	University	Best throw	Team score
1st place, gold medalist(s)	Adelaide Aquilla	Ohio State	19.28 m (63 ft 3 in)	10
2nd place, silver medalist(s)	Axelina Johansson	Nebraska	19.12 m (62 ft 8 3/4 in)	8
3rd place, bronze medalist(s)	Rosa Santana	UNLV	18.43 m (60 ft 5 1/2 in)	6
4	Alida Van Daalen	Florida	18.05 m (59 ft 2 1/2 in)	5
5	Josie Schaefer	Wisconsin	18.02 m (59 ft 1 1/4 in)	4
6	Jorinde van Klinken	Oregon	17.77 m (58 ft 3 1/2 in)	3
7	Erna Gunnarsdottir	Rice	17.59 m (57 ft 8 1/2 in)	2
8	Jaida Ross	Oregon	17.56 m (57 ft 7 1/4 in)	1
9	Jalani Davis	Ole Miss	17.50 m (57 ft 4 3/4 in)	
10	Hannah Hall	University of Miami	16.86 m (55 ft 3 3/4 in)	
11	Marilyn Nwora	Texas	16.32 m (53 ft 6 1/2 in)	
12	Gabby McDonald	Colorado State	16.20 m (53 ft 1 3/4 in)	
13	Nu'uausala Tuilefano	Houston	16.10 m (52 ft 9 3/4 in)	
14	Jayden Ulrich	Indiana	16.07 m (52 ft 8 1/2 in)	
15	Jasmine Mitchell	Ole Miss	15.08 m (49 ft 5 1/2 in)	
16	KeAyla Dove	North Texas	00.00 m (0 in) Foul	

==== Pentathlon ====
- Final results shown, not prelims

Rank	Name	University	Overall points	60 m H	HJ	SP	LJ	800 m
1st place, gold medalist(s)	(United States) Jadin O'Brien	Notre Dame	4512	8.32	1.72 m (5 ft 7 1/2 in)	13.85 m (45 ft 5 1/4 in)	6.09 m (19 ft 11 3/4 in)	2:13.40
2nd place, silver medalist(s)	(United States) Allie Jones	USC	4440	8.32	1.75 m (5 ft 8 3/4 in)	12.04 m (39 ft 6 in)	6.20 m (20 ft 4 in)	2:15.09
3rd place, bronze medalist(s)	(Estonia) Pippi Lotta Enok	Oklahoma	4400	8.52	1.78 m (5 ft 10 in)	12.12 m (39 ft 9 in)	6.18 m (20 ft 3 1/4 in)	2:17.35
4	(United States) Sterling Lester	Florida	4358	8.35	1.72 m (5 ft 7 1/2 in)	11.56 m (37 ft 11 in)	6.14 m (20 ft 1 1/2 in)	2:14.21
5	(Latvia) Kristine Blazevica	Texas	4305	8.53	1.66 m (5 ft 5 1/4 in)	12.21 m (40 ft 1/2 in)	6.13 m (20 ft 1 1/4 in)	2:12.79
6	(Lithuania) Beatrice Juskeviciute	Vanderbilt	4282	8.23	1.63 m (5 ft 4 in)	13.76 m (45 ft 1 1/2 in)	5.80 m (19 ft 1/4 in)	2:16.86
7	(United States) Kristen O'Handley	Tulane	4277	8.37	1.78 m (5 ft 10 in)	11.62 m (38 ft 1 1/4 in)	5.67 m (18 ft 7 in)	2:15.05
8	(Norway) Ida Eikeng	Washington	4266	8.23	1.75 m (5 ft 8 3/4 in)	14.03 m (46 ft 1/4 in)	5.95 m (19 ft 6 1/4 in)	2:34.07
9	(Germany) Jenna Fee Feyerabend	San Diego St.	4263	8.76	1.75 m (5 ft 8 3/4 in)	13.54 m (44 ft 5 in)	6.00 m (19 ft 8 in)	2:23.80
10	(United States) Lexie Keller	Colorado St.	4217	8.70	1.72 m (5 ft 7 1/2 in)	13.28 m (43 ft 6 3/4 in)	5.72 m (18 ft 9 in)	2:17.85
11	(Canada) Izzy Goudros	Harvard	4165	8.41	1.63 m (5 ft 4 in)	11.27 m (36 ft 11 1/2 in)	6.13 m (20 ft 1 1/4 in)	2:17.78
12	(United States) Avery McMullen	Colorado	4149	8.33	1.75 m (5 ft 8 3/4 in)	11.30 m (37 ft 3/4 in)	5.95 m (19 ft 6 1/4 in)	2:27.17
13	(United States) Charity Griffith	Ball State	4138	8.68	1.81 m (5 ft 11 1/4 in)	11.90 m (39 ft 1/2 in)	5.66 m (18 ft 6 3/4 in)	2:24.13
14	(United Kingdom) Alix Still	Virginia	4034	8.44	1.60 m (5 ft 2 3/4 in)	11.47 m (37 ft 7 1/2 in)	5.87 m (19 ft 3 in)	2:19.38
DNF	(Australia) Camryn Newton-Smith	Arkansas State	--	8.35	1.78 m (5 ft 10 in)	11.69 m (38 ft 4 in)	DNS	DNS
DNF	(United States) Annika Williams	Kentucky	--	8.88	1.72 m (5 ft 7 1/2 in)	13.32 m (43 ft 8 1/4 in)	DNS	DNS

=== Women's team scores ===
- Top 10 and ties shown

Rank	University	Team score
1st place, gold medalist(s)	Arkansas	64 points
2nd place, silver medalist(s)	Texas	60 points
3rd place, bronze medalist(s)	Florida	45 points
4	Stanford	33 points
5	Georgia	31 points
6	NC State	29 points
7	Alabama	24 points
7	Notre Dame	24 points
7	Tennessee	24 points
10	Ole Miss	21 points

== Schedule ==
Men
Friday, March 10
Track events
Time MT	Event	Round Division
7:00 p.m.	Mile	Semifinal Men
7:15 p.m.	60 meters	Semifinal Men
7:25 p.m.	400 meters	Semifinal Men
7:45 p.m.	800 meters	Semifinal Men
7:55 p.m.	60 meter hurdles	Semifinal Men
8:05 p.m.	5000 meters	Final Men
8:25 p.m.	200 meters	Semifinal Men
8:45 p.m.	Distance medley relay	Final Men
Field events
Time MT	Event	Round Division
6:00 p.m.	Pole vault	Final Men
7:00 p.m.	Long jump	Final Men
7:00 p.m.	Weight throw	Final Men
Men Heptathlon
Time MT	Event	Round Division
10:00 a.m.	60 meters	Heptathlon Men
11:00 a.m.	Long jump	Heptathlon Men
12:15 p.m.	Shot put	Heptathlon Men
1:30 p.m.	High jump	Heptathlon Men
Saturday, March 11
Track events
Time MT	Event	Round Division
7:00 p.m.	Mile	Final Men
7:10 p.m.	60 meters	Final Men
7:20 p.m.	400 meters	Final Men
7:30 p.m.	800 meters	Final Men
7:40 p.m.	60 meter hurdles	Final Men
7:50 p.m.	200 meters	Final Men
8:00 p.m.	3000 meters	Final Men
8:20 p.m.	4x400 meters relay	Final Men
Field events
Time MT	Event	Round Division
1:00 p.m.	High jump	Final Men
6:45 p.m.	Triple jump	Final Men
7:00 p.m.	Shot put	Final Men
Men Heptathlon
Time MT	Event	Round Division
10:30 a.m.	60 meter hurdles	Heptathlon Men
11:30 a.m.	Pole vault	Heptathlon Men
3:30 p.m.	1000 meters	Heptathlon Men

Women
Friday, March 10
Track events
Time MT	Event	Round Division
4:00 p.m.	Mile	Semifinal Women
4:15 p.m.	60 meters	Semifinal Women
4:25 p.m.	400 meters	Semifinal Women
4:45 p.m.	800 meters	Semifinal Women
4:55 p.m.	60 meter hurdles	Semifinal Women
5:05 p.m.	5000 meters	Final Women
5:25 p.m.	200 meters	Semifinal Women
5:45 p.m.	Distance medley relay	Final Women
Field events
Time MT	Event	Round Division
2:00 p.m.	Pole vault	Final Women
4:00 p.m.	Long jump	Final Women
4:00 p.m.	Weight throw	Final Women
Women Pentathlon
Time MT	Event	Round Division
10:20 a.m.	60 meters	Pentathlon Women
11:30 a.m.	High jump	Pentathlon Women
1:30 p.m.	Shot put	Pentathlon Women
2:30 p.m.	Long jump	Pentathlon Women
3:40 p.m.	800 meters	Pentathlon Women
Saturday, March 11
Track events
Time MT	Event	Round Division
4:00 p.m.	Mile	Final Women
4:10 p.m.	60 meters	Final Women
4:20 p.m.	400 meters	Final Women
4:30 p.m.	800 meters	Final Women
4:40 p.m.	60 meter hurdles	Final Women
4:50 p.m.	200 meters	Final Women
5:00 p.m.	3000 meters	Final Women
5:20 p.m.	4x400 meters relay	Final Women
Field events
Time MT	Event	Round Division
1:00 p.m.	High jump	Final Women
3:45 p.m.	Triple jump	Final Women
4:00 p.m.	Shot put	Final Women

== See also ==
- National Collegiate Athletic Association (NCAA)
- NCAA Men's Division I Indoor Track and Field Championships
- NCAA Women's Division I Indoor Track and Field Championships
