= Maxwell Peters =

Antigua and Barbuda triple jumper

Personal information
- Nationality: Antigua and Barbuda
- Born: 22 September 1955 (age 70)

Sport
- Sport: Athletics
- Event: Triple jump

Maxwell Peters (born 22 September 1955) is an Antigua and Barbuda athlete. He competed in the men's triple jump at the 1976 Summer Olympics.

Peters was an NJCAA champion triple jumper for the Essex Wolverines track and field team. He was later an All-American for the Alabama Crimson Tide track and field team, finishing 5th in the triple jump at the 1978 NCAA Division I Outdoor Track and Field Championships and 1979 NCAA Division I Outdoor Track and Field Championships.
