= 1983 NCAA Division I Outdoor Track and Field Championships =

- Men's Champion: SMU (1st title); Women's Champion: UCLA (2nd title)
- Edition: 62nd (Men); 2nd (Women)
- Dates: May 30 − June 4, 1983
- Host city: Houston, Texas
- Venue: Robertson Stadium; University of Houston

The 1983 NCAA Division I Outdoor Track and Field Championships were contested May 30 − June 4, 1983 at Robertson Stadium at the University of Houston in Houston, Texas in order to determine the individual and team national champions of men's and women's collegiate Division I outdoor track and field events in the United States.

These were the 62nd annual men's championships and the second annual women's championships. This was Houston's first time hosting the event.

SMU and UCLA topped the men's and women's team standings, respectively; the Mustangs claimed their first team title while the Bruins' took home their second consecutive and second overall.

== Team results ==
- Note: Top 10 only
- (H) = Hosts

=== Men's title ===
Rank	Team	Points
1st place, gold medalist(s)	SMU	104
2nd place, silver medalist(s)	Tennessee	102
3rd place, bronze medalist(s)	Alabama	88
4	UTEP	84 1/2
5	Washington State	66
6	Oregon	59 1/2
7	Arkansas	59
8	Iowa State	49 1/2
9	Texas	49
10	USC	40

=== Women's title ===
Rank	Team	Points
1st place, gold medalist(s)	UCLA	116 1/2
2nd place, silver medalist(s)	Florida State	108
3rd place, bronze medalist(s)	Nebraska	106 2/3
4	Tennessee	87
5	Oregon	66
6	Stanford	60
7	Cal State Los Angeles	59
8	Houston (H)	52
9	Arizona	47
10	NC State; Virginia	37
