= 1986 NCAA Division I Outdoor Track and Field Championships =

- Men's Champion: SMU (2nd title); Women's Champion: Texas (1st title)
- Edition: 65th (Men); 5th (Women)
- Dates: June 4−7, 1986
- Host city: Indianapolis, Indiana
- Venue: Carroll Stadium; Indiana University

The 1986 NCAA Division I Outdoor Track and Field Championships were contested June 4−7, 1986 at Carroll Stadium in Indianapolis, Indiana, in order to determine the individual and team national champions of men's and women's collegiate Division I outdoor track and field events in the United States.

These were the 65th annual men's championships and the fifth annual women's championships. Even though these championships were contested in Indianapolis, they were technically hosted by Indiana University Bloomington. Carroll Stadium, the event's site, is actually located near IUPUI, another school belonging to the Indiana University system. This was the Hoosiers' second time hosting the event and the first since 1966 (held in Bloomington).

Southern Methodist University and Texas topped the men's and women's team standings, respectively; it was the Mustangs' second men's team title and the first for the Longhorn women.

The competition was remembered for NC State Wolfpack track and field runner Kathy Ormsby, who left the track during the women's 10,000 meters and jumped head-first off a nearby bridge, permanently paralyzing herself from the waist down. Ormsby had set the collegiate record in the event earlier in the season.

== Team results ==
- Note: Top 10 only
- (H) = Hosts

=== Men's standings ===
| Rank | Team | Points |
|---|---|---|
| 1st place, gold medalist(s) | SMU | 53 |
| 2nd place, silver medalist(s) | Washington State | 52 |
| 3rd place, bronze medalist(s) | Texas | 47 |
| 4 | Alabama; Arkansas | 35 |
| 6 | Texas A&M | 31 |
| 7 | Oregon | 30 |
| 8 | UCLA | 29 |
| 9 | USC | 27 1/2 |
| 10 | Fresno State; UTEP | 25 |

=== Women's standings ===
| Rank | Team | Points |
|---|---|---|
| 1st place, gold medalist(s) | Texas | 65 |
| 2nd place, silver medalist(s) | Alabama | 55 |
| 3rd place, bronze medalist(s) | Texas Southern | 47 |
| 4 | USC; Tennessee | 37 |
| 6 | Stanford | 29 |
| 7 | UCLA; Wisconsin | 25 |
| 9 | Florida | 21 |
| 10 | Washington State | 20 |
