= Evelyn Adiru =

Ugandan middle-distance runner

Personal information
- Born: 25 May 1964 (age 62) Kampala, Uganda
- Height: 1.62 m (5 ft 4 in)
- Weight: 50 kg (110 lb)

Sport
- Country: Uganda
- Sport: Athletics
- Events: 800 m; 1500 m

Achievements and titles
- Personal bests: 800 m: 2:05.39; 1500: 4:09.61
Medal record
Women's athletics
Representing Uganda
African Championships
Gold medal – first place	1982 Cairo	800 m
Silver medal – second place	1982 Cairo	4×400 m
All-Africa Games
Bronze medal – third place	1987 Nairobi	1500 m
Bronze medal – third place	1987 Nairobi	4×400 m

Evelyn Adiru (born 25 May 1964) is a former middle-distance runner from Uganda who specialised in the 800 metres and 1500 metres events. She won gold medal in 800 metres at the 1982 African Championships in Athletics in Cairo. She also competed for Uganda in the 1984 Summer Olympics in the same event, but did not progress to the finals.

Adiru was a member of the University of Alabama track and field team from 1984 to 1989. Later, she settled in Ontario, Canada with her Ugandan husband. Adiru's daughter, Sura Yekka, is a member of the University of Michigan women's soccer team and the Canadian women's national soccer team.

== Achievements ==
Year	Competition	Venue	Position	Event	Notes
1982	African Championships	Cairo, Egypt	1st	800 m	2:07.00
1984	Summer Olympics	Los Angeles, United States	21st	800 m	2:07.39
1987	All-Africa Games	Nairobi, Kenya	3rd	1500 m	4:17.87
1987	All-Africa Games	Nairobi, Kenya	3rd	4 × 400 m relay	3:34.41
1987	World Championships	Rome, Italy	27th	1500 m	4:17.72
