= Grace Buzu =

Ugandan sprinter

Personal information
- Nationality: Ugandan
- Born: 6 October 1968 (age 57)

Sport
- Sport: Sprinting
- Event: 4 × 100 metres relay
Medal record
Women's athletics
Representing Uganda
African Championships
Gold medal – first place	1988 Annaba	4×400 m

Grace Buzu (born 6 October 1968) is a Ugandan hurdler and sprinter. She competed in the women's 4 × 100 metres relay at the 1988 Summer Olympics. Buzu won a bronze medal in the 4 x 100 metres relay at the 1987 All-Africa Games.

Buzu ran the 400 metres hurdles for the University of Alabama in the NCAA. She was also an All-American sprinter for the Alabama Crimson Tide track and field team, finishing 4th in the 4 × 400 metres relay at the 1991 NCAA Division I Outdoor Track and Field Championships.
