= Íris Grönfeldt =

Icelandic javelin thrower

Personal information
- Nationality: Icelandic
- Born: 8 February 1963 (age 62) Borgarnes, Iceland

Sport
- Sport: Athletics
- Event: Javelin throw

Íris Grönfeldt (born 8 February 1963) is an Icelandic athlete. She competed in the women's javelin throw at the 1984 Summer Olympics and the 1988 Summer Olympics.

She won an NCAA javelin title competing for the Alabama Crimson Tide track and field program.
