= Tennessee Volunteers women's track and field =

- Founded: 1969
- University: University of Tennessee
- Athletic director: Danny White
- Head coach: Duane Ross (May 2022-present season)
- Conference: SEC
- Location: Knoxville, Tennessee, US
- Indoor track: Stokely Athletic Center (Until 2012) (Capacity: 12,700); New Indoor Track Facility (2023- )
- Outdoor track: Tom Black Track at LaPorte Stadium (Capacity: 7,500)
- Nickname: Lady Volunteers
- Colors: Orange, white, and smokey gray

NCAA Indoor National Championships
- 2005, 2009

NCAA Outdoor National Championships
- 1981*

NCAA Indoor Tournament Appearances
- 1981*, 1982*, 1983, 1984, 1985, 1986, 1987, 1988, 1989, 1990, 1991, 1992, 1994, 1995, 1998, 1999, 2001, 2002, 2003, 2004, 2005, 2006, 2007, 2008, 2009, 2010, 2011, 2012, 2015, 2016, 2018, 2019, 2021, 2022, 2023, 2024

NCAA Outdoor Tournament Appearances
- 1976*, 1977*, 1978*, 1979*, 1980*, 1981*, 1982, 1983, 1984, 1985, 1986, 1987, 1988, 1989, 1990, 1991, 1992, 1993, 1994, 1995, 1996, 1997, 1998, 1999, 2001, 2002, 2003, 2004, 2005, 2006, 2007, 2008, 2009, 2010, 2011, 2012, 2014, 2015, 2016, 2017, 2018, 2019, 2021, 2022, 2023; Asterisk = AIAW

Conference Indoor Championships
- 1984, 2005, 2007, 2009

Conference Outdoor Championships
- 1981, 1982, 1983, 1984

The Tennessee Volunteers women's track and field program represents the University of Tennessee in the sport of track and field. The indoor and outdoor programs compete in Division I of the National Collegiate Athletic Association (NCAA) and the Southeastern Conference (SEC). The Lady Vols host their home outdoor meets at the newly renovated Tom Black Track at LaPorte Stadium, located on the university's Knoxville, Tennessee campus. They formally held meets indoors at Stokely Athletic Center until the arenas demolition in 2012, but will soon have a new indoor track facility sometime in the 2020s. The team is led by current head coach Duane Ross who took over the program after the firing of Beth Alford-Sullivan in May 2022.

Along with all other UT women's sports teams, it used the nickname "Lady Volunteers" (or the short form "Lady Vols") until the 2015–16 school year, when the school dropped the "Lady" prefix from the nicknames of all women's teams except in basketball. In 2017 the university announced the return of the “Lady Volunteer” name.

Throughout the program's history, the Lady Vols have produced 23 NCAA Indoor Individual Champions, 14 NCAA Outdoor Individual Champions, won 8 conference titles, and 3 team national championships. While not as successful historically as the Tennessee men's program, the Lady Vols have appeared in 33 NCAA Indoor Championships (4th most in SEC) and 37 Outdoor Championships (3rd most in SEC). Additionally, the program has finished as national runner up 7 times in Indoor Track and 2 times in Outdoor Track, and produced 4 Olympic Medalists.

== Head coaches ==
#	Coach	Years	Seasons	National Championships		Conference Championships	
#	Coach	Years	Seasons	Indoor	Outdoor	Indoor	Outdoor
1	Terry Crawford	1974–1984	11	–	1	1	4
2	Gary Schwartz	1985–1988	4	–	–	–	–
3	Dorothy Doolittle	1989–1997	9	–	–	–	–
4	Myrtle Ferguson	1998–2002	5	–	–	–	–
6	J.J. Clark	2003–2014	12	2	–	3	–
7	Beth Alford-Sullivan	2015-2022	8	–	–	–	–
8	Duane Ross	2023-	0	–	–	–	–
Total				2	1	4	4

== Yearly Record ==
Season	Coach	NCAA		Conference	
Season	Coach	Indoor	Outdoor	Indoor	Outdoor
Independent (AIAW)
1976	Terry Crawford	–	4th (AIAW)	–	–
1977	Terry Crawford	–	4th (AIAW)	–	–
1978	Terry Crawford	–	13th (AIAW)	–	–
1979	Terry Crawford	–	3rd (AIAW)	–	–
1980	Terry Crawford	–	4th (AIAW)	–	–
Southeastern Conference
1981	Terry Crawford	2nd (AIAW)	1st (AIAW)	–	1st (197)
1982	Terry Crawford	2nd (AIAW)	2nd (126)	–	1st (214)
1983	Terry Crawford	2nd (44)	4th (87)	–	1st (223)
1984	Terry Crawford	2nd (48)	2nd (124)	1st (148.5)	1st (207)
1985	Gary Schwartz	6th (22)	7th (30)	3rd (94.5)	2nd (109)
1986	Gary Schwartz	2nd (26)	4th (36)	3rd (87.3)	3rd (87.5)
1987	Gary Schwartz	2nd (30)	4th (33)	4th (79)	4th (80)
1988	Gary Schwartz	10th (12)	21st (12)	3rd (79)	3rd (84)
1989	Dorothy Doolittle	T-32nd (2)	37th (6)	2nd (100)	3rd (91)
1990	Dorothy Doolittle	T-9th (14)	6th (28)	3rd (83)	3rd (106)
1991	Dorothy Doolittle	T-6th (24)	5th (33)	3rd (91)	3rd (84)
1992	Dorothy Doolittle	T-13th (12)	T-9th (21)	4th (69)	5th (75.5)
1993	Dorothy Doolittle	–	18th (25)	5th (54)	5th (81)
1994	Dorothy Doolittle	11th (17)	5th (30)	4th (73.3)	3rd (125)
1995	Dorothy Doolittle	18th (11)	9th (23)	4th (64)	3rd (125)
1996	Dorothy Doolittle	–	T-49th (3)	7th (83)	9th (106)
1997	Dorothy Doolittle	–	T-18th (14)	T-7th (33)	7th (64)
1998	Myrtle Ferguson	T-31st (7)	T-15th (15)	6th (69)	7th (5.5)
1999	Myrtle Ferguson	T-32nd (6)	T-20th (12)	5th (54)	6th (81)
2000	Myrtle Ferguson	–	–	8th (35)	6th (71.25)
2001	Myrtle Ferguson	T-58th (1)	T-60th (2)	10th (64)	9th (125)
2002	Myrtle Ferguson	T-42nd (3)	T-39th (6)	7th (21)	6th (52.25)
2003	J.J. Clark	T-23rd (8)	T-22nd (12)	9th (25)	7th (55)
2004	J.J. Clark	4th (43)	T-7th (24)	2nd (99.5)	6th (78.5)
2005	J.J. Clark	1st (46)	4th (40)	1st (135.5)	3rd (108.3)
2006	J.J. Clark	T-18th (13)	18th (15)	T-3rd (78.5)	5th (78)
2007	J.J. Clark	3rd (30)	T-27th (9)	1st (120)	4th (89)
2008	J.J. Clark	T-8th (19)	T-13th (21)	2nd (116)	4th (85)
2009	J.J. Clark	1st (42)	T-10th (21)	1st (42)	3rd (106)
2010	J.J. Clark	2nd (36)	T-26th (10)	4th (77)	7th (62)
2011	J.J. Clark	T-7th (24)	T-11th (20)	3rd (78)	5th (92)
2012	J.J. Clark	T-48th (3)	T-9th (21)	4th (68)	5th (97)
2013	J.J. Clark	–	–	8th (29)	9th (39.5)
2014	J.J. Clark	–	T-59th (1)	7th (35)	10th (28)
2015	Beth Alford-Sullivan	T-38th (5)	T-56th (3)	10th (22)	14th (15)
2016	Beth Alford-Sullivan	7th (30)	T-29th (8)	T-4th (77)	4th (62)
2017	Beth Alford-Sullivan	–	T-62nd (2)	12th (14.5)	T-11th (27)
2018	Beth Alford-Sullivan	T-40th (4)	T-25th (11)	11th (21)	4th (78)
2019	Beth Alford-Sullivan	T-21st (10)	T-66th (1)	8th (40)	9th (45.5)
2020	Beth Alford-Sullivan	–	–	T-8th (43)	–
2021	Beth Alford-Sullivan	T-40th (3)	T-46th (5)	9th (32)	9th (38)
2022	Beth Alford-Sullivan	16th (12)	T-62nd (1)	6th (50)	9th (34)
2023	Duane Ross	T-7th (24)	T-10th (19)	3rd (56.33)	5th (67)
2024	Duane Ross	T-17th (13)		8th (38)	
Total		2	1	4	4

Note: The 2020 season was canceled after the SEC Indoor Championships due to the Coronavirus Pandemic, the SEC Outdoor and both NCAA Championships were not held.

== NCAA Individual Event Champions ==
The Lady Vols have claimed 23 NCAA Indoor individual titles, 14 NCAA Outdoor individual crowns, 13 AIAW individual champions, and 3 DGWS wins.

Indoor
Year	Name	Event	Time/Mark
1981 (AIAW)	Delisa Walton	600m	1:26.56
1982 (AIAW)	Delisa Walton	600y	1:17.38
1982 (AIAW)	Benita Fitzgerald	60y Hurdles	7.54
1982 (AIAW)	Rose Hauch	Shot Put	55-0
1982 (AIAW)	Joetta Clark	1000y	2:26.70
1983	Delisa Walton	600y	1:20.21
1983	Joetta Clark	800y	2:06.02
1983	Barksdale, Clark, Rattray, Walton	Mile Relay	2:06.02
1984	Cathy Rattray	500m	1:10.82
1984	Joetta Clark	1000m	2:43.85
1984	Bolden, Rattray, Barksdale, Oliver	4x400 Meter Relay	3:37.04
1984	Davidson, Quelch, Harvey, Clark	4x800 Meter Relay	8:40.17
1986	Ilrey Oliver	500m	109.68
1986	McLaughlin, Benjamin, Martin, Oliver	4x400 Meter Relay	3:34.19
1987	LaVonna Martin	55m Hurdles	7.57
1988	LaVonna Martin	55m Hurdles	7.56
1991	Wiegand	3000m	9:09.83
1991	Johnson, Jones, Olkowski, Wiegand	4x800 Relay	8:36.32
2004	Nicole Cook	800m	2:03.27
2004	Novak, Trotter, Cook, Hyatt	Distance Medley Relay	11:06.07
2005	Tianna Madison	Long Jump	6.78m (22-3)
2008	Sheffey, Jones, Wright, Bowman	Distance Medley Relay	11:01.97
2009	Sarah Bowman	Mile	4:29.72
2009	Wright, Jones, Price, Bowman	Distance Medley Relay	10:50.98
2010	Phoebe Wright	800m	2:02.55
2010	Wright, Wortham, Price, Sheffey	Distance Medley Relay	10:58.37
2011	Jackie Areson	5000m	16:04.16
2016	Felicia Brown	200m	22.47

Outdoor
Year	Name	Event	Time/Mark
1969 (DGWS)	Terry Hull	220y	25.4
1969 (DGWS)	Terry Hull	440y	56.4
1970 (DGWS)	Terry Hull	880y	2:09.70
1977 (AIAW)	Brenda Webb	5000m	16:13.90
1977 (AIAW)	Jane Haist	Discus	188-5
1979 (AIAW)	Brenda Webb	1500m	4:17.06
1979 (AIAW)	Brenda Webb	3000m	9:15.80
1980 (AIAW)	Delisa Walton	800m	2:04.88
1981 (AIAW)	Benita Fitzgerald	100m Hurdles	13.12
1981 (AIAW)	Barksdale, Fitzgerald, Rattray, Walton	4x200m Medley Relay	1:36.70
1981 (AIAW)	Barksdale, Clark, Rattray, Walton	4x400m Relay	3:31.70
1982	Delisa Walton	800m	2:05.22
1982	Kathy Bryant	5000m	16:10.41
1982	Benita Fitzgerald	100m Hurdles	13.13
1982	Barksdale, Clark, Rattray, Walton	4x400m Relay	3:28.55
1983	Joetta Clark	800m	2:02.28
1983	Benita Fitzgerald	100m Hurdles	12.84
1984	Joetta Clark	800m	2:02.60
1986	Alisa Harvey	1500m	4:17.48
1986	Benjamin, Oliver, Martin, McLaughlin	4x400m Relay	3:29.35
1987	LaVonna Martin	100m Hurdles	13.05
1994	Dedra Davis	Long Jump	22-5.75
2004	DeeDee Trotter	400m	50.32
2005	Tianna Madison	Long Jump	21-10.25
2010	Pheobe Wright	800m	2:01.40

== Conference Individual Event Champions ==
Through the end of the 2022 season, the Lady Vols have won a total of 76 SEC Indoor individual championships, and 111 SEC Outdoor individual titles.

Indoor
Event	Titles
55-Meter Hurdles	2
60-Meter Hurdles	2
55 Meters	1
60 Meters	2
200 Meters	2
300 Yards	2
400 Meters	2
600 Yards	1
800 Meters	8
1000 Meters	4
1500 Meters	1
Mile	5
3000 Meters	10
5000 Meters	4
4x400-Meter Relay	6
4x800-Meter Relay	4
Distance Medley Relay	8
High Jump	2
Long Jump	1
Pole Vault	1
Shot Put	6
Weight Throw	1
Pentathlon	2

Outdoor
Event	Titles
100-Meter Hurdles	8
400-Meter Hurdles	6
100 Meters	6
200 Meters	5
400 Meters	6
800 Meters	11
1500 Meters	13
3000 Meters	3
5000 Meters	8
10000 Meters	2
4x100-Meter Relay	2
4x400-Meter Relay	5
4x800-Meter Relay	1
800-Meter Medley Relay	1
Long Jump	4
Pole Vault	3
Shot Put	8
Discus	9
Hammer Throw	2
Javelin	2
Heptathlon	6

== Tennessee Lady Volunteer Olympians ==
Through the 2020 Summer Olympics, 18 current and former Lady Vols have represented 8 different nations in the Olympic Games. They have brought home a total of 8 medals, including 6 gold, 1 silver, and 1 bronze medal.

=== Medalists ===
Athlete	Country	Olympics	Event	Medal
Benita Fitzgerald-Brown	United States	1984 Los Angeles	100 m hurdles	Gold
Tianna Madison	United States	2012 London	4x100 m relay	Gold
Tianna Madison	United States	2016 Rio	Long Jump	Gold
Tianna Madison	United States	2016 Rio	4x100 m relay	Gold
LaVonna Martin	United States	1992 Barcelona	100 m hurdles	Silver
DeeDee Trotter	United States	2004 Athens	4x400 m relay	Gold
DeeDee Trotter	United States	2012 London	4x400 m relay	Gold
DeeDee Trotter	United States	2012 London	400 m	Bronze

=== Participants ===
Athlete	Country	Olympics
Missy Alston	United States	1984 Los Angeles
Alice Annum	Ghana	1964 Tokyo
Alice Annum	Ghana	1968 Mexico City
Alice Annum	Ghana	1972 Munich
Sharrieffa Barksdale	United States	1984 Los Angeles
Joetta Clark-Diggs	United States	1992 Barcelona
Joetta Clark-Diggs	United States	1996 Atlanta
Joetta Clark-Diggs	United States	2000 Sydney
Dedra Davis	Bahamas	1992 Barcelona
Kali Davis-White	Jamaica	2016 Rio de Janeiro
Veronica Findlay	Jamaica	1984 Los Angeles
Jane Haist	Canada	1976 Montreal
Joella Lloyd	Antigua and Barbuda	2020 Tokyo
Ilrey Oliver	Jamaica	1984 Los Angeles
Stamatia Scarvelis	Greece	2020 Tokyo
Cathy Rattray-Williams	Jamaica	1980 Moscow
Cathy Rattray-Williams	Jamaica	1984 Los Angeles
Cathy Rattray-Williams	Jamaica	1988 Seoul
Cathy Rattray-Williams	Jamaica	1992 Barcelona
Patricia Walsh	Ireland	1984 Los Angeles
Erica Witter	Canada	2000 Sydney

== See also ==
- Tennessee men's track and field
- Tennessee women's cross country
- Tennessee men's cross country
