= Diane Francis (sprinter) =

Saint Kitts and Nevis sprinter (born 1968)

Personal information
- Nationality: Saint Kitts and Nevis
- Born: 31 August 1968 (age 57)

Sport
- Sport: Sprinting
- Event: 400 metres

Diane Gale Dunrod-Francis (born 31 August 1968) is a Saint Kitts and Nevis former sprinter. She competed in the women's 400 metres at the 1996 Summer Olympics. She was the first woman to represent Saint Kitts and Nevis at the Olympics.

Francis was an All-American sprinter for the Alabama Crimson Tide track and field team, finishing runner-up in the 400 m at the 1990 NCAA Division I Outdoor Track and Field Championships.
