= Trish Bartholomew =

Grenadian sprinter

Personal information
- Nationality: Grenada
- Born: 23 October 1986 (age 39) Saint Andrew Parish, Grenada
- Height: 1.60 m (5 ft 3 in)
- Weight: 59 kg (130 lb)

Sport
- Sport: Athletics
- Event: Sprint
- Team: Alabama Crimson Tide (USA)

Achievements and titles
- Personal best(s): 200 m: 23.12 s (2007); 400 m: 51.29 s (2008)

Trish Bartholomew (born 23 October 1986 in Saint Andrew Parish) is a Grenadian sprinter, who specialized in the 400 metres. She set a personal best time of 51.29 seconds, by finishing second at the 2008 NCAA Championships in Des Moines, Iowa.

Bartholomew represented Grenada at the 2008 Summer Olympics in Beijing, where she competed for the women's 400 metres. She ran in the sixth heat against seven other athletes, including Jamaica's Novlene Williams and Great Britain's Nicola Sanders, both of whom were heavy favorites in this event. She finished the race in fifth place by one hundredth of a second (0.01) behind Kineke Alexander of St. Vincent and the Grenadines, with a time of 52.88 seconds. Bartholomew, however, failed to advance into the semi-finals, as she placed thirty-third overall, and was ranked below three mandatory slots for the next round. She also tied her overall preliminary position with India's Mandeep Kaur.

She placed 16th in the 400m Athletics category at the 2010 Commonwealth Games.

Bartholomew is also a member of the track and field team for the Alabama Crimson Tide, and a graduate of psychology major at the University of Alabama in Tuscaloosa, Alabama.
