= Hilda Olemomoi =

Kenyan athlete (born 2003)

Personal information
- Born: 2 December 2003 (age 22)

Sport
- Sport: Athletics
- Events: Long distance running, Cross country running

Hilda Olemomoi (born 2 December 2003) is a Kenyan long-distance runner.

== Biography ==
Competing for the University of Alabama, she finished sixth at the 2022 NCAA Division I cross country championships in Stillwater, Oklahoma.

She was second in the 5000m at the 2023 NCAA Division I Indoor Track and Field Championships in Albuquerque, New Mexico. She finished fifth at the 2023 NCAA Division I Outdoor Track and Field Championships in Austin, Texas.

She finished third in the NCAA regional south cross country race behind teammate Doris Lemngole and runway leader Parker Valby. She then finished fourth at the 2023 NCAA Division I cross country championships in Charlottesville, Virginia.

In 2024, she finished third at the 2024 NCAA Division I Indoor Track and Field Championships over 5000 metres in Boston, Massachusetts. In May 2024, she won the 10,000 metres at the SEC Championships.

Later in the year, she was the NCAA outdoor runner-up in both the 5000m and 10,000m. With the latter performance her time of 31:51.89 moved her to ninth on the all-time collegiate list. She transferred to the University of Florida ahead of the 2024–25 season.

In November 2024 she was a member of the Florida Gators team which finished third at the Southeastern Conference Cross Country Championships. She finished third at the NCAA Cross Country Championship in Verona, Wisconsin.

On 22 November 2025, she placed third at the 2025 NCAA Cross Country Championships in Missouri. In February 2026, she placed second in the 3000 metres behind Doris Lemngole at the SEC Indoor Championships. She placed fourth in the 5000 m in 15:14.51 on 13 March at the 2026 NCAA Indoor Championships. The next day, she also had a top-ten finish over 3000 metres at the championships. In May, she set a facility record of 32:31.21 in the 10,000 metres at the East Regional at Lexington, Kentucky, surpassing the previous best set by Parker Valby in 2024.
