= 2005 NCAA Division I Indoor Track and Field Championships =

- Organisers: NCAA
- Edition: 41st (Men); 23rd (Women)
- Dates: March 11–12, 2005
- Host city: Fayetteville, Arkansas
- Venue: Randal Tyson Track Center
- Level: Division I

The 2005 NCAA Division I Indoor Track and Field Championships were contested to determine the individual and team national champions of men's and women's NCAA collegiate indoor track and field events in the United States after the 2004–05 season, the 41st annual meet for men and 23rd annual meet for women.

For the sixth consecutive year, the championships were held at the Randal Tyson Track Center at the University of Arkansas in Fayetteville, Arkansas.

Hosts Arkansas won the men's title, the Razorbacks' eighteenth and first since 2003.

Tennessee won the women's title, the Lady Volunteers' first.

== Qualification ==
All teams and athletes from Division I indoor track and field programs were eligible to compete for this year's individual and team titles.

== Team standings ==
- Note: Top 10 only
- Scoring: 6 points for a 1st-place finish in an event, 4 points for 2nd, 3 points for 3rd, 2 points for 4th, and 1 point for 5th
- (DC) = Defending Champions
- † = Participation vacated by NCAA Committee on Infractions

=== Men's title ===
- 54 teams scored at least one point

Rank	Team	Points
1st place, gold medalist(s)	Arkansas	56
2nd place, silver medalist(s)	Florida	46
3rd place, bronze medalist(s)	Wisconsin	43
4	Auburn	37
5	Indiana	30
6	Oregon	29
7	Nebraska	28
8	Florida State	26
9	Michigan	25
T10	Arizona	20
T10	Texas	20
20	LSU (DC)	11

=== Women's title ===
- 67 teams scored at least one point

Rank	Team	Points
1st place, gold medalist(s)	Tennessee	46
2nd place, silver medalist(s)	Florida	36
3rd place, bronze medalist(s)	Miami (FL)	32
4	Nebraska	29
5	South Carolina	28
T6	BYU	26
T6	LSU (DC)	26
8	Stanford	24
9	Texas	23
10	Auburn	20

== See also ==
- 2004 NCAA Division I Cross Country Championships
- 2005 NCAA Division I Outdoor Track and Field Championships
