= 1984 NCAA Indoor Track and Field Championships =

- Dates: March 9–10, 1984
- Host city: (New York (state)) Syracuse, New York
- Venue: Carrier Dome

The 1984 NCAA Indoor Track and Field Championships were contested March 9−10, 1984 at the Carrier Dome at Syracuse University in Syracuse, New York to determine the individual and team national champions of men's and women's NCAA collegiate indoor track and field events in the United States. These were the 20th annual men's championships and the 2nd annual women's championships.

On the men's side, Arkansas claimed the team title, the Razorbacks' first. This would ultimately be the first of twelve straight titles for Arkansas. For the women's title, Nebraska prevailed for the second straight year, the Cornhuskers' second title.

This was the first year the championship event was not held Michigan and the last combined event before the establishment of separate Division II and Division III titles in 1985.

== Qualification ==
Unlike other NCAA-sponsored sports, there were not separate Division I, Division II, and Division III championships for indoor track and field until 1985. As such, all athletes and teams from University and College Division programs were eligible to compete.

== Team standings ==
- Note: Top 10 only
- Scoring: 6 points for a 1st-place finish in an event, 4 points for 2nd, 3 points for 3rd, 2 points for 4th, and 1 point for 5th
- (DC) = Defending Champions
- Full results

=== Men's title ===
Rank	Team	Points
1st place, gold medalist(s)	Arkansas	38
2nd place, silver medalist(s)	Washington State	28
3rd place, bronze medalist(s)	SMU (DC)	27
4	Iowa State	26
5	Boston University	20
6	BYU	18
7	Oklahoma State; UTEP	15
9	Southern Illinois	14
10	New Mexico	16

=== Women's title ===
Rank	Team	Points
1st place, gold medalist(s)	Nebraska (DC)	59
2nd place, silver medalist(s)	Tennessee	48
3rd place, bronze medalist(s)	Villanova	30
4	Florida State	16
5	Kansas State	14
6	Wisconsin	13
7	Arizona; Maryland	12
9	Georgia; Rice	11
