= Mercy Chelangat =

Kenyan long-distance runner

Personal information
- Born: 11 July 1997 (age 29)

Sport
- Country: Kenya
- Sport: Long-distance running
- Event: Marathon

Achievements and titles
- Personal bests: 10,000 m: 31:15.39 (San Juan Capistrano 2024); Road; 10 km: 32:37 (Boston 2024); Half marathon: 1:08:57 (Houston 2025); Marathon: 2:23:33 (Ottawa 2025)

Mercy Chelangat (born 11 July 1997) is a Kenyan long-distance runner.

== Career ==
She attended college at the University of Alabama as a student athlete. In 2022 she was the NCAA Champion in the 10 km event after having placed 2nd the previous year in the same event. The following year in 2023 she signed with Hoka. She went on to place 3rd and 2nd respectively in the 2023 and 2024 Austin Cross Champs cross country competitions.

In 2025 she made her marathon debut at the Ottawa Marathon, winning the event with a time of 2:23:33. Her second marathon was the following year at the 2026 Boston Marathon where she placed 4th. She concluded her season running the 2026 New York City Marathon where she placed 5th with a time of 2:25:46.
