= Doris Lemngole =

Kenyan athlete (born 2002)

- Lemngole in 2026

Personal information
- Nationality: Kenyan
- Born: 5 February 2002 (age 24)
- Height: 5 ft 7 in (170 cm)

Sport
- Sport: Athletics
- Event: Long distance running

Achievements and titles
- Personal bests: Outdoor; 1500m: 4:09.28 (Tuscaloosa, 2025); 3000m Steeplechase: 8:52.86 (Brussels, 2026); Indoor; Mile: 4:32.69 (Clemson, 2026); 3000m: 8:31:39 (New York, 2026) CR; 5000m: 14:51.21 (Boston, 2026); Road; 5km 14:40 (Lille, 2023)
Medal record
Women's athletics
Representing Kenya
Diamond League Final
Second place	2026 Brussels	3000 m S’chase

Doris Lemngole (born 5 February 2002) is a Kenyan long-distance runner. In 2024, she won the NCAA titles in the 3000m steeplechase and cross country running. In 2025, she won the NCAA indoor title over 5000 metres and retained her NCAA titles over 3000 metres steeplechase and cross country, and won the Bowerman Award. She placed fifth in the steeplechase at the 2025 World Championships.

== Biography ==
Lemngole is from Kapenguria, Kenya and moved to the United States to compete in the collegiate system for the University of Alabama.

=== 2023-2024: First NCAA titles ===
On 19 March 2023 before being recruited for Alabama, she had already run 14:40 for a road 5K run at the Semi Marathon de Lille, faster than the U.S. collegiate record for the same distance on the track. In November 2023, she was runner up to Parker Valby at the NCAA Cross Country Championship in Charlottesville, Virginia.

In February 2024, she ran the second-fastest indoor collegiate time of all time in the women's 5000m, running 15:04.71 at the David Hemery Valentine Invitational. In June 2024 she won the NCAA 3000 metres steeplechase title in Eugene, Oregon.

In November 2024, she won the NCAA Cross Country title in Verona, Wisconsin finishing ahead of compatriot Pamela Kosgei.

=== 2025: World Championships debut, Bowerman Award ===
Lemngole won the NCAA Championship indoor title on 14 March 2025 in Virginia Beach over 5000 metres. At the SEC Championships in Kentucky in May 2025, she set a championship record in the steeplechase and won the 5000 metres. She then won the 2025 NCAA Outdoor Championships title in the 3000 metres steeplechase in Eugene, Oregon in June 2025, in a new collegiate record of 8:58.15.

In August 2025, she signed an NIL deal with Swiss sportswear brand On. That month, she recorded a debut victory in the Diamond League, winning in 9:16.36 in the 3000m steeplechase at the 2025 Athletissima event in Lausanne, in wet conditions. In September 2025, she was a finalist in the 3000 metres steeplechase at the 2025 World Championships in Tokyo, Japan, placing fifth.

On 22 November, she won the 2025 NCAA Cross Country Championships in Missouri. In December, Lemngole was awarded the 2025 Bowerman Award as the year's best student-athlete in American collegiate track and field.

=== 2026 ===
On 1 February, Lemngole ran a lifetime best to win the 3000m at the Millrose Games in New York, running 8:31.39 to finish ahead of British professional Hannah Nuttall, her time also setting an NCAA record for the distance. Later that month, she ran a 5000 metres personal best of 14:51.21 in Boston. Lemngole won the 3000 meters in 8:45.90, ahead of Hilda Olemomoi, at the 2026 SEC Indoor Championships. She placed second in 15:03.42 in the 5000 m behind Jane Hedengren on 13 March at the NCAA Indoor Championships.

In May, Lemngole won her third consecutive 3000 m steeplechase title at the SEC Outdoor Championships, running 9:18.66 to break the meet and facility record. Lemngole then won her second title of the weekend, with a win in the women's 5,000 meters in 15:30.69. Competing at the 2026 NCAA Outdoor Championships, Lemngole was first across the line in the 5000 metres but was later disqualified for stepping off the track, with the win awarded to second-place finisher Marion Jepngetich. On 4 July, she ran a personal best 8:57.89 in the 3000 m steeplechase at the Prefontaine Classic, the fastest time recorded for a fourth-place finish in a women's steeplechase. Competing in the Diamond League at the Athletissima in Lausanne, Switzerland on 21 August 2026, she placed fourth in the 3000 m steeplechase in 9:07.09. On 27 August, she ran a personal best 8:55.94 to finish runner-up to Faith Cherotich by 0.12 seconds at the Weltklasse Zürich. At the Diamond League Final in Brussels on 4 September, she placed second to Cherotich again in the 3000 metres steeplechase, running 8:52.86 for her third new personal best in four races.

== Competition record ==
Year	SEC Cross Country	NCAA South Regional Cross Country	NCAA Cross Country	SEC Indoor Track	NCAA Indoor Track	SEC Outdoor Track	NCAA Outdoor Track
2023–24	2nd	2nd	2nd	2nd - 3000m; 2nd - DMR	3rd - 3000m; 4th - 5000m	1st - 3000m SC; 2nd - 5000m	1st - 3000m SC
2024–25	1st	2nd	1st	1st - 3000m	2nd - 3000m; 1st - 5000m	1st - 5000m; 1st - 3000m SC	1st - 3000m SC
2025–26	1st	1st	1st				

== Honors and awards ==
- USTFCCCA Lance Harter Collegiate National Athlete of the Year: Cross Country 2024
