= Washington Huskies track and field =

College track and field team

- University: University of Washington
- Head coach: Maurica Powell (director); Andy Powell (head coach)
- Conference: Big Ten
- Location: Seattle, Washington
- Outdoor track: Husky Track
- Nickname: Huskies
- Colors: Purple and gold

The Washington Huskies track and field team is the track and field program that represents University of Washington. The Huskies compete in NCAA Division I as a member of the Big Ten Conference. The team is based in Seattle, Washington, at the Husky Track.

The program is coached by Maurica Powell (director) and Andy Powell (head coach). The track and field program officially encompasses four teams because the NCAA considers men's and women's indoor track and field and outdoor track and field as separate sports.

Scott Neilson won seven NCAA championship titles for the Huskies in the hammer throw and weight throw during the 1970s.

== Postseason ==
=== AIAW ===
The Huskies have had six AIAW individual All-Americans finishing in the top six at the AIAW indoor or outdoor championships.

AIAW All-Americans
Championships	Name	Event	Place
1970 Outdoor	Pam Brandis	Sprint medley relay	3rd
1970 Outdoor	Sue Schubert	Sprint medley relay	3rd
1970 Outdoor	Joyce Pearson	Sprint medley relay	3rd
1970 Outdoor	Nancy Richmond	Sprint medley relay	3rd
1971 Outdoor	Marion Service	440 yards	4th
1972 Outdoor	Alicia Jones	Long jump	6th
1974 Outdoor	Kathy Kuyk	2 miles	5th
1974 Outdoor	Jane Kearsley	4 × 440 yards relay	5th
1974 Outdoor	Laurie Wiegardt	4 × 440 yards relay	5th
1974 Outdoor	Kathy Kuyk	4 × 440 yards relay	5th
1974 Outdoor	Lisa Johnson	4 × 440 yards relay	5th
1976 Outdoor	Jane Kearsley	4 × 880 yards relay	4th
1976 Outdoor	Alice Kelly	4 × 880 yards relay	4th
1976 Outdoor	Kathy Kuyk	4 × 880 yards relay	4th
1976 Outdoor	Jenny Reed	4 × 880 yards relay	4th
1977 Outdoor	Maggie Garrison	High jump	3rd
1977 Outdoor	Caryl Van Pelt	Shot put	3rd
1978 Outdoor	Maggie Garrison	High jump	4th
1978 Outdoor	Caryl Van Pelt	Shot put	3rd
1980 Outdoor	Sandra Gregg	4 × 880 yards relay	3rd
1980 Outdoor	Anne Phillips	4 × 880 yards relay	3rd
1980 Outdoor	Susan Gregg	4 × 880 yards relay	3rd
1980 Outdoor	Dana Arnim	4 × 880 yards relay	3rd
1981 Outdoor	Sandra Gregg	1500 meters	5th
1981 Outdoor	Regina Joyce	3000 meters	1st
1981 Outdoor	Maggie Garrison	High jump	6th

=== NCAA ===
As of April 2025, a total of 156 men and 57 women have achieved individual first-team All-American status at the Division I men's outdoor, women's outdoor, men's indoor, or women's indoor national championships (using the modern criteria of top-8 placing regardless of athlete nationality).

First team NCAA All-Americans
Team	Championships	Name	Event	Place	Ref.
Men's	1921 Outdoor	Vic Hurley	100 meters	5th	
Men's	1921 Outdoor	James Pratt	400 meters	4th	
Men's	1921 Outdoor	Chuck Frankland	High jump	4th	
Men's	1921 Outdoor	Gus Pope	Shot put	1st	
Men's	1921 Outdoor	Gus Pope	Discus throw	1st	
Men's	1923 Outdoor	Earl Mason	Pole vault	4th	
Men's	1923 Outdoor	Cecil Callison	Long jump	6th	
Men's	1925 Outdoor	George Clarke	100 meters	6th	
Men's	1925 Outdoor	Jim Charteris	800 meters	1st	
Men's	1925 Outdoor	Drummond Wilde	Mile run	6th	
Men's	1925 Outdoor	William Maginnis	3000 meters	6th	
Men's	1925 Outdoor	Percy Egtvet	High jump	6th	
Men's	1926 Outdoor	George Clarke	100 meters	5th	
Men's	1926 Outdoor	Jim Charteris	800 meters	5th	
Men's	1926 Outdoor	Red Ramsay	3000 meters	6th	
Men's	1926 Outdoor	Herman Brix	Shot put	5th	
Men's	1927 Outdoor	William Shelley	220 yards hurdles	5th	
Men's	1927 Outdoor	Dean Anderson	100 meters	2nd	
Men's	1927 Outdoor	Ed Peitret	400 meters	6th	
Men's	1927 Outdoor	Jim Charteris	800 meters	2nd	
Men's	1927 Outdoor	Herman Brix	Shot put	1st	
Men's	1928 Outdoor	Steve Anderson	220 yards hurdles	2nd	
Men's	1928 Outdoor	Rufus Kiser	Mile run	1st	
Men's	1928 Outdoor	Tom Humes	Long jump	5th	
Men's	1928 Outdoor	Herman Brix	Shot put	3rd	
Men's	1928 Outdoor	Steve Anderson	220 yards hurdles	1st	
Men's	1929 Outdoor	Steve Anderson	110 meters hurdles	3rd	
Men's	1929 Outdoor	Eddie Genung	800 meters	1st	
Men's	1929 Outdoor	Gordon Dodds	800 meters	5th	
Men's	1929 Outdoor	Rufus Kiser	Mile run	3rd	
Men's	1929 Outdoor	Paul Jessup	Shot put	4th	
Men's	1929 Outdoor	Paul Jessup	Discus throw	4th	
Men's	1930 Outdoor	Steve Anderson	220 yards hurdles	3rd	
Men's	1930 Outdoor	Steve Anderson	110 meters hurdles	1st	
Men's	1930 Outdoor	Tom Hartley	400 meters	5th	
Men's	1930 Outdoor	Rufus Kiser	Mile run	2nd	
Men's	1930 Outdoor	Paul Jessup	Shot put	4th	
Men's	1930 Outdoor	Paul Jessup	Discus throw	1st	
Men's	1931 Outdoor	Tom Hartley	400 meters	5th	
Men's	1931 Outdoor	Eddie Genung	800 meters	3rd	
Men's	1933 Outdoor	Dan Bracken	110 meters hurdles	6th	
Men's	1934 Outdoor	Harry Pruzan	220 yards hurdles	7th	
Men's	1935 Outdoor	Vic Palmason	800 meters	5th	
Men's	1935 Outdoor	James Angle	Mile run	5th	
Men's	1937 Outdoor	Vic Palmason	800 meters	4th	
Men's	1940 Outdoor	Jim McGoldrick	110 meters hurdles	5th	
Men's	1941 Outdoor	Kjell Qvale	200 meters	6th	
Men's	1942 Outdoor	Bob Smith	400 meters	5th	
Men's	1943 Outdoor	Bob Smith	200 meters	5th	
Men's	1943 Outdoor	Gene Swanzey	800 meters	6th	
Men's	1943 Outdoor	Thomas Kamm	Long jump	3rd	
Men's	1943 Outdoor	Dick Yantis	Discus throw	4th	
Men's	1943 Outdoor	William Kydd	Javelin throw	4th	
Men's	1946 Outdoor	Don Wold	Mile run	2nd	
Men's	1947 Outdoor	Lyle Clark	110 meters hurdles	6th	
Men's	1947 Outdoor	Jack Hensey	800 meters	5th	
Men's	1947 Outdoor	Bill Steed	3000 meters	5th	
Men's	1950 Outdoor	Jack Burke	110 meters hurdles	7th	
Men's	1951 Outdoor	George Widenfeldt	High jump	2nd	
Men's	1953 Outdoor	Denny Meyer	3000 meters	6th	
Men's	1953 Outdoor	Darold Skartvedt	Long jump	4th	
Men's	1955 Outdoor	Gary Gayton	800 meters	8th	
Men's	1955 Outdoor	Jim Hilton	Pole vault	8th	
Men's	1959 Outdoor	Terry Tobacco	400 meters	3rd	
Men's	1959 Outdoor	Jack Larson	Mile run	8th	
Men's	1959 Outdoor	Clif Labounty	Pole vault	6th	
Men's	1959 Outdoor	Darrell Morton	Javelin throw	7th	
Men's	1959 Outdoor	John Douglas	Javelin throw	8th	
Men's	1961 Outdoor	John Cramer	Pole vault	4th	
Men's	1962 Outdoor	John Cramer	Pole vault	5th	
Men's	1963 Outdoor	Brian Sternberg	Pole vault	1st	
Men's	1963 Outdoor	John Cramer	Pole vault	3rd	
Men's	1963 Outdoor	Phil Shinnick	Long jump	6th	
Men's	1964 Outdoor	Phil Shinnick	Long jump	3rd	
Men's	1964 Outdoor	Wariboko West	Long jump	5th	
Men's	1965 Indoor	Phil Shinnick	Long jump	3rd	
Men's	1965 Outdoor	Bill Roe	110 meters hurdles	5th	
Men's	1965 Outdoor	Dave Williams	110 meters hurdles	7th	
Men's	1965 Outdoor	Dave Williams	Long jump	6th	
Men's	1966 Outdoor	Dave Williams	110 meters hurdles	6th	
Men's	1966 Outdoor	Dave Williams	400 meters hurdles	4th	
Men's	1966 Outdoor	Dave Roberts	Mile run	6th	
Men's	1967 Indoor	John Clems	3000 meters	5th	
Men's	1967 Outdoor	Dave Roberts	Mile run	6th	
Men's	1967 Outdoor	Dave DuPree	4 × 100 meters relay	5th	
Men's	1967 Outdoor	Tom Temple	4 × 100 meters relay	5th	
Men's	1967 Outdoor	Marty Walsh	4 × 100 meters relay	5th	
Men's	1967 Outdoor	Dave Williams	4 × 100 meters relay	5th	
Men's	1967 Outdoor	Fred Luke	Javelin throw	6th	
Men's	1968 Outdoor	John Celms	3000 meters steeplechase	5th	
Men's	1968 Outdoor	Eric Klein	Triple jump	4th	
Men's	1968 Outdoor	Carl Hubbell	Shot put	3rd	
Men's	1968 Outdoor	Don Fate	Javelin throw	8th	
Men's	1969 Outdoor	Bill Smart	Mile run	6th	
Men's	1969 Outdoor	John Hubbell	Shot put	5th	
Men's	1970 Indoor	Jim Johnson	Mile run	3rd	
Men's	1970 Outdoor	Jim Seymour	400 meters hurdles	6th	
Men's	1970 Outdoor	Bill Smart	Mile run	5th	
Men's	1970 Outdoor	Cary Feldmann	Javelin throw	3rd	
Men's	1971 Indoor	Jim Johnson	Mile run	2nd	
Men's	1971 Outdoor	Jim Seymour	400 meters hurdles	4th	
Men's	1971 Outdoor	Cary Feldmann	Javelin throw	1st	
Men's	1972 Indoor	Jim Johnson	Mile run	3rd	
Men's	1972 Outdoor	Jim Johnson	3000 meters steeplechase	2nd	
Men's	1972 Outdoor	Bill Koss	3000 meters steeplechase	7th	
Men's	1972 Outdoor	Kirk Bryde	Pole vault	5th	
Men's	1972 Outdoor	Gary Quitslund	Javelin throw	2nd	
Men's	1973 Indoor	Jeff Taylor	Pole vault	2nd	
Men's	1973 Outdoor	Gary Dankworth	Pole vault	7th	
Men's	1974 Indoor	Greg Gibson	1000 meters	3rd	
Men's	1974 Outdoor	Jeff Taylor	Pole vault	2nd	
Men's	1974 Outdoor	Borys Chambul	Discus throw	6th	
Men's	1974 Outdoor	Casey Ballwey	Hammer throw	6th	
Men's	1974 Outdoor	Rod Ewaliko	Javelin throw	2nd	
Men's	1975 Indoor	Joshua Kimeto	3000 meters	2nd	
Men's	1975 Outdoor	Billy Hicks	400 meters	6th	
Men's	1975 Outdoor	Keith Tinner	4 × 400 meters relay	1st	
Men's	1975 Outdoor	Jerry Belur	4 × 400 meters relay	1st	
Men's	1975 Outdoor	Pablo Franco	4 × 400 meters relay	1st	
Men's	1975 Outdoor	Billy Hicks	4 × 400 meters relay	1st	
Men's	1975 Outdoor	Rod Ewaliko	Javelin throw	3rd	
Men's	1976 Indoor	Joshua Kimeto	3000 meters	4th	
Men's	1976 Outdoor	Russ Vincent	Shot put	4th	
Men's	1976 Outdoor	Borys Chambul	Discus throw	1st	
Men's	1976 Outdoor	Scott Neilson	Hammer throw	1st	
Men's	1976 Outdoor	Rod Ewaliko	Javelin throw	4th	
Men's	1976 Outdoor	Duncan Atwood	Javelin throw	7th	
Men's	1977 Indoor	Robert Gaines	55 meters hurdles	5th	
Men's	1977 Indoor	Joshua Kimeto	3000 meters	3rd	
Men's	1977 Indoor	Scott Neilson	Weight throw	1st	
Men's	1977 Outdoor	Robert Gaines	110 meters hurdles	6th	
Men's	1977 Outdoor	Scott Neilson	Hammer throw	1st	
Men's	1977 Outdoor	Brian Mondschein	Decathlon	7th	
Men's	1978 Indoor	Russ Vincent	Shot put	4th	
Men's	1978 Indoor	Scott Neilson	Weight throw	1st	
Men's	1978 Outdoor	Steve Oravetz	Pole vault	6th	
Men's	1978 Outdoor	Steve Summers	Shot put	7th	
Men's	1978 Outdoor	Scott Neilson	Hammer throw	1st	
Men's	1978 Outdoor	Duncan Atwood	Javelin throw	3rd	
Men's	1978 Outdoor	Tom Sinclair	Javelin throw	4th	
Men's	1979 Indoor	Scott Neilson	Weight throw	1st	
Men's	1979 Outdoor	Steve Summers	Shot put	3rd	
Men's	1979 Outdoor	Scott Neilson	Hammer throw	1st	
Men's	1979 Outdoor	Tom Sinclair	Javelin throw	1st	
Men's	1979 Outdoor	Mike Mahovlich	Javelin throw	7th	
Men's	1979 Outdoor	Gary Gefre	Decathlon	8th	
Men's	1980 Indoor	Steve Orvetz	Pole vault	5th	
Men's	1980 Indoor	Steve Summers	Shot put	3rd	
Men's	1980 Outdoor	Mike Moulder	Javelin throw	3rd	
Men's	1980 Outdoor	Gary Gefre	Decathlon	6th	
Men's	1981 Outdoor	LaNoris Marshall	200 meters	3rd	
Men's	1981 Outdoor	Bernard Jackson	200 meters	7th	
Men's	1981 Outdoor	Steve Erickson	Decathlon	7th	
Men's	1982 Outdoor	Doug Wollen	Discus throw	8th	
Men's	1982 Outdoor	Mike Ramos	Decathlon	3rd	
Women's	1982 Outdoor	Deanna Carr	Javelin throw	7th	
Men's	1983 Outdoor	Dennis Brown	4 × 100 meters relay	2nd	
Men's	1983 Outdoor	Sterling Hinds	4 × 100 meters relay	2nd	
Men's	1983 Outdoor	Byron Howell	4 × 100 meters relay	2nd	
Men's	1983 Outdoor	LaNoris Marshall	4 × 100 meters relay	2nd	
Men's	1983 Outdoor	Bob Rockett	Javelin throw	7th	
Men's	1983 Outdoor	Mike Ramos	Decathlon	3rd	
Women's	1983 Outdoor	Donna Dennis	100 meters	8th	
Women's	1983 Outdoor	Regina Joyce	10,000 meters	5th	
Women's	1983 Outdoor	Deanna Carr	Javelin throw	5th	
Women's	1984 Indoor	Meledy Smith	Long jump	4th	
Men's	1984 Outdoor	Bob Rockett	Javelin throw	3rd	
Women's	1984 Outdoor	Meledy Smith	Long jump	3rd	
Men's	1985 Outdoor	Byron Howell	200 meters	6th	
Men's	1985 Outdoor	Bob Rockett	Javelin throw	2nd	
Men's	1985 Outdoor	Steve Erickson	Decathlon	4th	
Men's	1986 Indoor	Rick Noji	High jump	6th	
Men's	1986 Indoor	Neal Kneip	Weight throw	5th	
Men's	1986 Outdoor	Curt Corvin	10,000 meters	8th	
Men's	1986 Outdoor	Mike Ramos	Decathlon	1st	
Women's	1986 Outdoor	Vicki Borsheim	High jump	7th	
Women's	1986 Outdoor	Helena Uusitalo	Javelin throw	1st	
Men's	1987 Indoor	Rick Noji	High jump	2nd	
Men's	1987 Outdoor	Bruce Stirling	1500 meters	8th	
Men's	1987 Outdoor	Dan Bell	3000 meters steeplechase	3rd	
Men's	1987 Outdoor	Rick Noji	High jump	6th	
Men's	1987 Outdoor	Dan Tabish	Discus throw	7th	
Women's	1987 Outdoor	Helena Uusitalo	Javelin throw	2nd	
Men's	1988 Indoor	Rick Noji	High jump	4th	
Women's	1988 Indoor	Vicki Borsheim	High jump	2nd	
Women's	1988 Indoor	Jennifer Ponath	Shot put	3rd	
Women's	1988 Indoor	Shirley Ross	Shot put	7th	
Men's	1988 Outdoor	Darryl Roberson	Javelin throw	5th	
Women's	1988 Outdoor	Jennifer Ponath	Shot put	1st	
Women's	1988 Outdoor	Shirley Ross	Shot put	2nd	
Women's	1988 Outdoor	Meg Jones	Shot put	5th	
Women's	1988 Outdoor	Jennifer Ponath	Discus throw	7th	
Women's	1988 Outdoor	Shelly Sanford	Javelin throw	7th	
Men's	1989 Outdoor	Darryl Roberson	Javelin throw	5th	
Men's	1990 Indoor	Rick Noji	High jump	5th	
Men's	1990 Outdoor	Beno Bryant	4 × 400 meters relay	5th	
Men's	1990 Outdoor	Orlando McKay	4 × 400 meters relay	5th	
Men's	1990 Outdoor	Brent Merrit	4 × 400 meters relay	5th	
Men's	1990 Outdoor	Aaron Ellison	4 × 400 meters relay	5th	
Men's	1990 Outdoor	Rick Noji	High jump	3rd	
Men's	1991 Indoor	Dana Hall	55 meters hurdles	4th	
Men's	1991 Outdoor	Todd Wilson	Discus throw	5th	
Women's	1991 Outdoor	Mari Bjone	400 meters hurdles	7th	
Men's	1993 Outdoor	Greg Metcalf	3000 meters steeplechase	6th	
Men's	1993 Outdoor	Adam Setliff	Discus throw	5th	
Women's	1993 Outdoor	Monika Parker	Javelin throw	7th	
Women's	1994 Indoor	Claudine Robinson	55 meters hurdles	4th	
Men's	1994 Outdoor	Pete Kaligis	Shot put	7th	
Women's	1994 Outdoor	Laura Kruse	Javelin throw	8th	
Men's	1995 Outdoor	Ernie Conwell	Shot put	5th	
Women's	1995 Outdoor	Terra Barter	400 meters hurdles	8th	
Women's	1995 Outdoor	Aretha Hill	Discus throw	7th	
Men's	1996 Outdoor	Bryan Madche	Pole vault	6th	
Men's	1996 Outdoor	Ernie Conwell	Shot put	5th	
Men's	1996 Outdoor	Troy Burkholder	Javelin throw	4th	
Women's	1996 Outdoor	Tara Carlson	5000 meters	8th	
Women's	1996 Outdoor	Aretha Hill	Discus throw	3rd	
Men's	1997 Indoor	Ed Turner	200 meters	5th	
Women's	1997 Outdoor	Aretha Hill	Discus throw	4th	
Men's	1998 Indoor	Ja'Warren Hooker	55 meters	1st	
Men's	1998 Indoor	Ja'Warren Hooker	200 meters	8th	
Men's	1998 Indoor	Scott Anabel	4 × 400 meters relay	8th	
Men's	1998 Indoor	B.J. Dawson	4 × 400 meters relay	8th	
Men's	1998 Indoor	Derek Prior	4 × 400 meters relay	8th	
Men's	1998 Indoor	Ja'Warren Hooker	4 × 400 meters relay	8th	
Men's	1998 Indoor	Ben Lindsey	Shot put	5th	
Men's	1998 Outdoor	Ja'Warren Hooker	100 meters	3rd	
Men's	1998 Outdoor	Ben Lindsey	Discus throw	5th	
Women's	1998 Outdoor	Aretha Hill	Discus throw	2nd	
Men's	2000 Indoor	Ja'Warren Hooker	60 meters	6th	
Men's	2000 Indoor	Ja'Warren Hooker	200 meters	6th	
Men's	2000 Outdoor	Ja'Warren Hooker	200 meters	6th	
Men's	2000 Outdoor	Matt Phillips	Pole vault	8th	
Men's	2000 Outdoor	Justin St. Clair	Javelin throw	6th	
Men's	2000 Outdoor	Jacob Predmore	Decathlon	7th	
Women's	2000 Outdoor	Sesilia Thomas	Shot put	8th	
Men's	2001 Indoor	Ja'Warren Hooker	60 meters	3rd	
Men's	2001 Indoor	Ja'Warren Hooker	200 meters	2nd	
Men's	2001 Indoor	Brad Walker	Pole vault	7th	
Men's	2001 Outdoor	Ja'Warren Hooker	200 meters	5th	
Men's	2001 Outdoor	Dave Bazzi	5000 meters	8th	
Men's	2001 Outdoor	Dave Bazzi	10,000 meters	8th	
Men's	2002 Outdoor	Brad Walker	Pole vault	2nd	
Men's	2003 Indoor	Brad Walker	Pole vault	1st	
Women's	2003 Outdoor	Courtney Inman	1500 meters	4th	
Women's	2003 Outdoor	Kate Soma	Pole vault	7th	
Women's	2003 Outdoor	Heather Reichman	Javelin throw	7th	
Men's	2004 Indoor	Eric Garner	Mile run	8th	
Men's	2004 Indoor	Brad Walker	Pole vault	1st	
Women's	2004 Indoor	Kate Soma	Pole vault	5th	
Women's	2004 Outdoor	Kate Soma	Pole vault	2nd	
Women's	2004 Outdoor	Megan Spriestersbach	Javelin throw	4th	
Men's	2005 Indoor	Austin Abbott	Distance medley relay	5th	
Men's	2005 Indoor	Sean Williams	Distance medley relay	5th	
Men's	2005 Indoor	Ryan Brown	Distance medley relay	5th	
Men's	2005 Indoor	Andy Fader	Distance medley relay	5th	
Men's	2005 Indoor	Norris Frederick	Long jump	6th	
Women's	2005 Indoor	Lindsey Egerdahl	Mile run	8th	
Women's	2005 Indoor	Kate Soma	Pole vault	2nd	
Women's	2005 Indoor	Ashley Wildhaber	Pole vault	5th	
Women's	2005 Outdoor	Ashley Lodree	100 meters hurdles	5th	
Women's	2005 Outdoor	Kate Soma	Pole vault	1st	
Women's	2005 Outdoor	Carly Dockendorf	Pole vault	6th	
Men's	2006 Indoor	Jordan Boase	4 × 400 meters relay	3rd	
Men's	2006 Indoor	Ryan Brown	4 × 400 meters relay	3rd	
Men's	2006 Indoor	Shane Charles	4 × 400 meters relay	3rd	
Men's	2006 Indoor	Bruce Jackson	4 × 400 meters relay	3rd	
Men's	2006 Indoor	Carl Moe	Distance medley relay	5th	
Men's	2006 Indoor	Bruce Jackson	Distance medley relay	5th	
Men's	2006 Indoor	Ryan Brown	Distance medley relay	5th	
Men's	2006 Indoor	Austin Abbott	Distance medley relay	5th	
Men's	2006 Outdoor	Ryan Brown	800 meters	1st	
Men's	2006 Outdoor	Jordan Boase	4 × 400 meters relay	8th	
Men's	2006 Outdoor	Shane Charles	4 × 400 meters relay	8th	
Men's	2006 Outdoor	Ryan Brown	4 × 400 meters relay	8th	
Men's	2006 Outdoor	Bruce Jackson	4 × 400 meters relay	8th	
Women's	2006 Outdoor	Ashley Lodree	100 meters hurdles	7th	
Women's	2006 Outdoor	Amy Lia	1500 meters	1st	
Men's	2007 Indoor	Ryan Brown	800 meters	1st	
Men's	2007 Indoor	Austin Abbott	800 meters	4th	
Men's	2007 Indoor	Austin Abbott	Distance medley relay	5th	
Men's	2007 Indoor	James Fredrickson	Distance medley relay	5th	
Men's	2007 Indoor	Ryan Brown	Distance medley relay	5th	
Men's	2007 Indoor	Carl Moe	Distance medley relay	5th	
Men's	2007 Indoor	Norris Frederick	Long jump	6th	
Women's	2007 Indoor	Ashley Lodree	60 meters hurdles	3rd	
Men's	2007 Outdoor	Ryan Brown	800 meters	3rd	
Men's	2007 Outdoor	Scott Roth	Pole vault	8th	
Men's	2007 Outdoor	Norris Frederick	Long jump	3rd	
Men's	2007 Outdoor	Martin Bingisser	Hammer throw	6th	
Women's	2007 Outdoor	Ashley Lodree	100 meters hurdles	6th	
Men's	2008 Indoor	Jordan Boase	400 meters	3rd	
Men's	2008 Indoor	Norris Frederick	High jump	6th	
Men's	2008 Indoor	Norris Frederick	Long jump	2nd	
Women's	2008 Indoor	Amanda Miller	Mile run	5th	
Women's	2008 Indoor	Katie Mackey	Mile run	6th	
Women's	2008 Indoor	Kelley Divesta	Pole vault	7th	
Men's	2008 Outdoor	Jordan Boase	400 meters	4th	
Men's	2008 Outdoor	Austin Abbott	800 meters	7th	
Men's	2008 Outdoor	Carl Moe	3000 meters steeplechase	8th	
Men's	2008 Outdoor	Norris Frederick	High jump	7th	
Men's	2008 Outdoor	Jared O'Connor	Pole vault	2nd	
Men's	2008 Outdoor	Norris Frederick	Long jump	6th	
Men's	2009 Indoor	Jordan Boase	400 meters	3rd	
Women's	2009 Indoor	Katie Mackey	3000 meters	5th	
Women's	2009 Indoor	Christine Babcock	Distance medley relay	8th	
Women's	2009 Indoor	Falesha Ankton	Distance medley relay	8th	
Women's	2009 Indoor	Kailey Campbell	Distance medley relay	8th	
Women's	2009 Indoor	Katie Follett	Distance medley relay	8th	
Women's	2009 Indoor	Elisa Bryant	Weight throw	8th	
Men's	2009 Outdoor	Austin Abbott	1500 meters	7th	
Men's	2009 Outdoor	Scott Roth	Pole vault	2nd	
Men's	2009 Outdoor	Kyle Nielsen	Javelin throw	6th	
Women's	2009 Outdoor	Mel Lawrence	3000 meters steeplechase	3rd	
Women's	2009 Outdoor	Anita Campbell	10,000 meters	3rd	
Women's	2009 Outdoor	Brooke Pighin	Javelin throw	7th	
Men's	2010 Indoor	Scott Roth	Pole vault	1st	
Women's	2010 Indoor	Katie Mackey	Mile run	2nd	
Men's	2010 Outdoor	Scott Roth	Pole vault	3rd	
Men's	2010 Outdoor	Kyle Nielsen	Javelin throw	3rd	
Men's	2010 Outdoor	Joe Zimmerman	Javelin throw	4th	
Women's	2010 Outdoor	Mel Lawrence	3000 meters steeplechase	8th	
Men's	2011 Indoor	James Cameron	Mile run	8th	
Men's	2011 Indoor	Scott Roth	Pole vault	1st	
Men's	2011 Indoor	Jeremy Taiwo	Heptathlon	8th	
Men's	2011 Outdoor	Scott Roth	Pole vault	1st	
Men's	2011 Outdoor	Kyle Nielsen	Javelin throw	8th	
Women's	2011 Outdoor	Megan Goethals	5000 meters	6th	
Women's	2012 Indoor	Chelsea Orr	Distance medley relay	1st	
Women's	2012 Indoor	Jordan Carlson	Distance medley relay	1st	
Women's	2012 Indoor	Baylee Mires	Distance medley relay	1st	
Women's	2012 Indoor	Katie Flood	Distance medley relay	1st	
Women's	2012 Outdoor	Katie Flood	1500 meters	1st	
Women's	2012 Outdoor	Megan Goethals	5000 meters	2nd	
Women's	2012 Outdoor	Logan Miller	Pole vault	4th	
Men's	2013 Outdoor	Jeremy Taiwo	Decathlon	2nd	
Women's	2013 Outdoor	Megan Goethals	5000 meters	5th	
Women's	2013 Outdoor	Megan Goethals	10,000 meters	4th	
Men's	2014 Indoor	Quadelle Satterwhite	Distance medley relay	8th	
Men's	2014 Indoor	Derrick Daigre	Distance medley relay	8th	
Men's	2014 Indoor	Meron Simon	Distance medley relay	8th	
Men's	2014 Indoor	Nick Harris	Distance medley relay	8th	
Men's	2014 Indoor	Jax Thoirs	Pole vault	8th	
Men's	2014 Outdoor	Derrick Daigre	800 meters	8th	
Men's	2014 Outdoor	Quinn Hale	Javelin throw	5th	
Men's	2015 Indoor	Jax Thoirs	Pole vault	4th	
Women's	2015 Indoor	Baylee Mires	Distance medley relay	5th	
Women's	2015 Indoor	Gianna Woodruff	Distance medley relay	5th	
Women's	2015 Indoor	Eleanor Fulton	Distance medley relay	5th	
Women's	2015 Indoor	Maddie Meyers	Distance medley relay	5th	
Women's	2015 Indoor	Diamara Planell Cruz	Pole vault	4th	
Women's	2015 Outdoor	Kristina Owsinski	Pole vault	4th	
Men's	2016 Indoor	Izaic Yorks	3000 meters	4th	
Men's	2016 Indoor	Colby Gilbert	3000 meters	8th	
Men's	2016 Indoor	Colby Gilbert	Distance medley relay	2nd	
Men's	2016 Indoor	Jacopo Spano	Distance medley relay	2nd	
Men's	2016 Indoor	Blake Nelson	Distance medley relay	2nd	
Men's	2016 Indoor	Izaic Yorks	Distance medley relay	2nd	
Men's	2016 Indoor	Jax Thoirs	Pole vault	1st	
Women's	2016 Indoor	Kennadi Bouyer	60 meters	8th	
Women's	2016 Indoor	Eleanor Fulton	Mile run	8th	
Women's	2016 Indoor	Baylee Mires	Distance medley relay	2nd	
Women's	2016 Indoor	Krista Armstead	Distance medley relay	2nd	
Women's	2016 Indoor	Eleanor Fulton	Distance medley relay	2nd	
Women's	2016 Indoor	Maddie Meyers	Distance medley relay	2nd	
Women's	2016 Indoor	Diamara Planell Cruz	Pole vault	3rd	
Men's	2016 Outdoor	Izaic Yorks	1500 meters	2nd	
Men's	2016 Outdoor	Jax Thoirs	Pole vault	5th	
Women's	2016 Outdoor	Baylee Mires	800 meters	8th	
Men's	2017 Indoor	Colby Gilbert	3000 meters	5th	
Women's	2017 Indoor	Elizabeth Quick	Pole vault	7th	
Women's	2017 Outdoor	Amy-Eloise Markovc	1500 meters	8th	
Women's	2017 Outdoor	Kristina Owsinski	Pole vault	5th	
Men's	2018 Indoor	Colby Gilbert	3000 meters	7th	
Men's	2018 Outdoor	Andrew Gardner	3000 meters steeplechase	5th	
Women's	2018 Outdoor	Amy-Eloise Markovc	5000 meters	5th	
Women's	2019 Indoor	Katie Rainsberger	Mile run	7th	
Women's	2019 Indoor	Allie Schadler	Distance medley relay	7th	
Women's	2019 Indoor	Imani Apostol	Distance medley relay	7th	
Women's	2019 Indoor	Hannah Derby	Distance medley relay	7th	
Women's	2019 Indoor	Lilli Burdon	Distance medley relay	7th	
Men's	2019 Outdoor	Elijah Mason	Discus throw	7th	
Men's	2019 Outdoor	Denham Patricelli	Javelin throw	8th	
Women's	2019 Outdoor	Darhian Mills	400 meters hurdles	7th	
Women's	2019 Outdoor	Isobel Batt-Doyle	10,000 meters	3rd	
Women's	2019 Outdoor	Olivia Gruver	Pole vault	3rd	
Women's	2021 Indoor	Katie Rainsberger	Mile run	8th	
Men's	2021 Outdoor	Jonah Wilson	Shot put	8th	
Men's	2021 Outdoor	Elijah Mason	Discus throw	6th	
Women's	2021 Outdoor	Katie Rainsberger	3000 meters steeplechase	3rd	
Women's	2021 Outdoor	Haley Herberg	10,000 meters	5th	
Women's	2021 Outdoor	Ida Eikeng	Heptathlon	5th	
Men's	2022 Indoor	Brian Fay	5000 meters	6th	
Men's	2022 Indoor	Joe Waskom	Distance medley relay	7th	
Men's	2022 Indoor	Anthony Smith	Distance medley relay	7th	
Men's	2022 Indoor	Cass Elliott	Distance medley relay	7th	
Men's	2022 Indoor	Luke Houser	Distance medley relay	7th	
Men's	2022 Indoor	Jayden White	Weight throw	4th	
Men's	2022 Outdoor	Joe Waskom	1500 meters	1st	
Men's	2022 Outdoor	Luke Houser	1500 meters	5th	
Men's	2022 Outdoor	Nathan Green	1500 meters	7th	
Men's	2022 Outdoor	Brian Fay	5000 meters	7th	
Men's	2022 Outdoor	Elijah Mason	Discus throw	7th	
Women's	2022 Outdoor	Haley Herberg	10,000 meters	7th	
Women's	2022 Outdoor	Ida Eikeng	Heptathlon	2nd	
Men's	2023 Indoor	Luke Houser	Mile run	1st	
Men's	2023 Indoor	Joe Waskom	Mile run	4th	
Men's	2023 Indoor	Nathan Green	Mile run	5th	
Men's	2023 Indoor	Brian Fay	Mile run	8th	
Men's	2023 Indoor	Kieran Lumb	3000 meters	8th	
Men's	2023 Indoor	Joe Waskom	Distance medley relay	4th	
Men's	2023 Indoor	Daniel Gaik	Distance medley relay	4th	
Men's	2023 Indoor	Nathan Green	Distance medley relay	4th	
Men's	2023 Indoor	Kieran Lumb	Distance medley relay	4th	
Men's	2023 Indoor	Jayden White	Weight throw	5th	
Men's	2023 Indoor	Bruno Comín Pescador	Heptathlon	8th	
Women's	2023 Indoor	Sara Borton	Pole vault	5th	
Women's	2023 Indoor	Nastassja Campbell	Pole vault	6th	
Women's	2023 Indoor	Ida Eikeng	Pentathlon	8th	
Men's	2023 Outdoor	Cass Elliott	400 meters hurdles	7th	
Men's	2023 Outdoor	Nathan Green	1500 meters	1st	
Men's	2023 Outdoor	Joe Waskom	1500 meters	2nd	
Men's	2023 Outdoor	Jacob Englar	Pole vault	3rd	
Men's	2023 Outdoor	Elijah Mason	Discus throw	8th	
Women's	2023 Outdoor	Nastassja Campbell	Pole vault	2nd	
Women's	2023 Outdoor	Sara Borton	Pole vault	6th	
Men's	2024 Indoor	Luke Houser	Mile run	1st	
Men's	2024 Indoor	Joe Waskom	Mile run	8th	
Men's	2024 Indoor	Prestin Artis	Long jump	5th	
Men's	2024 Indoor	Jayden White	Weight throw	8th	
Men's	2024 Indoor	Bruno Comín Pescador	Heptathlon	5th	
Women's	2024 Indoor	Wilma Nielsen	800 meters	6th	
Women's	2024 Indoor	Hana Moll	Pole vault	1st	
Men's	2024 Outdoor	Joe Waskom	1500 meters	1st	
Men's	2024 Outdoor	Max Manson	Pole vault	8th	
Men's	2024 Outdoor	Chandler Ault	Javelin throw	2nd	
Women's	2024 Outdoor	Hana Moll	Pole vault	3rd	
Women's	2024 Outdoor	Nastassja Campbell	Pole vault	4th	
Women's	2024 Outdoor	Amanda Moll	Pole vault	5th	
Men's	2025 Indoor	Justin O'Toole	800 meters	6th	
Men's	2025 Indoor	Nathan Green	Mile run	2nd	
Men's	2025 Indoor	Ronan McMahon-Staggs	Mile run	6th	
Women's	2025 Indoor	Amina Maatoug	Mile run	5th	
Women's	2025 Indoor	Chloe Foerster	Mile run	6th	
Women's	2025 Indoor	Amina Maatoug	3000 meters	4th	
Women's	2025 Indoor	Mia Cochran	Distance medley relay	8th	
Women's	2025 Indoor	Anna Terrell	Distance medley relay	8th	
Women's	2025 Indoor	Claire Yerby	Distance medley relay	8th	
Women's	2025 Indoor	Julia David-Smith	Distance medley relay	8th	
Women's	2025 Indoor	Amanda Moll	Pole vault	1st	
Women's	2025 Indoor	Hana Moll	Pole vault	2nd	

== See also ==
- Category:Washington Huskies men's track and field athletes (56)
- Category:Washington Huskies women's track and field athletes (19)
