= Kansas State Wildcats track and field =

College track and field team

- University: Kansas State University
- Head coach: Travis Geopfert
- Conference: Big 12
- Location: Manhattan, Kansas
- Outdoor track: R.V. Christian Track
- Nickname: Wildcats
- Colors: Royal purple and white

The Kansas State Wildcats track and field team is the track and field program that represents Kansas State University. The Wildcats compete in NCAA Division I as a member of the Big 12 Conference. The team is based in Manhattan, Kansas, at the R.V. Christian Track.

The program is coached by Travis Geopfert. The track and field program officially encompasses four teams because the NCAA considers men's and women's indoor track and field and outdoor track and field as separate sports.

Long and triple jumper Kenny Harrison and high jumper Scott Sellers are the only two Kansas State athletes to have won three individual NCAA track and field titles. Kansas State also competes in the KU-KSU-WSU Triangular since 2015.

== Postseason ==
=== AIAW ===
The Wildcats have had 15 AIAW individual All-Americans finishing in the top six at the AIAW indoor or outdoor championships.

AIAW All-Americans
Championships	Name	Event	Place
1972 Outdoor	Teri Anderson	880 yards	2nd
1972 Outdoor	Teri Anderson	Mile run	1st
1973 Outdoor	Joyce Urish	4 × 440 yards relay	4th
1973 Outdoor	Carol Goering	4 × 440 yards relay	4th
1973 Outdoor	Dee Duffey	4 × 440 yards relay	4th
1973 Outdoor	Peggy Johns	4 × 440 yards relay	4th
1974 Outdoor	Janet Reusser	400 meters hurdles	5th
1974 Outdoor	Karen Brinker	4 × 440 yards relay	3rd
1974 Outdoor	Barb Eakin	4 × 440 yards relay	3rd
1974 Outdoor	Janet Reusser	4 × 440 yards relay	3rd
1974 Outdoor	Peggy Johns	4 × 440 yards relay	3rd
1974 Outdoor	Susie Norton	Javelin throw	2nd
1974 Outdoor	Marsha Poppe	Javelin throw	4th
1975 Outdoor	Diane Grout	Sprint medley relay	5th
1975 Outdoor	Sharon McKee	Sprint medley relay	5th
1975 Outdoor	Jan Smith	Sprint medley relay	5th
1975 Outdoor	Leesa Wallace	Sprint medley relay	5th
1975 Outdoor	Marsha Poppe	Javelin throw	2nd
1975 Outdoor	Susie Norton	Javelin throw	3rd
1976 Outdoor	Joyce Urish	1500 meters	5th
1976 Outdoor	Teri Anderson	2 miles	2nd
1976 Outdoor	Jane Wittmeyer	4 × 880 yards relay	4th
1976 Outdoor	Teri Anderson	4 × 880 yards relay	4th
1976 Outdoor	Renee Urish	4 × 880 yards relay	4th
1976 Outdoor	Joyce Urish	4 × 880 yards relay	4th
1976 Outdoor	Marsha Poppe	Javelin throw	2nd
1978 Indoor	Freda Hancock	440 yards	4th
1978 Indoor	Cindy Worcester	880 yards	2nd
1978 Indoor	Connie Prince	880 yards	5th
1978 Indoor	Michelle Brown	Mile run	6th
1978 Indoor	Lorraine Davidson	4 × 440 yards relay	3rd
1978 Indoor	Cindy Worcester	4 × 440 yards relay	3rd
1978 Indoor	Jan Smith	4 × 440 yards relay	3rd
1978 Indoor	Wanda Trent	4 × 440 yards relay	3rd
1978 Indoor	Linda Long	Shot put	6th
1979 Indoor	Wanda Trent	600 yards	4th
1979 Indoor	Janel LeValley	1000 yards	4th
1979 Indoor	Renee Urish	Mile run	3rd
1979 Indoor	Leesa Wallace	4 × 440 yards relay	2nd
1979 Indoor	Freda Hancock	4 × 440 yards relay	2nd
1979 Indoor	Lorraine Davidson	4 × 440 yards relay	2nd
1979 Indoor	Wanda Trent	4 × 440 yards relay	2nd
1979 Indoor	Annette Sittenauer	Long jump	4th
1981 Indoor	Wanda Trent	600 meters	3rd
1981 Indoor	Kim Hagger	Pentathlon	6th
1981 Outdoor	Deb Pihl	4 × 800 meters relay	6th
1981 Outdoor	Janel LeValley	4 × 800 meters relay	6th
1981 Outdoor	Sherry Thomas	4 × 800 meters relay	6th
1981 Outdoor	Wanda Trent	4 × 800 meters relay	6th

=== NCAA ===
As of August 2025, a total of 85 men and 67 women have achieved individual first-team All-American status at the Division I men's outdoor, women's outdoor, men's indoor, or women's indoor national championships (using the modern criteria of top-8 placing regardless of athlete nationality).

First team NCAA All-Americans
Team	Championships	Name	Event	Place	Ref.
Men's	1921 Outdoor	Ray Watson	Mile run	1st	
Men's	1922 Outdoor	Les Erwin	100 meters	3rd	
Men's	1922 Outdoor	Les Erwin	200 meters	5th	
Men's	1923 Outdoor	Ivan Riley	220 yards hurdles	6th	
Men's	1923 Outdoor	Ivan Riley	110 meters hurdles	1st	
Men's	1923 Outdoor	Les Erwin	200 meters	3rd	
Men's	1925 Outdoor	Ralph Kimport	Mile run	5th	
Men's	1927 Outdoor	Paul Gartner	220 yards hurdles	>6th	
Men's	1930 Outdoor	Milt Ehrlich	High jump	2nd	
Men's	1931 Outdoor	Milt Ehrlich	High jump	2nd	
Men's	1932 Outdoor	Harry Hinckley	110 meters hurdles	6th	
Men's	1935 Outdoor	Justus O'Reilly	Mile run	6th	
Men's	1935 Outdoor	William Wheelock	3000 meters	6th	
Men's	1937 Outdoor	Charles Socolofsky	Discus throw	3rd	
Men's	1938 Outdoor	Elmer Hackney	Shot put	1st	
Men's	1939 Outdoor	Elmer Hackney	Shot put	1st	
Men's	1940 Outdoor	Elmer Hackney	Shot put	6th	
Men's	1943 Outdoor	Homer Socolofsky	Javelin throw	5th	
Men's	1947 Outdoor	Rollin Prather	Discus throw	2nd	
Men's	1948 Outdoor	Rollin Prather	Shot put	3rd	
Men's	1948 Outdoor	Rollin Prather	Discus throw	4th	
Men's	1949 Outdoor	Rollin Prather	Discus throw	7th	
Men's	1950 Outdoor	Virgil Severns	High jump	2nd	
Men's	1950 Outdoor	Herb Hoskins	Long jump	4th	
Men's	1950 Outdoor	Jim Danielson	Long jump	6th	
Men's	1951 Outdoor	Thane Baker	100 meters	5th	
Men's	1951 Outdoor	Thane Baker	200 meters	4th	
Men's	1951 Outdoor	Virgil Severns	High jump	6th	
Men's	1952 Outdoor	Thane Baker	100 meters	8th	
Men's	1952 Outdoor	Thane Baker	200 meters	3rd	
Men's	1952 Outdoor	Dick Towers	1500 meters	8th	
Men's	1953 Outdoor	Thane Baker	100 meters	2nd	
Men's	1953 Outdoor	Thane Baker	200 meters	1st	
Men's	1956 Outdoor	Gene O'Connor	400 meters hurdles	4th	
Men's	1959 Outdoor	Rex Stucker	220 yards hurdles	6th	
Men's	1959 Outdoor	Rex Stucker	110 meters hurdles	6th	
Men's	1959 Outdoor	DeLoss Dodds	400 meters	6th	
Men's	1960 Outdoor	Rex Stucker	400 meters hurdles	7th	
Men's	1961 Outdoor	Jerry Hooker	110 meters hurdles	6th	
Men's	1966 Indoor	Don Payne	400 meters	1st	
Men's	1966 Indoor	Conrad Nightingale	Mile run	1st	
Men's	1967 Indoor	Charles Harper	Distance medley relay	1st	
Men's	1967 Indoor	Terry Holbrook	Distance medley relay	1st	
Men's	1967 Indoor	Wes Dutton	Distance medley relay	1st	
Men's	1967 Indoor	Conrad Nightingale	Distance medley relay	1st	
Men's	1967 Outdoor	Conrad Nightingale	3000 meters steeplechase	2nd	
Men's	1969 Indoor	Dave Peterson	4 × 800 meters relay	1st	
Men's	1969 Indoor	Jerome Howe	4 × 800 meters relay	1st	
Men's	1969 Indoor	Bob Barratti	4 × 800 meters relay	1st	
Men's	1969 Indoor	Ken Swenson	4 × 800 meters relay	1st	
Men's	1969 Indoor	Ray McGill	High jump	3rd	
Men's	1969 Outdoor	Ray McGill	High jump	5th	
Men's	1970 Indoor	Dale Alexander	4 × 800 meters relay	2nd	
Men's	1970 Indoor	Dave Peterson	4 × 800 meters relay	2nd	
Men's	1970 Indoor	Bob Barratti	4 × 800 meters relay	2nd	
Men's	1970 Indoor	Ken Swenson	4 × 800 meters relay	2nd	
Men's	1970 Outdoor	Ken Swenson	800 meters	1st	
Men's	1971 Indoor	Dale Alexander	600 yards	2nd	
Men's	1971 Indoor	Clardy Vinson	Distance medley relay	5th	
Men's	1971 Indoor	Dan Fiels	Distance medley relay	5th	
Men's	1971 Indoor	Dave Peterson	Distance medley relay	5th	
Men's	1971 Indoor	Jerome Howe	Distance medley relay	5th	
Men's	1971 Outdoor	Dale Alexander	400 meters	5th	
Men's	1971 Outdoor	Ed Morland	Javelin throw	6th	
Men's	1972 Indoor	Rick Hitchcock	Distance medley relay	2nd	
Men's	1972 Indoor	Clardy Vinson	Distance medley relay	2nd	
Men's	1972 Indoor	Jim Heggie	Distance medley relay	2nd	
Men's	1972 Indoor	Jerome Howe	Distance medley relay	2nd	
Men's	1972 Outdoor	Mike Lee	400 meters hurdles	4th	
Men's	1972 Outdoor	Jerome Howe	1500 meters	2nd	
Men's	1972 Outdoor	Rick Hitchcock	5000 meters	6th	
Men's	1972 Outdoor	Tom Brosius	Shot put	8th	
Men's	1972 Outdoor	Tom Brosius	Discus throw	7th	
Men's	1972 Outdoor	Ed Morland	Javelin throw	4th	
Men's	1973 Outdoor	Rick Slifer	High jump	5th	
Men's	1974 Indoor	Dean Williams	55 meters	5th	
Men's	1974 Indoor	Vance Roland	55 meters hurdles	3rd	
Men's	1974 Indoor	Jeff Schemmel	Mile run	4th	
Men's	1974 Indoor	Fred Merrill	4 × 400 meters relay	5th	
Men's	1974 Indoor	Bob Prince	4 × 400 meters relay	5th	
Men's	1974 Indoor	Vance Roland	4 × 400 meters relay	5th	
Men's	1974 Indoor	Bob Jones	4 × 400 meters relay	5th	
Men's	1975 Indoor	Vance Roland	55 meters hurdles	5th	
Men's	1975 Indoor	Jim Hinchliffe	Distance medley relay	1st	
Men's	1975 Indoor	Lennie Harrison	Distance medley relay	1st	
Men's	1975 Indoor	Ted Settle	Distance medley relay	1st	
Men's	1975 Indoor	Jeff Schemmel	Distance medley relay	1st	
Men's	1975 Outdoor	Vance Roland	110 meters hurdles	4th	
Men's	1976 Indoor	Bob Prince	800 meters	1st	
Men's	1976 Indoor	Jeff Schemmel	Mile run	2nd	
Men's	1976 Outdoor	Bob Prince	800 meters	8th	
Men's	1976 Outdoor	Frank Perbeck	Javelin throw	8th	
Men's	1977 Outdoor	Bob Prince	800 meters	7th	
Men's	1978 Indoor	Ed Delashmutt	1000 meters	4th	
Men's	1980 Indoor	Vince Parrette	Triple jump	3rd	
Men's	1981 Indoor	Doug Lytle	Pole vault	5th	
Men's	1981 Indoor	Vince Parrette	Triple jump	6th	
Men's	1981 Outdoor	Doug Lytle	Pole vault	3rd	
Men's	1981 Outdoor	Joe Bramlage	Javelin throw	6th	
Men's	1982 Indoor	Doug Lytle	Pole vault	1st	
Men's	1982 Indoor	Veryl Switzer	Long jump	3rd	
Men's	1982 Outdoor	Doug Lytle	Pole vault	2nd	
Men's	1982 Outdoor	Veryl Switzer	Long jump	7th	
Women's	1982 Outdoor	Kelly Wenlock	Long jump	7th	
Men's	1983 Indoor	Mike Bradley	600 yards	3rd	
Men's	1983 Indoor	Veryl Switzer	Long jump	2nd	
Men's	1983 Outdoor	Julius Mercer	400 meters hurdles	3rd	
Men's	1983 Outdoor	Gregg Bartlett	Shot put	7th	
Women's	1983 Outdoor	Rita Graves	High jump	7th	
Women's	1983 Outdoor	Pinkie Suggs	Shot put	8th	
Women's	1984 Indoor	Deborah Pihl	1000 meters	3rd	
Women's	1984 Indoor	Rita Graves	High jump	2nd	
Women's	1984 Outdoor	Deb Pihl	3000 meters	7th	
Women's	1984 Outdoor	Rita Graves	High jump	2nd	
Women's	1984 Outdoor	Pinkie Suggs	Shot put	5th	
Men's	1985 Indoor	Kenny Harrison	Long jump	5th	
Women's	1985 Indoor	Michelle Maxey	500 meters	5th	
Women's	1985 Indoor	Anne Stadler	1000 meters	6th	
Women's	1985 Indoor	Rita Graves	High jump	2nd	
Men's	1985 Outdoor	Andy Gillam	Shot put	7th	
Women's	1985 Outdoor	Michelle Maxey	400 meters	7th	
Women's	1985 Outdoor	Rita Graves	High jump	7th	
Men's	1986 Indoor	Kenny Harrison	Long jump	1st	
Men's	1986 Indoor	Kenny Harrison	Triple jump	5th	
Women's	1986 Indoor	Michelle Maxey	500 meters	3rd	
Women's	1986 Indoor	Rita Graves	High jump	2nd	
Men's	1986 Outdoor	Kenny Harrison	Long jump	6th	
Men's	1986 Outdoor	Kenny Harrison	Triple jump	1st	
Women's	1986 Outdoor	Anne Stadler	3000 meters	7th	
Women's	1986 Outdoor	Chris Vanatta	5000 meters	6th	
Women's	1986 Outdoor	Rita Graves	High jump	1st	
Women's	1986 Outdoor	Felicia Carpenter	Triple jump	6th	
Men's	1987 Indoor	Kenny Harrison	Long jump	3rd	
Men's	1987 Indoor	Kenny Harrison	Triple jump	2nd	
Women's	1987 Indoor	Felicia Carpenter	Triple jump	4th	
Women's	1987 Indoor	Pinkie Suggs	Shot put	3rd	
Men's	1987 Outdoor	Kenny Harrison	Triple jump	2nd	
Women's	1987 Outdoor	Jacque Struckhoff	10,000 meters	4th	
Women's	1987 Outdoor	Felicia Carpenter	Triple jump	6th	
Women's	1987 Outdoor	Pinkie Suggs	Shot put	2nd	
Men's	1988 Indoor	Kenny Harrison	Long jump	8th	
Men's	1988 Indoor	Kenny Harrison	Triple jump	1st	
Women's	1988 Indoor	Joy Jones	55 meters	7th	
Men's	1988 Outdoor	Jeff Reynolds	400 meters	7th	
Men's	1988 Outdoor	Kenny Harrison	Long jump	2nd	
Women's	1988 Outdoor	Felicia Carpenter	Triple jump	4th	
Men's	1989 Indoor	Jeff Reynolds	400 meters	3rd	
Men's	1989 Indoor	Jeff Reynolds	4 × 400 meters relay	4th	
Men's	1989 Indoor	Tyrone Watkins	4 × 400 meters relay	4th	
Men's	1989 Indoor	Corey King	4 × 400 meters relay	4th	
Men's	1989 Indoor	Sean Banks	4 × 400 meters relay	4th	
Women's	1989 Indoor	Kim Kilpatrick	55 meters hurdles	5th	
Men's	1989 Outdoor	Dan O'Mara	Discus throw	8th	
Men's	1989 Outdoor	Steve Fritz	Decathlon	6th	
Women's	1990 Indoor	Connie Teaberry	High jump	6th	
Women's	1990 Indoor	Carla Shannon	Triple jump	6th	
Women's	1990 Indoor	Angie Miller	Shot put	4th	
Men's	1990 Outdoor	Steve Fritz	Decathlon	4th	
Women's	1990 Outdoor	Janet Haskin	10,000 meters	1st	
Women's	1990 Outdoor	Connie Teaberry	High jump	4th	
Women's	1990 Outdoor	Angie Miller	Shot put	6th	
Men's	1991 Indoor	Clifton Etheridge	Triple jump	3rd	
Women's	1991 Indoor	Markeya Jones	200 meters	5th	
Men's	1991 Outdoor	John Rorabaugh	Javelin throw	5th	
Women's	1991 Outdoor	Connie Teaberry	High jump	7th	
Women's	1991 Outdoor	Angie Miller	Discus throw	7th	
Women's	1992 Indoor	Connie Teaberry	High jump	4th	
Women's	1992 Outdoor	Connie Teaberry	High jump	5th	
Men's	1993 Indoor	Thomas Randolph	55 meters	3rd	
Men's	1993 Indoor	Percell Gaskins	High jump	1st	
Women's	1993 Indoor	Gwen Wentland	High jump	2nd	
Men's	1993 Outdoor	Francis O'Neill	3000 meters steeplechase	4th	
Women's	1993 Outdoor	Gwen Wentland	High jump	2nd	
Men's	1994 Outdoor	Dante McGrew	Triple jump	5th	
Women's	1994 Outdoor	Nicole Green	400 meters	3rd	
Women's	1994 Outdoor	Kristen Schultz	Javelin throw	5th	
Women's	1995 Indoor	Belinda Hope	400 meters	5th	
Women's	1995 Indoor	Gwen Wentland	High jump	2nd	
Men's	1995 Outdoor	Ed Broxterman	High jump	2nd	
Women's	1995 Outdoor	Nicole Green	400 meters	1st	
Women's	1995 Outdoor	Gwen Wentland	High jump	2nd	
Men's	1996 Indoor	Itai Margalit	High jump	2nd	
Women's	1996 Indoor	Wanita Dykstra	High jump	4th	
Men's	1996 Outdoor	Itai Margalit	High jump	3rd	
Women's	1996 Outdoor	Vanitta Kinard	Triple jump	4th	
Men's	1997 Indoor	Keith Black	400 meters	5th	
Women's	1997 Indoor	Wanita Dykstra	High jump	2nd	
Women's	1997 Indoor	Vanitta Kinard	Triple jump	3rd	
Women's	1997 Indoor	Renetta Seiler	Weight throw	5th	
Women's	1997 Outdoor	Wanita Dykstra	High jump	6th	
Women's	1997 Outdoor	Vanitta Kinard	Triple jump	3rd	
Women's	1997 Outdoor	Renetta Seiler	Hammer throw	5th	
Women's	1998 Indoor	Vanitta Kinard	Triple jump	7th	
Women's	1998 Indoor	Renetta Seiler	Weight throw	2nd	
Men's	1998 Outdoor	Randy Melbourne	400 meters	7th	
Men's	1998 Outdoor	Scott Galas	4 × 400 meters relay	4th	
Men's	1998 Outdoor	Randy Melbourne	4 × 400 meters relay	4th	
Men's	1998 Outdoor	Perry McBride	4 × 400 meters relay	4th	
Men's	1998 Outdoor	Keith Black	4 × 400 meters relay	4th	
Men's	1998 Outdoor	Nathan Leeper	High jump	1st	
Men's	1998 Outdoor	Attila Zsivocky	Decathlon	2nd	
Women's	1998 Outdoor	Renetta Seiler	Hammer throw	5th	
Women's	1999 Indoor	Renetta Seiler	Weight throw	4th	
Women's	1999 Indoor	Anna Whitham	Weight throw	8th	
Men's	1999 Outdoor	Attila Zsivocky	Decathlon	2nd	
Men's	1999 Outdoor	Jason Williams	Decathlon	7th	
Women's	1999 Outdoor	Erin Anderson	Pole vault	8th	
Women's	1999 Outdoor	Renetta Seiler	Hammer throw	3rd	
Women's	1999 Outdoor	Anna Whitham	Hammer throw	5th	
Women's	2000 Indoor	Amy Mortimer	3000 meters	2nd	
Women's	2000 Indoor	Korene Hinds	Distance medley relay	3rd	
Women's	2000 Indoor	Rachel Woods	Distance medley relay	3rd	
Women's	2000 Indoor	Amanda Crouse	Distance medley relay	3rd	
Women's	2000 Indoor	Amy Mortimer	Distance medley relay	3rd	
Women's	2000 Indoor	Erin Anderson	Pole vault	2nd	
Women's	2000 Indoor	Anna Whitham	Weight throw	6th	
Women's	2000 Outdoor	Korene Hinds	3000 meters	2nd	
Women's	2000 Outdoor	Amy Mortimer	5000 meters	3rd	
Women's	2000 Outdoor	Erin Anderson	Pole vault	2nd	
Women's	2000 Outdoor	Cassi Morelock	Javelin throw	6th	
Men's	2001 Indoor	Shadrack Kimeli	3000 meters	5th	
Women's	2001 Indoor	Korene Hinds	Mile run	6th	
Women's	2001 Indoor	Amy Mortimer	Distance medley relay	3rd	
Women's	2001 Indoor	Nicole Grose	Distance medley relay	3rd	
Women's	2001 Indoor	Amanda Crouse	Distance medley relay	3rd	
Women's	2001 Indoor	Korene Hinds	Distance medley relay	3rd	
Women's	2001 Outdoor	Korene Hinds	800 meters	4th	
Women's	2001 Outdoor	Rebekah Green	Shot put	8th	
Women's	2001 Outdoor	Austra Skujyte	Heptathlon	1st	
Men's	2002 Indoor	Terence Newman	60 meters	5th	
Women's	2002 Indoor	Amy Mortimer	3000 meters	4th	
Women's	2002 Indoor	Austra Skujyte	Shot put	2nd	
Women's	2002 Outdoor	Amy Mortimer	1500 meters	4th	
Women's	2002 Outdoor	Austra Skujyte	Shot put	2nd	
Women's	2002 Outdoor	Rebekah Green	Shot put	5th	
Women's	2002 Outdoor	Kendra Wecker	Javelin throw	6th	
Women's	2002 Outdoor	Austra Skujyte	Heptathlon	1st	
Men's	2003 Indoor	Joseph Lee	800 meters	5th	
Women's	2003 Indoor	Amy Mortimer	3000 meters	6th	
Women's	2003 Indoor	Morgan High	High jump	6th	
Men's	2003 Outdoor	Kyle Lancaster	High jump	4th	
Women's	2003 Outdoor	Chaytan Hill	Triple jump	5th	
Women's	2003 Outdoor	Rebekah Green	Shot put	6th	
Men's	2004 Indoor	Christian Smith	800 meters	2nd	
Men's	2004 Indoor	Kyle Lancaster	High jump	3rd	
Women's	2004 Indoor	Chaytan Hill	Triple jump	2nd	
Women's	2004 Indoor	JaNelle Wright	Pentathlon	4th	
Men's	2004 Outdoor	Kyle Lancaster	High jump	2nd	
Women's	2004 Outdoor	Chaytan Hill	Triple jump	5th	
Women's	2004 Outdoor	JaNelle Wright	Heptathlon	8th	
Men's	2005 Indoor	Coby Cost	Weight throw	6th	
Men's	2005 Indoor	Darius Draudvila	Heptathlon	5th	
Women's	2005 Indoor	Lysaira Roman-del Valle	800 meters	4th	
Women's	2005 Indoor	Breanna Eveland	Pole vault	3rd	
Men's	2005 Outdoor	Kyle Lancaster	High jump	5th	
Women's	2005 Outdoor	Breanna Eveland	Pole vault	4th	
Women's	2005 Outdoor	Chaytan Hill	Triple jump	7th	
Women's	2005 Outdoor	Laci Heller	Hammer throw	8th	
Men's	2006 Indoor	Christian Smith	Mile run	1st	
Men's	2006 Indoor	Kyle Lancaster	High jump	2nd	
Women's	2006 Indoor	Breanna Eveland	Pole vault	3rd	
Men's	2006 Outdoor	Christian Smith	1500 meters	8th	
Men's	2006 Outdoor	Scott Sellers	High jump	3rd	
Women's	2006 Outdoor	Candice Mills	Long jump	4th	
Men's	2007 Indoor	Scott Sellers	High jump	3rd	
Women's	2007 Indoor	Kaylene Wagner	High jump	8th	
Women's	2007 Indoor	Loren Groves	Weight throw	6th	
Men's	2007 Outdoor	Scott Sellers	High jump	1st	
Men's	2007 Outdoor	Kyle Lancaster	High jump	4th	
Women's	2007 Outdoor	Kaylene Wagner	High jump	8th	
Men's	2008 Indoor	Scott Sellers	High jump	2nd	
Men's	2008 Indoor	Rok Derzanic	Heptathlon	8th	
Women's	2008 Indoor	Loren Groves	Weight throw	6th	
Men's	2008 Outdoor	Scott Sellers	High jump	4th	
Women's	2008 Outdoor	Loren Groves	Hammer throw	5th	
Men's	2009 Indoor	Scott Sellers	High jump	1st	
Men's	2009 Indoor	Moritz Cleve	Heptathlon	5th	
Men's	2009 Outdoor	Scott Sellers	High jump	1st	
Men's	2009 Outdoor	Moritz Cleve	Decathlon	3rd	
Women's	2009 Outdoor	Loren Groves	Hammer throw	7th	
Men's	2010 Outdoor	Jeffrey Julmis	110 meters hurdles	5th	
Men's	2010 Outdoor	Erik Kynard	High jump	6th	
Men's	2011 Indoor	Jeffrey Julmis	60 meters hurdles	5th	
Men's	2011 Indoor	Erik Kynard	High jump	3rd	
Men's	2011 Indoor	Mantas Silkauskas	Heptathlon	7th	
Women's	2011 Indoor	Ryann Krais	Pentathlon	6th	
Men's	2011 Outdoor	Jeffrey Julmis	110 meters hurdles	4th	
Men's	2011 Outdoor	Erik Kynard	High jump	1st	
Men's	2011 Outdoor	Moritz Cleve	Decathlon	8th	
Women's	2011 Outdoor	Ryann Krais	400 meters hurdles	3rd	
Women's	2011 Outdoor	Nina Kokot	Long jump	6th	
Women's	2011 Outdoor	Ryann Krais	Heptathlon	1st	
Men's	2012 Indoor	Erik Kynard	High jump	4th	
Women's	2012 Indoor	Boglarka Bozzay	800 meters	6th	
Women's	2012 Indoor	Ryann Krais	Pentathlon	5th	
Men's	2012 Outdoor	Erik Kynard	High jump	1st	
Men's	2012 Outdoor	Mantas Silkauskas	Long jump	7th	
Men's	2013 Indoor	Erik Kynard	High jump	3rd	
Women's	2013 Indoor	Merryl Mbeng	Pentathlon	6th	
Men's	2013 Outdoor	Erik Kynard	High jump	2nd	
Men's	2013 Outdoor	Kyle Wait	Pole vault	7th	
Men's	2013 Outdoor	Jharyl Bowry	Long jump	7th	
Men's	2014 Indoor	Kyle Wait	Pole vault	8th	
Men's	2014 Outdoor	Devin Field	Long jump	6th	
Men's	2014 Outdoor	Devin Field	Triple jump	2nd	
Women's	2014 Outdoor	Sonia Gaskin	800 meters	7th	
Women's	2014 Outdoor	Sonia Gaskin	4 × 400 meters relay	8th	
Women's	2014 Outdoor	Tia Gamble	4 × 400 meters relay	8th	
Women's	2014 Outdoor	Merryl Mbeng	4 × 400 meters relay	8th	
Women's	2014 Outdoor	Erica Twiss	4 × 400 meters relay	8th	
Women's	2014 Outdoor	Alyx Treasure	High jump	2nd	
Women's	2014 Outdoor	Sara Savatovic	Hammer throw	7th	
Women's	2015 Indoor	A'Keyla Mitchell	200 meters	5th	
Women's	2015 Indoor	Akela Jones	High jump	4th	
Women's	2015 Indoor	Akela Jones	Long jump	6th	
Women's	2015 Outdoor	Kimberly Williamson	High jump	2nd	
Women's	2015 Outdoor	Akela Jones	High jump	4th	
Women's	2015 Outdoor	Dani Hartung	Shot put	4th	
Women's	2015 Outdoor	Akela Jones	Heptathlon	1st	
Men's	2016 Indoor	Christoff Bryan	High jump	3rd	
Women's	2016 Indoor	A'Keyla Mitchell	200 meters	8th	
Women's	2016 Indoor	Akela Jones	High jump	1st	
Women's	2016 Indoor	Kimberly Williamson	High jump	3rd	
Women's	2016 Indoor	Dani Hartung	Shot put	1st	
Men's	2016 Outdoor	Christoff Bryan	High jump	2nd	
Men's	2016 Outdoor	Brett Neelly	Shot put	8th	
Women's	2016 Outdoor	Kimberly Williamson	High jump	1st	
Women's	2016 Outdoor	Shadae Lawrence	Discus throw	4th	
Women's	2016 Outdoor	Sara Savatovic	Hammer throw	2nd	
Men's	2017 Indoor	Christoff Bryan	High jump	5th	
Women's	2017 Indoor	Kimberly Williamson	High jump	7th	
Women's	2017 Indoor	Nina Schultz	Pentathlon	3rd	
Men's	2017 Outdoor	Christoff Bryan	High jump	1st	
Men's	2017 Outdoor	Christoff Bryan	High jump	1st	
Women's	2017 Outdoor	Akia Guerrier	4 × 100 meters relay	8th	
Women's	2017 Outdoor	A'Keyla Mitchell	4 × 100 meters relay	8th	
Women's	2017 Outdoor	Ranae McKenzie	4 × 100 meters relay	8th	
Women's	2017 Outdoor	Claudette Allen	4 × 100 meters relay	8th	
Women's	2017 Outdoor	Wurrie Njadoe	Long jump	8th	
Women's	2017 Outdoor	Shadae Lawrence	Discus throw	1st	
Women's	2017 Outdoor	Janee' Kassanavoid	Hammer throw	4th	
Women's	2017 Outdoor	Nina Schultz	Heptathlon	2nd	
Women's	2018 Indoor	Nina Schultz	Pentathlon	2nd	
Men's	2018 Outdoor	Tejaswin Shankar	High jump	1st	
Women's	2018 Outdoor	Ranae McKenzie	400 meters hurdles	5th	
Women's	2018 Outdoor	Shadae Lawrence	Discus throw	2nd	
Women's	2018 Outdoor	Helene Ingvaldsen	Hammer throw	7th	
Women's	2018 Outdoor	Nina Schultz	Heptathlon	7th	
Men's	2019 Indoor	Aaron Booth	Heptathlon	8th	
Women's	2019 Indoor	Shardia Lawrence	Triple jump	6th	
Men's	2019 Outdoor	Tejaswin Shankar	High jump	2nd	
Men's	2019 Outdoor	Brett Neelly	Discus throw	8th	
Men's	2019 Outdoor	Aaron Booth	Decathlon	6th	
Women's	2019 Outdoor	Shardia Lawrence	Triple jump	1st	
Women's	2019 Outdoor	Taylor Latimer	Shot put	4th	
Women's	2019 Outdoor	Lauren Taubert	Heptathlon	8th	
Men's	2021 Indoor	Tejaswin Shankar	High jump	3rd	
Women's	2021 Indoor	Taishia Pryce	Long jump	7th	
Men's	2021 Outdoor	Tejaswin Shankar	High jump	2nd	
Men's	2022 Indoor	Tejaswin Shankar	High jump	6th	
Women's	2022 Indoor	Kassidy Johnson	800 meters	5th	
Women's	2022 Indoor	Taishia Pryce	Long jump	6th	
Men's	2022 Outdoor	Tejaswin Shankar	High jump	1st	
Women's	2023 Outdoor	Emma Robbins	Hammer throw	4th	
Women's	2025 Indoor	Sharie Enoe	High jump	8th	
Men's	2025 Outdoor	Selva Prabhu	Triple jump	5th	
Men's	2025 Outdoor	Emil Uhlin	Decathlon	3rd	
Women's	2025 Outdoor	Safhia Hinds	400 meters	3rd	
Women's	2025 Outdoor	Jourdin Edwards	400 meters	7th	

== See also ==
- Category:Kansas State Wildcats men's track and field athletes (45)
- Category:Kansas State Wildcats women's track and field athletes (18)
