= Pole vault at the NCAA Division I Indoor Track and Field Championships =

The pole vault has been held at the NCAA Division I Indoor Track and Field Championships annually since 1965. The women's competition began in 1998, 15 years after the start of the NCAA Division I Women's Indoor Track and Field Championships.

== Winners ==
Key
A=Altitude assisted

Women's pole vault winners
Year	Athlete	Team	Mark
1998	Melissa Price	Fresno State Bulldogs	4.22m 13–10
1999	Melissa Price	Fresno State Bulldogs	4.25m 13-11¼
2000	Tracy O'Hara	UCLA Bruins	4.42m 14–6
2001	Thorey Elisdottir	Georgia Bulldogs	4.51m 14-9½
2002	Amy Linnen	Arizona Wildcats	4.53m 14-10¼
2003	Lacy Janson	Florida State Seminoles	4.45m 14-7¼
2004	Fanni Juhasz	Georgia Bulldogs	4.25m 13-11¼
2005	Amy Linnen	Kansas Jayhawks	4.30m 14-1¼
2006	Chelsea Johnson	UCLA Bruins	4.50m 14–9
2007	Elouise Rudy	Montana State Bobcats	4.30m 14-1¼
2008	Ellie Rudy	Montana State Bobcats	4.30m 14-1¼
2009	Kylie Hutson	Indiana State Sycamores	4.35m 14-3¼
2010	Kylie Hutson	Indiana State Sycamores	4.50m
2011	Tina Šutej	Arkansas Razorbacks	4.45m
2012	Tina Šutej	Arkansas Razorbacks	4.45m
2013	Natalia Bartnovskaya	Kansas Jayhawks	4.45m
2014	Kaitlin Petrillose	Texas Longhorns	4.60m A
2015	Sandi Morris	Arkansas Razorbacks	4.60m
2016	Lexi Weeks	Arkansas Razorbacks	4.63m
2017	Lakan Taylor	Alabama Crimson Tide	4.45m
2018	Lexi Jacobus	Arkansas Razorbacks	4.66m
2019	Lexi Jacobus	Arkansas Razorbacks	4.61m
2021	Lisa Gunnarsson	LSU Lady Tigers	4.56m
2022	Rachel Baxter	Virginia Tech Hokies	4.62m
2023	Amanda Fassold	Arkansas Razorbacks	4.45m A
2024	Hana Moll	Washington Huskies	4.60m
2025	Amanda Moll	Washington Huskies	4.70m
2026	Hana Moll	Washington Huskies	4.82m

Men's pole vault winners
Year	Athlete	Team	Mark
1965	Bob Yard	Washington State Cougars	4.78m 15-8¼
1966	Bill Fosdick	USC Trojans	4.88m 16-¼
1967	Bob Seagren	USC Trojans	5.19m 17-¼
1968	Paul Wilson	USC Trojans	5.08m 16–8
1969	Les Smith	Miami RedHawks	5.03m 16–6
1970	Jim Williamson	Maryland Terrapins	5.03m 16–6
1971	Scott Wallick	Miami RedHawks	5.08m 16–8
1972	Jan Johnson	Alabama Crimson Tide	5.21m 17-1¼
1973	Terry Porter	Kansas Jayhawks	5.18m 17–0
1974	Larry Jessee	UTEP Miners	5.03m 16–6
1975	Earl Bell	Arkansas State Red Wolves	5.23m 17–2
1976	Earl Bell	Arkansas State Red Wolves	5.50m 18-¾
1977	Don Baird	Long Beach State Beach	5.28m 17–4
1978	Mike Tully	UCLA Bruins	5.62m 18-5¼
1979	Geoffrey Stiles	Harvard Crimson	5.26m 17–3
1980	Randy Hall	Texas A&M Aggies	5.42m 17-9¼
1981	Ed Langford	Purdue Boilermakers	5.42m 17-9¼
1982	Doug Lytle	Kansas State Wildcats	5.43m 17-9¾
1983	Felix Bohni	San Jose State Spartans	5.63m 18-5½
1984	Joe Dial	Oklahoma State Cowboys	5.49m 18–0
1985	Joe Dial	Oklahoma State Cowboys	5.64m 18–6
1986	Doug Fraley	Fresno State Bulldogs	5.58m 18-3¾
1987	Doug Fraley	Fresno State Bulldogs	5.56m 18-2¾
1988	Dean Starkey	Illinois Fighting Illini	5.43m 17-9¾
1989	Dean Starkey	Illinois Fighting Illini	5.65m 18-6½
1990	István Bagyula	George Mason Patriots	5.65m 18-6½
1991	István Bagyula	George Mason Patriots	5.81m 19-¾
1992	Istvan Bagyula	George Mason Patriots	5.60m 18-4½
1993	Martin Eriksson	Minnesota Golden Gophers	5.50m 18-½
1994	Lawrence Johnson	Tennessee Volunteers	5.83m 19-1½
1995	Tim Mack	Tennessee Volunteers	5.60m 18-4½
1996	Lawrence Johnson	Tennessee Volunteers	5.65m 18-6½
1997	Jason Hinkin	Long Beach State Beach	5.65m 18-6½
1998	Vesa Rantanen	Minnesota Golden Gophers	5.55m 18-2½
1999	Jacob Davis	Texas Longhorns	5.85m 19-2¼
2000	Russ Buller	LSU Tigers	5.70m 18-8¼
2001	Jacob Pauli	Northern Iowa Panthers	5.68m 18-7½
2002	Jeff Hansen	BYU Cougars	5.48m 17-11¾
2003	Brad Walker	Washington Huskies	5.80m 19-¼
2004	Brad Walker	Washington Huskies	5.70m 18-8¼
2005	Tommy Skipper	Oregon Ducks	5.60m 18-4½
2006	Tommy Skipper	Oregon Ducks	5.65m 18-6½
2007	Brad Gebauer	McNeese State Cowboys	5.50m 18-½
2008	Rory Quiller	Binghamton Bearcats	5.50m 18-½
2009	Jason Colwick	Rice Owls	5.60m 18-4½
2010	Scott Roth	Washington Huskies	5.60m
2011	Scott Roth	Washington Huskies	5.50m
2012	Andrew Irwin	Arkansas Razorbacks	5.55m
2013	Andrew Irwin	Arkansas Razorbacks	5.70m
2014	Shawn Barber	Akron Zips	5.75m A
2015	Shawn Barber	Akron Zips	5.91m
2016	Jax Thoirs	Washington Huskies	5.50m
2017	Chris Nilsen	South Dakota Coyotes	5.70m
2018	Hussain Al Hizam	Kansas Jayhawks	5.70m
2019	Armand Duplantis	LSU Tigers	5.83m
2021	KC Lightfoot	Baylor Bears	5.93m
2022	Sondre Guttormsen	Princeton Tigers	5.75m
2023	Sondre Guttormsen	Princeton Tigers	6.00m A
2024	Keaton Daniel	Kentucky Wildcats	5.70m
2025	Simen Guttormsen	Duke Blue Devils	5.71m
2026	Ashton Barkdull	Kansas Jayhawks	5.80m
