= Luke Houser =

American track and field athlete (born 2001)

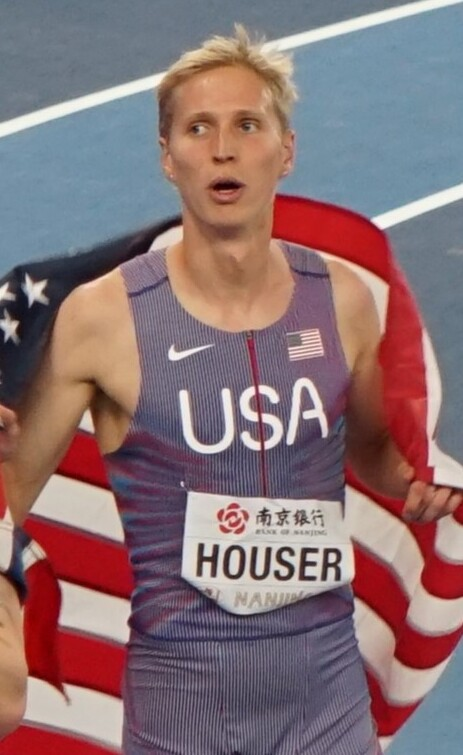
- Houser in 2025

Personal information
- Nationality: United States
- Born: May 2, 2001 (age 25) Bellevue, Washington, U.S.
- Education: University of Washington

Sport
- Sport: Athletics
- Events: 800 metres, 1500 metres, Mile, 3000 metres
- University team: University of Washington Huskies
- Club: Atlanta Track Club (2024-present) Brooks Beasts (2024)
- Turned pro: June 2024
- Coached by: Tom Nohilly (2024-present), Danny Mackay (2024), Julian Florez (2024), Andy Powell (2019–2024)

Achievements and titles
- Highest world ranking: 77th (1500 metres), 222nd (5000 meters)
Medal record
Men's athletics
Representing United States
World Indoor Championships
Bronze medal – third place	2025 Nanjing	1500 m

Luke Houser (born May 2, 2001) is an American middle and long-distance runner who currently competes professionally for Atlanta Track Club. Running collegiately for the University of Washington, he was a four-time first-team all-American and won two consecutive NCAA DI Indoor national mile titles in 2023 and 2024.

== Early life and background ==
Houser was born on May 2, 2001 in Bellevue, Washington to parents Carolyn and Chris Houser.

== Prep career ==
Houser began his prep career at Woodinville High School with a 25th-place finish at the 4A Washington State cross-country meet his first year. His second year he improved to 11th. Houser made his outdoor track state meet debut as a junior taking 4th in the 1600 metres and 6th in the 3200 metres. In his senior season, Houser set new personal bests in the 800 metres, 1600 metres, and 3200 metres, as well as a new highest placing of 4th at state cross-country. At state track, he took 3rd in the 1600 metres behind future University of Washington teammates Daniel Maton and Joe Waskom, as well as second in the 3200 metres this time falling only to Waskom. Both results were personal best performances and his 4:08.17 in the 1600 metres was the 11th-best in the US for high schoolers that year.

== Collegiate career ==
Houser only competed in indoor track his first year at Washington, but set a new personal best and school freshman record in the 3000 metres in a time of 7:58.96.

As a sophomore in his first NCAA cross-country season, Houser placed 10th at the 2020 Pac-12 conference meet and 51st at nationals. During the following outdoor season in 2021, he ran a new personal best 5000 metre time of 13:43.33 which qualified him for the NCAA DI West Regional Championships where he placed 45th overall in the 5000.

Houser broke the 4-minute mile barrier during the 2022 indoor season in a time of 3:57.17. Later that year he claimed his first NCAA DI first-team all-American honors taking 7th in the distance medley relay alongside teammates Joe Waskom, Anthony Smith, and Cass Elliott at the 2022 NCAA DI Indoor Track and Field Championships. That outdoor season, his junior year, Houser broke onto the national scene taking 2nd at the 2022 Pac-12 Conference Track and Field Championships 1500 metres and went on to take 5th at the NCAA national meet, his second first-team all-American placement. Both of those races were won by teammate Joe Waskom.

As a senior in fall 2022, Houser placed 42nd at the NCAA DI Cross-Country Championships. At the 2023 NCAA DI Indoor Track and Field Championships, he won the mile, taking first-team all-American honors and becoming the first University of Washington athlete to do so. At the NCAA outdoor meet later that year, Houser took 10th in the 1500 meters earning second-team all-American honors.

In Houser's fifth year at Washington, he again won the NCAA indoor mile title. As part of another University of Washington distance medley relay earlier in the year, this time with teammates Joe Waskom, Daniel Gaik, and Nathan Green, Houser set an American record in the event with a mark of 9:18.81. He also picked up second-team all-American honors outdoors placing 12th in the 1500 metres at the NCAA championships.

== Professional career ==
Houser signed a professional contract with Brooks in June 2024 and joined their flagship training group the Brooks Beasts based in Seattle, Washington, but left shortly thereafter. He joined Atlanta Track Club, an adidas supported team, in late 2024.

Houser won a bronze medal in the 1500 meters at the 2025 World Athletics Indoor Championships in Nanjing, China.

== Personal bests ==
Surface	Event	Mark	Date	Venue
Indoor	1500 m	3:35.85	March 2, 2025	Boston University Track & Tennis Center, Boston, MA
Indoor	Mile	3:51.14	March 2, 2025	Boston University Track & Tennis Center, Boston MA
Indoor	3000 m	8:03.44	February 2, 2025	The Track at New Balance, Boston, MA
Indoor	DMR	9:18.81	February 16, 2024	Randal Tyson Indoor Center, Fayetteville, AR
Outdoor	800 m	1:49.13	July 20, 2024	Stedelijke Atletiekpiste, Ninove, Belgium
Outdoor	1500 m	3:33.99	June 15, 2025	Stockholm Olympic Stadium, Stockholm, Sweden
Outdoor	Mile	3:51.14	January 27, 2024	Dempsey Indoor, Seattle, WA
Outdoor	3000 m	7:40.40	January 13, 2024	Dempsey Indoor, Seattle, WA
Outdoor	5000 m	13:43.33	April 30, 2021	Veterans Memorial Stadium, Clovis, CA
