= Athletics at the 1971 Pan American Games – Women's pentathlon =

Women's pentathlon at the Pan American Games

The women's pentathlon event at the 1971 Pan American Games was held in Cali on 4 and 5 August.

== Results ==
The highest mark recorded in each event is highlighted in yellow

Rank	Athlete	Nationality	100m H	SP	HJ	LJ	200m	Points	Notes
1st place, gold medalist(s)	Debbie Van Kiekebelt	Canada	14.5	12.36	1.73	6.13	25.0	4290	
2nd place, silver medalist(s)	Penny May	Canada	14.0	12.69	1.50	6.03	25.0	4112	
3rd place, bronze medalist(s)	Aída dos Santos	Brazil	14.7	11.51	1.53	5.42	24.6	3887	
4	Marilyn King	United States	14.2	11.04	1.45	5.83	25.2	3867	
5	Lucía Vaamonde	Venezuela	14.7	9.82	1.53	5.90	25.2	3831	
6	Mercedes Román	Mexico	14.5	9.75	1.53	5.68	25.7	3758	
7	Emilia Dyrzka	Argentina	14.3	11.70	1.35	5.52	26.0	3641	
8	Silvia Tapia	Mexico	15.7	9.84	1.50	5.07	26.7	3381	
9	Ana Clara Goldman	Argentina	15.7	9.76	1.35	5.65	26.5	3350	
10	Branwen Smith	Bermuda	15.5	8.86	1.40	5.39	26.9	3292	
	Judy Durham	United States	14.9	10.06	1.59	5.62	DNS	DNF	
	Marlene Elejarde	Cuba	13.7	11.00	1.40	5.27	DNS	DNF	
	Marcia Garbey	Cuba	15.9	9.74	1.40	?	–	DNF	
