= Lucía Vaamonde =

Venezuelan hurdler

Personal information
- Nationality: Venezuelan
- Born: 13 December 1949 (age 76)
- Height: 1.68 m (5 ft 6 in)
- Weight: 55 kg (121 lb)

Sport
- Sport: Track and field
- Event: 100 metres hurdles
Medal record
Representing Venezuela
Volleyball
Bolivarian Games
Silver medal – second place	1965 Quito	Women's tournament

Lucía Vaamonde (born 13 December 1949) is a Venezuelan hurdler. She competed in the women's 100 metres hurdles at the 1976 Summer Olympics.

Vaamonde was formerly an international volleyball player for Venezuela. She won the silver medal in volleyball at the 1965 Bolivarian Games and played for the Venezuela women's national volleyball team in volleyball at the 1967 Pan American Games. She was convinced by Gisela Vidal to start track and field to get in shape for volleyball.

Vaamonde represented the Cal State East Bay Pioneers in early women's collegiate competition, anchoring their team to win the sprint medley relay at the 1972 DGWS Outdoor Track and Field Championships. In 1973, she represented the Denver CityHawks and in 1974 she was a member of the winning Texas Woman's Pioneers team.

Vaamonde lived with Marilyn King in Fremont, California, until the 1972 Olympics, after which King planned to move with Vaamonde back to Venezuela to train under Vaamonde's father.

== International competitions ==
Year	Competition	Venue	Position	Event	Notes
Representing Venezuela
1970	Central American and Caribbean Games	Panama City, Panama	5th	Long jump	5.75 m
1970	Central American and Caribbean Games	Panama City, Panama	5th	Pentathlon	4153 pts
1970	Bolivarian Games	Maracaibo, Venezuela	1st	100 m hurdles	14.8
1970	Bolivarian Games	Maracaibo, Venezuela	2nd	4 × 100 m relay	47.5
1970	Bolivarian Games	Maracaibo, Venezuela	1st	Long jump	5.78 m
1970	Bolivarian Games	Maracaibo, Venezuela	1st	Pentathlon	4403 pts
1971	Central American and Caribbean Championships	Kingston, Jamaica	3rd	4 × 100 m relay	5.36 m
1971	Central American and Caribbean Championships	Kingston, Jamaica	2nd	Pentathlon	4333 pts
1971	Pan American Games	Cali, Colombia	5th	Pentathlon	3831 pts
1973	Bolivarian Games	Panama City, Panama	3rd	4 × 100 m relay	48.2
1973	Bolivarian Games	Panama City, Panama	2nd	Long jump	5.87 m
1973	Bolivarian Games	Panama City, Panama	2nd	Pentathlon	3825 pts
1976	Olympic Games	Mexico City, Mexico	23rd (h)	100 m hurdles	19.17

== Personal bests ==
- 100 metres hurdles – 14.0 (1975)
- Pentathlon – 3840 (1971)
