= Diamara Planell =

Puerto Rican Olympic athlete (born 1993)

Personal information
- Full name: Diamara Rosaura Planell Cruz
- Nationality: Puerto Rican
- Born: February 16, 1993 (age 33) San Juan, Puerto Rico

Sport
- Country: Puerto Rico
- Sport: Track and field
- Event: Pole vault
- College team: Washington
Medal record
Women's athletics
Representing Puerto Rico
Central American and Caribbean Games
Silver medal – second place	2014 Veracruz	Pole vault
Ibero-American Championships
Silver medal – second place	2016 Rio de Janeiro	Pole vault

Diamara Rosaura Planell Cruz (born February 16, 1993) is a Puerto Rican track and field athlete who specialises in the pole vault. She has qualified for 2016 Summer Olympics. Los Altos women's pole vault school record, CCS Champion CA state meet competitor San Jose city College school record holder, 2 time CA Junior College state meet champion, CA state meet record

She attended San Jose City College in San Jose, California. She then competed for the Washington Huskies track and field team, where she was an All-American finishing 3rd at the 2016 NCAA Division I Indoor Track and Field Championships.

== Personal bests ==
Event	Setting	Record	Venue	Date
Pole vault	Outdoor	4.50	Norwalk, California	16 April 2016
Pole vault	Indoor	4.45	Birmingham	12 March 2016
