= Pasco Invitational =

The Pasco Invitational is an annual track and field competition for high school athletes in the Pacific Northwest, held in mid April in Pasco, Washington.

== Overview ==
The Invitational hosted its first event in 1962, ever since it has been the premier Track and Field event in the state of Washington. The Pasco Invitational features top high school athletes and teams from primarily Washington state with teams also competing from Oregon and other states. This track meet features better caliber competition than the WIAA State Track and Field Championships. This is because, at the Washington state meet, the best from each classification compete only against others in their classification. In the Pasco Invitational, all athletes compete against each other regardless of their school's classification/size; the competition is also deeper due to the additional out-of-state athletes who come to the Invite.

Most notable stars from the Pasco Invitational included Brad Walker, Ja'Warren Hooker, Anthony Buchanan, Chris Lukezic, and Ernie Conwell.
