= Taryn Parks =

American middle-distance runner

Personal information
- Born: 6 May 2002 (age 24)

Sport
- Sport: Athletics
- Events: Middle-distance running, Cross country running

Achievements and titles
- Personal bests: 800m: 2:02.67 (2025); 1500m: 4:05.14 (2026); Mile: 4:23.10 (2026); 3000m: 9:34.21 (2023); 5000m: 16:06.62 (2024)

Taryn Parks (born 6 May 2002) is an American middle-distance and cross country runner.

== Biography ==
From Pennsylvania, Parks won PIAA titles in cross country and on the track, including the girls 800 metres at the PIAA District 3 track and field championships at Shippensburg University and the girls mile at New Balance Indoor Nationals in 2019 in New York with the fastest high school time in Pennsylvania history with 4:39.05, and the 3A 1600m run in 4:37.07 that year at the PIAA track and field championships. In June 2019, she ran a personal best for the mile of 4:42.37 to place second at the Brooks PR Invitational.

Parks graduated from Greencastle-Antrim High School in 2020. After attending University of North Carolina she won All-American honors for the first time as a Tar Heel at the NCAA Division I Cross Country Championships in Madison, Wisconsin, on November 23, 2024. An ACC champion in the indoor mile, that year Parks lowered her personal best to 2:02.70 for the 800 metres and 4:10.67 in the 1500 metres. As a grad student in 2025, Parks qualified for the NCAA Outdoor Championships with a fifth-place finish in her 1500m heat at the NCAA regionals in Jacksonville.

Parks placed fifth over 1500 metres at the 2026 USA Indoor Championships in 4:12.96. In February 2026, she ran an indoor personal best for the mile of 4:10.23 at the Boston University David Hemery Valentine Invitational. Also in Boston, Parks placed third in the B.A.A. Mile in April 2026. The following month, Parks acted as pacemaker in the China swing of the 2026 Diamond League. On 23 July 2026, competing in the 1500 metres at the 2026 USA Outdoor Track and Field Championships in New York, Parks qualified for the final with a personal best 4:05.14.

== Personal life ==
As of 2026, Parks trains with the Golden Peaks Track Club in Flagstaff, Arizona, alongside Ellie Baker and Katie Izzo, amongst others, and is sponsored by Adidas.
