= 2011 NCAA Division I Indoor Track and Field Championships =

- Dates: March 11-12, 2011
- Host city: College Station, Texas; Texas A&M University
- Venue: Gilliam Indoor Track Stadium
- Events: 32

The 2011 NCAA Division I Indoor Track and Field Championships was the 46th NCAA Men's Division I Indoor Track and Field Championships and the 29th NCAA Women's Division I Indoor Track and Field Championships, held at the Gilliam Indoor Track Stadium in College Station, Texas near the campus of the host school, Texas A&M University. In total, thirty-two different men's and women's indoor track and field events were contested from March 11 to March 12, 2011.

The meeting was noted for being the venue of Jordan Hasay's first two NCAA titles.

== Team scores ==
- Note: Top 3 only
- Scoring: 10 points for a 1st-place finish in an event, 8 points for 2nd, 6 points for 3rd, 5 points for 4th, 4 points for 5th, 3 points for 6th, 2 points for 7th, and 1 point for 8th.

=== Men's teams ===
Pl.	Team	Points
1	Florida	52
2	Texas A&M	40
3	Brigham Young	34

=== Women's teams ===
Pl.	Team	Points
1	Oregon	67
2	Texas	38
3	Louisiana State	37

== Results ==
=== Men ===
==== 60 meters ====
Rank	Athlete	Team	Time	Notes
1st place, gold medalist(s)	Jeff Demps	Florida	6.53	

==== 200 meters ====
Rank	Athlete	Team	Time	Notes
1st place, gold medalist(s)	Rakieem Salaam	Oklahoma	20.41	

==== 400 meters ====
Rank	Athlete	Team	Time	Notes
1st place, gold medalist(s)	Demetrius Pinder	Texas A&M	45.33	

==== 800 meters ====
Rank	Athlete	Team	Time	Notes
1st place, gold medalist(s)	Fred Samoei	Alabama	1:48.33	

==== Mile run ====
Rank	Athlete	Team	Time	Notes
1st place, gold medalist(s)	Miles Batty	Brigham Young	3:59.49	

==== 3000 meters ====
Rank	Athlete	Team	Time	Notes
1st place, gold medalist(s)	Elliott Heath	Stanford	8:03.71	

==== 5000 meters ====
Rank	Athlete	Team	Time	Notes
1st place, gold medalist(s)	Leonard Korir	Iona	13:26.01	

==== 60 meter hurdles ====
Rank	Athlete	Team	Time	Notes
1st place, gold medalist(s)	Andrew Riley	Illinois	7.58	

==== 4 × 400 meter relay ====
Rank	Athletes	Team	Time	Notes
1st place, gold medalist(s)	Tran Howell; Demetrius Pinder; Bryan Miller; Tabarie Henry	Texas A&M	3:04.24	

==== Distance medley relay ====
Rank	Athletes	Team	Time	Notes
1st place, gold medalist(s)	Brian Weirich; Chris Carter; Justin Hedin; Miles Batty	Brigham Young	9:29.28	

==== High jump ====
Rank	Athlete	Team	Mark	Notes
1st place, gold medalist(s)	Derek Drouin	Indiana	2.33 m	

==== Pole vault ====
Rank	Athlete	Team	Mark	Notes
1st place, gold medalist(s)	Scott Roth	Washington	5.50 m	

==== Long jump ====
Rank	Athlete	Team	Mark	Notes
1st place, gold medalist(s)	Ngonidzashe Makusha	Florida State	8.14 m	

==== Triple jump ====
Rank	Athlete	Team	Mark	Notes
1st place, gold medalist(s)	Will Claye	Florida	17.32 m	

==== Shot put ====
Rank	Athlete	Team	Mark	Notes
1st place, gold medalist(s)	Leif Arrhenius	Brigham Young	19.92 m	

==== Weight throw ====
Rank	Athlete	Team	Mark	Notes
1st place, gold medalist(s)	Walter Henning	Louisiana State	22.16 m	

==== Heptathlon ====
Rank	Athlete	Team	Mark	Notes
1st place, gold medalist(s)	Miller Moss	Clemson	5986 pts	

=== Women ===
==== 60 meters ====
Rank	Athlete	Team	Time	Notes
1st place, gold medalist(s)	Lakya Brookins	South Carolina	7.09	

==== 200 meters ====
Rank	Athlete	Team	Time	Notes
1st place, gold medalist(s)	Kimberlyn Duncan	Louisiana State	22.85	

==== 400 meters ====
Rank	Athlete	Team	Time	Notes
1st place, gold medalist(s)	Jessica Beard	Texas A&M	50.79	

==== 800 meters ====
Rank	Athlete	Team	Time	Notes
1st place, gold medalist(s)	Lacey Bleazard	Brigham Young	2:04.09	

==== Mile run ====
Rank	Athlete	Team	Time	Notes
1st place, gold medalist(s)	Jordan Hasay	Oregon	4:33.01	

==== 3000 meters ====
Rank	Athlete	Team	Time	Notes
1st place, gold medalist(s)	Jordan Hasay	Oregon	9:13.71	

==== 5000 meters ====
Rank	Athlete	Team	Time	Notes
1st place, gold medalist(s)	Jackie Areson	Tennessee	16:04.16	

==== 60 meter hurdles ====
Rank	Athlete	Team	Time	Notes
1st place, gold medalist(s)	Brianna Rollins	Clemson	7.96	

==== 4 × 400 meter relay ====
Rank	Athletes	Team	Time	Notes
1st place, gold medalist(s)	Jeneba Tarmoh; Ibukun Mayungbe; Andrea Sutherland; Jessica Beard	Texas A&M	3:29.72	

==== Distance medley relay ====
Rank	Athletes	Team	Time	Notes
1st place, gold medalist(s)	Emily Lipari; Christie Verdier; Ariann Neutts; Sheila Reid	Villanova	10:52.52	

==== High jump ====
Rank	Athlete	Team	Mark	Notes
1st place, gold medalist(s)	Brigetta Barrett	Arizona	1.90 m	

==== Pole vault ====
Rank	Athlete	Team	Mark	Notes
1st place, gold medalist(s)	Tina Sutej	Arkansas	4.45 m	

==== Long jump ====
Rank	Athlete	Team	Mark	Notes
1st place, gold medalist(s)	Tori Bowie	Southern Mississippi	6.52 m	

==== Triple jump ====
Rank	Athlete	Team	Mark	Notes
1st place, gold medalist(s)	Kimberly Williams	Florida State	13.96 m	

==== Shot put ====
Rank	Athlete	Team	Mark	Notes
1st place, gold medalist(s)	Julie Labonte	Arizona	17.53 m	

==== Weight throw ====
Rank	Athlete	Team	Mark	Notes
1st place, gold medalist(s)	Felisha Johnson	Indiana State	22.69 m	

==== Pentathlon ====
Rank	Athlete	Team	Mark	Notes
1st place, gold medalist(s)	Brianne Theisen	Oregon	4540 pts	

== See also ==
- NCAA Men's Division I Indoor Track and Field Championships
- NCAA Women's Division I Indoor Track and Field Championships
