= 1972 DGWS Outdoor Track and Field Championships =

National women's athletics collegiate championship event

- Dates: May 12–13, 1972
- Host city: Knoxville, Tennessee; University of Tennessee
- Venue: Tom Black Track

The 1972 DGWS Outdoor Track And Field Championships were the 4th annual Division for Girls' and Women's Sports-sanctioned track meet to determine the individual and team national champions of women's collegiate track and field events in the United States. They were contested May 12−13, 1972 in Knoxville, Tennessee at the Tom Black Track by host University of Tennessee.

There were not separate Division I, II, and III championships for outdoor track and field until 1981. The meet would be called the DGWS Championships until 1972, after which the DGWS changed its name to the Association for Intercollegiate Athletics for Women (AIAW).

The meeting was highlighted by Sherry Calvert's 58.52 m throw in the javelin, at the time the best mark in the U.S. that year and among the best in the world despite the competition being hindered by rain. The Cal State East Bay Pioneers (then known as Cal State Hayward) won the team title by 33 points over a field of 48 schools.

== Team standings ==
- Scoring: 10 points for a 1st-place finish, 8 points for 2nd, 6 points for 3rd, 4 points for 4th, 2 points for 5th, and 1 point for 6th. Top 10 teams shown.

Rank	Team	Points
1st place, gold medalist(s)	Cal State East Bay Pioneers	76
2nd place, silver medalist(s)	Texas Woman's Pioneers	43
3rd place, bronze medalist(s)	Flathead Valley Mountainettes	30
4th	Illinois Fighting Illini	26
5th	LIU Brooklyn Blackbirds	20
6th	Brooklyn Bulldogs	18
6th	Kansas State Wildcats	18
6th	Seattle Pacific Falcons	18
6th	Western Washington Vikings	18
10th	UMass Minutewomen	16
10th	Texas Tech Red Raiders	16

== Results ==
- Only top six results of finals are shown

100 yards
Pl.	Name	Team	Mark
1st place, gold medalist(s)	Pat Hawkins	LIU Brooklyn Blackbirds	10.8
2nd place, silver medalist(s)	Kathy Lawson	UMass Minutewomen	10.9
3rd place, bronze medalist(s)	Rochelle Barker	Texas Woman's Pioneers	11.0
4th	Lessie Johnson	Cal State East Bay Pioneers	11.1
5th	Alexis Crawford	TCNJ Lions	11.2
6th	Roberta Stetson	Flathead Valley Mountainettes	11.5

220 yards
Pl.	Name	Team	Mark
1st place, gold medalist(s)	Linda Reynolds	Brooklyn Bulldogs	24.7
2nd place, silver medalist(s)	Kathy Lawson	UMass Minutewomen	25.0
3rd place, bronze medalist(s)	Brenda Bryan	Texas Tech Red Raiders	25.2
4th	Rochelle Barker	Texas Woman's Pioneers	25.3
5th	Lucy Vaamonde	Cal State East Bay Pioneers	25.8
6th	Alexis Crawford	TCNJ Lions	25.9

440 yards
Pl.	Name	Team	Mark
1st place, gold medalist(s)	Cis Shafer	Cal State East Bay Pioneers	56.4
2nd place, silver medalist(s)	Diedra Moore	Brooklyn Bulldogs	57.9
3rd place, bronze medalist(s)	Shirley Swanson	Western Washington Vikings	58.7
4th	Cathy Sellers	Texas Woman's Pioneers	59.7
5th	Lora Van Wyk	College of the Ozarks Bobcats	1:00.1
6th	Mindy Sharpe	Flathead Valley Mountainettes	1:00.8

880 yards
Pl.	Name	Team	Mark
1st place, gold medalist(s)	Cis Shafer	Cal State East Bay Pioneers	2:11.8
2nd place, silver medalist(s)	Teri Anderson	Kansas State Wildcats	2:12.4
3rd place, bronze medalist(s)	Kathy Kuyk	Puget Sound Loggers	2:19.4
4th	Lynae Larson	Dickinson State Blue Hawks	2:21.9
4th	Mary Hartzell	Texas State Bobcats	2:21.9
6th	Diana Hooker	Texas Woman's Pioneers	2:23.0

Mile run
Pl.	Name	Team	Mark
1st place, gold medalist(s)	Teri Anderson	Kansas State Wildcats	4:45.8
2nd place, silver medalist(s)	Kathy Kuyk	Puget Sound Loggers	5:03.9
3rd place, bronze medalist(s)	Merilee Underhill	Washington State Cougars	5:06.5
4th	Maria Stearns	Seattle Pacific Falcons	5:11.3
5th	Patty Melby	Wisconsin–La Crosse Eagles	5:13.0
6th	Sharon Burgess	Florida State Seminoles	5:13.1

100 m hurdles
Pl.	Name	Team	Mark
1st place, gold medalist(s)	Donna Schulenberg	Illinois Fighting Illini	14.2
2nd place, silver medalist(s)	Kathi Guiney	Dean Bulldogs	14.2
3rd place, bronze medalist(s)	Wendy Taylor	Western Washington Vikings	14.5
4th	Mary Lalum	Flathead Valley Mountainettes	14.6
5th	Lucy Vaamonde	Cal State East Bay Pioneers	14.7
6th	Barbara Pickel	Cal State East Bay Pioneers	15.0

200 m hurdles
Pl.	Name	Team	Mark
1st place, gold medalist(s)	Pat Hawkins	LIU Brooklyn Blackbirds	27.2
2nd place, silver medalist(s)	Donna Schulenberg	Illinois Fighting Illini	28.2
3rd place, bronze medalist(s)	Kathi Guiney	Dean Bulldogs	28.5
4th	Gail Boyd	Western Oregon Wolves	28.6
5th	Marti Ogilvie	Flathead Valley Mountainettes	28.0
6th	Lynae Larson	Dickinson State Blue Hawks	29.0

High jump
Pl.	Name	Team	Mark
1st place, gold medalist(s)	Audrey Reid	Texas Woman's Pioneers	5 ft 8 in (1.72 m)
2nd place, silver medalist(s)	Donna Schulenberg	Illinois Fighting Illini	5 ft 2 in (1.57 m)
3rd place, bronze medalist(s)	Mary Lalum	Flathead Valley Mountainettes	5 ft 0 in (1.52 m)
4th	Shirley Lagestree	Oregon State Beavers	5 ft 0 in (1.52 m)
5th	Neysa Miller	Bridgewater State Bears	5 ft 0 in (1.52 m)
6th	Carol Akmerman	Texas Woman's Pioneers	4 ft 10 in (1.47 m)

Long jump
Pl.	Name	Team	Mark
1st place, gold medalist(s)	Brenda Bryan	Texas Tech Red Raiders	18 ft 5 3/4 in (5.63 m)
2nd place, silver medalist(s)	Marilyn King	Cal State East Bay Pioneers	18 ft 5 in (5.61 m)
3rd place, bronze medalist(s)	Alexis Crawford	TCNJ Lions	17 ft 8 1/4 in (5.39 m)
4th	Lucy Vaamonde	Cal State East Bay Pioneers	17 ft 6 in (5.33 m)
5th	Jo Meaker	West Texas A&M Buffaloes	17 ft 5 1/4 in (5.31 m)
6th	Karen Aufdenhaar	Texas State Bobcats	17 ft 2 3/4 in (5.25 m)

Shot put
Pl.	Name	Team	Mark
1st place, gold medalist(s)	Maren Seidler	Cal State East Bay Pioneers	52 ft 0 1/4 in (15.85 m)
2nd place, silver medalist(s)	Mary Jacobson	Kansas Jayhawks	48 ft 1 1/2 in (14.66 m)
3rd place, bronze medalist(s)	Lynnette Matthews	Seattle Pacific Falcons	47 ft 5 1/2 in (14.46 m)
4th	Denise Wood	Montclair State Red Hawks	45 ft 11 1/2 in (14 m)
5th	Rene Kesler	Flathead Valley Mountainettes	39 ft 9 3/4 in (12.13 m)
6th	Lynn Cannon	Chico State Wildcats	38 ft 6 1/2 in (11.74 m)

Discus throw
Pl.	Name	Team	Mark
1st place, gold medalist(s)	Denise Wood	Montclair State Red Hawks	142 ft 4 in (43.38 m)
2nd place, silver medalist(s)	Lynnette Matthews	Seattle Pacific Falcons	136 ft 11 1/2 in (41.74 m)
3rd place, bronze medalist(s)	Rene Kesler	Flathead Valley Mountainettes	130 ft 10 in (39.87 m)
4th	Carol Knight	Cal State East Bay Pioneers	129 ft 2 1/2 in (39.38 m)
5th	Lynn Cannon	Chico State Wildcats	122 ft 6 1/2 in (37.35 m)
6th	Maren Seidler	Cal State East Bay Pioneers	120 ft 0 1/2 in (36.58 m)

Javelin throw
Pl.	Name	Team	Mark
1st place, gold medalist(s)	Sherry Calvert	USC Trojans	192 ft 0 in (58.52 m)
2nd place, silver medalist(s)	Lynn Cannon	Chico State Wildcats	156 ft 10 1/2 in (47.81 m)
3rd place, bronze medalist(s)	Diane Franklin	Montana Western Bulldogs	151 ft 6 in (46.17 m)
4th	Laura Gibbons	Florida State Seminoles	138 ft 1 1/2 in (42.1 m)
5th	Cheryl Patterson	Western Oregon Wolves	152 ft 5 1/2 in (46.46 m)
6th	Ginny Walker	Texas Woman's Pioneers	126 ft 8 1/4 in (38.61 m)

4 × 110 yards relay
Pl.	Name	Team	Mark
1st place, gold medalist(s)	Pat Lopez	Cal State East Bay Pioneers	50.0
1st place, gold medalist(s)	Marilyn King	Cal State East Bay Pioneers	50.0
1st place, gold medalist(s)	Barbara Pickel	Cal State East Bay Pioneers	50.0
1st place, gold medalist(s)	Lessie Johnson	Cal State East Bay Pioneers	50.0
2nd place, silver medalist(s)		Texas Woman's Pioneers 'X'	50.1
3rd place, bronze medalist(s)		Oregon State Beavers	50.2
4th		Texas Woman's Pioneers 'Y'	50.8
5th		Northwest Missouri State Bearcats	51.4
6th		Tennessee Volunteers	52.1

Sprint medley relay (Note: Held at a total distance of 880 yards, with the first leg running 220 yards, the middle two legs running 110 yards, and the anchor leg running 440 yards.)
Pl.	Name	Team	Mark
1st place, gold medalist(s)	Lessie Johnson	Cal State East Bay Pioneers	1:52.7
1st place, gold medalist(s)	Pat Lopez	Cal State East Bay Pioneers	1:52.7
1st place, gold medalist(s)	Marilyn King	Cal State East Bay Pioneers	1:52.7
1st place, gold medalist(s)	Lucy Vaamonde	Cal State East Bay Pioneers	1:52.7
2nd place, silver medalist(s)		Flathead Valley Mountainettes	1:53.4
3rd place, bronze medalist(s)		Western Washington Vikings	1:55.0
4th		Texas Woman's Pioneers 'Y'	1:55.4
5th		West Texas A&M Buffaloes	1:56.7
6th		Western Oregon Wolves	1:56.8

== See also ==
- Association for Intercollegiate Athletics for Women championships § Outdoor track and field
- 1972 NCAA Division I Outdoor Track and Field Championships
