= Christine Babcock =

American distance runner

Personal information
- Full name: Christine Babcock
- Nationality: United States
- Born: Laguna Hills, California

Sport
- Sport: Track and Field
- Event(s): 800 meters, 1500 meters, 1600 meters

Christine Babcock (born 19 May 1990) is an American former long-distance runner. She is an Oiselle professional athlete and competed in the US Olympic Trials in Eugene, Oregon as a high school athlete. She set two national high school records at the distances of 1500 and 1600 meters respectively. Running for the Washington Huskies track and field program, she was a two-time All-American collegiate athlete. She represented the United States internationally at the 2015 Pan American Cross Country Cup, where she won the team gold medal.

== Early life and education ==
Babcock was born in Laguna Hills, California. Her parents met at a running club and her mother, Kelly Babcock, competed in the 1984 U.S. Olympic Marathon Trials. Christine is the middle of three daughters.

Christine attended Woodbridge High School in Irvine, California. She graduated at the University of Washington in 2013.

== Athletic career ==
=== High school ===
Babcock's first major victory in track and field came by winning the girls' 2006 outdoor 1600 meter CIF California State Meet title in 4:41.29 (with a margin of over 1 second) as a sophomore.

During the following cross country season, she won the CIF Division II State Championships by 13 second with a time of 17:20. In the spring she won her second straight 1600 meter state title in 4:38.85, a new California Interscholastic Federation Record at the time.

In her senior year, Babcock again won the State cross country Division II title, this time in the fastest time of the meet, 17:04. In 2008 track, she won her third straight CIF state meet by 16 seconds in the 1600 meters, was a national high school record of 4:33.82 until 2014 when Alexa Efraimson ran faster at the Washington State meet. Additionally, she won the Mt. SAC Relays 1500 meter race in 4:16.42, at the time a national record. This allowed her to qualify for the 2008 Olympic Trials. Her record would later be broken by Jordan Hasay at the 2008 US Olympic trials in a time of 4:14.50.

=== College ===
In the 2008 cross country season, Babcock led the University of Washington to the program's first NCAA championship. She was the first finisher for the Huskies, at seventh place overall, with a time of 20:02. In track, she set a personal best time of 4:15.10 in the 1500 meters at the NCAA National Championship preliminaries. She later went on to finish 11th in the finals.

2009 led to another All-American performance in cross country, with Babcock finishing 34th nationally. Her team finished 3rd nationally. She also placed fifth in the Pac-10 Conference championships.

In January 2010 Babcock stopped running due to an injury in her right foot. Her athletic hiatus lasted seven months. She then missed the 2011 season due to an Achilles tendon injury.

On November 30, 2011, she was named the "Pac-12 Scholar Athlete Of The Year" with a 3.93 grade point average.

Year	Competition	Place	Event
2008	U.S. Olympic Trials	18th	1500m
2008	Pac-10 XC	3rd	(3rd UW)
2008	NCAA Regional XC	3rd	(1st UW)
2008	NCAA XC	7th	(1st UW) (All-America)
2009	MPSF TF	2nd	Mile
2009	MPSF TF	1st	DMR (MPSF Champion)
2009	NCAA Indoors	8th	DMR (All-America)
2009	Pac-10 TF	3rd	800m
2009	NCAA Regional TF	7th	1500m
2009	NCAA Outdoors	11th	1500m
2009	Pac-10 XC	5th	(3rd UW)
2009	NCAA Regional XC	10th	(5th UW)
2009	NCAA XC	34th	(4th UW) (All-America)
2010	Pac-10 XC	19th	(5th UW)
2010	Regional XC	19th	(3rd UW)
2010	NCAA XC	114th	(4th UW)
2011	Pac-12 XC	12th	(2nd UW)
2011	Regional XC	14th	(5th UW)
2011	NCAA XC	62nd	(3rd UW)
2012	MPSF TF	8th	3000m
2012	Pac-12 TF	7th	5000m
2012	NCAA Prelims TF	14th	1500m
2013	MPSF TF	3rd	3000m
2013	MPSF TF	1st	DMR (MPSF Champion)
2013	NCAA Indoors	13th	Mile (All-America Second Team)
2013	Pac-12 TF	11th	1500m
2013	NCAA Prelims TF	7th	5000m
2013	NCAA Outdoors	11th	5000m (All-America Second Team)
2013	USA Outdoor Champs	11th	5000m

=== Professional ===
Beginning in 2013, Babcock was sponsored by Oiselle and trained under coach Lauren Fleshman in Bend, Oregon. She is now retired from professional running and is working in the medical field.

2015 Boulder USA Cross Country Championships Christine Babcock placed 13th.

Year	Competition	Venue	Position	Event	Notes
2015	USA Cross Country Senior	Flatirons Golf Course, Boulder, Colorado	13th	8000 m	29:06
2015	Pan American Cross Country	Avenida al Río Golf Course, Barranquilla, Colombia	9th	7000 m	22:03

== Personal life ==
Babcock is a Christian.

== Performance at select events ==
Competition	Result	Time	Distance	Location	Date
2006 CIF State Championships	1st	4:41.29	1600 m	Cerritos	2006–6–3
2006 CIF State Championships	1st	17:20	5000 m	Fresno	2006-11-25
2007 CIF State Championships	1st	4:38.85	1600 m	Sacramento	2007–6–2
2007 CIF State Championships	1st	17:04	5000 m	Fresno	2007-11-24
2008 CIF State Championships	1st	4:33.82 NR	1600 m	Cerritos	2008–5–31
Mt. SAC High Performance Challenge	1st	4:16.42	1500 m	Walnut	2008–6–15

== Personal bests ==
Distance	Mark	Date	Location
800 m	2:06.55	2009-04-11	Tempe, Arizona
1,500 m	4:16.10	2009-05-23	NCAA prelims
1,600 m	4:33.82	2008-05-31	Cerritos, California
