= Doug Lytle =

American pole vaulter

Doug Lytle (born 7 August 1962) is a retired American pole vaulter.

He was born in Kansas City, Missouri. He finished sixth at the 1984 Olympic Games and eighth at the 1987 World Indoor Championships. His personal best jump was 5.72 metres, achieved in April 1986, in Lawrence, Kansas.

Competing for the Kansas State Wildcats track and field team, Lytle won the 1982 pole vault at the NCAA Division I Indoor Track and Field Championships with a jump of 5.43 meters.
