= Metric mile =

Informal term

A metric mile is a colloquial term used in sports to refer to 1500 or 1600 meters. It is most commonly used in track running, speed skating and swimming. The term is used in some countries for the 1500 meters, the premier middle distance running event in international track and field. The race is also called an "Olympic mile." The term 'metric mile' (0.93 statute miles) was applied to this distance because it approximates one statute mile (1609.344 m).

Even in countries such as the U.S, which do not embrace the metric system, most running tracks now have a lap distance of 400 meters in the innermost lane. The final leg of a distance medley relay uses a four-lap 1600 m leg; The standard middle distance in many United States high school competitions is 1600 meters and this distance is sometimes referred to as a metric mile as well.

In swimming, the 1500 meters (1640 yards) race is commonly referred to as "the swimmer's mile", and is often the longest distance swum by competitors in a pool. The standard distance triathlon also employs the swimmer's mile, except that it is in open water instead of in a pool.

== History ==
In track running, the 1500 m race became the standard middle distance race in Europe in the late 19th century, and has been the standard distance in the Olympic Games since 1896.

Prior to metrication, many tracks in the United States and the Commonwealth of Nations were constructed to the specifications of one quarter of a mile, 440 yards (402.336 m). Thus when the mile was run, the race was a four lap race. The Commonwealth Games officially converted to metric in the mid-1960s. The United States adopted metric rules in the mid to late 1970s, though some tracks are still constructed to be a quarter of a mile in length requiring calibrated painted lines to run metric races.

== See also ==
- Metric foot
- Metrication
