= Mike Bradley (sprinter) =

American sprinter (born 1961)

Mike Bradley (born February 27, 1961) is an American former sprinter. He set a collegiate record in the 600 meters in December 1983 in Saskatoon, Saskatchewan. His personal Record of 45.34 seconds for the 400 meters was set at the 1983 TAC Meet in Indianapolis, Indiana. He was a two-time Big 8 Champion at 600 yards. His Big 8 record of 1:08.89 was set in February 1983. he was the Kansas State High School Champion in the 100, 200 and 400 meters in 1979.; all in state record times. He was a Class 1A State Player of the Year in basketball, averaging over 25 points per game. He was a member of the 4×400 meter relay team that won a gold medal at the 1983 Pan Am Games, setting a Pan Am Games record for the event of 3:00.47.

Bradley was an All-American sprinter for the Kansas State Wildcats track and field team, finishing 3rd in the 600 yards at the 1983 NCAA Indoor Track and Field Championships.
