= Scott Sellers =

American high jumper

Personal information
- Nationality: American
- Born: August 16, 1986 (age 39)
- Education: Kansas State
- Years active: 2005-?
- Height: 6 ft 2 in (188 cm)
- Weight: 170 lb (77 kg; 12 st 2 lb)

Sport
- Sport: Track and field
- Position: High jumper

Scott Michael Sellers (born August 16, 1986) is an American track and field athlete who holds records in the high jump. His clearance of 7-07.75 is currently 4th in NCAA history and 15th in U.S. history. As a high schooler, Sellers broke the national indoor record with a jump of 2.27m in Landover, Maryland. Sellers attended and competed for Kansas State University in Manhattan, Kansas.

Sellers won the 2007 Big 12 championships with a jump of 2.33m. This accomplishment is the fourth highest jump in NCAA history. Sellers followed up his performance by capturing the Midwest Regional title with a jump of 2.25m. A mere two weeks after securing a Regional title, Sellers ascended to the status of Division I National Champion by triumphing over a highly skilled field, achieving a jump of 2.32m on his second attempt.

In 2009, Sellers won gold in both the NCAA Indoor and Outdoor Championships. These two wins gave Sellers his 7th and 8th All-American honors in the same event, a feat accomplished by a select few in NCAA history.

At the end of 2009 Sellers was named the high school high jump athlete of the decade by ESPN and USAToday.
