= Tom Sinclair =

Personal information
- Born: 1958 (age 67–68) Redmond, Washington, United States

Sport
- Sport: Track and field

Tom Sinclair (born 1958) was the 1979 NCAA Division I national champion for the javelin throw . He competed for the University of Washington. At Washington, Sinclair was a multi-year All-American. Tom Sinclair also holds the Washington state high school (WIAA) record for the javelin throw at 239-1.

After a second-place finish at Pac-10s, and fourth at the NCAA Championships during his junior year, in Sinclair's senior season he was the Pac-10 champion and went on to win the 1979 NCAA championship with a throw of 261-3, which, at the time, was the University of Illinois stadium record.

Tom Sinclair set the Washington state javelin record in 1975, competing for the Peninsula High School Seahawks, in a dual meet against Curtis High School. The record still stands due to rule changes that altered the quality of the javelin' s flight to prevent the implement from traveling as far.
