= Nathan Green (runner) =

American middle-distance runner (born 2003)

Personal information
- Born: April 10, 2003 (age 23) Boise, Idaho, United States
- Education: University of Washington; Borah High School

Sport
- Sport: Track and field
- Events: 1500 m, mile
- University team: Washington Huskies
- Coached by: Andy Powell

Nathan Green (born April 10, 2003) is an American middle-distance runner who specializes in the 1500 metres. He competed for the Washington Huskies. He is a two-time national champion, winning the 1500 m title at the 2023 NCAA Outdoor Track and Field Championships and at the 2025 NCAA Outdoor Track and Field Championships.

== Athletics career ==
=== High school ===
Competing for Borah High School in his hometown of Boise, Idaho, Green was a nine-time Idaho state champion and five-time Gatorade Idaho Athlete of the year in cross country and track and field.

In 2021, his senior year, he won the Brooks PR Invitational setting a meet record of 4:01.76, less than a second off of his 4:00.76 personal best from earlier that year. Just two days after his Brooks PR win, he won the mile at Nike Outdoor Nationals at Hayward Field. He graduated holding Idaho state records in the mile, 2 miles, and 5000 m.

=== College ===
In 2021, Green enrolled at the University of Washington, joining the Washington Huskies cross country and track and field teams.

==== 2022 ====
In his freshman year, he finished seventh at the NCAA Outdoor Championships in the 1500 m in June. Later that month, he won the USA U20 1500 m title. His USA U20 win qualified him to represent the United States at the 2022 World U20 Championships in Cali, Colombia, where he finished fifth.

==== 2023 ====
In January 2023, he ran a mile personal best of 3:52.76 in Seattle, one of eight University of Washington runners who ran under 4 minutes in that race. Competing at the NCAA Indoor Championships, he finished fifth in the mile.

In May, Green claimed the Pac-12 1500 m title and went on to win the 1500 m at the NCAA Outdoor Championships the following month, finishing just ahead of Washington teammate and defending champion Joe Waskom. In July, Green finished seventh at the USA Championships, running a 1500 m personal best of 3:36.29.

==== 2024 ====
After setting a Washington 800 m school record of 1:46.50 in February 2024, Green chose to contest the 800 m at the NCAA Indoor Championships, where he failed to advance to the final.

In April, Green ran a 1500 m personal best of 3:34.79 in California, a Washington school record and the fourth fastest time in collegiate history.

In June, Green finished fifth in the 1500 m finals of the United States Olympic trials with a personal record time of 3:32.20.

==== 2025 ====
In May, Green finished 2nd in the 1500 m at the Big-10 Outdoor Championships and went on to win the 1500 m at the NCAA Outdoor Championships for the 2nd time in his college career, finishing just ahead of North Carolina's Ethan Strand, the 2025 NCAA Indoor 3000 m champion.

On July 1, 2025 Green announced via an Instagram post that he had signed a professional contract with adidas, training in Seattle, Washington under his collegiate coach Andy Powell.

=== Professional ===
In March, Green ran 3:37.65 to secure his first national title at the 2026 USATF Indoor Championship.

== Personal bests ==
Surface	Event	Mark	Date	Venue
Indoor	800	1:47.68	February 16, 2024	Randal Tyson Indoor Center; Fayetteville, AR
Indoor	1,000	2:18.56	February 4, 2024	The Track at New Balance; Boston, MA
Indoor	1,500	3:34.91	March 7, 2026	Ott Center for Track and Field; Philadelphia, PA
Indoor	Mile	3:53.25	February 26, 2023	Boston University Track & Tennis Center; Boston, MA
Indoor	3,000	7:40.09	December 7, 2024	Boston University Track & Tennis Center; Boston, MA
Outdoor	800	1:45.58	June 4, 2026	Stadio Olimpico; Rome, ITA
Outdoor	1,500	3:32.20	June 24, 2024	Hayward Field; Eugene, OR
Outdoor	Mile	3:48.05	July 18, 2026	London Stadium; London, GBR
