= Ja'Warren Hooker =

American sprinter (born 1978)

Personal information
- Nationality: United States
- Born: September 24, 1978 (age 47) Chicago, Illinois, U.S.
- Height: 5 ft 11 in (1.80 m)
- Weight: 165 lb (75 kg)

Sport
- Sport: Running
- Event: Sprints
- College team: Washington Huskies

Achievements and titles
- Personal bests: 100 m: 10.18; 400 m: 44.78
Medal record
Men's athletics
Representing the United States
Pan American Games
Silver medal – second place	2003 Santo Domingo	4×400 m relay
Pan American Junior Championships
Gold medal – first place	1997 Havana	100 m
- Updated on 30 April 2012

Ja'Warren Hooker (born September 24, 1978), is a track and field sprinter and former football player at University of Washington,

Hooker is one of the children who was born in Chicago and played halfback for Ellensburg High School. His high school football career record achieved at 20 touchdowns totaling a distance over 5,100 yards. Hooker also played basketball for his high school, with an accuracy of 40% at the point range of 3, Hooker later ran track field and played football at the University of Washington. Hooker was raised by his step father, who is a chemist for Agriculture department at Washington State,

== High school career ==
In 1995, Hooker won the 100 meters race in 10.71s as a Sophomore in high school to win in his first appearance at the Pasco Invitational.

The following year, Hooker returned to the Pasco Invitational to win the sprint double in the 100 m (10.68s) and 200 m (21.82s). His final chance to compete at the Pasco Invitational was not wasted as he won another sprint double. Hooker won the 100 meters in 10.44s, a meet record time, and won the 200 meters in 21.40s, also a meet record. Hooker has the Washington High School State Record for the 100 meters with a time of 10.27s.

== Career highlights ==
Hooker made the 2000 Olympic relay team as a back-up member, but he did not get to compete. Before this Hooker was the 1997 USA Junior Champion in the 100 meters. Hooker has personal all time bests of 10.18s for the 100m dash and 44.78s for the 400m dash.

== Post Running Career ==
Hooker co-founded Stretch 22 with Dr. Kris Sasaki in 2018. Stretch 22 is an assisted stretching studio with four locations in the greater Seattle area.
