= Phil Shinnick =

American track and field athlete

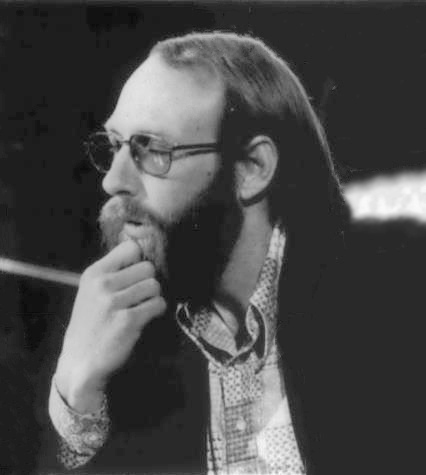
- Phil Shinnick in 1973.

Personal information
- Born: April 21, 1943 (age 83) Spokane, Washington, U.S.
- Height: 190 cm (6 ft 3 in)
- Weight: 82 kg (181 lb)

Sport
- Sport: Athletics
- Events: Sprint, hurdles, high jump, long jump, triple jump
- Club: Washington Huskies, Seattle

Achievements and titles
- Personal bests: 100 m – 10.5 (1967); 110 mH – 15.1 (1966); HJ – 2.12 m (1966); LJ – 8.33 m (1963); TJ – 14.42 m (1964)

Phillip Kent Shinnick (born April 21, 1943) is an American track and field athlete, known primarily for the long jump. He represented the United States at the 1964 Olympics. He qualified for the Olympics by finishing third at the 1964 United States Olympic Trials, where winner Ralph Boston set the world record of 8.34 m (27 ft 4 1/4 in), to beat the 8.31 m of Igor Ter-Ovanesyan set two years earlier and equalled by Boston a month earlier. However, on May 25, 1963, Shinnick jumped 27 ft 4 in (8.33 m) at the 1963 Modesto Relays more than a year earlier. Shinnick was credited with beating Boston at that meet, but a wind reading was not taken on Shinnick's jump. So in effect, had the jump been officiated properly and the wind legal, Boston should have been beating Shinnick's mark. Boston had problems with the wind himself. He jumped 8.49 m (27 ft 10 1/4 in) to win the trials, but that jump was wind aided. Boston added another centimeter to the record at the 1965 Modesto Relays.

When Shinnick jumped his 27'4" there was only one wind gauge at the meet. Shinnick was a jumper for the University of Washington, not expected to be setting a record. At the same time he was jumping on the west runway, the wind gauge was measuring a legal +1.6 mps for the 220 yard hurdles on the same west straightaway.

“They didn’t know who I was. Ralph [Boston] told me later ‘when I saw that jump, I went into shock. I just was absolutely in shock.’ And I think that the track world never recovered from that shock. They couldn’t believe the unbelievable. How could a guy who’s just twenty-years-old, and jumped in only four or five college meets in his life, break the world record?”

Meet officials voted to submit the mark as a world record, but it was not accepted by the IAAF, the world governing body. On January 20, 2016, the President of the University of Washington and Athletic Director Cohen sent a letter to Sebastian Coe, President of the IAAF. "For reasons that have never been explained to any relevant parties, the IAAF did not respond to the request for recognition as a World Record within the appropriate time-frame, and Mr. Shinnick was left with no avenue of appeal. We ask that you review and correct this injustice. " Federation disputes go to outside arbitration but the IAAF time barred this recognition so far.

“First of all it wasn’t a wind. It wasn’t even a breeze… Whatever it was, it wasn’t enough to blow out a match…even a hummingbird’s feather would have dropped to the ground without drifting in its descent at the moment young Shinnick made his phenomenal jump.”

— Arthur Robinson, Sacramento Bee

Shinnick grew up to become an Acupuncturist and mind mapping research scientist in Manhattan. For forty years he waged a battle to get his record recognized, enlisting the support of Olympic Gold Medallists Lee Evans, Tommie Smith, Hal Connolly, and Bob Beamon. He has affidavits from virtually every person involved. He has had expert wind analysis of film of the jump done.

“I saw the attempt and it was real.”

— Ralph Boston

"There is no reason in the world why the record shouldn't be recognized, I was right there and can testify there was hardly any wind."

— Hilmer Lodge, meet official

“I have regretted this happening all these years, also as I have always felt that the wind was under the allowable and you should have a world record.”

— Tom Moore, Modesto Relays meet director i 1995

Shinnick's minor victory came when United States Track and Field recognized his mark as the American record for that point in time, in December 2003. IAAF has changed records based on affidavits in the past and has changed historical records when new information is available.

Shinnick's 8.33m mark was retroactively declared a world record by World Athletics (formerly IAAF) in 2021 and at that year's United States Olympic Trials he was presented a world record plaque from Mike Powell, the current long jump world record holder.

Shinnick continued jumping, finishing fourth in the 1968 Olympic Trials 26' 6 1/2", and injured in 1972 and did not jump in 1976. After his time at the University of Washington, he jumped for the United States Air Force. He received his PhD from the University of California, Berkeley. He accepted an assistant professorship at Rutgers in 1972 and assistant clinical professor at New York Medical college in the 1990s.

Shinnick has spent his life as a peaceful political activist. He is the founder of Athletes United for Peace and the Moscow Peace Marathon. He was elected into the University of Washington Sports Hall of Fame in 1992. Shinnick has written for The New York Times, Sovietski Sport, New China, Runner's World and in many scientific journals. He is an Ambassador of UNESCO and has a New York License in Chinese Medicine.

Sporting positions
Preceded by (Soviet Union) Igor Ter-Ovanesyan	Men's Long Jump Best Year Performance; 1963	Succeeded by (United States) Ralph Boston
