= Ryann Krais =

American World Youth Championship medalist in track & field (born 1990)

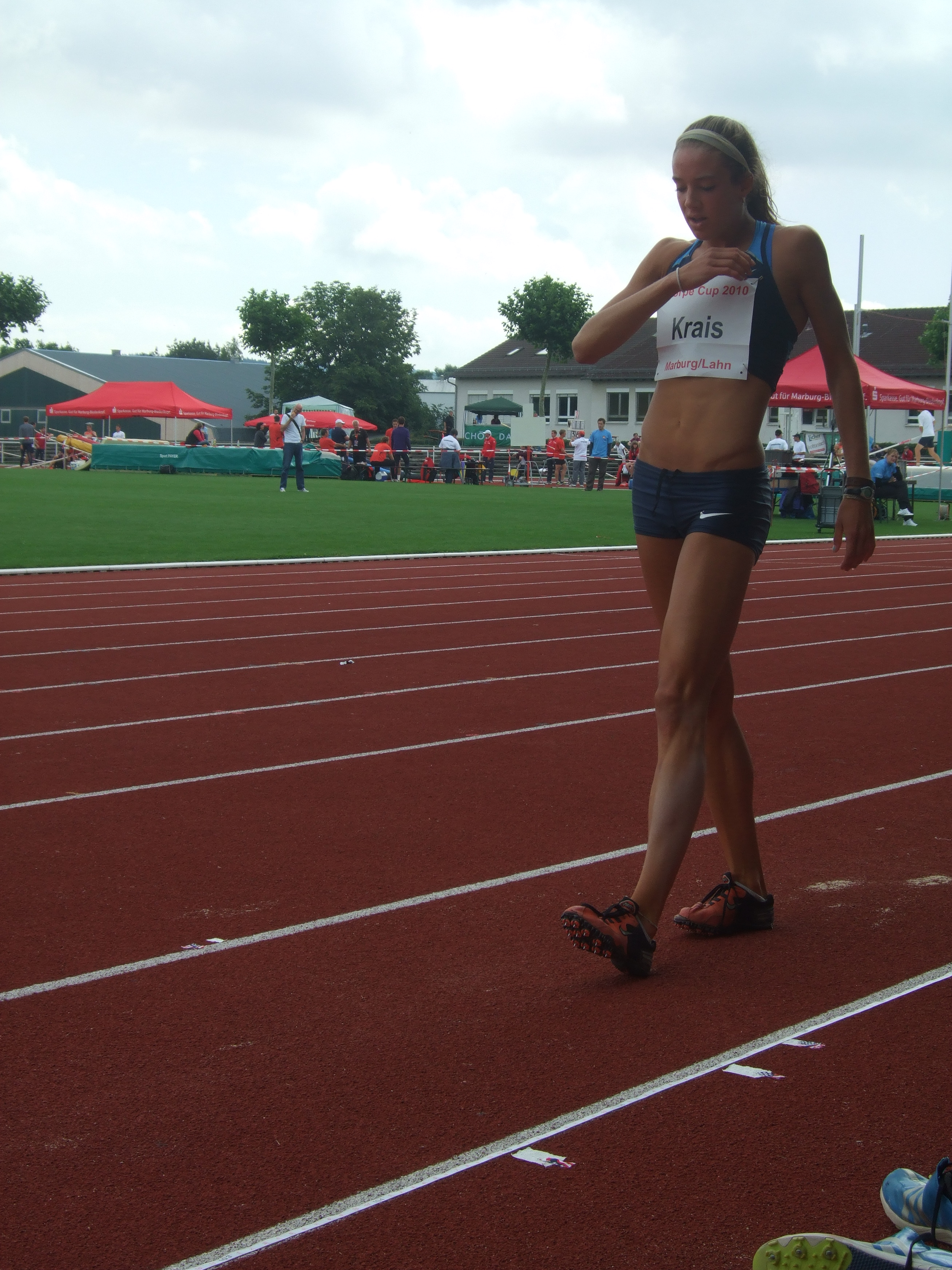
- Krais in 2010

Personal information
- Full name: Ryann Krais Hierholzer
- Born: March 21, 1990 (age 36) Philadelphia, Pennsylvania, U.S.
- Height: 5 ft 9 in (175 cm)
- Website: altis.world/athletes/ryann-krais-hierholzer/

Sport
- Country: United States
- Sport: Athletics
- Event: Heptathlon
- Club: ALTIS World

Achievements and titles
- Personal bests: 200 m: 24.41 (Des Moines, June 2011); 800 m: 2:08.96 (Eugene, June 2011); 100 m hurdles: 13.50 (Columbia, April 2008); 400 m hurdles: 55.68 (Des Moines, June 2011); High jump: 1.78 (Des Moines, June 2011); Long jump: 5.99 (Eugene, June 2011); Shot put: 12.21 (Eugene, June 2011); Javelin: 40.75 (Marburg, August 2010); Heptathlon: 6030 (Eugene, June 2011)
Medal record
Women's athletics
Representing United States
World Youth Championships
Gold medal – first place	2007 Ostrava	Medley relay
Bronze medal – third place	2007 Ostrava	400 m hurdles
Pan American Junior Championships
Silver medal – second place	2009 Port-of-Spain	Heptathlon

Ryann Krais (born March 21, 1990) is an American athlete. She is a gold and bronze medalist from the 2007 World Youth Championships.

== Early life and education ==
Ryann Krais was born in Philadelphia, Pennsylvania, on March 21, 1990, the daughter of John and Janelle Krais. Her father is an engineer and her mother is a Lutheran pastor. She has two siblings, one brother (J.J. Krais) and one sister (Julie Krais). She is a 2008 graduate of Methacton High School in Norristown, Pennsylvania, where she was a nine-time outdoor state champion and a five-time indoor state champion.

Krais graduated from Kansas State University in Manhattan, Kansas, in 2012.

== Career ==
Ryann finished 12th 2014 USA Outdoor Track and Field Championships scoring 5549 points.

Krais finished 4th 2013 USATF Senior Women's Heptathlon scoring 5957 points.

Krais finished 7th in the 2012 Olympic Trials.

Krais is the 2011 NCAA champion in the Heptathlon, and also placed third in the 400 hurdles. She is a seven-time collegiate All-American, and four-time conference champion. At the 2011 USA Outdoor Track & Field Championships, Krais finished second in the heptathlon with a points total of 6030, finishing behind Sharon Day. She has also been recognized for her academic accomplishments as well.

Krais is a two time US Junior champion in the Heptathlon in 2008 and 2009.

At the 2009 Pan American Junior Athletics Championships, Krais won a silver medal in the heptathlon, finishing behind Vanessa Spinola of Brazil.

A year later, at the 2008 World Junior Championships in Athletics in Bydgoszcz, Krais placed 9th in the heptathlon with 5457 points. Krais then went on to compete at the 2008 Olympic Trials in the 400 m hurdles. However, she did not advance past the heats.

At the 2007 World Youth Championships in Athletics in Ostrava, Krais was a member of the gold medal winning medley team. She also won a bronze medal in the 400 m hurdles.
