= Mike Ramos (decathlete) =

American decathlete

Personal information
- Born: November 1, 1962 (age 63)
Medal record
Men's athletics
Representing United States
Summer Universiade
Gold medal – first place	1985 Kobe	Decathlon

Michael Anthony Ramos (born November 1, 1962) is a retired decathlete who competed for the United States during his career. He set his personal best in the event (8322 points) on May 20, 1986, at the NCAA Championships in Los Angeles which remained an NCAA record for 14 years. Mike competed at the University of Washington from 1981 to 1986. He is the 1986 NCAA Champion. He is the 1983 National Sports Festival Champion held in Colorado Springs, CO. He is a 3-time Pac-10 Champion for 1983, 1984 and 1986. He is also the current Pac12 record holder.

Mike Ramos is now in his 23rd year of ownership and operation of Paul's Pancake Parlor, a popular family restaurant, in Missoula, Montana.
