= Connie Teaberry =

American high jumper (born 1970)

Personal information
- Born: August 15, 1970 (age 56) St. Louis, Missouri, United States

Sport
- Sport: Track and field

Condinitha "Connie" Teaberry-Lindsey (born August 15, 1970) is an American track and field athlete known for the high jump. She represented the United States at the 1996 Olympics, where she finished 18th. She set her personal best of 1.95 m (6 ft 4 3/4 in) in the 1996 Olympic Trials.

She was an NCAA finalist outdoors four straight years and indoors in 1990 and 1992. In 1996, Teaberry was an assistant coach for the Toledo Rockets track and field team. She had previously competed for Kansas State where she was coached by Cliff Rovelto. In 2016, she was inducted into the Kansas State Hall of Fame. She previously jumped for Lutheran High School North in St. Louis and had been high jumping since sixth grade. Connie was inducted into the St. Louis Sports Hall of Fame May 31, 2018 for her accomplishments. Condinitha 'Connie' Teaberry-Lindsey is married to DeMarcus K. Lindsey. The couple have two children Kameron M. Lindsey, and Kollan T. Lindsey.

She is now the Director of Cross Country, Track and Field Coach at Northern Illinois University. Connie has served on three USA teams as the Women’s Jumps and Combine Events Coach; 2019 NACAC U23 Championships in Queretaro, Mexico, 2023 World Athletics Indoor Championships in Glasgow, Scotland, and the 2025 World Athletics Championships in Tokyo, Japan.
