= Miles Batty =

American middle-distance runner (born 1987)

Personal information
- Nationality: American
- Born: June 4, 1987 (age 39) Salt Lake City, Utah, U.S.

Sport
- Sport: Track
- Events: 1500 metres, Mile
- College team: BYU

Achievements and titles
- Personal bests: 1500 metres: 3:36.25; Indoor Mile: 3:54.54

Miles Batty (born June 4, 1987) is an American former track athlete who specialized in middle-distance disciplines. In high school, he was one of the most prolific cross country and distance track runners in the state of Utah. Competing for BYU, Batty earned eight first-team All-American awards, two NCAA championships, broke the NCAA record in the indoor mile, and contributed to BYU's track team successes. After graduating from BYU, he finished 10th at the 2012 US Olympic Trials for the 1500-meter race and went on to compete professionally through a sponsorship contract with ASICS.

== Running career ==
=== High school ===
Batty attended and ran for Jordan High School until he graduated in 2005. In addition to being state champion of Utah in cross country, his personal best in the mile as a high schooler was 4:22.

=== Collegiate ===
Right after high school, Batty went on a two-year mission to Brazil, during which he did not participate in any competitive running.. Upon his return to BYU, he struggled to get into shape and even questioned the chances of himself succeeding as a college runner.

In February 2012 at the 2012 Millrose Games, Batty broke the indoor collegiate mile record by almost half a second with a time of 3:54.54. His record time was beaten in February 2013 at the 2013 Millrose Games by Chris O'Hare with a time of 3:52.98. Batty dropped to number three on the NCAA all-time mile list in 2014 when Lawi Lalang clocked a 3:52.88, also at the Millrose Games.

After qualifying and winning at NCAA's track championship, Batty was named National Men's Track Athlete of the Year by USATF in 2011, and also helped BYU's distance relay team win the national championship. As of August 2011, he was ranked number 9 in the United States in the 1500 meters discipline.

=== Awards and honors ===
- 2018 West Coast Conference Hall of Honor Inductee
- 2013 NCAA Today's Top 10 Award
- 2012 NCAA Walter Byers Scholarship
- 2-Time NCAA Champion
- 8-Time NCAA First Team All-American
- 2011 NCAA Indoor Track Athlete of the Year
- 2011 USA Track & Field Athlete of the Week

=== Top Performances ===
Year	Competition	Venue	Position	Event	Notes
2013	2013 USA Outdoor Track and Field Championships	Drake Stadium Des Moines, Iowa	8th	1500 metres	3:46.31
2012	2012 United States Olympic Trials (track and field)	Hayward Field, University of Oregon	10th	1500 metres	3:43.58
2012	2012 NCAA Men's Division I Outdoor Track and Field Championships	Drake Stadium Des Moines, Iowa	2nd	1500 metres	3:43.83
2012	2012 NCAA Men's Division I Indoor Track and Field Championships	Jacksons Indoor Track Nampa, Idaho	3rd	Mile	4:01.86
2012	2012 NCAA Men's Division I Indoor Track and Field Championships	Jacksons Indoor Track Nampa, Idaho	3rd	Distance Medley Relay	9:36.07
2012	2012 Millrose Games	The Armory, Washington Heights, Manhattan, New York City	2nd	Mile	3:54.54
2011	2011 NCAA Division I Cross Country Championships	LaVern Gibson Championship Cross Country Course, Terre Haute, Indiana	14th	10k run	29:40.0
2011	2011 NCAA Men's Division I Indoor Track and Field Championships	Gilliam Indoor Track Stadium College Station, Texas	1st	Mile	3:59.49
2011	2011 NCAA Men's Division I Indoor Track and Field Championships	Gilliam Indoor Track Stadium College Station, Texas	1st	Distance Medley Relay	9:29.28
2011	2011 NCAA Division I Cross Country Championships	LaVern Gibson Championship Cross Country Course, Terre Haute, Indiana	15th	10k run	30:09.4
