= Scott Roth (athlete) =

American pole vaulter (born 1988)

Scott Roth (born June 25, 1988) is an American pole vaulter.

== Biography ==
Roth was educated at Granite Bay High School in Granite Bay, California.

Competing for the Washington Huskies track and field team, Roth won the 2011 NCAA Division I Outdoor Track and Field Championships in the pole vault.

Roth began competing in pole vault in January 2005, where he appeared at the Pole Vault Summit. In July of that year, he competed at the World Youth Championships and won the silver medal.

He was coached by his father, Curt Roth.

== Achievements ==
Year	Competition	Venue	Position	Notes
Representing United States
2005	World Youth Championships	Marrakesh, Morocco	2nd	5.25 m
2006	World Junior Championships	Beijing, China	13th	5.10 m
2007	Pan American Junior Championships	São Paulo, Brazil	1st	5.30 m
2012	World Indoor Championships	Istanbul, Turkey	—	NM
