= Joe Waskom =

American middle-distance runner (born 2001)

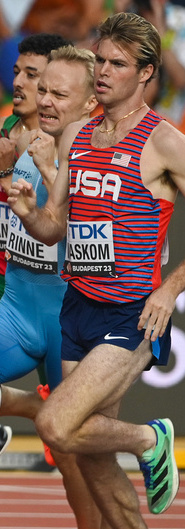
- Joe Waskom in 2023

Personal information
- Nationality: American
- Born: 12 April 2001 (age 25)

Sport
- Sport: Athletics
- Event: 1500m
- College team: Washington Huskies

Joe Waskom (born 12 April 2001) is an American professional middle-distance runner.

== Early life ==
From Snoqualmie, Washington he attended Mount Si High School.

== Career ==
Running for the Washington Huskies, Waskom initially competed as a steeplechaser. He won the NCAA Division I title in the 1500m in 2022.

Waskom finished second in the 1500m at the US national championships in July 2023 in Eugene, Oregon. That month he also set new personal best time of 3:34.64 in Lignano Sabbiadoro, Italy. He competed in the 1500m at the 2023 World Athletics Championships in Budapest in August 2023.

In 2024, Waskom won his second NCAA Division I Outdoor Track and Field Championships at 1500m. His win marked the fifth consecutive NCAA title won by a University of Washington man at the 1500m/mile distance.

In June 2024, Waskom debuted as a professional sponsored by Adidas at the United States Olympic trials. He finished seventh in the 1500 m finals with a personal best time of 3:33.74.

He reached the final of the 1500 metres at the 2025 USA Outdoor Track and Field Championships in Eugene, placing tenth overall.

On 1 March 2026, he was a finalist in the 800 metres at the 2026 USA Indoor Track and Field Championships, placing sixth overall.

== Personal bests ==
Surface	Event	Mark	Date	Venue
Indoor	1500	3:36.23	February 2, 2025	The Track at New Balance; Boston, MA
Indoor	Mile	3:55.18	February 2, 2025	Boston University Track & Tennis Center; Boston, MA
Indoor	3,000	7:46.62	December 7, 2024	Boston University Track & Tennis Center; Boston, MA
Outdoor	800	1:46.03	July 20, 2024	Keskusurheilukenttä; Joensuu, FIN
Outdoor	1,500	3:33.74	June 24, 2024	Hayward Field; Eugene, OR
Outdoor	Mile	3:51.90	January 28, 2023	Dempsey Indoor Center; Seattle, WA
Outdoor	3k Steeplechase	8:35.71	May 15, 2021	Katherine B. Loker Stadium; Los Angeles, CA
Outdoor	2 Mile	8:54.25	June 8, 2018	Shoreline, WA
Outdoor	5k	13:52.36	February 12, 2021	Dempsey Indoor Center; Seattle, WA
Road	5k	14:03	November 2, 2024	New York, NY
