= Marilyn King =

American pentathlete

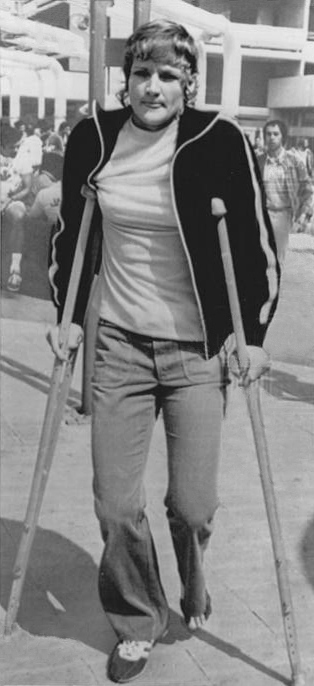
- King at the 1972 Olympics

Personal information
- Born: May 21, 1949 (age 77) Boston, Massachusetts, U.S.
- Height: 175 cm (5 ft 9 in)
- Weight: 70 kg (154 lb)

Sport
- Sport: Athletics
- Event: Pentathlon
- Club: Millbrae Lions

Achievements and titles
- Personal best(s): 100 mH – 13.7 (1976); HJ – 1.78 m (1976); LJ – 6.34 m (1976)

Marilyn Elizabeth King (born May 21, 1949) is an American former pentathlete. In 1971 she won the AAU title and placed fourth at the Pan American Games. She finished 17th at the 1976 Summer Olympics. At the 1972 Games King failed to complete her program due to an ankle injury. While preparing for the 1980 Moscow Olympics she injured her lower back in a car crash. She managed to recover and place second at the 1980 U.S. Olympic Trials, but could not attend the Games due to their boycott by the United States.

King graduated from the California State University, East Bay. She founded Beyond Sports, an organization that applies imagery to a wide range of individual and social concerns, such as world peace.

King was inducted into the Staten Island Sports Hall of Fame in 2013.
