= New Mexico Lobos track and field =

American college track and field team

- University: University of New Mexico
- Head coach: Darren Gauson
- Conference: MW
- Location: Reno, Nevada
- Outdoor track: Great Friends of UNM Track Stadium/UNM Soccer Complex
- Nickname: Lobos
- Colors: Cherry and silver

The New Mexico Lobos track and field team is the track and field program that represents University of New Mexico. The Lobos compete in NCAA Division I as a member of the Mountain West Conference. The team is based in Albuquerque, New Mexico, at the Great Friends of UNM Track Stadium/UNM Soccer Complex.

The program is coached by Darren Gauson. The track and field program officially encompasses four teams because the NCAA considers men's and women's indoor track and field and outdoor track and field as separate sports.

Middle-distance runner Josh Kerr became the first Lobo to win three NCAA individual titles in 2018.

== Postseason ==
=== AIAW ===
The Lobos have had 12 AIAW All-Americans finishing in the top six at the AIAW indoor or outdoor championships.

AIAW All-Americans
Championships	Name	Event	Place
1970 Outdoor	Barbara Butler	Shot put	4th
1970 Outdoor	Barbara Butler	Discus throw	2nd
1971 Outdoor	Lisa Chiavario	100 yards	5th
1971 Outdoor	Lisa Chiavario	Long jump	2nd
1971 Outdoor	Barbara Butler	Discus throw	1st
1973 Outdoor	Lisa Chiavario	200 meters hurdles	3rd
1973 Outdoor	Lisa Chiavario	High jump	5th
1973 Outdoor	Lisa Chiavario	Long jump	4th
1973 Outdoor	Barbara Butler	Discus throw	4th
1976 Outdoor	Susan Vigil	800 meters	4th
1976 Outdoor	Karen Cramond	2 miles	5th
1976 Outdoor	Karen Cramond	3 miles	3rd
1978 Outdoor	Susan Vigil	800 meters	5th
1978 Outdoor	Cindy Ashby	800 meters	6th
1979 Outdoor	Susan Vigil	800 meters	1st
1979 Outdoor	Margaret Metcalf	4 × 880 yards relay	2nd
1979 Outdoor	Lynn Brasher	4 × 880 yards relay	2nd
1979 Outdoor	Regina Dramiga	4 × 880 yards relay	2nd
1979 Outdoor	Susan Vigil	4 × 880 yards relay	2nd
1981 Outdoor	Michelle Matthias	200 meters	4th
1981 Outdoor	Charlotte Zepherin	4 × 100 meters relay	5th
1981 Outdoor	Amanda Fields	4 × 100 meters relay	5th
1981 Outdoor	Peggy Mallory	4 × 100 meters relay	5th
1981 Outdoor	Michelle Matthias	4 × 100 meters relay	5th

=== NCAA ===
As of August 2025, a total of 60 men and 20 women have achieved individual first-team All-American status for the team at the Division I men's outdoor, women's outdoor, men's indoor, or women's indoor national championships (using the modern criteria of top-8 placing regardless of athlete nationality).

First team NCAA All-Americans
Team	Championships	Name	Event	Place	Ref.
Men's	1957 Outdoor	Stanley Bazant	Shot put	8th	
Men's	1957 Outdoor	Buster Quist	Javelin throw	6th	
Men's	1958 Outdoor	Buster Quist	Javelin throw	2nd	
Men's	1959 Outdoor	Dick Howard	400 meters hurdles	1st	
Men's	1959 Outdoor	Buster Quist	Javelin throw	2nd	
Men's	1961 Outdoor	Adolph Plummer	400 meters	1st	
Men's	1962 Outdoor	Adolph Plummer	400 meters	4th	
Men's	1962 Outdoor	Ken Medley	Long jump	5th	
Men's	1964 Outdoor	Larry Kennedy	Discus throw	1st	
Men's	1965 Outdoor	Bernie Rivers	100 meters	4th	
Men's	1965 Outdoor	Art Carter	4 × 100 meters relay	6th	
Men's	1965 Outdoor	Walt Little	4 × 100 meters relay	6th	
Men's	1965 Outdoor	Ed Lloyd	4 × 100 meters relay	6th	
Men's	1965 Outdoor	Bernie Rivers	4 × 100 meters relay	6th	
Men's	1965 Outdoor	Clarence Robinson	Long jump	1st	
Men's	1965 Outdoor	Clarence Robinson	Triple jump	1st	
Men's	1966 Outdoor	Rene Matison	100 meters	4th	
Men's	1966 Outdoor	Bernie Rivers	4 × 100 meters relay	4th	
Men's	1966 Outdoor	Steve Caminiti	4 × 100 meters relay	4th	
Men's	1966 Outdoor	Rene Matison	4 × 100 meters relay	4th	
Men's	1966 Outdoor	Jim Singer	4 × 100 meters relay	4th	
Men's	1966 Outdoor	Ira Robinson	Long jump	4th	
Men's	1966 Outdoor	Art Baxter	Triple jump	4th	
Men's	1967 Indoor	Clark Mitchell	600 yards	2nd	
Men's	1967 Indoor	Web Louda	Mile run	4th	
Men's	1967 Indoor	George Scott	3000 meters	2nd	
Men's	1967 Indoor	Rene Matison	4 × 400 meters relay	4th	
Men's	1967 Indoor	Clark Mitchell	4 × 400 meters relay	4th	
Men's	1967 Indoor	Ken Head	4 × 400 meters relay	4th	
Men's	1967 Indoor	Art Baxter	4 × 400 meters relay	4th	
Men's	1967 Outdoor	Web Loudat	3000 meters steeplechase	3rd	
Men's	1967 Outdoor	George Scott	5000 meters	3rd	
Men's	1967 Outdoor	Art Baxter	Triple jump	1st	
Men's	1967 Outdoor	Frank Burgasser	Javelin throw	5th	
Men's	1968 Indoor	Adrian Dewindt	1000 meters	4th	
Men's	1968 Outdoor	Adrian Dewindt	3000 meters steeplechase	6th	
Men's	1968 Outdoor	Ervin Jaros	Discus throw	5th	
Men's	1971 Indoor	Reid Cole	600 yards	3rd	
Men's	1971 Indoor	Tom Ericson	800 meters	4th	
Men's	1971 Indoor	Charles Steffes	Triple jump	3rd	
Men's	1972 Indoor	Reid Cole	4 × 800 meters relay	3rd	
Men's	1972 Indoor	Gary Easterly	4 × 800 meters relay	3rd	
Men's	1972 Indoor	Bob Dooley	4 × 800 meters relay	3rd	
Men's	1972 Indoor	Matt Henry	4 × 800 meters relay	3rd	
Men's	1972 Indoor	Ingemar Nyman	High jump	5th	
Men's	1972 Indoor	Chuck Steffes	Triple jump	5th	
Men's	1972 Outdoor	Chuck Steffes	Triple jump	6th	
Men's	1973 Indoor	Ingemar Jernberg	Pole vault	4th	
Men's	1975 Indoor	Mike Solomon	600 yards	3rd	
Men's	1975 Indoor	John Allison	4 × 800 meters relay	5th	
Men's	1975 Indoor	Jay Miller	4 × 800 meters relay	5th	
Men's	1975 Indoor	Tom Snowden	4 × 800 meters relay	5th	
Men's	1975 Indoor	Bob Phippen	4 × 800 meters relay	5th	
Men's	1975 Outdoor	Mike Solomon	400 meters	8th	
Men's	1976 Indoor	Charles Dramiga	600 yards	1st	
Men's	1976 Indoor	Mike Solomon	600 yards	5th	
Men's	1976 Outdoor	Mike Solomon	400 meters	5th	
Men's	1977 Indoor	Mike Solomon	400 meters	3rd	
Men's	1977 Indoor	Mike Solomon	600 yards	1st	
Men's	1978 Indoor	Charles Dramiga	600 yards	4th	
Men's	1978 Indoor	Jay Quade	4 × 800 meters relay	1st	
Men's	1978 Indoor	Mark Romero	4 × 800 meters relay	1st	
Men's	1978 Indoor	Sammy Kipkurgat	4 × 800 meters relay	1st	
Men's	1978 Indoor	Jeremiah Ongwae	4 × 800 meters relay	1st	
Men's	1978 Outdoor	Fatwel Kimaiyo	400 meters hurdles	6th	
Men's	1978 Outdoor	Sammy Kipkurgat	800 meters	5th	
Men's	1978 Outdoor	Harrison Koroso	3000 meters steeplechase	6th	
Men's	1979 Indoor	Jeremiah Ongwae	800 meters	5th	
Men's	1979 Outdoor	Kip Koskei	1500 meters	3rd	
Men's	1980 Indoor	Fatwell Kimmaiyo	55 meters hurdles	5th	
Men's	1982 Outdoor	Marty Neibauer	Decathlon	5th	
Men's	1983 Indoor	Richie Martinez	4 × 800 meters relay	6th	
Men's	1983 Indoor	Ibrahim Hussein	4 × 800 meters relay	6th	
Men's	1983 Indoor	Roger Moore	4 × 800 meters relay	6th	
Men's	1983 Indoor	Pete Serna	4 × 800 meters relay	6th	
Men's	1983 Indoor	Dwayne Rudd	Long jump	5th	
Men's	1983 Outdoor	Ibrahim Hussein	3000 meters steeplechase	8th	
Men's	1984 Indoor	Ibrahim Hussein	1000 meters	3rd	
Men's	1984 Indoor	Dwayne Rudd	Long jump	3rd	
Men's	1984 Outdoor	Ibrahim Juma	10,000 meters	2nd	
Men's	1985 Outdoor	Gary Kinder	Decathlon	2nd	
Men's	1989 Indoor	Simon Arkell	Pole vault	7th	
Men's	1989 Outdoor	Bill Mangan	5000 meters	8th	
Men's	1989 Outdoor	Simon Arkell	Pole vault	6th	
Men's	1989 Outdoor	Darren Crawford	Shot put	6th	
Men's	1990 Indoor	Darren Crawford	Weight throw	3rd	
Men's	1990 Outdoor	Simon Arkell	Pole vault	3rd	
Women's	1990 Outdoor	Laverne Clarke	Long jump	8th	
Women's	1990 Outdoor	Laverne Clarke	Triple jump	8th	
Men's	1991 Outdoor	Simon Arkell	Pole vault	5th	
Women's	1996 Outdoor	Tangi Galloway	10,000 meters	4th	
Men's	2003 Outdoor	Matt Gonzales	10,000 meters	3rd	
Men's	2004 Outdoor	Matt Gonzales	10,000 meters	4th	
Men's	2005 Indoor	Matt Gonzales	5000 meters	4th	
Men's	2006 Indoor	Robert Caldwell	Pole vault	8th	
Men's	2007 Outdoor	Jeremy Johnson	10,000 meters	7th	
Men's	2008 Outdoor	Jeremy Johnson	10,000 meters	7th	
Men's	2008 Outdoor	Robert Caldwell	Pole vault	6th	
Women's	2008 Outdoor	Katie Coronado	Javelin throw	2nd	
Men's	2009 Indoor	Jarrin Solomon	400 meters	5th	
Men's	2009 Indoor	Lee Emanuel	Mile run	1st	
Men's	2009 Outdoor	Lee Emanuel	1500 meters	3rd	
Women's	2009 Outdoor	Michelle Corrigan	10,000 meters	8th	
Men's	2010 Indoor	Lee Emanuel	Mile run	1st	
Men's	2010 Indoor	Rory Fraser	3000 meters	6th	
Men's	2010 Indoor	Chris Barnicle	5000 meters	4th	
Women's	2010 Indoor	Sandy Fortner	Pentathlon	3rd	
Men's	2010 Outdoor	Lee Emanuel	1500 meters	6th	
Men's	2011 Indoor	Sam Evans	Distance medley relay	6th	
Men's	2011 Indoor	Richard York	Distance medley relay	6th	
Men's	2011 Indoor	Gabe Aragon	Distance medley relay	6th	
Men's	2011 Indoor	David Bishop	Distance medley relay	6th	
Men's	2011 Outdoor	Rory Fraser	5000 meters	6th	
Men's	2011 Outdoor	Keith Gerrard	10,000 meters	7th	
Men's	2012 Indoor	Peter Callahan	Mile run	6th	
Men's	2012 Indoor	Kendall Spencer	Long jump	1st	
Men's	2012 Indoor	Floyd Ross	Triple jump	8th	
Women's	2012 Indoor	Sarah Waldron	5000 meters	8th	
Men's	2012 Outdoor	Floyd Ross	Triple jump	2nd	
Women's	2012 Outdoor	Sarah Waldron	10,000 meters	6th	
Men's	2013 Indoor	Luke Caldwell	5000 meters	8th	
Men's	2013 Indoor	Floyd Ross	Triple jump	8th	
Men's	2013 Outdoor	Luke Caldwell	5000 meters	7th	
Men's	2013 Outdoor	Floyd Ross	Triple jump	3rd	
Men's	2014 Indoor	Luke Caldwell	5000 meters	6th	
Men's	2014 Indoor	Kendall Spencer	Long jump	8th	
Men's	2014 Outdoor	Peter Callahan	1500 meters	4th	
Men's	2015 Indoor	Adam Bitchell	3000 meters	6th	
Men's	2015 Indoor	Allan Hamilton	Long jump	6th	
Women's	2015 Indoor	Sammy Silva	Mile run	6th	
Men's	2015 Outdoor	Peter Callahan	1500 meters	4th	
Men's	2015 Outdoor	Logan Pflibsen	Pole vault	6th	
Women's	2015 Outdoor	Calli Hauger-Thackery	5000 meters	6th	
Women's	2015 Outdoor	Alice Wright	10,000 meters	8th	
Women's	2016 Indoor	Sophie Connor	Mile run	5th	
Women's	2016 Indoor	Calli Hauger-Thackery	3000 meters	6th	
Women's	2016 Outdoor	Courtney Frerichs	3000 meters steeplechase	1st	
Women's	2016 Outdoor	Alice Wright	10,000 meters	2nd	
Men's	2017 Indoor	Josh Kerr	Mile run	1st	
Men's	2017 Outdoor	Josh Kerr	1500 meters	1st	
Men's	2017 Outdoor	Samuel Trigg	Triple jump	8th	
Women's	2017 Outdoor	Alice Wright	10,000 meters	2nd	
Men's	2018 Indoor	Josh Kerr	Mile run	1st	
Women's	2018 Indoor	Weini Kelati	3000 meters	5th	
Women's	2018 Indoor	Ednah Kurgat	3000 meters	8th	
Women's	2018 Indoor	Ednah Kurgat	5000 meters	2nd	
Women's	2018 Indoor	Weini Kelati	5000 meters	5th	
Men's	2018 Outdoor	Josh Kerr	1500 meters	3rd	
Women's	2018 Outdoor	Charlotte Prouse	3000 meters steeplechase	2nd	
Women's	2018 Outdoor	Ednah Kurgat	5000 meters	6th	
Women's	2018 Outdoor	Alice Wright	10,000 meters	4th	
Women's	2019 Indoor	Weini Kelati	3000 meters	3rd	
Women's	2019 Indoor	Weini Kelati	5000 meters	2nd	
Women's	2019 Indoor	Ednah Kurgat	5000 meters	4th	
Women's	2019 Indoor	Charlotte Prouse	5000 meters	5th	
Women's	2019 Outdoor	Charlotte Prouse	3000 meters steeplechase	2nd	
Women's	2019 Outdoor	Adva Cohen	3000 meters steeplechase	4th	
Women's	2019 Outdoor	Weini Kelati	5000 meters	5th	
Women's	2019 Outdoor	Weini Kelati	10,000 meters	1st	
Women's	2021 Outdoor	Charlotte Prouse	3000 meters steeplechase	5th	
Women's	2022 Indoor	Amelia Mazza-Downie	5000 meters	7th	
Women's	2022 Indoor	Gracelyn Larkin	5000 meters	8th	
Women's	2022 Outdoor	Elise Thorner	3000 meters steeplechase	5th	
Women's	2022 Outdoor	Adva Cohen	3000 meters steeplechase	8th	
Women's	2022 Outdoor	Gracelyn Larkin	5000 meters	7th	
Women's	2023 Indoor	Gracelyn Larkin	5000 meters	7th	
Women's	2023 Outdoor	Elise Thorner	3000 meters steeplechase	5th	
Women's	2023 Outdoor	Amelia Mazza-Downie	10,000 meters	4th	
Men's	2024 Indoor	Habtom Samuel	3000 meters	7th	
Men's	2024 Indoor	Habtom Samuel	5000 meters	4th	
Men's	2024 Outdoor	Habtom Samuel	5000 meters	6th	
Men's	2024 Outdoor	Habtom Samuel	10,000 meters	1st	
Men's	2025 Indoor	Habtom Samuel	5000 meters	2nd	
Men's	2025 Indoor	Ishmael Kipkurui	5000 meters	7th	
Women's	2025 Indoor	Pamela Kosgei	5000 meters	3rd	
Men's	2025 Outdoor	Matthew Kosgei	3000 meters steeplechase	6th	
Men's	2025 Outdoor	Habtom Samuel	5000 meters	2nd	
Men's	2025 Outdoor	Ishmael Kipkurui	5000 meters	7th	
Men's	2025 Outdoor	Ishmael Kipkurui	10,000 meters	1st	
Men's	2025 Outdoor	Habtom Samuel	10,000 meters	2nd	
Women's	2025 Outdoor	Pamela Kosgei	5000 meters	1st	
Women's	2025 Outdoor	Marion Jepngetich	5000 meters	4th	
Women's	2025 Outdoor	Pamela Kosgei	10,000 meters	1st	

== See also ==
- Category:New Mexico Lobos men's track and field athletes (24)
- Category:New Mexico Lobos women's track and field athletes (12)
