= 1970 DGWS Outdoor Track and Field Championships =

Athletics championship event in Illinois

- Dates: May 29–30, 1970
- Host city: Urbana, Illinois
- Venue: University of Illinois Urbana-Champaign

The 1970 DGWS Outdoor Track And Field Championships were the 2nd annual Division for Girls' and Women's Sports-sanctioned track meet to determine the individual and team national champions of women's collegiate track and field events in the United States. They were contested May 29−30, 1970 in Urbana, Illinois at the University of Illinois Urbana-Champaign and won by the host Illinois Fighting Illini track and field team.

There were not separate Division I, II, and III championships for outdoor track and field until 1981. The meet would be called the DGWS Championships until 1972, when the DGWS changed its name to the Association for Intercollegiate Athletics for Women (AIAW).

The meeting was praised for attracting more competition than the previous year, in part due to removing a rule that restricted club athletes from competing. A total of 53 schools and over 200 athletes participated.

The meet served as a qualifier for the 1970 World University Games later that year.

== Team standings ==
- Scoring: 10 points for a 1st-place finish, 8 points for 2nd, 6 points for 3rd, 4 points for 4th, 2 points for 5th, and 1 point for 6th. Top 10 teams shown.

Rank	Team	Points
1st place, gold medalist(s)	Illinois Fighting Illini	40
2nd place, silver medalist(s)	Alcorn State Lady Braves	33
3rd place, bronze medalist(s)	Montclair State Red Hawks	28
4th	Texas Woman's Pioneers	26
5th	LIU Brooklyn Blackbirds	22
6th	Flathead Valley Mountainettes	19
7th	Grossmont Griffins	18
8th	Colorado State Rams	16
8th	Tennessee Volunteers	16
10th	Cal Poly Pomona Broncos	14
10th	Murray State Racers	14
10th	Parkland Cobras	14

== Results ==
- Only top six results of finals are shown

100 yards
Pl.	Name	Team	Mark
1st place, gold medalist(s)	Judy Murphy	Texas Woman's Pioneers	10.4 w
2nd place, silver medalist(s)	Pat Hawkins	LIU Brooklyn Blackbirds	10.4 w
3rd place, bronze medalist(s)	Katherine Jones	Illinois Fighting Illini	10.5 w
4th	Helen Williams	Alcorn State Lady Braves	10.8 w
5th	Linda Reynolds	Kingsborough Wave	10.9 w
6th	Mollie Hence	Alcorn State Lady Braves	10.9 w

220 yards
Pl.	Name	Team	Mark
1st place, gold medalist(s)	Una Morris	Cal Poly Pomona Broncos	23.9 w
2nd place, silver medalist(s)	Judy Murphy	Texas Woman's Pioneers	24.4 w
3rd place, bronze medalist(s)	Linda Reynolds	Kingsborough Wave	24.5 w
4th	Katherine Jones	Illinois Fighting Illini	24.7 w
5th	Helen Williams	Alcorn State Lady Braves	24.7 w
6th	Alida Van Gores	El Camino Warriors	NT

440 yards (Note: Only 5 finishers)
Pl.	Name	Team	Mark
1st place, gold medalist(s)	Gale Fitzgerald	Montclair State Red Hawks	56.2
2nd place, silver medalist(s)	Gwen Norman	District of Columbia Firebirds	56.3
3rd place, bronze medalist(s)	Mary Norrells	Alcorn State Lady Braves	57.7
4th	Karen Lehman	Central Michigan Chippewas	58.4
5th	Laurie Tucholski	Toledo Rockets	59.7

880 yards
Pl.	Name	Team	Mark
1st place, gold medalist(s)	Terry Hull	Tennessee Volunteers	2:09.7
2nd place, silver medalist(s)	Nancy Shafer	Wooster Fighting Scots	2:14.3
3rd place, bronze medalist(s)	Barbara Lawson	Colorado State Rams	2:16.0
4th	Kathleen Pratt	Minnesota Golden Gophers	2:23.5
5th	Dolly McFadyean	Flathead Valley Mountainettes	2:27.1
6th	Lyndell Wilken	Illinois Fighting Illini	2:30.4

Mile run
Pl.	Name	Team	Mark
1st place, gold medalist(s)	Barbara Lawson	Colorado State Rams	5:02.7
2nd place, silver medalist(s)	Shelley Marshall	NYU Violets	5:09.1
3rd place, bronze medalist(s)	Kathleen Pratt	Minnesota Golden Gophers	5:09.6
4th	Kathleen Rogers	McPherson Bulldogs	5:22.0
5th	Wonda Powell	Michigan Wolverines	5:24.4
6th	Lyndell Wilken	Illinois Fighting Illini	5:25.2

100 m hurdles
Pl.	Name	Team	Mark
1st place, gold medalist(s)	Pat Donnelly	Grossmont Griffins	13.5 w
2nd place, silver medalist(s)	Cheryl Rogers	Illinois Fighting Illini	13.6 w
3rd place, bronze medalist(s)	Deanne Carlsen	Chico State Wildcats	13.9 w
4th	Pat Hawkins	LIU Brooklyn Blackbirds	14.3 w
5th	Carla Coffey	Murray State Racers	14.4 w
6th	Frances Greene	Montclair State Red Hawks	14.6 w

200 m hurdles
Pl.	Name	Team	Mark
1st place, gold medalist(s)	Pat Hawkins	LIU Brooklyn Blackbirds	26.7
2nd place, silver medalist(s)	Pat Donnelly	Grossmont Griffins	26.9
3rd place, bronze medalist(s)	Deanne Carlsen	Chico State Wildcats	27.8
4th	Carla Coffey	Murray State Racers	28.4
5th	Connie Peterson	Illinois Fighting Illini	29.4
6th	Frances Greene	Montclair State Red Hawks	29.7

4 × 110 yards relay
Pl.	Name	Team	Mark
1st place, gold medalist(s)	Helen Williams	Alcorn State Lady Braves	48.5
1st place, gold medalist(s)	Mollie Hence	Alcorn State Lady Braves	48.5
1st place, gold medalist(s)	Amanda Hornesburger	Alcorn State Lady Braves	48.5
1st place, gold medalist(s)	Fayetta Dukes	Alcorn State Lady Braves	48.5
2nd place, silver medalist(s)		Illinois Fighting Illini	49.8
3rd place, bronze medalist(s)		Texas Woman's Pioneers	51.1
4th		Murray State Racers	51.1
5th		Cal Poly Pomona Broncos	51.6
6th		Texas Tech Red Raiders	52.6

Sprint medley relay (Note: Held at a total distance of 880 yards, with the first leg running 220 yards, the middle two legs running 110 yards, and the anchor leg running 440 yards.)
Pl.	Name	Team	Mark
1st place, gold medalist(s)	Lettie Bartee	Alcorn State Lady Braves	1:47.3
1st place, gold medalist(s)	Amanda Hornesburger	Alcorn State Lady Braves	1:47.3
1st place, gold medalist(s)	Fayetta Dukes	Alcorn State Lady Braves	1:47.3
1st place, gold medalist(s)	Mary Morrells	Alcorn State Lady Braves	1:47.3
2nd place, silver medalist(s)		Texas Woman's Pioneers	1:56.2
3rd place, bronze medalist(s)	Pam Brandis	Washington Huskies	1:56.4
3rd place, bronze medalist(s)	Sue Schubert	Washington Huskies	1:56.4
3rd place, bronze medalist(s)	Joyce Pearson	Washington Huskies	1:56.4
3rd place, bronze medalist(s)	Nancy Richmond	Washington Huskies	1:56.4
4th		Murray State Racers	1:57.1
5th		Indiana State Sycamores	2:00.0
6th		Texas Tech Red Raiders	2:01.0

High jump
Pl.	Name	Team	Mark
1st place, gold medalist(s)	Connie Peterson	Illinois Fighting Illini	5 ft 4 in (1.62 m)
2nd place, silver medalist(s)	Becky Nelson	Eastern Washington Eagles	5 ft 2 in (1.57 m)
3rd place, bronze medalist(s)	Roxanne Demik	BYU Cougars	5 ft 0 in (1.52 m)
4th	Liz Sharp	Parkland Cobras	5 ft 0 in (1.52 m)
5th	Retha Regnier	Oklahoma State Cowgirls	5 ft 0 in (1.52 m)
6th	Holly Harrison	Texas State Bobcats	5 ft 0 in (1.52 m)

Long jump
Pl.	Name	Team	Mark
1st place, gold medalist(s)	Pat Shipley	Indiana State Sycamores	18 ft 7 1/4 in (5.67 m)
2nd place, silver medalist(s)	Karen Aufdenhaar	Texas State Bobcats	18 ft 5 in (5.61 m)
3rd place, bronze medalist(s)	Barbara Lundberg	Northern Colorado Bears	17 ft 11 1/2 in (5.47 m)
4th	Dee Stoneback	Eastern Washington Eagles	17 ft 4 1/4 in (5.28 m)
5th	April Jaeger	Cal Poly Pomona Broncos	17 ft 3 1/2 in (5.27 m)
6th	Judy Cox	Kentucky Wildcats	17 ft 2 1/4 in (5.23 m)

Shot put
Pl.	Name	Team	Mark
1st place, gold medalist(s)	Pauline Thomas	Green River Gators	43 ft 8 1/2 in (13.32 m)
2nd place, silver medalist(s)	Denise Wood	Montclair State Red Hawks	42 ft 0 1/2 in (12.81 m)
3rd place, bronze medalist(s)	Marridy Taylor	Flathead Valley Mountainettes	40 ft 5 1/4 in (12.32 m)
4th	Barbara Butler	New Mexico Lobos	40 ft 3 in (12.26 m)
5th	Diane Franklin	Flathead Valley Mountainettes	36 ft 7 in (11.15 m)
6th	Parks (Note: Listed as "{Missing} Parks" by Indiana State University)	Indiana State Sycamores	35 ft 5 in (10.79 m)

Discus throw
Pl.	Name	Team	Mark
1st place, gold medalist(s)	Liz Sharp	Parkland Cobras	136 ft 10 in (41.7 m)
2nd place, silver medalist(s)	Barbara Butler	New Mexico Lobos	135 ft 10 in (41.4 m)
3rd place, bronze medalist(s)	Denise Wood	Montclair State Red Hawks	135 ft 4 in (41.24 m)
4th	Tracy Peterson	Wayne State Warriors	129 ft 7 in (39.49 m)
5th	Pauline Thomas	Green River Gators	113 ft 9 in (34.67 m)
6th	Diane Franklin	Flathead Valley Mountainettes	103 ft 8 in (31.59 m)

Javelin throw
Pl.	Name	Team	Mark
1st place, gold medalist(s)	Sherry Calvert	USC Trojans	172 ft 10 in (52.67 m)
2nd place, silver medalist(s)	Diane Franklin	Flathead Valley Mountainettes	153 ft 2 in (46.68 m)
3rd place, bronze medalist(s)	Barbara Friedrich	Kean Cougars	151 ft 4 in (46.12 m)
4th	Mary K. Hyde	Oklahoma State Cowgirls	136 ft 5 in (41.57 m)
5th	Denise Wood	Montclair State Red Hawks	131 ft 1 in (39.95 m)
6th	Barbara Lundberg	Northern Colorado Bears	130 ft 9 in (39.85 m)

== See also ==
- Association for Intercollegiate Athletics for Women championships § Outdoor track and field
- 1970 NCAA Division I Outdoor Track and Field Championships
