= 1971 DGWS Outdoor Track and Field Championships =

Athletics championship event in Washington

- Dates: May 14–15, 1971
- Host city: (Washington (state)) Cheney, Washington; Eastern Washington University
- Venue: Woodward Field
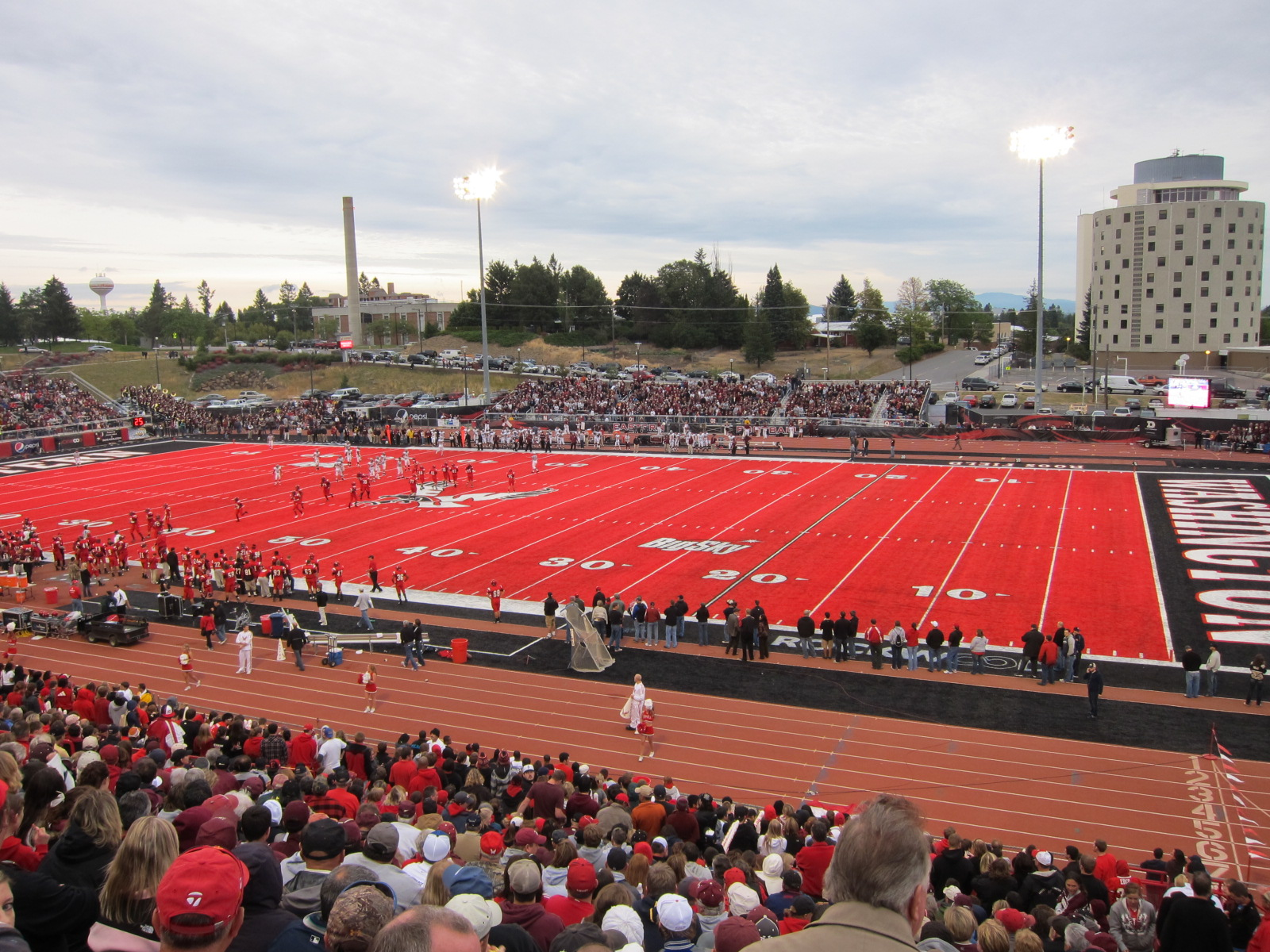

The 1971 DGWS Outdoor Track And Field Championships were the 3rd annual Division for Girls' and Women's Sports-sanctioned track meet to determine the individual and team national champions of women's collegiate track and field events in the United States. They were contested May 14−15, 1971 in Cheney, Washington at the Woodward Field by host Eastern Washington University.

There were not separate Division I, II, and III championships for outdoor track and field until 1981. The meet would be called the DGWS Championships until 1972, after which the DGWS changed its name to the Association for Intercollegiate Athletics for Women (AIAW).

With 28 schools competing, Texas Woman's University won the team title despite not winning any individual events. Individually, Chi Cheng Reel won three events for Cal Poly Pomona despite health questions and her legs being so sore entering the meet that it "hurt to walk". There were strong winds throughout and rain on the final day of competition which hindered performances.

== Team standings ==
- Scoring: 10 points for a 1st-place finish, 8 points for 2nd, 6 points for 3rd, 4 points for 4th, 2 points for 5th, and 1 point for 6th. Top 10 teams shown.

Rank	Team	Points
1st place, gold medalist(s)	Texas Woman's Pioneers	56
2nd place, silver medalist(s)	Cal State East Bay Pioneers	53
3rd place, bronze medalist(s)	Cal Poly Pomona Broncos	46
4th	Flathead Valley Mountainettes	39
5th	Eastern Washington Eagles	33
6th	Lane Titans	30
7th	Oregon Ducks	23
8th	New Mexico Lobos	20
9th	Murray State Racers	18
10th	Central Washington Wildcats	16
10th	Oregon State Beavers	16

== Results ==
- Only top six results of finals are shown

100 yards
Pl.	Name	Team	Mark
1st place, gold medalist(s)	Chi Cheng Reel	Cal Poly Pomona Broncos	10.9
2nd place, silver medalist(s)	Judy Murphy	Texas Woman's Pioneers	11.1
3rd place, bronze medalist(s)	Kathy Smallwood	Cal Poly Pomona Broncos	11.4
4th	Wanda Taylor	Oregon Ducks	11.5
5th	Lisa Chiavario	New Mexico Lobos	11.5
6th	Rochelle Barker	Texas Woman's Pioneers	11.7

220 yards
Pl.	Name	Team	Mark
1st place, gold medalist(s)	Kathy Smallwood	Cal Poly Pomona Broncos	24.8
2nd place, silver medalist(s)	Judy Murphy	Texas Woman's Pioneers	24.9
3rd place, bronze medalist(s)	Wanda Taylor	Oregon Ducks	25.3
4th	Cheron Billeck	Texas Woman's Pioneers	25.9
5th	Sue Bronson	Flathead Valley Mountainettes	26.1
6th	Sylvia Longoria	Texas Woman's Pioneers	26.1

440 yards
Pl.	Name	Team	Mark
1st place, gold medalist(s)	Cis Shafer	Cal State East Bay Pioneers	56.2
2nd place, silver medalist(s)	Shirley Swanson	Western Washington Vikings	59.2
3rd place, bronze medalist(s)	Sylvia Longoria	Texas Woman's Pioneers	59.3
4th	Marion Service	Washington Huskies	59.9
5th	Mary Evans	Oregon State Beavers	60.4
6th	Gerry Brockman	West Texas A&M Buffaloes	61.5

880 yards
Pl.	Name	Team	Mark
1st place, gold medalist(s)	Cis Shafer	Cal State East Bay Pioneers	2:15.6
2nd place, silver medalist(s)	Sherry Wells	Oregon Ducks	2:18.6
3rd place, bronze medalist(s)	Caroline Kruckeburg	Central Washington Wildcats	2:19.0
4th	Cindy Arbelbide	Oregon State Beavers	2:22.7
5th	Rosie Orta	Texas Woman's Pioneers	2:22.7
6th	Diane Hooker	Texas Woman's Pioneers	2:22.9

Mile run
Pl.	Name	Team	Mark
1st place, gold medalist(s)	Caroline Kruckeburg	Central Washington Wildcats	5:12.5
2nd place, silver medalist(s)	Linda McCain	Cal State East Bay Pioneers	5:13.7
3rd place, bronze medalist(s)	Judy Smith	Western New Mexico Mustangs	5:15.6
4th	Sharon Burgess	Florida State Seminoles	5:15.8
5th	Rosie Orta	Texas Woman's Pioneers	5:24.9
6th	Janet Freedenburg	Southern Oregon Raiders	5:29.2

100 m hurdles
Pl.	Name	Team	Mark
1st place, gold medalist(s)	Carla Coffey	Murray State Racers	14.6
2nd place, silver medalist(s)	Judy Potter	Eastern Washington Eagles	15.0
3rd place, bronze medalist(s)	Carolyn Turner	Texas Woman's Pioneers	16.0
4th	Nancy Olsen	Eastern Washington Eagles	16.3
5th	Cathy Delessert	Portland State Vikings	16.6
6th	Andrea Aichele	Oregon Ducks	16.7

200 m hurdles
Pl.	Name	Team	Mark
1st place, gold medalist(s)	Marilyn King	Cal State East Bay Pioneers	27.7
2nd place, silver medalist(s)	Carla Coffey	Murray State Racers	27.7
3rd place, bronze medalist(s)	Gail Boyd	Western Oregon Wolves	27.9
4th	Marilyn Linsenmeyer	Oklahoma State Cowgirls	29.9
5th	Carolyn Turner	Texas Woman's Pioneers	30.1
6th	Robin Van Blarcum	Texas Woman's Pioneers	30.1

High jump
Pl.	Name	Team	Mark
1st place, gold medalist(s)	Becky Nelson	Eastern Washington Eagles	5 ft 2 in (1.57 m)
2nd place, silver medalist(s)	Karin Wicklund	Lane Titans	5 ft 1 in (1.54 m)
3rd place, bronze medalist(s)	Linda Winter	Oregon State Beavers	5 ft 0 in (1.52 m)
4th	Marilyn Linsenmeyer	Oklahoma State Cowgirls	4 ft 11 in (1.49 m)
5th	Kim Favorite	Cal State East Bay Pioneers	4 ft 10 in (1.47 m)
6th	Diane Davis	Texas Tech Red Raiders	4 ft 8 in (1.42 m)

Long jump
Pl.	Name	Team	Mark
1st place, gold medalist(s)	Chi Cheng Reel	Cal Poly Pomona Broncos	20 ft 4 3/4 in (6.21 m)
2nd place, silver medalist(s)	Lisa Chiavario	New Mexico Lobos	19 ft 6 3/4 in (5.96 m)
3rd place, bronze medalist(s)	Marilyn King	Cal State East Bay Pioneers	19 ft 3 in (5.86 m)
4th	Jo Meaker	West Texas A&M Buffaloes	18 ft 2 3/4 in (5.55 m)
5th	Judy Potter	Eastern Washington Eagles	17 ft 8 1/4 in (5.39 m)
6th	Jeri Nored	Oregon State Beavers	17 ft 4 in (5.28 m)

Shot put
Pl.	Name	Team	Mark
1st place, gold medalist(s)	Maren Seidler	Tufts Jumbos	47 ft 6 1/2 in (14.49 m)
2nd place, silver medalist(s)	Beth Smith	Lane Titans	42 ft 7 1/2 in (12.99 m)
3rd place, bronze medalist(s)	Lorraine Hien	Lane Titans	39 ft 7 3/4 in (12.08 m)
4th	Rene Kesler	Flathead Valley Mountainettes	38 ft 0 3/4 in (11.6 m)
5th	Nancy Snyder	Eastern Washington Eagles	37 ft 11 in (11.55 m)
6th	Merridy Taylor	Flathead Valley Mountainettes	37 ft 1 1/4 in (11.3 m)

Discus throw
Pl.	Name	Team	Mark
1st place, gold medalist(s)	Barbara Butler	New Mexico Lobos	142 ft 5 in (43.4 m)
2nd place, silver medalist(s)	Beth Smith	Lane Titans	137 ft 6 1/2 in (41.92 m)
3rd place, bronze medalist(s)	Rene Kesler	Flathead Valley Mountainettes	132 ft 1 1/2 in (40.27 m)
4th	Jean Parks	Southern Oregon Raiders	126 ft 2 in (38.45 m)
5th	Linda Rowe	Graceland Yellowjackets	123 ft 8 1/2 in (37.7 m)
6th	Karen Botts	Oregon State Beavers	123 ft 6 in (37.64 m)

Javelin throw
Pl.	Name	Team	Mark
1st place, gold medalist(s)	Barbara Friedrich	Kean Cougars	155 ft 0 in (47.24 m)
2nd place, silver medalist(s)	Diane Franklin	Flathead Valley Mountainettes	152 ft 0 1/2 in (46.34 m)
3rd place, bronze medalist(s)	Donna Dietrich	Grossmont Griffins	143 ft 1 1/2 in (43.62 m)
4th	Barbara Pickel	Cal State East Bay Pioneers	138 ft 5 1/2 in (42.2 m)
5th	Cheryl Patterson	Western Oregon Wolves	137 ft 3 in (41.83 m)
6th	Jane Miller	Portland State Vikings	135 ft 8 in (41.35 m)

4 × 110 yards relay
Pl.	Name	Team	Mark
1st place, gold medalist(s)	Mindy Sharp	Flathead Valley Mountainettes	49.0
1st place, gold medalist(s)	Roberta Stetson	Flathead Valley Mountainettes	49.0
1st place, gold medalist(s)	Merridy Taylor	Flathead Valley Mountainettes	49.0
1st place, gold medalist(s)	Sue Bronson	Flathead Valley Mountainettes	49.0
2nd place, silver medalist(s)		Texas Woman's Pioneers	49.1
2nd place, silver medalist(s)	Cheron Billeck	Texas Woman's Pioneers	49.1
3rd place, bronze medalist(s)		Eastern Washington Eagles	50.6
4th		Western Oregon Wolves	50.9
5th		Oregon State Beavers	51.3
6th		Cal State East Bay Pioneers	51.9

Sprint medley relay (Note: Held at a total distance of 880 yards, with the first leg running 220 yards, the middle two legs running 110 yards, and the anchor leg running 440 yards.)
Pl.	Name	Team	Mark
1st place, gold medalist(s)	Kathy Smallwood	Cal Poly Pomona Broncos	1:44.3
1st place, gold medalist(s)	Charise Clardy	Cal Poly Pomona Broncos	1:44.3
1st place, gold medalist(s)	Vivian Hughes	Cal Poly Pomona Broncos	1:44.3
1st place, gold medalist(s)	Chi Cheng Reel	Cal Poly Pomona Broncos	1:44.3
2nd place, silver medalist(s)		Flathead Valley Mountainettes	1:50.8
3rd place, bronze medalist(s)		Texas Woman's Pioneers	1:51.2
4th		Oregon Ducks	1:51.4
5th		Cal State East Bay Pioneers	1:51.5
6th		Eastern Washington Eagles	1:53.8

== See also ==
- Association for Intercollegiate Athletics for Women championships § Outdoor track and field
- 1971 NCAA Division I Outdoor Track and Field Championships
