= 1973 AIAW Outdoor Track and Field Championships =

National women's athletics collegiate championship event

- Dates: May 11–12, 1973
- Host city: Hayward, California; California State University, East Bay
- Venue: Pioneer Stadium
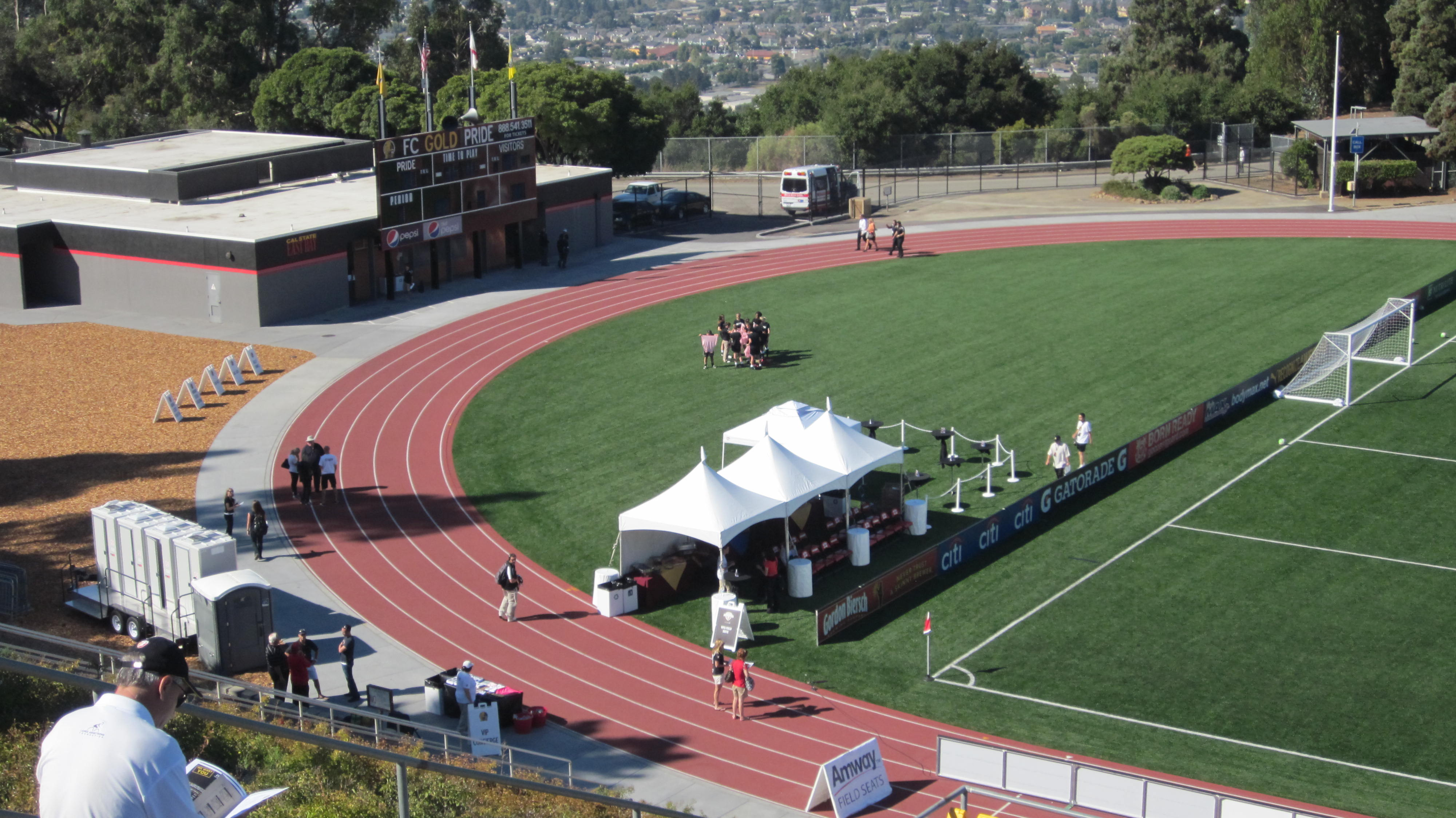

The 1973 AIAW Outdoor Track And Field Championships were the 5th annual Association for Intercollegiate Athletics for Women-sanctioned track meet to determine the individual and team national champions of women's collegiate track and field events in the United States. They were contested May 11−12, 1973 in Hayward, California at the Pioneer Stadium by host California State University, East Bay.

There were not separate Division I, II, and III championships for outdoor track and field until 1981. Prior to the 1973 meet, the competition was called the Division for Girls' and Women's Sports (DGWS) championships.

The meeting was highlighted by Lynette Matthews, who was the meet's only double winner in the shot put and discus. The Texas Woman's Pioneers won the team competition for the 3rd time.

== Team standings ==
- Scoring: 10 points for a 1st-place finish, 8 points for 2nd, 6 points for 3rd, 4 points for 4th, 2 points for 5th, and 1 point for 6th. Top 10 teams shown.

Rank	Team	Points
1st place, gold medalist(s)	Texas Woman's Pioneers	64
2nd place, silver medalist(s)	Cal State East Bay Pioneers	38
3rd place, bronze medalist(s)	Seattle Pacific Falcons	37
4th	Cal State Los Angeles Golden Eagles	28
5th	UC Davis Aggies	26
6th	Illinois Fighting Illini	22.5
7th	Western Washington Vikings	20
8th	New Mexico Lobos	18
9th	Cal State Northridge Matadors	16
9th	San Jose State Spartans	16

== Results ==
- Only top six results of finals are shown

100 yards (+1.0 m/s)
Pl.	Name	Team	Mark
1st place, gold medalist(s)	Rochelle Davis	Texas Woman's Pioneers	10.6
2nd place, silver medalist(s)	Kathie Lawson	UMass Minutewomen	10.7
3rd place, bronze medalist(s)	Veronica Harris	Chicago State Cougars	10.8
4th	Pam Greene	Northern Colorado Bears	10.8
5th	Janet Brown	Denver CityHawks	10.9
6th	Audrey Reid	Texas Woman's Pioneers	10.9

220 yards (+0.7 m/s)
Pl.	Name	Team	Mark
1st place, gold medalist(s)	Pam Greene	Northern Colorado Bears	24.2
2nd place, silver medalist(s)	Rochelle Davis	Texas Woman's Pioneers	24.4
3rd place, bronze medalist(s)	Janet Brown	Denver CityHawks	24.5
4th	Maeoper West	Illinois Fighting Illini	24.6
5th	Kathie Lawson	UMass Minutewomen	24.7
6th	Veronica Harris	Chicago State Cougars	24.9

440 yards
Pl.	Name	Team	Mark
1st place, gold medalist(s)	Maeoper West	Illinois Fighting Illini	55.2
2nd place, silver medalist(s)	Jarvis Scott	Cal State Los Angeles Golden Eagles	55.6
3rd place, bronze medalist(s)	Cindy Poor	UC Davis Aggies	55.9
4th	Marilyn McClung	Texas Woman's Pioneers	57.2
5th	Lynn Smith	Hawaii Rainbow Wahine	58.1
6th	Lucia Vaamonde	Denver CityHawks	58.5

880 yards
Pl.	Name	Team	Mark
1st place, gold medalist(s)	Nancy Mullen	Sacramento State Hornets	2:11.0
2nd place, silver medalist(s)	Liane Swegle	Seattle Redhawks	2:11.6
3rd place, bronze medalist(s)	Rebecca Denis	Cal State Northridge Matadors	2:12.1
4th	Cis Schafer	Cal State East Bay Pioneers	2:13.8
5th	Alice Brinkeroff	Montana Lady Griz	2:16.3
6th	Sherry Session	North Texas Mean Green	2:16.9

Mile run
Pl.	Name	Team	Mark
1st place, gold medalist(s)	Jackie Hanson	Cal State Northridge Matadors	4:54.1
2nd place, silver medalist(s)	Ona Dobratz	Oregon Ducks	4:57.6
3rd place, bronze medalist(s)	Kathy McIntyre	Seattle Pacific Falcons	5:01.0
4th	Maryl Barker	Oregon Ducks	5:02.1
5th	Sharon Burgess	Florida State Seminoles	5:05.2
6th	Laurel Miller	Seattle Pacific Falcons	5:08.4

2 miles (Note: Held as an exhibition with points not counting towards team standings. Not all competitors in this race represented collegiate teams.)
Pl.	Name	Team	Mark
1st place, gold medalist(s)	Laurel Miller	Seattle Pacific Falcons	11:18.5
2nd place, silver medalist(s)	Jan Freedenburg	Will's Spikettes	11:23.1
3rd place, bronze medalist(s)	Cindy Hough	Northwest Missouri State Bearcats	11:24.0
4th	Sharon Burgess	Florida State Seminoles	11:27.4
5th	Marilee Underhill	Washington State Cougars	11:34.6
6th	Margaret Tolbert	Florida Gators	11:44.5

100 m hurdles
Pl.	Name	Team	Mark
1st place, gold medalist(s)	Wendy Taylor	Western Washington Vikings	14.2
2nd place, silver medalist(s)	Patrice Donnelly	Cal Poly Mustangs	14.3
3rd place, bronze medalist(s)	Audrey Reid	Texas Woman's Pioneers	14.9
4th	Marilyn King	Cal State East Bay Pioneers	15.0
5th	Lucia Vaamonde	Denver CityHawks	15.0
6th	Kathi Guiney	Portland Panthers	15.1

200 m hurdles
Pl.	Name	Team	Mark
1st place, gold medalist(s)	Marilyn Linsemeyer	Oklahoma State Cowgirls	28.7
2nd place, silver medalist(s)	Kathi Guiney	Portland Panthers	28.9
3rd place, bronze medalist(s)	Lisa Chiavario	New Mexico Lobos	28.9
4th	Lynae Larson	Dickinson State Blue Hawks	29.3
5th	Heidi Davidson	Colorado Buffaloes	29.4
6th	Sue Cornellus	Flathead Valley Mountainettes	29.7

High jump
Pl.	Name	Team	Mark
1st place, gold medalist(s)	Audrey Reid	Texas Woman's Pioneers	5 ft 8 in (1.72 m)
2nd place, silver medalist(s)	Karen Moller	Temple Owls	5 ft 7 in (1.7 m)
3rd place, bronze medalist(s)	Kim Favorite	Cal State East Bay Pioneers	5 ft 5 in (1.65 m)
3rd place, bronze medalist(s)	Marilyn Linsemeyer	Oklahoma State Cowgirls	5 ft 5 in (1.65 m)
5th	Lisa Chiavario	New Mexico Lobos	5 ft 5 in (1.65 m)
6th	Donna Schulenberg	Illinois Fighting Illini	5 ft 5 in (1.65 m)
6th	Shirley Lagester	Oregon State Beavers	5 ft 5 in (1.65 m)
6th	Carol Ammerman	Texas Woman's Pioneers	5 ft 5 in (1.65 m)

Long jump
Pl.	Name	Team	Mark
1st place, gold medalist(s)	Vickie Betts	Cal State Los Angeles Golden Eagles	19 ft 2 1/4 in (5.84 m)
2nd place, silver medalist(s)	Marilyn King	Cal State East Bay Pioneers	18 ft 9 1/2 in (5.72 m)
3rd place, bronze medalist(s)	Cathy Cooper	Illinois State Redbirds	18 ft 4 in (5.58 m)
4th	Lisa Chiavario	New Mexico Lobos	18 ft 1 in (5.51 m)
5th	Lucia Vaamonde	Denver CityHawks	17 ft 10 in (5.43 m)
6th	Alicia Jones	Washington Huskies	17 ft 8 in (5.38 m)

Shot put
Pl.	Name	Team	Mark
1st place, gold medalist(s)	Lynette Matthews	Seattle Pacific Falcons	47 ft 8 in (14.52 m)
2nd place, silver medalist(s)	Mary Jacobson	Kansas Jayhawks	44 ft 6 1/4 in (13.56 m)
3rd place, bronze medalist(s)	Beth Smith	Oregon State Beavers	43 ft 6 1/2 in (13.27 m)
4th	Iva Wright	Fresno State Bulldogs	41 ft 7 1/4 in (12.68 m)
5th	Karen Botts	Oregon State Beavers	40 ft 9 1/4 in (12.42 m)
6th	Bonnie Williams	Flathead Valley Mountainettes	40 ft 8 1/2 in (12.4 m)

Discus throw
Pl.	Name	Team	Mark
1st place, gold medalist(s)	Lynette Matthews	Seattle Pacific Falcons	152 ft 10 in (46.58 m)
2nd place, silver medalist(s)	Linda Langford	San Jose State Spartans	151 ft 10 in (46.27 m)
3rd place, bronze medalist(s)	Iva Wright	Fresno State Bulldogs	141 ft 10 in (43.23 m)
4th	Barbara Butler	New Mexico Lobos	139 ft 7 in (42.54 m)
5th	Mary Jacobson	Kansas Jayhawks	137 ft 3 in (41.83 m)
6th	Beth Smith	Oregon State Beavers	130 ft 3 in (39.7 m)

Javelin throw
Pl.	Name	Team	Mark
1st place, gold medalist(s)	Barbara Pickel	Cal State East Bay Pioneers	164 ft 3 in (50.06 m)
2nd place, silver medalist(s)	Linda Langford	San Jose State Spartans	150 ft 7 in (45.89 m)
3rd place, bronze medalist(s)	Sherry Stripling	Western Washington Vikings	143 ft 4 in (43.68 m)
4th	Carry Burrell	Central Washington Wildcats	142 ft 2 in (43.33 m)
5th	Cheryl Patterson	Western Oregon Wolves	141 ft 8 in (43.18 m)
6th	Ginny Walker	Texas Woman's Pioneers	137 ft 3 in (41.83 m)

Pentathlon (Note: Only five competitors)
Pl.	Name	Team	Mark
1st place, gold medalist(s)	Jane Frederick	Colorado Buffaloes	3870 pts
2nd place, silver medalist(s)	Beth Miller	Lock Haven Bald Eagles	3375 pts
3rd place, bronze medalist(s)	Kathy Stephens	Western Oregon Wolves	2926 pts
4th	Barbara Mason	UC Davis Aggies	2383 pts
5th	Jan Little	Texas Woman's Pioneers	2290 pts

4 × 110 yards relay
Pl.	Name	Team	Mark
1st place, gold medalist(s)	Arnell Johnson	Texas Woman's Pioneers	46.7
1st place, gold medalist(s)	Merilyn McClung	Texas Woman's Pioneers	46.7
1st place, gold medalist(s)	Rochelle Davis	Texas Woman's Pioneers	46.7
1st place, gold medalist(s)	Audrey Reid	Texas Woman's Pioneers	46.7
2nd place, silver medalist(s)		Illinois Fighting Illini	48.7
3rd place, bronze medalist(s)		Flathead Valley Mountainettes	49.0
4th		Chico State Wildcats	49.8
5th		Cal State East Bay Pioneers	49.9
6th		Oregon State Beavers	50.3

4 × 440 yards relay
Pl.	Name	Team	Mark
1st place, gold medalist(s)	Marilyn McClung	Texas Woman's Pioneers	4:00.1
1st place, gold medalist(s)	Rosie Orta	Texas Woman's Pioneers	4:00.1
1st place, gold medalist(s)	Arnell Johnson	Texas Woman's Pioneers	4:00.1
1st place, gold medalist(s)	Kathy Sellers	Texas Woman's Pioneers	4:00.1
2nd place, silver medalist(s)		UC Davis Aggies	4:01.2
3rd place, bronze medalist(s)	Marti Adams	Missouri State Lady Bears	4:04.9
3rd place, bronze medalist(s)	Vicki Malin	Missouri State Lady Bears	4:04.9
3rd place, bronze medalist(s)	Mary Gunn	Missouri State Lady Bears	4:04.9
3rd place, bronze medalist(s)	Mary Phyl Dwight	Missouri State Lady Bears	4:04.9
4th	Joyce Urish	Kansas State Wildcats	4:06.8
4th	Carol Goering	Kansas State Wildcats	4:06.8
4th	Dee Duffey	Kansas State Wildcats	4:06.8
4th	Peggy Johns	Kansas State Wildcats	4:06.8
5th		Oregon Ducks	4:08.1
6th		Chico State Wildcats	4:12.7

Sprint medley relay (Note: Held at a total distance of 880 yards, with the first leg running 220 yards, the middle two legs running 110 yards, and the anchor leg running 440 yards.)
Pl.	Name	Team	Mark
1st place, gold medalist(s)		Cal State Los Angeles Golden Eagles	1:47.8
2nd place, silver medalist(s)		UC Davis Aggies	1:49.8
3rd place, bronze medalist(s)		Cal State East Bay Pioneers	1:50.4
4th		Western Washington Vikings	1:50.8
5th		Texas Woman's Pioneers	1:51.1
6th		Baylor Bears	1:51.8

== See also ==
- Association for Intercollegiate Athletics for Women championships § Outdoor track and field
- 1973 NCAA Division I Outdoor Track and Field Championships
