= Pioneer Hall (Texas Woman's University) =

Building on the campus of Texas Woman's University in Denton, Texas

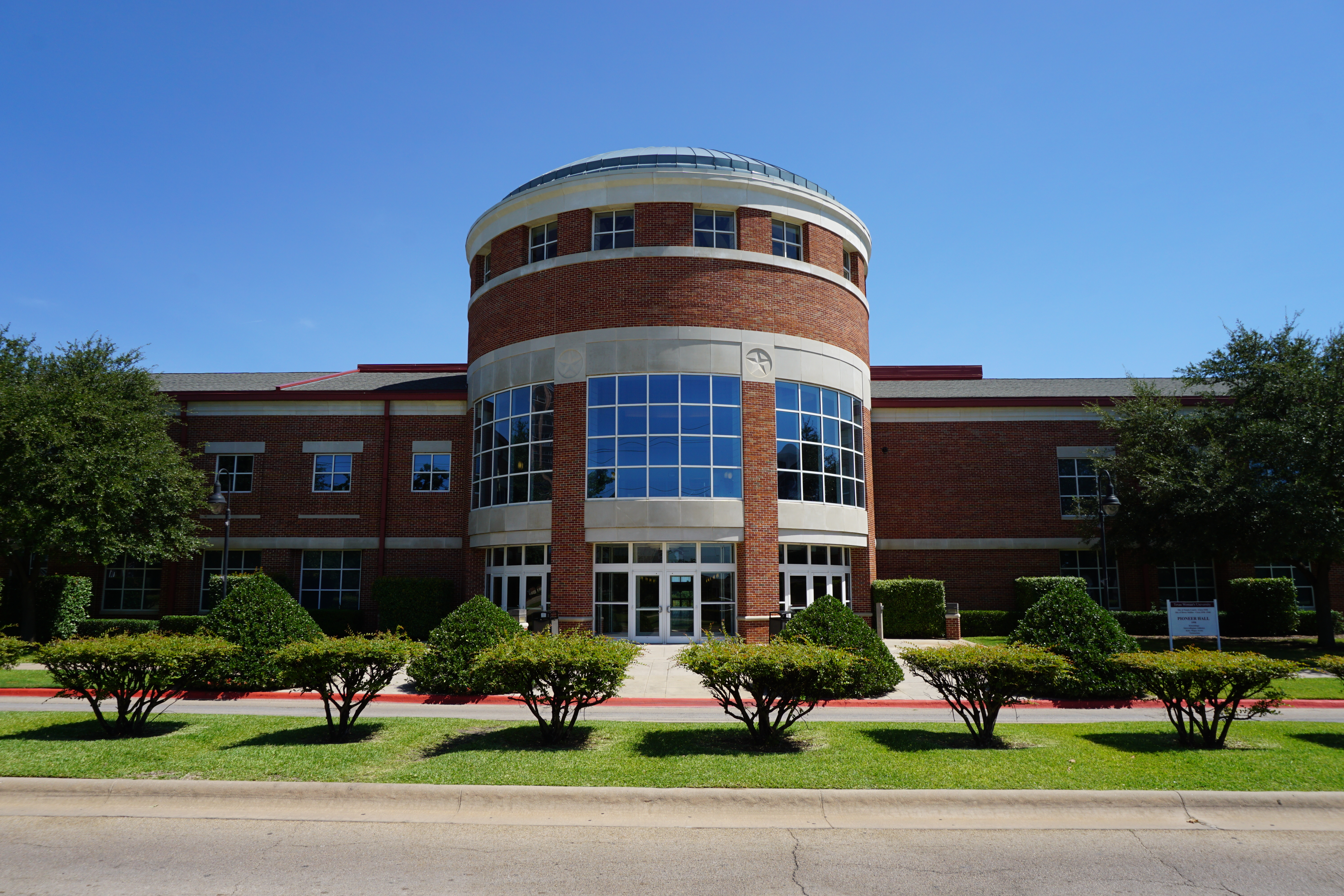
- The exterior of Pioneer Hall in 2015
- Interactive map of Pioneer Hall
- Location: Denton, Texas
- Coordinates: 33.227687°N 97.12671°W
- Owner: Texas Woman's University
- Operator: Texas Woman's University
- Capacity: 1,800–2,700

Construction
- Groundbreaking: 1996
- Opened: 1997

Tenants
- Texas Woman's Pioneers (basketball, gymnastics, and volleyball)

Pioneer Hall is a building on the campus of Texas Woman's University in Denton, Texas, that is the home of the TWU Pioneers basketball, gymnastics, and volleyball teams as well as numerous fitness facilities, classrooms, and offices.

Groundbreaking occurred on March 8, 1996, and the $15.5 million facility was completed by spring 1997. It was dedicated in 1998, and, as of 2013, was the most recently constructed building on TWU's campus. The facility was designed as a three-story, 140,000-square-foot (13,000 m^{2}) brick building that features a prominent gray-domed rotunda.

Pioneer Hall is the home of Kitty Magee Arena, a multipurpose gymnasium that hosts the University's intercollegiate basketball, gymnastics, and volleyball teams. The Arena also hosts other athletic events, including TWU intramural and recreational sports, high school basketball and volleyball, and summer camps. In addition, it is the site of TWU's commencement ceremonies. Magee Arena's standard seating capacity is 1,800, although this can be increased up to 2,700. The facility, which was named in honor of TWU athletics innovator Kitty Winter Magee, has been renovated twice; in 2005, when new lighting was installed, and in 2009, when its floor was replaced.

Pioneer Hall also includes an indoor swimming pool, racquetball courts, and a running track, in addition to serving as the home of TWU's Kinesiology Department. Other TWU departments and programs housed in the building include Conference Services, Dance, and Fitness and Recreation. Its fitness facilities are available to TWU students without charge and are also open to fee-paying members of the public.

In addition to Magee Arena and the swimming pool, the first floor includes an athletic training room, team locker rooms, and classrooms (including seminar rooms). The second floor is home to TWU's Intercollegiate Athletics offices as well as the Department of Kinesiology; also on the second floor are academic offices, additional classrooms, the racquetball courts, a climbing wall, and a weight room. The third floor features two large aerobics and dance studios.
