= Ibrahim Juma (runner) =

Tanzanian long-distance runner

Personal information
- Full name: Ibrahim Juma Kivina
- Nationality: Tanzanian
- Born: 25 February 1958 (age 68)

Sport
- Sport: Long-distance running
- Event: 10,000 metres

Ibrahim Juma Kivina (born 25 February 1958) is a Tanzanian long-distance runner. He competed in the men's 10,000 metres at the 1984 Summer Olympics.

Kivina qualified for the 1972 Olympics at age 15 but was not ultimately selected, and he qualified for the 1976 Olympics at age 19 but did not compete due to an African boycott. He was an All-American runner for the New Mexico Lobos track and field team, placing runner-up in the 10,000 metres at the 1984 NCAA Division I Outdoor Track and Field Championships.
