= Christine McMiken =

New Zealand track and field athlete

Christine McMiken Speir
Personal information
- Born: 19 June 1963 (age 63) Christchurch, New Zealand
- Education: BA, MA, Oklahoma State University
- Height: 165 cm (5 ft 5 in)
- Weight: 47 kg (104 lb)
- Spouse: Jon Speir (m. 1991)

Sport
- Sport: Athletics
- University team: Oklahoma State Cowgirls

Christine Maree McMiken Speir (born 19 June 1963) is a New Zealand former track and field athlete. She competed at the 1988 Summer Olympics in the Women's 10000 metres event. McMiken became the first Oklahoma State individual national champion in 1985, when she won the 3000 meters at the NCAA Division I Indoor Track and Field Championships title.

== Personal life ==
McMiken was born on 19 June 1963 in New Zealand. She was a multi-sport athlete while attending Diocesan School for Girls, competing in volleyball, netball, cross-country, and floor hockey. While in high school, she represented New Zealand in cross-country tournaments against Australia. Her running coach, Arthur Lydiard, encouraged her to apply to post-secondary schools in the United States and wrote to track and field coach Dick Weis at the University of Missouri. However, McMiken was not accepted to the school after failing to meet all the entrance criteria required of foreign students. After becoming the head coach of the Oklahoma State Cowgirls track and field team, Weis recruited McMiken to the school.

== Career ==
As a freshman at Oklahoma State University (OSU), McMiken set five school running records and placed sixth in the Big Eight indoor three-mile run. Since she joined OSU mid-year, she was still considered a sophomore in the 1984 cross country season. As a sophomore, she won the Big Eight indoor three-mile with a time of 15:41.5 and captured indoor All-America honors. She also set a school record at the Arkansas Invitational with a time of 16:20. At the 1984 NCAA Division I cross country championships, McMiken finished third in the 5,000 meters race with a time of 16:30. As such, she became the first Oklahoma State woman to earn All-America honors in cross country.

McMiken set numerous records in her junior year, including setting a meet and school record at the 3000 meters at the NCAA Division I Indoor Track and Field Championships. During the 1985 indoor season, McMiken set a world record of 14:53.80 at the Big 8 three-mile championships. After completing the Big Eight outdoor track season in June, McMiken took a short break from competing. She returned for the Rainbow Couples Classic road race and finished with the second-fastest time in any eight-kilometre race in the United States during the 1985 season.

McMiken was inducted into the OSU Athletic Hall of Honor in 2006.

== Personal life ==
McMiken married fellow New Zealander Jon Speir in 1991.
