= Association for Intercollegiate Athletics for Women championships =

US women's college sports association

The Association for Intercollegiate Athletics for Women was founded in 1971 to govern collegiate women's athletics and to administer national championships. During its existence, the AIAW and its predecessor, the Division for Girls' and Women's Sports (DGWS), recognized via these championships the teams and individuals who excelled at the highest level of women's collegiate competition.

After the 1981–82 academic year, the AIAW discontinued sponsorship of national championships and later was legally dissolved. At this time, the NCAA assumed sole sanctioning authority of its member schools' women's sports programs.

== Governing bodies of women's collegiate athletics through 1982 ==
Women's intercollegiate athletics were organized on a national basis in 1941, the year the first national collegiate championship was held in the sport of golf by the "Division for Girls' and Women's Sports" (DGWS) of the American Association for Health, Physical Education and Recreation (AAHPER). The DGWS was the first nationally recognized collegiate multi-sport organization for women's athletics and the forerunner of the AIAW. (Note: In the U.S. there were earlier organizations formed in the 1920s for women's intercollegiate competition in track and field and fencing. In England, the Women's Inter-Varsity Athletics Board (WIVAB) was formed to govern inter-varsity track and field competition for women in 1923.) The Commission on Intercollegiate Athletics for Women (CIAW) operated under the auspices of the DGWS. The CIAW governed from 1966 until February, 1972, and conducted championships in eight sports.

During the 1972–73 season, the first full academic year of its operation, the AIAW offered its first eight national championships in the same eight sports (badminton, basketball, golf, gymnastics, softball, swimming & diving, track & field, and volleyball).

In years when small-college championships (Division II or III) were not contested, and in sports without divisions, there was open competition among eligible teams.

Except as noted below, the NCAA sponsored its first women's championship in each sport in the 1981–82 academic year. Individual athletic programs and, in some cases, individual teams within a program were permitted to choose to participate in either the AIAW or NCAA competitions (or both in a few instances). The NCAA has never sponsored championship competition in badminton, synchronized swimming, or slow-pitch softball.

In the sports of fencing, lacrosse, rowing and tennis, for completeness, the champions listed below include those bestowed by each sport's governing body prior to the beginning of AIAW championships in those sports.

Compilations of collegiate records by the NCAA, continuing into 2006, have ignored or segregated the contributions of AIAW athletes. Major college basketball's career women's scoring leader, Lynette Woodard of the University of Kansas, speaking on the exclusion of AIAW statistics, said, "Basketball doesn't just start with when the NCAA blessed it. And it's not about Jackie [Stiles, NCAA career scoring leader] and it's not about Lynette. It's about history. History is history."

== Sports with AIAW/DGWS team championships by year ==
Year	Badminton	Basketball	Cross country	Fencing	Field hockey	Golf	Gymnastics	Lacrosse	Rowing	Skiing	Soccer	Softball	Slow-pitch softball	Swimming & diving	Synchronized swimming	Tennis	Track & field (Indoor)	Track & field (Outdoor)	Volleyball	Total
1967–68	✗	✗	✗	✗	✗	✗	✗	✗	✗	✗	✗	✗	✗	✓	✗	✗	✗	✗	✗	1
1968–69	✗	✓	✗	✗	✗	✗	✓	✗	✗	✗	✗	✓	✗	✓	✗	✗	✗	✓	✗	5
1969–70	✓	✓	✗	✗	✗	✓	✓	✗	✗	✗	✗	✓	✗	✓	✗	✗	✗	✓	✓	8
1970–71	✓	✓	✗	✗	✗	✓	✓	✗	✗	✗	✗	✓	✗	✓	✗	✗	✗	✓	✓	8
1971–72	✓	✓	✗	✗	✗	✓	✓	✗	✗	✗	✗	✓	✗	✓	✗	✗	✗	✓	✓	8
1972–73	✓	✓	✗	✗	✗	✓	✓	✗	✗	✗	✗	✓	✗	✓	✗	✗	✗	✓	✓	8
1973–74	✓	✓	✗	✗	✗	✓	✓	✗	✗	✗	✗	✓	✗	✓	✗	✗	✗	✓	✓	8
1974–75	✓	✓	✗	✗	✗	✓	✓	✗	✗	✗	✗	✓	✗	✓	✗	✗	✗	✓	✓	8
1975–76	✓	✓	✓	✗	✓	✓	✓	✗	✗	✗	✗	✓	✗	✓	✗	✗	✗	✓	✓	10
1976–77	✓	✓	✓	✗	✓	✓	✓	✗	✗	✓	✗	✓	✗	✓	✓	✓	✗	✓	✓	13
1977–78	✓	✓	✓	✗	✓	✓	✓	✗	✗	✓	✗	✓	✗	✓	✓	✓	✗	✓	✓	13
1978–79	✓	✓	✓	✗	✓	✓	✓	✗	✗	✓	✗	✓	✗	✓	✓	✓	✗	✓	✓	13
1979–80	✓	✓	✓	✓	✓	✓	✓	✗	✗	✓	✗	✓	✗	✓	✓	✓	✓	✓	✓	15
1980–81	✓	✓	✓	✓	✓	✓	✓	✓	✗	✓	✗	✓	✓	✓	✓	✓	✓	✓	✓	17
1981–82	✓	✓	✓	✓	✓	✓	✓	✓	✓	✓	✓	✓	✓	✓	✓	✓	✓	✓	✓	19
Totals	13	14	7	3	7	13	14	2	1	6	1	14	2	15	6	6	3	14	13	154

== Badminton ==
AIAW championship 1973–82. Previously administered by the Division of Girls' and Women's Sports (DGWS).

- 1970 Long Beach State (DGWS)
- 1971 Arizona State (DGWS)
- 1972 Pasadena City College (DGWS)
- 1973 Pasadena City College
- 1974 Long Beach State
- 1975 Arizona State
- 1976 Arizona State
- 1977 UCLA
- 1978 Arizona State
- 1979 Arizona State
- 1980 Arizona State
- 1981 Arizona State
- 1982 Northern Illinois

After the last AIAW competition, collegiate badminton assumed the authority of its own national tournament committee in conjunction with the United States Badminton Association. The USBA continued the sponsorship of national collegiate championships from 1983. Wisconsin won in 1983. Arizona State won all ten titles from 1984 through 1993, when ASU dropped badminton.

== Basketball ==
Pre-NCAA statistics, based on AIAW Archives, Special Collections, University of Maryland Libraries.

=== Division I (no division 1968–1974, Large College 1974–1979) ===
AIAW championship 1972–82. Previously administered by the Commission on Intercollegiate Athletics for Women (CIAW).

- 1969 West Chester (Pennsylvania) def. Western Carolina 65-39 (CIAW invitational tournament, six player format)
- 1970 Cal State-Fullerton def. West Chester 50-46 (CIAW invitational tournament, six player format)
- 1971 Mississippi State College for Women def. West Chester 57-55 (CIAW qualification tournament)
- 1972 Immaculata (Pennsylvania) def. West Chester 52-48
- 1973 Immaculata def. Queens (New York) 59-52
- 1974 Immaculata def. Mississippi College 68-53
- 1975 Delta State (Mississippi) def. Immaculata 90-81
- 1976 Delta State def. Immaculata 69-64
- 1977 Delta State def. LSU 68-55
- 1978 UCLA def. Maryland 90-74
- 1979 Old Dominion def. Louisiana Tech 75-65
- 1980 Old Dominion def. Tennessee 68-53
- 1981 Louisiana Tech def. Tennessee 79-59
- 1982 Rutgers def. Texas 83-77

=== Division II (Small College 1974–1979) ===
- 1975 Phillips University (Oklahoma)
- 1976 Berry College (Georgia)
- 1977 Southeastern Louisiana
- 1978 High Point (North Carolina)
- 1979 South Carolina State
- 1980 University of Dayton
- 1981 William Penn College (Iowa)
- 1982 Francis Marion College (South Carolina)

=== Division III ===
- 1980 Worcester State College (Massachusetts)
- 1981 Wisconsin–La Crosse
- 1982 Concordia College (Minnesota)

=== Junior/Community College ===
- 1973 Mississippi Gulf Coast Junior College
- 1974 Anderson College (South Carolina)
- 1975 Anderson College
- 1976 Anderson College
- 1977 Anderson College

== Cross country ==
=== Division I (no division 1975–1979) ===
- 1975 Iowa State
- 1976 Iowa State
- 1977 Iowa State
- 1978 Iowa State
- 1979 North Carolina State
- 1980 North Carolina State
- 1981 Iowa State

=== Division II ===
- 1979 Air Force (Colorado)
- 1980 South Dakota State
- 1981 Utah

=== Division III ===
- 1979 Cal State-Hayward
- 1980 Cal State-Hayward
- 1981 College of St. Thomas (Minnesota)

== Fencing ==
AIAW championship 1980–82. Previously administered by the National Intercollegiate Women's Fencing Association. The IWFA became the National IWFA in 1964 and called for a National Championship.

- 1964 Paterson State (New Jersey)
- 1965 Paterson State
- 1966 Paterson State
- 1967 Cornell
- 1968 Cornell
- 1969 Cornell
- 1970 Hunter College (New York)
- 1971 NYU
- 1972 Cornell
- 1973 Cornell
- 1974 Cal State Fullerton
- 1975 San Jose State
- 1976 San Jose State
- 1977 San Jose State
- 1978 San Jose State
- 1979 San Jose State

AIAW, 1980–1982:

- 1980 Penn State
- 1981 Penn State
- 1982 Yale

The NIWFA has continued to sponsor national collegiate championships from 1983 through the present. From 1990 through the present the NCAA has sponsored a combined men's and women's team championship. Effective in 2026 the NCAA men’s and women’s championships were again separated.

== Field Hockey ==
=== Division I (no division 1975–1979) ===
Co-sponsored 1975–78 by the United States Field Hockey Association (USFHA).

- 1975 West Chester (Pennsylvania) def. Ursinus (Pennsylvania) 2-1 (penalty strokes)
- 1976 West Chester def. Ursinus 2-0
- 1977 West Chester def. Ursinus 1-0
- 1978 West Chester def. Delaware 3-2
- 1979 Long Beach State def. Penn State 2-0
- 1980 Penn State def. California 2-1
- 1981 Penn State def. Temple (Pennsylvania) 5-1

=== Division II ===
- 1979 Southwest Missouri State def. Colgate (New York) 2-0
- 1980 La Salle (Pennsylvania) def. Southwest Missouri State 3-2
- 1981 Lock Haven (Pennsylvania) def. Syracuse 2-0

=== Division III ===
- 1979 Shippensburg (Pennsylvania) def. Franklin & Marshall (Pennsylvania) 1-0
- 1980 Gettysburg (Pennsylvania) def. Hartwick (New York) 1-0 (ps)
- 1981 Bloomsburg (Pennsylvania) def. Lynchburg (Virginia) 3-2

== Golf ==
=== Division I (no division 1970–1980) ===
==== Team ====
- 1970 Miami (Florida) (DGWS)
- 1971 UCLA (DGWS)
- 1972 Miami
- 1973 UNC Greensboro (two player teams)
- 1974 Rollins (Florida)
- 1975 Arizona State
- 1976 Furman
- 1977 Miami
- 1978 Miami
- 1979 SMU
- 1980 Tulsa
- 1981 Florida State
- 1982 Tulsa

==== Individual ====
Gladys Palmer from Ohio State University initiated the women's intercollegiate golf championship in 1941. After World War II, the DGWS, known as the National Section on Women's Sports until 1957, crowned an individual collegiate golf national champion from 1946 through 1971, when it became an AIAW event.

Year	Winner	School	Venue host
1941	Eleanor Dudley	Alabama	Ohio State
1946	Phyllis Otto	Northwestern	Ohio State
1947	Shirley Spork	Michigan State Normal College	Ohio State
1948	Grace Lenczyk	Stetson (Florida)	Ohio State
1949	Marilynn Smith	Kansas	Ohio State
1950	Betty Rowland	Rollins College (Florida)	Ohio State
1951	Barbara Bruning	Wellesley College (Massachusetts)	Ohio State
1952	Mary Ann Villega	Ohio State	Ohio State
1953	Patricia Lesser	Seattle	North Carolina
1954	Nancy Reed	George Peabody College (Tennessee)	North Carolina
1955	Jackie Yates	Redlands (California)	Lake Forest College
1956	Marlene Stewart	Rollins College	Purdue
1957	Meriam Bailey	Northwestern	Illinois
1958	Carole Pushing	Carleton College (Minnesota)	Iowa State
1959	Judy Eller	Miami	North Carolina
1960	JoAnne Gunderson	Arizona State	Stanford
1961	Judy Hoetmer	Washington	Michigan
1962	Carol Sorenson	Arizona State	New Mexico
1963	Claudia Lindor	Western Washington	Penn State
1964	Patti Shook	Valparaiso (Indiana)	Michigan State
1965	Roberta Albers	Miami	Florida
1966	Joyce Kazmierski	Michigan State	Ohio State
1967	Martha Wilkinson	Cal State Fullerton	Washington
1968	Gail Sykes	Odessa College (Texas)	Duke
1969	Jane Bastanchury	Arizona State	Penn State
1970	Cathy Gaughan	Arizona State	San Diego State
1971	Shelley Hamlin	Stanford	Georgia
1972	Ann Laughlin	Miami	New Mexico State
1973	Bonnie Lauer	Michigan State	Mt. Holyoke College
1974	Mary Budke	Oregon State	San Diego State
1975	Barbara Barrow (Note: won 3-hole tie-breaking playoff against Deborah Simourian of Wheaton College (Massachusetts))	San Diego State	Arizona
1976	Nancy Lopez	Tulsa	Michigan State
1977	Cathy Morse	Miami	Hawaiʻi
1978	Deborah Petrizzi	Texas	Florida
1979	Kyle O'Brien	Southern Methodist	Oklahoma State
1980	Patty Sheehan	San Jose State	New Mexico
1981	Terri Moody	Georgia	Georgia
1982	Amy Benz	Southern Methodist	Ohio State

=== Division II ===
==== Team ====
- 1981 William and Mary (Virginia)
- 1982 Weber State (Utah)

==== Individual ====
- 1981 Susan Fox, Colorado State
- 1982 Heidi Wallin, Weber State

=== Division III ===
==== Team ====
- 1981 Sacramento State
- 1982 UNC Wilmington

==== Individual ====
- 1981 Kris Elton, Concordia College (New York)
- 1982 Luann Johnson, Meredith College (North Carolina)

== Gymnastics ==
=== Division I (no division 1968–1977, Large College 1977–1979) ===
- 1969 Springfield College (Massachusetts) (DGWS)
- 1970 Southern Illinois (DGWS)
- 1971 Springfield College (DGWS)
- 1972 Springfield College (DGWS)
- 1973 Massachusetts
- 1974 Southern Illinois
- 1975 Southern Illinois
- 1976 Clarion State (Pennsylvania)
- 1977 Clarion State
- 1978 Penn State
- 1979 Cal State Fullerton
- 1980 Penn State
- 1981 Utah
- 1982 Florida

=== Division II (Small College 1977–1979) ===
- 1978 Centenary (Louisiana)
- 1979 Centenary
- 1980 Centenary
- 1981 Centenary
- 1982 Denver

=== Division III ===
- 1980 Wisconsin–Oshkosh
- 1981 UC Davis
- 1982 Gustavus Adolphus College (Minnesota)

== Lacrosse ==
=== Division I ===
AIAW championship 1981–82. Administered 1978–80 by the United States Women's Lacrosse Association (USWLA).

- 1978 Penn State def. Maryland 9-3
- 1979 Penn State def. Massachusetts 8-5
- 1980 Penn State def. Maryland 3-1
- 1981 Maryland def. Ursinus 5-4
- 1982 Temple (Pennsylvania) def. Maryland 3-2

=== Division II ===
- 1981 Delaware
- 1982 Delaware

=== Division III ===
- 1981 Trenton State (New Jersey)
- 1982 Millersville State (Pennsylvania)

== Rowing ==
Only AIAW championship was in 1982. The National Women's Rowing Association (NWRA) sponsored an annual open eights national championship from 1971 to 1979, among college and non-college teams. (There were no eights prior to 1971.) During this period, only in 1973 and 1975 did a college team win the national eights championship outright. According to USRowing, contemporary news reports in 1976 and 1977 do not mention a national collegiate title. Beginning in 1980, the NWRA sponsored the Women's Collegiate National Championship in varsity eights.

NWRA Open Eights top college finishers, 1971–1979 (champion in parentheses):

- 1971 Washington (first place: Vesper Boat Club)
- 1972 Washington (first place: College Boat Club)
- 1973 Radcliffe (NWRA open champion)
- 1974 Radcliffe (first place: Vesper Boat Club)
- 1975 Wisconsin (NWRA open champion)
- 1976 Wisconsin (first place: College Boat Club)
- 1977 Wisconsin (first place: Vesper Boat Club)
- 1978 Wisconsin (first place: Burnaby Boat Club)
- 1979 Yale (first place: Burnaby BC)

National Collegiate Varsity Eight Champions, 1980–1982:

- 1980 California
- 1981 Washington
- 1982 Washington (AIAW Champion)

1982 Rowing Event	Winner
Varsity 8	Washington
Varsity 4	Pennsylvania
Lightweight 8	Harvard
Lightweight 4	Minnesota
Novice 8	Boston University
Novice 4	Minnesota
2nd Varsity 8	Washington

Additional notes:

- A medalist in the 1975 NWRA regatta stated that the 1975 regatta was the 10th annual national women's rowing championship, as emblazoned on T-shirts from the event.
- One citation from 1996 states, "(The Cal Women's Crew) in 1979 finished second in the U.S. National Collegiate Championships. ... The 1980 Cal Women's Crew dominated the National Championships, ... They won the varsity eight, Cal's first ever varsity national championship in any women's sport."
- One citation from 1999 states, "1980. First Women's Collegiate Rowing Championship held in Oak Ridge, TN."
- One citation from 2001 states, " Just seven years after its first race, the (Yale) women's team claimed its first national championship in 1979."
- After the last AIAW competition, the National Collegiate Rowing Championship was held from 1983 through 1996. Washington won the varsity eight in 1983, 1984, 1985, 1987, and 1988. Wisconsin won in 1986. Cornell won in 1989. Princeton won in 1990, 1993, 1994 and 1995. Boston University won in 1991 and 1992. Brown won in 1996.
- From 1997 through the present the NCAA has sponsored the women's collegiate rowing championship.

== Skiing ==
- 1977 Dartmouth (New Hampshire)
- 1978 Utah
- 1979 Middlebury (Vermont)
- 1980 Middlebury
- 1981 Vermont
- 1982 Colorado

From 1983 through the present the NCAA has sponsored a combined men's and women's team championship.

== Soccer ==
- 1980 Cortland State (New York) def. UCLA 5-1
- 1981 North Carolina def. Central Florida 1-0

The 1980 tournament was not officially sanctioned by the AIAW. North Carolina, Harvard, Texas A&M, UCLA, Cortland State, Northern Colorado and Colorado State participated. One reason for the tournament was to earn an official sanction for the sport, by complying with and fulfilling guidelines set forth by the AIAW.

From Fall 1982 through the present the NCAA has sponsored a women's championship.

== Fastpitch softball ==
=== Division I (no division 1969–1979) ===
Women's College World Series

From 1969 to 1982, the women's collegiate softball championship was also known as the Women's College World Series and was promoted as such. The Women's College World Series was played in Omaha, Nebraska, through 1979 and in Norman, Oklahoma, during 1980–1982.

AIAW championship 1973–82. Previously administered by the Amateur Softball Association and sanctioned by DGWS from 1969 to 1972. Co-sponsored by the AIAW and ASA through 1979.

- 1969 John F. Kennedy (Nebraska) (DGWS)
- 1970 John F. Kennedy (DGWS)
- 1971 John F. Kennedy (DGWS)
- 1972 Arizona State (DGWS)
- 1973 Arizona State
- 1974 Southwest Missouri State
- 1975 Nebraska–Omaha
- 1976 Michigan State
- 1977 Northern Iowa
- 1978 UCLA
- 1979 Texas Woman's
- 1980 Utah State
- 1981 Utah State
- 1982 Texas A&M

=== Division II ===
- 1980 Emporia State (Kansas)
- 1981 Sacramento State
- 1982 Northern Iowa

=== Division III ===
- 1980 Cal State Chico
- 1981 Eastern Connecticut State
- 1982 Bloomsburg State (Pennsylvania)

=== Junior/Community College ===
- 1975 Golden West (California) def. Northeastern Colorado 22-0 (5 inn, mercy), perfect game
- 1976 Golden West
- 1977 Golden West

== Slowpitch softball ==
- 1981 Florida State
- 1982 Florida State

After the last AIAW competition, collegiate national championships in slow-pitch softball were conducted in 1983 and 1984 by the Amateur Softball Association. The University of South Florida won both. It appears that most of the college women's slow-pitch teams at that time were from Florida and North Carolina.

== Swimming and diving ==
=== Division I (no division 1968–1976, Large College 1977–1979) ===
- 1968 Arizona State (DGWS)
- 1969 Arizona State (DGWS)
- 1970 Arizona State (DGWS)
- 1971 Arizona State (DGWS)
- 1972 West Chester State (Pennsylvania) (DGWS)
- 1973 Arizona State
- 1974 Arizona State
- 1975 Miami
- 1976 Miami
- 1977 Arizona State
- 1978 Arizona State
- 1979 Florida
- 1980 Stanford
- 1981 Texas
- 1982 Texas

=== Division II (Small College 1977–1979) ===
- 1977 Clarion State (Pennsylvania)
- 1978 Clarion State
- 1979 Nevada-Reno
- 1980 Clarion State
- 1981 Clarion State
- 1982 Clarion State

=== Division III ===
- 1980 Hamline (Minnesota)
- 1981 Hamline
- 1982 Hamline

== Synchronized swimming ==
- 1977 Ohio State
- 1978 Ohio State
- 1979 Ohio State
- 1980 Ohio State, Arizona (tie)
- 1981 Arizona
- 1982 Ohio State

USA Artistic Swimming has continued to sponsor national collegiate championships from 1983 through the present. From 1983 through 2004, Ohio State won 19 of the 22 titles. Arizona won in 1984. Stanford won in 1998, 1999, 2005 through 2008, 2013, 2016, 2021, 2025 and 2026. Ohio State won in 2009 through 2012, 2015, 2017, 2018, 2019, 2022, and 2023. Lindenwood won in 2014. Incarnate Word won in 2024.

== Tennis ==
=== Division I (no division 1968–1976, Large College 1977–1979) ===
AIAW championship 1977–82. Team championships were also bestowed from 1967 to 1979 by the United States Lawn Tennis Association (USLTA). From 1958 to 1979, the USLTA also crowned individual collegiate national champions in singles and doubles. (The 1979 USLTA team award appears to have been based on the AIAW results.)

- 1967 Odessa College (Texas), Stanford (tie)
- 1968 Trinity (San Antonio)
- 1969 Trinity (San Antonio)
- 1970 Odessa College
- 1971 Arizona State
- 1972 Arizona State
- 1973 Trinity (San Antonio)
- 1974 Arizona State
- 1975 Trinity (San Antonio)
- 1976 Trinity (San Antonio)
- 1977 USC ‡
- 1978 Stanford ‡
- 1979 USC
- 1980 USC
- 1981 UCLA
- 1982 Indiana

‡ 1977, 1978 USLTA champion: USC

=== Division II (Small College 1977–1979) ===
- 1977 Tennessee-Chattanooga
- 1978 Tennessee-Chattanooga
- 1979 Tennessee-Chattanooga
- 1980 Cal Poly-Pomona
- 1981 Cal Poly-Pomona
- 1982 Richmond

=== Division III ===
- 1980 UC Davis
- 1981 UC Davis
- 1982 Mary Washington (Virginia)

=== Junior/Community College ===
- 1977 Indian River Community College

== Track and field ==
=== Indoor track and field ===
The first official AIAW indoor track and field championship was held in 1980. Invitational meets held in 1978 and 1979 served as unofficial championships.

AIAW indoor track and field championships
Edition	Date	Venue	Winner	Ref.
1st (Missouri National Invitational)	March 17-18, 1978	Columbia, Missouri	Wisconsin Badgers	
2nd (Missouri National Invitational)	March 2-3, 1979	Columbia, Missouri	Iowa State Cyclones	
3rd	March 7-8, 1980	Columbia, Missouri	UTEP Miners	
4th	March 13-14, 1981	Pocatello, Idaho	Virginia Cavaliers	
5th	March 12-13, 1982	Cedar Falls, Iowa	Nebraska Cornhuskers	

From 1983 through the present the NCAA has sponsored a women's team championship.

=== Outdoor track and field ===
==== Division I (no division 1969–1980) ====
DGWS and AIAW championships were held from 1969 to 1982. The first National Intercollegiate Track and Field Championship was sponsored by DGWS in the spring of 1969.

AIAW Division I outdoor track and field championships
Edition	Date	Venue	Winner	Ref.
1st (DGWS)	1969		Texas Woman's Pioneers	
2nd (DGWS)	1970		Illinois Fighting Illini	
3rd (DGWS)	1971		Texas Woman's Pioneers	
4th (DGWS)	1972		Cal State Hayward Pioneers	
5th	1973		Texas Woman's Pioneers	
6th	1974		Prairie View A&M Lady Panthers	
7th	1975		UCLA Bruins	
8th	1976		Prairie View A&M Lady Panthers	
9th	1977		UCLA Bruins	
10th	1978		Cal State Northridge Matadors	
11th	1979		Cal State Northridge Matadors	
12th	1980		Cal State Northridge Matadors	
13th	1981		Tennessee Lady Volunteers	
14th	1982		Texas Longhorns	

From 1982 through the present the NCAA has sponsored a women's team championship.

==== Division II ====
- 1981 Cal Poly San Luis Obispo
- 1982 South Carolina State

==== Division III ====
- 1981 Cal State-Hayward
- 1982 Wisconsin–La Crosse

== Volleyball ==
=== Division I (no division 1969–1974, Large College 1975–1978) ===
AIAW championship 1973–82. Previously administered by the Division of Girls' and Women's Sports (DGWS).

- 1969–70 Sul Ross State (Texas) def. UCLA (DGWS)
- 1970–71 Sul Ross State (Texas) def. Long Beach State (DGWS)
- 1971–72 UCLA def. Long Beach State (DGWS)
- 1972–73 Long Beach State def. Brigham Young
- 1973 Long Beach State def. Texas Woman's
- 1974 UCLA def. Hawaiʻi
- 1975 UCLA def. Hawaiʻi
- 1976 USC def. UCLA
- 1977 USC def. Hawaiʻi
- 1978 Utah State def. UCLA
- 1979 Hawaiʻi def. Utah State
- 1980 USC def. Pacific
- 1981 Texas def. Portland State

=== Division II (Small College 1975–1978) ===
- 1975 Texas Lutheran
- 1976 Texas Lutheran
- 1977 UC Riverside
- 1978 Florida Technological University (UCF)
- 1979 Hawaiʻi-Hilo
- 1980 Cal State Northridge
- 1981 Hawaiʻi-Hilo

=== Division III ===
- 1979 Azusa Pacific (California)
- 1980 Sacramento State
- 1981 La Verne (California)

=== Junior/Community College ===
- 1974 Eastern Arizona College
- 1975 Ricks College (Idaho)
- 1976 Mesa Community College (Arizona)
- 1977 Santa Ana College (California)

== Bowling ==
The USBC (formerly ABC/Women's International Bowling Congress) has conducted a women's intercollegiate bowling championship annually since 1975, although it was not an AIAW sport.

== Sources ==
- Archives of the Association for Intercollegiate Athletics for Women (AIAW), Special Collections, University of Maryland Libraries
- Virginia Hunt, "Governance of Women's Intercollegiate Athletics: an Historical Perspective," (Doctoral Dissertation, University of North Carolina - Greensboro, 1976), Ann Arbor, Michigan: University Microfilms (1977), 1-319
- Suzanne Willey, "The Governance of Women's Intercollegiate Athletics: Association for Intercollegiate Athletics for Women (AIAW), 1976–1982," (Thesis (P.E.D.), Indiana University, 1996), Eugene, Oregon: Microform Publications (1997), 1-351
- USA Field Hockey
- Women's Basketball Timeline 1890s-Present (pdf)
- Women's College Basketball Championship History Page ( 2009-10-24)
- USBC, Intercollegiate Team Championships
- NIFWA Team Champions
- Intercollegiate Tennis Association - The Milestones in Women's Collegiate Tennis
- The History of UCLA Women's Volleyball
- UW Women's Sports History, 1974–2004 (pdf-large)
- Trinity University Campus Spotlight, "Former Sports Standouts to be Inducted Into Trinity's Athletic Hall of Fame"
- Long Beach Press-Telegram,"It All Started in Long Beach," 12/15/2004
- Bio: Marilyn Nolen: Women's Volleyball
- Cougar Volleyball 99 (pdf-large)
- McPherson College Hall of Fame 2004, Kathy Rogers Yoder
- BRO Forums, "UCLA: 97 NCAA titles and counting...." (Caution: before referencing, confirm a second source)
- TWU Athletics Hall Of Fame Committee Seeks Nominations For 2006 Induction
- Texas Woman's University Athletics Hall of Fame Class of 2002
- "The Institutionalization of a Gender Biased Sport Value System," Everhart & Pemberton, Winter, 2001
- Northern Illinois University Athletics Hall of Fame
- History of Synchronized Swimming in the U.S.
- Buckeye Champions
- SMS softball recognizes 1974 national championship team 30th anniversary
- 2005 Sacramento State Hornets Softball Media Guide (pdf-large)
- "10 Most Memorable Moments in UNO Sports History"
- USTA supporting women's collegiate tennis for nearly half a century
- Alabama Women's Golf 2003-04, page 7 (pdf-large)
- "Nearly 150 years old, Yale crew embodies spirit of Eli sports," May 17, 2001
- California Golden Bears Women's Crew
- "A rowing legend moves on," April 15, 1998
- "Proposal To Add Women's Rowing As A Varsity Sport, University Of Colorado, Boulder"
- UCLA Bruins Traditions
- Rowing (From Alexander Leitch, A Princeton Companion, copyright Princeton University Press (1978))
- Men's & Women's Skiing Past Individual Champions
- Men's & Women's Fencing Past Champions
- "Stanford's Inferno Too Hot for Bucks"
- Women's Bowling Past Champions
- Women's Soccer Past Champions
- Men's & Women's Track & Field Indoor Champions
- Seminole Softball 2004 Media Guide, p 66 (pdf-large)
- National Fastpitch Coaches Association
- Wisconsin Women's Rowing 2005–2006 Media Guide - History and Results (pdf)
- Princeton Women's Rowing Record Book (pdf)
- The History of ASU Badminton (pdf)
- Sun Devil Swimming & Diving Program History
- Cornell Big Red - On Campus in the Nineties
- Colorado College Women's Soccer History
- History of Penn State Women's Lacrosse (pdf)
- 2007 Maryland Women's Lacrosse Media Guide (pdf)
- Wisconsin Badgers Athletics: A pretty good decade so far, BadgerBeat.com
