= Texas Woman's Pioneers =

Athletics teams of Texas Woman's University

- University: Texas Woman's University
- NCAA: Division II
- Conference: LSC (primary); Midwest Independent Conference (gymnastics)
- Athletic director: Sandee Mott
- Location: Denton, Texas
- Varsity teams: 9 (0 men's, 9 women's)
- Basketball arena: Kitty Magee Arena
- Softball stadium: Dianne Baker Field
- Soccer stadium: Pioneer Soccer Park
- Nickname: Pioneers
- Colors: Maroon and white
- Mascot: Oakley the Barn Owl
- Website: twuathletics.com
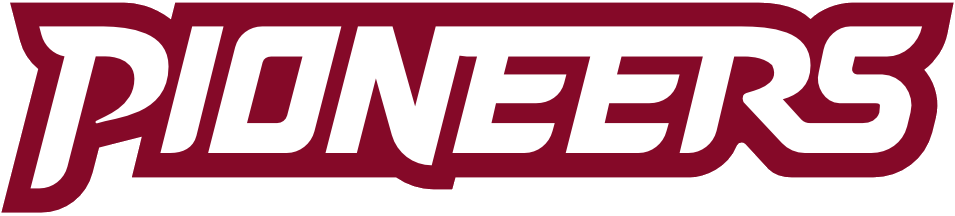

The Texas Woman's Pioneers (also TWU Pioneers) are the athletics teams that represent Texas Woman's University, located in Denton, Texas, in NCAA Division II intercollegiate sports. Even though TWU accepts male students, only female sports are sponsored. The Pioneers compete as members of the Lone Star Conference in basketball, soccer, softball and volleyball, and as an independent in gymnastics. The gymnastics team competes in the Midwest Independent Conference which comprises NCAA Division I, II and III institutions. TWU also fields teams in artistic swimming, dance, stunt, and wrestling.

== Sports sponsored ==
Texas Woman's Pioneers sports
Artistic Swim
Basketball
Dance
Gymnastics
Soccer
Softball
Stunt
Volleyball
Wrestling

=== Softball ===
As an AIAW Division I team in the 1979 Women's College World Series, the Pioneer softball team won the national championship by defeating UCLA, 1–0, in the deciding game, led by pitcher Kathy Arendsen.

=== Gymnastics ===
The TWU Gymnastics squad has won the USA Gymnastics Collegiate National Championships (non-NCAA) with a record 12 team championships since 1993, most recently in 2022. In 2025 the championship was renamed the Women's Collegiate Gymnastics National Invitational Championships, and TWU won the inaugural title. They repeated as champions in 2026. TWU is the only varsity-level intercollegiate gymnastics program in the state of Texas.

=== Track and field ===
TWU won three women's collegiate outdoor track-and-field national championships: in 1969, 1971, and 1973. These included the first (and three of the first five) DGWS/AIAW track-and-field championships ever held.

=== Basketball ===
The TWU basketball team reached the championship game at the 2024 NCAA Division II women's basketball tournament, where they lost to Minnesota State. They finished the season with a program-record 34 wins.

=== Volleyball ===
In 1973, TWU reached the national championship match of the AIAW women's volleyball tournament, only to fall to Long Beach State.

== Gallery ==
=== Teams ===
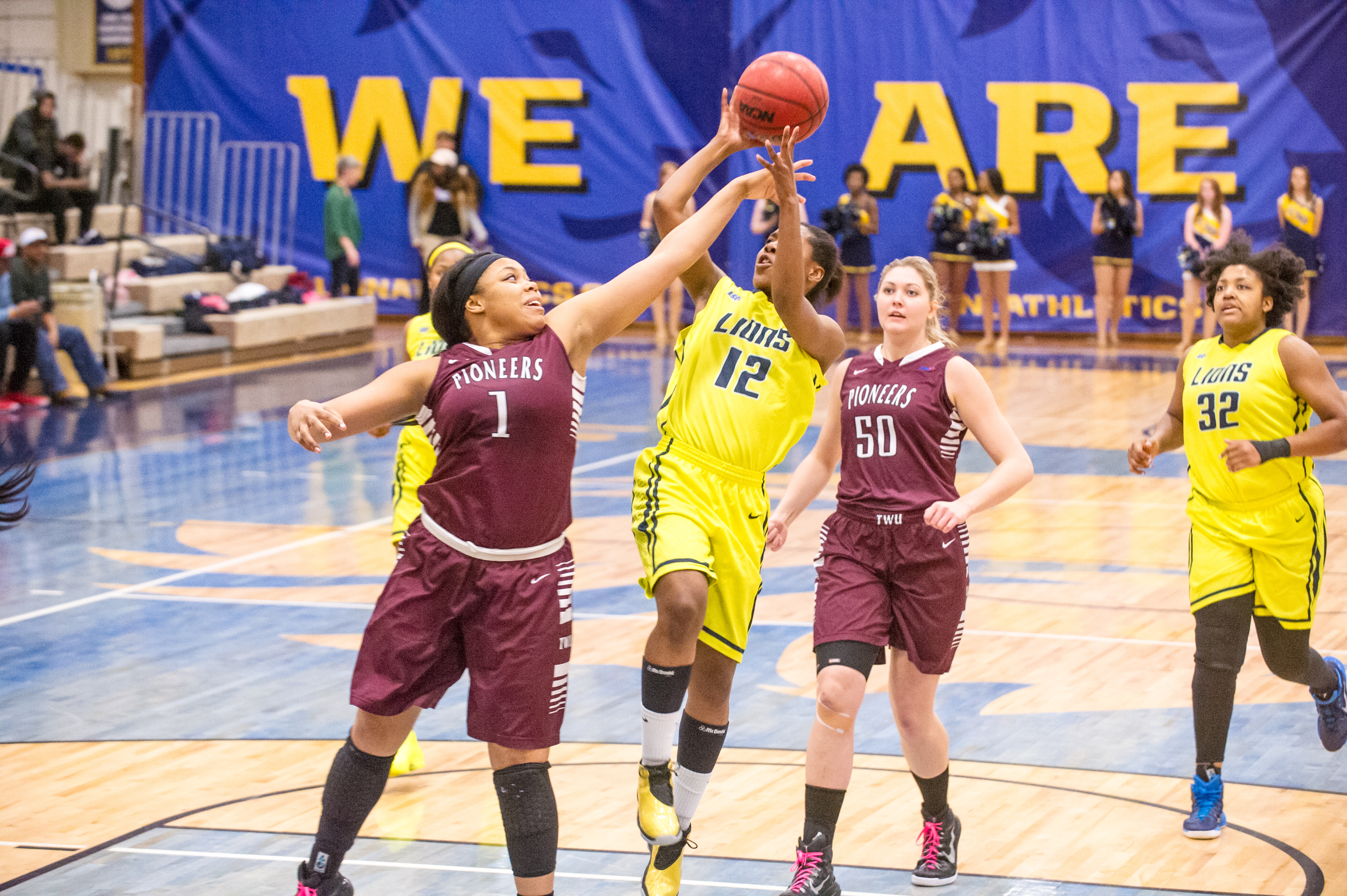
The Pioneers basketball team in action against the Texas A&M–Commerce Lions in 2015

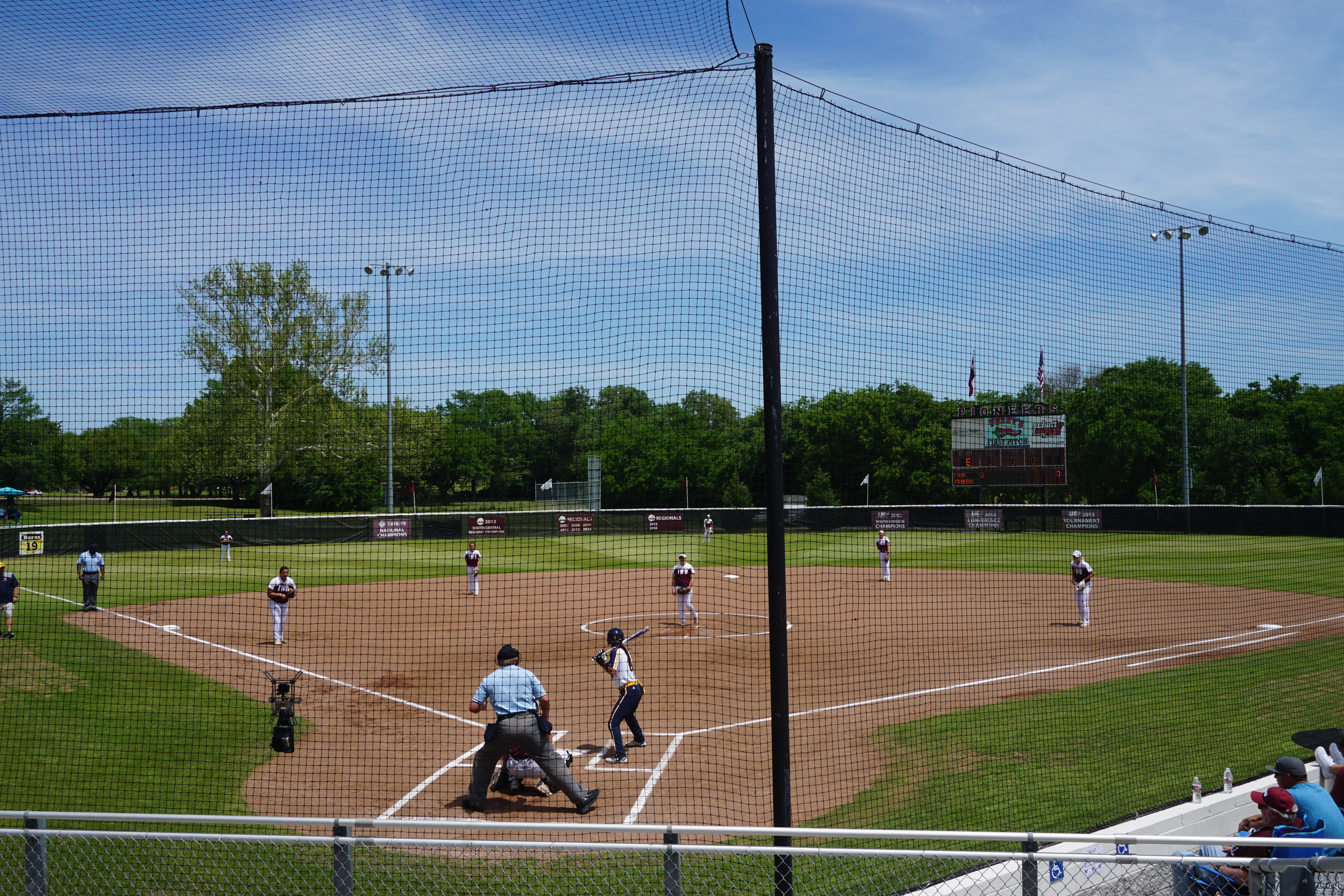
The Pioneers softball team in action against the Texas A&M–Commerce Lions in 2018

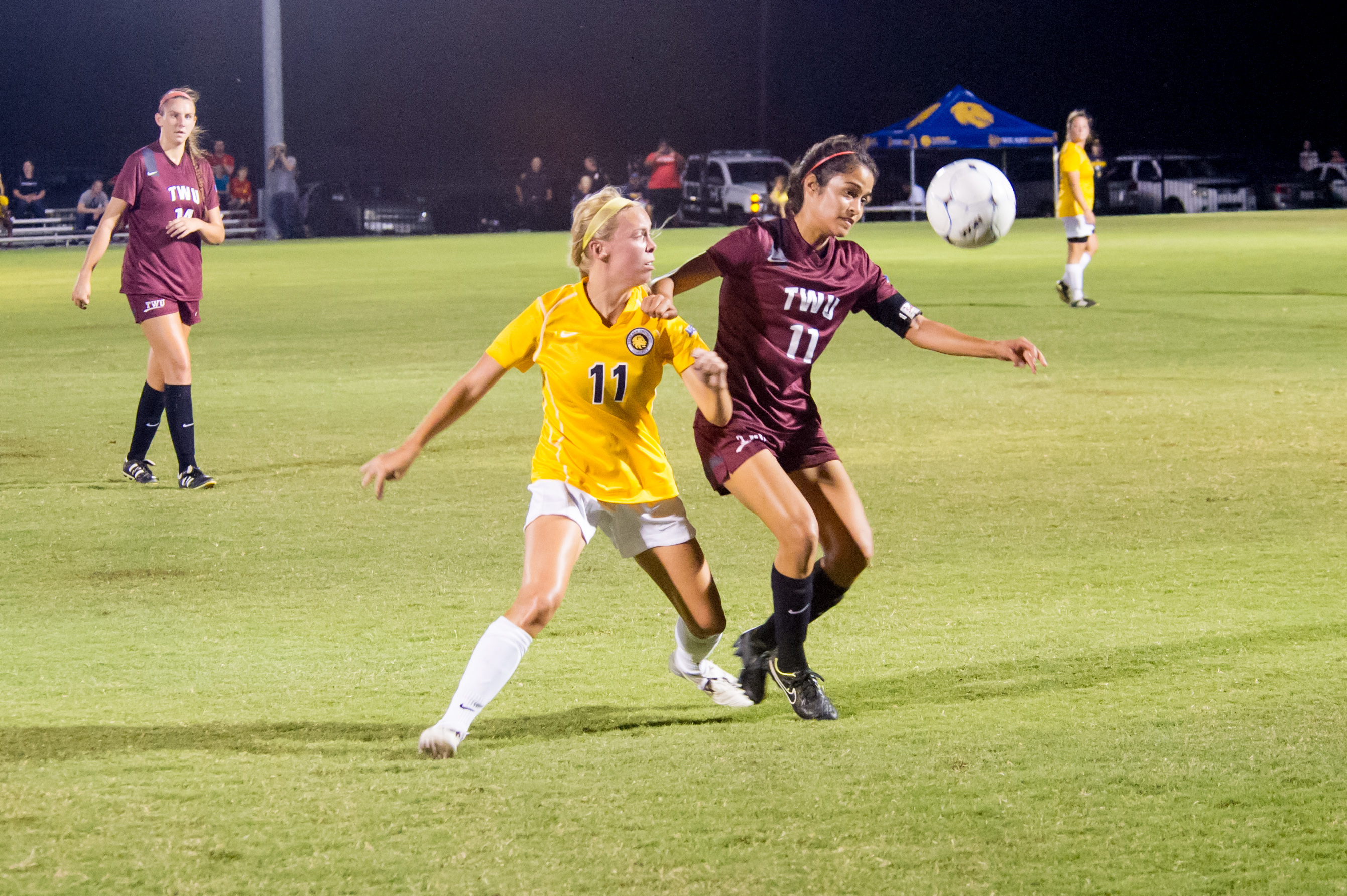
The Pioneers soccer team in action against the Texas A&M–Commerce Lions in 2014

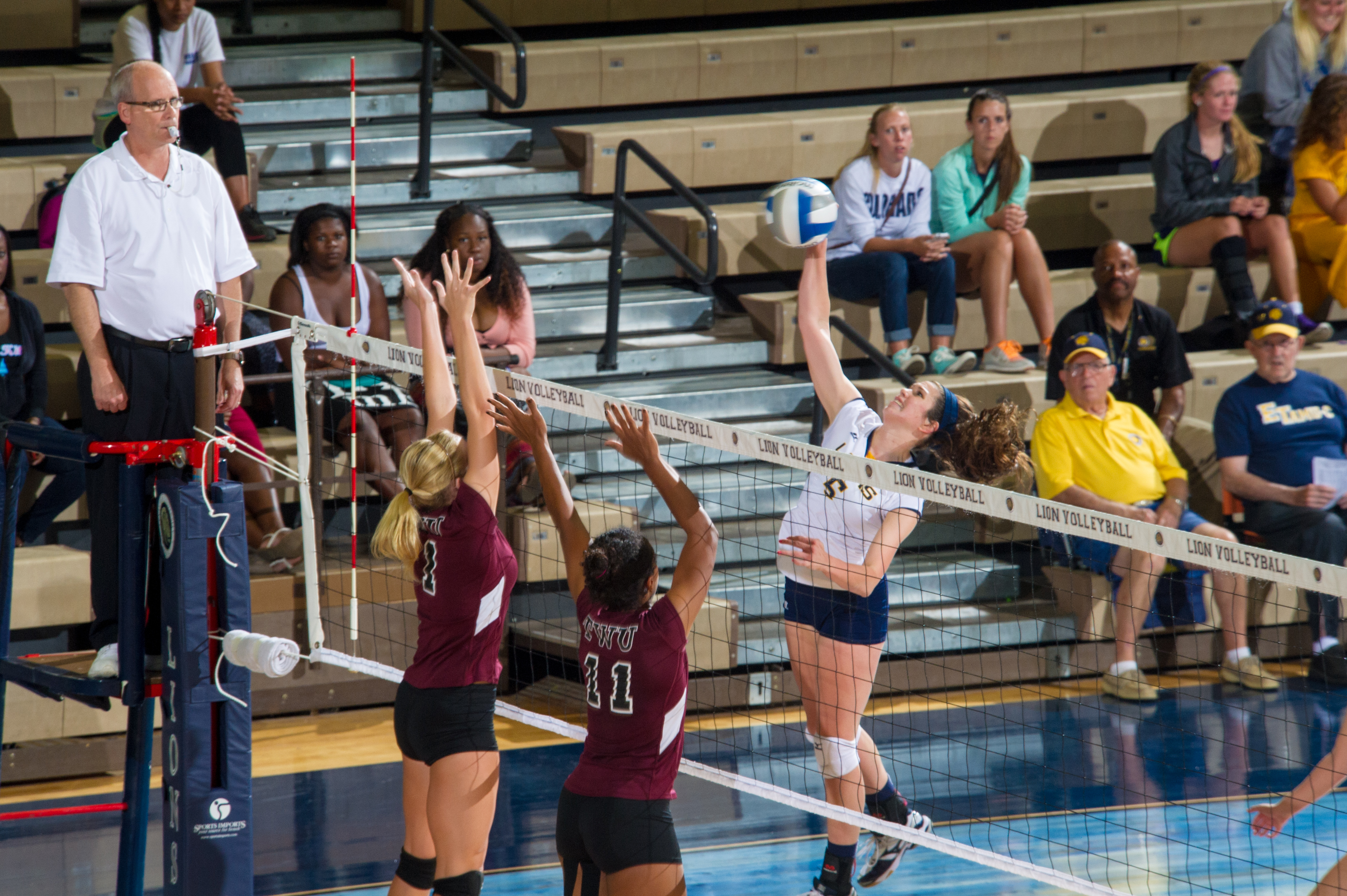
The Pioneers volleyball team in action against the Texas A&M–Commerce Lions in 2014

=== Venues ===
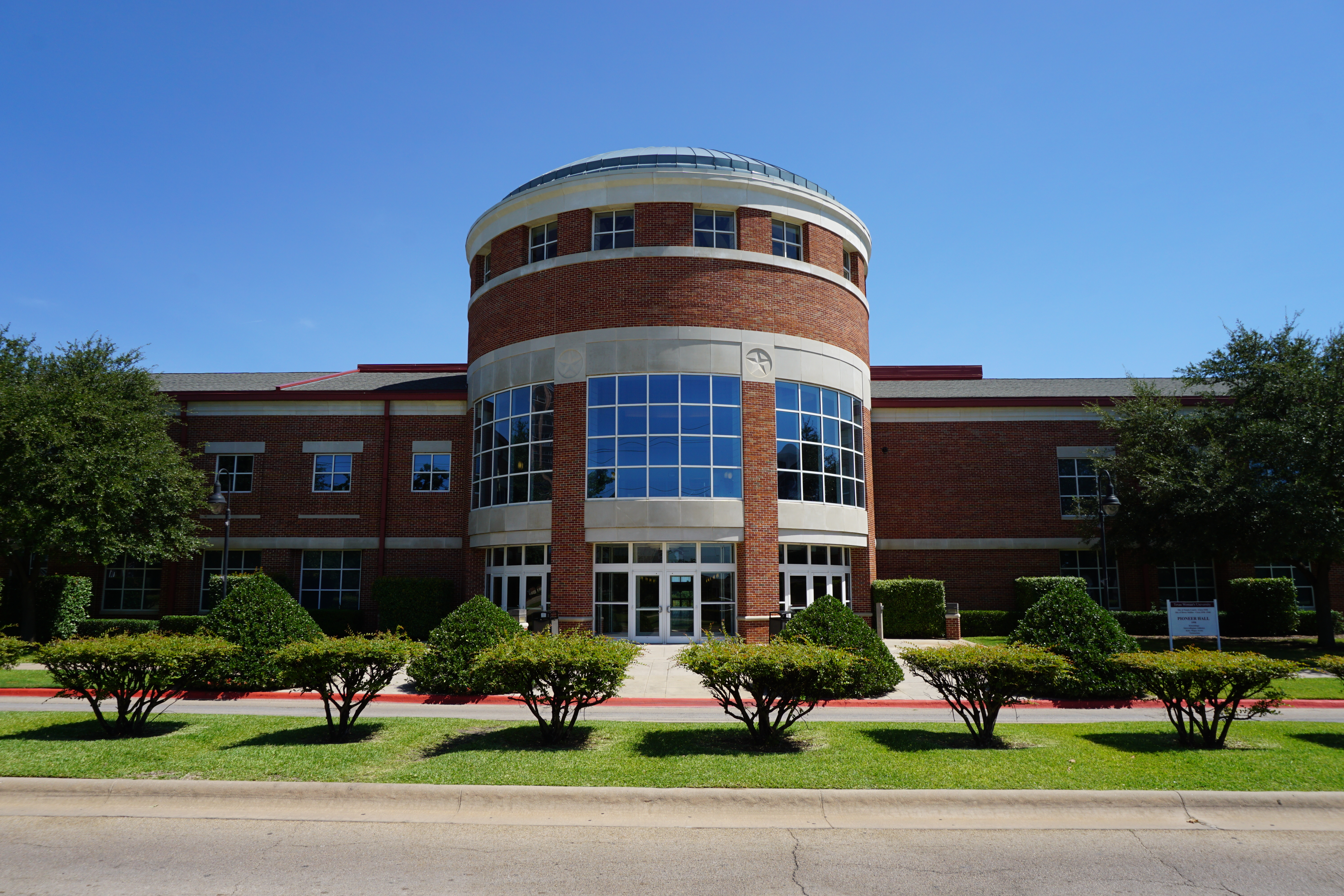
Pioneer Hall (basketball, volleyball, and gymnastics)

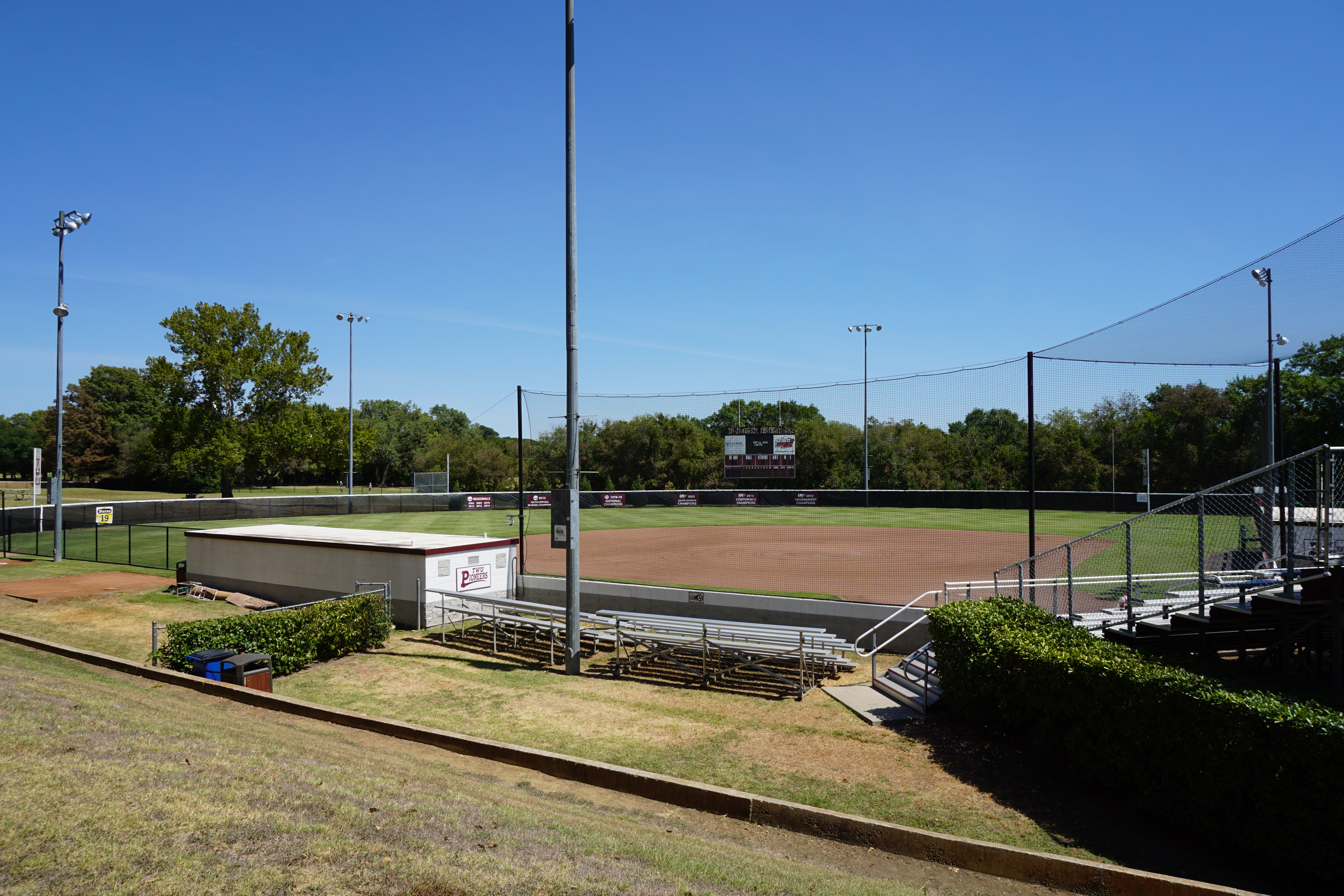
Pioneer Field (softball)

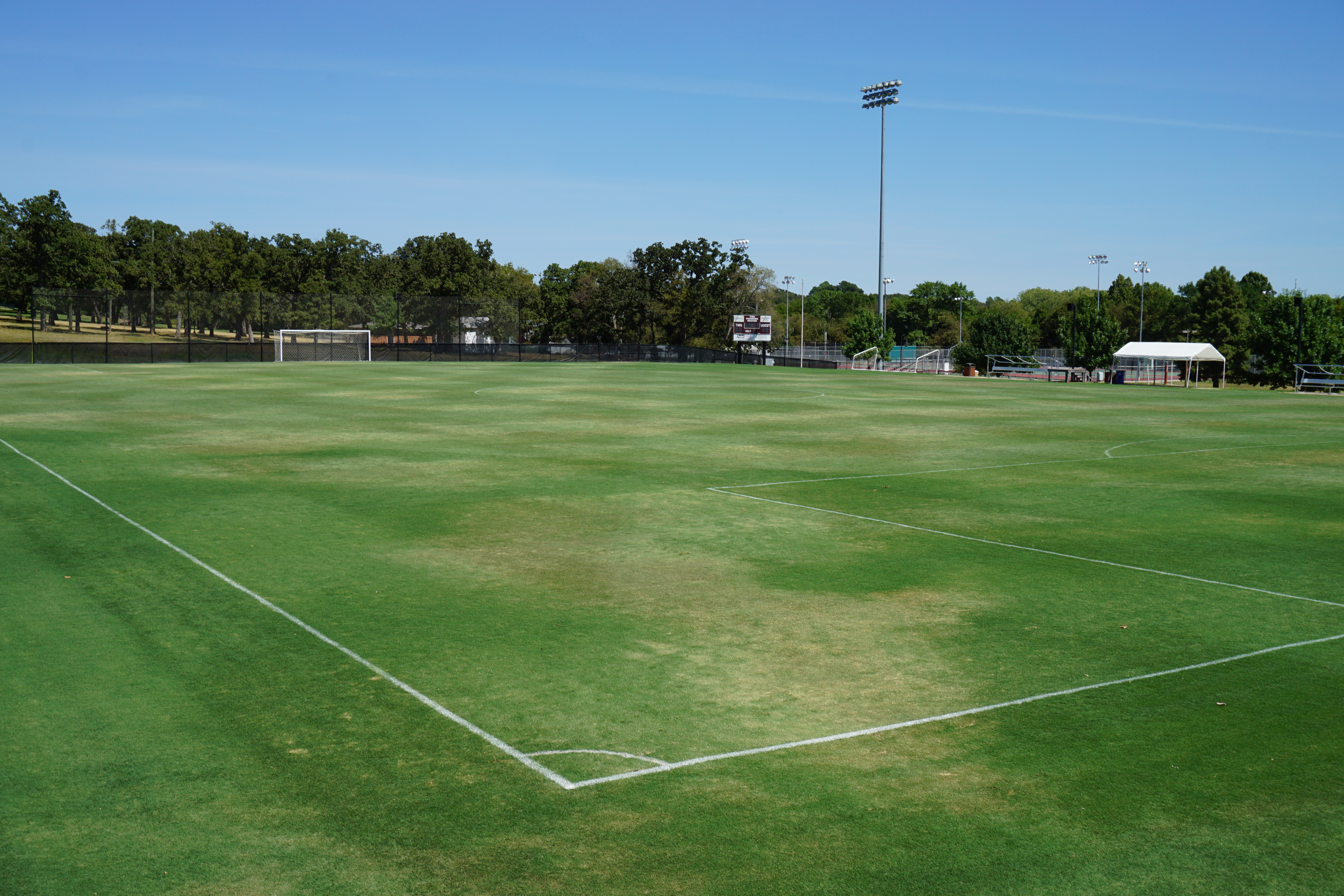
TWU Soccer Field
