= Buster Quist =

American javelin thrower

Medal record

Men's athletics

Representing the United States

Pan American Games
Gold medal – first place	1959 Chicago	Javelin throw

Herbert Larry "Buster" Quist (born April 1, 1936) is an American former track and field athlete who specialized in the javelin throw. His greatest achievement was a gold medal for the United States at the 1959 Pan American Games held in Chicago, where he set a games record of 70.50 m (231 ft 3 1/2 in) to succeed Bud Held. Despite this, he never won a national title, with his best national placing being second to Al Cantello at the 1959 USA Outdoor Track and Field Championships. His personal record of 74.60 m (244 ft 9 in) (old javelin model) was set in Philadelphia on July 19, 1959.

Quist grew up in Albuquerque, New Mexico and attended Albuquerque High School. His skills at throwing baseballs long distances caught the attention of the school's track coach, Pete McDavid, who encouraged Quist to try out the javelin. He won a scholarship to attend the University of New Mexico and was part of the college's football and track teams, including an undefeated streak in the javelin for the New Mexico Lobos at Skyline Conference level. A failure to make the American Olympic teams of 1960 and 1964 led to him abandoning the sport. At the age of seventy, he took up masters track and field and managed to throw beyond 117 feet (36 meters).

At college he was a Rhodes Scholar candidate, runner-up at the NCAA Men's Division I Outdoor Track and Field Championships in 1958 and 1959 (to John Fromm then Bill Alley), and a Sullivan Award nominee. Following his retirement from the sport he worked in the insurance industry.

== See also ==
- List of Pan American Games medalists in athletics (men)
