= Luke Caldwell =

Scottish long-distance runner

Luke Caldwell (born 2 August 1991) is a Scottish long distance runner.

== Career ==
Caldwell competed at the 2014 Commonwealth Games achieving 13th place in the 5000m and 14th in the 10,000m. A year later, he achieved his personal best of 28:29.61 minutes for the 10,000m at the 2015 Payton Jordan Invitational in Palo Alto, California. However, he has not yet beaten his personal best in the 5000m of 13:29.94 which he achieved in the 2013 Payton Jordan Cardinal Invitational in Palo Alto, California.

== Personal life ==
In 2012, Caldwell obtained a physics degree from Oxford University and then went on to study and run at the University of New Mexico, Albuquerque. By 2015, he had moved to western London to work as a science teacher and concentrate on athletics.
