= Oklahoma State Cowgirls track and field =

Track and field program of the Oklahoma State University

- University: Oklahoma State University
- Head coach: Dave Smith (16th season)
- Conference: Big 12
- Location: Stillwater, Oklahoma, US
- Indoor track: OSU Track and Field Complex
- Outdoor track: OSU Track and Field Complex
- Nickname: Cowgirls
- Colors: Orange and black

NCAA Indoor Tournament Appearances
- 1984, 1985, 1986, 1987, 1988, 1989, 1990, 1997, 1998, 1999, 2002, 2010, 2011, 2012, 2013, 2014, 2015, 2016, 2017, 2018, 2019, 2021, 2022, 2023, 2024, 2026

NCAA Outdoor Tournament Appearances
- 1984, 1985, 1986, 1987, 1988, 1989, 1990, 1991, 1992, 1997, 2001, 2002, 2005, 2006, 2011, 2012, 2013, 2015, 2016, 2017, 2019, 2022, 2023, 2024, 2025, 2026

Conference Indoor Championships
- Big 12; 2023

The Oklahoma State Cowgirls track and field program represents the Oklahoma State University in the sport of track and field. The program competes in Division I of the National Collegiate Athletic Association (NCAA) and the Big 12. The Cowgirls host their home indoor and outdoor meets at the OSU Track and Field Complex, both located on the university's Stillwater, Oklahoma campus. The Oklahoma State track and field teams are currently led by head coach Dave Smith.

== History ==
=== Indoor history ===
The Oklahoma State women's indoor track and field team was organized in 1977, first competing in the Big Eight Conference. The Cowgirls would make their first NCAA Championship appearance in 1984, scoring a single point and claiming a 39th–place finish. Christine McMiken became the first Oklahoma State individual national champion in 1985, when she won the 3,000 meter title.

The team would claim two more individual national championships with Jackie Goodman in 1989 and Siri Alfheim in 2002, both in the 5,000 meters. However, the Cowgirls would struggle to be nationally competitive throughout the 1990s and 2000s, scoring just two top–5 conference finishes and only finishing as high nationally as 13th at the 1989 NCAA Championship, until Dave Smith was hired to lead the track and field program in 2009.

Immediately after Smith's hiring, Oklahoma State would break an eight year NCAA Championship drought, qualifying for nationals in 2010 and beginning a streak of ten straight appearances in the NCAA Championship, which included the program's first national top–10 finish in 2016. In 2023, the Cowgirls would break through to win the first conference title in program history, edging out Texas 146–136.5 to win the Big 12 championship. A year later, Oklahoma State would score their best national finish in program history, scoring 27 points and finishing 8th at the 2024 NCAA Championship.

=== Outdoor history ===
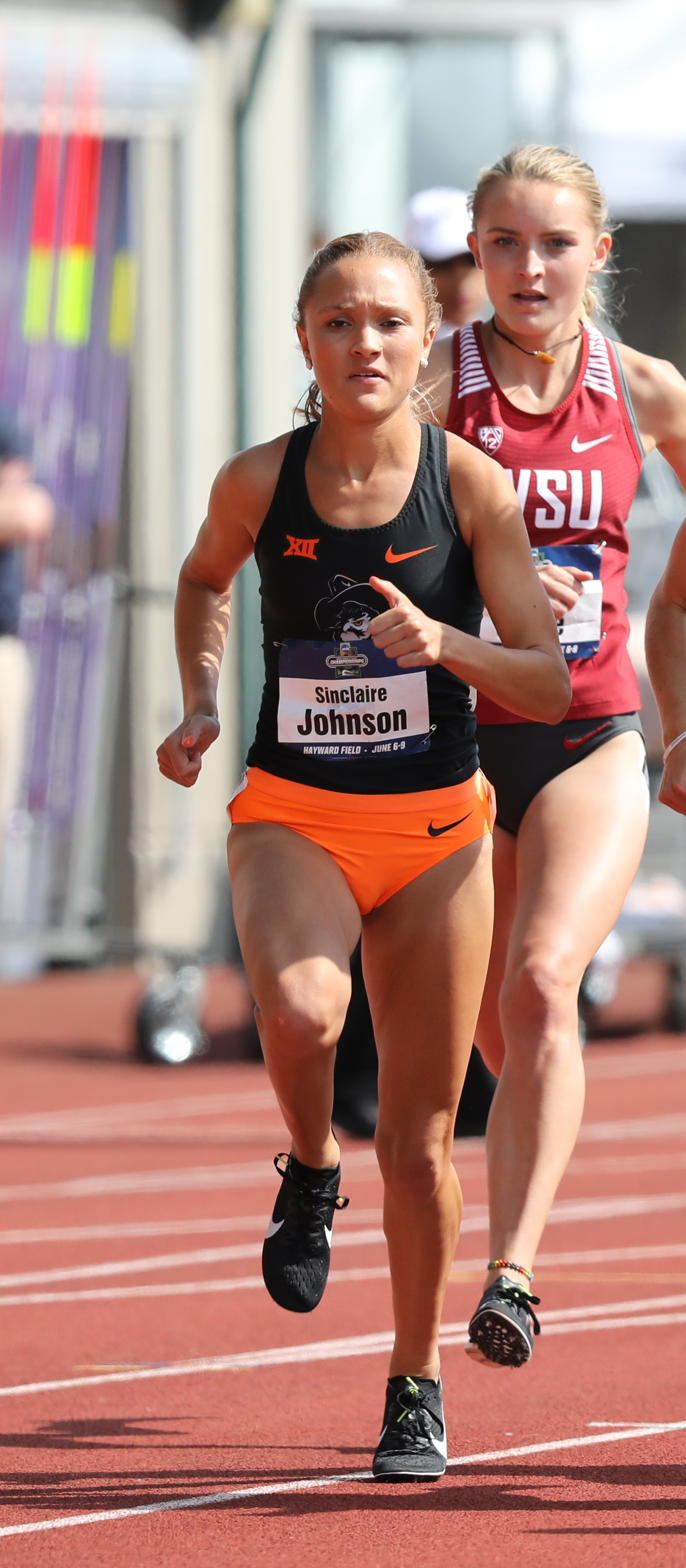
2019 NCAA Individual Champion Sinclaire Johnson

The Oklahoma State women's outdoor track and field team was organized in 1974, first competing in the Big Eight conference. The Cowgirls would make their first NCAA Championship appearance in 1984, where they would score eight points and finish 45th. Oklahoma State would win their first individual national championship in 1989 with Jackie Goodman in the 10,000 meters.

Since moving to the Big 12, Oklahoma State has won two more individual national championships with Natalja Piliusina in 2013 and Sinclaire Johnson in 2019, both in the 1,500 meters. Additionally, the Cowgirls most successful season came in 2016, when Oklahoma State scored 24 points and earned a 12th–place finish at the NCAA Championship, the best finish in program history.

== NCAA Championship results ==
Indoor Championship Results

Year	Points	Place
1984	1	39th
1985	10	17th
1986	4	25th
1987	4	21st
1988	2	29th
1989	10	13th
1990	6	25th
1997	7	25th
1998	5	38th
1999	5	38th
2002	10	22nd
2010	5	40th
2011	5	40th
2012	8	28th
2013	4	40th
2014	14	15th
2015	8	28th
2016	18	10th
2017	5	39th
2018	3	45th
2019	6	35th
2021	9	24th
2022	10	18th
2023	9	21st
2024	27	8th
2026	7	32nd

Outdoor Championship Results

Year	Points	Place
1984	8	45th
1985	16	16th
1986	16	16th
1987	4	44th
1988	11	22nd
1989	16	14th
1990	1	63rd
1991	4	46th
1992	8	25th
1997	5	38th
2001	5	40th
2002	8	29th
2005	6	44th
2006	6	37th
2011	8	34th
2012	4	50th
2013	10	25th
2015	6	35th
2016	24	12th
2017	4	48th
2019	12	22nd
2022	15	15th
2023	12	22nd
2024	23	14th
2025	5	46th
2026	3	57th

== NCAA Individual Event Champions ==
=== Indoor ===
Year	Event	Athlete(s)
1985	3,000 meters	Christine McMiken
1989	5,000 meters	Jackie Goodman
2002	5,000 meters	Siri Alfheim
2016	Mile	Kaela Edwards
2022	3,000 meters	Taylor Roe

=== Outdoor ===
Year	Event	Athlete(s)
1989	10,000 meters	Jackie Goodman
2013	1,500 meters	Natalja Piliusina
2019	1,500 meters	Sinclaire Johnson

== OSU Track and Field Complex ==
Built in 2013 at a cost of about $9 million, the complex features a nine-lane 400-meter track with a steeplechase turnout along with infield and adjacent areas for field events, including shot put, discus, hammer throw, pole vault, high jump and long jump.

== See also ==
- Oklahoma State Cowboys and Cowgirls
- Oklahoma State Cowgirls cross country
