= 2012 NCAA Division I Outdoor Track and Field Championships =

- Edition: 91st (Men); 31st (Women)
- Dates: June 5–8, 2012
- Host city: (Iowa) Des Moines, Iowa; Drake University
- Venue: Drake Stadium
- Events: 36

The 2012 NCAA Division I Outdoor Track and Field Championships were the 91st NCAA Division I Men's Outdoor Track and Field Championships and the 31st NCAA Division I Women's Outdoor Track and Field Championships at Drake Stadium in Des Moines, Iowa on the campus of the Drake University from June 5–8, 2012.

In total, thirty-six different men's and women's track and field events were contested.

== Results ==
=== Men's events ===
- Final results shown, not prelims

==== 100 meters ====
Wind: -2.3 m/s

Rank	Name	University	Time	Notes
1st place, gold medalist(s)	Andrew Riley Jamaica	Illinois	10.28	10.272
2nd place, silver medalist(s)	Harry Adams	Auburn	10.28	10.274
3rd place, bronze medalist(s)	Maurice Mitchell	Florida State	10.28	10.277
4	Darrell Wesh	Virginia Tech	10.30	10.291
5	Marcus Rowland	Auburn	10.30	10.298
6	Kemar Hyman Cayman Islands	Florida State	10.34	
7	Charles Silmon	TCU	10.39	
8	Aaron Ernest	LSU	10.45	

==== 200 meters ====
Wind: -4.2 m/s

Rank	Name	University	Time	Notes
1st place, gold medalist(s)	Maurice Mitchell	Florida State	20.40	
2nd place, silver medalist(s)	Ameer Webb	Texas A&M	20.65	
3rd place, bronze medalist(s)	Horatio Williams	Florida State	20.78	
4	Isiah Young	Mississippi	20.89	
5	Aaron Ernest	LSU	21.00	
6	Keenan Brock	Auburn	21.02	
7	Aaron Brown Canada	USC	21.13	
8	Harry Adams	Auburn	26.51	

==== 400 meters ====
Rank	Name	University	Time	Notes
1st place, gold medalist(s)	Tony McQuay	Florida	44.58	
2nd place, silver medalist(s)	Michael Berry	Oregon	44.75	
3rd place, bronze medalist(s)	Gil Roberts	Florida	44.99	
4	David Verburg	GMU	45.22	
5	Joshua Mance	University of Southern California	45.37	
6	Brady Gehret	Penn State	45.44	
7	Akheem Gauntlett Jamaica	Arkansas	45.56	
8	Deon Lendore Trinidad and Tobago	Texas A&M	45.63	

==== 800 meters ====
Rank	Name	University	Time	Notes
1st place, gold medalist(s)	Charles Jock	UC Irvine	1:45.59	
2nd place, silver medalist(s)	Erik Sowinski	Iowa	1:45.90	
3rd place, bronze medalist(s)	Elijah Greer	Oregon	1:46.05	
4	Ryan Martin	UC Santa Barbara	1:46.20	
5	Edward Kemboi Kenya	Iowa State	1:46.20	
6	Ricky West	Missouri	1:46.47	
7	Aaron Evans	Georgia	1:46.66	
8	Samuel Ellison	Villanova	1:47.62	

==== 1500 meters ====
Rank	Name	University	Time	Notes
1st place, gold medalist(s)	Andrew Bayer	Indiana	3:43.82	
2nd place, silver medalist(s)	Miles Batty	BYU	3:43.83	
3rd place, bronze medalist(s)	Ryan Hill	NC State	3:44.24	
4	Michael Hammond	Virginia Tech	3:44.47	
5	Rob Finnerty	Wisconsin	3:44.53	
6	Rich Peters	Boston University	3:44.66	
7	Duncan Phillips	Arkansas	3:44.77	
8	Erik van Ingen	Binghamton	3:45.00	

==== 5000 meters ====
Rank	Name	University	Time	Notes
1st place, gold medalist(s)	Cameron Levins Canada	Southern Utah	13:40.05	
2nd place, silver medalist(s)	Paul Chelimo	UNC Greensboro	13:41.04	
3rd place, bronze medalist(s)	Lawi Lalang Kenya	Arizona	13:42.20	
4	Hassan Mead	Minnesota	13:42.53	
5	Stephen Sambu Kenya	Arizona	13:43.76	
6	Trevor Dunbar	Oregon	13:44.16	
7	Mohammed Ahmed Canada	Wisconsin	13:50.32	
8	Girma Mecheso	Oklahoma State	13:57.08	

==== 10,000 meters ====
Rank	Name	University	Time	Notes
1st place, gold medalist(s)	Cameron Levins Canada	Southern Utah	28:07.14	
2nd place, silver medalist(s)	Stephen Sambu Kenya	Arizona	28:09.52	
3rd place, bronze medalist(s)	Chris Derrick	Stanford	28:17.28	
4	Luke Puskedra	Oregon	28:24.24	
5	Jared Ward	BYU	28:59.74	
6	Elliot Krause	Wisconsin	29:02.89	
7	Ryan Dohner	Texas	29:05.11	
8	Soufiane Bouchikhi Belgium	Eastern Kentucky	29:09.08	

==== 110-meter hurdles ====
Wind: -3.5 m/s

Rank	Name	Country	University	Time	Notes
1st place, gold medalist(s)	Andrew Riley	Jamaica	Illinois	13.53	
2nd place, silver medalist(s)	Ameer Webb	United States	Texas A&M	13.60	
3rd place, bronze medalist(s)	Spencer Adams	United States	Clemson	13.73	
4	Barrett Nugent	United States	LSU	13.80	
5	Eddie Lovett	United States Virgin Islands	Florida	13.82	
6	Jarret Eaton	United States	Syracuse	13.83	
7	Shane Brathwaite	Barbados	Texas Tech	13.93	
8	Keiron Stewart	Jamaica	Texas	14.08	

==== 400-meter hurdles ====
Rank	Name	Country	University	Time	Notes
1st place, gold medalist(s)	Amaechi Morton	Nigeria	Stanford	48.79	
2nd place, silver medalist(s)	Jamele Mason	Puerto Rico	Texas Tech	48.89	
3rd place, bronze medalist(s)	Reggie Wyatt	United States	USC	49.11	
4	Keyunta Hayes	United States	UTSA	49.38	
5	David Aristil	United States	South Florida	49.54	
6	Michael Stigler	United States	Kansas	50.41	
7	Antonio Blanks	United States	Ohio State	50.49	
8	Chris Carter	United States	BYU	51.77	

==== 3000 meter steeplechase ====
Rank	Name	University	Time	Notes
1st place, gold medalist(s)	Donn Cabral	Princeton	8:35.44	
2nd place, silver medalist(s)	Craig Forys	Michigan	8:40.66	
3rd place, bronze medalist(s)	Cory Leslie	Ohio State	8:40.98	
4	Henry Lelei Kenya	Texas A&M	8:42.07	
5	Travis Mahoney	Temple	8:43.29	
6	Anthony Rotich Kenya	UTEP	8:46.01	
7	De'Sean Turner	Indiana	8:46.04	
8	Carl Stones	Tulsa	8:46.67	

=== Women's events ===
- Final results shown, not prelims

==== 100 meters ====
Wind: -1.7 m/s

Rank	Name	University	Time	Notes
1st place, gold medalist(s)	English Gardner	Oregon	11.10	
2nd place, silver medalist(s)	Kimberlyn Duncan	LSU	11.16	
3rd place, bronze medalist(s)	Kai Selvon Trinidad and Tobago	Auburn	11.41	11.4103
4	Octavious Freeman	UCF	11.41	11.4106
5	Alexis Love	Murray State	11.53	
6	Chelsea Hayes	Louisiana Tech	11.58	
7	Aurieyall Scott	UCF	11.59	

Semoy Hackett of Louisiana State University was initially awarded the Bronze but was subsequently disqualified for testing positive for methylhexaneamine. LSU was forced to vacate their national championship as a result and Hackett was given a doping ban of two-year and four months. The ban ended 30 April 2015.

==== 200 meters ====
Wind: -2.3 m/s

Rank	Name	University	Time	Notes
1st place, gold medalist(s)	Kimberlyn Duncan	LSU	22.86	
2nd place, silver medalist(s)	Kai Selvon Trinidad and Tobago	Auburn	23.19	
3rd place, bronze medalist(s)	Dominique Duncan	Texas A&M	23.19	
4	Octavious Freeman	UCF	23.25	
5	Christy Udoh Nigeria	Texas	23.45	
6	Ashley Collier	Texas A&M	23.54	
7	Paris Daniels	Kansas	23.73	

Semoy Hackett of LSU initially placed 5th but was subsequently disqualified for a doping offence.

==== 400 meters ====
Rank	Name	University	Time	Notes
1st place, gold medalist(s)	Ashley Spencer	Illinois	50.95	
2nd place, silver medalist(s)	Rebecca Alexander	LSU	51.20	
3rd place, bronze medalist(s)	Diamond Dixon	Kansas	51.59	
4	Regina George	Arkansas	51.68	
5	Phyllis Francis	Oregon	51.79	
6	Marlena Wesh	Clemson	52.13	
7	Jody-Ann Muir	Mississippi State	52.63	
8	Lénora Guion-Firmin France	UMES	52.65	

==== 800 meters ====
Rank	Name	University	Time	Notes
1st place, gold medalist(s)	Nachelle Mackie	BYU	2:01.06	
2nd place, silver medalist(s)	Charlene Lipsey	LSU	2:01.40	
3rd place, bronze medalist(s)	Chanelle Price	Tennessee	2:01.49	
4	Laura Roesler	Oregon	2:02.96	
5	Anne Kesselring	Oregon	2:03.41	
6	Kathy Klump	Cincinnati	2:03.56	
7	Megan Malasarte	Georgia	2:03.57	
8	Caroline King	Boston College	2:05.77	

==== 1500 meters ====
Rank	Name	University	Time	Notes
1st place, gold medalist(s)	Katie Flood	Washington	4:13.79	
2nd place, silver medalist(s)	Emily Infeld	Georgetown	4:14.02	
3rd place, bronze medalist(s)	Jordan Hasay	Oregon	4:14.03	
4	Lucy van Dalen New Zealand	Stony Brook	4:14.40	
5	Greta Feldman	Princeton	4:14.76	
6	Cory McGee	Florida	4:14.95	
7	Amanda Winslow	Florida State	4:14.96	
8	Violah Lagat Kenya	Florida State	4:16.77	

==== 5000 meters ====
Rank	Name	University	Time	Notes
1st place, gold medalist(s)	Abby D'Agostino	Dartmouth	16:11.34	
2nd place, silver medalist(s)	Megan Goethals	Washington	16:11.37	
3rd place, bronze medalist(s)	Jessica Tebo	Colorado	16:14.32	
4	Emily Sisson	Providence	16:18.24	
5	Aliphine Tuliamuk	Wichita State	16:18.61	
6	Natosha Rogers	Texas A&M	16:20.04	
7	Kathy Kroeger	Stanford	16:22.60	
8	Alex Kosinski	Oregon	16:24.42	

==== 10,000 meters ====
Rank	Name	University	Time	Notes
1st place, gold medalist(s)	Natosha Rogers	Texas A&M	32:41.63	
2nd place, silver medalist(s)	Aliphine Tuliamuk	Wichita State	32:45.43	
3rd place, bronze medalist(s)	Deborah Maier	California	32:47.20	
4	Meaghan Nelson	Iowa State	32:47.43	
5	Allison Woodward	Oregon	32:56.94	
6	Sarah Waldron	New Mexico	32:58.84	
7	Elvin Kibet Kenya	Arizona	33:02.04	
8	Becky Wade	Rice University	33:13.57	

==== 100-meter hurdles ====
Wind: -3.1 m/s

Rank	Name	Country	University	Time	Notes
1st place, gold medalist(s)	Christina Manning	United States	Ohio State	12.89	
2nd place, silver medalist(s)	Brianna Rollins	United States	Clemson	12.91	
3rd place, bronze medalist(s)	Bridgette Owens	United States	Clemson	13.10	
4	Jacquelyn Coward	United States	UCF	13.16	
5	Jasmin Stowers	United States	LSU	13.20	
6	Donique' Flemings	United States	Texas A&M	13.24	
7	Chelsea Carrier-Eades	United States	West Virginia	13.31	
8	Katie Nelms	United States	Stanford	13.97	

==== 400-meter hurdles ====
Rank	Name	Country	University	Time	Notes
1st place, gold medalist(s)	Cassandra Tate	United States	LSU	55.22	
2nd place, silver medalist(s)	Turquoise Thompson	United States	UCLA	55.28	
3rd place, bronze medalist(s)	Ellen Wortham	United States	Tennessee	55.82	
4	Thandi Stewart	United States	Miami	56.53	
5	Dalilah Muhammad	United States	USC	56.71	
6	Danielle Dowie	Jamaica	Texas	56.85	
7	Kianna Elahi	United States	Iowa State	56.93	
8	London Finley	United States	Georgetown	58.74	

==== 3000 meter steeplechase ====
Rank	Name	University	Time	Notes
1st place, gold medalist(s)	Shalaya Kipp	Colorado	9:49.02	
2nd place, silver medalist(s)	Genevieve LaCaze Australia	University of Florida	9:50.25	
3rd place, bronze medalist(s)	Alexi Pappas	Dartmouth	10:01.20	
4	Astrid Leutert Switzerland	Florida State	10:02.07	
5	Colleen Quigley	Florida State	10:05.61	
6	Melanie Thompson	Oregon	10:07.18	
7	Alyssa Kulik	Clemson	10:07.54	
8	Rebeka Stowe	Kansas	10:12.16	

== See also ==
- NCAA Division I Men's Outdoor Track and Field Championships
- NCAA Division I Women's Outdoor Track and Field Championships
