= 2013 NCAA Division I Outdoor Track and Field Championships =

- Edition: 92nd (Men); 32nd (Women)
- Dates: June 5–8, 2013
- Host city: Eugene, Oregon; University of Oregon
- Venue: Hayward Field
- Events: 36

The 2013 NCAA Division I Outdoor Track and Field Championships were the 92nd NCAA Division I Men's Outdoor Track and Field Championships and the 32nd NCAA Division I Women's Outdoor Track and Field Championships at Hayward Field in Eugene, Oregon on the campus of the University of Oregon from June 5–8, 2013. In total, thirty-six different men's and women's track and field events were contested.

On the men's side, the team national championship was shared between the Texas A&M Aggies, their fourth title, and the Florida Gators, their second consecutive title. On the women's side, the team national championship was won by the Kansas Jayhawks, their first title.

== Results ==
=== Men's events ===
==== 100 meters ====
- Final results shown, not prelims

Wind: +3.2 m/s

Rank	Name	University	Time	Notes
1st place, gold medalist(s)	Charles Silmon	TCU	9.89	
2nd place, silver medalist(s)	Dentarius Locke	Florida State	9.91	
3rd place, bronze medalist(s)	Isiah Young	Mississippi	9.96	
4	Diondre Batson	Alabama	10.01	10.006
5	Aaron Brown Canada	USC	10.01	10.008
6	Ameer Webb	Texas A&M	10.14	
7	Aaron Ernest	LSU	10.17	
8	Reggie Lewis	Clemson	10.24	

==== 200 meters ====
- Final results shown, not prelims

Wind: +2.6 m/s

Rank	Name	University	Time	Notes
1st place, gold medalist(s)	Ameer Webb	Texas A&M	20.10	
2nd place, silver medalist(s)	Isiah Young	Mississippi	20.17	
3rd place, bronze medalist(s)	Bryshon Nellum	USC	20.27	
4	Anaso Jobodwana South Africa	Jackson State	20.29	
5	Aaron Brown Canada	USC	20.33	
6	Justin Austin	Iowa	20.45	
7	Carvin Nkanata	Pittsburgh	20.47	
8	Charles Silmon	TCU	DNS	

==== 400 meters ====
- Final results shown, not prelims

Rank	Name	University	Time	Notes
1st place, gold medalist(s)	Bryshon Nellum	USC	44.73	
2nd place, silver medalist(s)	Deon Lendore Trinidad and Tobago	Texas A&M	44.94	
3rd place, bronze medalist(s)	Arman Hall	Florida	45.02	
4	David Verburg	GMU	45.03	
5	James Harris	Florida State	45.56	
6	Hugh Graham Jr	Florida	45.57	
7	Cass-Brown Stewart	Stephen F. Austin	45.98	
8	Akheem Gauntlett Jamaica	Arkansas	46.10	

==== 800 meters ====
- Final results shown, not prelims

Rank	Name	University	Time	Notes
1st place, gold medalist(s)	Elijah Greer	Oregon	1:46.58	
2nd place, silver medalist(s)	Casimir Loxsom	Penn State	1:46.88	
3rd place, bronze medalist(s)	Brannon Kidder	Penn State	1:47.51	
4	Harun Abda	Minnesota	1:47.60	
5	Leoman Momoh Nigeria	Arkansas	1:47.86	
6	Declan Murray	Loyola (Illinois)	1:48.02	
7	Eliud Rutto	Middle Tennessee	1:48.07	
8	Travis Burkstrand	Minnesota	1:48.24	

==== 1500 meters ====
- Only top eight final results shown; no prelims are listed

Rank	Name	University	Time	Notes
1st place, gold medalist(s)	Mac Fleet	Oregon	3:50.25	
2nd place, silver medalist(s)	Zach Perkins	Air Force	3:50.39	
3rd place, bronze medalist(s)	Patrick Casey	Oklahoma	3:50.60	
4	Austin Mudd	Wisconsin	3:50.84	
5	Jeremy Rae Canada	Notre Dame	3:51.07	
6	Robby Creese	Penn State	3:51.21	
7	Sam McEntee Australia	Villanova	3:51.35	
8	Andrew Bayer	Indiana	3:51.39	

==== 5000 meters ====
- Held on June 8, 2013. Only top eight final results shown

Rank	Name	University	Time	Notes
1st place, gold medalist(s)	Lawi Lalang Kenya	Arizona	13:35.19	
2nd place, silver medalist(s)	Paul Chelimo	UNC Greensboro	13:40.21	
3rd place, bronze medalist(s)	Diego Estrada	Northern Arizona	13:42.27	
4	Maverick Darling	Wisconsin	13:44.56	
5	Kemoy Campbell Jamaica	Arkansas	13:47.70	
6	Reed Connor	Wisconsin	13:50.70	
7	Luke Caldwell United Kingdom	New Mexico	13:55.55	
8	Henry Lelei Kenya	Texas A&M	13:58.55	

==== 10,000 meters ====
- Held on June 6, 2013. Only top eight final results shown

Rank	Name	University	Time	Notes
1st place, gold medalist(s)	Lawi Lalang Kenya	Arizona	29:29.65	
2nd place, silver medalist(s)	Paul Katam	UNC Greensboro	29:41.27	
3rd place, bronze medalist(s)	Craig Lutz	Texas	29:41.97	
4	Michael Fout	Florida State	29:42.23	
5	Michael Franklin	Princeton	29:42.34	
6	Parker Stinson	Oregon	29:46.45	
7	Girma Mecheso	Oklahoma State	29:47.87	
8	Jared Ward	BYU	29:51.59	

==== 3000 meter steeplechase ====
- Held on June 7, 2013. Only top eight final results shown

Rank	Name	University	Time	Notes
1st place, gold medalist(s)	Anthony Rotich Kenya	UTEP	8:21.19	
2nd place, silver medalist(s)	Henry Lelei	Texas A&M	8:23.16	
3rd place, bronze medalist(s)	Stanley Kebenei	Arkansas	8:24.45	
4	Curtis Carr	BYU	8:40.87	
5	Dakota Peachee	High Point	8:43.04	
6	Mattias Wolter Canada	Louisville	8:43.59	
7	Ole Hesselbjerg Denmark	Eastern Kentucky	8:43.80	
8	Aric Van Halen	Colorado	8:44.50	

=== Women's events ===
==== 100 meters ====
- Final results shown, not prelims

Wind: +0.9 m/s

Rank	Name	University	Time	Notes
1st place, gold medalist(s)	English Gardner	Oregon	10.96	
2nd place, silver medalist(s)	Octavious Freeman	UCF	11.00	
3rd place, bronze medalist(s)	Kimberlyn Duncan	LSU	11.08	
4	Aurieyall Scott	UCF	11.14	
5	Jennifer Madu	Texas A&M	11.31	
6	Cierra White	Texas Tech	11.32	
7	Jenna Prandini	Oregon	11.43	
8	Morolake Akinosun	Illinois	11.45	

==== 200 meters ====
- Final results shown, not prelims

Wind: +3.5 m/s

Rank	Name	University	Time	Notes
1st place, gold medalist(s)	Kimberlyn Duncan	LSU	22.04	
2nd place, silver medalist(s)	Kamaria Brown	Texas A&M	22.21	
3rd place, bronze medalist(s)	Aurieyall Scott	UCF	22.48	
4	Paris Daniels	Kansas	22.52	
5	Dezerea Bryant	Clemson	22.54	
6	Kai Selvon Trinidad and Tobago	Auburn	22.65	
7	Octavious Freeman	UCF	22.92	
8	Olivia Ekpone	Texas A&M	22.96	

==== 400 meters ====
- Final results shown, not prelims

Rank	Name	University	Time	Notes
1st place, gold medalist(s)	Ashley Spencer	Illinois	50.28	
2nd place, silver medalist(s)	Shaunae Miller Bahamas	Georgia	50.70	
3rd place, bronze medalist(s)	Phyllis Francis	Oregon	50.86	
4	Courtney Okolo	Texas	51.96	
5	Regina George	Arkansas	51.97	
6	Jody-Ann Muir	Mississippi State	52.56	
7	Lénora Guion-Firmin France	UMES	52.59	
8	Erika Rucker	Arkansas	53.20	

==== 800 meters ====
- Final results shown, not prelims

Rank	Name	University	Time	Notes
1st place, gold medalist(s)	Natoya Goule Jamaica	LSU	2:00.06	
2nd place, silver medalist(s)	Laura Roesler	Oregon	2:00.98	
3rd place, bronze medalist(s)	Justine Fedronic France	Stanford	2:01.67	
4	Charlene Lipsey	LSU	2:01.70	
5	Samantha Murphey	Illinois	2:02.10	
6	Amy Weissenbach	Stanford	2:02.29	
7	Cydney Ross	Duke	2:02.48	
8	Lauren Wallace	UC Davis	2:02.91	

==== 1500 meters ====
- Only top eight final results shown; no prelims are listed

Rank	Name	University	Time	Notes
1st place, gold medalist(s)	Natalja Piliusina Lithuania	Oklahoma State	4:13.25	
2nd place, silver medalist(s)	Cory McGee	Florida	4:13.94	
3rd place, bronze medalist(s)	Amanda Mergaert	Utah	4:14.30	
4	Rebecca Tracey	Notre Dame	4:14.42	
5	Amanda Eccleston	Michigan	4:14.56	
6	Stephanie Brown	Arkansas	4:14.58	
7	Shelby Houlihan	Arizona State	4:14.95	
8	Amanda Winslow	Florida State	4:16.00	

==== 5000 meters ====
- Held on June 8, 2013. Only top eight final results shown

Rank	Name	University	Time	Notes
1st place, gold medalist(s)	Abby D'Agostino	Dartmouth	15:43.26	
2nd place, silver medalist(s)	Betsy Saina Kenya	Iowa State	15:50.26	
3rd place, bronze medalist(s)	Jordan Hasay	Oregon	15:50.78	
4	Aliphine Tuliamuk-Bolton	Wichita State	15:51.92	
5	Megan Goethals	Washington	15:54.00	
6	Emily Sisson	Providence	15:58.40	
7	Emma Bates	Boise State	15:59.35	
8	Lauren Penney	Syracuse	16:01.09	

==== 10,000 meters ====
- Held on June 5, 2013. Only top eight final results shown

Rank	Name	University	Time	Notes
1st place, gold medalist(s)	Betsy Saina Kenya	Iowa State	33:08.85	
2nd place, silver medalist(s)	Aliphine Tuliamuk-Bolton	Wichita State	33:14.12	
3rd place, bronze medalist(s)	Emma Bates	Boise State	33:37.13	
4	Megan Goethals	Washington	33:40.85	
5	Katie Matthews	Boston University	33:43.26	
6	Jennifer Bergman	Arizona	33:45.03	
7	Katie Kellner	Cornell	33:45.31	
8	Risper Kimaiyo Kenya	UTEP	34:03.35	

==== 3000 meter steeplechase ====
- Held on June 8, 2013. Only top eight final results shown

Rank	Name	University	Time	Notes
1st place, gold medalist(s)	Emma Coburn	Colorado	9:35.38	
2nd place, silver medalist(s)	Colleen Quigley	Florida State	9:38.23	
3rd place, bronze medalist(s)	Amber Henry	Weber State	9:43.39	
4	Rachel Sorna	Cornell	9:52.86	
5	Leah O'Connor	Michigan State	9:53.71	
6	Courtney Frerichs	UMKC	9:55.02	
7	Grace Heymsfield	Arkansas	9:57.18	
8	Alexa Aragon	Notre Dame	9:57.26	

== See also ==
- NCAA Division I Men's Outdoor Track and Field Championships
- NCAA Division I Women's Outdoor Track and Field Championships
