= Isiah Young =

American track and field athlete (born 1990)

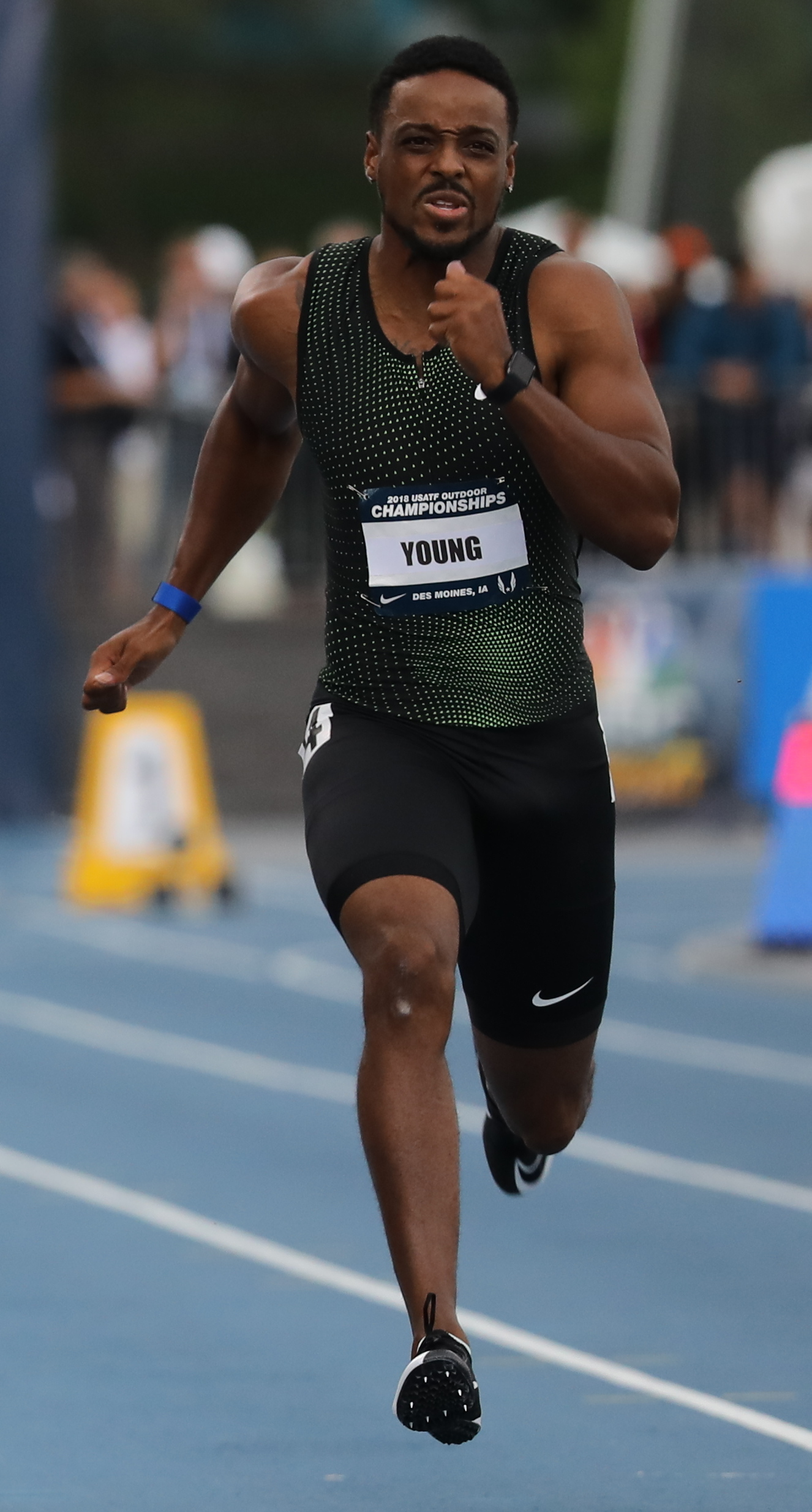
- Isiah Young at the 2018 USA Championships

Personal information
- Born: January 5, 1990 (age 36) Junction City, Kansas, U.S.

Sport
- Sport: Track and field
- Event: Sprints
- College team: Ole Miss Rebels
- Team: Nike
- Turned pro: 2013

Achievements and titles
- Personal bests: 100 m: 9.89 (2021); 200 m: 19.86 (Des Moines, 2013)
Medal record
Men's athletics
Representing the United States
World Relays
Silver medal – second place	2017 Nassau	4×200 m relay
Silver medal – second place	2019 Yokohama	4×100 m relay
NACAC Championships
Gold medal – first place	2022 Freeport	4×100 m relay

Isiah Young (born January 5, 1990) is an American track and field athlete who competes in the sprints. He was selected to compete for the United States at the 2012 Summer Olympics in the 200-meter dash.

== Career ==
Born in Junction City, Kansas, he attended Junction City High School then Allen Community College, competing athletically for both institutions. Young also did weightlifting during his high school years. At the 2009 USATF Junior Olympics he won a sprint double in the 100-meter dash and the 200-meter dash. He enrolled at the University of Mississippi in 2010 and took part in collegiate competition with the Ole Miss Rebels. He missed the 2011 outdoor season, but in 2012 he won the 200 m at the Southeastern Conference meet with a school record of 20.32 seconds. At the Drake Relays, he won the 100 m and placed second only to Wallace Spearmon over 200 m. After this he came fourth in the 200 m at the NCAA Outdoor Championship.

He was disappointed with finished out of the top three at the NCAA meet and changed his focus to the 2012 United States Olympic Trials. He finished in third place in the 200 m with a wind-assisted time of 20.16 seconds. Having finished on the podium behind Spearmon and Maurice Mitchell, he guaranteed his selection for the 2012 London Olympics. At London, he reached the semifinals.

On May 23, 2013, at the NCAA East Region Championships, Young joined the 10 second club running 100 meters in 9.99 with a +0.3 aiding wind.

At the 2013 USA Outdoor Track and Field Championships, Young qualified for the 2013 World Championships in Athletics by finishing second in the 200 meters. His time of 19.86 (+1.6 m/s wind) tied him with Donald Quarrie, Maurice Greene and Justin Gatlin for the 24th best performer of all time.

== Statistics ==
Information from IAAF profile or Track & Field Results Reporting System unless otherwise noted.

=== Personal bests ===
Event	Time	Wind	Competition	Venue	Date	Notes
100 m	9.89	+0.2	PURE Athletics Summer Invitational	Clermont, Florida, USA	May 30, 2021	
100 m	9.82 w	+3.0	Pure Athletics Sprint Elite Meet	Clermont, Florida, USA	May 16, 2015	Wind-assisted
200 m	19.86	+1.6	USA Championships	Des Moines, Iowa, USA	June 23, 2013	
200 m	19.75 w	+4.1	Pure Athletics Sprint Elite Meet	Clermont, Florida, USA	May 16, 2015	Wind-assisted
4×100 m relay	38.07	n/a	World Relays	Yokohama, Japan	May 12, 2019	
4×200 m relay	1:19.88	n/a	World Relays	Nassau, Bahamas	April 23, 2013	

=== Seasonal bests ===
Year	100 m	200 m
2009	10.44	21.50
2010	10.32	21.29
2011	10.31	20.81
2012	10.09	20.33
2013	9.99	19.86
2014	10.23	20.58
2015	10.00	19.93
2016	10.03	20.24
2017	9.97	20.14
2018	9.92	19.93
2019	9.99	20.29
2021	9.89	19.99

=== International championship results ===
Year	Competition	Venue	Position	Event	Time	Wind (m/s)	Notes
Representing the United States
2012	Olympic Games	London, England	8th (semi 2)	200 m	20.89	−0.6	
2013	World Championships	Moscow, Russia	3rd (semi 2)	200 m	20.36	0.0	
2014	World Relays	Nassau, Bahamas	1st (semi 2)	4×200 m relay	1:21.35	n/a	Q (Note: Did not run in the final.) PB
2015	World Relays	Nassau, Bahamas	DQ	4×200 m relay	—	n/a	Passing out of zone
2015	World Championships	Beijing, China	6th (qf 1)	200 m	20.51	−0.3	
2017	World Relays	Nassau, Bahamas	2nd	4×200 m relay	1:19.88	n/a	PB
2017	World Championships	London, England	8th	200 m	20.64	−0.1	
2019	World Relays	Yokohama, Japan	2nd	4×100 m relay	38.07	n/a	PB

=== National championship results ===
Year	Competition	Venue	Position	Event	Time	Wind (m/s)	Notes
Representing the Ole Miss Rebels
2012	NCAA Division I Indoor Championships	Nampa, Idaho	7th	60 m	6.63	n/a	
2012	NCAA Division I Championships	Des Moines, Iowa	9th	100 m	10.09	+1.4	PB
2012	NCAA Division I Championships	Des Moines, Iowa	4th	200 m	20.89	−4.2	
2012	USA Olympic Trials	Eugene, Oregon	23rd	100 m	10.41	+1.6	
2012	USA Olympic Trials	Eugene, Oregon	3rd	200 m	20.16 w	+2.3	Wind-assisted
2013	NCAA Division I Championships	Eugene, Oregon	3rd	100 m	9.93 w	+3.2	Wind-assisted
2013	NCAA Division I Championships	Eugene, Oregon	2nd	200 m	20.17 w	+2.6	Wind-assisted
Representing Nike
2013	USA Championships	Des Moines, Iowa	6th	100 m	10.12	+1.1	
2013	USA Championships	Des Moines, Iowa	1st	200 m	19.86	+1.6	PB (Note: Finished 2nd behind Tyson Gay, but Tyson Gay was disqualified after the race for doping.)
2014	USA Championships	Sacramento, California	18th	100 m	10.43	−0.9	
2014	USA Championships	Sacramento, California	10th	200 m	20.55 w	+2.1	Wind-assisted
2015	USA Championships	Eugene, Oregon	4th	100 m	10.00	0.0	SB
2015	USA Championships	Eugene, Oregon	2nd	200 m	19.93	+0.4	SB
2016	USA Olympic Trials	Eugene, Oregon	6th (semi 2)	100 m	10.21	+2.0	
2016	USA Olympic Trials	Eugene, Oregon	3rd (semi 1)	200 m	20.59	−1.1	
2017	USA Championships	Sacramento, California	8th	100 m	10.25	−0.7	
2017	USA Championships	Sacramento, California	5th	200 m	20.42	−2.3	
2018	USA Championships	Des Moines, Iowa	4th	100 m	10.00	+1.1	
2019	USA Championships	Des Moines, Iowa	6th	100 m	10.21	−1.0	
