= Emily Infeld =

American long-distance runner (born 1990)

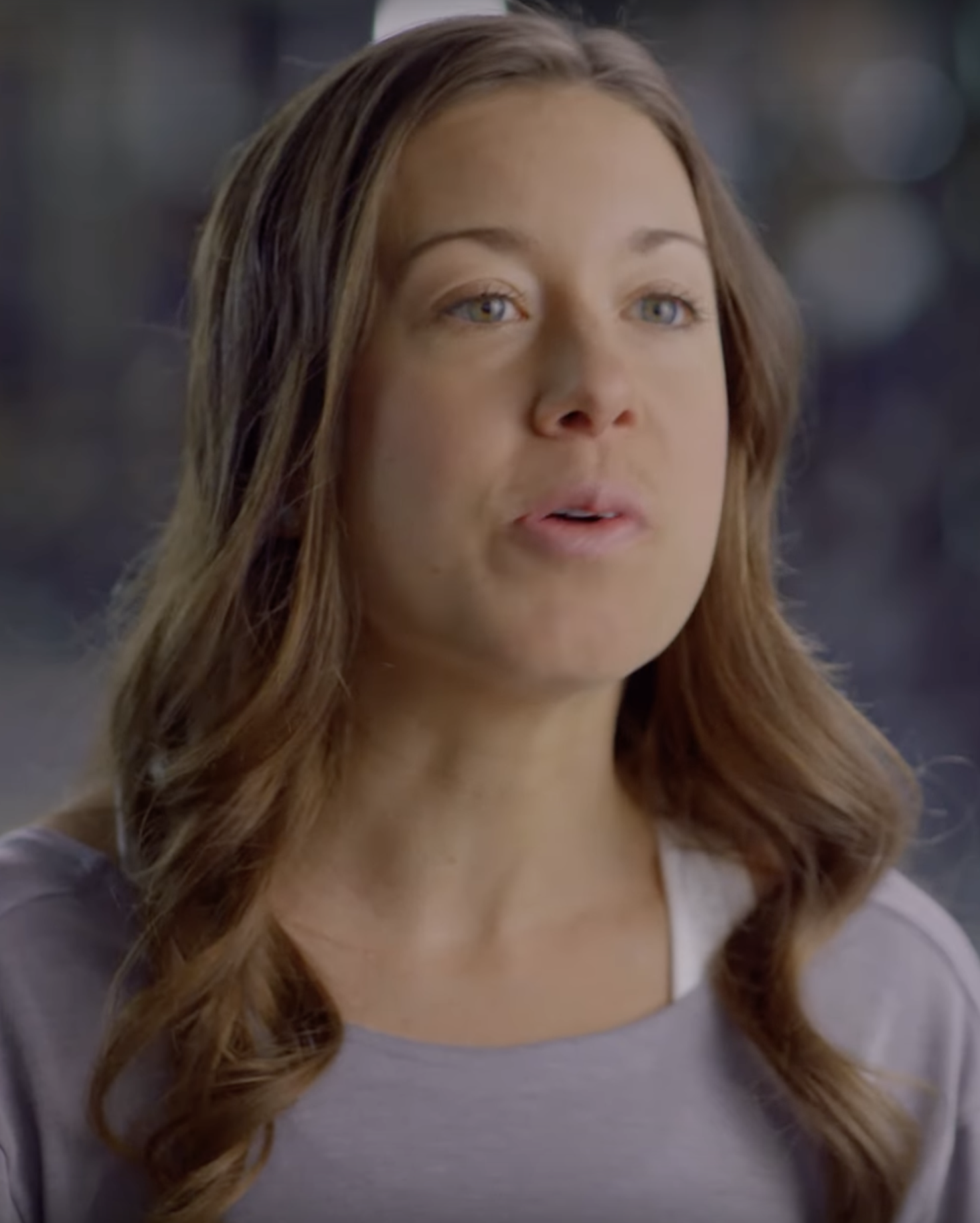
- Infeld in 2022

Personal information
- Born: March 21, 1990 (age 36) Ohio, United States
- Agent: Ray Flynn
- Height: 5 ft 4 in (163 cm)
- Weight: 124 lb (56 kg)

Sport
- Events: 5,000 meters, 10,000 meters
- College team: Georgetown
- Club: Team Boss (2022-2024) Bowerman Track Club (-2022)
- Team: Brooks Sports (2025-) Nike (-2025) (2026-)
- Turned pro: 2012
- Coached by: Chris Miltenberg

Achievements and titles
- Olympic finals: 2016 10,000 m, 11th
- World finals: 2015 10,000 m, 3rd 2017 10,000 m, 6th
- Personal bests: 800 meters: 2:06.05; 1500 meters: 4:07.77; 3000 meters: 8:41.43; 5000 meters: 14:50.90; 10,000 meters: 30:59.38
Medal record
Women's athletics
Representing the United States
World Championships
Bronze medal – third place	2015 Beijing	10,000 m

Emily Infeld (born March 21, 1990) is an American long-distance runner. She regularly competes in the 5000 m and 10,000 m distances during her professional career; in her college career she regularly competed in the 4 × 800 meter relay and 1500 m on up to 5000 m.

During her collegiate career at Georgetown University, she was the 3000 m 2012 NCAA Indoor Championships winner. She also had runner-up placings in NCAA competition in cross country running and outdoor track (1500 m and 5000 m).

During her professional career, Infeld has represented her country at major international championships including the 2013 IAAF World Cross Country Championships (21st overall aiding the US team to 4th), the 2015 World Championships in Athletics (3rd), the 2016 Summer Olympics (11th), and the 2017 World Championships in Athletics (6th).

== Running career ==
=== Early career ===
Raised in University Heights, Ohio, Infeld attended Beaumont School. She was interested in track and field from an early age and initially took up racewalking after being turned down for the Cleveland AAU track team, which took on her older sister, Maggie. While at high school she moved back into running and won four straight state titles in the 800 meters.

=== College ===
She went on to attend Georgetown University and began to compete for their Georgetown Hoyas collegiate team, following in the footsteps of her older sister. In her first major competition for the team, she was eighth in the 1500 meters at the 2009 NCAA Women's Outdoor Track and Field Championships. She established herself among the country's top college distance runners with a runner-up finish at the NCAA Women's Division I Cross Country Championship in 2010.

She placed eighth in the 3000 meters at the 2010 NCAA Outdoor Championships but had greater success the following year. She was fourth at the 2011 NCAA Cross Country, leading Georgetown to the team title. She placed second in the 5000 meters at the NCAA Outdoor Championships that year. Her best collegiate performances came in 2012 when she was a double indoor Big East Conference champion (3000 m and mile run) and was the 3000 m winner at the NCAA Indoor Championships. Turning to the outdoor season, she was runner-up in the 1500 m at the NCAA Outdoor Championships behind Katie Flood. Her personal bests in the 3000 m and 5000 m were school records.

Year	Big East XC	NCAA XC	Big East indoor	NCAA indoor	Big East Outdoor	NCAA Outdoor
2008–09	Big East XC; 20:59.7; 15th	NCAA 6k XC; 20:54.8; 60th	Mile 4:44.56 3rd	–	800 m 2:07.98 3rd	–
2009–10	Big East XC; 20:03.8; 3rd	NCAA 6k XC; 20:07.9; 8th	4 × 800 m 8:47.69 4th DMR 11:13.10 2nd 1000 m 2:48.00 3rd	DMR 11:01.40 3rd 3000 9:13.22 8th	–	–
2010–11	Big East XC; 20:42.7; 3rd	NCAA 6k XC; 20:09.2; 2nd	1500 m 4:25.00 2nd 5000 m 16:14.06 2nd	–	1500 m 4:25.00 2nd 5000 m 16:14.06 2nd	5000 m 15:38.23 2nd
2011–12		NCAA 6k XC; 19:44.3; 4th	DMR 11:08.19 1st Mile 4:43.57 1st 3000 m 9:39.39 1st	DMR 11:06.53 4th 3000 m 9:15.44 1st	4 × 800 m 8:39.35 4th 1500 m 4:23.25 2nd	1500 m 4:14.02 2nd

=== Professional ===
==== Early career (2012–2015) ====
Infeld originally intended to pursue graduate school at Georgetown University for the 2012–2013 academic year; however, she was not feeling fully invested in her graduate program, and with her college coach Chris Miltenberg and many training partners moving elsewhere, she decided to turn pro joining Kimbia Athletics (officially announced October 2012) and move to Portland, Oregon to work under coach Jerry Schumacher at the Bowerman Track Club. She began training alongside American Olympians Shalane Flanagan and Kara Goucher where she struggled to adapt to the strict training schedule at first and missed parts of the 2013 season. However, she placed 4th at the 2013 USA Cross Country Championships to qualify for the 2013 IAAF World Cross Country Championships and placed 21st. In November 2013, she was diagnosed with a stress fracture in her sacrum on the left side, and again had to take time off from running. After taking months off, she was beginning to progress with her career again, but in December 2014, she suffered another stress fracture of the sacrum; this time on the right side. She was unable to run on foot again until about 6 weeks before her first race back from injury on May 3, 2015.

In 2015, Infeld set numerous personal bests, running her first race of the year in 31:38.71 for the 10,000 meters in May and 15:07.19 for the 5000 m in June. She placed third in the 10,000 m at the 2015 USA Outdoor Track and Field Championships, her highest ever national finish up to that date, gaining selection for the national team alongside Molly Huddle and teammate Shalane Flanagan. At the 2015 Beijing World Championships on August 24, Infeld kicked hard for the bronze medal in the 10,000 m, catching a slowing Huddle at the line. All three USA team members (Infeld, Huddle, and Flanagan), were within seconds of one another. The heat and humidity impacted the race.

==== 2016 ====
On February 20, Infeld finished third in the Millrose Games women's indoor 5000 meters in 15:00.91, behind Betsy Saina and Molly Huddle. Infeld placed second in the 10,000 m behind Molly Huddle at the 2016 United States Olympic Trials (track and field) to qualify for Athletics at the 2016 Summer Olympics with Marielle Hall. In the Olympics 10,000 m event, she placed 11th in 31:26.94. On September 3 at the 5th Avenue Mile, held on the roads in New York, Infeld placed 16th in an official time of 4:28, a new personal best.

==== 2017 ====
On March 11, 2017, Infeld finished second in the U.S. 15k Road Championship in a time of 49:42. As a preparation for the 2017 USA Outdoor Track and Field Championships, Infeld participated part way through the Payton Jordan Invitational 10,000m held on May 5.

At the 2017 USA Outdoor Track and Field Championships on June 22, Infeld placed 2nd in the 10,000m, in a new personal best of 31:22.67 at the 2017 World Championships in London.

In preparation for the World Championships, Infeld travelled to St. Moritz, Switzerland to train and also competed in two events during her stay in Europe. Her first event was in Lucerne Switzerland on July 11 where she ran the 3000m and placed 5th in 8:55.41. Her second event was a 5000 m run in Huesden Belgium on July 22 where she established a personal best of 14:56.33. At the 2017 World Championships in London on August 5, Infeld placed 6th, in a personal best time of 31:20.45.

In September, Infeld placed 17th in the 5th Avenue Mile, with an official time of 4:31 (rounded up; 4:30.3 unofficially).

==== 2018 ====
Infeld started her 2018 season with a win at the 2018 USA Cross Country Championships in 33:18.7 (3:19.9/km), followed by Molly Seidel in 33:22.1, Stephanie Bruce in 33:34.1, her teammate Courtney Frerichs 33:55.1, Emily Durgin in 33:56.9, and Susan Tanui in 34:39.0; the six qualified for Team USA at 2018 NACAC Cross Country Championships in La Libertad, El Salvador on February 17, 2018.

==== 2019 ====
Infeld struggled with a number of complex injury-related obstacles for many months since early 2018, but was on a smooth trajectory in 2019 about 2 months prior to her departure at the World class Beach to Beacon 10k event. After about 18 months of not competing, on Aug 3rd Infeld surprisingly placed 4th in 32:39 at the Beach to Beacon 10k. Continuing her trend for the year in the 10k, on October 14, Infeld placed 3rd in the Boston 10k for Women in a time of 32:14. On November 2, Infeld placed 3rd in the NYRR 5k in a time of 15:47.

==== 2020 ====
Infeld started the 2020 year on the track. Notably, this was her first track race in about 2 years. At the Husky Classic on February 14, Infeld placed 1st in the 3000m in a meet record time of 8:48.73. On February 27, Infeld ran a 5000m 14:51.91 PR at the Boston University Last Chance Invitational.

==== 2021 ====
On February 20, Infeld competed in the 10,000m on the outdoor track for the first time in years. Despite this, Infeld ran the 10,000m in a time of 31:08.57 for 4th place in San Juan Capistrano, CA. However, her build-up efforts did not shine as hoped for on the day of the Olympic trials. On June 26, 2021, on an unusually warm day, Infeld ran the 10,000-meter final of the Olympic trials finishing in eighth place with a time of 32:19. She stated that "[It was] probably one of my worst races. It's never a fun place to have one of your worst races at the trials. I feel like I'm fitter than that race showcased."

==== 2025: 10,000 meter national title ====
On July 31, at the 2025 United States Outdoor Track and Field Championships, Infeld won the 10,000 meters in a time of 31:43.56. It was her first national track title.

== Personal life ==
=== Stalking ===
Beginning April 2018, and for three years thereafter (with the exception of 16 months within that time starting September/October 2018 after a protection order), Infeld was stalked, which resulted in her fear, stress, and the hiding of her location. This harassment had a significant impact on Infeld's personal life and professional career. The harasser was eventually arrested and charged in June 2021 by a U.S. Attorney with felony cyberstalking and interstate violation of a protection order.

== Statistics ==
=== Personal records ===
Surface	Event	Time (mm:ss.hh)	Venue	Date
Indoor track	1000 m	2:44.56	State College, PA	January 31, 2009
Indoor track	1500 m	4:12.79	New York (Armory), NY	February 16, 2013
Indoor track	1 mile	4:31.50	New York (Armory), NY	February 16, 2013
Indoor track	3000 m	8:48.73	Seattle, WA (oversized track)	February 14, 2020
Indoor track	5000 m	14:51.91	Boston, MA	February 27, 2020
Outdoor track	800 m	2:06.05	Princeton, NJ	May 16, 2009
Outdoor track	1500 m	4:07.77	Lignano Sabbiadoro, Italy	July 17, 2012
Outdoor track	1 mile	4:30.78	Long Island, NY	September 6, 2017
Outdoor track	3000 m	8:41.43	Rieti (Guidobaldi), Italy	September 8, 2013
Outdoor track	5000 m	14:50.90	Hilmer Lodge Stadium, Walnut, CA	May 6, 2023
Outdoor track	10000 m	30:59.38	San Juan Capistrano, CA	March 29, 2025
Road	1 mile	4:28	New York, NY	September 3, 2016
Road	10K run	31:47	Boston, MA	October 14, 2013
Road	15K run	49:42	Jacksonville, FL	March 11, 2017

=== National championships ===
Results from USA Cross Country Championships, USATF Indoor Championships, USATF Outdoor Championships, and US Olympic Trials.

Year	Competition	Venue	Position	Event	Notes
2010	2010 USA Outdoor Track and Field Championships	Des Moines, Iowa	10th	1500 m	4:19.05
2011	2011 USA Outdoor Track and Field Championships	Eugene, Oregon	5th	1500 m	4:08.96
2012	2012 United States Olympic Trials (track and field)	Eugene, Oregon	8th	5000 m	15:28.60
2013	2013 USA Cross Country Championships	St Louis, Missouri	4th	8k	26:47.7
2015	2015 USA Outdoor Track and Field Championships	Eugene, Oregon	3rd	10,000 m	31:42.60
2015	2015 USA Outdoor Track and Field Championships	Eugene, Oregon	4th	5000 m	15:07.18
2016	2016 United States Olympic Trials (track and field)	Eugene, Oregon	2nd	10,000 m	31:46.09
2016	2016 United States Olympic Trials (track and field)	Eugene, Oregon	4th	5000 m	15:13.87
2017	2017 USA Outdoor Track and Field Championships	Eugene, Oregon	2nd	10,000 m	31:22.67
2018	2018 USA Cross Country Championships	Tallahassee, Florida	1st	10,000 m	33:18.7
2021	2020 United States Olympic Trials (track and field)	Eugene, Oregon	8th	10,000 m	32:19.82
2022	2022 USA Cross Country Championships	San Diego, California	3rd	10,000 m	34:36
2022	2022 USA Outdoor Track and Field Championships	Eugene, Oregon	4th	10,000 m	31:30.04
2022	2022 USA Outdoor Track and Field Championships	Eugene, Oregon	13th	5,000 m	15:29.03
2023	2023 USA Outdoor Track and Field Championships	Eugene, Oregon	9th	5,000 m	15:24.17
2024	2024 United States Olympic Trials (track and field)	Eugene, Oregon	16th	5,000 m	16:12.03
2025	2025 USA Outdoor Track and Field Championships	Eugene, Oregon	1st	10,000 m	31:43.56

=== International championship record ===
Year	Competition	Venue	Position	Event	Notes
2013	World Cross Country Championships	Bydgoszcz, Poland	21st	Senior race	25:27
2013	World Cross Country Championships	Bydgoszcz, Poland	4th	Senior team	90 points
2015	World Championships	Beijing, China	3rd	10,000 m	31:43.49
2016	Olympic Games	Rio de Janeiro, Brazil	11th	10,000 m	31:26.94
2017	World Championships	London, United Kingdom	6th	10,000 m	31:20.45
2022	World Championships	Eugene, United States	14th	5000 m	15:29.03
2023	Pan American Games	Santiago, Chile	4th	5000 m	16:09.53
2025	World Championships	Tokyo, Japan	14th	10,000 m	31:47.65

=== Circuit performances ===
Grand Slam Track results
Slam	Race group	Event	Pl.	Time	Prize money
2025 Kingston Slam	Long distance	3000 m	8th	8:56.66	US$20,000
2025 Kingston Slam	Long distance	5000 m	4th	15:26.87	US$20,000
