= Susan Tanui =

American long-distance runner

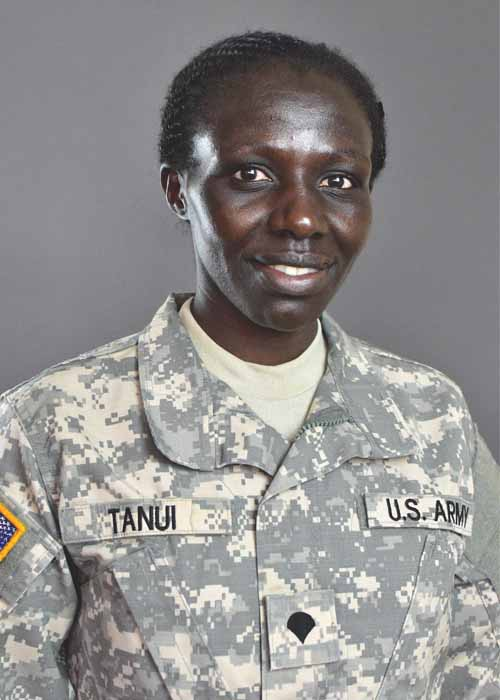
- Tanui in 2017

Personal information
- Nationality: American
- Born: March 1987 (age 39) Eldoret, Kenya
- Education: Liberty University
- Height: 5 ft 4 in (1.63 m)

Sport
- Event: 1500 m – marathon
- College team: University of Alaska Anchorage
- Club: US
- Turned pro: 2015
- Coached by: Scott Simmons

Achievements and titles
- Personal best(s): 1500 m: 4:28.78 (2013); 5000 m: 16:36.13 (2012); 10,000 m: 34:19.08 (2014); Mar: 3:06:27 (2016)
Medal record
Women's athletics
Representing the United States

Susan Tanui (born March 1987) is an American long-distance runner of Kenyan descent. She has competed in running events ranging from 1500 m to 10,000 m. She has also taken part in 5 km and half marathon events.

== NCAA ==
During her collegiate career at University of Alaska Anchorage, Tanui was the 2012 and 2013 NCAA D2 Outdoor Championships runner up taking second in the 3,000-meter steeplechase. She also had All Region as well as All-America placings in NCAA competition in cross country running and indoor track (3000 m and 5000 m). In April 2014, she was enlisted to serve in the U.S. Army.

Representing the Alaska Anchorage Seawolves
| Year | Great Northwest Athletic Conference cross country | NCAA Cross Country | Great Northwest Athletic Conference Indoor | NCAA Indoor | Great Northwest Athletic Conference Outdoor | NCAA Outdoor |
|---|---|---|---|---|---|---|
| 2013 | 6 km 1st 20:24.8 | 6K 16th 21:29.9 | | | | |
| 2012–13 | 6 km 1st place 20:37.3 | 6 km 2nd place 20:12.6 | 5000 m 1st place 17:51.26 | 5000 m 3rd place 16:37.03 | 5000 m 2nd place 17:37.08 | 5000 m 4th place 17:12.78 |
| 2012–13 | 6 km 1st place 20:37.3 | 6 km 2nd place 20:12.6 | 3000 m 1st place 9:54.95 | 3000 m 8th place 9:48.53 | 3000 m Steeplechase 1st place 10:41.88 | 3000 m Steeplechase 2nd place 10:38.36 |
| 2012–13 | 6 km 1st place 20:37.3 | 6 km 2nd place 20:12.6 | Mile 2nd place 4:58.97 | | 1500 m 4th place 4:28.78 | |
| 2012–13 | 6 km 1st place 20:37.3 | 6 km 2nd place 20:12.6 | | | 10,000 m 2nd place 36:02.84 | |
| 2011–12 | | | | | 5000 m 1st 17:31.67 | 5000 m 8th 18:00.06 |
| 2011–12 | | | | | 3000 m Steeplechase 1st place 10:24.44 | 3000 m Steeplechase 2nd place 10:28.26 |
| 2011–12 | | | | | 1500 m 2nd place 4:32.83 | |
Representing the Dallas Baptist Patriots
| Year | Heartland Conference cross country | NCCAA Cross Country | Heartland Conference Indoor | NCCAA Indoor | Heartland Conference Outdoor | NCCAA Outdoor |
| 2010–11 | 6 km 9th place 23:51.8 | | | | | 5000 m 2nd place 18:16.86 |
| 2010–11 | 6 km 9th place 23:51.8 | | | | | 3000 m Steeplechase 1st place 11:23.34 |
| 2009–10 | | | | 5000 m 9th place 19:35.44 | | 10,000 m 6th place 40:19.78 |
| 2009–10 | | | | 3000 m 20th place 11:44.87 | | |

== Professional life ==
Tanui initiated the 2018's season by winning 6th place at the USA Cross Country Championships which was led by Emily Infeld in 33:18.7 (3:19.9/km), Molly Seidel in 33:22.1, Stephanie Bruce in 33:34.1, her teammate Courtney Frerichs 33:55.1, Emily Durgin in 33:56.9, and Susan Tanui in 34:39.0 and the six qualified for Team USA at 2018 NACAC Cross Country Championships in La Libertad, El Salvador on February 17, 2018 where she placed 4th Top leading American
