= 2012 World Junior Championships in Athletics – Women's 3000 metres steeplechase =

The women's 3000 metres steeplechase at the 2012 World Junior Championships in Athletics was held at the Estadi Olímpic Lluís Companys on 10 and 12 July.

== Medalists ==
Gold	Silver	Bronze
Daisy Jepkemei; Kenya	Tejinesh Gebisa; Ethiopia	Stella Jepkosgei Rutto; Kenya

== Records ==
Prior to the competition, the existing world junior and championship records were as follows.

World Junior Record	Birtukan Adamu (ETH)	9:20.37	Rome, Italy	26 May 2011
Championship Record	Christine Kambua Muyanga (KEN)	9:31.35	Bydgoszcz, Poland	10 July 2008
World Junior Leading	Evdokiya Bukina (RUS)	10:05.73	Sochi, Russia	26 May 2012
Broken records during the 2012 World Junior Championships in Athletics
World Junior Leading	Daisy Jepkemei (KEN)	9:47.22	Barcelona, Spain	12 July 2012

== Results ==
=== Heats ===
Qualification: The first 4 of each heat (Q) and the 4 fastest times (q) qualified

Rank	Heat	Lane	Name	Nationality	Time	Note
1	2	16	Daisy Jepkemei	Kenya	9:56.33	Q, WJL
2	1	1	Tejinesh Gibesa	Ethiopia	10:01.48	Q, PB
3	1	4	Stella Jepkosgei Rutto	Kenya	10:07.13	Q, PB
4	1	16	Evdokiya Bukina	Russia	10:07.38	Q
5	1	6	Brianna Nerud	United States	10:08.15	Q, PB
6	2	14	Oona Kettunen	Finland	10:12.55	Q, PB
7	2	6	Maya Rehberg	Germany	10:14.22	Q
8	1	17	Pippa Woolven	Great Britain	10:19.28	q
9	2	4	Tessa Potezny	Australia	10:22.55	Q, PB
10	2	15	Yeabsira Bitew	Ethiopia	10:22.84	q
11	2	7	Adeline Elena Panaet	Romania	10:23.07	q
12	1	7	Oksana Rayta	Ukraine	10:28.27	q
13	1	5	Anastasiya Puzakova	Belarus	10:30.83	
14	2	1	Belén Casetta	Argentina	10:33.84	
15	1	11	Dana Elena Loghin	Romania	10:35.06	
16	2	8	Courtney Frerichs	United States	10:35.24	
17	1	9	Cornelia Griesche	Germany	10:36.38	
18	1	13	Hallouma Jerfel	Tunisia	10:37.83	PB
19	2	17	Viktoriya Kalyuzhna	Ukraine	10:39.33	
20	1	3	Minttu Hukka	Finland	10:39.73	PB
21	2	13	Hadjer Soukhal	Algeria	10:43.25	PB
22	2	12	Zulema Arenas	Peru	10:47.38	
23	1	14	Anna Quílez	Spain	10:47.42	PB
24	2	2	Kristina Božic	Croatia	10:49.82	PB
25	2	11	Sveva Fascetti	Italy	10:57.98	
26	2	9	Beatriz Caspar	Spain	11:00.65	
27	2	5	Diana Almeida	Portugal	11:08.14	
28	1	10	Carolina Lozano	Argentina	11:10.51	
29	1	12	Sahsenem Seri	Turkey	11:13.18	
30	1	15	C. Jayamini Ranawakearachchilage	Sri Lanka	11:13.91	
31	1	18	Helena Tlustá	Czech Republic	11:19.49	
32	1	2	Lucy Basilio	Peru	11:20.23	
33	2	3	Sarah Lahti	Sweden	11:23.61	
34	2	10	Nikolina Hrelec	Croatia	11:35.05	
35	1	8	Ting-Yu Li	Chinese Taipei	12:14.65	

=== Final ===
Rank	Name	Nationality	Time	Note
1st place, gold medalist(s)	Daisy Jepkemei	Kenya	9:47.22	WJL
2nd place, silver medalist(s)	Tejinesh Gebisa	Ethiopia	9:50.51	PB
3rd place, bronze medalist(s)	Stella Jepkosgei Rutto	Kenya	9:50.58	PB
4	Evdokia Bukina	Russia	9:56.46	NJ
5	Brianna Nerud	United States	10:00.72	NJ
6	Maya Rehberg	Germany	10:03.09	PB
7	Oona Kettunen	Finland	10:03.15	PB
8	Adelina Elena Panaet	Romania	10:19.34	SB
9	Pippa Woolven	Great Britain	10:27.95	
10	Tessa Potezny	Australia	10:28.33	
11	Yeabsira Bitew	Ethiopia	10:30.62	
12	Oksana Rayta	Ukraine	10:35.40	

== Participation ==
According to an unofficial count, 35 athletes from 24 countries participated in the event.

- Algeria (1)
- Argentina (2)
- Australia (1)
- Belarus (1)
- Chinese Taipei (1)
- Croatia (2)
- Czech Republic (1)
- Ethiopia (2)
- Finland (2)
- Germany (2)
- Italy (1)
- Kenya (2)
- Peru (2)
- Portugal (1)
- Romania (2)
- Russia (1)
- Spain (2)
- Sri Lanka (1)
- Sweden (1)
- Tunisia (1)
- Turkey (1)
- Ukraine (2)
- United Kingdom (1)
- United States (2)
