= Stephanie Bruce =

American long-distance runner

Stephanie Rothstein Bruce
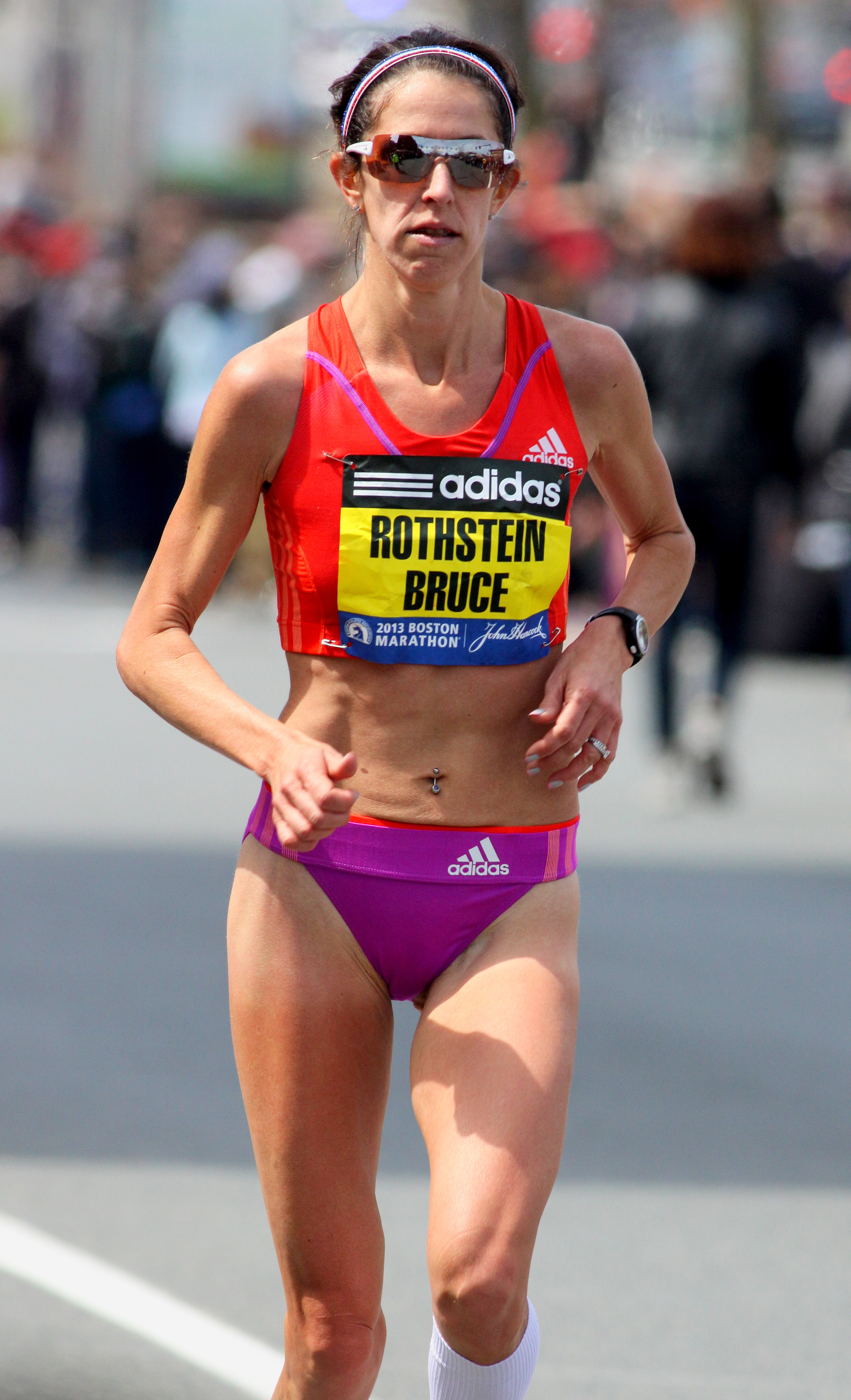
- Stephanie Rothstein Bruce at 2013 Boston Marathon

Personal information
- Born: Stephanie Rothstein; January 14, 1984 (age 42)
- Life partner: Ben Bruce
- Website: www.stephbruce.com

Sport
- Country: United States
- Sport: Track and field
- Event(s): 10,000 metres, Marathon
- Club: Tracksmith

Achievements and titles
- Personal best: Marathon: 2:27:47 (Chicago 2019)

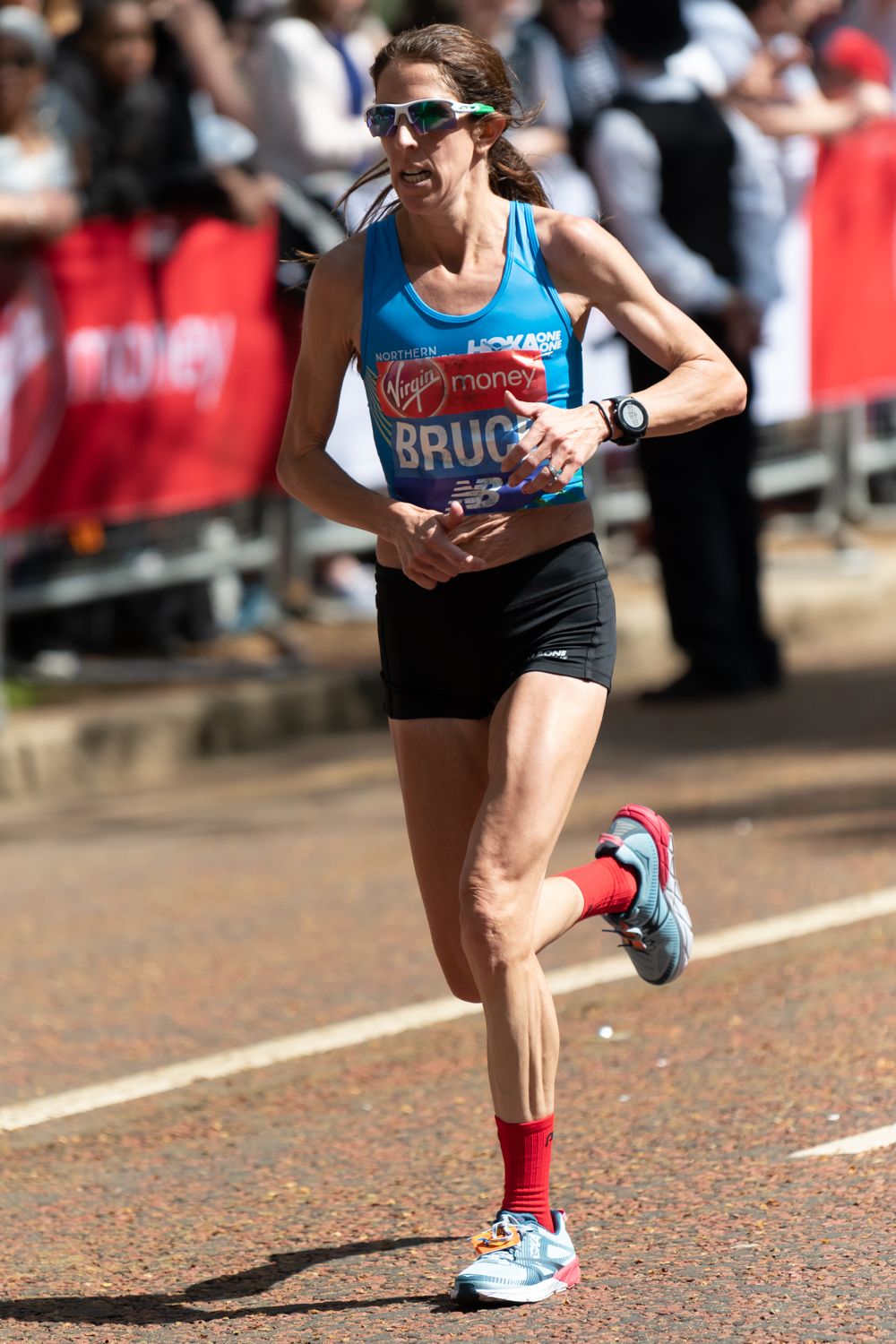
Post-pregnancy Stephanie Bruce at 2018 London Marathon

Stephanie Bruce (née Rothstein; born January 14, 1984) is an American long-distance runner.

== Running career ==
=== NCAA ===
Stephanie Bruce smashed Katie Apenrodt's 10,000 meter UCSB school record by over a minute and a half in 2006 with her then 10 km PR of 33:27.85. Bruce is an NCAA Division 1 All-American, Big West Conference cross country champion, and league title-holder in the 5k and the 10k. She is also the 2006 Big West Conference Athlete of the Year, and 2006 NACAC Under-23 10,000 meters champion.

=== USATF ===
Bruce placed first with a time of 32:21 (her personal best 10k time), winning her first U.S. national title on July 4 at the 2018 AJC Peachtree Road Race which hosted the USATF 10km road championships, ahead of runner-up Aliphine Tuliamuk, Sara Hall and Allie Kieffer. This victory came two weeks after finishing 3rd at 10,000 meters on the track in 32:05.05 at 2018 USA Outdoor Track and Field Championships in Des Moines, Iowa at Drake University.

=== International career ===
She finished 19th at the 2010 IAAF World Half Marathon Championships. She won the 2012 Big Sur Half Marathon.

Bruce competed at the 2017 IAAF World Cross Country Championships, where she finished 22nd - the highest place for a non-African-born runner.

Bruce started her 2018 season with a 3rd place finish at the 2018 USA Cross Country Championships, led by Emily Infeld in 33:18.7 (3:19.9/km), Molly Seidel in 33:22.1, Bruce in 33:34.1, Infield's teammate Courtney Frerichs in 33:55.1, Emily Durgin in 33:56.9, and Susan Tanui in 34:39.0. The six qualified for Team USA at the 2018 NACAC Cross Country Championships in La Libertad, El Salvador on February 17, 2018. Throughout the entire race Bruce was among the leaders, and moved into 3rd after 4 km. Bruce maintained a pace of approximately 3:21/km.

In 2019, she competed in the senior women's race at the 2019 IAAF World Cross Country Championships held in Aarhus, Denmark. She finished in 33rd place.

In 2021, she finished as the 10th woman in the NY Marathon in a time of 2:31:05 <Track and Field Magazine>

== Internet fame ==
Bruce gained fame for posting a photograph of her abdomen after giving birth that went viral.

== Sponsorship ==
She is sponsored by Hoka One One while running for Northern Arizona Elite (NAZ Elite).

As of 2025, Bruce will no longer be part of Northern Arizona Elite or be sponsored by Hoka One One.
