= Ameer Webb =

American sprinter (born 1991)

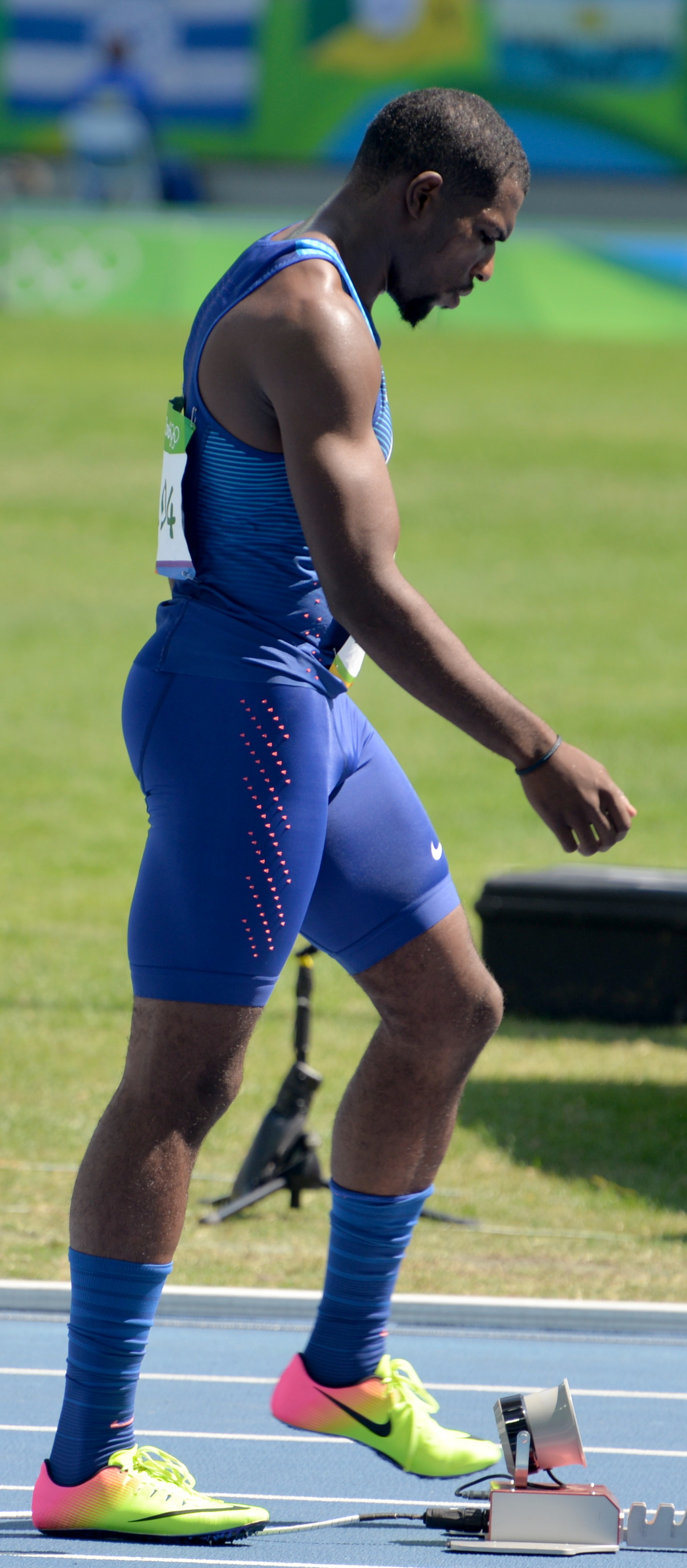
- Webb at the 2016 Summer Olympics

Personal information
- Full name: Ameer Kenneth Webb
- Born: March 19, 1991 (age 35) Carson, California, U.S.
- Education: Texas A&M University
- Height: 5 ft 11 in (181 cm)
- Weight: 181 lb (82 kg)

Sport
- Sport: Track and field
- Event: Sprints
- Club: ALTIS
- Team: Nike
- Turned pro: 2013
- Coached by: Stuart McMillan

Achievements and titles
- Personal bests: 100 m – 9.94 (2016); 200 m – 19.85 (2016); 400 m – 47.72 (2015)
Medal record
Men's athletics
Representing the United States
Athletics World Cup (Note: Not to be confused with the IAAF World Cup.)
Bronze medal – third place	2018 London	200 m
World Relays
Silver medal – second place	2017 Nassau	4×200 m relay

Ameer Kenneth Webb (born March 19, 1991) is an American sprinter specializing in the 100 m and 200 m.

== College career ==
At Texas A&M, Webb was the 200 meter champion at the 2013 NCAA Division I Indoor Championships and the 2013 NCAA Outdoor Championships. Prior to Texas A&M he ran for Cerritos College, where he was the 2011 CCCAA State Champion in both the 100 meters and 200 meters. He had run for Tustin High School, finishing fifth in the 200 meters at the 2009 CIF California State Meet behind Randall Carroll's sweep of both sprinting events. Webb was a dual-sport student-athlete (track & field and football) at Tustin High for all 3 and 1/2 years he attended there. He attended a small charter school during his first semester of his junior year. The charter school had no sports program. He returned to Tustin for his second semester of his junior year. As a senior, he started both ways and helped lead the football team to its first CIF championship title game in a decade. They eventually fell to a Ronnie Hillman-led La Habra football team.

== Professional career ==
He competed at the 2014 IAAF World Relays in the finals, but due to his involvement in an exchange infraction the team was disqualified.

Webb won the 200 meters at the 2016 Qatar Athletic Super Grand Prix with a meet record of 19.85 (+1.9 m/s). That time ranks him tied with John Capel, Konstadinos Kederis and Nickel Ashmeade as the number 25 performer in history. He competed at the 2016 Olympics., reaching the semi-finals. On June 25, 2017, Webb won the 200 meters at the 2017 USA Outdoor Track and Field Championships with a time of 20.09 seconds, thus qualifying for the 2017 World Championships in Athletics.

== Statistics ==
Information from IAAF profile or Track & Field Results Reporting System unless otherwise noted.

=== Personal bests ===
- w = wind-assisted (more than +2.0 m/s)
- WL = world lead (fastest time in the year)

Event	Time	Wind (m/s)	Venue	Date	Notes
100 m	9.94	+1.0	Rome, Italy	June 2, 2016	
100 m	9.90 w	+2.4	Norwalk, California, U.S.	April 16, 2016	Wind-assisted
200 m	19.85	+1.9	Doha, Qatar	May 6, 2016	
200 m indoor	20.37	n/a	Fayetteville, Arkansas, U.S.	March 8, 2013	Indoor WL
4×100 m relay	38.41	n/a	Monaco	July 21, 2017	
4×200 m relay	1:19.88	n/a	Nassau, Bahamas	April 23, 2017	

=== International championship results ===
- PB = personal best

Year	Championship	Position	Event	Time	Wind (m/s)	Venue	Notes
Representing the United States
2014	World Relays	DQ	4×200 m relay	—	n/a	Nassau, Bahamas	Passing outside zone
2015	NACAC Championships	4th (semi 3)	200 m	20.91	+0.8	San José, Costa Rica	
2016	Olympic Games	6th (semi 2)	200 m	20.43	−0.3	Rio de Janeiro, Brazil	
2017	World Relays	2nd	4×200 m relay	1:19.88	n/a	Nassau, Bahamas	PB
2017	World Championships	5th	200 m	20.26	−0.1	London, England	
2018	Athletics World Cup	3rd	200 m	20.51	−1.1	London, England	

=== National championship results ===
- w = wind-assisted (more than +2.0 m/s)
- PB = personal best
- SB = seasonal best

Year	Championship	Position	Event	Time	Wind (m/s)	Venue	Notes
Representing the Texas A&M Aggies
2012	NCAA Division I Indoor Championships	17th	60 m	6.67	n/a	Nampa, Idaho	
2012	NCAA Division I Indoor Championships	1st	200 m	20.57	n/a	Nampa, Idaho	
2012	NCAA Division I Championships	2nd	200 m	20.65	−4.2	Des Moines, Iowa	
2012	NCAA Division I Championships	4th	4×100 m relay	39.08	n/a	Des Moines, Iowa	
2013	NCAA Division I Indoor Championships	1st	200 m	20.42	n/a	Fayetteville, Arkansas	
2013	NCAA Division I Championships	6th	100 m	10.14 w	+3.2	Eugene, Oregon	Wind-assisted
2013	NCAA Division I Championships	1st	200 m	20.10 w	+2.6	Eugene, Oregon	Wind-assisted
Representing Nike
2013	U.S. Championships	4th	200 m	20.20	+1.6	Des Moines, Iowa	PB
2014	U.S. Championships	14th	200 m	20.74 w	+2.1	Sacramento, California	Wind-assisted
2015	U.S. Championships	23rd	100 m	10.15	+1.3	Eugene, Oregon	SB
2015	U.S. Championships	6th	200 m	20.30	+0.4	Eugene, Oregon	
2016	U.S. Olympic Trials	3rd	200 m	20.00	+1.6	Eugene, Oregon	
2017	U.S. Championships	1st	200 m	20.09	−2.3	Sacramento, California	SB
2018	U.S. Championships	1st	200 m	20.47	−1.9	Des Moines, Iowa	
2019	U.S. Championships	7th	100 m	10.23	−1.0	Des Moines, Iowa	
2019	U.S. Championships	3rd	200 m	20.45	−0.7	Des Moines, Iowa	SB

=== 200 m circuit wins ===
Representing Nike

- IAAF Diamond League
  - Doha: 2016
  - Rome: 2016
  - London: 2017
