= Stella Rutto =

Romanian steeplechaser (born 1996)

Personal information
- Full name: Stella Jepkosgei Rutto
- Nationality: Kenya (until 21 February 2022); Romania
- Born: 12 December 1996 (age 29) Kenya
- Height: 156 cm (5 ft 1 in)
- Weight: 53 kg (117 lb)

Sport
- Sport: Sport of athletics
- Events: 3000 metres steeplechase Half marathon

Achievements and titles
- National finals: 2015 Kenyan Champs; • 3000m s'chase, 5th; 2019 Kenyan Champs; • 3000m s'chase, 7th; 2020 Romanian Champs; • 3000m s'chase, 1st (gold); • 5000m, 1st (gold); 2021 Turkish Champs; • 3000m s'chase, 1st (gold); 2023 Romanian Indoors; • 3000m, 1st (gold); 2023 Romanian 5K Champs; • 5km, road, 1st (gold)
- Personal bests: 3000mSC: 9:25.31 (2024); HM: 1:07:45 (2021)
Medal record
Women's athletics
Representing Kenya
World U20 Championships
Bronze medal – third place	2012 Barcelona	3000 m s'chase
African U18 Championships
Silver medal – second place	2013 Warri	2000 m s'chase
African U20 Championships
Gold medal – first place	2015 Addis Ababa	3000 m s'chase
Balkan Championships
Disqualified	2020 Cluj-Napoca	3000 m s'chase
Disqualified	2020 Cluj-Napoca	5000 m
- Updated on 4 April 2024

Stella Jepkosgei Rutto (born 12 December 1996) is a Kenyan-Romanian steeplechase runner. Representing Kenya, she won a bronze medal in the 3000 metres steeplechase at the 2012 World U20 Championships. On 21 February 2022, she changed her international allegiance from Kenya to Romania.

== Career ==
Rutto began competing as early as 2012, finishing runner-up at the Kenyan U20 Championships and winning a bronze medal at the 2012 World U20 Championships at age 15. Rutto said after the competition, "I started too late in the last lap to fight for the silver [...] I am happy for Daisy and to obtain this second medal for my country, even if it is only the bronze medal."

At the 2013 African U18 Championships, Rutto won a silver medal in the 2000 metres steeplechase, losing only to countrywoman Daisy Jepkemei who had beat her in 2012 as well. Two years later, Rutto won her last age-group medal at the 2015 African U20 Championships, winning the 3000 m steeplechase and helping Kenya place 5th in the medal standings.

In 2019, Rutto first competed in Romania, winning the Romanian International Championships steeplechase and 5000 metres as well as placing 7th in that year's Kenyan Athletics Championships steeple. After winning the 2020 Romanian Athletics Championships in the 5000 m and steeplechase, she won the same two events at the 2020 Balkan Athletics Championships but was later disqualified as she had not yet been cleared to represent Romania internationally.

Competing as a foreign national, Rutto won the 2021 Turkish Athletics Championships steeplechase and ran several half marathons in Turkey that year, debuting at 1:07:45 to win the Trabzon Half Marathon. In May 2021 Rutto became a Romanian citizen. On 21 February 2022, Rutto was cleared by World Athletics to represent Romania in international competitions. She finished 8th at the 2024 Diamond League Shanghai in the steeplechase.

== Personal life ==
Born on 12 December 1996 and originally from Kenya, Rutto first competed in Romania in 2019. Despite competing at Romanian and Turkish national championships, she was not officially cleared to represent Romania until 2022.

== Statistics ==
=== Personal best progression ===
3000m Steeplechase progression
#	Mark	Pl.	Competition	Venue	Date	Ref.
1	10:07.4	2nd place, silver medalist(s)	Kenyan U20 Championships	Nairobi, Kenya	8 Jun 2012	
2	10:07.13	(silver) (Heat 1)	2012 World U20 Championships in Athletics	Barcelona, Spain	10 Jul 2012	
3	9:50.58	3rd place, bronze medalist(s)	2012 World U20 Championships in Athletics	Barcelona, Spain	12 Jul 2012	
4	9:49.09	(bronze) (Heat 1)	Kenyan Athletics Championships	Nairobi, Kenya	9 Jul 2015	
5	9:44.07	1st place, gold medalist(s)	Romanian International Championships	Cluj-Napoca, Romania	6 Jun 2019	
6	9:32.90	1st place, gold medalist(s)	Romanian Athletics Championships	Cluj-Napoca, Romania	3 Sep 2020	
7	9:25.31	8th	Yangtze Delta Athletics Diamond Gala	Suzhou, China	26 Apr 2024	
