= Courtney Frerichs =

American middle-distance runner, steeplechase specialist (born 1993)

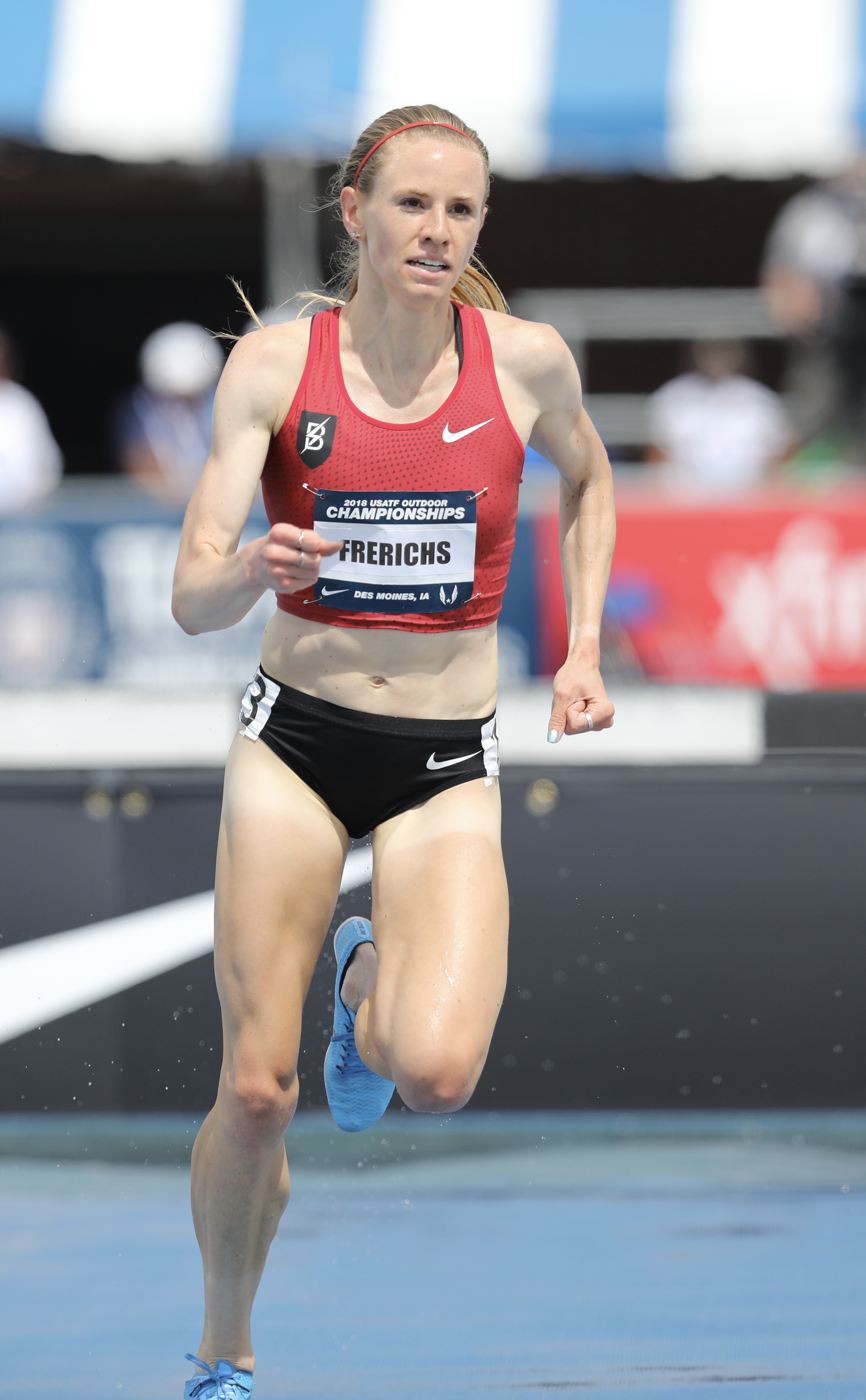
- Frerichs at the 2018 USA Outdoor Track and Field Championships

Personal information
- Born: January 18, 1993 (age 33) Mundelein, Illinois, U.S.
- Height: 5 ft 7 in (170 cm)
- Weight: 117 lb (53 kg)

Sport
- Sport: Track and field
- Event: 3000 metres steeplechase
- College team: Missouri–KC Kangaroos; New Mexico Lobos
- Club: Nike; Bowerman Track Club
- Turned pro: 2016

Achievements and titles
- Olympic finals: 2016 Rio de Janeiro; 3000 m s’chase - 11th; 2020 Tokyo; 3000 m s’chase - Silver
- World finals: 2017 London; 3000 m s’chase - Silver; 2019 Doha; 3000 m s’chase - 7th
- Personal bests: 3000 m s’chase: 8:57.77 AR (Eugene 2021); 5000 m: 14:50.06 (Portland 2020); 1500 m: 4:07.39 (Portland 2020)
Medal record
Women's athletics
Representing the United States
Olympic Games
Silver medal – second place	2020 Tokyo	3000 m s’chase
World Championships
Silver medal – second place	2017 London	3000 m s’chase
Representing the Americas
IAAF Continental Cup
Silver medal – second place	2018 Ostrava	3000 m s’chase

Courtney Frerichs (born January 18, 1993) is an American middle-distance runner and steeplechase specialist from Nixa, Missouri, She is a three-time silver medalist in the 3000 meters steeplechase capturing silver at the 2020 Tokyo Olympic Games, the 2017 World Championships in London and at the 2018 World (Continental) Cup in Ostrava. In 2021, she became the first American woman to run under nine-minutes in a women's 3000-meters steeplechase event with a time of 8:57.77; establishing an American and Area record. She is a two-time Olympian making the US team in 2016 and 2020. In both of her Olympic Trials she finished second to US National Champion, Emma Coburn.

Frerichs made history at the 2017 World Championships where she and her teammate, Emma Coburn, finished 1–2 in the 3000-meters women's steeplechase, with Coburn taking home the gold and Frerichs the silver medal, thus becoming the first female Americans to win the gold and silver medal in any individual World Championships or Olympics race longer than 400 meters since the 1912 Stockholm Games. In that race, they outran four of the five fastest women in the world which included the world record holder and 2016 Olympic gold medalist, Ruth Jebet, the defending champion and 2016 Olympic silver medalist, Hyvin Jepkemoi, the number one ranked runner in 2017, Beatrice Chepkoech, and Celliphine Chespol, second fastest in the world.

On July 20, 2018, at the Herculis meet in Monaco, she finished in second place behind Beatrice Chepkoech's world record 8:44.32 performance. Frerichs' time of 9:00.85 moved her ahead of Coburn for the American and North American (NACAC) records in the steeplechase and to 6th place on the all-time fastest list. Frerichs won the steeplechase NCAA title at the 2016 NCAA Division I Outdoor Track and Field Championships as a Lobo, setting a collegiate record of 9:24.41.

== High school ==
As a Senior at Nixa Public High School, Courtney Frerichs earned all-conference, all-district, team MVP, KSPR-TV Athlete of the Week in cross country. Frerichs posted a freshman season-best time of 2:24 in 800 meters. She also set school records in the 5K (18:12), triple jump 10.505 m (34 ft 5 1/2 in), and her team posted the best time for the 4x800-meter relay (10:02). Frerichs lettered for four years in soccer as a midfielder/forward where she earned All-district honors and was a two-time regional qualifier in gymnastics. In 2010, she was a level 9 gymnast. Frerichs attributes her accomplishments to gymnastics, strength training, and her teammates.

== NCAA ==
Courtney Frerichs won the steeplechase national title at the 2016 NCAA Division I Outdoor Track and Field Championships as a Lobo, setting a collegiate record of 9:24.41 As of July 2017, Frerichs has run 4 of the 10 fastest times in US collegian history. She finished her career with four of the top 10 steeplechase times in NCAA history between her time at New Mexico and UMKC, and was a semifinalist for the Bowerman Award. Frerichs earned seven NCAA Division I All-American honors competing in Cross Country, and Indoor and Outdoor Track and Field for the UMKC Kangaroos and the New Mexico Lobos. On grass in 2015, Frerichs captured her third All-American honor in cross country with a fourth-place finish of 19:48.0 at the NCAA Championships, leading the New Mexico Lobos to a dominant national championship victory.

Representing the University of Missouri–Kansas City
Year	Conference cross country	NCAA Cross Country	Conference Indoor	NCAA Indoor	Conference Outdoor	NCAA Outdoor	USA Championships	International
2011-12	Summit League -	-	3000 10:02.06 4th 5000 17:33.79 10th	-	-	3000 SC 10:55.29 80th	3000 SC 10:35.23 2nd	3000 SC 10:35.24 16th
2012-13	Summit League -	-	3000 9:51.26 1st 5000 17:02.31 1st	-	3000 SC 10:15.79 1st 5000 16:42.63 1st	3000 SC 9:55.02 6th		
2013-14	WAC 2nd 17:35.7	38th 20:44.4	3000 9:35.89 1st 5000 17:45.89 1st;	-	-	-	3000 SC 9:43.36 6th	3000 SC 10:10.51 4th
2014-15	WAC 1st 16:51.7	13th 20:17.1	3000 10:35.96 1st 5000 18:37.69 1st	5000 15:47.56 5th	3000 SC 10:15.41 1st 5000 17:26.99 1st	3000 SC 9:31.36 2nd	3000 SC 9:46.24 7th	-
Representing the University of New Mexico Lobos
2015-16	MWC 2nd 22:05.2	4th 19:47.9	-	-	1500 4:25.77 2nd	3000 SC 9:24.41 1st	3000 SC 9:20.92 2nd	3000 SC Olympic 9:22.87 11th

=== Early championship races ===
Courtney placed sixteenth in 2012 World Junior Championships in Athletics – Women's 3000 metres steeplechase.

Frerichs finished 14th at 2012 Junior USA Cross Country Championships.

Courtney Frerichs placed fourth 2014 NACAC U23 Steeplechase.

== Professional ==
=== 2016 ===
Frerichs placed 11th at Athletics at the 2016 Summer Olympics – Women's 3000 metres steeplechase running 9:22.87. Frerichs represented USA at Athletics at the 2016 Summer Olympics.

=== 2017 ===
Courtney placed 4th at the 2017 USATF Cross Country Championships in Bend, Oregon.

Frerichs placed 2nd in the steeplechase at 2017 USA Outdoor Track and Field Championships running 9:22.23, and commenting, "Having a positive mindset is huge": Improving substantially, she placed 2nd at 2017 World Championships in Athletics running a then personal best of 9:03.77.

=== 2018 ===
Courtney started her 2018 season with a 33:55.1, 4th place in 10 km at the 2018 USA Cross Country Championships. The finishing times for her teammates were Emily Infeld in 33:18.7 (3:19.9/km), Molly Seidel 33:22.1, Stephanie Bruce 33:34.1, Emily Durgin 33:56.9, and Susan Tanui 34:39.0. The six qualified for Team USA at 2018 NACAC Cross Country Championships in La Libertad, El Salvador on February 17, 2018. Frerichs was among leaders until the final lap. During the last 2 km, Courtney maintained a pace of approximately 3:23/km.

Frerichs placed 2nd in the steeplechase at 2018 USA Outdoor Track and Field Championships running 9:18.69.

Frerichs set an American Record in the 3000 meter steeplechase, running 9:00.85, finishing in second place.

Frerichs was selected to represent Team Americas and placed 2nd in the steeplechase at 2018 IAAF Continental Cup running 9:15.22.

=== 2019 ===
Frerichs began her 2019 season with a 6th place in 10 km at the 2019 USA Cross Country Championships. On June 30, 2019, she ran 9:09.75 to place fifth behind world record holder Beatrice Chepkoech in the star-studded Diamond League steeple at the Prefontaine Classic held in Stanford, California. In Des Moines, Iowa on July 28, running 9:26.61, Frerichs finished second at the 2019 USA Track & Field Outdoor Championships, in the steeplechase to Emma Coburn, who ran 9:25.63 and who was the defending World Champion from 2017. Each qualified for the 2019 World Championships in Doha, Qatar in September and Frerichs finished 6th in the 3000 M Steeplechase in a time of 9:11.27.

=== 2021 ===
Frerichs placed second in steeplechase behind Emma Coburn at the 2020 US Olympic Trials to qualify to represent the United States at the 2020 Summer Olympics. She won the silver medal at the Olympics with a time of 9:04.79, finishing behind Peruth Chemutai and ahead of Hyvin Kiyeng Jepkemoi.

=== Competition record ===
Year	Competition	Venue	Position	Event	Notes
Representing United States
2022	World Championships	Eugene, United States	6th	3000 m SC	9:10.59
2021	Olympic Games	Tokyo, Japan	2nd	3000 m SC	9:04.79
2019	World Championships	Doha, Qatar	6th	3000 m SC	9:11.27
2018	2018 IAAF Continental Cup	Ostrava, Czech Republic	2nd	3000 m SC	9:15.22
2017	World Championships	London, United Kingdom	2nd	3000 m SC	9:03.77
2016	Summer Olympics	Rio de Janeiro, Brazil	11th	3000 m SC	9:22.87
2014	NACAC U-23 Championships	Kamloops, British Columbia, Canada	4th	3000 m SC	10:10.51
2012	World U-20 Championships	Barcelona, Catalonia, Spain	16th	3000 m SC	10:35.24
USATF Championships
2022	USA Outdoor Track and Field Championships	Eugene, Oregon	3rd	3000 m SC	9:16.18
2021	United States Olympic trials	Eugene, Oregon	2nd	3000 m SC	9:11.79
2020	USA Indoor Track and Field Championships	Albuquerque, New Mexico	5th	3000 m	8:57.15
2019	USA Outdoor Track and Field Championships	Des Moines, Iowa	2nd	3000 m SC	9:26.61
2019	USA Cross Country Championships	Apalachee Regional Park, Tallahassee, Florida	6th	10 km	33:25
2018	USA Outdoor Track and Field Championships	Des Moines, Iowa	2nd	3000 m SC	9:18.69
2018	USA Cross Country Championships	Tallahassee, Florida	4th	10 km	33:55.1
2017	USA Outdoor Track and Field Championships	Sacramento, California	2nd	3000 m SC	9:22.23
2016	United States Olympic Trials	Eugene, Oregon	2nd	3000 m SC	9:20.92
2015	USA Outdoor Track and Field Championships	Eugene, Oregon	7th	3000 m SC	9:46.24
2014	USA Outdoor Track and Field Championships	Sacramento, California	6th	3000 m SC	9:43.36
2012	IAAF World Championship U-20 Trials	Bloomington, Indiana	2nd	3000 m SC	10:35.23
2012	USA Cross Country Championships	St Louis, Missouri	14th	6 km	22:08.6
