= Chelsea Hayes =

American track and field athlete (born 1988)

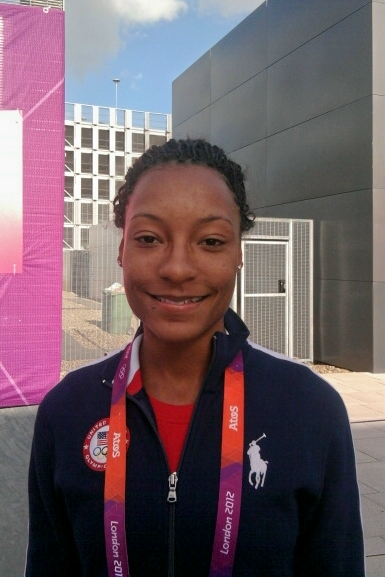
- Hayes at The London 2012 Summer Olympic Games

Personal information
- Full name: Chelsea Alicia Hayes
- Born: February 9, 1988 (age 38) New Orleans
- Height: 5 ft 5 in (165 cm)

Sport
- Country: United States
- Sport: Track and field
- Event(s): Long jump, 100-meter dash
- College team: Louisiana Tech
- Club: Nike
- Coached by: Shawn Jackson

Achievements and titles
- Personal best(s): Long jump (outdoor): 7.10m 100 meters: 11.15

Chelsea Alicia Hayes (born February 9, 1988) is an American track and field athlete who competes primarily in the long jump and 100-meter dash. Her personal records for the events are 7.10 m (23 ft 3 1/2 in) and 11.15 seconds, respectively.

In 2012, she was runner up at the NCAA Indoor Championship in long jump and finished third at the Outdoor Championships. She won the 2011–12 Joe Kearney Award, an award given to the Western Athletic Conference's top student-athlete. At the 2012 US Olympic Trials, she jumped a new personal best en route to a second-place finish. In so doing, she became the first ever track and field athlete from Louisiana Tech to represent the United States at the Olympics.

== Early life ==
Chelsea Alicia Hayes was born February 9, 1988, in New Orleans, Louisiana to mother Joyce Hayes. She has three brothers - Shawn, Keegan and Kenji Hayes. For high school, Chelsea attended Marion Abramson Senior High School, where she played basketball and competed in track and field, only taking up the latter for the first time in her junior year. Displaced by Hurricane Katrina, she attended high school in multiple states during her senior year before graduating from Marion Abramson. She received MVP honors for track. After high school, Hayes attended Butler Community College for two years before transferring to Louisiana Tech, where she graduated in 2012 with a degree in nursing.

== Athletic career ==
During her college career, Hayes set eight school records at Butler Community College. At Louisiana Tech, she was a 14-time Western Athletic Conference (WAC) champion in track and field and 15-time first team All-WAC member. She was named "WAC Female Track Athlete of the Year" four times and set nine conference records. She is the only athlete in history to win both the WAC "track athlete of the week" and "field athlete of week" simultaneously, and did so twice. By graduation, she owned all ten of LA Tech's ten longest long jumps in history, and nine of the ten fastest 100-meter runs. In 2011 and 2012, she was named a first team All-American in the indoor long jump. She was a second team All-American in the 60 meters and outdoor long jump.

In 2012, Hayes was runner up t the NCAA Indoor Championship in long jump with a mark of 6.61 metres (21.7 ft). At the Outdoor Championships, she placed third in the event with a distance of 6.58 metres (21.6 ft). She finished seventh in the 100-meter dash with a time of 11.58s. At the end of the season, she was named All-Louisiana in five events: the 100-meters, the 200-meters, the 4x100-meter relay, the 4x400-meter relay, and the long jump. Additionally, she won the 2011-12 Joe Kearney Award, the WAC's top award, given yearly to the top student-athlete. She was the first Louisiana Tech student to win the award.

Hayes qualified for the 2012 US Olympic Trials, but was not expected to do much; a commentator for NBC called her "unheralded and unknown". She advanced to the finals of the long jump, and was in fifth place when the field was cut to eight with three jumps to go. She remained in fifth until her final attempt, when she scored 7.10 metres (23.3 ft). The distance exceeded her personal best by nearly one and half feet (half a meter) and won her second place. Additionally, the jump was the fourth longest in the world for the year, up until that point. Hayes qualified for the Olympic team, becoming the first ever track and field athlete from Louisiana Tech to represent the United States at the Olympics. Previously, fellow LA Tech alumna Olivia McKoy represented Jamaica during the 2000 and 2008 Games. Two days later, she remarked, "I'm still in shock about it ... Words can't explain it. I'm so excited. It's crazy." Hayes also competed in the 100-meter dash at the Trials, but failed to make the finals.

Her trip to London for the 2012 Summer Olympics will be Hayes' first ever trip outside the United States. She competed in the qualifying round of the long jump on August 7 but did not progress to the final.

Also in 2012, Hayes was named the "Field Athlete of the Year" by the Louisiana Sports Writers Association. She is coached by Shawn Jackson.
