= Kimberlyn Duncan =

American sprinter (born 1991)

Personal information
- Born: August 2, 1991 (age 34) Katy, Texas, U.S.
- Education: LSU Tigers
- Height: 5 ft 8 in (173 cm)

Sport
- Country: United States
- Sport: Track and field
- Event(s): 100 meters, 200 meters

Achievements and titles
- Personal best(s): 100 m: 10.96 s (2012); 200 m: 22.19 s (2012)

Kimberlyn Duncan
Medal record

Women's athletics

Representing the United States

World Championships
	2013 Moscow	200 m
	2017 London	200 m

World Relay Championships
Gold medal – first place	2014 Nassau	4 × 200 m relay
Silver medal – second place	2015 Nassau	4 × 100 m relay

Kimberlyn Duncan (born August 2, 1991) is an American track and field athlete, specializing in the sprints. She was the 2013 American champion at 200 metres, having defeated Olympic champion Allyson Felix with a strong stretch run. Her time of 21.80 seconds from that race at the 2013 USA Outdoor Track and Field Championships would have ranked her as the 14th fastest female of all time, had it not been wind aided. She was 42nd on that 2013 list, from a qualifying heat at the NCAA Championships on the same Drake Stadium track a year earlier.

== Education ==
Duncan was a standout athlete at Cypress Springs High School near her hometown in Katy, Texas, graduating in 2009. She ran track collegiately at Louisiana State University, where she became the first woman to win the NCAA Championships 200 meters back to back, both indoors and outdoors.

== Career ==
At the 2012 NACAC Under-23 Championships in Athletics she again won the 200 meters in record time and anchored the victorious USA 4 × 100 metres relay team. A few weeks later, she anchored the USA "Blue" team to the meet record at Herculis.

At 2013 USA Outdoor Track and Field Championships, Duncan earned gold medal in the 200 meters and placed 21st in the 100 meters.

At 2014 USA Outdoor Track and Field Championships, Duncan earned silver medal in the 200 meters.

At 2015 Mt SAC Relays, Duncan's 200 meter time has her ranked 31st in the world. Duncan finished 16th in 100 metres and 10th in 200 metres 2015 USA Outdoor Track and Field Championships.

Duncan finished 21st in 100 metres and 35th in 200 metres at the 2016 United States Olympic Trials (track and field).

Duncan finished 9th in 100 metres and 2nd in 200 metres at the 2017 USA Outdoor Track and Field Championships.

== Honors and awards ==
She is the 2012 recipient of The Bowerman, the highest award for a collegiate track and field athlete. She won the Honda Sports Award as the nation's best female track and field competitor in 2011 and repeated in 2012.

== USA Track and field National Championships ==
Year	Competition	Venue	Position	Event	Notes
2011	USA Outdoor Track and Field Championships	Eugene, Oregon	5th	200 m	22.35
2012	2012 United States Olympic Trials (track and field)	Eugene, Oregon	4th	200 m	22.34
2013	USA Outdoor Track and Field Championships	Des Moines, Iowa	1st	200 m	21.80
2013	USA Outdoor Track and Field Championships	Des Moines, Iowa	21st	100 m	11.81
2014	USA Outdoor Track and Field Championships	Sacramento, California	2nd	200 m	22.10
2015	USA Outdoor Track and Field Championships	Eugene, Oregon	16th	100 m	11.43
2015	USA Outdoor Track and Field Championships	Eugene, Oregon	10th	200 m	22.83
2016	US Olympic Trials	Eugene, Oregon	21st	100 m	11.46
2016	US Olympic Trials	Eugene, Oregon	34th	200 m	23.75
2017	2017 USA Outdoor Track and Field Championships	Sacramento, California	9th	100 m	11.24
2017	2017 USA Outdoor Track and Field Championships	Sacramento, California	2nd	200 m	22.59
2018	2018 USA Outdoor Track and Field Championships	Des Moines, Iowa	6th	200 m	23.13

IAAF World championships

Year	Competition	Venue	Position	Event	Notes
2013	2013 World Championships	Moscow	12th	200 m	22.91
2017	2017 World Championships	London	6th	200 m	22.59

Awards
Preceded by Jessica Beard	The Bowerman (Women's Winner); 2012	Succeeded by Brianna Rollins
