= Maurice Mitchell =

American track and field sprinter (born 1989)

Personal information
- Born: December 22, 1989 (age 36) Kansas City, Missouri
- Spouse: Tiara Swanagan

Sport
- Sport: Running
- Event: Sprints
- College team: Florida State Seminoles

Achievements and titles
- Personal best(s): 100 m: 10.00 (Des Moines 2011); 200 m: 20.13 (Jacksonville 2012)
Medal record
Representing United States
Men's athletics
NACAC U-23 Championships
Gold medal – first place	2010 Miramar	4 × 100 meters
- Updated on 21 March 2022

Maurice Mitchell (born December 22, 1989) is an American track and field sprinter who specializes in the 200-meter dash. He has a personal record of 20.13 seconds in that event and has bests of 6.55 seconds for the 60-meter dash and 10 seconds for the 100-meter dash. He represented the United States in the relay at the 2011 World Championships and was selected to compete at the 2012 London Olympics.

While competing for Florida State University he won three NCAA Outdoor Championship titles, taking 200 m titles in 2011 and 2012 as well as a relay title in 2011. He also won 13 Atlantic Coast Conference titles and was chosen as the ACC Outdoor Performer of the Year three years running.

== Early life and college ==
Born in Kansas City, Missouri, Mitchell was a standout athlete while attending Raytown South High School and won eight state titles and broke the state records for the 100-meter dash and the 200-meter dash. He received an athletic scholarship to study social science at Florida State University and began competing collegiately for the Florida State Seminoles in 2009. In his first championship outing he came second over 200 m and third in the 60-meter dash at the Atlantic Coast Conference indoor meet (running a personal record of 6.60 seconds at the latter event). He came third at the ACC outdoor meet and ran a best of 20.64 seconds for the 200 m that season.

In his sophomore year at Florida State he began by winning the ACC 60 m title and repeating as 200 m runner-up. He gained his first All-America honours by reaching the 60 m final at the NCAA Indoor Championship. He won four titles at the ACC Outdoor Championship, taking the 100 m and 200 m individual titles as well as the 4 × 100-meter relay and 4 × 400-meter relay team titles. He ran a personal record of 20.24 seconds for the 200 m to win the NCAA East Regional qualifier. At the NCAA Outdoor Championship he was a semi-finalist in both the short sprints and helped the 4 × 100 m relay team to second in the final. Based on his performances, he was selected for the 2010 NACAC Under-23 Championships in Athletics in Miramar, Florida and he won the 100 m bronze medal with a personal best run of 10.14 seconds and won the relay for the United States, alongside Curtis Mitchell.

=== NCAA titles ===
Mitchell's third year at Florida State was highly successful. He won both the 60 m and 200 m ACC Indoor Championship races. At the 2010 NCAA Indoors he ran a school record time of 6.55 seconds in the 60 m heats before taking third in that event, then came close to the 200 m NCAA title – he had a personal record run of 20.41 seconds but was adjudged to have finished two thousandths of a second behind Mookie Salaam. Outdoor bests followed at the ACC Outdoor Championships, where a run of 10.03 brought him second in the 100 m and he defended his 200 m title with 20.19 seconds (he also defended the relay title). The NCAA Outdoor meet saw him run ten seconds flat for third in the 100 m and a windy 19.99 seconds to win his first 200 m outdoor NCAA title. He also teamed up with Ngonidzashe Makusha and Brandon Byram to win the 4 × 100 m relay title. In his first senior national event at the 2011 USA Outdoor Track and Field Championships, he was a semi-finalist in the 100 m and fourth in the 200 m final. These performances led to his selection for the American relay team for the 2011 World Championships in Athletics. He was the alternate for the qualifiers and although he helped the United States top the qualifying round, the team failed to finish without Mitchell in the final.

The fourth and final year of his collegiate eligibility he repeated as ACC Indoor champion in the 200 m, but was second over 60 m. He was less successful at the NCAA Indoors, taking third in the 200 m and sixth in the 60 m. He was again dominant at the ACC Outdoor Championship that year: he took a third straight 200 m title, was runner-up in the 100 m, won the 4 × 100 m relay title, and helped Florida's 4 × 400 m relay team to third place. A lifetime best of 20.13 seconds followed at the NCAA East Regional 200 m qualifiers. The 2012 NCAA Outdoors was the venue of his second straight 200 m title, and he also claimed third place in the 100 m and second in the short relay.

== 2012 Olympics ==
At the end of his collegiate season, he chose to compete at the 2012 United States Olympic Trials to try to make the Olympic team. He was a semi-finalist in the 100 m, but ran a wind-assisted 20.14 to claim runner-up behind Wallace Spearmon over 200 m, earning him the chance to compete at the 2012 London Olympics. At the 2012 Olympics, he reached the 200 m semifinals.

== Personal bests ==
- 60-meter dash: 6.55 seconds (2011)
- 100-meter dash: 10.00 seconds (2011)
- 200-meter dash: 20.13 seconds (2012)
- 200-meter dash (indoor): 20.41 seconds (2011)
