= 2012 United States Olympic trials (track and field) =

2012 United States Olympic track and field trials
- Dates: June 21–July 1
- Host city: Eugene, Oregon, U.S.
- Venue: Hayward Field
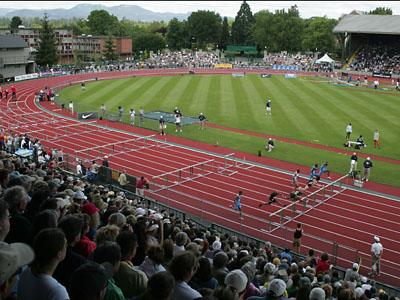
- Level: Senior
- Type: Outdoor
- Events: 40 (men: 20; women: 20)

The 2012 United States Olympic trials for track and field were held at Hayward Field in Eugene, Oregon. Organized by USA Track and Field, the ten-day competition lasted from June 21 until July 1 and served as the national championships in track and field for the United States.

The results of the event determined qualification for the American Olympic team at the 2012 Summer Olympics, to be held in London. Provided they had achieved the Olympic "A" standard, the top three athletes gained a place on the Olympic team. In the event that a leading athlete did not hold an "A" standard, or an athlete withdrew, the next highest finishing athlete with an "A" standard was selected instead.

The trials for the men's and women's marathon were held January 14 in Houston and the trials for the men's 50 km race walk were held January 22 in Santee, California. The hammer throw competitions were held at the Nike facility in Beaverton, Oregon.

== Men's results ==
Key: ≠ Athlete without "A" standard, not selected.

=== Men track events ===
Event	Gold		Silver		Bronze	
100 metres	Justin Gatlin	9.82	Tyson Gay	9.86	Ryan Bailey	9.93
200 metres (Wind: +2.3 m/s)	Wallace Spearmon	19.82w	Maurice Mitchell	20.14w	Isiah Young	20.16w
400 metres	LaShawn Merritt	44.12	Tony McQuay	44.49	Bryshon Nellum	44.80
800 metres	Nick Symmonds	1:43.92	Khadevis Robinson	1:44.64	Duane Solomon	1:44.65
1500 metres	Leonel Manzano	3:35.75	Matthew Centrowitz	3:35.84	Andrew Wheating	3:36.68
5000 metres	Galen Rupp	13:22.67	Bernard Lagat	13:22.82	Lopez Lomong	13:24.47
10,000 metres	Galen Rupp	27:25.33 CR	Matt Tegenkamp	27:33.94	Dathan Ritzenhein	27:36.09
110 metres hurdles	Aries Merritt	12.93	Jason Richardson	12.98	Jeff Porter	13.08
400 metres hurdles	Michael Tinsley	48.33	Angelo Taylor	48.57	Kerron Clement	48.89
3000 metres steeplechase	Evan Jager	8:17.40	Donald Cabral	8:19.81	Kyle Alcorn	8:22.17
20 km walk	Trevor Barron	1:23:00.10 NR, CR	Tim Seaman≠	1:27:29.48	Nick Christie≠	1:29:47.30

=== Men field events ===
Event	Gold		Silver		Bronze	
High jump^{[a]}	Jamie Nieto	2.28 m (7 ft 5 3/4 in)	Erik Kynard	2.28 m (7 ft 5 3/4 in)	Nick Ross≠	2.28 m (7 ft 5 3/4 in)
Pole vault^{[b]}	Brad Walker	5.67 m (18 ft 7 in)	Jeremy Scott	5.60 m (18 ft 4 1/4 in)	Scott Roth≠	5.60 m (18 ft 4 1/4 in)
Long jump	Marquise Goodwin	8.33 m (27 ft 3 3/4 in)	Will Claye	8.23 m (27 ft 0 in)	George Kitchens	8.21 m (26 ft 11 in)
Triple jump	Christian Taylor	17.63 m (57 ft 10 in)	Will Claye	17.55 m (57 ft 6 3/4 in)	Walter Davis≠	16.69 m (54 ft 9 in)
Shot put	Reese Hoffa	22.00 m (72 ft 2 in)	Ryan Whiting	21.66 m (71 ft 3/4 in)	Christian Cantwell	21.28 m (69 ft 9 3/4 in)
Discus throw^{[c]}	Lance Brooks	65.15 m (213 ft 8 in)	Jarred Rome	63.35 m (207 ft 10 in)	Jason Young	62.15 m (203 ft 10 in)
Hammer throw^{[d]}	Kibwe Johnson	74.97 m (245 ft 11 in)	Chris Cralle≠	74.36 m (243 ft 11 in)	A. G. Kruger	73.93 m (242 ft 6 in)
Javelin throw^{[e]}	Sam Humphreys≠	81.86 m (268 ft 6 in)	Sam Crouser≠	80.80 m (265 ft 1 in)	Craig Kinsley	79.92 m (262 ft 2 in)
Decathlon^{[f]}	Ashton Eaton	9039 WR, CR	Trey Hardee	8383	Gray Horn≠	7954

==== Notes ====
^{a} As a result of Nick Ross not having the "A" standard of 2.31 m, fourth-place finisher Jesse Williams was included on the Olympic team as he had an "A" standard.
^{b} As a result of Scott Roth not having the "A" standard of 5.72 m, fourth-place finisher Derek Miles was included on the Olympic team as he held an "A" standard.
^{c} Brooks was the only individual to throw over the "A" standard of 65.00 m in the competition. However, Rome and Young threw the "A" standard in earlier competitions.
^{d} Johnson and Kruger were selected for the Olympic team as both had achieved the "A" standard (78.00 m) from earlier competitions.
^{e} Kinsley was included on the Olympic team as he previously held the "A" standard of at least 82.00 m. In addition, fourth-place finisher Sean Furey (77.86 m) and fifth-place finisher Cyrus Hostetler (77.63 m) was included as they held the "A" standard beforehand.
^{f} Marks for Eaton were: 10.21 (+0.4 m/s) for 100 metres, 8.23 m (+0.8 m/s) for the long jump, 14.20 m for the shot put, 2.05 m for the high jump, 46.70 for 400 metres, 13.70 for the 110 metres hurdles, 42.81 m for the discus throw, 5.30 m for the pole vault, 58.87 m for the javelin throw, and 4:14.48 for the 1500 metres run. Eaton's performance in the 100 metres and long jump were decathlon bests. He placed first in seven of the ten events. He is now only the second decathlete (after Roman Šebrle) ever to break the 9,000-point barrier. Note Eaton's 8.23 m in the long jump would have tied for second in the men's long jump final.

== Women's results ==
Key: ≠ Athlete without "A" standard, not selected.

=== Women track events ===
Event	Gold		Silver		Bronze	
100 metres^{[g]}	Carmelita Jeter	10.92	Tianna Madison	10.96	Jeneba Tarmoh; Allyson Felix	11.07
200 metres	Allyson Felix	21.69 CR	Carmelita Jeter	22.11	Sanya Richards-Ross	22.22
400 metres	Sanya Richards-Ross	49.28	DeeDee Trotter	50.02	Francena McCorory	50.43
800 metres	Alysia Montaño	1:59.08	Geena Gall	1:59.24	Alice Schmidt	1:59.46
1500 metres	Morgan Uceny	4:04.59	Shannon Rowbury	4:05.11	Jennifer Simpson	4:05.17
5000 metres	Julie Culley	15:13.77	Molly Huddle	15:14.40	Kim Conley	15:19.79
10,000 metres^{[h]}	Amy Hastings	31:58.36	Natosha Rogers≠	31:59.21	Shalane Flanagan	31:59.69
100 metres hurdles	Dawn Harper	12.73	Kellie Wells	12.77	Lolo Jones	12.86
400 metres hurdles	Lashinda Demus	53.98	Georganne Moline	54.33	Ti'erra Brown	54.81
3000 metres steeplechase	Emma Coburn	9:32.78	Bridget Franek	9:35.62	Shalaya Kipp	9:35.73
20 km walk^{[i]}	Maria Michta	1:34:53.33	Miranda Melville≠	1:34:56.92	Erin Gray≠	1:35:40.05

=== Women field events ===
Event	Gold		Silver		Bronze	
High jump	Chaunte Lowe	2.01 m (6 ft 7 in)	Brigetta Barrett	2.01 m (6 ft 7 in)	Amy Acuff	1.95 m (6 ft 4 3/4 in) W35 AR
Pole vault	Jenn Suhr	4.60 m (15 ft 1 in)	Becky Holliday	4.55 m (14 ft 11 in)	Lacy Janson	4.50 m (14 ft 9 in)
Long jump	Brittney Reese	7.15 m (23 ft 5 1/4 in)	Chelsea Hayes	7.10 m (23 ft 3 1/2 in)	Janay DeLoach	7.08 m (23 ft 2 1/2 in)
Triple jump^{[j]}	Amanda Smock	13.94 m (45 ft 8 3/4 in)	Sheena Gordon≠	13.83 m (45 ft 4 1/4 in)	Andrea Geubelle≠	13.79 m (45 ft 2 3/4 in)
Shot put	Jillian Camarena-Williams	19.16 m (62 ft 10 1/4 in)	Michelle Carter	18.57 m (60 ft 11 in)	Tia Brooks	18.34 m (60 ft 2 in)
Discus throw^{[k]}	Stephanie Brown Trafton	65.18 m (213 ft 10 in)	Aretha Thurmond	62.23 m (204 ft 2 in)	Suzy Powell-Roos≠	60.20 m (197 ft 6 in)
Hammer throw	Amber Campbell	71.80 m (235 ft 6 in)	Amanda Bingson	71.78 m (235 ft 5 in)	Jessica Cosby	70.77 m (232 ft 2 in)
Javelin throw^{[l]}	Brittany Borman	61.51 m (201 ft 9 in)	Kara Patterson	59.79 m (196 ft 1 in)	Kimberley Hamilton≠	58.04 m (190 ft 5 in)
Heptathlon	Hyleas Fountain	6419 pts	Sharon Day	6343 pts	Chantae McMillan	6188 pts

==== Notes ====
^{g} Tarmoh was initially declared the winner for third. However, upon further review, officials announced it was indeed a dead heat between her and Felix. At the time of the race, there was no procedure for settling such a tie. After deliberation, USA Track & Field stated that either athlete will have the option of deferring the spot. In that case, the relinquisher will automatically be named an alternate and the other will have the spot. If neither athlete decides to defer, they will have the option of a coin toss or run-off to determine the winner. If the athletes cannot reach a consensus on which method to utilize, a run-off will take place. In the event that both athletes have no preference, a coin toss will occur. If one athlete has a preference and the other does not, the preference will occur. Included on the USATF leadership, inventing the procedure was USATF President Stephanie Hightower, herself the odd person out of perhaps the previous closest race decision in trials history; the 1984 women's 100 m hurdles. Ultimately, Tarmoh decided to defer, thus giving Felix the spot.
^{h} As a result of Rogers not having an "A" standard (31:45.00) and Flanagan opting to compete in the marathon instead (although she holds an "A" standard), fourth-place finisher Lisa Uhl (32:03.46) and seventh-place finisher Janet Cherobon-Bawcom (32:17.06) was included on the Olympic team as both were the only other runners in the race to have achieved the "A" standard from earlier competitions.
^{i} Michta was the only American representative in the 20 km walk as she held the "B" standard (1:38:00) previously.
^{j} Smock was the only American representative in the triple jump as she held the "B" standard (14.10 m) previously.
^{k} Sixth-place finisher Gia Lewis-Smallwood (58.78 m) was included on the Olympic team as she held an "A" standard (63.97 m, with the standard being 62.00 m) from May.
^{l} Fourth-place finisher Rachel Yurkovich (56.85 m) was included on the Olympic team as she held the "A" standard of at least 61.00 m.
