= 2004 London Marathon =

24th London Marathon

24th London Marathon
- Venue: London, United Kingdom
- Date: 18 April 2004

Champions
- Men: Evans Rutto (2:06:18)
- Women: Margaret Okayo (2:22:35)
- Wheelchair men: Saúl Mendoza (1:36:56)
- Wheelchair women: Francesca Porcellato (2:04:58)

The 2004 London Marathon was the 24th running of the annual marathon race in London, United Kingdom, which took place on Sunday 18 April. The race was the coldest London Marathon in history, and the wettest race in history until it was surpassed in 2020.

The elite men's race was won by Kenya's Evans Rutto in a time of 2:06:18 and the women's race was won in 2:22:35 by Margaret Okayo, also of Kenya. In the wheelchair races, Mexico's Saúl Mendoza (1:36:56) and Italy's Francesca Porcellato (2:04:58) won the men's and women's divisions, respectively. In the mass-participation race, a total of 31,659 runners, 23,265 men and 8,394 women, finished the race.

== Competitors ==
The men's race featured 2003 winner Gezahegne Abera and Evans Rutto, whose debut time at the 2003 Chicago Marathon was the fastest first race time by anyone, and was enough to win the event. Sammy Korir, who had recorded the second fastest marathon of all-time also competed, as did Moroccan world champion Jaouad Gharib. Paul Tergat, the world record holder in the men's marathon, did not compete due to an injury.

The women's race featured Margaret Okayo, who had won two New York City Marathons, and Sun Yingjie was a favourite for the race. Sun had set the third fastest time ever at the 2003 Beijing Marathon. Paula Radcliffe, who won the 2003 race did not compete; she had set the women's marathon world record at that event.

== Race summary ==
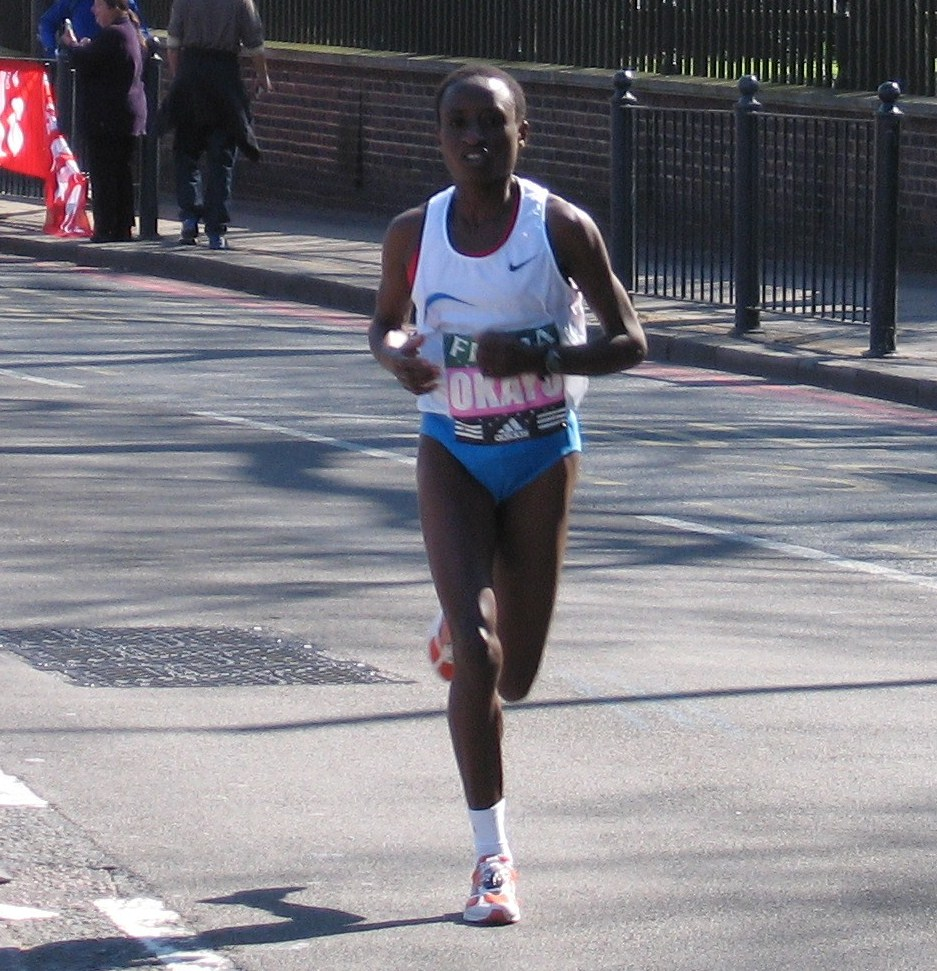
Margaret Okayo won the elite women's race.

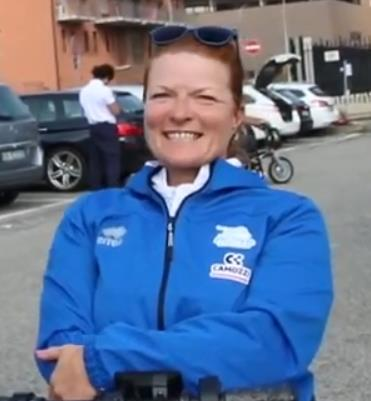
Francesca Porcellato won the women's wheelchair race

The elite and wheelchair races started in dry conditions, though the course became wet later on. It was the coldest London Marathon in history, as the temperature was 5.3 °C (41.5 °F) at the start of the races. There was 12.4 millimetres (0.49 in) of rain during the race, making it at the time the wettest London Marathon event in history; the 2020 London Marathon later surpassed the 2004 race for amount of rain, as it was run during Storm Alex.

The men's race was won by Kenyan Evans Rutto. Sammy Korir finished second and Jaouad Gharib finished third. Gezahegne Abera withdrew from the race after about 10 kilometres (6.2 mi). Rutto, Korir and John Yuda Msuri broke away from the pack around 25 kilometres (16 mi) into the race, and Yuda was distanced from the pair about 6 miles (9.7 km) from the finish line. During the race, Rutto fell on a cobblestone section near to the Tower of London and brought down Korir; the 2005 race was rerouted to avoid these cobblestones. At the time, Rutto's time of 2:06:18 was the best finishing time for a marathon that year. Rutto was not selected in the Kenyan team for the 2004 Summer Olympics, as Korir was chosen instead. Jon Brown was the highest place British finisher, and he finished faster than the Olympic qualifying time.

The women's race was won by Kenyan Margaret Okayo, ahead of Lyudmila Petrova in second, and Constantina Diță in third. It was the first time that Kenyan athletes had won both the men's and women's London Marathon events in the same year. Okayo fell behind the leading pack containing Diță after around 10 miles (16 km) of the race, but caught and passed the leaders around 20 miles (32 km) into the race. Diță was overtaken in the closing stages of the race. Tracey Morris was the highest finishing Briton in the race; as a result, she was selected for the British marathon team for the 2004 Summer Olympics, alongside Paula Radcliffe and Liz Yelling.

The men's wheelchair race was won by Mexican Saúl Mendoza, with David Weir finishing second. During the race, Mendoza accidentally followed a police motorbike which diverted him away from the course.

The women's wheelchair race was won by Italian Francesca Porcellato for the second successive year. Briton Paula Craig finished second, with Swedish debutant Gunilla Wallengren finishing third.

=== Non-elite race ===
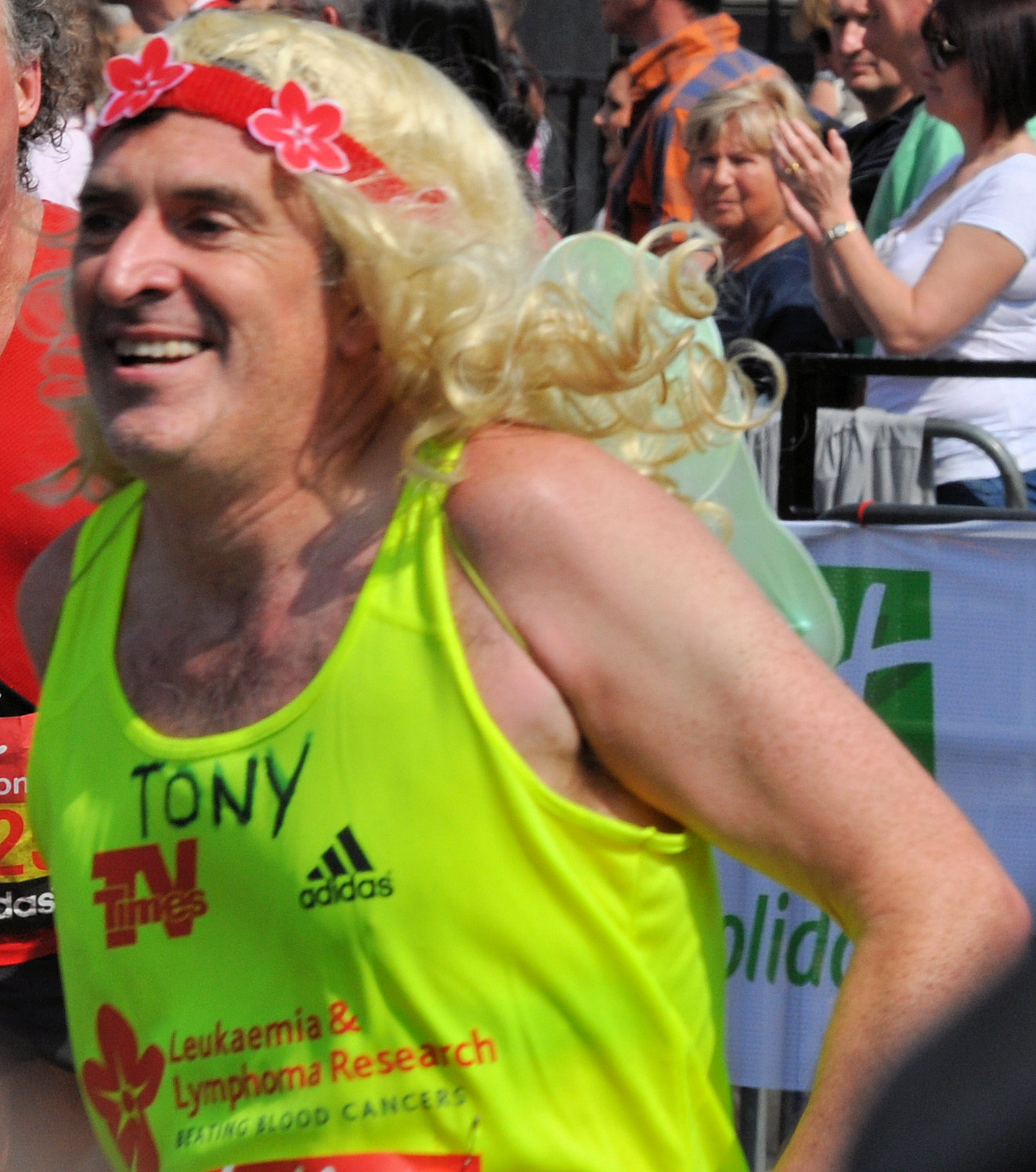
Tony Audenshaw, pictured here in 2011, was the first celebrity to finish.

The mass-participation event had three start points. The races from those locations were started by former runner Roger Bannister, rugby union player Jonny Wilkinson and then IAAF president Lamine Diack respectively. A total of 108,000 people applied to enter the race: 45,219 had their applications accepted and 32,746 started the race. A total of 31,659 runners, 23,265 men and 8,394 women, finished the race. Finishers included Fauja Singh, who was aged 93, and finished in a time of 6:07:13. Singh was the oldest finisher at any London Marathon.

Emmerdale star Tony Audenshaw was the first celebrity to finish, and other notable celebrity participants included chefs Gordon Ramsay and Michel Roux, as well as jockey Richard Dunwoody, former cricketer Graham Gooch, former swimmer Adrian Moorhouse, former England football manager Graham Taylor, former leader of the Conservative Party Iain Duncan Smith and politician Jeffrey Archer.

== Results ==
Note: Only the top 20 finishers are listed.

=== Men ===
Elite men's top 20 finishers
Position	Athlete	Nationality	Time
1st place, gold medalist(s)	Evans Rutto	Kenya	2:06:20
2nd place, silver medalist(s)	Sammy Korir	Kenya	2:06:48
3rd place, bronze medalist(s)	Jaouad Gharib	Morocco	2:07:12
4	Stefano Baldini	Italy	2:08:37
5	Tesfaye Tola	Ethiopia	2:09:07
6	Benoît Zwierzchiewski	France	2:09:35
7	Abdelkader El Mouaziz	Morocco	2:09:42
8	Lee Troop	Australia	2:09:42
9	John Yuda Msuri	Tanzania	2:10:13
10	Joseph Kadon	Kenya	2:11:30
11	Joseph Ngolepus	Kenya	2:12:02
12	William Kiplagat	Kenya	2:12:04
13	Sisay Bezabeh	Australia	2:12:05
14	Scott Westcott	Australia	2:13:30
15	Jon Brown	United Kingdom	2:13:39
16	Dan Robinson	United Kingdom	2:13:53
17	Nikolaos Polias	Greece	2:15:02
18	Chris Cariss	United Kingdom	2:15:08
19	Huw Lobb	United Kingdom	2:15:49
20	Mark Hudspith	United Kingdom	2:16:15

=== Women ===
Elite women's top 20 finishers
Position	Athlete	Nationality	Time
1st place, gold medalist(s)	Margaret Okayo	Kenya	2:22:35
2nd place, silver medalist(s)	Lyudmila Petrova	Russia	2:26:02
3rd place, bronze medalist(s)	Constantina Diță	Romania	2:26:52
4	Albina Mayorova	Russia	2:27:25
5	Joyce Chepchumba	Kenya	2:28:01
6	Svetlana Zakharova	Russia	2:28:10
7	Yingjie Sun	China	2:28:32
8	Alina Ivanova	Russia	2:28:48
9	Svetlana Demidenko	Russia	2:33:06
10	Tracey Morris	United Kingdom	2:33:52
11	Birhan Dagne	United Kingdom	2:34:45
12	Jackie Gallagher	Australia	2:34:48
13	Jo Lodge	United Kingdom	2:34:49
14	Michelle Lee	United Kingdom	2:35:51
15	Sue Harrison	United Kingdom	2:38:20
16	Michaela McCullum	United Kingdom	2:39:10
17	Mara Yamauchi	United Kingdom	2:39:15
18	Spyridoula Souma	Greece	2:40:34
19	Valerie Young	Ireland	2:41:32
20	Susan Partridge	United Kingdom	2:41:44

=== Wheelchair men ===
Wheelchair men's finishers
Position	Athlete	Nationality	Time
1st place, gold medalist(s)	Saúl Mendoza	Mexico	1:36:56
2nd place, silver medalist(s)	David Weir	United Kingdom	1:42:50
3rd place, bronze medalist(s)	Alain Fuss	France	1:45:25
4	Tushar Patel	United Kingdom	1:51:03
5	Jeff Adams	Canada	1:59:07
6	Jason Richards	United Kingdom	2:00:11
7	Andrew Cheek	United Kingdom	2:03:31
8	Daniel Kukla	Slovakia	2:05:02
9	Steve Williamson	United Kingdom	2:18:42
10	Geof Allen	United Kingdom	2:21:44

=== Wheelchair women ===
Wheelchair women's finishers
Position	Athlete	Nationality	Time
1st place, gold medalist(s)	Francesca Porcellato	Italy	2:04:58
2nd place, silver medalist(s)	Paula Craig	United Kingdom	2:07:52
3rd place, bronze medalist(s)	Gunilla Wallengren	Sweden	2:14:13
4	Michelle Lewis	United Kingdom	2:52:27
