= National records in the marathon =

The following tables are an overview of all current national records in the marathon, as compiled by World Athletics and other authoritative sources of road racing statistics.

== Background ==
World Athletics is the international governing body for the sport of athletics. As of 2023, the national governing bodies of 214 countries (Note: World Athletics defines "Country" as "a self-governing geographical area of the world recognized as an independent state by international law and international governmental bodies.") and territories (Note: World Athletics defines "Territory" as "a geographical area of the world which is not a Country, but which has certain aspects of self-government, at least to the extent of being autonomous in the control of its sport which is recognized as such by World Athletics.") are affiliated with World Athletics as National Member Federations. According to World Athletics, their lists of national records "mainly include official records as recognized by various national federations" and notes that in some cases "federations recognize invalid performances". The Boston Marathon is considered the site of several national records, yet this course is invalid for the world record because it is point-to-point with a greater than allowable elevation drop, which aids performance.

World Athletic's list includes Palestine, whose Palestine Athletic Federation is the national governing body of athletics affiliated to World Athletics. The United Kingdom of Great Britain and Northern Ireland is represented in World Athletics by UK Athletics, which in turn is affiliated with the athletic associations of England, Northern Ireland, Scotland, and Wales (collectively known as the Home Country Athletics Federations). Although World Athletics notes only the fastest performance under the UK umbrella, these associations each compile a list of national records in track and field. World Athletic's list includes some British overseas territories that compete under their own flags (e.g. Bermuda, British Virgin Islands, and Cayman Islands).

Other road racing sources slightly differ regarding which types of political states are included in their national records lists. For example, Athletics Weekly's list includes countries of England, Scotland, Wales, and Northern Ireland, as well as the Crown Dependencies of Guernsey, the Isle of Man, and Jersey which are technically not part of the United Kingdom. The Association of Road Racing Statisticians' list includes all of the above plus the British overseas territory of Saint Helena. Similar list variations occur with other political states or territories affiliated with Denmark, France, and New Zealand.

Another important reference source is the 2018 edition of NATIONAL ATHLETICS RECORDS (NAR) for all countries in the world by Winfried Kramer with the assistance of Heinrich Hubbeling, Yves Pinaud and Steffan Stube.

Several national records were run on a date when an athlete represented a country currently no longer in existence such as the Union of Soviet Socialist Republics, Czechoslovakia and Yugoslavia. On achieving independence the appropriate national federation of the current national state retroactively recognized them as valid NRs.

== Marathon records by region ==
The following table contains marathon records within each world region.

=== Men ===
Region	Country/territory	Time	Athlete	Date	Place
Africa	Kenya	1:59:30	Sabastian Sawe	26 Apr 2026	London
Asia	Bahrain	2:04:43	El Hassan El-Abbassi	2 Dec 2018	Valencia
Europe	Belgium	2:03:35	Bashir Abdi	24 Oct 2021	Rotterdam
North/Central America	United States	2:04:43	Conner Mantz	12 Oct 2025	Chicago
Oceania	Australia	2:06:20	Haftu Strintzos	5 Jul 2026	Gold Coast
South America	Brazil	2:04:51	Daniel Nascimento	17 Apr 2022	Seoul

=== Women ===
Region	Country/territory	Time	Athlete	Date	Place
Africa	Kenya	2:09:56	Ruth Chepng'etich	13 Oct 2024	Chicago
Asia	Japan	2:18:59	Honami Maeda	28 Jan 2024	Osaka
Europe	Netherlands	2:13:44	Sifan Hassan	8 Oct 2023	Chicago
North/Central America	United States	2:18:29	Emily Sisson	9 Oct 2022	Chicago
Oceania	Australia	2:21:24	Jessica Stenson	7 Dec 2025	Valencia
South America	Argentina	2:24:18	Florencia Borelli	18 Feb 2024	Seville

== Men's national records ==
Key:
Performances listed as national records by World Athletics.
Additional performances listed as national records by other road racing authorities.

Country/territory	Time	Athlete	Date	Place	Ref.
Afghanistan	2:28:46	Waheed Karim	2 Dec 1990	Sacramento	
Albania	2:25:29	Remzi Laho	29 Sep 1991	Burgas	
Algeria	2:09:54	Rachid Ziar	7 Apr 2002	Paris	
American Samoa	2:25:35	Gary Fanelli	2 Oct 1988	Seoul	(Note: Per IAAF: "Competing as a US citizen, Fanelli’s best is 2:14:17 at Montréal, 06 Sep 80".)
Andorra	2:14:25	Antoni Bernadó	16 Mar 2003	Barcelona	
Angola	2:11:40	João n'Tyamba	30 Sep 2001	Berlin	
Antigua and Barbuda	2:31:49	Cordover Simon	28 Aug 1994	Victoria	
Argentina	2:09:36	Joaquín Arbe	5 Dec 2021	Valencia	
Armenia	2:20:36	Ashik Mkhitarian	4 Apr 1968	Uzhhorod	
Aruba	2:13:43	Kim Reynierse	10 Sep 1989	Berchem	
Australia	2:06:20	Haftu Strintzos	5 Jul 2026	Gold Coast	
Austria	2:09:53	Aaron Gruen	30 Mar 2025	Congers, NY	
Azerbaijan	2:11:22	Tilahun Aliyev	25 Jan 2013	Dubai	
Bahamas	2:29:28	O'Neil Williams	20 Oct 2019	Amsterdam	
Bahrain	2:04:43	El Hassan El-Abbassi	2 Dec 2018	Valencia	
Bangladesh	2:22:03	Ali Mohamed	7 Mar 1987	Dhaka	
Barbados	2:29:40	Reuben McColin	4 Dec 1988	Bridgetown	
Belarus	2:10:58	Vladimir Kotov	24 May 1980	Moscow	
Belgium	2:03:36	Bashir Abdi	24 Oct 2021	Rotterdam	
Belize	2:22:01	Patrick Fuller	8 Feb 2003	Birmingham, AL	
Benin	2:24:53	Patrice Lompo	11 Feb 2012	Parakou	
Bermuda	2:21:47; 2:19:55 dh	Tyler Butterfield; Chris Estwanik	10 Mar 2019; 15 Apr 2013	Ōtsu; Boston	
Bhutan	2:36:58	Gawa Zangpo	7 Mar 2020	Punakha	
Bolivia	2:07:44	Héctor Garibay	19 Feb 2023	Seville	
Bosnia and Herzegovina	2:15:55	Sead Kondo	3 May 1975	Karl-Marx-Stadt	
Botswana	2:14:57	John James	25 Jul 2004	Selebi-Phikwe	(Note: Per WMM: "Possible irregularities at Phikwe 2004. Alternate record 2:17:04, Tiapo Maso, 5 March 2000 Cape Town". Per ARRS: "2:17:04 Tiapo Maso 5 Mar 2000 Cape Town RSA")
Brazil	2:04:51	Daniel Nascimento	17 Apr 2022	Seoul	
British Virgin Islands	2:36:54	Rasalula Nagarit	11 Oct 2008	Baltimore	
Brunei	2:41:12	Sifli Anak Ahar	14 Oct 2008	Kota Kinabalu	(Note: Per ARRS: "2:53:57 Mapang Hidup 15 Dec 1985 Bangkok THA")
Bulgaria	2:11:26	Christo Stefanov	19 Oct 1997	Sofia	
Burkina Faso	2:27:20	Moctaré Simporé	25 Sep 2022	Berlin	
Burundi	2:07:13	Olivier Irabaruta	10 Apr 2022	Zurich	
Cambodia	2:23:29	Hem Bunting	15 Apr 2012	Paris	
Cameroon	2:15:43	Justilin Foimi	27 Oct 2019	Douala	
Canada	2:05:36	Cameron Levins	5 Mar 2023	Tokyo	
Cape Verde	2:11:01	Samuel Freire	18 Feb 2024	Seville	
Cayman Islands	2:34:29	Jon Rankin	5 Dec 2010	Sacramento	
Central African Republic	2:18:06	Ernest Ndjissipou	30 Aug 2003	Paris	
Chad	2:18:20	Valentin Betoudji	3 Dec 2023	Valencia	
Chile	2:08:04	Carlos Díaz	18 Feb 2024	Seville	
China	2:05:58	Feng Peiyou	1 Mar 2026	Tokyo	
Colombia	2:10:51	Jeison Suárez	18 Apr 2021	Enschede	
Comoros	2:35:43	Youssouf Gagou	18 Sep 1998	Saint-Paul, Réunion	
Congo DR	2:08:40	Mwenzé Kalombo	4 Apr 1999	Paris	
Congo Republic	2:26:01	Bernard Tsati	16 Sep 1990	Puteaux	
Cook Islands	2:51:26	Muriaroa Ngaro	3 May 1980	Avarua	
Costa Rica	2:13:23	José Luis Molina	3 Mar 1996	Los Angeles	
Croatia	2:17:05	Drago Paripović	29 Mar 1992	Bologna	
Cuba	2:10:53	Ignacio Alberto Cuba	13 Dec 1992	Mérida	(Note: Per WMM: "Federation record, although maybe short. Alternate record 2:13:08, Radames Gonzalez, 11 Dec 1998, Calvia". Per ARRS: "2:13:08 Radames Gonzalez 11 Dec 1988 Calvia ESP")
Curaçao	2:55:50	Herman Couperus	6 Nov 2016	New York City	
Cyprus	2:10:20	Amine Khadiri	19 Feb 2023	Seville	
Czech Republic	2:11:12	Karel David	10 Feb 1991	Tokyo	
Denmark	2:07:51	Jacob Simonsen	29 Sep 2024	Berlin	
Djibouti	2:05:20	Ibrahim Hassan	22 Feb 2026	Osaka	
Dominica	3:13:32	Calvin Auguiste	3 Nov 2013	New York City	
Dominican Republic	2:14:30	Alvaro Abreu	15 Jan 2023	Houston	
Ecuador	2:09:05	Segundo Jami	3 Dec 2023	Valencia	
Egypt	2:19:39	Aissa Rezah Abou Diaf	25 Dec 1997	Arish	
El Salvador	2:26:57	Víctor Vásquez	13 Jan 1990	Tegucigalpa	
England	2:05:11	Mo Farah	7 Oct 2018	Chicago	
Equatorial Guinea	2:21:22	Benjamín Enzema	12 May 2019	Saumur	
Eritrea	2:04:35	Kizkel Tewelde	17 Oct 2021	Amsterdam	
Estonia	2:08:53	Pavel Loskutov	7 Apr 2002	Paris	
Eswatini	2:12:54	Richard Mabuza	31 Jan 1974	Christchurch	(Note: Per ARRS: "2:12:54.4")
Ethiopia	1:59:41	Yomif Kejelcha	26 Apr 2026	London	
Falkland Islands	2:43:31	Hugh Marsden	28 Aug 1994	Victoria	
Faroe Islands	2:21:30	Julian Gregersenn	7 Dec 2025	Valencia	
Fiji	2:23:33 dh	Binesh Prasad	5 Feb 1989	Las Vegas	
Finland	2:10:46	Janne Holmén	13 Apr 2008	Rotterdam	
France	2:03:47	Morhad Amdouni	18 Feb 2024	Seville	
French Polynesia	2:24:57	Damien Troquenet	1 Dec 2024	Valencia	
Gabon	2:31:59	Jean-Marc Léandro	9 Nov 2008	Nice-Cannes	
Gambia	2:18:42	Ousman Jaiteh	8 Dec 2019	Reggio Emilia	
Georgia	2:11:46	Daviti Kharazishvili	3 Dec 2023	Valencia	
Germany	2:04:03	Amanal Petros	7 Dec 2025	Valencia	
Ghana	2:18:43	Emanuel Amoo	11 Nov 1990	Lagos	
Gibraltar	2:28:08	Arnold Rogers	20 Feb 2022	Seville	
Greece	2:12:04	Spyros Andriopoulos	9 Oct 1988	Berlin	
Greenland	2:24:53	Janus Eigaard	21 May 2000	Copenhagen	
Grenada	2:46:50	Findlay O'Neal	4 Jun 1995	Port of Spain	
Guadeloupe	2:16:57	Jean Marie Dorvilma	7 Oct 1990	Nice	
Guam	2:31:04; 2:29.48 dh	Wayne Blas	14 Dec 2019; 18 Apr 2022	Huntsville; Boston	
Guatemala	2:07:40	Alberto Gonzalez Mindez	3 Dec 2023	Valencia	
Guernsey	2:13:41	Lee Merrien	22 Apr 2012	London	
Guinea	2:16:49	Alhassane Bangoura	25 Feb 2018	Seville	
Guinea-Bissau	2:29:04	Joaquim Moreira da Silva	8 Nov 1987	Lisbon	
Guyana	2:25:02	Andrew Smith	29 May 2004	Louisville	
Haiti	2:14:22	Dieudonné Lamothe	16 Apr 1988	Gagny	
Honduras	2:17:49	Clovis Morales	24 Apr 1977	Porz	
Hong Kong	2:15:26	Wong Wan Chun	15 Dec 2024	Fuzhou	
Hungary	2:10:43	Levente Szemerei	29 Sep 2024	Warsaw	
Iceland	2:13:37	Hlynur Andrésson	21 Mar 2021	Dresden	
India	2:11:37	Sawan Barwal	26 Sep 2026	Aichi-Nagoya	
Indonesia	2:12:20	Robi Syianturi	10 May 2026	Copenhagen	
Iran	2:17:14	Mohammad Jafar Moradi	24 Sep 2023	Berlin	
Iraq	2:21:54	Sadoun Nasser Hafi	5 Feb 1982	Baghdad	
Ireland	2:06:08	Peter Lynch	26 Apr 2026	London	
Isle of Man	2:23:34	Dave Cowell	31 Jan 1974	Christchurch	
Israel	2:04:44	Maru Teferi	1 Dec 2024	Valencia	
Italy	2:05:24	Yohanes Chiappinelli	1 Dec 2024	Valencia	
Ivory Coast	2:19:21	Jonathan Atse Herrera	3 Dec 2023	Valencia	(Note: Per IAAF: "2:18:32 Bassirima Soro, Tucson, 3 Dec 00 – downhill (drop of 654m)". Per WMM: On course with 580m drop, 2:18:32, Bassirima Soro, 3 December 2000, Tucson)
Jamaica	2:16:39	Derick Adamson	25 Nov 1984	Philadelphia	
Japan	2:04:55	Suguru Osako	7 Dec 2025	Valencia	
Jersey	2:22:36	William Tweed	23 Apr 1989	London	
Jordan	2:17:24	Methkal Abu Drais	25 Jan 2015	Marrakesh	
Kazakhstan	2:11:59	Nikolay Penzin	3 Sep 1978	Prague	
Kenya	1:59:30	Sebastian Sawe	26 Apr 2026	London	
Kosovo	2:29:36 dh	Rexhep Ajvazaj	9 Feb 1997	Las Vegas	
Kuwait	2:21:15	Abdul Mohsen Al-Ali	26 Sep 2021	Moline, Illinois	
Kyrgyzstan	2:11:16	Satymkul Dzhumanazarov	24 May 1980	Moscow	
Laos	2:43:45	Sysavath Thammavongchit	24 Feb 2013	Vientiane	
Latvia	2:14:24	Valērijs Žolnerovičs	14 May 2017	Riga	
Lebanon	2:19:46	Tony Hanna	19 Oct 2025	Amsterdam	
Lesotho	2:06:18	Tebello Ramakongoana	5 Jan 2025	Xiamen	
Liberia	3:00:16	Raymond Dovenon	25 Aug 2013	Monrovia	
Libya	2:13:33	Ali Zayed Mabrouk	23 Nov 2008	Milan	
Liechtenstein	2:23:55	Marcel Tschopp	9 Oct 2011	Chicago	
Lithuania	2:12:35	Česlovas Kundrotas	26 Oct 1997	Frankfurt	
Luxembourg	2:14:03	Justin Gloden	19 May 1985	Frankfurt	
Macau	2:28:22	Lam Weng Hei	5 Jun 1994	Melbourne	
Madagascar	2:17:14	Jules Randrianarivelo	29 Jul 1979	Moscow	
Malawi	2:16:04	Mphatso Nadolo	4 Dec 2021	Gqeberha	
Malaysia	2:22:34	Tan Huong Leong	20 Dec 2020	Fukuoka	
Maldives	2:32:56	Mohamed Shifaz	25 Jan 2019	Dubai	
Mali	2:28:59	Yacouba Guindo	1 Dec 2024	Valencia	
Malta	2:13:13	Jordan Gusman	8 Oct 2023	Valencia	
Martinique	2:27:03	Claude Nohile	30 Jan 2000	Port of Spain	
Mauritania	2:43:10	Majid Touré	13 Apr 2008	Rotterdam	(Note: Per ARRS: "2:53:04 Majid Toure 15 Apr 2007 Paris FRA")
Mauritius	2:18:20	David Carver	17 Apr 2016	Hamburg	
Mexico	2:07:19 dh	Andrés Espinosa	18 Apr 1994	Boston	(Note: Per WMM: "Strong tailwind at Boston 1994. Alternate record 2:08:30, Dionicio Ceron, 2 April 1995, London". Per ARRS: "2:08:30 Dionicio Ceron 2 Apr 1995 London ENG")
Micronesia	2:43:45 dh 2:52:29	Simeon Jacob; Elías Rodríguez	18 Apr 2022; 14 Jul 1990	Boston; San Antonio	
Moldova	2:08:32	Jaroslav Mushinschi	2 May 2010	Düsseldorf	
Monaco	2:27:11	Nicolas D’Angelo	13 Apr 2025	Brussels-Leuven	
Mongolia	2:08:50	Ser-Od Bat-Ochir	7 Dec 2014	Fukuoka	
Montenegro	2:24:18	Drago Musić	4 Oct 1998	Podgorica	
Morocco	2:04:24	Othmane El Goumri	26 Apr 2026	Hamburg	
Mozambique	2:16:42	Folavio Sehohle	8 May 2022	Durban	
Myanmar	2:19:57	Khin Soe	17 Dec 1978	Bangkok	
Namibia	2:08:40	Daniel Nghidinwa Paulus	2 Apr 2023	Daegu	
Nauru	3:48:06	Karl Hartmann	1968	Nauru	
Nepal	2:15:03	Baikuntha Manandhar	10 May 1987	Kolkata	(Note: Per ARRS: "2:19:38 Tika Banadur 24 Dec 1995 Madras")
Netherlands	2:04:20	Abdi Nageeye	27 Apr 2025	London	
Netherlands Antilles	2:57:28	Herman Couperus	17 Mar 2007	Curaçao	(Note: Per IAAF: "Herman Couperus opted for AHO in 2007".)
New Caledonia	2:11:59	Alain Lazare	12 Feb 1984	Tokyo	
New Zealand	2:08:19	Zane Robertson	7 Jul 2019	Gold Coast	
Nicaragua	2:20:39	William Aguirre	13 Jan 1990	Tegucigalpa	
Niger	2:25:05	Abdou Manzo	2 Oct 1988	Seoul	
Nigeria	2:16:06	Mohamed Abbas	11 Nov 1990	Lagos	
Niue	3:30:00	Simpson Ikimau	19 Oct 1982	Paliati	
Norfolk Island	3:30:20	James Donaldson	28 Jul 2002	Manchester	
Northern Ireland	2:09:49	Stephen Scullion	4 Oct 2020	London	
Northern Mariana Islands	2:44:44 dh 2:55:31	Eli Torgeson; Yong Choi	17 Apr 2006; 14 Jul 1990	Boston; San Antonio	
North Korea	2:09:42; 2:09:26	Il Ryong Han; Li Jong Hyong	24 Mar 2024; 19 Oct 1983	Wuxi; Pyongyang	(Note: Per IAAF: "Rumors in Europe say that the record given above by the Federation was achieved on a short course.)
North Macedonia	2:08:26	Dario Ivanovski	18 Feb 2024	Seville	
Norway	2:04:24	Awet Nftalem Kibrab	7 Dec 2025	Valencia	
Oman	2:43:27	Khalid Al-Farsi	19 Oct 2025	Amsterdam	(Note: Gun time. Chip time was 2:42:07.) (Note: Gun time. Chip time was 2:42:07.)
Pakistan	2:14:11	Naseer Ahmed	19 Oct 2003	Rawalpindi	(Note: Per ARRS: "2:25:29 Naseer Ahmad 8 Feb 2005 Hong Kong HKG")
Palau	3:36:07	Brook Kinz	2 Apr 2011	Koror	
Palestine	2:29:28	Ihab Salama	16 Apr 2000	Rotterdam	
Panama	2:09:24	Jorge Castelblanco	18 Feb 2024	Seville	
Papua New Guinea	2:28:13	Tau John Tokwepota	7 Dec 1980	Honolulu	
Paraguay	2:10:11	Derlis Ayala	6 Dec 2020	Valencia	
Peru	2:07:38	Cristhian Pacheco	19 Feb 2023	Seville	
Philippines	2:14:37	Sonny Wagdos	1 Mar 2026	Tokyo	
Poland	2:07:39	Henryk Szost	4 Mar 2012	Ōtsu	
Portugal	2:06:36	António Pinto	16 Apr 2000	London	
Puerto Rico	2:12:43	Jorge González	28 Aug 1983	Caracas	
Qatar	2:07:19	Essa Ismail Rashed	20 Oct 2019	Amsterdam	
Réunion	2:19:17	Jean-Jacques Prianon	1 May 1977	Nogent sur Marne	
Romania	2:11:58	Nicolae Soare	12 Oct 2025	Bucharest	
Russia	2:09:07	Aleksey Sokolov	29 Oct 2007	Dublin	
Rwanda	2:06:04	John Hakizimana	1 Feb 2026	Dubai	
Saint Helena	3:11:21	Erroll Duncan	19 Mar 2006	Melbourne	
Saint Kitts and Nevis	2:38:56	Jesse Mulcaire	5 Nov 1989	New York City	
Saint Lucia	2:16:06	Joseph Zepherinus	5 Oct 2003	Minneapolis–Saint Paul	
Saint Vincent and the Grenadines	2:15:30	Pamenos Ballantyne	26 Jan 2003	Port of Spain	(Note: Per ARRS: "2:16:25 Pamenos Ballantyne 26 Apr 1998 London ENG")
Samoa	2:41:50	Amani Tapusoa	22 Mar 1969	Apia	
San Marino	2:21:19	Gian Luigi Macina	27 Oct 1991	Carpi	
São Tomé and Príncipe	2:38:32	Mário Pitra	29 Jun 1980	Brazzaville	
Saudi Arabia	2:16:58	Ali Saeed Al Shahrani	27 Sep 2026	Berlin	
Scotland	2:08:14	Callum Hawkins	28 Apr 2019	London	
Senegal	2:25:01	Samba Faye	14 Feb 2016	Dakar	
Serbia	2:13:57	Borislav Dević	15 Jan 1995	Houston	(Note: Per IAAF: "2:12:40 Sreten Ninkovic Austin 17 Feb 02 – downhill". Per WMM:On course with 137m drop, 2:12:40, Sreten Ninkovic, 17 February 2002, Austin".)
Seychelles	2:25:48	Albert Marie	23 Oct 1988	Victoria, Seychelles	
Sierra Leone	2:33:38	Idrissa Kargbo	13 Apr 2014	London	
Singapore	2:23:00	Soh Rui Yong	5 Dec 2021	Valencia	
Slovakia	2:09:53	Róbert Štefko	26 Apr 1998	London	(Note: Per ARRS: "2:09:54")
Slovenia	2:11:50	Roman Kejžar	26 Mar 2000	Turin	
Solomon Islands	2:36:16	Mackay Talasasa	8 Oct 1982	Brisbane	
Somalia	2:09:09	Khadar Basheer Youssuf	16 Oct 2022	Amsterdam	
South Africa	2:05:36	Elroy Gelant	27 Apr 2025	Hamburg	
South Korea	2:07:20	Lee Bong-Ju	13 Feb 2000	Tokyo	
South Sudan	2:14:32	Guor Marial	2 Oct 2011	Minneapolis–Saint Paul	
Spain	2:05:48	Tariku Novales	3 Dec 2023	Valencia	
Sri Lanka	2:13:47	Anuradha Cooray	26 Apr 2015	London	
Sudan	2:11:41	Yaseen Abdalla	10 Aug 2024	Paris	
Suriname	2:31:48	Janiek Pomba	10 Apr 2022	Rotterdam	
Sweden	2:05:57	Suldan Hassan	2 Mar 2025	Tokyo	
Switzerland	2:04:40	Tadesse Abraham	1 Dec 2024	Valencia	
Syria	2:26:27	Ahmed Saker	6 Dec 1985	Latakia	
Taiwan	2:14:35	Gi-sheng Hsu	5 Feb 1995	Beppu-Ōita	
Tajikistan	2:18:40	Anatoliy Belogurov	20 Jun 1980	Moscow	(Note: Per ARRS: "2:18:18 Sergey Davidov 5 Aug 1995 Omsk RUS")
Tanzania	2:03:00	Gabriel Geay	4 Dec 2022	Valencia	
Thailand	2:08:01	Kieran Tuntivate	11 Oct 2026	Chicago	
Timor-Leste	2:26:46	Romênio de Deus Maia	19 Aug 2017	Dili	
Togo	2:30:17	Outcha Améwouho	11 Nov 1990	Lomé	
Tonga	2:45:04	Tongia Vakaafi	2 Mar 2013	Phoenix	
Trinidad and Tobago	2:13:03	Ronnie Holassie	29 Apr 2001	Cleveland	
Tunisia	2:12:36	Tahar Manjouri	14 Jan 1996	Marrakesh	
Turkey	2:04:16	Kaan Kigen Özbilen	1 Dec 2019	Valencia	
Turkmenistan	2:15:53	Rashid Kakadshanov	5 Oct 1980	Uzhhorod	
Turks and Caicos Islands	3:47:57	Todd Foss	10 Oct 2004	Chicago	
Uganda	2:00:28	Jacob Kiplimo	26 Apr 2026	London	
Ukraine	2:07:15	Dmytro Baranovskyi	3 Dec 2006	Fukuoka	
United Arab Emirates	2:23:42	Jassim Abbas Ali	11 Jan 2002	Dubai	
United Kingdom	2:05:11	Mo Farah	7 Oct 2018	Chicago	
United States	2:04:43	Conner Mantz	12 Oct 2025	Chicago	
U.S. Virgin Islands	2:17:09	Eduardo Garcia	14 Oct 2023	Valley Cottage	
Uruguay	2:09:04	Andrés Zamora	1 Dec 2024	Valencia	
Uzbekistan	2:07:02	Shokhrukh Davlatov	3 Dec 2023	Valencia	
Venezuela	2:11:25	Carlos Tarazona	30 Apr 2000	Cleveland	
Vietnam	2:18:42	Hoàng Nguyên Thanh	21 Jan 2024	Hong Kong	
Wales	2:07:13	Steve Jones	20 Oct 1985	Chicago	
Yemen	2:40:41	Mohamed Al-Saadi	4 Aug 1996	Atlanta	
Zambia	2:11:35	Jordan Chipangama	20 Jun 2015	Duluth	
Zimbabwe	2:06:48	Isaac Mpofu	4 Dec 2022	Valencia	

== Women's national records ==
Country/territory	Time	Athlete	Date	Place	Ref.
Afghanistan	3:24:07	Sahar Zamir	15 Sep 2007	Bismarck	
Albania	2:35:34	Luiza Gega	4 Oct 2020	Skopje	
Algeria	2:25:08	Souad Aït Salem	18 Mar 2007	Rome	
American Samoa	3:57:15	Faye Ondelacy	19 Jun 1999	Anchorage	
Andorra	3:09:49	Dulce Casanova	19 Nov 2017	Valencia	
Angola	3:48:29	Cristina Saraiva	2 Nov 2014	Porto	
Antigua and Barbuda	3:17:42	Sheryl Hastings	7 Nov 1999	New York City	
Argentina	2:24:18	Florencia Borelli	18 Feb 2024	Seville	
Armenia	2:40:40	Nina Usubyan	13 Apr 2025	Brussels-Leuven	
Aruba	2:53:24	Cornelia Melis	23 Sep 1988	Seoul	
Australia	2:21:24	Jessica Stenson	7 Dec 2025	Valencia	
Austria	2:26:08	Julia Mayer	7 Dec 2025	Valencia	
Azerbaijan	2:42:32; 2:42:24	Anna Yusupova; Behafeta Hadiyes	7 Jan 2024; 22 Apr 2018	Dubai; Agadir	(Note: At World Athletics, Yusupova's 2024 time of 2:42:32 is indicated as an Azerbaijani national record, while Hadiyes is acknowledged as a female Azerbaijani athlete with an unchallenged personal best time of 2:42:24.)
Bahamas	2:54:37	Giselle Pyfrom	16 Dec 1995	Jacksonville	
Bahrain	2:20:02	Eunice Chumba	17 Apr 2022	Seoul	
Bangladesh	3:39:50	Papiya Khatun	10 Jan 2022	Dhaka	
Barbados	3:06:07	Caroline Moorat	7 Jun 1987	Port of Spain	
Belarus	2:23:52	Volha Mazuronak	22 Jun 2024	Duluth	
Belgium	2:20:38	Chloé Herbiet	7 Dec 2025	Valencia	
Belize	3:05:13	Melissa Henderson	15 Jan 2007	Houston	
Benin	2:49:19	Bentille Alassane	9 Feb 2019	Parakou	
Bermuda	2:54:18	Deborah Butterfield	14 Jan 1990	Hamilton	
Bhutan	3:07:39	Deki Yangzom	7 Nov 2021	New York City	
Bolivia	2:32:37	Jhoselyn Camargo	15 Oct 2023	Amsterdam	
Bosnia and Herzegovina	2:34:57	Lucia Kimani	9 Oct 2011	Zagreb	
Botswana	2:51:32	Onkemetse Solotate	10 Feb 2008	Durban	(Note: At worldathletics.org the Namibian athlete Leena Ekandjo is accidentally given the Botswana national record with the time of 2:41:32 she ran in 2013 in Gabarone, Botswana. The 2022 World Athletics Handbook does not contain that error.)
Brazil	2:29:17; 2:27:41 dh	Adriana Aparecida da Silva; Carmen Souza de Oliveira	26 Feb 2012; 18 Apr 1994	Tokyo; Boston	
British Virgin Islands	4:24:44	Anna Kinkead	11 Jan 2016	Orlando, Florida	
Brunei	3:56:11	Jacqueline Teo Cheng Nee	7 Dec 2008	Singapore	
Bulgaria	2:29:23	Militsa Mircheva	15 May 2022	Copenhagen	
Burkina Faso	4:00:37	Nicole Badolo	29 May 2010	Ouagadougou	
Burundi	2:27:50	Diane Nukuri-Johnson	26 Apr 2015	London	
Cambodia	2:59:42	Nary Ly	15 Nov 2015	Valencia	
Cameroon	2:56:11	Sabine Otomo Mendouga	31 Oct 2021	Douala	
Canada	2:23:12	Natasha Wodak	25 Sep 2022	Berlin	
Cape Verde	2:58:00	Sónia Lopes	27 Apr 2003	Padua	
Cayman Islands	2:37:41	Michelle Bush	8 Dec 1991	Sacramento	
Central African Republic	3:28:41	Virginie Gloum	11 Jun 1994	Bondoufle	
Chad	2:46:41	Bibiro Ali Taher	7 Dec 2025	Valencia	
Chile	2:32:23	Érika Olivera	18 Apr 1999	Rotterdam	
China	2:19:39	Sun Yingjie	19 Oct 2003	Beijing	
Colombia	2:25:35	Angie Orjuela	24 Sep 2023	Berlin	
Comoros	3:30:00	Frahaty Ali M'Sa	3 Jun 2012	Moroni, Comoros	
Congo DR	3:11:14	Ritha Tumaini Nzabava	16 Jun 2019	Kigali	
Congo Republic	2:42:37	Clème Prudence Mambéké	31 Oct 2021	Douala	
Cook Islands	3:32:33	Kiki Atonia	3 May 1980	Avarua	
Costa Rica	2:32:08	Diana Bogantes	3 Dec 2023	Valencia	
Croatia	2:23:39	Bojana Bjeljac	4 Dec 2022	Valencia	
Cuba	2:36:35	Emperatriz Wilson	13 Dec 1992	Caracas	
Curaçao	2:50:29	Marlies Kort	29 Jan 2012	Miami	
Cyprus	2:34:17	Dagmara Handzlik	7 Jul 2019	Gold Coast	
Czech Republic	2:23:44	Moira Stewartová	1 Dec 2024	Valencia	
Denmark	2:29:34	Dorthe Rasmussen	23 Apr 1989	London	
Dominica	4:14:59	Janelle Prevost	12 Apr 2015	Paris	
Dominican Republic	2:43:26	Soranyi Rodriguez	24 Nov 2019	Santiago de los Caballeros	
Ecuador	2:24:50	Silvia Ortiz	3 Dec 2023	Valencia	
Egypt	3:00:57	Yasmine Mansour	27 Sep 2026	Berlin	
El Salvador	2:49:34	Kriscia Lorena Garcia	15 May 1988	San Salvador	
England	2:15:24	Paula Radcliffe	13 Apr 2003	London	
Eritrea	2:20:29	Nazret Weldu	18 Jul 2022	Eugene	
Estonia	2:27:04	Jane Salumäe	11 May 1997	Turin	
Eswatini	2:56:24	Priscilla Mamba	19 Mar 2005	Ngodwana	
Ethiopia	2:10:51	Fotyen Tesfay	15 Mar 2026	Barcelona	
Faroe Islands	2:46:37	Marna Egholm	2 Oct 2016	Odense	
Fiji	4:13:06	Anna Cowley	21 Jul 2018	Suva	
Finland	2:20:39	Alisa Vainio	15 Feb 2026	Seville	
France	2:23:13	Mekdes Woldu	16 Mar 2025	Barcelona	(Note: Woldu switched from representing Eritrea to representing France in November 2021.)
French Polynesia	2:49:12	Sophie Gardon	12 Feb 2006	Moorea	
Gabon	2:47:43	Josiane Abougone	27 May 2012	Ottawa	
Gambia	2:45:00	Mariama Jallow	18 Sep 2016	Kassel	
Georgia	3:18:48	Nino Makharadze	17 Nov 2013	Philadelphia	
Germany	2:19:19	Irina Mikitenko	28 Sep 2008	Berlin	
Ghana	2:42:12	Sakat Lariba	21 Sep 2015	Accra	
Gibraltar	3:00:03	Kim Baglietto	18 Feb 2024	Seville	
Greece	2:33:40	Maria Polizou	23 Aug 1998	Budapest	
Greenland	3:02:29	Liza Tuperna Itzchaky	30 Sep 2012	Berlin	
Grenada	3:22:40	Jenifer Boca	4 Nov 1990	New York City	
Guadeloupe	3:07:23	Guylyne Louis	4 Apr 2004	Paris	
Guam	2:59:43	Jen Allred	29 Feb 1992	Pensacola	
Guatemala	2:39:23	Sandra Genoveva	23 Apr 2023	Hamburg	
Guernsey	2:58:40	Penny Buckingham	28 Jul 2002	Manchester	
Guinea	3:20:11	Aïda Diallo-Camara	23 Nov 2003	Carqueiranne	
Guyana	3:01:08	Abidemi Charles	30 Jan 2000	Port of Spain	
Haiti	3:10:51	Bertine Lainé	2 Oct 2014	Miami	
Honduras	2:57:17	Magda Milady Castillo	12 Aug 2001	Edmonton	
Hong Kong	2:31:24	Yiu Kit Ching	16 May 2021	Milan	
Hungary	2:25:52	Nóra Szabó	1 Dec 2024	Valencia	
Iceland	2:35:15	Martha Ernstdóttir	26 Sep 1999	Berlin	
India	2:34:43	Jaisha Orchatteri	30 Aug 2015	Beijing	
Indonesia	2:31:34	Odekta Elvina Naibaho	6 Jul 2025	Gold Coast	
Iran	2:45:23	Mandana Nouri	5 Dec 2021	Valencia	
Iraq	3:22:23	Yasmin Wadhai	20 Jan 2017	Dubai	
Ireland	2:22:23	Catherina McKiernan	1 Nov 1998	Amsterdam	
Isle of Man	2:35:31	Christa Cain	12 Oct 2025	Chicago	
Israel	2:17:45	Lonah Salpeter	1 Mar 2020	Tokyo	
Italy	2:23:14 Wo	Sofiia Yaremchuk	27 Apr 2025	London	
Ivory Coast	4:10:09	Isabelle Konaté	7 Mar 2010	Barcelona	
Jamaica	2:35:28	Mishka-Mae Hyde	23 Nov 2025	Philadelphia	
Japan	2:18:59	Honami Maeda	28 Jan 2024	Osaka	
Jersey	2:50:44	Joann Gorrod	17 Apr 2011	London	
Jordan	2:56:39	Tamara Armoush	28 Apr 2019	London	
Kazakhstan	2:26:42	Zhanna Mamazhanova	14 Apr 2024	Rotterdam	
Kenya	2:09:56	Ruth Chepngetich	13 Oct 2024	Chicago	
Kosovo	3:02:15	Diana Berisha-Klusóczki	23 Sep 2018	Krems	
Kuwait	3:32:26	Taiba Al-Nouri	16 Jan 2016	Kuwait City	
Kyrgyzstan	2:27:27 dh 2:27:46	Irina Bogachova	17 Apr 2000; 24 Oct 1999	Boston; Chicago	
Laos	2:52:57	Lalida Maokhamphiou	12 Oct 2025	Chicago	
Latvia	2:22:56	Jeļena Prokopčuka	30 Jan 2005	Osaka	
Lebanon	2:36:09	Nesrine Leene Njeim	1 Dec 2024	Valencia	
Lesotho	2:28:06	Neheng Khatala	30 May 2021	Cape Town	
Liberia	2:50:10 dh 3:02:03	Monique Maddy	15 Apr 2002; 3 Nov 2002	Boston; New York City	
Libya	3:34:11	Ilaaf Darrat	20 Jan 2019	Houston	
Liechtenstein	2:51:20	Nicole Klinger	11 May 2008	Prague	
Lithuania	2:25:15	Zivile Balciunaite	20 Nov 2005	Tokyo	
Luxembourg	2:29:23	Danièle Kaber	23 Sep 1988	Seoul	
Macau	2:55:05	Hoi Long	1 Dec 2019	Macau	
Madagascar	2:38:21	Clarisse Rasoarizay	6 Sep 2003	Bambous	
Malawi	2:48:34	Tereza Master	14 Aug 2016	Rio de Janeiro	
Malaysia	2:49:28	Yuan Yufang	30 Apr 2000	Kuala Lumpur	
Maldives	3:02:41	Shamha Ahmed	25 Sep 2022	Berlin	
Mali	5:04:08	Yognica Begni	25 Jan 2009	Marrakesh	
Malta	2:36:52	Carol Galea	12 Dec 1996	Florence	
Mauritius	2:26:19	Marie Perrier	3 Dec 2023	Valencia	
Mexico	2:22:59	Madai Perez	22 Oct 2006	Chicago	
Micronesia	3:38:30	Mary Latorres	12 Oct 2025	Chicago	
Moldova	2:27:26	Lilia Fisikovici	28 Apr 2019	London	
Monaco	3:35:39	Adrienne Pastorelly	12 Jan 1992	Marrakesh	
Mongolia	2:24:45	Bayartsogtyn Mönkhzayaa	17 Mar 2024	Seoul	
Montenegro	2:39:07	Slađana Perunović	5 Aug 2012	London	
Morocco	2:21:01	Majida Maayouf	4 Dec 2022	Seville	
Mozambique	4:26:37	Arminda Matsimbe	3 Nov 2019	New York	
Myanmar	2:38:42	Pa Pa	13 Apr 2004	Yangon	
Namibia	2:19:52	Helalia Johannes	6 Dec 2020	Valencia	
Nepal	2:40:23	Santoshi Shrestha	7 Dec 2025	Valencia	
Netherlands	2:13:44	Sifan Hassan	8 Oct 2023	Chicago	
Netherlands Antilles	3:43:27 dh	Nel Geerings	15 Apr 1991	Boston	
New Caledonia	2:29:48	Nadia Prasad	5 Mar 1995	Los Angeles	
New Zealand	2:25:21	Kim Smith	25 Apr 2010	London	
Nicaragua	3:07:13	Yelka Mairena	17 Dec 2017	Managua	
Nigeria	2:40:37	Mary Akor	3 Apr 2004	St. Louis	
Northern Ireland	2:29:34	Ann Marie McGlynn	25 Apr 2021	Wrexham	
Northern Mariana Islands	3:09:49	Mamiko Oshima-Berger	3 Mar 2012	Saipan	
North Korea	2:25:31	Ham Bong-Sil	31 Aug 2003	Paris	
North Macedonia	2:35:29	Adrijana Pop Arsova	15 May 2022	Copenhagen	
Norway	2:21:06	Ingrid Kristiansen	21 Apr 1985	London	
Oman	3:57:33	Zuwena Al-Rawahi	27 Jan 2017	Muscat	
Pakistan	3:39:56	Zeenat Mansoor	3 Nov 2019	New York	
Palau	3:43:31	Jaqueline Keri Telli	9 May 2015	St. Joseph	
Palestine	2:39:28	Mayada Al-Sayad	7 Apr 2019	Hanover	
Panama	2:49:29	Danielle Wagner	29 May 2016	Ottawa	
Papua New Guinea	3:41:14	Rosemary Turare	13 Nov 1994	Goroka	
Paraguay	2:35:17	Carmen Patricia Martínez	30 Apr 2017	Düsseldorf	
Peru	2:25:23	Thalia Valdivia	14 Apr 2024	Rotterdam	
Philippines	2:33:54	Artjoy Torregosa	1 Mar 2026	Tokyo	
Poland	2:24:59; 2:24:18 dh	Aleksandra Lisowska; Wanda Panfil	21 Sep 2025; 15 Apr 1991	Berlin; Boston	
Portugal	2:23:29	Rosa Mota	20 Oct 1985	Chicago	
Puerto Rico	2:31:10	Beverly Ramos	18 Jul 2022	Eugene, Oregon	
Qatar	4:23:30	Hanoof Al-Thani	3 Oct 2021	London	
Romania	2:18:04	Joan Chelimo	17 Apr 2022	Seoul	
Russia	2:20:47	Galina Bogomolova	22 Oct 2006	Chicago	
Rwanda	2:25:54	Clementine Mukandanga	26 Nov 2023	Florence	
Saint Helena	6:30:52	Jacqueline Leo	18 Sep 2003	Saint Helena	
Saint Kitts and Nevis	3:55:39	Vanessa Williams	20 Sep 2014	Charlestown	
Saint Lucia	4:25:39	Lizette Ward	25 Sep 2011	Berlin	
Saint Vincent and the Grenadines	3:18:44	Adelaide Carrington	26 Jan 2003	Port of Spain	
Samoa	3:11:58	Mele Steiner	22 Nov 1981	Auckland	
San Marino	3:10:00	Amy Cesaretti	1 May 1983	Ravenna	
Saudi Arabia	3:07:16	Sarah Attar	7 Oct 2018	Chicago	
Scotland	2:26:40	Stephanie Twell	27 Oct 2019	Frankfurt	
Senegal	3:39:17	Madjiguène Mbaye	21 Nov 2021	Dakar	
Serbia	2:25:23	Olivera Jevtić	13 Apr 2003	Rotterdam	
Seychelles	3:30:53 (Note: Not ratified by the Seychelles Athletics Federation but recognized by World Athletics); 3:34:49	Simone Zapha	6 Jun 2010; 5 Jul 2009	Le Tampon; Reunion	
Sierra Leone	2:47:09	Mamie Konneh-Lahun	13 Apr 2014	London	
Singapore	2:34:41	Yvonne Danson	13 Dec 1995	Chiang Mai	(Note: Representing England, Yvonne Danson ran a personal best of 2:32:24 in August 1994 in Victoria and at the April 1995 Boston Marathon she ran a 2:30:53 that is not ratified by World Athletics. She switched to represent Singapore before December 1995.)
Slovakia	2:33:19	Ludmila Melicherová	22 Apr 1990	Vienna	
Slovenia	2:27:33	Helena Javornik	17 Oct 2004	Amsterdam	
Solomon Islands	3:02:07; 3:02:10	Sharon Firisua	30 Jul 2022; 7 Aug 2021	Birmingham; Sapporo	
Somalia	4:13:15	Aisha Musa	30 Oct 2016	Frankfurt	
South Africa	2:22:22	Glenrose Xaba	20 Oct 2024	Cape Town	
South Korea	2:25:41	Kim Do-yeon	18 Mar 2018	Seoul	
South Sudan	2:33:22	Atalena Loliha	31 May 2025	Stockholm	
Spain	2:21:27	Majida Maayouf	3 Dec 2023	Valencia	(Note: Maayouf has a personal best and Morocccan national record of 2:21:01 set in December 2022, before she switched to representing Spain in October 2023.)
Sri Lanka	2:34:10	Hiruni Wijayaratne	28 Apr 2019	Düsseldorf	
Sudan	2:49:52	Chaltu Niguese Shiferaw	22 Jan 2016	Dubai	
Suriname	3:40:32	Ilsida Toemere	12 Oct 2014	Eindhoven	
Sweden	2:23:12	Abeba Aregawi	24 May 2026	Ottawa	
Switzerland	2:24:30	Fabienne Schlumpf	3 Dec 2023	Valencia	
Syria	3:25:28 dh	Amal Katrib	10 Jun 2018	North Bend	
Taiwan	2:32:41	Tsao Chun-yu	20 Dec 2020	Taipei	
Tajikistan	2:39:03	Gulsara Dadabayeva	26 Oct 2003	Ljubljana	
Tanzania	2:18:03	Magdalena Shauri	12 Oct 2025	Chicago	
Thailand	2:40:40	Jane Vongvorachoti	12 Oct 2014	Chicago	
Timor-Leste	3:03:53	Aguida Amaral	12 Dec 2003	Hanoi	
Togo	3:02:52	Kpeta Tchatom	10 Feb 2018	Parakou	
Tonga	5:09:41 (Note: Chip time was 4:56:39.)	Falamoe Fau’ese Weber	25 Sep 2011	Berlin	
Trinidad and Tobago	2:43:01# 2:43:14	Tonya Nero	8 Dec 2019; 15 Apr 2012	Sacramento; Rotterdam	
Tunisia	2:40:13	Amira Ben Amor	5 Aug 2012	London	
Turkey	2:21:27	Sultan Haydar	3 Dec 2023	Valencia	
Turkmenistan	2:57:36	Tamara Tongush	5 Dec 1985	Ashgabat	
Turks and Caicos Islands	3:45:48	Lynn Robinson	6 Nov 2011	New York City	
Uganda	2:18:26	Stella Chesang	1 Dec 2024	Valencia	
Ukraine	2:23:32	Olena Shurkhno	30 Sep 2012	Berlin	
United Arab Emirates	2:27:08	Alia Saeed Mohammed	19 Feb 2023	Seville	
United Kingdom	2:15:24	Paula Radcliffe	13 Apr 2003	London	
United States	2:18:29	Emily Sisson	9 Oct 2022	Chicago	
U.S. Virgin Islands	2:43:59	Lisha Hamilton	6 Jun 2004	San Diego	
Uruguay	2:25:47	Julia Paternain	26 April 2026	London	
Uzbekistan	2:29:28	Marina Khmelevskaya	24 Sep 2023	Berlin	
Venezuela	2:31:45	Magaly García	3 Dec 2023	Valencia	
Vietnam	2:44:51	Hoàng Thị Ngoc Hoa	21 Jan 2024	Hong Kong	
Wales	2:31:33	Susan Tooby	23 Sep 1988	Seoul	
Yemen	5:15:03 (Note: Chip time was 4:51:53.)	Buthainah Albaity	28 Apr 2019	London	
Zambia	2:37:29	Elizabeth Mukoloma	6 Sep 2025	Lusaka	
Zimbabwe	2:29:20	Tabitha Tsatsa	16 Mar 2008	Seoul	

== See also ==
- Marathon year rankings
- Marathon world record progression
