= 2002 Chicago Marathon =

Footrace held in Chicago, Illinois

25th Chicago Marathon
- Venue: Chicago, United States
- Dates: October 13

Champions
- Men: Khalid Khannouchi (2:05:56)
- Women: Paula Radcliffe (2:17:18)

The 2002 Chicago Marathon was the 25th running of the annual marathon race in Chicago, United States and was held on October 13. The elite men's race was won by Morocco's Khalid Khannouchi in a time of 2:05:56 hours and the women's race was won by British athlete Paula Radcliffe in 2:17:18. Radcliffe's time was a new marathon world best, knocking 89 seconds off the previous mark by Catherine Ndereba (the runner-up in the race). The record only lasted six months, as Radcliffe improved it again at the 2003 London Marathon.

== Results ==
=== Men ===
Position	Athlete	Nationality	Time
1	Khalid Khannouchi	Morocco	2:05:56
2	Daniel Njenga	Kenya	2:06:16
3	Toshinari Takaoka	Japan	2:06:16
4	Paul Tergat	Kenya	2:06:18
5	Abdelkader El Mouaziz	Morocco	2:06:46
6	Alan Culpepper	United States	2:09:41
7	John Kagwe	Kenya	2:10:02
8	Driss El Himer	France	2:11:51
9	Peter Githuka	Kenya	2:12:43
10	Tobias Hiskia	South Africa	2:13:16

=== Women ===
Position	Athlete	Nationality	Time
1	Paula Radcliffe	United Kingdom	2:17:18 WR
2	Catherine Ndereba	Kenya	2:19:26
3	Yōko Shibui	Japan	2:21:22
4	Svetlana Zakharova	Russia	2:21:31
5	Madina Biktagirova	Russia	2:25:20
6	Deena Kastor	United States	2:26:53
7	Kayoko Obata	Japan	2:28:15
8	Nuța Olaru	Romania	2:31:37
9	Masako Chiba	Japan	2:34:36
10	Jeanne Hennessy	United States	2:35:53

== Bibliography ==
- Results. Association of Road Racing Statisticians. Retrieved 2020-04-10.
