= Athletics at the 2002 Commonwealth Games – Women's 5000 metres =

Women's 5000 metres at the Commonwealth Games

The women's 5000 metres event at the 2002 Commonwealth Games was held on 28 July.

The winning margin was 22.34 seconds which as of 2024 remains the only time the women's 5,000 metres was won by more than five seconds at these games.

== Results ==
Rank	Name	Nationality	Time	Notes
1st place, gold medalist(s)	Paula Radcliffe	England	14:31.42	GR
2nd place, silver medalist(s)	Edith Masai	Kenya	14:53.76	
3rd place, bronze medalist(s)	Iness Chepkesis Chenonge	Kenya	15:06.06	PB
4	Dorcus Inzikuru	Uganda	15:18.01	PB
5	Joanne Pavey	England	15:19.91	
6	Benita Johnson	Australia	15:26.55	
7	Restituta Joseph	Tanzania	15:33.07	SB
8	Courtney Babcock	Canada	15:42.83	
9	Anna Thompson	Australia	15:43.92	PB
10	Catherine Berry	England	15:44.87	PB
11	Haley McGregor	Australia	15:47.10	
12	Hawa Hussein	Tanzania	15:48.42	
13	Catherine Chikwakwa	Malawi	15:56.71	NR
14	Gillian Palmer	Scotland	16:29.63	
15	Catherine Dugdale	Wales	16:43.49	
	Christiana Augustine	Nigeria	DNF	
