= 2005 London Marathon =

British athletics event

25th London Marathon
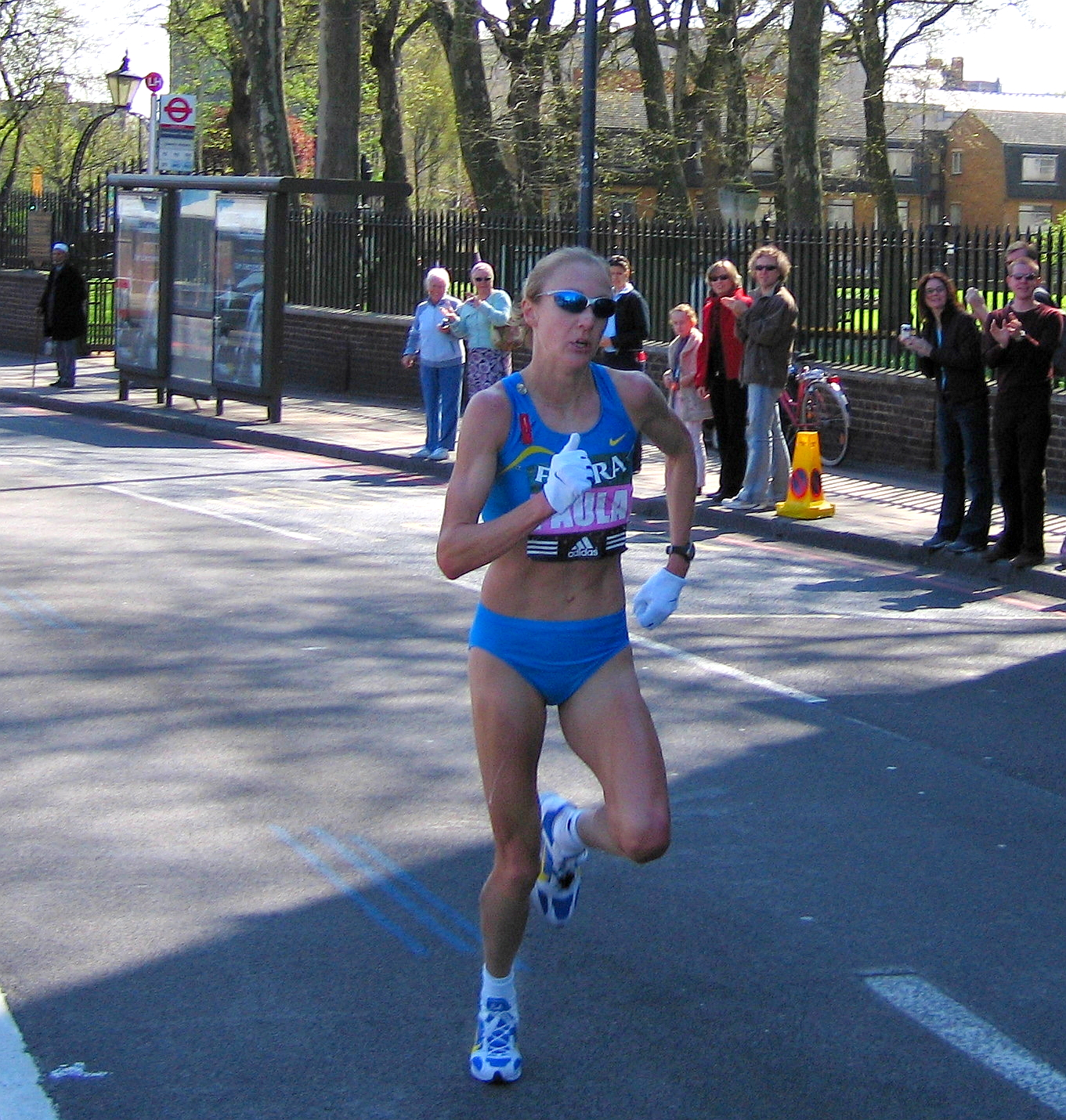
- Radcliffe leading the women's race
- Venue: London, United Kingdom
- Date: 17 April 2005

Champions
- Men: Martin Lel (2:07:26)
- Women: Paula Radcliffe (2:17:42)
- Wheelchair men: Saúl Mendoza (1:35:51)
- Wheelchair women: Francesca Porcellato (1:57:00)

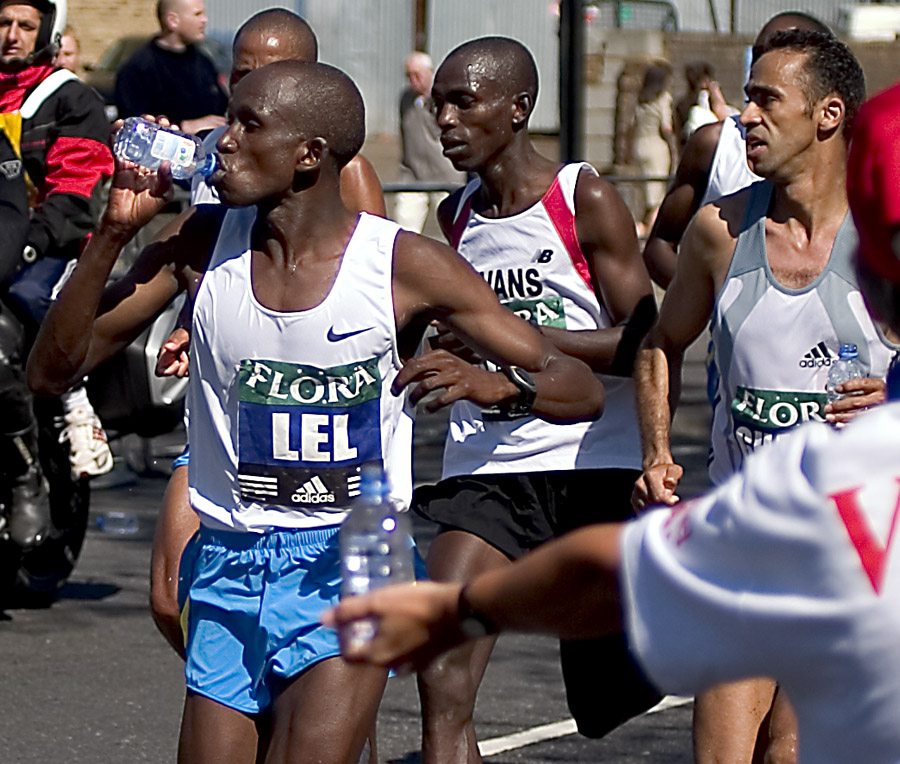
Men's winner Martin Lel drinking water at the race

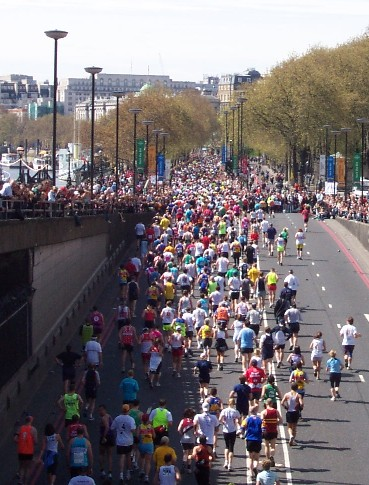
Runners from the mass race

The 2005 London Marathon was the 25th running of the annual marathon race in London, United Kingdom, which took place on Sunday, 17 April. The elite men's race was won by Kenya's Martin Lel in a time of 2:07:26 hours and the women's race was won by home athlete Paula Radcliffe in 2:17:42.

In the wheelchair races, Mexico's Saúl Mendoza (1:35:51) and Italy's Francesca Porcellato (1:57:00) won the men's and women's divisions, respectively.

Around 132,000 people applied to enter the race: 47,969 had their applications accepted and 35,600 started the race. A total of 35,261 runners, 24,690 men and 10,571 women, finished the race.

== Results ==
=== Men ===
Position	Athlete	Nationality	Time
1st place, gold medalist(s)	Martin Lel	Kenya	2:07:26
2nd place, silver medalist(s)	Jaouad Gharib	Morocco	2:07:49
3rd place, bronze medalist(s)	Hendrick Ramaala	South Africa	2:08:32
4	Abdelkader El Mouaziz	Morocco	2:09:03
5	Stefano Baldini	Italy	2:09:25
6	Jon Brown	United Kingdom	2:09:31
7	Toshinari Suwa	Japan	2:10:23
8	Paul Tergat	Kenya	2:11:36
9	Sammy Korir	Kenya	2:12:36
10	Evans Rutto	Kenya	2:12:49
11	Frederick Cherono	Kenya	2:13:58
12	Antoni Peña	Spain	2:14:31
13	Huw Lobb	United Kingdom	2:14:33
14	Kassa Tadesse	Ethiopia	2:15:09
15	Daniel Njenga	Kenya	2:15:25
16	Matt Smith	United Kingdom	2:16:13
17	Luke Kibet Bowen	Kenya	2:16:40
18	Scott Winton	New Zealand	2:17:01
19	Michael Green	United Kingdom	2:18:31
20	Dave Norman	United Kingdom	2:18:34
21	Henrik Sandstad	Norway	2:18:36
—	Joseph Kariuki	Kenya	DNF
—	Joseph Ngolepus	Kenya	DNF
—	Matt O'Dowd	United Kingdom	DNF
—	Hicham Chatt	Morocco	DNF
—	Richard Gardiner	United Kingdom	DNF

=== Women ===
Position	Athlete	Nationality	Time
1st place, gold medalist(s)	Paula Radcliffe	United Kingdom	2:17:42
2nd place, silver medalist(s)	Constantina Diță	Romania	2:22:50
3rd place, bronze medalist(s)	Susan Chepkemei	Kenya	2:24:00
4	Margaret Okayo	Kenya	2:25:22
5	Lyudmila Petrova	Russia	2:26:29
6	Benita Willis	Australia	2:26:32
7	Joyce Chepchumba	Kenya	2:27:01
8	Sonia O'Sullivan	Ireland	2:29:01
9	Mulu Seboka	Ethiopia	2:30:54
10	Mara Yamauchi	United Kingdom	2:31:52
11	Tegla Loroupe	Kenya	2:34:42
12	Hayley Haining	United Kingdom	2:35:23
13	Debbie Mason	United Kingdom	2:36:59
14	Liz Yelling	United Kingdom	2:37:42
15	Susan Partridge	United Kingdom	2:37:50
16	Lucy Hassell	United Kingdom	2:39:20
17	Amy Stiles	United Kingdom	2:39:37
18	Sue Harrison	United Kingdom	2:39:54
19	Sharon Morris	United Kingdom	2:40:18
20	Jenny Clague	United Kingdom	2:41:21
—	Leah Malot	Kenya	DNF
—	Restituta Joseph	Tanzania	DNF

=== Wheelchair men ===
Position	Athlete	Nationality	Time
1st place, gold medalist(s)	Saúl Mendoza	Mexico	1:35:51
2nd place, silver medalist(s)	Jeff Adams	Canada	1:35:54
3rd place, bronze medalist(s)	David Weir	United Kingdom	1:36:03
4	Tushar Patel	United Kingdom	1:36:03
5	Éric Teurnier	France	1:36:03
6	Denis Lemeunier	France	1:36:04
7	Alain Fuss	France	1:36:04
8	Kenny Herriot	United Kingdom	1:41:58
9	Rawat Tana	Thailand	1:46:10
10	Supachai Koysap	Thailand	1:49:41

=== Wheelchair women ===
Position	Athlete	Nationality	Time
1st place, gold medalist(s)	Francesca Porcellato	Italy	1:57:00
2nd place, silver medalist(s)	Shelly Woods	United Kingdom	1:57:03
3rd place, bronze medalist(s)	Tanni Grey-Thompson	United Kingdom	2:02:39
4	Gunilla Wallengren	Sweden	2:16:03
5	Deborah Brennan	United Kingdom	2:18:42
6	Michelle Lewis	United Kingdom	2:32:32
7	Sarah Piercy	United Kingdom	2:48:23
