= 2004 New York City Marathon =

Footrace held in New York City

35th New York City Marathon
- Venue: New York City, New York
- Date: November 7

Champions
- Men: Hendrick Ramaala (2:09:28)
- Women: Paula Radcliffe (2:23:10)
- Wheelchair men: Saúl Mendoza (1:33:16)
- Wheelchair women: Edith Hunkeler (1:53:27)

The 2004 New York City Marathon was the 35th running of the annual marathon race in New York City, New York, which took place on Sunday, November 7. The men's elite race was won by South Africa's Hendrick Ramaala in a time of 2:09:28 hours while the women's race was won by Great Britain's Paula Radcliffe in 2:23:10.

In the wheelchair races, Mexico's Saúl Mendoza (1:33:16) and Switzerland's Edith Hunkeler (1:53:27) won the men's and women's divisions, respectively. In the handcycle race, Australia's Todd Philpott (1:17:12) and Dutchwoman Angelique Simons (1:50:02) were the winners.

A total of 36,513 runners finished the race, 24,563 men and 11,950 women.

== Results ==
=== Men ===
Position	Athlete	Nationality	Time
1st place, gold medalist(s)	Hendrick Ramaala	South Africa	2:09:28
2nd place, silver medalist(s)	Meb Keflezighi	United States	2:09:53
3rd place, bronze medalist(s)	Timothy Cherigat	Kenya	2:10:00
4	Patrick Tambwé	France	2:10:11
5	Benson Barus	Kenya	2:11:23
6	Christopher Cheboiboch	Kenya	2:12:34
7	John Kagwe	Kenya	2:12:35
8	Paul Kirui	Kenya	2:14:04
9	Ryan Shay	United States	2:14:08
10	Ottaviano Andriani	Italy	2:14:51
11	Elarbi Khattabi	Morocco	2:15:22
12	Andrew Letherby	Australia	2:15:48
13	Vasyl Matviychuk	Ukraine	2:16:12
14	Abdihakem Abdirahman	United States	2:17:09
15	John Yuda Msuri	Tanzania	2:18:04
16	Matt Downin	United States	2:18:50
17	Angelo Carosi	Italy	2:19:53
18	Enos Keter	Kenya	2:20:24
19	Kassahun Kabiso	Ethiopia	2:22:21
20	Dan Browne	United States	2:23:27
—	Bob Kennedy	United States	DNF
—	Benoît Zwierzchiewski	France	DNF
—	Laban Kipkemboi	Kenya	DNF
—	Joseph Ngolepus	Kenya	DNF
—	Ben Kimondiu	Kenya	DNF
—	Joseph Kariuki	Kenya	DNF
—	Simon Kiprop	Kenya	DNF
—	Tom Van Hooste	Belgium	DNF
—	Tesfaye Eticha	Ethiopia	DNF

=== Women ===
Position	Athlete	Nationality	Time
1st place, gold medalist(s)	Paula Radcliffe	United Kingdom	2:23:10
2nd place, silver medalist(s)	Susan Chepkemei	Kenya	2:23:13
3rd place, bronze medalist(s)	Lyubov Denisova	Russia	2:25:18
4	Margaret Okayo	Kenya	2:26:31
5	Jeļena Prokopčuka	Latvia	2:26:51
6	Luminita Zaituc	Germany	2:28:15
7	Lornah Kiplagat	Netherlands	2:28:21
8	Larisa Zyusko	Russia	2:29:32
9	Madaí Pérez	Mexico	2:29:57
10	Kerryn McCann	Australia	2:32:06
11	Tegla Loroupe	Kenya	2:33:11
12	Lidiya Grigoryeva	Russia	2:34:39
13	Asha Gigi	Ethiopia	2:36:31
14	Benita Willis	Australia	2:38:03
15	Jenny Crain	United States	2:41:06
16	Molly Austin	United States	2:41:42
17	Emily LeVan	United States	2:43:38
18	Annemette Jensen	Denmark	2:45:28
19	Rosanna Munerotto	Italy	2:47:00
20	Shelly Larson	United States	2:47:47
—	Lyudmila Petrova	Russia	DNF
—	Alevtina Ivanova	Russia	DNF
—	Emily Kroshus	Canada	DNF
—	Deena Kastor	United States	DNF
—	Sylvia Mosqueda	United States	DNF
—	Leah Malot	Kenya	DNF

- † Ran in mass race

=== Wheelchair men ===
Position	Athlete	Nationality	Time
1st place, gold medalist(s)	Saúl Mendoza	United States	1:33:16
2nd place, silver medalist(s)	Krige Schabort	United States	1:33:19
3rd place, bronze medalist(s)	Kelly Smith	Canada	1:33:24
4	Ernst van Dyk	South Africa	1:40:41
5	Aarón Gordian	Mexico	1:41:25
6	Josh George	United States	1:43:02
7	Michel Filteau	Canada	1:43:06
8	Tyler Byers	United States	1:45:36
9	Tony Nogueira	United States	1:45:40
10	Paul Nunnari	Australia	1:46:15

=== Wheelchair women ===
Position	Athlete	Nationality	Time
1st place, gold medalist(s)	Edith Hunkeler	Switzerland	1:53:27
2nd place, silver medalist(s)	Sandra Graf	Switzerland	1:53:37
3rd place, bronze medalist(s)	Diane Roy	Canada	1:57:13
4	Miriam Nibley	United States	2:00:10
5	Christina Ripp	United States	2:03:14
6	Ariadne Hernández	Mexico	2:14:05
7	April Coughlin	United States	2:39:02
8	Collen Morrison	Jamaica	4:38:37
9	Erinelda Gomes	Brazil	5:48:03
10	Corre Meyer	United States	6:56:38

=== Handcycle men ===
Position	Athlete	Nationality	Time
1st place, gold medalist(s)	Todd Philpott	Australia	1:17:12
2nd place, silver medalist(s)	Theo Geeve	Netherlands	1:34:36
3rd place, bronze medalist(s)	John Vink	Netherlands	1:35:30
4	Bogdan Krol	Poland	1:35:35
5	Edward Maalouf	Lebanon	1:39:47

=== Handcycle women ===
Position	Athlete	Nationality	Time
1st place, gold medalist(s)	Angelique Simons	Netherlands	1:50:02
2nd place, silver medalist(s)	Laura Stam	Netherlands	1:53:11
3rd place, bronze medalist(s)	Helene Hines	United States	1:53:25
4	Graziella Calimero	Italy	2:20:03
5	Graciela Ramirez	Mexico	2:49:27
