= Joseph Ngolepus =

Kenyan marathon runner

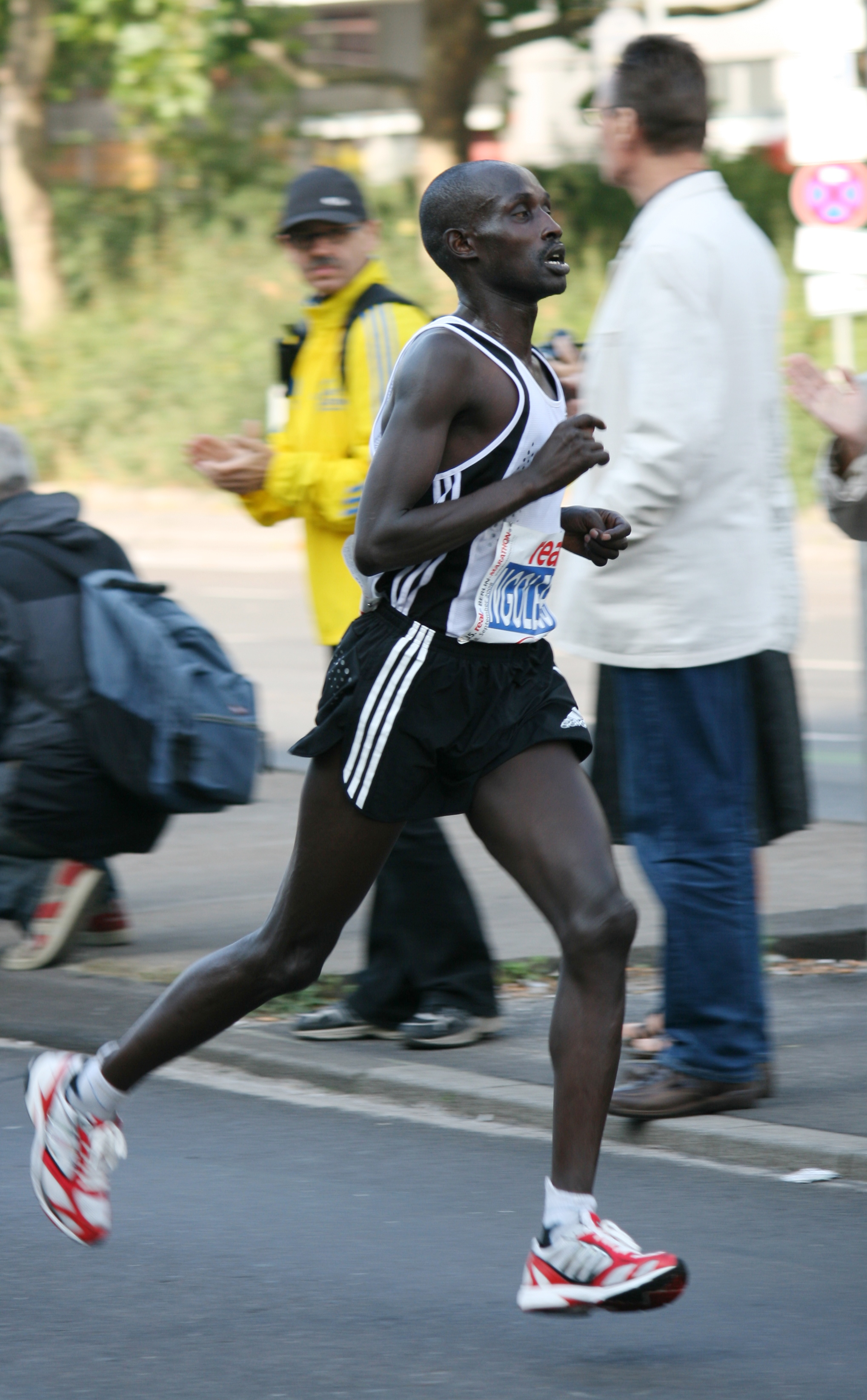
- Joseph Ngolepus during the 2008 Berlin Marathon

Personal information
- Born: 10 April 1975 (age 51) Nyeri, Kenya

Sport
- Sport: Athletics
Medal record
Marathon
World Marathon Majors
Gold medal – first place	2001 Berlin	Marathon
Bronze medal – third place	2003 London	Marathon

Joseph Ngolepus (born 10 April 1975) is a Kenyan former marathon runner who won the 2001 Berlin Marathon, and finished third at the 2003 London Marathon. He also won the 2003 CPC Loop Den Haag half marathon, the 2004 Rock 'n' Roll San Diego Marathon, the 2006 Madrid Marathon, and the 2008 Paderborn Easter Run half marathon.

== Personal life ==
Ngolepus comes from the same region of Kenya as Tegla Loroupe. He has four children.

== Career ==
Ngolepus started training in 1997 alongside Tegla Loroupe. He ran his first marathon in 1999, in a time of 2:16. In 2000, he came fourth at the Rotterdam Marathon in a time of 2:08:49.

Ngolepus entered the 2001 Berlin Marathon as a pacemaker for fellow Kenyans Willy Cheruiyot Kipkirui and William Kiplagat. After 25 kilometres (16 mi) of the race, he decided to try and race for the victory instead. He eventually won, with Cheruiyot second. His finishing time was 2:08:47.

In 2003, Ngolepus won the CPC Loop Den Haag half marathon in a time of 1:00:56. The top six finishers in the race were Kenyan. Later in the year, he came third at the London Marathon, losing in a sprint by one second to Ethiopian Gezahegne Abera and Italy's Stefano Baldini. The top six finished within seven seconds of each other, making it the closest finish in London Marathon history. In 2004, he won the Rock 'n' Roll San Diego Marathon. The conditions were humid and windy, and Ngolepus' winning time of 2:11:04 was the slowest ever winning time at the event, and his split time for the last mile was 5:44. In 2005, Ngolepus came second at the Berlin Half Marathon behind fellow Kenyan Paul Kimugul.

In 2006, Ngolepus won the Madrid Marathon in a course record time of 2:11:30. The previous course record was 2:12:19, set by Tanzanian John Burra 15 years previously. In 2008, Ngolepus fled Kenya during the 2007–2008 Kenyan crisis, in order to compete at the Los Angeles Marathon. Later in the year, he won the Paderborn Easter Run half marathon race, in 1:01:24. In 2011, he was a pacemaker at the Vienna City Marathon, and dropped out of the race after 30 kilometres (19 mi). The race was won by Kenyan John Kiprotich.

== Marathons ==
According to the Association of Road Racing Statisticians, Ngolepus has competed in 31 marathons.

Year	Race	Rank	Time
1999	Stockholm Marathon	6th	2:18:49
1999	Graz Marathon	3rd	2:18:43
2000	Rotterdam Marathon	4th	2:08:49
2000	Chicago Marathon	29th	2:27:29
2000	Palermo Marathon	1st	2:13:48
2001	Rotterdam Marathon	—	DNF
2001	Berlin Marathon	1st	2:08:47
2002	Hamburg Marathon	25th	2:21:29
2002	Vienna City Marathon	4th	2:13:18
2002	Berlin Marathon	20th	2:14:36
2003	London Marathon	3rd	2:07:57 PB
2003	Chicago Marathon	12th	2:14:23
2004	London Marathon	11th	2:12:02
2004	San Diego Marathon	1st	2:11:04
2004	New York City Marathon	—	DNF
2005	London Marathon	—	DNF
2005	Berlin Marathon	5th	2:10:10
2005	Singapore Marathon	3rd	2:16:38
2006	Madrid Marathon	1st	2:11:30
2006	Berlin Marathon	—	DNF
2006	Singapore Marathon	36th	2:36:03
2007	Essen Marathon	2nd	2:20:08
2008	Berlin Marathon	6th	2:12:06.7
2009	Rotterdam Marathon	—	DNF
2009	Prague Marathon	—	DNF
2009	Berlin Marathon	—	DNF
2009	Frankfurt Marathon	—	DNF
2010	Ljubljana Marathon	10th	2:17:03
2011	Prague Marathon	—	DNF
2011	Hamburg Marathon	—	DNF
2011	Siberian International Marathon	3rd	2:25:41
