= 2008 Berlin Marathon =

Road running event in Berlin, Germany

35th Berlin Marathon
- Venue: Berlin, Germany
- Dates: 28 September 2008

Champions
- Men: Haile Gebrselassie (2:03:59)
- Women: Irina Mikitenko (2:19:19)

The 2008 Berlin Marathon was the 35th edition of the Berlin Marathon. The marathon took place in Berlin, Germany, on 28 September 2008 and was the fourth World Marathon Majors race of the year.

The men's race was won by Haile Gebrselassie in 2:03:59 hours and the women's race was won by Irina Mikitenko in a time of 2:19:19 hours.

== Results ==
=== Men ===
Position	Athlete	Nationality	Time
1st place, gold medalist(s)	Haile Gebrselassie	Ethiopia	2:03:59 WR
2nd place, silver medalist(s)	James Kwambai	Kenya	2:05:36
3rd place, bronze medalist(s)	Charles Kamathi	Kenya	2:07:48
4	Mariko Kiplagat Kipchumba	Kenya	2:09:03
5	Mesfin Adamasu	Ethiopia	2:12:02
6	Joseph Ngolepus	Kenya	2:12:07
7	Kenjiro Jitsui	Japan	2:12:48
8	Toshinari Suwa	Japan	2:13:04
9	Falk Cierpinski	Germany	2:13:30
10	Francis Kiprop	Kenya	2:14:30

=== Women ===
Position	Athlete	Nationality	Time
1st place, gold medalist(s)	Irina Mikitenko	Germany	2:19:19 NR
2nd place, silver medalist(s)	Askale Tafa	Ethiopia	2:21:31
3rd place, bronze medalist(s)	Helena Kirop	Kenya	2:25:01
4	Rose Cheruiyot	Kenya	2:26:25
5	Gulnara Vygovskaya	Russia	2:30:03
6	Shuru Deriba	Ethiopia	2:31:20
7	Edyta Lewandowska	Poland	2:33:00
8	Evelyne Kimuria	Kenya	2:35:53
9	Daniela Cîrlan	Romania	2:36:18
10	Živilė Balčiūnaitė	Lithuania	2:36:40
