= 2001 Berlin Marathon =

Road running event in Berlin, Germany

28th Berlin Marathon
- Venue: Berlin, Germany
- Dates: 30 September 2001

Champions
- Men: Joseph Ngolepus (2:08:47)
- Women: Naoko Takahashi (2:19:46)

The 2001 Berlin Marathon was the 28th running of the annual marathon race held in Berlin, Germany, held on 30 September 2001. Kenya's Joseph Ngolepus (entering as a pacemaker) won the men's race in 2:08:47 hours. The women's race was won by Japan's Naoko Takahashi in a world record time of 2:19:46, as she became the first woman to break the 2 hour 20 minute barrier.

== Results ==
=== Men ===
Position	Athlete	Nationality	Time
1	Joseph Ngolepus	Kenya	2:08:47
2	Willy Cheruiyot Kipkirui	Kenya	2:09:08
3	William Kiplagat	Kenya	2:09:55
4	Tsuyoshi Ogata	Japan	2:10:06
5	Danilo Goffi	Italy	2:10:35
6	Frederick Chumba	Kenya	2:10:36
7	Makhosonke Fika	South Africa	2:10:47
8	Viktor Röthlin	Switzerland	2:10:54
9	Tesfaye Eticha	Ethiopia	2:11:19
10	João N’Tyamba	Angola	2:11:40

=== Women ===
Position	Athlete	Nationality	Time
1	Naoko Takahashi	Japan	2:19:46
2	Tegla Loroupe	Kenya	2:28:03
3	Kathrin Weßel	Germany	2:28:27
4	Shiki Sekiuchi	Japan	2:33:23
5	Ai Sugihara	Japan	2:34:56
6	Bev Hartigan	United Kingdom	2:36:02
7	Faustina-Maria Ramos	Spain	2:36:25
8	Dagmar Rabensteiner	Austria	2:38:03
9	Christine Döllinger	Germany	2:38:52
10	Susanne Johansson	Sweden	2:40:29
