= Paula Craig =

British former detective, cyclist, former runner and paratriathlete

Paula Craig MBE
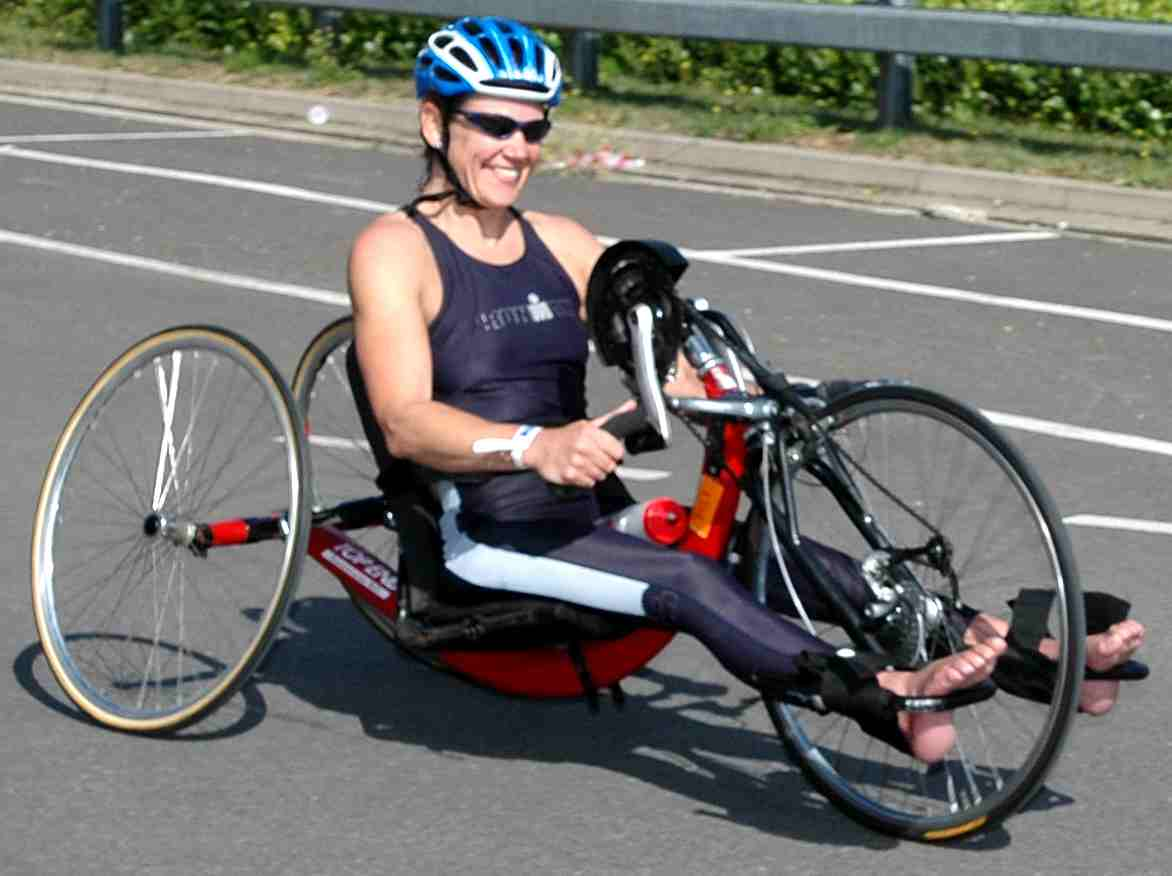
- Craig in 2005
- Born: 1963 (age 62–63); Fishguard, United Kingdom
- Occupations: Police officer, motivational speaker
- Employer: Metropolitan Police
- Known for: Detective inspector in a wheelchair

Paula Craig MBE (born 1963) is a British former detective, cyclist, former runner, paratriathlete and aspiring Channel swimmer. After she became paraplegic she continued in her career rising to the rank of inspector. She competed in the London Marathon and took part in a relay swim of the English Channel.

== Life ==
Craig was born in 1963 to Stan and Phyllis in the Welsh port of Fishguard, where she was raised. She was a keen triathlete. She ran the London Marathon in under three hours.

In 2001, Craig had been a police officer with the Metropolitan Police for 15 years and was living in Hemel Hempstead. While training for the Triathlete World Championship, she was knocked off her bicycle by a car on the Redbourne Road (A5183). She became paraplegic as her spinal cord was severed. She recovered in Fishguard.

The police made adjustments so that Craig could continue her career. Craig credits Police Commissioner Sir John Stevens for his support, as the police were not at that time subject to the Disability Act, which later obliged employers in Britain to make reasonable adjustments for those with disabilities. (The police were included from October 2004.) Craig returned to her career, rising to become a detective inspector working in the Metropolitan Police's Serious Crime Group. She would surprise those involved with crime scenes, when junior officers would point out the person in charge and all they could see was a woman in a wheelchair. She was awarded an MBE for her services to policing in 2005 and she won a paratriathlon in Honolulu.

Craig returned to the London Marathon after the accident in 2001. She is said to be the first woman to have competed as a runner and as a wheelchair racer. She finished third behind Tanni Grey-Thompson who had helped her prepare for the event.

In 2020, Craig joined an attempt to relay-swim the English Channel. She became involved after giving motivational talks to Channel swimmers who repeatedly asked when she was going to swim it. The swim was in aid of a British charity, involving a team of six swimmers. The swim was done in 2022, and made Craig the first person with a complete spinal cord injury to be part of a relay team’s swim of the English Channel from Dover without a wetsuit. She managed to stop her legs from sinking using her core strength. She did two hour-long swims.

Craig served in the police for 31 years, and has since become a motivational speaker.
