= Paula Radcliffe =

English long-distance runner (born 1973)

Paula Radcliffe OBE
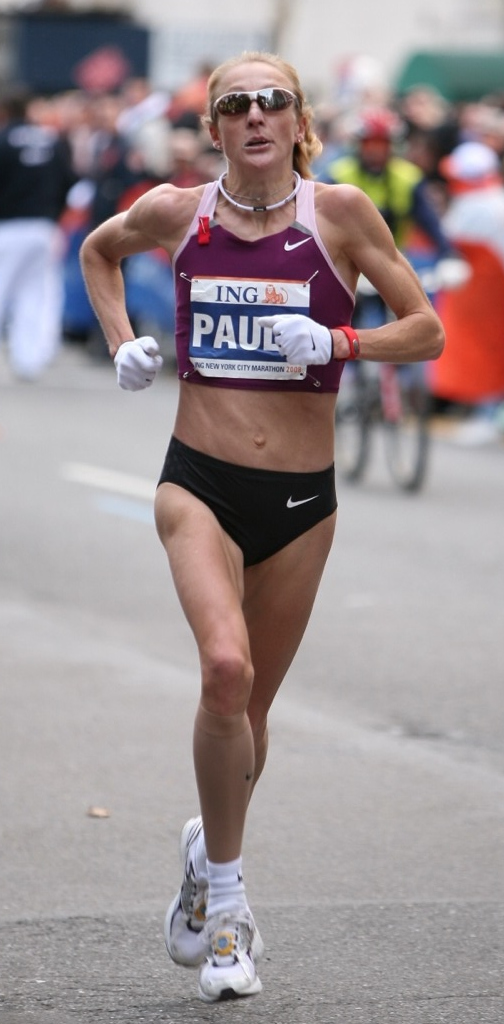
- Radcliffe at the 2008 New York City Marathon

Personal information
- Born: 17 December 1973 (age 52) Davenham, Cheshire, England
- Height: 5 ft 8 in (173 cm)
- Weight: 119 lb (54 kg)
- Spouse: Gary Lough
- Children: 2

Sport
- Country: Great Britain; England
- Club: Bedford & County Athletic Club; Nike, Beaverton
- Retired: April 2015

Achievements and titles
- Olympic finals: 1996 5000 m, 5th 2000 10,000 m, 4th 2004 Marathon, DNF; 10,000 m, DNF; 2008 Marathon, 23rd
- World finals: 1993 3000 m, 7th 1995 5000 m, 5th 1997 5000 m, 4th 1999 10,000 m, Silver; 2001 10,000 m, 4th 2005 10,000 m, 9th Marathon, Gold
- Personal bests: 3000 m: 8:22.20 NR (Monaco 2002); 5000 m: 14:29.11 (Bydgoszcz 2004); 10,000 m: 30:01.09 (Munich 2002); Half marathon: 65:40a NR (South Shields 2003); Marathon: 2:15:25 NR (London 2003)
Medal record
Women's athletics
Representing Great Britain
World Championships
Gold medal – first place	2005 Helsinki	Marathon
Silver medal – second place	1999 Seville	10,000 m
World Marathon Majors
Gold medal – first place	2002 London	Marathon
Gold medal – first place	2002 Chicago	Marathon
Gold medal – first place	2003 London	Marathon
Gold medal – first place	2004 New York	Marathon
Gold medal – first place	2005 London	Marathon
Gold medal – first place	2007 New York	Marathon
Gold medal – first place	2008 New York	Marathon
Bronze medal – third place	2011 Berlin	Marathon
World Cross Country Championships
Gold medal – first place	1992 Boston	Junior race
Gold medal – first place	2001 Ostend	Long race
Gold medal – first place	2002 Dublin	Long race
Silver medal – second place	1997 Turin	Long race
Silver medal – second place	1998 Marrakesh	Long race
Silver medal – second place	2001 Ostend	Short race
Bronze medal – third place	1999 Belfast	Long race
World Half Marathon Championships
Gold medal – first place	2000 Veracruz	Individual
Gold medal – first place	2001 Bristol	Individual
Gold medal – first place	2003 Vilamoura	Individual
European Championships
Gold medal – first place	2002 Munich	10,000 m
European Cross Country Championships
Gold medal – first place	1998 Ferrara	Individual
Gold medal – first place	2003 Edinburgh	Individual
Gold medal – first place	2003 Edinburgh	Team
European Cup
Gold medal – first place	1998 Saint Petersburg	5000 m
Gold medal – first place	1999 Paris	5000 m
Gold medal – first place	2004 Bydgoszcz	5000 m
Silver medal – second place	1998 Saint Petersburg	1500 m
Silver medal – second place	2001 Bremen	5000 m
Bronze medal – third place	1997 Munich	3000 m
Representing England
Commonwealth Games
Gold medal – first place	2002 Manchester	5000 m

Paula Jane Radcliffe (born 17 December 1973) is a English former long-distance runner. She is a three-time winner of the London Marathon (2002, 2003, 2005), three-time New York Marathon champion (2004, 2007, 2008), the 2002 Chicago Marathon winner, and the 2005 World Champion in the marathon. She was previously the fastest female marathoner of all time, and held the women's marathon world record with a time of 2:15:25 for 16 years from 2003 to 2019, when it was broken by Brigid Kosgei.

Radcliffe is a former world champion in the marathon, half marathon and cross country. She has also been European champion over 10,000 metres and in cross country. On the track, Radcliffe won the 10,000 metres silver medal at the 1999 World Championships and was the 2002 Commonwealth champion at 5000 metres. She represented Great Britain at the Olympics in four consecutive games (1996 to 2008), although she never won an Olympic medal.

Her running has earned her a number of accolades including the BBC Sports Personality of the Year, Laureus World Comeback of the Year, IAAF World Athlete of the Year, AIMS World Athlete of the Year (three times) and a Member of the Order of the British Empire (MBE). She has also been nominated for World Sportswoman of the year on several occasions. In 2010, she was inducted into the England Athletics Hall of Fame. She was inducted into the Loughborough University Hall of Fame in 2015.

Radcliffe ended her competitive running career at the 2015 London Marathon, although she later entered the 2025 editions of the Tokyo and Boston marathons.

== Early life ==
Radcliffe was born on 17 December 1973 in Davenham near Northwich, Cheshire. Her family then moved to nearby Barnton where she attended Little Leigh Primary School. Despite suffering from asthma and anaemia, she took up running at the age of seven, influenced by her father who was a keen amateur marathon runner and joined Frodsham Athletic Club. Her family later moved to Kingsley.

When Radcliffe was aged 12, the family moved to Oakley, Bedfordshire and she became a member of Bedford & County Athletics Club. Her joining the club coincided with a talented and dedicated coach, Alex Stanton, building the women's and girls' sections into one of the strongest in the country, in spite of Bedford's relatively small size.

Radcliffe's father became club vice-chairman and her mother, a fun-runner, managed the women's cross-country team. Her first race at a national level came as a 12-year-old in 1986 when she placed 299th out of around 600 in the girls' race of the English Schools Cross Country Championships. She finished fourth in the same race one year later.

Radcliffe attended Sharnbrook Upper School and Community College. She went on to study French, German and economics at Loughborough University, gaining a degree in Modern European Studies.

== Running career ==
Radcliffe's father was a keen marathon runner as a young man. He took up the hobby again in an attempt to lose weight after giving up smoking. He famously appears in the photo of John Lennon playing on stage with The Quarrymen on 6th July 1957, the day John first met Paul McCartney, https://www.thetimes.com/culture/books/article/get-back-boys-who-became-beatles-hunter-davies-review-nx5qmq9gnDespite suffering from asthma Radcliffe took up running at the age of seven. In 1992 Radcliffe discovered that she suffers from anaemia. Radcliffe was diagnosed with exercise induced asthma at the age of 14 after blacking out whilst training. During her father's training jogs in the woods, Radcliffe and her brother would often run with him for a mile or two. Radcliffe attended Frodsham Athletic Club until the age of nine, Radcliffe became a member of Bedford & County Athletics Club, when they moved to Oakley. There she was coached by Alex Stanton, who still fulfilled that role in her professional career. Stanton started to coach Radcliffe at the age of 12 after his wife Rosemary spotted her talent. At the age of 10 Radcliffe, accompanied by her father, watched Ingrid Kristiansen run in the London Marathon, inspiring her to become an athlete. Her first race at a national level came as a 12-year-old in 1986, when she placed 299th in the English Schools Cross Country Championships. In 1991 Radcliffe won the English Schools 1500 metres title.

=== 1992–1996 ===
"I'm not looking to make a living out of it. Obviously it's nice that there's a bit of money coming in but that's not my goal. I just want to do my best and still enjoy it. I want to keep on enjoying it, keep on improving, get as much out of it as I can and put as much back as I can."

— Radcliffe a week after finishing second in her first senior race.

At the 1992 IAAF World Cross Country Championships, Radcliffe, took the Junior title, beating Wang Junxia and Gete Wami in Boston, after recovering from a bad asthma attack in the weeks beforehand. Radcliffe then went to the Junior track World championships and finished fourth in the 3,000 metres. In her first senior race, in Durham at the start of 1993, Radcliffe finished second to Olympic Champion Derartu Tulu. At the age of 19 Radcliffe finished in seventh place at the 1993 World Championships. Radcliffe claimed back to back World Cross Challenge wins at Durham and Mallusk to start the 1994 season. Radcliffe missed the World Cross Country Championships with a foot injury. Radcliffe was initially misdiagnosed with the injury which forced her to miss all of 1994 and thought about quitting as the injury would not get better. At the Fanny Blankers-Koen Games in Hengelo in 1995 Radcliffe outkicked Tulu to run the third fastest time by a British woman for the 5,000 metres. At the World championships, Radcliffe qualified comfortably for the final of the 5,000 metres, where she finished fifth. At the 1996 Securicor Games Radcliffe ran the 5,000 metres finishing second. The Olympic Games saw Radcliffe finish fifth in the 5,000 metres. Radcliffe rounded off 1996 by finishing third in a cross country race in Durham.

=== 1997–2000 ===
1997 saw Radcliffe split Wami and Tulu, and win the silver medal at the 1997 IAAF World Cross Country Championships. Radcliffe became the first woman to defend the Fifth Avenue Mile title. In the 1997 World Championships, Radcliffe finished in 4th place over the 5,000 metres. Wami again outsprinted Radcliffe in her final race of 1997, in the Brussels cross country event. Radcliffe had dropped out of Durham's cross country race with flu at the start of 1998, but bounced back to finish third in Dublin. At the 1998 edition of the World Cross Country, Radcliffe again won the silver medal. Radcliffe set a new world best for 5 miles (8.0 km) on the road around Balmoral Castle. At the European Cup Radcliffe, captaining the team, won the 5,000 metres and finished second in the 1500 metres. Radcliffe set the pace in the 10,000 metres at the European Championships, but finished fifth. Radcliffe, who was suffering from a virus, took some time off, before returning to the cross country discipline, where she won her first senior title by taking the European Long course race. 1998 finished with a fourth-place finish in Brussels.

Radcliffe started 1999 by finishing fourth in Durham. At the World Cross Country championships, Radcliffe finished with the bronze medal. Radcliffe then ran the seventh fastest 10,000 metres ever at the European 10,000 metres challenge. At the London Grand Prix, Radcliffe took two seconds off her own British record in the 5,000 metres. Radcliffe took the silver at the World Championships behind finishing behind Wami in the 10,000 metres. Radcliffe and Loruope found themselves at the front and tried to get rid of Wami but failed as the Ethiopian took the title. At the Berlin Golden league meeting, Radcliffe finished eighth in the 5,000 metres. Radcliffe then ran the second fastest half marathon by a British woman, finishing third on her debut at the distance at the Great North Run, despite getting into a tangle with a spectator.

Starting 2000, Radcliffe won the Stormont Cross Country race for a third time. Radcliffe then finished fourth in Durham. Radcliffe then sustained a knee injury. For the European Cup, Radcliffe joined a host of other British athletes by pulled out injured. However, Radcliffe soon returned to the track for the first time since March after a virus, a knee operation and a calf muscle tear had kept her out; to race over 1,500 metres in Barcelona. In her first race since the World Cross Country, Radcliffe finished 11th. At the London Grand Prix, Radcliffe finished second, one second outside of her British record, in only her second track race of the season. At the Weltklasse Zürich IAAF Golden League meeting Radcliffe competed in the 3,000 metres and finished in fourth place. At the UK trials won the 5,000 metres title. The British Grand Prix saw Radcliffe race over 3000 metres, where once again she finished third. At the 2000 Olympic Games in Sydney, Radcliffe finished sixth in her 10,000 metres heat to qualify for the final. In the final Radcliffe set a new British record, but crossed the line in fourth and was highly disappointed to miss out on a medal. Radcliffe returned to action by winning the BUPA Ireland five-mile race. At the Great North Run, Radcliffe ran a new European record for the half marathon, as she won the race in a time of 67 minutes and 7 seconds. Radcliffe was then selected for the 2000 IAAF World Half Marathon Championships in Mexico. Radcliffe won her first World title, despite suffering a panic attack when her nose tape, designed to help her breathe, fell off halfway round. The good run of form came to an end, when she turned her attention to the Cross Country events and finished third in Brussels. Radcliffe confirmed that her last race of the year would be the Great North Cross Country. There Radcliffe defeated Tulu by seventy-five seconds, in eight inches of snow.

She won back-to-back titles in the 2000 and 2001 IAAF World Half Marathon Championships, winning a third title in 2003.

==== Cross country champion ====
On 24 March, Radcliffe won the Ostend, Belgium-held World Cross Country Championships 2001 title in a time of 27:49.

Held in March in Dublin, Radcliffe defended her title in the Women's Long Race when she won the 2002 IAAF World Cross Country Championships title for a second year. She won in 26:46.

=== Marathon world record ===
In 2002, Radcliffe made the move up to the marathon, a decision that immediately paid off with victory at her debut in that year's London Marathon on 14 April 2002 in a world's best time for a women's only race (2:18:55). Her time was the second quickest in women's marathon history behind the world record of 2:18:47 set by Catherine Ndereba, of Kenya, in Chicago.

Later that year, Radcliffe set a world record time of 2:17:18 in the Chicago Marathon on 13 October 2002, breaking the previous record by a minute and a half.

She was appointed a Member of the Order of the British Empire (MBE) in the 2002 Birthday Honours for services to athletics. She said: "It means a great deal to me, it's a great honour and it really tops off an amazing year. To come here and receive this and to meet the Queen at the end of it just finishes it off perfectly."

Later the same year, she became the BBC Sports Personality of the Year, making her the first woman in over a decade to be honoured with the accolade. Paula thanked her husband Gary Lough, her coach Alex Stanton and her physio, Gerard Hartmann.

=== Further world records ===
Radcliffe set her last women's marathon world record during the 2003 London Marathon in April, with a time of 2:15:25. The performance is one of the highest of score's values in terms of the IAAF World ranking points.

Radcliffe is the former world record holder for the women's road 10k in a time of 30 minutes and 21 seconds, which she set on 23 February 2003 in the World's Best 10K in San Juan, Puerto Rico.

Radcliffe won the 2004 New York City Marathon in a time of 2:23:10, beating Kenya's Susan Chepkemei.

=== 2004 Athens Olympics ===
Radcliffe did not compete in the London Marathon in 2004, but was the favourite to win a gold medal in the marathon at the Olympic Games in Athens. However, she suffered an injury to her leg just two weeks prior to the event and had to use a high dose of anti-inflammatory drugs. This had an adverse effect on her stomach, hindering food absorption. She ended up withdrawing from the race after 36 km (22 mi). Five days later she started in the 10,000 metres but, still suffering from the effects of the marathon, retired with eight laps remaining. Radcliffe said "You go through bad stages in a marathon, but never as bad as that", "I've never before not been able to finish and I'm desperately trying to find a reason for what happened", "I just feel numb – this is something I worked so hard for."

Additionally, Radcliffe, like many other athletes, complained about the very high temperatures that prevailed in Athens at the time of the Olympic games.

Regarded as Great Britain's best gold medal hope in athletics, her withdrawal made headlines in the UK, with editorial stances ranging from support to negativity, with some newspapers deriding Radcliffe for 'quitting', rather than going on to finish the race. Television pictures showed Radcliffe in a clearly distressed state after dropping out of the marathon, being comforted by two friends from her early running days.

=== 2005: Marathon World Champion ===
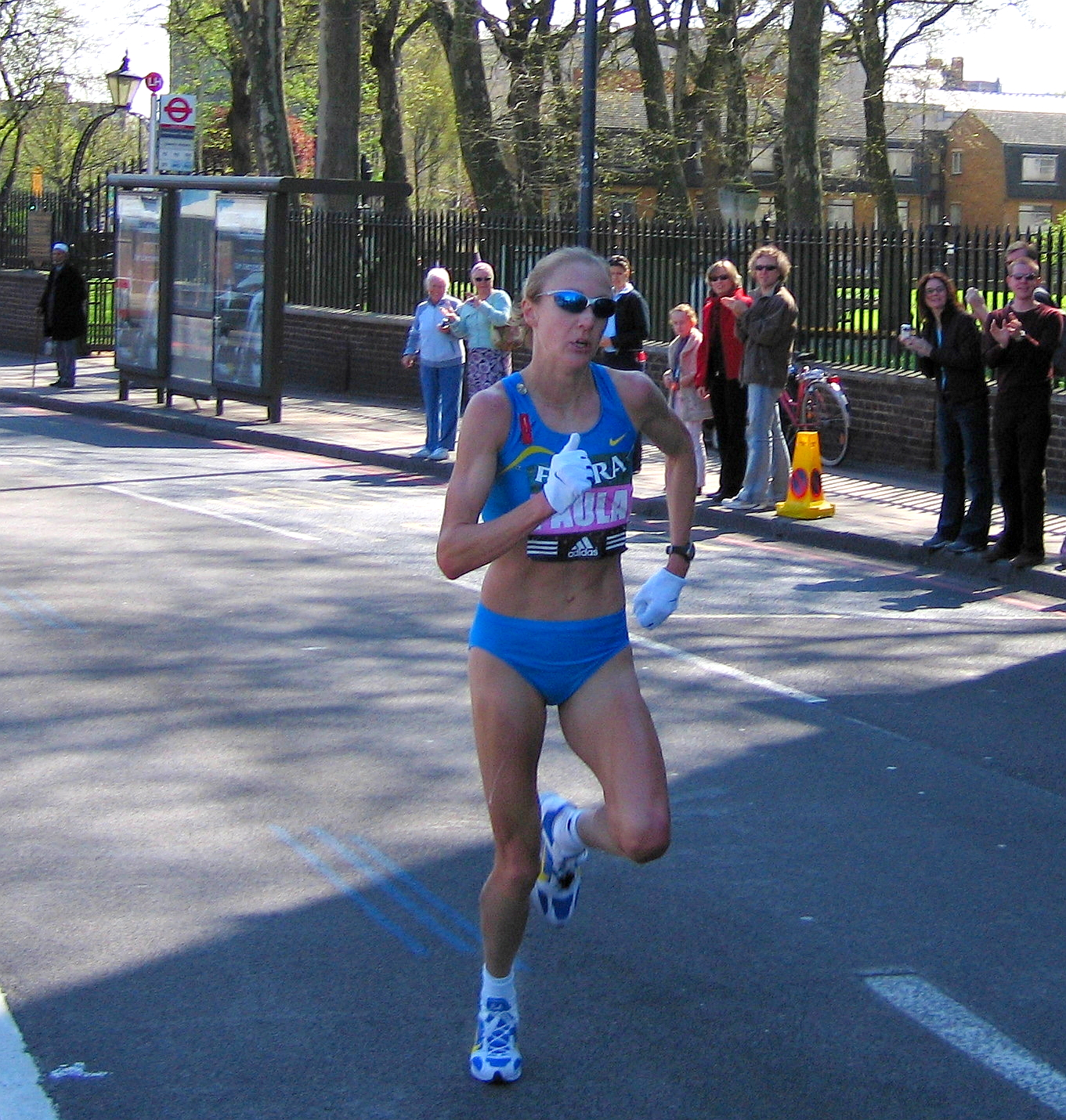
Paula Radcliffe leading the London Marathon in 2005, near to Limehouse in east London.

At the 2005 London Marathon, Radcliffe won with a time of 2:17:42, a world's best time for a women's only race by over a minute. The race is remembered for a notorious moment towards the end when Radcliffe, hindered by runner's diarrhoea and in need for a toilet break, stopped and defecated on the side of the road in view of the crowd and TV cameras which broadcast the incident live. After the race, she apologised to viewers and explained what happened, "I was losing time because I was having stomach cramps and I thought 'I just need to go and I'll be fine'. ... I didn't really want to resort to that in front of hundreds of thousands of people. Basically I needed to go. I started feeling it between 15 and 16 miles (26 km) and probably carried on too long before stopping. I must have eaten too much beforehand". In November 2006, the incident was voted top running moment in history in the UK from a choice of ten "unforgettable moments".

On 14 August 2005 at the World Championships held in Helsinki she won Britain's only gold medal when she took the marathon title, dominating the race and setting a championship record time of 2:20:57. Catherine Ndereba of Kenya finished in second place, more than a minute behind. Radcliffe said: "It pretty much went according to plan. If somebody had been with me at the end I think I could have pushed it up a bit more." She and three other British runners were also awarded third place in the team competition.

=== Family and autobiography ===
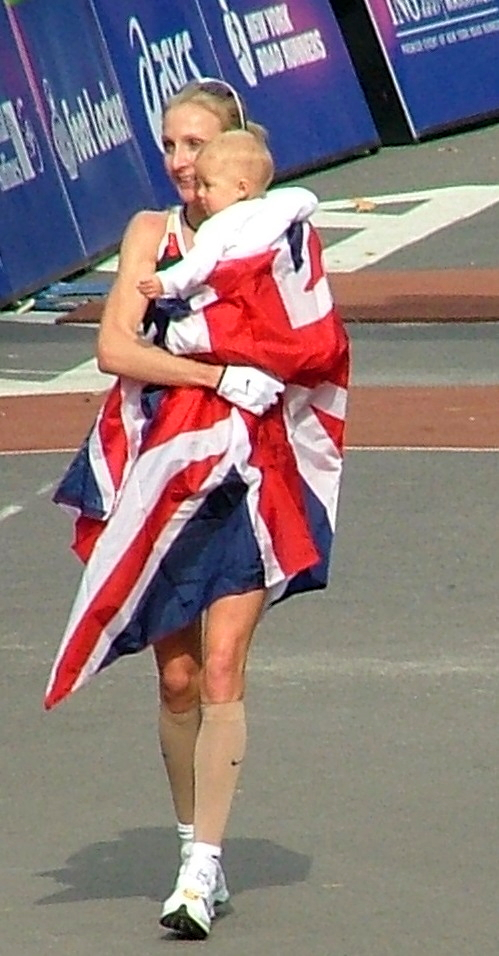
Paula Radcliffe with daughter Isla at the New York City Marathon, 2007

Radcliffe took a break through the 2006 season owing to injuries and in July announced that she was expecting her first child. Her comeback was further delayed in 2007 as a result of a stress fracture in her lower back.

Radcliffe chose not to defend her world marathon crown in 2007, in order to undertake further rehabilitation, but insisted she wanted to compete in the next two Olympics. She made her return to competitive running on 30 September 2007, taking part in the BUPA Great North Run in the UK on Tyneside. This was her first race in almost two years. Radcliffe finished second behind US runner Kara Goucher.

Radcliffe made her marathon return at the New York City Marathon on 4 November 2007 which she won with an official time of 2:23:09.

Radcliffe released an autobiography in 2004, Paula: My Story So Far.

=== 2008–09: Beijing Olympics and fitness problems ===
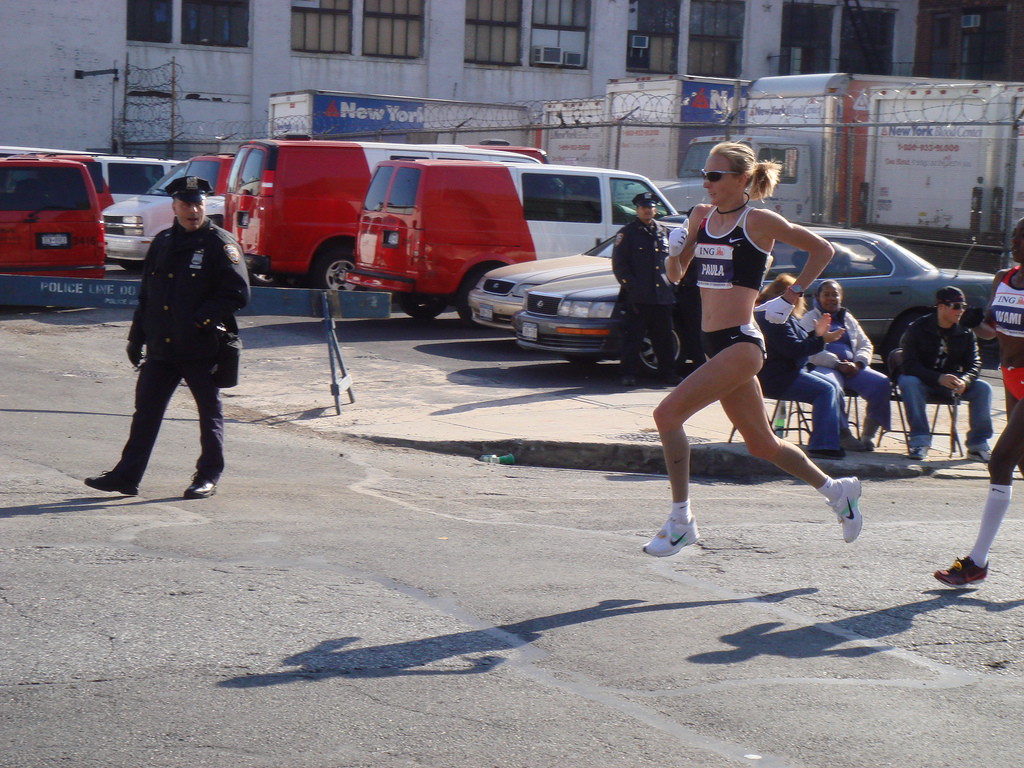
Paula Radcliffe at mile 14, New York City Marathon 2007

Radcliffe withdrew from the 2008 London Marathon due to a foot injury. Shortly after the London Marathon, it was also revealed that Radcliffe was suffering from an injury to her hip, preventing her from running. Originally thought to be a muscular problem, scans later revealed it was a stress fracture to her femur. Radcliffe won the 2008 Great South Run in 51 minutes 11 seconds, 11 seconds off of Sonia O'Sullivan's course record. In May, Radcliffe broke her left leg.

Radcliffe managed to get to fitness level for the 2008 Summer Olympics, but cramped during the marathon to the point where she had to stop running and stretch. She resumed the race and finished in 23rd place overall.

Radcliffe won the 2008 New York City Marathon, making it her third victory at the competition with a time of 2:23:56. Russian Lyudmila Petrova came in second, and American Kara Goucher took third.

Following the New York Marathon, Radcliffe suffered more injury setbacks: she had to withdraw from the 2009 London Marathon due to a fractured toe. In March that year, she had a bunion removed which doctors believed was the root cause of her other injuries at that time. She did not run competitively for almost 10 months, but made herself available for inclusion in the 2009 British team for the World Championships in Athletics. She announced that the New York City Half Marathon would be a testing ground for her fitness before the competition.

Radcliffe went on to win the New York City Half Marathon in 1:09:45, two seconds off the course record. However, after this she pulled out of the World Championships as she felt unfit, and she missed the 2009 IAAF World Half Marathon Championships in Birmingham due to a bout of tonsillitis. She returned to action at the 2009 New York City Marathon but failed to notch her third consecutive victory, instead fading to fourth place with knee problems.

=== 2011 onwards ===
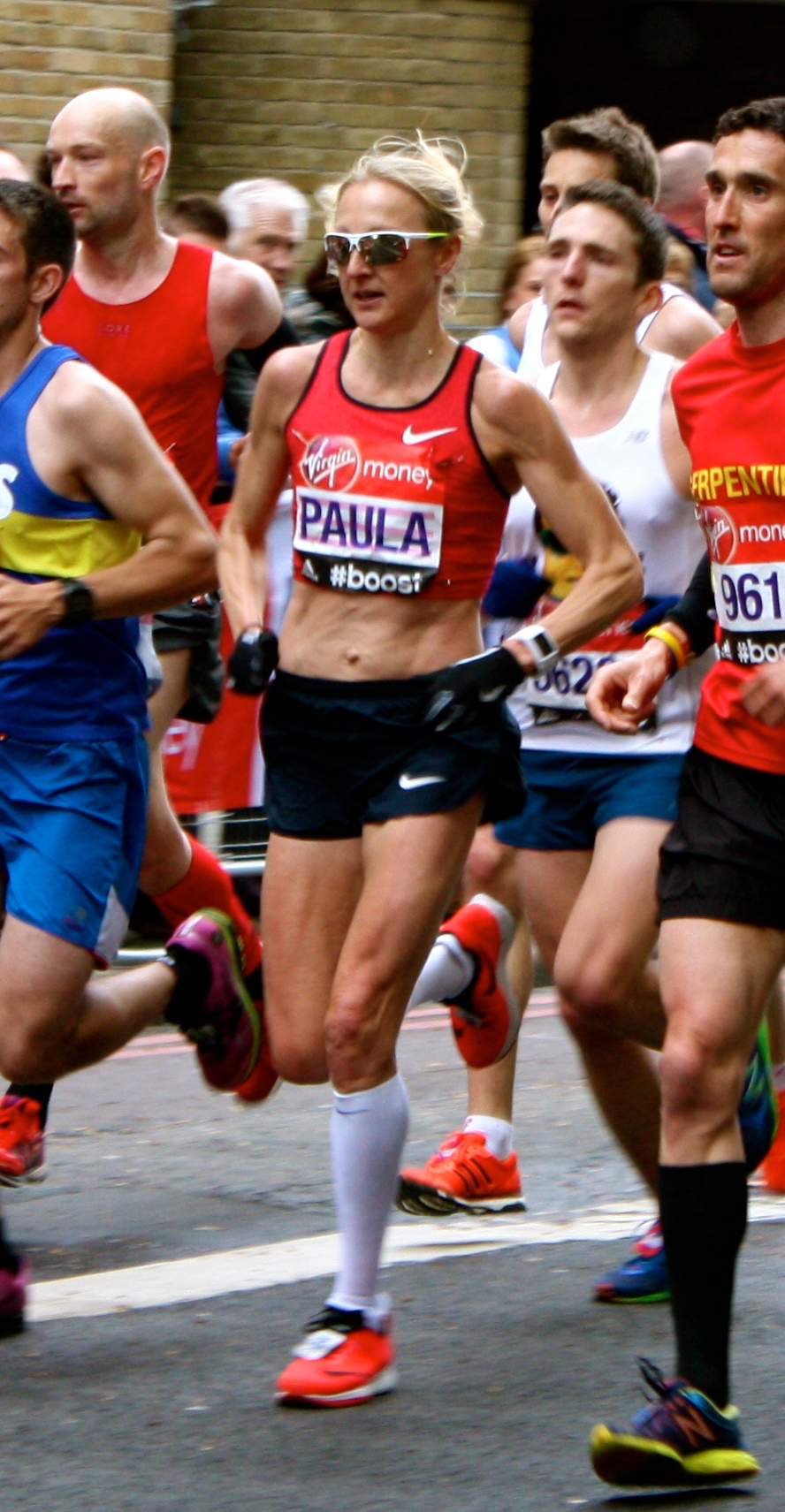
Radcliffe in the 2015 London Marathon

Following a 19-month layoff that included the birth of her second child, Radcliffe returned to action at the Bupa London 10 km (6 mi), where she finished third, 55 seconds behind the winner, Jo Pavey. Radcliffe called the performance "a bit of a disaster", and indicated she was suffering from a tear in one of the discs of her back.

Radcliffe set the 2011 Berlin Marathon as her comeback venue to try for an Olympic qualifying time. She came third in the race with a time of 2:23:46 — getting the Olympic standard and the fourth fastest time by a European that year. She was dissatisfied, however, saying: "I'm not particularly happy, either with my time or my place. I came here wanting to win". She used the 2012 Vienna Half Marathon to gauge her fitness and the race was set up as a battle between her and Haile Gebrselassie, with Radcliffe receiving a head start of 7:52 (the difference between the two athletes' personal bests). She did not perform well and was comfortably beaten by the Ethiopian, while she crossed the line with a time of 72:03.

Radcliffe pulled out of the 2012 Summer Olympics in London because of a foot injury. In January 2015, Radcliffe announced that she had decided to end her marathon career on 26 April 2015 by competing in the 2015 London Marathon. She finished in 2:36:55.

Radcliffe has served as a BBC pundit. During the 2024 Summer Olympics, she apologized for wishing volleyball player and convicted rapist Steven van de Velde good luck on the Tonight with Andrew Marr show.

In 2025, Radcliffe ran her first competitive marathon in a decade, finishing the 2025 Tokyo Marathon in 2:57:22. She also registered to run in the 2025 Boston Marathon. She finished with a time of 2:53:44, winning her category.

Radcliffe was appointed Officer of the Order of the British Empire (OBE) in the 2026 New Year Honours for services to sport.

== Other achievements and awards ==
- Awarded the BBC London Sports Awards 2003 for 'Sporting Moment of the Year'.
- Radcliffe has set numerous records, official and unofficial, on the track and the roads. As of November 2009, she holds the official world record for 10 km (6 mi) on roads. She has twice won the World Half-Marathon championships, twice the World Cross-Country championships (in 2001 and 2002), and in December 2003 became European Cross-Country champion for the second time, the only woman to have achieved this feat in the event's ten-year history.
- In 2004 Radcliffe joined with Jonathan Edwards on an Olympic Special Who Wants to Be a Millionaire?. The pair raised £64,000 for charity, half of that sum going to the British Olympic Association and a quarter of the sum going to Asthma UK.
- Nominated for the Sports Personality Award in 2007.
- Won the Laureus World Comeback of the Year award in early 2008 for her performances in 2007.
- Radcliffe won the Londoner of the Year award at the 2016 London Press Club awards despite being from Bedford.
- Radcliffe was made an Honorary Doctor of Technology (Hon DTech) by her alma mater, Loughborough University in 2002.

Radcliffe now works as a pundit and commentator of athletics events for the BBC. She appeared as a pundit for the Glasgow 2014 Commonwealth Games and Rio 2016 Olympics. Following the retirement of Brendan Foster, Radcliffe has combined punditry with commentating on the long-distance events at the Tokyo 2020 and Paris 2024 Olympics and at the Gold Coast 2018 and Birmingham 2022 Commonwealth Games.

== Anti-doping activity ==
Radcliffe has frequently made high-profile condemnations of the use of performance-enhancing drugs in athletics. Radcliffe and teammate Hayley Tullett caused controversy when, in the heats of the 5,000 metres at the 2001 World Athletics Championships in Edmonton, they held up a sign protesting against the reinstatement of Russian athlete Olga Yegorova after Yegorova had tested positive for the banned substance EPO. The sign was made by Radcliffe's husband and read 'EPO Cheats Out'. It was eventually taken off them by the stadium officials, but not before it was streamed around the world. After Radcliffe and Tullett's initial protest, teammates Kathy Butler and Hayley Yelling – who both missed out on a place in the final – protested alongside coaches Mark Rowland and Alan Storey, wearing Radcliffe masks and holding up banners with mocking slogans including one which read 'Free Paula'. Radcliffe vowed to continue her fight against drugs in sport after her high-profile actions in Edmonton. Since the 1999 European Cup, Radcliffe wears a red ribbon when competing to show her support for blood testing as a method of catching drug cheats.

"We should be pleased. One of the biggest frauds has been caught. Her medals should also be taken away"

— Radcliffe on Marion Jones in 2007.

Radcliffe has advocated a system where first time offenders are banned for four years and any future offence for life. However, she felt that in cases like that of Christine Ohuruogu, who missed three out-of-competition drugs tests, that she should be allowed to compete in the Olympics, as the BOA does not allow anyone who has served a doping ban to compete. However, when Ohuruogu admitted to not trying to get to the tests, Radcliffe expressed her disappointment and hoped that it was a lesson learned. When Marion Jones admitted to steroid use, Radcliffe stated that it was good for the sport that Jones was caught and that they had to keep testing and that people being caught is a big deterrent to would-be cheats.

In 2019, regarding guidelines for gender in sport, Radcliffe stated “right now, transgender women are not a threat to female sport, but you would be naive if you thought that, by not putting in any rules, it couldn't come to that at some point in the future. People will manipulate this if there is an opening there to make money and win medals and we've seen the lengths people go to, the lengths Russia went to cheat in sport.”

== Doping allegations ==
Reflecting upon the scepticism created by incidents of doping, she said "You have to accept the situation...it would be great if we could win the battle against doping and have testing that was 100 per-cent reliable, but I don't think that will happen in my competitive career." She has previously asked for the results of a blood test taken at the London Marathon to be made public, saying that she had "absolutely no objection to my test being released".

In 2015, in the wake of revelations of widespread doping in athletics, Radcliffe said that, unlike some other prominent British athletes, she would not be releasing her blood-test history, and discouraged other athletes from doing so. She was later indirectly identified as a suspected doper by MP Jesse Norman during a parliamentary inquiry into blood doping. In response, Radcliffe issued a statement in which she "categorically denied" cheating in any form and said she has "nothing to hide". Shortly afterwards, her three suspect test results were leaked, though Radcliffe still refused to release her complete blood-test history. In late November 2015, the IAAF declared that the accusations were "based on the gross misinterpretation of incomplete data". The UK Anti Doping Agency, having received Radcliffe's blood test history via the IAAF, stated that "UKAD has come to the same conclusion as the IAAF review that there is no case to answer".

== Personal life ==
Radcliffe was born to Peter and Pat Radcliffe and is the grandniece of 1920 Olympic silver medallist Charlotte Radcliffe. Radcliffe met her husband Gary Lough, a former Northern Irish 1,500 m runner, when he was her lodger at Loughborough University. The pair married in 2001. They have a daughter (born 2007) and a son (born 2010). The family resides in Monte Carlo.

== Major career achievements ==
=== Championships record ===
Year	Competition	Venue	Position	Event	Result
Representing Great Britain and England
1991	World Cross Country Championships	Antwerp, Belgium	15th	Junior cross country (4.435 km)	14:50
1992	World Cross Country Championships	Boston, United States	1st	Junior cross country (4.005 km)	13:30
1992	World Junior Championships	Seoul, South Korea	4th	3000 m	8:51.78
1993	World Cross Country Championships	Amorebieta, Spain	18th	Cross country (6.35 km)	20:34
1993	World Championships	Stuttgart, Germany	7th	3000 m	8:40.40
1995	World Cross Country Championships	Durham, United Kingdom	18th	Cross country (6.47 km)	21:14
1995	World Championships	Gothenburg, Sweden	5th	5000 m	14:57.02
1995	IAAF Grand Prix Final	Monaco	4th	3000 m	8:42.55
1996	World Cross Country Championships	Stellenbosch, South Africa	19th	Cross country (6.3 km)	21:13
1996	Olympic Games	Atlanta, United States	5th	5000 m	15:13.11
1996	IAAF Grand Prix Final	Milan, Italy	4th	5000 m	14:56.36
1997	World Cross Country Championships	Turin, Italy	2nd	Cross country (6.6 km)	20:55
1997	European Cup	Munich, Germany	3rd	3000 m	8:52.79
1997	World Championships	Athens, Greece	4th	5000 m	15:01.74
1997	IAAF Grand Prix Final	Fukuoka, Japan	3rd	5000 m	15:17.02
1998	World Cross Country Championships	Marrakesh, Morocco	2nd	Cross country (8 km)	25:42
1998	European Cup	Saint Petersburg, Russia	1st	5000 m	15:06.87
1998	European Championships	Budapest, Hungary	5th	10,000 m	31:36.51
1999	World Cross Country Championships	Belfast, United Kingdom	3rd	Cross country (8.012 km)	28:12
1999	European Cup	Paris, France	1st	5000 m	14:48.79
1999	World Championships	Seville, Spain	2nd	10,000 m	30:27.13
1999	IAAF Grand Prix Final	Munich, Germany	4th	3000 m	8:46.19
2000	World Cross Country Championships	Vilamoura, Portugal	4th	Short Cross Country (4.18 km)	13:01
2000	World Cross Country Championships	Vilamoura, Portugal	5th	Long Cross Country (8.08 km)	26:03
2000	Olympic Games	Sydney, Australia	4th	10,000 m	30:26.97
2001	World Cross Country Championships	Ostend, Belgium	2nd	Short Cross Country (4.1 km)	14:47
2001	World Cross Country Championships	Ostend, Belgium	1st	Long Cross Country (7.7 km)	27:49
2001	European Cup	Bremen, Germany	2nd	5000 m	14:49.84
2001	World Championships	Edmonton, Canada	4th	10,000 m	31:50.06
2002	World Cross Country Championships	Dublin, Ireland	1st	Long Cross Country (7.974 km)	26:55
2002	Commonwealth Games	Manchester, United Kingdom	1st	5000 m	14:31.42
2002	European Championships	Munich, Germany	1st	10,000 m	30:01.09
2004	European Cup	Bydgoszcz, Poland	1st	5000 m	14:29.11
2004	Olympic Games	Athens, Greece	—	Marathon	DNF
2004	Olympic Games	Athens, Greece	—	10,000 m	DNF
2005	World Championships	Helsinki, Finland	1st	Marathon	2:20:57
2008	Olympic Games	Beijing, China	23rd	Marathon	2:32:38

=== Road races ===
Year	Competition	Venue	Position	Notes
2000	World Half Marathon Championships	Veracruz, Mexico	1st	Half Marathon
2001	World Half Marathon Championships	Bristol, United Kingdom	1st	Half Marathon
2002	London Marathon	London, United Kingdom	1st	Marathon
2002	Chicago Marathon	Chicago, United States	1st	Marathon
2003	London Marathon	London, United Kingdom	1st	Marathon
2003	Great North Run	Tyne and Wear, United Kingdom	1st	Half marathon
2003	World Half Marathon Championships	Vilamoura, Portugal	1st	Half Marathon
2004	New York City Marathon	New York City, United States	1st	Marathon
2005	London Marathon	London, United Kingdom	1st	Marathon
2007	Great North Run	Tyne and Wear, United Kingdom	2nd	Half marathon
2007	New York City Marathon	New York, United States	1st	Marathon
2008	New York City Marathon	New York, United States	1st	Marathon
2009	New York City Half Marathon	New York, United States	1st	Half marathon
2009	New York City Marathon	New York, United States	4th	Marathon
2011	Berlin Marathon	Berlin, Germany	3rd	Marathon

== Personal bests ==
Surface	Event	Time	Date	Place	Extra
Track	400 m	58.9	1992		
Track	800 m	2:05.22	1995		
Track	1,000 m	2:47.17	1993		
Track	1500 m	4:05.37	1 July 2001	Glasgow, Scotland	
Track	1 Mile	4:24.94	14 August 1996	Zurich, Switzerland	
Track	2000 m	5:37.01+	29 August 1993	Sheffield, England	
Track	3000 m	8:22.20	19 July 2002	Monaco	British record
Track	2 Miles	9:17.4	23 May 1999	Loughborough, England	
Track	4000 m	11:35.21+			
Track	5000 m	14:29.11	20 June 2004	Bydgoszcz, Poland	British record
Track	10 000 m	30:01.09	6 August 2002	Munich, Germany	Ninth best ever
Road	5 km	14:57+	2 September 2001	London, England	
Road	4 Miles	19:51+			
Road	5 Miles	24:47+			
Road	8 km	24:05+			World best (non-IAAF distance)
Road	10 km	30:21	23 February 2003	San Juan, Puerto Rico	World record
Road	15 km	46:41+	7 October 2001	Bristol, England	British record (unofficial/downhill)
Road	10 Miles	50:01+	13 October 2002	Chicago, United States	World best (unratifiable/downhill)
Road	20 km	1:02.21+	21 September 2003	Newcastle-South Shields, England	World best (unratifiable/downhill)
Road	Half marathon	1:05:40	21 September 2003	Newcastle-South Shields, England	World best (unratifiable/downhill)
Road	25 km	1:20.36+	13 April 2003	London, England	
Road	30 km	1:36:36+	13 April 2003	London, England	World best (unratifiable)
Road	20 Miles	1:43:33+	13 April 2003	London, England	World best (unratifiable)
Road	Marathon	2:15:25	13 April 2003	London, England	World record

== Honours ==
=== Commonwealth honours ===
Commonwealth honours

Country	Date	Appointment	Post-nominal letters
United Kingdom	2002 Birthday Honours	Member of the Order of the British Empire	MBE
United Kingdom	2026 New Year Honours	Officer of the Order of the British Empire	OBE

=== Scholastic ===
University degrees

Location	Date	School	Degree
England	1996	Loughborough University	First-class honours Bachelor of Arts (BA) in Modern European Studies

Honorary Degrees

Location	Date	School	Degree	Gave Commencement Address
England	25 October 2001	De Montfort University	Doctorate	Yes
England	16 December 2002	Loughborough University	Doctor of Technology (D.Tech.)	Yes

=== Freedom of the City ===
- (England) 28 June 2004: Charnwood.

== Bibliography ==
- Radcliffe, Paula (2004). Paula: My Story So Far. With David Walsh. London: Simon & Schuster. ISBN 978-0-743-25242-3.

Records
Preceded by (Kenya) Catherine Ndereba	Women's Marathon World Record Holder; 13 October 2002 – 13 October 2019	Succeeded by (Kenya) Brigid Kosgei
Awards and achievements
Preceded by David Beckham	BBC Sports Personality of the Year; 2002	Succeeded by Jonny Wilkinson
Preceded by Stacy Dragila	Women's Track & Field Athlete of the Year; 2002	Succeeded by Hestrie Cloete
Preceded by Serena Williams	Gazzetta dello Sport; Sportswoman of the Year; 2002	Succeeded by Valentina Vezzali
Sporting positions
Preceded by Olga Yegorova	Women's 5,000 m Best Year Performance; 2002	Succeeded by Berhane Adere
Preceded by Catherine Ndereba; Yoko Shibui	Women's Fastest Marathon Race; 2002–2003; 2005	Succeeded by Yoko Shibui; Deena Kastor
