= 2003 London Marathon =

Road running event in London, England

23rd London Marathon
- Venue: London, United Kingdom
- Date: 13 April 2003

Champions
- Men: Gezahegne Abera (2:07:56)
- Women: Paula Radcliffe (2:15:25)
- Wheelchair men: Joël Jeannot (1:32:02)
- Wheelchair women: Francesca Porcellato (2:04:21)

The 2003 London Marathon was the 23rd running of the annual marathon race in London, United Kingdom, which took place on Sunday, 13 April. The elite men's race was won by Ethiopia's Gezahegne Abera in a time of 2:07:56 hours and the women's race was won by home athlete Paula Radcliffe in 2:15:25. Radcliffe's time was a marathon world record, improving on her own record by nearly two minutes.

In the wheelchair races, France's Joël Jeannot (1:32:02) and Italy's Francesca Porcellato (2:04:21) won the men's and women's divisions, respectively. Jeannot's winning time broke the previous course record by over three minutes.

A total of 111,000 people applied to enter the race (a record high): 45,629 had their applications accepted and 32,746 started the race. A total of 32,536 runners finished the race, including 7768 women.

== Results ==
=== Men ===
Position	Athlete	Nationality	Time
1st place, gold medalist(s)	Gezahegne Abera	Ethiopia	2:07:56
2nd place, silver medalist(s)	Stefano Baldini	Italy	2:07:56
3rd place, bronze medalist(s)	Joseph Ngolepus	Kenya	2:07:57
4	Paul Tergat	Kenya	2:07:59
5	Samson Ramadhani	Tanzania	2:08:01
6	Abdelkader El Mouaziz	Morocco	2:08:03
7	Lee Bong-ju	South Korea	2:08:10
8	Hendrick Ramaala	South Africa	2:08:58
9	Ian Syster	South Africa	2:09:18
10	Francisco Javier Cortés	Spain	2:10:39
11	Joseph Kahugu	Kenya	2:13:17
12	David Makori	Kenya	2:13:24
13	Ambesse Tolosa	Ethiopia	2:13:33
14	Onesmus Kilonzo	Kenya	2:13:56
15	Sisay Bezabeh	Australia	2:16:09
16	Chris Cariss	United Kingdom	2:17:57
17	Andrew Letherby	Australia	2:18:25
18	Huw Lobb	United Kingdom	2:18:30
19	Olivier Guery	France	2:18:56
20	Darran Bilton	United Kingdom	2:20:50
—	Róbert Štefko	Slovakia	DNF
—	Mohamed El Hattab	Morocco	DNF
—	Raymond Kipkoech	Kenya	DNF
—	Kim Yi-yong	South Korea	DNF
—	Cathal Lombard	Ireland	DNF
—	Joseph Kariuki	Kenya	DNF
—	Paulo Catarino	Portugal	DNF
—	Eliud Kimaiyo	Kenya	DNF
—	Richard Gardiner	United Kingdom	DNF

=== Women ===
Position	Athlete	Nationality	Time
1st place, gold medalist(s)	Paula Radcliffe	United Kingdom	2:15:25 WR
2nd place, silver medalist(s)	Catherine Ndereba	Kenya	2:19:55
3rd place, bronze medalist(s)	Deena Kastor	United States	2:21:16
4	Susan Chepkemei	Kenya	2:23:12
5	Lyudmila Petrova	Russia	2:23:14
6	Constantina Diță	Romania	2:23:43
7	Jeļena Prokopčuka	Latvia	2:24:01
8	Elfenesh Alemu	Ethiopia	2:24:56
9	Michaela Botezan	Romania	2:25:32
10	Derartu Tulu	Ethiopia	2:26:33
11	Larisa Zyuzko	Russia	2:28:05
12	Adriana Fernández	Mexico	2:29:54
13	Zinaida Semenova	Russia	2:32:37
14	Bruna Genovese	Italy	2:32:58
15	Rimma Pushkina	Russia	2:38:00
16	Michaela McCallum	United Kingdom	2:41:57
17	Karen Towler	United States	2:43:00
18	Alison Fletcher	United Kingdom	2:45:10
19	Jessica Petersson	Denmark	2:46:10
20	Margaret Angell	United States	2:46:20
—	Zola Pieterse	South Africa	DNF

=== Wheelchair men ===
Position	Athlete	Nationality	Time
1st place, gold medalist(s)	Joël Jeannot	France	1:32:02
2nd place, silver medalist(s)	David Weir	United Kingdom	1:34:48
3rd place, bronze medalist(s)	Denis Lemeunier	France	1:34:50
4	Charles Tolle	France	1:41:17
5	Tushar Patel	United Kingdom	1:42:56
6	Paul Nunnari	Australia	1:43:07
7	Kenny Herriot	United Kingdom	1:45:01
8	David Holding	United Kingdom	1:46:20
9	Kevin Papworth	United Kingdom	1:46:49
10	Ebbe Blichfeldt	Denmark	1:52:40

=== Wheelchair women ===
Position	Athlete	Nationality	Time
1st place, gold medalist(s)	Francesca Porcellato	Italy	2:04:21
2nd place, silver medalist(s)	Tanni Grey-Thompson	United Kingdom	2:04:54
3rd place, bronze medalist(s)	Paula Craig	United Kingdom	2:06:54
4	Rachel Potter	United Kingdom	2:12:16
5	Deborah Brennan	United Kingdom	2:17:32
