= Sue Harrison (runner) =

British long-distance runner

Sue Harrison (born 6 August 1971 in Royal Leamington Spa, England) is a British international long distance athlete.

Harrison joined her local club Leamington C&AC in 1986, firstly as a cross country runner, a discipline she first represented England at in 1993.
