= Süreyya Ayhan =

Turkish middle-distance runner (born 1978)

Süreyya Ayhan Kop
Personal information
- Born: September 6, 1978 (age 48) Çankırı, Turkey
- Height: 1.63 m (5 ft 4 in)
- Weight: 52 kg (115 lb)

Sport
- Sport: Running
Medal record
Representing Turkey
Women's athletics
World Championships
Silver medal – second place	2003 Paris	1500 m
European Championships
Gold medal – first place	2002 Munich	1500 m
IAAF World Cup
Gold medal – first place	2002 Madrid	1500 m
Universiade
Gold medal – first place	2001 Beijing	1500 m
Mediterranean Games
Silver medal – second place	2001 Tunis	1500 m

Süreyya Ayhan Kop (born September 6, 1978) is a Turkish former female middle distance track runner who specialised in the 1500 metres. In November 2009, she was banned for life by the Court of Arbitration for Sport (CAS) due to her second anti-doping rule violation.

Ayhan ran for the sports clubs MTA Ankara and Fenerbahçe Istanbul. She then joined the Gaziantep Metropolitan Municipality Sports Club. She holds Turkish records in 800 m (2:00.64) and 1500 m (3:55.33). She became the first Turkish woman ever to reach an Olympic semi-final during her participation in the 2000 Summer Olympics in Sydney, Australia. The next year, she became the first Turkish woman to reach a World Championship final. She was the best European woman athlete running 1500 m in two consecutive years 2002 and 2003.

In 2007, Ayhan was served with a lifetime competition ban due to violating anti-doping regulations.

== Athletics career ==
=== Early career ===
Ayhan's father is a former amateur athlete, a local cross-country runner. He was a role model and supporter for Süreyya when she started athletics in the junior high school. In 1992, she started running competitively. She graduated from the Kahramanmaraş Sütçü İmam Üniversitesi in sport and physical education.

Born in Korgun, Çankırı, she established herself as Turkey's top 1500 m runner with a win at the 1999 national championships, setting a Turkish record. The following year she became the country's first female semi-finalist at the Olympic Games. She reached the final of the 2001 World Championships in Athletics (another first for Turkish female athletes), became the Universiade 1500 m champion and won a silver at the 2001 Mediterranean Games.

=== World-class breakthrough ===
In 2002, she won Turkey's first gold medal in a European Championships by out-sprinting World and Olympics champion Gabriela Szabo from Romania for the 1500 m title 2 seconds ahead with 3:58.79, leading from the gun to the finish. She improved further in 2003, taking two seconds off her personal best winning a silver medal in the 1500 m final of the 2003 World Championships.

== Doping ban ==
Ayhan, one of Turkey's best hopes for a gold medal at the 2004 Athens Olympics, withdrew from the games due to an injured tendon during a training in Germany.

Allegations that Ayhan may have attempted to cheat on a pre-Olympic doping test surfaced in August, after testers reportedly complained of being obstructed from carrying out their work. She was cleared of doping allegations by the IAAF, but she violated rules while taking her test. IAAF ruled that Ayhan had not taken performance-enhancing drugs, but said the athlete had broken testing rules, and she was banned for two years.

She returned to competition but failed another test while she was training in the United States in November 2007, this time after her sample tested positive for the steroids stanozolol and methandienone metabolites. This second offence meant she received a lifetime ban from the sport, but she contested the ruling, taking the case to the Court of Arbitration for Sport (CAS). The Turkish Court of Arbitration for Sport reduced her ban to four years. Ayhan took the banning to the CAS in Lausanne, however the international court reversed the decision in November 2009, upholding the lifetime ban.

== Dedications ==
On May 26, 2003, The Turkish Mint issued a 925 silver commemoration coin worth of 10 US dollars in honor of her.

== Personal bests ==
Event	Time (min)	Venue	Date
800 metres	2:00.64	Istanbul, Turkey	August 20, 2000
1500 metres	3:55.33	Brussels, Belgium	September 5, 2003

=== Progression ===
1500 m best
Season	Time (min)	Venue	Date
2003	3:55:33	Brussels, Belgium	September 5, 2003
2002	3:57:75	Brussels, Belgium	August 30, 2002
2001	4:06.91	Beijing, China	August 29, 2001
2000	4:03:02	Brussels, Belgium	August 25, 2000
1999	4:14:80	İzmir, Turkey	May 12, 1999

== National titles ==
- Turkish Athletics Championships
  - 1500 m: 1999
- Turkish Clubs Athletics Championships
  - 800 m: 2000

== International competitions ==
Year	Competition	Venue	Position	Event	Notes
Representing Turkey
1995	European Champion Clubs Cup	Paris, France	2nd	1500 m	4:37:23
1996	European Champion Clubs Cup	San Donato Milanese, Italy	2nd	1500 m	
1998	Balkan Athletics Indoor Championships	Piraeus, Greece	2nd	1500 m	4:31:13
1999	European U23 Championships	Gothenburg, Sweden	13th (h)	1500m	4:20.28
2000	Balkan Athletics Indoor Championships	Pireaus, Greece	2nd	1500 m	4:05:53 NR
2000	Olympic Games	Sydney, Australia	8th (semis)	1500 m	4:09:42
2001	Universiade	Beijing, China	1st	1500 m	4:06:91
2001	Mediterranean Games	Tunis, Tunisia	2nd	1500 m	4:10:69
2001	World Championships	Edmonton, Canada	8th	1500 m	4:08:17
2002	European Championships	Munich, Germany	1st	1500 m	3:58:79 CR NR
2002	IAAF World Cup	Madrid, Spain	1st	1500 m	4:02:57
2003	European Cup Second League	Istanbul, Turkey	1st	1500 m	4:06:63
2003	World Championships	Paris, France	2nd	1500 m	3:59:04
2003	World Athletics Final	Monaco	1st	1500 m	3:57:72

== Circuit wins ==
- Turkish Stars Indoor Championship 800 m: 1993 (2:18 NR)
- Israeli Championships 1500 m: 1996, 1997
- Memorial Van Damme 1500 m: 2002 (3:57:75 NR), 2003 (3:55:33 NR)
- ISTAF 1500 m: 2002, 2003
- Weltklasse Zürich 1500 m: 2003 (3:55:60 NR)

== See also ==
- List of sportspeople sanctioned for doping offences
- Turkish women in sports

Awards
Preceded by Stephanie Graf	Women's European Athlete of the Year; 2002	Succeeded by Carolina Klüft
