= 2002 in the sport of athletics =

2002 in athletics
- Major world events: World Championships; World Indoor Championships
- IAAF Athletes of the Year: Hicham El Guerrouj; Paula Radcliffe

This article contains an overview of the sport of athletics, including track and field, cross country and road running, in the year 2002.

There was no primary championships that season, although continental championships were held in Africa, Asia and Europe. The foremost athletics competitions at games events occurred at the 2002 Commonwealth Games, the 2002 Asian Games and the 2002 CAC Games. The 2002 IAAF World Cup was the major global outdoor track and field event.

Paula Radcliffe was among the season's top performers, having set world records at the London and Chicago Marathons, as well becoming European and Commonwealth champion on the track.

== Major events ==
=== World ===
- World Cross Country Championships
- IAAF World Cup
- World Half Marathon Championships
- World Race Walking Cup
- World Junior Championships in Athletics
- Grand Prix Final
- IAAF Golden League
- World Marathon Majors
- Commonwealth Games

=== Regional ===
- African Championships
- Asian Championships
- Asian Junior Championships
- Asian Games
- Balkan Games
- Central American and Caribbean Games
- European Athletics Championships
- European Cross Country Championships
- European Mountain Running Championships
- European Cup
- Ibero-American Championships
- Micronesian Games
- Oceania Athletics Championships
- Oceania Cross Country Championships
- South American Games
- South American U23 Championships
- South American Cross Country Championships
- West Asian Games

=== National ===
- 2002 Lithuanian Athletics Championships

== World records ==
=== Men ===
  None in 2002

=== Women ===
Event	Athlete	Nation	Performance	Meeting	Place	Date
3000 m steeplechase	Justyna Bak	Poland	9:22.29		Milan, Italy	5 June
3000 m steeplechase	Alesya Turova	Belarus	9:21.72		Ostrava, Czech Republic	12 June
3000 m steeplechase	Alesya Turova	Belarus	9:16.51		Gdańsk, Poland	27 July

== Awards ==
=== Men ===
2002 TRACK & FIELD AWARDS	WINNER
IAAF World Athlete of the Year	Hicham El Guerrouj (MAR)
Track & Field Athlete of the Year	Hicham El Guerrouj (MAR)
European Athlete of the Year Award	Dwain Chambers (GBR)
Best Male Track Athlete ESPY Award	Maurice Greene (USA)

=== Women ===
2002 TRACK & FIELD AWARDS	WINNER
IAAF World Athlete of the Year	Paula Radcliffe (GBR)
Track & Field Athlete of the Year	Paula Radcliffe (GBR)
European Athlete of the Year Award	Süreyya Ayhan (TUR)
Best Female Track Athlete ESPY Award	Marion Jones (USA)

== Men's Best Year Performances ==
=== 400m Hurdles ===
RANK	2002 WORLD BEST PERFORMERS	TIME
1.	Félix Sánchez (DOM)	47.35
2.	James Carter (USA)	47.57
3.	Stéphane Diagana (FRA)	47.58
4.	Llewellyn Herbert (RSA)	48.02
5.	Hadi Soua'an Al-Somaily (KSA)	48.11

=== 3,000m Steeplechase ===
RANK	2002 WORLD BEST PERFORMERS	TIME
1.	Brahim Boulami (MAR)	7:58.09
2.	Stephen Cherono (KEN)	7:58.10
3.	Wilson Boit Kipketer (KEN)	8:00.56
4.	Paul Kipsiele Koech (KEN)	8:05.44
5.	Reuben Kosgei (KEN)	8:05.87

=== Pole Vault ===
RANK	2002 WORLD BEST PERFORMERS	HEIGHT
1.	Jeff Hartwig (USA)	5.90 m
1.	Tim Lobinger (GER)	5.90 m
3.	Lars Börgeling (GER)	5.85 m
3.	Aleksandr Averbukh (ISR)	5.85 m
3.	Patrik Kristiansson (SWE)	5.85 m

== Women's Best Year Performances ==
=== 100 metres ===
RANK	2002 WORLD BEST PERFORMERS	TIME
1.	Zhanna Block (UKR)	10.83
2.	Debbie Ferguson (BAH)	10.91
3.	Tayna Lawrence (JAM)	10.93
4.	Chryste Gaines (USA)	10.94
5.	Muriel Hurtis-Houairi (FRA)	10.96

=== 200 metres ===
RANK	2002 WORLD BEST PERFORMERS	TIME
1.	Debbie Ferguson (BAH)	22.20
2.	Zhanna Block (UKR)	22.24
3.	Veronica Campbell (JAM)	22.39
4.	Muriel Hurtis-Houairi (FRA)	22.43
5.	Stephanie Durst (USA)	22.48

=== Half Marathon ===
RANK	2002 WORLD BEST PERFORMERS	TIME
1.	Sonia O'Sullivan (IRL)	1:07:19

=== 100m Hurdles ===
RANK	2002 WORLD BEST PERFORMERS	TIME
1.	Gail Devers (USA)	12.40
2.	Brigitte Foster-Hylton (JAM)	12.49
3.	Miesha McKelvy (USA)	12.60
3.	Glory Alozie (ESP)	12.60
5.	Anjanette Kirkland (USA)	12.62

=== 400m Hurdles ===
RANK	2002 WORLD BEST PERFORMERS	TIME
1.	Yuliya Pechonkina (RUS)	53.10
2.	Jana Rawlinson (AUS)	54.14
3.	Tetyana Tereshchuk-Antipova (UKR)	54.28
4.	Sandra Glover (USA)	54.40
5.	Surita Febbraio (RSA)	54.45

=== 3,000m Steeplechase ===
RANK	2002 WORLD BEST PERFORMERS	TIME
1.	Alesya Turova (BLR)	9:16.51
2.	Justyna Bak (POL)	9:22.29
3.	Élodie Olivarès (FRA)	9:33.12
4.	Cristina Casandra (ROM)	9:33.16
5.	Melanie Schulz (GER)	9:38.31

=== High Jump ===
RANK	2002 WORLD BEST PERFORMERS	HEIGHT
1.	Kajsa Bergqvist (SWE)	2.05 m
2.	Hestrie Cloete (RSA)	2.02 m
3.	Iryna Mykhalchenko (UKR)	2.00 m
3.	Viktoria Seryogina (RUS)	2.00 m
3.	Marina Kuptsova (RUS)	2.00 m

=== Pole Vault ===
RANK	2002 WORLD BEST PERFORMERS	HEIGHT
1.	Svetlana Feofanova (RUS)	4.78 m
2.	Annika Becker (GER)	4.77 m
3.	Stacy Dragila (USA)	4.72 m
4.	Mary Vincent (USA)	4.65 m
5.	Yvonne Buschbaum (GER)	4.65 m

=== Heptathlon ===
RANK	2002 WORLD BEST PERFORMERS	POINTS
1.	Carolina Klüft (SWE)	6542
2.	Sabine Braun (GER)	6434
3.	Shelia Burrell (USA)	6363
4.	Natalya Sazanovich (BLR)	6341
5.	Austra Skujyté (LTU)	6275

== Marathon ==
=== Men's competition ===
==== Commonwealth Games ====
RANK	ATHLETE	TIME
	Francis Naali (TAN)	2:11:58
	Joshua Chelanga (KEN)	2:12:44
	Andrew Letherby (AUS)	2:13:23
4.	Erick Wainaina (KEN)	2:13:27
5.	Luketz Swartbooi (NAM)	2:13:40
6.	Jonathan Wyatt (NZL)	2:14:20
7.	Lee Troop (AUS)	2:16:44
8.	Josiah Bembe (RSA)	2:18:16
9.	Shaun Creighton (AUS)	2:18:19
10.	Dominic Bannister (ENG)	2:19:31

=== Women's competition ===
==== Commonwealth Games ====
RANK	ATHLETE	TIME
	Kerryn McCann (AUS)	2:30:05
	Krishna Stanton (AUS)	2:34:52
	Jackie Gallagher (AUS)	2:36:37
4.	Debbie Robinson (ENG)	2:39:42
5.	Teresa McCluskey (NIR)	2:40:29
6.	Bev Hartigan (ENG)	2:41:27
7.	Carol Galea (MLT)	2:45:48
8.	Marian Sutton (ENG)	2:45:55
9.	Beata Naigambo (NAM)	2:47:22
10.	Elizabeth Mongudhi (NAM)	2:49:19

== Deaths ==
- March 7 — Franziska Rochat-Moser (35), Swiss long-distance runner
- March 22 — Marcel Hansenne (85), French middle-distance runner
- March 27 — Tadeusz Rut (70), Polish hammer thrower
- May 26 — Mamo Wolde (69), Ethiopian runner
- June 17 — Willie Davenport (59), American hurdler
- June 20 — Tinus Osendarp (86), Dutch athlete
- August 1 — Theo Bruce (79), Australian long jumper
- August 12 — Knud Lundberg (82), Danish multi-talented sportsman
- August 31 — Joe McCluskey (91), American athlete
- September 18 — Bob Hayes (59), American sprinter and American football player
- November 15 — Sohn Kee-Chung (90), Korean marathoner
- November 18 — Kim Gallagher (38), American athlete
