= 1996 in the sport of athletics =

1996 in athletics
- Major world events: Olympic Games
- IAAF Athletes of the Year: Michael Johnson; Svetlana Masterkova

This article contains an overview of the year 1996 in athletics.

== Major events ==
=== World ===
- Olympic Games
- Summer Paralympics
- World Cross Country Championships
- World Half Marathon Championships
- Grand Prix Final
- World Junior Championships

=== Regional ===
- African Championships
- CARIFTA Games
- Central American and Caribbean Junior Championships
- European Indoor Championships
- European Cross Country Championships
- Ibero-American Championships
- South American Junior Championships
- South American Youth Championships

== World records ==
=== Men ===
Event	Athlete	Nation	Performance	Meeting	Place	Date
100 m	Donovan Bailey	Canada	9.84	Olympic Games	Atlanta, United States	27 July
200 m	Michael Johnson	United States	19.66	US Olympic Trials	Atlanta, United States	23 June
200 m	Michael Johnson	United States	19.32	Olympic Games	Atlanta, United States	1 August
3000 m	Daniel Komen	Kenya	7:20.67	Rieti Meeting	Rieti, Italy	1 September
10,000 m	Salah Hissou	Morocco	26:38.08	Memorial Van Damme	Brussels, Belgium	23 August
Javelin throw	Jan Železný	Czech Republic	98.48 m		Jena, Germany	1 September

=== Women ===
Event	Athlete	Nation	Performance	Meeting	Place	Date
1000 m	Svetlana Masterkova	Russia	2:28.98	Memorial Van Damme	Brussels, Belgium	23 August
Mile	Svetlana Masterkova	Russia	4:12.56		Zürich, Switzerland	14 August
3000 m steeplechase	Courtney Meldrum	United States	10:23.47	US Olympic Trials	Atlanta, United States	23 June
Pole vault	Emma George	Australia	4.30 m		Perth, Australia	28 January
Pole vault	Emma George	Australia	4.41 m		Perth, Australia	28 January
Pole vault	Emma George	Australia	4.42 m		Reims, France	29 June
Pole vault	Emma George	Australia	4.45 m		Sapporo, Japan	14 July
Hammer throw	Olga Kuzenkova	Russia	68.20 m		Sydney, Australia	8 February
Hammer throw	Olga Kuzenkova	Russia	69.46 m		Sydney, Australia	17 February

- note that records for the women's 3000 m steeplechase were not officially recognised until 2000

== Awards ==
=== Men ===
1996 TRACK & FIELD AWARDS	ATHLETE
IAAF World Athlete of the Year	Michael Johnson (USA)
Track & Field Athlete of the Year	Michael Johnson (USA)
European Athlete of the Year Award	Jan Železný (CZE)
Best Male Track Athlete ESPY Award	Michael Johnson (USA)

=== Women ===
1996 TRACK & FIELD AWARDS	ATHLETE
IAAF World Athlete of the Year	Svetlana Masterkova (RUS)
Track & Field Athlete of the Year	Svetlana Masterkova (RUS)
European Athlete of the Year Award	Svetlana Masterkova (RUS)
Best Female Track Athlete ESPY Award	Kim Batten (USA)

== Season's bests ==
Best marks of the year
Event	Men			Women		
Event	Athlete	Mark	Notes	Athlete	Mark	Notes
100 metres	Donovan Bailey (CAN)	9.84	WR	Merlene Ottey (JAM)	10.74	
200 metres	Michael Johnson (USA)	19.32	WR	Marie-José Pérec (FRA) Mary Onyali (NGR)	22.07	
400 metres	Michael Johnson (USA)	43.44		Marie-José Pérec (FRA)	48.25	
800 metres	Wilson Kipketer (DEN)	1:41.83		Svetlana Masterkova (RUS)	1:56.04	
1500 metres	Hicham El Guerrouj (MAR)	3:29.05		Svetlana Masterkova (RUS)	3:56.77	
3000 metres	Daniel Komen (KEN)	7:20.67	WR	Sonia O'Sullivan (IRL)	8:35.42	
5000 metres	Daniel Komen (KEN)	12:45.09		Fernanda Ribeiro (POR)	14:41.07	
10,000 metres	Salah Hissou (MAR)	26:38.08	WR	Fernanda Ribeiro (POR)	31:01.63	
100/110 metres hurdles	Allen Johnson (USA)	12.92		Ludmila Engquist (SWE)	12.47	
400 metres hurdles	Derrick Adkins (USA)	47.54		Deon Hemmings (JAM)	52.82	
3000 metres steeplechase	John Kosgei (KEN)	8:05.68		Courtney Meldrum (USA)	10:23.47	WR
Pole vault	Sergei Bubka (UKR)	6.02 m		Emma George (AUS)	4.45 m	WR
High jump	Charles Austin (USA)	2.39 m		Stefka Kostadinova (BUL)	2.05 m	
Long jump	Erick Walder (USA)	8.58 m		Jackie Joyner-Kersee (USA)	7.20 m	
Triple jump	Kenny Harrison (USA)	18.09 m		Inessa Kravets (UKR)	15.33 m	
Shot put	Randy Barnes (USA)	22.40 m		Astrid Kumbernuss (GER)	20.97 m	
Discus throw	Anthony Washington (USA)	71.14 m		Ilke Wyludda (GER)	69.66 m	
Javelin throw	Jan Železný (CZE)	98.48 m	WR	Steffi Nerius (GER)	69.42 m	
Hammer throw	Lance Deal (USA)	82.52 m		Olga Kuzenkova (RUS)	69.46 m	WR
Heptathlon	—			Ghada Shouaa (SYR)	6942 pts	
Decathlon	Dan O'Brien (USA)	8824 pts		—		
4 × 100 metres relay	Canada; Robert Esmie; Glenroy Gilbert; Bruny Surin; Donovan Bailey	37.69		United States; Chryste Gaines; Gail Devers; Inger Miller; Gwen Torrence	41.95	
4 × 400 metres relay	United States; LaMont Smith; Alvin Harrison; Derek Mills; Anthuan Maybank	2:55.99		United States; Rochelle Stevens; Maicel Malone; Kim Graham; Jearl Miles Clark	3:20.91	
