= Best Track and Field Athlete ESPY Award =

Annual athletic award (2007–2012)

The Best Track and Field Athlete ESPY Award was presented from 2007 to 2012, with the exception of 2009, to the track and field athlete, irrespective of nationality or gender, adjudged to be the best in a given calendar year. The award supersedes the Best Female Track Athlete ESPY Award and Best Male Track Athlete ESPY Award.

== List of winners ==
Year	Athlete	Nation represented	Event(s) contested
2007	Jeremy Wariner	United States	400 metres, 4 x 400-metre relay
2008	Tyson Gay	United States	100 metres, 200 metres, 4 x 100 metres relay
2009	No award presented		
2010	Usain Bolt	Jamaica	100 metres, 200 metres, 4 x 100 metres relay
2011	Tyson Gay	United States	100 metres, 200 metres, 4 x 100 metres relay
2012	Walter Dix	United States	100 metres, 200 metres

== See also ==
- Best Female Track Athlete ESPY Award
- Best Male Track Athlete ESPY Award
- European Athlete of the Year Award
- IAAF Athlete of the Year Award
- IAAF Golden League
