= 1999 in the sport of athletics =

1999 in athletics
- Major world events: World Championships; World Indoor Championships
- IAAF Athletes of the Year: Michael Johnson; Gabriela Szabo

This page shows the main events during the 1999 year in the sport of athletics throughout the world.

== International Events ==
- All-Africa Games
- Balkan Games
- Central American and Caribbean Championships
- Pan American Games
- Pan Arab Games
- South American Championships
- World Championships
- World Cross Country Championships
- World Indoor Championships
- World Student Games

== World records ==
=== Men ===
Event	Athlete	Nation	Performance	Meeting	Place	Date
100 metres	Maurice Greene	United States	9.79		Athens, Greece	16 June
400 metres	Michael Johnson	United States	43.18		Seville, Spain	26 August
1000 metres	Noah Ngeny	Kenya	2:11.96		Rieti, Italy	5 September
Mile	Hicham El Guerrouj	Morocco	3:43.13		Rome, Italy	7 July
2,000 metres	Hicham El Guerrouj	Morocco	4:44.79		Berlin, Germany	7 September
Decathlon	Tomáš Dvořák	Czech Republic	8,994		(Czech Republic) Prague, Czech republic	3-4 July

=== Women ===
Event	Athlete	Nation	Performance	Meeting	Place	Date
3000 m steeplechase	Yelena Motalova	Russia	9:48.88		Tula, Russia	31 July
Pole vault	Emma George	Australia	4.60 m		(Australia) Sydney, AUS	20 February
Pole vault	Stacy Dragila	United States	4.60 m		Seville, Spain	21 August

== Awards ==
=== Men ===
1999 TRACK & FIELD AWARDS	ATHLETE
IAAF World Athlete of the Year	Michael Johnson (USA)
Track & Field Athlete of the Year	Hicham El Guerrouj (MAR)
European Athlete of the Year Award	Tomáš Dvořák (CZE)
Best Male Track Athlete ESPY Award	Maurice Greene (USA)

=== Women ===
1999 TRACK & FIELD AWARDS	ATHLETE
IAAF World Athlete of the Year	Gabriela Szabo (ROM)
Track & Field Athlete of the Year	Gabriela Szabo (ROM)
European Athlete of the Year Award	Gabriela Szabo (ROM)
Best Female Track Athlete ESPY Award	Marion Jones (USA)

== Men's Best Year Performances ==
=== 400m hurdles ===
RANK	1999 WORLD BEST PERFORMERS	TIME
1.	Fabrizio Mori (ITA)	47.72
2.	Llewellyn Herbert (RSA)	47.83
3.	Samuel Matete (ZAM)	47.91
4.	Stéphane Diagana (FRA)	48.12
5.	Marcel Schelbert (SUI)	48.13
5.	Eronilde de Araújo (BRA)	48.13

=== 3,000m steeplechase ===
RANK	1999 WORLD BEST PERFORMERS	TIME
1.	Bernard Barmasai (KEN)	7:58.98
2.	Christopher Kosgei (KEN)	8:05.43
3.	Ali Ezzine (MAR)	8:06.70
4.	Wilson Boit Kipketer (KEN)	8:07.10
5.	Paul Kosgei (KEN)	8:07.13

=== Pole vault ===
RANK	1999 WORLD BEST PERFORMERS	HEIGHT
1.	Maksim Tarasov (RUS)	6.05 m
2.	Jeff Hartwig (USA)	6.02 m
3.	Tim Lobinger (GER)	6.00 m
4.	Jean Galfione (FRA)	5.98 m
5.	Dmitriy Markov (AUS)	5.95 m

== Women's Best Year Performances ==
=== 60 metres ===
RANK	1999 WORLD BEST PERFORMERS	TIME
1.	Ekateríni Thánou (GRE)	6.96
2.	Gail Devers (USA)	6.98
3.	Merlene Ottey (JAM)	7.01
4.	Savatheda Fynes (BAH)	7.01
5.	Philomena Mensah (CAN)	7.02

=== 100 metres ===
RANK	1999 WORLD BEST PERFORMERS	TIME
1.	Marion Jones (USA)	10.70
2.	Inger Miller (USA)	10.79
3.	Ekateríni Thánou (GRE)	10.83
4.	Glory Alozie (NGR)	10.90
5.	Savatheda Fynes (BAH)	10.91

=== 200 metres ===
RANK	1999 WORLD BEST PERFORMERS	TIME
1.	Inger Miller (USA)	21.77
2.	Marion Jones (USA)	21.81
3.	Merlene Frazer (JAM)	22.18
4.	Debbie Ferguson (BAH)	22.19
5.	Beverly McDonald (JAM)	22.22

=== Half marathon ===
RANK	1999 WORLD BEST PERFORMERS	TIME
1.	Elana Meyer (RSA)	1:06:44

=== 60 metres ===
RANK	1999 WORLD BEST PERFORMERS	TIME
1.	Brigita Bukovec (SVN)	7.78
2.	Glory Alozie (NGR)	7,82
3.	Olga Shishigina (KAZ)	7.82
4.	Melissa Morrison (USA)	7.85
5.	Katie Anderson (CAN)	7.90

=== 100m hurdles ===
RANK	1999 WORLD BEST PERFORMERS	TIME
1.	Gail Devers (USA)	12.37
2.	Glory Alozie (NGR)	12.44
3.	Olga Shishigina (KAZ)	12.47
—	Ludmila Engquist (SWE)	12.47
5.	Katie Anderson (CAN)	12.61

=== 400m hurdles ===
RANK	1999 WORLD BEST PERFORMERS	TIME
1.	Daimí Pernía (CUB)	52.89
2.	Nezha Bidouane (MAR)	52.90
3.	Deon Hemmings (JAM)	53.16
4.	Ionela Târlea (ROM)	53.25
5.	Andrea Blackett (BAR)	53.36

=== 3,000m steeplechase ===
RANK	1999 WORLD BEST PERFORMERS	TIME
1.	Yelena Motalova (RUS)	9:48.88
2.	Laurence Duquénoy (FRA)	9:55.69
3.	Daniela Petrescu (ROM)	9:58.44
4.	Justyna Bąk (POL)	9:58.77
5.	Alina Cucerzan (ROM)	10:03.68

=== High jump ===
RANK	1999 WORLD BEST PERFORMERS	HEIGHT
1.	Hestrie Cloete (RSA)	2.04 m
2.	Monica Iagăr (ROM)	2.01 m
2.	Yelena Yelesina (RUS)	2.01 m
2.	Inga Babakova (UKR)	2.01 m
5.	Tisha Waller (USA)	2.00 m

=== Shot put ===
RANK	1999 WORLD BEST PERFORMERS	DISTANCE
1.	Svetlana Krivelyova (RUS)	20.26 m
2.	Yelena Ivanenko (BLR)	19.13 m
3.	Yuliya Zaginay (RUS)	19.06 m
4.	Tressa Thompson (USA)	18.88 m

=== Pole vault ===
RANK	1999 WORLD BEST PERFORMERS	HEIGHT
1.	Emma George (AUS)	4.60 m
1.	Stacy Dragila (USA)	4.60 m
3.	Anzhela Balakhonova (UKR)	4.55 m
4.	Tatiana Grigorieva (AUS)	4.50 m
5.	Yelena Belyakova (RUS)	4.46 m

=== Heptathlon ===
RANK	1999 WORLD BEST PERFORMERS	POINTS
1.	Eunice Barber (FRA)	6861
2.	Denise Lewis (GBR)	6724
3.	DeDee Nathan (USA)	6577
4.	Ghada Shouaa (SYR)	6500
5.	Sabine Braun (GER)	6497

== Marathon ==
=== Men's competition ===
==== Pan American Games ====
RANK	ATHLETE	TIME
	Vanderlei de Lima (BRA)	2:17:20
	Raúl Maza (VEN)	2:19:56
	Éder Fialho (BRA)	2:20:09

==== Best Year Performances ====
RANK	NAME ATHLETE	TIME	EVENT
1.	Khalid Khannouchi (MAR)	2:05:42	Chicago Marathon
2.	Moses Tanui (KEN)	2:06:16	Chicago Marathon
3.	Gert Thys (RSA)	2:06:33	Tokyo Marathon
4.	Josephat Kiprono (KEN)	2:06:44	Berlin Marathon
5.	Fred Kiprop (KEN)	2:06:46	Amsterdam Marathon
6.	Tesfaye Jifar (ETH)	2:06:48	Amsterdam Marathon
7.	William Kiplagat (KEN)	2:06:49	Amsterdam Marathon
8.	Tesfaye Tola (ETH)	2:06:56	Amsterdam Marathon
9.	Takayuki Inubushi (JPN)	2:06:57	Berlin Marathon
10.	Japhet Kosgei (KEN)	2:07:09	Rotterdam Marathon

=== Women's competition ===
==== Pan American Games ====
RANK	ATHLETE	TIME
	Érika Olivera (CHI)	2:37:41
	Iglandini González (COL)	2:40:06
	Viviany Anderson (BRA)	2:40:55

==== Best Year Performances ====
RANK	NAME ATHLETE	TIME	EVENT
1.	Tegla Loroupe (KEN)	2:20:43	Berlin Marathon
2.	Eri Yamaguchi (JPN)	2:22:12	Tokyo Marathon
3.	Tegla Loroupe (KEN)	2:22:48	Rotterdam Marathon
4.	Joyce Chepchumba (KEN)	2:23:22	London Marathon
5.	Lidia Șimon (ROM)	2:23:24	Osaka International Ladies Marathon
6.	Fatuma Roba (ETH)	2:23:25	Boston Marathon
7.	Tegla Loroupe (KEN)	2:23:46	Osaka International Ladies Marathon
8.	Marleen Renders (BEL)	2:23:58	Berlin Marathon
9.	Adriana Fernández (MEX)	2:24:06	London Marathon
10.	Katrin Dörre (GER)	2:24:35	Hamburg Marathon

== Deaths ==
- January 5 — Jarmila Nygrýnová (45), Czech long jumper (b. 1953)
- January 9 — James Peters (80), English long-distance runner (b. 1918)
- January 28 — Josef Doležal (78), Czechoslovak race walker (b. 1920)
- February 3 — Mikko Hietanen (87), Finnish long-distance runner (b. 1911)
- May 17 — João Carlos de Oliveira (44), Brazilian athlete (b. 1954)
- May 18 — Betty Robinson (87), American athlete (b. 1911)
- June 30 — Bob Backus (72), American hammer thrower (b. 1926)
- August 26 — Elena Murgoci (39), Romanian long-distance runner (b. 1960)
