= 1998 in the sport of athletics =

1998 in athletics
- Major world events: World Championships; World Indoor Championships
- IAAF Athletes of the Year: Haile Gebrselassie; Marion Jones

This page shows the main events during the 1998 year in the sport of athletics throughout the world.

== Major events ==
=== World ===
- Commonwealth Games
- Goodwill Games
- Grand Prix Final
- IAAF World Combined Events Challenge
- World Cross Country Championships
- World Cup
- World Half Marathon Championships
- World Junior Championships

=== Regional ===
- African Championships
- Asian Championships
- Asian Games
- Balkan Games
- CARIFTA Games
- Central American and Caribbean Games
- Central American and Caribbean Junior Championships
- European Championships
- European Cross Country Championships
- European Indoor Championships
- Ibero-American Championships
- South American Junior Championships
- South American Youth Championships

== World records ==
=== Men ===
Event	Athlete	Nation	Performance	Meeting	Place	Date
1500 m	Hicham El Guerrouj	Morocco	3:26.00		Rome, Italy	14 July
5,000 m	Haile Gebrselassie	Ethiopia	12:39.36		Helsinki, Finland	13 June
10,000 m	Haile Gebrselassie	Ethiopia	26:22.75		Hengelo, Netherlands	1 June
Half marathon	Paul Tergat	Kenya	59.17		Milan, Italy	4 April

=== Women ===
Event	Athlete	Nation	Performance	Meeting	Place	Date
One hour run	Tegla Loroupe	Kenya	18,340m		Borgholzhausen, Germany	7 August
Pole vault	Emma George	Australia	4.57 m		(New Zealand) North Shore, NZL	21 February
Pole vault	Emma George	Australia	4.58 m		Melbourne, Australia	14 March
Pole vault	Emma George	Australia	4.59 m		Brisbane, Australia	21 March
Hammer throw	Mihaela Melinte	Romania	73.14 m		Poiana Brasov, Romania	16 July

== Awards ==
=== Men ===
1998 TRACK & FIELD AWARDS	ATHLETE
IAAF World Athlete of the Year	Haile Gebrselassie (ETH)
Track & Field Athlete of the Year	Haile Gebrselassie (ETH)
European Athlete of the Year Award	Jonathan Edwards (GBR)
Best Male Track Athlete ESPY Award	Wilson Kipketer (DEN)

=== Women ===
1998 TRACK & FIELD AWARDS	ATHLETE
IAAF World Athlete of the Year	Marion Jones (USA)
Track & Field Athlete of the Year	Marion Jones (USA)
European Athlete of the Year Award	Christine Arron (FRA)
Best Female Track Athlete ESPY Award	Marion Jones (USA)

== Men's Best Year Performances ==
=== 400m Hurdles ===
RANK	1998 WORLD BEST PERFORMERS	TIME
1.	Bryan Bronson (USA)	47.03
2.	Angelo Taylor (USA)	47.90
3.	Joey Woody (USA)	47.97
4.	Stéphane Diagana (FRA)	48.04
5.	Ken Harnden (ZIM)	48.05

=== 3,000m Steeplechase ===
RANK	1998 WORLD BEST PERFORMERS	TIME
1.	Bernard Barmasai (KEN)	8:00.67
2.	Wilson Boit Kipketer (KEN)	8:01.05
3.	Moses Kiptanui (KEN)	8:04.96
4.	Paul Kosgei (KEN)	8:07.86
5.	Patrick Sang (KEN)	8:08.01

=== Pole Vault ===
RANK	1998 WORLD BEST PERFORMERS	HEIGHT
1.	Jeff Hartwig (USA)	6.01 m
2.	Dmitriy Markov (BLR)	6.00 m
3.	Jean Galfione (FRA)	5.97 m
4.	Maksim Tarasov (RUS)	5.95 m
5.	Danny Ecker (GER)	5.93 m

== Women's Best Year Performances ==
=== 60 metres ===
RANK	1998 WORLD BEST PERFORMERS	TIME
1.	Marion Jones (USA)	6.95
2.	Gail Devers (USA)	7.00
3.	Chioma Ajunwa (NGR)	7.02
4.	Frédérique Bangué (FRA)	7.11
5.	Melanie Paschke (GER)	7.14

=== 100 metres ===
RANK	1998 WORLD BEST PERFORMERS	TIME
1.	Marion Jones (USA)	10.65
2.	Christine Arron (FRA)	10.73
3.	Irina Privalova (RUS)	10.83
4.	Ekateríni Thánou (GRE)	10.87
5.	Chryste Gaines (USA)	10.89

=== 200 metres ===
RANK	1998 WORLD BEST PERFORMERS	TIME
1.	Marion Jones (USA)	21.62
2.	Inger Miller (USA)	22.20
3.	Falilat Ogunkoya (NGR)	22.22
4.	Beverly McDonald (JAM)	22.24
5.	Zhanna Block (UKR)	22.35

=== Half Marathon ===
RANK	1998 WORLD BEST PERFORMERS	TIME
1.	Elana Meyer (RSA)	1:07:29

=== 60m Hurdles ===
RANK	1998 WORLD BEST PERFORMERS	TIME
1.	Michelle Freeman (JAM)	7.74
2.	Melissa Morrison (USA)	7.83
3.	Patricia Girard (FRA)	7.85

=== 100m Hurdles ===
RANK	1998 WORLD BEST PERFORMERS	TIME
1.	Glory Alozie (NGR)	12.44
2.	Michelle Freeman (JAM)	12.52
3.	Melissa Morrison (USA)	12.53
4.	Svetla Dimitrova (BUL)	12.56
5.	Angie Vaughn (USA)	12.63
5.	Olga Shishigina (KAZ)	12.63

=== 400m Hurdles ===
RANK	1998 WORLD BEST PERFORMERS	TIME
1.	Kim Batten (USA)	52.74
2.	Nezha Bidouane (MAR)	52.96
3.	Deon Hemmings (JAM)	53.03
4.	Ionela Târlea (ROM)	53.37
5.	Tetyana Tereshchuk-Antipova (UKR)	53.40

=== 3,000m Steeplechase ===
RANK	1998 WORLD BEST PERFORMERS	TIME
1.	Daniela Petrescu (ROM)	9:55.28
2.	Svetlana Rogova (RUS)	9:57.62
3.	Luminita Gogârlea (ROM)	10:00.50
4.	Lesley Lehane (USA)	10:08.29
5.	Alina Cucerzan (ROM)	10:08.70

=== High Jump ===
RANK	1998 WORLD BEST PERFORMERS	HEIGHT
1.	Venelina Veneva (BUL)	2.03 m
2.	Monica Iagăr (ROM)	2.02 m
3.	Yelena Gulyayeva (RUS)	2.01 m
4.	Khristina Kalcheva (BUL)	1.99 m
5.	Zuzana Hlavonová (CZE)	1.98 m
5.	Tisha Waller (USA)	1.98 m

=== Shot Put ===
RANK	1998 WORLD BEST PERFORMERS	DISTANCE
1.	Viktoriya Pavlysh (UKR)	21.69 m
2.	Irina Korzhanenko (RUS)	20.82 m
3.	Corrie de Bruin (NED)	18.87 m
4.	Daniela Curovic (FR Yugoslavia)	18.86 m

=== Pole Vault ===
RANK	1998 WORLD BEST PERFORMERS	HEIGHT
1.	Emma George (AUS)	4.59 m
2.	Daniela Bártová (CZE)	4.51 m
3.	Stacy Dragila (USA)	4.42 m
4.	Anzhela Balakhonova (UKR)	4.40 m
5.	Yelena Belyakova (RUS)	4.38 m

=== Heptathlon ===
RANK	1998 WORLD BEST PERFORMERS	POINTS
1.	Denise Lewis (GBR)	6559
2.	Jackie Joyner-Kersee (USA)	6502
3.	DeDee Nathan (USA)	6479
4.	Irina Belova (RUS)	6466
5.	Kelly LaBounty (USA)	6465

== Marathon ==
=== Men's Best Year Performances ===
RANK	NAME ATHLETE	TIME	EVENT
1.	Ronaldo da Costa (BRA)	2:06:05 WR	Berlin Marathon
2.	Ondoro Osoro (KEN)	2:06:53	Chicago Marathon
3.	Khalid Khannouchi (MAR)	2:07:19	Chicago Marathon
4.	Fabián Roncero (ESP)	2:07:26	Rotterdam Marathon
5.	Josephat Kiprono (KEN)	2:07:27	Berlin Marathon
6.	Moses Tanui (KEN)	2:07:34	Boston Marathon
7.	Joseph Chebet (KEN)	2:07:37	Boston Marathon
8.	Lee Bong-Ju (KOR)	2:07:44	Rotterdam Marathon
9.	Gert Thys (RSA)	2:07:45	Chicago Marathon
9.	Gert Thys (RSA)	2:07:52	Boston Marathon

=== Women's Best Year Performances ===
RANK	NAME ATHLETE	TIME	EVENT
1.	Tegla Loroupe (KEN)	2:20:47	Rotterdam Marathon
2.	Naoko Takahashi (JPN)	2:21:47	Bangkok Marathon
3.	Catherina McKiernan (IRL)	2:22:23	Amsterdam Marathon
4.	Fatuma Roba (ETH)	2:23:21	Boston Marathon
5.	Joyce Chepchumba (KEN)	2:23:57	Chicago Marathon
6.	Franca Fiacconi (ITA)	2:25:17	New York Marathon
7.	Katrin Dörre (GER)	2:25:21	Hamburg Marathon
8.	Marleen Renders (BEL)	2:25:22	Berlin Marathon
9.	Sun Yingjie (CHN)	2:25:45	Tianjin Marathon
10.	Naoko Takahashi (JPN)	2:25:48	Nagoya Marathon

== Deaths ==
- April 6 — Ed Ablowich (84), American sprinter (b. 1913)
- August 17 — Władysław Komar (58), Polish shot putter (b. 1940)
- September 16 — John Systad (86), Norwegian long-distance runner (b. 1912)
- December 2 — Mikio Oda (93), Japanese athlete (b. 1905)
