= 2003 World Championships in Athletics – Women's 1500 metres =

These are the official results of the Women's 1500 metres event at the 2003 IAAF World Championships in Paris, France. There were a total number of 32 participating athletes, with three qualifying heats, two semi-finals and the final held on Sunday 31 August 2003 at 18:20h. The winning margin was 0.52 seconds.

== Final ==
RANK	FINAL	TIME
	Tatyana Tomashova (RUS)	3:58.52 CR
	Süreyya Ayhan (TUR)	3:59.04
	Hayley Tullett (GBR)	3:59.95
4.	Yekaterina Rozenberg (RUS)	4:00.59
5.	Jackline Maranga (KEN)	4:01.64
6.	Naomi Mugo (KEN)	4:02.33
7.	Daniela Yordanova (BUL)	4:02.34
8.	Yelena Zadorozhnaya (RUS)	4:02.46
9.	Maria Cioncan (ROU)	4:02.80
10.	Joanne Pavey (GBR)	4:03.03
11.	Nelya Neporadna (UKR)	4:04.44
12.	Jolanda Čeplak (SLO)	4:14.18

== Semi-final ==
- Held on Friday 29 August 2003

RANK	HEAT 1	TIME
1.	Maria Cioncan (ROU)	4:03.40
2.	Süreyya Ayhan (TUR)	4:03.60
3.	Joanne Pavey (GBR)	4:03.78
4.	Hayley Tullett (GBR)	4:03.85
5.	Nelya Neporadna (UKR)	4:04.24
6.	Naomi Mugo (KEN)	4:04.54
7.	Daniela Yordanova (BUL)	4:04.83
8.	Judit Varga (HUN)	4:06.64
9.	Kutre Dulecha (ETH)	4:06.66
10.	Maria Martins (FRA)	4:08.30
11.	Natalia Rodríguez (ESP)	4:08.80
12.	Mardrea Hyman (JAM)	4:13.95

RANK	HEAT 2	TIME
1.	Tatyana Tomashova (RUS)	4:05.38
2.	Yekaterina Rozenberg (RUS)	4:05.51
3.	Jackline Maranga (KEN)	4:05.63
4.	Jolanda Čeplak (SLO)	4:05.84
5.	Yelena Zadorozhnaya (RUS)	4:05.86
6.	Alesia Turava (BLR)	4:07.26
7.	Nuria Fernández (ESP)	4:09.69
8.	Alina Cucerzan (ROU)	4:11.99
9.	Iryna Lishchynska (UKR)	4:12.01
10.	Carla Sacramento (POR)	4:13.14
11.	Adoración García (ESP)	4:16.28
—	Regina Jacobs (USA)	DQ

== Heats ==
Held on Wednesday 27 August 2003

RANK	HEAT 1	TIME
1.	Süreyya Ayhan (TUR)	4:08.12
2.	Joanne Pavey (GBR)	4:08.60
3.	Yelena Zadorozhnaya (RUS)	4:08.93
4.	Nuria Fernández (ESP)	4:09.07
5.	Iryna Lishchynska (UKR)	4:09.48
6.	Naomi Mugo (KEN)	4:11.95
7.	Mardrea Hyman (JAM)	4:14.17
8.	Meskerem Assefa (ETH)	4:16.38
9.	Gabriela Traña (CRC)	4:32.58
10.	Roda Ali Wais (DJI)	5:10.16 (NR)
—	Regina Jacobs (USA)	DQ

RANK	HEAT 2	TIME
1.	Maria Cioncan (ROU)	4:10.16
2.	Hayley Tullett (GBR)	4:10.53
3.	Tatyana Tomashova (RUS)	4:10.95
4.	Alesia Turava (BLR)	4:11.26
5.	Jolanda Čeplak (SLO)	4:11.26
6.	Jackline Maranga (KEN)	4:11.38
7.	Adoración García (ESP)	4:11.84
8.	Judit Varga (HUN)	4:11.89
9.	Veerle Dejaeghere (BEL)	4:19.08
10.	Rosa Saul (ANG)	4:20.99

RANK	HEAT 3	TIME
1.	Maria Martins (FRA)	4:12.53
2.	Yekaterina Rozenberg (RUS)	4:12.54
3.	Nelya Neporadna (UKR)	4:12.71
4.	Alina Cucerzan (ROU)	4:12.79
5.	Daniela Yordanova (BUL)	4:12.98
6.	Kutre Dulecha (ETH)	4:13.01
7.	Carla Sacramento (POR)	4:13.70
8.	Natalia Rodríguez (ESP)	4:14.08
9.	Daniela Kuleska (MKD)	4:29.65
—	Hasna Benhassi (MAR)	DNS
—	Kelly Holmes (GBR)	DNS
