= 1995 in the sport of athletics =

1995 in athletics
- Major world events: World Championships; World Indoor Championships
- IAAF Athletes of the Year: Jonathan Edwards; Gwen Torrence

This article contains an overview of the year 1995 in athletics.

== Major events ==
=== World ===
- Grand Prix Final
- World Championships
- World Cross Country Championships
- World Half Marathon Championships
- World Indoor Championships
- World Race Walking Cup

=== Regional ===
- All-Africa Games
- Asian Championships
- CARIFTA Games
- Central American and Caribbean Championships
- European Cross Country Championships
- European Junior Championships
- Pan American Games
- Pan American Junior Championships
- South American Championships
- South American Junior Championships

== World records ==
=== Men ===
Event	Athlete	Nation	Performance	Meeting	Place	Date
1500 m	Noureddine Morceli	Algeria	3:27.37		Nice, France	12 July
2,000 m	Noureddine Morceli	Algeria	4:47.88		Paris, France	3 July
5,000 m	Moses Kiptanui	Kenya	12:55.30		Rome, Italy	8 June
5,000 m	Haile Gebrselassie	Ethiopia	12:44.39		Zürich, Switzerland	16 August
10,000 m	Haile Gebrselassie	Ethiopia	26:43.53		Hengelo, Netherlands	5 June
3000 m steeplechase	Moses Kiptanui	Kenya	7:59.18		Zürich, Switzerland	16 August
Triple jump	Jonathan Edwards	United Kingdom	17.98 m		Salamanca, Spain	18 July
Triple jump	Jonathan Edwards	United Kingdom	18.16 m	World Championships	Gothenburg, Sweden	7 August
Triple jump	Jonathan Edwards	United Kingdom	18.29 m	World Championships	Gothenburg, Sweden	7 August

=== Women ===
Event	Athlete	Nation	Performance	Meeting	Place	Date
1,000 m	Maria Mutola	Mozambique	2:29.34		Brussels, Belgium	5 August
5,000 m	Fernanda Ribeiro	Portugal	14:36.45		Hechtel, Belgium	22 July
400 m hurdles	Kim Batten	United States	52.61	World Championships	Gothenburg, Sweden	11 August
Triple jump	Inessa Kravets	Ukraine	15.50 m	World Championships	Gothenburg, Sweden	10 August
Hammer throw	Olga Kuzenkova	Russia	68.14 m		Moscow, Russia	5 June
Hammer throw	Olga Kuzenkova	Russia	68.16 m		Moscow, Russia	18 June

== Awards ==
=== Men ===
1995 TRACK & FIELD AWARDS	ATHLETE
IAAF World Athlete of the Year	Jonathan Edwards (GBR)
Track & Field Athlete of the Year	Haile Gebrselassie (ETH)
European Athlete of the Year Award	Jonathan Edwards (GBR)
Best Male Track Athlete ESPY Award	Dennis Mitchell (USA)

=== Women ===
1995 TRACK & FIELD AWARDS	ATHLETE
IAAF World Athlete of the Year	Gwen Torrence (USA)
Track & Field Athlete of the Year	Sonia O'Sullivan (IRL)
European Athlete of the Year Award	Sonia O'Sullivan (IRL)
Best Female Track Athlete ESPY Award	Gwen Torrence (USA)

== Season's bests ==
Best marks of the year
Event	Men			Women		
Event	Athlete	Mark	Notes	Athlete	Mark	Notes
100 metres	Donovan Bailey (CAN)	9.91		Gwen Torrence (USA)	10.84	
200 metres	Michael Johnson (USA)	19.79		Gwen Torrence (USA)	21.77	
400 metres	Michael Johnson (USA)	43.39		Marie-José Pérec (FRA)	49.28	
800 metres	Wilson Kipketer (DEN)	1:42.87		Maria Mutola (MOZ)	1:55.72	
1500 metres	Noureddine Morceli (ALG)	3:27.37	WR	Sonia O'Sullivan (IRL)	3:58.85	
3000 metres	Moses Kiptanui (KEN)	7:27.18		Sonia O'Sullivan (IRL)	8:27.57	
5000 metres	Haile Gebrselassie (ETH)	12:44.39	WR	Fernanda Ribeiro (POR)	14:36.45	WR
10,000 metres	Haile Gebrselassie (ETH)	26:43.53	WR	Fernanda Ribeiro (POR)	31:04.99	
100/110 metres hurdles	Allen Johnson (USA)	12.98		Olga Shishigina (KAZ)	12.44	
400 metres hurdles	Stéphane Diagana (FRA)	47.37		Kim Batten (USA)	52.61	WR
3000 metres steeplechase	Moses Kiptanui (KEN)	7:59.18	WR	—		
Pole vault	Okkert Brits (RSA)	6.03 m		Emma George (AUS)	4.28 m	
High jump	Javier Sotomayor (CUB)	2.40 m		Inga Babakova (UKR)	2.05 m	
Long jump	Iván Pedroso (CUB)	8.71 m		Heike Drechsler (GER)	7.07 m	
Triple jump	Jonathan Edwards (GBR)	18.29 m	WR	Inessa Kravets (UKR)	15.50 m	WR
Shot put	John Godina (USA)	22.00 m		Astrid Kumbernuss (GER)	21.22 m	
Discus throw	Lars Riedel (GER)	69.08 m		Mette Bergmann (NOR)	69.68 m	
Javelin throw	Raymond Hecht (GER)	92.60 m		Natalya Shikolenko (BLR)	71.18 m	
Hammer throw	Andrey Abduvaliyev (UZB)	83.10 m		Olga Kuzenkova (RUS)	68.16 m	WR
Heptathlon	—			Ghada Shouaa (SYR)	6715 pts	
Decathlon	Dan O'Brien (USA)	8695 pts		—		
4×100 metres relay	Canada; Robert Esmie; Glenroy Gilbert; Bruny Surin; Donovan Bailey	38.16		United States; Celena Mondie-Milner; Carlette Guidry; Chryste Gaines; Gwen Torrence	42.12	
4×400 metres relay	United States; Marlon Ramsey; Derek Mills; Harry Reynolds; Michael Johnson	2:57.32		Russia; Tatyana Chebykina; Svetlana Goncharenko; Tatyana Zakharova; Yelena Andreyeva	3:22.24	
