= 1997 in the sport of athletics =

1997 in athletics
- Major world events: World Championships; World Indoor Championships
- IAAF Athletes of the Year: Wilson Kipketer; Marion Jones

This article contains an overview of the year 1997 in athletics.

== Major events ==
=== World ===
- IAAF Grand Prix Final
- World Championships
- World Cross Country Championships
- World Half Marathon Championships
- World Indoor Championships
- World Race Walking Cup
- World Student Games

=== Regional ===
- CARIFTA Games
- Central American and Caribbean Championships
- East Asian Games
- European Cross Country Championships
- European Junior Championships
- European U23 Championships
- Mediterranean Games
- Pan American Junior Championships
- South American Championships
- South American Junior Championships

== World records ==
=== Men ===
Event	Athlete	Nation	Performance	Meeting	Place	Date
800 m	Wilson Kipketer	Denmark	1:41.73		Stockholm, Sweden	7 July
800 m	Wilson Kipketer	Denmark	1:41.24		Zürich, Switzerland	13 August
800 m	Wilson Kipketer	Denmark	1:41.11		Cologne, Germany	24 August
5000 m	Haile Gebrselassie	Ethiopia	12:41.86		Zürich, Switzerland	13 August
5000 m	Daniel Komen	Kenya	12:39.74		Brussels, Belgium	22 August
10,000 m	Haile Gebrselassie	Ethiopia	26:31.32		Oslo, Norway	4 July
10,000 m	Paul Tergat	Kenya	26:27.85		Brussels, Belgium	22 August
3000 m steeplechase	Wilson Boit Kipketer	Kenya	7:59.08		Zürich, Switzerland	13 August
3000 m steeplechase	Bernard Barmasai	Kenya	7:55.72		Cologne, Germany	24 August

=== Women ===
Event	Athlete	Nation	Performance	Meeting	Place	Date
5000 m	Dong Yanmei	China	14:31.27		Shanghai, China	21 October
5000 m	Jiang Bo	China	14:28.09		Shanghai, China	23 October
Pole vault	Emma George	Australia	4.50 m		Melbourne, Australia	8 February
Pole vault	Emma George	Australia	4.55 m		Melbourne, Australia	20 February
Hammer throw	Mihaela Melinte	Romania	69.58 m		Bucharest, Romania	8 March
Hammer throw	Olga Kuzenkova	Russia	70.78 m		Smolensk, Russia	11 June
Hammer throw	Olga Kuzenkova	Russia	71.22 m		Munich, Germany	22 June
Hammer throw	Olga Kuzenkova	Russia	73.10 m		Munich, Germany	22 June

== Awards ==
=== Men ===
1996 TRACK & FIELD AWARDS	ATHLETE
IAAF World Athlete of the Year	Wilson Kipketer (DEN)
Track & Field Athlete of the Year	Wilson Kipketer (DEN)
European Athlete of the Year Award	Wilson Kipketer (DEN)
Best Male Track Athlete ESPY Award	Michael Johnson (USA)

=== Women ===
1996 TRACK & FIELD AWARDS	ATHLETE
IAAF World Athlete of the Year	Marion Jones (USA)
Track & Field Athlete of the Year	Marion Jones (USA)
European Athlete of the Year Award	Astrid Kumbernuss (GER)
Best Female Track Athlete ESPY Award	Marie-José Pérec (FRA)

== Season's bests ==
Best marks of the year
Event	Men			Women		
Event	Athlete	Mark	Notes	Athlete	Mark	Notes
100 metres	Maurice Greene (USA)	9.86		Marion Jones (USA)	10.76	
200 metres	Ato Boldon (TRI)	19.77		Marion Jones (USA)	21.76	
400 metres	Michael Johnson (USA)	43.75		Cathy Freeman (AUS)	49.39	
800 metres	Wilson Kipketer (DEN)	1:41.11	WR	Ana Fidelia Quirot (CUB)	1:54.82	
1500 metres	Hicham El Guerrouj (MAR)	3:28.91		Jiang Bo (CHN)	3:50.98	
3000 metres	Haile Gebrselassie (ETH)	7:26.02		Gabriela Szabo (ROU)	8:27.78	
5000 metres	Daniel Komen (KEN)	12:39.74	WR	Jiang Bo (CHN)	14:28.09	WR
10,000 metres	Paul Tergat (KEN)	26:27.85	WR	Dong Yanmei (CHN)	30:38.09	
100/110 metres hurdles	Allen Johnson (USA)	12.93		Ludmila Engquist (SWE)	12.50	
400 metres hurdles	Bryan Bronson (USA)	47.64		Kim Batten (USA) Nezha Bidouane (MAR)	52.97	
3000 metres steeplechase	Bernard Barmasai (KEN)	7:55.72	WR	Melissa Teemant (USA)	10:30.90	
Pole vault	Sergey Bubka (UKR)	6.05 m		Emma George (AUS)	4.55 m	WR
High jump	Javier Sotomayor (CUB)	2.37 m		Stefka Kostadinova (BUL) Inga Babakova (UKR)	2.02 m	
Long jump	Iván Pedroso (CUB)	8.63 m		Lyudmila Galkina (RUS)	7.05 m	
Triple jump	Yoelbi Quesada (CUB)	17.85 m		Sárka Kaspárková (CZE)	15.20 m	
Shot put	Randy Barnes (USA)	22.03 m		Astrid Kumbernuss (GER)	21.22 m	
Discus throw	Lars Reidel (GER)	71.50 m		Xiao Yanling (CHN)	70.00 m	
Javelin throw	Jan Železný (CZE)	94.02 m		Trine Hattestad (NOR)	69.66 m	
Hammer throw	Heinz Weis (GER)	83.04 m		Olga Kuzenkova (RUS)	73.10 m	WR
Heptathlon	—			Sabine Braun (GER)	6787 pts	
Decathlon	Tomás Dvorák (CZE)	8837 pts		—		
4×100 metres relay	Canada; Robert Esmie; Glenroy Gilbert; Bruny Surin; Donovan Bailey	37.86		United States; Chryste Gaines; Marion Jones; Inger Miller; Gail Devers	41.47	
4×400 metres relay	United Kingdom; Iwan Thomas; Roger Black; Jamie Baulch; Mark Richardson	2:56.65		Germany; Anke Feller; Uta Rohländer-Fromm; Anja Rücker; Grit Breuer	3:20.92	
