= Best Female Track Athlete ESPY Award =

Annual athletic award (1993–2006)

The Best Female Track Athlete ESPY Award was presented annually between 1993 and 2006 to the female track and field athlete, irrespective of nationality, adjudged to be the best in a given calendar year. Beginning in 2007, this award was combined with the parallel Best Male Track Athlete ESPY Award into the single Best Track and Field Athlete ESPY Award.

Between 1993 and 2004, the award voting panel comprised variously fans; sportswriters and broadcasters, sports executives, and retired sportspersons, termed collectively experts; and ESPN personalities, but balloting thereafter was exclusively by fans over the Internet from amongst choices selected by the ESPN Select Nominating Committee.

Through the 2001 iteration of the ESPY Awards, ceremonies were conducted in February of each year to honor achievements over the previous calendar year; awards presented thereafter were conferred in June and reflected performance from the June previous.

== List of winners ==
Year	Athlete	Nation represented	Event(s) contested
1993	Evelyn Ashford	United States	100 metres, 4 × 100 metres relay
1994	Gail Devers	United States	100 metres, 100 metres hurdles, 4 × 100 metres relay
1995	Gwen Torrence	United States	100 metres, 200 metres, 4 × 100 metres relay
1996	Kim Batten	United States	400 metres hurdles
1997	Marie-José Pérec	France	200 metres, 400 metres
1998	Marion Jones	United States	100 metres, 4 × 100 metres relay, long jump
1999	Marion Jones	United States	100 metres, 200 metres, 4 × 100 metres relay, long jump
2000	Marion Jones	United States	100 metres, 200 metres, long jump
2001	Marion Jones	United States	100 metres, 200 metres, 4 × 100 metres relay, 4 × 400 metres relay, long jump
2002	Marion Jones	United States	100 metres, 200 metres, long jump
2003	Gail Devers	United States	100 metres, 200 metres, 4 × 100 metres relay
2004	Gail Devers	United States	100 metres, 200 metres, 4 × 100 metres relay
2005	No award presented		
2006	Allyson Felix	United States	200 metres

== See also ==
- List of sports awards honoring women
- Best Male Track Athlete ESPY Award
- European Athlete of the Year Award
- IAAF Athlete of the Year Award
- IAAF Golden League
