= 2001 in the sport of athletics =

2001 in athletics
- Major world events: World Championships; World Indoor Championships
- IAAF Athletes of the Year: Hicham El Guerrouj; Stacy Dragila

This article contains an overview of the sport of athletics, including track and field, cross country and road running, in the year 2001.

The foremost competition of the season was the 2001 World Championships in Athletics in Edmonton, Alberta, Canada. The 2001 IAAF World Indoor Championships was the second major track and field event that year.

== Major events ==
=== World ===
- World Championships
- World Cross Country Championships
- World Half Marathon Championships
- Grand Prix Final
- World Indoor Championships
- World Youth Championships
- World Student Games
- Goodwill Games

=== Regional ===
- African Junior Championships
- Asian Cross Country Championships
- East Asian Games
- Maccabiah Games
- Southeast Asian Games
- Balkan Games
- European Cup
- European Junior Championships
- European U23 Championships
- European Cross Country Championships
- European Race Walking Cup
- Island Games
- Mediterranean Games
- Bolivarian Games
- CAC Championships
- Central American Games
- Jeux de la Francophonie
- Pan American Junior Championships
- South American Championships

=== National ===
- China National Games
- Lithuanian Athletics Championships

== World records ==
=== Men ===
Event	Athlete	Nation	Performance	Meeting	Place	Date
3000 metres	Brahim Boulami	Morocco	7:55.28		Brussels, Belgium	24 August
Decathlon	Roman Sebrle	Czech Republic	9,026		Götzis, Austria	26-27 May

=== Women ===
Event	Athlete	Nation	Performance	Meeting	Place	Date
3000 m steeplechase	Justyna Bak	Poland	9:25.31		Nice, France	9 July
Pole vault	Stacy Dragila	United States	4.63 m		(United States) New York, USA	2 February
Pole vault	Svetlana Feofanova	Russia	4.64 m		Dortmund, Germany	11 February
Pole vault	Stacy Dragila	United States	4.66 m		(United States) Pocatello, USA	17 February
Pole vault	Stacy Dragila	United States	4.70 m		(United States) Pocatello, USA	17 February
Pole vault	Stacy Dragila	United States	4.70 m		(United States) Pocatello, USA	27 April
Pole vault	Stacy Dragila	United States	4.71 m		(United States) Stanford, USA	9 June
Pole vault	Stacy Dragila	United States	4.81 m		(United States) Stanford, USA	9 June
Javelin Throw (new)	Osleidys Menéndez	Cuba	71.54 m		Rethymno, Greece	1 July

== Awards ==
=== Men ===
2001 TRACK & FIELD AWARDS	ATHLETE
IAAF World Athlete of the Year	Hicham El Guerrouj (MAR)
Track & Field Athlete of the Year	Hicham El Guerrouj (MAR)
European Athlete of the Year Award	André Bucher (SUI)
Best Male Track Athlete ESPY Award	Maurice Greene (USA)

=== Women ===
2001 TRACK & FIELD AWARDS	ATHLETE
IAAF World Athlete of the Year	Stacy Dragila (USA)
Track & Field Athlete of the Year	Stacy Dragila (USA)
European Athlete of the Year Award	Stephanie Graf (AUT)
Best Female Track Athlete ESPY Award	Marion Jones (USA)

== Men's Best Year Performances ==
=== 400m Hurdles ===
RANK	2001 WORLD BEST PERFORMERS	TIME
1.	Félix Sánchez (DOM)	47.38
2.	Fabrizio Mori (ITA)	47.54
3.	Dai Tamesue (JPN)	47.89
4.	Angelo Taylor (USA)	47.95
5.	Hadi Soua'an Al-Somaily (KSA)	47.99

=== 3,000m Steeplechase ===
RANK	2001 WORLD BEST PERFORMERS	TIME
1.	Brahim Boulami (MAR)	7:55.28
2.	Reuben Kosgei (KEN)	7:57.29
3.	Stephen Cherono (KEN)	7:58.66
4.	Kipkirui Misoi (KEN)	8:01.69
5.	Wilson Boit Kipketer (KEN)	8:01.73

=== Pole Vault ===
RANK	2001 WORLD BEST PERFORMERS	HEIGHT
1.	Dmitriy Markov (AUS)	6.05 m
2.	Aleksandr Averbukh (ISR)	5.91 m
3.	Lawrence Johnson (USA)	5.90 m
3.	Jeff Hartwig (USA)	5.90 m
5.	Pavel Burlachenko (RUS)	5.86 m

== Women's Best Year Performances ==
=== 100 metres ===
RANK	2001 WORLD BEST PERFORMERS	TIME
1.	Zhanna Block (UKR)	10.82
2.	Ekateríni Thánou (GRE)	10.91
3.	Chandra Sturrup (BAH)	10.95
4.	Myriam Léonie Mani (CMR)	10.98
4.	Chryste Gaines (USA)	10.98

=== 200 metres ===
RANK	2001 WORLD BEST PERFORMERS	TIME
1.	LaTasha Jenkins (USA)	22.39
1.	Debbie Ferguson (BAH)	22.39
3.	Cydonie Mothersille (CAY)	22.54
3.	Myriam Léonie Mani (CMR)	22.54
5.	Beverly McDonald (JAM)	22.57

=== Half Marathon ===
RANK	2001 WORLD BEST PERFORMERS	TIME
1.	Paula Radcliffe (GBR)	1:06:47

=== 100m Hurdles ===
RANK	2001 WORLD BEST PERFORMERS	TIME
1.	Anjanette Kirkland (USA)	12.42
2.	Gail Devers (USA)	12.53
3.	Delloreen Ennis-London (JAM)	12.57
4.	Olga Shishigina (KAZ)	12.58
4.	Svetla Dimitrova (BUL)	12.58

=== 400m Hurdles ===
RANK	2001 WORLD BEST PERFORMERS	TIME
1.	Nezha Bidouane (MAR)	53.34
2.	Daimí Pernía (CUB)	53.81
3.	Yuliya Pechonkina (RUS)	53.84
4.	Debbie-Ann Parris (JAM)	53.88
5.	Tetyana Tereshchuk-Antipova (UKR)	53.89

=== 3,000m Steeplechase ===
RANK	2001 WORLD BEST PERFORMERS	TIME
1.	Justyna Bak (POL)	9:44.36
2.	Élodie Olivarès (FRA)	9:44.68
3.	Cristina Casandra (ROM)	9:45.92
4.	Lisa Nye (USA)	9:49.41
5.	Elizabeth Jackson (USA)	9:49.73

=== High Jump ===
RANK	2001 WORLD BEST PERFORMERS	HEIGHT
1.	Venelina Veneva (BUL)	2.04 m
2.	Inga Babakova (UKR)	2.03 m
3.	Hestrie Cloete (RSA)	2.01 m
4.	Kajsa Bergqvist (SWE)	2.00 m
4.	Dóra Győrffy (HUN)	2.00 m

=== Pole Vault ===
RANK	2001 WORLD BEST PERFORMERS	HEIGHT
1.	Stacy Dragila (USA)	4.81 m
2.	Svetlana Feofanova (RUS)	4.75 m
3.	Mary Vincent (USA)	4.61 m
3.	Monika Pyrek (POL)	4.61 m
5.	Kellie Suttle (USA)	4.60 m

=== Heptathlon ===
RANK	2001 WORLD BEST PERFORMERS	POINTS
1.	Eunice Barber (FRA)	6736
2.	Yelena Prokhorova (RUS)	6694
3.	Natalya Roshchupkina (RUS)	6551
4.	Natalya Sazanovich (BLR)	6539
5.	Irina Belova (RUS)	6528

== Deaths ==
- March 31 — Diego García (39), Spanish long-distance runner (b. 1961)
- August 15 — Richard Chelimo (29), Kenyan athlete (b. 1972)
- October 17 — Micheline Ostermeyer (78), French athlete (b. 1922)
