= 2003 in the sport of athletics =

2003 in athletics
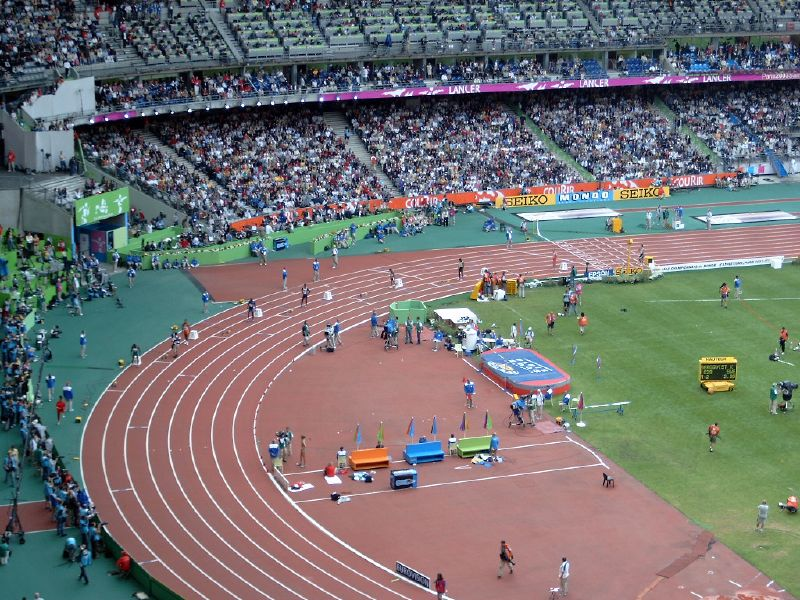
- Action at the World Championships in Paris
- Major world events: World Championships; World Indoor Championships
- IAAF Athletes of the Year: Hicham El Guerrouj; Hestrie Cloete

This article contains an overview of the sport of athletics, including track and field, cross country and road running, in the year 2003.

The foremost competition of the year was the 2003 World Championships in Athletics, followed by the 2003 IAAF World Indoor Championships. At regional level, athletics was featured at two major games that were held that year: the 2003 Pan American Games and the 2003 All-Africa Games.

== Major events ==
=== World ===
- World Championships in Athletics
- World Indoor Championships
- World Athletics Final
- World Cross Country Championships
- World Half Marathon Championships
- World Youth Championships
- World Student Games
- Military World Games
- Golden League
- World Outdoor Meetings
- World Marathon Majors

=== Regional ===
- All-Africa Games
- African Junior Championships
- Asian Championships
- Asian Cross Country Championships
- Central Asian Games
- Indian Ocean Island Games
- Southeast Asian Games
- Central American and Caribbean Championships
- Pan American Games
- South American Athletics Championships
- South American Cross Country Championships
- Balkan Games
- European Cross Country Championships
- European Cup
- European Junior Championships
- European U23 Championships
- European Mountain Running Championships

== World records ==
=== Men ===
Event	Athlete	Nation	Performance	Meeting	Place	Date
30 kilometres (road)	Takayuki Matsumiya	Japan	1:28.36		Kumamoto, Japan	16 February
Marathon	Paul Tergat	Kenya	2:04:55		Berlin, Germany	28 September

=== Women ===
Event	Athlete	Nation	Performance	Meeting	Place	Date
10 kilometres (road)	Paula Radcliffe	United Kingdom	30:21		San Juan, Puerto Rico	23 February
Marathon	Paula Radcliffe	United Kingdom	2:15:25		(United Kingdom) London, Great Britain	13 April
3000 m steeplechase	Gulnara Samitova-Galkina	Russia	9:08.33		Tula, Russia	10 August
400 m hurdles	Yuliya Pechonkina	Russia	52.34 m		(Russia) Tula, RUS	8 August
Pole vault	Yelena Isinbayeva	Russia	4.82 m		(United Kingdom) Gateshead, Great Britain	13 July

== Awards ==
=== Men ===
2003 TRACK & FIELD AWARDS	WINNER
IAAF World Athlete of the Year	Hicham El Guerrouj (MAR)
Track & Field Athlete of the Year	Hicham El Guerrouj (MAR)
European Athlete of the Year Award	Christian Olsson (SWE)
Best Male Track Athlete ESPY Award	Tim Montgomery (USA)

=== Women ===
2003 TRACK & FIELD AWARDS	WINNER
IAAF World Athlete of the Year	Hestrie Cloete (RSA)
Track & Field Athlete of the Year	Hestrie Cloete (RSA)
European Athlete of the Year Award	Carolina Klüft (SWE)
Best Female Track Athlete ESPY Award	Gail Devers (USA)

== Men's best year performances ==
=== 400m hurdles ===
RANK	2003 WORLD BEST PERFORMERS	TIME
1.	Félix Sánchez (DOM)	47.25
2.	Kemel Thompson (JAM)	48.05
3.	Periklís Iakovákis (GRE)	48.17
4.	Joey Woody (USA)	48.18
5.	Bershawn Jackson (USA)	48.23

=== 3000m steeplechase ===
RANK	2003 WORLD BEST PERFORMERS	TIME
1.	Saif Saeed Shaheen (QAT)	7:57.38
2.	Paul Kipsiele Koech (KEN)	7:57.42
3.	Ezekiel Kemboi (KEN)	8:02.49
4.	Bouabdellah Tahri (FRA)	8:06.91
5.	Kipkirui Misoi (KEN)	8:07.74

=== Pole vault ===
RANK	2003 WORLD BEST PERFORMERS	HEIGHT
1.	Romain Mesnil (FRA)	5.95 m
2.	Aleksandr Averbukh (ISR)	5.93 m
3.	Tim Lobinger (GER)	5.91 m
4.	Giuseppe Gibilisco (ITA)	5.90 m
5.	Oscar Janson (SWE)	5.87 m

== Women's best year performances ==
=== 100 metres ===
RANK	2003 WORLD BEST PERFORMERS	TIME
1.	Chryste Gaines (USA)	10.86
2.	Chandra Sturrup (BAH)	10.89
3.	Torri Edwards (USA)	10.93
4.	Debbie Ferguson (BAH)	10.97
5.	Zhanna Block (UKR)	10.99

=== 200 metres ===
RANK	2003 WORLD BEST PERFORMERS	TIME
1.	Allyson Felix (USA)	22.11
2.	Torri Edwards (USA)	22.28
3.	LaTasha Jenkins (USA)	22.31
4.	Anastasiya Kapachinskaya (RUS)	22.38
5.	Muriel Hurtis-Houairi (FRA)	22.41

=== Half marathon ===
RANK	2003 WORLD BEST PERFORMERS	TIME
1.	Paula Radcliffe (GBR)	1:05:39

=== 100m hurdles ===
RANK	2003 WORLD BEST PERFORMERS	TIME
1.	Gail Devers (USA)	12.45
1.	Brigitte Foster-Hylton (JAM)	12.45
3.	Miesha McKelvy (USA)	12.51
4.	Perdita Felicien (CAN)	12.53
5.	Donica Merriman (USA)	12.65

=== 400m hurdles ===
RANK	2003 WORLD BEST PERFORMERS	TIME
1.	Yuliya Pechonkina (RUS)	52.34
2.	Jana Rawlinson (AUS)	53.22
3.	Sandra Glover (USA)	53.34
4.	Andrea Blackett (BAR)	53.71
5.	Ionela Târlea (ROM)	53.87

=== 3000m steeplechase ===
RANK	2003 WORLD BEST PERFORMERS	TIME
1.	Gulnara Samitova-Galkina (RUS)	9:08.33
2.	Alesya Turova (BLR)	9:20.28
3.	Lyubov Ivanova (RUS)	9:24.78
4.	Yekaterina Volkova (RUS)	9:32.31
5.	Dorcus Inzikuru (UGA)	9:39.51

=== High jump ===
RANK	2003 WORLD BEST PERFORMERS	HEIGHT
1.	Kajsa Bergqvist (SWE)	2.06 m
1.	Hestrie Cloete (RSA)	2.06 m
3.	Marina Kuptsova (RUS)	2.02 m
4.	Inga Babakova (UKR)	2.01 m
4.	Viktoriya Palamar (UKR)	2.01 m
4.	Blanka Vlašić (CRO)	2.01 m
4.	Amy Acuff (USA)	2.01 m
4.	Venelina Veneva (BUL)	2.01 m

=== Pole vault ===
RANK	2003 WORLD BEST PERFORMERS	HEIGHT
1.	Yelena Isinbayeva (RUS)	4.82 m
2.	Svetlana Feofanova (RUS)	4.75 m
3.	Yvonne Buschbaum (GER)	4.70 m
3.	Tatyana Polnova (RUS)	4.70 m
3.	Annika Becker (GER)	4.70 m

=== Heptathlon ===
RANK	2003 WORLD BEST PERFORMERS	POINTS
1.	Carolina Klüft (SWE)	7001
2.	Eunice Barber (FRA)	6755
3.	Natalya Sazanovich (BLR)	6524
4.	Yelena Prokhorova (RUS)	6452
5.	Denise Lewis (GBR)	6282

== Marathon ==
=== Men's competition ===
==== Pan American Games ====
RANK	ATHLETE	TIME
	Vanderlei de Lima (BRA)	2:19:08
	Bruce Deacon (CAN)	2:20:25
	Diego Colorado (COL)	2:21:48

==== Best year performances ====
RANK	NAME ATHLETE	TIME	EVENT
1.	Paul Tergat (KEN)	2:04:55 WR	Berlin Marathon
2.	Sammy Korir (KEN)	2:04:56	Berlin Marathon
3.	Evans Rutto (KEN)	2:05:50	Chicago Marathon
4.	Titus Munji (KEN)	2:06:15	Berlin Marathon
5.	Michael Kosgei Rotich (KEN)	2:06:33	Paris Marathon
6.	Benoît Zwierzchiewski (FRA)	2:06:36	Paris Marathon
7.	William Kipsang (KEN)	2:06:38	Amsterdam Marathon
8.	Felix Limo (KEN)	2:06:42	Amsterdam Marathon
9.	Wilson Onsare (KEN)	2:06:47	Paris Marathon
10.	Driss El Himer (FRA)	2:06:48	Paris Marathon

=== Women's competition ===
==== Pan American Games ====
RANK	ATHLETE	TIME
	Márcia Narloch (BRA)	2:39:54
	Mariela González (CUB)	2:42:55
	Érika Olivera (CHI)	2:44:52

==== Best year performances ====
RANK	NAME ATHLETE	TIME	EVENT
1.	Paula Radcliffe (GBR)	2:15:24 WR	London Marathon
2.	Sun Yingjie (CHN)	2:19:39	Beijing Marathon
3.	Catherine Ndereba (KEN)	2:19:55	London Marathon
4.	Deena Kastor (USA)	2:21:15	London Marathon
5.	Mizuki Noguchi (JPN)	2:21:18	Osaka International Ladies Marathon
6.	Masako Chiba (JPN)	2:21:45	Osaka Marathon
7.	Naoko Sakamoto (JPN)	2:21:51	Osaka Marathon
8.	Lornah Kiplagat (KEN)	2:22:22	Osaka Marathon
9.	Margaret Okayo (KEN)	2:22:31	New York Marathon
10.	Catherine Ndereba (KEN)	2:23:03	New York Marathon

== Deaths ==
- April 22 — Mike Larrabee, American athlete (b. 1933)
- April 25 — Samson Kitur (37), Kenyan middle-distance runner (b. 1966)
- April 28 — Juha Tiainen (47), Finnish hammer thrower (b. 1955)
- September 24 — Benson Masya (33), Kenyan long-distance runner (b. 1970)
