= Track & Field News Athlete of the Year =

Annual award

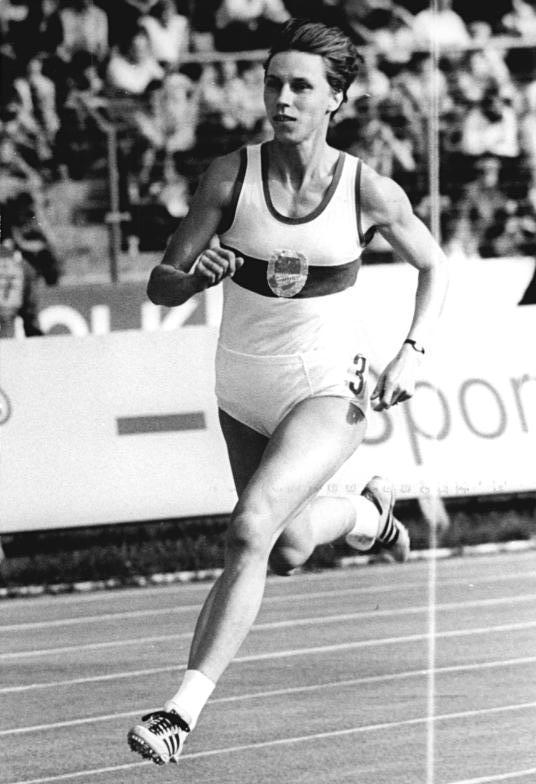
German sprinter Marita Koch won the award a record four times

The Track & Field News Athlete of the Year award is given to track and field athletes by Track & Field News magazine, an American sports magazine. A panel of international track and field experts organized by the magazine selects the winners. The award has been given to men since 1959 and women since 1974.

== Winners ==
Year	Male winner	Nationality	Female winner	Nationality
1959	Martin Lauer	West Germany	Not awarded	
1960	Rafer Johnson	United States	Not awarded	
1961	Ralph Boston	United States	Not awarded	
1962	Peter Snell	New Zealand	Not awarded	
1963	Yang Chuan-Kwang	Taiwan	Not awarded	
1964	Peter Snell	New Zealand	Not awarded	
1965	Ron Clarke	Australia	Not awarded	
1966	Jim Ryun	United States	Not awarded	
1967	Jim Ryun	United States	Not awarded	
1968	Bob Beamon	United States	Not awarded	
1969	Bill Toomey	United States	Not awarded	
1970	Randy Matson	United States	Not awarded	
1971	Rod Milburn	United States	Not awarded	
1972	Lasse Virén	Finland	Not awarded	
1973	Ben Jipcho	Kenya	Not awarded	
1974	Rick Wohlhuter	United States	Irena Szewińska	Poland
1975	John Walker	New Zealand	Faina Melnik	Soviet Union
1976	Alberto Juantorena	Cuba	Tatyana Kazankina	Soviet Union
1977	Alberto Juantorena	Cuba	Rosemarie Ackermann	East Germany
1978	Henry Rono	Kenya	Marita Koch	East Germany
1979	Sebastian Coe	United Kingdom	Marita Koch	East Germany
1980	Edwin Moses	United States	Ilona Slupianek	East Germany
1981	Sebastian Coe	United Kingdom	Evelyn Ashford	United States
1982	Carl Lewis	United States	Marita Koch	East Germany
1983	Carl Lewis	United States	Jarmila Kratochvílová	Czechoslovakia
1984	Carl Lewis	United States	Evelyn Ashford	United States
1985	Saïd Aouita	Morocco	Marita Koch	East Germany
1986	Yuriy Sedykh	Soviet Union	Jackie Joyner-Kersee	United States
1987	Saïd Aouita	Morocco	Jackie Joyner-Kersee	United States
1988	Sergey Bubka	Soviet Union	Florence Griffith-Joyner	United States
1989	Roger Kingdom	United States	Ana Quirot	Cuba
1990	Michael Johnson	United States	Merlene Ottey	Jamaica
1991	Sergey Bubka	Soviet Union	Heike Henkel	Germany
1992	Kevin Young	United States	Heike Drechsler	Germany
1993	Noureddine Morceli	Algeria	Wang Junxia	China
1994	Noureddine Morceli	Algeria	Jackie Joyner-Kersee	United States
1995	Haile Gebrselassie	Ethiopia	Sonia O'Sullivan	Ireland
1996	Michael Johnson	United States	Svetlana Masterkova	Russia
1997	Wilson Kipketer	Denmark	Marion Jones	United States
1998	Haile Gebrselassie	Ethiopia	Marion Jones	United States
1999	Hicham El Guerrouj	Morocco	Gabriela Szabo	Romania
2000	Virgilijus Alekna	Lithuania	Stacy Dragila	United States
2001	Hicham El Guerrouj	Morocco	Stacy Dragila	United States
2002	Hicham El Guerrouj	Morocco	Paula Radcliffe	United Kingdom
2003	Félix Sánchez	Dominican Republic	Maria Mutola	Mozambique
2004	Kenenisa Bekele	Ethiopia	Yelena Isinbayeva	Russia
2005	Kenenisa Bekele	Ethiopia	Yelena Isinbayeva	Russia
2006	Asafa Powell	Jamaica	Sanya Richards	United States
2007	Tyson Gay	United States	Meseret Defar	Ethiopia
2008	Usain Bolt	Jamaica	Tirunesh Dibaba	Ethiopia
2009	Usain Bolt	Jamaica	Sanya Richards	United States
2010	David Rudisha	Kenya	Blanka Vlašić	Croatia
2011	David Rudisha	Kenya	Vivian Cheruiyot	Kenya
2012	David Rudisha	Kenya	Valerie Adams	New Zealand
2013	Bohdan Bondarenko	Ukraine	Valerie Adams	New Zealand
2014	Renaud Lavillenie	France	Anita Włodarczyk	Poland
2015	Ashton Eaton	United States	Genzebe Dibaba	Ethiopia
2016	Wayde van Niekerk	South Africa	Anita Włodarczyk	Poland
2017	Mutaz Essa Barshim	Qatar	Anita Włodarczyk	Poland
2018	Eliud Kipchoge	Kenya	Caster Semenya	South Africa
2019	Karsten Warholm	Norway	Dalilah Muhammad	United States
2020	MVP: Armand Duplantis	Sweden	MVP: Yulimar Rojas	Venezuela
2021	Ryan Crouser	United States	Elaine Thompson-Herah	Jamaica
2022	Armand Duplantis	Sweden	Sydney McLaughlin	United States
2023	Ryan Crouser	United States	Faith Kipyegon	Kenya
2024	Armand Duplantis	Sweden	Sydney McLaughlin-Levrone	United States
2025	Armand Duplantis	Sweden	Beatrice Chebet	Kenya
