= 2009 in the sport of athletics =

2009 in athletics
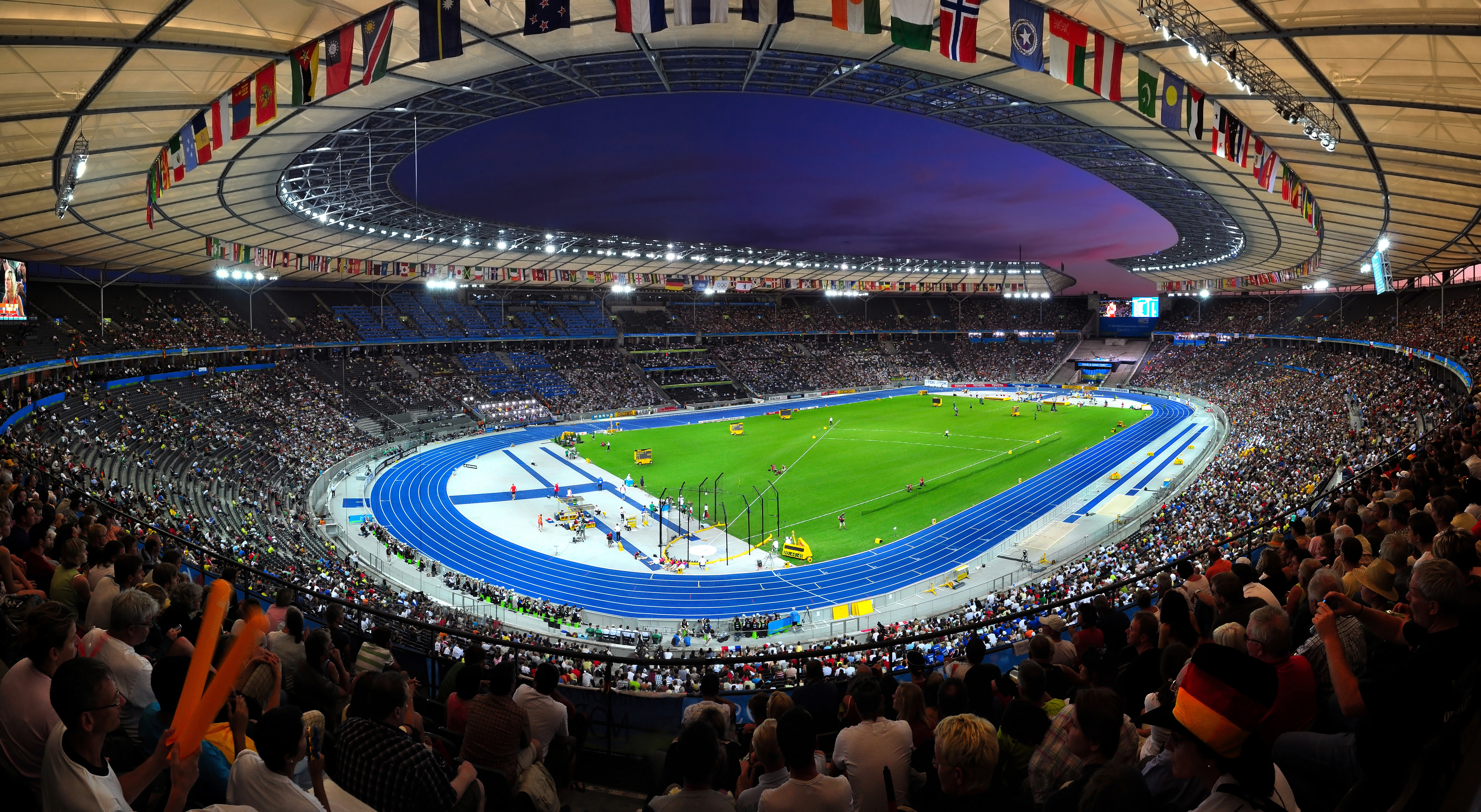
- Major world events: 2009 World Championships
- World records set: 9
- IAAF Athletes of the Year: Usain Bolt; Sanya Richards
- World Marathon Majors winners: Samuel Wanjiru; Irina Mikitenko
- Defunct competitions: IAAF World Athletics Final; IAAF Golden League

This article contains an overview of the year 2009 in athletics.

The major competition of the year was the 2009 World Championships in Athletics. At the event, Usain Bolt reaffirmed himself as one of the world's foremost athletes with world records in the 100 and 200 metres. Caster Semenya won 800 m gold at the championships, but a request that she submit to a gender verification test was made public, sparking widespread controversy and debate. Yelena Isinbayeva, a clear favourite, finished last in the pole vault competition, but rebounded with a world record a week later.

Kenenisa Bekele, Sanya Richards and Isinbayeva were the winners of the last IAAF Golden League jackpot, as the series was replaced by the IAAF Diamond League in 2010.

== Major events ==
=== World ===
- World Championships in Athletics
- World Half Marathon Championships
- World Cross Country Championships
- World Athletics Final
- World Youth Championships
- Golden League
- World Student Games

=== Regional ===
- African Junior Championships
- CAC Championships
- South American Championships
- Pan American Junior Championships
- Jeux de la Francophonie
- Lusophony Games
- European Team Championships
- European Indoor Championships
- European Junior Championships
- European U23 Championships
- European Cross Country Championships
- European Mountain Running Championships
- European Race Walking Cup
- Mediterranean Games
- Asian Championships
- Asian Indoor Games
- East Asian Games
- Southeast Asian Games
- Asian Youth Games
- Maccabiah Games

=== National ===
- China National Games
- German Championships
- Finnish Championships
- Lithuanian Championships
- USA Outdoor Championships

== World records ==
=== Men ===
Event	Athlete	Nation	Performance	Place	Date
100 m	Usain Bolt	Jamaica	9.58	Berlin, Germany	August 16
200 m	Usain Bolt	Jamaica	19.19	Berlin, Germany	August 20
10 km (road)	Micah Kogo	Kenya	27:01	Brunssum, Netherlands	March 29
15 km (road)	Deriba Merga	Ethiopia	41.29+ =WR	Ras Al Khaimah, United Arab Emirates	February 20
30 km (road)	Haile Gebrselassie	Ethiopia	1:27:49+	Berlin Marathon, Germany	September 20
4×1500 metres relay	William Biwott Tanui; Gideon Gathimba; Geoffrey Kipkoech Rono; Augustine Kiprono Choge	Kenya	14:36.23	Brussels, Belgium	September 4

=== Women ===
Event	Athlete	Nation	Performance	Place	Date
5000 m (indoor)	Meseret Defar	Ethiopia	14:24.37	Stockholm, Sweden	February 18
15 km (road)	Tirunesh Dibaba	Ethiopia	46:28	Nijmegen, Netherlands	November 15
Pole vault	Yelena Isinbayeva	Russia	5.06 m	Zürich, Switzerland	August 28
Pole vault (indoor)	Yelena Isinbayeva	Russia	4.97 m	Donetsk, Ukraine	February 15
Pole vault (indoor)	Yelena Isinbayeva	Russia	5.00 m	Donetsk, Ukraine	February 15
Hammer throw	Anita Wlodarczyk	Poland	77.96 m	Berlin, Germany	August 22

== Season's bests ==
Best marks of the year
Event	Men			Women		
Event	Athlete	Mark	Notes	Athlete	Mark	Notes
60 metres	Dwain Chambers (GBR)	6.42 s	AR	Carmelita Jeter (USA)	7.11 s	
100 metres	Usain Bolt (JAM)	9.58 s	WR	Carmelita Jeter (USA)	10.64 s	
200 metres	Usain Bolt (JAM)	19.19 s	WR	Allyson Felix (USA)	21.88 s	
400 metres	LaShawn Merritt (USA)	44.06 s		Sanya Richards (USA)	48.83	
800 metres	David Rudisha (KEN)	1:42.01	AR	Caster Semenya (RSA)	1:55.45	
1500 metres	Augustine Choge (KEN)	3:29.47		Maryam Yusuf Jamal (BHR)	3:56.55	
3000 metres	Eliud Kipchoge (KEN)	7:28.37		Meseret Defar (ETH)	8:26.99 i	
5000 metres	Kenenisa Bekele (ETH)	12:52.32		Meseret Defar (ETH)	14:24.37 i	
10,000 metres	Kenenisa Bekele (ETH)	26:46.31		Meselech Melkamu (ETH)	29:53.80	
60 metres hurdles	Terrence Trammell (USA)	7.37		Lolo Jones (USA)	7.82	
100/110 metres hurdles	Dayron Robles (CUB)	13.04 s		Brigitte Foster-Hylton (JAM)	12.46	
400 metres hurdles	Kerron Clement (USA)	47.91 s		Melaine Walker (JAM)	52.42	
3000 metres steeplechase	Ezekiel Kemboi (KEN)	7:58.85		Marta Domínguez (ESP)	9:07.32	
10 kilometres	Micah Kogo (KEN)	27:01	WR	Mary Keitany (KEN)	31:04	
15 kilometres	Deriba Merga (ETH)	41:29+	WR	Tirunesh Dibaba (ETH)	46:28	WR
20 kilometres	Haile Gebrselassie (ETH); Sammy Kitwara (KEN)	56:48+		Mary Keitany (KEN)	1:02:59+	
Half marathon	Patrick Makau (KEN)	58:52		Mary Keitany (KEN)	1:06:36	
25 kilometres	Haile Gebrselassie (ETH); John Kales (KEN); Samuel Kosgei (KEN)	1:13:09+		Peninah Jerop Arusei (KEN)	1:22:31	
30 kilometres	Haile Gebrselassie (ETH); Samuel Kosgei (KEN)	1:27:49+	WR	Irina Mikitenko (GER); Mara Yamauchi (GBR)	1:41:14	
Marathon	Duncan Kibet (KEN); James Kwambai (KEN)	2:04:27		Irina Mikitenko (GER)	2:22:11	
20 kilometres race walk	Valeriy Borchin (RUS)	1:17:38		Olga Kaniskina (RUS)	1:24:56	
50 kilometres race walk	Sergey Kirdyapkin (RUS)	3:38:35		—		
Pole vault	Steven Hooker (AUS)	6.06 i		Yelena Isinbayeva (RUS)	5.06	
High jump	Ivan Ukhov (RUS)	2.40 i		Blanka Vlašić (CRO)	2.08	
Long jump	Dwight Phillips (USA)	8.74		Brittney Reese (USA)	7.10	
Triple jump	Phillips Idowu (GBR)	17.73		Nadezhda Alekhina (RUS)	15.14	
Shot put	Christian Cantwell (USA)	22.16		Valerie Vili (NZL)	21.07	
Discus throw	Gerd Kanter (EST)	71.64		Yanfeng Li (CHN)	66.40	
Javelin throw	Andreas Thorkildsen (NOR)	91.28		Maria Abakumova (RUS)	68.92	
Hammer throw	Primož Kozmus (SLO)	82.58		Anita Wlodarczyk (POL)	77.96	WR
Heptathlon	—			Jessica Ennis (GBR)	6731	
Decathlon	Trey Hardee (USA)	8790		—		
4×100 metres relay	Jamaica; Steve Mullings; Michael Frater; Usain Bolt; Asafa Powell	37.31		United States; Lauryn Williams; Allyson Felix; Muna Lee; Carmelita Jeter	41.58	
4×400 metres relay	United States; Angelo Taylor; Jeremy Wariner; Kerron Clement; LaShawn Merritt	2:57.86		United States; Debbie Dunn; Allyson Felix; Lashinda Demus; Sanya Richards	3:17.83	

== Awards ==
=== Men ===
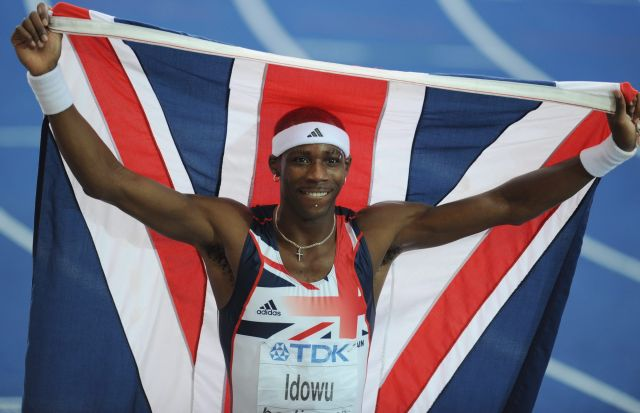
Phillips Idowu - the European Athlete of the year

Award	Winner
IAAF World Athlete of the Year	Usain Bolt (JAM)
Track & Field Athlete of the Year	Usain Bolt (JAM)
European Athlete of the Year	Phillips Idowu (GBR)
European Athletics Rising Star	Christophe Lemaitre (FRA)

=== Women ===
Award	Winner
IAAF World Athlete of the Year	Sanya Richards (USA)
Track & Field Athlete of the Year	Sanya Richards (USA)
European Athlete of the Year	Marta Domínguez (ESP)
European Athletics Rising Star	Karoline Bjerkeli Grøvdal (NOR)

== Doping ==
Incidents of athletes testing positive for banned substances were low-key compared to previous years. The IAAF conducted their largest ever anti-doping program at the 2009 World Championships in Athletics, and Jamel Chatbi and Nigerian hurdler Amaka Ogoegbunam were the only athletes who tested positive. Five Jamaican sprint athletes, including Yohan Blake and Sheri-Ann Brooks, tested positive for Methylhexanamine prior to the world championships. Four of the athletes received three-month bans, while Brooks was cleared on a technicality.

A Brazilian coach, Jayme Netto, admitted that he had administered the banned drug recombinant EPO on five of his athletes without their knowledge. South American champion Lucimar Teodoro was another high-profile Brazilian athlete to be banned.

== Retirements ==
- Kim Collins, 100 m gold medallist at the 2003 World Championships. (returned to competition in 2010)
- Stacy Dragila, Olympic gold medallist, two-time World Champion, and former world record holder in the pole vault.
- Yulia Pechonkina, 2005 World Champion in the 400 m hurdles, and current world record holder.

== Deaths ==
- February 18 — Kamila Skolimowska (26), Polish hammer thrower (born 1982)
- April 6 — Svetlana Ulmasova (56), Uzbekistani long-distance runner (born 1953)
- May 8 — Fons Brydenbach (54), Belgian sprinter (born 1954)
- June 27 — Nanae Nagata (53), Japanese long-distance runner (born 1956)
- October 2 — Jørgen Jensen (65), Danish long-distance runner (born 1944)
- October 25 — Ingeborg Mello (90), Argentine discus thrower and shot putter (born 1919)
