= 2000 in the sport of athletics =

2000 in athletics
- Major world events: Olympic Games
- IAAF Athletes of the Year: Jan Železný; Marion Jones

This article contains an overview of the sport of athletics, including track and field, cross country and road running, in the year 2000.

The primary athletics competition for the 2000 season was at the 2000 Summer Olympics in Sydney, Australia.

== Major events ==
=== World ===
- Olympic Games
- Summer Paralympics
- World Cross Country Championships
- World Half Marathon Championships
- Grand Prix Final
- IAAF Golden League
- World Junior Championships

=== Regional ===
- African Championships
- Asian Championships
- Balkan Games
- Commonwealth Youth Games
- South American Cross Country Championships
- European Indoor Championships
- European Cross Country Championships
- European Cup
- European Race Walking Cup
- Ibero-American Championships

=== National ===
- 2000 Lithuanian Athletics Championships

== World records ==
=== Men ===
  None this year

=== Women ===
| Event | Athlete | Nation | Performance | Meeting | Place | Date |
|---|---|---|---|---|---|---|
| 20,000 metres | Tegla Loroupe | Kenya | 1:05:26.6 | | Borgholzhausen, Germany | 3 September |
| 3000 m steeplechase | Cristina Iloc-Casandra | Romania | 9:43.64 | | Bucharest, Romania | 7 August |
| 3000 m steeplechase | Cristina Iloc-Casandra | Romania | 9:40.20 | | Reims, France | 30 August |
| 4 × 200 metres relay | LaTasha Jenkins; LaTasha Colander-Richardson; Nanceen Perry; Marion Jones | United States | 1:27.46 | | (United States) Philadelphia, USA | 29 April |
| Pole vault | Stacy Dragila | United States | 4.62 m | | (United States) Atlanta, USA | 3 March |
| Pole vault | Stacy Dragila | United States | 4.63 m | | (United States) Sacramento, USA | 23 July |
| Javelin Throw (new) | Trine Hattestad | Norway | 68.22 m | | (Italy) Rome, ITA | 30 June |
| Javelin Throw (new) | Trine Hattestad | Norway | 69.48 m | | (Norway) Oslo, NOR | 28 July |

== Awards ==
=== Men ===
| 2000 TRACK & FIELD AWARDS | ATHLETE |
|---|---|
| IAAF World Athlete of the Year | Jan Železný (CZE) |
| Track & Field Athlete of the Year | Virgilijus Alekna (LTU) |
| European Athlete of the Year Award | Jan Železný (CZE) |
| Best Male Track Athlete ESPY Award | Michael Johnson (USA) |

=== Women ===
| 2000 TRACK & FIELD AWARDS | ATHLETE |
|---|---|
| IAAF World Athlete of the Year | Marion Jones (USA) |
| Track & Field Athlete of the Year | Marion Jones (USA) |
| European Athlete of the Year Award | Trine Hattestad (NOR) |
| Best Female Track Athlete ESPY Award | Marion Jones (USA) |

== Men's Best Year Performances ==
=== 400m Hurdles ===
| RANK | 2000 WORLD BEST PERFORMERS | TIME |
|---|---|---|
| 1. | Angelo Taylor (USA) | 47.50 |
| 2. | Hadi Soua'an Al-Somaily (KSA) | 47.53 |
| 3. | Llewellyn Herbert (RSA) | 47.81 |
| 4. | Eric Thomas (USA) | 47.94 |
| 5. | Samuel Matete (ZAM) | 48.01 |

=== 3,000m Steeplechase ===
| RANK | 2000 WORLD BEST PERFORMERS | TIME |
|---|---|---|
| 1. | Bernard Barmasai (KEN) | 8:02.76 |
| 2. | Brahim Boulami (MAR) | 8:02.90 |
| 3. | Ali Ezzine (MAR) | 8:03.57 |
| 4. | Kipkirui Misoi (KEN) | 8:03.74 |
| 5. | Reuben Kosgei (KEN) | 8:03.92 |

=== Pole Vault ===
| RANK | 2000 WORLD BEST PERFORMERS | HEIGHT |
|---|---|---|
| 1. | Jeff Hartwig (USA) | 6.03 m |
| 2. | Michael Stolle (GER) | 5.95 m |
| 3. | Lawrence Johnson (USA) | 5.90 m |
| 3. | Pavel Gerasimov (RUS) | 5.90 m |
| 3. | Maksim Tarasov (RUS) | 5.90 m |
| 3. | Danny Ecker (GER) | 5.90 m |
| 3. | Nick Hysong (USA) | 5.90 m |

== Women's Best Year Performances ==
=== 100 metres ===
| RANK | 2000 WORLD BEST PERFORMERS | TIME |
|---|---|---|
| 1. | Marion Jones (USA) | 10.78 |
| 2. | Chandra Sturrup (BAH) | 10.86 |
| 3. | Ekateríni Thánou (GRE) | 10.91 |
| 3. | Inger Miller (USA) | 10.91 |
| 5. | Zhanna Block (UKR) | 10.93 |

=== 200 metres ===
| RANK | 2000 WORLD BEST PERFORMERS | TIME |
|---|---|---|
| 1. | Marion Jones (USA) | 21.94 |
| 2. | Inger Miller (USA) | 22.09 |
| 3. | Pauline Davis-Thompson (BAH) | 22.27 |
| 4. | Susanthika Jayasinghe (SRI) | 22.28 |
| 5. | Beverly McDonald (JAM) | 22.35 |

=== Half Marathon ===
| RANK | 2000 WORLD BEST PERFORMERS | TIME |
|---|---|---|
| 1. | Paula Radcliffe (GBR) | 1:07:07 |

=== 100m Hurdles ===
| RANK | 2000 WORLD BEST PERFORMERS | TIME |
|---|---|---|
| 1. | Gail Devers (USA) | 12.33 |
| 2. | Delloreen Ennis-London (JAM) | 12.52 |
| 3. | Glory Alozie (NGR) | 12.54 |
| 4. | Michelle Freeman (JAM) | 12.57 |
| 4. | Melissa Morrison (USA) | 12.57 |

=== 400m Hurdles ===
| RANK | 2000 WORLD BEST PERFORMERS | TIME |
|---|---|---|
| 1. | Irina Privalova (RUS) | 53.02 |
| 2. | Sandra Glover (USA) | 53.33 |
| 3. | Deon Hemmings (JAM) | 53.45 |
| 4. | Nezha Bidouane (MAR) | 53.53 |
| 5. | Daimí Pernía (CUB) | 53.68 |

=== 3,000m Steeplechase ===
| RANK | 2000 WORLD BEST PERFORMERS | TIME |
|---|---|---|
| 1. | Cristina Casandra (ROM) | 9:40.20 |
| 2. | Yekaterina Volkova (RUS) | 9:52.40 |
| 3. | Anzhelika Averkova (UKR) | 9:54.10 |
| 4. | Daniela Petrescu (ROM) | 9:54.86 |
| 5. | Luminita Gogârlea (ROM) | 9:56.99 |

=== High Jump ===
| RANK | 2000 WORLD BEST PERFORMERS | HEIGHT |
|---|---|---|
| 1. | Monica Iagăr (ROM) | 2.02 m |
| 2. | Hestrie Cloete (RSA) | 2.01 m |
| 2. | Yelena Yelesina (RUS) | 2.01 m |
| 2. | Venelina Veneva (BUL) | 2.01 m |
| 2. | Kajsa Bergqvist (SWE) | 2.01 m |

=== Pole Vault ===
| RANK | 2000 WORLD BEST PERFORMERS | HEIGHT |
|---|---|---|
| 1. | Stacy Dragila (USA) | 4.63 m |
| 2. | Anzhela Balakhonova (UKR) | 4.56 m |
| 3. | Tatiana Grigorieva (AUS) | 4.55 m |
| 4. | Kellie Suttle (USA) | 4.53 m |
| 5. | Emma George (AUS) | 4.50 m |
| 5. | Svetlana Feofanova (RUS) | 4.50 m |
| 5. | Daniela Bártová (CZE) | 4.50 m |
| 5. | Yelena Belyakova (RUS) | 4.50 m |
| 5. | Nicole Humbert (GER) | 4.50 m |
| 5. | Vala Flosadóttir (ISL) | 4.50 m |

=== Heptathlon ===
| RANK | 2000 WORLD BEST PERFORMERS | POINTS |
|---|---|---|
| 1. | Eunice Barber (FRA) | 6842 |
| 2. | Denise Lewis (GBR) | 6831 |
| 3. | Yelena Prokhorova (RUS) | 6765 |
| 4. | Natalya Roshchupkina (RUS) | 6633 |
| 5. | Natalya Sazanovich (BLR) | 6527 |

== Deaths ==
- March 7 — Masami Yoshida (41), Japanese javelin thrower (b. 1958)
- August 7 — Mona-Lisa Pursiainen (49), Finnish sprinter (b. 1951)
