= 2011 in the sport of athletics =

2011 in athletics
- Major world events: 2011 World Championships
- World records set: 13
- IAAF Athletes of the Year: Usain Bolt; Sally Pearson
- World Marathon Majors winners: Emmanuel Mutai; Liliya Shobukhova
- New competitions: African XC Championships

In 2011, the foremost athletics event was the 2011 World Championships in Athletics in Daegu. The other major global level competition held in 2011 was the World Cross Country Championships.

The 2011 season marked the re-establishment of the African Cross Country Championships, an event created in response to the change of the World Cross Championships from an annual to a biennial format. It was also the first year since 1992 that the IAAF World Half Marathon Championships was not held, as that competition also switched to a two-year schedule.

== Major events ==
=== World ===
- World Championships in Athletics
- World Cross Country Championships
- IAAF Diamond League
- World Youth Championships in Athletics
- IPC Athletics World Championships
- World Student Games
- Military World Games

=== Regional ===
- CAC Championships
- NACAC Cross Country Championships
- Pan American Games
- Pan American Junior Championships
- South American Championships
- South American Cross Country Championships
- European Indoor Championships
- European Cross Country Championships
- European Team Championships
- European U23 Championships
- European Junior Championships
- European Youth Olympic Festival
- Commonwealth Youth Games
- Asian Championships
- Pan Arab Games
- Southeast Asian Games
- All-Africa Games
- African Junior Championships
- African Cross Country Championships

=== National ===
Dates	Event	City
12–13 February	(Austria) Austrian Indoor Championships	Linz
12–13 February	(Latvia) Latvian Indoor Championships	Kuldīga
18–19 February	(Lithuania) Lithuanian Indoor Championships	Klaipėda
19–21 April	Tonga Championships	Nukuʻalofa
30–31 May	(Armenia) Armenian Championships	Artashat
10–12 June	(Japan) Japanese Championships	Kumagaya
23–26 June	(United States) USA Championships	Eugene
24–25 June	(The Bahamas) Bahamian Championships	Freeport
25–26 June	(Italy) Italian Championships	Turin
23–24 July	(Germany) German Championships	Kassel
23–24 July	(Lithuania) Lithuanian Championships	Kaunas
30–31 July	(Latvia) Latvian Championships	
6–7 August	(Spain) Spanish Championships	Málaga
11–13 August	(Poland) Polish Championships	Bydgoszcz

== World records ==
=== Men ===
Event	Athlete	Nation	Performance	Meeting	Place	Date
Triple jump (indoor)	Teddy Tamgho	France	17.91 m	French Indoor Championships	Aubière, France	20 February
Triple jump (indoor)	Teddy Tamgho	France	17.92 m 17.92 m	European Indoor Championships	Paris, France	6 March
Indoor heptathlon	Ashton Eaton	United States	6568 pts	International Indoor Combined Events Meeting	Tallinn, Estonia	5–6 February
25,000 metres (track) 30,000 metres (track)	Moses Mosop	Kenya	1:12:25.4+ 1:26:47.4	Prefontaine Classic	(United States) Eugene, Oregon, USA	4 June
30 km (road)	Peter Cheruiyot Kirui	Kenya	1:27:37+	2011 Berlin Marathon	Berlin, Germany	25 September
Marathon	Patrick Makau	Kenya	2:03:38	2011 Berlin Marathon	Berlin, Germany	25 September
4 × 100 metres relay	Nesta Carter; Michael Frater; Yohan Blake; Usain Bolt	Jamaica	37.04	World Championships in Athletics	Daegu, South Korea	4 September
50,000 m track walk	Yohann Diniz	France	3:35:27.20	N/A	Reims, France	12 March

=== Women ===
Event	Athlete	Nation	Performance	Meeting	Place	Date
4 × 800 m relay (indoor)	Team Moscow; Aleksandra Bulanova; Yekaterina Martynova; Yelena Kofanova; Anna Balakshina	Russia	8:06.24	Russian Indoor Championships	Moscow, Russia	18 February
20 km road	Mary Keitany	Kenya	1:02:36+	Ras Al Khaimah Half Marathon	(United Arab Emirates) Ras Al Khaimah, UAE	18 February
Half marathon	Mary Keitany	Kenya	1:05:50	Ras Al Khaimah Half Marathon	(United Arab Emirates) Ras Al Khaimah, UAE	18 February
Hammer throw	Betty Heidler	Germany	79.42 m	International Throwing Meeting	Halle, Germany	21 May
20 km road walk	Vera Sokolova	Russia	1:25:08	Russian Race Walking Championships	Sochi, Russia	26 February

== Season's bests ==
Best marks of the year
Event	Men			Women		
Event	Athlete	Mark	Notes	Athlete	Mark	Notes
60 metres	Mike Rodgers (USA)	6.48		LaKya Brookins (USA)	7.09	
100 metres	Usain Bolt (JAM)	9.76		Carmelita Jeter (USA)	10.70	
200 metres	Yohan Blake (JAM)	19.26		Shalonda Solomon (USA)	22.15	
400 metres	LaShawn Merritt (USA)	44.35		Amantle Montsho (BOT)	49.56	^{†}
800 metres	David Rudisha (KEN)	1:41.33		Mariya Savinova (RUS)	1:55.87	
1500 metres	Asbel Kiprop (KEN)	3:30.46		Morgan Uceny (USA)	4:00.06	
Mile run	Haron Keitany (KEN)	3:49.09		Jennifer Simpson (USA)	4:28.60	
3000 metres	Yenew Alamirew (ETH)	7:27.26		Sentayehu Ejigu (ETH)	8:30.26	indoor
5000 metres	Mo Farah (GBR)	12:53.11		Vivian Cheruiyot (KEN)	14:20.87	
10,000 metres	Kenenisa Bekele (ETH)	26:43.16		Sally Jepkosgei Kipyego (KEN)	30:38.35	
60 metres hurdles	David Oliver (USA)	7.37		Kellie Wells (USA)	7.79	
100/110 metres hurdles	David Oliver (USA)	12.94		Sally Pearson (AUS)	12.28	
400 metres hurdles	L.J. van Zyl (RSA)	47.66		Lashinda Demus (USA)	52.47	
3000 metres steeplechase	Brimin Kipruto (KEN)	7:53.64		Yuliya Zaripova (RUS)	9:07.03	
10 kilometres	Micah Kogo (KEN) Leonard Komon (KEN)	27:15		Joyce Chepkirui (KEN)	30:38	
15 kilometres	Leonard Komon (KEN)	41:26		Mary Keitany (KEN)	46:40	
20 kilometres	Deriba Merga (ETH)	56:16		Mary Keitany (KEN)	1:02:36	WR
Half marathon	Zersenay Tadese (ERI)	58:30		Mary Keitany (KEN)	1:05:50	WR
25 kilometres	Mathew Kisorio (KEN)	1:12:13		Mary Keitany (KEN)	1:21:38	
30 kilometres	Peter Cheruiyot Kirui (KEN)	1:27:37	WR	Liliya Shobukhova (RUS)	1:38:23	WR
Marathon	Patrick Makau (KEN)	2:03:38	WR	Liliya Shobukhova (RUS)	2:18:20	
20 kilometres race walk	Wang Zhen (CHN)	1:18:30		Vera Sokolova (RUS)	1:25:08	WR
50 kilometres race walk	Sergey Bakulin (RUS)	3:38:46		—		
Pole vault	Renaud Lavillenie (FRA)	6.03 m	indoor	Jennifer Suhr (USA)	4.91 m	
High jump	Ivan Ukhov (RUS)	2.38 m	indoor	Anna Chicherova (RUS)	2.07 m	NR
Long jump	Mitchell Watt (AUS)	8.54 m		Brittney Reese (USA)	7.19 m	
Triple jump	Christian Taylor (USA)	17.96 m		Yargelis Savigne (CUB) Caterine Ibargüen (COL)	14.99 m	
Shot put	Dylan Armstrong (CAN)	22.21 m		Valerie Adams (NZL)	21.24 m	
Discus throw	Zoltán Kővágó (HUN)	69.50 m		Li Yanfeng (CHN)	67.98 m	^{†}
Javelin throw	Andreas Thorkildsen (NOR)	90.61 m		Barbora Špotáková (CZE)	71.58 m	^{†}
Hammer throw	Krisztián Pars (HUN)	81.89 m		Betty Heidler (GER)	79.42 m	WR
Pentathlon	—			Antoinette Nana Djimou Ida (FRA)	4723 pts	
Heptathlon	Ashton Eaton (USA)	6568 pts	WR	Jessica Ennis-Hill (GBR)	6790 pts	^{†}
Decathlon	Ashton Eaton (USA)	8729 pts		—		
4 × 100 metres relay	Jamaica; Nesta Carter; Michael Frater; Yohan Blake; Usain Bolt	37.04	WR	United States; Bianca Knight; Allyson Felix; Marshevet Myers; Carmelita Jeter	41.56	
4 × 400 metres relay	United States; Greg Nixon; Jamaal Torrance; Michael Berry; LaShawn Merritt	2:58.82		United States; Sanya Richards-Ross; Allyson Felix; Jessica Beard; Francena McCorory		3:18.09

- ^{†} = Russia's Anastasiya Kapachinskaya ran 49.35 in July in at the Russian National Championships in Cheboksary, but this was annulled after she later failed a drug test.
- ^{†} = Russia's Mariya Abakumova threw 71.99, a championship record, at the 2011 World Championships in Athletics, but this was annulled after she later failed a drug test.
- ^{†} = Croatia's Sandra Perković had a throw of 69.99 m in June in Varaždin, but this was annulled after she later failed a drug test.
- ^{†} = Russia's Tatyana Chernova accumulated 6880 points at the 2011 World Championships in Athletics, but this was annulled after she later failed a drug test.

== Awards ==
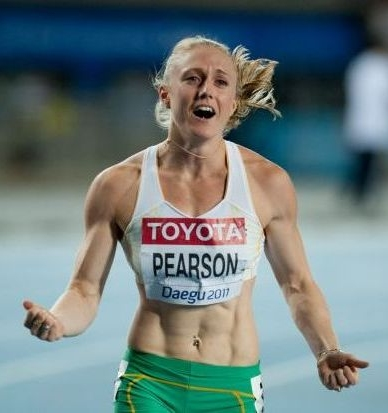
Australia's Sally Pearson was the women's IAAF Athlete of the Year.

=== Men ===
Award	Winner
IAAF World Athlete of the Year	Usain Bolt (JAM)
Track & Field Athlete of the Year	David Rudisha (KEN)
European Athlete of the Year	Mo Farah (GBR)
European Athletics Rising Star	David Storl (GER)

=== Women ===
Award	Winner
IAAF World Athlete of the Year	Sally Pearson (AUS)
Track & Field Athlete of the Year	Vivian Cheruiyot (KEN)
European Athlete of the Year	Mariya Savinova (RUS)
European Athletics Rising Star	Jodie Williams (GBR)

== Deaths ==
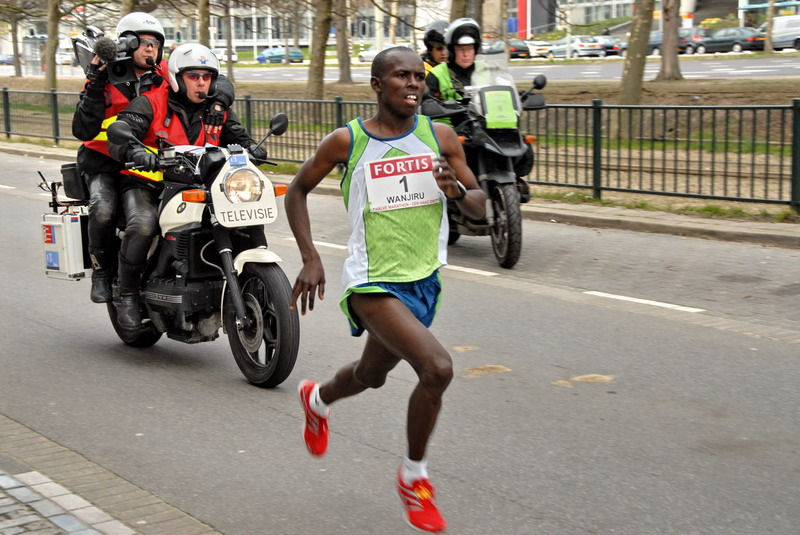
The 2008 Olympic marathon champion Samuel Wanjiru died in May.

- 3 January – Zbigniew Jaremski (61), 400 m relay silver medallist at the 1976 Olympics
- 16 January – Stefka Yordanova (64), 1973 European indoor champion over 800 m
- 3 February – Robert Young (95), 400 m relay silver medallist at the 1936 Olympics
- 5 February – Albert Yator (17), Kenyan world junior steeplechase medalist
- 13 February – Inese Jaunzeme (78), javelin thrower and Latvia's first Olympic champion
- 19 February – Ollie Matson (70), 400 m runner and 1952 Olympic medallist
- 25 February – Peter Hildreth (82), 1950 European Championships medallist in the hurdles
- 14 March – Eduard Gushchin (60), 1968 Olympic medallist in the shot put
- 19 April – Grete Waitz (57), distance runner and world champion and record holder in the marathon
- 16 May – Samuel Wanjiru (24), first Kenyan to win the Olympic marathon and a former half marathon world record holder
- 28 May – Romuald Klim (78), 1964 Olympic champion and former world record holder in the hammer throw
- 30 May – Ricky Bruch, (64) former world record holder in the discus throw
- 6 June – Benjamín González (53), World and European indoor medallist over 400 and 800 metres
- 10 June – Cosimo Caliandro (29), 3000 metres gold medallist at the 2007 European Indoors
- 10 July – Ragnar Lundberg (86), pole vaulter and 1950 European champion
- 12 July – Kurt Lundquist (85), 400 m runner and 1948 Olympic relay medallist
- 17 August – Pierre Quinon (49), 1984 Olympic pole vault champion
- 2 October – Vera Popkova (68), 1971 European indoor champion over 400 metres
- 13 October – Abdoulaye Seye (77), sprinter and 1960 Olympic medallist over 200 m
- 12 December – Sunday Bada (42), 1997 World indoor champion over 400 metres and Olympic relay gold medallist
