= Gwen Torrence =

American sprinter (born 1965)

Personal information
- Born: June 12, 1965 (age 61) Atlanta, Georgia, U.S.
- Height: 5 ft 7 1/2 in (171 cm)
- Weight: 125 lb (57 kg)

Sport
- Country: United States
- Sport: Track and field
- College team: Georgia Bulldogs
Medal record
Women's athletics
Representing the United States
Olympic Games
| Gold medal – first place | 1992 Barcelona | 200 m |
| Gold medal – first place | 1992 Barcelona | 4 × 100 m relay |
| Gold medal – first place | 1996 Atlanta | 4 × 100 m relay |
| Silver medal – second place | 1992 Barcelona | 4 × 400 m relay |
| Bronze medal – third place | 1996 Atlanta | 100 m |
World Championships
| Gold medal – first place | 1993 Stuttgart | 4 × 400 m relay |
| Gold medal – first place | 1995 Gothenburg | 100 m |
| Gold medal – first place | 1995 Gothenburg | 4 × 100 m relay |
| Silver medal – second place | 1991 Tokyo | 100 m |
| Silver medal – second place | 1991 Tokyo | 200 m |
| Silver medal – second place | 1993 Stuttgart | 200 m |
| Silver medal – second place | 1993 Stuttgart | 4 × 100 m relay |
| Bronze medal – third place | 1993 Stuttgart | 100 m |
Pan American Games
| Gold medal – first place | 1987 Indianapolis | 200 m |
Summer Universiade
| Gold medal – first place | 1985 Kobe | 4 x 100 m relay |
| Gold medal – first place | 1987 Zagreb | 100 m |
| Gold medal – first place | 1987 Zagreb | 200 m |
| Gold medal – first place | 1987 Zagreb | 4 x 100 m relay |
- Updated on February 9, 2014

Gwendolyn Lenna Torrence (born June 12, 1965) is a retired American sprinter and Olympic champion. She was born in Decatur, Georgia. She attended Columbia High School and the University of Georgia. She was offered a scholarship because of her athletic abilities, but she said she wasn't interested because she initially wanted to become a beautician. From the persuasion from her coaches and family, she chose to enroll to the University of Georgia.

In the early 1990s, Gwen Torrence was one of the best sprinters in the world, winning five Olympic medals, and three gold.

Torrence won medals at the Summer Olympics, Outdoor & Indoor World Championships, Pan American Games, Goodwill Games, and Summer Universiade.

In 1988, Torrence achieved a tie with Evelyn Ashford in the 55 m race at the U.S. national indoor championships. She also had many battles both on the track and in the press with Florence Griffith Joyner.

In the 200 m at the 1995 World Championships, she was disqualified for stepping out of her lane after finishing first. This left her idol, Merlene Ottey, to be promoted to first place.

In 2000 she was inducted into the Georgia Sports Hall of Fame.

== International competitions ==
| Year | Competition | Venue | Position | Event | Notes |
|---|---|---|---|---|---|
| 1985 | Summer Universiade | Kobe, Japan | 1st | 4 × 100 m relay | |
| 1987 | Pan American Games | Indianapolis, United States | 1st | 200 m | |
| 1987 | Pan American Games | Indianapolis, United States | 1st | 4 × 100 m relay | |
| 1987 | Summer Universiade | Zagreb, Yugoslavia | 1st | 100 m | |
| 1987 | Summer Universiade | Zagreb, Yugoslavia | 1st | 200 m | |
| 1988 | Olympic Games | Seoul, South Korea | 5th | 100 m | |
| 1988 | Olympic Games | Seoul, South Korea | 6th | 200 m | |
| 1989 | World Indoor Championships | Budapest, Hungary | 2nd | 60 m | |
| 1991 | World Championships | Tokyo, Japan | 2nd | 100 m | |
| 1991 | World Championships | Tokyo, Japan | 2nd | 200 m | |
| 1992 | Olympic Games | Barcelona, Spain | 4th | 100 m | |
| 1992 | Olympic Games | Barcelona, Spain | 1st | 200 m | |
| 1992 | Olympic Games | Barcelona, Spain | 1st | 4 × 100 m relay | |
| 1992 | Olympic Games | Barcelona, Spain | 2nd | 4 × 400 m relay | |
| 1993 | World Championships | Stuttgart, Germany | 3rd | 100 m | |
| 1993 | World Championships | Stuttgart, Germany | 2nd | 200 m | |
| 1993 | World Championships | Stuttgart, Germany | 2nd | 4 × 100 m relay | |
| 1993 | World Championships | Stuttgart, Germany | 1st | 4 × 400 m relay | |
| 1994 | Goodwill Games | Saint Petersburg, Russia | 1st | 100 m | |
| 1994 | Goodwill Games | Saint Petersburg, Russia | 1st | 200 m | |
| 1994 | Goodwill Games | Saint Petersburg, Russia | 1st | 4 × 100 m relay | |
| 1995 | World Championships | Gothenburg, Sweden | 1st | 100 m | |
| 1995 | World Championships | Gothenburg, Sweden | 1st | 4 × 100 m relay | |
| 1996 | Olympic Games | Atlanta, United States | 3rd | 100 m | |
| 1996 | Olympic Games | Atlanta, United States | 1st | 4 × 100 m relay | |

== National titles ==
- USA Outdoor Track and Field Championships
  - 100 m: 1995
  - 200 m: 1988, 1993, 1995
- USA Indoor Track and Field Championships
  - 55 m: 1989
  - 60 m: 1994, 1995, 1996
  - 200 m: 1994, 1996

== Personal bests ==
Outdoor

- 100-meter dash – 10.82 (1994)
- 200-meter dash – 21.72 (1992)
- 400-meter dash – 49.64 (1992)

Indoor

- 50-meter dash – 6.07 (1996)
- 55-meter dash – 6.56 (1987)
- 60-meter dash – 7.02 (1996)

== Awards ==
- World Athletics Awards

World Athlete of the Year (Women)：1995

Awards
| Preceded by Le Jingyi | United Press International; Athlete of the Year; 1995 | Succeeded by none |
| Preceded by Gail Devers | Women's Track & Field ESPY Award; 1995 | Succeeded by Kim Batten |
Sporting positions
| Preceded by Merlene Ottey | Women's 200m Best Year Performance; 1992; 1994–1995 | Succeeded by Merlene Ottey; Marie-José Pérec & Mary Onyali |
