= Best Male Track Athlete ESPY Award =

Annual athletic award (1993–2006)

The Best Male Track Athlete ESPY Award was presented annually between 1993 and 2006 to the male track and field athlete, irrespective of nationality, adjudged to be the best in a given calendar year. Beginning in 2007, this award was combined with the parallel Best Female Track Athlete ESPY Award into the single Best Track and Field Athlete ESPY Award.

Between 1993 and 2004, the award voting panel comprised variously fans; sportswriters and broadcasters, sports executives, and retired sportspersons, termed collectively experts; and ESPN personalities, but balloting thereafter was exclusively by fans over the Internet from amongst choices selected by the ESPN Select Nominating Committee.

Through the 2001 iteration of the ESPY Awards, ceremonies were conducted in February of each year to honor achievements over the previous calendar year; awards presented thereafter were conferred in June and reflected performance from the June previous.

== List of winners ==
Year	Athlete	Nation represented	Event(s) contested
1993	Kevin Young	United States	400-metre hurdles
1994	Michael Johnson	United States	200 metres, 400 metres, 4 × 400-metre relay
1995	Dennis Mitchell	United States	100 metres, 4 × 100-metre relay
1996	Michael Johnson	United States	200 metres, 400 metres, 4 × 400-metre relay
1997	Michael Johnson	United States	200 metres, 400 metres, 4 × 400-metre relay
1998	Wilson Kipketer	Denmark	800 metres
1999	Maurice Greene	United States	100 metres, 200 metres, 4 × 100-metre relay
2000	Michael Johnson	United States	200 metres, 400 metres, 4 × 400-metre relay
2001	Maurice Greene	United States	100 metres, 200 metres, 4 × 100-metre relay
2002	Maurice Greene	United States	100 metres, 200 metres, 4 × 100-metre relay
2003	Tim Montgomery	United States	100 metres, 200 metres, 4 × 100-metre relay
2004	Tom Pappas	United States	Decathlon
2005	No award presented		
2006	Justin Gatlin	United States	100 metres, 200 metres
2007	Jeremy Wariner	United States	400 metres

== See also ==
- Best Female Track Athlete ESPY Award
- European Athlete of the Year Award
- IAAF Athlete of the Year Award
- IAAF Golden League
