= Alesia Turava =

Belarusian middle-distance runner

Alesia Turava (Belarusian: Алеся Турава; born 6 December 1979) is a Belarusian middle-distance runner. She is a former world record holder in 3000 metre steeplechase with 9:16.51 minutes, achieved in Gdansk on 27 July 2002. Still, Turava mostly competes over 1500 metres. Her sister, Ryta Turava, also competes in the sport of athletics (20 km race walk).

== Biography ==
She won the gold medal in the inaugural 3000 m steeplechase for women held at the 2006 European Athletics Championships in Gothenburg. Her sister Ryta Turava is a successful race walker.

== Achievements ==
Year	Competition	Venue	Position	Event	Notes
Representing Belarus
1998	World Junior Championships	Annecy, France	13th (h)	1500m	4:21.72
1999	European U23 Championships	Gothenburg, Sweden	5th	1500m	4:13.79
2001	World Indoor Championships	Lisbon, Portugal	6th	1500 m	4:13.67
2001	European U23 Championships	Amsterdam, Netherlands	1st	1500m	4:09.71
2001	World Championships	Edmonton, Canada	7th	1500 m	4:07.25
2002	European Indoor Championships	Vienna, Austria	3rd	1500 m	4:07.69
2002	European Championships	Munich, Germany	7th	1500 m	4:06.64
2003	World Indoor Championships	Birmingham, England	7th	1500 m	4:08.20
2004	World Indoor Championships	Budapest, Hungary	7th	1500 m	4:09.81
2005	European Indoor Championships	Madrid, Spain	5th	1500 m	4:08.81
2006	European Championships	Gothenburg, Sweden	1st	3000 m steeple	9:26.05

== Personal bests ==
- 1500 metres - 3:59.89 min (2002)
- 3000 metres - 8:32.89 min (2001)
- 5000 metres - 15:23.84 min (2000)
- 3000 metre steeplechase - 9:16.51 min (2002)

Records
Preceded by (Poland) Justyna Bak	Women's 3000 m Steeplechase; World Record Holder; June 12, 2002 – August 10, 2003	Succeeded by (Russia) Gulnara Samitova-Galkina
Sporting positions
Preceded by (Poland) Justyna Bak	Women's 3000 m Steeplechase; Best Year Performance; 2002	Succeeded by (Russia) Gulnara Samitova-Galkina
