= Justyna Bąk =

Polish runner

Justyna Bąk (born August 1, 1974) is a long-distance runner from Poland, who specializes mainly in the 3000 metres steeplechase. She is a four-time national champion in the women's 5,000 metres, and a former world record holder in the 3,000 metres steeple. She was born in Biłgoraj.

Bąk won the 2003 edition of the Cross Internacional de Venta de Baños.

Records
Preceded by (Romania) Cristina Casandra	women's 3,000m steeplechase world record holder June 5, 2002 – June 12, 2002	Succeeded by (Belarus) Alesia Turava
Sporting positions
Preceded by (Romania) Cristina Casandra	women's 3,000m steeplechase best year performance 2001	Succeeded by (Belarus) Alesia Turava
