= Alina Cucerzan =

Romanian middle-distance runner

Personal information
- Full name: Claudia Alina Cucerzan
- Nationality: Romanian
- Born: 28 July 1974 (age 51)

Sport
- Sport: Middle-distance running
- Event: 1500 metres

Claudia Alina Cucerzan (born 28 July 1974) is a Romanian middle-distance runner. She competed in the women's 1500 metres at the 2004 Summer Olympics.
