= European Athlete of the Year =

Athletics award in Europe

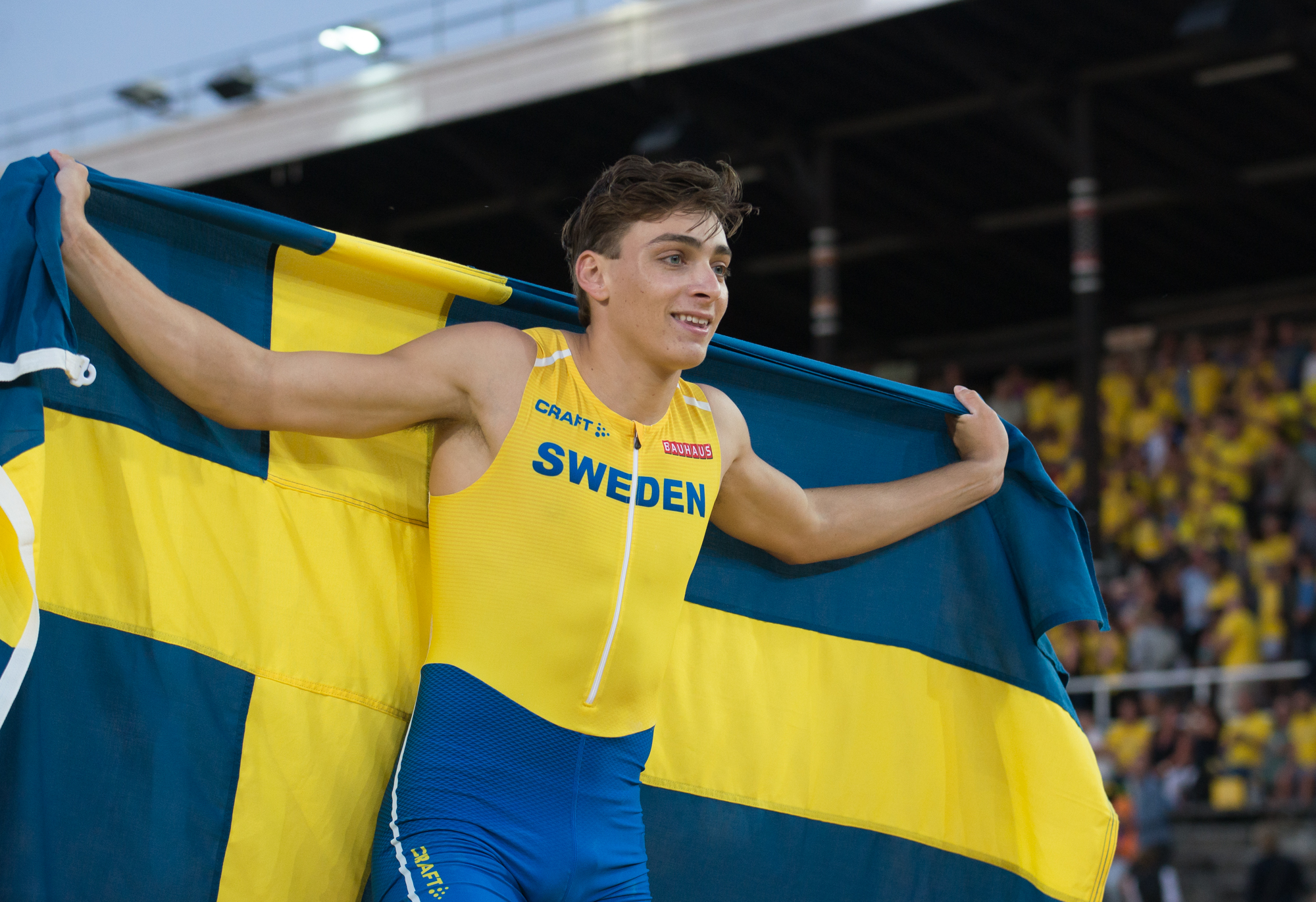
Pole vaulter Armand Duplantis was the men's Rising Star of the Year in 2018 and men's Athlete of the Year in 2022, 2024, and 2025.

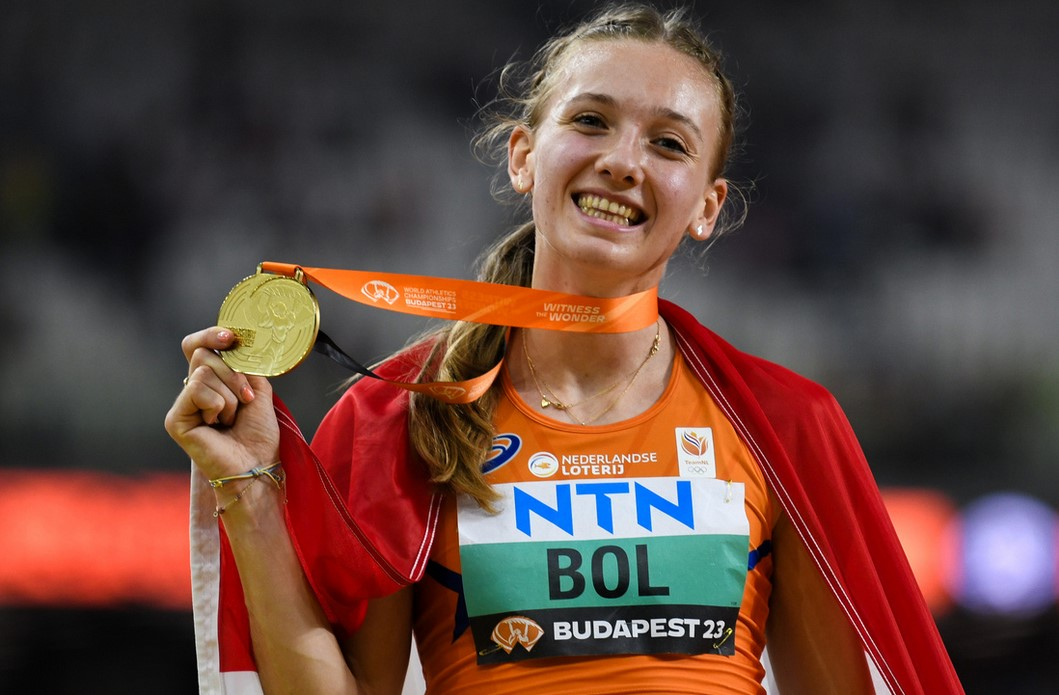
Hurdler/sprinter Femke Bol was the women's Rising Star of the Year in 2021 and women's Athete of the Year in 2022, 2023, and 2025.

The European Athlete of the Year award is an annual prize for sportspeople from Europe participating in athletics, including track and field, road running, and cross country running competitions. The election has been organised by the European Athletic Association (EAA), the European governing body for the sport of athletics, since 1993.

Each year, a shortlist is created by selecting the top European athlete in each event, based upon performances at the year's major championships. Only in exceptional circumstances will more than one athlete be shortlisted per event. Athletes who have served a doping ban of two years or more are ineligible. Via the EAA website, fans, media, and members of the EAA federations are allowed to vote for five male and five female athletes on the list, with athletes receiving one to five points based on their ranking. A panel of experts also cast their votes. The votes of each of the four groups comprises 25% of the athletes' total scores, and the male and female athletes with the highest combined points totals win.

In 2007, a separate European Athletics Rising Star of the Year award was established for athletes under 23 years of age as a way of acknowledging young competitors' achievements on their way to becoming senior athletes.

Both awards are presented during the annual Golden Tracks gala of the EEA. Waterford Crystal sponsored the event from 2002–2008 and Mondo, a manufacturer of track and field equipment and facilities, sponsored the 2009 presentation.

== Winner statistics ==
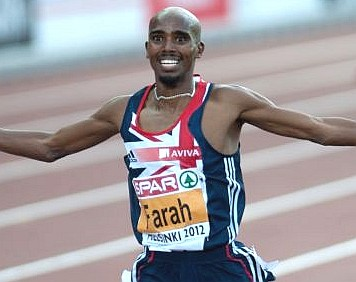
Long-distance runner Mo Farah won the main award three times, in 2011, 2012, and 2016.

British long-distance runner Mo Farah won the men's award three times and was the first to do so. He was followed by Swedish pole vaulter Armand Duplantis. Dutch sprinter/hurdler Femke Bol was the first to win the women's award three times. British triple jumper Jonathan Edwards with his Swedish rival Christian Olsson, Norwegian hurdler Karsten Warholm, Norwegian middle/long-distance runner Jakob Ingebrigtsen have won the men's award twice, while Sweden's heptathlete Carolina Klüft, Russian pole vaulter Yelena Isinbayeva, Croatian high jumper Blanka Vlašić, and Dutch sprinter Dafne Schippers have won the women's award twice each.

Warholm, Ingebrigtsen, Duplantis and Bol have each won a Rising Star award followed by multiple senior awards. Three athletes have won the Rising Star trophy followed by one senior award: sprinter Christophe Lemaitre of France, Great Britain's heptathlete Jessica Ennis-Hill and Ukrainian's high jumper Yaroslava Mahuchikh.

For the first time in award history, the men’s European Athlete of the Year trophy in 2022 was awarded jointly to Duplantis and Ingebrigtsen who both won three major gold medals and revised the record books in 2022. Duplantis and Ingebrigtsen were also jointly named men’s Rising Star in 2018, a first in the award history too.

Carolina Klüft and Christophe Lemaitre were the youngest European Athletes of the Year so far. They were only 20 when winning this accolade in 2003 and 2010 respectively.

== Athlete of the Year winners ==
European Athlete of the Year winners
Year	Men	Women	Ref.
1993	(United Kingdom) Linford Christie	(United Kingdom) Sally Gunnell	
1994	(United Kingdom) Colin Jackson	(Russia) Irina Privalova	
1995	(United Kingdom) Jonathan Edwards (1/2)	(Republic of Ireland) Sonia O'Sullivan	
1996	(Czech Republic) Jan Železný (1/2)	(Russia) Svetlana Masterkova	
1997	(Denmark) Wilson Kipketer	(Germany) Astrid Kumbernuss	
1998	(United Kingdom) Jonathan Edwards (2/2)	(France) Christine Arron	
1999	(Czech Republic) Tomáš Dvořák	(Romania) Gabriela Szabo	
2000	(Czech Republic) Jan Železný (2/2)	(Norway) Trine Hattestad	
2001	(Switzerland) André Bucher	(Austria) Stephanie Graf	
2002	(United Kingdom) Dwain Chambers	(Turkey) Süreyya Ayhan	
2003	(Sweden) Christian Olsson (1/2)	(Sweden) Carolina Klüft (1/2)	
2004	(Sweden) Christian Olsson (2/2)	(United Kingdom) Kelly Holmes	
2005	(Lithuania) Virgilijus Alekna	(Russia) Yelena Isinbayeva (1/2)	
2006	(Portugal) Francis Obikwelu	(Sweden) Carolina Klüft (2/2)	
2007	(Finland) Tero Pitkämäki	(Croatia) Blanka Vlašić (1/2)	
2008	(Norway) Andreas Thorkildsen	(Russia) Yelena Isinbayeva (2/2)	
2009	(United Kingdom) Phillips Idowu	(Spain) Marta Domínguez	
2010	(France) Christophe Lemaitre	(Croatia) Blanka Vlašić (2/2)	
2011	(United Kingdom) Mo Farah (1/3)	(Russia) Mariya Savinova	
2012	(United Kingdom) Mo Farah (2/3)	(United Kingdom) Jessica Ennis	
2013	(Ukraine) Bohdan Bondarenko	(Czech Republic) Zuzana Hejnová	
2014	(France) Renaud Lavillenie	(Netherlands) Dafne Schippers (1/2)	
2015	(United Kingdom) Greg Rutherford	(Netherlands) Dafne Schippers (2/2)	
2016	(United Kingdom) Mo Farah (3/3)	(Spain) Ruth Beitia	
2017	(Germany) Johannes Vetter	(Greece) Katerina Stefanidi	
2018	(France) Kevin Mayer	(United Kingdom) Dina Asher-Smith	
2019	(Norway) Karsten Warholm (1/2)	(Russia) Mariya Lasitskene	
2020	not awarded (Note: Not awarded due to the COVID-19 pandemic)		
2021	(Norway) Karsten Warholm (2/2)	(Netherlands) Sifan Hassan	
2022	(Sweden) Armand Duplantis(1/3)	(Netherlands) Femke Bol (1/3)	
2022	(Norway) Jakob Ingebrigtsen (1/2)	(Netherlands) Femke Bol (1/3)	
2023	(Norway) Jakob Ingebrigtsen (2/2)	(Netherlands) Femke Bol (2/3)	
2024	(Sweden) Armand Duplantis (2/3)	(Ukraine) Yaroslava Mahuchikh	
2025	(Sweden) Armand Duplantis (3/3)	(Netherlands) Femke Bol (3/3)	
2026	(Italy) Gianmarco Tamberi	(Switzerland) Audrey Werro	

== Rising Star of the Year winners ==
European Athletics Rising Star of the Year winners
Year	Men	Women	Ref.
2007	(Italy) Andrew Howe	(United Kingdom) Jessica Ennis	
2008	(Germany) Raphael Holzdeppe	(United Kingdom) Stephanie Twell	
2009	(France) Christophe Lemaitre	(Norway) Karoline Bjerkeli Grøvdal	
2010	(France) Teddy Tamgho	(Croatia) Sandra Perković	
2011	(Germany) David Storl	(United Kingdom) Jodie Williams	
2012	(Czech Republic) Pavel Maslák	(Sweden) Angelica Bengtsson	
2013	(Serbia) Emir Bekrić	(Iceland) Aníta Hinriksdóttir	
2014	(United Kingdom) Adam Gemili	(Russia) Mariya Kuchina	
2015	(Poland) Konrad Bukowiecki	(Switzerland) Noemi Zbären	
2016	(Germany) Max Heß	(Belgium) Nafissatou Thiam	
2017	(Norway) Karsten Warholm	(Ukraine) Yuliya Levchenko	
2018	(Sweden) Armand Duplantis	(Belarus) Elvira Herman	
2018	(Norway) Jakob Ingebrigtsen	(Belarus) Elvira Herman	
2019	(Germany) Niklas Kaul	(Ukraine) Yaroslava Mahuchikh	
2020	not awarded		
2021	(France) Sasha Zhoya	(Netherlands) Femke Bol	
2022	(Lithuania) Mykolas Alekna	(Greece) Elina Tzengko	
2023	(Italy) Mattia Furlani	(Serbia) Angelina Topić	
2024	(Netherlands) Niels Laros	(Serbia) Adriana Vilagoš	
2025	(Poland) Hubert Trościanka	(Switzerland) Audrey Werro	
2026	(Czech Republic) Michal Rada	(Bulgaria) Viktoria Angelova	

== See also ==
- European Athlete of the Month
