= TCU Horned Frogs track and field =

College track and field team

- University: Texas Christian University
- Head coach: Khadevis Robinson
- Conference: Big 12
- Location: Fort Worth, Texas
- Outdoor track: Lowdon Track and Field Complex
- Nickname: Horned Frogs
- Colors: Purple and white

The TCU Horned Frogs track and field team is the track and field program that represents Texas Christian University. The Horned Frogs compete in NCAA Division I as a member of the Big 12 Conference. The team is based in Fort Worth, Texas, at the Lowdon Track and Field Complex.

The program is coached by Khadevis Robinson. The track and field program officially encompasses four teams because the NCAA considers men's and women's indoor track and field and outdoor track and field as separate sports.

Jamaican sprinter Ray Stewart won five NCAA individual titles for the Horned Frogs from 1987 to 1989. In 2022, TCU coach Khadevis Robinson replaced Darryl Anderson, who had previously coached the programs for 18 seasons but was fired.

In 2005, the TCU track and field teams were found to have violated NCAA rules. The violations included unauthorized athlete payments and academic fraud, as an assistant coach was found to have taken a final exam and purchased essays on behalf of a student-athlete. As a result, placings from nine affected athletes that spanned between 1997 and 2004 were vacated, and the program was not scored as a team (although individuals were still allowed to compete) at post-season competitions during the 2005-2006 and 2006-2007 seasons. The program also withheld itself from competing in 2004-2005 season championships. As a result of the decision, publications have sometimes considered all of the TCU men's team postseason marks from 1997 to 2004 to have been vacated.

== Postseason ==
As of August 2025, a total of 51 men and 18 women have achieved individual first-team All-American status for the team at the Division I men's outdoor, women's outdoor, men's indoor, or women's indoor national championships (using the modern criteria of top-8 placing regardless of athlete nationality).

First team NCAA All-Americans
| Team | Championships | Name | Event | Place | Ref. |
|---|---|---|---|---|---|
| Men's | 1929 Outdoor | Cy Leland | 100 meters | 4th | |
| Men's | 1929 Outdoor | Cy Leland | 200 meters | 4th | |
| Men's | 1930 Outdoor | Cy Leland | 100 meters | 6th | |
| Men's | 1930 Outdoor | Cy Leland | 200 meters | 2nd | |
| Men's | 1930 Outdoor | Red Oliver | 220 yards hurdles | >6th | |
| Men's | 1933 Outdoor | Charles Casper | 110 meters hurdles | 5th | |
| Men's | 1956 Outdoor | Bill Curtis | 110 meters hurdles | 6th | |
| Men's | 1961 Outdoor | Bobby Bernard | 110 meters hurdles | 5th | |
| Men's | 1961 Outdoor | Jackie Upton | High jump | 7th | |
| Men's | 1963 Outdoor | Jackie Upton | High jump | 4th | |
| Men's | 1973 Outdoor | David Hardin | 4 × 400 meters relay | 5th | |
| Men's | 1973 Outdoor | Gary Peacock | 4 × 400 meters relay | 5th | |
| Men's | 1973 Outdoor | Sam McKinney | 4 × 400 meters relay | 5th | |
| Men's | 1973 Outdoor | Lee Williams | 4 × 400 meters relay | 5th | |
| Men's | 1974 Outdoor | Bill Collins | 100 meters | 7th | |
| Men's | 1974 Outdoor | Bill Collins | 4 × 100 meters relay | 5th | |
| Men's | 1974 Outdoor | Gary Peacock | 4 × 100 meters relay | 5th | |
| Men's | 1974 Outdoor | Phil Delancy | 4 × 100 meters relay | 5th | |
| Men's | 1974 Outdoor | Lee Williams | 4 × 100 meters relay | 5th | |
| Men's | 1975 Indoor | Bill Collins | 55 meters | 5th | |
| Men's | 1975 Outdoor | Glen Norris | 4 × 100 meters relay | 4th | |
| Men's | 1975 Outdoor | Sam McKinney | 4 × 100 meters relay | 4th | |
| Men's | 1975 Outdoor | Phil Delancy | 4 × 100 meters relay | 4th | |
| Men's | 1975 Outdoor | Bill Collins | 4 × 100 meters relay | 4th | |
| Men's | 1976 Outdoor | Michael Milton | 4 × 100 meters relay | 6th | |
| Men's | 1976 Outdoor | Jerry Thomas | 4 × 100 meters relay | 6th | |
| Men's | 1976 Outdoor | Phil Delancy | 4 × 100 meters relay | 6th | |
| Men's | 1976 Outdoor | Cleo Boone | 4 × 100 meters relay | 6th | |
| Men's | 1982 Outdoor | Phil Epps | 200 meters | 5th | |
| Men's | 1983 Outdoor | Phil Epps | 200 meters | 5th | |
| Men's | 1983 Outdoor | Phil Epps | 4 × 100 meters relay | 6th | |
| Men's | 1983 Outdoor | David Walker | 4 × 100 meters relay | 6th | |
| Men's | 1983 Outdoor | James Richard | 4 × 100 meters relay | 6th | |
| Men's | 1983 Outdoor | James Maness | 4 × 100 meters relay | 6th | |
| Men's | 1983 Outdoor | Allen Ingraham | 4 × 400 meters relay | 1st | |
| Men's | 1983 Outdoor | James Richard | 4 × 400 meters relay | 1st | |
| Men's | 1983 Outdoor | Keith Burnett | 4 × 400 meters relay | 1st | |
| Men's | 1983 Outdoor | David Walker | 4 × 400 meters relay | 1st | |
| Men's | 1984 Indoor | James Richard | 4 × 400 meters relay | 3rd | |
| Men's | 1984 Indoor | Keith Burnett | 4 × 400 meters relay | 3rd | |
| Men's | 1984 Indoor | James Maness | 4 × 400 meters relay | 3rd | |
| Men's | 1984 Indoor | Michael Cannon | 4 × 400 meters relay | 3rd | |
| Men's | 1984 Outdoor | James Maness | 4 × 400 meters relay | 6th | |
| Men's | 1984 Outdoor | Keith Burnett | 4 × 400 meters relay | 6th | |
| Men's | 1984 Outdoor | Michael Cannon | 4 × 400 meters relay | 6th | |
| Men's | 1984 Outdoor | Allen Ingraham | 4 × 400 meters relay | 6th | |
| Men's | 1985 Indoor | Roscoe Tatum | 55 meters | 3rd | |
| Men's | 1985 Indoor | Raymond Stewart | 55 meters | 4th | |
| Women's | 1985 Indoor | Donna Thomas | Long jump | 2nd | |
| Women's | 1985 Indoor | Donna Thomas | Triple jump | 3rd | |
| Men's | 1985 Outdoor | Michael Cannon | 400 meters | 6th | |
| Men's | 1985 Outdoor | Johnny Walker | 800 meters | 6th | |
| Women's | 1985 Outdoor | Ella Smith | 200 meters | 5th | |
| Women's | 1985 Outdoor | Donna Thomas | Long jump | 8th | |
| Women's | 1985 Outdoor | Donna Thomas | Triple jump | 7th | |
| Men's | 1986 Indoor | Tony Allen | 4 × 400 meters relay | 5th | |
| Men's | 1986 Indoor | Steve Crumpton | 4 × 400 meters relay | 5th | |
| Men's | 1986 Indoor | Keith Burnett | 4 × 400 meters relay | 5th | |
| Men's | 1986 Indoor | Michael Cannon | 4 × 400 meters relay | 5th | |
| Men's | 1986 Outdoor | Michael Cannon | 400 meters | 4th | |
| Men's | 1986 Outdoor | Roscoe Tatum | 4 × 100 meters relay | 1st | |
| Men's | 1986 Outdoor | Andrew Smith | 4 × 100 meters relay | 1st | |
| Men's | 1986 Outdoor | Leroy Reid | 4 × 100 meters relay | 1st | |
| Men's | 1986 Outdoor | Greg Sholars | 4 × 100 meters relay | 1st | |
| Women's | 1986 Outdoor | Rebecca Allison | 1500 meters | 4th | |
| Men's | 1987 Indoor | Roscoe Tatum | 55 meters | 3rd | |
| Men's | 1987 Outdoor | Raymond Stewart | 100 meters | 1st | |
| Men's | 1987 Outdoor | Greg Sholars | 100 meters | 6th | |
| Men's | 1987 Outdoor | Raymond Stewart | 200 meters | 5th | |
| Men's | 1987 Outdoor | Roscoe Tatum | 4 × 100 meters relay | 1st | |
| Men's | 1987 Outdoor | Andrew Smith | 4 × 100 meters relay | 1st | |
| Men's | 1987 Outdoor | Greg Sholars | 4 × 100 meters relay | 1st | |
| Men's | 1987 Outdoor | Raymond Stewart | 4 × 100 meters relay | 1st | |
| Women's | 1987 Outdoor | Rebecca Allison | 1500 meters | 4th | |
| Men's | 1988 Indoor | Tony Allen | 400 meters | 5th | |
| Women's | 1988 Indoor | Lisa Ford | 200 meters | 7th | |
| Men's | 1988 Outdoor | Raymond Stewart | 100 meters | 2nd | |
| Men's | 1988 Outdoor | Roscoe Tatum | 100 meters | 7th | |
| Men's | 1988 Outdoor | Raymond Stewart | 200 meters | 5th | |
| Men's | 1988 Outdoor | Roscoe Tatum | 4 × 100 meters relay | 3rd | |
| Men's | 1988 Outdoor | Tony Allen | 4 × 100 meters relay | 3rd | |
| Men's | 1988 Outdoor | Raymond Stewart | 4 × 100 meters relay | 3rd | |
| Men's | 1988 Outdoor | Greg Sholars | 4 × 100 meters relay | 3rd | |
| Men's | 1989 Indoor | Raymond Stewart | 55 meters | 1st | |
| Men's | 1989 Outdoor | Raymond Stewart | 100 meters | 1st | |
| Men's | 1989 Outdoor | Greg Sholars | 100 meters | 8th | |
| Men's | 1989 Outdoor | William Maru | 800 meters | 6th | |
| Men's | 1989 Outdoor | Horatio Porter | 4 × 100 meters relay | 1st | |
| Men's | 1989 Outdoor | Andrew Smith | 4 × 100 meters relay | 1st | |
| Men's | 1989 Outdoor | Greg Sholars | 4 × 100 meters relay | 1st | |
| Men's | 1989 Outdoor | Raymond Stewart | 4 × 100 meters relay | 1st | |
| Men's | 1990 Indoor | William Maru | 800 meters | 6th | |
| Men's | 1990 Outdoor | William Maru | 800 meters | 5th | |
| Men's | 1990 Outdoor | Derek Thomas | 4 × 100 meters relay | 5th | |
| Men's | 1990 Outdoor | Raymond Redmon | 4 × 100 meters relay | 5th | |
| Men's | 1990 Outdoor | Ralston Wright | 4 × 100 meters relay | 5th | |
| Men's | 1990 Outdoor | Horatio Porter | 4 × 100 meters relay | 5th | |
| Men's | 1990 Outdoor | Jordy Reynolds | Shot put | 4th | |
| Men's | 1991 Indoor | Jon Drummond | 55 meters | 4th | |
| Men's | 1991 Indoor | Jordy Reynolds | Shot put | 4th | |
| Men's | 1991 Outdoor | Jon Drummond | 100 meters | 2nd | |
| Men's | 1991 Outdoor | Horatio Porter | 200 meters | 7th | |
| Men's | 1991 Outdoor | Jon Drummond | 4 × 100 meters relay | 1st | |
| Men's | 1991 Outdoor | Carey Johnson | 4 × 100 meters relay | 1st | |
| Men's | 1991 Outdoor | Ralston Wright | 4 × 100 meters relay | 1st | |
| Men's | 1991 Outdoor | Horatio Porter | 4 × 100 meters relay | 1st | |
| Men's | 1991 Outdoor | Jordy Reynolds | Shot put | 7th | |
| Men's | 1992 Outdoor | Horatio Porter | 200 meters | 7th | |
| Men's | 1992 Outdoor | Raymond Redmon | 4 × 100 meters relay | 4th | |
| Men's | 1992 Outdoor | Dennis Mowatt | 4 × 100 meters relay | 4th | |
| Men's | 1992 Outdoor | Ralston Wright | 4 × 100 meters relay | 4th | |
| Men's | 1992 Outdoor | Horatio Porter | 4 × 100 meters relay | 4th | |
| Men's | 1992 Outdoor | Jordy Reynolds | Shot put | 3rd | |
| Women's | 1993 Indoor | Stevanie Wadsworth-Ferguson | Shot put | 5th | |
| Men's | 1993 Outdoor | Jimmy Oliver | 4 × 100 meters relay | 2nd | |
| Men's | 1993 Outdoor | Dennis Mowatt | 4 × 100 meters relay | 2nd | |
| Men's | 1993 Outdoor | Brashant Carter | 4 × 100 meters relay | 2nd | |
| Men's | 1993 Outdoor | Hosia Abdallah | 4 × 100 meters relay | 2nd | |
| Women's | 1993 Outdoor | Beverly McDonald | 100 meters | 2nd | |
| Women's | 1993 Outdoor | Beverly McDonald | 200 meters | 2nd | |
| Women's | 1993 Outdoor | Stevanie Wadsworth-Ferguson | Shot put | 2nd | |
| Women's | 1994 Indoor | Stevanie Wadsworth-Ferguson | Shot put | 3rd | |
| Men's | 1994 Outdoor | Donovan Powell | 100 meters | 3rd | |
| Women's | 1994 Outdoor | Stevanie Wadsworth-Ferguson | Shot put | 3rd | |
| Men's | 1995 Indoor | Donovan Powell | 55 meters | 2nd | |
| Men's | 1995 Outdoor | Donovan Powell | 100 meters | 2nd | |
| Men's | 1995 Outdoor | Brashant Carter | 200 meters | 8th | |
| Men's | 1995 Outdoor | Donovan Powell | 4 × 100 meters relay | 1st | |
| Men's | 1995 Outdoor | Brashant Carter | 4 × 100 meters relay | 1st | |
| Men's | 1995 Outdoor | Lloyd Edwards | 4 × 100 meters relay | 1st | |
| Men's | 1995 Outdoor | Hosia Abdallah | 4 × 100 meters relay | 1st | |
| Women's | 1995 Outdoor | Stevanie Wadsworth-Ferguson | Shot put | 4th | |
| Men's | 1996 Indoor | Brashant Carter | 200 meters | 4th | |
| Men's | 1996 Outdoor | Brashant Carter | 200 meters | 8th | |
| Men's | 1996 Outdoor | George Hackney | 4 × 100 meters relay | 4th | |
| Men's | 1996 Outdoor | Brashant Carter | 4 × 100 meters relay | 4th | |
| Men's | 1996 Outdoor | Hosia Abdallah | 4 × 100 meters relay | 4th | |
| Men's | 1996 Outdoor | Chris Allison | 4 × 100 meters relay | 4th | |
| Men's | 1997 Indoor | Percival Spencer | 55 meters | 2nd | |
| Men's | 1997 Outdoor | Percival Spencer | 200 meters | 2nd | |
| Men's | 1997 Outdoor | Khadevis Robinson | 800 meters | 7th | |
| Men's | 1998 Indoor | Jarmiene Holloway | 55 meters | 7th | |
| Men's | 1998 Indoor | Khadevis Robinson | 800 meters | 4th | |
| Men's | 1998 Outdoor | Jarmiene Holloway | 100 meters | 2nd | |
| Men's | 1998 Outdoor | Percival Spencer | 100 meters | 4th | |
| Men's | 1998 Outdoor | Syan Williams | 200 meters | 7th | |
| Men's | 1998 Outdoor | Khadevis Robinson | 800 meters | 1st | |
| Men's | 1998 Outdoor | Khadevis Robinson | 800 meters | 1st | |
| Men's | 1998 Outdoor | Bryan Howard | 4 × 100 meters relay | 1st | |
| Men's | 1998 Outdoor | Jarmiene Holloway | 4 × 100 meters relay | 1st | |
| Men's | 1998 Outdoor | Syan Williams | 4 × 100 meters relay | 1st | |
| Men's | 1998 Outdoor | Percival Spencer | 4 × 100 meters relay | 1st | |
| Men's | 1998 Outdoor | Roy Williams | 4 × 400 meters relay | 2nd | |
| Men's | 1998 Outdoor | Clayton Brookins | 4 × 400 meters relay | 2nd | |
| Men's | 1998 Outdoor | Johnny Collins | 4 × 400 meters relay | 2nd | |
| Men's | 1998 Outdoor | Khadevis Robinson | 4 × 400 meters relay | 2nd | |
| Women's | 1998 Outdoor | Giesla Jackson | 4 × 100 meters relay | 3rd | |
| Women's | 1998 Outdoor | Dyweana Crudup | 4 × 100 meters relay | 3rd | |
| Women's | 1998 Outdoor | Catoshia Lewis | 4 × 100 meters relay | 3rd | |
| Women's | 1998 Outdoor | Tinesha Hackney | 4 × 100 meters relay | 3rd | |
| Men's | 1999 Indoor | Ricardo Williams | 200 meters | 8th | |
| Men's | 1999 Indoor | Jason Howard | High jump | 4th | |
| Men's | 2000 Indoor | Kim Collins | 60 meters | 2nd | |
| Men's | 2000 Indoor | Lindel Frater | 60 meters | 3rd | |
| Men's | 2000 Indoor | Kim Collins | 200 meters | 3rd | |
| Men's | 2000 Indoor | Darvis Patton | 200 meters | 7th | |
| Men's | 2000 Indoor | Johnny Collins | 400 meters | 7th | |
| Men's | 2000 Indoor | Roy Williams | 4 × 400 meters relay | 1st | |
| Men's | 2000 Indoor | Anthony Amantine | 4 × 400 meters relay | 1st | |
| Men's | 2000 Indoor | Kendrick Campbell | 4 × 400 meters relay | 1st | |
| Men's | 2000 Indoor | Johnny Collins | 4 × 400 meters relay | 1st | |
| Men's | 2000 Outdoor | Lindel Frater | 100 meters | 4th | |
| Men's | 2000 Outdoor | Darvis Patton | 200 meters | 4th | |
| Men's | 2000 Outdoor | Ricardo Williams | 200 meters | 5th | |
| Men's | 2000 Outdoor | Roy Williams | 4 × 400 meters relay | 4th | |
| Men's | 2000 Outdoor | Anthony Amantine | 4 × 400 meters relay | 4th | |
| Men's | 2000 Outdoor | Kendrick Campbell | 4 × 400 meters relay | 4th | |
| Men's | 2000 Outdoor | Johnny Collins | 4 × 400 meters relay | 4th | |
| Men's | 2000 Outdoor | Darvis Patton | Long jump | 8th | |
| Men's | 2001 Indoor | Kim Collins | 60 meters | 1st | |
| Men's | 2001 Indoor | Lindel Frater | 60 meters | 5th | |
| Men's | 2001 Indoor | Darvis Patton | 60 meters | 7th | |
| Men's | 2001 Indoor | Kim Collins | 200 meters | 1st | |
| Men's | 2001 Indoor | Darvis Patton | 200 meters | 5th | |
| Men's | 2001 Indoor | Eliud Njubi | Mile run | 8th | |
| Men's | 2001 Indoor | Darvis Patton | Long jump | 7th | |
| Women's | 2001 Indoor | Monica Twum | 60 meters | 6th | |
| Men's | 2001 Outdoor | Kim Collins | 100 meters | 2nd | |
| Men's | 2001 Outdoor | Lindel Frater | 100 meters | 5th | |
| Men's | 2001 Outdoor | Darvis Patton | 100 meters | 6th | |
| Men's | 2001 Outdoor | Darvis Patton | 200 meters | 3rd | |
| Men's | 2001 Outdoor | Eliud Njubi | 800 meters | 8th | |
| Men's | 2001 Outdoor | Eliud Njubi | 1500 meters | 7th | |
| Men's | 2001 Outdoor | Lindel Frater | 4 × 100 meters relay | 1st | |
| Men's | 2001 Outdoor | David Spencer | 4 × 100 meters relay | 1st | |
| Men's | 2001 Outdoor | Darvis Patton | 4 × 100 meters relay | 1st | |
| Men's | 2001 Outdoor | Kim Collins | 4 × 100 meters relay | 1st | |
| Men's | 2001 Outdoor | Darvis Patton | Long jump | 4th | |
| Men's | 2001 Outdoor | Jason Howard | Triple jump | 3rd | |
| Men's | 2001 Outdoor | Abdul Rasheed | Triple jump | 5th | |
| Men's | 2002 Indoor | Cleavon Dillon | Long jump | 4th | |
| Men's | 2002 Outdoor | Michael Frater | 100 meters | 4th | |
| Men's | 2002 Outdoor | Aundre Edwards | Long jump | 5th | |
| Women's | 2002 Outdoor | Latoya White | 4 × 100 meters relay | 8th | |
| Women's | 2002 Outdoor | Chaunte Baldwin | 4 × 100 meters relay | 8th | |
| Women's | 2002 Outdoor | Tiffany Starts | 4 × 100 meters relay | 8th | |
| Women's | 2002 Outdoor | Monica Twum | 4 × 100 meters relay | 8th | |
| Men's | 2003 Indoor | Michael Frater | 60 meters | 4th | |
| Men's | 2003 Indoor | Jackson Langat | 800 meters | 6th | |
| Men's | 2003 Indoor | Brandon Simpson | 4 × 400 meters relay | 2nd | |
| Men's | 2003 Indoor | Jackson Langat | 4 × 400 meters relay | 2nd | |
| Men's | 2003 Indoor | Jabari Fields | 4 × 400 meters relay | 2nd | |
| Men's | 2003 Indoor | Jerry Harris | 4 × 400 meters relay | 2nd | |
| Men's | 2003 Outdoor | Michael Frater | 100 meters | 3rd | |
| Men's | 2003 Outdoor | Brandon Simpson | 400 meters | 7th | |
| Men's | 2003 Outdoor | Jackson Langat | 800 meters | 6th | |
| Men's | 2003 Outdoor | Tyrone Sanders | 4 × 100 meters relay | 6th | |
| Men's | 2003 Outdoor | Cleavon Dillon | 4 × 100 meters relay | 6th | |
| Men's | 2003 Outdoor | Jerry Harris | 4 × 100 meters relay | 6th | |
| Men's | 2003 Outdoor | Michael Frater | 4 × 100 meters relay | 6th | |
| Men's | 2003 Outdoor | Aundre Edwards | Long jump | 4th | |
| Women's | 2003 Outdoor | Latoya White | 4 × 100 meters relay | 6th | |
| Women's | 2003 Outdoor | Donita Harmon | 4 × 100 meters relay | 6th | |
| Women's | 2003 Outdoor | Kandis Bell | 4 × 100 meters relay | 6th | |
| Women's | 2003 Outdoor | Monica Twum | 4 × 100 meters relay | 6th | |
| Men's | 2004 Indoor | Jabari Fields | 60 meters | 5th | |
| Men's | 2004 Indoor | Jerry Harris | 400 meters | 2nd | |
| Men's | 2004 Indoor | Jackson Langat | 800 meters | 4th | |
| Men's | 2004 Indoor | Brett Wilson | 4 × 400 meters relay | 8th | |
| Men's | 2004 Indoor | Dwayne Lynes-Bell | 4 × 400 meters relay | 8th | |
| Men's | 2004 Indoor | Che Chavez | 4 × 400 meters relay | 8th | |
| Men's | 2004 Indoor | Jerry Harris | 4 × 400 meters relay | 8th | |
| Men's | 2004 Indoor | Aundre Edwards | Long jump | 3rd | |
| Men's | 2004 Outdoor | Michael Frater | 100 meters | 2nd | |
| Men's | 2004 Outdoor | Jabari Fields | 200 meters | 3rd | |
| Men's | 2004 Outdoor | Jerry Harris | 400 meters | 3rd | |
| Men's | 2004 Outdoor | Jabari Fields | 4 × 100 meters relay | 4th | |
| Men's | 2004 Outdoor | Cleavon Dillon | 4 × 100 meters relay | 4th | |
| Men's | 2004 Outdoor | Jerry Harris | 4 × 100 meters relay | 4th | |
| Men's | 2004 Outdoor | Michael Frater | 4 × 100 meters relay | 4th | |
| Men's | 2004 Outdoor | Aundre Edwards | Long jump | 4th | |
| Women's | 2004 Outdoor | Jamee Jones | 4 × 100 meters relay | 7th | |
| Women's | 2004 Outdoor | Donita Harmon | 4 × 100 meters relay | 7th | |
| Women's | 2004 Outdoor | Larissa Bakasa | 4 × 100 meters relay | 7th | |
| Women's | 2004 Outdoor | Virgil Hodge | 4 × 100 meters relay | 7th | |
| Women's | 2005 Outdoor | Marquita Davis | 4 × 400 meters relay | 8th | |
| Women's | 2005 Outdoor | Deborah Jones | 4 × 400 meters relay | 8th | |
| Women's | 2005 Outdoor | Donita Harmon | 4 × 400 meters relay | 8th | |
| Women's | 2005 Outdoor | Nathandra John | 4 × 400 meters relay | 8th | |
| Men's | 2006 Indoor | Lewis Banda | 400 meters | 3rd | |
| Men's | 2006 Indoor | Jackson Langat | 800 meters | 1st | |
| Men's | 2006 Indoor | Lewis Banda | 4 × 400 meters relay | 8th | |
| Men's | 2006 Indoor | Quincy Butler | 4 × 400 meters relay | 8th | |
| Men's | 2006 Indoor | Otis McDaniel | 4 × 400 meters relay | 8th | |
| Men's | 2006 Indoor | Jackson Langat | 4 × 400 meters relay | 8th | |
| Men's | 2006 Outdoor | Lewis Banda | 400 meters | 4th | |
| Men's | 2006 Outdoor | Bradley Reed | 4 × 100 meters relay | 4th | |
| Men's | 2006 Outdoor | Otis McDaniel | 4 × 100 meters relay | 4th | |
| Men's | 2006 Outdoor | Justyn Warner | 4 × 100 meters relay | 4th | |
| Men's | 2006 Outdoor | Lewis Banda | 4 × 100 meters relay | 4th | |
| Men's | 2006 Outdoor | Che Chavez | 4 × 400 meters relay | 2nd | |
| Men's | 2006 Outdoor | Delwayne Delaney | 4 × 400 meters relay | 2nd | |
| Men's | 2006 Outdoor | Jackson Langat | 4 × 400 meters relay | 2nd | |
| Men's | 2006 Outdoor | Lewis Banda | 4 × 400 meters relay | 2nd | |
| Women's | 2006 Outdoor | Virgil Hodge | 200 meters | 7th | |
| Women's | 2006 Outdoor | Deborah Jones | 4 × 400 meters relay | 7th | |
| Women's | 2006 Outdoor | Marquita Davis | 4 × 400 meters relay | 7th | |
| Women's | 2006 Outdoor | Kishelle Paul | 4 × 400 meters relay | 7th | |
| Women's | 2006 Outdoor | Nathandra John | 4 × 400 meters relay | 7th | |
| Women's | 2007 Indoor | Virgil Hodge | 200 meters | 7th | |
| Women's | 2007 Indoor | Deborah Jones | 4 × 400 meters relay | 6th | |
| Women's | 2007 Indoor | Kishelle Paul | 4 × 400 meters relay | 6th | |
| Women's | 2007 Indoor | Jamee Jones | 4 × 400 meters relay | 6th | |
| Women's | 2007 Indoor | Nathandra John | 4 × 400 meters relay | 6th | |
| Men's | 2007 Outdoor | Jonathan Jackson | Triple jump | 3rd | |
| Women's | 2007 Outdoor | Virgil Hodge | 200 meters | 5th | |
| Women's | 2007 Outdoor | Kandis Bell | 4 × 100 meters relay | 4th | |
| Women's | 2007 Outdoor | Jamee Jones | 4 × 100 meters relay | 4th | |
| Women's | 2007 Outdoor | Deborah Jones | 4 × 100 meters relay | 4th | |
| Women's | 2007 Outdoor | Virgil Hodge | 4 × 100 meters relay | 4th | |
| Men's | 2008 Indoor | Che Chavez | 4 × 400 meters relay | 2nd | |
| Men's | 2008 Indoor | Dell Guy | 4 × 400 meters relay | 2nd | |
| Men's | 2008 Indoor | Clemore Henry | 4 × 400 meters relay | 2nd | |
| Men's | 2008 Indoor | Matt Love | 4 × 400 meters relay | 2nd | |
| Men's | 2008 Indoor | Jonathan Jackson | Triple jump | 3rd | |
| Women's | 2008 Indoor | Virgil Hodge | 200 meters | 7th | |
| Men's | 2008 Outdoor | Justyn Warner | 4 × 100 meters relay | 7th | |
| Men's | 2008 Outdoor | Mychal Dungey | 4 × 100 meters relay | 7th | |
| Men's | 2008 Outdoor | Andon Mitchell | 4 × 100 meters relay | 7th | |
| Men's | 2008 Outdoor | Otis McDaniel | 4 × 100 meters relay | 7th | |
| Women's | 2009 Indoor | Jessica Young | 60 meters | 4th | |
| Women's | 2009 Indoor | Hayley Shade | 4 × 400 meters relay | 4th | |
| Women's | 2009 Indoor | Kishelle Paul | 4 × 400 meters relay | 4th | |
| Women's | 2009 Indoor | Jessica Clarke | 4 × 400 meters relay | 4th | |
| Women's | 2009 Indoor | Jessica Young | 4 × 400 meters relay | 4th | |
| Men's | 2009 Outdoor | Mark Barnes | 4 × 100 meters relay | 8th | |
| Men's | 2009 Outdoor | Otis McDaniel | 4 × 100 meters relay | 8th | |
| Men's | 2009 Outdoor | Mychal Dungey | 4 × 100 meters relay | 8th | |
| Men's | 2009 Outdoor | Justyn Warner | 4 × 100 meters relay | 8th | |
| Women's | 2009 Outdoor | Jessica Young | 100 meters | 2nd | |
| Women's | 2009 Outdoor | Neidra Covington | Triple jump | 8th | |
| Men's | 2010 Indoor | Festus Kigen | 5000 meters | 6th | |
| Women's | 2010 Indoor | Kristal Juarez | 400 meters | 7th | |
| Women's | 2010 Indoor | Whitney Gipson | Long jump | 6th | |
| Women's | 2010 Indoor | Neidra Covington | Triple jump | 6th | |
| Women's | 2010 Outdoor | Neidra Covington | Long jump | 7th | |
| Women's | 2010 Outdoor | Neidra Covington | Triple jump | 7th | |
| Women's | 2011 Indoor | Jessica Young | 60 meters | 2nd | |
| Women's | 2011 Indoor | Quinterra Charles | 4 × 400 meters relay | 5th | |
| Women's | 2011 Indoor | Kristal Juarez | 4 × 400 meters relay | 5th | |
| Women's | 2011 Indoor | Teneshia Peart | 4 × 400 meters relay | 5th | |
| Women's | 2011 Indoor | Jessica Young | 4 × 400 meters relay | 5th | |
| Women's | 2011 Indoor | Whitney Gipson | Long jump | 6th | |
| Women's | 2011 Outdoor | Jessica Young | 100 meters | 3rd | |
| Women's | 2011 Outdoor | Whitney Gipson | Long jump | 4th | |
| Women's | 2012 Indoor | Whitney Gipson | Long jump | 1st | |
| Men's | 2012 Outdoor | Charles Silmon | 100 meters | 7th | |
| Women's | 2012 Outdoor | Whitney Gipson | Long jump | 1st | |
| Men's | 2013 Indoor | Charles Silmon | 60 meters | 3rd | |
| Women's | 2013 Indoor | Lorraine Ugen | Long jump | 5th | |
| Men's | 2013 Outdoor | Charles Silmon | 100 meters | 1st | |
| Men's | 2013 Outdoor | Harvey McSwain | 4 × 100 meters relay | 7th | |
| Men's | 2013 Outdoor | Narada Jackson | 4 × 100 meters relay | 7th | |
| Men's | 2013 Outdoor | Ronnie Baker | 4 × 100 meters relay | 7th | |
| Men's | 2013 Outdoor | Raymond Bozmans | 4 × 100 meters relay | 7th | |
| Men's | 2013 Outdoor | Joshua Washington | 4 × 400 meters relay | 7th | |
| Men's | 2013 Outdoor | Narada Jackson | 4 × 400 meters relay | 7th | |
| Men's | 2013 Outdoor | Lavon Collins | 4 × 400 meters relay | 7th | |
| Men's | 2013 Outdoor | Ronnie Baker | 4 × 400 meters relay | 7th | |
| Men's | 2013 Outdoor | Cameron Parker | Triple jump | 5th | |
| Women's | 2013 Outdoor | Lorraine Ugen | Long jump | 1st | |
| Women's | 2014 Indoor | Lorraine Ugen | Long jump | 1st | |
| Women's | 2014 Outdoor | Lorraine Ugen | Long jump | 4th | |
| Men's | 2015 Indoor | Ronnie Baker | 60 meters | 1st | |
| Men's | 2015 Indoor | Sam Watts | 200 meters | 8th | |
| Men's | 2015 Indoor | Kevin McClanahan | 4 × 400 meters relay | 5th | |
| Men's | 2015 Indoor | Raymond Bozmans | 4 × 400 meters relay | 5th | |
| Men's | 2015 Indoor | Kolby Listenbee | 4 × 400 meters relay | 5th | |
| Men's | 2015 Indoor | Ronnie Baker | 4 × 400 meters relay | 5th | |
| Men's | 2015 Indoor | Cameron Echols-Luper | Long jump | 5th | |
| Men's | 2015 Outdoor | Kolby Listenbee | 100 meters | 7th | |
| Men's | 2015 Outdoor | Cameron Echols-Luper | 4 × 100 meters relay | 2nd | |
| Men's | 2015 Outdoor | Sam Watts | 4 × 100 meters relay | 2nd | |
| Men's | 2015 Outdoor | Ronnie Baker | 4 × 100 meters relay | 2nd | |
| Men's | 2015 Outdoor | Kolby Listenbee | 4 × 100 meters relay | 2nd | |
| Men's | 2016 Indoor | Ronnie Baker | 60 meters | 1st | |
| Men's | 2016 Indoor | Sam Watts | 200 meters | 7th | |
| Men's | 2016 Outdoor | Raymond Bozmans | 4 × 100 meters relay | 6th | |
| Men's | 2016 Outdoor | Sam Watts | 4 × 100 meters relay | 6th | |
| Men's | 2016 Outdoor | Darrion Flowers | 4 × 100 meters relay | 6th | |
| Men's | 2016 Outdoor | Ronnie Baker | 4 × 100 meters relay | 6th | |
| Men's | 2018 Indoor | Derrick Mokaleng | 400 meters | 7th | |
| Men's | 2018 Indoor | Emmanuel Ogwo | 4 × 400 meters relay | 7th | |
| Men's | 2018 Indoor | Jostyn Andrews | 4 × 400 meters relay | 7th | |
| Men's | 2018 Indoor | Kevin McClanahan | 4 × 400 meters relay | 7th | |
| Men's | 2018 Indoor | Derrick Mokaleng | 4 × 400 meters relay | 7th | |
| Men's | 2018 Indoor | Du Mapaya | Triple jump | 3rd | |
| Men's | 2018 Indoor | Scotty Newton | Triple jump | 7th | |
| Men's | 2018 Outdoor | Scotty Newton | Triple jump | 4th | |
| Men's | 2018 Outdoor | Du Mapaya | Triple jump | 5th | |
| Men's | 2019 Indoor | Derrick Mokaleng | 400 meters | 8th | |
| Men's | 2019 Indoor | Darrion Flowers | 4 × 400 meters relay | 7th | |
| Men's | 2019 Indoor | Tinotenda Matiyenga | 4 × 400 meters relay | 7th | |
| Men's | 2019 Indoor | Emmanuel Ogwo | 4 × 400 meters relay | 7th | |
| Men's | 2019 Indoor | Derrick Mokaleng | 4 × 400 meters relay | 7th | |
| Men's | 2019 Indoor | Du Mapaya | Triple jump | 3rd | |
| Women's | 2019 Indoor | Destiny Longmire | Long jump | 4th | |
| Men's | 2019 Outdoor | Du Mapaya | Triple jump | 1st | |
| Women's | 2019 Outdoor | Destiny Longmire | Long jump | 4th | |
| Men's | 2021 Indoor | Du Mapaya | Triple jump | 2nd | |
| Men's | 2021 Outdoor | Robert Gregory | 200 meters | 8th | |
| Men's | 2021 Outdoor | Du Mapaya | Triple jump | 3rd | |
| Men's | 2022 Indoor | Robert Gregory | 200 meters | 2nd | |
| Men's | 2022 Indoor | Tinotenda Matiyenga | 200 meters | 3rd | |
| Men's | 2022 Indoor | Du Mapaya | Triple jump | 3rd | |
| Men's | 2022 Outdoor | Robert Gregory | 200 meters | 7th | |
| Men's | 2022 Outdoor | Bryson Stubblefield | 4 × 100 meters relay | 7th | |
| Men's | 2022 Outdoor | Tinotenda Matiyenga | 4 × 100 meters relay | 7th | |
| Men's | 2022 Outdoor | Kundai Maguranyanga | 4 × 100 meters relay | 7th | |
| Men's | 2022 Outdoor | Robert Gregory | 4 × 100 meters relay | 7th | |
| Men's | 2022 Outdoor | Du Mapaya | Triple jump | 1st | |
| Women's | 2024 Outdoor | Irene Jepkemboi | Javelin throw | 4th | |
| Women's | 2025 Indoor | Indya Mayberry | 60 meters | 4th | |
| Women's | 2025 Indoor | Indya Mayberry | 200 meters | 1st | |
| Men's | 2025 Outdoor | Jayden Douglas | 400 meters | 8th | |
| Women's | 2025 Outdoor | Amari Kiluvia | 100 meters | 7th | |
| Women's | 2025 Outdoor | Amelliah Birdow | 400 meters | 2nd | |
| Women's | 2025 Outdoor | Amelliah Birdow | 400 meters | 7th | |
| Women's | 2025 Outdoor | Amelliah Birdow | 400 meters hurdles | 7th | |
| Women's | 2025 Outdoor | Teanna Harlin | 4 × 100 meters relay | 4th | |
| Women's | 2025 Outdoor | Iyana Gray | 4 × 100 meters relay | 4th | |
| Women's | 2025 Outdoor | London Tucker | 4 × 100 meters relay | 4th | |
| Women's | 2025 Outdoor | Indya Mayberry | 4 × 100 meters relay | 4th | |
| Women's | 2025 Outdoor | Irene Jepkemboi | Javelin throw | 3rd | |

== See also ==
- Category:TCU Horned Frogs men's track and field athletes (35)
- Category:TCU Horned Frogs women's track and field athletes (6)
