= 200 meters at the NCAA Division I Indoor Track and Field Championships =

This is a list of the NCAA indoor champions in the 200 meters. The event was first held in 1988.

== Winners ==
Key
y=yards
w=wind aided
A=Altitude assisted

Women's 200m winners
Year	Athlete	Team	Time
1988	Pauline Davis	Alabama Crimson Tide	22.99
1989	Dawn Sowell	LSU Lady Tigers	22.96
1990	Carlette Guidry	Texas Longhorns	23.28
1991	Carlette Guidry	Texas Longhorns	23.23
1992	Michelle Collins	Houston Cougars	23.22
1993	Holli Hyche	Indiana State Sycamores	22.98
1994	Holli Hyche	Indiana State Sycamores	22.90
1995	Merlene Frazer	Texas Longhorns	23.14
1996	Debbie Ferguson	Georgia Bulldogs	23.17
1997	Nanceen Perry	Texas Longhorns	23.09
1998	LaKeisha Backus	Texas Longhorns	23.18
1999	Peta-Gaye Dowdie	LSU Lady Tigers	22.83
2000	Miki Barber	South Carolina Gamecocks	23.06
2001	Cydonie Mothersille	Clemson Tigers	22.89
2002	Muna Lee	LSU Lady Tigers	22.82
2003	Muna Lee	LSU Lady Tigers	22.61
2004	Veronica Campbell	Arkansas Razorbacks	22.43
2005	Tremedia Brice	Texas Southern Tigers	22.90
2006	Shalonda Solomon	South Carolina Gamecocks	22.57
2007	Kerron Stewart	Auburn Tigers	22.58
2008	Bianca Knight	Texas Longhorns	22.40
2009	Murielle Ahouré	Miami Hurricanes	22.80
2010	Sheniqua Ferguson	Auburn Tigers	23.09
2011	Kimberlyn Duncan	LSU Lady Tigers	22.85
2012	Kimberlyn Duncan	LSU Lady Tigers	22.74
2013	Kimberlyn Duncan	LSU Lady Tigers	22.58
2014	Dezerea Bryant	Kentucky Wildcats	22.69 A
2015	Kyra Jefferson	Florida Gators	22.63
2016	Felicia Brown	Tennessee Volunteers	22.47
2017	Ariana Washington	Oregon Ducks	22.42
2018	Gabrielle Thomas	Harvard Crimson	22.38
2019	Kayla White	North Carolina A&T Aggies	22.66
2021	Abby Steiner	Kentucky Wildcats	22.38
2022	Abby Steiner	Kentucky Wildcats	22.16
2023	Julien Alfred	Texas Longhorns	22.01 A
2024	JaMeesia Ford	South Carolina Gamecocks	22.34
2025	India Mayberry	TCU Horned Frogs	22.30
2026	Adaejah Hodge (BVI)	Georgia Bulldogs	22.22

Men's 200m winners
Year	Athlete	Team	Time
1988	Dennis Mitchell	Florida Gators	20.73
1989	Michael Johnson	Baylor Bears	20.59
1990	Michael Johnson	Baylor Bears	20.72
1991	Frankie Fredericks Namibia	BYU Cougars	20.68
1992	James Trapp	Clemson Tigers	20.66
1993	Chris Nelloms	Ohio State Buckeyes	20.93
1994	Chris Nelloms	Ohio State Buckeyes	20.60
1995	Dave Dopek	DePaul Blue Demons	20.78
1996	Obadele Thompson Barbados	UTEP Miners	20.36
1997	Obadele Thompson Barbados	UTEP Miners	20.67
1998	Shawn Crawford	Clemson Tigers	20.69
1999	Coby Miller	Auburn Tigers	20.68
2000	Shawn Crawford	Clemson Tigers	20.26
2001	Kim Collins Saint Kitts and Nevis	TCU Horned Frogs	20.55
2002	Justin Gatlin	Tennessee Volunteers	20.63
2003	Leo Bookman	Kansas Jayhawks	20.53
2004	Leo Bookman	Kansas Jayhawks	20.42
2005	Wallace Spearmon	Arkansas Razorbacks	20.10
2006	Walter Dix	Florida State Seminoles	20.27
2007	Walter Dix	Florida State Seminoles	20.32
2008	Rubin Williams	Florida State Seminoles	20.36
2009	Trey Harts	Baylor Bears	20.63
2010	Curtis Mitchell	Texas A&M Aggies	20.38
2011	Mookie Salaam	Oklahoma Sooners	20.38
2012	Ameer Webb	Texas A&M Aggies	20.57
2013	Ameer Webb	Texas A&M Aggies	20.42
2014	Diondre Batson	Alabama Crimson Tide	20.32
2015	Trayvon Bromell	Baylor Bears	20.19
2016	Christian Coleman	Tennessee Volunteers	20.55
2017	Christian Coleman	Tennessee Volunteers	20.11
2018	Elijah Hall	Houston Cougars	20.02
2019	Divine Oduduru Nigeria	Texas Tech Red Raiders	20.49
2021	Matthew Boling	Georgia Bulldogs	20.19
2022	Javonte' Harding	North Carolina A&T Aggies	20.46
2023	Matthew Boling	Georgia Bulldogs	20.12
2024	Terrence Jones	Texas Tech Red Raiders	20.23
2025	Carli Makarawu (ZIM)	Kentucky Wildcats	20.13
2026	Garrett Kaalund	USC Trojans	19.95
