= Otis McDaniel =

American sprinter (born 1986)

Personal information
- Nationality: United States
- Born: June 30, 1986 (age 40) Sacramento, California, U.S.
- Height: 6 ft 0 in (1.83 m)
- Weight: 185 lb (84 kg)

Sport
- Sport: Running
- Events: 100 meters, 200 meters

Achievements and titles
- Personal bests: 100 m: 10.24 s (Nivelles 2010); 200 m: 20.35 s (Provo 2006)
Medal record
Men's athletics
Representing United States
Pan American Junior Championships
Gold medal – first place	2005 Windsor	200 m
Gold medal – first place	2005 Windsor	4×100 m relay
NACAC Under-23 Championships
Gold medal – first place	2006 Santo Domingo	200 m

Otis Gene McDaniel III (born June 30, 1986) is an American sprinter who specializes in the 100 and 200 meters.

He won two gold medals at the 2005 Pan American Junior Athletics Championships, in the 200 meters and 4×100 meters relay.

A native of San Antonio, Texas, he attended William Howard Taft High School, where he was an All-American wide receiver. He committed to Texas Christian University on a football scholarship.

McDaniel was an All-American sprinter for the TCU Horned Frogs track and field team, finishing 4th in the 4 × 100 meters relay at the 2006 NCAA Division I Outdoor Track and Field Championships. In the fall of 2008, McDaniel broke a bone in his foot by stepping on the rail of the track during practice.
