= Michael Cannon =

Michael Cannon may refer to:

- Michael F. Cannon, American health policy researcher
- Michael R. Cannon (born 1953), American businessman
- Michael Cannon (sprinter) (born 1964), American sprinter
- Michael Cannon (writer) (1929–2022), Australian writer and first editor for Michael Costigan at the Sunday Observer

== See also ==
- Mike Cannon-Brookes (born 1979), Australian billionaire, co-founder and co-CEO of the software company Atlassian
