= Tremaine Smith =

American sprinter (born 1986)

Personal information
- Nationality: United States
- Born: April 16, 1986 (age 40) Houston, Texas
- Height: 5 ft 10 in (1.78 m)

Sport
- Sport: Track and field
- Event(s): 100 meters, 200 meters
- College team: Houston Cougars

Achievements and titles
- Personal best(s): 100 m: 10.57 s (Houston 2005); 200 m: 20.86 s (Carson, CA)
Medal record
Men's athletics
Representing United States
Pan American Junior Championships
Gold medal – first place	2005 Windsor	4×100 m relay
Silver medal – second place	2005 Windsor	200 m

Tremaine Smith (born April 16, 1986) is an American sprinter who specializes in the 100 and 200 meters.

He won gold and silver medals at the 2005 Pan American Junior Athletics Championships, in the 200 meters and 4×100 meters relay.

Smith was an All-American sprinter for the Houston Cougars track and field team, placing 8th on their 4 × 100 meters relay at the 2006 NCAA Division I Outdoor Track and Field Championships.
