= 2005 Pan American Junior Athletics Championships =

XIII Pan American Junior Athletics Championships
- Dates: July 29–31
- Host city: Windsor, Canada
- Venue: University of Windsor Stadium
- Level: Junior
- Events: 44
- Participation: about 387 athletes from 35 nations

The 13th Pan American Junior Athletics Championships were held in Windsor, Ontario at the University of Windsor Stadium on July 29–31, 2005.

== Participation (unofficial) ==
Detailed result lists can be found on the Athletics Canada, the CACAC, the USA Track & Field, and the "World Junior Athletics History" website. An unofficial count yields the number of about 387 athletes from about 35 countries: Anguilla (1), Antigua and Barbuda (3), Argentina (5), Aruba (1), Bahamas (16), Barbados (6), Bermuda (5), Brazil (29), British Virgin Islands (3), Canada (73), Cayman Islands (4), Chile (6), Colombia (10), Costa Rica (5), Cuba (14), Dominican Republic (2), El Salvador (1), Grenada (2), Guatemala (5), Guyana (1), Haiti (2), Jamaica (43), Mexico (21), Nicaragua (2), Panama (1), Paraguay (2), Peru (6), Puerto Rico (18), Saint Kitts and Nevis (6), Saint Lucia (1), Saint Vincent and the Grenadines (2), Trinidad and Tobago (17), United States (80), Uruguay (1), Venezuela (3).

== Medal summary ==
Medal winners are published. Complete results can be found on the Athletics Canada, on the CACAC, on the USA Track & Field and on the "World Junior Athletics History" website.

=== Men ===
Event	Gold		Silver		Bronze	
100 metres (Wind: +0.7 m/s)	James Samuels (USA)	10.20 =CR	Justyn Warner (CAN)	10.26	Rafael Ribeiro (BRA)	10.33
200 metres (Wind: +2.5 m/s)	Otis McDaniel (USA)	20.67w	Tremaine Smith (USA)	20.78w	Daniel Bailey (ATG)	20.80w
400 metres	Justin Oliver (USA)	46.73	Nathaniel Anderson (USA)	46.91	Jason Edwards (JAM)	47.31
800 metres	Gilder Barboza (VEN)	1:50.76	Karjuan Williams (USA)	1:50.97	Jacob DuBois (USA)	1:51.01
1500 metres	Mike Woods (CAN)	3:45.72 CR	Braden Novakowski (CAN)	3:48.92	Mark Matusak (USA)	3:49.81
5000 metres	Daniel Nunn (USA)	14:55.17	Paul Hefferon (USA)	14:56.65	Joilson da Silva (BRA)	14:58.54
10,000 metres	Neal Naughton (USA)	30:12.14	Joshua Perrin (USA)	30:19.53	Joilson da Silva (BRA)	30:21.62
3000 metres steeplechase	José Alberto Sánchez (CUB)	8:43.96 CR	Alex Genest (CAN)	8:47.00	Chris Winter (CAN)	8:58.49
110 metres hurdles (Wind: −1.6 m/s)	Dayron Robles (CUB)	13.46 CR	Tyron Akins (USA)	14.00	Dominic Berger (USA)	14.01
400 metres hurdles	Reuben McCoy (USA)	50.28	Greg Offerman (USA)	51.84	Terry Marshall (BAR)	52.12
4 × 100 metres relay	United States; Wopamo Osaisai; Otis McDaniel; Tremaine Smith; James Samuels	39.36	Canada; Adam Newton; Oluseyi Smith; Gavin Smellie; Justyn Warner	40.25	Jamaica; Cawayne Jervis; Dwight Mullings; Rascive Grant; Omar Brown	40.27
4 × 400 metres relay	United States; Lionel Larry; Terrance Reid; Nate Anderson; Justin Oliver	3:05.34	Jamaica; Michael Gardener; Leford Green; Kerone Robinson; Jason Edwards	3:08.64	Canada; Gavin Smellie; Aaron White; Brian Cummings; Bryan Barnett	3:09.50
10,000 metres track walk	Marco Antonio Rodríguez (ESA)	44:49.62	Pierre-Luc Ménard (CAN)	45:09.50	Noel Santini (PUR)	45:32.16
High jump	Dustin Jonas (USA)	2.21	Darvin Edwards (LCA)	2.15	Guilherme Cobbo (BRA)	2.15
Pole vault	Germán Chiaraviglio (ARG)	5.40	Mitch Greeley (USA)	5.00	José Montaño (MEX)	5.00
Long jump	Robert Rands (USA)	7.60 (−1.1 m/s)	Jermaine Alphous Jackson (JAM)	7.59 (−1.7 m/s)	Oluseyi Smith (CAN)	7.27 (−0.4 m/s)
Triple jump	Denis Fernández (CUB)	16.80w (2.1 m/s)	Kenneth Hall (USA)	16.55 (1.6 m/s)	Maxwell Álvarez (GUA)	15.50 (1.9 m/s)
Shot put	Ryan Whiting (USA)	19.75	Nathan Englin (USA)	19.61	Kyle Helf (CAN)	18.21
Discus throw	Ryan Whiting (USA)	61.40 CR	Jorge Fernández (CUB)	57.87	Edward Cornell (USA)	55.04
Hammer throw	Boldizsár Kocsor (USA)	68.15	Roberto Janet (CUB)	66.76	John Freeman (USA)	64.58
Javelin throw	Júlio César de Oliveira (BRA)	72.35	Corey White (USA)	69.76	Víctor Fatecha (PAR)	67.00
Decathlon	Andrés Silva (URU)	7641 CR	Yunior Díaz (CUB)	7290	Michael Bingham (USA)	7049

=== Women ===
Event	Gold		Silver		Bronze	
100 metres (Wind: −1.8 m/s)	Cleo Tyson (USA)	11.52	Schillonie Calvert (JAM)	11.80	Darlenis Obregón (COL)	11.82
200 metres (Wind: +2.0 m/s)	Anneisha McLaughlin (JAM)	23.00	Alexandria Anderson (USA)	23.06	Brittany Jones (USA)	23.23
400 metres	Natasha Hastings (USA)	52.15	Carline Muir (CAN)	52.38	Sonita Sutherland (JAM)	52.68
800 metres	Rebekah Noble (USA)	2:04.07	Heidi Magill (USA)	2:04.12	Analia Videaux (CUB)	2:06.49
1500 metres	Sarah Bowman (USA)	4:17.61	Erin Bedell (USA)	4:22.87	Liudmila Florentín (CUB)	4:26.94
3000 metres	Alyson Kohlmeier (CAN)	9:25.09	Inés Melchor (PER)	9:36.24	Mandy McBean (CAN)	9:42.75
5000 metres	Inés Melchor (PER)	16:48.06	Nicole Blood (USA)	16:55.17	Whitney Anderson (USA)	17:04.22
3000 metres steeplechase	Sabine Heitling (BRA)	10:04.71	Marie Lawrence (USA)	10:27.44	Lindsay Allen (USA)	10:28.49
100 metres hurdles (Wind: +2.1 m/s)	Latoya Greaves (JAM)	13.38w	Natasha Ruddock (JAM)	13.42w	Geneviève Thibault (CAN)	13.50w
400 metres hurdles	Nickiesha Wilson (JAM)	57.40	Krystal Cantey (USA)	59.26	Corri-Ann Campbell-Fell (CAN)	60.64
4 × 100 metres relay	United States; Amberly Nesbitt; Alexandria Anderson; Kristina Davis; Cleo Tyson	43.97	Trinidad and Tobago; Cadajah Spencer; Sade St. Louis; Jurnelle Francis; Monique Cabral	45.45	Brazil; Tatiane Ferraz; Bárbara Leôncio; Vanda Gomes; Josiane Valentim	45.75
4 × 400 metres relay	United States; Nicole Leach; Deonna Lawrence; Brittany Jones; Natasha Hastings	3:32.82	Jamaica; Anastasia Le-Roy; Sonita Sutherland; Bobby-Gaye Wilkins; Sherene Pinnock	3:36.99	Canada; Bailey Lewis; Corri-Ann Campbell-Fell; Omoye Ugiagbe; Carline Muir	3:41.29
10,000 metres track walk	Jamy Franco (GUA)	49:36.25CR	Leisy Rodríguez (CUB)	49:41.68	Maria Michta (USA)	49:43.85
High jump	Rhonda Watkins (TRI)	1.79	Latroya Darrell (BER); Chealsea Taylor (USA)	1.79		
Pole vault	Keisa Monterola (VEN)	4.10 CR	Rachel Greff (USA)	3.95	Leah Vause (CAN)	3.85
Long jump	Arantxa King (BER)	6.21 (−0.7 m/s)	Gayle Hunter (USA)	6.15 (+1.5 m/s)	Rhonda Watkins (TRI)	6.05 (+0.9 m/s)
Triple jump	Yanelis Veranes (CUB)	13.54 (+1.7 m/s)	Tânia Ferreira da Silva (BRA)	13.38w (+2.2 m/s)	Verónica Davis (VEN)	13.30w (+2.5 m/s)
Shot put	Sarah Stevens (USA)	16.10	Melissa Faubus (USA)	15.35	Rocío Comba (ARG)	14.41
Discus throw	Lisandra Rodríguez (CUB)	49.86	Shanna Dickenson (USA)	49.68	Yuneimis Soria (CUB)	49.51
Hammer throw	Arasay Tondike (CUB)	64.80 CR	Brittany Riley (USA)	59.72	Marie-Eve Boiselle (CAN)	57.70
Javelin throw	Rachel Yurkovich (USA)	52.58 CR	Kara Patterson (USA)	50.26	Tracy Morrison (BAH)	47.03
Heptathlon	Lauren Stewart (USA)	5333	Shevell Quinley (USA)	5266	Jailma de Lima (BRA)	5025

== Medal table (unofficial) ==
The medal count has been published. It is in agreement with the following unofficial medal count.

* Host nation (Canada)

Rank	Nation	Gold	Silver	Bronze	Total
1	United States	22	25	10	57
2	Cuba	6	4	3	13
3	Jamaica	3	5	3	11
4	Canada*	2	6	10	18
5	Brazil	2	1	6	9
6	Venezuela	2	0	1	3
7	Trinidad and Tobago	1	1	1	3
8	Bermuda	1	1	0	2
8	Peru	1	1	0	2
10	Argentina	1	0	1	2
10	Guatemala	1	0	1	2
12	El Salvador	1	0	0	1
12	Uruguay	1	0	0	1
14	Saint Lucia	0	1	0	1
15	Bahamas	0	0	1	1
15	Barbados	0	0	1	1
15	Colombia	0	0	1	1
15	Mexico	0	0	1	1
15	Netherlands Antilles	0	0	1	1
15	Paraguay	0	0	1	1
15	Puerto Rico	0	0	1	1
Totals (21 entries)		44	45	43	132
