= Nate Englin =

American shot putter

Personal information
- Born: April 24, 1986 (age 40) Shoreview, Minnesota, U.S.

Sport
- Sport: Athletics
- Event(s): Shot put, Weight throw
- University team: University of Missouri

Achievements and titles
- Personal best: 18.90m (Shot put)

Nate Englin (born April 24, 1986) is an American shot putter from Shoreview, Minnesota. He threw for the Missouri Tigers at the University of Missouri.

== Shot put career ==
He competed for Mounds View Track and Field and set the Minnesota state record in the shot put, 65–6 feet, as a junior in 2003; the record stood until 2012.

As a freshman at the University of Missouri in 2005, Englin earned two all-Big 12 honors, both in shot put (indoor and outdoor). He competed in the 2005 Pan American Junior Athletics Championships and the USA Track and Field (USATF) Junior Championships. He earned a silver medal in each competition.

As a sophomore in 2006, Englin qualified for the National Collegiate Athletic Association (NCAA) Championships in the shot put and was named all-Big 12 in outdoor shot put and weight throw (indoor). His best throw came at a meet in Los Angeles in the shot put, when he tossed 62 1/4 feet (18.90m).

== Personal bests ==
INDOOR

- Shot Put: 18.19m, 59-8¼, CMSU Open '06
- Weight Throw: 19.82m, 65-½, Big 12 Indoor '06

OUTDOOR

- Shot Put: 18.90m, 62-¼, UCLA Invite '06
- Discus: 50.66m, 166–2, Arizona St Invite '06
- Hammer Throw: 55.27m, 181–4, Big 12 '06
