= Aundre Edwards =

Jamaican long jumper (born 1980)

Personal information
- Born: 11 December 1980 (age 44)

Sport
- Sport: Track and field

Aundre Edwards (born 11 December 1980 in Kingston, Jamaica) is a retired Jamaican long jumper.

In the young age categories, he won medals at the 1996 CARIFTA Games, the 1996 Central American and Caribbean Junior Championships and the 1998 Central American and Caribbean Junior Championships. He also competed at the 1998 World Junior Championships without reaching the final. He later won the bronze medal at the 2003 Central American and Caribbean Championships and finished seventh at the 2003 Pan American Games.

He became Jamaican champion in 2003. His personal best jump was 8.07 metres, achieved in June 2003 in Kingston.

Edwards was an All-American jumper for the TCU Horned Frogs track and field team, finishing 3rd in the long jump at the 2004 NCAA Division I Indoor Track and Field Championships. He was known for his pre-jump comedy routines before his competitions.
