= Chengetayi Mapaya =

Zimbabwean track and field athlete

Personal information
- Full name: Chengetayi David Mapaya
- Born: 19 December 1998 (age 27)

Sport
- Country: Zimbabwe
- Sport: Track and field
- Event: Triple jump
- College team: TCU Horned Frogs
Medal record
Men's athletics
Representing Zimbabwe
African Championships
Silver medal – second place	2024 Douala	Triple jump
African U20 Championships
Gold medal – first place	2017 Tlemcen	Triple jump

Chengetayi David Mapaya (born 19 December 1998) is a Zimbabwean track and field athlete who competes in the triple jump. He has won two NCAA Division I championships competing for the TCU Horned Frogs at the collegiate level in the United States. Competing internationally for his home country, he took home the gold medal at the 2017 African U20 Championships and has qualified for the 2022 World Championships.

== Career ==
Growing up in Harare, Zimbabwe, Mapaya attended high school at the private St. George's College. He won gold in the triple jump and silver in the long jump at the 2016 African Union Sports Council Region 5 U20 Youth Games in Angola, then took gold in the triple jump at the 2017 African U20 Championships in Tlemcen, Algeria, where he set a new meet record with a 16.30m jump.

After high school, Mapaya relocated to the United States to attend Texas Christian University in Fort Worth, Texas. During his time competing in triple jump for the Horned Frogs, he won two NCAA Division I national championships, five Big 12 conference championships and earned All-American honors nine times.

== Achievements ==
All information taken from World Athletics profile.

=== Collegiate championship results ===
Representing the TCU Horned Frogs in Triple Jump (2018–2022)
Year	Competition	Position	Distance	Venue	Notes
2018	Big 12 Indoor Championships	3rd	16.16m	Ames, Iowa	
2018	NCAA Indoor Championships	3rd	16.38m	College Station, Texas	PB
2018	Big 12 Outdoor Championships	3rd	15.73m	Waco, Texas	
2018	NCAA Outdoor Championships	5th	16.42m	Eugene, Oregon	PB
2019	Big 12 Indoor Championships	1st	16.83m	Lubbock, Texas	New school record and meet record
2019	NCAA Indoor Championships	3rd	16.61m	Birmingham, Alabama	
2019	Big 12 Outdoor Championships	1st	16.52m	Norman, Oklahoma	
2019	NCAA Outdoor Championships	1st	17.13m	Austin, Texas	PB
2020	Big 12 Indoor Championships	2nd	16.06m	Ames, Iowa	
2021	Big 12 Indoor Championships	1st	16.55m	Lubbock, Texas	
2021	NCAA Indoor Championships	2nd	16.95m	Fayetteville, Arkansas	PB, New Zimbabwean national indoor record
2021	Big 12 Outdoor Championships	1st	17.01m	Manhattan, Kansas	
2021	NCAA Outdoor Championships	3rd	16.74m	Eugene, Oregon	
2022	Big 12 Indoor Championships	2nd	16.28m	Ames, Iowa	
2022	NCAA Indoor Championships	3rd	16.51m	Birmingham, Alabama	
2022	Big 12 Outdoor Championships	1st	16.84m	Lubbock, Texas	
2022	NCAA Outdoor Championships	1st	17.26m	Eugene, Oregon	PB, New school record

- DNF = did not finish
- DQ = disqualified
- PB = personal best
- NR = national (American) record
- CR = collegiate record

=== National titles ===
- NCAA Division I Men's Outdoor Track and Field Championships
  - Triple jump: 2019, 2022
