= James Maness =

American football player (born 1963)

No. 81
- Position: Wide receiver

Personal information
- Born: May 1, 1963; Decatur, Texas, U.S.
- Died: September 21, 2024 (aged 61); Azle, Texas, U.S.
- Listed height: 6 ft 1 in (1.85 m)
- Listed weight: 174 lb (79 kg)

Career information
- High school: Decatur
- College: TCU
- NFL draft: 1985: 3rd round, 78th overall pick

Career history
- Chicago Bears (1985)

Awards and highlights
- Super Bowl champion (XX); Third-team All-American (1984); 2× First-team All-SWC (1983, 1984)

Career NFL statistics
- Receptions: 1
- Receiving yards: 34
- Return yards: 9
- Stats at Pro Football Reference

James Maness (May 1, 1963 – September 21, 2024) was an American professional football player who was a wide receiver for the Chicago Bears of the National Football League (NFL).

== Early life ==
Maness was born and raised in Decatur, Texas and played scholastically at Decatur High School.

== College career ==
Maness played football and ran track for the TCU Horned Frogs. In track, he was a two-time All-American in two different relay events. His 4x100 relay team finished sixth overall in the 1983 NCAA Outdoor Championships and in 1984 his 4x400 relay team finished sixth, as well. In football, Maness was an All-SWC receiver his junior and senior seasons and a third-team Associated Press All-American in his senior year. Maness was inducted into the TCU Athletics Hall of Fame in 2007.

== Professional career ==
Maness was selected by the Bears in the third round of the 1985 NFL draft with the 78th overall pick, and was a member of the Bears team that won Super Bowl XX. In his one season with the Bears, Maness played eight games for the Bears, catching one pass for 34 yards and returning two punts, before a groin injury cut his season short. His pro career was then derailed by positive drug tests.

== Personal ==
Maness died September 21, 2024 in Azle, Texas after a lengthy battle with early onset Alzheimer’s and dementia.

He is survived by his wife Tiffany Maness and eight children.
