= Garrett Kaalund =

American athlete (born 2004)

Personal information
- Born: 25 January 2004 (age 22)

Sport
- Sport: Athletics
- Event: Sprint

Achievements and titles
- Personal bests: 100m: 10.31 (2025); 200m: 19.85 (2025); Indoor; 200m: 19.95 (2026) NR
Medal record
Men's athletics
Representing United States
Pan American U20 Championships
Silver medal – second place	2023 Mayagüez	200 m

Garrett Kaalund (born 25 January 2004) is an American sprinter. In 2026, he won the 2026 USA Outdoor Track and Field Championships in the 200 metres. That year, he also became the second-fastest man to run 200 metres indoors, and the first American to run under 20 seconds indoors at the distance, winning the 2026 NCAA Indoor Championships. His time of 19.95 is also the American collegiate record.

== Early and personal life ==
Kaalund was born in Stockbridge, Georgia. He is the son of the late Eric Michael Kaalund (1958-2020) and Anne Kaalund. He moved to San Antonio, Texas in 2007. He attended Antonian College Preparatory High School. He competed predominantly over 100 metres and 200 metres before later also running over 400 metres, winning the Texan South Region high school titles in the 200m and 400m in May 2022. He later attended the University of Nebraska–Lincoln. He transferred to the University of Southern California in 2025.

== Career ==
Kaalund won the silver medal over 200 metres at the 2023 Pan American U20 Athletics Championships in Mayagüez, Puerto Rico, finishing behind Renan Correa of Brazil in August 2023.

In March 2025, he was a member of the University of Southern California team which won the overall 2025 NCAA Indoor Championships team title in Virginia Beach, their first team title for 53 years. That month, he ran 20.05 seconds for the 200 metres at the Battle on the Bayou in Baton Rouge.

In April 2025, he ran a wind-assisted 9.93 seconds for the 100 metres (+2.4 m/s). In May, at the NCAA West First Round, he ran the 200m in 19.85 seconds (+1.1 m/s), to move to joint seventh on the NCAA all-time list. He finished third over 200 metres in 19.96 seconds at the 2025 NCAA Outdoor Championships in Eugene, Oregon, helping his University of Southern California team to a share of the overall men's title.

Kaalund opened his 2026 indoor season with a time of 32.10 in the 300 meters at The Spokane Sports Showcase, the second-fastest performance in NCAA indoor history for the distance. On 6 February 2026, he ran 20.12 for the 200 metres in New Mexico, breaking the USC school record set by Olympic champion Andre De Grasse in 2015. That month, he moved to third on the all-time list for the indoor 200 metres, running 20.06 seconds at the Big Ten Indoor Championships to move behind Frankie Fredericks (19.92 in 1996) and Elijah Hall (20.02 in 2018).

Kaalund won the 2026 NCAA Indoor Championships on 14 March with a winning time of 19.95 seconds, moving past Hall to set a new American indoor national record and the American collegiate record. He also became second on the world all-time list and the first American to run the distance indoors in under 20 seconds.

The following month, Kaalund ran a wind-assisted 9.90-second (+2.8) for the 100 metres at the Mt. SAC Relays, California. Later also setting an NCAA-leading 20.10 seconds for the outdoor 200 m. In May, he failed to finish the 200 metres in consecutive races at the Big Ten Outdoor Championships and the NCAA West Regionals. Competing at the 2026 USA Outdoor Track and Field Championships on 26 July, he won the 200 metres national title in 20.04 seconds, finishing ahead of Brandon Hicklin and Max Thomas, who both finished in 20.29 with defending champion Noah Lyles failing to finish the race.
