= Michael Cannon (sprinter) =

American sprinter (born 1964)

Michael Cannon (born 1964) was a five-time All-American sprinter at TCU.

== High school ==
Cannon attended South Oak Cliff High School. As a senior, in 1983, he set the all-time Texas state record in the 400 meter dash (45.48). That record wasn't broken until 1994, 11 years later. As of 2021, his time remains the state's 3rd fastest time. In 1983, he was ranked 1st nationally among quarter milers. Cannon ran first leg on the U.S. mile relay team that set the Jr. World Record in 1983.

Cannon also ran a 10.4 100 meter and a 20.9 200 meter.

== College ==
In 1985, Cannon set the TCU record for the 400 meters (45.14), a record that lasted almost 20 years, until 2004. By the end of his college career, Cannon had run 4 of the 6 fastest 400-meter races ever run by a TCU sprinter. Cannon also anchored the school-record indoor mile relay team that won the Southwest Conference crown in 1984 along with the indoor world best.

Cannon was a five-time NCAA All American and was named TCU's Outstanding Track athlete in 1985.

== National competition ==
Cannon finished 5th in the 400 meter outdoor competition at the 1985 NCAA championships, and then finished 4th in 1986.

Cannon was a quarterfinalist in the 400 meters at the 1984 U.S. Olympic Trials in the 400 meters.
