= Robert Gregory (sprinter) =

American athlete (born 2001)

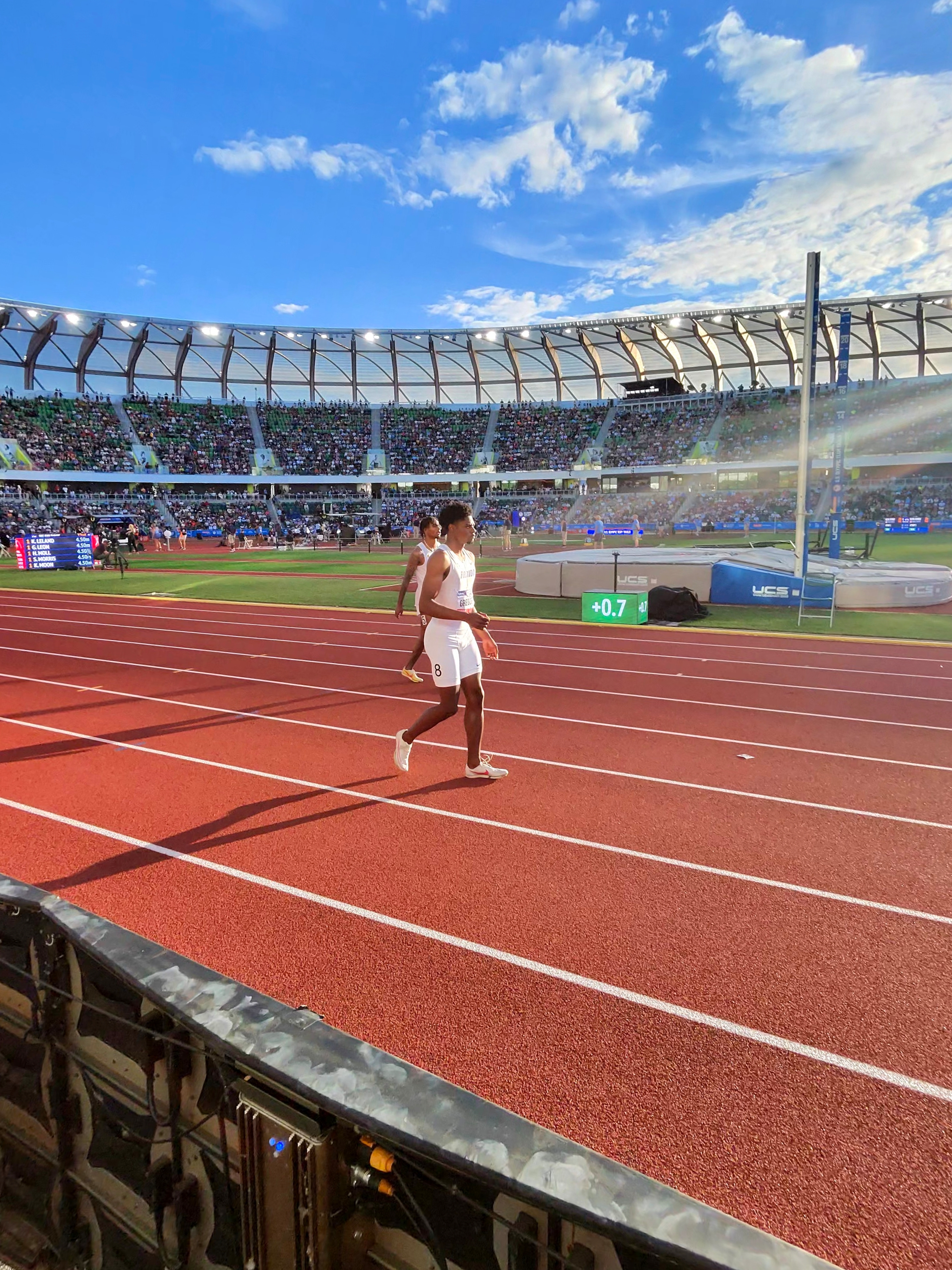
- Gregory in 2024

Personal information
- Born: 12 December 2001 (age 24)

Sport
- Sport: Athletics
- Event: Sprint

Achievements and titles
- Personal bests: 100m: 10.04 (Austin, 2023); 200m: 19.80 (Eugene, 2025)

Robert Gregory (born 12 December 2001) is an American track and field athlete who competes as a sprinter.

== Early life ==
From Houston, Texas, Gregory is from a family of track athletes. He attended Wheatley High School where he played as a defensive back in American football as well as competing in athletics. He trained as a member of Greater Houston Track Club and initially attended Texas Christian University before transferring to the University of Florida.

== Career ==
Gregory was runner up at the 2022 NCAA Division I Indoor Track and Field Championships over 60 metres. He won the SEC 200m title in 20.12 seconds, in Baton Rouge in May 2023. At the 2023 NCAA Division I Outdoor Track and Field Championships, held in Austin, Texas in June 2023, Gregory set a new personal best for the 200m, running 19.89 to finish fourth in the final.

Competing at the 2023 USA Outdoor Track and Field Championships, in Eugene, Oregon, Gregory ran 19.90 in the final of the 200m, the fastest-ever time for 5th place, in USATF history.

He finished second at the 2024 NCAA Division I Outdoor Track and Field Championships 200 metres in Eugene, Oregon in 20.08 seconds. He competed at the US Olympic Trials in June 2024, where he reached the final of the 200 metres and placed seventh overall.

In May 2025, he won the 200 metres at the Golden Grand Prix in Tokyo in 20.24 seconds to finish ahead of former Olympic champion Andre De Grasse. The previous month, he had finished runner-up to De Grasse at the Florida Relays in Gainesville at the same distance. He finished fourth in the 200 metres at the 2025 Meeting International Mohammed VI d'Athlétisme de Rabat, part of the 2025 Diamond League, in May 2025 and fourth at the 2025 Prefontaine Classic on 5 July.

He placed third in the 200 metres at the 2025 USA Outdoor Track and Field Championships in Eugene, with a 19.80 seconds personal best running from Lane 9 to finish just behind a feuding Noah Lyles and Kenny Bednarek. He finished second in 20.19 seconds in the 200m in the Diamond League event, the 2025 Memorial Van Damme, in Brussels, Belgium, on 22 August. He placed fourth in the 200 metres at the Diamond League Final in Zurich on 28 August.

In September 2025, he competed in the 200 metres at the 2025 World Championships in Tokyo, Japan.
