= Indya Mayberry =

American athlete (born 2005)

Personal information
- Nationality: American
- Born: 2005 (age 20–21)
- Education: Texas Christian University

Sport
- Sport: Athletics
- Event: Sprint

Achievements and titles
- Personal best(s): 60m: 7.11 (2025); 100m: 11.21 (2024); 200m: 22.30 (2025)

Indya Mayberry (born 2005) is an American sprinter. She won the 2025 NCAA Indoor Championships over 200 metres.

== Early life ==
From Fort Worth, Texas, Mayberry attended North Crowley High School. She ran a wind-legal time of 22.82 metres for the 200 metres in May 2024, to break the state high school record from 2007 set by Tiffany Townsend. She was also state high school champion in the 100 metres.

== Career ==
Competing for Texas Christian University, Mayberry won over 200 metres at the New Mexico Collegiate Classic in February 2025, running the event in a time of 22.41 seconds which broke the program record in just her second collegiate run in the event. In March 2025, she won the Women's 200m race at the 2025 NCAA Indoor Championships in Virginia Beach, in a personal best time of 22.30 seconds.

In March 2025 at the Texas Relays, she ran a wind assisted 10.91 in the women's 100 meters (+3.9). She won both the 100 metres and 200 metres at the Big 12 Conference finals in May 2025, running 11.03 seconds for the 100m and 22.47 seconds for the 200m.

In June 2025, she signed an NIL deal with Swiss shoe company On. In March 2026, she placed sixth in the final of the 200 metres at the 2026 NCAA Indoor Championships in 22.81 seconds. In June, she qualified for the 2026 NCAA Outdoor Championships.
