= 200 metres =

Sprint running event

Athletics 200 metres
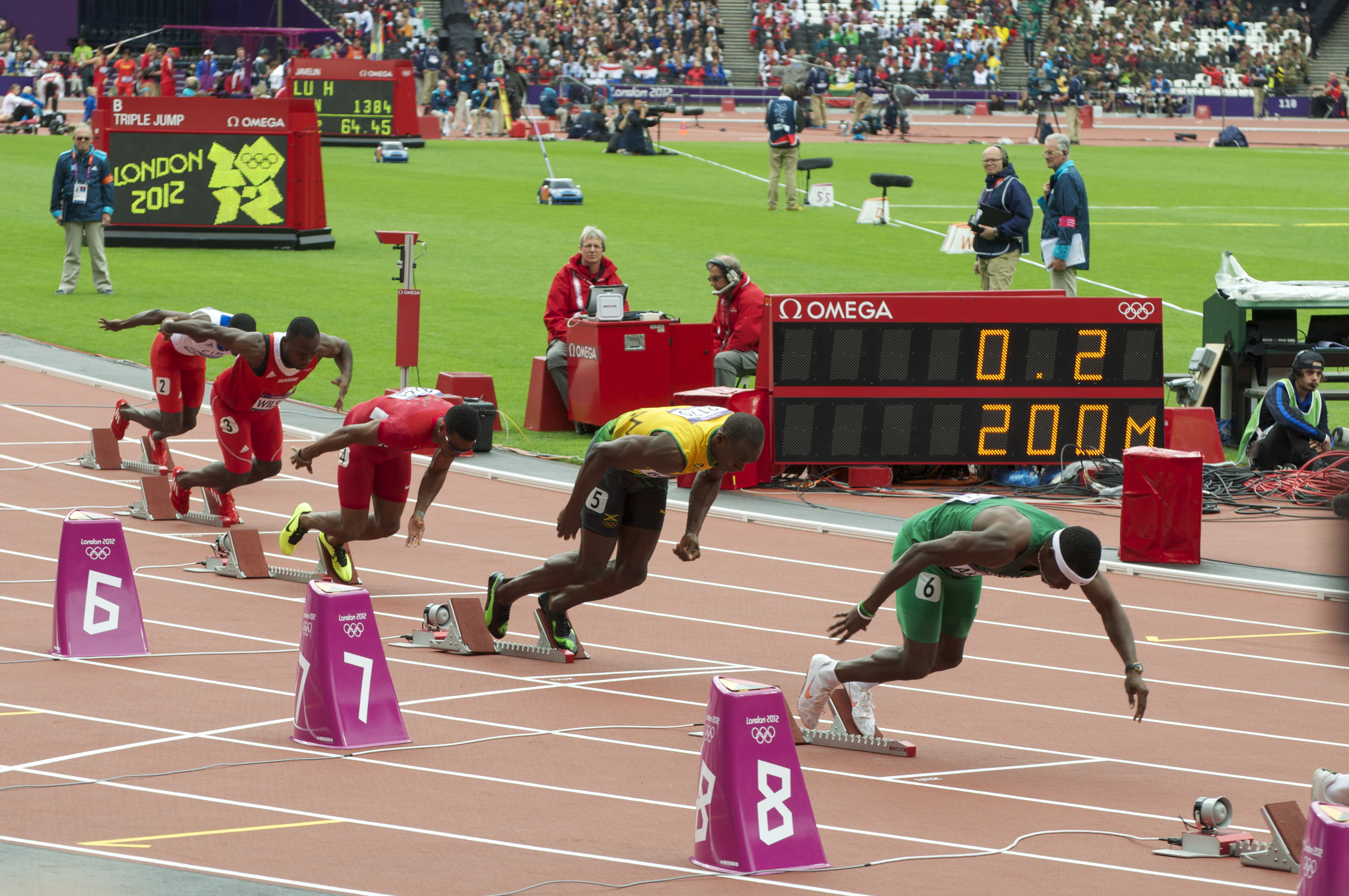
- Athletes leaving starting blocks for a 200 metres heat at the 2012 Olympic Games

World records
- Men: Usain Bolt (JAM) 19.19 (2009)
- Women: Florence Griffith Joyner (USA) 21.34 (1988)

Short track world records
- Men: Frankie Fredericks (NAM) 19.92 (1996)
- Women: Merlene Ottey (JAM) 21.87 (1993)

Olympic records
- Men: Usain Bolt (JAM) 19.30 (2008)
- Women: Florence Griffith Joyner (USA) 21.34 (1988)

World Championship records
- Men: Usain Bolt (JAM) 19.19 (2009)
- Women: Shericka Jackson (JAM) 21.41 (2023)

World junior (U20) records
- Men: Gout Gout (AUS) 19.67 (2026)
- Women: Christine Mboma (NAM) 21.78 (2021)

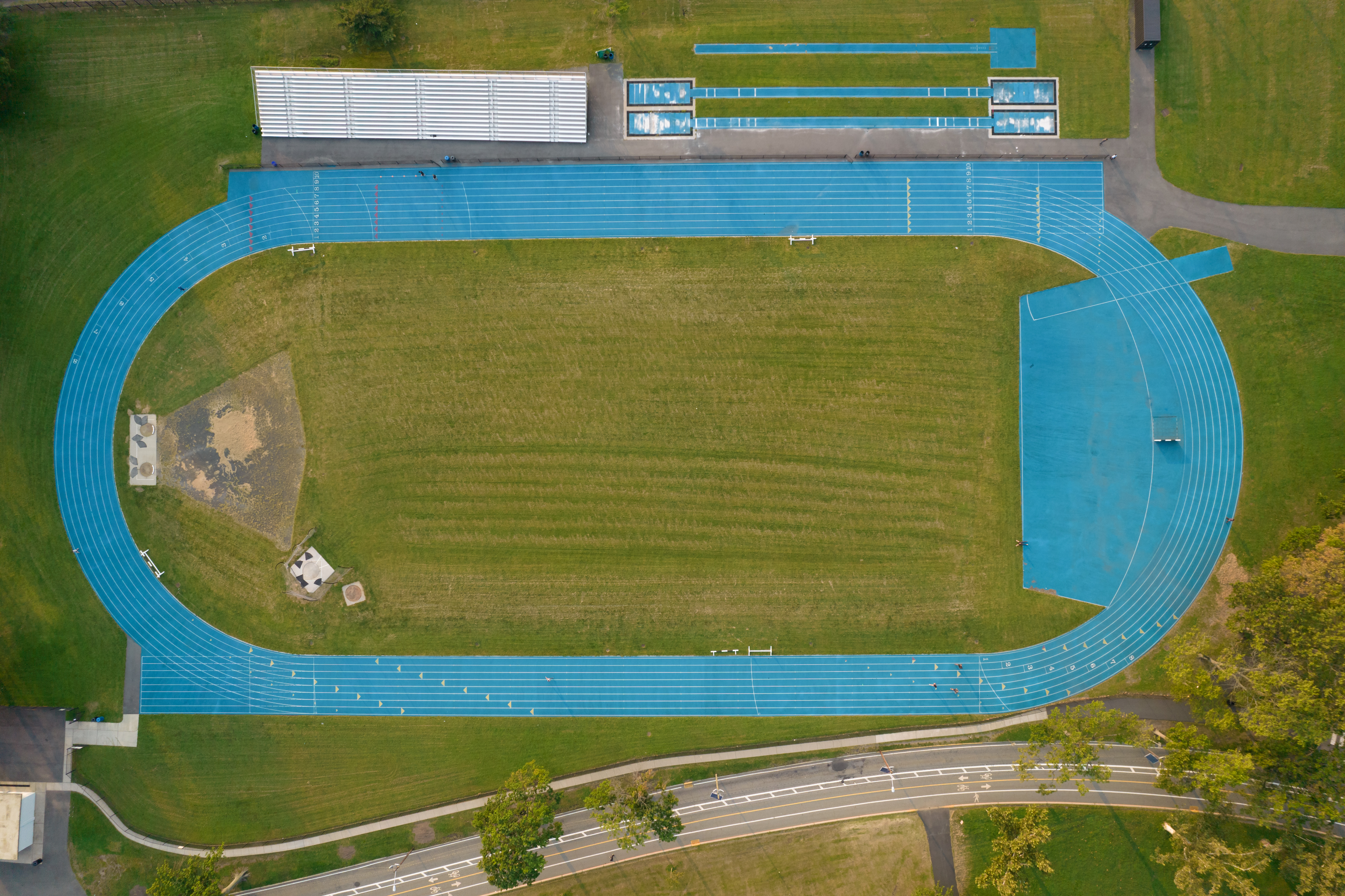
Start (green) and end (red) points of a 200 metre race, marked on a running track

The 200 metres, or 200-meter dash, is a sprint running event. On an outdoor 400-metre racetrack, the race begins on the curve and ends on the home straight, so a combination of techniques is needed to successfully run the race. A slightly shorter race, called the stadion and run on a straight track, was the first recorded event at the ancient Olympic Games. The 200 m places more emphasis on speed endurance than shorter sprint distances as athletes predominantly rely on anaerobic energy system during the 200 m sprint. Similarly to other sprint distances, the 200 m begins from the starting blocks. When the sprinters adopt the 'set' position in the blocks they are able to adopt a more efficient starting posture and isometrically preload their muscles. This enables them to stride forwards more powerfully when the race begins and start faster.

In the United States and elsewhere, athletes previously ran the 220-yard dash (201.168 m) instead of the 200 m (218.723 yards), though the distance is now obsolete. The standard adjustment used for the conversion from times recorded over 220 yards to 200 m times is to subtract 0.1 seconds, but other conversion methods exist. Another obsolete version of this race is the 200 metres straight, which was run on tracks that contained such a straight. Initially, when the International Amateur Athletic Association (now known as the International Association of Athletics Federations) started to ratify world records in 1912, only records set on a straight track were eligible for consideration. In 1951, the IAAF started to recognise records set on a curved track. In 1976, the straight record was discarded.

The event has been on the Olympic athletics programme since 1900 for men and since 1948 for women. The race attracts runners from other events, primarily the 100 metres, wishing to double up and claim both titles. This feat has been achieved by men eleven times at the Olympic Games: by Archie Hahn in 1904, Ralph Craig in 1912, Percy Williams in 1928, Eddie Tolan in 1932, Jesse Owens in 1936, Bobby Morrow in 1956, Valeriy Borzov in 1972, Carl Lewis in 1984, and most recently by Jamaica's Usain Bolt in 2008, 2012, and 2016. The double has been accomplished by women eight times: by Fanny Blankers-Koen in 1948, Marjorie Jackson in 1952, Betty Cuthbert in 1956, Wilma Rudolph in 1960, Renate Stecher in 1972, Florence Griffith Joyner in 1988, and Elaine Thompson-Herah in 2016 and 2021. Marion Jones finished first in both races in 2000 but was later disqualified and stripped of her medals after admitting to taking performance-enhancing drugs. An Olympic double of 200 m and 400 m was first achieved by Valerie Brisco-Hooks in 1984, and later by Michael Johnson from the United States and Marie-José Pérec of France both in 1996. Usain Bolt is the only man to repeat as Olympic champion, Bärbel Wöckel (née Eckert), Veronica Campbell-Brown and Elaine Thompson-Herah are the three women who have repeated as Olympic champion.

The men's world record holder is Usain Bolt of Jamaica, who ran 19.19 seconds at the 2009 World Championships. The women's world record holder is Florence Griffith Joyner of the United States, who ran 21.34 seconds at the 1988 Summer Olympics. The reigning Olympic champions are Letsile Tebogo (BOT) and Gabby Thomas (USA). The reigning World Champions are Noah Lyles (USA) and Melissa Jefferson-Wooden (USA).

Races run with an aiding wind measured over 2.0 metres per second are not acceptable for record purposes.

Athletics Men's 200 Final, 27th Summer Universiade 2013, Kazan

== Area records ==
- Updated 28 September 2026.

Area	Men				Women			
Area	Time (s)	Wind (m/s)	Season	Athlete	Time (s)	Wind (m/s)	Season	Athlete
World	19.19	−0.3	2009	Usain Bolt (JAM)	21.34	+1.3	1988	Florence Griffith Joyner (USA)
Area records
Africa (records)	19.46	+0.4	2024	Letsile Tebogo (BOT)	21.78	+0.6	2021	Christine Mboma (NAM)
Asia (records)	19.88	+0.9	2019	Xie Zhenye (CHN)	22.01	±0.0	1997	Li Xuemei (CHN)
Asia (records)	19.88	−0.3	2026	Puripol Boonson (THA)	22.01	±0.0	1997	Li Xuemei (CHN)
Europe (records)	19.72 A	+1.8	1979	Pietro Mennea (ITA)	21.63	+0.2	2015	Dafne Schippers (NED)
North, Central America and Caribbean (records)	19.19	−0.3	2009	Usain Bolt (JAM)	21.34	+1.3	1988	Florence Griffith Joyner (USA)
Oceania (records)	19.67	+1.7	2026	Gout Gout (AUS)	22.23	+0.8	1997	Melinda Gainsford (AUS)
South America (records)	19.81	−0.3	2009	Alonso Edward (PAN)	22.47	+1.4	2022	Vitória Cristina Rosa (BRA)

== All-time top 25 ==
Outdoor tables show data for two definitions of "Top 25" - the top 25 200 m times and the top 25 athletes:
- denotes top performance for athletes in the top 25 200 m times
- denotes lesser performances, still in the top 25 200 m times, by repeat athletes
- denotes top performance (only) for other top 25 athletes who fall outside the top 25 200 m times

=== Men (outdoor) ===
- Updated September 2026

Ath.#	Perf.#	Time (s)	Wind (m/s)	Reaction (s)	Athlete	Nation	Date	Place	Ref.
1	1	19.19	−0.3	0.133	Usain Bolt	Jamaica	20 August 2009	Berlin	
2	2	19.26	+0.7	0.269	Yohan Blake	Jamaica	16 September 2011	Brussels	
	3	19.30	−0.9	0.182	Bolt #2		20 August 2008	Beijing	
3	4	19.31	+0.4	0.141	Noah Lyles	United States	21 July 2022	Eugene	
4	5	19.32	+0.4	0.161	Michael Johnson	United States	1 August 1996	Atlanta	
	5	19.32	+0.4	0.180	Bolt #3		9 August 2012	London	
	7	19.40	+0.8	0.193	Bolt #4		3 September 2011	Daegu	
	8	19.44	+0.4	0.172	Blake #2		9 August 2012	London	
	9	19.46	+0.8	0.199	Lyles #2		10 August 2022	Monaco	
5	9	19.46	+0.4	0.162	Letsile Tebogo	Botswana	8 August 2024	Saint-Denis	
	11	19.47	+1.6	0.157	Lyles #3		23 July 2023	London	
6	12	19.49	+1.4		Erriyon Knighton	United States	30 April 2022	Baton Rouge	
	13	19.50	+1.6	0.170	Tebogo #2		23 July 2023	London	
	13	19.50	−0.1	0.147	Lyles #4		5 July 2019	Lausanne	
	15	19.51	+1.0	0.181	Lyles #5		18 September 2025	Tokyo	
	16	19.52	+1.5	0.142	Lyles #6		21 August 2021	Eugene	
	16	19.52	−0.6	0.164	Lyles #7		8 September 2022	Zürich	
	16	19.52	−0.2	0.144	Lyles #8		25 August 2023	Budapest	
	16	19.52	±0.0	0.167	Lyles #9		19 September 2025	Tokyo	
7	16	19.52	−0.1	0.171	Kenny Bednarek	United States	13 September 2026	Budapest	
8	21	19.53	+0.7	0.185	Walter Dix	United States	16 September 2011	Brussels	
	21	19.53	+0.5		Lyles #10		29 June 2024	Eugene	
	23	19.54	±0.0	0.165	Blake #3		7 September 2012	Brussels	
	24	19.55	−0.1	0.147	Bolt #5		27 August 2015	Beijing	
	24	19.55	+0.4	0.148	Tebogo #3		5 September 2024	Zürich	
9		19.57	+0.4	0.177	Justin Gatlin	United States	28 June 2015	Eugene	
10		19.58	+1.3		Tyson Gay	United States	30 May 2009	New York City	
11		19.62	−0.5	0.135	Andre De Grasse	Canada	4 August 2021	Tokyo	
12		19.63	+0.4		Xavier Carter	United States	11 July 2006	Lausanne	
12		19.63	+1.2		Reynier Mena	Cuba	3 July 2022	La Chaux-de-Fonds	
12		19.63	+1.5		Jaiden Reid	Cayman Islands	12 June 2026	Eugene	
15		19.64	±0.0	0.147	Bryan Levell	Jamaica	19 September 2025	Tokyo	
16		19.65	±0.0		Wallace Spearmon	United States	28 September 2006	Daegu	
17		19.67	+1.7		Gout Gout	Australia	12 April 2026	Sydney	
18		19.68	+0.4		Frankie Fredericks	Namibia	1 August 1996	Atlanta	
19		19.69 A	−0.5		Clarence Munyai	South Africa	16 March 2018	Pretoria	
20		19.70	+0.7		Michael Norman	United States	6 June 2019	Rome	
21		19.71 A	−1.5		Courtney Lindsey	United States	20 April 2024	Nairobi	
22		19.72 A	+1.8		Pietro Mennea	Italy	12 September 1979	Mexico City	
23		19.73	−0.2		Michael Marsh	United States	5 August 1992	Barcelona	
23		19.73	+0.8		Divine Oduduru	Nigeria	7 June 2019	Austin	
23		19.73	+1.6	0.130	Zharnel Hughes	Great Britain	23 July 2023	London	
23		19.73	+1.8		T'Mars McCallum	United States	12 July 2025	Memphis	

==== Assisted marks ====
Any performance with a following wind of more than 2.0 metres per second is not counted for record purposes. Below is a list of wind-assisted times (equal or superior to 19.73). Only times that are superior to legal bests are shown:

- Kenny Bednarek ran 19.49 A (+6.1 m/s) in Hobbs, New Mexico on 17 May 2019.
- Andre De Grasse ran 19.58 (+2.4 m/s) in Eugene, Oregon on 12 June 2015.
- Tarsis Orogot ran 19.60 (+2.9 m/s) in Gainesville, Florida on 14 April 2023.
- Robert Gregory ran 19.60 (+4.8 m/s) in Jacksonville, Florida on 26 May 2023.
- Leroy Burrell ran 19.61 (+4.1 m/s) in College Station, Texas on 19 May 1990. Until 1 August 1996, it was the best performance in any condition.
- Terrance Laird ran 19.64 A (+5.6 m/s) in Hobbs, New Mexico on 17 May 2019.
- Micaiah Harris ran 19.72 (+3.8 m/s) in Lubbock, Texas on 15 May 2022.
- Shawn Crawford ran 19.73 (+3.3 m/s) in Eugene, Oregon on 28 June 2009.

=== Women (outdoor) ===
- Updated September 2026

Ath.#	Perf.#	Time (s)	Wind (m/s)	Reaction (s)	Athlete	Nation	Date	Place	Ref.
1	1	21.34	+1.3	0.205	Florence Griffith Joyner	United States	29 September 1988	Seoul	
2	2	21.41	+0.1	0.161	Shericka Jackson	Jamaica	25 August 2023	Budapest	
	3	21.45	+0.6	0.144	Jackson #2		21 July 2022	Eugene	
3	4	21.47	−0.6	0.169	Melissa Jefferson-Wooden	United States	13 September 2026	Budapest	
	5	21.48	+0.2	0.161	Jackson #3		8 September 2023	Brussels	
4	6	21.51	+0.9	0.172	Julien Alfred	Saint Lucia	10 July 2026	Monaco	
5	7	21.53	+0.8	0.173	Elaine Thompson-Herah	Jamaica	3 August 2021	Tokyo	
	8	21.55	±0.0		Jackson #4		26 June 2022	Kingston	
	9	21.56	+1.7	0.156	Griffith Joyner #2		29 September 1988	Seoul	
	10	21.57	+0.3	0.152	Jackson #5		17 September 2023	Eugene	
6	11	21.60	−0.4	0.173	Gabby Thomas	United States	9 July 2023	Eugene	
	12	21.61	+1.3		Thomas #2		26 June 2021	Eugene	
7	13	21.62 A	−0.6	0.258	Marion Jones	United States	11 September 1998	Johannesburg	
8	14	21.63	+0.2	0.149	Dafne Schippers	Netherlands	28 August 2015	Beijing	
9	15	21.64	+0.8		Merlene Ottey	Jamaica	13 September 1991	Brussels	
	16	21.66	−1.0		Ottey #2		15 August 1990	Zürich	
	16	21.66	+0.2	0.195	Thompson-Herah #2		28 August 2015	Beijing	
	16	21.66	+0.3	0.165	Thompson-Herah #3		2 August 2021	Tokyo	
	16	21.66	+0.1	0.152	Alfred #2		18 July 2026	London	
	20	21.67	+2.0	0.137	Jackson #6		19 July 2022	Eugene	
	21	21.68	−0.1	0.170	Jefferson-Wooden #2		19 September 2025	Tokyo	
10	21	21.68	−0.4		Adaejah Hodge	British Virgin Islands	13 June 2026	Eugene	
11	23	21.69	+1.0		Allyson Felix	United States	30 June 2012	Eugene	
	23	21.69	+1.0		Jefferson-Wooden #3		26 July 2026	New York City	
	25	21.70	+0.7		Thomas #3		6 June 2026	College Station	
12		21.71	+0.7		Marita Koch	East Germany	10 June 1979	Karl-Marx-Stadt	
12		21.71	+1.2	0.190	Heike Drechsler	East Germany	29 June 1986	Jena	
14		21.72	+1.3	0.195	Grace Jackson	Jamaica	29 September 1988	Seoul	
14		21.72	−0.1		Gwen Torrence	United States	5 August 1992	Barcelona	
16		21.74	+0.4		Marlies Göhr	East Germany	3 June 1984	Erfurt	
16		21.74	+1.2	0.155	Silke Gladisch	East Germany	3 September 1987	Rome	
16		21.74	+0.6	0.172	Veronica Campbell-Brown	Jamaica	21 August 2008	Beijing	
16		21.74	−0.4	0.143	Shaunae Miller-Uibo	Bahamas	29 August 2019	Zürich	
20		21.75	−0.1		Juliet Cuthbert	Jamaica	5 August 1992	Barcelona	
21		21.77	+0.6		Inger Miller	United States	27 August 1999	Seville	
21		21.77	+1.5		Tori Bowie	United States	27 May 2017	Eugene	
21		21.77	−0.3		Abby Steiner	United States	26 June 2022	Eugene	
24		21.78	+0.6		Christine Mboma	Namibia	9 September 2021	Zürich	
25		21.79	+0.8		Shelly-Ann Fraser-Pryce	Jamaica	27 June 2021	Kingston	

==== Assisted marks ====
Any performance with a following wind of more than 2.0 metres per second is not counted for record purposes. Below is a list of wind-assisted times (equal or superior to 21.79). Only times that are superior to legal bests are shown:

- Sha'Carri Richardson ran 21.61 (+2.6 m/s) in Eugene, Oregon on 8 July 2023.
- Tamara Clark ran 21.72 (+3.1 m/s) in Austin, Texas on 26 March 2022.
- Favour Ofili ran 21.74 (+2.8 m/s) in Memphis, Tennessee on 10 July 2026.
- Madison Whyte ran 21.78 (+6.0 m/s) in Lincoln, Nebraska on 17 May 2026.

=== Men (indoor) ===
- Updated March 2026.

Rank	Time	Athlete	Nation	Date	Place	Ref.
1	19.92	Frankie Fredericks	Namibia	18 February 1996	Liévin	
2	19.95	Garrett Kaalund	United States	14 March 2026	Fayetteville	
3	20.02	Elijah Hall	United States	10 March 2018	College Station	
4	20.08	Divine Oduduru	Nigeria	23 February 2019	Lubbock	
5	20.10	Wallace Spearmon	United States	12 March 2005	Fayetteville	
6	20.11	Christian Coleman	United States	11 March 2017	College Station	
6	20.11	Jelani Watkins	United States	13 March 2026	Fayetteville	
8	20.12 A	Matthew Boling	United States	11 March 2023	Albuquerque	
9	20.13	Courtney Lindsey	United States	25 February 2023	Lubbock	
9	20.13	Makanakaishe Charamba	Zimbabwe	27 February 2025	College Station	
11	20.17 A	Udodi Onwuzurike	Nigeria	10 March 2023	Albuquerque	
11	20.17 A	Tarsis Orogot	Uganda	10 March 2023	Albuquerque	
11	20.17	Wanya McCoy	Bahamas	14 March 2026	Fayetteville	
14	20.19	Trayvon Bromell	United States	14 March 2015	Fayetteville	
15	20.20	Terrance Laird	United States	13 March 2021	Fayetteville	
15	20.20	Tapiwanashe Makarawu	Zimbabwe	27 February 2025	College Station	
17	20.21	Erriyon Knighton	United States	11 February 2024	Liévin	
17	20.21	Terrence Jones	Bahamas	24 February 2024	Lubbock	
18	20.22 A	Robert Gregory	United States	11 March 2023	Albuquerque	
19	20.24	Alexander Ogando	Dominican Republic	8 February 2026	Val-de-Reuil	
20	20.25	Linford Christie	Great Britain	19 February 1995	Liévin	
22	20.26	Obadele Thompson	Barbados	6 March 1999	Maebashi	
22	20.26	Shawn Crawford	United States	10 March 2000	Fayetteville	
22	20.26	John Capel	United States	10 March 2000	Fayetteville	
22	20.26	Andre De Grasse	Canada	14 March 2015	Fayetteville	

==== Notes ====
Below is a list of other times equal or superior to 20.26:

- Garrett Kaalund also ran 20.06 (2026), 20.11 (2026) and 20.12 A (2026).
- Frankie Fredericks also ran 20.10 (1999), 20.18 (1999) and 20.26 (1995).
- Wallace Spearmon also ran 20.10 (2005), 20.19 (2008) and 20.21 (2005).
- Divine Oduduru also ran 20.18 (2018) and 20.21 (2018).
- Matthew Boling also ran 20.19 (2021).
- Tarsis Orogot also ran 20.20 A (2023 × 2).
- Trayvon Bromell also ran 20.23 (2015).
- Terrence Jones also ran 20.23 (2024).
- Wanya McCoy also ran 20.25 (2025).
- Elijah Hall also ran 20.26 (2018).
- Jelani Watkins also ran 20.26 (2026).

=== Women (indoor) ===
- Updated February 2026.

Rank	Time	Athlete	Nation	Date	Place	Ref.
1	21.87	Merlene Ottey	Jamaica	13 February 1993	Liévin	
2	22.01 A	Julien Alfred	Saint Lucia	11 March 2023	Albuquerque	
3	22.09	Abby Steiner	United States	26 February 2022	College Station	
4	22.10	Irina Privalova	Russia	19 February 1995	Liévin	
5	22.11 A	Favour Ofili	Nigeria	10 March 2023	Albuquerque	
6	22.22	Adaejah Hodge	British Virgin Islands	14 March 2026	Fayetteville	
7	22.27	Heike Drechsler	East Germany	7 March 1987	Indianapolis	
8	22.30	Indya Mayberry	United States	15 March 2025	Virginia Beach	
9	22.33	Gwen Torrence	United States	2 March 1996	Atlanta	
10	22.34	JaMeesia Ford	United States	9 March 2024	Boston	
11	22.38	Veronica Campbell-Brown	Jamaica	18 February 2005	Birmingham	
11	22.38	Gabby Thomas	United States	10 March 2018	College Station	
13	22.39	Marita Koch	East Germany	5 March 1983	Budapest	
13	22.39	Ionela Târlea	Romania	6 March 1999	Maebashi	
13	22.39 A	Niesha Burgher	Jamaica	14 February 2025	Albuquerque	
16	22.40	Bianca Knight	United States	14 March 2008	Fayetteville	
16	22.40	Shaunae Miller-Uibo	Bahamas	31 January 2021	Fayetteville	
18	22.41	Galina Malchugina	Russia	13 March 1994	Paris	
18	22.41	Ashley Henderson	United States	10 March 2018	College Station	
20	22.42	Ariana Washington	United States	11 March 2017	College Station	
20	22.42 A	Autumn Wilson	United States	10 March 2023	Albuquerque	
22	22.43	Svetlana Goncharenko	Russia	22 February 1998	Liévin	
23	22.45	Felicia Brown	United States	26 February 2016	Fayetteville	
23	22.45	Tamara Clark	United States	13 March 2021	Fayetteville	
23	22.45	Jadyn Mays	United States	15 March 2025	Virginia Beach	

==== Notes ====
Below is a list of other times equal or superior to 22.45:

- Irina Privalova also ran 22.15 (1993), 22.16 (1994), 22.26 (1992), 22.32 (1995), 22.36 (1992), 22.41 (1991) and 22.45 (1991).
- Abby Steiner also ran 22.16 (2022), 22.37 (2022), 22.38 (2021), 22.41 (2021) and 22.45 (2022).
- Julien Alfred also ran 22.16 (2024), 22.26 (2023) and 22.28 A (2024).
- Favour Ofili also ran 22.20 A (2023) and 22.36 (2023)
- Merlene Ottey also twice ran 22.24 (1991), 22.34 (1989) and 22.37 (1991).
- Adaejah Hodge also ran 22.33 (2023).
- JaMeesia Ford also ran 22.34 (2025), 22.36 (2024), 22.41 (2025), 22.42 (2025) and 22.45 (2024).
- Indya Mayberry also ran 22.41 A (2025) and 22.42 (2025).
- Veronica Campbell-Brown also ran 22.43 (2004).
- Autumn Wilson also ran 22.45 A (2023).

== Olympic medalists ==
=== Men ===
Games	Gold	Silver	Bronze
1900 Paris	Walter Tewksbury; United States	Norman Pritchard; India	Stan Rowley; Australia
1904 St. Louis	Archie Hahn; United States	Nate Cartmell; United States	William Hogenson; United States
1908 London	Robert Kerr; Canada	Robert Cloughen; United States	Nate Cartmell; United States
1912 Stockholm	Ralph Craig; United States	Donald Lippincott; United States	Willie Applegarth; Great Britain
1920 Antwerp	Allen Woodring; United States	Charley Paddock; United States	Harry Edward; Great Britain
1924 Paris	Jackson Scholz; United States	Charley Paddock; United States	Eric Liddell; Great Britain
1928 Amsterdam	Percy Williams; Canada	Walter Rangeley; Great Britain	Helmut Körnig; Germany
1932 Los Angeles	Eddie Tolan; United States	George Simpson; United States	Ralph Metcalfe; United States
1936 Berlin	Jesse Owens; United States	Mack Robinson; United States	Tinus Osendarp; Netherlands
1948 London	Mel Patton; United States	Barney Ewell; United States	Lloyd LaBeach; Panama
1952 Helsinki	Andy Stanfield; United States	Thane Baker; United States	James Gathers; United States
1956 Melbourne	Bobby Morrow; United States	Andy Stanfield; United States	Thane Baker; United States
1960 Rome	Livio Berruti; Italy	Lester Carney; United States	Abdoulaye Seye; France
1964 Tokyo	Henry Carr; United States	Paul Drayton; United States	Edwin Roberts; Trinidad and Tobago
1968 Mexico City	Tommie Smith; United States	Peter Norman; Australia	John Carlos; United States
1972 Munich	Valeriy Borzov; Soviet Union	Larry Black; United States	Pietro Mennea; Italy
1976 Montreal	Don Quarrie; Jamaica	Millard Hampton; United States	Dwayne Evans; United States
1980 Moscow	Pietro Mennea; Italy	Allan Wells; Great Britain	Don Quarrie; Jamaica
1984 Los Angeles	Carl Lewis; United States	Kirk Baptiste; United States	Thomas Jefferson; United States
1988 Seoul	Joe DeLoach; United States	Carl Lewis; United States	Robson da Silva; Brazil
1992 Barcelona	Michael Marsh; United States	Frankie Fredericks; Namibia	Michael Bates; United States
1996 Atlanta	Michael Johnson; United States	Frankie Fredericks; Namibia	Ato Boldon; Trinidad and Tobago
2000 Sydney	Konstantinos Kenteris; Greece	Darren Campbell; Great Britain	Ato Boldon; Trinidad and Tobago
2004 Athens	Shawn Crawford; United States	Bernard Williams; United States	Justin Gatlin; United States
2008 Beijing	Usain Bolt; Jamaica	Shawn Crawford; United States	Walter Dix; United States
2012 London	Usain Bolt; Jamaica	Yohan Blake; Jamaica	Warren Weir; Jamaica
2016 Rio de Janeiro	Usain Bolt; Jamaica	Andre De Grasse; Canada	Christophe Lemaitre; France
2020 Tokyo	Andre De Grasse; Canada	Kenny Bednarek; United States	Noah Lyles; United States
2024 Paris	Letsile Tebogo; Botswana	Kenny Bednarek; United States	Noah Lyles; United States
2028 Los Angeles			

=== Women ===
Games	Gold	Silver	Bronze
1948 London	Fanny Blankers-Koen; Netherlands	Audrey Williamson; Great Britain	Audrey Patterson; United States
1952 Helsinki	Marjorie Jackson; Australia	Bertha Brouwer; Netherlands	Nadezhda Khnykina-Dvalishvili; Soviet Union
1956 Melbourne	Betty Cuthbert; Australia	Christa Stubnick; United Team of Germany	Marlene Mathews; Australia
1960 Rome	Wilma Rudolph; United States	Jutta Heine; United Team of Germany	Dorothy Hyman; Great Britain
1964 Tokyo	Edith McGuire; United States	Irena Kirszenstein; Poland	Marilyn Black; Australia
1968 Mexico City	Irena Szewińska; Poland	Raelene Boyle; Australia	Jenny Lamy; Australia
1972 Munich	Renate Stecher; East Germany	Raelene Boyle; Australia	Irena Szewińska; Poland
1976 Montreal	Bärbel Eckert; East Germany	Annegret Richter; West Germany	Renate Stecher; East Germany
1980 Moscow	Bärbel Wöckel; East Germany	Natalya Bochina; Soviet Union	Merlene Ottey; Jamaica
1984 Los Angeles	Valerie Brisco-Hooks; United States	Florence Griffith; United States	Merlene Ottey; Jamaica
1988 Seoul	Florence Griffith Joyner; United States	Grace Jackson; Jamaica	Heike Drechsler; East Germany
1992 Barcelona	Gwen Torrence; United States	Juliet Cuthbert; Jamaica	Merlene Ottey; Jamaica
1996 Atlanta	Marie-José Pérec; France	Merlene Ottey; Jamaica	Mary Onyali; Nigeria
2000 Sydney	Pauline Davis-Thompson; Bahamas	Susanthika Jayasinghe; Sri Lanka	Beverly McDonald; Jamaica
2004 Athens	Veronica Campbell; Jamaica	Allyson Felix; United States	Debbie Ferguson; Bahamas
2008 Beijing	Veronica Campbell-Brown; Jamaica	Allyson Felix; United States	Kerron Stewart; Jamaica
2012 London	Allyson Felix; United States	Shelly-Ann Fraser-Pryce; Jamaica	Carmelita Jeter; United States
2016 Rio de Janeiro	Elaine Thompson; Jamaica	Dafne Schippers; Netherlands	Tori Bowie; United States
2020 Tokyo	Elaine Thompson-Herah; Jamaica	Christine Mboma; Namibia	Gabby Thomas; United States
2024 Paris	Gabby Thomas; United States	Julien Alfred; Saint Lucia	Brittany Brown; United States
2028 Los Angeles			

== World Championships medalists ==
=== Men ===
Championships	Gold	Silver	Bronze
1983 Helsinki	Calvin Smith (USA)	Elliott Quow (USA)	Pietro Mennea (ITA)
1987 Rome	Calvin Smith (USA)	Gilles Quénéhervé (FRA)	John Regis (GBR)
1991 Tokyo	Michael Johnson (USA)	Frankie Fredericks (NAM)	Atlee Mahorn (CAN)
1993 Stuttgart	Frankie Fredericks (NAM)	John Regis (GBR)	Carl Lewis (USA)
1995 Gothenburg	Michael Johnson (USA)	Frankie Fredericks (NAM)	Jeff Williams (USA)
1997 Athens	Ato Boldon (TRI)	Frankie Fredericks (NAM)	Claudinei da Silva (BRA)
1999 Seville	Maurice Greene (USA)	Claudinei da Silva (BRA)	Francis Obikwelu (NGR)
2001 Edmonton	Konstantinos Kenteris (GRE)	Christopher Williams (JAM)	Kim Collins (SKN); Shawn Crawford (USA)
2003 Saint-Denis	John Capel Jr. (USA)	Darvis Patton (USA)	Shingo Suetsugu (JPN)
2005 Helsinki	Justin Gatlin (USA)	Wallace Spearmon (USA)	John Capel (USA)
2007 Osaka	Tyson Gay (USA)	Usain Bolt (JAM)	Wallace Spearmon (USA)
2009 Berlin	Usain Bolt (JAM)	Alonso Edward (PAN)	Wallace Spearmon (USA)
2011 Daegu	Usain Bolt (JAM)	Walter Dix (USA)	Christophe Lemaitre (FRA)
2013 Moscow	Usain Bolt (JAM)	Warren Weir (JAM)	Curtis Mitchell (USA)
2015 Beijing	Usain Bolt (JAM)	Justin Gatlin (USA)	Anaso Jobodwana (RSA)
2017 London	Ramil Guliyev (TUR)	Wayde van Niekerk (RSA)	Jereem Richards (TTO)
2019 Doha	Noah Lyles (USA)	Andre De Grasse (CAN)	Álex Quiñónez (ECU)
2022 Eugene	Noah Lyles (USA)	Kenny Bednarek (USA)	Erriyon Knighton (USA)
2023 Budapest	Noah Lyles (USA)	Erriyon Knighton (USA)	Letsile Tebogo (BOT)
2025 Tokyo	Noah Lyles (USA)	Kenny Bednarek (USA)	Bryan Levell (JAM)

==== Medalists by country ====
Rank	Nation	Gold	Silver	Bronze	Total
1	United States (USA)	12	8	8	28
2	Jamaica (JAM)	4	3	1	8
3	Namibia (NAM)	1	3	0	4
4	Trinidad and Tobago (TTO)	1	0	1	2
5	Greece (GRE)	1	0	0	1
5	Turkey (TUR)	1	0	0	1
6	Brazil (BRA)	0	1	1	2
6	Canada (CAN)	0	1	1	2
6	France (FRA)	0	1	1	2
6	Great Britain (GBR)	0	1	1	2
6	South Africa (RSA)	0	1	1	2
7	Panama (PAN)	0	1	0	1
8	Botswana (BOT)	0	0	1	1
8	Ecuador (ECU)	0	0	1	1
8	Italy (ITA)	0	0	1	1
8	Japan (JPN)	0	0	1	1
8	Nigeria (NGR)	0	0	1	1
8	Saint Kitts and Nevis (SKN)	0	0	1	1

=== Women ===
Championships	Gold	Silver	Bronze
1983 Helsinki	Marita Koch (GDR)	Merlene Ottey (JAM)	Kathy Smallwood-Cook (GBR)
1987 Rome	Silke Gladisch (GDR)	Florence Griffith Joyner (USA)	Merlene Ottey (JAM)
1991 Tokyo	Katrin Krabbe (GER)	Gwen Torrence (USA)	Merlene Ottey (JAM)
1993 Stuttgart	Merlene Ottey (JAM)	Gwen Torrence (USA)	Irina Privalova (RUS)
1995 Gothenburg	Merlene Ottey (JAM)	Irina Privalova (RUS)	Galina Malchugina (RUS)
1997 Athens	Zhanna Pintusevich-Block (UKR)	Susanthika Jayasinghe (SRI)	Merlene Ottey (JAM)
1999 Seville	Inger Miller (USA)	Beverly McDonald (JAM)	Merlene Frazer (JAM) Andrea Philipp (GER)
2001 Edmonton	Debbie Ferguson (BAH)	LaTasha Jenkins (USA)	Cydonie Mothersille (CAY)
2003 Saint-Denis	Anastasiya Kapachinskaya (RUS)	Torri Edwards (USA)	Muriel Hurtis (FRA)
2005 Helsinki	Allyson Felix (USA)	Rachelle Boone-Smith (USA)	Christine Arron (FRA)
2007 Osaka	Allyson Felix (USA)	Veronica Campbell (JAM)	Susanthika Jayasinghe (SRI)
2009 Berlin	Allyson Felix (USA)	Veronica Campbell-Brown (JAM)	Debbie Ferguson-McKenzie (BAH)
2011 Daegu	Veronica Campbell-Brown (JAM)	Carmelita Jeter (USA)	Allyson Felix (USA)
2013 Moscow	Shelly-Ann Fraser-Pryce (JAM)	Murielle Ahouré (CIV)	Blessing Okagbare (NGR)
2015 Beijing	Dafne Schippers (NED)	Elaine Thompson-Herah (JAM)	Veronica Campbell-Brown (JAM)
2017 London	Dafne Schippers (NED)	Marie Josée Ta Lou (CIV)	Shaunae Miller-Uibo (BAH)
2019 Doha	Dina Asher-Smith (GBR)	Brittany Brown (USA)	Mujinga Kambundji (SUI)
2022 Eugene	Shericka Jackson (JAM)	Shelly-Ann Fraser-Pryce (JAM)	Dina Asher-Smith (GBR)
2023 Budapest	Shericka Jackson (JAM)	Gabby Thomas (USA)	Sha'Carri Richardson (USA)
2025 Tokyo	Melissa Jefferson-Wooden (USA)	Amy Hunt (GBR)	Shericka Jackson (JAM)

==== Medalists by country ====
Rank	Nation	Gold	Silver	Bronze	Total
1	Jamaica (JAM)	6	6	6	18
2	United States (USA)	5	9	2	16
3	East Germany (GDR)	2	0	0	2
3	Netherlands (NED)	2	0	0	2
5	Russia (RUS)	1	1	2	4
5	Great Britain (GBR)	1	1	2	4
7	Bahamas (BAH)	1	0	2	3
8	Germany (GER)	1	0	1	2
9	Ukraine (UKR)	1	0	0	1
10	Ivory Coast (CIV)	0	2	0	2
11	Sri Lanka (SRI)	0	1	1	2
12	France (FRA)	0	0	2	2
13	Cayman Islands (CAY)	0	0	1	1
13	Switzerland (SUI)	0	0	1	1
13	Nigeria (NGR)	0	0	1	1

== World Indoor Championships medalists ==
=== Men ===
Games	Gold	Silver	Bronze
1985 Paris^{[A]}	Aleksandr Yevgenyev (URS)	Ade Mafe (GBR)	João Batista da Silva (BRA)
1987 Indianapolis	Kirk Baptiste (USA)	Bruno Marie-Rose (FRA)	Robson da Silva (BRA)
1989 Budapest	John Regis (GBR)	Ade Mafe (GBR)	Kevin Little (USA)
1991 Seville	Nikolay Antonov (BUL)	Linford Christie (GBR)	Ade Mafe (GBR)
1993 Toronto	James Trapp (USA)	Damien Marsh (AUS)	Kevin Little (USA)
1995 Barcelona	Geir Moen (NOR)	Troy Douglas (BER)	Sebastián Keitel (CHI)
1997 Paris	Kevin Little (USA)	Iván García (CUB)	Francis Obikwelu (NGR)
1999 Maebashi	Frankie Fredericks (NAM)	Obadele Thompson (BAR)	Kevin Little (USA)
2001 Lisbon	Shawn Crawford (USA)	Christian Malcolm (GBR)	Patrick van Balkom (NED)
2003 Birmingham	Marlon Devonish (GBR)	Joseph Batangdon (CMR)	Dominic Demeritte (BAH)
2004 Budapest	Dominic Demeritte (BAH)	Johan Wissman (SWE)	Tobias Unger (GER)

=== Women ===
Games	Gold	Silver	Bronze
1985 Paris^{[A]}	Marita Koch (GDR)	Marie-Christine Cazier (FRA)	Kim Robertson (NZL)
1987 Indianapolis	Heike Drechsler (GDR)	Merlene Ottey-Page (JAM)	Grace Jackson (JAM)
1989 Budapest	Merlene Ottey (JAM)	Grace Jackson (JAM)	Natalya Kovtun (URS)
1991 Seville	Merlene Ottey (JAM)	Irina Sergeyeva (URS)	Grit Breuer (GER)
1993 Toronto	Irina Privalova (RUS)	Melinda Gainsford (AUS)	Natalya Voronova (RUS)
1995 Barcelona	Melinda Gainsford (AUS)	Pauline Davis (BAH)	Natalya Voronova (RUS)
1997 Paris	Ekaterini Koffa (GRE)	Juliet Cuthbert (JAM)	Svetlana Goncharenko (RUS)
1999 Maebashi	Ionela Târlea (ROU)	Svetlana Goncharenko (RUS)	Pauline Davis (BAH)
2001 Lisbon	Juliet Campbell (JAM)	LaTasha Jenkins (USA)	Natalya Vinogradova-Safronnikova (BLR)
2003 Birmingham	Muriel Hurtis-Houairi (FRA)	Anastasiya Kapachinskaya (RUS)	Juliet Campbell (JAM)
2004 Budapest	Natallia Safronnikava (BLR)	Svetlana Goncharenko (RUS)	Karin Mayr-Krifka (AUT)

- ^{^{A}} Known as the World Indoor Games

== World leading times ==
=== Men ===
Year	Time	Wind	Athlete	Date	Place
1966	20.14 yh	+0.1	Tommie Smith (USA)	11 June	Sacramento
1967	20.14 Ay	+0.9	Tommie Smith (USA)	17 June	Provo
1968	19.83 A	+0.9	Tommie Smith (USA)	16 October	Mexico City
1969	20.24 Ay	+0.4	John Carlos (USA)	12 September	South Lake Tahoe
1970	20.42 yh	+0.3	John Carlos (USA)	17 March	Melbourne
1971	19.86 A	+1.0	Donald Quarrie (JAM)	3 August	Cali
1972	20.00	±0.0	Valeriy Borzov (URS)	4 September	Munich
1973	20.33 y	±0.0	Steve Williams (USA)	16 June	Bakersfield
1974	20.06	+0.4	Donald Quarrie (JAM)	16 August	Zürich
1975	20.04 h	+1.3	Donald Quarrie (JAM)	7 June	Eugene
1976	20.10	+1.7	Millard Hampton (USA)	22 June	Eugene
1977	20.08 A	+0.1	Silvio Leonard (CUB)	12 August	Guadalajara
1978	20.03	+1.6	Clancy Edwards (USA)	29 April	Westwood
1979	19.72 A	+1.8	Pietro Mennea (ITA)	12 September	Mexico City
1980	19.96	±0.0	Pietro Mennea (ITA)	17 August	Barletta
1981	20.20	+1.4	James Sanford (USA)	10 May	Westwood
1982	20.15 A	+0.3	Mike Miller (USA)	2 June	Provo
1983	19.75	+1.5	Carl Lewis (USA)	19 June	Indianapolis
1984	19.80	−0.9	Carl Lewis (USA)	8 August	Los Angeles
1985	20.07	+1.5	Lorenzo Daniel (USA)	18 May	Starkville
1986	20.12	+0.6	Floyd Heard (USA)	7 July	Moscow
1987	19.92	+1.3	Carl Lewis (USA)	4 May	Madrid
1988	19.75	+1.7	Joe DeLoach (USA)	28 August	Seoul
1989	19.96	+0.4	Robson da Silva (BRA)	25 August	Brussels
1990	19.85	+0.4	Michael Johnson (USA)	6 July	Edinburgh
1991	19.88	−0.9	Michael Johnson (USA)	20 September	Barcelona
1992	19.73	−0.2	Michael Marsh (USA)	5 August	Barcelona
1993	19.85	+0.3	Frankie Fredericks (NAM)	20 August	Stuttgart
1994	19.87 A	+1.8	John Regis (GBR)	31 July	Sestriere
1995	19.79	+0.5	Michael Johnson (USA)	11 August	Gothenburg
1996	19.32	+0.4	Michael Johnson (USA)	1 August	Atlanta
1997	19.77	+0.7	Ato Boldon (TRI)	13 July	Stuttgart
1998	19.88	−0.4	Ato Boldon (TRI)	17 June	Athens
1999	19.84	+1.7	Francis Obikwelu (NGR)	25 August	Seville
2000	19.71 A	+1.8	Michael Johnson (USA)	18 March	Pietersburg
2001	19.88	+0.1	Joshua J. Johnson (USA)	24 August	Brussels
2002	19.85 A	±0.0	Shawn Crawford (USA)	12 April	Pretoria
2002	19.85	−0.5	Konstadínos Kedéris (GRE)	9 August	Munich
2003	20.01	+0.3	Bernard Williams (USA)	11 July	Rome
2004	19.79	+1.2	Shawn Crawford (USA)	26 August	Athens
2005	19.89	+1.8	Wallace Spearmon (USA)	22 July	London
2006	19.63	+0.4	Xavier Carter (USA)	11 July	Lausanne
2007	19.62	−0.3	Tyson Gay (USA)	24 June	Indianapolis
2008	19.30	−0.9	Usain Bolt (JAM)	20 August	Beijing
2009	19.19	−0.3	Usain Bolt (JAM)	20 August	Berlin
2010	19.56	−0.8	Usain Bolt (JAM)	1 May	Kingston
2011	19.26	+0.7	Yohan Blake (JAM)	16 September	Brussels
2012	19.32	+0.4	Usain Bolt (JAM)	9 August	London
2013	19.66	±0.0	Usain Bolt (JAM)	17 August	Moscow
2014	19.68	−0.5	Justin Gatlin (USA)	18 July	Monaco
2015	19.55	−0.1	Usain Bolt (JAM)	27 August	Beijing
2016	19.74	+1.4	LaShawn Merritt (USA)	8 July	Eugene
2017	19.77	±0.0	Isaac Makwala (BOT)	14 July	Madrid
2018	19.65	+0.9	Noah Lyles (USA)	20 July	Monaco
2019	19.50	−0.1	Noah Lyles (USA)	5 July	Lausanne
2020	19.76	+0.7	Noah Lyles (USA)	14 August	Monaco
2021	19.52	+1.5	Noah Lyles (USA)	21 August	Eugene
2022	19.31	+0.4	Noah Lyles (USA)	21 July	Eugene
2023	19.47	+1.6	Noah Lyles (USA)	23 July	London
2024	19.46	+0.4	Letsile Tebogo (BOT)	8 August	Saint-Denis
2025	19.51	+1.0	Noah Lyles (USA)	18 September	Tokyo
2026	19.52	−0.1	Kenny Bednarek (USA)	13 September	Budapest

=== Women ===
Year	Time	Wind	Athlete	Date	Place
1968	22.58 A	+2.0	Irena Szewinska (POL)	18 October	Mexico City
1970	22.62	+0.8	Chi Cheng (ROC)	12 July	Munich
1971	22.70	±0.0	Renate Stecher (GDR)	13 August	Helsinki
1972	22.40	+1.1	Renate Stecher (GDR)	7 September	Munich
1973	22.38	+1.6	Renate Stecher (GDR)	21 July	Dresden
1974	22.21	+1.9	Irena Szewinska (POL)	13 June	Potsdam
1975	22.44	NWI	Renate Stecher (GDR)	10 August	Potsdam
1976	22.37	±0.0	Bärbel Wöckel (GDR)	24 August	Zürich
1977	22.37	+0.8	Irena Szewinska (POL)	24 August	Zürich
1978	22.06	+1.2	Marita Koch (GDR)	28 May	Erfurt
1979	21.71	+0.7	Marita Koch (GDR)	6 June	Karl-Marx-Stadt
1980	22.01	+0.6	Bärbel Wöckel (GDR)	18 July	Cottbus
1981	21.84	−1.1	Evelyn Ashford (USA)	28 August	Brussels
1982	21.76	+0.3	Marita Koch (GDR)	3 July	Dresden
1983	21.82	+1.3	Marita Koch (GDR)	18 June	Karl-Marx-Stadt
1984	21.71	+0.3	Marita Koch (GDR)	21 July	Potsdam
1985	21.78	−1.3	Marita Koch (GDR)	11 August	Leipzig
1986	21.71	+1.2	Heike Drechsler (GDR)	29 June	Jena
1986	21.71	−0.8	Heike Drechsler (GDR)	29 August	Stuttgart
1987	21.74	+1.3	Silke Gladisch (GDR)	3 September	Rome
1988	21.34	+1.3	Florence Griffith Joyner (USA)	29 August	Seoul
1989	22.04 A	+0.7	Dawn Sowell (USA)	2 June	Provo
1990	21.66	−1.0	Merlene Ottey (JAM)	15 August	Zürich
1991	21.64	+0.8	Merlene Ottey (JAM)	13 September	Brussels
1992	21.72	−0.1	Gwen Torrence (USA)	5 August	Barcelona
1993	21.77	+1.0	Merlene Ottey (JAM)	7 August	Monaco
1994	21.85	−0.8	Gwen Torrence (USA)	12 August	Durham
1995	21.77	−0.3	Gwen Torrence (USA)	18 August	Cologne
1996	22.07	+0.4	Marie-José Pérec (FRA)	1 August	Atlanta
1996	22.07	−0.1	Mary Onyali (NGR)	14 August	Zürich
1997	21.76	−0.8	Marion Jones (USA)	13 August	Zürich
1998	21.62 A	−0.6	Marion Jones (USA)	11 September	Johannesburg
1999	21.77	+0.6	Inger Miller (USA)	27 August	Seville
2000	21.94	+1.8	Marion Jones (USA)	23 July	Sacramento
2001	22.39	+1.8	LaTasha Jenkins (USA)	23 June	Eugene
2001	22.39	−0.3	Debbie Ferguson (BAH)	9 August	Edmonton
2002	22.20	±0.0	Dbbie Ferguson (BAH)	29 July	Manchester
2003	22.11 A	−0.5	Allyson Felix (USA)	3 May	Mexico City
2004	22.05	+0.8	Veronica Campbell-Brown (JAM)	25 August	Athens
2005	22.13	+0.3	Allyson Felix (USA)	26 June	Carson
2006	22.00	+1.3	Sherone Simpson (JAM)	25 June	Kingston
2006	22.00	−0.3	Sherone Simpson (JAM)	25 July	Stockholm
2007	21.81	+1.7	Allyson Felix (USA)	31 August	Osaka
2008	21.74	+0.6	Veronica Campbell-Brown (JAM)	21 August	Beijing
2009	21.88	+1.3	Allyson Felix (USA)	31 July	Stockholm
2010	21.98	+1.4	Veronica Campbell-Brown (JAM)	12 June	New York City
2011	22.15	+1.0	Shalonda Solomon (USA)	26 June	Eugene
2012	21.69	+1.0	Allyson Felix (USA)	30 June	Eugene
2013	22.13	+1.0	Shelly-Ann Fraser-Pryce (JAM)	23 June	Kingston
2014	22.02	+0.1	Allyson Felix (USA)	5 September	Brussels
2015	21.63	+0.2	Dafne Schippers (NED)	28 August	Beijing
2016	21.78	−0.1	Elaine Thompson (JAM)	17 August	Rio de Janeiro
2017	21.77	+1.5	Tori Bowie (USA)	27 May	Eugene
2018	21.89	+0.2	Dina Asher-Smith (GBR)	11 August	Berlin
2019	21.74	−0.4	Shaunae Miller-Uibo (BAH)	29 August	Zürich
2020	21.98	+2.0	Shaunae Miller-Uibo (BAH)	25 July	Clermont
2021	21.53	+0.8	Elaine Thompson-Herah (JAM)	3 August	Tokyo
2022	21.45	+0.6	Shericka Jackson (JAM)	21 July	Eugene
2023	21.41	+0.1	Shericka Jackson (JAM)	25 August	Budapest
2024	21.78	+0.6	Gabby Thomas (USA)	22 June	Eugene
2025	21.68	−0.1	Melissa Jefferson-Wooden (USA)	19 September	Tokyo
2026	21.47	−0.6	Melissa Jefferson-Wooden (USA)	13 September	Budapest

== See also ==
- National records in the 200 metres
- List of 200 metres national champions (men)
