= 2006 in the sport of athletics =

2006 in athletics
- Major world events: World Championships; World Indoor Championships
- IAAF Athletes of the Year: Asafa Powell; Sanya Richards

The following events in the sport of athletics took place in 2006:

== Championships ==
- March: 2006 IAAF World Indoor Championships (part of the IAAF World Athletics Series)
- March: 2006 Commonwealth Games
- April: 2006 IAAF World Cross Country Championships (part of the IAAF World Athletics Series)
- May: 2006 IAAF World Race Walking Cup (part of the IAAF World Athletics Series)
- July: 2006 Central American and Caribbean Games
- August: 2006 European Championships in Athletics
- August: 2006 African Championships in Athletics
- August: 2006 World Junior Championships in Athletics (part of the IAAF World Athletics Series)
- September: 2006 IAAF World Athletics Final (part of the IAAF World Athletics Series)
- September: 2006 IAAF World Cup (part of the IAAF World Athletics Series)
- October: 2006 Lusophony Games
- October: 2006 IAAF World Road Running Championships (part of the IAAF World Athletics Series)

=== World Athletics Tour ===
The World Athletics Tour is a tournament where athletes accumulate points from placing in designated meets throughout the season. The top-ranking athletes in each event are then allowed entry in the IAAF World Athletics Final.

In 2006 the World Athletics Tour consisted of six IAAF Golden League meets (Oslo, Paris, Rome, Zürich, Brussels, Berlin), six Super Grand Prix meets (Doha, Athens, Lausanne, Stockholm, London (Crystal Palace), Monaco), twelve Grand Prix meets (Melbourne, Dakar, Osaka, Belém, Eugene, Hengelo, Ostrava, Gateshead, Madrid, Helsinki, Rieti, Zagreb) as well as 26 Area Permit Meetings all over the world. The World Athletics Final was held in Stuttgart, having been staged in Monaco the three previous years.

=== Challenges ===
In certain events that are not included in the World Athletics Final, currently race walking and combined events (formerly also cross-country running), distinct tournaments, named challenges, are being held. Similarly to the World Athletics Tour, the participating athletes accumulate points in designated meets, however in this case the final ranking is decided by the points table and not a conclusive meet.

See IAAF World Race Walking Challenge and IAAF World Combined Events Challenge for the 2006 results.

== World records ==
=== Senior ===
==== Outdoor ====
Event		Record	Athlete	Nationality	Date	Place
100 m	Men	9.77 s	Asafa Powell	Jamaica	June 11, 2006	Gateshead, United Kingdom
100 m	Men	9.77 s	Asafa Powell	Jamaica	August 18, 2006	Zürich, Switzerland
100 m	Men	9.77 (Note: Ratified as a record but later nullified due to Gatlin's failed drug test)	Justin Gatlin	USA	May 12, 2006	Doha, Qatar
5000 m	Women	14:24.53	Meseret Defar	Ethiopia	June 3, 2006	New York City, USA
15 km (road)	Women	46:55+	Kayoko Fukushi	Japan	February 5, 2006	Marugame, Japan
20 km (road)	Men	55:48+	Haile Gebrselassie	Ethiopia	January 15, 2006	Phoenix, United States
20 km (road)	Women	1:03:21	Lornah Kiplagat	Netherlands	October 8, 2006	Debrecen, Hungary
Half marathon	Men	58:55	Haile Gebrselassie	Ethiopia	January 15, 2006	Phoenix, United States
110 m hurdles	Men	12.88 s	Liu Xiang	China	July 11, 2006	Lausanne, Switzerland
50 km walk (road)	Men	3:35:47	Nathan Deakes	Australia	December 6, 2006	Geelong, Australia
4 × 800 m relay	Men	7:02.43	Joseph Mutua, William Yiampoy, Ismael Kombich, Wilfred Bungei	Kenya	August 25, 2006	Brussels, Belgium
Hammer throw	Women	77.26	Gulfiya Khanafeyeva	Russia	June 12, 2006	Tula, Russia
Hammer throw	Women	77.41	Tatyana Lysenko	Russia	June 24, 2006	Zhukovsky, Russia
Hammer throw	Women	77.80	Tatyana Lysenko	Russia	August 15, 2006	Tallinn, Estonia
NOT RATIFIED:
10 km (road)	Men	26:54 (Note: Not ratified due to excessive downhill slope)	Eliud Kipchoge	Kenya	December 31, 2006	Madrid, Spain
10 km (road)	Men	26:54	Zersenay Tadese	Eritrea	December 31, 2006	Madrid, Spain
25 km (road)	Men	1:11:37 (Note: Not ratified due to inadequate drug testing)	Haile Gebrselassie	Ethiopia	March 12, 2006	Alphen aan den Rijn, Netherlands
25 km (road)	Women	1:21:31+	Constantina Tomescu	Romania	October 22, 2006	Chicago, United States
30 km (road)	Women	1:38:30+	Constantina Tomescu	Romania	October 22, 2006	Chicago, United States

==== Indoor ====
Event		Record	Athlete	Nationality	Date	Place
1500 m	Women	3:58.28	Yelena Soboleva	Russia	February 18, 2006	Moscow, Russia
3000 m	Women	8:27.86	Liliya Shobukhova	Russia	February 17, 2006	Moscow, Russia
High jump	Women	2.08 m	Kajsa Bergqvist	Sweden	February 4, 2006	Arnstadt, Germany
Pole vault	Women	4.91 m	Yelena Isinbayeva	Russia	February 12, 2006	Donetsk, Ukraine
4 × 400 m relay	Women	3:23.37	Yuliya Gushchina, Olga Kotlyarova, Olga Zaytseva, Olesya Krasnomovets	Russia	January 28, 2006	Glasgow, United Kingdom
NOT RATIFIED:
4 × 400 m relay	Men	3:01.96	Kerron Clement, Wallace Spearmon, Darold Williamson, Jeremy Wariner	United States	February 11, 2006	Fayetteville, United States

=== Junior ===
==== Outdoor ====
Event		Record	Athlete	Nationality	Date	Place
4 × 100 m relay	Women	43.29	Bianca Knight, Jeneba Tarmoh, Elizabeth Olear, Gabrielle Mayo	USA	August 8, 2006	Eugene, United States
Discus throw	Men	66.35	Margus Hunt	Estonia	August 15, 2006	Beijing, China
Discus throw	Men	66.68	Margus Hunt	Estonia	August 16, 2006	Beijing, China
Discus throw	Men	67.32	Margus Hunt	Estonia	August 16, 2006	Beijing, China
Hammer throw	Men	82.62	Yevgeniy Aydamirov	Russia	July 22, 2006	Tula, Russia
NOT RATIFIED:
10 km walk	Men	39:45	Sergey Morozov	Russia	February 19, 2006	Adler, Russia
10 km walk	Men	39:00	Chu Yafei	China	October 21, 2006	Xi'an, China

== Awards ==
=== Men ===
2006 TRACK & FIELD AWARDS	WINNER
IAAF World Athlete of the Year	Asafa Powell (JAM)
Track & Field Athlete of the Year	Asafa Powell (JAM)
European Athlete of the Year Award	Francis Obikwelu (POR)
Best Male Track Athlete ESPY Award	Justin Gatlin (USA)

=== Women ===
2006 TRACK & FIELD AWARDS	WINNER
IAAF World Athlete of the Year	Sanya Richards (USA)
Track & Field Athlete of the Year	Sanya Richards (USA)
European Athlete of the Year Award	Carolina Klüft (SWE)
Best Female Track Athlete ESPY Award	Allyson Felix (USA)

== Awards ==
At the 2006 World Athletics Gala in Monaco Asafa Powell and Sanya Richards were given the IAAF World Athlete of the Year awards for men and women respectively.

At the same time Liu Xiang and Meseret Defar were recognized with the Performance of the Year awards for men and women, for their new world records (see above). The Rising Star Award was given to Margus Hunt for his world junior records, and the Coaches’ Award was given to Woldemeskel Kostre of Ethiopia. Hicham El Guerrouj, Stefka Kostadinova and Jan Železný were presented Distinguished Career Awards.

== Transfers of eligibility ==
See list of eligibility transfers in athletics

== Men's Best Year Performances ==
=== 100 metres ===
RANK	2006 WORLD BEST PERFORMERS	TIME
1.	Asafa Powell (JAM)	9.77
2.	Tyson Gay (USA)	9.84
3.	Olusoji Fasuba (NGR)	9.85
4.	Leonard Scott (USA)	9.91
5.	Francis Obikwelu (PRT)	9.99

=== 200 metres ===
RANK	2006 WORLD BEST PERFORMERS	TIME
1.	Xavier Carter (USA)	19.63
2.	Wallace Spearmon (USA)	19.65
3.	Tyson Gay (USA)	19.68
4.	Usain Bolt (JAM)	19.88
5.	Asafa Powell (JAM)	19.90

=== 400 metres ===
RANK	2006 WORLD BEST PERFORMERS	TIME
1.	Jeremy Wariner (USA)	43.62
2.	Gary Kikaya (COD)	44.10
3.	LaShawn Merritt (USA)	44.14
4.	Andrew Rock (USA)	44.45
5.	Xavier Carter (USA)	44.53

=== 800 metres ===
RANK	2006 WORLD BEST PERFORMERS	TIME
1.	Mbulaeni Mulaudzi (RSA)	1:43.09
2.	Amine Laâlou (MAR)	1:43.25
3.	Wilfred Bungei (KEN)	1:43.31
4.	Yuriy Borzakovskiy (RUS)	1:43.42
5.	Bram Som (NED)	1:43.45

=== 1500 metres ===
RANK	2006 WORLD BEST PERFORMERS	TIME
1.	Daniel Kipchirchir Komen (KEN)	3:29.02
2.	Rachid Ramzi (BHR)	3:29.14
3.	Bernard Lagat (USA)	3:29.68
4.	Ivan Heshko (UKR)	3:31.08
5.	Adil Kaouch (MAR)	3:31.10

=== Mile ===
RANK	2006 WORLD BEST PERFORMERS	TIME
1.	Alex Kipchirchir (KEN)	3:50.32
2.	Ivan Heshko (UKR)	3:50.89
3.	Bernard Lagat (USA)	3:51.53
4.	Rachid Ramzi (BHR)	3:52.39
5.	Daniel Kipchirchir Komen (KEN)	3:52.41

=== 3000 metres ===
RANK	2006 WORLD BEST PERFORMERS	TIME
1.	Isaac Kiprono Songok (KEN)	7:28.72
2.	Tariku Bekele (ETH)	7:29.11
3.	Augustine Choge (KEN)	7:29.74
4.	Eliud Kipchoge (KEN)	7:30.48
5.	Boniface Songok (KEN)	7:31.33

=== 5000 metres ===
RANK	2006 WORLD BEST PERFORMERS	TIME
1.	Kenenisa Bekele (ETH)	12:48.09
2.	Isaac Kiprono Songok (KEN)	12:48.66
3.	Saif Saeed Shaheen (QAT)	12:51.98
4.	Edwin Cheruiyot (KEN)	12:52.40
5.	Tariku Bekele (ETH)	12:53.81

=== 10,000 metres ===
RANK	2006 WORLD BEST PERFORMERS	TIME
1.	Micah Kogo (KEN)	26:35.63
2.	Zersenay Tadese (ERI)	26:37.25
3.	Boniface Kiprop Toroitich (UGA)	26:41.95
4.	Ibrahim Jeylan (ETH)	27:02.81
5.	Moses Ndiema Masai (KEN)	27:03.20

=== 110 m Hurdles ===
RANK	2006 WORLD BEST PERFORMERS	TIME
1.	Liu Xiang (CHN)	12.88
2.	Dominique Arnold (USA)	12.90
3.	Allen Johnson (USA)	12.96
4.	Dayron Robles (CUB)	13.00
5.	Terrence Trammell (USA)	13.02

=== 400 m Hurdles ===
RANK	2006 WORLD BEST PERFORMERS	TIME
1.	Kerron Clement (USA)	47.39
2.	Bershawn Jackson (USA)	47.48
3.	Periklís Iakovákis (GRE)	47.82
4.	Kenji Narisako (JPN)	47.93
5.	Louis van Zyl (RSA)	48.05

=== 3000 m Steeplechase ===
RANK	2006 WORLD BEST PERFORMERS	TIME
1.	Saif Saeed Shaheen (QAT)	7:56.32
2.	Paul Kipsiele Koech (KEN)	7:59.94
3.	Richard Matelong (KEN)	8:07.50
4.	Brimin Kipruto (KEN)	8:08.32
5.	Abdelkader Hachlaf (MAR)	8:08.78

=== Pole Vault ===
RANK	2006 WORLD BEST PERFORMERS	HEIGHT
1.	Brad Walker (USA)	6.00 m
2.	Steven Hooker (AUS)	5.96 m
3.	Paul Burgess (AUS)	5.92 m
4.	Tim Lobinger (GER)	5.90 m
5.	Danny Ecker (GER)	5.86 m

== Women's Best Year Performances ==
=== 100 metres ===
RANK	2006 WORLD BEST PERFORMERS	TIME
1.	Sherone Simpson (JAM)	10.82
2.	Veronica Campbell (JAM)	10.99
3.	Kerron Stewart (JAM)	11.03
3.	Me'Lisa Barber (USA)	11.03
3.	LaTasha Jenkins (USA)	11.03

=== 200 metres ===
RANK	2006 WORLD BEST PERFORMERS	TIME
1.	Sherone Simpson (JAM)	22.00
2.	Allyson Felix (USA)	22.11
3.	Sanya Richards (USA)	22.17
4.	Kim Gevaert (BEL)	22.20
5.	Carol Rodriguez (PUR)	22.23

=== Half Marathon ===
RANK	2006 WORLD BEST PERFORMERS	TIME
1.	Edith Masai (KEN)	1:07:16
2.	Kayoko Fukushi (JPN)	1:07:26
3.	Deena Kastor (USA)	1:07:34
4.	Mizuki Noguchi (JPN)	1:07:43
5.	Constantina Tomescu (ROU)	1:08:07

=== 100 m Hurdles ===
RANK	2006 WORLD BEST PERFORMERS	TIME
1.	Michelle Perry (USA)	12.43
2.	Damu Cherry (USA)	12.44
3.	Ginnie Powell (USA)	12.48
4.	Brigitte Foster-Hylton (JAM)	12.49
5.	Susanna Kallur (SWE)	12.52

=== 400 m Hurdles ===
RANK	2006 WORLD BEST PERFORMERS	TIME
1.	Lashinda Demus (USA)	53.02
2.	Yuliya Pechonkina (RUS)	53.14
3.	Faní Halkiá (GRE)	53.71
4.	Tiffany Williams (USA)	53.79
5.	Jana Rawlinson (AUS)	53.82

=== 3000 m Steeplechase ===
RANK	2006 WORLD BEST PERFORMERS	TIME
1.	Wioletta Janowska (POL)	9:17.15
2.	Dorcus Inzikuru (UGA)	9:19.51
3.	Alesya Turova (BLR)	9:20.16
4.	Lyubov Ivanova (RUS)	9:21.94
5.	Tatyana Petrova (RUS)	9:22.82

=== High Jump ===
RANK	2006 WORLD BEST PERFORMERS	HEIGHT
1.	Kajsa Bergqvist (SWE)	2.05 m
2.	Venelina Veneva (BUL)	2.04 m
3.	Blanka Vlašić (CRO)	2.03 m
3.	Tia Hellebaut (BEL)	2.03 m
5.	Chaunte Howard (USA)	2.01 m

=== Pole Vault ===
RANK	2006 WORLD BEST PERFORMERS	HEIGHT
1.	Yelena Isinbayeva (RUS)	4.91 m
2.	Monika Pyrek (POL)	4.75 m
3.	Anna Rogowska (POL)	4.70 m
3.	Svetlana Feofanova (RUS)	4.70 m
3.	Vanessa Boslak (FRA)	4.70 m

=== Heptathlon ===
RANK	2006 WORLD BEST PERFORMERS	POINTS
1.	Carolina Klüft (SWE)	6740
2.	Yuliya Ignatkina (RUS)	6463
3.	Lyudmila Blonska (UKR)	6448
4.	Karin Ruckstuhl (NED)	6423
5.	Lilli Schwarzkopf (GER)	6420

=== Marathon ===
==== Men's competition ====
===== Commonwealth Games =====
RANK	ATHLETE	TIME
	Samson Ramadhani (TAN)	2:11:29
	Fred Tumbo (KEN)	2:12:03
	Dan Robinson (ENG)	2:14:50
4.	Scott Westcott (AUS)	2:16:32
5.	Andrew Letherby (AUS)	2:17:10
6.	Jacob Yator (KEN)	2:17:31
7.	Shane Nankervis (AUS)	2:19:15
8.	Francis Naali (TAN)	2:19:39
9.	Lebenya Nkoka (LES)	2:19:40
10.	Teboho Sello (LES)	2:19:57

===== European championships =====
RANK	ATHLETE	TIME
	Stefano Baldini (ITA)	2:11:32
	Viktor Röthlin (SUI)	2:11:50
	Julio Rey (ESP)	2:12:37
4.	Luc Krotwaar (NED)	2:12:44
5.	Francesco Ingargiola (ITA)	2:13:04
6.	Dmitriy Semyonov (RUS)	2:13:09
7.	Janne Holmén (FIN)	2:13:10
8.	Alberto Chaíça (POR)	2:13:14
9.	Kamiel Maase (NED)	2:13:46
10.	Luís Jesus (POR)	2:14:15

===== Asian Games =====
RANK	ATHLETE	TIME
	Mubarak Hassan Shami (QAT)	2:12:44
	Khalid Kamal Yaseen (BHR)	2:15:36
	Satoshi Osaki (JPN)	2:15:36
4.	Satoshi Irifune (JPN)	2:17:24
5.	Ahmed Jumah Jaber (QAT)	2:17:43
6.	Wei Su (CHN)	2:18:55
7.	Ji Young-Jun (KOR)	2:19:35
8.	Ri Kum-Song (PRK)	2:20:19
9.	Ri Kyong-Chol (PRK)	2:23:46
10.	Chia Chang (TPE)	2:23:50

===== Best Year Performances =====
RANK	ATHLETE	TIME	EVENT
1.	Haile Gebrselassie (ETH)	2:05:56	Berlin Marathon
2.	Sammy Korir (KEN)	2:06:37	Rotterdam Marathon
3.	Felix Limo (KEN)	2:06:39	London Marathon
4.	Martin Lel (KEN)	2:06:41	London Marathon
5.	Paul Kirui (KEN)	2:06:43	Rotterdam Marathon
6.	Charles Kibiwott (KEN)	2:06:51	London Marathon
7.	Julio Rey (ESP)	2:06:52	Hamburg Marathon
—	Haile Gebrselassie (ETH)	2:06:52	Fukuoka Marathon
9.	Hendrick Ramaala (RSA)	2:06:55	London Marathon
10.	Khalid Khannouchi (USA)	2:07:04	London Marathon

==== Women's competition ====
===== Commonwealth Games =====
RANK	ATHLETE	TIME
	Kerryn McCann (AUS)	2:30:54
	Hellen Cherono Koskei (KEN)	2:30:56
	Elizabeth Yelling (ENG)	2:32:19
4.	Tracey Morris (WAL)	2:33:13
5.	Josephine Deemay (TAN)	2:36:27
6.	Lioudmila Kortchaguina (CAN)	2:36:43
7.	Kate Smythe (AUS)	2:38:31
8.	Lauren Shelley (AUS)	2:39:13
9.	Hayley Haining (SCO)	2:39:39
10.	Susan Partridge (SCO)	2:39:54

===== European championships =====
RANK	ATHLETE	TIME
	Ulrike Maisch (GER)	2:30:01
	Olivera Jevtić (SER)	2:30:27
	Irina Permitina (RUS)	2:30:53
4.	Zivile Balciunaite (LTU)	2:31:01
5.	Bruna Genovese (ITA)	2:31:15
6.	Alevtina Biktimirova (RUS)	2:31:23
7.	Deborah Toniolo (ITA)	2:31:31
8.	Giovanna Volpato (ITA)	2:32:04
9.	Anna Incerti (ITA)	2:32:53
10.	Anália Rosa (POR)	2:32:56

===== Asian Games =====
RANK	ATHLETE	TIME
	Zhou Chunxiu (CHN)	2:27:03
	Kiyoko Shimahara (JPN)	2:30:34
	Kayako Obata (JPN)	2:30:38
4.	Jo Pun-Hui (PRK)	2:42:34
5.	Choi Kyong-Hee (KOR)	2:44:20
6.	Jong Yong-Ok (PRK)	2:48:49
7.	Kim Eun-jung (KOR)	2:54:33
8.	Otgonbayar Luvsanlkhundeg (MGL)	2:59:55
9.	Wang Ci (CHN)	3:08:10
—	Maria Pia Nehme (LIB)	DNF

===== Best Year Performances =====
RANK	ATHLETE	TIME	EVENT
1.	Deena Kastor (USA)	2:19:36	London Marathon
2.	Zhou Chunxiu (CHN)	2:19:51	Seoul International Marathon
3.	Berhane Adere (ETH)	2:20:42	Chicago Marathon
4.	Galina Bogomolova (RUS)	2:20:47	Chicago Marathon
5.	Lyudmila Petrova (RUS)	2:21:29	London Marathon
6.	Getenesh Wami (ETH)	2:21:34	Berlin Marathon
7.	Susan Chepkemei (KEN)	2:21:46	Chicago Marathon
8.	Berhane Adere (ETH)	2:21:52	London Marathon
9.	Galina Bogomolova (RUS)	2:21:58	London Marathon
10.	Benita Johnson (AUS)	2:22:36	Chicago Marathon

== Deaths ==
- March 9 – Erik Elmsäter (86), Swedish long-distance runner (b. 1919)
- August 9 – Chinatsu Mori (26), Japanese shot putter (b. 1980)
