= World Athletics Awards =

Annual award administered by World Athletics

- Presented by: World Athletics
- First award: 1988
- Website: https://worldathletics.org/awards

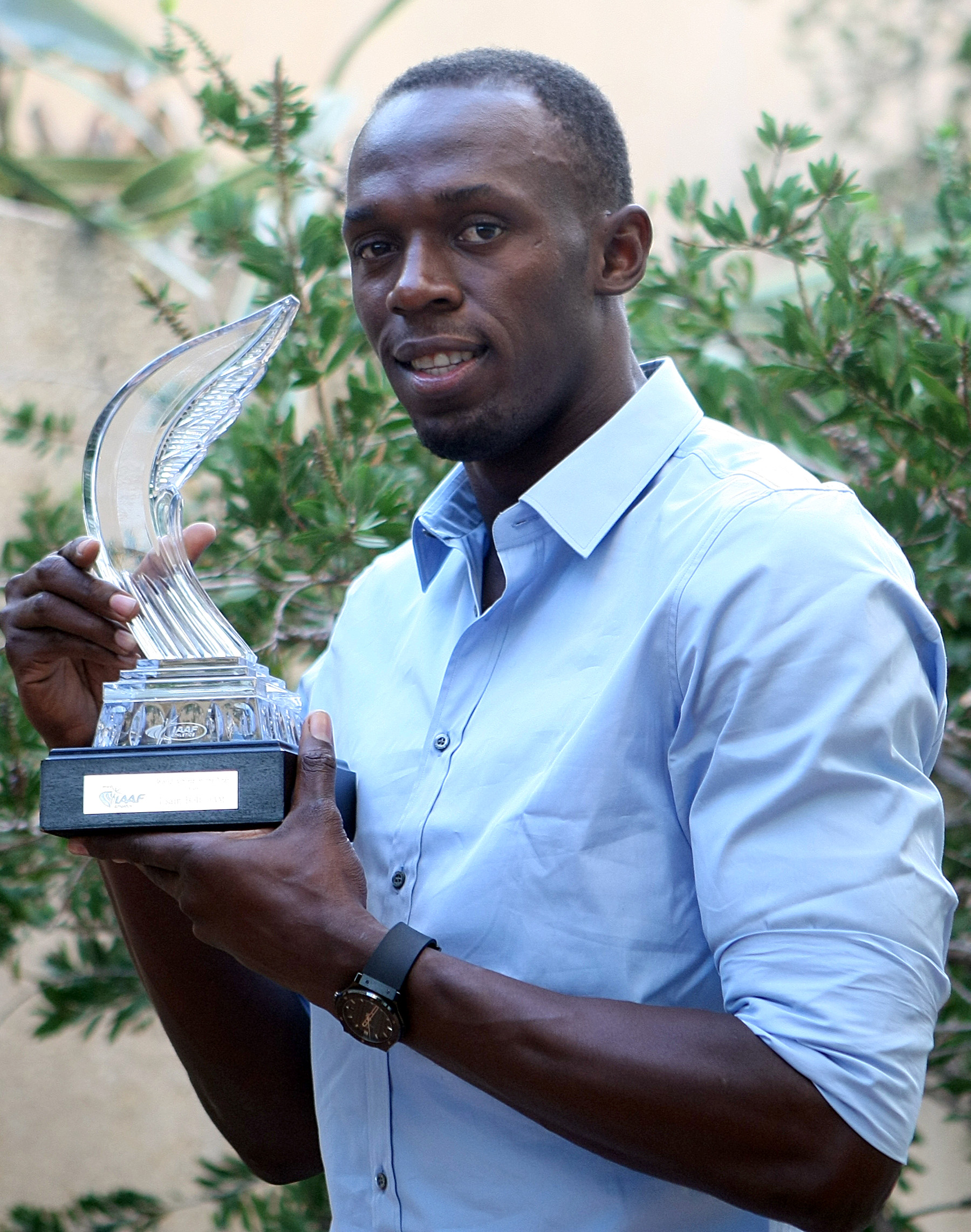
Sprinter Usain Bolt, here holding the 2011 trophy, was World Athlete of the Year in 2008, 2009, 2011–2013, and 2016, more times than any other athlete.

The World Athletics Awards are annual awards to honor athletes participating in events within the sport of athletics. These are organised by World Athletics and include track and field, cross country running, road running, and racewalking.

The first athletes awarded World Athlete of the Year in 1988 were Americans, namely sprinter Florence Griffith-Joyner and track and field athlete Carl Lewis.

Jamaican sprinter Usain Bolt is the only athlete to win the World Athlete of the Year Awards six times. Swedish pole vaulter Armand Duplantis has also won the award four times including the inaugural World Athlete of the Year (Men's Field) award in 2023 after World Athletics Awards changed from crowning a sole male and female winner to issuing awards across six categories. Russian pole vaulter Yelena Isinbayeva and Morocco's middle-distance runner Hicham El Guerrouj have won the main award three times. American track and field athletes Marion Jones (sprinter), Sanya Richards-Ross (sprinter), Carl Lewis (sprinter and long jumper), Michael Johnson (sprinter), Sydney McLaughlin-Levrone (hurdler and sprinter), Ethiopia's long-distance runner Kenenisa Bekele, Kenya's long-distance runner Eliud Kipchoge and Venezuela's triple-jumper Yulima Rojas have won the award twice each.

The Rising Star of the Year award was inaugurated in 1998, when Great Britain's sprinter Christian Malcolm was awarded. The first woman to be voted was 400 m and 400 m H specialist, Jana Pittman of Australia, in 2000.

Ethiopian long-distance runner Kenenisa Bekele was the first to receive Rising Star award followed by Athlete of the Year trophy in 2003 and 2004 respectively. The other athletes to achieve the feat were Jamaican sprinter Usain Bolt, American sprinter Allyson Felix, Belgian heptathlete Nafissatou Thiam, Venezuelan triple jumper Yulimar Rojas, American hurdler and sprinter Sydney McLaughlin-Levrone, Swedish pole vaulter Armand Duplantis, and Norwegian hurdler Karsten Warholm. Jamaican sprinter Usain Bolt and American sprinter Erriyon Knighton are the only two athletes to be crowned Rising Star twice.

== Changes to awards system ==
In 2003, the International Fair Play Committee (CIFP) first collaborated with World Athletics to look for moments that epitomise fair play during biennial World Athletics Championships with a view to recognising one athlete or moment with the CIFP Fair Play award. In earlier years of the award, the nomination pool included track & filed athletes who had then retired but had made a lasting name for themselves both as competitors as well as in their daily lives. In 2023, the partnership expanded the nomination period for award consideration beyond just the World Athletics Championships to include all World Athletics Series events and Continental Tour series events throughout the course of the year to enrich the pool of eligible athletes and potential nominations.

In 2009, on the recommendation of IAAF Press Commission, the IAAF World Journalist Award was created to mark outstanding lifetime contributions in the field of athletics journalism. Germany's Gustav Schwenk was the first recipient of this award. The award was last given out in 2015.

In 2015, World Athletics (then IAAF) together with their sponsor Adidas launched the Golden Shoe award to recognise the Best Performer of the IAAF World Championships, Beijing 2015. The award went to Almaz Ayana (ETH). 2015 was the singular year the Golden Shoe Award was presented by Adidas. Following the doping crisis sweeping the sport and implicating World Athletics directly, Adidas decided to terminate their sponsorship deal with World Athletics three years earlier ending in 2016 instead of 2019.

In 2020, three new awards were created amongst the eight given out at the annual World Athletics Awards ceremony to commemorate the challenges faced by athletes, event organisers and their support groups in the wake of the COVID-19 pandemic. The new honours were namely Covid inspiration award, athletes community award and member federations award.

In 2023, the World Athlete of the Year awards for men and women were expanded into three event categories: track, field, and out of stadium.

In 2024, World Athletics further revamped the World Athletics Awards system. Besides the three separate World Athlete of the Year awards for each gender, there will also be men's and women's awards for an "overall World Athlete of the Year". Two finalists in each of the three category will progress to be considered for the overall World Athlete of the Year awards.

The system for selecting the winner for 2024 had also changed. As before, a three-way voting process with votes from the World Athletics Council (50%), World Athletics Family (25%) and the public via social media (25%) determined the finalists. However, a final round of voting cast by fans of the sport decided the overall World Athlete of the Year once the finalists had been established.

Letsile Tebogo and Sifan Hassan were the first men's and women's recipients of this overall winner awards in 2024. Each of them won two awards. Besides the overall award, they won the Athlete of the Year award for their event category too: Tebego was voted the Men's Track Athlete of the Year and Hassan was the winner of the Women's Out of Stadium Athlete of the Year award.

=== Annual awards ===
As of 2024, the World Athletics Awards included the World Athlete of the Year awards, Rising Star awards, Coaching Achievement Award, Woman of the Year, Photograph of the Year, Member Federation Award, President's Award and CIFP Fair Play award. The CIFP Fair Play award, previously a biennial award given out after each World Athletics Championships, became an annual award after the expansion of nomination period in 2023.

=== Occasional awards ===
Awards that were given out on occasion when there are deserving nominees included the Lifetime Achievement awards (various types including those for athletes & coaches), Inspiration awards, World Athletics City award, Distinguished Career awards and Master Athlete of the Year awards.

=== Past awards ===
Past awards that had been discontinued included Performance of the Year awards, World Journalist awards and Journalist Lifetime Achievement award.

=== Special awards ===
Special awards were given out in the past to honor the outstanding achievements of an athlete and/or to commemorate a special milestone in the history of the sport. These included the historic Athlete of the 20th Century awards (1999), an award to mark 80 Years of Women Athletes at the Olympic Games (2008) and the Special Olympic awards given out after the Beijing Games (2008).

== Athlete of the Year winners ==
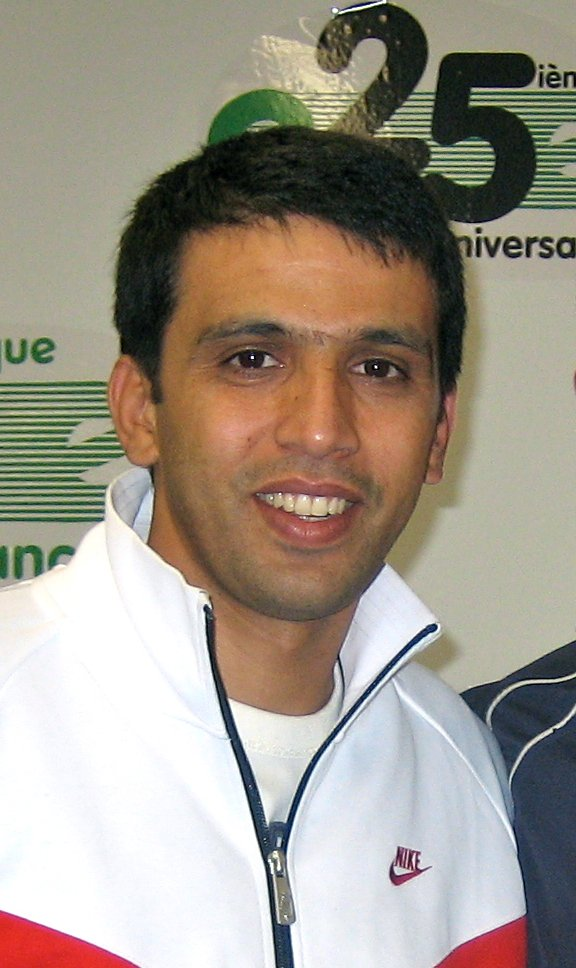
Middle-distance runner Hicham El Guerrouj has won the World Athlete of the Year award three times in 2001–2003.

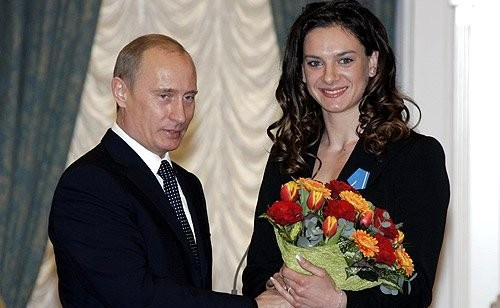
Pole vaulter Yelena Isinbayeva was World Athlete of the Year in 2004, 2005 and 2008, the most wins in the female category, because Marion Jones's third award was annulled.

World Athlete of the Year winners
Year	Men	Women	Ref.
1988	(United States) Carl Lewis (1/2)	(United States) Florence Griffith Joyner	
1989	(United States) Roger Kingdom	(Cuba) Ana Fidelia Quirot	
1990	(United Kingdom) Steve Backley	(Jamaica) Merlene Ottey	
1991	(United States) Carl Lewis (2/2)	(Germany) Katrin Krabbe	
1992	(United States) Kevin Young	(Germany) Heike Henkel	
1993	(United Kingdom) Colin Jackson	(United Kingdom) Sally Gunnell	
1994	(Algeria) Noureddine Morceli	(United States) Jackie Joyner-Kersee	
1995	(United Kingdom) Jonathan Edwards	(United States) Gwen Torrence	
1996	(United States) Michael Johnson (1/2)	(Russia) Svetlana Masterkova	
1997	(Denmark) Wilson Kipketer	(United States) Marion Jones (1/2)	
1998	(Ethiopia) Haile Gebrselassie	(United States) Marion Jones (2/2)	
1999	(United States) Michael Johnson (2/2)	(Romania) Gabriela Szabo	
2000	(Czech Republic) Jan Železný	~~(United States) Marion Jones~~ (Note: In 2007, Marion Jones's award was annulled by the IAAF after she had pleaded guilty to the use of steroids in 2000 and 2001.)	
2001	(Morocco) Hicham El Guerrouj (1/3)	(United States) Stacy Dragila	
2002	(Morocco) Hicham El Guerrouj (2/3)	(United Kingdom) Paula Radcliffe	
2003	(Morocco) Hicham El Guerrouj (3/3)	(South Africa) Hestrie Cloete	
2004	(Ethiopia) Kenenisa Bekele (1/2)	(Russia) Yelena Isinbayeva (1/3)	
2005	(Ethiopia) Kenenisa Bekele (2/2)	(Russia) Yelena Isinbayeva (2/3)	
2006	(Jamaica) Asafa Powell	(United States) Sanya Richards (1/2)	
2007	(United States) Tyson Gay	(Ethiopia) Meseret Defar	
2008	(Jamaica) Usain Bolt (1/6)	(Russia) Yelena Isinbayeva (3/3)	
2009	(Jamaica) Usain Bolt (2/6)	(United States) Sanya Richards (2/2)	
2010	(Kenya) David Rudisha	(Croatia) Blanka Vlašić	
2011	(Jamaica) Usain Bolt (3/6)	(Australia) Sally Pearson	
2012	(Jamaica) Usain Bolt (4/6)	(United States) Allyson Felix	
2013	(Jamaica) Usain Bolt (5/6)	(Jamaica) Shelly-Ann Fraser-Pryce	
2014	(France) Renaud Lavillenie	(New Zealand) Valerie Adams	
2015	(United States) Ashton Eaton	(Ethiopia) Genzebe Dibaba	
2016	(Jamaica) Usain Bolt (6/6)	(Ethiopia) Almaz Ayana	
2017	(Qatar) Mutaz Essa Barshim	(Belgium) Nafissatou Thiam	
2018	(Kenya) Eliud Kipchoge (1/2)	(Colombia) Caterine Ibargüen	
2019	(Kenya) Eliud Kipchoge (2/2)	(United States) Dalilah Muhammad	
2020	(Sweden) Armand Duplantis (1/4)	(Venezuela) Yulimar Rojas (1/2)	
2021	(Norway) Karsten Warholm	(Jamaica) Elaine Thompson-Herah	
2022	(Sweden) Armand Duplantis (2/4)	(United States) Sydney McLaughlin-Levrone (1/2)	
2023	Track: (United States) Noah Lyles; Field: (Sweden) Armand Duplantis (3/4); Out of stadium: (Kenya) Kelvin Kiptum	Track: (Kenya) Faith Kipyegon; Field: (Venezuela) Yulimar Rojas (2/2); Out of stadium: (Ethiopia) Tigist Assefa	
2024 (Note: Both Tebogo and Hassan won two awards each in 2024 after a revamp of the awards system: Overall World Athlete of the Year award for men and women respectively and Athlete of the Year award in their respective event discipline. Only the overall winner award shall be counted towards statistics with the exception of the year 2023 where there was no overall winner award given out.)	(Botswana) Letsile Tebogo	(Netherlands) Sifan Hassan	
2025	(Sweden) Armand Duplantis (4/4)	(United States) Sydney McLaughlin-Levrone (2/2)	

Won per country

Awards won per country
Country	Awards
United States	21
Jamaica	10
Ethiopia	7
Kenya	5
United Kingdom	5
Russia	4
Sweden	4
Morocco	3
Germany	2
Venezuela	2
Algeria	1
Australia	1
Belgium	1
Botswana	1
Colombia	1
Croatia	1
Cuba	1
Czech Republic	1
Denmark	1
France	1
Netherlands	1
New Zealand	1
Norway	1
Qatar	1
Romania	1
South Africa	1

Track, Field & Out of stadium Athlete of the Year winners
Year	Men's Track	Men's Field	Men's Out of stadium	Women's Track	Women's Field	Women's Out of stadium	Ref.
2023	(United States) Noah Lyles	(Sweden) Armand Duplantis	(Kenya) Kelvin Kiptum	(Kenya) Faith Kipyegon	(Venezuela) Yulimar Rojas	(Ethiopia) Tigist Assefa	
2024	(Botswana) Letsile Tebogo	(Sweden) Armand Duplantis	(Ethiopia) Tamirat Tola	(United States) Sydney McLaughlin-Levrone	(Ukraine) Yaroslava Mahuchikh	(Netherlands) Sifan Hassan	
2025	(Kenya) Emmanuel Wanyonyi	(Sweden) Armand Duplantis	(Kenya) Sabastian Sawe	(United States) Sydney McLaughlin-Levrone	(Australia) Nicola Olyslagers	(Spain) María Pérez	

== Rising Star winners ==
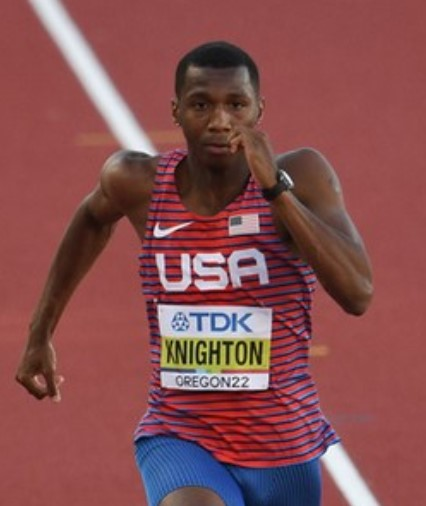
Sprinter Erriyon Knighton is one of the two athletes that won the Rising Star of the Year award twice, in 2021 and 2022. Usain Bolt achieved that feat in 2002 and 2003.

The Rising Star of the Year award for the best under-20 athlete was introduced by World Athletics in 1998. In 2008, the award was presented as "Revelation of the Year Award".

Rising Star of the Year winners
Year	Men	Women	Ref.
1998	(United Kingdom) Christian Malcolm	–	
1999	not awarded		
2000	(Saudi Arabia) Hamdan Al-Bishi	(Australia) Jana Pittman	
2001	not awarded		
2002	(Jamaica) Usain Bolt (1/2)	(Sweden) Carolina Kluft	
2003	(Jamaica) Usain Bolt (2/2) (Ethiopia) Kenenisa Bekele (Kenya) Eliud Kipchoge	(United States) Allyson Felix (Ethiopia) Tirunesh Dibaba	
2004	not awarded		
2005	(United Kingdom) Harry Aikines-Aryeetey	–	
2006	(Estonia) Margus Hunt	–	
2007	–	(Kenya) Ruth Bosibori	
2008	–	(Kenya) Pamela Jelimo (Note: As Revelation of the Year award)	
2009	not awarded		
2010	(Germany) Till Wöschler	(Sweden) Angelica Bengtsson	
2011	(Grenada) Kirani James	(Germany) Christin Hussong	
2012	(Trinidad and Tobago) Keshorn Walcott	(The Bahamas) Anthonique Strachan	
2013	–	(United States) Mary Cain	
2014	(France) Wilhem Belocian	(United Kingdom) Morgan Lake	
2015	(Japan) Abdul Hakim Sani Brown	(United States) Candace Hill	
2016	(Canada) Andre De Grasse	(Belgium) Nafissatou Thiam	
2017	(Norway) Karsten Warholm	(Venezuela) Yulimar Rojas	
2018	(Sweden) Armand Duplantis	(United States) Sydney McLaughlin	
2019	(Ethiopia) Selemon Barega	(Ukraine) Yaroslava Mahuchikh	
2020	not awarded (Note: Not awarded due to the COVID-19 pandemic)		
2021	(United States) Erriyon Knighton (1/2)	(United States) Athing Mu	
2022	(United States) Erriyon Knighton (2/2)	(Serbia) Adriana Vilagoš	
2023	(Kenya) Emmanuel Wanyonyi	(Kenya) Faith Cherotich	
2024	(Italy) Mattia Furlani	(Ethiopia) Sembo Almayew	
2025	(Kenya) Edmund Serem	(China) Zhang Jiale	

Won per country

Awards won per country
Country	Awards
United States	7
Kenya	6
Ethiopia	4
United Kingdom	3
Sweden	3
Germany	2
Jamaica	2
Australia	1
Bahamas	1
Belgium	1
Canada	1
China	1
Estonia	1
France	1
Grenada	1
Italy	1
Japan	1
Norway	1
Saudi Arabia	1
Serbia	1
Trinidad and Tobago	1
Ukraine	1
Venezuela	1

== Fair Play award winners ==
The Fair Play award was introduced in 2003 by World Athletics in partnership with CIFP. Initially, the award was presented near the end of a World Championships edition but since 2019, it was part of the World Athletics Awards.

- 2003 – Jonathan Edwards (GBR)
- 2005 – Frank Fredericks (NAM) & Heike Drechsler (GER) (Note: Award was given after the athlete retired)
- 2007 – Mike Powell (USA)
- 2009 – Lars Riedel (GER)
- 2011 – Koji Murofushi (JPN)
- 2013 – Igor Ter-Ovanesyan (USSR)
- 2015 – Not awarded
- 2017 – Ruth Beitia (ESP)

Beitia was recognised for her efforts to console Alessia Trost of Italy after she failed to qualify for the final in the women's high jump at the IAAF World Championships London 2017. It was an emotional moment for the 24-year-old Trost, whose mother and former coach passed away in the last year.

- 2019 – Braima Suncar Dabó (GBS)

Dabo, a distance runner from Guinea-Bissau, made headlines around the world after he helped fellow runner, Jonathan Busby of Aruba, to the finish line during their opening round heat of the 5000m at the 2019 World Championships in Doha. Busby was near collapse with about 200 metres left in the race, when Dabo stopped to help his distressed fellow competitor.

- 2022 – Katie Nageotte (USA) & Holly Bradshaw (GBR)

In Oregon, at 2022 World Athletics Championships, Bradshaw injured herself after her pole snapped during the pole vault warm-up session. Her fellow competitor Nageotte immediately went over to support her. Bradshaw received a lot of abuse on social media for withdrawing from the competition, but Nageotte again offered support by taking to Twitter in defence of her competitor.

- 2023 – Letesenbet Gidey (ETH)

Gidey's fair play moment occurred at the World Athletics Championships Budapest 23. After securing silver in the women's 10,000m, Gidey went back to comfort Netherlands’ Sifan Hassan after Hassan's dramatic fall on the home straight.

- 2024 – Sander Skotheim (NOR)

At Paris 2024, despite the disappointment of no-heighting in the pole vault and losing contention for a decathlon medal, Skotheim continued to compete and unselfishly supported his compatriot Markus Rooth in the final discipline – the 1500m. Rooth eventually clinched the Olympic gold for Norway by 48 points.

- 2025 – Tim Van de Velde (BEL)

Van de Velde’s fair play moment occurred during the 3000m steeplechase heats at the World Championships in Tokyo. Colombia’s Carlos San Martin was injured during a fall earlier in the race and, as they approached the finish line, Van de Velde decided to turn back to help San Martin to cross the finish line – fully aware that it might lead to his disqualification – in a true demonstration of sportsmanship and humanity.

== Coaching Achievement award winners ==
The award was first presented in 2006 and had several variation before its current name:

- Coach of the Year Award or Coaches Award (2006–2007, 2009–2010)
- Coaching Lifetime Achievement Award (2011 and 2012)
- Coaching Achievement Award (2013–present).

Coaching Achievement award winners
Year	Winner	Ref.
2006	(Ethiopia) Woldemeskel Kostre	
2007	(Ukraine) Vitaly Petrov	
2008	Not awarded	
2009	(United States) Clyde Hart	
2010	(Cuba) Santiago Antúnez	
2011	(Kenya) John Velzian	
2012	(Jamaica) Glen Mills	
2013	(United States) Alberto Salazar	
2014	(United States) Tom Tellez	
2015	(Netherlands) Bart Bennema	
2016	(United States) Harry Marra	
2017	(Namibia) Anna Botha	
2018	(United States) Joe Vigil	
2019	(Republic of Ireland) Colm O'Connell	
2020	(United States) Helena and Greg Duplantis	
2021	(United States) Bobby Kersee	
2022	(Ukraine) Gennadii Zuiev	
2023	(Switzerland) Laurent Meuwly	
2024	(United Kingdom) Trevor Painter	
2025	(Republic of Ireland) Michael O’Connor	

== Inspiration award winners ==
The Inspiration award was first given out in 2000. It recognises an individual or group of individuals whose efforts have resulted in a particularly inspiring athletics event or experience.

- Years Awarded
  - 2000 – Cathy Freeman (AUS)
  - 2007 – Haile Gebrselassie (ETH) & Paula Radcliffe (GBR)
  - 2008 – Henry Rono (KEN)
  - 2012 – Aries Merritt (USA)
  - 2020 – Ultimate Garden Clash, an original idea by Renaud Lavillenie (FRA) (Note: As Covid Inspiration award)
  - 2021 – Mutaz Barshim (QAT) & Gianmarco Tamberi (ITA)
- Years Not Awarded
  - 2001 to 2006
  - 2009 to 2011
  - 2013 to 2020
  - 2022 to 2024

== Woman of the Year winners ==
The Woman of the Year Award celebrates individuals who have made an outstanding contribution to the sport, particularly in advancing opportunities for women and girls. The award started out in 2014 as "Women in Athletics Award" before it was changed by World Athletics in 2019 to "Women of the Year Award".

Woman of the Year winners
Year	Women	Ref.
2014	(United States) Evie Garrett Dennis	
2015	Not awarded	
2016	(Greece) Polyxeni Argeitak	
2017	(United Kingdom) Cherry Alexander	
2018	(Puerto Rico) Evelyn Claudio Lopez	
2019	(Ethiopia) Derartu Tulu	
2020	Not awarded	
2021	(India) Anju Bobby George	
2022	(United Kingdom) Donna Fraser	
2023	(Togo) Falilatou Tchanile-Salifou	
2024	(United States) Renee Washington	
2025	(Kenya) Ruth Jepchumba Bundotich	

== President's award winners ==
The President's award was inaugurated in 2016 during the tenure of Sebastian Coe, President of World Athletics (2015–present) to recognise and honour exceptional service to athletics.

- 2016 – Tegla Loroupe (KEN)
- 2017 – Usain Bolt (JAM)
- 2018 – Andreas Brugger (SUI)
- 2019 – Vikki Orvice (GBR)
- 2020 – Tommie Smith (USA), Peter Norman (AUS) and John Carlos (USA)
- 2021 – Peter Diamond (USA)
- 2022 – Ukrainian Athletic Federation
- 2023 – Abbott World Marathon Majors
- 2024 – Phil Knight (USA)
- 2025 - Bruce McAvaney (AUS)

== Photograph of the Year winners ==
The World Athletics Photograph of the Year was first awarded in 2017.

Photograph of the Year winners
Year	Winner (organisation)	Ref.
2017	(United Kingdom) Paul Sanwell (freelance)	
2018	(Spain) Felix Sanchez Arrazola (freelance)	
2019	(Spain) Felix Sanchez Arrazola (freelance)	
2020	(United Kingdom) Michael Steele (Getty Images)	
2021	(Australia) Ryan Pierse (Getty Images)	
2022	(United Kingdom) Martin Rickett (PA Media)	
2023	(Italy) Mattia Ozbot (freelance)	
2024	(United Kingdom) Michael Steele (Getty Images)	
2025	(Norway) Vegard Grott (Bildbyrån)	

== Member Federation award winners ==
The Member Federation award was inaugurated in 2020.

Member Federation award winners
Year	Winner	Ref.
2020	(Poland) Polish Athletics Association	
2021	(Costa Rica) Costa Rican Athletics Federation	
2022	(Brazil) Brazilian Athletics Confederation	
2023	Athletics Australia	
2024	(United States) USA Track & Field	
2025	(China) Chinese Athletics Association	
