= Mobile phone throwing =

Sport in which participants throw mobile phones

Mobile phone throwing is an international sport that began in Finland in the year 2000. It's a sport in which participants throw mobile phones and are judged on distance or technique. The world record holder is Dries Feremans, with an official Guinness World Record throw of 110m 42 cm.

There are usually four categories in the sport:

- Original (also called "Traditional"): an over-the-shoulder throw with the farthest distance winning (best of three)
- Freestyle: contestants get points for aesthetics and creative choreography
- Team original: up to three competitors have one throw each, with their scores combined at the end
- Junior: for children aged twelve or younger

The phones used vary not just between events but between competitors, with any phone that weighs over 220 grams being acceptable. At some events, the choice is down to personal preference from phone models provided by the event organisers, while other events provide the same phone model to all contestants.

== Rules ==
The sponsor provides the phones used in the Mobile Phone Throwing World Championships. There are many different kinds of phones to choose from, weighing between 220g to 400g. Every competitor can choose between any of the phones that are provided. During the throw, the competitor must stay within the throwing area. If the thrower steps over the area, the throw will be disqualified. The phone must land within the marked throwing sector. The official jury of the competition will accept or disqualify the throw. Also, there is no drug testing but if the jury believes the competitor is not mentally or physically fit to throw, they will not be allowed to enter. The jury's decisions are final and cannot be protested.

1. Rules for Juniors: Traditional over-the-shoulder throw. Only for children 12 years and under (ID must be presented upon request). The one who can throw the phone farthest is the winner; there's one throw per competitor.
2. Rules for Freestyle: No age limits. Team and individual series teams can comprise from men or women, max. 3 people per team. In this category, throws will be judged by their style and aesthetics. Points are awarded on a scale from 1 to 6 and the competitor with the highest score wins. One throw per competitor.
3. Rules for Original: Traditional over-the-shoulder throw. Only the length of the throw counts, the one who can throw the mobile phone the furthest is the winner, one throw per competitor, a separate series for men and women.
4. Rules for Team Original: Traditional over-the-shoulder throw. Max. 3 persons per team. Teams can either be men or women, team members' scores will be summed up and the highest score wins. One throw per competitor.

== History ==
Mobile Phone Throwing became a hit when first arranged in year 2000 in Savonlinna, Finland. Its organizer was the translation and interpretation company Fennolingua. Its multi-national personnel and many athletics threw away their frustrations along with the mobile phones. Local recycling centers were a partner and they collected all the toxic waste. The Mobile Phone Throwing World Championships has been arranged every year since the year 2000 in Savonlinna in late August. All the international interest on the Championships has now led to official national championships all over Europe. The first national championships were organized in Trondheim, Norway in June 2004. The first prize was a trip to the World Championships to Savonlinna, Finland. In February 2005 there were the first winter championships in Stoos, Switzerland. The winners from both Original and Freestyle categories won trips to the World Championships to Savonlinna. The first German championships were arranged in June 2005 in Northern Germany. People could also buy a new mobile phone at the Championships. The winner gets a new mobile phone. Throwers and international media were immediately very interested and every year the Championships gathered a wide range of nationalities to Savonlinna to throw the cell phones.

Lawrence University has hosted a Rotary Phone Throw in 2005, 2006, and 2007. This competition has similar rules to the mobile phone throw, yet uses rotary phones.

== World and national championships ==
The Mobile Phone Throwing World Championships have been held annually since 2000 in Savonlinna, Finland. The first national competition was held in Trondheim, Norway, in June 2004, with several other countries across Europe also staging their own events. The first winter championships were held in Stoos, Switzerland, in February 2005. Commonly, the prize for first place in a national event is entry to the world championships, and the grand prize for winning the world championship is a new mobile phone. Many events are supported by mobile phone recycling organizations and promote the recycling of the phones.

In the UK, the championships are held every August and organized by 8th Day UK Ltd. The first event, in 2005, was held at Richmond Golf Driving Range, and the 2006 event at Tooting Bec Athletics Track in London. ActionAid Recycling partnered the event to raise awareness for mobile phone recycling and raised money from donated phones for the first two years, but due to the involvement of a casino (Golden Palace) in the 2007 event and the associations this would have in relation to charity, are no longer involved.

In 2007, the UK event was held at Old Hamptonians Rugby Club on 12 August, with throws recorded from 3.70 m to 95.83 m, a new unofficial world record. The men's winner was Chris Hughff, and the ladies' winner was Jan Singleton, both successfully defending their 2006 titles. There were also throws recorded by a penguin and a gorilla, prompting a new category — fancy dress – to be incorporated for 2008. The 2008 competition was held at the same location, with Jan Singleton defending her title and Jeremy Gallop claiming the men's title. Madeleine James set a new benchmark for the Under 3 Category of 1.57 m.

The 2007 world championships were in Savonlinna as usual. The winner of the men's freestyle event, Taco Cohen of the Netherlands, won for a novel performance that incorporated juggling and acrobatics.

Two thousand nine saw the UK event move to Battersea Park Athletics Stadium, with Jeremy Gallop (89.10 m) defending his title and Julia Geene (33.40 m) winning the ladies' event. Peter Yates set a new Vets record of 75.20 m, and Oliver James set an Under 2 record of 2.05 m. The fancy dress event was won by Morph, who threw 54.73 m. The event was run alongside the Sumo Suit Athletics World Championships.

In 2010, the event was again held together with the Sumo Suit Athletics World Championships in Battersea Park Athletics track. Both Jeremy Gallop and Julia Geens successfully defended their titles, with throws of 88.51 m and 32.00 m respectively. In the men's event, there was a 1st prize of an Xbox 360 sponsored by BuyMobilePhones.net in an effort to raise awareness about mobile recycling.

The World event for 2010 was to be held on 21 August 2010 but for unknown reasons (as yet), was canceled.

On August 24, 2013, the World Mobile Phone Throwing Championships took place in Savonlinna, Finland. Over eighty people from six different countries participated in the event that has grown immensely since its conception in 2000. The 2013 Champion for the Men's Traditional Division, Riku Haverinen, cast his 220-gram mobile device a staggering 97.7 meters (the length of a full football field.) This is five meters short of the World record of 102.68 m set in 2012 by Chris Hughff from Great Britain. Coming in second in the Men's Traditional Division was Ikka Aaltonen with 87.88 m, followed by Otto Sammalisto with a valiant effort of 86.09 m. These three top performers, all from Finland, represented the host country in the 2013 Championships. In the Women's Traditional Division, the champion Asa Lundgren threw her mobile device 40.41 m, impressive as it was only after a few times practicing. The Women's Traditional Division was much closer than the Men's, with second place with a score of 39.88 m from Louise Van De Ginste, Belgian winner from earlier in the summer of 2013. Van De Ginste was followed by third-place finisher Tanja Pakarinen, who launched a mobile device 36.69 m. Again the Finns dominated the competition with two of the top three finishers being from Finland. The Freestyle division was won by Erika Vilpponen, with a stellar performance with a circus bike paired with a throw of the mobile device backwards over the shoulder. It was a clear victory for Erika according to the panel of judges. After this year's championships, new divisions are being looked at for future championships.

Other tournaments

The Spanish championships are held in Tarragona, Catalonia, during the celebrations of Carnival in February or March. The 2009 tournament was held on Sunday, 22 February in the Francoli Park, Tarragona.

=== United States ===
On August 1, 2008, the United States held its first national championship in South Hadley, Massachusetts, at Buttery Brook Park, sponsored by Family Wireless. The United States event has also dedicated itself to recycling cellular phones.

There was a second cell phone throwing contest held in the United States on July 5, 2009, at Szot Park in Chicopee, Massachusetts. It was sponsored by Family Wireless. The finalist for the American event was Daniel Taylor from San Diego, California. He threw an iPhone for a distance of 78.9 yards (Approx. 72.15 meters.)

=== Czech Republic ===
The first Czech mobile phone throwing tournament was held in June 2012 by non-profit organization ASEKOL which collects waste electrical and electronic equipment. The championship was held to inform people about separation of electric waste. It took place in Prague and world records were set in both men's and women's categories. Men's record was beaten later in Savonlinna but the women's record from Czech Republic is still the best one in its category. It was set by Tereza Kopicová who threw a cell phone 60.24 meters.

=== Liechtenstein ===
The first national championships for Liechtenstein were held on 29 May 2010 in the town Ruggell. They were completed in accordance with the Finnish rules with the same four categories.

Johannes Heeb won in the men's category with a throw of 74.2 m, and the women's category was won by Stephanie Parusel, throwing 48.5 m. Manuel Hug won the juniors with a throw of 55.9 m, while the team category was won by Team "Schulzentrum Unterland" with 196 m. The Team consisted of the two 9th grade pupils Mert Dogan and Benjamin Gstoehl and their sports teacher Florian Wild who by the way made the farest throw in the competition with 86.4m. The current Swiss national record holder, Dino Roguljic, made a "celebrity" appearance and managed to throw 66.2 m.

=== Freestyle ===
Freestyle phone throwing is an event held in which contestants enter a mat that is around 1" thick to soften the impact in case a phone is dropped. Players begin performing a series of tricks that include various flips, spins, high throws, etc. If one drops one's mobile phone, he or she is automatically out, and judges take his score from that point. One minute is given for a total "run time", and after the minute is up if one has not dropped one's phone, he or she gets a score from 1 to 100. Phone classes include standard phones, which are free, to $50 phones with either no moving device such as slide or flip open, or with the standard flip open style. The second class is the "Advanced" class, which includes phones with full keyboards, slide movement devices, side-kick flip devices, or touch screens. This class is based on the fact that if the phone is dropped, there is more of a consequence since the phones are so elaborate and/or expensive.

=== Belgium ===
The first national championships for Belgium were held in July 2006 in Ghent. Since 2010 JIM Mobile is organizing the event. Last year's champion had a throw of 62.70 m. The Belgian Champion of 2011 had a throw of 63.94 m. More info can be found at mobilepoint.pentamediatechnologies.com or www.jimmobile.be. On 27 August 2014 javelin thrower Dries Feremans threw a world record of 110m42 in Kessel-Lo.

=== Austria ===
In August 2016 in Korneuburg the "Internationalen Österreichischen Mobiltelefonweitwurfmeisterschaften" were hosted by Tw!ne. Winner of the event was Jürgen Eberhart with a distance of 62,80m. On the 23. September 2017 the Austrian Athletics Federation organized a competition during a public sports day in Vienna. 8 young javelin throwers competed in this event and were throwing iPhones. Adam Wiener won the event with 92,34m and his Sister Ivonne had a distance of 67,58m. oelv.at

== Records ==
The current records are:

- Men's world record - 110.42 meters (362.3 feet) Dries Feremans (August 2014).
- Women's world record - 67.58 meters (221.7 feet) Ivonne Wiener (September 2017)

=== Men's seasons best ===
- (Updated June 2019)

YEAR	DISTANCE	ATHLETE	PLACE
2000	48.00	Erno Riihela (FIN)	Finland
2001	57.03	Ejani Torpo (FIN)	Finland
2002	66.72	Petri Valta (FIN)	Finland
2003	66.62	Samu Santala (FIN)	Finland
2004	82.55	Ville Piippo (FIN)	Finland
2005	94.97	Mikko Lampi (FIN)	Finland
2006	92.30		London
2007	95.83		London
2008	85.95	Jeremy Gallop (RSA)	London
2009	89.10	Jeremy Gallop (RSA)	London
2010	88.51	Jeremy Gallop (RSA)	London
2011	76.xx	Oskari Heinonen (FIN)	Savonlinna
2012	102.68		Belgium
2014	110.42 (WR)	Dries Feremans (BEL)	Belgium
2019	79.50	Paweł Janicki (POL)	Przemysl

=== Top ten men's best throwers of all time ===
- (Updated June 2019)

RANK	MARK	ATHLETE	PLACE	DATE
1.	110.42	Dries Feremans (BEL)	Belgium	2014-08-27
2.	102.68	Tom Philipp Reinhardt (GER)	London	2018-07-21
3.	101.46	Ere Karjalainen (FIN)	Savonlinna	2012-08-18
4.	97.34	Tomáš Benda (CZE)	Prague	2012-06-05
5.	95.59	Simon Wells (GBR)	London	2007-08-12
6.	94.97	Mikko Lampi (FIN)	Savonlinna	2005-08-27
7.	94.67	Jeremy Gallop (RSA)	Savonlinna	2012-08-18
8.	93.95	Lucián Berger (CZE)	Prague	2012-06-05
9.	93.33	Sondre Bjornbet (NOR)	Savonlinna	2005-08-27
10.	92.34	Adam Wiener (AUT)	Vienna	2017-09-23
11.	90.00	Ville Piippo (FIN)	Savonlinna	2005-08-27
12.	89.62	Huotari Tommi (FIN)	Savonlinna	2007-08-25
13.	89.00	Lassi Etelätalo (FIN)	Savonlinna	2006-08-26
14.	79.50	Paweł Janicki (POL)	Przemysl	2019-06-01

=== Men's national records ===
- (Updated June 2019)

DISTANCE	ATHLETE	COUNTRY	Year
110.42 (WR)	Dries Feremans (BEL)	Belgium	2014
102.68	Tom Philipp Reinhardt (GER)	Germany	2018
101.46	Ere Karjalainen (FIN)	Finland	2012
97.34	Tomáš Benda (CZE)	Czech Republic	2012
94.67	Jeremy Gallop (RSA)	South Africa	2012
93.33	Sondre Bjornbet (NOR)	Norway	2005
92.34	Adam Wiener (AUT)	Austria	2017
85.00	Timmo Lilium (EST)	Estonia	2008
84.25	Dino Roguljic (SUI)	Switzerland	2005
83.69	William Rainaud (USA)	United States	2008
81.35	Tom Day (UK)	United Kingdom	2009
79.50	Paweł Janicki (POL)	Poland	2019
74.20	Johannes Heeb (LIE)	Liechtenstein	2010
70.81	Björn Forsberg (SWE)	Sweden	2008
70.64	Niels Kuper (NED)	Netherlands	2005
66.00	Paul Aherne (ZIM)	Zimbabwe	2005
65.10	Jay Coffee (NZL)	New Zealand	2009
62.35	Mike Krischonas (AUS)	Australia	2006
61.58	Särkijärvi Kyle (CAN)	Canada	2007
60.10	Neil Rogers (SCO)	Scotland	2009
52.85	Ian Preddy (MEX)	Mexico	2006
44.34	Tim Metzgen (BLZ)	Belize	2006
43.59	Dadonoc Juri (RUS)	Russia	2007
43.59	Martin McCann (IRE)	Ireland	2005
14.30	Rungtip Womgsathagun (THA)	Thailand	2003

=== Women's seasons best ===
- (Updated June 2019)

YEAR	DISTANCE	ATHLETE	PLACE
2000	-	-	-
2001	-	-	-
2002	20.35	Mina Kulju (FIN)	Finland
2003	-	-	-
2004	-	-	-
2005	38.74	Jan Singleton (GBR)	London
2006	53.52	Jan Singleton (GBR)	London
2007	52.05	Jan Singleton (GBR)	London
2008	41.00	Valeria Kadorova (EST)	Estonia
2009	37.05	Suvi Torikka (FIN)	Savonlinna
2010	48.50	Stephanie Parusel (LIE)	Liechtenstein
2011	48.xx	Netta Karvinen (FIN)	Savonlinna
2012	60.24	Tereza Kopicová (CZE)	Prague
2019	41.00	Beata Iwanicka (POL)	Przemysl

=== Top ten women's best throwers of all time ===
- (Updated June 2019)

RANK	MARK	ATHLETE	PLACE	DATE
1.	67.58	Ivonne Wiener (AUT)	Vienna	2017-09-23
2.	60.24	Tereza Kopicová (CZE)	Prague	2012-06-05
3.	54.68	Kateřina Reehová (CZE)	Prague	2012-06-05
4.	53.52	Jan Singleton (GBR)	London	2006-08-20
5.	50.83	Eija Laakso (FIN)	Finland	2006-08-26
6.	48.50	Stephanie Parusel (LIE)	Liechtenstein	2010-05-23
7.	48.xx	Netta Karvinen (FIN)	Finland	2011-08-19
8.	43.34	Sari Säisänen (FIN)	Finland	2006-08-26
9.	42.47	Jonna Mattero (FIN)	Finland	2012-08-18
10.	41.42	Marke Krok (FIN)	Finland	2005-08-27
11.	41.00	Valeria Kadorova (EST)	Estonia	2008-08-23
11.	41.00	Beata Iwanicka (POL)	Poland	2019-06-01
12.	40.94	Elke Oosterlink (BEL)	Belgium	2010-07-21
13.	39.75	Lien Willekens (BEL)	Belgium	2012-07-21

=== Women's national records ===
- (Updated June 2019)

DISTANCE	ATHLETE	COUNTRY	Year
67.58	Ivonne Wiener (AUT)	Austria	2017
60.28	Tereza Kopicová (CZE)	Czech Republic	2012
53.52	Jan Singleton (ENG)	England	2006
50.83	Eija Laakso (FIN)	Finland	2006
48.50	Stephanie Parusel (LIE)	Liechtenstein	2010
41.00	Valeria Kadorova (EST)	Estonia	2008
40.94	Elke Oosterlink (BEL)	Belgium	2010
39.65	Jacqueline Roessler (GER)	Germany	2011
36.28	Cecilie Krohn (NOR)	Norway	2006
34.09	Gabriella Szekely (HUN)	Hungary	2007
31.59	Tanya van Schalkwyk (RSA)	South Africa	2006
28.21	Bec Hanson (AUS)	Australia	2006
27.11	Tracey Belcourt (CAN)	Canada	2009
41.00	Beata Iwanicka (POL)	Poland	2019
14.99	Tilder Frolig (SWE)	Sweden	2006

Record Sources:
