= Salifou =

Salifou or Salifo is a West African masculine given name and surname. Notable people with the name include:

== Given name ==
- Salifou Fatimata Bazeye (born 1954), Nigerien jurist
- Salifo Caropitche (born 2001), Bissau-Guinean footballer
- Salifou Diarrassouba (born 2001), Ivorian footballer
- Salifou Lindou (born 1965), Cameroonian artist
- Salifou Modi (born 1962), Nigerien Army divisional general
- Salifou Koucka Ouiminga (born 1977), Burkinabé judoka
- Salifou Soumah (born 2003), Guinean footballer

== Surname ==
- Amadou Salifou, Nigerien politician
- André Salifou (1942–2022), Nigerien politician
- Dikeni Salifou (born 2003), German footballer
- Dinah Salifou (1830–1897), king of the Nalu people of Guinea
- Falilatou Tchanile-Salifou, Togolese sports administrator
- Moustapha Salifou (born 1983), Togolese footballer
- Safiou Salifou (born 1982), Togolese footballer
