= Athletics at the 2006 Commonwealth Games – Women's marathon =

Women's marathon at the Commonwealth Games

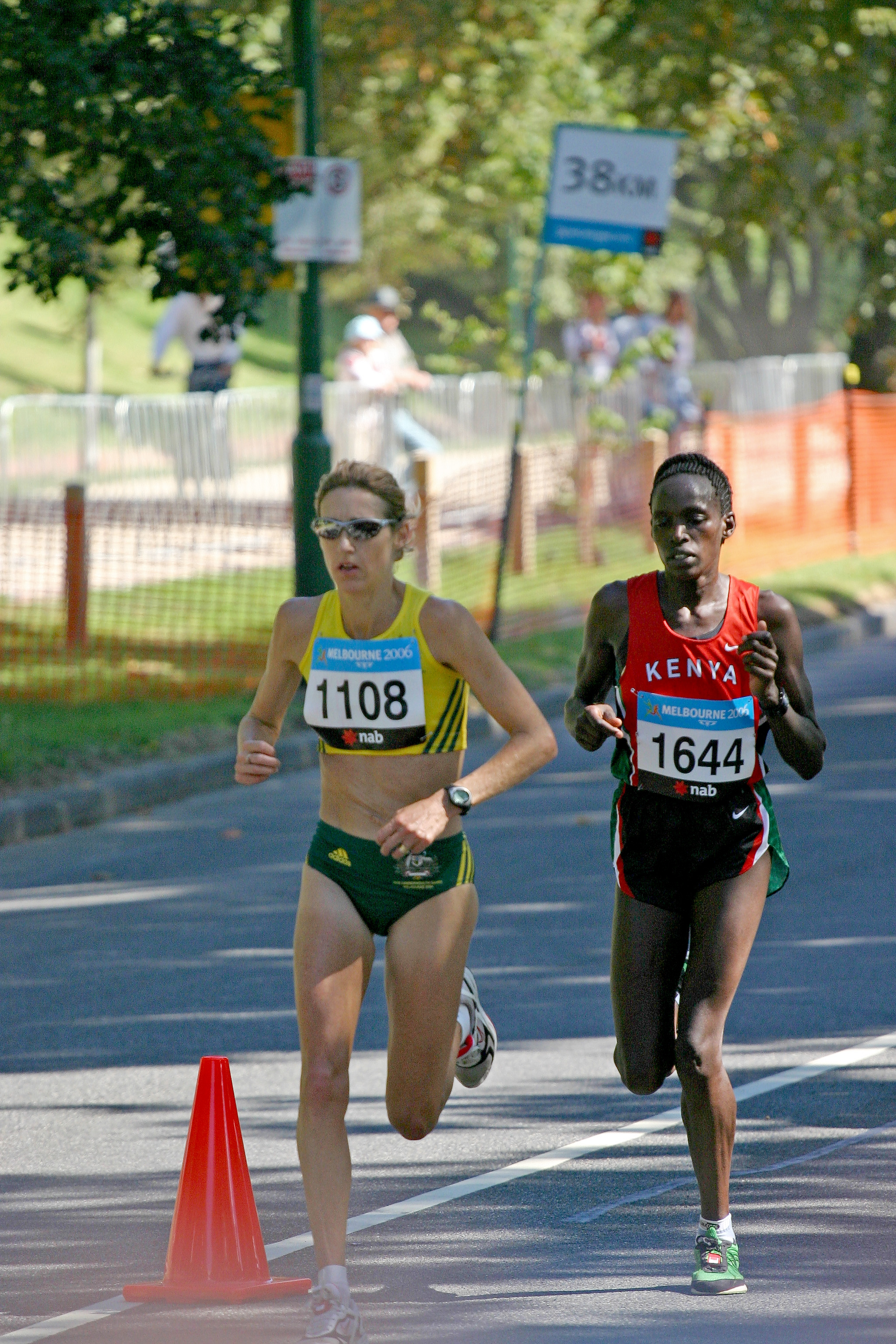
Australian Kerryn McCann and Kenyan Hellen Cherono Koskei battle for the gold medal in the marathon

The women's marathon event at the 2006 Commonwealth Games was held on March 19. The winning margin was two seconds which as of 2024 remains the only time the women's marathon was won by less than ten seconds at these games.

== Results ==
Rank	Name	Nationality	Time	Notes
1st place, gold medalist(s)	Kerryn McCann	Australia	2:30:54	SB
2nd place, silver medalist(s)	Hellen Cherono Koskei	Kenya	2:30:56	PB
3rd place, bronze medalist(s)	Liz Yelling	England	2:32:19	SB
4	Tracey Morris	Wales	2:33:13	PB
5	Josephine Akunaay	Tanzania	2:36:27	PB
6	Lioudmila Kortchaguina	Canada	2:36:43	
7	Kate Smyth	Australia	2:38:30	
8	Lauren Shelley	Australia	2:39:13	
9	Hayley Haining	Scotland	2:39:39	
10	Susan Partridge	Scotland	2:39:54	
11	Nicole Stevenson	Canada	2:40:58	
12	Tanith Maxwell	South Africa	2:41:47	
13	Mamoroallo Tjoka	Lesotho	2:43:35	
14	Rose Nyangacha	Kenya	2:46:49	
15	Charne Rademeyer	South Africa	2:50:05	
16	Shona Hicks	Scotland	2:51:41	
17	Danielle Florens	Mauritius	2:58:56	
18	Rebecca Moore	New Zealand	3:03:35	
19	Arieta Martin	Jamaica	3:34:36	
	Liza Hunter-Galvan	New Zealand	DNF	
	Sarah Majah Selli	Tanzania	DNF	
	Debra Mason	England	DNF	
	Beata Naigambo	Namibia	DNF	
