= Brass Monkey Half Marathon =

- Date: January
- Location: York
- Event type: Road
- Distance: Half marathon
- Established: 1982; 44 years ago
- Course records: male: 1:05:21 (2011) female: 1:11:46 (2008)
- Website: www.yorkknavesmireharriers.co.uk/brass-monkey/

The Brass Monkey Half Marathon is an annual road running event held outside York, United Kingdom. The event is organised by the York Knavesmire Harriers club and has been run since the early 1980s. In the early years the event was a contest for club runners but has expanded over its three decades attracting some of the country’s elite runners, these include Olympians Angela Tooby-Smith and Tracey Morris, and international ultra-runner Carolyn Hunter-Rowe. Despite the winter location of the race, it attracted a 1500 strong field in 2014 and 2016.

== Course ==
The race starts and finishes at York Racecourse, the course is on roads passing through Bishopthorpe, Acaster Selby, Appleton Roebuck and returning through Bishopthorpe.

== Past winners ==
Edition	Date	Time (h:m:s)	Men's winner	Time (h:m:s)	Women's winner
	19 Jan 2025	1:05:27	Lawrence McCourt	1:14:15	Heather Townsend
	21 Jan 2024	1:06:58	Tommy Power	1:12:33	Sarah Potter
	15 Jan 2023	1:06:21	Joe Sagar	1:15:18	Georgia Malir
	16 Jan 2022	1:05:28	Kieran Walker	1:18:10	Charlotte Mason
38th	12 Jan 2020	1:07:35	Richard Start	1:18:32	Lorna Young
37th	13 Jan 2019	1:09:44	Adrian Bailes	1:14:58	Becky Briggs
36th	14 Jan 2018	1:07:15	Jamie Parkinson	1:19:06	Tracy Millmore
35th	15 Jan 2017	1:09:18	Steve Hebblethwaite	1:17:19	Tracy Millmore
34th	17 Jan 2016	1:08:53	Daniel Kestrel	1:18:35	Sharon Barlow
33rd	18 Jan 2015	1:08:58	Daniel Jenkin	1:16:13	Shona McIntosh
32nd	19 Jan 2014	1:10:19	Matthew Pierson	1:15:58	Jilly Woodthorpe
	2013	Cancelled			
31st	22 Jan 2012	1:06:42	Yared Hagos	1:17:50	Felicity Milton
30th	23 Jan 2011	1:05:21	Paul Martelletti	1:21:16	Stacey Rogers
29th	24 Jan 2010	1:05:35	Matthew Pierson	1:18:37	Becky Penty
28th	18 Jan 2009	1:06:34	Matthew Pierson	1:16:20	Kim Fawke
27th	20 Jan 2008	1:08:13	Stephen Hepples	1:11:46	Hayley Haining
26th	21 Jan 2007	1:08:49	Gary Dunn	1:12:06	Hayley Haining
25th	22 Jan 2006	1:06:09	Ian Fisher	1:16:66	Tracey Morris
24th	23 Jan 2005	1:09:07	David Watson	1:13:31	Hayley Haining
23rd	25 Jan 2004	1:08:26	Ian Fisher	1:13:44	Tracey Morris
22nd	26 Jan 2003	1:07:56	Ian Fisher	1:21:27	Tracey Morris
21st	27 Jan 2002	1:06:46	Ian Fisher	1:17:35	Melanie Hayward
20th	28 Jan 2001	1.09.17	Ian Malone	1:22:57	Emma Latto
19th	31 Jan 1999	1:06:36	Ian Fisher	1:22:05	Angela Tooby
18th	1998		Richard Simpson		Sue Carris
17th	1997		Alan Beavers		Carolyn Hunter-Rowe
16th	1996		Chris Bartle		Carolyn Hunter-Rowe
15th	1995		Trevor Wilson		Sue Dolan
14th	1994		Dave Throup		Carolyn Hunter-Rowe
13th	1993		Trevor Wilson		Linda Lee
12th	1992		Dave Throup		Denise Johnson
11th	1991		Dave Throup		Kath Drake
10th	1990		Jack Brown		Debbie Banford
9th	1989		Richard Butterfield		June Cowper
8th	1988		Dave Throup		Kath Drake
7th	1987		Richard Butterfield		Chris Buckley
6th	1986		Terry Lonergan		Chris Buckley
5th	1985		Rob Burn		Debbie Banford

1985-1998 Results from "SQUARE WASPS"
