= Liz Yelling =

British long-distance runner

Liz Yelling née Talbot
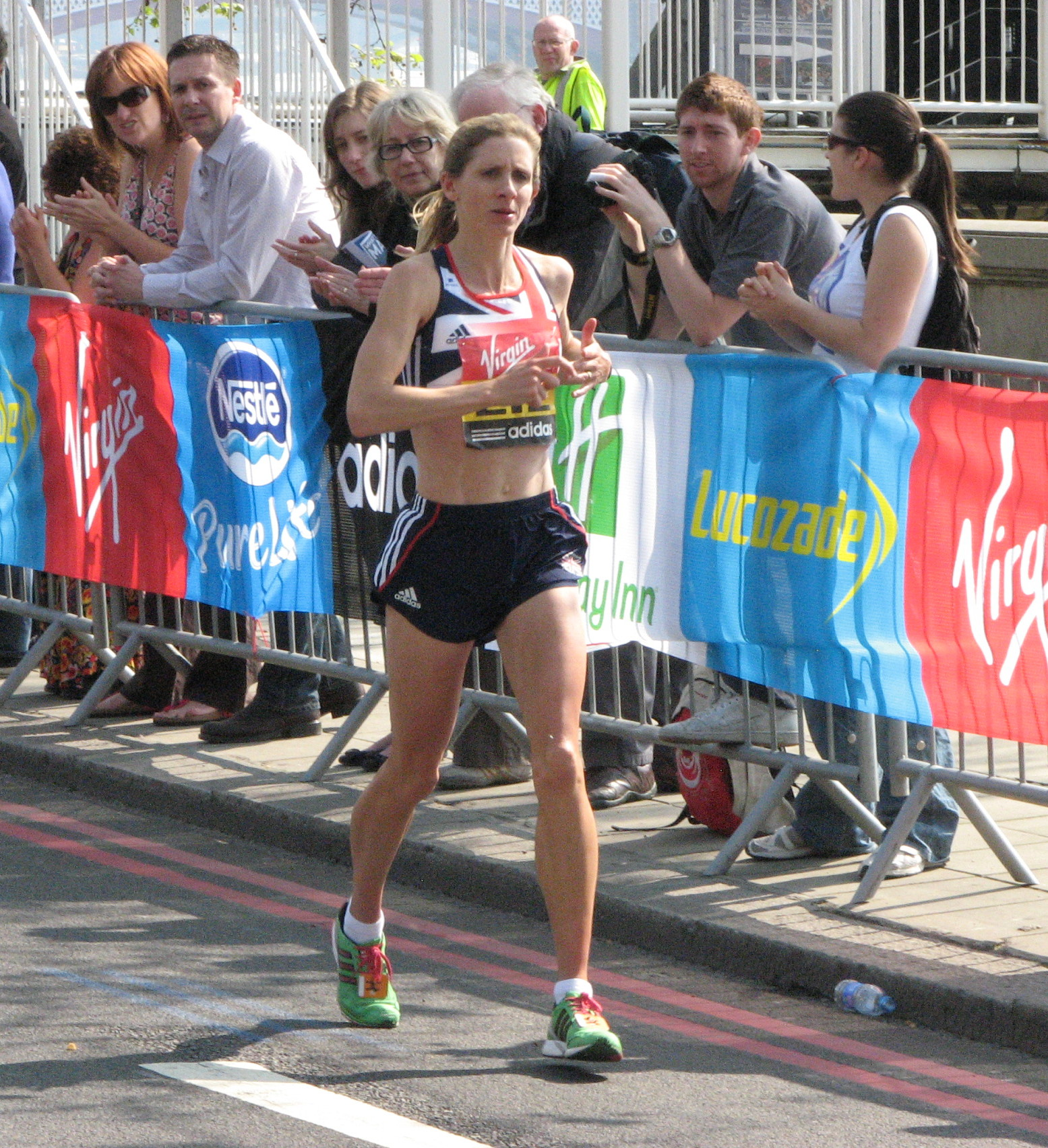
- Liz competing in the 2011 London Marathon

Personal information
- Nationality: British (English)
- Born: 5 December 1974 (age 51) Welwyn Garden City, England
- Height: 174 cm (5 ft 9 in)
- Weight: 55 kg (121 lb)
- Spouse: Martin Yelling

Sport
- Sport: Athletics
- Event: Marathon
- Club: Bedford & County AC

Elizabeth Anne Yelling (née Talbot born 5 December 1974) is an English long-distance runner who competed at two Olympic Games. She is a Commonwealth Games bronze medallist, having finished third in the women's marathon in 2006.

== Biography ==
Talbot, born in Welwyn Garden City, Hertfordshire, finished second behind Helen Pattinson in the 1500 metres event at the 2001 AAA Championships. She is the former training partner of Paula Radcliffe.

Yelling took part in the women's 10,000 metres event at the 2002 Commonwealth Games, finishing fourth. At the 2004 Olympic Games in Athens, Yelling represented Great Britain in the women's marathon, finishing 25th.

Yelling represented England at the 2006 Commonwealth Games in Melbourne, winning the bronze medal in the marathon with a time of 2:32:18, behind Kerryn McCann and Hellen Cherono Koskei. Shortly afterwards she finished third behind Jo Pavey and Hayley Yelling in the 5000 metres event at the 2006 AAA Championships.

Yelling set the women's course record for the Bath Half Marathon with a time of 69 minutes 28 seconds set in 2007; The following year she was the first woman to cross the line in the Reading Half Marathon, in 69 minutes 35 seconds, set in 2008.

Yelling finished as the highest placed British athlete at the 2008 London Marathon, which handed her the title of national marathon champion. Later that year, at the 2008 Olympic Games in Beijing, Yelling represented the Great Britain team again in the marathon, finishing 26th.

== Family life ==
Through her marriage to steeplechase athlete Martin Yelling, Liz Yelling is the sister-in-law of fellow British runner Hayley Yelling. After retiring, Yelling co-founded and ran a running coaching company, alongside her husband.

== Achievements ==
- All results regarding marathon, unless stated otherwise

Year	Competition	Venue	Position	Notes
Representing United Kingdom
2004	Olympic Games	Athens, Greece	25th	2:40:13
2006	Commonwealth Games	Melbourne, Australia	3rd	2:32:19
2008	Olympic Games	Beijing, China	26th	2:33:12
2008	Reading Half Marathon	Reading, United Kingdom	1st	1:09:35

== Personal bests ==
Distance	Mark	Date	Location
800 m	2:09.72	6 September 2000	Watford
1,500 m	4:15:01	14 July 2001	Birmingham
3,000 m	8:57.3	25 July 2001	Watford
5,000 m	15:38.86	30 July 2004	Crystal Palace
10,000 m track	31:58.39	30 July 2002	Manchester
10,000 m road	32:55	20 May 2007	Manchester
Half marathon	1:09.28	25 March 2007	Bath
Marathon	2:28.33	13 April 2008	London
