= Hayley Haining =

British runner (born 1972)

Personal information
- Nationality: British (Scottish)
- Born: 6 March 1972 (age 54) Dumfries, Scotland

Sport
- Sport: Athletics
- Event: middle/long distance
- Club: City of Glasgow AC

Hayley Haining (born 6 March 1972) is a British runner who was nominated as a reserve for the British team for the 2008 Olympic Games.

== Running career ==
Haining won the British schools cross-country championship in 1985 when she was thirteen years old, and was seventh in the world cross country championships in Antwerp in 1991. After suffering some injuries, she gave up competitive running for four years after 1999. She did however become the British 5,000 metres champion after winning the British AAA Championships title at the 1999 AAA Championships.

Haining competed in the marathon at the 2006 Commonwealth Games in Melbourne, where she finished ninth, and was the top ranked Scottish athlete in the race, despite suffering from flu beforehand. She failed to win the third team place in the marathon for the 2008 Olympic Games when she finished behind Liz Yelling at the 2008 Flora London Marathon. As of 29 July 2008, she was on standby to run in the marathon if Paula Radcliffe was unable to do so. However, Radcliffe was fit enough to run, and completed the marathon in 23rd place.

In 2008, Haining finished the New York City Marathon as the second British finisher in 12th place. The first British finisher was Paula Radcliffe who won the race, and the third British finisher was Lucy MacAlister, who finished in 13th place.

Haining was selected to compete in the marathon for Scotland at the 2014 Commonwealth Games in Glasgow after setting a time of 2:36 at the 2013 London Marathon. At the age of 42 she was the oldest athlete to ever compete for Scotland in track and field. She completed the Commonwealth Games marathon in 13th place.

== Personal life ==
Haining works as a veterinary pathologist at the Glasgow Veterinary School where she has taught, among others, Scottish middle-distance runner and team-mate at the 2014 Commonwealth Games Laura Muir.

== Achievements ==
- All results regarding marathon, unless stated otherwise

Year	Competition	Venue	Position	Notes
Representing Great Britain
2005	World Championships	Helsinki, Finland	25th	2:34:41
Representing Scotland
2006	Commonwealth Games	Melbourne, Australia	9th	2:39:39
2014	Commonwealth Games	Glasgow, United Kingdom	13th	2:40:40
