= Jepchumba Bundotich =

Kenyan athletics coach

Ruth Jepchumba Bundotich is an athletics coach from Kenya. On November 29, 2025, she was named as the 2025 World Athletics Woman of the Year. She mentored long distance runner from Kenya and world record-holder Agnes Ng’etich. Working with Ikaika Sports Agency and Adidas Running, she helped many young athletes, especially girls.
