= Lyudmila Korchagina =

Canadian marathon runner

Lioudmila Kortchaguina
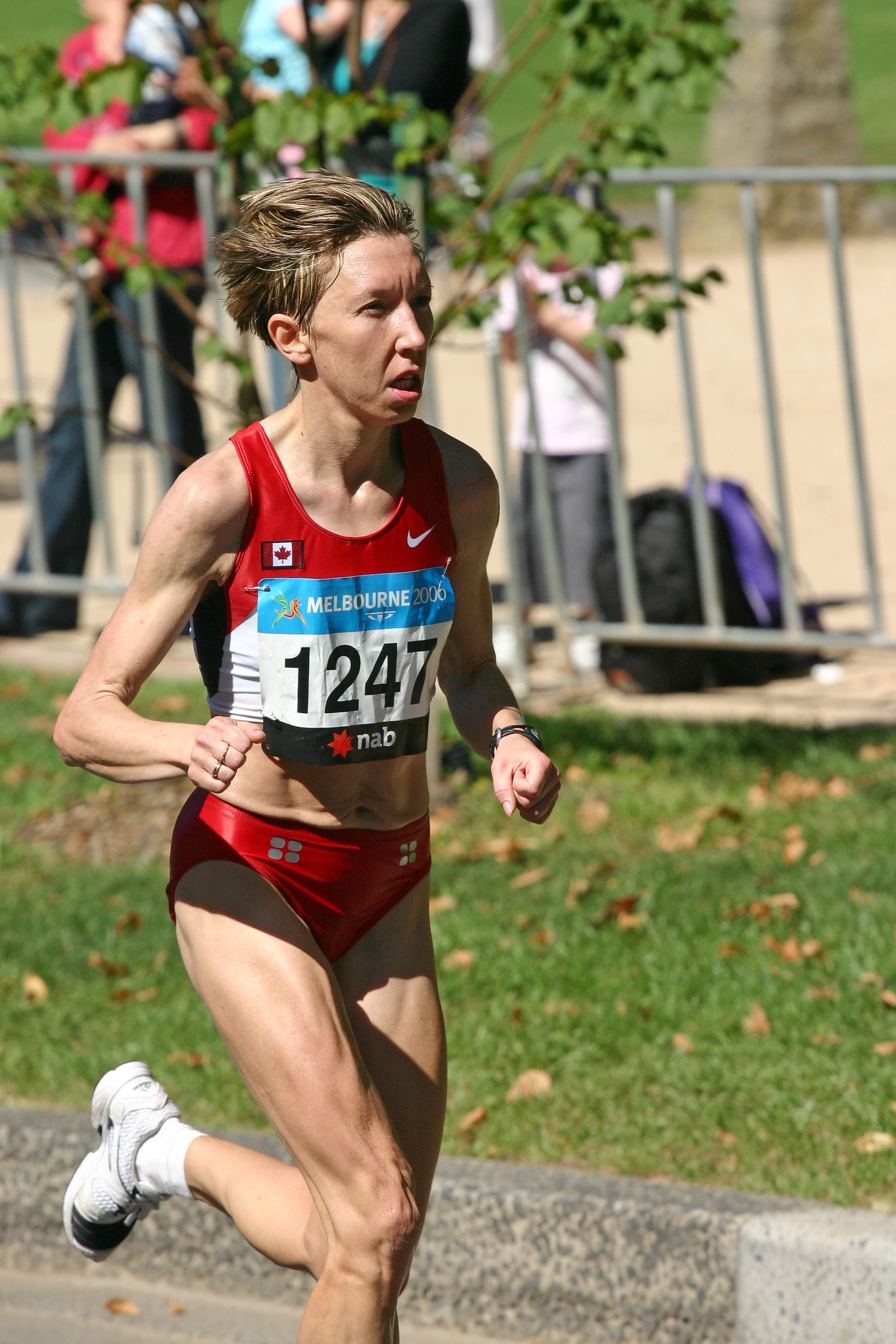
- Kortchaguina during 2006 Commonwealth Games in Melbourne

Personal information
- Nationality: Canadian
- Born: 26 July 1971 (age 54) Yekaterinburg, Soviet Union
- Home town: Toronto, Ontario, Canada

Sport
- Country: Canada
- Sport: Track and field
- Event: Marathon

Lioudmila Kortchaguina (Russian: Людмила Корчагина, romanized: Lyudmila Korchagina, born 26 July 1971) is a Canadian marathon runner of Russian descent. Kortchaguina was born in Yekaterinburg, Soviet Russia, and became a Canadian citizen in June 2005. She has represented Canada internationally in events such as the 2005 IAAF World Half Marathon Championships and the 2006 Commonwealth Games.

== IAAF World Ranking ==
Kortchaguina's current world ranking in Women's Marathon is 914th, with her overall world ranking at 9,692nd. As for her highest ever world ranking positions, she was ranked 837th in Women's Marathon, 656th in Women's Road Running, and 8,979th in Women's Overall Ranking.

== IAAF Race Records ==
Kortchaguina's first recorded IAAF Race result occurred on August 7, 1982, in Leningrad USSR, where she competed in the 5,000m race and placed first with a time of 16:27 (16 minutes & 27 seconds). The next day, Kortchaguina achieved another 1st-place finish, this time in the 10,000m race, finishing with a time of 34:04.5.

On October 13, 1996, Kortchaguina finished 1st in the Lyon Marathon in France, with a time of 2:35:35 (2 hours, 35 minutes, & 35 seconds). Less than a month later, on November 10, 1996, she finished 4th in the Puteaux Marathon in France, with a time of 2:34:39. The winner of the 1996 Puteaux Marathon, Romanian runner Lidia Panciu, finished with a time of 2:33:22, only 1 minute & 17 seconds faster than Kortchaguina.

On October 15, 2000, Kortchaguina competed in the Istanbul Marathon, achieving a 7th-place finish with a time of 2:46:00.

In the 2006 Commonwealth Games held in Melbourne, Kortchaguina represented Canada in the marathon and finished in 6th place with a time of 2:36:43.
