= Falilatou Tchanile-Salifou =

Togolese sports administrator

- Occupation: sports executive
- Known for: 2023 Woman of the Year

Falilatou Tchanile-Salifou is Togo's leading sports administrator. She has used sport as a way of increasing gender representation in sports organisation and education generally. She was named Woman of the Year at the World Athletics Awards 2023.

== Life ==
Tchanile-Salifou became the President of the Togolese athletics federation and she has used sport as a way of increasing the role of women in her country.

Tchanile-Salifou organised a race that gathered 1,500 female competitors as part of a campaign titled "Girls together for sport and for life". Togo has remote regions and these were also targeted as well as Togo's larger towns.

Tchanile-Salifou had an awareness programme that encouraged parents to register the births of girls and then to go on and ensure that they went to school. Measurable improvements were made. It was reported that 90% of the girls returned to school in Togo at the start of the 2023 school year. This compared with an estimate of 40% for the year before. (Data from UNESCO is not available in this detail).

In 2023 the World Athletic Foundation added a new section to its awards. President Sebastion Coe was credited with initiating the award and the inaugural award went to Tchanile-Salifou. She was recognised for "advancing women's rights and fostering gender equality in sport". Faith Kipyegon and Kelvin Kiptum from Kenya and Ethiopia's Tigist Assefa were all runners named as Best athletes of the year, joining her achievements for Africa.

The award should raise her profile at the Paris Olympics. She is leading her country's contribution and she is the vice President of the association of francophone athletic federations.
