= Sumo-suit athletics =

Sport done using sumo fat suits

Sumo Suit Athletics is an international sport which started in the United Kingdom in the year 2008. It is a sport where participants wear sumo fat suits while doing regular athletic events. The suits used weigh around 11 kg. The suits restrict leg movement, and participants are not allowed to use their hands to lift the suits up. This results in participants raising their arms and shoulders while running producing a comedic effect.

== World championships ==
There have now been three World Championship events held since 2008 with the next event set to take place some time in 2012.

The five main events at the World Championships include: 100m sprint, Long jump, High jump, Shot put and the 400m endurance race.

The 2009 men's event, held at the Battersea athletics track in London, was dominated by three South Africans, Willem Muller, Jeremy Gallop and brother Michael Gallop, who won in all 5 events. Four world records were broken with only the 100m record standing from the previous year. In the women's event Charlotte Willis from Great Britton won 3 events, and four new world records were set in part due to the introduction of 'child's' suits for the women instead of adult suits. The women's high jump record from 2008 was not beaten.

The 2010 event was again held at the Battersea athletics track in London. In the men's event all but the shot put world record was broken. Ed Moyse set a new 100m record with 14.43secs and also a Long Jump record of 4.25m. Jeremy Gallop bettered his own record from 2009 in the High Jump by jumping 1.31m. Sam Hyatt-Twynam ran a blistering pace in the 400m to set a new world record of 1.26secs. In the women's event Jo Higgins dominated by setting four new world records in the 100m, Long Jump, Shot Put and 400m. Gabrielle Morales from Hungary set a new women's high jump record with a height of 1.05m.

== Records ==
The current world records (as of June 2010) are:

=== Men's world records ===
EVENT	MARK	ATHLETE	YEAR	PLACE
100m Sprint	14.43sec	Ed Moyse (GBR)	2010	Battersea Park, London
High Jump	1.31m	Jeremy Gallop (RSA)	2010	Battersea Park, London
Long Jump	4.25m	Ed Moyse (GBR)	2010	Battersea Park, London
Shot Put	8.71m	Jeremy Gallop (RSA)	2009	Battersea Park, London
400m "Endurance"	1min26sec	Sam Hyatt-Twynam (GBR)	2010	Battersea Park, London

=== Women's world records ===
EVENT	MARK	ATHLETE	YEAR	PLACE
100m Sprint	18.50sec	Jo Siggins (GBR)	2010	Battersea Park, London
High Jump	1.05m	Gabriella Morales (HUN)	2010	Battersea Park, London
Long Jump	2.87m	Jo Siggins (GBR)	2010	Battersea Park, London
Shot Put	5.10m	Jo Siggins (GBR)	2010	Battersea Park, London
400m "Endurance"	1min30s	Jo Siggins (GBR)	2010	Battersea Park, London

== Men's seasons best ==
- (Updated August 2010)

=== 100m sprint ===
YEAR	MARK	ATHLETE	PLACE
2008	17.5sec	Nick Broughton (GBR)	Tooting Bec, London
2009	18.87sec	Michael Gallop (RSA)	Battersea Park, London
2010	14.43sec	Ed Moyse (GBR)	Battersea Park, London

=== High jump ===
YEAR	MARK	ATHLETE	PLACE
2008	1.03m	Nick Broughton (GBR)	Tooting Bec, London
2009	1.29m	Jeremy Gallop (RSA)	Battersea Park, London
2010	1.31m	Jeremy Gallop (RSA)	Battersea Park, London

=== Long jump ===
YEAR	MARK	ATHLETE	PLACE
2008	3.32m	Nick Broughton (GBR)	Tooting Bec, London
2009	4.00m	Jeremy Gallop (RSA)	Battersea Park, London
2010	4.25m	Ed Moyse (GBR)	Battersea Park, London

=== Shot put ===
- (Updated August 2010)

YEAR	MARK	ATHLETE	PLACE
2008	8.34m	Ross Williams (GBR)	Tooting Bec, London
2009	8.71m	Jeremy Gallop (RSA)	Battersea Park, London
2010	8.14m	Michael Gallop (RSA)	Battersea Park, London

=== 400m "endurance" ===
YEAR	MARK	ATHLETE	PLACE
2008	1min32sec	Nick Broughton (GBR)	Tooting Bec, London
2009	1min31.8sec	Willem Muller (RSA)	Battersea Park, London
2010	1min26sec	Sam Hyatt-Twynam (GBR)	Battersea Park, London

== Women's seasons best ==
- (Updated August 2010)

=== 100m sprint ===
YEAR	MARK	ATHLETE	PLACE
2008	29.68sec		Tooting Bec, London
2009	27.61sec	Charlotte Willis (GBR)	Battersea Park, London
2010	18.50sec	Jo Siggins (GBR)	Battersea Park, London

=== High jump ===
YEAR	MARK	ATHLETE	PLACE
2008	0.88m	Renee Barnes (AUS)	Tooting Bec, London
2009	0.85m	Charlotte Willis (GBR)	Battersea Park, London
2010	1.05m	Gabriella Morales (HUN)	Battersea Park, London

=== Long jump ===
YEAR	MARK	ATHLETE	PLACE
2008	1.18m		Tooting Bec, London
2009	2.56m	Charlotte Willis (GBR)	Battersea Park, London
2010	2.87m	Jo Siggins (GBR)	Battersea Park, London

=== Shot put ===
- (Updated August 2010)

YEAR	MARK	ATHLETE	PLACE
2008	4.16m		Tooting Bec, London
2009	4.73m	Rachael Addicot (AUS)	Battersea Park, London
2010	5.10m	Jo Siggins (GBR)	Battersea Park, London

=== 400m "endurance" ===
YEAR	MARK	ATHLETE	PLACE
2008	3min07sec		Tooting Bec, London
2009	1min43sec	Susie Goodman (GBR)	Battersea Park, London
2010	1min30sec	Jo Siggins (GBR)	Battersea Park, London

Record Sources:
