= Hellen Cherono Koskei =

Kenyan long-distance runner

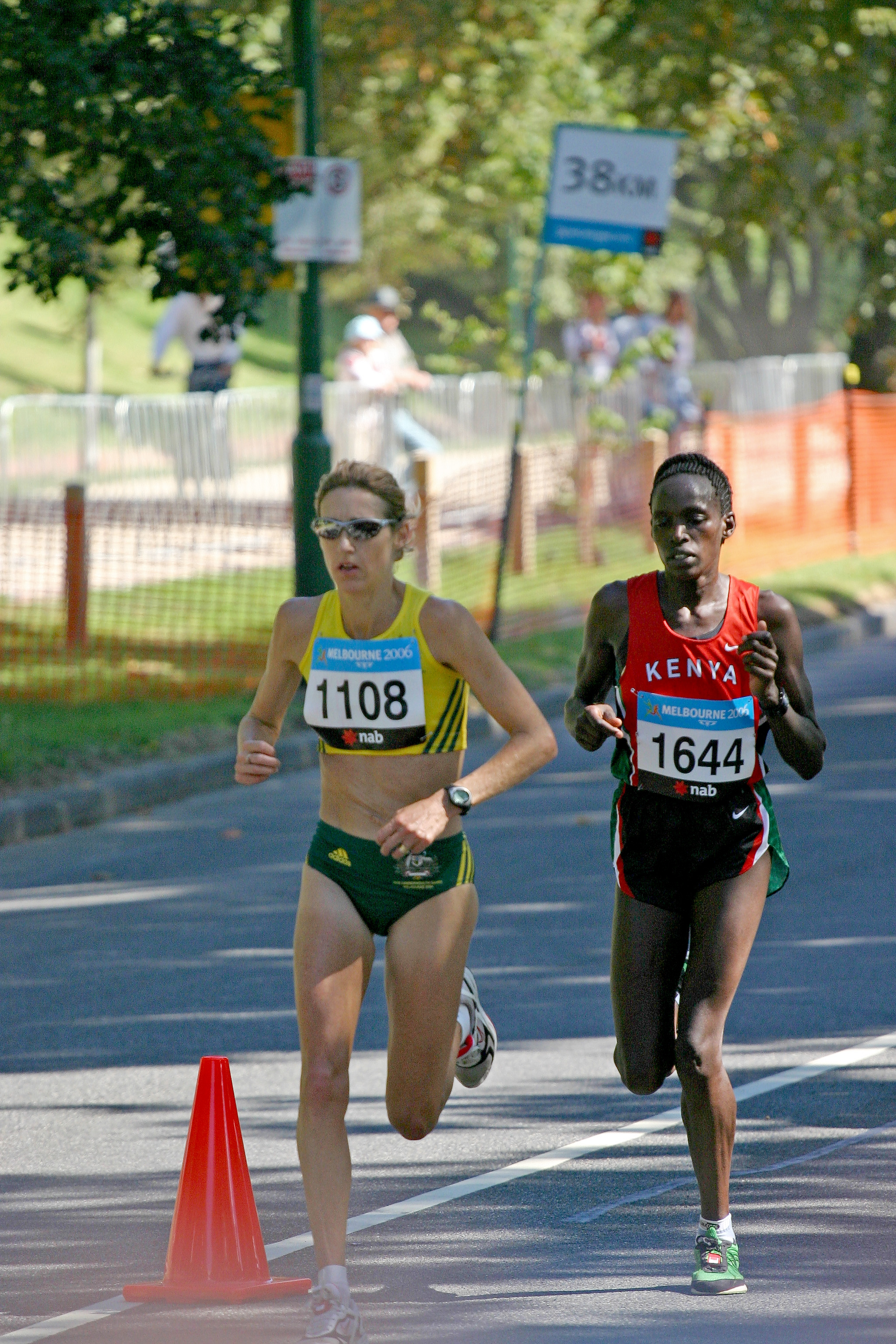
- Koskei battles with Kerryn McCann for the gold medal in the 2006 Commonwealth Games marathon

Personal information
- Nationality: Kenyan
- Born: 22 February 1984 Kenya

Sport
- Sport: Running
Medal record
Women's athletics
Representing Kenya
Commonwealth Games
| Silver medal – second place | 2006 Melbourne | Marathon |

Hellen Cherono Koskei (born 22 February 1984) is a former Kenyan long-distance runner. She won a silver medal in the marathon event at the 2006 Commonwealth Games in Melbourne.
