= Kerryn McCann =

Australian long-distance runner

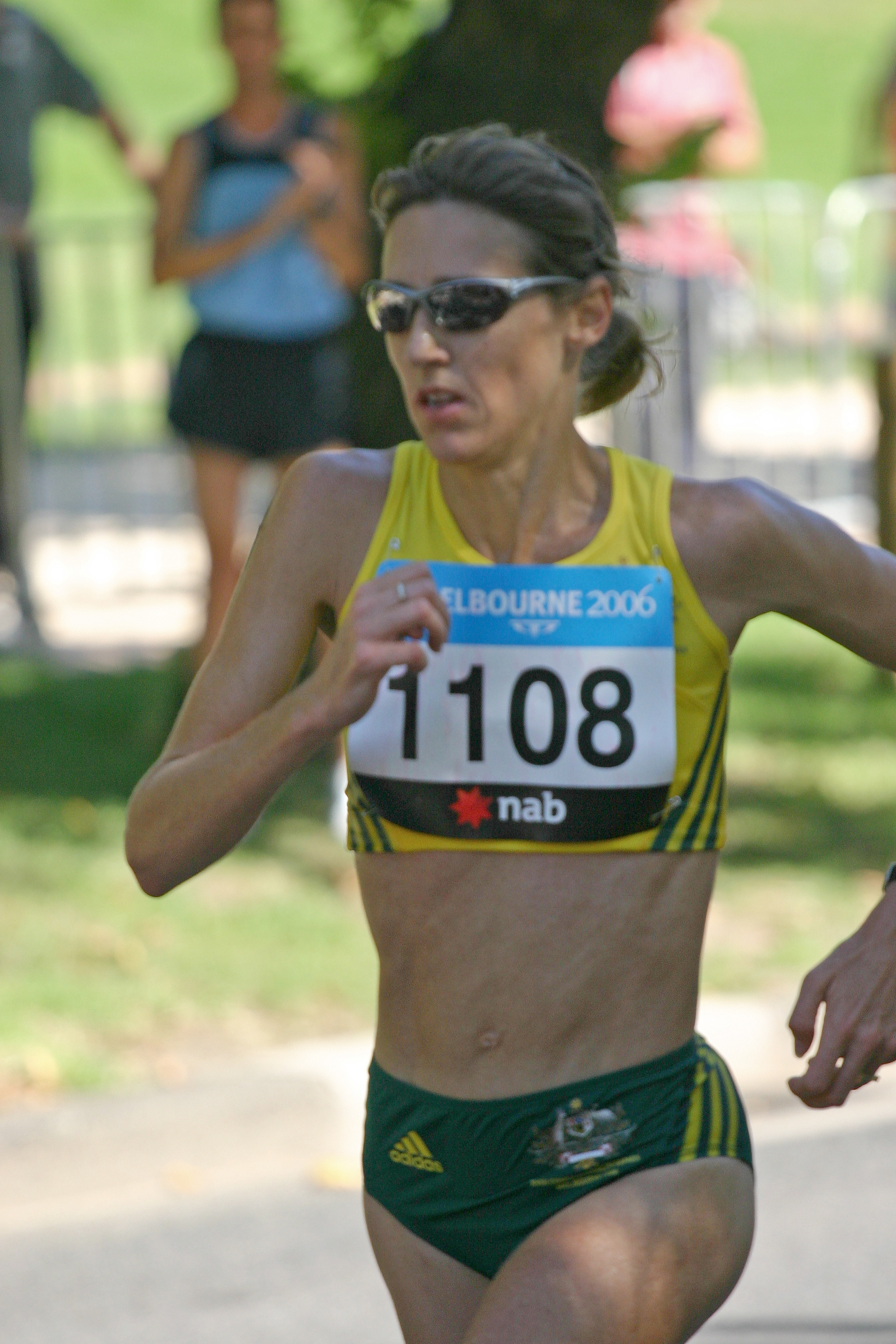
- McCann at the 2006 Commonwealth Games

Personal information
- Nationality: Australian
- Born: Kerryn Hindmarsh; 2 May 1967 Bulli, New South Wales
- Died: 7 December 2008 (aged 41) Coledale, New South Wales

Sport
- Sport: Running
Medal record
Women's athletics
Representing Australia
Commonwealth Games
Gold medal – first place	2002 Manchester	Marathon
Gold medal – first place	2006 Melbourne	Marathon
Chicago Marathon
Bronze medal – third place	2001 Chicago	Marathon

Kerryn McCann (née Hindmarsh; 2 May 1967 – 7 December 2008) was an Australian athlete. She was best known for winning the marathon at the 2002 and 2006 Commonwealth Games.

== Personal life ==
McCann was born Kerryn Hindmarsh in Bulli, New South Wales, in 1967.

In 1991, she married Greg McCann, a surfer who represented Australia twice in international competition, and was Australian champion in 1983. Their first son Benton, was born in 1997; daughter Josie was born in 2003.

In August 2007, it was announced that McCann, who was expecting her third child at the time, was being treated for breast cancer. She had surgery to remove the lump and was later induced, giving birth to son Cooper on 5 September 2007 (6 weeks premature). She then began a 20-week course of chemotherapy and radiation therapy. Cooper spent several weeks in a neonatal ward, undergoing steroid treatment, to aid the growth of his lungs. "It was really hard seeing him with the tubes and drip and monitor - this tiny baby," McCann said, two months after his birth.

However, by May 2008 the cancer had spread to her liver. McCann died at her home on 7 December 2008, surrounded by her family.

== Athletics career ==
McCann had an early interest in athletics, winning the New South Wales primary school cross country championship in 1979. However, McCann gave up competitive athletics until taking it up again near the end of high school, running her first marathon at the age of seventeen. At age 19 she ran the marathon at the Australian Championships, placing 3rd.

McCann won her first Australian championship events in 1988, placing first in the one mile race, and first in the marathon, having previously come third in the marathon in 1986. McCann has subsequently won Australian championships in cross country (1992 and 1999), 10,000 metres (in 2002) and again in the marathon in 1993. At the 1994 Commonwealth Games in Victoria, British Columbia, Canada, McCann placed tenth in the marathon, and at the 1996 Summer Olympics in Atlanta, United States, she finished 28th.

McCann took a break from professional competition for the birth of her first son, returning in 1999. At the 2000 Summer Olympics in Sydney, Australia, McCann finished eleventh in the marathon. On running into the packed Sydney Stadium the crowd erupted. Earlier in the year she placed fifth in the London Marathon, in a time of 2:25.59, her personal best and an Australian record. She achieved a seventh place in the New York Marathon in 2002. McCann's best result in international competition came later in 2002 at the 2002 Commonwealth Games in Manchester, United Kingdom, where she won gold ahead of fellow Australians, Krishna Stanton and Jackie Gallagher. McCann again took a break from competition for the birth of her daughter, before commencing training in late 2003 and returning to competition in 2004, competing in the 2004 Summer Olympics in Athens, Greece, finishing 31st in the marathon.

In 2005, she won the 14 kilometre, City to Surf in a time of 46 minutes 27 seconds.

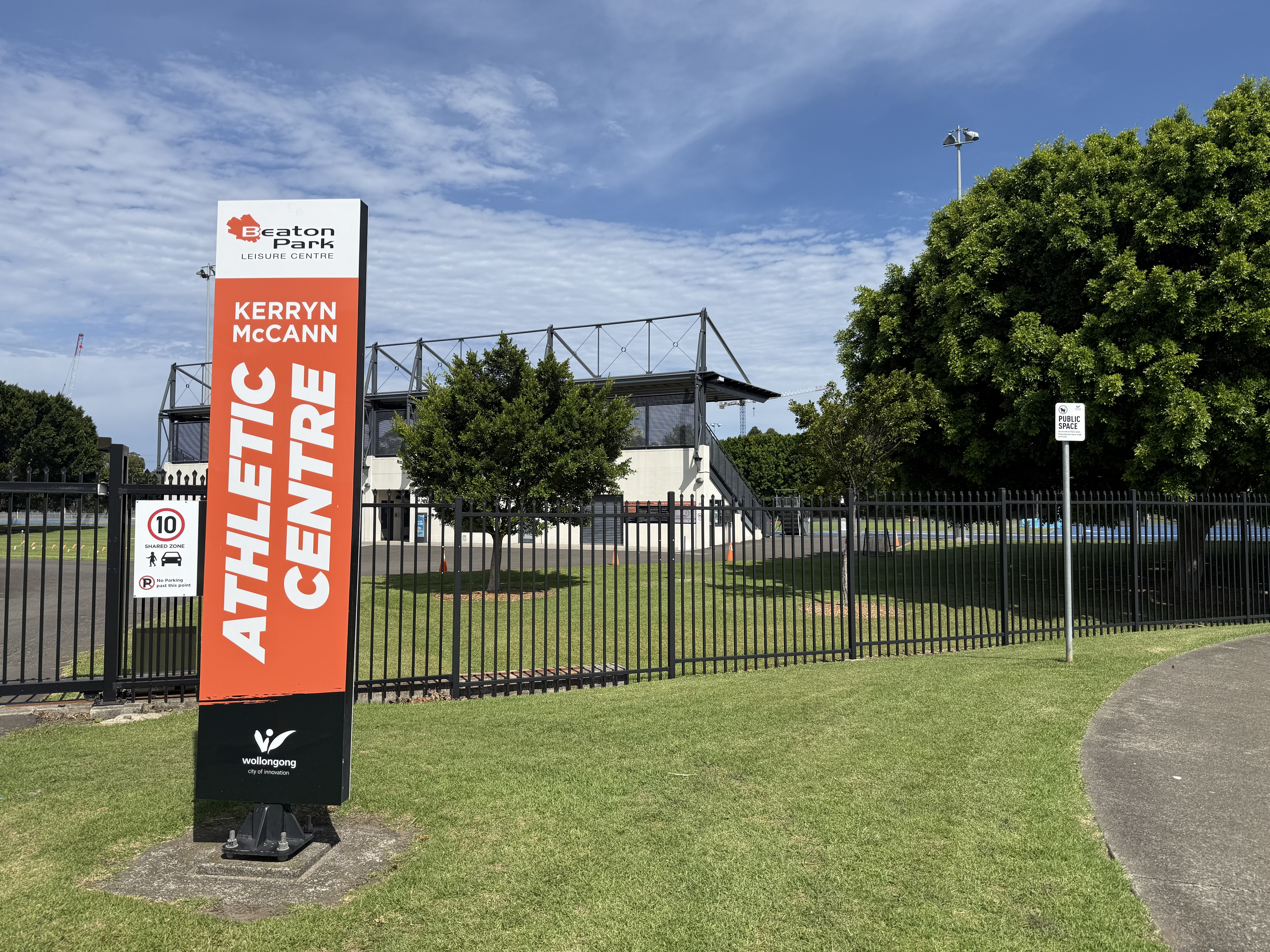
Kerryn McCann Athletic Centre in Wollongong, December 2025

At the 2006 Commonwealth Games in Melbourne, Australia, at the age of thirty-eight, McCann defended her Commonwealth title, winning gold in the marathon in a time of 2:30:54, just two seconds ahead of Kenyan, Hellen Cherono Koskei. The lead changed six times in the final two kilometres of the race, before McCann pulled clear in the final two hundred metres around the athletics track inside the Melbourne Cricket Ground. McCann described the race as "probably the greatest victory I've ever had, or the greatest race I've ever run." In October 2015, Sport Australia Hall of Fame awarded her performance as one of its Great Sporting Moments.

== Achievements ==
- All results regarding marathon, unless stated otherwise

Year	Competition	Venue	Position	Notes
Representing Australia
1995	World Championships	Gothenburg, Sweden	15th	2:36:29
1996	Olympic Games	Atlanta, United States	28th	2:36:41
2000	Olympic Games	Sydney, Australia	11th	2:28:37
2001	Chicago Marathon	Chicago, United States	3rd	2:26:04
2002	Commonwealth Games	Manchester, United Kingdom	1st	2:30:05
2004	Olympic Games	Athens, Greece	31st	2:41:41
2006	Commonwealth Games	Melbourne, Australia	1st	2:30:54

== Personal bests ==
- 5000 metres: 15:08.69 (2000 - Australian record)
- 10000 metres 31.55.94 (1999)
- Half marathon: 1:07.48 (2000 - Australian record)
- Marathon: 2:25.59 (2000)
