= Woldemeskel Kostre =

Dr. Woldemeskel Kostre
- Born: January 29, 1947; Shewa, Ethiopia
- Died: May 16, 2016 (aged 69); Addis Ababa, Ethiopia
- Occupation: Athletics Coach

Dr. Woldemeskel Kostre (Amharic: ዶ/ር ወ/መስቀል ኮስትሬ, January 29, 1947 – May 16, 2016) was an Ethiopian long distance running coach. He was known for coaching such Olympic champions as Haile Gebreselassie, Kenenisa Bekele, Gebre-Egziabher Gebremariam, Tirunesh Dibaba and Derartu Tulu. While coaching he earned a reputation of being a disciplinarian and authoritarian with athletes working under him constantly being pushed to their limits resulting in many world records being set under his watch. He was the recipient of the 2006 IAAF Coaches' Award.

== Coaching career ==
Born on January 29, 1947, in central Shewa province of Ethiopia, Kostre was a promising middle-distance runner himself. When given the choice of either representing his country at the 1964 Olympic games or studying sports science in Hungary on scholarship, he chose the latter. during the 1960s. Kostre was first appointed as an assistant coach of the Ethiopian athletics team at the 1972 Olympic Games. He coached for over 30 years becoming an established member of the Ethiopian Olympics delegation. Kostre was considered by many to be the architect of Ethiopia's success at longer distance running starting from the 1980s onward.

He became the head national coach of the Ethiopian Athletics team starting from the 1992 Summer Olympics in Barcelona, where Derartu Tulu became the first black African women to win Olympic gold winning the 10,000m final. He was coached the team up until the 2008 Olympic Games in Beijing. Ethiopian athletes won a total of 28 Olympic medals during his time as a coach.

== Death ==
Kostre died at the age of 69 on May 16, 2016, in Addis Ababa, Ethiopia. He was interred at Kidist Selassie Cathedral cemetery.
