= Tracey Morris =

British long-distance runner

Tracey Morris (born 9 September 1967) is a British long-distance runner.

== Early career ==
Morris grew up in Anglesey, Wales and ran as a Welsh schoolgirl, but stopped running soon after. She moved to Leeds and in 1998, aged 30, she resumed running to keep fit, and took part in the London Marathon running for charity.

In December 2003 she took part in a local event the 'Leeds Abbey Dash' and finished as the first woman just ahead of Bev Jenkins . The race was watched by UK Athletics' Bud Baldero who invited her to join the Great Britain Marathon squad. Baldero also ensured she had a place in the 2004 London Marathon for which her application had not been successful. She was the only non-professional runner to be invited to take part. In January 2004 she won two domestic half marathon races, the Brass Monkey Half Marathon and Four Villages Half Marathon.

On 18 April 2004, she stood on the Blackheath, London starting line of the London Marathon, not knowing what was to come. But as a relatively unknown runner she burst into the public conscience by becoming the first British woman to finish. She was so unknown that one of the then-fastest British runners, Birhan Dagne, did not try to finish in front of her as "I did not know who she was".

After retiring, Morris continued working as an optician in Leeds.

== International Competition ==
Year	Competition	Venue	Position	Event	Notes
Representing Great Britain and Wales
2004	Olympic Games	Athens, Greece	29th	Marathon	2:41:00
2006	Commonwealth Games	Melbourne, Australia	4th	Marathon	2:33:13
2006	European Championships	Gothenburg, Sweden	16th	Marathon	2:37:34
2007	World Championships	Osaka, Japan	19th	Marathon	2:36:40

== Road races ==
Year	Competition	Venue	Position	Event	Notes
2003	Wilmslow Half Marathon	Wilmslow	9th	Half Marathon	1:18:42
2004	Four Villages Half Marathon	Helsby	1st	Half Marathon	1:14:22
2004	Brass Monkey Half Marathon	York	1st	Half Marathon	1:13:44
2004	London Marathon	London	10th	Marathon	2:33:52
2005	Brass Monkey Half Marathon	York	2nd	Half Marathon	1:14:47
2005	Liverpool Half Marathon	Liverpool	2nd	Half Marathon	1:13:18
2006	Brass Monkey Half Marathon	York	1st	Half Marathon	1:16:55
2006	Great North Run	Newcastle upon tyne	12th	Half Marathon	1:13:10
2007	Silverstone Half Marathon	Silverstone	3rd	Half Marathon	1:17:26
2007	Great North Run	Newcastle upon tyne	7th	Half Marathon	1:13:22
2008	Reading Half Marathon	Reading, Berkshire	7th	Half Marathon	1:15:45
